= 2024 Diamond League =

International athletics championship series

- Edition: 15th
- Dates: 20 April – 14 September 2024
- Events: 32
- Meetings: 15

The 2024 Diamond League was the fifteenth season of the annual series of outdoor track and field meetings, organised by World Athletics. The competition was a revision to the top level athletics series since Diamond League foundation in 2010. The number of Diamond Discipline events was 32. Each meeting will host a number of Diamond Discipline events and some of these events will not be broadcast. Events losing Diamond Discipline status will feature on the World Athletics Continental Tour, the second tier of track and field meetings.

The series concluded with the Diamond League Finals in Brussels, Belgium on 13th and 14th September 2024.

== Schedule ==
The following fifteen meetings are scheduled to be included in the 2024 season.

Leg	Date	Meet	Stadium	City	Country	Events (M+W)
1	20 April	Xiamen Diamond League	Xiamen Egret Stadium	Xiamen	China	7 + 7 = 14
2	27 April	Yangtze Delta Athletics Diamond Gala (temporary location of Diamond League Shanghai)	Suzhou Olympic Sports Centre	Suzhou	China	7 + 7 = 14
3	10 May	Doha Diamond League	Suheim bin Hamad Stadium	Doha	Qatar	7 + 7 = 14
4	19 May	Meeting International Mohammed VI d'Athlétisme de Rabat	Grand Stade de Marrakech	Marrakesh	Morocco	7 + 7 = 14
5	25 May	Prefontaine Classic	Hayward Field	Eugene	United States	6 + 8 = 14
6	30 May	Bislett Games	Bislett Stadium	Oslo	Norway	8 + 6 = 14
7	2 June	Bauhausgalan	Stockholm Olympic Stadium	Stockholm	Sweden	7 + 7 = 14
8	7 July	Meeting de Paris	Stade Sébastien Charléty	Paris	France	7 + 7 = 14
9	12 July	Herculis	Stade Louis II	Fontvieille	Monaco	7 + 7 = 14
10	20 July	London Athletics Meet	London Stadium	London	Great Britain	7 + 7 = 14
11	22 August	Athletissima	Stade Olympique de la Pontaise	Lausanne	Switzerland	7 + 7 = 14
12	25 August	Kamila Skolimowska Memorial	Stadion Śląski	Chorzów	Poland	7 + 7 = 14
13	30 August	Golden Gala Pietro Mennea	Stadio Olimpico	Rome	Italy	7 + 7 = 14
14	5 September	Weltklasse Zürich	Letzigrund	Zürich	Switzerland	7 + 7 = 14
15	13-14 September	AG Memorial Van Damme	King Baudouin Stadium	Brussels	Belgium	16 + 16 = 32

== Men's results ==
Denotes the event was not included as part of qualification for the Diamond League Finals

=== Track ===
#	Meeting	100 m	200 m	400 m	800 m	1500 m	5000 m	110 m h	400 m h	3000 m st
1	Xiamen	Christian Coleman (USA); 10.13 SB	-	-	Marco Arop (CAN); 1:43.61 WL	-	Lamecha Girma (ETH); 12:58.96 MR, SB	Daniel Roberts (USA); 13.11 SB	-	-
2	Shanghai/Suzhou	Akani Simbine (RSA); 10.01 =SB	-	-	Slimane Moula (ALG); 1:44.55 SB	-	Selemon Barega (ETH); 12:55.68 MR, SB	Daniel Roberts (USA); 13.12	-	-
3	Doha	-	Kenny Bednarek (USA); 19.67 WL, MR, PB	Steven Gardiner (BAH); 44.76	-	Brian Komen (KEN); 3:32.43	-	-	Alison dos Santos (BRA); 46.86 WL, MR	Samuel Firewu (ETH); 8:07.25 WL, PB
4	Rabat/Marrakech	Emmanuel Eseme (CMR); 10.11 SB	-	Alexander Doom (BEL); 44.51 PB	Emmanuel Wanyonyi (KEN); 1:43.84	Azeddine Habz (FRA); 3:32.86 SB	-	-	-	Soufiane El Bakkali (MAR); 8:09.40 SB
5	Eugene	Christian Coleman (USA); 9.95 SB	Kenny Bednarek (USA); 19.89	-	-	Josh Kerr (GBR); 3:45.34 NR, WL, PB (Mile)	-	Grant Holloway (USA); 13.03 WL	Gerald Drummond (CRC); 48.56 SB	-
6	Oslo	Akani Simbine (RSA); 9.94 SB	-	Matthew Hudson-Smith (GBR); 44.07 AR	-	Jakob Ingebrigtsen (NOR); 3:29.74 WL	Hagos Gebrhiwet (ETH); 12:36.73 NR, WL, MR	-	Alison dos Santos (BRA); 46.63 WL	-
7	Stockholm	Emmanuel Eseme (CMR); 10.16	-	-	Djamel Sedjati (ALG); 1:43.23 WL	Robert Farken (GER); 3:33.53	Narve Gilje Nordås (NOR); 7:33.49 PB (3000 m)	-	Alison dos Santos (BRA); 47.01	Lamecha Girma (ETH); 8:01.63 WL
8	Paris	-	Alexander Ogando (DOM); 19.98 SB	-	Djamel Sedjati (ALG); 1:41.56 NR, WL, PB	-	Jacob Krop (KEN); 7:28.83 (3000m)	Sasha Zhoya (FRA); 13.15 =PB	Alison dos Santos (BRA); 47.78	Abrham Sime (ETH); 8:02.36 PB
9	Monaco	-	Letsile Tebogo (BOT); 19.87	Quincy Hall (USA); 43.80 WL, PB	Djamel Sedjati (ALG); 1:41.46 NR, WL, DLR, MR, PB	Jakob Ingebrigtsen (NOR); 3:26.73 AR, WL, PB	-	Grant Holloway (USA); 13.01	Rai Benjamin (USA); 46.67	-
10	London	Noah Lyles (USA); 9.81 PB	-	Matthew Hudson-Smith (GBR); 43.74 AR, WL, MR, PB	-	Olli Hoare (AUS); 3:49.03 SB (Mile)	Dominic Lobalu (SUI); 7:27.68 MR, NR, PB (3000 m)	-	Alison dos Santos (BRA); 47.18	-
11	Lausanne	-	Letsile Tebogo (BOT); 19.64	Matthew Hudson-Smith (GBR); 43.96	Emmanuel Wanyonyi (KEN); 1:41.11 WL, DLR, MR, PB	Jakob Ingebrigtsen (NOR); 3:27.83 MR	-	Rasheed Broadbell (JAM); 13.10	-	-
12	Silesia	Fred Kerley (USA); 9.87 =MR	Letsile Tebogo (BOT); 19.83 MR	-	Marco Arop (CAN); 1:41.86 MR	-	Jakob Ingebrigtsen (NOR); 7:17.55 WR, AR (3000m)	Grant Holloway (USA); 13.04	Karsten Warholm (NOR); 46.95 MR	Soufiane El Bakkali (MAR); 8:04.29 SB
13	Rome	Letsile Tebogo (BOT); 9.87	-	Muzala Samukonga (ZAM); 43.99	-	-	Hagos Gebrhiwet (ETH); 12:51.07	Sasha Zhoya (FRA); 13.18	-	-
14	Zürich	-	Letsile Tebogo (BOT); 19.55	-	-	Yared Nuguse (USA); 3:29.21	-	Grant Holloway (USA); 12.99	Roshawn Clarke (JAM); 47.49 SB	-
15	Brussels; Final	Ackeem Blake (JAM); 9.93	Kenny Bednarek (USA); 19.67	Charlie Dobson (GBR); 44.49	Emmanuel Wanyonyi (KEN); 1:42.70	Jakob Ingebrigtsen (NOR); 3:30.37	Berihu Aregawi (ETH); 12:43.66 SB	Sasha Zhoya (FRA); 13.16	Alison dos Santos (BRA); 47.93	Amos Serem (KEN); 8:06.90

=== Field ===
#	Meeting	Long jump	Triple jump	High jump	Pole vault	Shot put	Discus	Javelin
1	Xiamen	-	Pedro Pichardo (POR); 17.51 m MR, SB	Shelby McEwen (USA); 2.27 m MR	Armand Duplantis (SWE); 6.24 m WR	-	-	-
2	Shanghai/Suzhou	Marquis Dendy (USA); 8.05 m =SB	-	Hamish Kerr (NZL); 2.31 m	Armand Duplantis (SWE); 6.00 m	-	-	-
3	Doha	Carey McLeod (JAM); 8.52 m w	-	-	-	-	Kristjan Čeh (SLO); 70.48 m	Jakub Vadlejch (CZE); 88.38 m SB
4	Rabat/Marrakech	-	Lázaro Martínez (CUB); 17.10 m MR, SB	-	-	-	Mykolas Alekna (LTU); 70.70 m	-
5	Eugene	-	-	-	-	Joe Kovacs (USA); 23.13 m WL	-	-
6	Oslo	-	Hugues Fabrice Zango (BFA); 17.27 m	-	KC Lightfoot (USA); 5.82 m	-	Mykolas Alekna (LTU); 70.91 m MR	-
7	Stockholm	-	-	-	Armand Duplantis (SWE); 6.00 m	-	Mykolas Alekna (LTU); 68.64 m	-
8	Paris	-	-	-	Armand Duplantis (SWE); 6.00 m	-	-	Julian Weber (GER); 85.91 m
9	Monaco	-	-	Hamish Kerr (NZL); 2.33 m =PB	-	-	-	-
10	London	-	-	Hamish Kerr (NZL); 2.30 m	-	Leonardo Fabbri (ITA); 22.52 m	-	-
11	Lausanne	Miltiadis Tentoglou (GRE); 8.06 m	-	-	Armand Duplantis (SWE); 6.15 m MR	-	-	Anderson Peters (GRD); 90.61 m
12	Silesia	-	-	Gianmarco Tamberi (ITA); 2.31 m	Armand Duplantis (SWE); 6.26 m WR	Joe Kovacs (USA); 22.14 m	-	-
13	Rome	-	Andy Díaz Hernández (ITA); 17.32 m	Woo Sang-hyeok (KOR); 2.30 m	-	Ryan Crouser (USA); 22.49 m MR	Kristjan Čeh (SLO); 68.61 m	-
14	Zürich	Wayne Pinnock (JAM); 8.18 m	-	-	Armand Duplantis (SWE); 5.82 m	Ryan Crouser (USA); 22.66 m	-	Anderson Peters (GRN); 85.72 m
15	Brussels; Final	Tajay Gayle (JAM); 8.28 m SB	Pedro Pichardo (POR); 17.33 m	Gianmarco Tamberi (ITA); 2.34 m	Armand Duplantis (SWE); 6.11 m MR	Leonardo Fabbri (ITA); 22.98 m MR, NR, PB	Matthew Denny (AUS); 69.96 m MR, NR, PB	Anderson Peters (GRN); 87.87 m

== Women's results ==
Denotes the event was not included as part of qualification for the Diamond League Finals

=== Track ===
#	Meeting	100 m	200 m	400 m	800 m	1500 m	5000 m	100 m h	400 m h	3000 m st
1	Xiamen	-	Torrie Lewis (AUS); 22.96 MR	Marileidy Paulino (DOM); 50.08 SB	-	Gudaf Tsegay (ETH); 3:50.30 MR, WL, PB	-	Jasmine Camacho-Quinn (PUR); 12.45 MR, SB	-	Beatrice Chepkoech (KEN); 8:55.40 MR, WL
2	Shanghai/Suzhou	-	Daryll Neita (GBR); 22.62 SB	Marileidy Paulino (DOM); 50.89	-	-	Mekedes Alemeshete (ETH); 14:36.70	Jasmine Camacho-Quinn (PUR); 12.63	-	Beatrice Chepkoech (KEN); 9:07.36
3	Doha	Daryll Neita (GBR); 10.98 SB	-	-	Mary Moraa (KEN); 1:57.91 SB	Freweyni Hailu (ETH); 4:00.42	Beatrice Chebet (KEN); 14:26.98 WL, MR	Ditaji Kambundji (SUI); 12.49 SB	-	-
4	Rabat/Marrakech	-	Shericka Jackson (JAM); 22.86 SB	-	Prudence Sekgodiso (RSA); 1:57.26 WL, PB	-	Medina Eisa (ETH); 14:34.16	-	Rushell Clayton (JAM); 53.98	-
5	Eugene	Sha'Carri Richardson (USA); 10.83 SB	-	-	Keely Hodgkinson (GBR); 1:55.78 WL	Diribe Welteji (ETH); 3:53.75 PB	Tsigie Gebreselama (ETH); 14:18.78 WL, PB	Cyréna Samba-Mayela (FRA); 12.52	-	Peruth Chemutai (UGA); 8:55.09 NR, WL, PB
6	Oslo	-	Brittany Brown (USA); 22.32 SB	Marileidy Paulino (DOM); 49.30 SB	Prudence Sekgodiso (RSA); 1:58.66	-	Georgia Griffith (AUS); 8:24.20 AR, MR (3000 m)	-	Rushell Clayton (JAM); 54.02	-
7	Stockholm	Gina Bass-Bittaye (GAM); 11.15	Shericka Jackson (JAM); 22.69 SB	-	Jemma Reekie (GBR); 1:57.79	Laura Muir (GBR); 3:57.99	-	-	Femke Bol (NED); 53.07 SB	-
8	Paris	Patrizia van der Weken (LUX); 11.06	-	Marileidy Paulino (DOM); 49.20 SB	-	Faith Kipyegon (KEN); 3:49.04 WR	-	-	-	Winfred Yavi (BHR); 9:03.68 SB
9	Monaco	Julien Alfred (LCA); 10.85	-	Rhasidat Adeleke (IRL); 49.17	-	Jessica Hull (AUS); 5:19.70 WR (2000 m)	Margaret Akidor (KEN); 14:39.49 PB	-	-	-
10	London	-	Gabrielle Thomas (USA); 21.82 MR	Nickisha Pryce (JAM); 48.57 WL, NR, DLR, MR, PB	Keely Hodgkinson (GBR); 1:54.61 WL, MR, NR, PB	-	-	-	Femke Bol (NED); 51.30 DLR, MR	-
11	Lausanne	Dina Asher-Smith (GBR); 10.88 SB	-	-	Mary Moraa (KEN); 1:57.91	-	Diribe Welteji (ETH); 8:21.50 MR, PB (3000 m)	Jasmine Camacho-Quinn (PUR); 12.35 =SB	Femke Bol (NED); 52.25 MR	-
12	Silesia	Tia Clayton (JAM); 10.83 w	-	Marileidy Paulino (DOM); 48.66 MR	Nelly Chepchirchir (KEN); 2:31.24 WL, MR (1000m)	Diribe Welteji (ETH); 3:57.08	-	Ackera Nugent (JAM); 12.29 MR	Femke Bol (NED); 52.13 MR	-
13	Rome	-	Brittany Brown (USA); 22.00	-	-	Faith Kipyegon (KEN); 3:52.89	-	Ackera Nugent (JAM); 12.24 WL, MR, NR, PB	Anna Cockrell (USA); 52.59	Winfred Yavi (BHR); 8:44.39 AR, WL, MR, PB
14	Zürich	Sha'Carri Richardson (USA); 10.84	-	-	Mary Moraa (KEN); 1:57.08	-	Beatrice Chebet (KEN); 14:09.52 WL, MR	Jasmine Camacho-Quinn (PUR); 12.36	Shiann Salmon (JAM); 52.97 PB	-
15	Brussels; Final	Julien Alfred (LCA); 10.88	Brittany Brown (USA); 22.20	Marileidy Paulino (DOM); 49.45	Mary Moraa (KEN); 1:56.56 SB	Faith Kipyegon (KEN); 3:54.75 MR	Beatrice Chebet (KEN); 14:09.82 MR	Jasmine Camacho-Quinn (PUR); 12.38	Femke Bol (NED); 52.45	Faith Cherotich (KEN); 9:02.36

=== Field ===
#	Meeting	Long jump	Triple jump	High jump	Pole vault	Shot put	Discus	Javelin
1	Xiamen	-	-	-	-	Gong Lijiao (CHN); 19.72 m MR, SB	Valarie Allman (USA); 69.80 m MR, SB	Qianqian Dai (CHN); 61.25 m
2	Shanghai/Suzhou	Marthe Koala (BUR); 6.68 m SB	-	-	-	Chase Jackson (USA); 20.03 m SB	Valarie Allman (USA); 69.86 m	Haruka Kitaguchi (JPN); 62.97 m SB
3	Doha	-	-	Angelina Topić (SRB); 1.94 m	Molly Caudery (GBR); 4.73 m	-	-	-
4	Rabat/Marrakech	-	-	Angelina Topić (SRB); 1.98 m NR, PB	Angelica Moser (SUI); 4.73 m SB	Chase Jackson (USA); 20.00 m MR	-	-
5	Eugene	-	Leyanis Pérez Hernández (CUB); 14.73 m	-	Emily Grove (USA); 4.63 m SB	-	Valarie Allman (USA); 67.36 m	-
6	Oslo	-	-	-	-	-	Bin Feng (CHN); 67.89 m SB	-
7	Stockholm	-	Leyanis Pérez Hernández (CUB); 14.67 m	Yaroslava Mahuchikh (UKR); 2.00 m	-	Chase Jackson (USA); 20.00 m	-	-
8	Paris	Larissa Iapichino (ITA); 6.82 m	-	Yaroslava Mahuchikh (UKR); 2.10 m WR	-	-	Valarie Allman (USA); 68.07 m	-
9	Monaco	-	Leyanis Pérez Hernández (CUB); 14.96 m SB	-	Nina Kennedy (AUS); 4.88 m SB	-	-	Haruka Kitaguchi (JPN); 65.21 m SB
10	London	Malaika Mihambo (GER); 6.87 m	-	-	Nina Kennedy (AUS); 4.85 m	-	-	Mackenzie Little (AUS); 66.27 m PB
11	Lausanne	-	-	Yaroslava Mahuchikh (UKR); 1.99 m	-	Chase Jackson (USA); 20.64 m SB	-	-
12	Silesia	-	Shanieka Ricketts (JAM); 14.50 m	-	-	-	-	Adriana Vilagoš (SRB); 65.60 m NR
13	Rome	Tara Davis-Woodhall (USA); 7.02 m	-	-	Nina Kennedy (AUS); 4.83 m	-	-	-
14	Zürich	-	-	Yaroslava Mahuchikh (UKR); 1.96 m	Nina Kennedy (AUS); 4.87 m	-	-	-
15	Brussels; Final	Larissa Iapichino (ITA); 6.80 m	Leyanis Pérez Hernández (CUB); 14.37 m	Yaroslava Mahuchikh (UKR); 1.97 m	Nina Kennedy (AUS); 4.88 m	Sarah Mitton (CAN); 20.25 m	Valarie Allman (USA); 68.47 m	Haruka Kitaguchi (JAP); 66.13 m SB

== Diamond League Disciplines ==
Xiamen Diamond League
20 April 2024
200 metres Women	Torrie Lewis (AUS)	22.96 MR	Sha'Carri Richardson (USA)	22.99 SB	Tamara Clark (USA)	23.01
400 metres Women	Marileidy Paulino (DOM)	50.08 SB	Natalia Kaczmarek (POL)	50.29 SB	Britton Wilson (USA)	51.26
1500 metres/Mile Women	Gudaf Tsegay (ETH)	3:50.30 MR, WL, PB	Birke Haylom (ETH)	3:53.22 PB	Worknesh Mesele (ETH)	3:57.61 SB
3000 metres steeplechase Women	Beatrice Chepkoech (KEN)	8:55.40 MR, WL	Faith Cherotich (KEN)	9:05.49 SB	Peruth Chemutai (UGA)	9:12.99 SB
100 metres hurdles Women	Jasmine Camacho-Quinn (PUR)	12.45 MR, SB	Devynne Charlton (BAH)	12.49 SB	Cyréna Samba-Mayela (FRA)	12.55 NR, PB
Shot Put Women	Gong Lijiao (CHN)	19.72 m (64 ft 8 1/4 in) MR, SB	Maddison-Lee Wesche (NZL)	19.63 m (64 ft 4 3/4 in) PB	Chase Jackson (USA)	19.62 m (64 ft 4 1/4 in)
Discus Women	Valarie Allman (USA)	69.80 m (229 ft 0 in) MR, SB	Yaimé Pérez (CUB)	68.83 m (225 ft 9 3/4 in)	Bin Feng (CHN)	67.07 m (220 ft 1/2 in) SB
100 metres Men	Christian Coleman (USA)	10.13 SB	Fred Kerley (USA)	10.17	Ackeem Blake (JAM)	10.20 SB
800 metres Men	Marco Arop (CAN)	1:43.61 WL	Wyclife Kinyamal (KEN)	1:43.66 SB	Tshepiso Masalela (BOT)	1:43.88 PB
3000/5000 metres Men	Lamecha Girma (ETH)	12:58.96 MR, SB	Nicholas Kipkorir Kimeli (KEN)	12:59.78 SB	Birhanu Balew (BHR)	13:00.47 SB
110 metres hurdles Men	Daniel Roberts (USA)	13.11 WL	Cordell Tinch (USA)	13.16 SB	Shunsuke Izumiya (JPN)	13.17 SB
High Jump Men	Shelby McEwen (USA)	2.27 m (7 ft 5 1/4 in) MR	Mutaz Essa Barshim (QAT)	2.27 m (7 ft 5 1/4 in) =MR, SB	Hamish Kerr (NZL)	2.24 m (7 ft 4 in)
Pole Vault Men	Armand Duplantis (SWE)	6.24 m (20 ft 5 1/2 in) WR	Sam Kendricks (USA)	5.82 m (19 ft 1 in)	Huang Bokai (CHN)	5.72 m (18 ft 9 in) SB
Triple Jump Men	Pedro Pichardo (POR)	17.51 m (57 ft 5 1/4 in) MR, SB	Hugues Fabrice Zango (BFA)	17.12 m (56 ft 2 in)	Su Wen (CHN)	16.82 m (55 ft 2 in) SB
Shanghai Diamond League
27 April 2024
200 metres Women	Daryll Neita (GBR)	22.62 SB	Anavia Battle (USA)	22.99	Sha'Carri Richardson (USA)	23.11
400 metres Women	Marileidy Paulino (DOM)	50.89	Talitha Diggs (USA)	51.77	Sada Williams (BAR)	52.00
3000 metres Steeplechase Women	Beatrice Chepkoech (KEN)	9:07.36	Peruth Chemutai (UGA)	9:15.46	Gesa Felicitas Krause (GER)	9:16.24 SB
100 metres hurdles Women	Jasmine Camacho-Quinn (PUR)	12.63	Devynne Charlton (BAH)	12.64	Danielle Williams (JAM)	12.74
Long Jump Women	Marthe Koala (BUR)	6.68 m (21 ft 10 3/4 in) SB	Quanesha Burks (USA)	6.59 m (21 ft 7 1/4 in)	Milica Gardašević (SRB)	6.52 m (21 ft 4 1/2 in)
Shot Put Women	Chase Jackson (USA)	20.03 m (65 ft 8 1/2 in) SB	Sarah Mitton (CAN)	19.86 m (65 ft 1 3/4 in)	Song Jiayuan (CHN)	19.83 m (65 ft 1/2 in) SB
Javelin Women	Haruka Kitaguchi (JPN)	62.97 m (206 ft 7 in) SB	Mackenzie Little (AUS)	62.12 m (203 ft 9 1/2 in) SB	Flor Ruiz (COL)	60.70 m (199 ft 1 3/4 in) SB
100 metres Men	Akani Simbine (RSA)	10.01 =SB	Christian Coleman (USA)	10.04	Fred Kerley (USA)	10.11 SB
800 metres Men	Slimane Moula (ALG)	1:44.55 SB	Wyclife Kinyamal (KEN)	1:44.88	Clayton Murphy (USA)	1:45.18 SB
3000/5000 metres Men	Selemon Barega (ETH)	12:55.68 MR, SB	Biniam Mehary (ETH)	12:56.37 SB	Benson Kiplangat (KEN)	12:58.78 PB
110 metres hurdles Men	Daniel Roberts (USA)	13.12	Shunsuke Izumiya (JPN)	13.23	Hansle Parchment (JAM)	13.26 SB
High Jump Men	Hamish Kerr (NZL)	2.31 m (7 ft 6 3/4 in)	Mutaz Essa Barshim (QAT)	2.29 m (7 ft 6 in) SB	Vernon Turner (USA)	2.27 m (7 ft 5 1/4 in) SB
Pole Vault Men	Armand Duplantis (SWE)	6.00 m (19 ft 8 in) MR	Ben Broeders (BEL)	5.82 m (19 ft 1 in) SB	Sam Kendricks (USA)	5.82 m (19 ft 1 in)
Long Jump Men	Marquis Dendy (USA)	8.05 m (26 ft 4 3/4 in) =SB	Wang Jianan (CHN)	8.04 m (26 ft 4 1/2 in) SB	Shi Yuhao (CHN)	7.99 m (26 ft 2 1/2 in)
Doha Diamond League
10 May 2024
100 metres Women	Daryll Neita (GBR)	10.98 SB	Tamari Davis (USA)	10.99	Celera Barnes (USA)	11.02 SB
800 metres Women	Mary Moraa (KEN)	1:57.91 SB	Jemma Reekie (GBR)	1:58.42	Noélie Yarigo (BEN)	1:58.70 SB
1500 metres/Mile Women	Freweyni Hailu (ETH)	4:00.42	Jessica Hull (AUS)	4:00.84 SB	Nelly Chepchirchir (KEN)	4:01.19 SB
3000/5000 metres Women	Beatrice Chebet (KEN)	14:26.98 WL, MR	Ejgayehu Taye (ETH)	14:29.26 SB	Medina Eisa (ETH)	14:34.11 SB
100 metres hurdles Women	Ditaji Kambundji (SUI)	12.49 SB	Tonea Marshall (USA)	12.51	Pia Skrzyszowska (POL)	12.53 SB
High Jump Women	Angelina Topić (SRB)	1.94 m (6 ft 4 1/4 in)	Iryna Gerashchenko (UKR)	1.91 m (6 ft 3 in) SB	Eleanor Patterson (AUS)	1.91 m (6 ft 3 in)
Pole Vault Women	Molly Caudery (GBR)	4.73 m (15 ft 6 in)	Nina Kennedy (AUS)	4.73 m (15 ft 6 in) SB	Tina Sutej (SLO)	4.63 m (15 ft 2 1/4 in)
200 metres Men	Kenny Bednarek (USA)	19.67 WL, MR, PB	Courtney Lindsey (USA)	20.01	Kyree King (USA)	20.21
400 metres Men	Steven Gardiner (BAH)	44.76	Muzala Samukonga (ZAM)	45.07 SB	Leungo Scotch (BOT)	45.29
1500 metres/Mile Men	Brian Komen (KEN)	3:32.43	Timothy Cheruiyot (KEN)	3:32.67 SB	Reynold Kipkorir Cheruiyot (KEN)	3:32.96
3000 metres Steeplechase Men	Samuel Firewu (ETH)	8:07.25 WL, PB	Abraham Kibiwot (KEN)	8:07.38 SB	Getnet Wale (ETH)	8:09.69 SB
400 metres Hurdles Men	Alison dos Santos (BRA)	46.86 WL, MR	CJ Allen (USA)	48.39 SB	Wilfried Happio (FRA)	49.10 SB
Long Jump Men	Carey McLeod (JAM)	8.52 m (27 ft 11 1/4 in)w	Miltiadis Tentoglou (GRE)	8.36 m (27 ft 5 in) SB	Simon Ehammer (SUI)	8.30 m (27 ft 2 3/4 in)w
Javelin Men	Jakub Vadlejch (CZE)	88.38 m (289 ft 11 1/2 in) SB	Neeraj Chopra (IND)	88.36 m (289 ft 10 1/2 in) SB	Anderson Peters (GRN)	86.62 m (284 ft 2 in) SB
Rabat Diamond League
19 May 2024
200 metres Women	Shericka Jackson (JAM)	22.82 SB	Maboundou Koné (CIV)	22.96	Hélène Parisot (FRA)	23.02 PB
800 metres Women	Prudence Sekgodiso (RSA)	1:57.26 WL, PB	Habitam Alemu (ETH)	1:57.70 SB	Noélie Yarigo (BEN)	1:59.96
3000/5000 metres Women	Medina Eisa (ETH)	14:34.16	Fotyen Tesfay (ETH)	14:34.21 PB	Edinah Jebitok (KEN)	14:35.64 PB
400 metres Hurdles Women	Rushell Clayton (JAM)	53.98	Shiann Salmon (JAM)	54.27 SB	Anna Ryzhykova (UKR)	55.09 SB
High Jump Women	Angelina Topić (SRB)	1.98 m (6 ft 5 3/4 in) NR, PB	Christina Honsel (GER)	1.91 m (6 ft 3 in) SB	Lia Apostolovski (SLO)	1.91 m (6 ft 3 in) SB
Pole Vault Women	Angelica Moser (SUI)	4.73 m (15 ft 6 in) SB	Roberta Bruni (ITA)	4.65 m (15 ft 3 in) SB	Elisa Molinarolo (ITA)	4.55 m (14 ft 11 in) SB
Shot Put Women	Chase Jackson (USA)	20.00 m (65 ft 7 1/4 in) MR	Yemisi Ogunleye (GER)	19.40 m (63 ft 7 3/4 in) SB	Sarah Mitton (CAN)	19.36 m (63 ft 6 in)
100 metres Men	Emmanuel Eseme (CMR)	10.11 SB	Andre De Grasse (CAN)	10.19	Jeremiah Azu (GBR)	10.25
400 metres Men	Alexander Doom (BEL)	44.51 PB	Muzala Samukonga (ZAM)	44.54 SB	Bayapo Ndori (BOT)	44.59
800 metres Men	Emmanuel Wanyonyi (KEN)	1:43.84	Wyclife Kinyamal (KEN)	1:43.98	Yanis Meziane (FRA)	1:44.13 SB
1500 metres/Mile Men	Azeddine Habz (FRA)	3:32.86 SB	George Mills (GBR)	3:33.47 SB	Elliot Giles (GBR)	3:33.50 SB
3000 metres steeplechase Men	Soufiane El Bakkali (MAR)	8:09.40 SB	Getnet Wale (ETH)	8:09.78	Amos Serem (KEN)	8:10.82 SB
Triple Jump Men	Lázaro Martínez (CUB)	17.10 m (56 ft 1 in) MR, SB	Pedro Pichardo (POR)	16.92 m (55 ft 6 in)	Almir dos Santos (BRA)	16.90 m (55 ft 5 1/4 in)
Discus Men	Mykolas Alekna (LTU)	70.70 m (231 ft 11 1/4 in)	Matthew Denny (AUS)	67.74 m (222 ft 2 3/4 in)	Daniel Ståhl (SWE)	67.49 m (221 ft 5 in)
Eugene Diamond League
25 May 2024
100 metres Women	Sha'Carri Richardson (USA)	10.83 SB	Julien Alfred (LCA)	10.93 SB	Dina Asher-Smith (GBR)	10.98 SB
800 metres Women	Keely Hodgkinson (GBR)	1:55.78 WL	Mary Moraa (KEN)	1:56.71 SB	Jemma Reekie (GBR)	1:57.45 SB
1500 metres/Mile Women	Diribe Welteji (ETH)	3:53.75 PB	Jessica Hull (AUS)	3:55.97 AR, PB	Elle St. Pierre (USA)	3:56.00 PB
3000/5000 metres Women	Tsigie Gebreselama (ETH)	14:18.76 WL, PB	Ejgayehu Taye (ETH)	14:18.92 SB	Freweyni Hailu (ETH)	14:20.61 PB
3000 metres Steeplechase Women	Peruth Chemutai (UGA)	8:55.09 NR, WL, MR	Beatrice Chepkoech (KEN)	8:56.51	Faith Cherotich (KEN)	9:04.45 SB
Pole Vault Women	Emily Grove (USA)	4.63 m (15 ft 2 1/4 in) SB	Katie Moon (USA)	4.53 m (14 ft 10 1/4 in)	Robeilys Peinado (VEN)	4.53 m (14 ft 10 1/4 in) SB
Triple Jump Women	Leyanis Pérez Hernández (CUB)	14.73 m (48 ft 3 3/4 in)	Thea Lafond (DMA)	14.62 m (47 ft 11 1/2 in)	Shanieka Ricketts (JAM)	14.55 m (47 ft 8 3/4 in) SB
Discus Women	Valarie Allman (USA)	67.36 m (220 ft 11 3/4 in)	Yaimé Pérez (CUB)	67.25 m (220 ft 7 1/2 in)	Jorinde van Klinken (NED)	64.88 m (212 ft 10 1/4 in) SB
100 metres Men	Christian Coleman (USA)	9.95 SB	Ferdinand Omanyala (KEN)	9.98 SB	CJ Allen (USA)	10.08
200 metres Men	Kenny Bednarek (USA)	19.89	Courtney Lindsey (USA)	20.09	Kyree King (USA)	20.15
1500 metres/Mile Men	Josh Kerr (GBR)	3:45.34 NR, WL, PB	Jakob Ingebrigtsen (NOR)	3:45.60 SB	Yared Nuguse (USA)	3:46.22 SB
110 metres hurdles Men	Grant Holloway (USA)	13.03 WL	Daniel Roberts (USA)	13.13	Freddie Crittenden (USA)	13.16 SB
400 metres hurdles Men	Gerald Drummond (CRC)	48.56 SB	Rasmus Mägi (EST)	48.85 SB	CJ Allen (USA)	48.99
Shot Put Men	Joe Kovacs (USA)	23.13 m (75 ft 10 1/2 in) WL	Payton Otterdahl (USA)	22.16 m (72 ft 8 1/4 in)	Chukwuebuka Enekwechi (NGR)	21.91 m (71 ft 10 1/2 in) NR, PB
Oslo Diamond League
30 May 2024
200 metres Women	Brittany Brown (USA)	22.32 SB	Marie-Josée Ta Lou-Smith (CIV)	22.36 SB	Daryll Neita (GBR)	22.50 SB
400 metres Women	Marileidy Paulino (DOM)	49.30 SB	Natalia Kaczmarek (POL)	49.80 SB	Alexis Holmes (USA)	50.40
800 metres Women	Prudence Sekgodiso (RSA)	1:58.66	Natoya Goule-Toppin (JAM)	1:59.10 SB	Catriona Bisset (AUS)	1:59.29
3000/5000 metres Women	Georgia Griffith (AUS)	8:24.20 AR, MR	Likina Amebaw (ETH)	8:24.29 PB	Jessica Hull (AUS)	8:25.82
400 metres hurdles Women	Rushell Clayton (JAM)	54.02	Andrenette Knight (JAM)	54.63 SB	Janieve Russell (JAM)	55.07 SB
Discus Women	Bin Feng (CHN)	67.89 m (222 ft 8 3/4 in) SB	Sandra Perković Elkasević (CRO)	64.48 m (211 ft 6 1/2 in) SB	Daisy Osakue (ITA)	63.29 m (207 ft 7 1/2 in)
100 metres Men	Akani Simbine (RSA)	9.94 SB	Abdul Hakim Sani Brown (JPN)	9.99 SB	Emmanuel Eseme (CMR)	10.01 SB
400 metres Men	Matthew Hudson-Smith (GBR)	44.07 AR	Kirani James (GRN)	44.58 SB	Vernon Norwood (USA)	44.68 SB
1500 metres/Mile Men	Jakob Ingebrigtsen (NOR)	3:29.74 WL	Timothy Cheruiyot (KEN)	3:29.77 SB	Azeddine Habz (FRA)	3:30.80 SB
3000/5000 metres Men	Hagos Gebrhiwet (ETH)	12:36.73 NR, WL, MR	Yomif Kejelcha (ETH)	12:38.95 PB	Jacob Kiplimo (UGA)	12:40.96 PB
400 metres hurdles Men	Alison dos Santos (BRA)	46.63 WL	Karsten Warholm (NOR)	46.70 SB	Kyron McMaster (IVB)	48.49 SB
Pole Vault Men	KC Lightfoot (USA)	5.82 m (19 ft 1 in)	Emmanouil Karalis (GRE)	5.72 m (18 ft 9 in)	Ernest John Obiena (PHI)	5.72 m (18 ft 9 in)
Triple Jump Men	Hugues Fabrice Zango (BFA)	17.27 m (56 ft 7 3/4 in)	Yasser Triki (ALG)	17.25 m (56 ft 7 in)	Lázaro Martínez (CUB)	16.85 m (55 ft 3 1/4 in)
Discus Men	Mykolas Alekna (LTU)	70.91 m (232 ft 7 1/2 in) MR	Matthew Denny (AUS)	67.61 m (221 ft 9 3/4 in)	Daniel Ståhl (SWE)	66.80 m (219 ft 1 3/4 in)
Stockholm Diamond League
2 June 2024
100 metres Women	Gina Bass-Bittaye (GAM)	11.15	Marie-Josée Ta Lou-Smith (CIV)	11.16	Brittany Brown (USA)	11.18 SB
200 metres Women	Shericka Jackson (JAM)	22.69 SB	Julia Henriksson (SWE)	22.89 PB	Amy Hunt (GBR)	22.92
1500 metres/Mile Women	Laura Muir (GBR)	3:57.99	Edinah Jebitok (KEN)	3:58.88 PB	Georgia Griffith (AUS)	3:59.17
400 metres hurdles Women	Femke Bol (NED)	53.07 SB	Rushell Clayton (JAM)	53.78	Andrenette Knight (JAM)	54.62 SB
High Jump Women	Yaroslava Mahuchikh (UKR)	2.00 m (6 ft 6 1/2 in)	Imke Onnen (GER)	1.94 m (6 ft 4 1/4 in) =SB	Iryna Gerashchenko (UKR)	1.94 m (6 ft 4 1/4 in)
Triple Jump Women	Leyanis Pérez Hernández (CUB)	14.67 m (48 ft 1 1/2 in)	Shanieka Ricketts (JAM)	14.40 m (47 ft 2 3/4 in)	Thea Lafond (DMA)	14.26 m (46 ft 9 1/4 in)
Shot Put Women	Chase Jackson (USA)	20.00 m (65 ft 7 1/4 in)	Sarah Mitton (CAN)	19.98 m (65 ft 6 1/2 in)	Jessica Schilder (NED)	19.08 m (62 ft 7 in)
100 metres Men	Emmanuel Eseme (CMR)	10.16	Kyree King (USA)	10.18	Chituru Ali (ITA)	10.19
800 metres Men	Djamel Sedjati (ALG)	1:43.23 WL	Bryce Hoppel (USA)	1:44.29	Tshepiso Masalela (BOT)	1:44.44
3000/5000 metres Men	Narve Gilje Nordås (NOR)	7:33.49 PB	Dominic Lokinyomo Lobalu (SUI)	7:33.68 SB	Luis Grijalva (GUA)	7:33.96 SB
3000 metres steeplechase Men	Lamecha Girma (ETH)	8:01.63 WL	Samuel Firewu (ETH)	8:05.78 PB	Mohamed Amin Jhinaoui (TUN)	8:10.41 NR, PB
400 metres hurdles Men	Alison dos Santos (BRA)	47.01	Kyron McMaster (IVB)	48.05 SB	CJ Allen (USA)	48.12 SB
Pole Vault Men	Armand Duplantis (SWE)	6.00 m (19 ft 8 in)	Sam Kendricks (USA)	5.90 m (19 ft 4 1/4 in)	KC Lightfoot (USA)	5.80 m (19 ft 1/4 in)
Discus Men	Mykolas Alekna (LTU)	68.64 m (225 ft 2 1/4 in)	Matthew Denny (AUS)	66.75 m (218 ft 11 3/4 in)	Daniel Ståhl (SWE)	66.10 m (216 ft 10 1/4 in)
Meeting de Paris
7 July 2024
100 metres Women	Patrizia van der Weken (LUX)	11.06	Gina Bass-Bittaye (GAM)	11.09	Ewa Swoboda (POL)	11.16
400 metres Women	Marileidy Paulino (DOM)	49.20 SB	Natalia Kaczmarek (POL)	49.82	Salwa Eid Naser (BHR)	49.82 SB
1500 metres/Mile Women	Faith Kipyegon (KEN)	3:49.04 WR	Jessica Hull (AUS)	3:50.83 AR, PB	Laura Muir (GBR)	3:53.79 NR, PB
3000 metres Steeplechase Women	Winfred Yavi (BHR)	9:03.68 SB	Alice Finot (FRA)	9:05.01 NR, PB	Elizabeth Bird (GBR)	9:09.07 SB
High Jump Women	Yaroslava Mahuchikh (UKR)	2.10 m (6 ft 10 1/2 in) WR	Nicola Olyslagers (AUS)	2.01 m (6 ft 7 in)	Angelina Topić (SRB)	1.98 m (6 ft 5 3/4 in) =NR, =PB
Long Jump Women	Larissa Iapichino (ITA)	6.82 m (22 ft 4 1/2 in)	Plamena Mitkova (BUL)	6.78 m (22 ft 2 3/4 in)	Quanesha Burks (USA)	6.73 m (22 ft 3/4 in)
Discus Women	Valarie Allman (USA)	68.07 m (223 ft 3 3/4 in)	Jorinde van Klinken (NED)	67.23 m (220 ft 6 3/4 in) SB	Alida van Daalen (NED)	65.78 m (215 ft 9 3/4 in)
200 metres Men	Alexander Ogando (DOM)	19.98 SB	Tarsis Orogot (UGA)	20.18	Ryan Zeze (FRA)	20.46
800 metres Men	Djamel Sedjati (ALG)	1:41.56 NR, WL, PB	Emmanuel Wanyonyi (KEN)	1:41.58 PB	Gabriel Tual (FRA)	1:41.61 NR, PB
3000 metres Steeplechase Men	Abrham Sime (ETH)	8:02.36 PB	Amos Serem (KEN)	8:02.36 PB	Abraham Kibiwot (KEN)	8:06.70 SB
110 metres hurdles Men	Sasha Zhoya (FRA)	13.15 =PB	Trey Cunningham (USA)	13.15	Shunsuke Izumiya (JPN)	13.16 SB
400 metres hurdles Men	Alison dos Santos (BRA)	47.78	Rasmus Mägi (EST)	47.95 SB	Malik James-King (JAM)	48.37
Pole Vault Men	Armand Duplantis (SWE)	6.00 m (19 ft 8 in)	Sam Kendricks (USA)	5.95 m (19 ft 6 1/4 in) =SB	Huang Bokai (CHN)	5.85 m (19 ft 2 1/4 in)
Javelin Men	Julian Weber (GER)	85.91 m (281 ft 10 1/4 in)	Anderson Peters (GRN)	85.19 m (279 ft 5 3/4 in)	Jakub Vadlejch (CZE)	85.04 m (279 ft 0 in)
Monaco Diamond League
12 July 2024
100 metres Women	Julien Alfred (LCA)	10.85	Tamari Davis (USA)	10.99	Dina Asher-Smith (GBR)	10.99
400 metres Women	Rhasidat Adeleke (IRL)	49.17	Lieke Klaver (NED)	49.64 PB	Kendall Ellis (USA)	50.39
1500 metres/Mile Women	Jessica Hull (AUS)	5:19.70 WR	Melissa Courtney-Bryant (GBR)	5:26.08 NR	Edinah Jebitok (KEN)	5:26.09 NR
3000/5000 metres Women	Margaret Akidor (KEN)	14:39.49 PB	Likina Amebaw (ETH)	14:40.44	Nozomi Tanaka (JPN)	14:40.86 SB
Pole Vault Women	Nina Kennedy (AUS)	4.88 m (16 ft 0 in) SB	Angelica Moser (SUI)	4.88 m (16 ft 0 in) NR, PB	Molly Caudery (GBR)	4.83 m (15 ft 10 in)
Triple Jump Women	Leyanis Pérez Hernández (CUB)	14.96 m (49 ft 3/4 in) SB	Thea Lafond (DMA)	14.87 m (48 ft 9 1/4 in) SB	Maryna Bekh-Romanchuk (UKR)	14.81 m (48 ft 7 in) SB
Javelin Women	Haruka Kitaguchi (JPN)	65.21 m (213 ft 11 1/4 in) SB	Mackenzie Little (AUS)	64.74 m (212 ft 4 3/4 in) SB	Anete Sietina (LAT)	59.58 m (195 ft 5 1/2 in)
200 metres Men	Letsile Tebogo (BOT)	19.87	Alexander Ogando (DOM)	20.02	Tarsis Orogot (UGA)	20.32
400 metres Men	Quincy Hall (USA)	43.80 WL, PB	Vernon Norwood (USA)	44.34 SB	Lythe Pillay (RSA)	44.58
800 metres Men	Djamel Sedjati (ALG)	1:41.46 NR, WL, DLR, MR, PB	Mohamed Attaoui (ESP)	1:42.04 NR, PB	Gabriel Tual (FRA)	1:42.10
1500 metres/Mile Men	Jakob Ingebrigtsen (NOR)	3:26.73 AR, WL, PB	Timothy Cheruiyot (KEN)	3:28.71 SB	Brian Komen (KEN)	3:28.80 PB
110 metres hurdles Men	Grant Holloway (USA)	13.01	Lorenzo Simonelli (ITA)	13.08	Cordell Tinch (USA)	13.10
400 metres hurdles Men	Rai Benjamin (USA)	46.67	Karsten Warholm (NOR)	46.73	Alison dos Santos (BRA)	47.18
High Jump Men	Hamish Kerr (NZL)	2.33 m (7 ft 7 1/2 in) =PB	Shelby McEwen (USA)	2.31 m (7 ft 6 3/4 in) SB	Stefano Sottile (ITA)	2.28 m (7 ft 5 3/4 in)
London Diamond League
20 July 2024
200 metres Women	Gabrielle Thomas (USA)	21.82 MR	Julien Alfred (LCA)	21.86 NR, PB	Dina Asher-Smith (GBR)	22.07 SB
400 metres Women	Nickisha Pryce (JAM)	48.57 WL, DLR, MR, NR, PB	Natalia Kaczmarek (POL)	48.90 NR, PB	Lieke Klaver (NED)	49.58 PB
800 metres Women	Keely Hodgkinson (GBR)	1:54.61 WL, MR, NR, PB	Jemma Reekie (GBR)	1:55.61 PB	Georgia Bell (GBR)	1:56.28 PB
400 metres hurdles Women	Femke Bol (NED)	51.30 DLR, MR	Shamier Little (USA)	52.78 SB	Rushell Clayton (JAM)	53.24
Pole Vault Women	Nina Kennedy (AUS)	4.85 m (15 ft 10 3/4 in)	Alysha Newman (CAN)	4.75 m (15 ft 7 in)	Molly Caudery (GBR)	4.65 m (15 ft 3 in)
Long Jump Women	Malaika Mihambo (GER)	6.87 m (22 ft 6 1/4 in)	Agate de Sousa (POR)	6.75 m (22 ft 1 1/2 in)	Larissa Iapichino (ITA)	6.70 m (21 ft 11 3/4 in)
Javelin Women	Mackenzie Little (AUS)	66.27 m (217 ft 5 in) PB	Adriana Vilagoš (SRB)	65.58 m (215 ft 1 3/4 in) NR, PB	Maggie Malone-Hardin (USA)	62.99 m (206 ft 7 3/4 in)
100 metres Men	Noah Lyles (USA)	9.81 PB	Akani Simbine (RSA)	9.86 SB	Letsile Tebogo (BOT)	9.88 =NR, =PB
400 metres Men	Matthew Hudson-Smith (GBR)	43.74 AR, WL, MR, PB	Vernon Norwood (USA)	44.10 PB	Jereem Richards (TTO)	44.18 PB
1500 metres/Mile Men	Olli Hoare (AUS)	3:49.03 SB	Narve Gilje Nordås (NOR)	3:49.06 SB	Adel Mechaal (ESP)	3:49.21 SB
3000/5000 metres Men	Dominic Lobalu (SUI)	7:27.68 MR, NR, PB	Grant Fisher (USA)	7:27.99 SB	Edwin Kurgat (KEN)	7:28.53 PB
400 metres hurdles Men	Alison dos Santos (BRA)	47.18	Roshawn Clarke (JAM)	47.63 SB	Ismail Abakar (QAT)	47.72 PB
High Jump Men	Hamish Kerr (NZL)	2.30 m (7 ft 6 1/2 in)	JuVaughn Harrison (USA)	2.26 m (7 ft 4 3/4 in)	William Grimsey (GBR)	2.22 m (7 ft 3 1/4 in)
Shot Put Men	Leonardo Fabbri (ITA)	22.52 m (73 ft 10 1/2 in)	Ryan Crouser (USA)	22.37 m (73 ft 4 1/2 in)	Payton Otterdahl (USA)	22.13 m (72 ft 7 1/4 in)
Lausanne Diamond League
22 August 2024
100 metres Women	Dina Asher-Smith (GBR)	10.88 SB	Tamari Davis (USA)	10.97	Mujinga Kambundji (SUI)	11.06
800 metres Women	Mary Moraa (KEN)	1:57.91	Georgia Bell (GBR)	1:58.53	Jemma Reekie (GBR)	1:58.73
5000/3000 metres Women	Diribe Welteji (ETH)	8:21.50	Janeth Chepngetich (KEN)	8:23.48	Tsigie Gebreselama (ETH)	8:24.40
100 metres hurdles Women	Jasmine Camacho-Quinn (PUR)	12.35 =SB	Grace Stark (USA)	12.38	Ackera Nugent (JAM)	12.38
400 metres hurdles Women	Femke Bol (NED)	52.25	Rushell Clayton (JAM)	53.32	Janieve Russell (JAM)	54.48
High Jump Women	Yaroslava Mahuchikh (UKR)	1.99 m (6 ft 6 1/4 in)	Eleanor Patterson (AUS)	1.96 m (6 ft 5 in) SB	Nicola Olyslagers (AUS)	1.92 m (6 ft 3 1/2 in)
Shot Put Women	Chase Jackson (USA)	20.64 m (67 ft 8 1/2 in) SB	Yemisi Ogunleye (GER)	19.55 m (64 ft 1 1/2 in)	Sarah Mitton (CAN)	19.52 m (64 ft 1/2 in)
200 metres Men	Letsile Tebogo (BOT)	19.64	Erriyon Knighton (USA)	19.78	Fred Kerley (USA)	19.86 SB
400 metres Men	Matthew Hudson-Smith (GBR)	43.96	Muzala Samukonga (ZAM)	44.06	Busang Kebinatshipi (BOT)	44.22 PB
1500 metres/Mile Men	Jakob Ingebrigtsen (NOR)	3:27.83 MR	Cole Hocker (USA)	3:29.85	Hobbs Kessler (USA)	3:30.47
110 metres hurdles Men	Rasheed Broadbell (JAM)	13.10	Grant Holloway (USA)	13.14	Hansle Parchment (JAM)	13.23
Pole Vault Men	Armand Duplantis (SWE)	6.15 m (20 ft 2 in) MR	Sam Kendricks (USA)	5.92 m (19 ft 5 in)	Sondre Guttormsen (NOR); Kurtis Marschall (AUS); EJ Obiena (PHI)	5.82 m (19 ft 1 in) SB; 5.82 m (19 ft 1 in); 5.82 m (19 ft 1 in)
Long Jump Men	Miltiadis Tentoglou (GRE)	8.06 m (26 ft 5 1/4 in)	Wayne Pinnock (JAM)	8.01 m (26 ft 3 1/4 in)	Simon Ehammer (SUI)	7.99 m (26 ft 2 1/2 in)
Javelin Men	Anderson Peters (GRN)	90.61 m (297 ft 3 1/4 in)	Neeraj Chopra (IND)	89.49 m (293 ft 7 in)	Julian Weber (GER)	87.08 m (285 ft 8 1/4 in)
Silesia Diamond League
25 August 2024
100 metres Women	Tia Clayton (JAM)	10.83 w	Marie Josée Ta Lou-Smith (CIV)	10.83 w	Tamari Davis (USA)	10.84 w
400 metres Women	Marileidy Paulino (DOM)	48.66 MR	Salwa Eid Naser (BHR)	49.23	Natalia Kaczmarek (POL)	49.95
1500 metres/Mile Women	Diribe Welteji (ETH)	3:57.08	Freweyni Hailu (ETH)	3:57.88	Georgia Bell (GBR)	3:58.11
100 metres hurdles Women	Ackera Nugent (JAM)	12.29 MR	Grace Stark (USA)	12.37	Danielle Williams (JAM)	12.38
400 metres hurdles Women	Femke Bol (NED)	52.13 MR	Anna Cockrell (USA)	52.88	Rushell Clayton (JAM)	53.11
Triple Jump Women	Shanieka Ricketts (JAM)	14.50 m (47 ft 6 3/4 in)	Leyanis Pérez Hernández (CUB)	14.42 m (47 ft 3 1/2 in)	Dariya Derkach (ITA)	14.02 m (45 ft 11 3/4 in)
Javelin Women	Adriana Vilagoš (SRB)	65.60 m (215 ft 2 1/2 in) NR	Jo-Ane van Dyk (RSA)	62.81 m (206 ft 3/4 in)	Nikola Ogrodníková (CZE)	61.84 m (202 ft 10 1/2 in)
200 metres Men	Letsile Tebogo (BOT)	19.83 MR	Alexander Ogando (DOM)	19.86 NR	Kenneth Bednarek (USA)	20.00
800 metres Men	Marco Arop (CAN)	1:41.86 MR	Emmanuel Wanyonyi (KEN)	1:43.23	Bryce Hoppel (USA)	1:43.32
3000/5000 metres Men	Jakob Ingebrigtsen (NOR)	7:17.55 WR	Berihu Aregawi (ETH)	7:21.28 NR	Yomif Kejelcha (ETH)	7:28.44
3000 metres steeplechase Men	Soufiane El Bakkali (MAR)	8:04.29 PB	Amos Serem (KEN)	8:04.29	Samuel Firewu (ETH)	8:04.34 PB
High Jump Men	Gianmarco Tamberi (ITA)	2.31 m (7 ft 6 3/4 in)	Romaine Beckford (JAM)	2.29 m (7 ft 6 in) SB	Oleh Doroshchuk (UKR)	2.29 m (7 ft 6 in)
Pole Vault Men	Armand Duplantis (SWE)	6.26 m (20 ft 6 1/4 in) WR PB	Sam Kendricks (USA)	6.00 m (19 ft 8 in) SB	Emmanouil Karalis (GRE)	6.00 m (19 ft 8 in) NR
Shot Put Men	Joe Kovacs (USA)	22.14 m (72 ft 7 1/2 in)	Ryan Crouser (USA)	22.12 m (72 ft 6 3/4 in)	Leonardo Fabbri (ITA)	22.03 m (72 ft 3 1/4 in)
Rome Diamond League
30 August 2024
200 metres Women	Brittany Brown (USA)	22.00	Anavia Battle (USA)	22.27 SB	Daryll Neita (GBR)	22.46
1500 metres/Mile Women	Faith Kipyegon (KEN)	3:52.89	Freweyni Hailu (ETH)	3:54.16 PB	Birke Haylom (ETH)	3:54.79
3000 metres steeplechase Women	Winfred Yavi (BHR)	8:44.39 AR, WL, MR, PB	Peruth Chemutai (UGA)	8:48.03 NR, PB	Faith Cherotich (KEN)	8:57.65
100 metres hurdles Women	Ackera Nugent (JAM)	12.24 NR, WL, MR, PB	Masai Russell (USA)	12.31	Nadine Visser (NED)	12.52
400 metres hurdles Women	Anna Cockrell (USA)	52.59	Shiann Salmon (JAM)	53.20	Shamier Little (USA)	54.15
Pole Vault Women	Nina Kennedy (AUS)	4.83 m (15 ft 10 in)	Sandi Morris (USA)	4.83 m (15 ft 10 in)	Alysha Newman (CAN)	4.73 m (15 ft 6 in)
Long Jump Women	Tara Davis-Woodhall (USA)	7.02 m (23 ft 1/4 in)	Monae' Nichols (USA)	6.82 m (22 ft 4 1/2 in)	Quanesha Burks (USA)	6.66 m (21 ft 10 in)
100 metres Men	Letsile Tebogo (BOT)	9.87	Christian Coleman (USA)	9.92	Fred Kerley (USA)	9.95
400 metres Men	Muzala Samukonga (ZAM)	43.99	Kirani James (GRN)	44.30	Jereem Richards (TTO)	44.55
3000/5000 metres Men	Hagos Gebrhiwet (ETH)	12:51.07	Yomif Kejelcha (ETH)	12:51.25	Selemon Barega (ETH)	12:51.39 SB
High Jump Men	Woo Sanghyeok (KOR)	2.30 m (7 ft 6 1/2 in)	Romaine Beckford (JAM)	2.30 m (7 ft 6 1/2 in)	Oleh Doroshchuk (UKR)	2.27 m (7 ft 5 1/4 in)
Triple Jump Men	Andy Díaz (ITA)	17.32 m (56 ft 9 3/4 in)	Max Heß (GER)	17.01 m (55 ft 9 1/2 in)	Almir dos Santos (BRA)	16.89 m (55 ft 4 3/4 in)
Shot Put Men	Ryan Crouser (USA)	22.49 m (73 ft 9 1/4 in) MR	Leonardo Fabbri (ITA)	21.70 m (71 ft 2 1/4 in)	Payton Otterdahl (USA)	21.63 m (70 ft 11 1/2 in)
Discus Men	Kristjan Čeh (SLO)	68.61 m (225 ft 1 in)	Roje Stona (JAM)	67.85 m (222 ft 7 1/4 in)	Mykolas Alekna (LTU)	67.68 m (222 ft 1/2 in)
Zürich Diamond League
5 September 2024
100 metres Women	Sha'Carri Richardson (USA)	10.84	Julien Alfred (LCA)	10.88	Dina Asher-Smith (GBR)	10.89
800 metres Women	Mary Moraa (KEN)	1:57.08	Georgia Bell (GBR)	1:57.94	Addison Wiley (USA)	1:58.16
3000/5000 metres Women	Beatrice Chebet (KEN)	14:09.52 WL, MR	Ejgayehu Taye (ETH)	14:28.76	Tsigie Gebreselama (ETH)	14:39.05
100 metres hurdles Women	Jasmine Camacho-Quinn (PUR)	12.36	Cyréna Samba-Mayela (FRA)	12.40	Masai Russell (USA)	12.47
400 metres hurdles Women	Shiann Salmon (JAM)	52.97 PB	Anna Cockrell (USA)	53.17	Shamier Little (USA)	54.07
High Jump Women	Yaroslava Mahuchikh (UKR)	1.96 m (6 ft 5 in)	Nicola Olyslagers (AUS)	1.93 m (6 ft 3 3/4 in)	Iryna Gerashchenko (UKR)	1.93 m (6 ft 3 3/4 in)
Pole Vault Women	Nina Kennedy (AUS)	4.87 m (15 ft 11 1/2 in)	Alysha Newman (CAN)	4.82 m (15 ft 9 3/4 in)	Katie Moon (USA)	4.82 m (15 ft 9 3/4 in)
200 metres Men	Letsile Tebogo (BOT)	19.55	Kenneth Bednarek (USA)	19.57 PB	Erriyon Knighton (USA)	19.79
1500 metres/Mile Men	Yared Nuguse (USA)	3:29.21	Jakob Ingebrigtsen (NOR)	3:29.52	Cole Hocker (USA)	3:30.46
110 metres hurdles Men	Grant Holloway (USA)	12.99	Sasha Zhoya (FRA)	13.10 PB	Freddie Crittenden (USA)	13.15
400 metres hurdles Men	Roshawn Clarke (JAM)	47.49 SB	Abderrahman Samba (QAT)	47.58 SB	Rasmus Mägi (EST)	48.02
Long Jump Men	Wayne Pinnock (JAM)	8.18 m (26 ft 10 in)	Miltiadis Tentoglou (GRE)	8.02 m (26 ft 3 1/2 in)	Simon Ehammer (SUI)	7.98 m (26 ft 2 in)
Shot Put Men	Ryan Crouser (USA)	22.66 m (74 ft 4 in)	Leonardo Fabbri (ITA)	21.86 m (71 ft 8 1/2 in)	Payton Otterdahl (USA)	21.38 m (70 ft 1 1/2 in)
Javelin Men	Anderson Peters (GRN)	85.72 m (281 ft 2 3/4 in)	Julian Weber (GER)	85.33 m (279 ft 11 1/4 in)	Roderick Genki Dean (JPN)	82.69 m (271 ft 3 1/2 in)
Brussels Diamond League Final
13-14 September 2024
100 metres Women	Julien Alfred (LCA)	10.88	Dina Asher-Smith (GBR)	10.92	Marie Josée Ta Lou-Smith (CIV)	11.05
200 metres Women	Brittany Brown (USA)	22.20	Daryll Neita (GBR)	22.45	Anavia Battle (USA)	22.61
400 metres Women	Marileidy Paulino (DOM)	49.45	Alexis Holmes (USA)	50.32	Rhasidat Adeleke (IRL)	50.96
800 metres Women	Mary Moraa (KEN)	1:56.56 SB	Georgia Bell (GBR)	1:57.50	Natoya Goule-Toppin (JAM)	1:58.94
1500 metres/Mile Women	Faith Kipyegon (KEN)	3:54.75 MR	Diribe Welteji (ETH)	3:55.25	Jessica Hull (AUS)	3:56.99
3000/5000 metres Women	Beatrice Chebet (KEN)	14:09.82 MR	Medina Eisa (ETH)	14:21.89 WU20R	Fotyen Tesfay (ETH)	14:28.53 PB
100 metres hurdles Women	Jasmine Camacho-Quinn (PUR)	12.38	Nadine Visser (NED)	12.54	Ackera Nugent (JAM)	12.55
400 metres hurdles Women	Femke Bol (NED)	52.45	Anna Cockrell (USA)	53.71	Shiann Salmon (JAM)	53.99
3000 metres steeplechase Women	Faith Cherotich (KEN)	9:02.36	Winfred Yavi (BHR)	9:02.87	Peruth Chemutai (UGA)	9:07.60
High Jump Women	Yaroslava Mahuchikh (UKR)	1.97 m (6 ft 5 1/2 in)	Nicola Olyslagers (AUS)	1.97 m (6 ft 5 1/2 in)	Iryna Gerashchenko (UKR)	1.92 m (6 ft 3 1/2 in)
Pole Vault Women	Nina Kennedy (AUS)	4.88 m (16 ft 0 in)	Sandi Morris (USA)	4.80 m (15 ft 8 3/4 in)	Alysha Newman (CAN)	4.80 m (15 ft 8 3/4 in)
Long Jump Women	Larissa Iapichino (ITA)	6.80 m (22 ft 3 1/2 in)	Monae' Nichols (USA)	6.68 m (21 ft 10 3/4 in)	Jasmine Moore (USA)	6.61 m (21 ft 8 in)
Triple Jump Women	Leyanis Pérez (CUB)	14.37 m (47 ft 1 1/2 in)	Shanieka Ricketts (JAM)	14.22 m (46 ft 7 3/4 in)	Ackelia Smith (JAM)	14.11 m (46 ft 3 1/2 in)
Shot Put Women	Sarah Mitton (CAN)	20.25 m (66 ft 5 in)	Chase Jackson (USA)	19.90 m (65 ft 3 1/4 in)	Yemisi Ogunleye (GER)	19.72 m (64 ft 8 1/4 in)
Discus Women	Valarie Allman (USA)	68.47 m (224 ft 7 1/2 in) MR, SB	Bin Feng (CHN)	67.49 m (221 ft 5 in)	Yaimé Pérez (CUB)	66.96 m (219 ft 8 in) SB
Javelin Women	Haruka Kitaguchi (JPN)	66.13 m (216 ft 11 1/2 in) SB	Adriana Vilagoš (SRB)	65.23 m (214 ft 0 in)	Maggie Malone-Hardin (USA)	62.40 m (204 ft 8 1/2 in)
100 metres Men	Ackeem Blake (JAM)	9.93	Christian Coleman (USA)	10.00	Fred Kerley (USA)	10.01
200 metres Men	Kenny Bednarek (USA)	19.67	Letsile Tebogo (BOT)	19.80	Alexander Ogando (DOM)	19.97
400 metres Men	Charlie Dobson (GBR)	44.49	Kirani James (GRN)	44.63	Muzala Samukonga (ZAM)	44.69
800 metres Men	Emmanuel Wanyonyi (KEN)	1:42.70	Djamel Sedjati (ALG)	1:42.86	Marco Arop (CAN)	1:43.25
1500 metres/Mile Men	Jakob Ingebrigtsen (NOR)	3:30.37	Timothy Cheruiyot (KEN)	3:30.93	Cole Hocker (USA)	3:30.94
3000/5000 metres Men	Berihu Aregawi (ETH)	12:43.66 SB	Hagos Gebrhiwet (ETH)	12:44.25	Telahun Haile Bekele (ETH)	12:45.63 SB
110 metres hurdles Men	Sasha Zhoya (FRA)	13.16	Lorenzo Simonelli (ITA)	13.22	Freddie Crittenden (USA)	13.24
400 metres hurdles Men	Alison dos Santos (BRA)	47.93	Abderrahman Samba (QAT)	48.20	Rasmus Mägi (EST)	48.26
3000 metres steeplechase Men	Amos Serem (KEN)	8:06.90	Soufiane El Bakkali (MAR)	8:08.60	Mohamed Amin Jhinaoui (TUN)	8:09.68
High Jump Men	Gianmarco Tamberi (ITA)	2.34 m (7 ft 8 in)	Oleh Doroshchuk (UKR)	2.31 m (7 ft 6 3/4 in) =PB	Woo Sanghyeok (KOR)	2.25 m (7 ft 4 1/2 in)
Pole Vault Men	Armand Duplantis (SWE)	6.11 m (20 ft 1/2 in) MR	Emmanouil Karalis (GRE)	5.82 m (19 ft 1 in)	Ben Broeders (BEL)	5.82 m (19 ft 1 in) =SB
Long Jump Men	Tajay Gayle (JAM)	8.28 m (27 ft 1 3/4 in) SB	Simon Ehammer (SUI)	8.16 m (26 ft 9 1/4 in)	Miltiadis Tentoglou (GRE)	8.15 m (26 ft 8 3/4 in)
Triple Jump Men	Pedro Pichardo (POR)	17.33 m (56 ft 10 1/4 in)	Max Heß (GER)	17.20 m (56 ft 5 in)	Hugues Fabrice Zango (BFA)	17.05 m (55 ft 11 1/4 in)
Shot Put Men	Leonardo Fabbri (ITA)	22.98 m (75 ft 4 1/2 in) MR, NR, PB	Ryan Crouser (USA)	22.79 m (74 ft 9 in)	Rajindra Campbell (JAM)	21.95 m (72 ft 0 in)
Discus Men	Matthew Denny (AUS)	69.96 m (229 ft 6 1/4 in) MR, NR, PB	Mykolas Alekna (LTU)	68.86 m (225 ft 11 in)	Lukas Weißhaidinger (AUT)	66.52 m (218 ft 2 3/4 in)
Javelin Men	Anderson Peters (GRN)	87.87 m (288 ft 3 1/4 in)	Neeraj Chopra (IND)	87.86 m (288 ft 3 in)	Julian Weber (GER)	85.97 m (282 ft 1/2 in)
