= 2024 Athletissima =

Diamond League athletics meeting

- Dates: 22 August 2024
- Host city: Lausanne, Switzerland
- Venue: Stade Olympique de la Pontaise
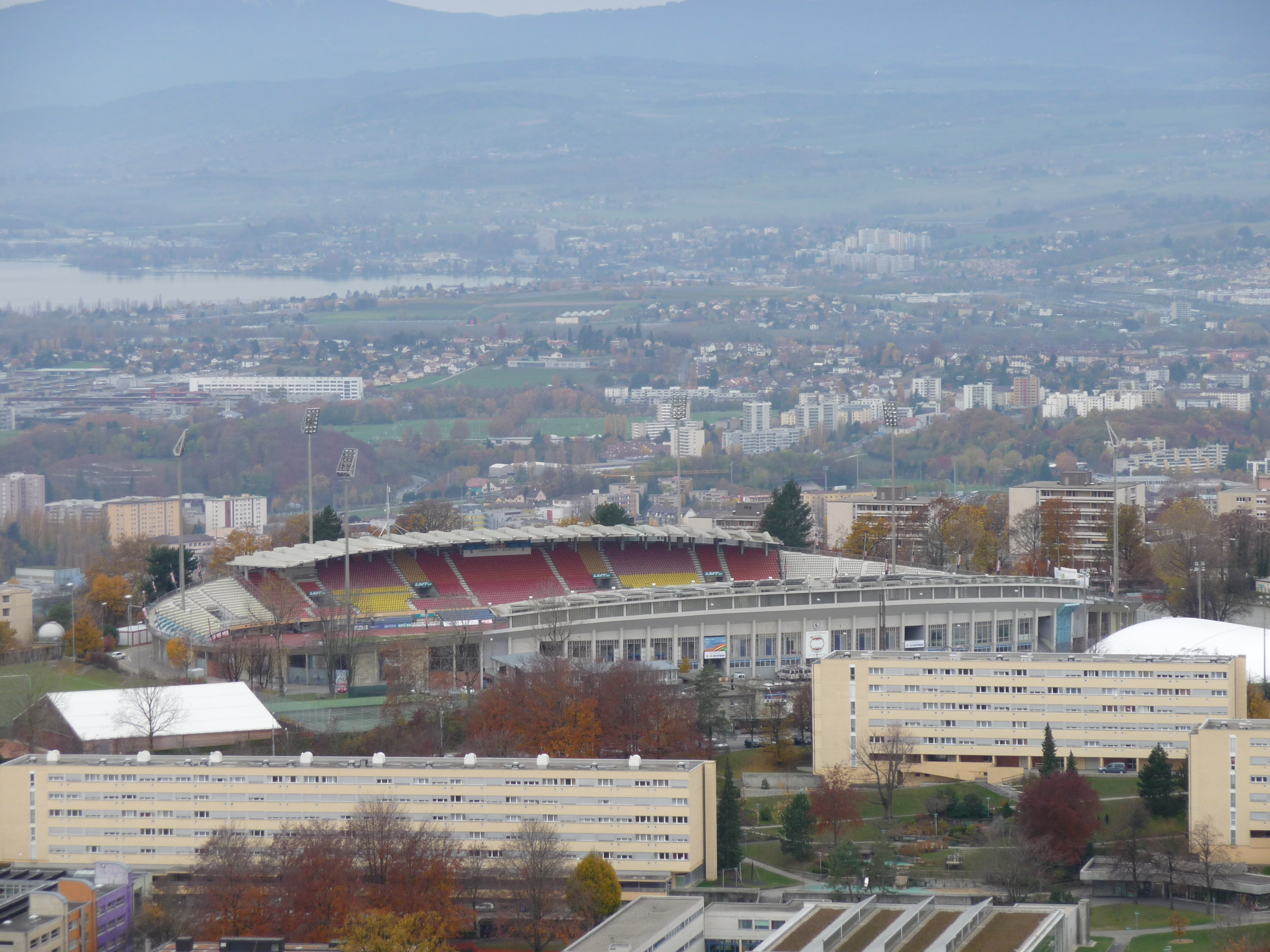
- Level: 2024 Diamond League

The 2024 Athletissima was the 48th edition of the annual outdoor athletics meeting in Lausanne, Switzerland. Held on 22 August at the Stade Olympique de la Pontaise, it was the 11th leg of the 2024 Diamond League – the highest level international track and field circuit. The men's pole vault competition was held one day earlier on 21 August.

== Highlights ==
At the meeting, Jakob Ingebrigtsen, who held the fastest time of the year in the men's 1500 m but did not earn a medal in that event at the Paris Olympics, defeated Olympic gold medallist Cole Hocker to set a meeting record of 3:27.83. Emmanuel Wanyonyi also set a new world lead and Diamond League record in the 800 m, running 1:41.11.

== Results ==
Athletes competing in the Diamond League disciplines earned extra compensation and points which went towards qualifying for the 2024 Diamond League finals. First place earned 8 points, with each step down in place earning one less point than the previous, until no points are awarded in 9th place or lower. In the case of a tie, each tying athlete earns the full amount of points for the place.

=== Diamond Discipline ===
Men's Pole Vault
Place	Athlete	Age	Country	Mark	Points
1st place, gold medalist(s)	Armand Duplantis	24	Sweden	6.15 m	8
2nd place, silver medalist(s)	Sam Kendricks	31	United States	5.92 m	7
3rd place, bronze medalist(s)	Kurtis Marschall	27	Australia	5.82 m	6
3rd place, bronze medalist(s)	EJ Obiena	28	Philippines	5.82 m	6
3rd place, bronze medalist(s)	Sondre Guttormsen	25	Norway	5.82 m	6
6	Emmanouil Karalis	24	Greece	5.82 m	3
7	Thibaut Collet	25	France	5.72 m	2
8	Renaud Lavillenie	37	France	5.72 m	1
9	Jacob Wooten	27	United States	5.62 m	
10	Chris Nilsen	26	United States	5.52 m	
11	Valentin Imsand	19	Switzerland	5.35 m	

Men's 200 Metres (+0.9 m/s)
Place	Athlete	Age	Country	Time	Points
1st place, gold medalist(s)	Letsile Tebogo	21	Botswana	19.64	8
2nd place, silver medalist(s)	Erriyon Knighton	20	United States	19.78	7
3rd place, bronze medalist(s)	Fred Kerley	29	United States	19.86	6
4	Alexander Ogando	24	Dominican Republic	19.94	5
5	Jereem Richards	30	Trinidad and Tobago	20.10	4
6	Joseph Fahnbulleh	22	Liberia	20.18	3
7	Timothé Mumenthaler	21	Switzerland	20.54	2
8	William Reais	25	Switzerland	20.75	1

Men's 400 Metres
Place	Athlete	Age	Country	Time	Points
1st place, gold medalist(s)	Matthew Hudson-Smith	29	Great Britain	43.96	8
2nd place, silver medalist(s)	Muzala Samukonga	21	Zambia	44.06	7
3rd place, bronze medalist(s)	Busang Kebinatshipi	20	Botswana	44.22	6
4	Bryce Deadmon	27	United States	44.37	5
5	Charlie Dobson	24	Great Britain	44.53	4
6	Vernon Norwood	32	United States	44.55	3
7	Lionel Spitz	23	Switzerland	45.82	2
8	Eugene Omalla	23	Netherlands	46.06	1

Men's 1500 Metres
Place	Athlete	Age	Country	Time	Points
1st place, gold medalist(s)	Jakob Ingebrigtsen	23	Norway	3:27.83	8
2nd place, silver medalist(s)	Cole Hocker	23	United States	3:29.85	7
3rd place, bronze medalist(s)	Hobbs Kessler	21	United States	3:30.47	6
4	Reynold Cheruiyot	20	Kenya	3:30.88	5
5	Brian Komen	26	Kenya	3:31.41	4
6	Jochem Vermeulen	26	Belgium	3:31.74	3
7	Azeddine Habz	31	France	3:31.89	2
8	Stefan Nillessen	21	Netherlands	3:32.16	1
9	Isaac Nader	25	Portugal	3:32.49	
10	Dominic Lokinyomo Lobalu	26	Switzerland	3:34.39	
11	Stewart McSweyn	29	Australia	3:34.80	
12	Olli Hoare	27	Australia	3:36.03	
13	George Mills	25	Great Britain	3:36.80	
	Luke McCann	26	Ireland	DNF	
	Žan Rudolf	31	Slovenia	DNF	

Men's 110 Metres Hurdles (−0.1 m/s)
Place	Athlete	Age	Country	Time	Points
1st place, gold medalist(s)	Rasheed Broadbell	24	Jamaica	13.10	8
2nd place, silver medalist(s)	Grant Holloway	26	United States	13.14	7
3rd place, bronze medalist(s)	Hansle Parchment	34	Jamaica	13.23	6
4	Daniel Roberts	26	United States	13.26	5
5	Lorenzo Simonelli	22	Italy	13.26	4
6	Cordell Tinch	24	United States	13.34	3
7	Sasha Zhoya	22	France	13.37	2
8	Jason Joseph	25	Switzerland	13.78	1

Men's Long Jump
Place	Athlete	Age	Country	Mark	Points
1st place, gold medalist(s)	Miltiadis Tentoglou	26	Greece	8.06 m (+0.7 m/s)	8
2nd place, silver medalist(s)	Wayne Pinnock	23	Jamaica	8.01 m (−0.2 m/s)	7
3rd place, bronze medalist(s)	Simon Ehammer	24	Switzerland	7.99 m (−0.9 m/s)	6
4	Tajay Gayle	28	Jamaica	7.92 m (−0.2 m/s)	5
5	Filip Pravdica	29	Croatia	7.89 m (−0.4 m/s)	4
6	Mattia Furlani	19	Italy	7.88 m (−0.2 m/s)	3
7	Carey McLeod	26	Jamaica	7.82 m (−0.4 m/s)	2
8	Jeremiah Davis	22	United States	7.80 m (−0.6 m/s)	1
9	Jarrion Lawson	30	United States	7.69 m (−0.8 m/s)	
10	Anvar Anvarov	23	Uzbekistan	7.64 m (−0.7 m/s)	

Men's Javelin Throw
Place	Athlete	Age	Country	Mark	Points
1st place, gold medalist(s)	Anderson Peters	26	Grenada	90.61 m	8
2nd place, silver medalist(s)	Neeraj Chopra	26	India	89.49 m	7
3rd place, bronze medalist(s)	Julian Weber	29	Germany	87.08 m	6
4	Artur Felfner	20	Ukraine	83.38 m	5
5	Genki Dean	32	Japan	83.19 m	4
6	Julius Yego	35	Kenya	83.00 m	3
7	Jakub Vadlejch	33	Czech Republic	82.03 m	2
8	Andrian Mardare	29	Moldova	81.44 m	1
9	Lassi Etelätalo	36	Finland	73.68 m	
10	Edis Matusevičius	28	Lithuania	73.20 m	

Women's 100 Metres (−0.4 m/s)
Place	Athlete	Age	Country	Time	Points
1st place, gold medalist(s)	Dina Asher-Smith	28	Great Britain	10.88	8
2nd place, silver medalist(s)	Tamari Davis	21	United States	10.97	7
3rd place, bronze medalist(s)	Mujinga Kambundji	32	Switzerland	11.06	6
4	Marie Josée Ta Lou-Smith	35	Ivory Coast	11.07	5
5	Tia Clayton	20	Jamaica	11.10	4
6	Gina Lückenkemper	27	Germany	11.19	3
7	Daryll Neita	27	Great Britain	11.20	2
8	Patrizia van der Weken	24	Luxembourg	11.24	1

Women's 800 Metres
Place	Athlete	Age	Country	Time	Points
1st place, gold medalist(s)	Mary Moraa	24	Kenya	1:57.91	8
2nd place, silver medalist(s)	Georgia Bell	30	Great Britain	1:58.53	7
3rd place, bronze medalist(s)	Jemma Reekie	26	Great Britain	1:58.73	6
4	Halimah Nakaayi	29	Uganda	1:58.90	5
5	Rénelle Lamote	30	France	1:59.13	4
6	Shafiqua Maloney	25	Saint Vincent and the Grenadines	1:59.28	3
7	Audrey Werro	20	Switzerland	1:59.31	2
8	Natoya Goule	33	Jamaica	1:59.68	1
9	Rachel Pellaud	29	Switzerland	1:59.89	
10	Nia Akins	26	United States	2:00.00	
11	Allie Wilson	28	United States	2:00.35	
	Aneta Lemiesz	43	Poland	DNF	

Women's 3000 Metres
Place	Athlete	Age	Country	Time	Points
1st place, gold medalist(s)	Diribe Welteji	22	Ethiopia	8:21.50	8
2nd place, silver medalist(s)	Janeth Chepngetich	26	Kenya	8:23.48	7
3rd place, bronze medalist(s)	Tsigie Gebreselama	23	Ethiopia	8:24.40	6
4	Elise Cranny	28	United States	8:25.10	5
5	Georgia Griffith	27	Australia	8:31.91	4
6	Nathalie Blomqvist	23	Finland	8:32.33	3
7	Karissa Schweizer	28	United States	8:34.96	2
8	Hirut Meshesha	23	Ethiopia	8:42.92	1
9	Margaret Akidor	22	Kenya	8:43.81	
10	Joselyn Brea	30	Venezuela	8:43.99	
11	Revée Walcott-Nolan	29	Great Britain	8:44.26	
12	Aynadis Mebratu	19	Ethiopia	8:52.98	
	Sarah Billings	26	Australia	DNF	
	Marta García	26	Spain	DNF	
	Dani Jones	28	United States	DNF	

Women's 100 Metres Hurdles (−0.9 m/s)
Place	Athlete	Age	Country	Time	Points
1st place, gold medalist(s)	Jasmine Camacho-Quinn	28	Puerto Rico	12.35	8
2nd place, silver medalist(s)	Grace Stark	23	United States	12.38	7
3rd place, bronze medalist(s)	Ackera Nugent	22	Jamaica	12.38	6
4	Nadine Visser	29	Netherlands	12.49	5
5	Danielle Williams	31	Jamaica	12.53	4
6	Alaysha Johnson	28	United States	12.59	3
7	Cyréna Samba-Mayela	23	France	12.69	2
8	Ditaji Kambundji	22	Switzerland	12.75	1

Women's 400 Metres Hurdles
Place	Athlete	Age	Country	Time	Points
1st place, gold medalist(s)	Femke Bol	24	Netherlands	52.25	8
2nd place, silver medalist(s)	Rushell Clayton	31	Jamaica	53.32	7
3rd place, bronze medalist(s)	Janieve Russell	30	Jamaica	54.48	6
4	Andrenette Knight	27	Jamaica	54.93	5
5	Ayomide Folorunso	27	Italy	55.08	4
6	Paulien Couckuyt	27	Belgium	55.53	3
7	Cathelijn Peeters	27	Netherlands	56.28	2
8	Shamier Little	29	United States	58.57	1

Women's High Jump
Place	Athlete	Age	Country	Mark	Points
1st place, gold medalist(s)	Yaroslava Mahuchikh	22	Ukraine	1.99 m	8
2nd place, silver medalist(s)	Eleanor Patterson	28	Australia	1.96 m	7
3rd place, bronze medalist(s)	Nicola Olyslagers	27	Australia	1.92 m	6
4	Christina Honsel	27	Germany	1.92 m	5
5	Safina Sadullayeva	26	Uzbekistan	1.88 m	4
5	Iryna Herashchenko	29	Ukraine	1.88 m	4
7	Lamara Distin	24	Jamaica	1.88 m	2
8	Lia Apostolovski	24	Slovenia	1.88 m	1
9	Nawal Meniker	26	France	1.88 m	
10	Ella Junnila	25	Finland	1.84 m	
11	Marithé Engondo	22	Switzerland	1.84 m	

Women's Shot Put
Place	Athlete	Age	Country	Mark	Points
1st place, gold medalist(s)	Chase Jackson	30	United States	20.64 m	8
2nd place, silver medalist(s)	Yemisi Ogunleye	25	Germany	19.55 m	7
3rd place, bronze medalist(s)	Sarah Mitton	28	Canada	19.52 m	6
4	Raven Saunders	28	United States	19.08 m	5
5	Danniel Thomas-Dodd	31	Jamaica	18.78 m	4
6	Maddi Wesche	25	New Zealand	18.66 m	3
7	Maggie Ewen	29	United States	18.60 m	2
8	Alina Kenzel	27	Germany	17.95 m	1
9	Adelaide Aquilla	25	United States	17.62 m	
10	Jessica Schilder	25	Netherlands	17.22 m	
11	Miryam Mazenauer	24	Switzerland	15.64 m	

=== Promotional events ===
Men's 800 Metres
Place	Athlete	Age	Country	Time
1st place, gold medalist(s)	Emmanuel Wanyonyi	20	Kenya	1:41.11
2nd place, silver medalist(s)	Marco Arop	25	Canada	1:41.72
3rd place, bronze medalist(s)	Gabriel Tual	26	France	1:42.30
4	Bryce Hoppel	26	United States	1:42.63
5	Pieter Sisk	24	Belgium	1:43.48
6	Catalin Tecuceanu	24	Italy	1:44.07
7	Elliot Giles	30	Great Britain	1:44.32
8	Mohamed Attaoui	22	Spain	1:45.40
	Ludovic Le Meur	26	France	DNF

Women's 4x100 Metres Relay
Place	Athlete	Age	Country	Time
1st place, gold medalist(s)	Dina Asher-Smith; Desirèe Henry; Bianca Williams; Amy Hunt		Great Britain	42.03
2nd place, silver medalist(s)	Salomé Kora; Sarah Atcho-Jaquier; Léonie Pointet; Mujinga Kambundji		Switzerland	42.16
3rd place, bronze medalist(s)	Nadine Visser; Marije van Hunenstijn; Minke Bisschops; Tasa Jiya		Netherlands	42.83
4	Soraya Becerra; Fabienne Hoenke; Iris Caligiuri; Emma van Camp		Switzerland	44.04
5	Patricia Brunninger; Magdalena Lindner; Isabel Posch; Viktoria Willhuber		Austria	44.76
6	Lorène Bazolo; Lurdes Oliveira; Olimpia Barbosa; Patrícia Rodrigues		Portugal	45.75

=== National events ===
Men's 400 Metres
Place	Athlete	Age	Country	Time
1st place, gold medalist(s)	Ricky Petrucciani	24	Switzerland	45.83
2nd place, silver medalist(s)	Charles Devantay	26	Switzerland	46.06
3rd place, bronze medalist(s)	Nathan Gyger	32	Switzerland	47.34
4	Michael Sorg	20	Switzerland	48.14
5	Nahom Yirga	22	Switzerland	48.24
6	Juri Jutzet	18–19	Switzerland	49.17
7	Samuel Coquoz	28	Switzerland	49.42
8	Pierre-Yves Bregenzer	23	Switzerland	49.60

Men's 1500 Metres
Place	Athlete	Age	Country	Time
1st place, gold medalist(s)	Elliot Vermeulen	17–18	Belgium	3:46.56
2nd place, silver medalist(s)	Wondimu Bussy	28–29	Switzerland	3:46.84
3rd place, bronze medalist(s)	Julien Stalhandske	24	Switzerland	3:48.07
4	Paul McIntyre	24	Switzerland	3:48.71
5	Diego Klopfenstein	27	Switzerland	3:48.99
6	Arnaud Monney	21–22	Switzerland	3:49.54
7	Léo Lädermann	22	Switzerland	3:49.55
8	Tobias Bontorno	21	Switzerland	3:50.20
9	Aidan Tooker	26	United States	3:50.24
10	Thomas Gmür	30	Switzerland	3:51.21
11	Anton Broggini	17–18	Switzerland	3:58.04
12	Andy Coendet	29–30	Switzerland	3:59.24
13	Jonathan Ruchti	20	Switzerland	4:02.19
	Michael Curti	30	Switzerland	DNF

Women's 100 Metres
Place	Athlete	Age	Country	Time	Heat
1st place, gold medalist(s)	Minke Bisschops	21	Netherlands	11.47	1
2nd place, silver medalist(s)	Isabel Posch	24	Austria	11.50	1
3rd place, bronze medalist(s)	Céline Bürgi	24	Switzerland	11.51	1
4	Isabel van den Berg	19	Netherlands	11.64	1
5	Iris Caligiuri	21	Switzerland	11.65	1
6	Soraya Becerra	20	Switzerland	11.73	1
7	Anouk Ledermann	19	Switzerland	11.98	1
8	Selina Furler	21	Switzerland	12.02	1
1st place, gold medalist(s)	Jenna Prandini	31	United States	11.24	2
2nd place, silver medalist(s)	Boglárka Takács	22	Hungary	11.35	2
3rd place, bronze medalist(s)	Amy Hunt	22	Great Britain	11.36	2
4	Salomé Kora	30	Switzerland	11.41	2
5	Lorène Bazolo	41	Portugal	11.42	2
6	Bianca Williams	30	Great Britain	11.45	2
7	Desirèe Henry	28	Great Britain	11.53	2
8	Emma van Camp	19	Switzerland	11.62	2

Women's 200 Metres (+0.5 m/s)
Place	Athlete	Age	Country	Time
1st place, gold medalist(s)	Boglárka Takács	22	Hungary	22.76
2nd place, silver medalist(s)	Jessica-Bianca Wessolly	27	Germany	22.83
3rd place, bronze medalist(s)	Tasa Jiya	26	Netherlands	22.93
4	Marije van Hunenstijn	29	Netherlands	23.02
5	Léonie Pointet	23	Switzerland	23.02
6	Sarah Atcho-Jaquier	29	Switzerland	23.26
7	Finette Agyapong	27	Great Britain	23.38
8	Fabienne Hoenke	20	Switzerland	23.70

Women's 400 Metres
Place	Athlete	Age	Country	Time
1st place, gold medalist(s)	Catia Gubelmann	22	Switzerland	52.57
2nd place, silver medalist(s)	Lena Wernli	23	Switzerland	53.33
3rd place, bronze medalist(s)	Annina Fahr	31	Switzerland	53.49
4	Karin Disch	27	Switzerland	54.03
5	Michelle Gröbli	23	Switzerland	54.58
6	Aline Yuille	21	Switzerland	54.87
7	Shoelle Bruhin	24	Switzerland	54.97
8	Sophie Martin	24	Switzerland	55.66

Women's 800 Metres
Place	Athlete	Age	Country	Time
1st place, gold medalist(s)	Lorea Ibarzabal	29	Spain	2:01.31
2nd place, silver medalist(s)	Lore Hoffmann	28	Switzerland	2:01.69
3rd place, bronze medalist(s)	Agnès Raharolahy	31	France	2:02.39
4	Joceline Wind	23	Switzerland	2:03.76
5	Maria Freij	25	Sweden	2:04.24
6	Fiona von Flüe	16	Switzerland	2:05.76
7	Melina Andorra	22	Switzerland	2:07.68
8	Juliette Dutruy	21	Switzerland	2:10.03
9	Anna Peter	29	Switzerland	2:11.82
10	Vanessa Feierabend	15–16	Switzerland	2:15.01
	Veera PeräLä	24	Finland	DNF

=== U18 events ===
Women's 1000 Metres
Place	Athlete	Age	Country	Time
1st place, gold medalist(s)	Aimie Decrausaz	13–14	Switzerland	2:49.30
2nd place, silver medalist(s)	Agathe Pittet	16	Switzerland	2:58.00
3rd place, bronze medalist(s)	Mia Heldner	13–14	Switzerland	2:58.03
4	Timea Kouyoumdjian	14–15	Switzerland	3:01.48
