= 2024 Weltklasse Zürich =

- Dates: 5 September 2024
- Host city: Zürich
- Venue: Letzigrund
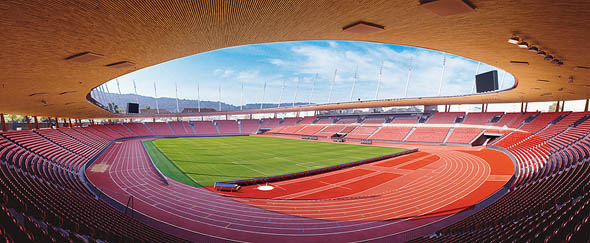
- Level: 2024 Diamond League

The 2024 Weltklasse Zürich was the 63rd edition of the annual outdoor track and field meeting held in Zürich. Held on 5 September at Letzigrund, it was the twelfth leg of the 2024 Diamond League – the highest level international track and field circuit.

== Notable performances ==
The meeting was highlighted by a world record attempt in the women's 5000 metres by Beatrice Chebet, and an "Olympic rematch" in the men's 1500 metres between Cole Hocker, Josh Kerr, Yared Nuguse, and Jakob Ingebrigtsen. However, poor weather conditions and suboptimal pacemaking led to Chebet's world record attempt falling short, though she still won in a world lead and meeting record of 14:09.52, which came within 10 seconds of Gudaf Tsegay's world record of 14:00.21. Meanwhile, Nuguse won the 1500 m over Ingebrigtsen, Hocker, and Kerr in a time of 3:29.21.

== Results ==
Athletes competing in the Diamond League disciplines earned extra compensation and points which went towards qualifying for the 2024 Diamond League finals. First place earned 8 points, with each step down in place earning one less point than the previous, until no points are awarded in 9th place or lower. In the case of a tie, each tying athlete earns the full amount of points for the place.

=== Diamond Discipline ===
Men's 200 Metres (+0.4 m/s)
Place	Athlete	Country	Time	Points
1st place, gold medalist(s)	Letsile Tebogo	Botswana	19.55	8
2nd place, silver medalist(s)	Kenneth Bednarek	United States	19.79	7
3rd place, bronze medalist(s)	Erriyon Knighton	United States	19.79	6
4	Fred Kerley	United States	19.81	5
5	Alexander Ogando	Dominican Republic	19.87	4
6	Courtney Lindsey	United States	20.17	3
7	Joseph Fahnbulleh	Liberia	20.52	2
8	Timothé Mumenthaler	Switzerland	20.72	1

Men's 1500 Metres
Place	Athlete	Country	Time	Points
1st place, gold medalist(s)	Yared Nuguse	United States	3:29.21	8
2nd place, silver medalist(s)	Jakob Ingebrigtsen	Norway	3:29.52	7
3rd place, bronze medalist(s)	Cole Hocker	United States	3:30.46	6
4	Niels Laros	Netherlands	3:31.23	5
5	Josh Kerr	Great Britain	3:31.46	4
6	Reynold Cheruiyot	Kenya	3:32.15	3
7	Azeddine Habz	France	3:32.39	2
8	Robert Farken	Germany	3:32.39	1
9	Jochem Vermeulen	Belgium	3:32.39	
10	Stefan Nillessen	Netherlands	3:32.39	
11	Timothy Cheruiyot	Kenya	3:32.39	
12	Narve Gilje Nordås	Norway	3:34.31	
13	Olli Hoare	Australia	3:37.43	
14	Boaz Kiprugut	Kenya	3:41.59	
—	Elliot Giles	Great Britain	DNF	
—	Žan Rudolf	Slovenia	DNF	

Men's 110m hurdles (−0.3 m/s)
Place	Athlete	Country	Time	Points
1st place, gold medalist(s)	Grant Holloway	United States	12.99	8
2nd place, silver medalist(s)	Sasha Zhoya	France	13.10	7
3rd place, bronze medalist(s)	Freddie Crittenden	United States	13.15	6
4	Hansle Parchment	Jamaica	13.18	5
5	Daniel Roberts	Australia	13.18	4
6	Rachid Muratake	Japan	13.20	3
7	Cordell Tinch	United States	13.31	2
8	Lorenzo Simonelli	Italy	13.45	1
9	Jason Joseph	Switzerland	13.60	

Men's 400 Metres Hurdles
Place	Athlete	Country	Time	Points
1st place, gold medalist(s)	Roshawn Clarke	Jamaica	47.49	8
2nd place, silver medalist(s)	Abderrahman Samba	Qatar	47.58	7
3rd place, bronze medalist(s)	Rasmus Mägi	Estonia	48.02	6
4	Clément Ducos	France	48.02	5
5	CJ Allen	United States	48.20	4
6	Gerald Drummond	Costa Rica	49.59	3
7	Julien Bonvin	Switzerland	50.04	2
—	Alison dos Santos	Brazil	DNF	

Men's Long Jump
Place	Athlete	Country	Mark	Points
1st place, gold medalist(s)	Wayne Pinnock	Jamaica	8.18 m (−0.9 m/s)	8
2nd place, silver medalist(s)	Miltiadis Tentoglou	Greece	8.02 m (−1.2 m/s)	7
3rd place, bronze medalist(s)	Simon Ehammer	Switzerland	7.98 m (+0.2 m/s)	6
4	Jacob Fincham-Dukes	Great Britain	7.92 m (−1.0 m/s)	5
5	Mattia Furlani	Italy	7.91 m (−0.3 m/s)	4
6	Tajay Gayle	Jamaica	7.85 m (−2.0 m/s)	3
7	Marquis Dendy	United States	7.79 m (+0.7 m/s)	2
8	Markus Rooth	Norway	7.69 m (−1.0 m/s)	1
9	Radek Juška	Czech Republic	7.35 m (−1.2 m/s)	
—	Carey McLeod	Jamaica	DNS	

Men's Shot Put
Place	Athlete	Country	Mark	Points
1st place, gold medalist(s)	Ryan Crouser	United States	22.66 m	8
2nd place, silver medalist(s)	Leonardo Fabbri	Italy	21.86 m	7
3rd place, bronze medalist(s)	Payton Otterdahl	United States	21.38 m	6
4	Joe Kovacs	United States	20.90 m	5
5	Scott Lincoln	Great Britain	20.82 m	4
6	Chukwuebuka Enekwechi	Nigeria	20.52 m	3
7	Roger Steen	United States	20.44 m	2
8	Rajindra Campbell	Jamaica	20.19 m	1
9	Tomáš Staněk	Czech Republic	20.08 m	
10	Zane Weir	Italy	18.98 m	

Men's Javelin Throw
Place	Athlete	Country	Mark	Points
1st place, gold medalist(s)	Anderson Peters	Grenada	85.72 m	8
2nd place, silver medalist(s)	Julian Weber	Germany	85.33 m	7
3rd place, bronze medalist(s)	Roderick Genki Dean	Japan	82.69 m	6
4	Andrian Mardare	Moldova	80.47 m	5
5	Lassi Etelätalo	Finland	77.85 m	4
6	Gatis Čakšs	Latvia	76.11 m	3
7	Artur Felfner	Ukraine	75.89 m	2
8	Edis Matusevičius	Lithuania	73.74 m	1
9	Simon Wieland	Switzerland	72.06 m	
10	Julius Yego	Kenya	69.61 m	

Women's 100 Metres (+0.1 m/s)
Place	Athlete	Country	Time	Points
1st place, gold medalist(s)	Sha'Carri Richardson	United States	10.84	8
2nd place, silver medalist(s)	Julien Alfred	Saint Lucia	10.88	7
3rd place, bronze medalist(s)	Dina Asher-Smith	Great Britain	10.89	6
4	Marie-Josée Ta Lou	Ivory Coast	10.93	5
5	Tamari Davis	United States	11.06	4
6	Tia Clayton	Jamaica	11.09	3
7	Daryll Neita	Great Britain	11.11	2
8	Mujinga Kambundji	Switzerland	11.14	1
9	Gina Mariam Bass Bittaye	Gambia	11.17	

Women's 800 Metres
Place	Athlete	Country	Time	Points
1st place, gold medalist(s)	Mary Moraa	Kenya	1:57.08	8
2nd place, silver medalist(s)	Georgia Bell	Great Britain	1:57.94	7
3rd place, bronze medalist(s)	Addison Wiley	United States	1:58.16	6
4	Jemma Reekie	Great Britain	1:58.49	5
5	Rénelle Lamote	France	1:58.82	4
6	Prudence Sekgodiso	South Africa	1:58.90	3
7	Shafiqua Maloney	Saint Vincent and the Grenadines	1:59.06	2
8	Nia Akins	United States	1:59.85	1
9	Rachel Pellaud	Switzerland	1:59.85	
10	Gabriela Gajanová	Slovakia	2:00.11	
11	Valentina Rosamilia	Switzerland	2:00.17	
12	Audrey Werro	Switzerland	2:06.17	
—	Angelika Sarna	Poland	DNF	

Women's 5000 Metres
Place	Athlete	Country	Time	Points
1st place, gold medalist(s)	Beatrice Chebet	Kenya	14:09.52	8
2nd place, silver medalist(s)	Ejgayehu Taye	Ethiopia	14:28.76	7
3rd place, bronze medalist(s)	Tsigie Gebreselama	Ethiopia	14:39.05	6
4	Karissa Schweizer	United States	14:47.50	5
5	Melknat Wudu	Ethiopia	14:47.52	4
6	Fotyen Tesfay	Ethiopia	14:47.53	3
7	Nozomi Tanaka	Japan	14:49.95	2
8	Elise Cranny	United States	14:54.33	1
9	Whittni Morgan	United States	14:54.89	
10	Margaret Akidor	Kenya	14:55.67	
11	Francine Niyomukunzi	Burundi	15:07.13	
12	Gela Hambese	Ethiopia	15:35.86	
—	Georgia Griffith	Australia	DNF	
—	Karoline Bjerkeli Grøvdal	Norway	DNF	
—	Katie Snowden	Great Britain	DNF	

Women's 100m hurdles (+0.8 m/s)
Place	Athlete	Country	Time	Points
1st place, gold medalist(s)	Jasmine Camacho-Quinn	Puerto Rico	12.36	8
2nd place, silver medalist(s)	Cyréna Samba-Mayela	France	12.40	7
3rd place, bronze medalist(s)	Masai Russell	United States	12.47	6
4	Grace Stark	United States	12.49	5
5	Nadine Visser	Netherlands	12.54	4
6	Danielle Williams	Jamaica	12.57	3
7	Kendra Harrison	United States	12.57	2
8	Pia Skrzyszowska	Poland	12.90	1
—	Ditaji Kambundji	Switzerland	DQ	

Women's 400m hurdles
Place	Athlete	Country	Time	Points
1st place, gold medalist(s)	Shiann Salmon	Jamaica	52.97	8
2nd place, silver medalist(s)	Anna Cockrell	United States	53.17	7
3rd place, bronze medalist(s)	Shamier Little	United States	54.07	6
4	Janieve Russell	Jamaica	54.75	5
5	Ayomide Folorunso	Italy	55.26	4
6	Andrenette Knight	Jamaica	55.42	3
7	Louise Maraval	France	55.54	2
8	Yasmin Giger	Switzerland	56.19	1

Women's High Jump
Place	Athlete	Country	Mark	Points
1st place, gold medalist(s)	Yaroslava Mahuchikh	Ukraine	1.96 m	8
2nd place, silver medalist(s)	Nicola Olyslagers	Australia	1.93 m	7
3rd place, bronze medalist(s)	Iryna Herashchenko	Ukraine	1.93 m	6
4	Safina Sadullayeva	Uzbekistan	1.89 m	5
5	Eleanor Patterson	Australia	1.89 m	4
6	Lia Apostolovski	Slovenia	1.89 m	3
7	Christina Honsel	Germany	1.85 m	2
8	Lamara Distin	Jamaica	1.85 m	1
—	Salome Lang	Switzerland	NM	
—	Nawal Meniker	France	NM	

Women's Pole Vault
Place	Athlete	Country	Mark	Points
1st place, gold medalist(s)	Nina Kennedy	Australia	4.87 m	8
2nd place, silver medalist(s)	Alysha Newman	Canada	4.82 m	7
3rd place, bronze medalist(s)	Katie Moon	United States	4.82 m	6
4	Angelica Moser	Switzerland	4.77 m	5
5	Sandi Morris	United States	4.67 m	4
6	Pascale Stöcklin	Switzerland	4.52 m	3
7	Amálie Švábíková	Czech Republic	4.52 m	2
8	Katerina Stefanidi	Greece	4.52 m	1
9	Roberta Bruni	Italy	4.52 m	
10	Eliza McCartney	New Zealand	4.37 m	

== See also ==
- 2024 Diamond League
