= 2024 Shanghai Diamond League =

2024 Diamond League Shanghai
- Dates: 27 April 2024
- Host city: Suzhou, China
- Venue: Suzhou Olympic Sports Centre
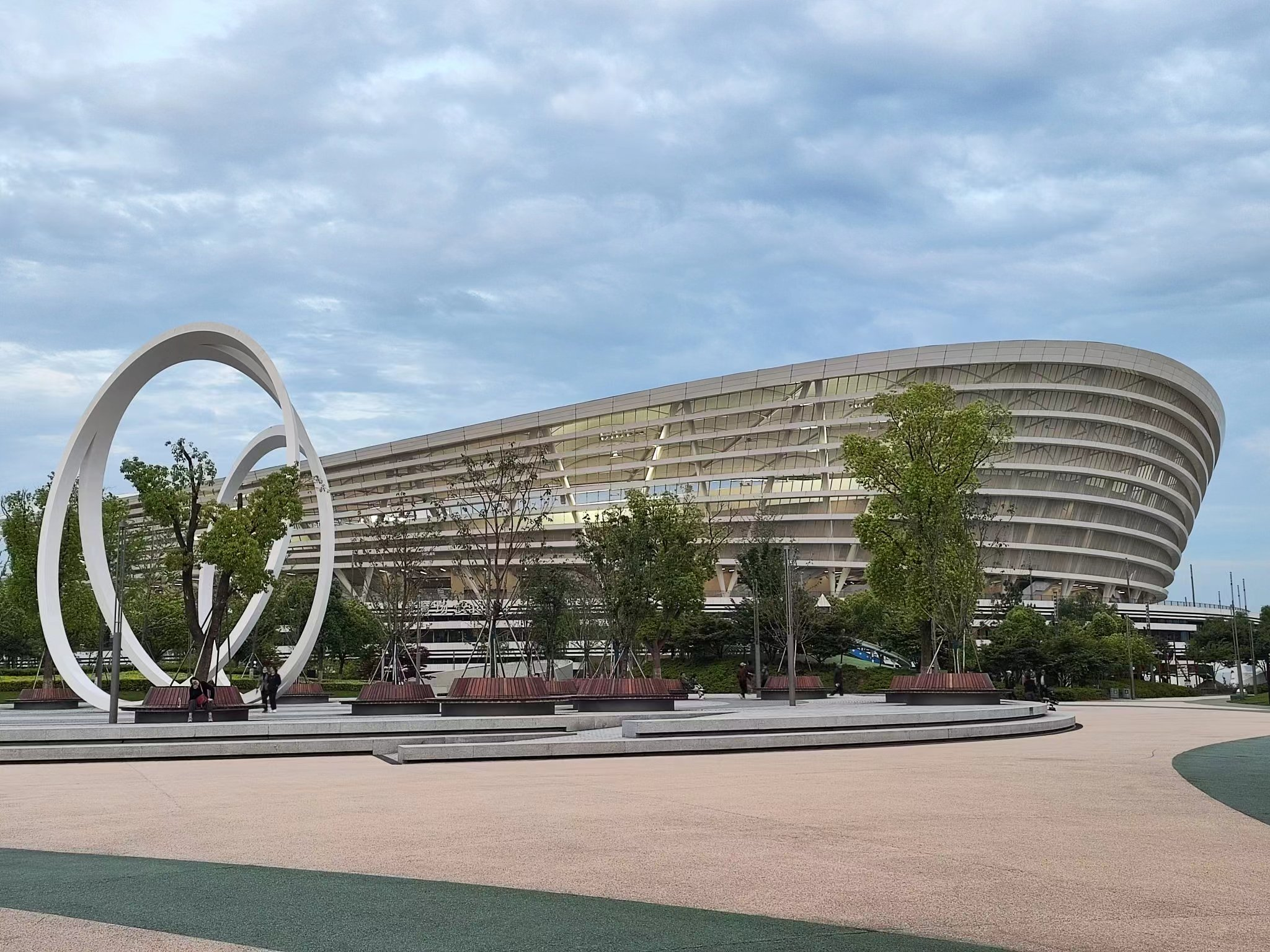
- Level: 2024 Diamond League

The 2024 Shanghai Diamond League was an outdoor track and field meeting on 27 April 2024. Last held at Shanghai Stadium in 2019, this meeting relocated 67 kilometres (42 mi) west to Suzhou Olympic Sports Centre. This was the first meeting in China after the COVID-19 pandemic in China. The meeting was officially advertised as the 2024 Yangtze Delta Athletics Diamond Gala. It was the second leg of the 2024 Diamond League, just one week after the 2024 Xiamen Diamond League.

== Highlights ==
At the meeting, Sha'Carri Richardson was upset by Daryll Neita in the women's 200 metres. Selemon Barega won the 5000 metres as expected, but 17-year-old Biniam Mehary surprised to place second.

== Diamond events results ==
Athletes competing in the Diamond League disciplines earned extra compensation and points which went towards qualifying for the 2024 Diamond League finals. First place earned 8 points, with each step down in place earning one less point than the previous, until no points are awarded in 9th place or lower. In the case of a tie, each tying athlete earns the full amount of points for the place.

=== Men's ===
100 Metres
Place	Athlete	Nation	Time	Points	Notes
1st place, gold medalist(s)	Akani Simbine	South Africa	10.01	8	=SB
2nd place, silver medalist(s)	Christian Coleman	United States	10.04	7	SB
3rd place, bronze medalist(s)	Fred Kerley	United States	10.11	6	
4	Emmanuel Eseme	Cameroon	10.17	5	
5	Ackeem Blake	Jamaica	10.23	4	
6	Rohan Watson	Jamaica	10.29	3	
7	Brandon Carnes	United States	10.35	2	
8	Yoshihide Kiryū	Japan	10.37	1	SB
9	Chen Guanfeng	China	10.47		SB
			Wind: (−0.1 m/s)		

800 Metres
Place	Athlete	Nation	Time	Points	Notes
1st place, gold medalist(s)	Slimane Moula	Algeria	1:44.55	8	SB
2nd place, silver medalist(s)	Wyclife Kinyamal	Kenya	1:44.88	7	
3rd place, bronze medalist(s)	Clayton Murphy	United States	1:45.18	6	SB
4	Abdelati El Guesse	Morocco	1:45.35	5	
5	Ethan Hussey	Great Britain	1:45.55	4	SB
6	Andreas Kramer	Sweden	1:45.92	3	
7	Mark English	Ireland	1:46.47	2	SB
8	Ermias Girma	Ethiopia	1:46.59	1	SB
9	Elias Ngeny	Kenya	1:46.98		
10	Ngeno Kipngetich	Kenya	1:47.09		
11	Tshepiso Masalela	Botswana	1:47.27		
—	Patryk Sieradzki	Poland	DNF		PM

5000 Metres
Place	Athlete	Nation	Time	Points	Notes
1st place, gold medalist(s)	Selemon Barega	Ethiopia	12:55.68	8	
2nd place, silver medalist(s)	Biniam Mehary	Ethiopia	12:56.37	7	
3rd place, bronze medalist(s)	Benson Kiplangat	Kenya	12:58.78	6	
4	Kuma Girma	Ethiopia	13:03.45	5	
5	Samwel Chebolei Masai	Kenya	13:04.00	4	
6	Mike Foppen	Netherlands	13:16.58	3	
7	Morgan McDonald	Australia	13:18.65	2	
8	Nibret Kinde	Ethiopia	13:18.97	1	
9	Jack Rayner	Australia	13:19.57		
10	Bastien Augusto	France	13:19.79		
11	Nibret Melak	Ethiopia	13:20.11		
12	Sam Parsons	Germany	13:20.30		
13	Brian Fay	Ireland	13:25.37		
14	Dan Kibet	Uganda	13:31.64		
—	Mohamed Abdilaahi	Germany	DNF		
—	Ronald Kwemoi	Kenya	DNF		
—	Kieran Tuntivate	Thailand	DNF		
—	Mounir Akbache	France	DNF		PM
—	Callum Davies	Australia	DNF		PM

110 Metres hurdles
Place	Athlete	Nation	Time	Points	Notes
1st place, gold medalist(s)	Daniel Roberts	United States	13.12	8	
2nd place, silver medalist(s)	Shunsuke Izumiya	Japan	13.23	7	
3rd place, bronze medalist(s)	Hansle Parchment	Jamaica	13.26 [.252]	6	SB
4	Cordell Tinch	United States	13.26 [.257]	5	
5	Eric Edwards Jr.	United States	13.37	4	
6	Xu Zhuoyi	China	13.43	3	SB
7	Zhu Shenglong	China	13.45	2	SB
8	Jamal Britt	United States	13.58	1	
			Wind: (+0.8 m/s)		

High jump
Place	Athlete	Nation	Height	Points	Notes
1st place, gold medalist(s)	Hamish Kerr	New Zealand	2.31 m	8	
2nd place, silver medalist(s)	Mutaz Barsham	Qatar	2.29 m	7	SB
3rd place, bronze medalist(s)	Vernon Turner	United States	2.27 m	6	SB
4	Thomas Carmoy	Belgium	2.24 m	5	SB
5	Shelby McEwen	United States	2.24 m	4	
5	Wang Zhen	China	2.24 m	4	=SB
7	Tomohiro Shinno	Japan	2.24 m	2	
8	Christoff Bryan	Jamaica	2.16 m	1	
9	Douwe Amels	Netherlands	2.12 m		
10	Tobias Potye	Germany	2.12 m		
—	Joel Baden	Australia	NM		

Pole vault
Place	Athlete	Nation	Height	Points	Notes
1st place, gold medalist(s)	Armand Duplantis	Sweden	6.00 m	8	MR
2nd place, silver medalist(s)	Ben Broeders	Belgium	5.82 m	7	SB
2nd place, silver medalist(s)	Sam Kendricks	United States	5.82 m	7	
4	Jacob Wooten	United States	5.72 m	5	
5	Huang Bokai	China	5.72 m	4	=SB
6	Chris Nilsen	United States	5.72 m	3	
7	Austin Miller	United States	5.62 m	2	
8	Yao Jie	China	5.42 m	1	
9	Bo Kanda Lita Baehre	Germany	5.42 m		
—	Zhong Tao	China	NM		

Long jump
Place	Athlete	Nation	Distance	Points	Notes
1st place, gold medalist(s)	Marquis Dendy	United States	8.05 m (−0.2 m/s)	8	=SB
2nd place, silver medalist(s)	Wang Jianan	China	8.04 m (±0.0 m/s)	7	SB
3rd place, bronze medalist(s)	Shi Yuhao	China	7.99 m (−0.7 m/s)	6	
4	Carey McLeod	Jamaica	7.93 m (+0.8 m/s)	5	
5	Mattia Furlani	Italy	7.88 m (+0.1 m/s)	4	
6	Will Williams	United States	7.75 m (−0.6 m/s)	3	
7	Jarrion Lawson	United States	7.74 m (+0.7 m/s)	2	
8	Lin Yu-tang	Chinese Taipei	7.63 m (−0.2 m/s)	1	SB
9	Tajay Gayle	Jamaica	7.56 m (−1.7 m/s)		
10	LaQuan Nairn	Bahamas	7.48 m (−0.1 m/s)		

=== Women's ===
200 Metres
Place	Athlete	Nation	Time	Points	Notes
1st place, gold medalist(s)	Daryll Neita	Great Britain	22.62	8	SB
2nd place, silver medalist(s)	Anavia Battle	United States	22.99	7	
3rd place, bronze medalist(s)	Sha'Carri Richardson	United States	23.11	6	
4	Tamara Clark	United States	23.13	5	
5	Mujinga Kambundji	Switzerland	23.21	4	SB
6	Anthonique Strachan	Bahamas	23.35	3	SB
7	Twanisha Terry	United States	23.37	2	
8	Caisja Chandler	United States	23.66	1	SB
			Wind: (+0.2 m/s)		

400 Metres
Place	Athlete	Nation	Time	Points	Notes
1st place, gold medalist(s)	Marileidy Paulino	Dominican Republic	50.89	8	
2nd place, silver medalist(s)	Talitha Diggs	United States	51.77	7	
3rd place, bronze medalist(s)	Sada Williams	Barbados	52.00	6	
4	Kaylin Whitney	United States	52.55	5	
5	Aliyah Abrams	Guyana	53.04	4	
6	Stephenie Ann McPherson	Jamaica	53.75	3	SB
7	Evelis Aguilar	Colombia	53.81	2	
8	Haruna Kuboyama	Japan	54.47	1	

100 Metres hurdles
Place	Athlete	Nation	Time	Points	Notes
1st place, gold medalist(s)	Jasmine Camacho-Quinn	Puerto Rico	12.63	8	
2nd place, silver medalist(s)	Devynne Charlton	Bahamas	12.64	7	
3rd place, bronze medalist(s)	Danielle Williams	Jamaica	12.74	6	
4	Masai Russell	United States	12.76	5	
5	Alaysha Johnson	United States	12.78	4	SB
6	Ditaji Kambundji	Switzerland	12.81	3	
7	Megan Tapper	Jamaica	12.83	2	SB
8	Wu Yanni	China	13.15	1	
—	Tobi Amusan	Nigeria	DQ		TR16.8 (Note: Amusan was disqualified for a false start, reacting 0.09 seconds after the starting pistol was fired. She ran the race anyways under protest, and appeared to finish first although no time was recorded.)
			Wind: (+0.3 m/s)		

3000 Metres steeplechase
Place	Athlete	Nation	Time	Points	Notes
1st place, gold medalist(s)	Beatrice Chepkoech	Kenya	9:07.36	8	
2nd place, silver medalist(s)	Peruth Chemutai	Uganda	9:15.46	7	
3rd place, bronze medalist(s)	Gesa Felicitas Krause	Germany	9:16.24	6	SB
4	Sembo Almayew	Ethiopia	9:19.14	5	SB
5	Gabrielle Jennings	United States	9:19.59	4	PB
6	Lomi Muleta	Ethiopia	9:24.39	3	
7	Daisy Jepkemei	Kazakhstan	9:25.10	2	SB
8	Stella Jepkosgei Rutto	Romania	9:25.31	1	PB
9	Regan Yee	Canada	9:26.12		SB
10	Frehiwot Gesese	Ethiopia	9:27.64		
11	Cara Feain-Ryan	Australia	9:31.68		SB
12	Jackline Chepkoech	Kenya	9:32.46		
13	Adva Cohen	Israel	9:36.83		
14	Aude Clavier	France	9:38.53		
15	Xu Shuangshuang	China	9:39.89		
16	Juliane Hvid	Denmark	9:49.81		SB
—	Fancy Cherono	Kenya	DNF		
—	Emma Coburn	United States	DNF		

Long jump
Place	Athlete	Nation	Distance	Points	Notes
1st place, gold medalist(s)	Marthe Koala	Burkina Faso	6.68 m (+0.1 m/s)	8	SB
2nd place, silver medalist(s)	Quanesha Burks	United States	6.59 m (−0.1 m/s)	7	
3rd place, bronze medalist(s)	Milica Gardašević	Serbia	6.52 m (±0.0 m/s)	6	
4	Xiong Shiqi	China	6.51 m (+0.6 m/s)	5	
5	Pauline Hondema	Netherlands	6.41 m (+0.1 m/s)	4	
6	Khaddi Sagnia	Sweden	6.40 m (+0.8 m/s)	3	SB
7	Alina Rotaru-Kottmann	Romania	6.36 m (+0.8 m/s)	2	
8	Fátima Diame	Spain	6.20 m (−0.3 m/s)	1	
9	Brooke Buschkuehl	Australia	6.19 m (+0.4 m/s)		
10	Eliane Martins	Brazil	5.82 m (+0.2 m/s)		

Shot put
Place	Athlete	Nation	Distance	Points	Notes
1st place, gold medalist(s)	Chase Jackson	United States	20.03 m	8	SB
2nd place, silver medalist(s)	Sarah Mitton	Canada	19.86 m	7	
3rd place, bronze medalist(s)	Song Jiayuan	China	19.83 m	6	SB
4	Gong Lijiao	China	19.61 m	5	
5	Adelaide Aquilla	United States	19.38 m	4	SB
6	Maddi Wesche	New Zealand	19.23 m	3	
7	Maggie Ewen	United States	19.16 m	2	SB
8	Danniel Thomas-Dodd	Jamaica	19.08 m	1	
9	Yemisi Ogunleye	Germany	18.52 m		
10	Jessica Schilder	Netherlands	17.81 m		

Javelin throw
Place	Athlete	Nation	Distance	Points	Notes
1st place, gold medalist(s)	Haruka Kitaguchi	Japan	62.97 m	8	SB
2nd place, silver medalist(s)	Mackenzie Little	Australia	62.12 m	7	SB
3rd place, bronze medalist(s)	Flor Ruiz	Colombia	60.70 m	6	SB
4	Maggie Malone	United States	60.47 m	5	SB
5	Lü Huihui	China	60.03 m	4	
6	Elina Tzengko	Greece	59.73 m	3	SB
7	Tori Peeters	New Zealand	59.11 m	2	SB
8	Līna Mūze	Latvia	58.51 m	1	
9	Qianqian Dai	China	57.49 m		
—	Kathryn Mitchell	Australia	NM		

== Promotional events results ==
=== Women's ===
5000 Metres
Place	Athlete	Nation	Time
1st place, gold medalist(s)	Mekedes Alemeshete	Ethiopia	14:36.70
2nd place, silver medalist(s)	Ayal Dagnachew	Ethiopia	14:36.86
3rd place, bronze medalist(s)	Letesenbet Gidey	Ethiopia	14:37.13
4	Wubrist Aschal	Ethiopia	14:37.28
5	Caroline Nyaga	Kenya	14:37.80
6	Asayech Ayichew	Ethiopia	14:38.73
7	Margaret Akidor	Kenya	14:39.54
8	Megan Keith	Great Britain	14:43.24
9	Edinah Jebitok	Kenya	14:44.63
10	Yenawa Nbret	Ethiopia	14:47.78
11	Rose Davies	Australia	14:47.86
12	Sarah Chelangat	Uganda	14:54.15
13	Lauren Ryan	Australia	14:58.69
14	Faith Cherotich	Kenya	15:03.78
15	Teresia Muthoni Gateri	Kenya	15:03.82
16	Isobel Batt-Doyle	Australia	15:06.84
17	Maudie Skyring	Australia	15:12.44
18	Francine Niyomukunzi	Burundi	15:12.89
19	Asmarech Anley	Ethiopia	15:18.37
20	Zhang Deshun	China	15:41.34
21	Aisha Praught-Leer	Jamaica	16:36.99
—	Sarah Billings	Australia	DNF
—	Winnie Nanyondo	Uganda	DNF

Discus throw
Place	Athlete	Nation	Distance
1st place, gold medalist(s)	Valarie Allman	United States	69.86 m
2nd place, silver medalist(s)	Feng Bin	China	67.11 m
3rd place, bronze medalist(s)	Yaime Pérez	Cuba	65.59 m
4	Izabela da Silva	Brazil	64.66 m
5	Jorinde van Klinken	Netherlands	63.31 m
6	Liliana Cá	Portugal	61.58 m
7	Claudine Vita	Germany	61.26 m
8	Jiang Zhichao	China	59.18 m
9	Wang Fang	China	58.24 m
—	Laulauga Tausaga	United States	NM

== National events results ==
=== Men's ===
100 Metres
Place	Athlete	Nation	Time
1st place, gold medalist(s)	Aodi Li	China	11.56
2nd place, silver medalist(s)	Jinzhe Zhnag	China	11.91
3rd place, bronze medalist(s)	Kaile He	China	11.94
4	Changhong Zhu	China	12.20
5	Zhuorui Zhan	China	12.59
6	Cheng Qian	China	12.69
7	Chenzhi Yan	China	12.65
8	Guosheng Qiu	China	12.76
9	Hongtao Shi	China	13.43
		Wind: (−0.8 m/s)	

800 Metres
Place	Athlete	Nation	Time
1st place, gold medalist(s)	Donghao Jin	China	2:04.34
2nd place, silver medalist(s)	Zheqing Wu	China	2:07.42
3rd place, bronze medalist(s)	Jianwen Chen	China	2:08.47
4	Jingxiang Cao	China	2:08.90
5	Penglai Pan	China	2:14.12
6	Yaoyuan Sun	China	2:15.17
7	Tianle Zhao	China	2:27.89
8	Jiapeng Zhou	China	2:39.61

5000 Metres
Place	Athlete	Nation	Time
1st place, gold medalist(s)	Lvnan Zhang	China	14:59.56
2nd place, silver medalist(s)	Jian Li	China	15:24.07
3rd place, bronze medalist(s)	Yang Xiao	China	15:26.26
4	Zhuoye Li	China	16:08.41
5	Zhi Xie	China	16:24.82
6	Feng Ke	China	16:47.68
7	Chunhua Ding	China	17:00.83
8	Haigang Zhou	China	17:03.83
9	Rui Xu	China	17:25.06
10	Yiyang Li	China	17:46.23
11	Yonggang Shi	China	18:36.23
12	Hualong Qin	China	20:01.29
—	Qijia Jin	China	DNF
—	Zhaoxiao Lu	China	DNF

=== Women's ===
400 Metres
Place	Athlete	Nation	Time
1st place, gold medalist(s)	Xinqi Qiao	China	1:05.35
2nd place, silver medalist(s)	Shuyao Wang	China	1:07.27
3rd place, bronze medalist(s)	Xinyue Jiang	China	1:08.14
4	Jiarui Chai	China	1:08.20
5	Yiqiong Jin	China	1:09.30
6	Guo Chen	China	1:10.41
7	Anqi Zhao	China	1:10.50
8	Xinyue Lv	China	1:18.26

== See also ==
- 2024 Diamond League
