= Biniam Mehary =

Ethiopian middle-distance runner

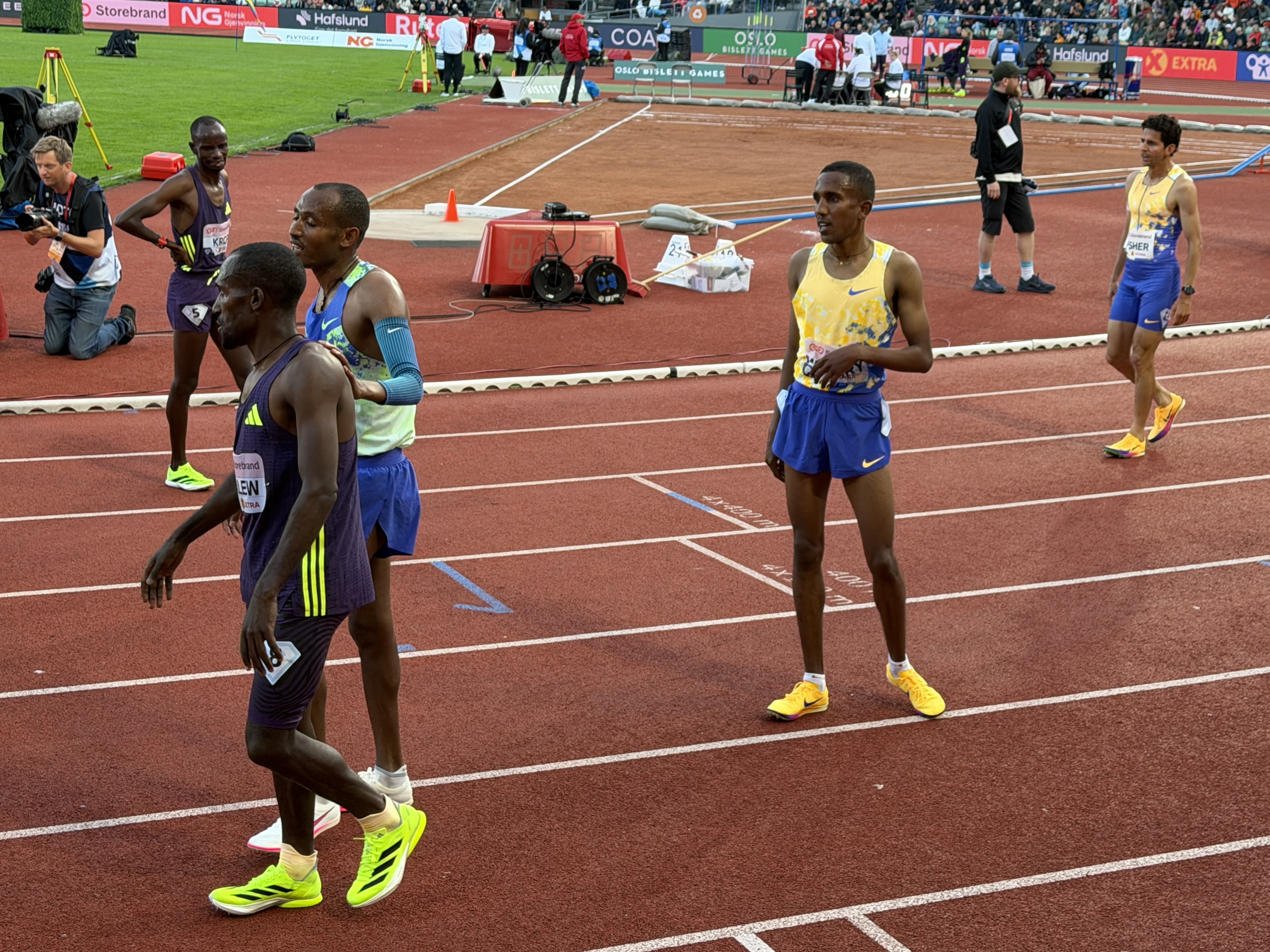
- Mehary at the 2026 Bislett Games

Personal information
- Nationality: Ethiopian
- Born: 20 December 2006 (age 19) Freweyni, Tigray Region, Ethiopia

Sport
- Sport: Athletics
- Events: 1500 metres, 3000 metres

Achievements and titles
- Personal bests: 1500 m (short track): 3:34.83 (Torun, 2024) WU20R; 3000m (short track): 7:29.99 (Lievin, 2025) WU20R; 5000m 12:45.93 (Oslo, 2025); 10,000 m: 26:37.93 (Nerja, 2024) WU20R; 5km (road): 13.04 (Al Khobar, 2023); 10km (road): 26:55 (Laredo, 2026)
Medal record
Men's athletics
Representing Ethiopia
World Cross Country Championships
Gold medal – first place	2026 Tallahassee	Senior team

Biniam Mehary (born 20 December 2006) is an Ethiopian middle and long-distance runner. In February 2024, he set a new under-20 world record in the 1500 metres indoors. That summer, he set a world under-20 record over 10,000 metres. The following year, he set a new under-20 world record in the 3000 metres indoors.

== Biography ==
Biniam competed in Toruń at the Copernicus Cup in February 2024 as a 17-year-old, he set a new under-20 world record in the 1500 metres of 3:34.83 beating the record set had been set by Jakob Ingebrigtsen in 2019. He then ran 7:33.04 to finish second in the 3000m at the 2024 Meeting Hauts-de-France Pas-de-Calais in Lievin.

He was selected to run for Ethiopia at the 2024 World Athletics Indoor Championships in Glasgow in the 1500m. He qualified for the final before finishing in ninth place overall.

He finished second at the 2024 Diamond League Shanghai over 5000 metres in a personal best time of 12:56.37. He set a new outdoors personal best over 5000m running 12:54.10 at the Los Angeles Grand Prix on 17 May 2024.

On 14 June 2024, Biniam competed in the Ethiopian Olympic 10,000m trials in Nerja, Spain. In one of the highest quality 10,000m races ever, four men finished inside 26:40 and six men finished inside 26:50 for the first time. Even though then 17-year-old Biniam Mehary did not qualify to compete in the Paris Olympic Games, he placed fourth in a world U20 record of 26:37.93, taking four seconds off the previous mark set 19 years ago by the late Samuel Wanjiru. He was later included in the Ethiopian team for the 2024 Paris Olympics replacing Yomif Kejelcha, where he placed sixth in the 5000m final.

He set a world under-20 record of 7:29.99 for the 3000 metres in Liévin on 13 February 2025. He was selected for the 3000 metres at the 2025 World Athletics Indoor Championships in Nanjing in March 2025, where he finished in ninth place. He ran a 5000 metres personal best of 12:45.93 at the 2025 Bislett Games, part of the 2025 Diamond League, on 12 June 2025. He ran 26:43.82 to win the 10,000 metres at the 2025 Prefontaine Classic on 5 July, in a race that doubled up as the Ethiopian trials for the 2025 World Championships. He placed fifth over 3000 metres at the Diamond League Final in Zurich on 28 August.

In September 2025, he was a finalist over 5000 metres at the 2025 World Championships in Tokyo, Japan, placing fifth overall. He was subsequently nominated for the World Athletics Rising Star Award.

Competing at the 2026 World Athletics Cross Country Championships, he placed sixth overall, winning the gold medal in the team competition. In April, he ran a personal best 26:55 on the road to win the 10 km en Ruta Villa de Laredo in Spain, ahead of compatriot Hagos Eyob. In May, he had a third-place finish over 5000 m at the 2026 Xiamen Diamond League. At the 2026 Diamond League Final in Brussels in September, he placed fourth over 5000 metres. Later that month, he placed fourth over 5000 m at the inaugural World Ultimate Championship in Budapest.

== Personal life ==
Mahery's uncle is former Olympian, Gebregziabher Gebremariam.
