= Rasheed Broadbell =

Jamaican hurdler (born 2000)

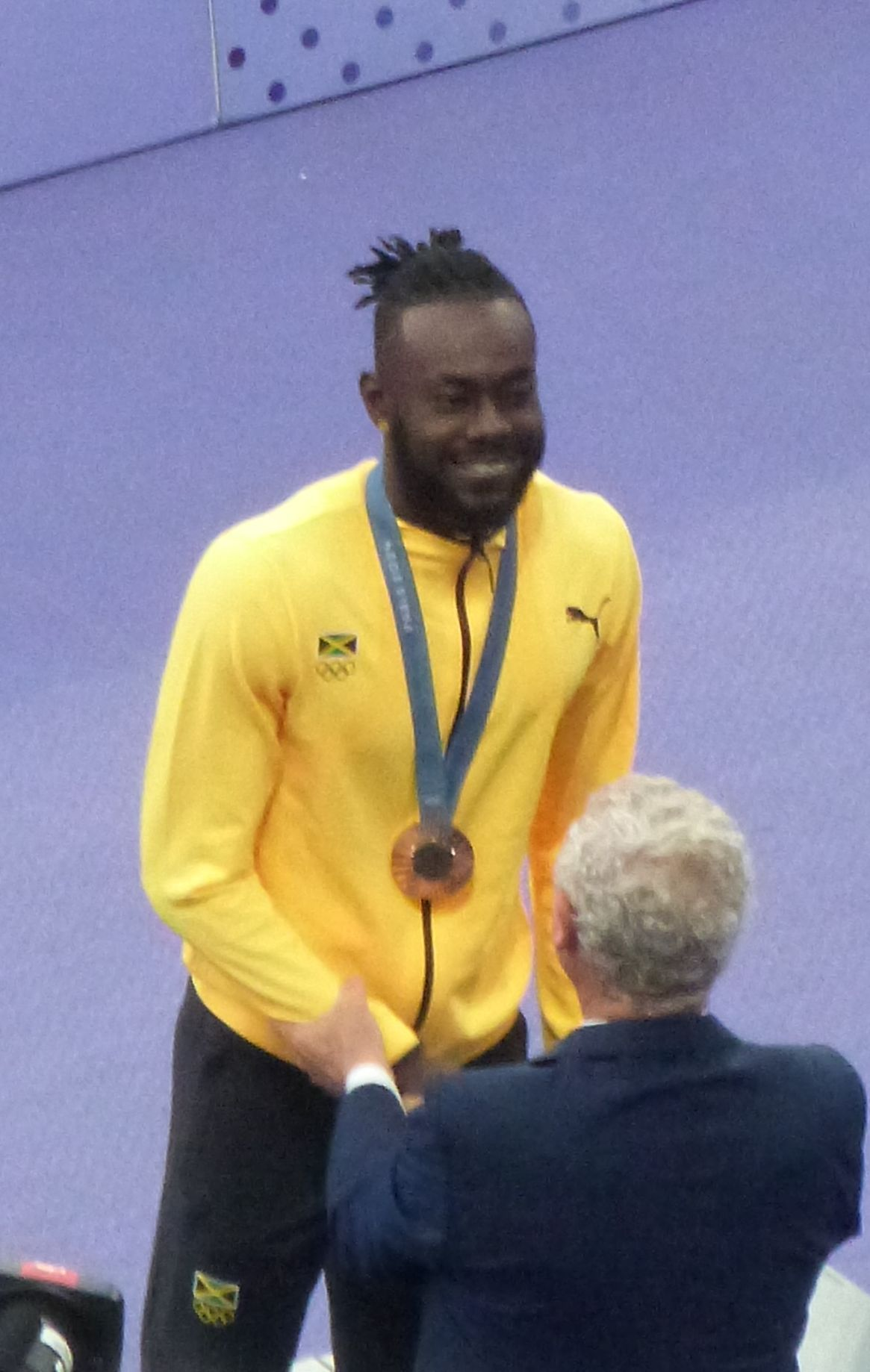
- Broadbell at the 2024 Summer Olympics

Personal information
- Born: 13 August 2000 (age 26) Kingston, Jamaica

Sport
- Country: Jamaica
- Sport: Track and field
- Event: 110 m hurdles
- Club: 1. MVP; 2. Elite Performance
- Coached by: 1. Stephen Francis; 2. Reynaldo Walcott; 3. Lonnie Green

Achievements and titles
- Personal bests: 110 m Hurdles: 12.94 (Kingston 2023); Indoors; 60 m Hurdles: 7.56 (Fayetteville 2024)
Medal record
Men's athletics
Representing Jamaica
Olympic Games
Bronze medal – third place	2024 Paris	110 m hurdles
Commonwealth Games
Gold medal – first place	2022 Birmingham	110 m hurdles
Diamond League
Second place	2022 Zurich	110 mh
Carifta Games Junior (U20)
Gold medal – first place	2019 George Town	110 m hurdles

Rasheed Broadbell (born 13 August 2000) is a Jamaican hurdler who specializes in the 110 metres hurdles, which he won at the 2022 Commonwealth Games. He also won the bronze medal in the same event at the 2024 Summer Olympics.

== Early life ==
Rasheed hails from the eastern parish of St. Thomas, Jamaica. He attended St. Jago High School in St. Catherine.

== Career ==
In 2021, Broadbell had a breakthrough year, running a personal best of 13.10 seconds in Kingston, however he was unable to qualify for the delayed 2020 Olympics due to injury.

At the 2022 Jamaican Championships, Broadbell finished second in 13.20 seconds to qualify for the 2022 World Championships, where he made the semi-finals. He went on to compete at the 2022 Commonwealth Games, winning gold in a new personal best and games record of 13.08 seconds. Later that year, he ran sub-13 and won his first Diamond League at the Lausanne Diamond League, running 12.99 seconds.

Broadbell won the 2023 Jamaican Championships in a new personal best of 12.94 seconds. He was disqualified in the heats at the 2023 World Championships after falling after hurdle nine.

In 2024, Broadbell ran a new personal best over 60 m hurdles of 7.56 seconds in Fayetteville. He won his second consecutive Jamaican title over 110 m hurdles to qualify for the 2024 Paris Olympics, where he won the bronze medal.

=== Track records ===
As of 14 September 2024, Broadbell holds the following track records for 110 metres hurdles.

Location	Time	Windspeed m/s	Date
Freeport	13.10	+0.2	13/05/2023
Rabat	13.08	–1.3	28/05/2023
