= Georgia Griffith =

Australian middle-distance runner

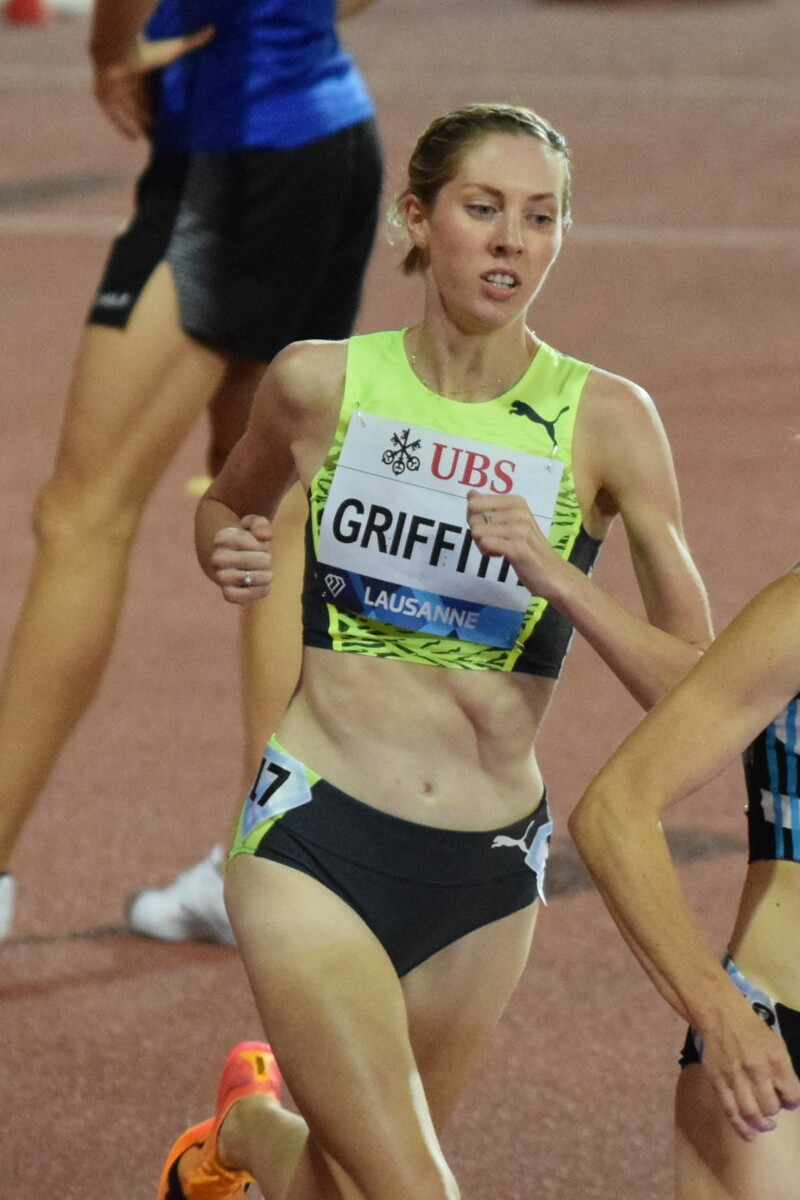
- Griffith in 2022

Personal information
- Nationality: Australian
- Born: 5 December 1996 (age 29) Canberra, Australia
- Education: Monash University
- Height: 1.72 m (5 ft 8 in)
- Weight: 52 kg (115 lb)

Sport
- Sport: Middle-distance running
- Events: 800 metres, 1500 metres, 5000 metres
- Club: Melbourne Track Club

Achievements and titles
- Personal bests: Outdoor; 800 m: 1:59.22 (Pfungstadt 2025); 1500 m: 3:58.25 (Budapest 2025); 3000 m: 8:24.20 AR (Oslo 2024); 5000 m: 14.32.82 (London 2024); Indoor; 1500 m: 4:00.80 (Nanjing 2025)

Georgia Helen Griffith (born 5 December 1996) is an Australian middle-distance runner. She mainly competes in the 1500 m and 5000 m.

In 2019, Griffith won a gold medal over 1500 m at the Oceania Championships. Later that year, she secured a silver medal in the same distance at the World University Games. She secured her first senior global medal, a bronze, over 1500 m at the 2025 World Indoor Championships.

Griffith finished fourth over 800 m at the 2014 World Junior Championships. She holds the Oceanian record for the 3000 m. She is the second-fastest Australian woman of all time in the 5000 m and fourth-fastest in the 1500 m. She has competed for Australia at the 2017, 2019, 2022 and 2025 World Athletics Championships as well as at the 2020 and 2024 Summer Olympics.

== Early years ==
Griffith in her mid-teens decided to take athletics seriously and commenced regular training. Just days after her 17th birthday, she won the 2013 Australian All Schools Championships 800m gold medal in a time of 2:09.

== Career ==
=== 2014-2019: Early career ===
Griffith competed at the 2014 World Junior Championships in Eugene, where she finished fourth in the 800 m and seventh in the 4×400 m relay. The following year, she won the 800 m at the Australian Junior Championships, running 2:07.02.

On 11 June 2017, Griffith broke ground to an 800 m personal best of 2:00.90 at the Portland Track Festival. Five days later, she took six seconds off of her 1500 m personal best, running a time of 4:07.32 at the Portland Stumptown Twilight meet. At the 2017 World Championships in London, she competed in both the 800 m and 1500 m, being eliminated in the heats of both events. She competed at the 2017 Summer Universiade in Taipei during August. After winner Rose Mary Almanza was initially disqualified, Griffith was awarded the bronze medal at the medal ceremony. However, Almanza was later reinstated following an appeal and Griffith was relegated to fourth position.

In 2018, she finished second behind Brittany McGowan over 800 m at the Australian Championships, running a time of 2:02.09. At the 2018 Commonwealth Games on the Gold Coast, she finished fifth in the 1500 m and went out in the heats of the 800 m. On 15 June, she set a new 800 m personal best of 2:00.13 in winning the Portland Stumptown Twilight meet.

The following year, she finished second over 800 m at the Australian Championships, running a time of 2:01.26. In June, she won the 1500 m title at the Oceanian Championships, running a championship record of 4:12.53. At the Summer Universiade held in Naples, Griffith won the silver medal in the 1500 m, finishing behind Caterina Granz. On 18 August, she won over 1500 m at the CAS Meeting in Schifflange, running 4:11.35 to finish over four seconds ahead of second-placed Martyna Galant. In October, she competed at the World Championships in Doha, where she made it to the semi-finals.

At the 2020 Summer Olympics in Tokyo, Griffith was eliminated in the heats of the 1500 m. She had only competed twice in the year prior due to an Achilles injury and planta fascia. On 5 June 2022, she set a major 1500 m personal best of 4:00.16 at the Rabat Diamond League to finish fourth. At the 2022 World Championships in Eugene, she made the final of the 1500 m, where she finished ninth in a time of 4:03.26. Later that year, she competed at the 2022 Commonwealth Games, where she was eliminated in the heats of the 800 m. On 10 August, she competed at the Monaco Diamond League, where she finished seventh in the 1500 m running a time of 4:00.96, her second-fastest time ever at the time.

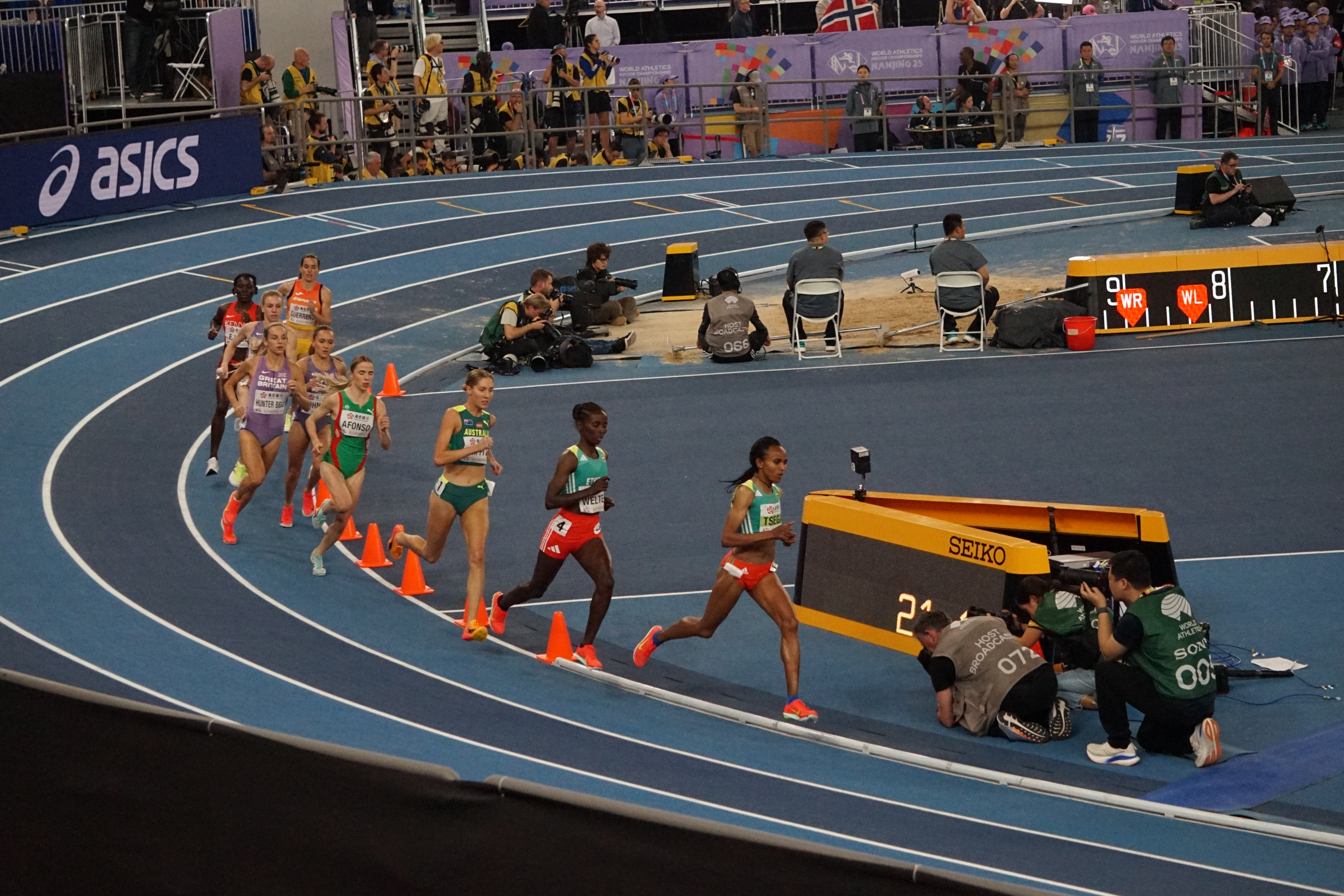
Griffith (third) competing at the 2025 World Indoor Championships.

In 2024, she competed at the Xiamen Diamond League on 20 April, where she finished sixth in the 1500 m in a time of 3:59.04 - her first time under the 4-minute barrier. On 30 May, Griffith won her first ever Diamond League, emerging victorious over 3000 m at the Bislett Games, running an Oceanian area record of 8:24.20 to narrowly beat Likina Amebaw by 0.09 s. On 21 June, at the Meeting Madrid, she ran her first sub-2 minute 800 m by running 1:59.89 s. At the Summer Olympics in Paris, she made the semi-finals of the 1500 m, where she was eliminated. On 14 September, she competed at the Diamond League Final in Brussels, running a new personal best of 3:58.40 to finish sixth.

At the 2025 World Indoor Championships in Nanjing, Griffith ran a new Oceanian indoor 1500 m record of 4:00.80. Having originally finished fourth, she was upgraded to bronze following Diribe Welteji's doping ban. On 19 July, she ran a major new personal best of 14:32.82 to finish fifth at the London Diamond League, her performance put her second on the all-time Australian list for the distance. She improved her 1500 m personal best at the Gyulai István Memorial on 12 August, winning in a meeting record of 3:58.25. She also set an 800 m personal best of 1:59.22 on 20 August at the Internationales Abendsportfest meet in Pfungstadt. At the World Championships in Tokyo, she was eliminated in the heats of the 5000 m.

== Personal bests ==
| Event | Time | Location | Date | Notes |
|---|---|---|---|---|
| 800 metres | 1:59.22 | Pfungstadt, Germany | 20 August 2025 | |
| 1000 metres | 2:34.50 | Melbourne, Australia | 6 March 2025 | then a NR & AR |
| 1500 metres | 3:58.25 | Budapest, Hungary | 12 August 2025 | #4 Australia all-time* |
| 1500 metres indoors | 4:00.80 | Nanjing, China | 23 March 2025 | #2 Australia all-time* |
| Mile | 4:27.81 | London, United Kingdom | 14 May 2022 | #9 Australia all-time* |
| 2000 metres | 5:28.82 | Monaco | 12 July 2024 | #2 Australia all-time* |
| 3000 metres | 8:24.20 | Oslo, Norway | 30 May 2024 | AR*, NR* |
| 5000 metres | 14:32.82 | London, United Kingdom | 19 July 2025 | #2 Australian all time* |

- as at 28 April 2026
