= Margaret Akidor =

Kenyan runner (born 2002)

Personal information
- Full name: Margaret Ngathike Akidor
- Nationality: Kenya
- Born: 26 June 2002 (age 24)
- Height: 162 cm (5 ft 4 in)
- Weight: 46 kg (101 lb)

Sport
- Sport: Athletics
- Events: 5000 metres 3000 metres
- Club: Comodi-iida Athletics Club

Achievements and titles
- National finals: 2017 Kenyan U20s; • 6km XC, 28th; 2020 Kenyan U20s; • 6km XC, 5th
- Personal bests: 5000 m: 14:44.83 (2022) 3000 m: 8:29.88 (2023)
- Updated on 15 January 2024

Margaret Ngathike Akidor (born 26 June 2002), also spelled Margaret Ekidor, is a Kenyan middle- and long-distance runner specializing in the 5000 metres. Since 2019, she is based in Japan and trains under the Comodi-iida Athletics Club. She currently has the record for the fastest 3000 metres time ever run on Japanese soil.

== Career ==
In February 2017, Akidor placed 28th in her first Kenyan Cross Country Championships U20 race. After placing 5th in the same race three years later, she was selected for the Kenyan U20 team at the 2020 African Cross Country Championships in Togo – however, the championships were indefinitely delayed due to the 2020 Togolese presidential election and the COVID-19 pandemic, ultimately taking away Akidor's first chance to represent Kenya internationally.

After first racing in Japan in July 2019, she ran under 15 minutes for 5000 m in 2021 to win the GENJO Record Meeting in Tokyo. In November 2022, she ran 8:32.53 for 3000 metres in Yokohama, the fastest time ever run on Japanese soil.

Akidor's best-ranked performance was an 8:29.88 3000 m to finish 3rd at the 2023 Xiamen Diamond League, which was the 9th-fastest 3000 m run in the world that year. In December 2023, Akidor ran her second half marathon, defending her title at the Sanyo Ladies half marathon in a time of 1:09:29.

== Personal life ==
Originally from Kenya, Akidor now lives in Japan where she trains with the Comodi-iida Athletics Club. Along with Teresia Muthoni, she would make trips between Japan and Kenya to compete for national teams. Until the end of 2022, she studied Japanese language in Tokyo.

== Statistics ==
=== Personal best progression ===
5000m progression
#	Mark	Pl.	Competition	Venue	Date	Ref.
1	16:55.4h	3rd place, bronze medalist(s)	Kenya National Secondary Schools Championship	Mombasa, Kenya	7 Jun 2017	
2	16:41.4h	2nd place, silver medalist(s)	Kenya Secondary Schools Sports Association Term 1 Games	Kigari, Kenya	10 Apr 2018	
3	15:13.62	1st place, gold medalist(s)	Niigata Record Meeting	Niigata, Japan	10 Oct 2020	
4	15:10.10	1st place, gold medalist(s)	Niigata Prefectural High School Ekiden	Niigata, Japan	28 Oct 2020	
5	14:57.03	1st place, gold medalist(s)	GENJO Record Meeting	Tokyo, Japan	22 Sep 2021	
6	14:55.43	1st place, gold medalist(s)	Nippon Sport Science University Long Distance Competition	Yokohama, Japan	12 Nov 2021	
7	14:44.83	1st place, gold medalist(s)	Nippon Sport Science University Long Distance Competition	Yokohama, Japan	11 Nov 2022	
