= 2024–25 World Athletics Cross Country Tour =

- Organisers: World Athletics
- Edition: 4th
- Dates: 2024 – 2025 (Gold level)

The 2024–25 World Athletics Cross Country Tour, also known as the 2025 Cross Country Tour, is the fourth season of the annual series of cross country running meetings organised by World Athletics. The Tour forms the highest level of international cross country.

The Cross Country Tour is divided into three levels – Gold, Silver, and Bronze – each of which has different levels of competition and different prize offerings.

The Gold-level meetings award extra World Athletics Rankings cross country placement points, which can be used to earn automatic qualification into the 10,000 metres track race at the 2025 World Athletics Championships.

The Tour is also seen by some as a way to prepare for the 2024 European Cross Country Championships.

== Schedule ==
Date	Meeting	Venue	Country	Men's winner	Women's winner
Gold (16)
20 Oct	Cross Internacional Zornotza	Amorebieta-Etxano	Spain	Rodrigue Kwizera (BDI)	Francine Niyomukunzi (BDI)
27 Oct	Cross Internacional de Atapuerca	Atapuerca	Spain	Rodrigue Kwizera (BDI)	Daisy Jepkemei (KAZ)
9 Nov	Cardiff Cross Challenge	Cardiff	Great Britain	Keneth Kiprop (UGA)	Charity Cherop (UGA)
10 Nov	Campo a Través Internacional de Soria	Soria	Spain	Rodrigue Kwizera (BDI)	Mercy Chepkemoi (KEN)
17 Nov	Cinque Mulini	San Vittore Olona	Italy	Matthew Kipkoech Kipruto (KEN)	Yenenesh Shimeket (ETH)
17 Nov	Cross international Le Maine Libre-Allonnes-Sarthe	Allonnes	France	Jimmy Gressier (FRA)	Grace Loibach Nawowuna (KEN)
17 Nov	Cross Internacional de Itálica	Santiponce	Spain	Thierry Ndikumwenayo (BDI)	Beatrice Chebet (KEN)
21 Nov	Cross Champs	Austin, TX	United States	Edwin Kurgat (KEN)	Emily Venters (USA)
24 Nov	Cross Internacional de Alcobendas - Comunidad de Madrid	Alcobendas	Spain	Rodrigue Kwizera (BDI)	Nadia Battocletti (ITA)
24 Nov	Festival du Cross-Country	Carhaix	France	Matthew Kipkoech Kipruto (KEN)	Belinda Chemutai (UGA)
7 Dec	The Great Chepsaita Cross Country	Eldoret	Kenya	Samwel Chebolei Masai (KEN)	Loice Chekwemoi (UGA)
15 Dec	Cross Internacional Venta de Baños	Venta de Baños	Spain	Nassim Hassaous (ESP)	Carolina Robles (ESP)
5 Jan	Elgoibar Cross Country Juan Muguerza Memorial	Elgoibar	Spain	Berihu Aregawi (ETH)	Beatrice Chebet (KEN)
6 Jan	Campaccio-International Cross Country	San Giorgio su Legnano	Italy	Telahun Haile Bekele (ETH)	Nadia Battocletti (ITA)
26 Jan	Cross Cup de Hannut	Hannut	Belgium	Rogers Kibet (UGA)	Sheila Jebet (KEN)
23 Feb	Sirikwa Classic Cross Country Tour – Gold	Eldoret	Kenya	Daniel Ebenyo (KEN)	Agnes Ngetich (KEN)
Silver (8)
28 Sep	TCS Lidingöloppet	Lidingö	Sweden	Ebba Tulu Chala (SWE)	Carolina Wikström (SWE)
13 Oct	Autumn Open International	Dublin	Ireland	Keelan Kilrehill (IRL)	Sophie Tarver (GBR)
3 Nov	Cross Internacional de San Sebastián	San Sebastián	Spain	Santiago Catrofe (URU)	Diana Chepkemoi (KEN)
9 Nov	Sparkassen Cross Pforzheim	Pforzheim	Germany	Markus Görger (GER)	Maurine Jepkoech Chebor (KEN)
24 Nov	International Warandecross Tilburg	Tilburg	Netherlands	Niels Laros (NED)	Sarah Lahti (SWE)
6 Dec	Trofeo Ibercaja Zaragoza Gran Premio de Aragon	Zaragoza	Spain	Ezekiel Letaya (KEN)	Cristina Espejo (ESP)
22 Dec	Amurrioko Nazioarteko Krosa - Cross Internacional de Amurrio	Amurrio	Spain	Younés Kniya (MAR)	Majida Maayouf (ESP)
19 Jan	Gran Premio Cáceres de la Diputación de Cáceres	Garrovillas de Alconétar	Spain	Dan Kibet (UGA)	Daisy Jepkemei (KAZ)
Bronze (5)
28 Sep	Castlegar International Cross Country	Galway	Ireland	Keelan Kilrehill (IRL)	Lauren Tinkler (IRL)
12 Jan	Cross Internacional Ciudad de Valladolid	Valladolid	Spain	Samuel Firewu (ETH)	Majida Maayouf (ESP)
19 Jan	International La Mandria Cross	Venaria Reale	Italy	Emmanuel Korir Kiplagat (KEN)	Yenenesh Shimeket (ETH)
9 Feb	Cross della Vallagarina	Villa Lagarina	Italy	Celestin Ndikumana (BDI)	Ruken Tek (TUR)
2 Mar	International White Cross	Beograd	Serbia	Shadrack Kimaiyo (KEN)	Valentine Benedek-Jebet (KEN)
