= 2025 Prefontaine Classic =

Athletics meeting in Eugene, United States

- Dates: 5 July 2025
- Host city: Eugene, Oregon, United States
- Venue: Hayward Field
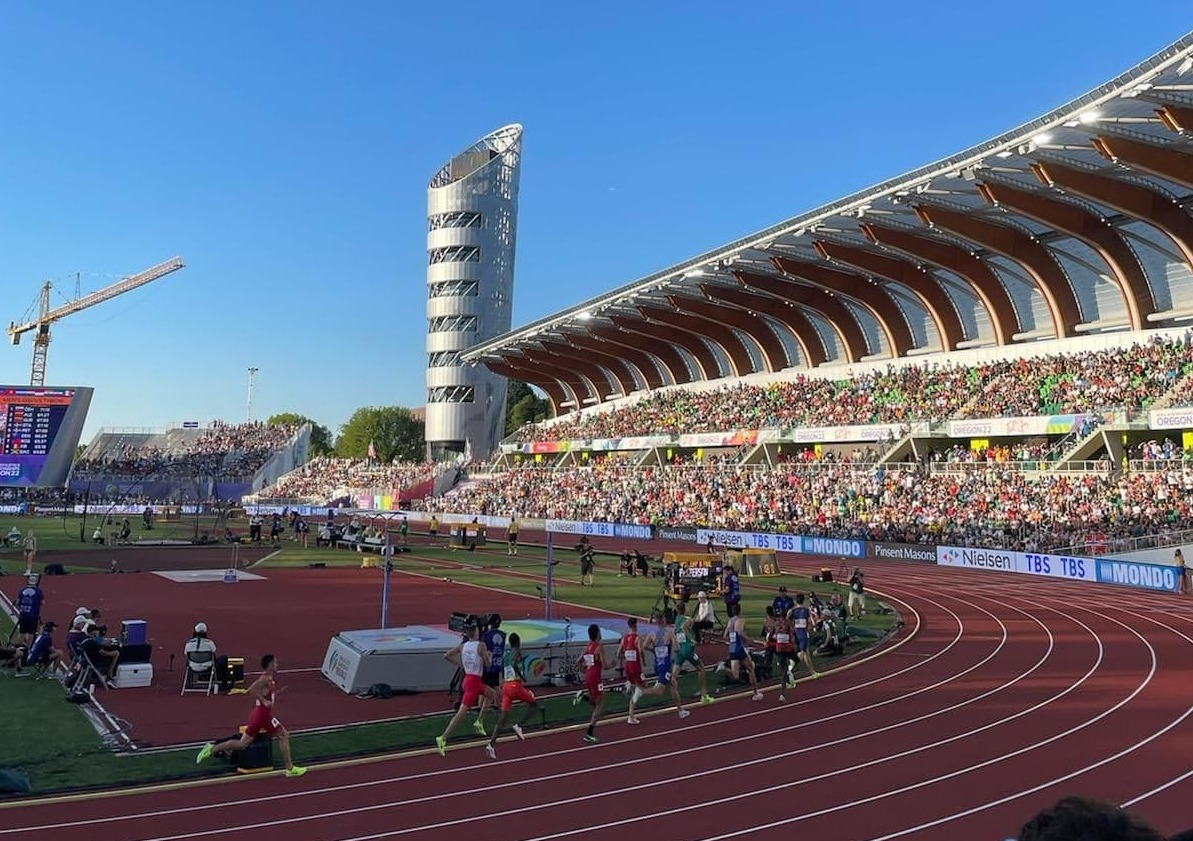
- Level: 2025 Diamond League

The 2025 Prefontaine Classic was the 50th edition of the annual outdoor track and field meeting in Eugene, Oregon, United States. It was held on 5 July at Hayward Field, it was the 9th leg of the 2025 Diamond League – the highest-level international track and field circuit.

== Diamond+ events results ==
Starting in 2025 a new discipline of events was added called Diamond+, these 4 events per meet awarded athletes with increased prize money whilst keeping the standard points format to qualify for the Diamond league finals. First place earns 8 points, with each step down in place earning one less point than the previous, until no points are awarded in 9th place or lower. In the case of a tie, each tying athlete earns the full amount of points for the place.

=== Men's ===
100 metres
Place	Athlete	Nation	Time	Points	Notes
1st place, gold medalist(s)	Kishane Thompson	Jamaica	9.85	8	
2nd place, silver medalist(s)	Zharnel Hughes	Great Britain	9.91	7	SB
3rd place, bronze medalist(s)	Trayvon Bromell	United States	9.94	6	
4	Brandon Hicklin	United States	9.98	5	
5	Ackeem Blake	Jamaica	10.03	4	
6	Bayanda Walaza	South Africa	10.04	3	
7	Christian Coleman	United States	10.06	2	=SB
8	Lachlan Kennedy	Australia	10.07	1	
9	Jeremiah Azu	Great Britain	10.20		
			Wind: (+0.4 m/s)		

Mile
Place	Athlete	Nation	Time	Points	Notes
1st place, gold medalist(s)	Niels Laros	Netherlands	3:45.94	8	NR
2nd place, silver medalist(s)	Yared Nuguse	United States	3:45.95	7	SB
3rd place, bronze medalist(s)	Azeddine Habz	France	3:46.65	6	NR
4	Cole Hocker	United States	3:47.43	5	PB
5	Reynold Cheruiyot	Kenya	3:47.46	4	PB
6	Cameron Myers	Australia	3:47.50	3	
7	Timothy Cheruiyot	Kenya	3:47.71	2	PB
8	Jake Wightman	Great Britain	3:47.82	1	PB
9	Grant Fisher	United States	3:48.29		PB
10	Hobbs Kessler	United States	3:48.32		
11	Festus Lagat	Kenya	3:48.93		PB
12	Neil Gourley	Great Britain	3:49.41		
13	Stefan Nillessen	Netherlands	3:49.53		
14	Abel Kipsang	Kenya	3:50.93		SB
15	Oliver Hoare	Australia	3:51.60		
—	Abraham Alvarado	United States	DNF		PM

=== Women's ===
800 metres
Place	Athlete	Nation	Time	Points	Notes
1st place, gold medalist(s)	Tsige Duguma	Ethiopia	1:57.10	8	
2nd place, silver medalist(s)	Prudence Sekgodiso	South Africa	1:57.16	7	=PB
3rd place, bronze medalist(s)	Halimah Nakaayi	Uganda	1:57.89	6	SB
4	Anaïs Bourgoin	France	1:58.41	5	
5	Shafiqua Maloney	Saint Vincent and the Grenadines	1:58.49 [.483]	4	
6	Raevyn Rogers	United States	1:58.49 [.487]	3	SB
7	Jemma Reekie	Great Britain	1:58.66	2	=SB
8	Worknesh Mesele	Ethiopia	1:59.72	1	
9	Mary Moraa	Kenya	2:00.51		
10	Athing Mu-Nikolayev	United States	2:03.44		SB
—	Michaela Rose	United States	DNF		PM

Discus throw
Place	Athlete	Nation	Distance	Points	Notes
1st place, gold medalist(s)	Valarie Allman	United States	70.68 m	8	MR
2nd place, silver medalist(s)	Cierra Jackson	United States	67.82 m	7	PB
3rd place, bronze medalist(s)	Sandra Elkasević	Croatia	66.97 m	6	SB
4	Jorinde van Klinken	Netherlands	66.19 m	5	
5	Yaime Pérez	Cuba	65.96 m	4	
6	Laulauga Tausaga	United States	64.94 m	3	
7	Marike Steinacker	Germany	63.64 m	2	
8	Jayden Ulrich	United States	62.15 m	1	

== Diamond events results ==
=== Men's ===
200 metres
Place	Athlete	Nation	Time	Points	Notes
1st place, gold medalist(s)	Letsile Tebogo	Botswana	19.76	8	WL
2nd place, silver medalist(s)	Courtney Lindsey	United States	19.87	7	SB
3rd place, bronze medalist(s)	Alexander Ogando	Dominican Republic	19.94	6	
4	Robert Gregory	United States	20.04	5	SB
5	Jereem Richards	Trinidad and Tobago	20.23	4	
6	Bryan Levell	Jamaica	20.25	3	
7	Aaron Brown	Canada	20.44	2	
8	Joseph Fahnbulleh	Liberia	20.53	1	
9	Kyree King	United States	20.67		
			Wind: (+0.7 m/s)		

400 metres
Place	Athlete	Nation	Time	Points	Notes
1st place, gold medalist(s)	Matthew Hudson-Smith	Great Britain	44.10	8	SB
2nd place, silver medalist(s)	Christopher Bailey	United States	44.15	7	PB
3rd place, bronze medalist(s)	Jacory Patterson	United States	44.31	6	
4	Khaleb McRae	United States	44.45	5	
5	Muzala Samukonga	Zambia	44.49	4	SB
6	Charlie Dobson	Great Britain	44.65	3	
7	Kirani James	Grenada	44.80	2	SB
8	Alexander Doom	Belgium	45.68	1	

400 metres hurdles
Place	Athlete	Nation	Time	Points	Notes
1st place, gold medalist(s)	Alison dos Santos	Brazil	46.65	8	SB
2nd place, silver medalist(s)	Rai Benjamin	United States	46.71	7	
3rd place, bronze medalist(s)	Ezekiel Nathaniel	Nigeria	47.88	6	
4	Trevor Bassitt	United States	48.29	5	
5	Abderrahman Samba	Qatar	48.76	4	
6	CJ Allen	United States	49.58	3	
7	Assinie Wilson	Jamaica	49.89	2	
8	Alessandro Sibilio	Italy	50.17	1	
9	Malik James-King	Jamaica	50.21		

Shot put
Place	Athlete	Nation	Distance	Points	Notes
1st place, gold medalist(s)	Joe Kovacs	United States	22.48 m	8	WL
2nd place, silver medalist(s)	Roger Steen	United States	22.11 m	7	PB
3rd place, bronze medalist(s)	Chukwuebuka Enekwechi	Nigeria	22.10 m	6	AR
4	Adrian Piperi	United States	22.09 m	5	PB
5	Rajindra Campbell	Jamaica	22.04 m	4	SB
6	Payton Otterdahl	United States	21.92 m	3	
7	Leonardo Fabbri	Italy	21.71 m	2	
8	Tom Walsh	New Zealand	21.50 m	1	

=== Women's ===
100 metres
Place	Athlete	Nation	Time	Points	Notes
1st place, gold medalist(s)	Melissa Jefferson-Wooden	United States	10.75	8	
2nd place, silver medalist(s)	Julien Alfred	Saint Lucia	10.77	7	
3rd place, bronze medalist(s)	Marie Josée Ta Lou-Smith	Ivory Coast	10.90	6	SB
4	Tina Clayton	Jamaica	11.02	5	
5	Favour Ofili	Nigeria	11.09	4	
6	Dina Asher-Smith	Great Britain	11.14	3	
7	Twanisha Terry	United States	11.17 [.161]	2	
8	Maia McCoy	United States	11.17 [.169]	1	
9	Sha'Carri Richardson	United States	11.19		SB
			Wind: (−1.5 m/s)		

1500 metres
Place	Athlete	Nation	Time	Points	Notes
1st place, gold medalist(s)	Faith Kipyegon	Kenya	3:48.68	8	WR
2nd place, silver medalist(s)	Jessica Hull	Australia	3:52.67	6	SB
3rd place, bronze medalist(s)	Georgia Hunter Bell	Great Britain	3:54.76	5	SB
4	Nikki Hiltz	United States	3:55.96	4	SB
5	Sinclaire Johnson	United States	3:56.93	3	SB
6	Sarah Healy	Ireland	3:57.20	2	
7	Saron Berhe	Ethiopia	3:57.72	1	PB
8	Freweyni Hailu	Ethiopia	3:57.74		SB
9	Susan Ejore	Kenya	3:57.91		
10	Emily Mackay	United States	3:58.05		
11	Heather MacLean	United States	4:00.20		
12	Shelby Houlihan	United States	4:02.38		
13	Elise Cranny	United States	4:03.31		
14	Erin Wallace	Great Britain	4:06.26		
—	Sage Hurta-Klecker	United States	DNF		PM
	Diribe Welteji	Ethiopia	~~3:51.44~~	~~7~~	DSQ

5000 metres
Place	Athlete	Nation	Time	Points	Notes
1st place, gold medalist(s)	Beatrice Chebet	Kenya	13:58.06	8	WR
2nd place, silver medalist(s)	Agnes Jebet Ngetich	Kenya	14:01.29	7	PB
3rd place, bronze medalist(s)	Gudaf Tsegay	Ethiopia	14:04.41	6	SB
4	Margaret Akidor	Kenya	14:30.34	5	PB
5	Caroline Nyaga	Kenya	14:30.45	4	SB
6	Medina Eisa	Ethiopia	14:31.15	3	
7	Aleshign Baweke	Ethiopia	14:31.94	2	
8	Fantaye Belayneh	Ethiopia	14:33.27	1	PB
9	Asayech Ayichew	Ethiopia	14:34.20		
10	Weini Kelati	United States	14:38.15		SB
11	Hirut Meshesha	Ethiopia	14:40.01		
12	Janeth Chepngetich	Kenya	14:40.25		PB
13	Mekedes Alemeshete	Ethiopia	14:43.29		SB
14	Caroline Kariba	Kenya	14:44.96		PB
15	Maurine Chebor	Kenya	14:50.68		PB
16	Aynadis Mebratu	Ethiopia	14:51.37		
17	Marta Alemayo	Ethiopia	14:56.34		SB
18	Fotyen Tesfay	Ethiopia	15:04.83		SB
19	Hellen Ekalale Lobun	Kenya	15:10.30		SB
20	Yenawa Nbret	Ethiopia	15:11.02		
21	Konstanze Klosterhalfen	Germany	15:14.22		SB
—	Birke Haylom	Ethiopia	DNF		
—	Tsigie Gebreselama	Ethiopia	DNF		
—	Dorcus Ewoi	Kenya	DNF		PM
—	Klaudia Kazimierska	Poland	DNF		PM

3000 metres steeplechase
Place	Athlete	Nation	Time	Points	Notes
1st place, gold medalist(s)	Winfred Yavi	Bahrain	8:45.25	8	MR, WL
2nd place, silver medalist(s)	Faith Cherotich	Kenya	8:48.71	7	PB
3rd place, bronze medalist(s)	Peruth Chemutai	Uganda	8:51.77	6	SB
4	Norah Jeruto	Kazakhstan	8:59.46	5	SB
5	Sembo Almayew	Ethiopia	8:59.90	4	PB
6	Gabrielle Jennings	United States	9:06.61	3	PB
7	Alemnat Walle	Ethiopia	9:06.88	2	PB
8	Kaylee Mitchell	United States	9:08.66	1	PB
9	Lexy Halladay-Lowry	United States	9:09.47		
10	Alice Finot	France	9:09.84		SB
11	Marwa Bouzayani	Tunisia	9:15.77		
12	Valerie Constien	United States	9:16.57		SB
13	Olivia Markezich	United States	9:17.95		SB
14	Lomi Muleta	Ethiopia	9:20.46		
15	Pamela Kosgei	Kenya	9:22.66		
16	Courtney Wayment	United States	9:25.86		
—	Gesa Felicitas Krause	Germany	DNF		
—	Krissy Gear	United States	DNF		PM

Long jump
Place	Athlete	Nation	Distance	Points	Notes
1st place, gold medalist(s)	Tara Davis-Woodhall	United States	7.07 m	8	=WL
2nd place, silver medalist(s)	Malaika Mihambo	Germany	7.01 m	7	
3rd place, bronze medalist(s)	Claire Bryant	United States	6.80 m	6	
4	Jasmine Moore	United States	6.71 m	5	
5	Lex Brown	United States	6.71 m	4	
6	Ackelia Smith	Jamaica	6.67 m	3	
7	Ivana Španović	Serbia	6.52 m	2	
8	Quanesha Burks	United States	6.42 m	1	
9	Monae' Nichols	United States	6.33 m		

Shot put
Place	Athlete	Nation	Distance	Points	Notes
1st place, gold medalist(s)	Chase Jackson	United States	20.94 m	8	MR
2nd place, silver medalist(s)	Sarah Mitton	Canada	20.39 m	7	
3rd place, bronze medalist(s)	Jaida Ross	United States	20.13 m	6	PB
4	Maddi Wesche	New Zealand	20.06 m	5	PB
5	Jessica Schilder	Netherlands	20.03 m	4	
6	Maggie Ewen	United States	19.71 m	3	
7	Fanny Roos	Sweden	19.27 m	2	
8	Gong Lijiao	China	19.22 m	1	
9	Yemisi Ogunleye	Germany	18.83 m		
10	Mya Lesnar	United States	18.23 m		

== Promotional events results ==
=== Men's ===
10,000 metres
Place	Athlete	Nation	Time	Notes
1st place, gold medalist(s)	Biniam Mehary	Ethiopia	26:43.82	WL
2nd place, silver medalist(s)	Berihu Aregawi	Ethiopia	26:43.84	SB
3rd place, bronze medalist(s)	Selemon Barega	Ethiopia	26:44.13	SB
4	Edwin Kurgat	Kenya	26:46.35	PB
5	Ishmael Kipkurui	Kenya	26:47.72	PB
6	Benson Kiplangat	Kenya	26:50.00	PB
7	Stanley Mburu	Kenya	26:56.36	PB
8	Mezgebu Sime	Ethiopia	27:04.17	SB
9	Nicholas Kimeli	Kenya	27:06.76	SB
10	Samwel Chebolei Masai	Kenya	27:07.65	PB
11	Amos Kipkemoi	Kenya	27:24.47	SB
12	Conner Mantz	United States	27:35.22	SB
13	Matthew Kipkoech Kipruto	Kenya	27:42.26	SB
14	Gideon Rono	Kenya	27:42.82	
15	Keneth Kiprop	Uganda	27:47.91	SB
16	Robert Kiprop	Kenya	27:51.46	PB
17	Mathew Kipsang	Kenya	29:54.31	SB
—	Kasey Knevelbaard	United States	DNF	PM
—	Davor Bienenfeld	Germany	DNF	PM
—	Benjámin Balázs	United States	DNF	PM

Pole vault
Place	Athlete	Nation	Height	Notes
1st place, gold medalist(s)	Armand Duplantis	Sweden	6.00 m	
2nd place, silver medalist(s)	Sam Kendricks	United States	5.80 m	
3rd place, bronze medalist(s)	Austin Miller	United States	5.80 m	
4	Keaton Daniel	United States	5.60 m	
5	KC Lightfoot	United States	5.60 m	
6	Matt Ludwig	United States	5.60 m	
—	Renaud Lavillenie	France	NM	

Discus throw
Place	Athlete	Nation	Distance	Notes
1st place, gold medalist(s)	Mykolas Alekna	Lithuania	70.97 m	
2nd place, silver medalist(s)	Ralford Mullings	Jamaica	68.98 m	
3rd place, bronze medalist(s)	Daniel Ståhl	Sweden	68.59 m	
4	Rojé Stona	Jamaica	65.62 m	
5	Sam Mattis	United States	65.06 m	
6	Andrew Evans	United States	63.96 m	
7	Reginald Jagers III	United States	56.79 m	

Hammer throw
Place	Athlete	Nation	Distance	Notes
1st place, gold medalist(s)	Rudy Winkler	United States	83.16 m	DLR, NR, WL
2nd place, silver medalist(s)	Ethan Katzberg	Canada	81.73 m	
3rd place, bronze medalist(s)	Mykhaylo Kokhan	Ukraine	79.27 m	
4	Daniel Haugh	United States	78.55 m	SB
5	Wojciech Nowicki	Poland	77.03 m	SB
6	Denzel Comenentia	Netherlands	76.51 m	
7	Rowan Hamilton	Canada	76.36 m	SB
8	Tarik Robinson-O'Hagan	United States	75.08 m	

=== Women's ===
400 metres
Place	Athlete	Nation	Time	Notes
1st place, gold medalist(s)	Sydney McLaughlin-Levrone	United States	49.43	SB
2nd place, silver medalist(s)	Aaliyah Butler	United States	49.86	
3rd place, bronze medalist(s)	Isabella Whittaker	United States	50.81	
4	Rhasidat Adeleke	Ireland	51.33	
5	Dejanea Oakley	Jamaica	51.45	
6	Rosey Effiong	United States	51.62	
7	Bailey Lear	United States	51.83	

100 metres hurdles
Place	Athlete	Nation	Time	Notes
1st place, gold medalist(s)	Ackera Nugent	Jamaica	12.32	
2nd place, silver medalist(s)	Tobi Amusan	Nigeria	12.38	
3rd place, bronze medalist(s)	Kendra Harrison	United States	12.50 [.492]	
4	Masai Russell	United States	12.50 [.494]	
5	Danielle Williams	Jamaica	12.51	
6	Tonea Marshall	United States	12.57	
7	Aaliyah McCormick	United States	12.98	
—	Alia Armstrong	United States	DNF	
—	Tia Jones	United States	DNF	
			Wind: (+0.4 m/s)	

Hammer throw
Place	Athlete	Nation	Distance	Notes
1st place, gold medalist(s)	Camryn Rogers	Canada	78.88 m	DLR, NR
2nd place, silver medalist(s)	Brooke Andersen	United States	76.95 m	
3rd place, bronze medalist(s)	DeAnna Price	United States	75.35 m	
4	Anita Włodarczyk	Poland	74.70 m	SB
5	Janee' Kassanavoid	United States	74.18 m	
6	Annette Echikunwoke	United States	72.77 m	
7	Rachel Richeson	United States	72.30 m	

== See also ==
- 2025 Diamond League
