= Charles Rotich =

Kenyan long-distance runner (born 2005)

Personal information
- National team: Kenyan
- Born: 14 May 2005 (age 21)

Sport
- Country: Kenya
- Sport: Athletics
- Event: long-distance running

Achievements and titles
- Personal best(s): 3000 m: 7:58.26 (2024); 5000 m: 13:26.52 (2024); Road; 5km: 13:39 (2025); 10km: 27:18 (2024); Half Marathon: 1:01:39 (2025)
Medal record
Men's athletics
Representing Kenya
World Cross Country Championships
Gold medal – first place	2024 Belgrade	Junior team

Charles Rotich (born 14 May 2005) is a Kenyan long distance and cross country runner. He was a gold medalist at the 2024 World Athletics Cross Country Championships in the junior team event.

== Career ==
Rotich is from Rift Valley Province, and won the Kenyan U18 Cross Country title in January 2022.

He finished sixth at the 2024 World Athletics Cross Country Championships U20 race in Belgrade in March 2024, winning the gold medal in the team event. On 20 April 2024, he finished third in the 5000 metres at the Kip Keino Classic in Nairobi in a time of 13:39.16.

In February 2025, he finished third at the Almond Blossom Cross Country on the World Athletics Cross Country Tour. He finished fifth in the 5000 metres at the Kip Keino Classic in May 2025, running 13:41.83.

In February 2026, he placed third at the Almond Blossom Cross Country race, on the World Athletics Cross Country Tour in Albufeira, Portugal, finishing behind Rodrigue Kwizera and Oscar Chelimo.
