= Sheila Jebet =

Kenyan track and field athlete (born 2005)

Personal information
- Born: 31 December 2005 (age 20)

Sport
- Sport: Athletics
- Event: Long-distance running
Medal record
Women's athletics
Representing Kenya
World Cross Country Championships
Silver medal – second place	2024 Belgrade	U20 team

Sheila Jebet (born 31 December 2005) is a Kenyan long-distance and cross country runner.

== Biography ==
=== 2024 ===
In March 2024, she won the U20 Kenyan Cross Country Championships in Ruiru, Kiambu County. On 30 March 2024, she finished fourth in the U20 individual event, and won the silver medal in the team U20 race, at the 2024 World Athletics Cross Country Championships in Serbia. She was selected for the 5000 metres at the 2024 World Athletics U20 Championships in Lima, Peru, placing fourth overall.

She travelled to Europe for the conclusion of the 2024–25 World Athletics Cross Country Tour. She finished second to Charity Cherop at the Cardiff Cross Country Challenge in November 2024, a World Athletics Cross Country Tour Gold race. Later that month, she finished runner-up at the Cinque Mulini in Italy.

=== 2025 ===
She won the World Cross Country Tour Gold event in Hannut, Belgium, in January 2025. She finished third in the overall World Cross Country Tour 2024-25 standings, behind Italian Nadia Battocletti and Burundi's Francine Niyomukunzi.

On 8 November, she was runner-up at the women's 6 km race at the Cardiff Cross Challenge in Wales, a gold race part of the World Athletics Cross Country Tour, finishing behind compatriot Cynthia Chepkirui. The following week she was runner-up at the Cross Internacional de Soria, and then runner-up at the Cross de Atapuerca in Spain on 23 November.

=== 2026 ===
In January 2026, she was runner-up to Jana Van Lent at the Lotto Cross Cup de Hannut in Belgium. Jebet finished in third place overall in the 2025-26 World Athletics Cross Country Tour standings.
