= Dorcus Chepkwemoi =

Kenyan long-distance runner

Personal information
- Full name: Dorcus Chepkwemoi Ndiema
- Born: 5 December 2006 (age 19)

Sport
- Sport: Athletics
- Events: Long-distance running, Cross country running

Achievements and titles
- Personal bests: 5000m: 15:41.57 (2025); 10k (road): 34:15 (2026)

Dorcus Chepkwemoi Ndiema (born 5 December 2006) is a Kenyan long-distance and cross country runner.

== Biography ==
Based in Kaptagat, she is coached by Patrick Sang. Having transitioned into the senior ranks from under-20 races, Chepkwemoi finished in fourth place overall in the 2025-26 World Athletics Cross Country Tour standings. Her performances included winning the Cross Country Tour Gold meeting in Eldoret in December 2025, The Great Chepsaita Cross Country, finishing 24 seconds ahead of fellow Kenyan Brenda Jepchirchir for her first senior career major cross country victory. She also won the Cross Internacional de Venta de Baños in December 2025 in Spain, and the Cross Internacional de Amurrio on 30 December 2025. Chepkwemoi placed third over 5000 metres in 15:55.29 at the Kip Keino Classic in Nairobi in April 2026.

In October 2026, she placed fourth at the Cross Zornotza in Amorebieta, Spain.
