= 2024 World Athletics Cross Country Championships – U20 men's race =

U20 men's race at the 2024 World Athletics Cross Country Championships
- Organisers: World Athletics
- Edition: 45th
- Date: 30 March 2024
- Host city: Belgrade, Serbia
- Events: 1
- Distances: 8 km – U20 men
- Participation: 91 athletes from 24 nations

The U20 men's race at the 2024 World Athletics Cross Country Championships was held in Belgrade, Serbia on 30 March 2024, at 11:25 AM local time. Samuel Kibathi won the individual race, one second ahead of Mezgebu Sime.

== Race results ==
=== U20 men's race (8 km) ===
==== Individual ====
Men's Cross Country U20 Race
Place	Athlete	Age	Country	Time
1st place, gold medalist(s)	Samuel Kibathi	19	Kenya	22:40
2nd place, silver medalist(s)	Mezgebu Sime	18	Ethiopia	22:41
3rd place, bronze medalist(s)	Matthew Kipkoech Kipruto	18	Kenya	22:46
4	Yismaw Dillu	18	Ethiopia	22:48
5	Johana Erot	18	Kenya	22:49
6	Charles Rotich	18	Kenya	22:51
7	Sewmehon Anteneh	17	Ethiopia	22:52
8	Jenberu Sisay	18	Ethiopia	23:00
9	Shadrack Rono Kipkemei	18	Kenya	23:02
10	Abdisa Fayisa	18	Ethiopia	23:16
11	Simba Samuel Cherop	17	Uganda	23:23
12	Dolphine Chelimo	18	Uganda	23:25
13	Abel Bekele	18	Ethiopia	23:33
14	Sailas Rotich	18	Uganda	23:36
15	Hosea Chemutai	17	Uganda	23:47
16	Tomoya Inoue	17	Japan	23:58
17	Osama Er-Radouani	16	Morocco	24:07
18	Titus Musau	17	Uganda	24:16
19	Kaito Matsui	18	Japan	24:21
20	Sota Orita	18	Japan	24:25
21	Gaston Rohmer	18	France	24:28
22	Yamato Hamaguchi	17	Japan	24:29
23	Rico Leijenaar	18	South Africa	24:30
24	Kevin Sanchez	18	United States	24:31
25	Zenzile Pheko	18	South Africa	24:39
26	Yobiel Weldrufael	18	Eritrea	24:41
27	Musawenkosi Mnisi	18	South Africa	24:44
28	Ilyas Aaourdou	18	Morocco	24:46
29	Ahmed Faris	18	Morocco	24:48
30	Kole Mathison	19	United States	24:49
31	Quinn Miell-Ingram	17	Great Britain	24:50
32	Mesfin Escamilla	18	Spain	24:54
33	Oscar Gaitan	18	Spain	24:57
34	Jack Coomber	18	Australia	24:58
35	Craig Shennan	17	Great Britain	24:59
36	Unai Naranjo	18	Spain	25:00
37	Charlie Moore	18	Australia	25:04
38	Ishak Dahmani	19	France	25:08
39	Corné de Fouw	18	South Africa	25:12
40	Abdelwahed Aachour	18	Morocco	25:14
41	Nao Nanatsue	18	Japan	25:14
42	Tseko Piet Thobala	18	South Africa	25:14
43	Karl Ottfalk	18	Sweden	25:17
44	Ky Hehir	17	Australia	25:20
45	Noah Breker	19	United States	25:22
46	Ian McAllister	18	Canada	25:25
47	James Dargan	18	Great Britain	25:25
48	Matt Hill	19	New Zealand	25:30
49	Elliott Pugh	18	New Zealand	25:36
50	Aldin Ćatović	16	Serbia	25:37
51	Logan Tickell	17	Australia	25:39
52	Victor Daniel Perez Igari	19	Mexico	25:40
53	Padraig Heffernan	18	Australia	25:42
54	Aidan Jones	18	United States	25:48
55	Harry Colbert	19	Ireland	25:48
56	Khenny Porfirio Meneses	17	Peru	25:48
57	Tristan Douche	18	France	25:50
58	Gonçalo José Sousa	19	Spain	25:51
59	Zouhair Redouane	19	Morocco	25:55
60	Seth Mahony	18	Australia	25:59
61	Realeboga Smith	17	South Africa	26:00
62	Henry Dover	18	Great Britain	26:00
63	Angel Luis Reyes Ramirez	18	Mexico	26:02
64	Etienne le Roux	17	France	26:03
65	Tetsu Sasaki	17	Japan	26:03
66	Daniel Prescott	18	New Zealand	26:07
67	Carlos Zarate	18	Spain	26:07
68	Birhanu Harriman	18	United States	26:13
69	Kamran Brar	18	Canada	26:16
70	Seamus Robinson	19	Ireland	26:18
71	George Wyllie	16	New Zealand	26:25
72	Lorcan Rabbitte	19	New Zealand	26:28
73	Charles Gendron-Jetté	18	Canada	26:34
74	Brayan Huanca	17	Peru	26:39
75	Dylan Carrasco	18	Colombia	26:43
76	Elliot Bélanger	18	Canada	26:47
77	Sergej Kostić	15	Serbia	26:49
78	Theo Penard	18	France	26:52
79	Angus Skinner	19	Canada	27:02
80	Andres Lara	17	Spain	27:05
81	Azrael Cabusao	18	New Zealand	27:08
82	Léo Bédard	18	Canada	27:18
83	Hugh Kent	18	Guam	27:21
84	Veljko Vasiljević	18	Serbia	27:46
85	Luis Huaman	18	Peru	28:34
86	Nurdaulet Medeubayev	18	Kazakhstan	28:39
87	Weng Tou Ip	17	Macau	28:43
88	Kabir Ziljkić	17	Serbia	29:18
89	Ivan Goncharov	18	Kazakhstan	29:51
	Aibol Omar	18	Kazakhstan	DNF
	Berkley Nance	18	United States	DNF
	Mahmoud Abou Zeid	16	Lebanon	DNS

==== Team ====
Despite only starting five out of the allowable six runners, Kenya won the team race. The teams were scored by the sum of the top four runners' placings, with ties being broken on the fifth runner's position.

Rank	Team	Score
1st place, gold medalist(s)	Kenya	15
2nd place, silver medalist(s)	Ethiopia	21
3rd place, bronze medalist(s)	Uganda	52
4	Japan	77
5	South Africa	114
6	Morocco	114
7	United States	153
8	Spain	159
9	Australia	166
10	United Kingdom	175
11	France	180
12	New Zealand	234
13	Canada	264
14	Serbia	299
