= Matthew Kipkoech Kipruto =

Kenyan long-distance runner (born 2005)

Personal information
- Born: 24 August 2005 (age 21)

Sport
- Sport: Athletics
- Events: Long distance running, Cross country running
Medal record
Men's athletics
Representing Kenya
World Cross Country Championships
| Gold medal – first place | 2024 Belgrade | Junior team |
| Bronze medal – third place | 2024 Belgrade | Junior race |

Matthew Kipkoech Kipruto (born 24 August 2005) is a Kenyan long-distance runner and cross country runner.

== Biography ==
He won a bronze medal in the U20 individual, and gold in the U20 team event at the 2024 World Athletics Cross Country Championships in Belgrade. He placed third at The Great Chepsaita Cross Country race in 2024.

He competed in Europe during the 2024–25 World Athletics Cross Country Tour, winning the Festival du Cross in France and the Cinque Mulini in Italy in November 2024. He won the Barcelona 5 km road race on 31 December 2024. He finished second in the overall World Cross Country Tour 2024-25 standings, behind Burundi's Rodrigue Kwizera.

On 16 November 2025, he placed third at the Cross Internacional de Soria, in Spain. He was runner-up at the Cinque Mulini in November 2025, the World Athletics Cross Country Tour Gold meeting in San Vittore Olona, Italy. In December, with his world cross country ranking up to third, he won The Great Chepsaita Cross Country in Eldoret. He finished in fourth place overall in the 2025-26 World Athletics Cross Country Tour standings.
