= World Athletics Cross Country Tour =

- Current season, competition or edition: 2023–24 World Athletics Cross Country Tour
- Sport: Cross country running
- Founded: 2021
- Continent: Europe, Africa, North America
- Official website: Cross Country Tour

The World Athletics Cross Country Tour is an annual series of cross country running competitions which are recognised by the World Athletics (formerly known as the IAAF). Athletes accumulate points in the series' cross country meets during the season, which typically begins in September and finishes in March, with top three performances counting towards the standings. The inaugural season was 2021–22. The Tour replaced the IAAF Cross Country Permit series, which was first held in 1999.

Starting with the 2023 World Athletics Championships, the Cross Country Tour and the cross country rankings form part of the qualification pathway for the 10,000 metres event at championships and Olympics. The top eight men and top eight women in the cross country rankings, who are not already qualified via entry standard or world 10,000 m ranking, are automatically qualified.

The Cross Country Tour is divided into three levels – Gold, Silver and Bronze.

== Editions ==
World Athletics Cross Country Tour editions
| Ed. | Season | Start date | End date | Meets | Gold | Silver | Bronze | Ref. |
|---|---|---|---|---|---|---|---|---|
| 1 | 2021–22 | 25 September 2021 | 6 March 2022 | 22 | 15 | 3 | 4 | |
| 2 | 2022–23 | 24 September 2022 | 26 February 2023 | 24 | 17 | 5 | 2 | |
| 3 | 2023–24 | 23 September 2023 | 16 March 2024 | 26 | 13 | 7 | 6 | |
| 4 | 2024–25 | 28 September 2024 | 2 March 2025 | 28 | 16 | 8 | 4 | |

== Gold standard meetings ==
Gold standard meetings
| # | Meeting | City | Country | 2021–22 | 2022–23 |
|---|---|---|---|---|---|
| 1 | Cardiff Cross Challenge | Cardiff | United Kingdom | 1 | 1 |
| 2 | Cross Internacional Zornotza | Amorebieta-Etxano | Spain | 2 | 3 |
| 3 | Cross Internacional de Soria | Soria | Spain | 3 | 4 |
| 4 | Cross de Atapuerca | Atapuerca | Spain | 4 | 5 |
| 5 | Cross Internacional de Itálica | Seville | Spain | 5 | 6 |
| 6 | Cross Internacional de la Constitución | Alcobendas | Spain | 6 | 7 |
| 7 | Cross Champs | Walnut, CA / Austin, TX | United States | 7 | 8 |
| 8 | Cross Internacional de Venta de Baños | Venta de Baños | Spain | 8 | 9 |
| 9 | Campaccio | San Giorgio su Legnano | Italy | 9 | 10 |
| 10 | Juan Muguerza Cross-Country | Elgoibar | Spain | 10 | 11 |
| 11 | Cinque Mulini | San Vittore Olona | Italy | 11 | 12 |
| 12 | Sirikwa Cross Country Classic | Eldoret | Kenya | 12 | 16 |
| 13 | Cross Cup de Hannut | Hannut | Belgium | 13 | 13 |
| 14 | Almond Blossom Cross Country | Albufeira | Portugal | 14 | 17 |
| 15 | Gran Premio Cáceres Campo a Través | Serradilla / Calzadilla | Spain | 15 | 15 |
| 16 | Cross Country Bydgoszcz na Start | Bydgoszcz | Poland | — | 2 |
| 17 | Botswana Cross-Country Challenge | Gaborone | Botswana | — | 14 |
| 18 | Cross international Le Maine Libre-Allonnes-Sarthe | Allonnes | France | — | — |
| 19 | Festival du Cross-Country | Carhaix | France | — | — |
| 20 | The Great Chepsaita Cross Country | Eldoret | Kenya | — | — |

The number in the table represents the order in which the meeting took place.

== Winners ==
=== Men ===
| Season | First | | Second | | Third | |
|---|---|---|---|---|---|---|
| 2021–22 | Rodrigue Kwizera (BDI) | 3840 pts | Nibret Melak (ETH) | 3780 pts | Aron Kifle (ERI) | 3760 pts |
| 2022–23 | Rodrigue Kwizera (BDI); Thierry Ndikumwenayo (BDI); Yann Schrub (FRA) | 3720 pts | — | | — | |

=== Women ===
| Season | First | | Second | | Third | |
|---|---|---|---|---|---|---|
| 2021–22 | Rahel Daniel (ERI) | 3820 pts | Lucy Mawia (KEN) | 3780 pts | Beatrice Chebet (KEN); Likina Amebaw (ETH) | 3780 pts |
| 2022–23 | Rahel Daniel (ERI); Lucy Mawia (KEN) | 3720 pts | — | | Isabel Barreiro (ESP) | 3620 pts |
