= Mezgebu =

Mezgebu is a given name and surname. Notable people with the name include:

- Assefa Mezgebu (born 1978), Ethiopian long-distance runner
- Ayele Mezgebu (born 1973), Ethiopian long-distance runner
- Mezgebu Sime (born 2005), Ethiopian long distance runner
