= Yenenesh Shimeket =

Ethiopian track and field athlete (born 2007)

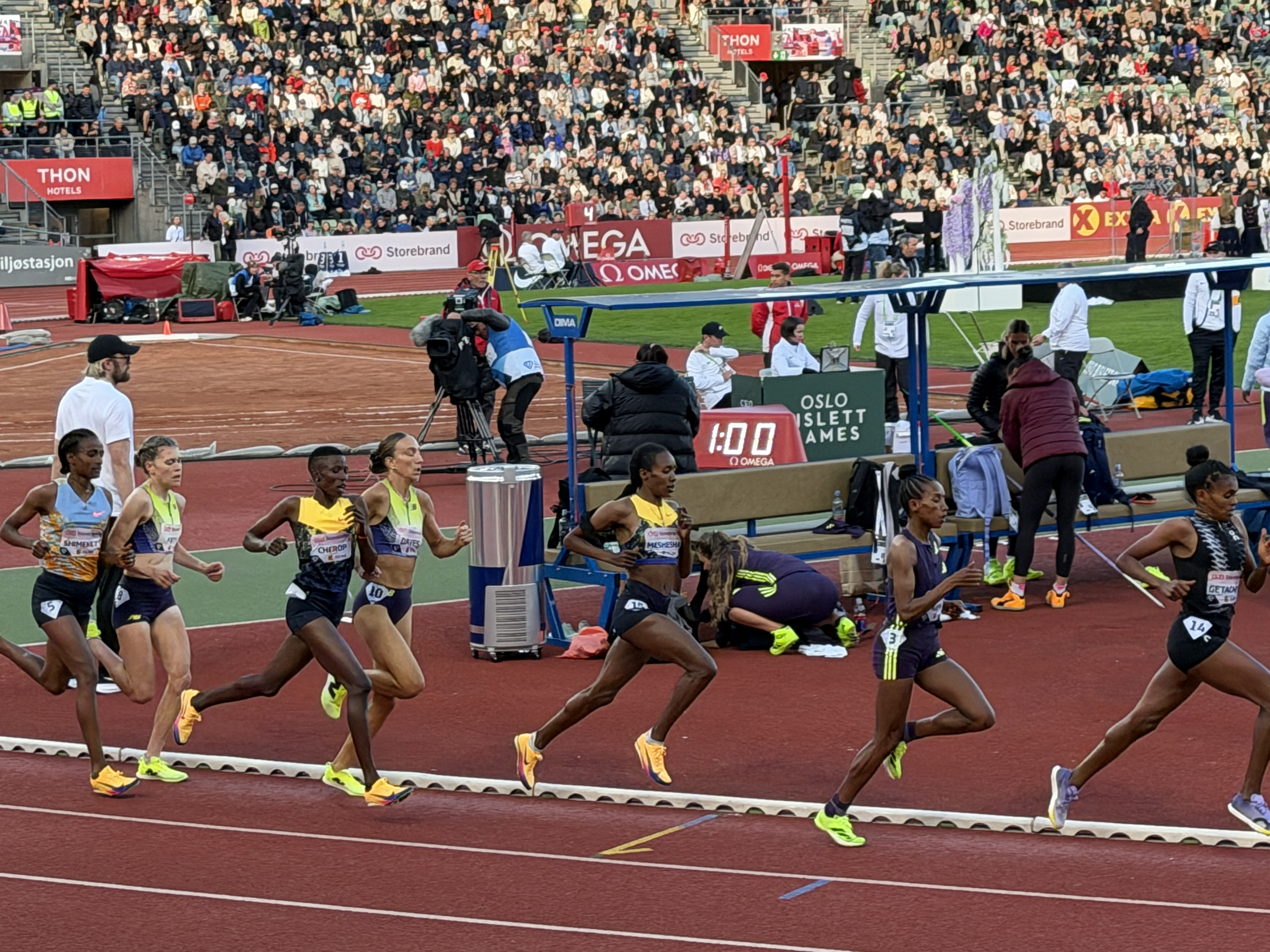
- Shimeket at the 2026 Bislett Games

Personal information
- Nationality: Ethiopian
- Born: 9 February 2007 (age 19)

Sport
- Country: Ethiopia
- Sport: Athletics
- Events: Long-distance running, Cross Country running

Yenenesh Shimeket (born 9 February 2007) is an Ethiopian long-distance and cross country runner.

== Biography ==
Yenenesh Shimeket won the silver medal in the U20 race at the 2024 African Cross Country Championships in Hammamet, Tunisia, placing behind her Ethiopian compatriot Robe Dida.

Shimeket competed in Europe during the 2024–25 World Athletics Cross Country Tour, winning the Festival du Cross in France and the Cinque Mulini in Italy in November 2024 at the age of 17 years-old, finishing ahead of Sheila Jebet and Nadia Battocletti. She was runner-up to Jebet the World Cross Country Tour Gold event in Hannut, Belgium, in January 2025. She also won the International La Mandria Cross that month, another race on the 2024-25 World Athletics Cross Country Tour, and placed seventh overall in the final Tour positions.

Shimeket ran a personal best 8:32.01 to place fifth in the 3000 metres at the 2025 Meeting International Mohammed VI d'Athlétisme de Rabat, part of the 2025 Diamond League, in May 2025. That month, she ran 15:51.75 to have a top-ten finish over 5000 metres at the Kip Keino Classic.

Shimeket retained her title at the Cinque Mulini in November 2025, World Athletics Cross Country Tour Gold meeting in San Vittore Olona, Italy.

Shimeket was selected for the Ethiopian team to compete at the 2026 World Athletics Cross Country Championships, placing fifth in the under-20 race. On 4 April 2026, she finished third behind compatriot Marta Alemayo and Hawi Abera in 14:24 in the women's 5km at the Urban Trail de Lille in France, to move into the top-ten of the world all-time list. In May, she ran a personal best 14:48.02 for the 5000 m at the 2026 Shanghai Diamond League. In November, she placed fourth at the Cross Internacional de Itálica in Seville.
