= 2024 World Athletics Cross Country Championships =

45th World Athletics Cross Country Championships
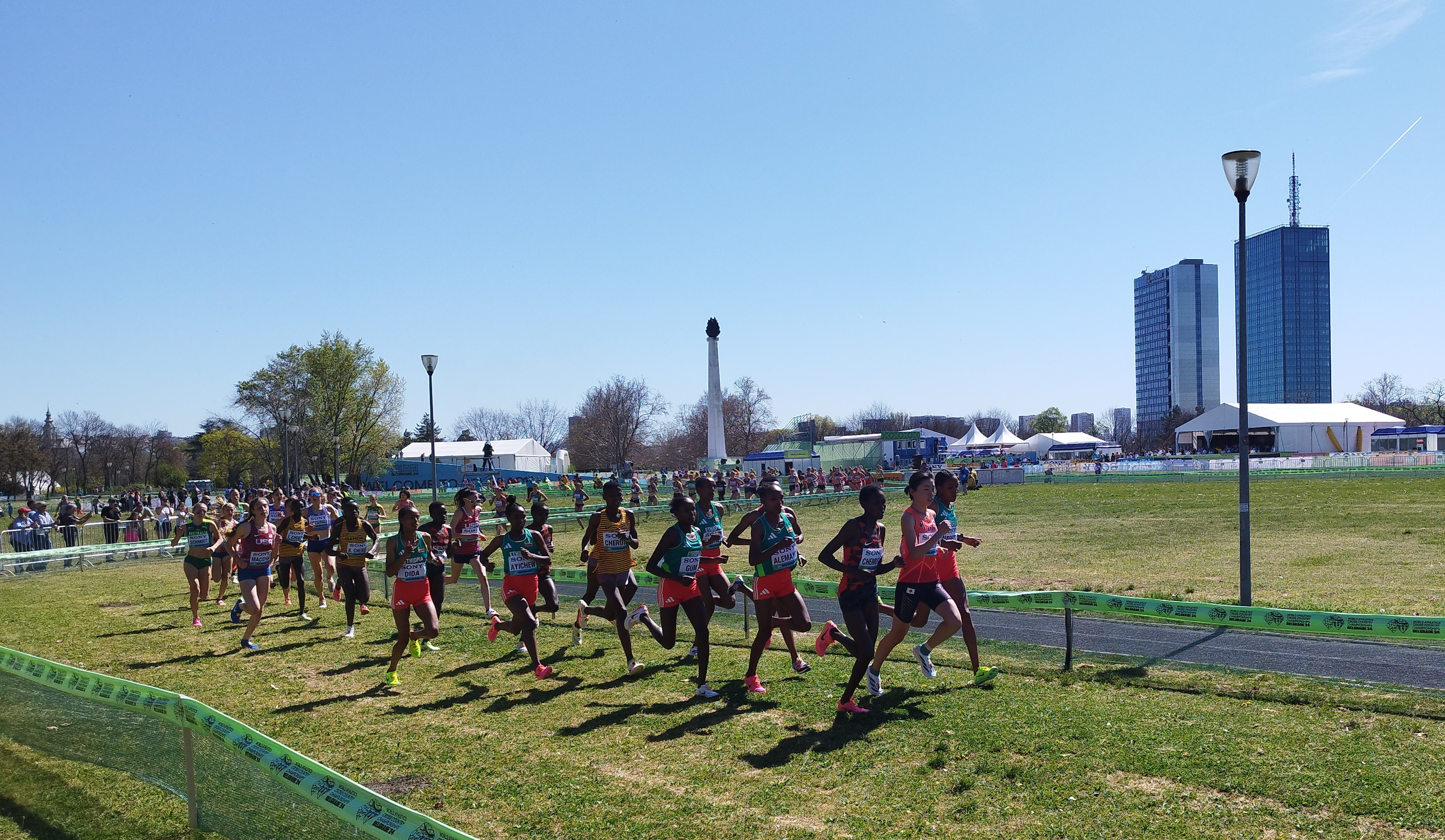
- Runners during an event at the Games
- Organisers: World Athletics
- Edition: 45th
- Date: 30 March
- Host city: Belgrade, Serbia
- Venue: Park of Friendship
- Events: 5
- Distances: 10 km (Men and Women); 8 km (Under 20 men); 6 km (Under 20 women); 4 × 2 km relay (Mixed)
- Participation: 485 athletes from 51 nations
- Official website: Belgrade 2024

The 2024 World Athletics Cross Country Championships was the 45th edition of the World Athletics Cross Country Championships held on 30 March 2024 in Belgrade, Serbia. It was held in the Park of Friendship, located next to the Danube River. Originally planned to be held in Medulin and Pula in Croatia in February 2024, the World Athletics announced in September 2023 that event would be moved to Belgrade. Belgrade has previously hosted the 2013 European Cross Country Championships, and recently hosted the 2022 World Athletics Indoor Championships.

The Championships consisted of five events– the 10 km main races for men and women, 8 km and 6 km races for under-20 men and women respectively, and a 4 x 2 km mixed relay. About 485 athletes from 51 nations participated in the events. There were nine sets of medals that were awarded across the five events. Kenya topped the medal table with 11 medals including six gold medals.

== Background ==
The inaugural World Cross Country Championships was held at the Hippodroom Waregem in Waregem, Belgium in March 1973. The International Amateur Athletic Federation invited 150 nations, of which 21 nations competed in the 1973 IAAF World Cross Country Championships across three events (senior men and women, junior men). The junior women's category was introduced for the first time in the 1989 event held at Stavanger, Norway. Since the inaugural edition, it was held as an annual event, with an increasing number of nations participating in it. In the 2000 World Championships held at Vilamoura in Portugal, 76 nations participated in six events. For the first time since its inception, there was no global level championship for cross country running in 2012 and the IAAF announced that the World Cross Country Championships would become a biennial format from theron. The event was not held in 2021 due to COVID-19 pandemic, and a virtual event was held in its place. While initially postponed to September 2021 and later to 2022, it was not held due to travel restrictions. The event returned in 2023, and was hosted in Bathurst, Australia. The championships were once again delayed to 2023 in September 2021, due to Australian travel restrictions.

== Host and venue ==
The event was originally planned to be held in Medulin and Pula in Croatia in February 2024. However, due to lack of preparations, on the 15th of September 2023, it was announced by World Athletics that the event is to be moved to an undisclosed new venue. On 27 September 2023, World Athletics awarded the hosting rights to Belgrade. Belgrade has previously hosted the 2013 European Cross Country Championships, and recently hosted multi-nation events such as 2017 European Athletics Indoor Championships, 2017 Balkan Championships, and 2022 World Athletics Indoor Championships.

The event was held in the Park of Friendship, located next to the Sava and Danube rivers. The main course consisted of a 1.887 km (1.173 mi) loop, with 0.27 km (0.17 mi) and 0.32 km (0.20 mi) start and finish straights respectively. The event was held on a predominantly grass terrain covered with dirt and sand.

== Events and schedule ==
The 45th edition of the World Athletics Cross Country Championships was held on 30 March 2024. The schedule consisted of five events– 10 km men and women, 8 km under-20 men, 6 km under-20 women, and 4 x 2 km mixed relay. In each of the races, each nation was allowed to field a maximum of up to six athletes. The mixed relay team consisted of teams of two women and two men each running one loop of the course in a specified order, starting with a male and alternating between genders. Athletes were to carry a wristband that was to be transferred to the next athlete within the takeover zone.

Schedule
Date	Time (CET)	Events
30 March	11:00	U20 race women
30 March	11:35	U20 race men
30 March	12:15	Mixed Relay
30 March	12:45	Senior race women
30 March	13:30	Senior race men

== Prizes ==
Nine sets of medals were awarded to the competitors across the five events. Apart from the medals awarded to the top three finishers in the individual categories, medals were also awarded to the best teams. Any nation required a minimum of four athletes competing in a single event to be eligible for the team medals. In case of more than four participants, the times of top four athletes on each team were counted towards the race result. Apart from the medals, the top six finishers in individual senior events, and top four teams from the relay event were also awarded prize money. The individual winners were awarded US$30,000 while the top teams won US$20,000. The top relay team was awarded US$12,000 in prize money.

=== Medal table ===
Four nations won medals in the competition. Kenya topped the medal table with 11 medals including six gold medals.

* Host nation (Serbia)

Rank	Nation	Gold	Silver	Bronze	Total
1	Kenya	6	2	3	11
2	Ethiopia	2	6	2	10
3	Uganda	1	1	3	5
4	Great Britain	0	0	1	1
Totals (4 entries)		9	9	9	27

- Note: Totals include both individual and team medals, with medals in the team competition counting as one medal.

== Participation ==
About 485 athletes from 51 countries participated in the Games. Competitors included the defending senior men's and women's champions Jacob Kiplimo of Uganda and Beatrice Chebet of Kenya respectively.

- Afghanistan (1)
- Argentina (1)
- Athlete Refugee Team (4)
- Australia (20)
- Bulgaria (1)
- Burundi (9)
- Canada (28)
- Central African Republic (1)
- Colombia (5)
- Cook Islands (1)
- DR Congo (1)
- Ecuador (2)
- Eritrea (7)
- Estonia (3)
- Ethiopia (33)
- Fiji (7)
- France (20)
- Great Britain (33)
- Guam (1)
- Honduras (1)
- Hong Kong (2)
- India (6)
- Ireland (8)
- Japan (24)
- Kazakhstan (14)
- Kenya (30)
- Kyrgyzstan (1)
- Lebanon (14)
- Macau (2)
- Mexico (10)
- Montenegro (2)
- Morocco (14)
- Netherlands (1)
- New Zealand (18)
- Northern Mariana Islands (1)
- Norway (1)
- Palestine (1)
- Peru (13)
- Rwanda (4)
- Serbia (13)
- Seychelles (1)
- Singapore (5)
- South Africa (28)
- Spain (19)
- Sweden (2)
- Tajikistan (2)
- Tanzania (12)
- Uganda (27)
- United States (33)
- Uruguay (1)
- Zimbabwe (2)

== Results ==
In the men's race, Chimdessa Debele of Ethiopia led during the initial laps from France's Mehdi Frere while most of the other athletes were part of one large chasing pack. While the initial leaders were caught by the chasing pack, Kenya's Gideon Rono mounted a solo attack, which was soon mitigated by the main pack. In the 24th minute of the race, Jacob Kiplimo and Berihu Aregawi made their moves to lead ahead of the pack. Kiplimo and Aregawi finished in first and second, replicating their performance from the previous edition. Benson Kiplangat of Kenya won the bronze, while the third-place finisher from the last edition, Joshua Cheptegei, finished sixth. In the team contest, Uganda and Kenya were level on points in the third lap. However, Kenya inched ahead, and won the gold as five Kenyans finished in the top eight places.

In the women's event, the Kenyan team of Agnes Jebet Ngetich, Beatrice Chebet, Emmaculate Anyango, Lilian Kasait Rengeruk, and Margaret Kipkemboi led from the front since the start with Uganda's Joy Cheptoyek and USA's Weini Kelati Frezghi trying to keep up with the leaders. By the second lap, only Uganda's Sarah Chelangat and Kazakhstan's Daisy Jepkemei were close to the Kenyan group. While Anyango and Ngetich dropped back, it was down to Chebet, Rengeruk and Kipkemboi for the race win. Chetbet won and successfully defended her title, followed by Rengeruk and Kipkemboi in second and third respectively. It was just the fifth time in history that both the senior men's and women's champions have retained their titles at the World Cross Country Championships. Kenya also took the women's team title. Kenya also won the mixed relay event.

Event	Gold		Silver		Bronze	
Individual
Senior men	Jacob Kiplimo; Uganda	28:09	Berihu Aregawi; Ethiopia	28:12	Benson Kiplangat; Kenya	28:14
Senior women	Beatrice Chebet; Kenya	31:05	Lilian Kasait Rengeruk; Kenya	31:08	Margaret Kipkemboi; Kenya	31:09
U20 men	Samuel Kibathi; Kenya	22:40	Mezgebu Sime; Ethiopia	22:41	Matthew Kipkoech Kipruto; Kenya	22:46
U20 women	Marta Alemayo; Ethiopia	19:28	Asayech Ayichew; Ethiopia	19:32	Robe Dida; Ethiopia	19:38
Team
Senior men	Kenya: Benson Kiplangat (3); Nicholas Kipkorir (4); Samwel Chebolei Masai (5); Sabastian Sawe (7); Gideon Kipkertich Rono ~~(8)~~; Ishmael Rokitto Kipkurui ~~(DNF)~~	19 pts	Uganda: Jacob Kiplimo (1); Joshua Cheptegei (6); Dan Kibet (11); Hosea Kiplangat (13); Martin Magengo Kiprotich ~~(14)~~; Leonard Chemutai ~~(18)~~	31 pts	Ethiopia: Berihu Aregawi (2); Boki Diriba (10); Tadese Worku (12); Chimdessa Debele (16); Berehanu Tsegu ~~(19)~~; Getachew Masresha ~~(26)~~	40 pts
Senior women	Kenya: Beatrice Chebet (1); Lilian Kasait Rengeruk (2); Margaret Kipkemboi (3); Agnes Jebet Ngetich ~~(4)~~; Cintia Chepngeno ~~(16)~~; Emmaculate Anyango(DQ)	10 pts	Ethiopia: Bertukan Welde (7); Mebrat Gidey (9); Tadelech Bekele (10); Sisay Meseret Gola (11); Girmawit Gebrzihair ~~(20)~~; Bekelech Teku ~~(24)~~	41 pts	Uganda: Sarah Chelangat (5); Loice Chekwemoi (8); Rachael Zena Chebet (12); Annet Chemengich Chelangat (15); Joy Cheptoyek ~~(17)~~; Belinda Chemutai ~~(18)~~	44 pts
U20 men	Kenya: Samuel Kibathi (1); Matthew Kipkoech Kipruto (3); Johana Erot (5); Charles Rotich (6); Shadrack Rono Kipkemei ~~(9)~~	15 pts	Ethiopia: Mezgebu Sime (2); Yismaw Dillu (4); Sewmehon Anteneh (7); Jenberu Sisay (8); Abdisa Fayisa ~~(10)~~; Abel Bekele ~~(13)~~	21 pts	Uganda: Simba Samuel Cherop (11); Dolphine Chelimo (12); Sailas Rotich (14); Hosea Chemutai ~~(15)~~; Titus Musai ~~(18)~~	52 pts
U20 women	Ethiopia: Marta Alemayo (1); Asayech Ayichew (2); Robe Dida (3); Yenawa Nbret (6); Lemlem Nibret ~~(8)~~; Shito Gumi ~~(9)~~	12 pts	Kenya: Sheila Jebet (4); Diana Cherotich (5); Deborah Chemutai (7); Mercy Chepkemoi ~~(12)~~	28 pts	Uganda: Nowel Cheruto (10); Charity Cherop (11); Keziah Chebet (13); Vicky Chekwemboi ~~(14)~~; Isella Chebet ~~(27)~~	48 pts
Relay
Mixed relay	Kenya: Reynold Kipkorir Cheruiyot; Virginia Nyambura; Kyumbe Munguti; Purity Chepkirui	22:15	Ethiopia: Taresa Tolosa; Dahdi Dube; Adehena Kasaye; Birri Abera	22:43	Great Britain: Thomas Keen; Alexandra Millard; Adam Fogg; Bethan Morley	23:00
