= 2022 African Championships in Athletics – Women's 5000 metres =

The women's 5000 metres event at the 2022 African Championships in Athletics was held on 9 June in Port Louis, Mauritius.

== Results ==
Rank	Athlete	Nationality	Time	Notes
1st place, gold medalist(s)	Beatrice Chebet	Kenya	15:00.82	CR
2nd place, silver medalist(s)	Fentaye Belayneh	Ethiopia	15:01.89	
3rd place, bronze medalist(s)	Caroline Nyaga	Kenya	15:05.34	
4	Melknat Wudu	Ethiopia	15:08.65	
5	Sarah Chelangat	Uganda	15:37.68	
6	Caster Semenya	South Africa	16:03.24	
7	Kyla Jacobs	South Africa	16:16.06	
8	Janat Chemusto	Uganda	16:38.76	
9	Belvia Boyfini	Central African Republic	19:15.02	
	Bijou Masirika	Democratic Republic of the Congo	DNS	
	Bertukan Welde	Ethiopia	DNS	
	Elvanie Nimbona	Burundi	DNS	
