= 2024 African Championships in Athletics – Women's 5000 metres =

Women's 5000 metres at the 2024 African Championships in Athletics
- Venue: Japoma Stadium
- Location: Douala, Cameroon
- Dates: 21 June
- Competitors: 7 from 4 nations
- Winning time: 15:30.10

Medalists
gold medal	Fantaye Belayneh	Uganda
silver medal	Kassie Wubrist	Ethiopia
bronze medal	Samia Hassan Nour	Djibouti

The women's 5000 metres event at the 2024 African Championships in Athletics was held on 21 June in Douala, Cameroon.

== Records ==
Records before the 2024 African Athletics Championships
Record	Athlete (nation)	Time (s)	Location	Date
World record	Gudaf Tsegay (ETH)	14:00.21	Eugene, United States	25 May 2024
African record	Gudaf Tsegay (ETH)	14:00.21	Eugene, United States	25 May 2024
Championship record	Sheila Chepkirui (KEN)	15:05.45	Durban, South Africa	23 June 2016
World leading	Tsigie Gebreselama (ETH)	14:18.76	Eugene, United States	25 May 2024
African leading	Tsigie Gebreselama (ETH)	14:18.76	Eugene, United States	25 May 2024

== Results ==
Rank	Athlete	Nationality	Time	Notes
1st place, gold medalist(s)	Fantaye Belayneh	Uganda	15:30.10	
2nd place, silver medalist(s)	Kassie Wubrist	Ethiopia	15:30.25	
3rd place, bronze medalist(s)	Samia Hassan Nour	Djibouti	15:42.63	
4	Rebecca Mwangi	Kenya	15:46.05	
5	Esther Chebet	Uganda	16:01.75	
6	Mercy Chepkemoi	Kenya	17:57.53	
7	Teresia Gateri	Kenya	18:02.21	

== See also ==
- Athletics at the 2023 African Games – Women's 5000 metres
