= Samuel Kibathi =

Kenyan athlete

Personal information
- Nationality: Kenyan
- Born: 23 February 2005 (age 21)

Sport
- Sport: Athletics
- Event: Cross Country running

Achievements and titles
- Personal best(s): 5000m: 13:12.28 (Hokkaido, 2024); 10000m: 27:01.70 (Tokyo, 2025)
Medal record
Representing Kenya
World Cross Country Championships
Gold medal – first place	2024 Belgrade	Junior team
Gold medal – first place	2024 Belgrade	Junior race
African U20 Championships
Bronze medal – third place	2023 Ndola	10000 m

Samuel Kibathi Wanjiru (born 23 February 2005) is a Kenyan long distance and cross country runner.

== Early life ==
Originally from Nyandarua County, he attended Kurashiki High School in Japan.

== Career ==
Kibathi won the 5000 metres Kenyan national U20 world championship trials in a time of 13:47.86 in July 2022. He finished sixth at the 2022 World Athletics U20 Championships over 5000 metres in Cali, Colombia in August 2022 after he fell close to the finish line.

At the start of 2023, he won the men's Under-20 8 km at the Kenyan National Cross Country Championships and the U20 race at the Sirikwa Cross Country Classic in Eldoret. He ran a personal best time of 13:36.02 over 5000 metres in Nairobi. He was a bronze medalist in the 10,000 metres at the 2023 African U18 and U20 Championships in Athletics in Ndola.

In 2024, he won the Kenyan U20 national cross country title and was subsequently selected for the 2024 World Athletics Cross Country Championships in Serbia. On 30 March 2024, he won gold in the U20 individual and in the team U20 race at the 2024 World Athletics Cross Country Championships in Serbia.
