= Allie Buchalski =

American distance runner (born 1995)

Personal information
- Born: January 12, 1995 (age 31) Johns Creek, Georgia, United States

Sport
- Country: United States
- College team: Furman University
- Club: Brooks Beasts

Achievements and titles
- Personal bests: Half marathon: 1:09:59; 5,000 meters: 14:57.54; 3,000 meters: 8:43.83; 1,500 meters: 4:05.53

Allie Buchalski (born January 12, 1995) is an American professional distance runner. She was an NCAA All-American at Furman University before she began competing professionally for Brooks. Buchalski qualified for the U.S. Olympic Trials in 2020 and 2024, and she was the USATF Club Cross Country National Champion in 2024.

== High school ==
Buchalski grew up in Johns Creek, Georgia and attended Johns Creek High School. There she won the state titles in cross country three times, as well as multiple state titles at 1,600 and 3,200 meters in outdoor track. Buchalski was named the Georgia Gatorade Runner of the Year in 2012. She recorded top times of 4:55 for 1,600 meters and 10:42 for 3,200 meters.

== College ==
She continued her running career at Furman University, where she became the program's first ever All-American in cross country and indoor track. Buchalski placed in the top ten twice in the NCAA Cross Country Championship (2015 and 2017). She also led the Furman program to a top ten team ranking during the 2017 cross country season.

On the track, Buchalski won numerous SEC championships and was the national runner-up for 5,000 meters in 2018. Her success came on the heels of the unexpected death of her father, Jim, which almost caused Buchalski to leave Furman to be closer to her family.

== Professional career ==
=== 2018–2022 ===
Shortly after graduating from Furman, Buchalski signed a professional contract with Brooks and moved to Seattle. She competed at the USA Track Championships at 5,000 meters in 2018 and 2019, placing seventh and 17th, respectively.

During the COVID-19 pandemic, Buchalski dealt with hip and knee injuries as well as some mental health struggles. Through rehab and visits to a sports psychologist she was able to recover in time for the 2021 track season.

She recorded a time of 14:57.54 for 5,000 meters in March 2021, which qualified her for the postponed 2020 United States Olympic trials (track and field). At the Olympic Trials, Buchalski advanced to the 5,000 meter final and placed fifth in a time of 15:47.52.

The following month, she shifted to the roads and placed eighth at the USA 6 km Championship. In 2022 on the indoor track, Buchalski placed tenth at the Millrose Games in the 3,000 meters with a time of 8:58.46. Later that year, she took tenth over 8 km at the Cross Champs event in Austin, Texas.

=== 2023–present ===
Buchalski stuck to the trails to begin 2023, as she finished seventh at the USA Cross Country Championship in Virginia. She was selected to represent the United States at the 2023 World Athletics Cross Country Championships in Australia, where she placed 33rd.

Over the summer of 2023, Buchalski claimed 11th in the 5,000 meters at the USA Track Championship. In 2024, she competed in both the 1,500 meters and 5,000 meters at the 2024 United States Olympic trials (track and field). Buchalski advanced to the 5,000 meter final where she finished sixth. She did not advance past the semifinals of the 1,500 meters. She closed 2024 by winning the USATF National Club Cross Country Championships in Tacoma, Washington.

In 2025, Buchalski shifted back to the roads where she grabbed fifth at the USA 5 km Championship in Indianapolis. She made her half marathon debut in the fall at the Philadelphia Distance Run, where she clocked a 1:09:59 to win the race by over one minute.

Buchalski placed third in the 10,000 meters at the 2026 USA Outdoor Track & Field Championships. On the roads she finished in the top 10 at the USA 5K Championship and the Beach to Beacon 10K.
