= Samwel Chebolei Masai =

Kenyan middle-distance runner

Samwel Masai
Personal information
- Nationality: Kenyan
- Born: Samwel Chebolei Masai; 20 March 2001 (age 25)

Sport
- Sport: Track and Field
Medal record
Men's athletics
Representing Kenya
World Cross Country Championships
Gold medal – first place	2024 Belgrade	Senior team
Bronze medal – third place	2019 Aarhus	U20 team

Samwel Chebolei Masai (born 20 March 2001) is a Kenyan middle-distance runner.

== Biography ==
In February, 2019 Chebole Masai won the national junior cross country 8 km title at the Eldoret Sports Club. He then competed for Kenya at the 2019 IAAF World Cross Country Championships in Aarhus, Denmark in March, 2019 finishing 8th in the junior category in a time of 24.19 in the individual race and contributing to the team's bronze in the team event.

He ran a new personal best in Hengelo on 8 June 2021 of 13:12.55 over 5000m. On June 19, 2021, he earned a spot on the Kenyan team for the 2020 Summer Games in the 5000m after finishing in the top 3 at the Kenyan Olympic trials in a time of 13:17.40. However, despite being on the start list of athletes he did not start his 5000m heat in Tokyo.

He finished fifth and won team gold with Kenya at the 2024 World Athletics Cross Country Championships. In December 2024, he won The Great Chepsaita Cross Country race in Kenya.

He competed over 5000 metres at the 2025 Shanghai Diamond League event in China on 3 May 2025. He ran a personal best 27:07.65 for the 10,000 metres at the 2025 Prefontaine Classic on 5 July.

In March 2026, he was runner-up at the Prague Half Marathon running 58:16 to finish behind a course-record setting Rodrigue Kwizera.
