= Brenda Jepchirchir =

Kenyan long-distance runner

Personal information
- Born: 10 July 2005 (age 21)

Sport
- Sport: Athletics
- Events: Long-distance running, Cross country running

Achievements and titles
- Personal bests: 1500m: 4:17.59 (Gainesville, 2025); 3000m: 8:57.49 (Kagoshima, 2023); 5000m: 15:33.50 (Jacksonville, 2025); 10,000m: 32:17.69 (Nairobi, 2026); Road; 10km: 29:26 (Valencia, 2026); Half marathon: 1:09:45 (Mainz, 2024)

Brenda Jepchirchir (born 10 July 2005) is a Kenyan long-distance and cross country runner.

== Biography ==
In May 2024, Jepchirchir took second with 69:45 on her half marathon debut in Mainz, Germany.

Competing in the United States collegiate system for Auburn University, she placed 21st the 2024 NCAA Cross Country Championships. She was named the Southeastern Conference's (SEC) Women's Freshman of the Week in January 2025 having run 9:08.37 in the 3000 metres at the Orange & Purple Invitational in Clemson, South Carolina, a freshman record for the school programme. She placed 14th over 10,000 metres at the 2025 NCAA Division I Outdoor Track and Field Championships in 32:41.66.

After leaving Auburn that summer she returned to Kenya and joined the Willy Langat coached training group that includes Janeth Chepngetich, in Keringet. Competing on the roads, she ran 31:50 in September 2025 in the 10k run in Belgrade and 31:10 in October at the tRUNsylvania 10K – a World Athletics Elite Label road race in Brasov. Jepchirchir then ran 30:04 for 10 km in Lille, France in November 2025. The following month, she placed second to compatriot Dorcus Chepkwemoi at the Great Chepsaita Cross Country championships, held in Uasin Gishu County. She moved to fourth on the world all-time list with her time of 29:25 over 10 km in Valencia, Spain, on 11 January 2026, winning ahead of Likina Amebaw.
