= 2022 African Championships in Athletics – Women's 10,000 metres =

The women's 10,000 metres event at the 2022 African Championships in Athletics was held on 11 June in Port Louis, Mauritius.

== Results ==
Rank	Athlete	Nationality	Time	Notes
1st place, gold medalist(s)	Caroline Nyaga	Kenya	32:12.61	
2nd place, silver medalist(s)	Rachael Zena Chebet	Uganda	32:17.66	
3rd place, bronze medalist(s)	Meseret Gebre	Ethiopia	32:25.97	
4	Meserete Abebayehu	Ethiopia	32:30.75	
5	Sarah Chelangat	Uganda	32:35.16	
6	Glenrose Xaba	South Africa	32:45.05	
7	Brilliant Chepkurui	Kenya	32:51.08	
8	Elvanie Nimbona	Burundi	32:55.35	
9	Purity Komen	Kenya	32:57.11	
10	Cerine Iranzi	Rwanda	33:03.24	
11	Zinash Debebe	Ethiopia	33:10.43	
12	Cian Oldknow	South Africa	33:19.39	
13	Cacisile Soibo	South Africa	36:50.12	
