= Cross Champs =

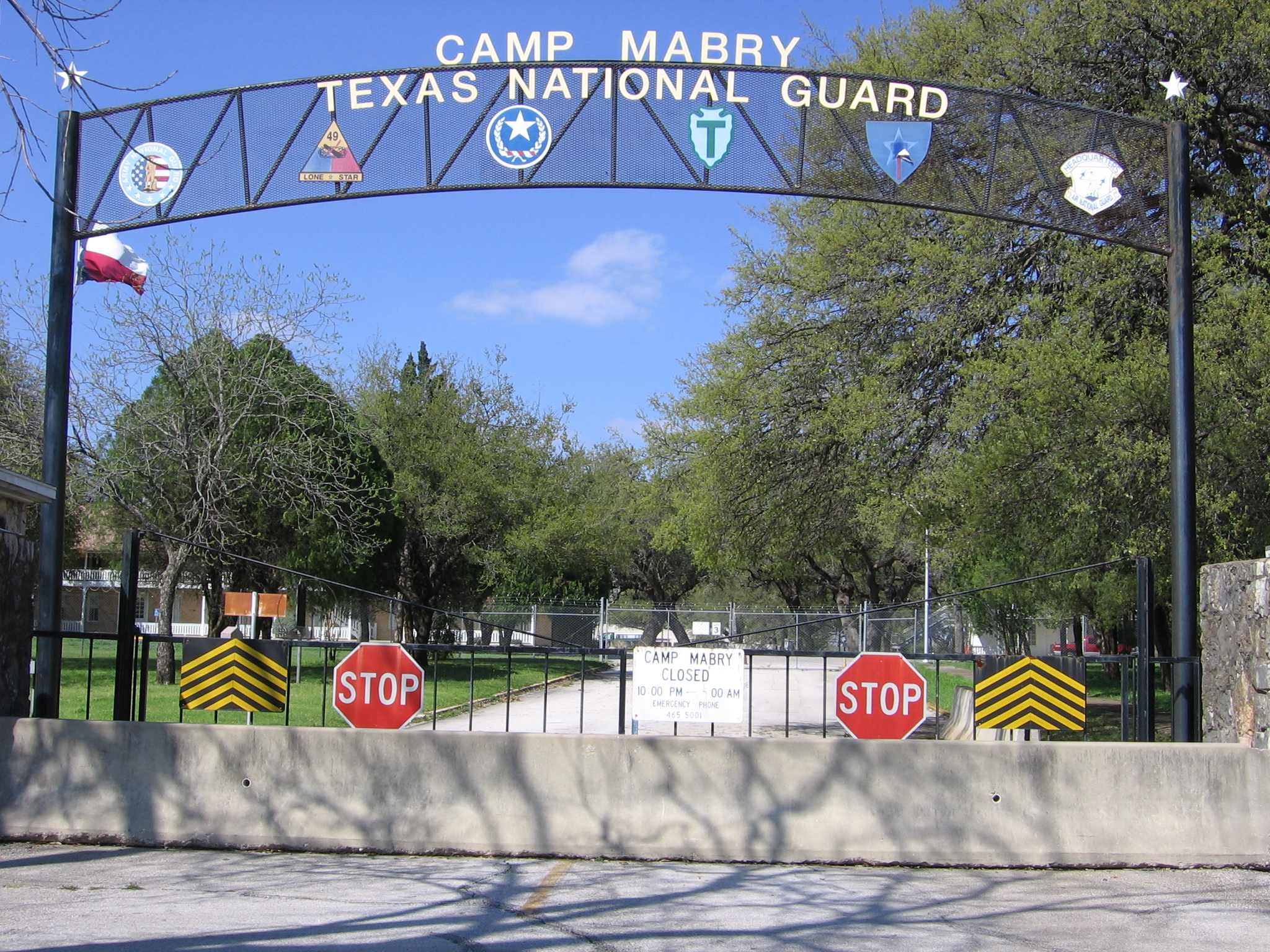
- Camp Mabry, where the event has been held since 2022
- Date: November / December
- Location: Austin, Texas, United States
- Event type: Cross country
- Distance: 5.5 miles (8.9 km) (2021); 8 kilometres (5.0 mi) (2022-)
- Established: 2021
- Website: Official website

The Cross Champs is an annual professional cross country running competition in the United States. First held at Mt. San Antonio College in 2021, it has since been held at Camp Mabry park in Austin, Texas and it usually takes place in November or December. Since its inception it has been a World Athletics Cross Country Tour Gold status meeting, the highest level, and the only such meeting in the United States.

The distance was 5.5 miles (8.9 km) in 2021, but from 2022 onwards it was held over the more standard 8 kilometres (5.0 mi) cross country distance. The competition is organized by Sound Running, and was sponsored by FitnessBank in 2022. Since 2022, it has been held in conjunction with The Running Event expo in Austin.

The Austin course is flat, but is considered difficult because of rocky footing and hay barrels inserted on the ground at portions. Runners could choose to run over or around the barrels.

== Past professional race winners ==
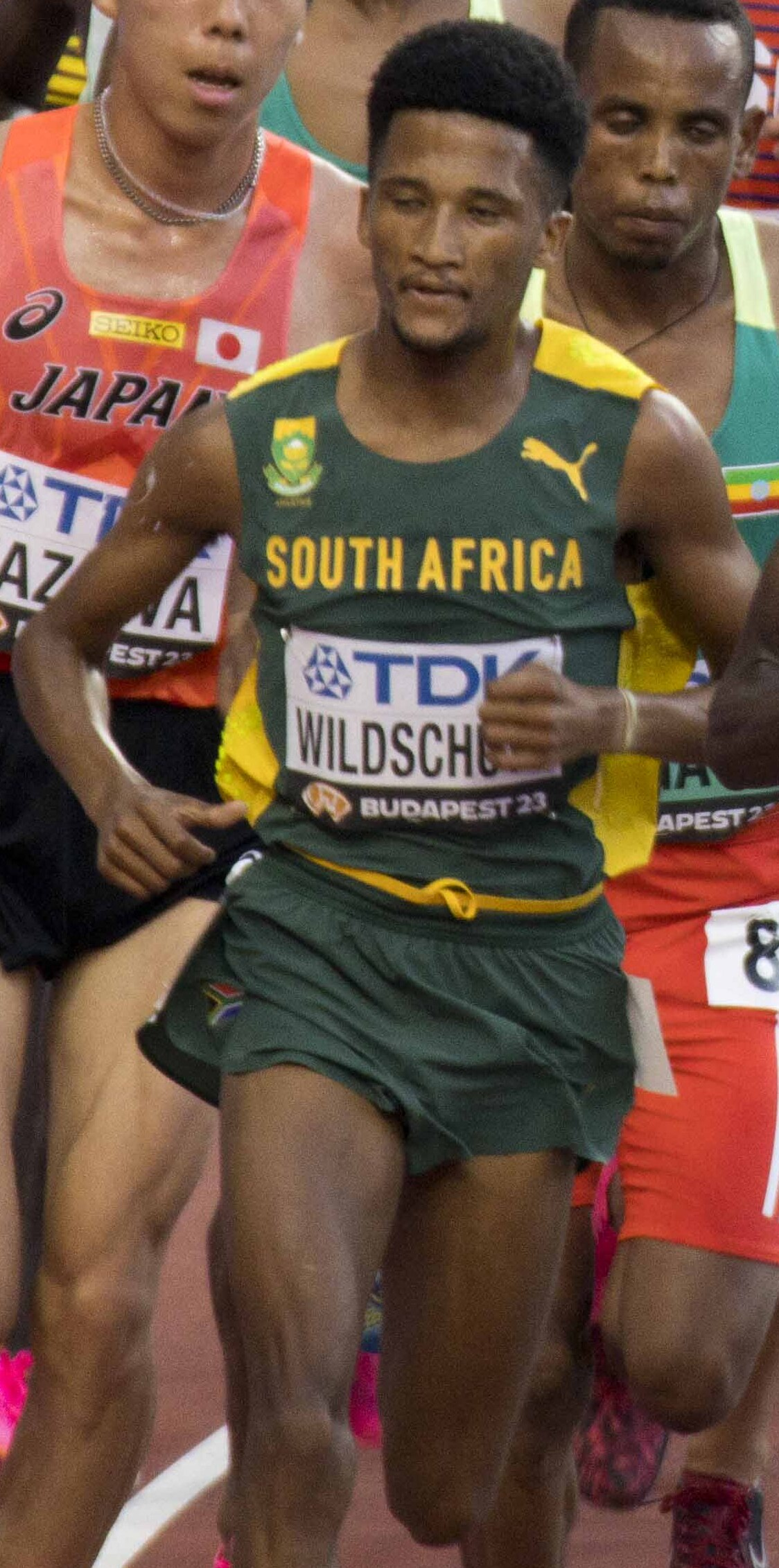
Adriaan Wildschutt won the 2023 race in a course record time

Edition	Date	Men's winner	Time (m:s)	Women's winner	Time (m:s)
1st	4 December 2021	Dillon Maggard (USA)	27:03.6 (5.5 mi)	Allie Buchalski (USA)	31:53.6 (5.5 mi)
2nd	1 December 2022	Edwin Kurgat (KEN)	23:27.5	Alicia Monson (USA)	26:55.7
3rd	30 November 2023	Adriaan Wildschutt (RSA)	22:07.4	Katie Wasserman (USA)	26:49.4
4th	21 November 2024	Edwin Kurgat (KEN)	22:51	Emily Venters (USA)	26:03
