= The Great Chepsaita Cross Country =

Kenyan cross country running competition

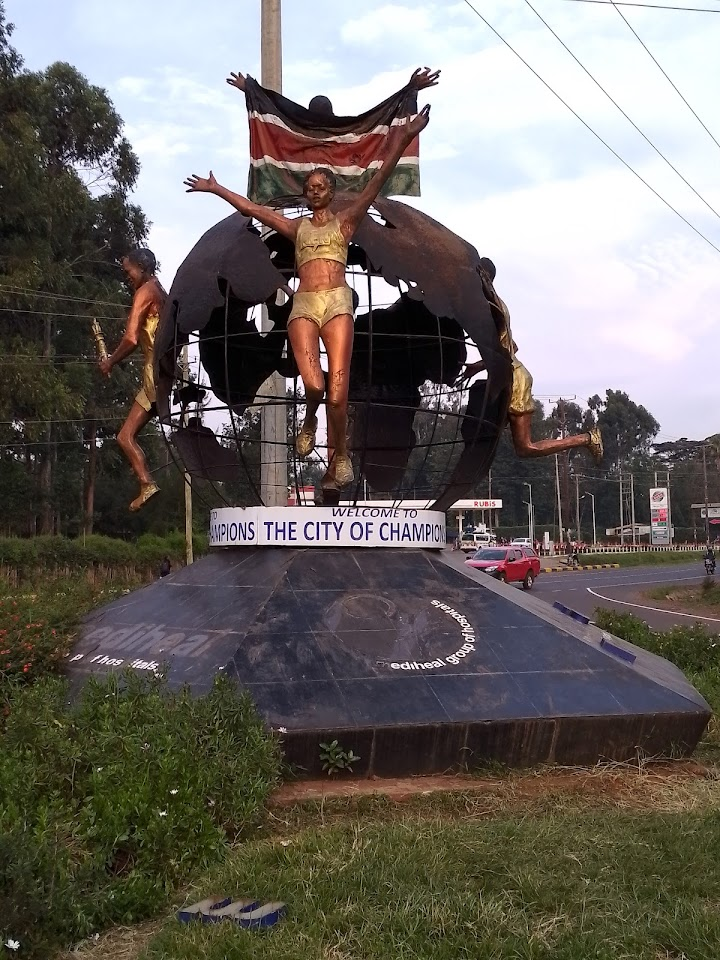
- The City of Champions running monument in Eldoret, the host of the Great Chepsaita run
- Date: December
- Location: Chepsaita, Eldoret, Kenya
- Event type: Cross country
- Distance: 10 km
- Established: 2023
- Website: Official website

The Great Chepsaita Cross Country Run, also known as Chepsaita Run or The Great Chepsaita Cross Country, is an annual professional cross country running competition in Chepsaita, Eldoret, Kenya. First held in 2023, it takes place in early December. As of 2024 it is a World Athletics Cross Country Tour Gold status meeting, the highest level, joining Sirikwa Cross Country Classic as the only such meetings in Kenya and Africa.

The race was upgraded to Gold status in 2024, announced at a launch event with Eliud Kipchoge and 2023 winner Edinah Jebitok.

The competition awards prizes for youth, open, and senior level races. At the 2023 edition, Kenyan grandmother Benedicta Kosgei won a cow by placing 3rd in the senior division race.

== Professional race winners ==
Ed.	Date	Men's winner	Time (m:s)	Women's winner	Time (m:s)	Ref.
1st	2 Dec 2023	Ishmael Kipkurui (KEN)	23:17 (8 km)	Edinah Jebitok (KEN)	26:17 (8 km)	
2nd	7 Dec 2024	Samwel Masai (KEN)	30:49 (10 km)	Loice Chekwemoi (UGA)	34:32 (10 km)	
3rd	6 Dec 2025	Matthew Kipruto (KEN)	31:49 (10 km)	Dorcus Chepkwekoi (KEN)	35:44 (10 km)	
