= Festival du Cross =

French cross country running competition

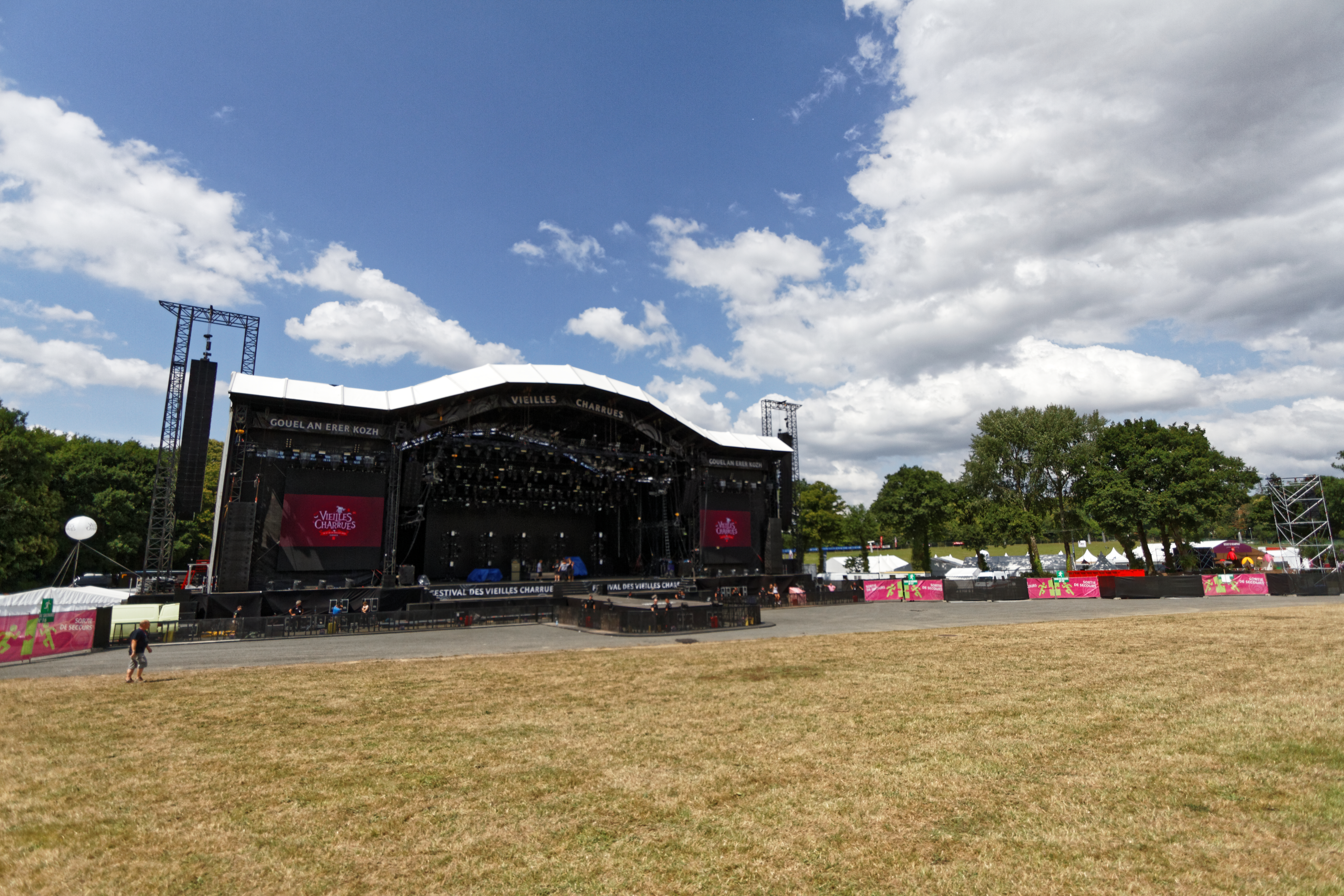
- The stage of the Festival des Vieilles Charrues at Kerampuilh, the inspiration and hosting site of the Festival du Cross
- Date: November
- Location: Carhaix, France
- Event type: Cross country
- Distance: 5.865 km
- Established: 2023
- Website: Official website

The Festival du Cross, also known as Festival du Cross-Country, is an annual professional cross country running competition in Carhaix, France. First held in 2023, it takes place in November. As of 2024 it is a World Athletics Cross Country Tour Gold status meeting, the highest level, joining Cross d'Allonnes as the only such meetings in France.

The race is organized by the ALCP Athletics club and the Ligue de Bretagne. It was named after the Festival des Vieilles Charrues. The event takes place over 4 days with the professional races occurring on the final day.

The site put in a bid to host the European Cross Country Championships following the 2023 edition.

== Professional race winners ==
Ed.	Date	Men's winner	Time (m:s)	Women's winner	Time (m:s)	Ref.
1st	26 Nov 2023	Pierre Riaux (FRA)	19:45 (5.865 km)	Anais Duval (FRA)	23:55 (5.865 km)	
2nd	24 Nov 2024	Matthew Kipkoech Kipruto (KEN)	22:35 (7.31 km)	Belinda Chemutai (UGA)	25:51 (7.31 km)	
