= Fantaye Belayneh =

Ethiopian long-distance runner (born 2000)

Personal information
- Full name: Fantaye Belayneh Azale
- Nationality: Ethiopia
- Born: September 15, 2000 (age 26)

Sport
- Sport: Athletics
- Events: 10K run 5000 metres

Achievements and titles
- National finals: 2021 Ethiopian Champs; • 5000 m, 6th; 2022 Ethiopian Champs; • 5000 m, 1st (gold)
- Personal bests: 10K road: 30:24 (2022); 5000 m: 14:35.27 (2024)
Medal record
Women's athletics
Representing Ethiopia
African Championships
Gold medal – first place	2024 Douala	5000 m
Silver medal – second place	2022 Saint Pierre	5000 m
- Updated on 1 January 2024

Fantaye Belayneh Azale (born 15 September 2000), also spelled Fentaye Azale, is an Ethiopian long-distance runner. She won the silver medal in the 5000 metres at the 2022 African Championships.

== Biography ==
Fantaye's first recorded race was in April 2021 at the Ethiopian Athletics Championships, where she finished sixth in the 5000 m. At the separately held 2021 Ethiopian Olympic Trials in Hengelo, Fantaye finished 6th again in 14:44.51, and did not make the Ethiopian Olympic team.

On 2 April 2022, Fantaye won her first Ethiopian Athletics Championships title in Hawassa. Later that month in Herzogenaurach, she won the Adizero: Road To Records road 10K in a time of 30:25, among the top 30 marks all-time in that event.

In June at the 2022 African Championships in Athletics, Fantaye won a silver medal in the 5000 metres behind Beatrice Chebet. Fantaye was also the winner of the 2022 Beach to Beacon 10K in a time of 32:07.

== Statistics ==
=== Personal bests ===
Event	Mark	Place	Competition	Venue	Date	Ref
10K run	30:24	1st place, gold medalist(s)	Adizero: Road To Records	Herzogenaurach, Germany	30 April 2022	
5000 m	14:44.51	6th	Ethiopian Olympic Trials	Hengelo, Netherlands	8 June 2021	
