= Cross Internacional de la Constitución =

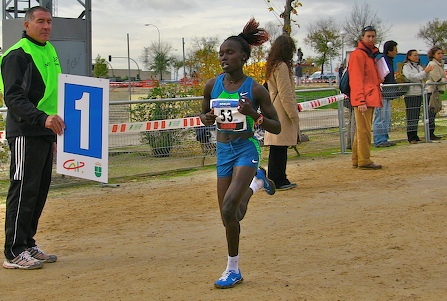
- Vivian Cheruiyot running in Alcobendas in 2006
- Date: Late November or early December
- Location: Alcobendas, Spain
- Event type: Cross country
- Distance: 8.04 km for men & women
- Established: 1982
- Website: Cross de la Constitución
- Participants: 115 (2019); 148 (2018)

Cross Internacional de la Constitución is an annual cross country running event which is held in early December in Alcobendas, Spain. The competition was first held in 1982 and began attracting top-level elite distance runners from the 1990s onwards. Hosted by the Club de Atletismo Popular de Alcobendas, the Cross de la Constitución takes place in Parque de Andalucia near the industrial centre in the city. Almost 600 runners took part in the races in 2010.

The men's elite competition is held over roughly 10 km, while the women elite runners compete over approximately 6 km. The exact race distances of the courses on the park's looped circuit vary from year to year, thus no course record is kept. The women's race was previously about 5 km but has been around 6 km since 1999. The race day's events include nine categories of competition: six are youth races by age group, short and long course races are held for senior athletes, and a separate veteran's race is also held for older runners.

Winners of the competition have included a number of World Cross Country champions: Zersenay Tadese, Joseph Ebuya, Gebregziabher Gebremariam and Albertina Dias have all gone on to win the world title after victory in Alcobendas. Other winners of note include Spanish marathon world champion Martín Fiz and track world champions Benjamin Limo, Vivian Cheruiyot and Linet Masai. The meet previously received permit status from European Athletics, the continental body for the sport.

== Past senior race winners ==
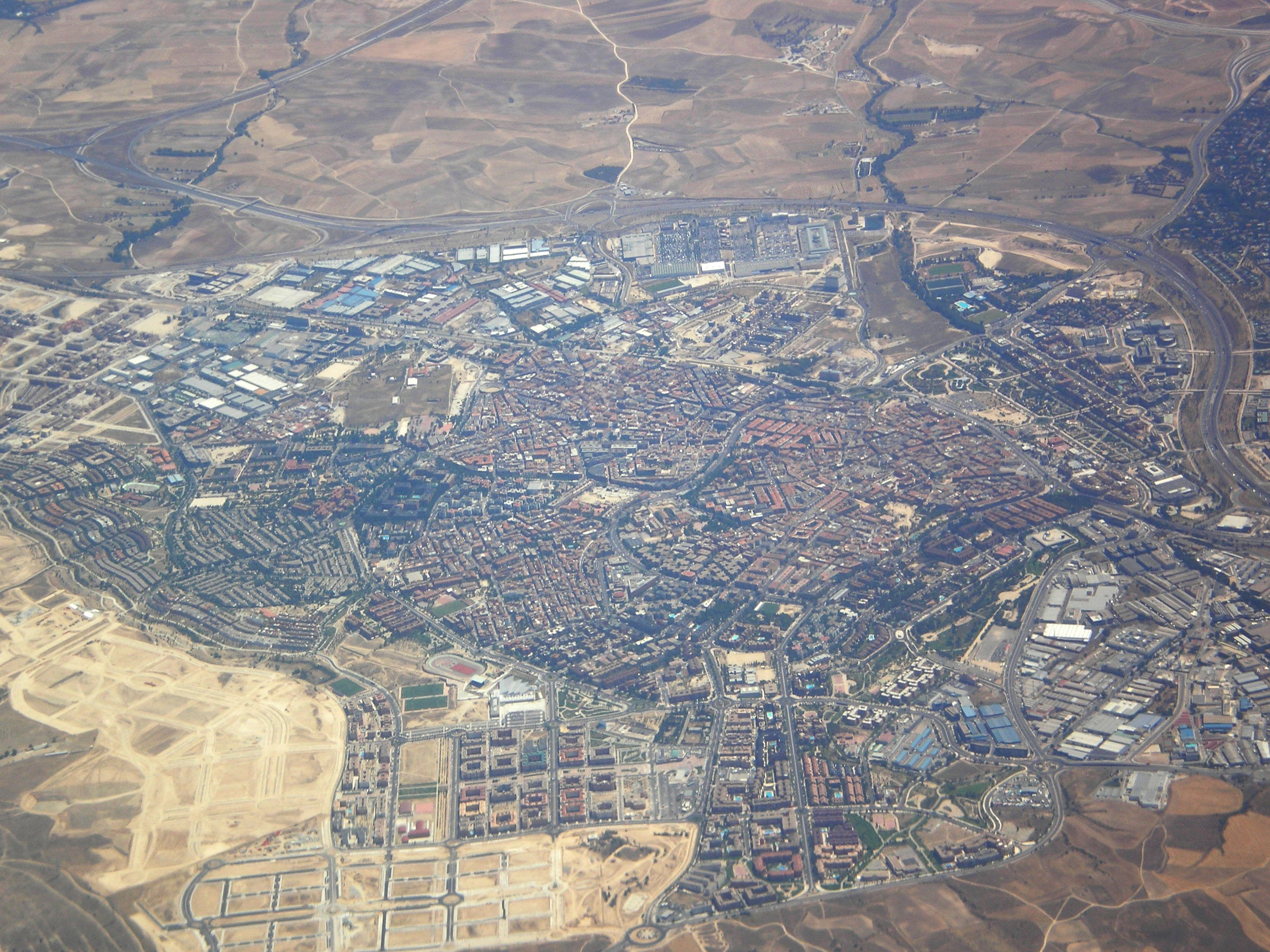
An aerial view of the host city and San Sebastián de los Reyes.

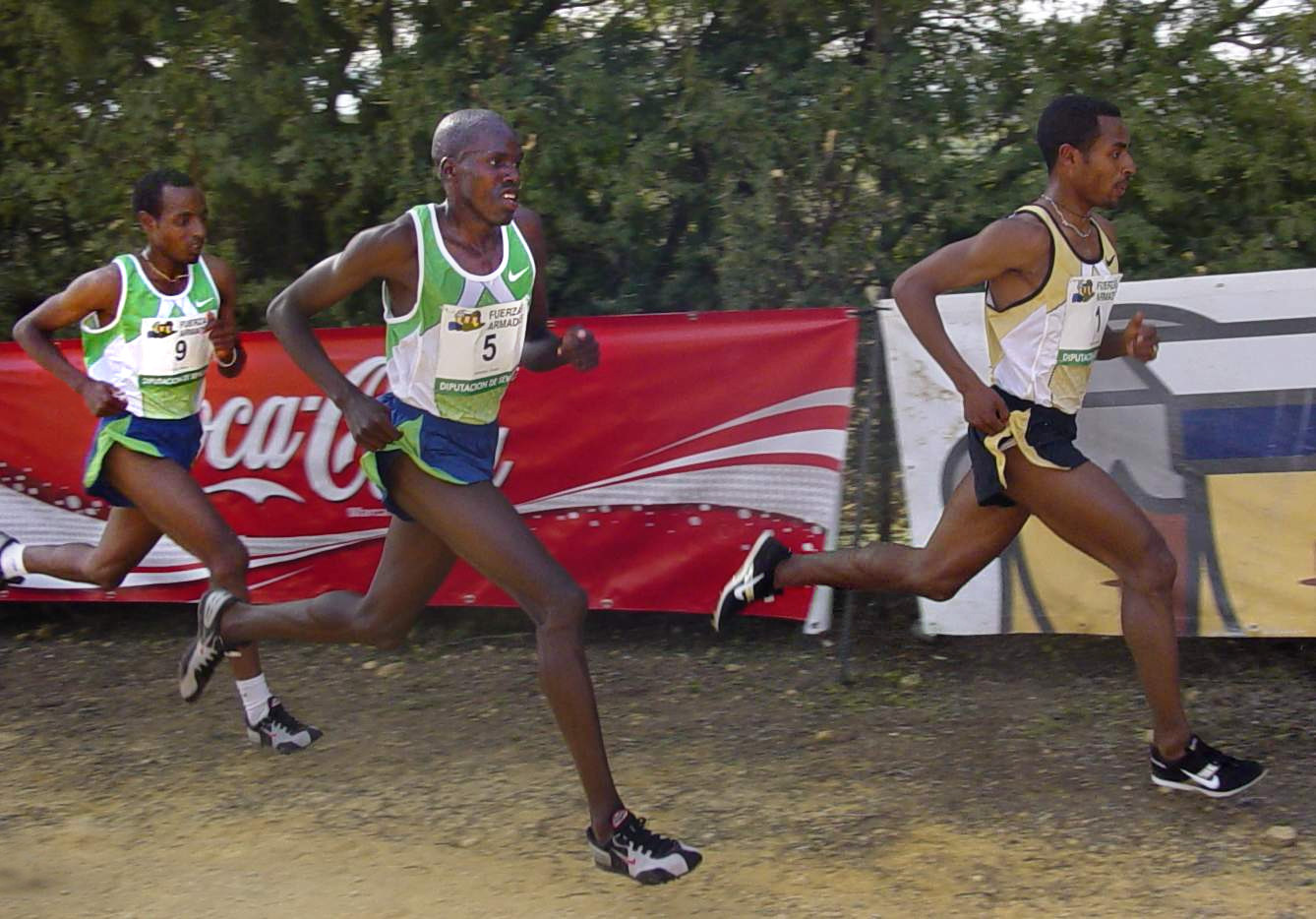
Tariku Bekele (left) and Abraham Chebii (center) have both won in Alcobendas.

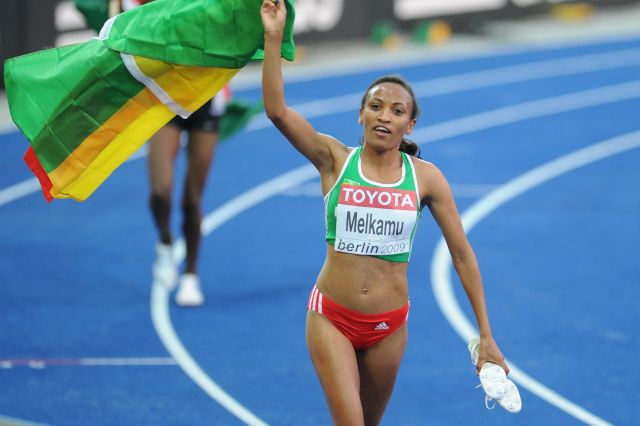
Meselech Melkamu took consecutive titles in 2005 to 2006.

Edition	Year	Men's winner	Time (m:s)	Women's winner	Time (m:s)
I	1982	Santiago Manguán (ESP)		María del Mar Arrollaga (ESP)	
II	1983	Karl Harrison (ENG)		Alicia Silva (POR)	
III	1984	António Leitão (POR)		Leonor Costa (POR)	
IV	1985	João Campos (POR)		Alejandra Ramos (CHI)	
V	1986	Manuel Matias (POR)		Ana Isabel Alonso (ESP)	
VI	1987	David Lewis (ENG)		Conceição Ferreira (POR)	
VII	1988	Domingos Castro (POR)		Dolores Rizo (ESP)	
VIII	1989	Carlos Monteiro (POR)	27:50	Ana Moreira (POR)	13:36
IX	1990	William Mutwol (KEN)	28:52	Albertina Dias (POR)	17:14
X	1991	Martín Fiz (ESP)	32:05	Tullia Orietta Mancia (ITA)	19:22
XI	1992	Martín Fiz (ESP)	29:36	Lydia Cheromei (KEN)	17:54
XII	1993	Ondoro Osoro (KEN)	28:09	Conceição Ferreira (POR)	16:24
XIII	1994	Shem Kororia (KEN)	29:12	Merima Denboba (ETH)	17:09
XIV	1995	Shem Kororia (KEN)	29:52	Sally Barsosio (KEN)	18:20
XV	1996	Paul Koech (KEN)	29:00	Albertina Dias (POR)	17:36
XVI	1997	Paul Koech (KEN)	28:26	Merima Denboba (ETH)	16:30
XVII	1998	Daniel Gachara (KEN)	28:01	Genet Gebregiorgis (ETH)	20:46
XVIII	1999	Benjamin Limo (KEN)	30:27	Lydia Cheromei (KEN)	19:26
XIX	2000	Evans Rutto (KEN)	29:15	Rose Cheruiyot (KEN)	18:28
XX	2001	Abraham Chebii (KEN)	29:30	Leah Malot (KEN)	19:49
XXI	2002	Enock Mitei (KEN)	30:42	Salina Kosgei (KEN)	20:13
XXII	2003	John Yuda (TAN)	30:20	Alice Timbilil (KEN)	20:26
XXIII	2004	Fabiano Joseph (TAN)	30:13	Merima Hashim (ETH)	19:26
XXIV	2005	Zersenay Tadese (ERI)	29:14	Meselech Melkamu (ETH)	19:14
XXV	2006	Tariku Bekele (ETH)	32:18	Meselech Melkamu (ETH)	21:16
XXVI	2007	Joseph Ebuya (KEN)	29:08	Eunice Jepkorir (KEN)	19:40
XXVII	2008	Gebregziabher Gebremariam (ETH)	29:08	Linet Masai (KEN)	18:59
XXVIII	2009	Gebregziabher Gebremariam (ETH)	30:55	Vivian Cheruiyot (KEN)	19:53
XXIX	2010	Joseph Ebuya (KEN)	29:37	Mónica Rosa (POR)	20:15
XXX	2011	Kidane Tadesse (ERI)	30:10	Priscah Cherono (KEN)	20:06
XXXI	2012	Teklemariam Medhin (ERI)	28:23	Nazret Weldu (ERI)	26:30
XXXII	2013	Emmanuel Bett (KEN)	28:00	Sofia Assefa (ETH)	25:33
XXXIII	2014	Timothy Toroitich (UGA)	28:36	Doris Changeywo (KEN)	26:49
XXXIV	2015	Tamirat Tola (ETH)	29:28	Linet Masai (KEN)	28:41
XXXV	2016	Timothy Toroitich (UGA)	30:52	Fionnuala McCormack (IRE)	28:18
XXXVI	2017	Aron Kifle (ERI)	29:22	Alice Aprot (KEN)	27:20
XXXVII	2018	Jacob Kiplimo (UGA)	30:01	Eva Cherono (KEN)	27:20
XXXVIII	2019	Thierry Ndikumwenayo (BDI)	27:23	Eva Cherono (KEN)	27:10
XXXIX	2021	Abdessamad Oukhelfen (ESP)	29:23	Dolshi Tesfu (ERI)	26:45
XL	2022	Rodrigue Kwizera (BDI)	29:58	Lucy Mawia (KEN)	27:06
XLI	2023	Rodrigue Kwizera (BDI)	29:34	Likina Amebaw (ETH)	26:34
XLII	2024	Rodrigue Kwizera (BDI)	22:59	Nadia Battocletti (ITA)	26:14
XLIII	2025	Rodrigue Kwizera (BDI)	22:58	Yenenesh Shimeket (ETH)	25:34

=== Wins by country ===
Country	Men's race	Women's race	Total
Kenya	14	17	31
Ethiopia	4	9	13
Portugal	5	8	13
Spain	4	3	7
Eritrea	4	2	6
Burundi	5	0	5
Uganda	3	0	3
England	2	0	2
Tanzania	2	0	2
Italy	0	2	2
Chile	0	1	1
Ireland	0	1	1
