= Mercy Chepkemoi =

Kenyan athlete (born 2005)

Personal information
- Born: 19 October 2005 (age 20)

Sport
- Sport: Athletics
- Event(s): Long distance running, Cross Country Running

Achievements and titles
- Personal best(s): 1500m 4:12.60 (Nairobi, 2025); 3000m 9:10.54 (Lima, 2024); 5000m 15:33.29 (Lima, 2024)
Medal record
Women's athletics
Representing Kenya
World U20 Championships
Bronze medal – third place	2024 Lima	5000 m

Mercy Chepkemoi (born 19 October 2005) is a Kenyan long-distance and cross country runner.

== Biography ==
Chepkemoi studied at the Tiloa Secondary School in Nakuru County, Kenya. She later trained at the Tiloa Camp in Kuresoi, alongside runners such as Purity Chepkirui. Chepkemoi won the under-20 women's 6 km race at the Sirikwa Classic World Cross Country Tour in Kapseret, Uasin Gishu County, on 3 February 2024. She ran for Kenya at the 2024 World Athletics Cross Country Championships in Belgrade, Serbia, in the U20 women's race, placing twelfth overall as the Kenyan team won the silver medal.

Chepkemoi placed sixth in the final of the 2024 African Championships in the women's 5000 metres in Douala, Cameroon. Chepkemoi then won the 3000m women's final during Athletics Kenya World Under-20 Trials in Nairobi. She subsequently won the bronze medal in the 5000 metres at the 2024 World Athletics U20 Championships in Lima, Peru, in August 2024, in a personal best of 15:33.29 (originally finished fourth behind Medina Eisa, but Eisa was later given a two-year ban for age falsification violations and stripped of her gold medal). She also placed ninth over 3000 metres at the championships.

On 10 November 2024, she won on the 2024–25 World Athletics Cross Country Tour at the Cross Internacional de Soria, Spain. The following weekend, she placed fifth behind race winner Beatrice Chebet at the Cross Internacional de Itálica, a World Athletics Cross Country Tour Gold race near Seville, Spain.

On 31 May 2025, she placed seventh over 5000 metres at the Kip Keino Classic in 15:36.15. She placed fourth over 1500 metres at the Kenyan Athletics Championships in June 2025.

In April 2026, she was runner-up to Diana Wanza over 5000 metres at the Kip Keino Classic.
