= Caroline Nyaga =

Kenyan long-distance runner (born 1993)

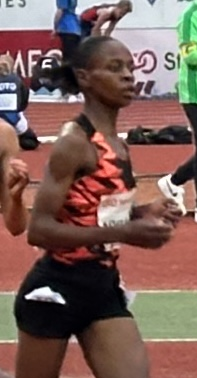
- Nyaga in 2024

Personal information
- Nationality: Kenya
- Born: 10 July 1993 (age 33)
- Height: 160 cm (5 ft 3 in)
- Weight: 45 kg (99 lb)

Sport
- Sport: Athletics
- Events: 5K run 10K run

Achievements and titles
- National finals: 2019 Kenyan XC; • 10km XC, 32nd; 2019 Kenyan Champs; • 10,000m, 3rd (bronze); 2020 Kenyan XC; • 10km XC, 22nd; 2022 Kenyan Champs; • 5000m, 2nd (silver); 2023 Kenyan Champs; • 1500m, 4th
- Personal bests: 5K: 14:35 (2023) 10K: 30:48 (2023)
Medal record
Women's athletics
Representing Kenya
African Championships
Gold medal – first place	2022 Saint Pierre	10,000 m
Silver medal – second place	2024 Douala	1500 m
Bronze medal – third place	2022 Saint Pierre	5000 m
World Road Running Championships
Bronze medal – third place	2026 Copenhagen	5K mixed team
- Updated on 15 January 2024

Caroline Nyaga (born 10 July 1993) is a Kenyan long-distance runner. She arrived at the 2022 African Championships without even a pair of suitable running shoes, but after being gifted a pair from Faith Kipyegon, she won a bronze medal in the 5000 metres and then two days later won gold in the 10,000 metres.

== Career ==
Though Nyaga ran two road races in England and Wales in 2017, she did not debut at an international championship until 2019, earning her first berth to the African Games by finishing 3rd at the Kenyan Athletics Championships 10,000 m in 32:30.63. At the Games race, Nyaga finished 5th in 32:24.17 as the second Kenyan finisher.

After failing to make the Kenyan 2019 World Championships and 2021 Olympics teams, Nyaga secured her next national podium finish at the 2022 Kenyan Championships 5000 m, running 15:32.11 to finish 2nd behind Beatrice Chebet. At first, this was not enough earn her a spot on the Kenyan African Championships team, but another Kenyan athlete's late withdrawal freed up a spot for Nyaga in both the 5000 m and 10,000 m. Nyaga arrived at the championships with only run-down trainers, and she and her coach had to seek advice from Faith Kipyegon, who gave Nyaga new running shoes before the race despite not having met Nyaga before. She had a very successful championships, winning a bronze medal in the 5000 m followed by a gold medal two days later in the 10,000 m. She claimed that an encouraging note from Kipyegon, passed through Nyaga's coach, motivated her to win the 10,000 m title.

In 2023, Nyaga finished 7th at the Kenyan World Championships 5000 m trials, failing to make the Kenyan Worlds team. After seven laps, Faith Kipyegon began to pull away with two other athletes, and Nyaga struggled to stay with the trio and was passed by three other athletes by the finish. Nyaga later said that her issue was holding her kick for the last lap, and that she would work on her issues and bounce back for the 2024 Summer Olympics.

== Statistics ==
=== Best performances ===
Event	Mark	Pl.	Competition	Venue	Date	Ref
5K run	14:35	1st place, gold medalist(s)	Semi Marathon de Lille	Lille, France	19 March 2023	
10K run	30:48	1st place, gold medalist(s)	10k Ibiza - Platja D'en Bossa	Ibiza, Spain	29 January 2023	
