= Mezgebu Sime =

Ethiopian track and field athlete

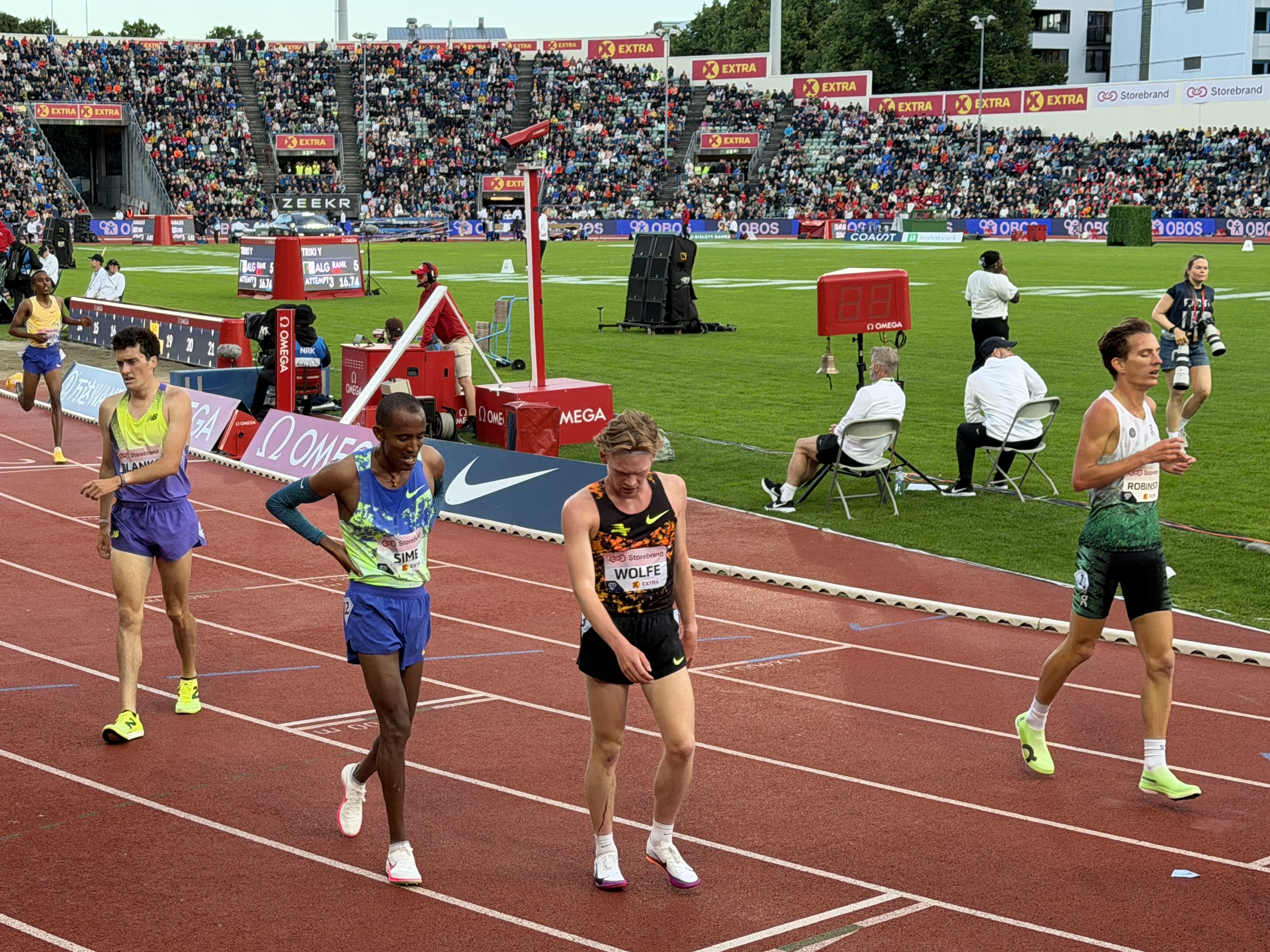
- Sime at the 2026 Bislett Games

Personal information
- Nationality: Ethiopian
- Born: 7 October 2005 (age 20)

Sport
- Sport: Athletics
- Event: Long-distance running
Medal record
Women's athletics
Representing Ethiopia
World Road Running Championships
Gold medal – first place	2026 Copenhagen	5k mixed team
World Cross Country Championships
Gold medal – first place	2026 Tallahassee	Senior team
Silver medal – second place	2024 Belgrade	Junior team
Silver medal – second place	2024 Belgrade	Junior race

Mezgebu Sime (born 7 October 2005) is an Ethiopian long-distance runner.

== Biography ==
Mezgebu has won the Ethiopian under-20 title over 5000 metres. He finished sixth at the Great Ethiopian Run in a time of 29:00 in November 2023.

In March 2024, he won silver medals in both the U20 individual race, and in the team U20 race, at the 2024 World Athletics Cross Country Championships in Serbia.

He finished in third place over 5000 metres at the 2025 Shanghai Diamond League event, in a personal best time of 12:51.86, finishing narrowly behind the event winner Berihu Aregawi and second placed compatriot Kuma Girma. He also ran in the Diamond League in June 2025 at the 2025 Meeting de Paris. In July 2025, he was provisionally named as a reserve for the Ethiopian team for the 5000 metres at the 2025 World Athletics Championships in Tokyo, Japan.

Sime was selected for the senior Ethiopian team for the 2026 World Athletics Cross Country Championships in Tallahassee, United States. In April, Sime finished runner-up in 13:21 behind Addisu Yihune at the Boston 5K. Competing in the Diamond League at the 2026 Athletissima in Lausanne, Switzerland, on 21 August 2026, he placed sixth over 5000 metres. Competing in the 5k at the 2026 World Athletics Road Running Championships in Copenhagen in September 2026, he finished seventh in the men's race, claiming team mixed gold medal alongside Likina Amebaw, Addisu Yihune and Aleshign Baweke.
