= Cross Internacional de Venta de Baños =

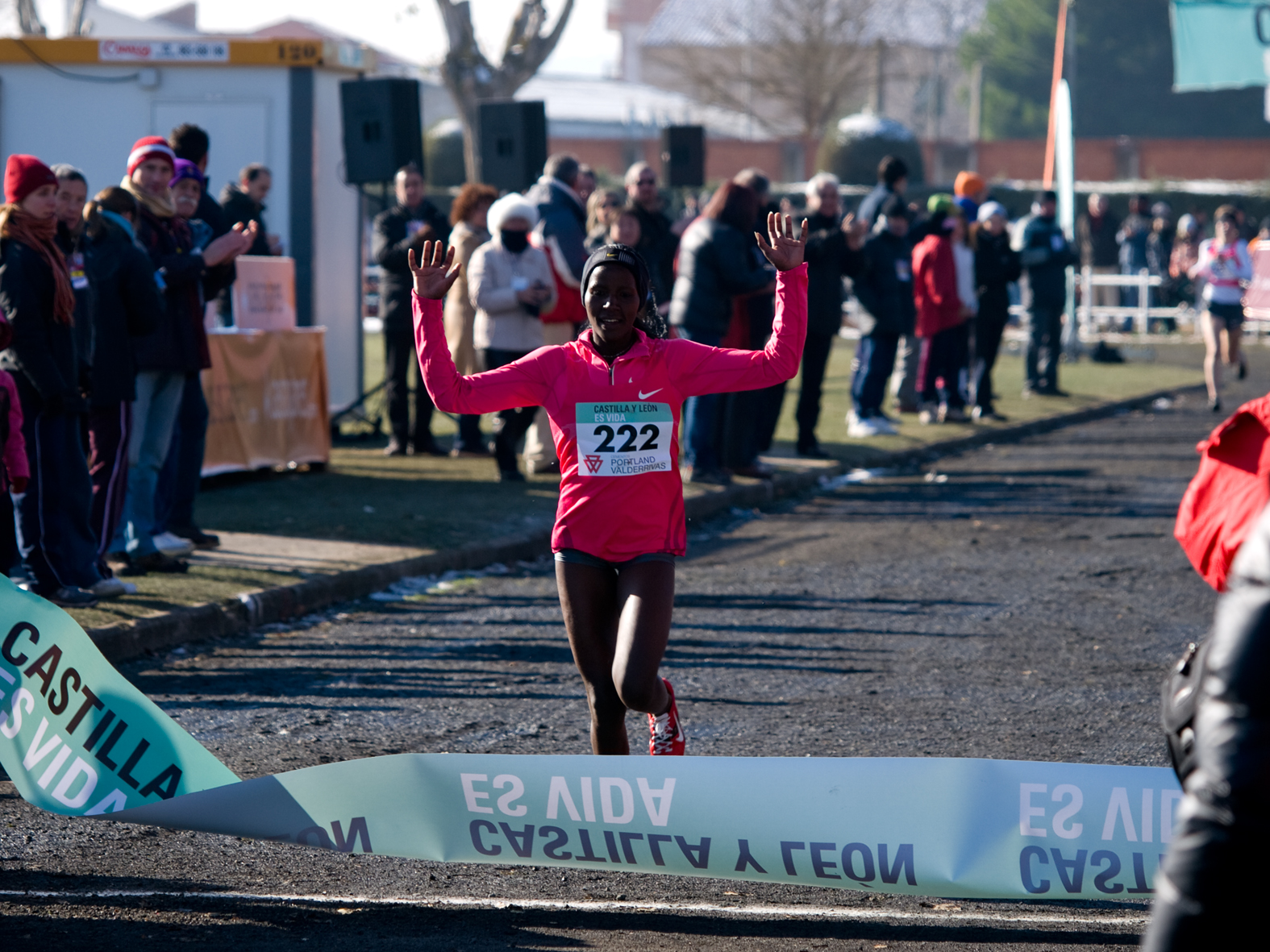
- Verónica Nyaruai winning the 2009 women's race
- Date: Mid-December
- Location: Venta de Baños, Spain
- Event type: Cross country
- Distance: 9.3 km for men & women
- Established: 1980
- Website: Cross de Venta de Baños
- Participants: 38 (2021); 47 (2019)

The Cross Internacional de Venta de Baños is a cross country running competition that takes place in Venta de Baños, Castile and León, Spain. The competition was first held in 1980 and since then it has been held every year in mid-December. Among the past winners are international athletes, such as former World Cross Country Champions Kenenisa Bekele and Gelete Burka, and local athletes Marta Domínguez and Isaac Viciosa (both former European Champions).

The competition began life as a regional competition, the Cross de Navidad (Christmas cross country), in 1980. The race became national in its second edition and, following the acceptance of an English team into the competition in 1982, it obtained its current name – the Cross Internacional de Venta de Baños. The competition was televised throughout Spain for the first time in 1984, but it was not until 1995 that the competition was broadcast annually.

The course on which the competition is held is defined by the muddy and cold conditions typical of Palencia in winter. The event comprises two distinct parts: the professional senior races and the amateur fun run races. The competition's races are separated into categories based on age and sex, including: the professional senior races, veteran competitions, under-23 and junior competitions, as well as four other youth categories for children. The professional men's senior race is usually held over 10.7 kilometres while the course for the women's senior race tends to be 6.6 km long. Both senior races trace a path through the flat, grassy areas to the east of the village before running a loop around the local sports centre.

== Past senior race winners ==
Edition	Year	Men's winner	Time (m:s)	Women's winner	Time (m:s)
I	1980	Santiago de la Parte (ESP)		Ana Isabel Alonso (ESP)	
II	1981	Santiago de la Parte (ESP)		Pilar Fernández (ESP)	
III	1982	Santiago de la Parte (ESP)		Laura Blanco (ESP)	
IV	1983	Constantino Esparcia (ESP)		Pilar Fernández (ESP)	
V	1984	Ezequiel Canário (POR)		Asunción Sinovas (ESP)	
VI	1985	Santiago Llorente (ESP)		Montse Abelló (ESP)	
VII	1986	José Luis González (ESP)		Ana Isabel Alonso (ESP)	
VIII	1987	Domingos Castro (POR)		Ana Isabel Alonso (ESP)	
IX	1988	José Regalo (POR)		Mary Chemweno (KEN)	
X	1989	Domingos Castro (POR)		Lieve Slegers (BEL)	
XI	1990	Brahim Lahlafi (MAR)		Shelly Steely (USA)	
XII	1991	William Koech (KEN)		Susan Sirma (KEN)	
XIII	1992	Domingos Castro (POR)		Hellen Kimaiyo (KEN)	
XIV	1993	Fita Bayisa (ETH)		Hellen Chepngeno (KEN)	
XV	1994	Domingos Castro (POR)		Hellen Kimaiyo (KEN)	
XVI	1995	Antonio Serrano (ESP)		Pauline Konga (KEN)	
XVII	1996	Shem Kororia (KEN)		Sally Chepkorir (KEN)	
XVIII	1997	Isaac Viciosa (ESP)		Berhane Adere (ETH)	
XIX	1998	Isaac Viciosa (ESP)		Genet Gebregiorgis (ETH)	
XX	1999	Hailu Mekonnen (ETH)		Helena Sampaio (POR)	
XXI	2000	John Korir (KEN)		Rose Cheruiyot (KEN)	
XXII	2001	Serhiy Lebid (UKR)		Yamna Belkacem (FRA)	
XXIII	2002	Sileshi Sihine (ETH)	32:37	Joan Aiyabei (KEN)	21:59
XXIV	2003	Sileshi Sihine (ETH)	31:29	Justyna Bąk (POL)	22:05
XXV	2004	Kenenisa Bekele (ETH)	30:26	Kathy Butler (GBR)	20:38
XXVI	2005	Alberto García (ESP)	31:34	Gelete Burka (ETH)	21:05
XXVII	2006	Abebe Dinkesa (ETH)	31:30	Wude Ayalew (ETH)	21:21
XXVIII	2007	Tadese Tola (ETH)	30:39	Marta Domínguez (ESP)	20:56
XXIX	2008	Alemayehu Bezabeh (ESP)	31:45	Inês Monteiro (POR)	22:41
XXX	2009	Sergio Sánchez (ESP)	30:59	Veronica Nyaruai (KEN)	22:47
XXXI	2010	Lucas Rotich (KEN)	32:20	Alessandra Aguilar (ESP)	23:19
XXXII	2011	Philemon Limo (KEN)	31:57	Priscah Cherono (KEN)	22:47
XXXIII	2012	Vincent Chepkok (KEN)	35:20	Mercy Cherono (KEN)	24:33
XXXIV	2013	Cyprian Kotut (KEN)	31:58	Mercy Cherono (KEN)	23:08
XXXV	2014	Timothy Toroitich (UGA)	34:57	Mimi Belete (BHR)	24:05
XXXVI	2015	Aweke Ayalew (BHR)	32:17	Alemitu Heroye (ETH)	24:12
XXXVII	2016	Aweke Ayalew (BHR)	32:42	Etenesh Diro (ETH)	30:35
XXXVIII	2017	Selemon Barega (ETH)	31:09	Ruth Jebet (BHR)	25:45
XXXIX	2018	Vincent Rono (KEN)	34:16	Letesenbet Gidey (ETH)	27:22
XL	2019	Albert Chemutai (UGA)	32:13	Zenebu Fikadu (ETH)	26:44
XLI	2021	Rodrigue Kwizera (BDI)	32:30	Edinah Jebitok (KEN)	28:44
XLII	2022	Rodrigue Kwizera (BDI)	34:06	Francine Niyonsaba (BDI)	30:44
XLIII	2023	Abdessamad Oukhelfen (ESP)	30:16	Edinah Jebitok (KEN)	33:11
XLIV	2024	Nassim Hassaous (ESP)	29:38	Carolina Robles (ESP)	33:56
XLV	2025	Brian Kiptoo (KEN)	31:43	Dorcus Chepkwekoi (KEN)	36:09

=== Wins by country ===
Country	Men's race	Women's race	Total
Kenya	9	16	25
Spain	14	11	24
Ethiopia	8	8	16
Portugal	6	2	8
Bahrain	2	2	4
Burundi	2	1	3
Uganda	2	0	2
Belgium	0	1	1
France	0	1	1
Great Britain	0	1	1
Morocco	1	0	1
Poland	0	1	1
Ukraine	1	0	1
United States	0	1	1
