= Belinda Chemutai =

Ugandan athlete (born 2000)

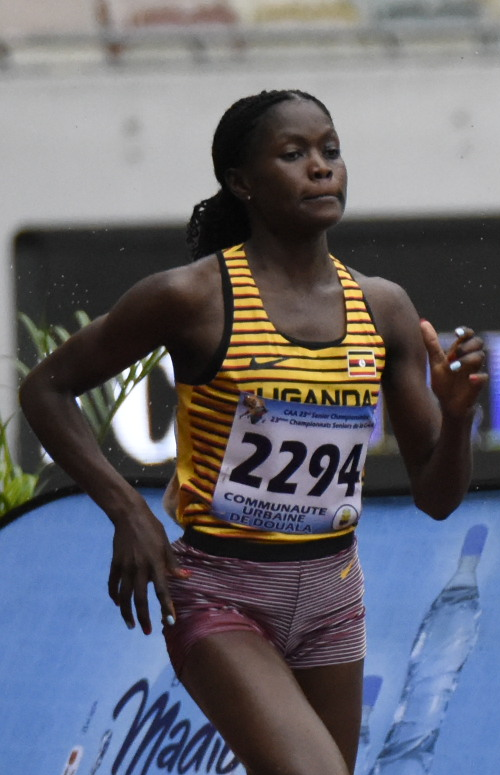

Personal information
- Nationality: Ugandan
- Born: 30 April 2000 (age 25)

Sport
- Sport: Athletics
- Event: Long distance running

Belinda Chemutai (born 30 April 2000) is an Ugandan long distance and cross country runner.

== Career ==
She finished 19th in the half marathon at the 2023 World Athletics Road Running Championships in Riga.

In March 2024, she was selected for the World Cross Country Championships in Serbia.

She ran at the African Athletics Championships in June 2024 over 1500 metres, qualifying for the final, and placing eighth overall.

In August 2024, she ran the 5000 metres at the 2024 Paris Olympics.

Chemutai tested positive for testosterone at the World Half Marathon championships in October 2023. Subsequently the Athletics Integrity Unit nullified all of her results since then and imposed a sanction of ineligibility lasting until April 2028. This includes disqualification of her 2024 Olympic performance.
