= Cross Internacional de Soria =

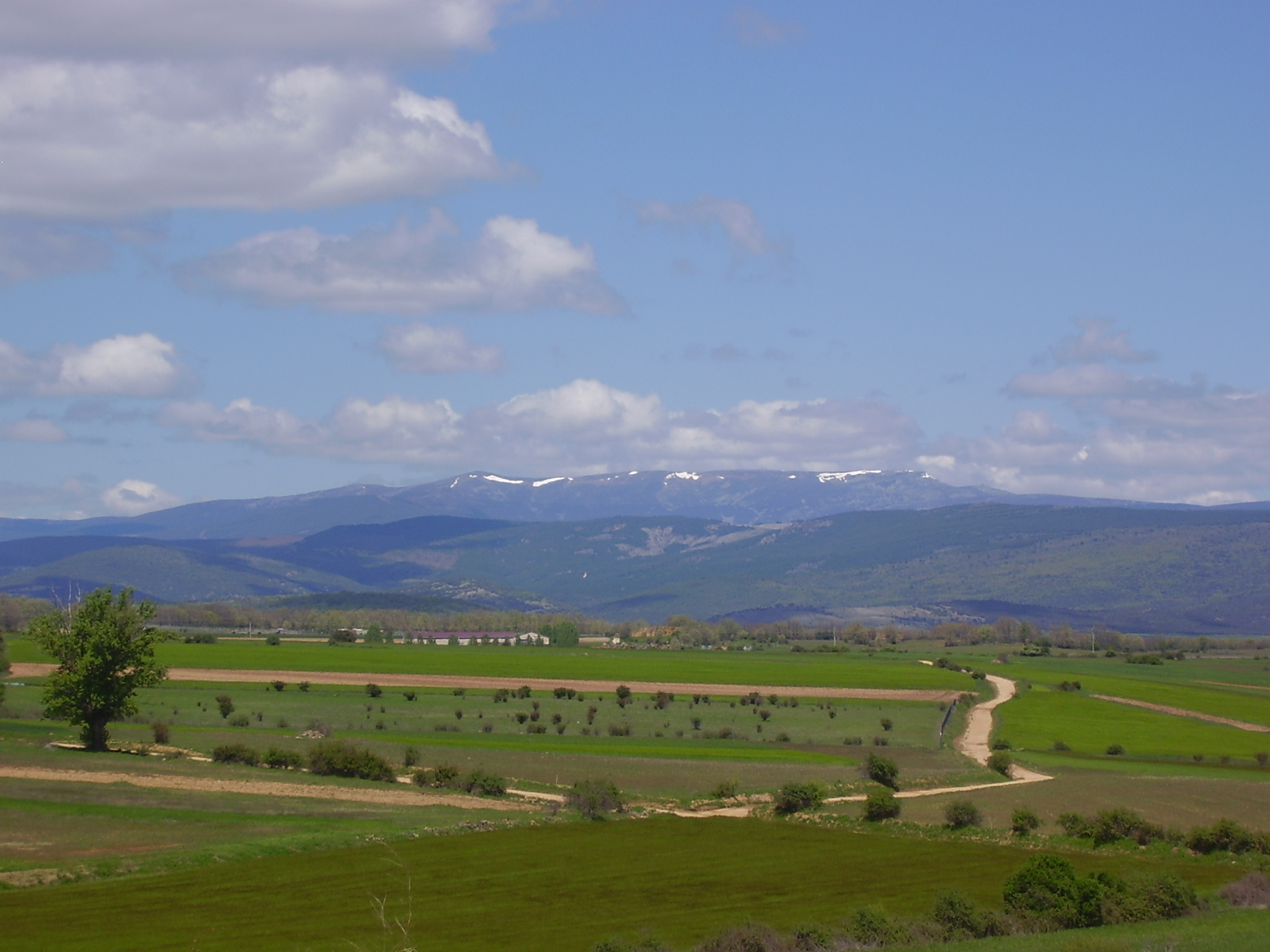
- The race course is set in a grassy suburb of the city of Soria
- Date: Late November
- Location: Soria, Spain
- Event type: Cross country
- Distance: 8 km for men & women
- Established: 1994
- Website: Cross Internacional de Soria
- Participants: 19,448 (2019); 19,569 (2018)

The Cross Internacional de Soria, also known as the Campo a Través Internacional de Soria, is an annual cross country running competition that takes place in Soria, Spain. First held in 1994, it usually takes place in late November and gained IAAF cross country permit meeting status in 2007. It was previously a European Athletic Association permit meeting.

The competition features elite races of 10 km for men and 8 km for women. The men's and women's race had initially been competed over distances of 9 km and 6 km respectively, but the course lengths were increased in 2006. The course, known as the "Monte Valonsadero", was used in the early 1990s as a training ground by Fermín Cacho and Abel Antón, two of the region's foremost athletes. After inspecting the area, Miguel Ángel Pérez and Adolfo Caballero (members of the Athletics Delegation for Soria) suggested that a cross country meeting should be held there. It is a grassy course set in the Sorian countryside, and it is at a particularly high altitude – 1063 metres above sea level.

Many World Championship medallists have competed at the course, including Gebregziabher Gebremariam, Zersenay Tadese, Meselech Melkamu and Linet Masai. The meeting tends to be dominated by runners from East Africa and Spain. The high standard of runners that the meeting attracts means that the Cross Internacional de Soria is consistently ranked among the best cross country meetings in Spain by the Real Federación Española de Atletismo – the Spanish governing body for athletics.

== Past senior race winners ==
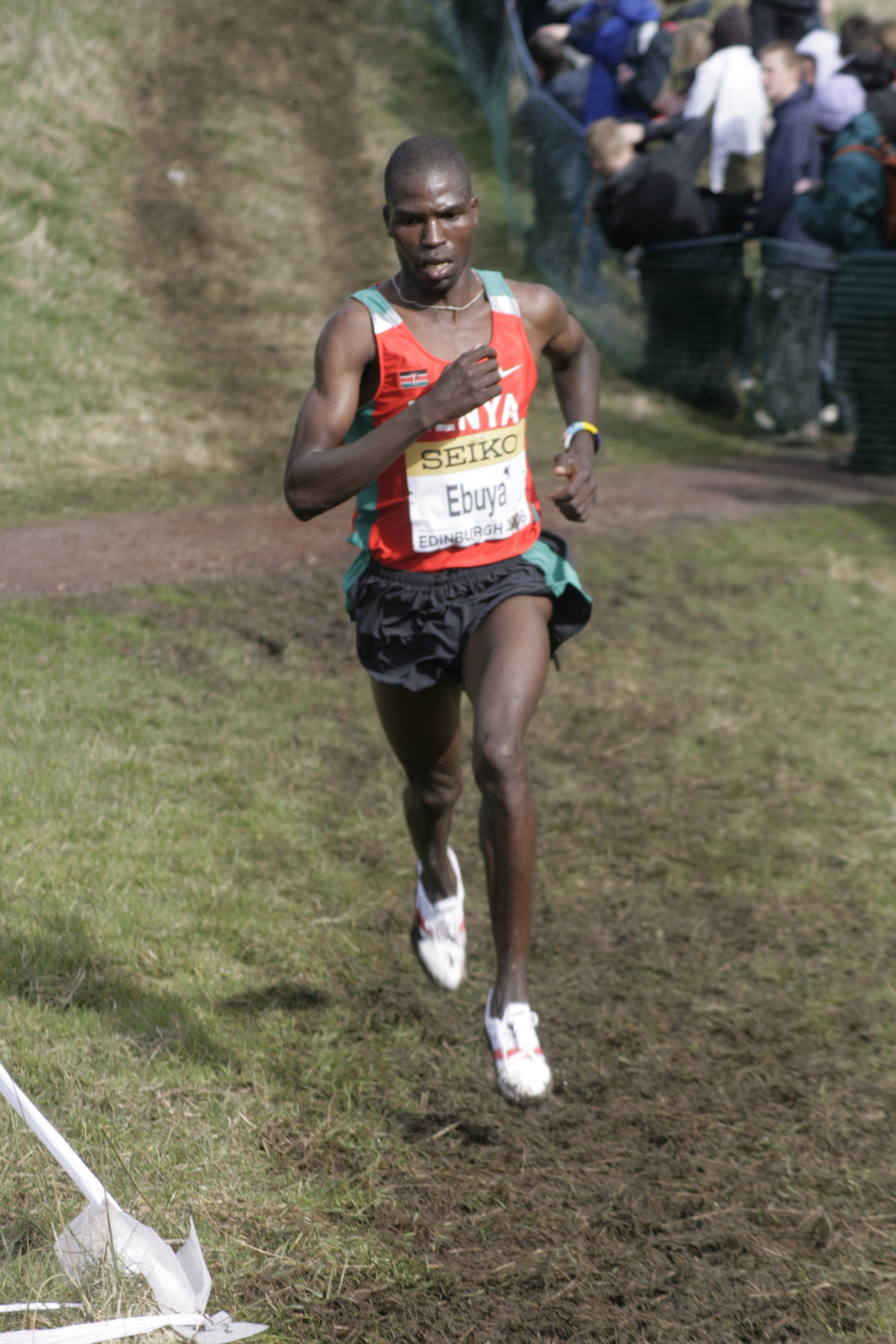
Joseph Ebuya won the men's race in 2007.

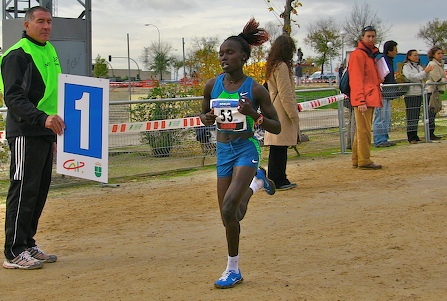
The 2006 winner Vivian Cheruiyot competing in Spain.

Edition	Year	Men's winner	Time (m:s)	Women's winner	Time (m:s)
I	1994	Rahmouni Tijani (MAR)	24:38	Sally Barsosio (KEN)	11:31 (5 km)
II	1995	Manuel Pancorbo (ESP)	23:44	Ana Isabel Alonso (ESP)	13:45
III	1996	Omar Errachidi (MAR)	24:41	Jacqueline Martín (ESP)	13:08
IV	1997	Million Wolde (ETH)	26:42	Jacqueline Martín (ESP)	14:02
V	1998	Laban Kipkemboi (KEN)	25:12	Yimenashu Taye (ETH)	14:25
VI	1999	John Kosgei (KEN)	29:03	Naomi Mugo (KEN)	16:49
VII	2000	Salim Kipsang (KEN)	26:05	Margaret Ngotho (KEN)	15:37
VIII	2001	Tom Nyariki (KEN)	26:36	Rose Cheruiyot (KEN)	19:25
IX	2002	Charles Kamathi (KEN)	26:04	Zulema Fuentes-Pila (ESP)	20:24
X	2003	Benjamin Limo (KEN)	27:35	Merima Denboba (ETH)	20:44
XI	2004	Zersenay Tadese (ERI)	25:52	Werknesh Kidane (ETH)	19:24
XII	2005	Boniface Songok (KEN)	26:24	Rose Jepchumba (KEN)	19:47
XIII	2006	Ali Abdalla (ERI)	30:10	Vivian Cheruiyot (KEN)	27:38
XIV	2007	Joseph Ebuya (KEN)	28:58	Meselech Melkamu (ETH)	27:24
XV	2008	Leonard Komon (KEN)	29:11	Jane Kiptoo (KEN)	26:40
XVI	2009	Gebregziabher Gebremariam (ETH)	30:21	Linet Masai (KEN)	27:06
XVII	2010	Joseph Ebuya (KEN)	29:57	Dina Lebo Phalula (RSA)	28:18
XVIII	2011	Vincent Chepkok (KEN)	29:49	Priscah Jeptoo (KEN)	27:28
XIX	2012	Emmanuel Bett (KEN)	30:48	Nazaret Weldu (ETH)	28:36
XX	2013	Dickson Huru (UGA)	30:07	Marta Tigabea (ETH)	28:06
XXI	2014	Timothy Toroitich (UGA)	29:58	Mercy Cherono (KEN)	27:38
XXII	2015	Timothy Toroitich (UGA)	29:42	Linet Masai (KEN)	28:08
XXIII	2016	Timothy Toroitich (UGA)	29:09	Alice Aprot (KEN)	26:17
XXIV	2017	Jacob Kiplimo (UGA)	28:37	Alice Aprot (KEN)	26:34
XXV	2018	Jacob Kiplimo (UGA)	30:11	Gloriah Kite (KEN)	28:47
XXVI	2019	Maxwell Rotich (UGA)	29:16	Mariana Machado (POR)	27:49
XXVII	2021	Rodrigue Kwizera (BDI)	28:57	Lucy Mawia (KEN)	27:22
XXVIII	2022	Thierry Ndikumwenayo (BDI)	28:34	Lucy Mawia (KEN)	27:02
XXIX	2023	Rodrigue Kwizera (BDI)	25:36	Likina Amebaw (ETH)	29:44
XXX	2024	Rodrigue Kwizera (BDI)	23:17	Mercy Chepkemoi (KEN)	26:48
XXXI	2025	Mathew Kipsang (KEN)	23:10	Likina Amebaw (ETH)	27:25
XXXII	2026	Mathew Kipsang (KEN)	23:49	Charity Cherop (UGA)	26:19
