= Rodrigue Kwizera =

Burundian-born Spanish long-distance runner

Personal information
- Nationality: Burundian
- Born: 10 October 1999 (age 27)

Sport
- Country: Burundi (until 2023); Spain (since 2026)
- Sport: Athletics
- Events: Long-distance running, Cross country

Rodrigue Kwizera (born 10 October 1999) is a Burundian-born Spanish long-distance runner.

== Personal life ==
Kwizera moved to Spain in 2019 and, in 2025, requested Spanish nationality. He stopped representing Burundi in 2023, to comply with the 3-years rule without representing another country in order to be able to compete for a new one. In May 2026, the Council of Ministers granted him the Spanish nationality.

== Career ==
In 2017, Rodrigue Kwizera competed in the senior men's race at the IAAF World Cross Country Championships in Kampala, Uganda. He placed 39th.

He competed in the senior men's race at the 2019 IAAF World Cross Country Championships held in Aarhus, Denmark, and finished in 11th place. That year, he also represented Burundi at the 2019 African Games staged in Rabat, Morocco. He competed in the men's 5000 metres and placed 16th. Kwizera finished 16th in the men's 10,000 metres at the 2019 World Athletics Championships held in Doha.

He won the 2021–22 World Cross Country Tour. He placed 16th in the 10,000 m at the 2022 World Athletics Championships in Eugene, Oregon.

In April 2025, He won the Prague Half Marathon in a Burundi National record time of 58:54. In October 2025, he beat this time at the Valencia Half Marathon crossing the line in 58:39, finishing in second place to Ethiopia's Yomif Kejelcha.

In March 2026, he retained his title at the 2026 Prague Half Marathon with a course record of 58:16, improving on the previous best set by Sabastian Sawe in 2024.

In October 2026, he won the 2026 Valencia Half Marathon with a time of 58:03.

== Achievements ==
=== Circuit wins and titles ===
- World Cross Country Tour: 2021–22
  - 2021–22 (5): Cross Internacional de Soria, Cross de San Sebastián, Cross Internacional de Itálica, Cross Internacional de Venta de Baños, Almond Blossom Cross Country
  - 2022–23 (4): Cross Internacional Zornotza, Cross Internacional de la Constitución, Cross Internacional de Venta de Baños, Campaccio

=== Personal bests ===
- 5000 metres – 13:20.17 (Castellón 2022)
- 10,000 metres – 27:25.47 (Maia 2022)

Road

- 10 kilometres – 26:56 (Herzogenaurach 2022) NR
