= 2026 African Championships in Athletics – Men's 10,000 metres =

Men's 10,000 metres at the 2026 African Championships in Athletics
- Venue: Legon Sports Stadium
- Location: Accra, Ghana
- Dates: 13 May
- Competitors: 16 from 10 nations
- Winning time: 28:30.44

Medalists
gold medal	Kevin Chesang	Kenya
silver medal	Hagos Eyob	Ethiopia
bronze medal	Silas Senchura	Kenya

The men's 10,000 metres event at the 2026 African Championships in Athletics was held on 13 May in Accra, Ghana.

== Results ==
Rank	Athlete	Nationality	Time	Notes
1st place, gold medalist(s)	Kevin Chesang	Kenya	28:30.44	
2nd place, silver medalist(s)	Hagos Eyob	Ethiopia	28:30.57	
3rd place, bronze medalist(s)	Silas Senchura	Kenya	28:32.66	
4	Dan Kibet	Uganda	28:34.97	
5	Hani Idriss Hersi	Djibouti	28:41.44	
6	Saymon Amanuel	Djibouti	28:41.92	
7	Tadese Worku	Ethiopia	28:46.88	
8	Dawit Seare	Eritrea	28:57.83	
9	Dolphine Chelimo	Uganda	28:59.03	
10	William Amponsa	Ghana	29:02.52	
11	Mathew Kipkoech Kipchumba	Kenya	29:16.00	
12	Benjamin Fernandi	Tanzania	29:31.48	
13	Samuel Simba Cherop	Uganda	30:04.96	
14	António Teko	Angola	32:05.50	
	Kaouding Savane	Senegal	DNF	
	Francisco Mendes Cristiano	Guinea-Bissau	DNF	
	Matayo Sombi	Tanzania	DNS	
	Nahay John Wele	Tanzania	DNS	
	Simon Mebrahtu	Eritrea	DNS	
	Gemechu Dida	Ethiopia	DNS	
