= Athletics at the 2026 Commonwealth Games – Women's 10,000 metres =

Women's 10,000 metres at the 2026 Commonwealth Games
- Venue: Scotstoun Stadium, Glasgow
- Dates: 27 July 2026 (final)
- Competitors: 17 from 9 nations
- Winning time: 31:39.32

Medalists
gold medal	Rose Davies	Australia
silver medal	Diana Wanza	Kenya
bronze medal	Florence Niyonkura	Rwanda

The women's 10,000 metres at the 2026 Commonwealth Games, as part of the athletics programme, took place at the Scotstoun Stadium on 27 July 2026. The event was a straight final, featuring seventeen competitors from nine nations.

The 2022 champion, Eilish McColgan of Scotland was due to take part in the race to defend her title but pulled out due to recovery from a toe fracture.

== Records ==
Prior to this competition, the existing world and Games records were as follows:

Women's 10,000 Metres
World record	28:54.10	Beatrice Chebet (KEN)	25 May 2024	Eugene, United States
Commonwealth record	28:54.10	Beatrice Chebet (KEN)	25 May 2024	Eugene, United States
Games record	30:48.50	Eilish McColgan (SCO)	3 Aug 2022	Birmingham England

== Schedule ==
The schedule was as follows:

Date	Time	Round
27 July 2026	18:30	Final

All times are United Kingdom time (UTC+1)

== Results ==
=== Final ===
The straight final of the 10,000 metres was scheduled for the evening of 27 July 2026.

Place	Athlete	Nation	Time	Notes
1st place, gold medalist(s)	Rose Davies	Australia	31:39.32	SB
2nd place, silver medalist(s)	Diana Wanza	Kenya	31:50.13	
3rd place, bronze medalist(s)	Florence Niyonkura	Rwanda	31:55.47	
4	Esther Chebet	Uganda	31:55.70	PB
5	Lauren Ryan	Australia	31:59.41	SB
6	Joy Cheptoek	Uganda	32:01.92	SB
7	Miriam Chebet	Kenya	32:12.97	
8	Rebecca Chelangat	Uganda	32:16.28	SB
9	Megan Keith	Scotland	32:22.11	SB
10	Rebecca Mwangi	Kenya	32:36.12	
11	Izzy Fry	England	32:50.81	
12	Poppy Tank	England	32:50.83	
13	Florence Caron	Canada	32:59.51	
14	Nthabiseng Lekotoko	Lesotho	34:52.00	SB
