= Athletics at the 2026 Commonwealth Games – Women's 5000 metres =

Women's 5000 metres at the 2026 Commonwealth Games
- Venue: Scotstoun Stadium, Glasgow
- Dates: 29 July 2026 (final)
- Winning time: 14:44.53

Medalists
gold medal	Rose Davies	Australia
silver medal	Jessica Hull	Australia
bronze medal	Megan Keith	Scotland

The women's 5000 metres at the 2026 Commonwealth Games, as part of the athletics programme, will take place at the Scotstoun Stadium on the evening of 29 July 2026. The event will be a straight final.

== Records ==
Prior to this competition, the existing world and Games records were as follows:

Women's 5000 Metres
World record	13:58.10	Beatrice Chebet (KEN)	5 Jul 2025	Eugene, United States
Commonwealth record	13:58.10	Beatrice Chebet (KEN)	5 Jul 2025	Eugene, United States
Games record	14:31.40	Paula Radcliffe (ENG)	28 July 2002	Manchester, England

== Entrants ==
The following national associations entered athletes in this event:

- Australia (3)
- Canada (1)
- England (2)
- Kenya (2)
- Scotland (3)
- South Africa (1)
- Wales (1)
- Uganda (2)
- Lesotho (1)

== Schedule ==
The event will be held as a straight final. The schedule is as follows:

Date	Time	Round
29 July 2026	18:30	Final

All times are United Kingdom time (UTC+1)

== Results ==
=== Final ===
The straight final of the 5000 metres occurred on the evening of 29 July 2026.

Place	Athlete	Nation	Time	Notes
1st place, gold medalist(s)	Rose Davies	Australia	14:44.53	SB
2nd place, silver medalist(s)	Jessica Hull	Australia	14:45.01	SB
3rd place, bronze medalist(s)	Megan Keith	Scotland	14:49.10	SB
4	Esther Chebet	Uganda	14:50.70	PB
5	Hannah Nuttall	England	14:51.34	SB
6	Caroline Nyaga	Kenya	14:54.00	
7	Linden Hall	Australia	14:55.28	
8	Tayla Kavanagh	South Africa	14:58.28	PB
9	Emeline Imanizabayo	Rwanda	14:59.92	NR
10	Joy Cheptoek	Uganda	15:00.97	
11	Innes FitzGerald	England	15:02.80	SB
12	Rebecca Chelangat	Uganda	15:07.20	PB
13	Parul Chaudhary	India	15:08.56	
14	Gabriela DeBues-Stafford	Canada	15:09.66	SB
15	Eloise Walker	Scotland	15:13.15	PB
16	Laura Muir	Scotland	15:19.75	
17	Sisilia Panga	Tanzania	15:43.43	PB
18	Rebecca Mwangi	Kenya	15:50.48	
19	Christa Cain	Isle of Man	16:51.46	PB
—	Hamida Mussa	Tanzania	DNF	
—	Nthabiseng Lekotoko	Lesotho	DNS	
