= Joan Chepkurui =

Kenyan runner (born 2007)

Personal information
- Nationality: Kenya
- Born: 8 July 2007 (age 18)

Sport
- Sport: Athletics
- Event(s): long-distance running, Cross country running

Achievements and titles
- Personal best(s): 3000m: 9:32.65 (Nairobi, 2025)
Medal record
Women's athletics
Representing Kenya
World Cross Country Championships
Silver medal – second place	2026 Tallahassee	U20 team

Joan Chepkurui (born 8 July 2007) is a Kenyan long-distance and cross county runner.

== Biography ==
Chepkurui placed fourth in the Kenyan Trials for Africa U18 & U20 Championships, in June 2025, over 3000 metres. In December 2025, Chepkurui won the 6 km U20 women's title at the Chepsaita Cross Country in Uasin Gishu County.

Chepkurui was selected for the Kenyan team for the U20 race at the 2026 World Athletics Cross Country Championships in Tallahassee, where she placed sixth overall, winning a silver medal with the Kenyan team, alongside Cynthia Chepkirui, Mercy Chepngeno Mageso, and Miriam Kibet.
