= Miriam Kibet =

Kenyan runner (born 2007)

Personal information
- Full name: Miriam Chemutai Kibet
- Nationality: Kenya
- Born: 21 February 2007 (age 19)

Sport
- Sport: Athletics
- Events: long-distance running, Cross country running

Achievements and titles
- Personal bests: 1500m: 4:19.51 (Nairobi, 2024); 3000m: 9:08.05 (Nairobi, 2025); 5000m: 16:10.73 (Nairobi, 2025); 10,000m: 33:22.15 (Nairobi, 2025)
Medal record
Women's athletics
Representing Kenya
World Cross Country Championships
Silver medal – second place	2026 Tallahassee	U20 team

Miriam Chemutai Kibet (born 21 February 2007) is a Kenyan long-distance and cross county runner.

== Biography ==
Chemutai was a finalist over 1500 metres at the 2024 World Athletics U20 Championships in Lima, Peru.

She was runner-up at the under-20 6 km women's race at the Kenyan Cross Country Championships in Eldoret on 25 October 2025, finishing behind Cynthia Chepkirui.

In December 2025, she was confirmed in the Kenyan team for the U20 race at the 2026 World Athletics Cross Country Championships in Tallahassee, where she placed eleventh overall, winning a silver medal with the Kenyan team, alongside Cynthia Chepkirui, Mercy Chepngeno Mageso, and Joan Chepkurui.

In July 2026, she placed seventh competing in the 10,000 metres at the 2026 Commonwealth Games in Glasgow, Scotland.
