= Brenda Kenei =

Kenyan long-distance runner

Brenda Jepchumba Kenei
Personal information
- Born: 24 December 2002 (age 23)

Sport
- Sport: Athletics
- Event(s): Long distance running, Cross country running
Medal record
Women's athletics
Representing Kenya
World Cross Country Championships
Silver medal – second place	2026 Tallahassee	Senior team

Brenda Jepchumba Kenei (born 24 December 2002) is a Kenyan cross country runner. She was runner-up at the 2025 Kenyan Cross Country Championships and was selected to represent Kenya at the 2026 World Athletics Cross Country Championships.

== Biography ==
On 5 October 2025, she was runner-up to Medina Eisa at the tRUNsylvania 10K – a World Athletics Elite Label road race in Brasov.

Competing at the Kenyan Cross Country Championships over 10 km in Eldoret on 25 October 2025, she finished runner-up to Maurine Chebor. She was subsequently selected to represent Kenya at the 2026 World Athletics Cross Country Championships. On 10 January 2026, she placed 37th overall at the Championships in Tallahassee.
