= Rory Leonard =

British athlete (born 2001)

Personal information
- Nationality: British (English)
- Born: 13 February 2001 (age 25)

Sport
- Sport: Athletics
- Events: 10,000 metres, cross country
- Club: Morpeth Harriers
Medal record
Men's Athletics
Representing Great Britain
European U23 Championships
Gold medal – first place	2023 Espoo	10,000 metres
European Cross Country Championships
Bronze medal – third place	2024 Antalya	Team
Gold medal – first place	2023 Brussels	U23 Team
Gold medal – first place	2022 Turin	U23 Team
Silver medal – second place	2021 Dublin	U23 team

Rory Leonard (born 13 February 2001) is a British track and field athlete who competes as a long distance runner. In 2023, he won gold at the European U23 Athletics Championships over 10,000 metres.

== Early and personal life ==
From Ampleforth, in Yorkshire, he attended The King Edward VI School, Morpeth. Leonard competed at the European Youth Olympics in 2018. From 2021, he attended Oklahoma State University where he studied English literature and philosophy. He runs for Morpeth Harriers. He was coached by his father Tony as a youngster, and both his parents competed collegiately at the University of Arkansas, with his mother Sharon winning an English Schools silver medal in cross country in the 1980s.

== Career ==
In 2019, he was English National under-20 cross country champion and subsequently raced for Great Britain at the World Cross Country Championships in Aarhus.

He finished 16th in 2021 and 11th in 2022 at the European Cross Country Championships. In 2023, he set personal best times over 3000m indoors (8:07.97) and 10,000m (28:21.30). That year, he won gold at the 2023 European Athletics U23 Championships over 10,000 metres in Espoo. He placed third in the 5 km race at the 2023 Great North Run in Newcastle upon Tyne in September 2023.

In February 2024, he set a new personal best time of 13:31 in Monaco over 5 km, which placed him seventh on the all time UK list. In April 2024, he lowered that personal best to 13:29.54 in Battersea. He ran a 10,000 metres personal best on the track in London in May 2024, running 27:38.39. That month, he was selected to run the 10,000 metres for Britain at the 2024 European Athletics Championships in Rome.

He was selected for the British team for the 2024 European Cross Country Championships in Antalya, Turkey where he finished ninth and won the bronze medal in the team race with Great Britain.

Leonard broke the British men's 10 km road race record at the 10K Valencia, Spain, on 12 January 2025, recording a time of 27 minutes 38 seconds, which took six seconds off the previous mark set by Mo Farah in 2010 and equalled by Emile Cairess in 2022.

He was selected for the British team for the European Road Running Championships in Leuven, Belgium, in April 2025. In the men's 10 km road race he finished 14th in 28:33.

Leonard finished third over 5000 metres at the 2025 UK Athletics Championships in Birmingham. He had a second-place finish at the 2025 Liverpool Cross Challenge on 22 November to gain automatic selection for the 2025 European Cross Country Championships. At the championships, he narrowly missed a bronze medal with the British men’s team placing fourth, and Leonard placing 17th in the individual race. That month, he was named in the British team for the 2026 World Athletics Cross Country Championships in Tallahassee. In April, he placed third in 27:57 on the road at the 10 km en Ruta Villa de Laredo in Spain, finishing behind Biniam Mehary and Hagos Eyob of Ethiopia. On 14 November 2026, Leonard placed third at the Sparkassen Cross Pforzheim in Germany, a Gold meeting on the 2026-27 World Athletics Cross Country Tour.
