= Jackson Spencer (runner) =

American long-distance runner (born 2007)

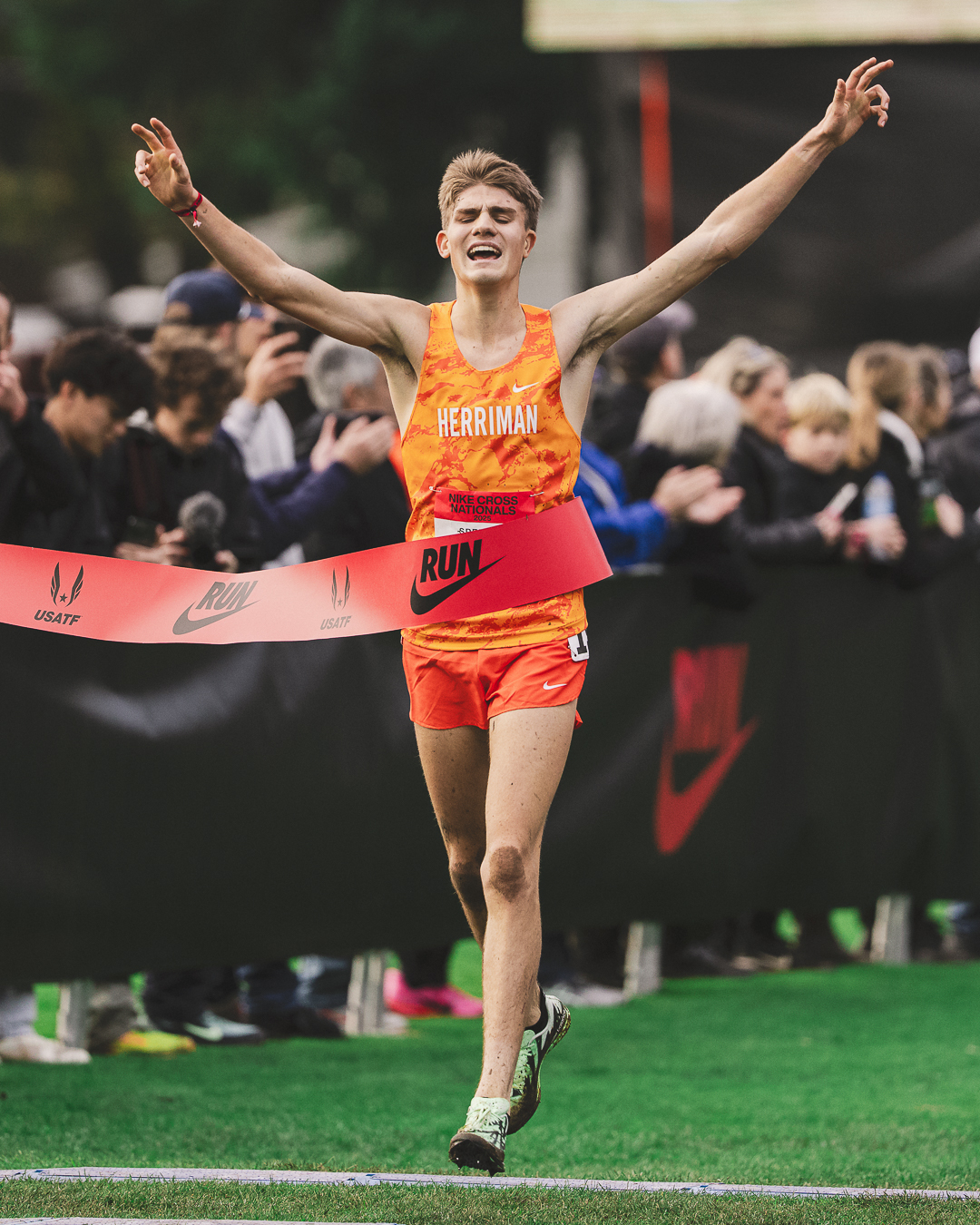
- Jackson Spencer winning 2025 Nike Cross Nationals

Personal information
- Born: 29 November 2007 (age 18)

Sport
- Sport: Athletics
- Events: Long-distance running, Cross country running
Medal record
Men's athletics
Representing United States
World Cross Country Championships
Bronze medal – third place	2026 Tallahassee	Junior team

Jackson Spencer (born 29 November 2007) is an American long-distance and cross country runner.

== Biography ==
From Utah, Jackson attended Syracuse High School and Herriman High School. Competing on the roads, he won the Deseret News 5k in Utah as a seventeen-year-old in July 2025, with a time of 14:37.

Competing in cross country at the Clovis Invitational at Woodward Park in Fresno in October 2025, Jackson ran seven seconds faster than any high schooler had previously run on the course, breaking German Fernandez record from 2007 and nine seconds faster than Nico Young, who ran 14:26 in 2019. Later that month, Spencer won the Utah state cross country title, running the fastest time recorded at the Utah state championships, breaking the previous best time set by Casey Clinger. After this, he won the NXR Southwest in Arizona.

On 6 December 2025, Jackson won the Nike National Cross Country Championships. On 13 December 2025, Spencer won the Brooks XC Championship in San Diego to complete the national high school cross country double, the first man to do so since Lukas Verzbicas in 2010. The win also concluded an unbeaten domestic cross country season for Spencer. He was subsequently selected to represent the United States at the 2026 World Athletics Cross Country Championships in Tallahassee, for his debut over the 8 km distance. He was the second American finisher in the race, behind Tyler Daillak, placing eighteenth overall, helping the American team to win the bronze medal.

In March 2026, Spencer won the New Balance Nationals Indoor championship title over 5000 metres with 13:54.70, the second-fastest all-time American high school indoor time. The following month in Portland, Jackson ran under four minutes in the mile run, finishing in 3:58.17. On 18 June, Jackson set a meet record in the 5,000 meters at New Balance Nationals Outdoor, running 14:08.02. Spencer won at the Arcadia Invitational over 3200 metres in an American high school national record of 8:31.80 and ran 3:57.24 to win the 2026 St. Louis Festival of Miles in June, to move to fifth place on the all-time US list in the mile.

== Personal life ==
In 2025, Spencer committed to attend Brigham Young University. He is a member of the Church of Jesus Christ of Latter-day Saints, and is currently serving his 2-year mission before he will compete for the Cougars.
