= Denis Kipkoech =

Kenyan runner (born 2006)

Personal information
- Full name: Denis Kipkoech Kemboi
- Nationality: Kenya
- Born: 5 June 2006 (age 20)

Sport
- Sport: Athletics
- Event: long distance running

Achievements and titles
- Personal bests: 3000m: 7:48.48 (Nairobi, 2024); 5000m: 13:03.17 (Zagreb, 2025)
Medal record
Men's athletics
Representing Kenya
World U20 Championships
Silver medal – second place	2024 Lima	3000m
African U20 Championships
Gold medal – first place	2025 Abeokuta	5000m
World Cross Country Championships
Silver medal – second place	2026 Tallahassee	Senior team

Denis Kipkoech Kemboi (born 5 June 2006) is a Kenyan long-distance runner. He was a silver medalist at the 2024 World Athletics U20 Championships over 3000 metres.

== Biography ==
He ran a personal best 7:48.48 for the 3000 metres to finish runner-up to Clinton Kimutai Ngetich at the Kenyan U20 Championships national trials in June 2024. He won the silver medal behind Norwegian Andreas Fjeld Halvorsen in the 3000 metres at the 2024 World Athletics U20 Championships in Lima, Peru in August 2024, finishing in a time of 8:20.79, after leading the race on the final lap.

He ran a personal best 13:03.17 to win the 5000 metres at the World Athletics Continental Tour Gold meeting in Zagreb on 24 May 2025, finishing ahead of compatriot Andrew Kiptoo Alamisi and Ethiopia's Biniam Mehary, moving from third to first place in the last 100 metres. He finished in sixth place over 5000 metres in Stockholm at the 2025 BAUHAUS-galan event, part of the 2025 Diamond League. In June 2025, he won the Kenyan under-20 trials over 5000 metres. He subsequently won the gold medal in the 5000 metres at the African U20 Championships the following month. He had a top-ten finish over 5000 metres at the 2025 Athletissima in wet conditions in Lausanne, Switzerland, in August 1025.

He placed third behind Daniel Ebenyo and Kevin Chesang at the Kenyan Cross Country Championships over 10 km in Eldoret on 25 October 2025. He finished third behind Rodrigue Kwizera and Andrew Alamisi at the Cross Internacional de Itálica in Spain, in November 2025, a World Athletics Cross Country Tour Gold race. He was subsequently selected to represent Kenya at the 2026 World Athletics Cross Country Championships in Tallahassee, United States, where he placed ninth overall, winning the silver medal with Kenya in the team competition.
