= Andrew Alamisi =

Kenyan athlete (born 2007)

Personal information
- Full name: Andrew Kiptoo Alamisi
- Nationality: Kenyan
- Born: 28 August 2007 (age 19)

Sport
- Sport: Athletics
- Event: Long distance running

Achievements and titles
- Personal bests: 3000 m: 7:36.24 (Budapest, 2025); 5000 m: 13:03.30 (Zagreb, 2025)
Medal record
Men's athletics
Representing Kenya
World U20 Championships
Gold medal – first place	2024 Lima	5000m
Commonwealth Youth Games
Silver medal – second place	2023 Trinbago	1500 m
Silver medal – second place	2023 Trinbago	3000 m
World Cross Country Championships
Gold medal – first place	2026 Tallahassee	U20 team
Bronze medal – third place	2026 Tallahassee	U20 race

Andrew Kiptoo Alamisi (born 28 August 2007) is a Kenyan long-distance runner. In 2024, he became world U20 champion over 5000 metres.

== Biography ==
He won silver over both 1500 metres and 3000 metres at the 2023 Commonwealth Youth Games in Trinidad and Tobago in August 2023.

He trains in Iten in Elgeyo-Marakwet County, Kenya, where he is coached by Erick Kogo. On 27 August 2024, he won gold at the 2024 World Athletics U20 Championships in the men's 5000 metres in Lima, Peru.

He ran a personal best to finish in the runner-up spot in 13:03.30 over 5000 metres at the World Athletics Continental Tour Gold meeting in Zagreb on 24 May 2025, finishing behind compatriot Denis Kipkoech but ahead of Ethiopia's Biniam Mehary. He ran in Stockholm at the 2025 BAUHAUS-galan event, part of the 2025 Diamond League, in June 2025, finishing eleventh over 5000 metres.

Alamisi was runner-up to Rodrigue Kwizera at the Cross Internacional de Itálica in Spain, in November 2025, a World Athletics Cross Country Tour Gold race. In December, he was selected to represent Kenya in the U20 race at the 2026 World Athletics Cross Country Championships in Tallahassee, United States, where he won the team gold medal and individual bronze as part of a Kenyan clean sweep of the individual medals, alongside Frankline Kibet and Emmanuel Kiprono.

In July 2026, he placed tenth competing in the 5000 metres at the 2026 Commonwealth Games in Glasgow, Scotland. In November, he placed seventh at the 2026 Cross Internacional de Itálica in Seville.

== Personal life ==
He was a student at St. Peter's Keberesi Secondary School, Kisii County.
