= Asayech Ayichew =

Ethiopian track and field athlete

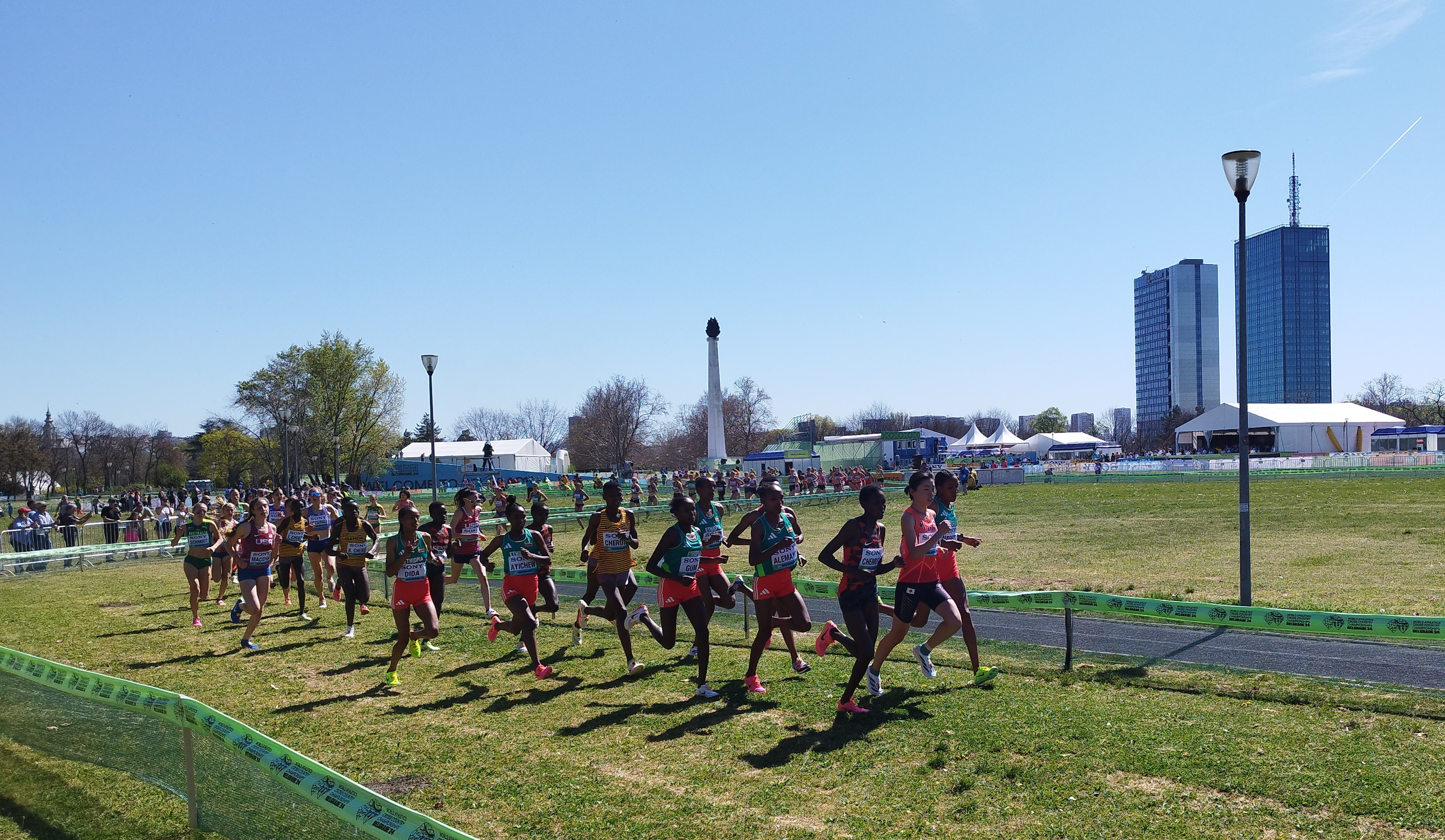
- Ayichew at the 2024 World Athletics Cross Country Championships

Personal information
- Nationality: Ethiopian
- Born: 3 April 2005 (age 21)

Sport
- Sport: Athletics
- Event: Long-distance running
Medal record
Women's athletics
Representing Ethiopia
World Cross Country Championships
Gold medal – first place	2026 Tallahassee	Senior team
Gold medal – first place	2024 Belgrade	Junior team
Silver medal – second place	2024 Belgrade	Junior race

Asayech Ayichew (born 3 April 2005) is an Ethiopian long-distance runner.

== Biography ==
In May 2022 Asayech Ayichew won the women's Under-20 5000m race in 17:10.02 at the East Africa Games.

In September 2023, she made her Diamond League debut in the 3000 metres in Xiamen.

In November 2023, she finished second at the Cross Internacional de Soria, a Gold meeting on the World Athletics Cross Country Tour, in Alcobendas, Spain.

In March 2024, she won silver in the U20 individual and gold in the team U20 race at the 2024 World Athletics Cross Country Championships in Serbia.

She ran a personal best 29:43 to finish fourth in the 10K Valencia road race on 12 January 2025, this time placed her inside the top 10 on the world all-time list. She ran a personal best 14:31.88 for the 5000 metres at the 2025 Xiamen Diamond League event in China, in April 2025. She ran 14:33.20 for a top-ten finish over 5000m at the 2025 Prefontaine Classic on 5 July. On 12 July 2025, she ran a 10,000 metres personal best time of 30:47.24 at the Sunset Tour Los Angeles, finishing second behind race winner Senayet Getachew.

In November 2025, Ayichew won the Jan Meda International Cross Country and was announced in the Ethiopian team for the 2026 World Athletics Cross Country Championships in Tallahassee, placing fourth in the individual race and winning the gold medal in the team event, with Getachew, Aleshign Baweke and Alem Tsadik. On 12 April 2026, she won the women's race at the Cherry Blossom 10 Mile in Washington DC in a time of 50:37. In May, she ran a personal best 14:26.41 for the 5000 m at the 2026 Shanghai Diamond League.

In November 2026, Ayichew won in 45:29, the second fastest time in history in a standalone 15km, at the at the Garmin Zevenheuvelenloop, or Seven Hills Run, in Nijmegen, Netherlands.
