= Florence Caron =

Canadian long-distance runner (born 2000)

Personal information
- Born: 30 December 2000 (age 25)

Sport
- Sport: Athletics
- Events: Long-distance running, Cross country running

Florence Caron (born 30 December 2000) is a Canadian long-distance runner. She has won national titles in the 10,000 metres and the 10k run.

== Biography ==
From La Malbaie, Quebec, Caron attended Universite Laval before transferring to Penn State University in the United States, in 2023.

Initially a middle-distance runner, Caron transitioned permanently to longer distances at Penn State, finishing with eleventh place finishes at both the Big Ten Cross Country Championships and Mid-Atlantic Regional Championships. The following year, Caron won the Big Ten Conference titles over both 5000 metres and 10,000 metres prior to finishing 14th overall in the 10,000m at the NCAA Championships, and going on to place 19th at the NCAA Cross Country Championships, an improvement of over 150 places from the previous year.

In 2025, Caron finished eleventh at the NCAA Championships in the 10,000m race, and lowered her personal best for the distance to 32:23.71. She then won her first Canadian national title at the 2025 Canadian 10,000m Championships in Guelph, Ontario in June, running 33:18.84, and signed an NIL (Name, Image and Likeness) deal with Hoka. That year, she ran 1:11:57 at the 2025 Athletics Canada Half-Marathon Championships in Edmonton, finishing third overall and winning the silver medal behind the national marathon record holder Natasha Wodak in the Canadian championship.

At the Mid-Atlantic regionals on 15 November 2025, Caron placed fourth, before placing fourteenth overall at the 2025 NCAA Cross Country Championship, helping Penn State to a top-ten finish in the team race. Competing at the 2025 Canadian Cross Country Championships she finished third overall. In January 2026, she made her senior international debut representing Canada at the 2026 World Athletics Cross Country Championships in Tallahassee, placing 57th overall.

Having graduated as the Penn State University record holder over 5000 m and 10,000 m, Caron began her professional career with Hoka Northern Arizona Elite, working under head coach Jack Mullaney, based in Flagstaff, Arizona. In May 2026, Caron won her first Athletics Canada title in the 10k run, winning at the Ottawa 10-K, having ran 32:31 in her road debut at the distance. A few days later, Caron defended her Canadian 10,000 metres title. She competed in the 10,000 metres at the 2026 Commonwealth Games in Glasgow, Scotland. Competing in the half marathon at the 2026 World Athletics Road Running Championships in Copenhagen, she ran a personal-best 1:11:03.

== Personal life ==
She is married to fellow Penn State athlete Olivier Desmeules.
