= Lauren Ryan =

Australian athlete

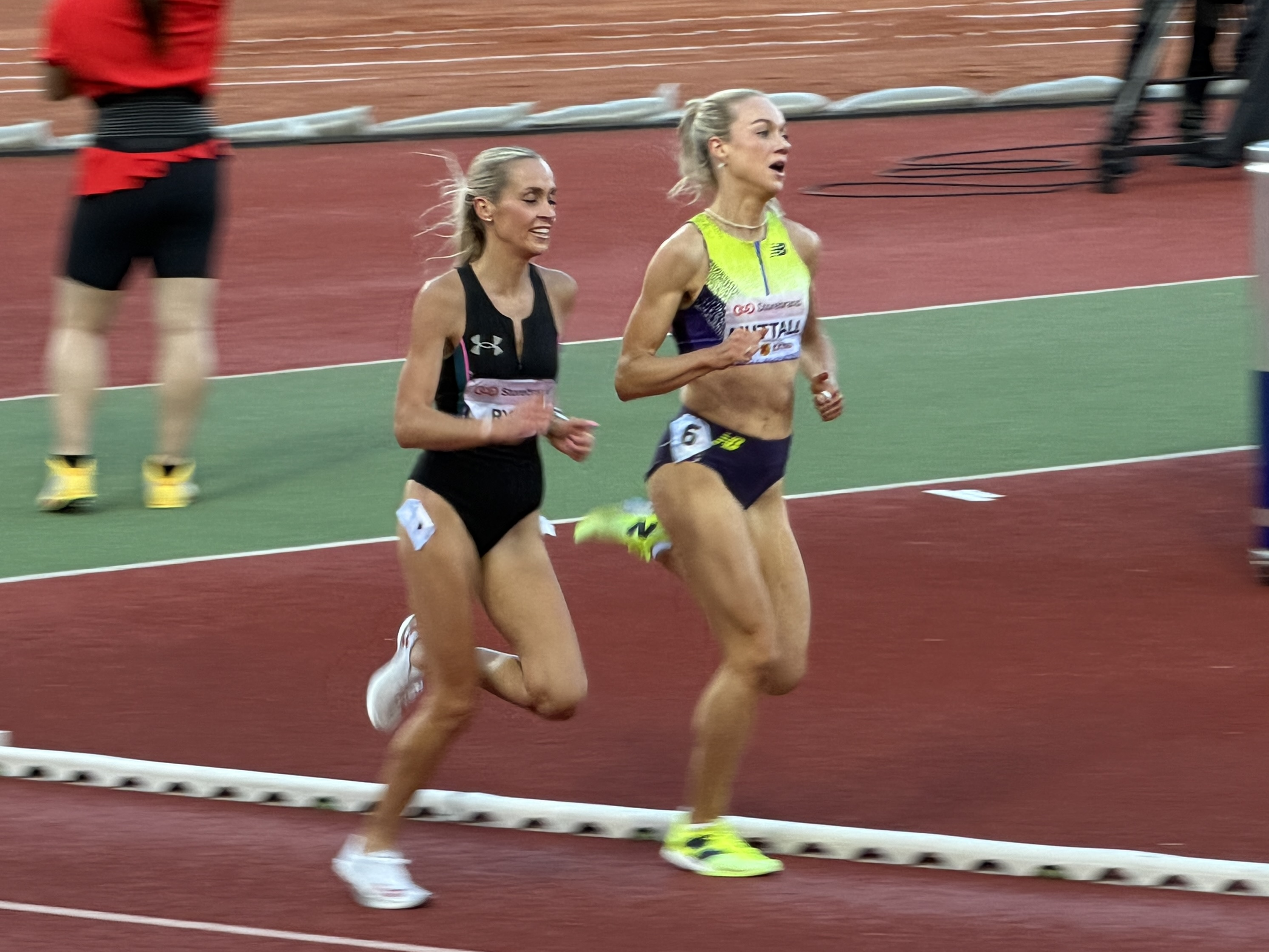
- Ryan at the 2026 Bislett Games

Personal information
- Nationality: Australian
- Born: 15 March 1998 (age 28)
- Height: 157 cm (5 ft 2 in)
- Weight: 50 kg (110 lb)

Sport
- Sport: Athletics
- Event: Long distance running

Achievements and titles
- Personal bests: 1500 m: 4:03.79 (Pfungstadt, 2025); Mile: 4:26.17i (Winston-Salem, 2026); 3000 m: 8:33.66 (Oslo, 2026); 5000 m: 14:40.39 (Oordegem, 2025); 10,000 m: 30:35.66 (San Juan Capistrano, 2024)

Lauren Ryan (born 15 March 1998) is an Australian track and field athlete who competes as a long-distance runner. She is the Australian national record holder over 10,000m.

== Early life ==
From Melbourne, Ryan attended Geelong Grammar School. Competing for Florida State University she finished fourth in the 3000m at the NCAA Indoor Championships in 2022.

== Career ==
Based in Baltimore, Maryland, Ryan made her Australian senior team debut at the 2022 World Athletics Indoor Championships.

She was selected to represent Australia in the 5000m at the 2023 World Athletics Championships in Budapest in August 2023 and, in October 2023, Ryan represented Australia at the 2023 World Athletics Road Running Championships held in Riga, Latvia. She then won the Pandora 10k in Baltimore.

Ryan won the Australian title over 10,000m in Melbourne in December 2023, running 32:54.00.

On 27 January 2024, competing in Boston, Massachusetts, she set a new Australian indoor 5000m record of 15:17:79. The following week, she ran a new 3000m personal best time of 8:42.31, which elevated her to the No. 2 indoor performer in her country’s history behind only Jessica Hull. Ryan ran 14:57.67 for 5,000m at the oversized Dempsey Indoor Facility in Seattle on 23 February 2024.

In March 2024, she set a new Australian national record time in the 10,000m, running 30:35.66 in San Juan Capistrano, California, taking two seconds from the previous record set 20 years earlier by Benita Willis.

She competed in the 10,000m at the 2024 Summer Olympics in Paris in August 2024, placing 13th in the final. She also competed in the 5000m at the Games without advancing to the final.

On 15 February 2025, Ryan ran her 3000m personal best at the 2025 Boston University Valentine Invitational, finishing in 8:41:80, just 0.03 seconds ahead of the second place finisher Doris Lemngole. She set a new personal best at the 2025 Kamila Skolimowska Memorial, in Poland, with a run of 8:37.56 for the 3000 metres.

In September 2025, she competed over 10,000 metres at the 2025 World Championships in Tokyo, Japan, placing ninth. In December, Ryan won the Australian 10,000 metres title in Melbourne in a time of 32:06.66.

On 10 January 2026, Ryan placed 13th overall at the 2026 World Athletics Cross Country Championships in Tallahassee, Florida, leading the Australian team to a fifth place overall finish. In June, Ryan ran a personal best of 8:33.66 for a top-ten finish in the 3000 metres at the 2026 Bislett Games. In July, she placed fifth competing in the 10,000 metres at the 2026 Commonwealth Games in Glasgow, Scotland.
