= Aleshign Baweke =

Ethiopian athlete (born 2006)

Personal information
- Born: 23 January 2006 (age 20)

Sport
- Sport: Athletics
- Event: Long distance running

Achievements and titles
- Personal bests: 3000m 8:23.81 (Monaco, 2026); 5000m 14:18.54 (Rome, 2026); 2 miles 9:20.02 (Eugene, 2026)
Medal record
Women's athletics
Representing Ethiopia
World Road Running Championships
Gold medal – first place	2026 Copenhagen	5k mixed team
World Cross Country Championships
Gold medal – first place	2026 Tallahassee	Senior team
World U20 Championships
Gold medal – first place	2024 Lima	3000 m

Aleshign Baweke (born 23 January 2006) is an Ethiopian long-distance runner. She won a gold medal at the 2024 World Athletics U20 Championships in the 3000 metres.

== Biography ==
She won a gold medal in Lima, Peru at the World Athletics U20 Championships in the 3000 metres, in August 2024.

Aleshign ran a personal best of 8:32.88 in the 3000 metres at the Rabat Diamond League, in May 2025. She finished eighth over 5000 metres at the 2025 Golden Gala in Rome on 6 June in a personal best of 14:27.33. She placed seventh over 5000 metres at the Prefontaine Classic on 5 July. She was third over 3000 metres at the Kamila Skolimowska Memorial, in Poland, with a run of 8:35.51 to finish behind Likina Amebaw and Faith Kipyegon. She was third over 5000 metres in the Diamond League at the Memorial Van Damme in Brussels, Belgium. She placed fifth over 3000 metres at the Diamond League Final in Zurich on 28 August. She was provisionally named as a reserve for the Ethiopian team for the 5000 metres at the 2025 World Athletics Championships in Tokyo, Japan, but did not race.

In January 2026, she was selected for the senior Ethiopian team to race at the 2026 World Athletics Cross Country Championships in Tallahassee , placing fifth in the individual race and winning the gold medal in the team event, with Senayet Getachew, Asayech Ayichew and Alem Tsadik. The following month, she ran 8:26.29 for the 3000 metres in Liévin, France finishing runner-up to compatriot Freweyni Hailu. She placed fourth over 3000 metres at the 2026 World Athletics Indoor Championships in Toruń, Poland, in March 2026.

On 4 June, she lowered her 5000 metres personal best to 14:18.54 finishing runner-up to compatriot Likina Amebaw at the 2026 Golden Gala in Rome. On 4 July, Aleshign won the two mile race at the Prefontaine Classic in 9:20.02. On 10 July, she ran a personal best 8:23.81 for 3000 metres at the Herculis Diamond League event in Monaco. On 23 August, she placed fifth over 5000 m in the Diamond League at the Kamila Skolimowska Memorial in Silesia, Poland. In September, she placed fifth over 5000 m at the inaugural World Ultimate Championship in Budapest. Competing in the 5k at the 2026 World Athletics Road Running Championships in Copenhagen in September 2026, she finished fifth in the women's race, claiming the team mixed gold medal alongside Likina Amebaw, Addisu Yihune and Mezgebu Sime.
