= Jacob Cann =

British long-distance runner

- Cann in 2026

Personal information
- Nationality: British
- Born: 22 December 2000 (age 25) Ashington, West Sussex, England

Sport
- Sport: Athletics
- Events: Middle-distance running, Long-distance running, Cross country running
- Club: Western Tempo

Achievements and titles
- Personal bests: 1500m: 3:38.25 (2025); Mile: 3:58.15 (2025); 3000m: 7:52.36 (2025); 5000m: 13:33.81 (2025); Road; 5km 13:52 (2025); 10km: 28:46 (2024)

Jacob Cann (born 22 December 2000) is a British middle-, long-distance, and cross country runner. He represented Great Britain at the 2026 World Athletics Cross Country Championships.

== Biography ==
Cann was educated at Lancaster University and the University of San Francisco, and is a member of Western Tempo. His parents, Neil and Diane, live in Cheltenham, where in January 2025 Cann set a new course record to win the Linda Franks 5 Mile road race. The following month, he was included in the England Team selected for the 2025 Cross Country Home Countries International. He also competed for England in races in Belgium and Spain in 2025. That summer, Cann set personal bests in every distance he ran on the track, including a maiden sub-four minute mile.

Cann placed fifth in the 9.6 km race at the 2025 Cardiff Cross Challenge in Wales, a gold race part of the World Athletics Cross Country Tour in November 2025. He then placed fourth at the Liverpool Cross Challenge later that month. He was subsequently selected for the Great Britain team to compete at the 2025 European Cross Country Championships in Lagoa, Portugal in December 2025, placing 29th overall. That month, he was selected for the 2026 World Athletics Cross Country Championships in Tallahassee, where he placed 71st overall in January 2026.

Cann competed over 3000 metres at the 2026 British Indoor Athletics Championships in Birmingham, placing fourth overall. On 7 March, he was runner-up to James Kingston at the UK Athletics Cross Challenge Final and UK Inter Counties Championships in Nottingham. In November, Cann placed fourth at the Cardiff Cross Challenge, a silver label race on the World Athletics Cross Country Tour.
