= Iven Moise =

Seychellois long-distance runner

Personal information
- Born: 18 October 1990 (age 35)

Sport
- Country: Seychelles
- Sport: Long-distance running

Iven Kevin Patrick Moise (born 18 October 1990) is a Seychellois long-distance runner.

In 2017, he competed in the senior men's race at the 2017 IAAF World Cross Country Championships held in Kampala, Uganda. He finished in 112th place.

In 2019, he competed in the senior men's race at the 2019 IAAF World Cross Country Championships held in Aarhus, Denmark. He finished in 130th place. In 2019, he also represented Seychelles at the 2019 African Games held in Rabat, Morocco. He competed in the men's 5000 metres and he finished in 25th place.
