= Robert Kiprop =

Kenyan long-distance runner

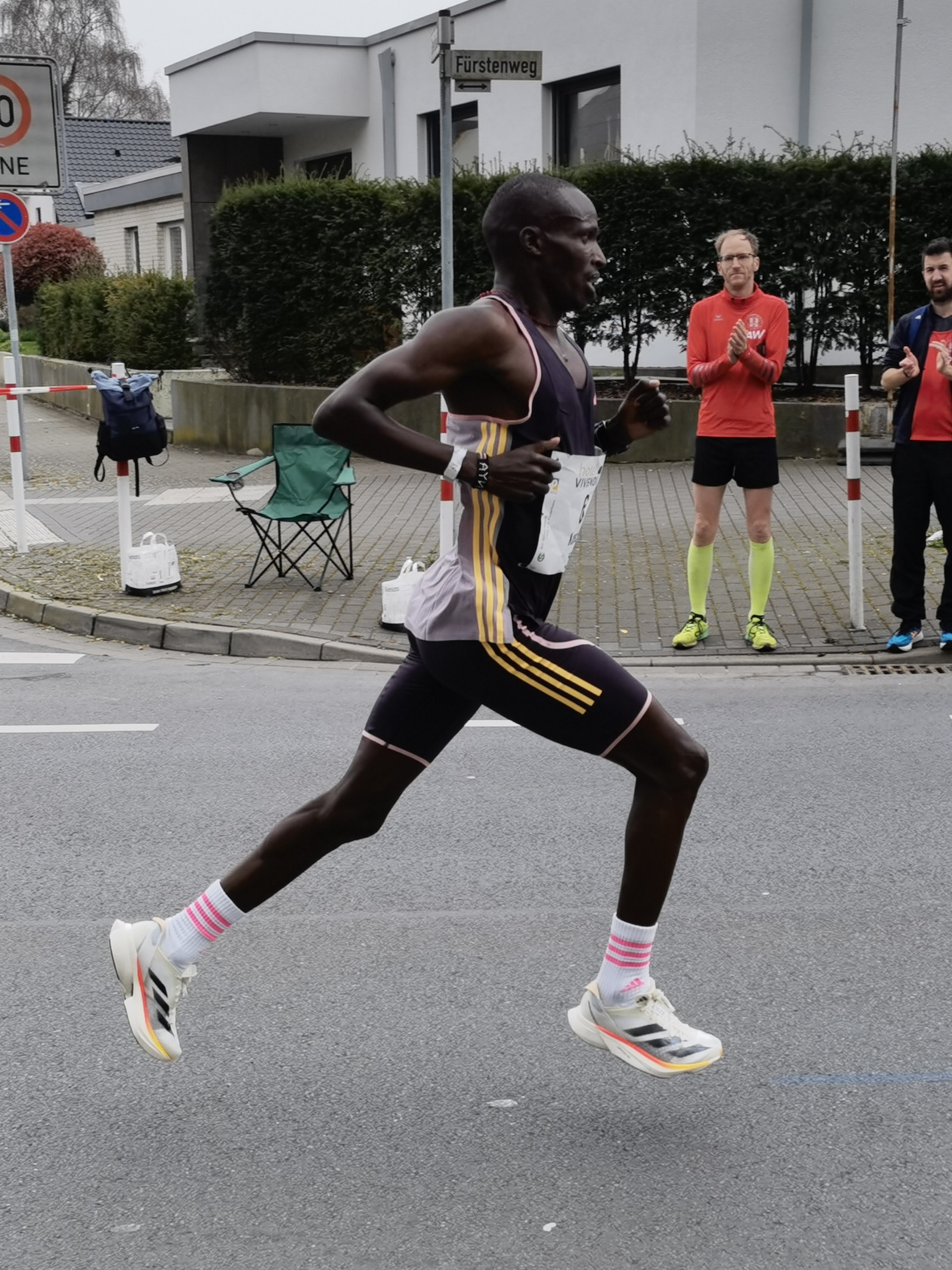
- Robert Kiprop at Paderborner Osterlauf 2024

Personal information
- Full name: Robert Kiprop Koech
- Nationality: Kenya
- Born: 25 February 1997 (29 years, 158 days old)
- Home town: Iten, Elgeyo-Marakwet County

Sport
- Sport: Athletics
- Events: 5000 metres 10K run

Achievements and titles
- National finals: 2017 Kenyan U20 XC; • 8 km, 17th; 2019 Kenyan AfrG Trials; • 5000m, 1st (gold); 2019 Kenyan Champs; • 5000m, 2nd (silver); 2020 Kenyan Champs; • 10 km, 13th; 2022 Kenyan Champs; • 5000m, 11th; 2023 Kenyan Champs; • 5000m, 2nd (silver)
- Personal bests: 5000m: 13:12.56 (2021); 10K 28:39 (2018)
Medal record
Men's athletics
Representing Kenya
World Cross Country Championships
Silver medal – second place	2026 Tallahassee	Senior team
African Games
Gold medal – first place	2019 Rabat	5000 m
- Updated on 10 December 2023

Robert Kiprop Koech (born 25 February 1997) is a Kenyan long-distance runner. He was the gold medalist in the 5000 m at the 2019 African Games.

== Biography ==
Kiprop is from the city of Iten in Elgeyo-Marakwet County, Kenya.

On 22 June 2019, Kiprop had a breakthrough to win the Kenyan African Games trials 5000 m in a time of 13:37.1. Despite winning the trials, Kiprop was initially excluded from the Kenyan African Games squad for not meeting the 13:30.00 national standard, but an exception was later made to include him. He would go on to win the championships in a time of 13:30.96, leading a Kenyan sweep of the medals in the event. Kiprop went on to finish second at the 2019 Kenyan World Championship trials, but he was not selected for the Kenyan team.

After a lull from 2020 to 2022, in late 2022 Kiprop had a resurgence in winning the 2022 Bangsaen10 road race. In 2023, he secured his second national podium placing, finishing runner-up in the 5000 m at the Kenyan champs. In late 2023 he said his target was to make the 2024 Olympic Games team for Kenya.

== Statistics ==
=== Personal bests ===
Event	Mark	Place	Competition	Venue	Date
5000 metres	13:12.56	8th	Golden Gala	Florence, Italy	10 June 2021
10K run	27:54	15th	Paderborn Osterlauf	Paderborn, Germany	30 March 2024
