= Poppy Tank =

British international athlete and national champion

- Tank in 2026

Personal information
- Nationality: British (English)
- Born: 5 December 1997 (age 28) Plymouth, Devon, England

Sport
- Sport: Track and field
- Event: 3000m steeplechase
- Club: City of Plymouth

Achievements and titles
- Personal bests: 3000m Steeplechase: 9:53.05 (Brussels, 2024)
Medal record
Representing Great Britain
European Cross Country Championships
Gold medal – first place	2023 Brussels	Team
Silver medal – second place	2024 Antalya	Team
Bronze medal – third place	2018 Tilburg	U23 Team
Bronze medal – third place	2019 Lisbon	U23 Team
British Athletics Championships
Gold medal – first place	2023 Manchester	3000m steeplechase

Poppy Tank (born 5 December 1997) is a British long-distance runner. She has represented Great Britain at senior level and in 2023 became the British champion in the 3000m steeplechase.

Competing for Great Britain she is a multiple-time medalist at the European Cross Country Championships.

== Biography ==
In 2018, Tank was part of the Great Britain U23 team that won the bronze medal at the 2018 European Cross Country Championships, held in Tilburg, Netherlands. She then won bronze as part of the British U23 team at the 2019 European Cross Country Championships in Lisbon.

Tank came to significant prominence in February 2023, after she was selected for the senior Great Britain team at the 2023 World Athletics Cross Country Championships held at Bathurst in Australia, where she competed in the senior women's race.

In July 2023, she won the national championship of Britain, winning the 3,000 metres steeplechase event at the 2023 British Athletics Championships, held in Manchester. She then competed at the Diamond League event in London in July 2023.

Tank was selected for Great Britain again for the 2023 European Cross Country Championships in Brussels during December 2023. She won gold as part of the successful British squad which won the team event. In January 2024, Tank ran a 10 km personal best of 32.34 on the road in Valencia.

In May 2024 in Brussels she ran a personal best 9:53.05 for the 3000m steeplechase. In November 2024, she finished third at the Liverpool Cross Challenge. She was selected for the British team for the 2024 European Cross Country Championships in Antalya, Turkey. In December 2024, she finished runner-up to Revée Walcott-Nolan in the Battersea New Years Eve 5k in London.

On 8 November 2025, she placed fifth in the women's 6.4 km race at the Cardiff Cross Challenge in Wales, a gold race part of the World Athletics Cross Country Tour. Tank had a second-place finish at the 2025 Liverpool Cross Challenge on 22 November to gain automatic selection for the 2025 European Cross Country Championships, where she placed 22nd the British team won the silver medal in the team event.

Tank was named in the British team for the 2026 World Athletics Cross Country Championships in Tallahassee, where she was the second British finisher after Megan Keith, placing 29th overall. Tank won the Battersea 10k in a personal best time of 32:10 in February 2026, and that month also placed third behind Izzy Fry and Eloise Walker over 5k in Battersea. She placed second in the British national 10,000 metres championship race in Loughborough on 17 May 2026, behind Izzy Fry. Tank competed for England in the 10,000 metres at the 2026 Commonwealth Games in Glasgow, Scotland. Two weeks later, Tank represented Great Britain in the 10,000 metres at the 2026 European Championships in Birmingham. On 8 November, Tank placed fourth at the Cardiff Cross Challenge, a silver label race on the World Athletics Cross Country Tour.

== Personal life ==
From Plymouth, in 2026 Tank was studying to complete a PHD at the University of Birmingham.
