= Wesley Kiptoo =

Kenyan long-distance runner (born 1999)

Personal information
- Nationality: American
- Born: 7 July 1999 (age 27) Marakwet, Kenya

Sport
- Sport: Athletics
- Events: Long distance running, Cross country running

Achievements and titles
- Personal bests: 3000m: 7:43.61 (Fayetteville, 2022); 5000m: 13:14.74 (Boston, 2021); 10000m: 27:37.29 (San Juan, 2020); 3000m s'chase: 8:31.82 (Manhattan, 2021); Road; 5km: 13:30 (Boston, 2023); 10km: 27:53 (Boston, 2024); 15km 42:10 (Jacksonville, 2025); Half Marathon: 1:00:34 (Houston, 2025); Marathon: 2:08:08 (Toronto, 2026)
Medal record
Men's athletics
Representing United States
World Road Running Championships
Bronze medal – third place	2026 Copenhagen	Half marathon team

Wesley Kiptoo (born 7 July 1999) is a Kenyan-born long-distance and cross country runner. After gaining American citizenship in 2025, he competed for the United States at the 2026 World Athletics Cross Country Championships. He won the 2026 USA Half Marathon Championships.

== Biography ==
From Marakwet District, Kenya, Kiptoo attended Transcend Academy, a school founded by former Boston Marathon champion, Wesley Korir. From 2018, he was educated in the United States, initially attending Colby Community College in Kansas.

Competing for Iowa State University, Kiptoo won the 2021 NCAA Indoor Championships over 5000 metres. Later that year, he won the steeplechase, 5000 metres and 10,000 metres at the Big 12 Conference finals. He finished his collegiate career holding Iowa State records in the indoor 3000 and 5000 metres as well as the outdoor 10,000 metres and the steeplechase. He also finished second and third overall in individual NCAA Cross Country races for Iowa.

Kiptoo turned professional and signed with the Hoka NAZ Elite running team in April 2022, training under coach Ben Rosario. He made his debut as a professional over 5000m at the 2022 Mt. SAC Relays. Kiptoo made his marathon debut at the 2023 Chicago Marathon, running 2:10:28. Kiptoo ran a personal best for the marathon of 2:08:54 at the 2025 Boston Marathon in April 2025.

On 1 March 2025, Kiptoo set a new course record at the Gate River Run in Jacksonville, running 42:10 to break the previous record for the course held by Todd Williams.

Kiptoo became an American citizen in September 2025. In October 2025, Kiptoo qualified to compete for the United States. On 12 October 2025, he ran 2:09:02 at the Chicago Marathon, finishing as the second placed American in the race behind American record holder Conner Mantz. In December, he had a third-place finish at the 2025 USA Cross Country Championships behind Parker Wolfe and Rocky Hansen to automatically gain selection for his American national team debut at the 2026 World Athletics Cross Country Championships in Tallahassee, where he was the second American finisher behind Wolfe, with fourteenth overall.

On 1 March 2026, he ran 1:01:15 to win the USA Half Marathon Championships in Atlanta, Georgia ahead of Hillary Bor and Ahmed Muhumed. He was subsequently included as part of the United States team for the World Road Running Championships in Copenhagen, Denmark, winning the bronze medal in the team competition.

== Personal life ==
He is married to Maribel, and they have children Natalia and Santos.
