= Jack Anstey =

Australian athlete

Jack Anstey (born 1997) is an Australian Professional Track and Field athlete. He holds the Australian and Oceanian Records in the indoor 1000m. He holds the second fastest indoor Mile by an Australian at 3:51.51. Before turning professional, he graduated from Illinois State University in 2021 where he was an NCAA Division 1 First Team All-American. Anstey now trains in Flagstaff, AZ where he is sponsored by Under Armour. He has represented Australia at the 2022 World Indoor Championships, the 2023 World Road Running Championships and the 2026 World Athletics Cross Country Championships as a member of the gold medal winning Senior 4x2km Mixed Relay team.

== Personal bests ==
- 800m: 1:47.12
- 1000m: 2:16.95 AR
- 1500m: 3:33.93
- Mile: 3:51.51
- 3000m: 7:42.60
- Mile Road: 3:56.42

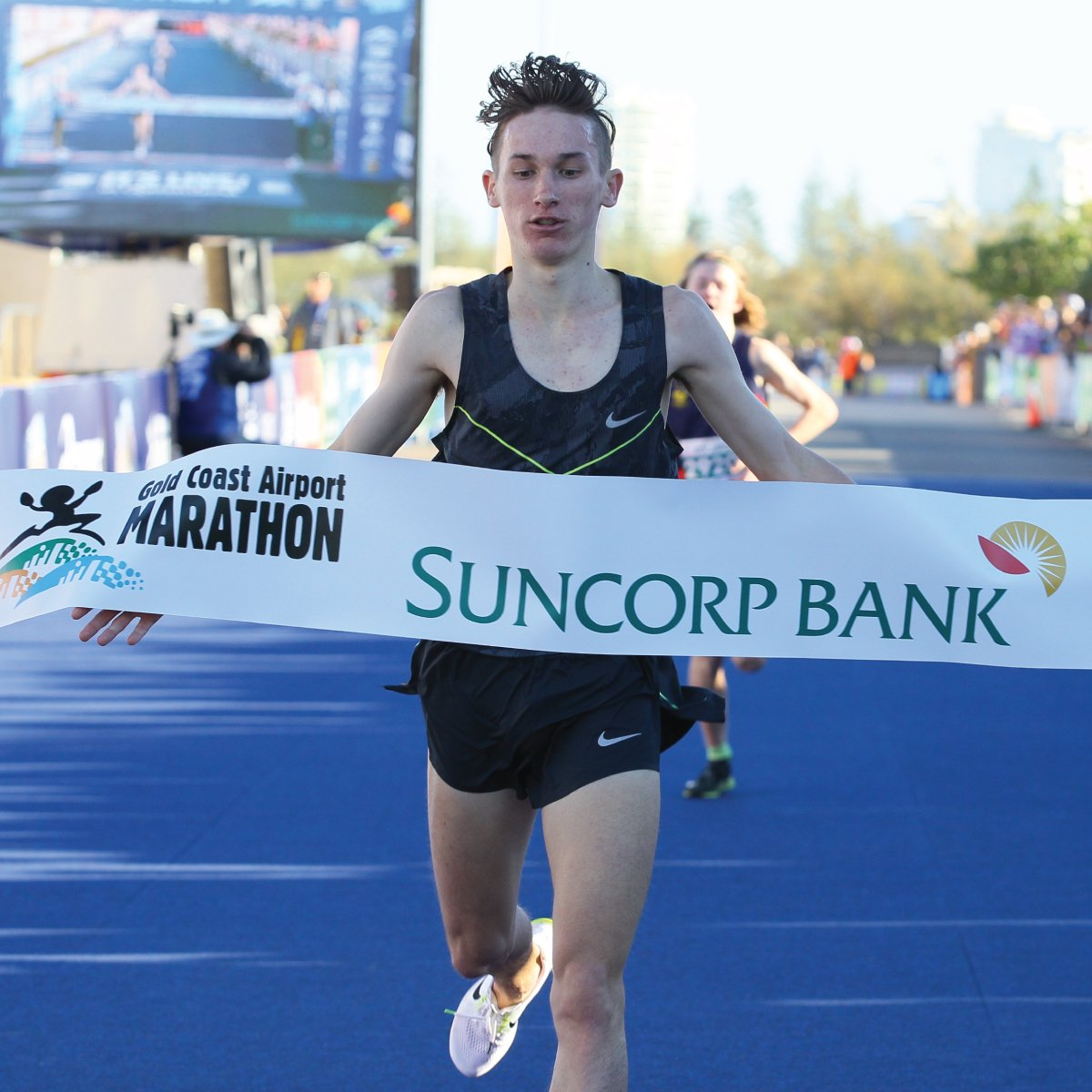
Jack Anstey
