= Casey Clinger =

American long-distance runner (born 1998)

Personal information
- Born: 9 October 1998 (age 27)
- Education: Brigham Young University

Sport
- Sport: Athletics
- Events: Long distance running, Cross country running

Achievements and titles
- Personal bests: 1500m: 3:38.16 30 (Clovis, 2021); Mile: 3:57.13 (Boston, 2023); 3000m: 7:41.05 (Seattle, 2025); 5000m: 13:13.46 (Virginia Beach, 2025); 10,000m: 27:11.00 (San Juan Capistrano, 2025); Road; 5km 13:34 (Indianapolis, 2025); 20km: 58:05 (New Haven, 2025); 25km: 1:12:17 (Grand Rapids, 2025) NR; Half marathon: 59:34 (Houston, 2026); Marathon: 2:08:43 (Tokyo, 2026)

Casey Clinger (born 9 October 1998) is an American long-distance and cross country runner. In 2025, he set the American road national record over 25 km.

== Early life ==
Born to Steve and Tiffany, his father Steve competed in high school football, basketball and the discus throw in athletics. His mother Tiffany was a ballerina and accepted a ballet scholarship to Brigham Young University. Clinger attended American Fork High School in Utah prior to attending BYU himself. He graduated from high school with a perfect 4.0 grade-point average.

== Career ==
As a high schooler, Clinger set the fastest time recorded at the Utah state cross country championships, a record which stood until broken by Jackson Spencer in 2025. He was an eight-time state champion in cross-country and track. He won back to back titles at Nike Cross Nationals in 2015 and 2016. In 2016, he was named Gatorade National Athlete of the Year for cross-country.

Clinger had his debut racing for Brigham Young University as a freshman in 2017 and ran that year at the 2017 NCAA Division I cross country championships, was BYU's top finisher, helping the team finish third in the team standings.

Clinger helped the BYU Cougars win the team event at the 2024 NCAA Division I cross country championships, placing sixth overall in the individual race. Clinger finished fifth over 10,000 metres at the 2024 US Olympic Trials in Eugene, Oregon in June 2024.

In March 2025, competing at The Ten in California, Clinger ran a personal best of 27:11.00 in the 10,000m to move to fifth on the all-time NCAA list and set a new BYU school record, previously held by his head coach, Ed Eyestone. That month, Clinger placed fourth over 5000 metres at the 2025 NCAA Indoor Championships in Virginia Beach in a personal best 13:13.46.

Clinger turned professional in April 2025, signing with Brooks Running. In his second professional race, competing on the roads in Grand Rapids, Michigan, Clinger won the USATF 25 km Championships title and set a new American record for the distance, bettering the American record, set previously by Diego Estrada, by 52 seconds with a time of 1:12:17. Clinger placed sixth in the 10,000m at the 2025 USA Outdoor Track and Field Championships in Eugene, Oregon.

Clinger made his marathon debut at the 2025 Chicago Marathon, placing 25th overall in 2:16:05. On 11 January 2026, Clinger ran 59:34 at the Houston Half Marathon. On 1 March, at the 2026 Tokyo Marathon, Clinger ran a new personal best of 2:08:43. On 13 September, he placed fourth at the Great North Run in England, finishing in a time of 61:36.

== Personal life ==
Clinger has four brothers, Chance, Chase, Carson and Colby. He is a keen guitarist. He married Morgan and they had a child together in 2024.
