= Liam Murphy (runner) =

American runner (born 2002)

Personal information
- Born: April 2, 2002 (age 24)

Sport
- Sport: Athletics
- Event: Middle-distance running

Achievements and titles
- Personal bests: *All information from athlete's World Athletics profile unless otherwise noted.: 1500 m: 3:33.02 (Raleigh 2025); Mile: 3.50.49 (Eugene 2026); 3000 m: 7:35.47i (Boston 2025); 5000 m: 13:10.42i (Boston 2024)

Liam Murphy (born 4 February 2002) is an American middle-distance runner. In 2025, he ran 3:33.02 for the 1500 metres to set a new NCAA record.

== Early life ==
From Millstone, New Jersey, he attended Allentown High School and was a soccer player in his youth before focusing on athletics in 2018. He committed to attend Villanova University in October 2019.

== Career ==
He worked at Villanova University under head coach Marcus O'Sullivan. He broke 4 minutes for the mile indoors in 2023 and anchored the Villanova team to a win in the 4xmile at the Penn Relays that year, going from ninth place to first during a final sprint over the last 150 meters.

In April 2024, he lowered his 1500 metres personal best to 3:36.48 at the Bryan Clay Invitational in California. Running alongside Sean Dolan, Luke Rakowitz and Dan Watcke, he won the Medley Relay for Villanova at the 2024 Penn Relays later that month. He was a finalist at the 2024 NCAA Outdoor Championships, placing eleventh, and also reached the final of the 1500 metres at the US Olympic Trials in June 2024 running a personal best 3:36.37, and placed eleventh again, with both events in Eugene, Oregon.

He finished ninth at the 2024 NCAA Division I cross country championships in November 2024. He placed fourth at the NCAA Indoor Championships over 3000 metres in March 2025. He set a new NCAA record of 3:33.02 for the 1500 metres later that month at the Raleigh Relays, breaking the time of 3:33.74 from 2022 set outdoors by Eliud Kipsang and also the absolute 1500 metres record of 3:33.41, set by Gary Martin and Ethan Strand during the indoor season.

He competed at the 2025 NCAA Outdoor Championships but did not qualify for the final, run out of the qualifying places in a slow tactical race in a time of 3:52.44. On 12 July 2025, he placed fifth in 3:37.41 at the Ed Murphey Track Classic, a World Athletics Continental Tour Silver event, in Memphis, Tennessee.

Murphy had a seventh place finish at the 2025 USA Cross Country Championships, and was first alternate for the 2026 World Cross Country Championships, however despite a late injury to Rocky Hansen, there was insufficient time for Murphy to fly to the venue. In July, Murphy ran a personal best 3:50.49 for the mile run at the 2026 Prefontaine Classic.
