= Gela Hambese =

Ethiopian athlete (born 2002)

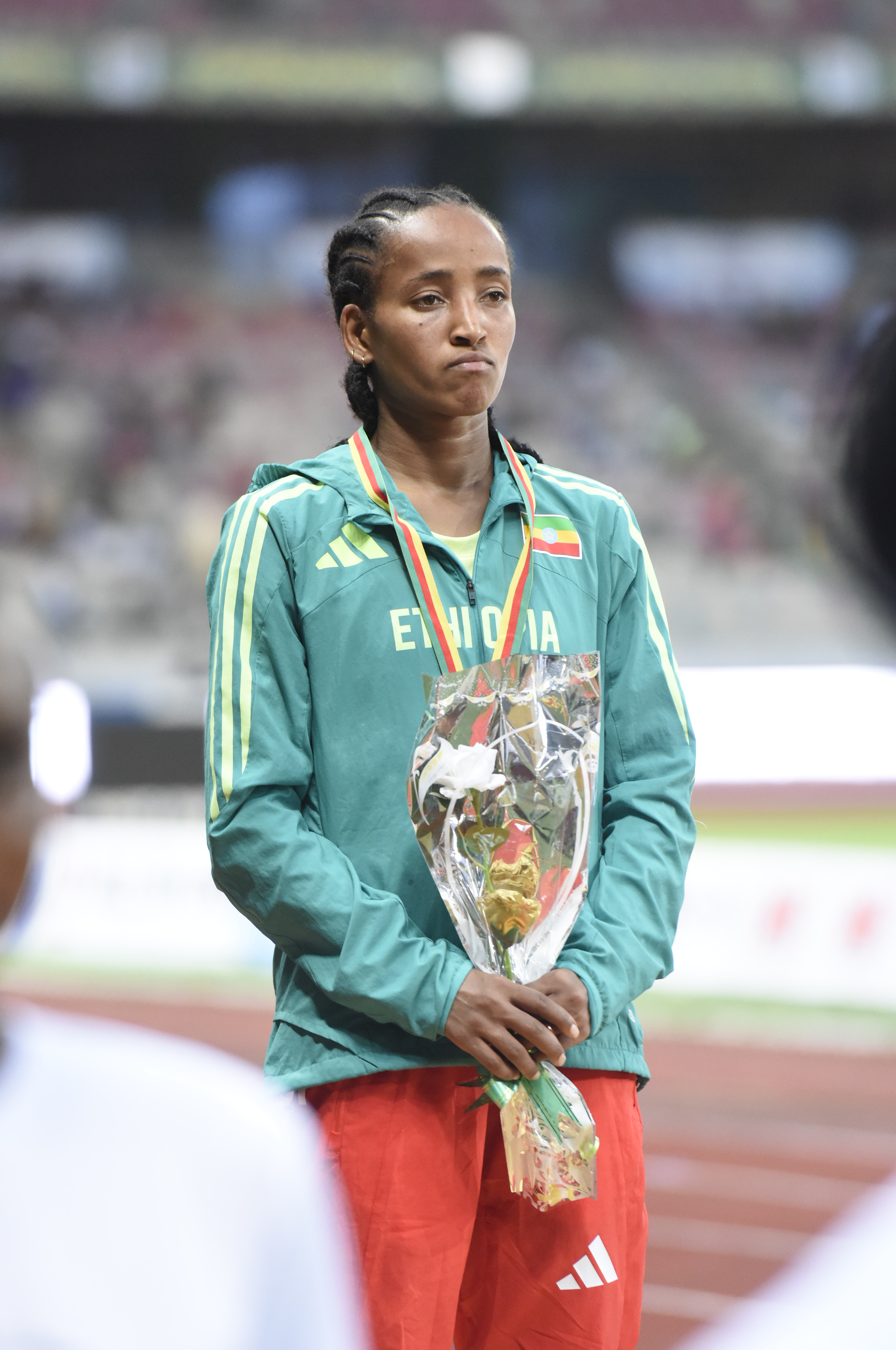
- Hambese in 2024

Personal information
- Born: Gela Hambese Degefa; 25 September 2002 (age 23)

Sport
- Sport: Athletics
- Event: Long-distance running

Achievements and titles
- Personal best(s): 1500m: 4:08.40 (2023); Mile: 4:24.44 (2024); 3000m: 8:57.73 (2024); 5000m: 14:47.74 (2024); 10,000m: 30:49.14 (2024); Road; 5km: 14:51 (2025); 10km: 31:15 (2025)
Medal record
Women's athletics
Representing Ethiopia
African Championships
| Bronze medal – third place | 2024 Douala | 10,000 m |
World Cross Country Championships
| Bronze medal – third place | 2026 Tallahassee | Mixed relay |

Gela Hambese Degefa (born 25 September 2002) is an Ethiopian long-distance runner. She was a bronze medalist over 10,000 metres at the 2024 African Championships.

== Biography ==
Hambese competed in the 2024 Diamond League, placing fifth over 5000 metres in May 2024 at the 2024 Doha Diamond League event, before placing eighth later that month over that distance at the 2024 Meeting International Mohammed VI d'Athlétisme in Rabat. Hambese won the bronze medal in the women's 10,000 metres at the 2024 African Championships in Athletics in Douala, Cameroon, in June 2024, running 37:09.02.

In April 2025, Hambese won the Boston 5K in Massachusetts, finishing in a time of 14:53 ahead of Grace Loibach and Taylor Roe. In July 2025, she placed third behind Hellen Obiri and Senayet Getachew at the AJC Peachtree 10K Road Race in Atlanta, Georgia.

She was selected for the mixed relay at the 2026 World Athletics Cross Country Championships in Tallahassee, Florida, winning the bronze medal, alongside Milkesa Fikadu, Wegene Adisu and Hirut Meshesha. In April, Hambese retained her title at the Boston 5K.
