= 2025 USA Cross Country Championships =

Running competition in the United States

- Venue: Glendoveer Golf Course, Portland, Oregon
- Dates: 6 December 2025

The 2025 USA Cross Country Championships will be the 134th edition of the USA Cross Country Championships. The USA Cross Country Championships will take place at Glendoveer Golf Course in Portland, Oregon, on 06 December 2025.

== Results ==
Race results - USATF XC National Championships December 6, 2025

=== Men 10km ===
Position	Athlete	Time
1st place, gold medalist(s)	Parker Wolfe	29:16.4
2nd place, silver medalist(s)	Rocky Hansen	29:24.8
3rd place, bronze medalist(s)	Wesley Kiptoo	29:27.7
4	Ahmed Muhumed	29:33.7
5	Nico Young	29:41.6
6	Graham Blanks	29:45.0
7	Liam Murphy	29:59.4
8	Paul Chelimo	30:14.8
9	Morgan Beadlescomb	30:15.9
10	Robert Liking	30:16.1

=== Women 10km ===
Position	Athlete	Time
1st place, gold medalist(s)	Weini Kelati	33:45.5
2nd place, silver medalist(s)	Katie Izzo	34:00.9
3rd place, bronze medalist(s)	Ednah Kurgat	34:09.9
4	Karissa Schweizer	34:16.2
5	Emily Venters	34:20.7
6	Grace Hartman	34:25.7
7	Elise Stearns	34:33.1
8	Allie Ostrander	34:34.4
9	Emma Grace Hurley	34:40.9
10	Parker Valby	34:48.9

=== Men 2km ===
Position	Athlete	Time
1st place, gold medalist(s)	Ethan Strand	5:25.8
2nd place, silver medalist(s)	Wes Porter	5:26.5
3rd place, bronze medalist(s)	Garrett MacQuiddy	5:33.6
4	Sam Gilman	5:34.5
5	Vincent Ciattei	5:35.5
6	Kasey Knevelbaard	5:37.4
7	Liam Meirow	5:37.7
8	Craig Engels	5:37.9
9	Damien Dilcher	5:41.6
10	Jacob Hunter	5:47.0

=== Women 2km ===
Position	Athlete	Time
1st place, gold medalist(s)	Gracie Morris	6:19.4
2nd place, silver medalist(s)	Sage Hurta-Klecker	6:22.9
3rd place, bronze medalist(s)	Annika Reiss	6:23.1
4	Gracie Hyde	6:28.4
5	Kayley Delay	6:29.0
6	Cailee Peterson	6:31.9
7	Emily Mackay	6:32.3
8	Alex Carlson	6:36.3
9	Teagan Schein-Becker	6:36.3
10	Addison Wiley	6:39.5

=== U-20 Men 8km ===
Position	Athlete	Time
1st place, gold medalist(s)	Aidan Torres	25:10.8
2nd place, silver medalist(s)	Tyler Daillak	25:13.8
3rd place, bronze medalist(s)	Daniel Skandera	25:19.0
4	Salvador Wirth	25:20.6
5	Dylan Maloney	25:20.8
6	Juan Gonzalez	25:22.5
7	Wil Ihmels	25:43.1
8	Jack Bidwell	25:45.2
9	Henry Acorn	25:55.8
10	Isaac Benjamin	25:56.1

=== U-20 Women 6km ===
Position	Athlete	Time
1st place, gold medalist(s)	Victoria Garces	21:07.0
2nd place, silver medalist(s)	Daniela Scheffler	21:20.7
3rd place, bronze medalist(s)	Caroline Barton	21:54.6
4	Abigail Sewell	22:03.1
5	Norah Hushagen	22:21.7
6	Avery Marasco-Johnson	22:28.3
7	Maeve Smith	22:52.8
8	Lillian Dicola	23:00.1
9	Arabella Nelson	23:08.3
10	Macy Hanson	23:09.8

=== Master's Men 8km ===
Position	Athlete	Time
1st place, gold medalist(s)	Max King	26:23.9
2nd place, silver medalist(s)	Neil McDonagh	27:37.5
3rd place, bronze medalist(s)	Jeremy Parks	27:53.0
4	Adam Condit	28:02.7
5	Erik Teig	28:07.9
6	Ian Batch	28:21.4
7	Woodham Favinger	28:32.5
8	Thomas Morgan	28:43.6
9	Jason Donald	28:48.3
10	Roosevelt Cook	28:54.8

=== Master's Women 6km ===
Position	Athlete	Time
1st place, gold medalist(s)	Renee Metivier Baillie	22:58.9
2nd place, silver medalist(s)	Carrie Dimoff	23:07.5
3rd place, bronze medalist(s)	Julia Webb	23:18.6
4	Alison Crocker	23:30.6
5	Ann Kirkpatrick	24:00.3
6	Gretchen Hurlbutt	24:37.7
7	Eva Vail	25:18.9
8	Vivien Hyman	25:25.3
9	Kristin Shaw	25:36.6
10	Laura Breymann	25:37.4
