= Bentalin Yeko =

Ugandan long-distance runner

Personal information
- Born: 6 November 2007 (age 18)

Sport
- Sport: Athletics
- Events: Long-distance running, Cross country running
Medal record
Women's athletics
Representing Uganda
African U20 Championships
Gold medal – first place	2025 Abeokuta	3000m
World Cross Country Championships
Gold medal – first place	2026 Tallahassee	U20 team

Bentalin Yeko (born 6 November 2007) is a Ugandan long-distance and cross country runner.

== Biography ==
Yeko placed twelfth in the individual competition competing for Uganda in the U20 race at the 2023 World Athletics Cross Country Championships in Bathurst, Australia, helping the Ugandan team to a fourth place finish overall.

Yeko was runner-up over 3000 metres at the U20 Ugandan Championships in June 2024. Yeko placed seventh over 3000 metres representing Uganda at the 2024 World Athletics U20 Championships in Lima, Peru.

Yeko was a gold medalist over 3000 metres at the 2025 African U20 Championships in Abeokuta, Nigeria, taking nearly eight seconds off the 31-year-old championship record with 8:45.49.

Yeko won the Ugandan national junior cross country title in Mbale in November 2025. Subsequently, in January 2026, she was confirmed in the Uganda U20 team for the 2026 World Athletics Cross Country Championships in Tallahassee, where she placed seventh overall helping Uganda to win the U20 gold medal in the team event. Later that month, she placed fourth at the Lotto Cross Cup de Hannut in Belgium. She was selected to represent her country at the 2026 World Athletics U20 Championships.
