= Ahmed Muhumed =

American long-distance runner (born 1998)

Personal information
- Nationality: American
- Born: 1 January 1998 (age 28) Ethiopia

Sport
- Sport: Athletics
- Events: Long distance running, Cross country running

Achievements and titles
- Personal bests: 1500m: 3:37.36 (2024); 3000m: 7:39.39 (2024); 5000m: 13:07.49 (2025); 10,000m: 27:03.19 (2025); Road; 5k 13:27 (2023); 10k 28:07 (2025); Half marathon: 1:00:15 (2026); Marathon: 2:07:09 (2026)
Medal record
Men's athletics
Representing United States
World Road Running Championships
Bronze medal – third place	2026 Copenhagen	Half marathon team

Ahmed Muhumed (born 1 January 1998) is an American long-distance and cross country runner. He represented the United States at the 2024 World Cross Country Championships.

== Biography ==
Muhamed was born in Jijiga in the Somali region of Ethiopia, and moved to the United States in 2011, the son of a Somalian mother who escaped Civil War in the early 1990s. He became an American citizen in 2018. He attended West Salem High School in Salem, Oregon. As a high school sophomore, Muhumed was named the Statesman Journal All-Mid-Valley boys cross country athlete of the year in December 2014. He competed in the NCAA Cross Country Championships in 2017, 2018 and 2019 for Boise State University. After transferring to complete a master's degree in international relations and affairs, Muhamed placed twentieth in the individual race at 2021 NCAA Cross Country Championships, competing for Florida State University, running a personal best time for the distance.

Muhamed was 3rd at the 2024 USA Cross Country Championships and subsequently competed for the United States at the 2024 World Cross Country Championships in Belgrade. In July 2024, he won his first American national title with victory at the USATF 8 km Championships in Kingsport, Tennessee. Muhumed placed eighth in the 5000 metres at the 2024 USA Olympic Trials. Muhumed won his second national title later that year at the 2024 USATF 5K Road Championships in New York City. In November 2024, he won on his debut at the half marathon distance, in Philadelphia.

He placed a fourth at the USA Half Marathon Championships in 2025 and fourth over 10,000 metres at the 2025 USA Outdoor Track and Field Championships. In December, Muhumed ran 29:33.7 for a fourth-place finish at the 2025 USA Cross Country Championships to automatically gain selection for his second consecutive Worlds appearance at the 2026 World Athletics Cross Country Championships, in Tallahassee, where he placed 46th overall.

On 1 March 2026, he ran 1:01:51 to place third at the USA Half Marathon Championships in Atlanta, Georgia, behind Wesley Kiptoo and Hillary Bor. He was subsequently included in the United States team for the World Road Running Championships in Copenhagen, Denmark, winning the bronze medal in the team competition.
