= Alem Tsadik =

Ethiopian track and field athlete

Personal information
- Full name: Alem Nigus Tsadik
- Nationality: Ethiopian
- Born: 25 February 1998 (age 28)

Sport
- Sport: Athletics
- Event: Long-distance running
Medal record
Women's athletics
Representing Ethiopia
World Cross Country Championships
Gold medal – first place	2026 Tallahassee	Senior team

Alem Nigus Tsadik (born 25 February 1998) is an Ethiopian long-distance and cross country runner. She was a gold medalist representing Ethiopia in the team event at the 2026 World Athletics Cross Country Championships.

== Biography ==
In June 2023, Tsadik won the 10 km Corrida Internationale de Langueux in France, setting a new women's course record of 30:28.

Tsadik placed fourth over 10,000 metres at the 2024 African Championships in Athletics in Douala, Cameroon, in June 2024, running 37:09.02.

In October 2025, she finished runner-up at the Cardiff Half Marathon, in Wales, running 1:07:33.

In January 2026, she was selected for the senior Ethiopian team to race at the 2026 World Athletics Cross Country Championships in Tallahassee, where she had a seventh-place finish to help Ethiopia to win the team gold medal alongside Senayet Getachew, Asayech Ayichew and Aleshign Baweke.
