= Wegene Adisu =

Ethiopian athlete (born 2004)

Personal information
- Nationality: Ethiopian
- Born: 27 May 2004 (age 22)

Sport
- Sport: Athletics
- Event(s): 1500m, 3000m

Achievements and titles
- Personal bests: 1500m; 3:34.21 (Heraglo, 2021); 3000m: 7:47.64 (Madrid, 2026)
Medal record
Men's athletics
Representing Ethiopia
World Cross Country Championships
Bronze medal – third place	2026 Tallahassee	Mixed relay
World U20 Championships
Silver medal – second place	2021 Nairobi	1500m

Wegene Adisu (born 27 May 2004) is an Ethiopian middle-distance runner.

== Biography ==
He ran the 1500 metres in 3:34.21 to place sixth at the Ethiopian Olympic Trials in Hengelo in June 2021. He won the silver medal at the 2021 IAAF World Junior Championships in Nairobi, Kenya in the 1500 metres.

He finished fourth over 1500 metres at the delayed 2023 African Games in Accra, Ghana, in March 2024 in 3:39.54. In November 2024, he placed fourth at the Cross Internacional de Soria in Spain, part of the 2024–25 World Athletics Cross Country Tour.

In July 2025, he was named in the Ethiopian team for the 1500 metres at the 2025 World Athletics Championships in Tokyo, Japan.

He was selected for the mixed relay at the 2026 World Athletics Cross Country Championships in Tallahassee, Florida, winning the bronze medal, alongside Milkesa Fikadu, Gela Hambese and Hirut Meshesha.
