= Seth O'Donnell =

Australian long-distance runner

Personal information
- Born: 14 September 2001 (age 25)

Sport
- Sport: Athletics
- Events: Long-distance running, Cross Country running

Achievements and titles
- Personal bests: 1500m: 3:37.68 (Kortrijk, 2026); 3000m: 7:29.49 (Shanghai, 2026); 5000m: 13:12.42 (Sydney, 2026); 10,000m: 27:59.65 (Melbourne, 2025); Road; 10km 28:42 (Melbourne, 2024); Half Marathon: 1:01:20 (Melbourne, 2026)

Seth O'Donnell (born 14 September 2001) is an Australian long-distance runner. He became Australian champion over 5000 metres and 10,000 metres in 2025, and competed for Australia at the 2025 World Athletics Championships.

== Biography ==
From Melbourne, he had a background in Australian Rules Football and came to athletics relatively late. He was Victoria state champion in the under-20 5000 metres in March 2020, one of his first races.

O'Donnell won his first Australian national cross country title in Oakbank, South Australia in muddy conditions, in 2022. O’Donnell won his second national cross country title in wet conditions in Launceston, Tasmania, in 2024.

O'Donnell had a successful 2025, despite suffering from stress fractures throughout the year. In April 2025, O'Donnell won over 5000 metres at the Australian Athletics Championships in Perth, running 13:49.30 to beat Cameron Myers and Ky Robinson.

in August, he ran a personal best 7:34.43 for the 3000 metres in Sweden, finishing runner-up to Andreas Almgren in Sollentuna. In September 2025, he competed over 5000 metres at the 2025 World Championships in Tokyo, Japan, without advancing to the final. On 13 November, O'Donnell broke the Victorian Milers Club record for 3000 metres.

In December 2025, O'Donnell won the Australian 10,000 metres title in Melbourne in a time of 27:59.65. That month, he was runner-up to Myers at the Australian World Championships Cross Country trials at Stromlo Forest Park, and was subsequently selected for the Australia team for the 2026 World Athletics Cross Country Championships in Tallahassee, placing 45th overall. Competing at the 2026 Maurie Plant Meet in Melbourne in March, he placed second over 3000 metres in 7:41.11, behind compatriot Jackson Sharp. On 11 April, he finished runner-up to Cam Myers defending his 5000 metres title at the 2026 Australian Championships. Making his Diamond League debut the following month at the 2026 Shanghai Diamond League, he ran the 3000 metres in a time of 7:29.49 to become the third Australian man in history to break the 7:30 barrier after Myers and Stewart McSweyn. He competed in the 5000 metres at the 2026 Commonwealth Games in Glasgow, Scotland.

== Personal life ==
A keen drummer, O'Donnell has been described as a cult hero in Australian athletics due to his distinctive mullet hairstyle and fearless racing style.
