= Nibret Kinde =

Ethiopian athlete

Personal information
- Nationality: Ethiopian
- Born: 1 January 2006 (age 20)

Sport
- Sport: Athletics
- Events: Long-distance running, Cross country running

Achievements and titles
- Personal bests: 5000m: 13:18.97 (Hawassa, 2024); 10,000m: 28:39.49 (2026); Road; 5km: 13:16 (2024); 10km: 28:02 (2025)
Medal record
Men's athletics
Representing Ethiopia
World Cross Country Championships
Gold medal – first place	2026 Tallahassee	Senior team

Nibret Kinde (born 1 January 2006) is an Ethiopian long-distance and cross country runner. He won the Ethiopian Athletics Championships over 10,000 metres in 2026.

== Biography ==
With a personal best for the 5000 metres of 13:18.97, Kinde was selected to represent Ethiopia at the 2024 World Athletics U20 Championships in Lima, Peru, placing sixth overall in the event with a time of 13:44.67. Competing on the road, he had a fifth-place finish at the San Silvestre Vallecana, a World Athletics Gold Label road race, in Madrid, Spain, on 31 December 2024. In February 2025, he had a fourth-place finish in the junior race at Jan Meda International Cross Country.

In November 2025, he was announced in the Ethiopian team for the 2026 World Athletics Cross Country Championships. On 10 January 2026 at the Championship in Tallahassee, he placed 18th overall with Ethiopia winning the men's team gold medal.

Kinde won the Ethiopian Athletics Championships over 10,000 metres in March 2026, running a time of 28:39.49.
