= Athletics at the 2026 Commonwealth Games – Men's 5000 metres =

Men's 5000 metres at the 2026 Commonwealth Games
- Venue: Scotstoun Stadium, Glasgow
- Dates: 1 August 2026
- Winning time: 13:23:61

Medalists
gold medal	Mathew Kipsang	Kenya
silver medal	Ky Robinson	Australia
bronze medal	Gulveer Singh	India

The men's 5000 metres at the 2026 Commonwealth Games, as part of the athletics programme, took place at the Scotstoun Stadium on 1 August 2026. The event was a straight final.

== Records ==
Prior to this competition, the existing world and Games records were as follows:

Men's 5000 m
World record	12:35.36	Joshua Cheptegei (UGA)	14 Aug 2020	Monaco
Commonwealth record	12:35.36	Joshua Cheptegei (UGA)	14 Aug 2020	Monaco
Games record	12:56.41	Augustine Choge (KEN)	20 Mar 2006	Melbourne, Australia

== Schedule ==
The schedule was as follows:

Date	Time	Round
1 August 2026	19:45	Final

All times are United Kingdom time (UTC+1)

== Results ==
=== Final ===
The straight final of the 5000 metres was held in the evening of 1 August 2026.

Place	Athlete	Nation	Time	Notes
1st place, gold medalist(s)	Mathew Kipsang	Kenya	13:23.61	
2nd place, silver medalist(s)	Ky Robinson	Australia	13:24.70	
3rd place, bronze medalist(s)	Gulveer Singh	India	13:24.95	
4	Cornelius Kemboi	Kenya	13:24.99	
5	Keneth Kiprop	Uganda	13:25.70	
6	Nick Griggs	Northern Ireland	13:25.84	
7	Mohammed Ahmed	Canada	13:26.09	
8	Kieran Lumb	Canada	13:26.18	
9	Jackson Sharp	Australia	13:29.38	
10	Andrew Alamisi	Kenya	13:30.35	
11	David Mullarkey	Isle of Man	13:32.36	
12	Dan Kibet	Uganda	13:33.93	
13	Kamohelo Mofolo	Lesotho	13:34.02	PB
14	Justyn Knight	Canada	13:36.04	SB
15	Callum Morgan	Northern Ireland	13:39.02	
16	Seth O'Donnell	Australia	13:40.42	
17	Benjamin Ratsim	Tanzania	13:49.03	PB
18	Andrew Butchart	Scotland	13:55.31	
19	Daniel Sinda	Tanzania	13:59.41	SB
20	Josephat Gisemo	Tanzania	14:05.52	SB
21	Yeshnil Karan	Fiji	14:35.76	SB
22	Muhammad Akhtar	Pakistan	14:50.95	SB
23	Nathan Chisale	Malawi	15:06.12	PB
24	Leony Pusua	Solomon Islands	16:16.18	PB
25	Geejay Junior	Solomon Islands	16:32.72	
—	Oscar Chelimo	Uganda	DNS	
