= Tyler Daillak =

American long-distance runner (born 2007)

Personal information
- Born: 8 June 2007 (age 19)

Sport
- Sport: Athletics
- Events: Long-distance running, Cross country running
Medal record
Men's athletics
Representing United States
World Cross Country Championships
Bronze medal – third place	2026 Tallahassee	Junior team

Tyler Daillak (born 8 June 2007) is an American cross country runner. He was a bronze medalist in the U20 team event at the 2026 World Athletics Cross Country Championships.

== Biography ==
From California, Daillak showed aptitude for running from an early age. As a 10 year-old, he competed at the 2017 City to Sea 5K run, and finished with a time 19:42, placing first in the under-18 category, and sixth overall from a field of 400.

Daillak attended Paso Robles High School. In October 2024, he ran a personal best to win the 5 km title at the Clovis International boys race. As a high school runner, Dalliak was a Mountain League cross country champion and a CIF Central Section champion. In December 2024, he won the Foot Locker West Regional cross country title, in Walnut, California. He began studying at California Polytechnic State University, San Luis Obispo from 2025.

In December 2025, Daillak had a second place finish behind Aiden Torres in the men’s U20 race at the 2025 USA Cross Country Championships.

Daillak won a bronze medal in the U20 team event at the 2026 World Athletics Cross Country Championships in Tallahassee, Florida, on 10 January 2026, and was the highest American placer in 16th overall, despite finishing the course with one shoe.
