= Maurine Chebor =

Kenyan long-distance runner

Personal information
- Full name: Maurine Jepkoech Chebor
- Born: 28 May 2004 (age 22)

Sport
- Sport: Athletics
- Events: Long-distance running, Cross country running
Medal record
Women's athletics
Representing Kenya
World Cross Country Championships
Silver medal – second place	2026 Tallahassee	Senior team

Maurine Jepkoech Chebor (born 28 May 2004) is a Kenyan long-distance and cross country runner. She won the Kenyan Cross Country Championships in 2025 and was a silver medalist in the team event at the 2026 World Athletics Cross Country Championships.

== Biography ==
Chebor is coached by Emmanuel Kipkoech. In October 2024, Chebor won her first senior race at the Betika BigwaFest Race. She won the Sparkassen Cross Pforzheim, a silver label race on the 2024–25 World Athletics Cross Country Tour the following month.

In February 2025, Chebor finished second at the Kenyan Cross Country Championships. Chebor was runner-up to Sarah Chelangat over 5000 metres at the 2025 Kip Keino Classic. Chebor was fifteenth over 5000 metres at the 2025 Prefontaine Classic in Eugene, Oregon, part of the 2025 Diamond League. Chebor won at the BingwaFest in Nakuru in the women's 10,000m and 5,000m in August 2025.

Chebor won the Kenyan Cross Country Championships over 10 km in Eldoret on 25 October 2025. She was subsequently selected to represent Kenya at the 2026 World Athletics Cross Country Championships in the United States, where she placed eighth overall and won the silver medal in the team event with Kenya.

In May, she ran a personal best 14:39.31 for the 5000 m at the 2026 Shanghai Diamond League. In November, she placed fifth at the Cross Internacional de Itálica in Seville.
