= Kenya national athletics team =

National athletics team representing Kenya

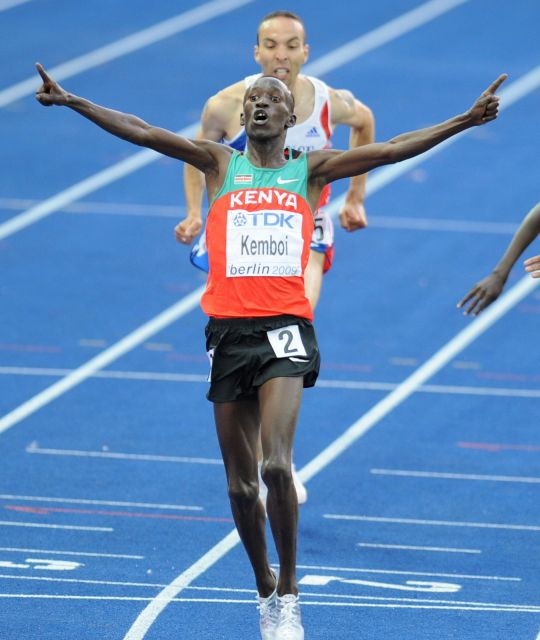
Ezekiel Kemboi, Olympic champion on 3000 m st in London 2012, the last of the 10 Kenyan Olympic champions of the specialty.

The Kenya national athletics team represents Kenya at the international athletics competitions such as Olympic Games or World Athletics Championships.

== Medal count ==
Kenya has participated in 14 of the 28 editions of the Summer Olympic Games from 1896 to 2016.

Competition	Medal table				
Competition	1st place, gold medalist(s)	2nd place, silver medalist(s)	3rd place, bronze medalist(s)	Tot.	Rank
Summer Olympics	30	37	27	94	6
World Championships	55	48	37	140	2
Total	85	85	64	234	

== See also ==
- Athletics Kenya
- Kenya at the Olympics
- List of Kenyan records in athletics
- Athletics Summer Olympics medal table
- World Championships medal table
