= Mercy Chepngeno Mageso =

Kenyan long-distance runner (born 2008)

Mercy Chepngeno
Personal information
- Full name: Mercy Chepngeno Mageso
- Born: 10 October 2008 (age 17)

Sport
- Sport: Athletics
- Event(s): Long-distance running, Cross country running
Medal record
Women's athletics
Representing Kenya
World Cross Country Championships
Silver medal – second place	2026 Tallahassee	U20 team

Mercy Chepngeno Mageso (born 10 October 2008) is Kenyan long-distance and cross country runner.

== Biography ==
In October, she placed fourth in the U20 race at the Kenyan Cross Country Championships. In December 2025, she was selected in the Kenyan team for the 2026 World Athletics Cross Country Championships in Tallahassee, where she placed eighth overall in the U20 race, helping Kenya to the silver medal in the team competition.

In May 2026, she had a top-ten finish in the 10,000 metres at the 2026 African Championships in Athletics in Accra, Ghana. Later that month, Mageso competed at the Kenyan U20 Trials in Nairobi, finishing second in the 3000 metres in 8:59.00 and third in the 5000 metres in 15:54.8.
