= Hagos Eyob =

Ethiopian long-distance runner (born 2006)

Personal information
- Full name: Hagos Eyob Gared
- Born: 16 December 2006 (age 19)

Sport
- Sport: Athletics
- Events: Long distance running, Cross country running

Achievements and titles
- Personal bests: 3000m: 7:54.62 (2025); 5000m: 13:29.20 (2024); 10,000m: 28:30.57 (2026); Road; 10k: 27:55 (2026); Half marathon: 59:42 (2026)
Medal record
Men's athletics
Representing Ethiopia
African Championships
| Silver medal – second place | 2026 Accra | 10,000 m |

Hagos Eyob Gared (born 16 December 2006) is an Ethiopian long-distance and cross country runner. He was the silver medalist over 10,000 metres at the 2026 African Championships.

== Biography ==
In February 2024, Eyob was the first Ethiopian finisher, and fifth overall, in the men's U20 race at the 2024 African Cross Country Championships in Hammamet, Tunisia. Eyob placed fourth at the Jan Meda International Cross Country held over 10 km on November 9, 2025, in Addis Ababa and was subsequently announced in the Ethiopian team for the 2026 World Athletics Cross Country Championships in Tallahassee. However, the Ethiopian team was beset by VISA issues resulting in many of the squad being unable to travel to take part.

The following month, he ran 59:42 to place fifth at the Barcelona half marathon. In April, he placed second in 27:55 behind compatriot Biniam Mehary competing on the road at the 10 km en Ruta Villa de Laredo in Spain. In May, he represented Ethiopia over 10,000 metres at the 2026 African Championships in Athletics in Accra, Ghana, winning the silver medal in 28:30.57 behind Kenyan Kevin Chesang.
