= Dolphine Chelimo =

Ugandan track and field athlete

Personal information
- Born: 10 July 2005 (age 20)

Sport
- Sport: Athletics
- Event(s): 3000m steeplechase, Long-distance running, Cross country running

Achievements and titles
- Personal best(s): 5000m: 13:23.24 (2025); 10,000m: 28:38.35 (2025); 3000m s'chase: 8:43.25 (2025); Road; 5km: 13:46 (2025); 10km 28:13 (2025)
Medal record
Men's athletics
Representing Uganda
World Cross Country Championships
Bronze medal – third place	2026 Tallahassee	Senior team
Bronze medal – third place	2024 Belgrade	Junior team

Dolphine Chelimo (born 10 July 2005) is an Ugandan long-distance and cross country runner, and steeplechaser.

== Career ==
Chelimo attended Chemwania High School. He was a bronze medalist in the 2000 metres steeplechase at the World School Sport Games in Caen, France, in 2022. He finished second in the individual race and won the team competition with Uganda at the 2022 ISF World Schools Cross Country Championship in Slovakia.

Chelimo was a bronze medalist in the team U20 men's race at the 2024 World Athletics Cross Country Championships in Belgrade, placing twelfth overall.

Chelimo was runner-up to Leonard Chemutai in the 3000 metres steeplechase at the 2025 Ugandan Athletics Championships, in 8:43.25.

Chelimo placed seventh overall in the men's race at the 2026 World Athletics Cross Country Championships in Tallahassee, winning the bronze medal with Uganda in the team event.
