= Rebecca Mwangi =

Kenyan athlete (born 2001)

Personal information
- Full name: Rebecca Njeri Mwangi
- Nationality: Kenyan
- Born: 15 June 2001 (age 25)

Sport
- Sport: Athletics
- Event: Long-distance running

Achievements and titles
- Personal bests: 1500m: 4:16.56 (2024); 3000m: 8:52.92 (2022); 5000m: 14:55.32 (2020); 10000m: 31:35.16 (2025); Road; 5km: 15:39 (2022); 10km: 31:13 (2025); Half marathon: 1:08:46 (2025)
Medal record
Women's athletics
Representing Kenya
African Championships
Silver medal – second place	2024 Douala	10,000 m
World Cross Country Championships
Silver medal – second place	2026 Tallahassee	Senior team

Rebecca Njeri Mwangi (born 15 June 2001) is a Kenyan long-distance and cross country runner. She was the silver medalist over 10,000 metres at the 2024 African Championships and Kenyan national champion over 5000 metres in 2025.

== Biography ==
Mwangi was based in Japan for a number of years, and completed her high school diploma there before joining the Daiso Women Ekiden team. In 2020, she became the first Kenyan woman ever to run under 15 minutes for the 5000 metres, running 14:55.32 during the All Japan Corporate Teams Championships.

Mwangi placed sixth over 5000 metres at the Kenyan National trials in 2022. She won the 5,000m final at the Athletics Kenya First Weekend Meeting in Nairobi on February 4, 2022, in 15:25.26.

Mwangi was the silver medalist over 10,000 meters at the 2024 African Championships in Athletics in Douala, Cameroon. She placed fourth over 5000 metres at the same championships.

In June 2025, she won the Kenyan Athletics Championships over 5000 metres in 15:39.78 ahead of Cynthia Chepkirui. At the championships she also ran 32:22.85 to finish third in the 10,000m. Later that year, she finished runner-up at the Kenya Prisons Cross Country Championships. She made her half marathon debut at the Tokyo Legacy Half Marathon in October 2025, winning in a time of 1:08:46. In December 2025, she was confirmed in the Kenyan team for the 2026 World Athletics Cross Country Championships in Tallahassee, where she placed 16th overall as Kenya won the team silver medal. She competed in the 5000 metres at the 2026 Commonwealth Games in Glasgow, Scotland.
