= 2026 World Athletics Cross Country Championships =

46th World Athletics Cross Country Championships
- Organisers: World Athletics
- Edition: 46th
- Date: 10 January
- Host city: Tallahassee, United States
- Events: 5
- Distances: ~10 km – Senior men and women ~8 km – Junior men ~6 km – Junior women ~4×2 km – Mixed relay
- Participation: 485 athletes from 52 nations

The 2026 World Athletics Cross Country Championships was an athletics meeting organized by World Athletics, held on January 10, 2026 at the Apalachee Regional Park in Tallahassee, United States.

Jakob Kiplimo and Agnes Ngetich won the senior races, while Ethiopia won both team titles. Australia won the mixed relay.

Tallahassee was revealed as the location of the event, in July 2022. The date was announced by World Athletics President, Sebastian Coe, in Nanjing on 25 March 2025. The logo, including oranges, palm trees and a bright sun, was revealed in July 2025.

== Schedule ==
The junior races preceded the senior races, and the senior men's event concluded the program.

The 46th edition of the World Athletics Cross Country Championships was held on 10 January 2026. The schedule consisted of five events– 10 km men and women, 8 km under-20 men, 6 km under-20 women, and 4 x 2 km mixed relay. In each of the races, each nation was allowed to field a maximum of up to six athletes.

The mixed relay team consisted of teams of two women and two men each running one loop of the course in a specified order, starting with a male and alternating between genders. Athletes were to carry a wristband that was to be transferred to the next athlete within the takeover zone.

Date	Time (EST)	Events
10 January	09:45	Mixed Relay
10 January	10:20	U20 race women
10 January	10:55	U20 race men
10 January	11:35	Senior race women
10 January	12:20	Senior race men

== Broadcast ==
Country	Broadcast Company/Network
Worldwide	World Athletics Inside Track
Europe/Israel	Eurovision Sports
Australia	World Athletics Inside Track
United States	NBC/Peacock
Canada	CBC
United Kingdom	Eurovision Sport/BBC
Spain	Tele Deportes
Italy	Rai Sports
South America	TYC Sports
Turkey	TRT
Norway	NRK
Japan	U-NEXT TV
Kenya, Ethiopia	SuperSport Variety 1

== Course Map ==
2026 World Athletics Cross Country Championships Course Map

== Senior Races Prize Money ==
Rank	Championship		
Rank	Individual	Team	Mixed relay (per team)
Gold	US$30,000	US$20,000	US$12,000
Silver	US$15,000	US$16,000	US$8000
Bronze	US$10,000	US$12,000	US$6000
Fourth	US$7000	US$10,000	US$4000
Fifth	US$5000	US$8000	—
Sixth	US$3000	US$4000	—

== Participation ==
A total of 485 athletes are entered for the championships, with 52 federations being represented.

- Algeria (7)
- Argentina (4)
- Australia (30)
- Bangladesh (2)
- Belgium (1)
- Bolivia (2)
- Burundi (7)
- Canada (39)
- China (23)
- Estonia (2)
- Ethiopia (21)
- Fiji (2)
- France (12)
- French Polynesia (2)
- Ghana (1)
- Great Britain (30)
- Guam (1)
- Honduras (1)
- India (7)
- Ireland (4)
- Israel (3)
- Ivory Coast (1)
- Japan (24)
- Jordan (3)
- Kenya (35)
- Kyrgyzstan (1)
- Latvia (2)
- Lebanon (9)
- Macau (1)
- Mexico (12)
- Morocco (6)
- Namibia (1)
- Netherlands (1)
- New Zealand (24)
- Northern Mariana Islands (2)
- Palestine (1)
- Papua New Guinea (2)
- Peru (10)
- Philippines (1)
- Senegal (2)
- Seychelles (1)
- Singapore (5)
- South Africa (29)
- Spain (20)
- Sudan (1)
- Sweden (4)
- Tanzania (9)
- Uganda (26)
- United States (37)
- U.S. Virgin Islands (2)
- Venezuela (3)
- Zimbabwe (8)

== Medalists ==
Event	Gold		Silver		Bronze	
Individual
Senior men	Jacob Kiplimo; Uganda	28:18	Berihu Aregawi; Ethiopia	28:36	Daniel Simiu Ebenyo; Kenya	28:45
Senior women	Agnes Ngetich; Kenya	31:28	Joy Cheptoyek; Uganda	32:10	Senayet Getachew; Ethiopia	32:13
U20 men	Frankline Kibet; Kenya	23:18	Emmanuel Kiprono; Kenya	23:20	Andrew Alamisi; Kenya	23:28
U20 women	Marta Alemayo; Ethiopia	18:52	Wosane Asefa; Ethiopia	19:18	Charity Cherop; Uganda	19:19
Team
Senior 4x2km Mixed Relay	Australia: Oliver Hoare; Linden Hall; Jack Anstey; Jessica Hull	22:23	France: Alexis Miellet; Sarah Madeleine; Antoine Senard; Agathe Guillemot	22:26	Ethiopia: Wegene Adisu; Gela Hambese; Milkesa Fikadu; Hirut Meshesha	22:34
Senior men	Ethiopia: Berihu Aregawi; Tadese Worku; Biniam Mehary; Nibret Kinde; Bereket Nega; Mezgebu Sime	30 pts	Kenya: Daniel Ebenyo; Ishmael Kipkurui; Denis Kipkoech; Kevin Chepsergon Chesang; Shadrack Kipngetich Koech; Robert Kiprop	34 pts	Uganda: Jacob Kiplimo; Dolphine Chelimo; Keneth Kiprop; Emmanuel Kibet; Deogracius Musobo; Dan Kibet	39 pts
Senior women	Ethiopia: Senayet Getachew; Asayech Ayichew; Aleshign Baweke; Alem Tsadik; Shure Demise; Lemlem Nibret	19 pts	Kenya: Agnes Ngetich; Maurine Chebor; Caren Chebet; Rebecca Mwangi; Joyline Chepkemoi; Brenda Kenei	36 pts	Uganda: Joy Cheptoyek; Rispa Cherop; Sarah Chelangat; Rebecca Chelangat; Martha Chemutai; Kereen Chemusto	37 pts
U20 men	Kenya: Frankline Kibet; Emmanuel Kiprono; Andrew Alamisi; Andrew Kiptoo; Brian Kiptarus; Edwin Elkana	10 pts	Uganda: Abraham Cherotich; Daniel Chelogoi; Solomon Andiema; Dan Kipyeko; Jeremiah Kwemoi	31 pts	United States: Tyler Daillak; Jackson Spencer; Daniel Skandera; Aidan Torres; Salvador Wirth; Dylan Maloney	75 pts
U20 women	Uganda: Charity Cherop; Bentalin Yeko; Felister Chekwemoi; Peace Chebet; Nancy Chepkwurui	29 pts	Kenya: Cynthia Chepkirui; Joan Chepkurui; Mercy Chepngeno; Miriam Kibet; Lonah Cherono; Caren Chepngeno	29 pts	Japan: Yui Onotora; Wakana Fukuyama; Mona Utsunomiya; Mei Hosomi; Michi Kawanishi; Airi Mashiba	87 pts

== Medal table ==
* Host nation (United States)

Rank	Nation	Gold	Silver	Bronze	Total
1	Kenya (KEN)	3	4	2	9
2	Ethiopia (ETH)	3	2	2	7
3	Uganda (UGA)	2	2	3	7
4	Australia (AUS)	1	0	0	1
5	France (FRA)	0	1	0	1
6	Japan (JPN)	0	0	1	1
6	United States (USA)*	0	0	1	1
Totals (7 entries)		9	9	9	27

== Results ==
=== Senior 4x2km Mixed Relay ===
Team race
Rank	Team	Points
1st place, gold medalist(s)	Australia: Olli Hoare / 5:14; Linden Hall / 5:57; Jack Anstey / 5:22; Jessica Hull / 5:50	22:23
2nd place, silver medalist(s)	France: Alexis Miellet / 5:14; Sarah Madeleine / 6:03; Antoine Senard / 5:14; Agathe Guillemot / 5:55	22:26
3rd place, bronze medalist(s)	Ethiopia: Wegene Adisu / 5:16; Gela Hambese / 6:04; Milkesa Fikadu / 5:21; Hirut Meshesha / 5:53	22:34
4	Kenya: Reynold Cheruiyot / 5:13; Winfred Mbithe / 6:08; Daniel Munguti / 5:21; Purity Chepkirui / 6:00	22:42
5	United States: Ethan Strand / 5:12; Sage Hurta-Klecker / 6:10; Wes Porter / 5:18; Gracie Morris / 6:03	22:43
6	South Africa: Luan Munnik / 5:17; Karabo More / 6:02; Christopher Swart / 5:26; Carina Viljoen / 6:19	23:04
7	United Kingdom: George Couttie / 5:18; India Weir / 6:11; Adam Fogg / 5:29; Alexandra Millard / 6:13	23:11
8	Uganda: Silas Chemutai / 5:21; Sylvia Chelangat / 6:27; Daniel Comboni / 5:32; Brenda Chekwemoi / 6:23	23:43
9	Canada: Foster Malleck / 5:19; Kate Current / 6:24; Jean-Simon Desgagnés / 5:37; Regan Yee / 6:23	23:43
10	Japan: Takumi Shiobara / 5:32; Yuzu Nishide / 6:26; Kiyoto Ono / 5:45; Momoa Yamada / 6:25	24:08
11	Tanzania: Daniel Sinda / 5:21; Elizabeth Boniphance Ilanda / 6:35; Ambrosi Amma / 5:39; Regina Deogratius Mpigachai / 6:36	24:11
12	India: Ajay Kumar Saroj / 5:45; Pooja Olla / 6:37; Yoonus Shah / 5:29; Ankita Dhyani / 6:22	24:13
13	China: Sun Ningkai / 5:47; Xu Hui / 6:46; Yu Shuiqing / 5:42; Liu Huiru / 6:23	24:38
14	New Zealand: Christian De Vaal / 5:32; Tillie Hollyer / 6:45; David Lee / 5:40; Boh Ritchie / 6:51	24:48
15	Mexico: Israel Tinajero Álvarez / 5:33; Maria Fernanda Medina / 6:58; Roberto Márquez / 5:51; Veronica Angel / 6:49	25:11

=== Senior Men ===
Individual
Rank	Athlete	Country	Time
1st place, gold medalist(s)	Jacob Kiplimo	Uganda	28:18
2nd place, silver medalist(s)	Berihu Aregawi	Ethiopia	28:36
3rd place, bronze medalist(s)	Daniel Ebenyo	Kenya	28:45
4	Tadese Worku	Ethiopia	28:49
5	Ishmael Kipkurui	Kenya	28:53
6	Biniam Mehary	Ethiopia	29:03
7	Dolphine Chelimo	Uganda	29:07
8	Thierry Ndikumwenayo	Spain	29:16
9	Denis Kipkoech Kemboi Kipkemoi	Kenya	29:18
10	Keneth Kiprop	Uganda	29:20
11	Yann Schrub	France	29:22
12	Parker Wolfe	United States	29:28
13	Adriaan Wildschutt	South Africa	29:32
14	Wesley Kiptoo	United States	29:34
15	Jimmy Gressier	France	29:36
16	Brian Fay	Ireland	29:37
17	Kevin Chesang	Kenya	29:39
18	Nibret Kinde	Ethiopia	29:40
19	Graham Blanks	United States	29:41
20	Gabriel Geay	Tanzania	29:45
21	Emmanuel Kibet	Uganda	29:46
22	Abdessamad Oukhelfen	Spain	29:49
23	Emanuel Dinday	Tanzania	29:54
24	Ky Robinson	Australia	29:56
25	Edward Marks	Australia	29:58
26	David Mullarkey	United Kingdom	30:00
27	Shadrack Koech	Kenya	30:01
28	Simon Sundström	Sweden	30:01
29	Benjamin Ratsim	Tanzania	30:07
30	Aarón Las Heras	Spain	30:12
31	Morgan McDonald	Australia	30:12
32	Etienne Daguinos	France	30:13
33	Sanele Masondo	South Africa	30:13
34	Valentin Gondouin	France	30:14
35	Bereket Nega	Ethiopia	30:19
36	Nico Young	United States	30:19
37	Fabien Palcau	France	30:25
38	Evan Burke	Canada	30:31
39	Isaac Heyne	Australia	30:38
40	Gulveer Singh	India	30:39
41	Deogracius Musobo	Uganda	30:41
42	Musawenkosi Mnisi	South Africa	30:45
43	Robert Koech	Kenya	30:49
44	Inyasi Nicodemus Sulley	Tanzania	30:50
45	Seth O'Donnell	Australia	30:53
46	Ahmed Muhumed	United States	30:53
47	Toby Gualter	New Zealand	30:54
48	Xavier Perras-Phaneuf	Canada	31:05
49	Godwin Katakura	Zimbabwe	31:09
50	Bennett Seloyi	South Africa	31:12
51	Ryuto Igawa	Japan	31:13
52	Yuma Shimoo	Japan	31:14
53	Matthew Ramsden	United Kingdom	31:15
54	Haftu Strintzos	Australia	31:19
55	Assaf Harari	Israel	31:30
56	Jaime Migallon	Spain	31:34
57	Matt Talbot	Canada	31:34
58	MacCallum Rowe	New Zealand	31:36
59	Jayde Rosslee	South Africa	31:37
60	Sawan Barwal	India	31:37
61	Philippe Morneau-Cartier	Canada	31:38
62	Hiroto Yoshioka	Japan	31:39
63	Tomas Vega	Argentina	31:39
64	Oliver Diaz	Venezuela	31:36
65	César Daniel Gomez Ponce	Mexico	31:47
66	German Vega	Argentina	31:57
67	Arturo Israel Reyna	Mexico	31:58
68	Derebe Ayele	Israel	31:59
69	Adisu Guadia	Israel	32:02
70	Ma Wenliang	China	32:05
71	Jacob Cann	United Kingdom	32:07
72	Paul Ramírez	Peru	32:18
73	William Little	New Zealand	32:28
74	Omar Ramos	Peru	32:36
75	John Nahhay Wele	Tanzania	32:37
76	Yacine Guermali	Philippines	32:39
77	Daiki Ozawa	Japan	32:44
78	Tang Haoran	China	32:49
79	Rory Leonard	United Kingdom	32:50
80	Luis Alberto Orta	Venezuela	32:51
81	Divan Du Plooy	Namibia	32:52
82	Karel Hussar	Estonia	32:54
83	Yeshnil Karan	Fiji	32:55
84	Mario López	Mexico	32:58
85	Abhishek Pal	India	33:01
86	Jhon Atachagua	Peru	33:03
87	Bradley Makuvire	Zimbabwe	33:05
88	Zayed Al Sayd	Lebanon	33:09
89	Chen Zhongping	China	33:11
90	Kristers Kudlis	Latvia	33:22
91	Manuel Rojas	Argentina	33:24
92	Santiago Gaitan	Canada	33:37
93	Liu Xing	China	33:46
94	Chris Mhlanga	South Africa	33:49
95	Munir Kabbara	Lebanon	33:50
96	Taonga Mbambo	New Zealand	33:53
97	Sadio Fenner	Ivory Coast	33:55
98	Diego Adolfo Garcia	Mexico	33:55
99	Zade Kayyali	Jordan	34:06
100	Nelson Ito Ccuro	Peru	34:09
101	Wang Wenjie	China	34:15
102	Victor Aguilar Mamani	Bolivia	34:30
103	Dilu Bob	Papua New Guinea	34:31
104	Tian Weizheng	China	34:56
105	Gabriel Guzman	Venezuela	35:51
106	Gaylord Silly	Seychelles	35:57
107	Felice Covillon	French Polynesia	36:18
108	Ethan Yan	Singapore	36:19
109	Seng Tou IP	Macau	36:48
110	Iván Zarco	Honduras	36:51
111	Benjamin Ashkettle	Fiji	37:07
112	Charbel Sejaan	Lebanon	37:16
113	Michel Simon Darazi	Lebanon	37:43
114	Hugh Kent	Guam	38:23
—	Uriel Muñoz	Argentina	DNF
—	Mohammed Ahmed	Canada	DNF
—	Mezgebu Sime	Ethiopia	DNF
—	Oliver Chignell	New Zealand	DNF
—	Connor Melton	New Zealand	DNF
—	Omer Elfadi	Sudan	DNF
—	Dan Kibet	Uganda	DNF
—	Wayne Kabondo	Zimbabwe	DNF
—	Rocky Hansen	United States	DNS

Team
Rank	Team	Score
1st place, gold medalist(s)	Ethiopia: Berihu Aregawi / 2; Tadese Worku / 4; Biniam Mehary / 6; Nibret Kinde / 18; (Bereket Nega) / (35); (Mezgebu Sime) / (DNF)	30
2nd place, silver medalist(s)	Kenya: Daniel Ebenyo / 3; Ishmael Kipkurui / 5; Denis Kipkoech / 9; Kevin Chesang / 17; (Shadrack Kipngetich Koech) / (27); (Robert Kiprop) / (43)	34
3rd place, bronze medalist(s)	Uganda: Jacob Kiplimo / 1; Dolphine Chelimo / 7; Keneth Kiprop / 10; Emmanuel Kibet / 21; (Deogracius Musobo) / (41); (Dan Kibet) / (DNF)	39
4	United States: Parker Wolfe / 12; Wesley Kiptoo / 14; Graham Blanks / 19; Nico Young / 36; (Ahmed Muhumed) / (46); (Rocky Hansen) / (DNS)	81
5	France: Yann Schrub / 11; Jimmy Gressier / 15; Etienne Daguinos / 32; Valentin Gondouin / 34; (Fabien Palcau) / (37)	92
6	Tanzania: Gabriel Geay / 20; Emanuel Dinday / 23; Benjamin Ratsim / 29; Inyasi Nicodemus Sulley / 44; (John Nahhay Wele) / (75)	116
7	Spain: Thierry Ndikumwenayo / 8; Abdessamad Oukhelfen / 22; Aarón Las Heras / 30; Jaime Migallón / 56	116
8	Australia: Ky Robinson / 24; Edward Marks / 25; Morgan McDonald / 31; Isaac Heyne / 39; (Seth O'Donnell) / (45); (Haftu Strintzos) / (54)	119
9	South Africa: Adriaan Wildschutt / 13; Sanele Masondo / 33; Musawenkosi Mnisi / 42; Bennett Seloyi / 50; (Jayde Rosslee) / (59); (Chris Mhlanga) / (94)	138
10	Canada: Evan Burke / 38; Xavier Perras-Phaneuf / 48; Matt Talbot / 57; Philippe Morneau-Cartier / 61; (Santiago Gaitan) / (92); (Mohammed Ahmed) / -	204
11	United Kingdom: David Mullarkey / 26; Matthew Ramsden / 53; Jacob Cann / 71; Rory Leonard / 79	229
12	Japan: Ryuto Igawa / 51; Yuma Shimoo / 52; Hiroto Yoshioka / 62; Daiki Ozawa / 77	242
13	New Zealand: Toby Gualter / 47; MacCallum Rowe / 58; William Little / 73; Taonga Mbambo / 96; (Oliver Chignell) / (DNF); (Connor Melton) / (DNF)	274
14	Mexico: César Daniel Gomez Ponce / 65; Arturo Israel Reyna / 67; Mario López / 84; Diego Adolfo Garcia / 98	314
15	China: Ma Wenliang / 70; Tang Haoran / 78; Chen Zhongping / 89; Liu Xing / 93; (Wang Wenjie) / (101); (Tian Weizheng) / (104)	330
16	Peru: Paul Ramírez / 72; Omar Ramos / 74; Jhon Atachagua / 86; Nelson Ito Ccuro / 100	332
17	Lebanon: Zayed Al Sayd / 88; Munir Kabbara / 95; Charbel Sejaan / 112; Michel Simon Darazi / 113	408

=== Senior women ===
Individual race
Rank	Athlete	Time
1st place, gold medalist(s)	Agnes Jebet Ngetich (Kenya)	31:28
2nd place, silver medalist(s)	Joy Cheptoyek (Uganda)	32:10
3rd place, bronze medalist(s)	Senayet Getachew (Ethiopia)	32:13
4	Asayech Ayichew (Ethiopia)	32:44
5	Aleshign Baweke (Ethiopia)	32:49
6	Rispa Cherop (Uganda)	32:52
7	Alem Tsadik (Ethiopia)	33:00
8	Maurine Jepkoech Chebor (Kenya)	33:06
9	Sarah Chelangat (Uganda)	33:20
10	Ednah Kurgat (United States)	33:28
11	Caren Chebet (Kenya)	33:31
12	Shure Demise (Ethiopia)	33:33
13	Lauren Ryan (Australia)	33:47
14	Maria Forero (Spain)	33:53
15	Leanne Pompeani (Australia)	33:53
16	Rebecca Mwangi (Kenya)	33:55
17	Karissa Schweizer (United States)	33:58
18	Sarah Lahti (Sweden)	34:00
19	Hannah Gapes (New Zealand)	34:01
20	Rebecca Chelangat (Uganda)	34:06
21	Niamh Allen (Ireland)	34:19
22	Joyline Chepkemoi (Kenya)	34:20
23	Fiona Everard (Ireland)	34:22
24	Katie Izzo (United States)	34:25
25	Megan Keith (United Kingdom)	34:25
26	Lemlem Nibret (Ethiopia)	34:27
27	Martha Chemutai (Uganda)	34:30
28	Idaira Prieto (Spain)	34:32
29	Poppy Tank (United Kingdom)	34:39
30	Carolina Robles (Spain)	34:42
31	Chloe Thomas (Canada)	34:46
32	Grace Hartman (United States)	34:47
33	Emily Venters (United States)	34:48
34	Glenrose Xaba (South Africa)	34:51
35	Phoebe Anderson (United Kingdom)	34:52
36	Maudie Skyring (Australia)	34:54
37	Brenda Kenei (Kenya)	35:04
38	Makenna Fitzgerald (Canada)	35:17
39	Bronte Oates (Australia)	35:24
40	Weini Kelati Frezghi (United States)	35:25
41	Verity Ockenden (United Kingdom)	35:29
42	Grace Fetherstonhaugh (Canada)	35:32
43	Kyla Jacobs (South Africa)	35:36
44	Holly Campbell (Australia)	35:38
45	Cacisile Sosibo (South Africa)	35:40
46	Sheyla Eulogio Paucar (Peru)	35:44
47	Ceili McCabe (Canada)	35:47
48	Wakana Itsuki (Japan)	35:57
49	Kereen Chemusto (Uganda)	36:09
50	Karabo Mailula (South Africa)	36:14
51	Angela Viciosa (Spain)	36:20
52	Sabrina Salcedo García (Mexico)	36:21
53	Momoka Kawaguchi (Japan)	36:21
54	Caitlin Adams (Australia)	36:24
55	Cian Oldknow (South Africa)	36:25
56	Juliana Sakat (Ghana)	36:28
57	Florence Caron (Canada)	36:31
58	Sophie Hicks (New Zealand)	36:50
59	Glynis Sim (Canada)	37:04
60	Sora Shinozakura (Japan)	37:10
61	Li Qingqing (China)	37:13
62	Katrina Andrew (New Zealand)	37:19
63	Liis-Grete Hussar (Estonia)	37:29
64	Layla Almasri (Palestine)	37:33
65	Benita Parra Sánchez (Bolivia)	37:36
66	Zarita Suárez (Peru)	37:37
67	Zanele Maisa (South Africa)	37:43
68	Arian Iveth Chia Hernández (Mexico)	37:44
69	Li Yuan (China)	37:53
70	Wang Panpan (China)	38:11
71	Caroline Fungisai Mhandu (Zimbabwe)	38:38
72	Marta Vazquez (Mexico)	38:55
73	Maribel Ayquipa (Peru)	38:57
74	Shuanglu Pan (China)	39:08
75	Liz Anani Durand (Peru)	39:14
76	Chen Yuxuan (China)	39:32
77	Vanessa Ying Zhuang Lee (Singapore)	41:22
78	Nicole Low (Singapore)	41:27
79	Louise Grosgogeat (French Polynesia)	41:33
80	Nathania Tan (Northern Mariana Islands)	41:48
81	Xuan Jie Ng (Singapore)	41:57
82	Rachel Conhoff (United States Virgin Islands)	42:25
83	Monica Kalua (Papua New Guinea)	44:24
84	Nada El Kurdi (Lebanon)	44:31
85	Nour Al Ghoussaini (Lebanon)	44:39
86	Faith Zhen Ford (Singapore)	44:57
87	Karine Shraim (Lebanon)	46:44
88	Yangyang Wu (Macau)	46:56
89	Jennifer Tomazou (Lebanon)	48:09
90	Answer Brandietta Tasara (Zimbabwe)	DNF

Team race
Rank	Team	Points
1st place, gold medalist(s)	Ethiopia: Senayet Getachew / 3; Asayech Ayichew / 4; Aleshign Baweke / 5; Alem Tsadik / 7; (Shure Demise) / (12); (Lemlem Nibret) / (26)	19
2nd place, silver medalist(s)	Kenya: Agnes Jebet Ngetich / 1; Maurine Chebor / 8; Caren Chebet / 11; Rebecca Mwangi / 16; (Joyline Chepkemoi) / (22); (Brenda Kenei) / (37)	36
3rd place, bronze medalist(s)	Uganda: Joy Cheptoyek / 2; Rispa Cherop / 6; Sarah Chelangat / 9; Rebecca Chelangat / 20; (Martha Chemutai) / (27); (Kereen Chemusto) / (49)	37
4	United States: Ednah Kurgat / 10; Karissa Schweizer / 17; Katie Izzo / 24; Grace Hartman / 32; (Emily Venters) / (33); (Weini Kelati Frezghi) / (40)	83
5	Australia: Lauren Ryan / 13; Leanne Pompeani / 15; Maudie Skyring / 36; Bronte Oates / 39; (Holly Campbell) / (44); (Caitlin Adams) / (54)	103
6	Spain: Maria Forero / 14; Idaira Prieto / 28; Carolina Robles / 30; Angela Viciosa / 51	123
7	United Kingdom: Megan Keith / 25; Poppy Tank / 29; Phoebe Anderson / 35; Verity Ockenden / 41	130
8	Canada: Chloe Thomas / 31; Makenna Fitzgerald / 38; Grace Fetherstonhaugh / 42; Ceili McCabe / 47; (Florence Caron) / (57); (Glynis Sim) / (59)	158
9	South Africa: Glenrose Xaba / 34; Kyla Jacobs / 43; Cacisile Sosibo / 45; Karabo Mailula / 50; (Cian Oldknow) / (55); (Zanele Maisa) / (67)	172
10	Peru: Sheyla Eulogio Paucar / 46; Zarita Suárez / 66; Maribel Ayquipa / 73; Liz Anani Durand / 75	260
11	China: Li Qingqing / 61; Li Yuan / 69; Wang Panpan / 70; Pan Shuanglu / 74; (Chen Yuxuan) / (76)	274
12	Singapore: Vanessa Ying Zhuang Lee / 77; Nicole Low / 78; Xuan Jie Ng / 81; Faith Zhen Ford / 86	322
13	Lebanon: Nada El Kurdi / 84; Nour AL Ghoussaini / 85; Karine Shraim / 87; Jennifer Tomazou / 89	345

=== U20 men ===
Individual race
Rank	Athlete	Time
1st place, gold medalist(s)	Frankline Kibet (Kenya)	23:18
2nd place, silver medalist(s)	Emmanuel Kiprono (Kenya)	23:20
3rd place, bronze medalist(s)	Andrew Alamisi (Kenya)	23:28
4	Andrew Kiptoo (Kenya)	23:42
5	Abraham Cherotich (Uganda)	23:47
6	Brian Kiptarus (Kenya)	23:49
7	Daniel Kiprotich Chelogoi (Uganda)	23:51
8	Edwin Elkana (Kenya)	24:00
9	Solomon Andiema (Uganda)	24:01
10	Dan Kipyeko (Uganda)	24:02
11	Willem Renders (Belgium)	24:13
12	Ayele Sewnet (Ethiopia)	24:14
13	Alois Abraham (France)	24:23
14	Jeremiah Kwemoi (Uganda)	24:24
15	Haruki Niizuma (Japan)	24:31
16	Tyler Daillak (United States)	24:46
17	Sebastian Lörstad (Sweden)	24:56
18	Jackson Spencer (United States)	25:00
19	Daniel Skandera (United States)	25:02
20	Michael Clark (Great Britain)	25:13
21	Junsei Murakami (Japan)	25:17
22	Aidan Torres (United States)	25:20
23	Harrison Boyn (Australia)	25:24
24	Luke Dunham (Great Britain)	25:26
25	Kayden Elliott (Australia)	25:28
26	Brody Clark (Canada)	25:29
27	Campbell Brooks (Australia)	25:29
28	Lachlan Moore (Australia)	25:32
29	Alejandro Ibañez (Spain)	25:35
30	Salvador Wirth (United States)	25:39
31	Ojiro Honda (Japan)	25:52
32	Alex Lennon (Great Britain)	25:53
33	Alejandro De la Viuda (Spain)	25:57
34	Adria Boyano (Spain)	25:58
35	Jonson Hughes (Great Britain)	26:00
36	Kieran Shepherd (Australia)	26:02
37	Chase Capes (Canada)	26:03
38	Noah Harris (Ireland)	26:03
39	Caleb Wagener (New Zealand)	26:12
40	Teo De Frutos (Spain)	26:13
41	Saul Taler (Canada)	26:18
42	Santiago Del Moral (Mexico)	26:19
43	Benkosi Magwara (South Africa)	26:20
44	William Scharf (Canada)	26:22
45	Junior Noah (South Africa)	26:25
46	Kota Tamura (Japan)	26:26
47	Edwar Rely Marquez (Peru)	26:27
48	Yu Jiangfu (China)	26:39
49	George Wyllie (New Zealand)	26:42
50	Kuma Barrios (Spain)	26:47
51	Ma Zilong (China)	26:49
52	Mahmoud Abou Zeid (Lebanon)	27:02
53	Dylan Maloney (United States)	27:03
54	Oliver Crowe (Canada)	27:28
55	Xavi Cabanilles (Spain)	27:29
56	Corban Holmes (New Zealand)	27:29
57	Luo Zhihui (China)	27:31
58	Anele Matsoso (South Africa)	27:41
59	Jackson Nyamazana (Zimbabwe)	27:43
60	Olerato Masiloane (South Africa)	27:48
61	Redd Scampion (New Zealand)	27:55
62	Xie Yuhang (China)	27:59
63	Eli Torrie (Canada)	28:01
64	Ayde Cintron (United States Virgin Islands)	28:21
65	Bede Colbourne (New Zealand)	28:30
66	Beutin Van der Westhuizen (South Africa)	29:10
67	Danny Kuran (Jordan)	30:22
68	Hugo Sullca (Peru)	30:22
69	Nash Victor Maniego Santos (Northern Mariana Islands)	33:28
70	Brayden Noonan (Australia)	DNF
71	Rikuto Ikeya (Japan)	DNF
72	Tshepang Tshivula (South Africa)	DNF
73	Kain Inagaki (Japan)	DNF

Team race
Rank	Team	Points
1st place, gold medalist(s)	Kenya: Frankline Kibet / 1; Emmanuel Kiprono / 2; Andrew Alamisi / 3; Andrew Kiptoo / 4; (Brian Kiptarus) / (6); (Edwin Elkana) / (8)	10
2nd place, silver medalist(s)	Uganda: Abraham Cherotich / 5; Daniel Kiprotich Chelogoi / 7; Solomon Andiema / 9; Dan Kipyeko / 10; (Jeremiah Kwemoi) / (14)	31
3rd place, bronze medalist(s)	United States: Tyler Daillak / 16; Jackson Spencer / 18; Daniel Skandera / 19; Aidan Torres / 22; (Salvador Wirth) / (30); (Dylan Maloney) / (53)	75
4	Australia: Harrison Boyn / 23; Kayden Elliott / 25; Campbell Brooks / 27; Lachlan Moore / 28; (Kieran Shepherd) / (36); (Brayden Noonan) / (70)	103
5	United Kingdom: Michael Clark / 20; Luke Dunham / 24; Alex Lennon / 32; Jonson Hughes / 35	111
6	Japan: Haruki Niizuma / 15; Junsei Murakami / 21; Ojiro Honda / 31; Kota Tamura / 46; (Rikuto Ikeya) / (71); (Kain Inagaki) / (73)	113
7	Spain: Alejandro Ibañez / 29; Alejandro De la Viuda / 33; Adria Boyano / 34; Teo De Frutos / 40; (Kuma Barrios) / (50); (Xavi Cabanilles) / (55)	136
8	Canada: Brody Clark / 26; Chase Capes / 37; Saul Taler / 41; William Scharf / 44; (Oliver Crowe) / 54); (Eli Torrie) / (63)	148
9	New Zealand: Caleb Wagener / 39; George Wyllie / 49; Corban Holmes / 56; Redd Scampion / 61; (Bede Colbourne) / (65)	205
10	South Africa: Benkosi Magwara / 43; Junior Noah / 45; Anele Matsoso / 58; Olerato Masiloane / 60; (Beutin Van der Westhuizen) / (66); (Tshepang Tshivula) / (72)	206
11	China: Yu Jiangfu / 48; Ma Zilong / 51; Luo Zhihui / 57; Xie Yuhang / 62	218

=== U20 women ===
Individual race
Rank	Athlete	Time
1st place, gold medalist(s)	Marta Alemayo (Ethiopia)	18:52
2nd place, silver medalist(s)	Wosane Asefa (Ethiopia)	19:18
3rd place, bronze medalist(s)	Charity Cherop (Uganda)	19:19
4	Cynthia Chepkirui (Kenya)	19:22
5	Yenenesh Shimeket (Ethiopia)	19:35
6	Joan Chepkurui (Kenya)	19:43
7	Bentalin Yeko (Uganda)	19:50
8	Mercy Chepngeno (Kenya)	19:52
9	Felister Chekwemoi (Uganda)	19:53
10	Peace Chebet (Uganda)	19:54
11	Miriam Chemutai Kibet (Kenya)	20:00
12	Nancy Chepkwurui (Uganda)	20:12
13	Lonah Cherono (Kenya)	20:20
14	Yui Onotora (Japan)	20:25
15	Caren Chepngeno (Kenya)	20:35
16	Blair Bartlett (United States)	20:36
17	Hu Jinhua (China)	20:38
18	Adrianna Buitelaar (Canada)	20:45
19	Isabella Valinoti (Australia)	20:50
20	Daniela Scheffler (United States)	20:53
21	Fanny Szalkai (Sweden)	20:56
22	Wakana Fukuyama (Japan)	20:56
23	Helena Butler (Australia)	21:00
24	Rong Rong (China)	21:01
25	Mona Utsunomiya (Japan)	21:03
26	Mei Hosomi (Japan)	21:04
27	Lara Stander (South Africa)	21:15
28	Debris Paniagua (Spain)	21:17
29	Michi Kawanishi (Japan)	21:18
30	Eleanor Voykin (Canada)	21:19
31	Airi Mashiba (Japan)	21:20
32	Eliza Lawton (Australia)	21:20
33	Abigail Sewell (United States)	21:23
34	Andrea Steynberg (South Africa)	21:23
35	Addison Houslip (Australia)	21:26
36	Eliza Nicholson (Great Britain)	21:30
37	Demeku Paniagua (Spain)	21:32
38	Claudia Gutierrez (Spain)	21:34
39	Caroline Barton (United States)	21:35
40	Kayley Torrie (Canada)	21:49
41	Libby Mantay (Australia)	21:52
42	Sandra Gonzalez (Spain)	21:54
43	Athena Andrecyk (Canada)	22:02
44	Wang Yuhan (China)	22:06
45	Piper Anderson (Australia)	22:09
46	Lara Van der Merwe (South Africa)	22:13
47	Zoe Mosher (Canada)	22:14
48	Scarlett Robb (New Zealand)	22:15
49	Zara Redmond (Great Britain)	22:21
50	Mara Rolli (Spain)	22:24
51	Brynne Gordon (New Zealand)	22:29
52	Deng Yue (China)	22:30
53	Norah Hushagen (United States)	22:33
54	Maisey Bellwood (Great Britain)	22:48
55	Denika Clooney (New Zealand)	22:51
56	Ithuteng Khiba (South Africa)	22:55
57	Amanda Roman (Spain)	22:56
58	Avery Marasco-Johnson (United States)	23:01
59	Riley Innes (Canada)	23:02
60	Eleanor Pugh (New Zealand)	23:04
61	Leandri Pretorius (South Africa)	23:22
62	Poppy Healy (New Zealand)	23:33
63	Tulange Mudenda (Zimbabwe)	24:18
64	Omaatla Dikao (South Africa)	24:41
65	Noora Shihab Ahmad Kuran (Jordan)	27:21
66	Kitty Rose Scott (Great Britain)	DNF

Team race
Rank	Team	Points
1st place, gold medalist(s)	Uganda: Charity Cherop / 3; Bentalin Yeko / 7; Felister Chekwemoi / 9; Peace Chebet / 10; (Nancy Chepkwurui) / (12)	29
2nd place, silver medalist(s)	Kenya: Cynthia Chepkirui / 4; Joan Chepkurui / 6; Mercy Chepngeno / 8; Miriam Chemutai Kibet / 11; (Lonah Cherono) / (13); (Caren Chepngeno) / (15)	29
3rd place, bronze medalist(s)	Japan: Yui Onotora / 14; Wakana Fukuyama / 22; Mona Utsunomiya / 25; Mei Hosomi / 26; (Michi Kawanishi) / (29); (Airi Mashiba) / (31)	87
4	United States: Blair Bartlett / 16; Daniela Scheffler / 20; Abigail Sewell / 33; Caroline Barton / 39; (Norah Hushagen) / (53); (Avery Marasco-Johnson) / (58)	108
5	Australia: Isabella Valinoti / 19; Helena Butler / 23; Eliza Lawton / 32; Addison Houslip / 35; (Libby Mantay) / (41); (Piper Anderson) / (45)	109
6	Canada: Adrianna Buitelaar / 18; Eleanor Voykin / 30; Kayley Torrie / 40; Athena Andrecyk / 43; (Zoe Mosher) / (47); (Riley Innes) / (59)	131
7	China: Hu Jinhua / 17; Rong Rong / 24; Wang Yuhan / 44; Deng Yue / 52	137
8	Spain: Debris Paniagua / 28; Demeku Paniagua / 37; Claudia Gutierrez / 38; Sandra Gonzalez / 42; (Mara Rolli) / (50); (Amanda Roman) / (57)	145
9	South Africa: Lara Stander / 27; Andrea Steynberg / 34; Lara Van der Merwe / 46; Ithuteng Khiba / 56; (Leandri Pretorius) / (61); (Omaatla Dikao) / (64)	163
10	New Zealand: Scarlett Robb / 48; Brynne Gordon / 51; Denika Clooney / 55; Eleanor Pugh / 60; (Poppy Healy) / (62)	214

== Controversies ==
At least 14 Ethiopian athletes were denied visas to enter the United States to participate in this competition. Ethiopia was unable to field teams in the men's and women's U20 races, ending Ethiopia's record of medaling in those competitions.

Although Ethiopia had won men's U20 team medals every year since 1982, in 2026 there was no Ethiopian U20 men's team as the US refused visas for all but one of the six men selected. Since their debut in 1990, Ethiopia's U20 women had won medals in 27 consecutive championships, including team golds at the last five events. In 2026, only three Ethiopian U20 women of six selected were granted visas. Four athletes are needed to complete a junior team at the world cross-country. According to Ethiopian officials, 23 of the original 34 visa requests were rejected.
