= Cynthia Chepkirui =

Kenyan runner (born 2008)

Personal information
- Nationality: Kenya
- Born: 4 September 2008 (age 18)

Sport
- Sport: Athletics
- Events: long-distance running, Cross country running

Achievements and titles
- Personal bests: 1500m: 4:21.42 (Nairobi, 2025); 3000m: 9:06.98 (Nairobi, 2025); 5000m: 15:06.48 (Doha, 2026)
Medal record
Women's athletics
Representing Kenya
African U18 Championships
Gold medal – first place	2025 Abeokuta	3000m
World Cross Country Championships
Silver medal – second place	2026 Tallahassee	U20 team

Cynthia Chepkirui (born 4 September 2008) is a Kenyan long-distance and cross county runner.

== Biography ==
From Nairobi, she trained at the Lemotit Training Camp under coach Paul Kemei. In December 2024, she won the 2024 Chepsaita cross country under-20 race.

In February 2025, Chepkirui was the winner of the 4th edition of the Sirikwa Classic U20 Cross Country championships in Eldoret. She placed fourth over 5000 metres at the 2025 Kip Keino Classic in 15:24.30. In June 2025, she was runner-up at the Kenyan Athletics Championships behind Rebecca Mwangi. Chepkirui also won the 5000 metres in 15:37.83 at the Athletics Kenya age-group national trials in Nakuru County ahead of the Confederation of Africa Athletics (CAA) championships in Nigeria. At the African U18 Championships the following month, she won the 3000 metres gold medal in 9:26.35.

She won the under-20 6 km women's race at the Kenyan Cross Country Championships in Eldoret on 25 October 2025. On 8 November, she won the women's 6 km race at the Cardiff Cross Challenge in Wales, a gold race part of the World Athletics Cross Country Tour, finishing ahead of compatriot Sheila Jebet.

In January 2026, she competed in the Kenyan team for the U20 race at the 2026 World Athletics Cross Country Championships in Tallahassee, placing fourth in the individual race and winning the silver medal in the team event. In May, she won the women's 5000 metres in 15:24.40 ahead of Joyline Chepkemoi at the Kenyan U20 Trials in Nairobi. On 19 June, she ran a 15:06.48 personal best for the 5000 metres at the 2026 Doha Diamond League. Representing her country over 5000 metres she placed fourth at the 2026 World Athletics U20 Championships. In November, she placed third at the Cross Internacional de Itálica in Seville and second at the Cross Internacional de Soria.
