= Kevin Chesang =

Kenyan long-distance runner

Personal information
- Full name: Kevin Chepsergon Chesang
- Born: 1 July 2005 (age 21)

Sport
- Sport: Athletics
- Event(s): Long-distance running, Cross country running

Achievements and titles
- Personal best(s): 10,000m: 28:31.50 (Nairobi, 2026)
Medal record
Men's athletics
Representing Kenya
African Championships
Gold medal – first place	2026 Accra	10,000 m

Kevin Chepsergon Chesang (born 1 July 2005) is a Kenyan long-distance and cross country runner. He represented Kenya at the 2026 World Athletics Cross Country Championships.

== Biography ==
A product of the Townhall Sinonin Camp, Chesang placed second behind Daniel Ebenyo at the Kenyan Cross Country Championships over 10 km in Eldoret on 25 October 2025. He was subsequently selected to represent Kenya at the 2026 World Athletics Cross Country Championships in Tallahassee, United States. It marked his first race outside Kenya. He was the fourth Kenyan finisher in seventeenth place.

In April 2026, Chesang ran a personal best of 28:38.52 for 10,000 metres to win on the track at the Kenyan Trials. Later that month, won over 10,000 metres in a time of 28:31.50 at his debut race at the Kip Keino Classic in Nairobi on 24 April 2026. In May, he represented Kenya in the 10,000 metres at the 2026 African Championships in Athletics in Accra, Ghana, winning the gold medal ahesd of Hagos Eyob of Ethiopia and his Kenyan compatriot Silas Senchura.
