= Rebecca Chelangat =

Ugandan long-distance runner (born 2002)

Personal information
- Born: 1 January 2002 (age 24)

Sport
- Country: Uganda
- Sport: Long-distance running
- Event: Half marathon

Achievements and titles
- Personal bests: 10,000 m: 31:21.74 (Leiden 2025); Road; 10 km: 30:59 (Tokyo 2025); Half marathon: 1:07:18 NR (Seville 2025)
Medal record
Women's athletics
Representing Uganda
World Cross Country Championships
Bronze medal – third place	2026 Tallahassee	Senior team
Islamic Solidarity Games
Gold medal – first place	2025 Riyadh	10,000 m

Rebecca Chelangat (born 1 January 2002) is a Ugandan long-distance runner.

== Career ==
In 2024, she won Ugandan Championships in the 5000m. She also earned silver in the Bangsaen21 Half Marathon.

In 2025, she won the Sevilla Half Marathon running a Ugandan national record time of 1:07:18. She also claimed 10,000 m titles at the Gouden Spike in Leiden and the Ugandan National Championships and was therefore picked to represent Uganda at the 2025 World Athletics Championships in Tokyo. She did not finish in the final.
