= Joy Cheptoyek =

Ugandan athlete (born 2002)

Personal information
- Nationality: Ugandan
- Born: 15 May 2002 (age 24)

Sport
- Sport: Athletics
- Event: Long distance running

Achievements and titles
- Personal bests: 5000m 14:40.27 (Oordegem, 2025) NR; 10000m 30:41.95 (Nairobi, 2025); 5km (road) (Riga, 2023) 14.28 NR; 10km (road) (Valencia, 2023) 30.03 NR
Medal record
Women's athletics
Representing Uganda
World Cross Country Championships
Silver medal – second place	2026 Tallahassee	Senior race
Bronze medal – third place	2026 Tallahassee	Senior team

Joy Cheptoyek (born 15 May 2002) is an Ugandan long distance and cross country runner. She placed sixth over 5 km at the 2023 World Athletics Road Running Championships and seventh over 10,000 metres at the 2025 World Athletics Championships. That year, she became Uganda national cross country champion.

== Biography ==
In June 2023, she ran a 10,000 metres personal best in Hengelo, recording a time of 32:09.52. The following month, she ran a new personal best time of 15:24.88 for the 5000 metres, in Nairobi.

In November 2023, she finished sixth over 5 km at the World Road Running Championships in Riga, in a Ugandan national record of 14:50.

In January 2024, at the Valencia Ibercaja 10k she ran a new personal best and national record of 30:03.

In March 2024, she was selected for the World Cross Country Championships in Serbia. She was selected for the 5000 metres at the 2024 Summer Olympics in Paris in August 2024 but did not race.

In March 2025, she ran a 1:08.00 half marathon in Málaga, Spain. In May 2025, she won over 10 km on the road in Tokyo, Japan in 30:22. In July 2025, she ran a new personal best for the 10,000 metres on the track of 30:41.95 in Nairobi, Kenya. In September 2025, she competed in the women's 10,0000 metres at the 2025 World Athletics Championships in Tokyo, placing seventh overall. She was also a finalist in the women's 5000 metres race.

Cheptoyek won the Ugandan national cross country championships in Mbale in November 2025. In January 2026, she was confirmed in the Uganda team for the 2026 World Athletics Cross Country Championships in Tallahassee, where she won the silver medal in the senior women's race to become Uganda's first ever individual medallist in the event at the championships. She also won the bronze medal with Uganda in the team event at the championships.

Cheptoyek placed sixth in the 10,000 metres and tenth competing in the 5000 metres at the 2026 Commonwealth Games in Glasgow, Scotland.
