= 2026 World Athletics Cross Country Championships – Senior men's race =

Senior men's race at the 2026 World Athletics Cross Country Championships
- Organisers: World Athletics
- Edition: 46th
- Date: January 10, 2026
- Host city: Tallahassee, Florida, United States
- Participation: 123 athletes from 40 nations

The Senior Men's Race at the 2026 World Athletics Cross Country Championships was held at Tallahassee, Florida, United States on January 10, 2026. Jacob Kiplimo won a third consecutive gold medal in the individual classification, with Ethiopian Berihu Aregawi finishing second.

== Prize Money ==
Rank	Championship	
Rank	Individual	Team
Gold	US$30,000	US$20,000
Silver	US$15,000	US$16,000
Bronze	US$10,000	US$12,000
Fourth	US$7000	US$10,000
Fifth	US$5000	US$8000
Sixth	US$3000	US$4000

== Race Results ==
=== Senior Men's Race (10 km) ===
- Video on World Athletics on YouTube
- Athletes in parentheses did not score for the team result.

Individual
Rank	Athlete	Country	Time
1st place, gold medalist(s)	Jacob Kiplimo	Uganda	28:18
2nd place, silver medalist(s)	Berihu Aregawi	Ethiopia	28:36
3rd place, bronze medalist(s)	Daniel Ebenyo	Kenya	28:45
4	Tadese Worku	Ethiopia	28:49
5	Ishmael Kipkurui	Kenya	28:53
6	Biniam Mehary	Ethiopia	29:03
7	Dolphine Chelimo	Uganda	29:07
8	Thierry Ndikumwenayo	Spain	29:16
9	Denis Kipkoech Kemboi Kipkemoi	Kenya	29:18
10	Keneth Kiprop	Uganda	29:20
11	Yann Schrub	France	29:22
12	Parker Wolfe	United States	29:28
13	Adriaan Wildschutt	South Africa	29:32
14	Wesley Kiptoo	United States	29:34
15	Jimmy Gressier	France	29:36
16	Brian Fay	Ireland	29:37
17	Kevin Chesang	Kenya	29:39
18	Nibret Kinde	Ethiopia	29:40
19	Graham Blanks	United States	29:41
20	Gabriel Geay	Tanzania	29:45
21	Emmanuel Kibet	Uganda	29:46
22	Abdessamad Oukhelfen	Spain	29:49
23	Emanuel Dinday	Tanzania	29:54
24	Ky Robinson	Australia	29:56
25	Edward Marks	Australia	29:58
26	David Mullarkey	United Kingdom	30:00
27	Shadrack Koech	Kenya	30:01
28	Simon Sundström	Sweden	30:01
29	Benjamin Ratsim	Tanzania	30:07
30	Aarón Las Heras	Spain	30:12
31	Morgan McDonald	Australia	30:12
32	Etienne Daguinos	France	30:13
33	Sanele Masondo	South Africa	30:13
34	Valentin Gondouin	France	30:14
35	Bereket Nega	Ethiopia	30:19
36	Nico Young	United States	30:19
37	Fabien Palcau	France	30:25
38	Evan Burke	Canada	30:31
39	Isaac Heyne	Australia	30:38
40	Gulveer Singh	India	30:39
41	Deogracius Musobo	Uganda	30:41
42	Musawenkosi Mnisi	South Africa	30:45
43	Robert Koech	Kenya	30:49
44	Inyasi Nicodemus Sulley	Tanzania	30:50
45	Seth O'Donnell	Australia	30:53
46	Ahmed Muhumed	United States	30:53
47	Toby Gualter	New Zealand	30:54
48	Xavier Perras-Phaneuf	Canada	31:05
49	Godwin Katakura	Zimbabwe	31:09
50	Bennett Seloyi	South Africa	31:12
51	Ryuto Igawa	Japan	31:13
52	Yuma Shimoo	Japan	31:14
53	Matthew Ramsden	United Kingdom	31:15
54	Haftu Strintzos	Australia	31:19
55	Assaf Harari	Israel	31:30
56	Jaime Migallon	Spain	31:34
57	Matt Talbot	Canada	31:34
58	MacCallum Rowe	New Zealand	31:36
59	Jayde Rosslee	South Africa	31:37
60	Sawan Barwal	India	31:37
61	Philippe Morneau-Cartier	Canada	31:38
62	Hiroto Yoshioka	Japan	31:39
63	Tomas Vega	Argentina	31:39
64	Oliver Diaz	Venezuela	31:36
65	César Gomez Ponce	Mexico	31:47
66	German Vega	Argentina	31:57
67	Arturo Reyna	Mexico	31:58
68	Derebe Ayele	Israel	31:59
69	Adisu Guadia	Israel	32:02
70	Ma Wenliang	China	32:05
71	Jacob Cann	United Kingdom	32:07
72	Paul Ramírez	Peru	32:18
73	William Little	New Zealand	32:28
74	Omar Ramos	Peru	32:36
75	John Nahhay Wele	Tanzania	32:37
76	Yacine Guermali	Philippines	32:39
77	Daiki Ozawa	Japan	32:44
78	Tang Haoran	China	32:49
79	Rory Leonard	United Kingdom	32:50
80	Luis Alberto Orta	Venezuela	32:51
81	Divan Du Plooy	Namibia	32:52
82	Karel Hussar	Estonia	32:54
83	Yeshnil Karan	Fiji	32:55
84	Mario López	Mexico	32:58
85	Abhishek Pal	India	33:01
86	Jhon Atachagua	Peru	33:03
87	Bradley Makuvire	Zimbabwe	33:05
88	Zayed Al Sayd	Lebanon	33:09
89	Chen Zhongping	China	33:11
90	Kristers Kudlis	Latvia	33:22
91	Manuel Rojas	Argentina	33:24
92	Santiago Gaitan	Canada	33:37
93	Liu Xing	China	33:46
94	Chris Mhlanga	South Africa	33:49
95	Munir Kabbara	Lebanon	33:50
96	Taonga Mbambo	New Zealand	33:53
97	Sadio Fenner	Ivory Coast	33:55
98	Diego Garcia	Mexico	33:55
99	Zade Kayyali	Jordan	34:06
100	Nelson Ito Ccuro	Peru	34:09
101	Wang Wenjie	China	34:15
102	Victor Aguilar Mamani	Bolivia	34:30
103	Dilu Bob	Papua New Guinea	34:31
104	Tian Weizheng	China	34:56
105	Gabriel Guzman	Venezuela	35:51
106	Gaylord Silly	Seychelles	35:57
107	Felice Covillon	French Polynesia	36:18
108	Ethan Yan	Singapore	36:19
109	Seng Tou IP	Macau	36:48
110	Iván Zarco	Honduras	36:51
111	Benjamin Ashkettle	Fiji	37:07
112	Charbel Sejaan	Lebanon	37:16
113	Michel Simon Darazi	Lebanon	37:43
114	Hugh Kent	Guam	38:23
—	Uriel Muñoz	Argentina	DNF
—	Mohammed Ahmed	Canada	DNF
—	Mezgebu Sime	Ethiopia	DNF
—	Oliver Chignell	New Zealand	DNF
—	Connor Melton	New Zealand	DNF
—	Omer Elfadi	Sudan	DNF
—	Dan Kibet	Uganda	DNF
—	Wayne Kabondo	Zimbabwe	DNF
—	Rocky Hansen	United States	DNS

Team
Rank	Team	Score
1st place, gold medalist(s)	Ethiopia: Berihu Aregawi / 2; Tadese Worku / 4; Biniam Mehary / 6; Nibret Kinde / 18; (Bereket Nega) / (35); (Mezgebu Sime) / (DNF)	30
2nd place, silver medalist(s)	Kenya: Daniel Ebenyo / 3; Ishmael Kipkurui / 5; Denis Kipkoech / 9; Kevin Chesang / 17; (Shadrack Kipngetich Koech) / (27); (Robert Kiprop) / (43)	34
3rd place, bronze medalist(s)	Uganda: Jacob Kiplimo / 1; Dolphine Chelimo / 7; Keneth Kiprop / 10; Emmanuel Kibet / 21; (Deogracius Musobo) / (41); (Dan Kibet) / (DNF)	39
4	United States: Parker Wolfe / 12; Wesley Kiptoo / 14; Graham Blanks / 19; Nico Young / 36; (Ahmed Muhumed) / (46); (Rocky Hansen) / (DNS)	81
5	France: Yann Schrub / 11; Jimmy Gressier / 15; Etienne Daguinos / 32; Valentin Gondouin / 34; (Fabien Palcau) / (37)	92
6	Tanzania: Gabriel Geay / 20; Emanuel Dinday / 23; Benjamin Ratsim / 29; Inyasi Nicodemus Sulley / 44; (John Nahhay Wele) / (75)	116
7	Spain: Thierry Ndikumwenayo / 8; Abdessamad Oukhelfen / 22; Aarón Las Heras / 30; Jaime Migallón / 56	116
8	Australia: Ky Robinson / 24; Edward Marks / 25; Morgan McDonald / 31; Isaac Heyne / 39; (Seth O'Donnell) / (45); (Haftu Strintzos) / (54)	119
9	South Africa: Adriaan Wildschutt / 13; Sanele MASONDO (33) Musawenkosi MNISI (42) Bennett SELOYI (50) Jayde ROSSLEE (59) Chris MHLANGA (94)	138
10	Canada Evan BURKE (38) Xavier PERRAS-PHANEUF (48): Matt Talbot / 57; Philippe MORNEAU-CARTIER (61) Santiago GAITAN (92) Mohammed AHMED	204
11	United Kingdom: David Mullarkey / 26; Matthew Ramsden / 53; Jacob Cann / 71; Rory Leonard / 79	229
12	Japan Ryuto IGAWA (51) Yuma SHIMOO (52) Hiroto YOSHIOKA (62) Daiki OZAWA (77)	242
13	New Zealand: Toby Gualter / 47; MacCallum Rowe / 58; William Little / 73; Taonga Mbambo / 96; (Oliver Chignell) / (DNF); (Connor Melton) / (DNF)	274
14	Mexico César Daniel GOMEZ PONCE (65) Arturo Israel REYNA (67) Mario LÓPEZ (84) Diego Adolfo GARCIA (98)	314
15	China: Ma Wenliang / 70; Tang Haoran / 78; Chen Zhongping / 89; Liu Xing / 93; (Wang Wenjie) / (101); (Tian Weizheng) / (104)	330
16	Peru: Paul Ramírez / 72; Omar RAMOS (74) Jhon Andres ATACHAGUA (86) Nelson ITO CCURO (100)	332
17	Lebanon Zayed AL SAYD (88) Munir KABBARA (95) Charbel SEJAAN (112) Michel Simon DARAZI (113)	408
