= 2023 Athletissima =

Diamond League meetings

- Dates: 30 June 2023
- Host city: Lausanne, Switzerland
- Venue: Stade Olympique de la Pontaise
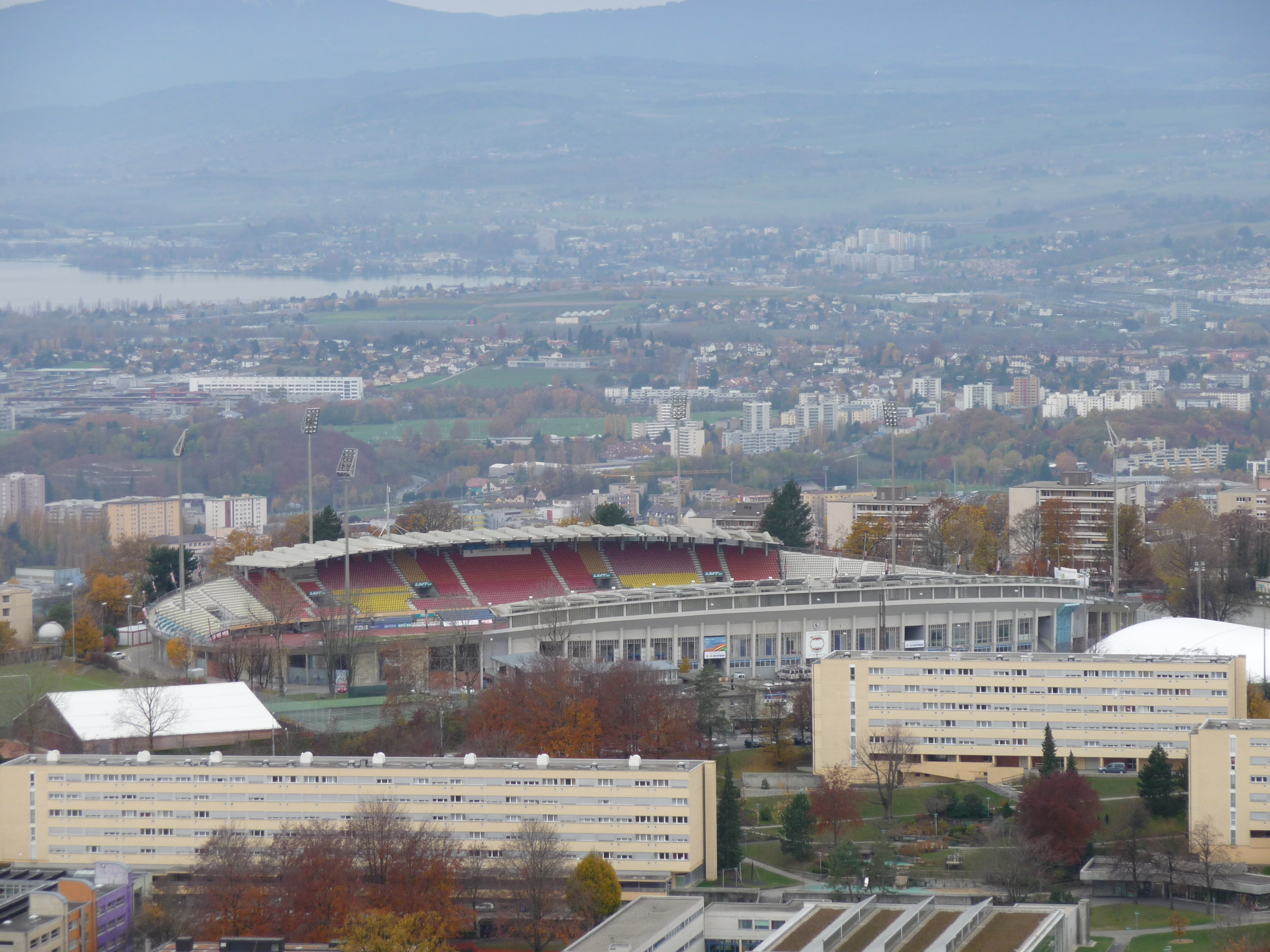
- Level: 2023 Diamond League

The 2023 Athletissima was the 47th edition of the annual outdoor athletics meeting in Lausanne, Switzerland. Held on 30 June at the Stade Olympique de la Pontaise, it was the 6th leg of the 2023 Diamond League – the highest level international track and field circuit.

Just 15 days after two athletes ran 12:41 at the 2023 Bislett Games, Berihu Aregawi ran a new world lead of 12:40 in the 5000 metres, leading some to call 2023 the "year of the 5k".

== Results ==
Athletes competing in the Diamond League disciplines earned extra compensation and points which went towards qualifying for the Diamond League finals. First place earned eight points, with each step down in place earning one less point than the previous, until no points are awarded in 9th place or lower.

=== Diamond Discipline ===
Women's High Jump
Place	Athlete	Country	Mark	Points
1st place, gold medalist(s)	Nicola Olyslagers	Australia	2.02 m	8
2nd place, silver medalist(s)	Iryna Herashchenko	Ukraine	2.00 m	7
3rd place, bronze medalist(s)	Yaroslava Mahuchikh	Ukraine	1.97 m	6
4	Morgan Lake	Great Britain	1.94 m	5
5	Yuliya Levchenko	Ukraine	1.94 m	4
6	Angelina Topić	Serbia	1.94 m	3
7	Daniela Stanciu	Romania	1.94 m	2
8	Nafissatou Thiam	Belgium	1.91 m	1
9	Elisabeth Pihela	Estonia	1.91 m	
10	Salome Lang	Switzerland	1.87 m	
11	Karmen Bruus	Estonia	1.83 m	

Men's 200m (−1.4 m/s)
Place	Athlete	Country	Time	Points
1st place, gold medalist(s)	Letsile Tebogo	Botswana	20.01	8
2nd place, silver medalist(s)	Jereem Richards	Trinidad and Tobago	20.11	7
3rd place, bronze medalist(s)	Joseph Fahnbulleh	Liberia	20.21	6
4	Reynier Mena	Cuba	20.24	5
5	Aaron Brown	Canada	20.44	4
6	Andre De Grasse	Canada	20.57	3
7	William Reais	Switzerland	20.91	2
8	Taymir Burnet	Netherlands	21.30	1

Men's 1500m
Place	Athlete	Country	Time	Points
1st place, gold medalist(s)	Jakob Ingebrigtsen	Norway	3:28.72	8
2nd place, silver medalist(s)	Lamecha Girma	Ethiopia	3:29.51	7
3rd place, bronze medalist(s)	Josh Kerr	Great Britain	3:29.64	6
4	Elliot Giles	Great Britain	3:31.56	5
5	Sam Tanner	New Zealand	3:32.27	4
6	Neil Gourley	Great Britain	3:32.63	3
7	Stewart McSweyn	Australia	3:32.85	2
8	Teddese Lemi	Ethiopia	3:34.21	1
9	Pietro Arese	Italy	3:36.10	
10	Tom Elmer	Switzerland	3:36.54	
11	Julian Ranc	France	3:38.61	
	Erik Sowinski	United States	DNF	
	Mounir Akbache	France	DNF	

Men's 5000m
Place	Athlete	Country	Time	Points
1st place, gold medalist(s)	Berihu Aregawi	Ethiopia	12:40.45	8
2nd place, silver medalist(s)	Joshua Cheptegei	Uganda	12:41.61	7
3rd place, bronze medalist(s)	Hagos Gebrhiwet	Ethiopia	12:49.80	6
4	Telahun Haile Bekele	Ethiopia	12:49.81	5
5	Selemon Barega	Ethiopia	13:00.20	4
6	Birhanu Balew	Bahrain	13:01.41	3
7	Kuma Girma	Ethiopia	13:03.37	2
8	Gemechu Dida	Ethiopia	13:03.50	1
9	Magnus Tuv Myhre	Norway	13:17.79	
10	Ky Robinson	Australia	13:20.96	
11	Jonas Raess	Switzerland	13:22.53	
12	Egide Ntakarutimana	Burundi	13:27.75	
13	Muktar Edris	Ethiopia	13:29.65	
	Andreas Almgren	Sweden	DNF	
	Adam Czerwiński	Poland	DNF	
	Callum Davies	Australia	DNF	

Men's 110mH (−1.0 m/s)
Place	Athlete	Country	Time	Points
1st place, gold medalist(s)	Shunsuke Izumiya	Japan	13.22	8
2nd place, silver medalist(s)	Jason Joseph	Switzerland	13.23	7
3rd place, bronze medalist(s)	Just Kwaou-Mathey	France	13.37	6
4	Lorenzo Simonelli	Italy	13.41	5
5	Enrique Llopis	Spain	13.43	4
6	Rafael Pereira	Brazil	13.56	3
7	Joshua Zeller	Great Britain	13.58	2
	Wilhem Belocian	France	DQ	

Men's Long Jump
Place	Athlete	Country	Mark	Points
1st place, gold medalist(s)	LaQuan Nairn	Bahamas	8.11 m (−0.3 m/s)	8
2nd place, silver medalist(s)	Miltiadis Tentoglou	Greece	8.07 m (−0.8 m/s)	7
3rd place, bronze medalist(s)	Yuki Hashioka	Japan	7.98 m (−1.2 m/s)	6
4	Simon Ehammer	Switzerland	7.97 m (−0.4 m/s)	5
5	Murali Sreeshankar	India	7.88 m (−0.7 m/s)	4
6	Filip Pravdica	Croatia	7.83 m (−0.7 m/s)	3
7	Cheswill Johnson	South Africa	7.78 m (−1.1 m/s)	2
8	Thobias Montler	Sweden	7.75 m (−1.2 m/s)	1
9	Mattia Furlani	Italy	7.73 m (−1.0 m/s)	

Men's Shot Put
Place	Athlete	Country	Mark	Points
1st place, gold medalist(s)	Ryan Crouser	United States	22.29 m	8
2nd place, silver medalist(s)	Tom Walsh	New Zealand	21.99 m	7
3rd place, bronze medalist(s)	Filip Mihaljević	Croatia	21.42 m	6
4	Leonardo Fabbri	Italy	21.41 m	5
5	Zane Weir	Italy	21.36 m	4
6	Adrian Piperi	United States	21.24 m	3
7	Tomáš Staněk	Czech Republic	20.65 m	2
8	Roman Kokoshko	Ukraine	19.98 m	1
9	Armin Sinančević	Serbia	19.50 m	

Men's Javelin Throw
Place	Athlete	Country	Mark	Points
1st place, gold medalist(s)	Neeraj Chopra	India	87.66 m	8
2nd place, silver medalist(s)	Julian Weber	Germany	87.03 m	7
3rd place, bronze medalist(s)	Jakub Vadlejch	Czech Republic	86.13 m	6
4	Oliver Helander	Finland	83.50 m	5
5	Anderson Peters	Grenada	82.23 m	4
6	Artur Felfner	Ukraine	81.89 m	3
7	Keshorn Walcott	Trinidad and Tobago	81.85 m	2
8	Patriks Gailums	Latvia	79.45 m	1
9	Curtis Thompson	United States	74.75 m	

Women's 100m (−0.8 m/s)
Place	Athlete	Country	Time	Points
1st place, gold medalist(s)	Marie-Josée Ta Lou	Ivory Coast	10.88	8
2nd place, silver medalist(s)	Daryll Neita	Great Britain	11.07	7
3rd place, bronze medalist(s)	Gina Lückenkemper	Germany	11.17	6
4	Ewa Swoboda	Poland	11.17	5
5	Zoe Hobbs	New Zealand	11.20	4
6	Imani-Lara Lansiquot	Great Britain	11.24	3
7	Murielle Ahouré-Demps	Ivory Coast	11.27	2
8	Mujinga Kambundji	Switzerland	11.41	1

Women's 800m
Place	Athlete	Country	Time	Points
1st place, gold medalist(s)	Mary Moraa	Kenya	1:57.43	8
2nd place, silver medalist(s)	Keely Hodgkinson	Great Britain	1:58.37	7
3rd place, bronze medalist(s)	Natoya Goule	Jamaica	1:58.90	6
4	Catriona Bisset	Australia	1:58.95	5
5	Jemma Reekie	Great Britain	1:59.32	4
6	Audrey Werro	Switzerland	1:59.71	3
7	Lore Hoffmann	Switzerland	2:00.49	2
8	Elena Bellò	Italy	2:00.76	1
9	Noélie Yarigo	Benin	2:04.93	
	Patrycja Wyciszkiewicz	Poland	DNF	

Women's 100mH (−1.4 m/s)
Place	Athlete	Country	Time	Points
1st place, gold medalist(s)	Jasmine Camacho-Quinn	Puerto Rico	12.40	8
2nd place, silver medalist(s)	Tobi Amusan	Nigeria	12.47	7
3rd place, bronze medalist(s)	Tia Jones	United States	12.51	6
4	Pia Skrzyszowska	Poland	12.81	5
5	Ditaji Kambundji	Switzerland	12.83	4
6	Nia Ali	United States	12.83	3
7	Nadine Visser	Netherlands	13.09	2
8	Alaysha Johnson	United States	14.36	1

Women's 400mH
Place	Athlete	Country	Time	Points
1st place, gold medalist(s)	Femke Bol	Netherlands	52.76	8
2nd place, silver medalist(s)	Viivi Lehikoinen	Finland	54.67	7
3rd place, bronze medalist(s)	Ayomide Folorunso	Italy	55.12	6
4	Jessie Knight	Great Britain	55.13	5
5	Anna Ryzhykova	Ukraine	55.41	4
6	Viktoriya Tkachuk	Ukraine	55.69	3
7	Lina Nielsen	Great Britain	56.62	2
8	Gianna Woodruff	Panama	56.68	1

Women's 3000mSC
Place	Athlete	Country	Time	Points
1st place, gold medalist(s)	Beatrice Chepkoech	Kenya	9:05.98	8
2nd place, silver medalist(s)	Sembo Almayew	Ethiopia	9:06.82	7
3rd place, bronze medalist(s)	Peruth Chemutai	Uganda	9:11.91	6
4	Zerfe Wondemagegn	Ethiopia	9:14.34	5
5	Lomi Muleta	Ethiopia	9:15.35	4
6	Maruša Mišmaš-Zrimšek	Slovenia	9:19.20	3
7	Marwa Bouzayani	Tunisia	9:19.87	2
8	Lea Meyer	Germany	9:20.36	1
9	Alice Finot	France	9:26.55	
10	Aimee Pratt	Great Britain	9:28.00	
11	Mekides Abebe	Ethiopia	9:31.14	
12	Tatiane Raquel da Silva	Brazil	9:43.09	
13	Adva Cohen	Israel	9:46.04	
	Fancy Cherono	Kenya	DNF	

Women's Pole Vault
Place	Athlete	Country	Mark	Points
1st place, gold medalist(s)	Katie Moon	United States	4.82 m	8
2nd place, silver medalist(s)	Wilma Murto	Finland	4.77 m	7
3rd place, bronze medalist(s)	Eliza McCartney	New Zealand	4.71 m	6
4	Tina Šutej	Slovenia	4.61 m	5
5	Margot Chevrier	France	4.51 m	4
6	Holly Bradshaw	Great Britain	4.51 m	3
7	Nina Kennedy	Australia	4.51 m	2
8	Angelica Moser	Switzerland	4.51 m	1
9	Katerina Stefanidi	Greece	4.51 m	
10	Roberta Bruni	Italy	4.51 m	
11	Alysha Newman	Canada	4.41 m	

Women's Javelin Throw
Place	Athlete	Country	Mark	Points
1st place, gold medalist(s)	Mackenzie Little	Australia	65.70 m	8
2nd place, silver medalist(s)	Haruka Kitaguchi	Japan	63.34 m	7
3rd place, bronze medalist(s)	Līna Mūze	Latvia	62.58 m	6
4	Adriana Vilagoš	Serbia	61.87 m	5
5	Victoria Hudson	Austria	61.24 m	4
6	Kelsey-Lee Barber	Australia	60.34 m	3
7	Liveta Jasiūnaitė	Lithuania	60.07 m	2
8	Sigrid Borge	Norway	59.20 m	1
9	Elina Tzengko	Greece	57.71 m	
10	Ariana Ince	United States	56.72 m	
11	Yulenmis Aguilar	Cuba	55.73 m	

=== Promotional events ===
Men's 400m
Place	Athlete	Country	Time
1st place, gold medalist(s)	Leungo Scotch	Botswana	44.94
2nd place, silver medalist(s)	Dylan Borlée	Belgium	45.86
3rd place, bronze medalist(s)	Lionel Spitz	Switzerland	45.92
4	Davide Re	Italy	45.95
5	Liemarvin Bonevacia	Netherlands	46.29
6	Ricky Petrucciani	Switzerland	46.38
7	Thomas Jordier	France	46.77
8	Charles Devantay	Switzerland	46.77

Women's 4 × 100 m
Place	Athlete	Country	Time
1st place, gold medalist(s)	Murielle Ahouré-Demps; Marie-Josée Ta Lou; Jessika Gbai; Maboundou Koné	Ivory Coast	42.23
2nd place, silver medalist(s)	N'Ketia Seedo; Marije van Hunenstijn; Zoë Sedney; Tasa Jiya	Netherlands	43.18
3rd place, bronze medalist(s)	Lena Weiss; Salomé Kora; Sarah Atcho; Céline Bürgi	Switzerland	43.35
4	Astrid Glenner-Frandsen; Mette Graversgaard; Emma Beiter Bomme; Merel Kramer	Denmark	44.14
5	Nathacha Kouni; Meret Annabelle Baumgartner; Léonie Pointet; Mélissa Gutschmidt	Switzerland	44.30
6	Lorène Bazolo; Arialis Gandulla; Íris Silva; Rita Santos	Portugal	44.54
	Hana Basic; Mia Gross; Jessie Andrew; Torrie Lewis	Australia	DNF
	Karin Strametz; Susanne Gogl-Walli; Isabel Posch; Magdalena Lindner	Austria	DNF

=== National events ===
Men's 100m (−0.8 m/s)
Place	Athlete	Country	Time
1st place, gold medalist(s)	Pascal Mancini	Switzerland	10.52
2nd place, silver medalist(s)	Felix Svensson	Switzerland	10.60
3rd place, bronze medalist(s)	Alexis Hirsiger	Switzerland	10.73
4	Joël Csontos	Switzerland	10.74
5	Joshua Eichenberger	Switzerland	10.74
6	Lucien Kern	Switzerland	10.88
7	Alan Pichonnaz	Switzerland	10.94
8	Marc Perrin	France	10.95

Men's 800m
Place	Athlete	Country	Time
1st place, gold medalist(s)	Musa Sulimann	Sudan	1:48.91
2nd place, silver medalist(s)	Navid Kerber	Switzerland	1:49.73
3rd place, bronze medalist(s)	Ivan Pelizza	Switzerland	1:49.77
4	Filippo Moggi	Switzerland	1:49.82
5	Louis Low-Beer	Switzerland	1:49.98
6	Pascal Furtwängler	Switzerland	1:50.16
7	Vincent Notz	Switzerland	1:50.42
8	Lorenz Herrmann	Germany	1:50.42
9	Sven Keusch	Switzerland	1:50.69
	Khalid Benmahdi	Algeria	DNF

Women's 100m
Place	Athlete	Country	Time	Heat
1st place, gold medalist(s)	Maboundou Koné	Ivory Coast	11.30	1
2nd place, silver medalist(s)	Arialis Gandulla	Portugal	11.36	1
3rd place, bronze medalist(s)	Marije van Hunenstijn	Netherlands	11.37	2
4	Jessika Gbai	Ivory Coast	11.38	1
5	Jamile Samuel	Netherlands	11.41	2
6	Lorène Bazolo	Portugal	11.44	1
7	Mélissa Gutschmidt	Switzerland	11.45	1
8	N'Ketia Seedo	Netherlands	11.45	1
9	Rosalina Santos	Portugal	11.52	1
10	Nathacha Kouni	Switzerland	11.55	1
11	Lena Weiss	Switzerland	11.57	2
12	Emma van Camp	Switzerland	11.58	2
13	Mia Gross	Australia	11.63	3
14	Chloé Rabac	Switzerland	11.74	2
15	Soraya Becerra	Switzerland	11.76	3
16	Emma Beiter Bomme	Denmark	11.78	3
17	Mathilde Kramer	Denmark	11.80	3
18	Karel Elodie Ziketh	Ivory Coast	11.82	2
19	Astrid Glenner-Frandsen	Denmark	11.86	3
20	Meret Annabelle Baumgartner	Switzerland	11.95	3
21	Beatriz Andrade	Portugal	11.96	3
22	Hana Basic	Australia	11.99	2

Women's 200m (−0.4 m/s)
Place	Athlete	Country	Time
1st place, gold medalist(s)	Tasa Jiya	Netherlands	23.16
2nd place, silver medalist(s)	Alexandra Burghardt	Germany	23.43
3rd place, bronze medalist(s)	Sarah Atcho	Switzerland	23.53
4	Mette Graversgaard	Denmark	23.56
5	Léonie Pointet	Switzerland	23.58
6	Zoë Sedney	Netherlands	23.60
7	Céline Bürgi	Switzerland	23.60
8	Iris Caligiuri	Switzerland	24.38

Women's 400m
Place	Athlete	Country	Time
1st place, gold medalist(s)	Rachel Pellaud	Switzerland	53.11
2nd place, silver medalist(s)	Noémie Salamin	Switzerland	53.46
3rd place, bronze medalist(s)	Catia Gubelmann	Switzerland	53.61
4	Karin Disch	Switzerland	54.50
5	Sarah King	Switzerland	54.50
6	Michelle Liem	Switzerland	54.58
7	Seraina Lerf	Switzerland	55.43
8	Sophie Martin	Switzerland	56.25

=== U18 events ===
Men's 1500m
Place	Athlete	Country	Time
1st place, gold medalist(s)	Yanis Payraudeau	Switzerland	4:06.55
2nd place, silver medalist(s)	Petter Oster	Switzerland	4:06.93

Women's 1500m
Place	Athlete	Country	Time
1st place, gold medalist(s)	Anina Hirzel	Switzerland	4:41.67
2nd place, silver medalist(s)	Amaja Rahm	Switzerland	4:42.66
3rd place, bronze medalist(s)	Flurina Köthe	Switzerland	4:45.58
4	Rawa Kaya Iseli	Switzerland	4:48.85
5	Sophia Ritler Nele	Switzerland	4:52.48
6	Sarina Berner	Switzerland	4:52.95
7	Seraina Kulli	Switzerland	4:55.79
8	Flurina Auf der Maur	Switzerland	5:03.31
9	Louise Emma Rohrbach	Switzerland	5:04.50
