= Urban trail de Lille =

Running event held in Lille, France

The Lille Urban Trail is a running event held in Lille, France.

== Events ==
At its first edition in 2018, the only race was the urban trail. This race was not timed and had no rankings. It consisted of an 8.34 km loop starting at Place de la République and passing through monuments and museums.

In 2019, a timed and ranked 5 km race was added to the event programme. The 2020 edition was cancelled due to the COVID-19 pandemic. From 2021 to 2026, the event included a 10 km race in addition to the urban trail and the 5 km race · · · · ·.

== Winners ==
The male and female winners of the timed races are listed below · · · · · ·:

=== 5 km race ===
Edition	Year	Men			Women		
		Rank	Athlete	Time	Rank	Athlete	Time
1st	2018	No 5 km race					
2nd	2019	1st	Robert Keter	13 min 22 s	34th	Mercy Jerop	16 min 21 s
-	2020	Edition cancelled due to the COVID-19 pandemic					
3rd	2021	1st	Berihu Aregawi	12 min 52 s	13th	Dawit Seyaum	14 min 39 s
4th	2022	1st	Michael Temoi	13 min 07 s	105th	Julie Voet	16 min 32 s
5th	2023	1st	Reynold Cheruiyot	13 min 21 s	20th	Wubrist Aschal	14 min 41 s
6th	2024	1st	Melkeneh Azize	13 min 15 s	27th	Nelvin Jepkemboi	14 min 48 s
7th	2025	1st	Clinton Kimutai Ngetich	13 min 20 s	76th	Celia Tabet	15 min 08 s
8th	2026	1st	Jimmy Gressier	12 min 51 s	49th	Maria Alemayo	14 min 15 s

=== 10 km race ===
Edition	Year	Men			Women		
		Rank	Athlete	Time	Rank	Athlete	Time
1st	2018	No 10 km race					
2nd	2019	No 10 km race					
-	2020	Edition cancelled due to the COVID-19 pandemic					
3rd	2021	1st	Debete Gudeta	27 min 14 s	23rd	Celliphine Chepsol	30 min 19 s
4th	2022	1st	Amos Bett	27 min 11 s	32nd	Judith Kiyeng	31 min 10 s
5th	2023	1st	Gemechu Dida	27 min 16 s	21st	Agnes Ngetich	29 min 26 s
6th	2024	1st	Étienne Daguinos	27 min 04 s	31st	Christine Chesiro	29 min 56 s
7th	2025	1st	John Lomoni Aimun	27 min 13 s	46th	Brenda Jepchirchir	30 min 04 s
8th	2026	1st	Khairi Bejega	26 min 51 s	62nd	Agnes Ngetich	28 min 58 s

== Notable records ==
- In 2019, Robert Keter broke the world 5 km record with a time of 13 min 22 s.
- In 2024, Étienne Daguinos broke the European 10 km record with a time of 27 min 04 s.
- In 2025, Jimmy Gressier broke the European 5 km record with a time of 12 min 57 s.
- In 2026, Jimmy Gressier broke the European 5 km record again with a time of 12 min 51 s, while Cassandre Beaugrand broke the French 10 km record with a time of 30 min 52 s.
