= 2023 World Athletics Cross Country Championships – U20 men's race =

U20 men's race at the 2023 World Athletics Cross Country Championships
- Organisers: World Athletics
- Edition: 44th
- Date: February 18, 2023
- Host city: Bathurst, New South Wales, Australia
- Events: 1
- Distances: 8 km – U20 men
- Participation: 70 athletes from 16 nations

The U20 men's race at the 2023 World Athletics Cross Country Championships was held at the Bathurst in Australia, on February 18, 2023. Ishmael Kipkurui from Kenya won the gold medal by 1 second over Kenyan Reynold Kipkorir Cheruiyot, while Boki Diriba finished third.

== Race results ==
=== U20 men's race (8 km) ===
==== Individual ====
Rank	Athlete	Country	Time
1st place, gold medalist(s)	Ishmael Kipkurui	Kenya	24:29
2nd place, silver medalist(s)	Reynold Kipkorir Cheruiyot	Kenya	24:30
3rd place, bronze medalist(s)	Boki Diriba	Ethiopia	23:31
4	Dan Kibet	Uganda	24:36
5	Bereket Zeleke	Ethiopia	24:51
6	Keneth Kiprop	Uganda	24:52
7	Abel Bekele	Ethiopia	24:52
8	Bereket Nega	Ethiopia	25:10
9	Dennis Mutuku	Kenya	25:13
10	Daniel Kinyanjui	Kenya	25:17
11	Hosea Chemutai	Uganda	25:24
12	Charles Rotich	Kenya	25:24
13	Kuma Girma	Ethiopia	25:24
14	Dennis Kipkurui	Kenya	25:38
15	Yismaw Dillu	Ethiopia	25:46
16	Emilio Young	United States	26:03
17	Archie Noakes	Australia	26:06
18	Edward Bird	United Kingdom	26:10
19	Marco Langon	United States	26:16
20	Jayde Rosslee	South Africa	26:22
21	Max Sannes	United States	26:24
22	Dino Nako	South Africa	26:35
23	Jaouad Khchina	Morocco	26:35
24	Daichi Shibata	Japan	26:39
25	Kole Mathison	United States	26:42
26	Jacob Deacon	United Kingdom	26:44
27	Micah Wilson	United States	26:50
28	Luke Birdseye	United Kingdom	26:52
29	Sergio Del Barrio	Spain	26:54
30	Zouhair Redouane	Morocco	26:55
31	Bailey Habler	Australia	26:59
32	Heath Mcallister	Canada	27:02
33	Pedro Marín	Colombia	27:02
34	Cael Mulholland	Australia	27:03
35	Kaisei Okada	Japan	27:05
36	Sibusiso Msibi	South Africa	27:07
37	Musawenkosi Mnisi	South Africa	27:09
38	Matt Hill	New Zealand	27:09
39	Elliott Pugh	New Zealand	27:14
40	Ciaran Rushton	Australia	27:19
41	Siyabonga Xowana	South Africa	27:24
42	Kaisei Yasuhara	Japan	27:28
43	Aleix Vives	Spain	27:30
44	Rubén Leonardo	Spain	27:32
45	Roberto Castro	Mexico	27:33
46	Moheddine Benchahyd	Morocco	27:33
47	Aitor Garcia	Spain	27:38
48	Sam Mills	United Kingdom	27:46
49	Jack Coomber	Australia	27:49
50	Mark Lopez	Mexico	27:50
51	Ronan Codyre	New Zealand	27:51
52	El Houssaine Hitrane	Morocco	27:51
53	Evan Jenkins	United States	28:00
54	Jack Lehto	Canada	28:08
55	Ricardo Amador	Mexico	28:36
56	Gaetano Pocchi	Canada	28:37
57	Tristan Coles	Canada	28:55
58	Jaxon Kuchar	Canada	29:01
59	Tanner Hueglin	Canada	29:30
60	Angus Monro	New Zealand	29:44
61	Hugh Kent	Guam	29:50
62	Taiga Tosen	Japan	30:21
63	Reatlegile Mosweu	South Africa	31:20
64	Koszta Deszecsar	Norfolk Island	40:12
	Logan Janetzki	Australia	DNF
	Sonata Nagashima	Japan	DNF
	Christian De Vaal	New Zealand	DNF
	Jamie Mora	New Zealand	DNF
	Hiroto Youshioka	Japan	DNF
	Oualid Abdel Moumen	Morocco	DNS

==== Team ====
Rank	Team	Score
1st place, gold medalist(s)	Kenya	22
2nd place, silver medalist(s)	Ethiopia	23
3rd place, bronze medalist(s)	United States	81
4	South Africa	115
5	United Kingdom	120
6	Australia	122
7	Morocco	151
8	Spain	163
9	Japan	163
10	New Zealand	188
11	Canada	199
