= 2024 World Athletics Cross Country Championships – Senior men's race =

Senior men's race at the 2024 World Athletics Cross Country Championships
- Organisers: World Athletics
- Edition: 45th
- Date: March 30, 2024
- Host city: Belgrade, Serbia
- Events: 1
- Distances: 10 km – Senior men
- Participation: 122 athletes from 42 nations

The Senior men's race at the 2024 World Athletics Cross Country Championships was held at Belgrade, Serbia, on March 30, 2024. Jacob Kiplimo from Uganda won the gold medal by 3 seconds over Ethiopia's Berihu Aregawi and Kenya's Benson Kiplangat, who finished third.

== Race results ==
=== Senior men's race (10 km) ===
==== Individual ====
Men's Cross Country Senior Race
Place	Athlete	Age	Country	Time
1st place, gold medalist(s)	Jacob Kiplimo	23	Uganda	28:09
2nd place, silver medalist(s)	Berihu Aregawi	23	Ethiopia	28:12
3rd place, bronze medalist(s)	Benson Kiplangat	20	Kenya	28:14
4	Nicholas Kimeli	25	Kenya	28:16
5	Samwel Chebolei Masai	23	Kenya	28:18
6	Joshua Cheptegei	27	Uganda	28:24
7	Sabastian Sawe	29	Kenya	28:31
8	Gideon Kipkertich Rono	21	Kenya	28:31
9	Thierry Ndikumwenayo	27	Spain	28:36
10	Boki Diriba	20	Ethiopia	28:38
11	Dan Kibet	20	Uganda	28:45
12	Tadese Worku	22	Ethiopia	28:50
13	Hosea Kiplangat	24	Uganda	28:50
14	Martin Kiprotich	20	Uganda	28:56
15	Abderezak Suleman	20	Eritrea	29:01
16	Chimdessa Debele	20	Ethiopia	29:05
17	Aarón Las Heras	23	Spain	29:08
18	Leonard Chemutai	20	Uganda	29:10
19	Berehanu Tsegu	24	Ethiopia	29:15
20	Mehdi Frère	27	France	29:16
21	Bennett Seloyi	23	South Africa	29:20
22	Anthony Rotich	33	United States	29:22
23	Haftu Strintzos	24	Australia	29:22
24	Edward Marks	22	Australia	29:22
25	Emmanuel Bor	35	United States	29:37
26	Getachew Masresha	23	Ethiopia	29:38
27	Will Barnicoat	21	Great Britain	29:39
28	Merhawi Mebrahtu	20	Eritrea	29:40
29	Liam Adams	37	Australia	29:43
30	Patrick Tiernan	29	Australia	29:45
31	Emile Hafashimana	19	Burundi	29:47
32	Awet Habte	26	Eritrea	29:50
33	Andries Sesedi	22	South Africa	29:50
34	Fernando Carro	31	Spain	29:51
35	Emmanuel Roudolff-Levisse	28	France	29:51
36	Ahmed Muhumed	26	United States	29:53
37	Christian Allen	26	United States	29:54
38	Brhane Negasi Gebrekrstos	19	Eritrea	29:57
39	Miguel Baidal	22	Spain	29:59
40	Nadeel Wildschutt	27	South Africa	30:04
41	Philippe Morneau-Cartier	22	Canada	30:04
42	Wellington Varevi	29	Zimbabwe	30:07
43	Gulveer Singh	25	India	30:07
44	Calum Johnson	29	Great Britain	30:07
45	Kartik Kumar	24	India	30:09
46	Andre Waring	30	Australia	30:10
47	Chris Mhlanga	22	South Africa	30:14
48	Hiroto Fujimagari	26	Japan	30:15
49	Tom Evans	32	Great Britain	30:16
50	Hugh Armstrong	29	Ireland	30:18
51	Zachary Facioni	24	Australia	30:20
52	Anthony Camerieri	24	United States	30:21
53	Rafael Loza	29	Ecuador	30:22
54	Célestin Ndikumana	22	Burundi	30:22
55	Ryūto Igawa	23	Japan	30:23
56	Keelan Kilrehill	23	Ireland	30:25
57	Andrew Davies	23	Canada	30:27
58	Reid Buchanan	31	United States	30:27
59	Filmon Kibrom	21	Eritrea	30:30
60	Félicien Muhitira	29	Rwanda	30:34
61	Nassim Hassaous	30	Spain	30:41
62	Mathews Leeto	33	South Africa	30:43
63	Thomas Fafard	25	Canada	30:44
64	William Little	24	New Zealand	30:44
65	Lionel Nihimbazwe	18	Burundi	30:48
66	Tomonori Yamaguchi	20	Japan	30:49
67	Max Turek	24	Canada	30:49
68	James Kingston	22	Great Britain	31:07
69	Julio Chacon	24	Peru	31:12
70	Iwo Balabanow	27	Bulgaria	31:16
71	Jean Marie Bukuru	21	Burundi	31:20
72	Aron Kifle	26	Eritrea	31:21
73	Patrick Nimubona	23	Burundi	31:22
74	Scott Stirling	30	Great Britain	31:25
75	Tomoya Ogikubo	26	Japan	31:28
76	Ulises Martin	30	Peru	31:44
77	César Gómez	22	Mexico	31:47
78	Therence Bizoza	20	Burundi	32:00
79	Emmanuel Reyes	26	Mexico	32:01
80	Mike Tate	28	Canada	32:24
81	Winer Canchanya	25	Peru	32:27
82	Islam Amangos	28	Kazakhstan	32:40
83	Chun Yin Tse	22	Hong Kong	33:22
84	Walter Nina	30	Peru	33:27
85	Munir Kabbara	24	Lebanon	33:35
86	Chun Khai Jon Lim	22	Singapore	33:41
87	Shaun Goh	27	Singapore	33:48
88	Hemraj Gurjar	24	India	33:56
89	See Yeung Chong	23	Hong Kong	33:58
90	Miguel Barzola	41	Argentina	34:10
91	Deniss Šalkauskas	25	Estonia	34:45
92	Ethan Yan	23	Singapore	34:56
93	Iván Zarco	40	Honduras	35:01
94	Yannick Magnan	27	Seychelles	35:09
95	Ming Wei Marcus Ong	38	Singapore	35:41
96	Tony Hanna	39	Lebanon	36:01
97	Alexander Marusich	19	Kazakhstan	36:02
98	Željko Dabović	27	Montenegro	36:18
99	Samat Kazakbayev	26	Kyrgyzstan	37:20
100	Evueli Toia	21	Fiji	38:25
101	Zoubaïrou Afiz	23	Central African Republic	38:46
102	Peni Bulikiobo	17	Fiji	40:56
103	Meng Tak Leong	24	Macau	41:06
104	Pramesh Prasad	49	Fiji	41:37
105	Vishant Reddy	19	Fiji	42:23
106	Jeremiah Singh	33	Fiji	42:59
107	Rupeni Mataitoga	32	Cook Islands	48:30
	Connor Black	28	Canada	DNF
	Michael Gras	32	France	DNF
	Ishmael Kipkurui	19	Kenya	DNF
	Kabelo Mulaudzi	26	South Africa	DNF
	Mohammad Karim Yaqoot	34	Afghanistan	DNS
	Alex Kabambale Paluku	23	DR Congo	DNS
	Omar Abou Hamad	31	Lebanon	DNS
	Imad Jizzini	43	Lebanon	DNS
	Ali Alrida Kanaan	20	Lebanon	DNS
	Ali H. Mourtada	24	Lebanon	DNS
	Noel Hitimana	34	Rwanda	DNS
	Emmanuel Mutabazi	31	Rwanda	DNS
	Jean Claude Nsabimana	28	Rwanda	DNS
	Najmuddin Zuhurshohi	22	Tajikistan	DNS

==== Team ====
Rank	Team	Score
1st place, gold medalist(s)	Kenya	19
2nd place, silver medalist(s)	Uganda	31
3rd place, bronze medalist(s)	Ethiopia	40
4	Spain	99
5	Australia	106
6	Eritrea	113
7	United States	120
8	South Africa	141
9	United Kingdom	188
10	Burundi	221
11	Canada	228
12	Japan	244
13	Peru	310
14	Singapore	360
15	Fiji	411
