= 2022 African Championships in Athletics – Men's 10,000 metres =

The men's 10,000 metres event at the 2022 African Championships in Athletics was held on 8 June in Port Louis, Mauritius.

== Results ==
Rank	Athlete	Nationality	Time	Notes
1st place, gold medalist(s)	Mogos Tuemay	Ethiopia	29:19.01	
2nd place, silver medalist(s)	Chimdessa Debele	Ethiopia	29:22.74	
3rd place, bronze medalist(s)	Abraham Longosiwa	Kenya	29:23.02	
4	Julius Kipkwony	Kenya	29:24.41	
5	Mulat Bazezew	Ethiopia	29:34.51	
6	Yves Nimubona	Rwanda	29:39.44	
7	Mbuleli Mathanga	South Africa	29:40.86	
8	Elroy Gelant	South Africa	29:41.40	
9	Djamal Abdi Dirieh	Djibouti	29:42.69	
10	Moumin Bouh Guelleh	Djibouti	29:57.43	
11	Ali Chebures	Uganda	30:27.66	
12	Tebello Ramakongoana	Lesotho	30:47.40	
	Alex Kambale	Democratic Republic of the Congo	DNS	
	François Musafiri	Democratic Republic of the Congo	DNS	
	Toka Badboy	Lesotho	DNS	
	Mohamed Fares	Morocco	DNS	
	Yousif Musa	Sudan	DNS	
	Joseph Panga	Tanzania	DNS	
