= 2023 World Athletics Championships – Men's 5000 metres =

Men's 5000 metres at the 2023 World Championships
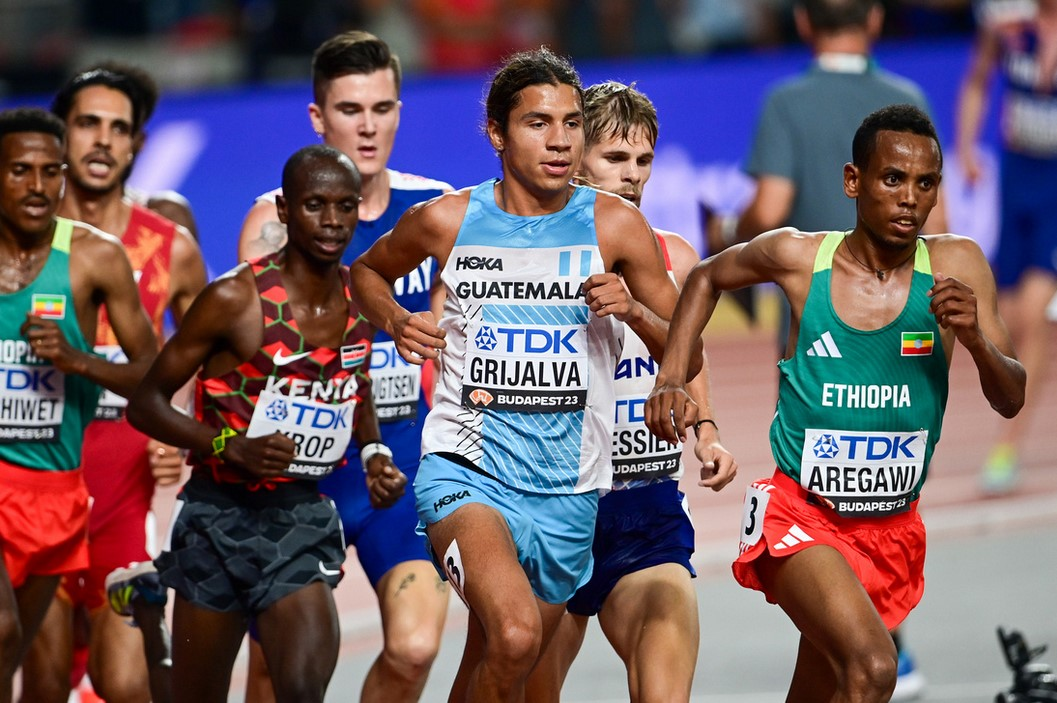
- Final of the event
- Venue: National Athletics Centre
- Dates: 24 August (heats); 27 August (final)
- Competitors: 44 from 24 nations
- Winning time: 13:11.30

Medalists
gold medal	Jakob Ingebrigtsen	Norway
silver medal	Mohamed Katir	Spain
bronze medal	Jacob Krop	Kenya

The men's 5000 metres at the 2023 World Athletics Championships was held at the National Athletics Centre in Budapest on 24 and 27 August 2023. Norwegian Jakob Ingebrigtsen won the gold medal, followed by Mohamed Katir and Jacob Krop.

== Summary ==
There was a little drama in the opening heats. World record holder Joshua Cheptegei did not run. In the first heat, Sam Parsons tripped. As he went down, Stewie McSweyn tripped over him and was taken out of contention. Referees awarded McSweyn a place in the final.

Seventeen athletes toed the line. After sorting things out for two laps at 68 seconds per lap pace, Ishmael Rokitto Kipkurui threw in a 62 and nobody went with him. They let him have his day in the sun for 4 laps, then the peloton reeled him in. A leading pack mostly led by Berihu Aregawi then picked up the pace, 65, 62, 63, but the pack stayed as a group, very few were dropping off the pace. Three laps to go, it was time to race. While the Ethiopians Aregawi and Hagos Gebrhiwet were driving the pace, Luis Grijalva, Mohamed Ismail and Jimmy Gressier were always lurking on the front of the pack, defending champion Jakob Ingebrigtsen and Mohamed Katir, both of whom had competed in the 1500, were towards the back. Both felt they had something to prove. Ingebrigtsen was upset he had only won a silver medal in the 1500, losing gold to a Scottsman, this time Josh Kerr, for the second championships in a row. Katir, a bronze medalist from 2022, was upset he did not even make the 1500 final. With 3 laps to go Katir, followed by Ingebrigtsen, drifted towards the front. This move also brought the attention of Jacob Krop, Yomif Kejelcha and Mohammed Ahmed. The next 62 second lap strung out the back of the pack while there was a crowd near the front. The next lap at 58 pace congealed to 9. Coming in to the bell, there was a scramble. Seeing an opening one the inside as Aregawi drifted out, Gressier tried to sneak by on the inside. Aregawi closed the door and Gressier drifted back. Gebrhiwet, riding Aregawi's shoulder, was the reason he drifted out in the first place. When one door closed, it opened another for Gebrhiwet who pounced into the lead at the bell. Through the turn, Katir followed Gebrhiwet. Onto the backstretch, Katir used his 1500 speed to move to the lead, opening up 2 metres. Behind him, Ingebrigtsen had been boxed to the inside by Kejelcha. Ingebrigtsen had to drift out to lane 3 with Kejelcha still to his outside. Then he had to outrun Aregawi to get running room. Through the final turn Ingebrigtsen got around Gebrhiwet, the last of the three Ethiopians, spending considerable effort. Coming off the turn, he looked back to see if they were still mounting a challenge, no problem there, then he took off after Katir quickly getting to within a metre. But Ingebrigtsen was not making any more progress. Halfway down the straightaway it was as if he thought to himself, "I could just run in to get a Silver medal. No, I'm here to get Gold." He made one more push, slowly getting past Katir. Having given all he could to the effort, he even leaned for the line to make sure. It was not easy, but Ingebrigtsen had defended the title. 10 metres in back of the duo, the rest of the large pack were still battling the three Ethiopians. Six runners, four lanes wide halfway down the home stretch, Grijalva, Ahmed and Krop were racing for bronze. Sprinting down lane 3, from seventh place with 200 to go, Krop emerged in front to take the third medal.

== Records ==
Before the competition records were as follows:

Record	Athlete & Nat.	Perf.	Location	Date
World record	Joshua Cheptegei (UGA)	12:35.36	Fontvieille, Monaco	14 August 2020
Championship record	Eliud Kipchoge (KEN)	12:52.79	Saint-Denis, France	31 August 2003
World Leading	Berihu Aregawi (ETH)	12:40.45	Lausanne, Switzerland	30 June 2023
African Record	Joshua Cheptegei (UGA)	12:35.36	Fontvieille, Monaco	14 August 2020
Asian Record	Albert Rop (BHR)	12:51.96	Fontvieille, Monaco	19 July 2013
European Record	Mohamed Katir (ESP)	12:45.01	Fontvieille, Monaco	21 July 2023
North, Central American and Caribbean record	Grant Fisher (USA)	12:46.96	Brussels, Belgium	2 September 2022
Oceanian record	Craig Mottram (AUS)	12:55.76	London, United Kingdom	30 July 2004
South American Record	Federico Bruno (ARG)	13:11.57	Palo Alto, United States	21 April 2023

== Qualification standard ==
The standard to qualify automatically for entry was 13:07.00.

== Schedule ==
The event schedule, in local time (UTC+2), was as follows:

Date	Time	Round
24 August	19:00	Heats
27 August	20:20	Final

== Results ==
=== Heats ===
The first 8 athletes in each heat (Q) qualified for the final. The overall results were as follows:

Rank	Heat	Name	Nationality	Time	Notes
1	2	Luis Grijalva	Guatemala	13:32.72	Q
2	2	Yomif Kejelcha	Ethiopia	13:32.83	Q
3	2	Mohammed Ahmed	Canada	13:33.16	Q
4	2	Berihu Aregawi	Ethiopia	13:33.23	Q
5	2	Oscar Chelimo	Uganda	13:33.40	Q, SB
6	2	Mohamed Ismail	Djibouti	13:33.51	Q
7	2	Ishmael Rokitto Kipkurui	Kenya	13:33.63	Q
7	2	Jacob Krop	Kenya	13:33.63	Q
9	2	Thierry Ndikumwenayo	Spain	13:34.03	
10	2	Rodrigue Kwizera	Burundi	13:35.81	
11	1	Mohamed Katir	Spain	13:35.90	Q
12	1	Hagos Gebrhiwet	Ethiopia	13:36.15	Q
13	1	Jakob Ingebrigtsen	Norway	13:36.21	Q, SB
14	1	Ouassim Oumaiz	Spain	13:36.35	Q
15	2	Magnus Tuv Myhre	Norway	13:36.36	
16	1	Abdihamid Nur	United States	13:36.37	Q
17	1	Jimmy Gressier	France	13:36.42	Q
18	1	Paul Chelimo	United States	13:36.51	Q
19	1	Narve Gilje Nordås	Norway	13:36.55	Q
20	1	Andreas Almgren	Sweden	13:36.57	
21	1	Egide Ntakarutimana	Burundi	13:37.53	
22	2	Jonas Raess	Switzerland	13:37.84	
23	1	Ben Flanagan	Canada	13:38.69	
24	2	Henrik Ingebrigtsen	Norway	13:38.80	
25	1	Mike Foppen	Netherlands	13:38.94	
26	1	John Heymans	Belgium	13:39.67	
27	2	Hugo Hay	France	13:39.76	
28	2	Sean McGorty	United States	13:40.28	
29	1	Nicholas Kimeli	Kenya	13:40.43	
30	1	Birhanu Balew	Bahrain	13:41.00	
31	1	Brian Fay	Ireland	13:42.86	
32	2	Morgan McDonald	Australia	13:43.58	
33	1	Cornelius Kemboi	Kenya	13:44.32	
34	2	Hyuga Endo	Japan	13:50.49	
35	1	Kazuya Shiojiri	Japan	13:51.00	
36	2	Emil Danielsson	Sweden	13:54.35	
37	2	Robin Hendrix	Belgium	13:55.81	
38	1	Stewart McSweyn	Australia	13:56.81	qR
39	1	Sam Parsons	Germany	14:03.14	
40	2	Samuel Freire	Cape Verde	14:03.14	PB
41	2	Ferenc Soma Kovács	Hungary	14:11.99	SB
42	2	Mohamed Hrezi	Libya	14:14.72	SB
43	1	Valentín Soca	Uruguay	14:16.15	
	1	Joshua Cheptegei	Uganda	DNS	

=== Final ===
The final was started on 27 August at 20:20.

Rank	Name	Nationality	Time	Notes
1st place, gold medalist(s)	Jakob Ingebrigtsen	Norway	13:11.30	SB
2nd place, silver medalist(s)	Mohamed Katir	Spain	13:11.44	
3rd place, bronze medalist(s)	Jacob Krop	Kenya	13:12.28	
4	Luis Grijalva	Guatemala	13:12.50	
5	Yomif Kejelcha	Ethiopia	13:12.51	
6	Hagos Gebrhiwet	Ethiopia	13:12.65	
7	Mohammed Ahmed	Canada	13:12.92	
8	Berihu Aregawi	Ethiopia	13:12.99	
9	Jimmy Gressier	France	13:17.20	
10	Ishmael Kipkurui	Kenya	13:21.20	
11	Mohamed Ismail	Djibouti	13:23.89	
12	Abdihamid Nur	United States	13:23.90	
13	Stewart McSweyn	Australia	13:26.58	
14	Narve Gilje Nordås	Norway	13:28.73	
15	Paul Chelimo	United States	13:30.88	
16	Ouassim Oumaiz	Spain	13:31.99	
	Oscar Chelimo	Uganda	DNF	
