= 2022 World Athletics Indoor Championships – Men's 3000 metres =

Men's 3000 metres at the 2022 World Athletics Indoor Championships
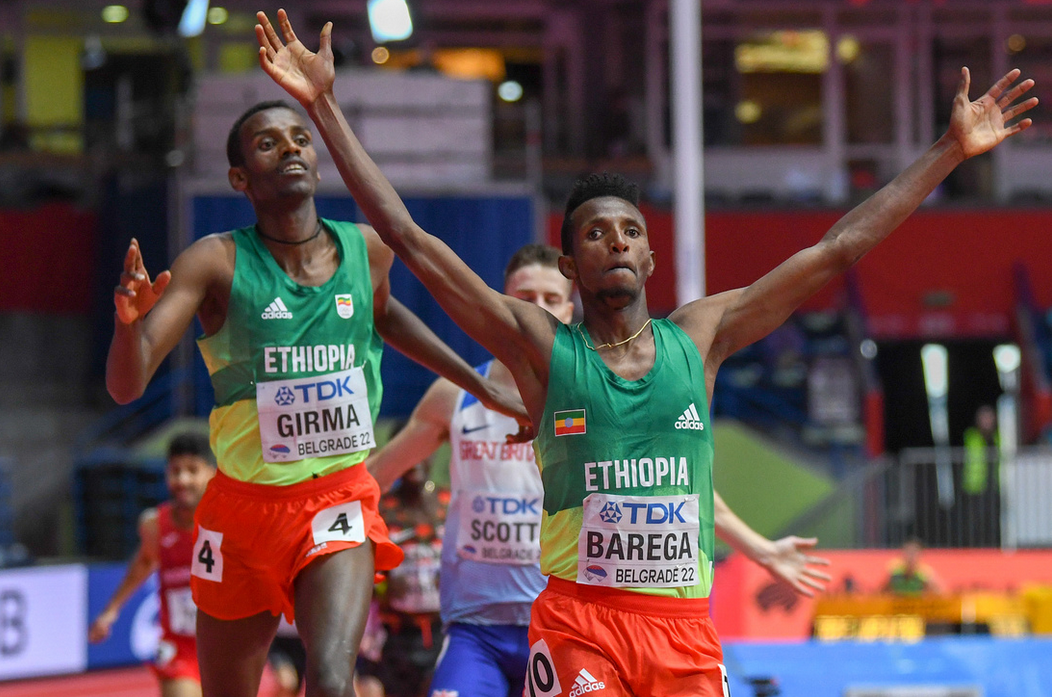
- Selemon Barega celebrating shortly after winning the final.
- Venue: Štark Arena
- Dates: 18, 20 March
- Competitors: 34 from 25 nations
- Winning time: 7:41.38

Medalists
gold medal	Selemon Barega	Ethiopia
silver medal	Lamecha Girma	Ethiopia
bronze medal	Marc Scott	Great Britain

The men's 3000 metres at the 2022 World Athletics Indoor Championships took place on 18 and 20 March 2022.

== Results ==
=== Heats ===
Qualification: First 4 in each heat (Q) and the next 3 fastest (q) advance to the Final

The heats were started on 18 March at 13:25.

Rank	Heat	Name	Nationality	Time	Notes
1	1	Lamecha Girma	Ethiopia	7:46.21	Q
2	1	Jacob Krop	Kenya	7:46.43	Q
3	1	Zouhair Talbi	Morocco	7:48.03	Q
4	1	Dillon Maggard	United States	7:48.58	Q
5	1	Jonas Raess	Switzerland	7:49.31	q
6	1	Baldvin Magnússon	Iceland	7:49.34	q
7	2	Selemon Barega	Ethiopia	7:51.42	Q
8	2	George Beamish	New Zealand	7:51.71	Q
9	1	Michael Somers	Belgium	7:51.89	q
10	2	Matthew Ramsden	Australia	7:52.04	Q, SB
11	2	Adel Mechaal	Spain	7:52.27	Q
12	2	Hicham Akankam	Morocco	7:52.38	
13	2	Elzan Bibić	Serbia	7:52.78	
14	3	Marc Scott	Great Britain	7:54.90	Q
15	3	Daniel Ebenyo	Kenya	7:54.97	Q
16	3	Isaac Kimeli	Belgium	7:55.75	Q
17	2	Sam Parsons	Germany	7:55.97	
18	3	Maximilian Thorwirth	Germany	7:56.20	Q
19	2	Tim Verbaandert	Netherlands	7:56.61	
20	3	Ossama Meslek	Italy	7:57.24	
21	1	John Gay	Canada	7:57.56	
22	2	Ahmed Jaziri	Tunisia	7:58.44	
23	3	Berihu Aregawi	Ethiopia	7:58.59	
24	2	Yassin Bouih	Italy	7:58.63	
25	1	Nursultan Keneshbekov	Kyrgyzstan	7:59.39	
26	1	Joel Ibler Lillesø	Denmark	8:00.07	
27	2	Ehab El-Sandali	Canada	8:00.64	
28	3	Jordan Gusman	Malta	8:02.13	
29	3	Mohamad Al-Garni	Qatar	8:02.86	
30	3	Darragh McElhinney	Ireland	8:06.31	
31	3	Adriaan Wildschutt	South Africa	8:09.24	
32	1	Jamaine Coleman	Great Britain	8:12.76	
33	3	Fernando Martínez	Mexico	8:15.58	
	2	Ali Moussa Barak	Chad	DNF	

=== Final ===
The final was started on 20 March at 12:10.

Rank	Name	Nationality	Time	Notes
1st place, gold medalist(s)	Selemon Barega	Ethiopia	7:41.38	
2nd place, silver medalist(s)	Lamecha Girma	Ethiopia	7:41.63	
3rd place, bronze medalist(s)	Marc Scott	Great Britain	7:42.02	SB
4	Daniel Ebenyo	Kenya	7:42.97	
5	Jacob Krop	Kenya	7:43.26	
6	Zouhair Talbi	Morocco	7:43.45	
7	Adel Mechaal	Spain	7:43.60	
8	Maximilian Thorwirth	Germany	7:45.87	
9	Dillon Maggard	United States	7:46.18	PB
10	George Beamish	New Zealand	7:46.91	
11	Jonas Raess	Switzerland	7:47.28	
12	Matthew Ramsden	Australia	7:49.82	SB
13	Michael Somers	Belgium	7:51.65	
14	Baldvin Magnússon	Iceland	8:04.77	
	Isaac Kimeli	Belgium	DNS	
