= Marco Langon =

American long-distance runner (born 2004)

Personal information
- Born: 31 August 2004 (age 22)

Sport
- Country: US
- Sport: Athletics
- Events: Middle-distance running, Long-distance running, Cross Country running

Achievements and titles
- Personal bests: 1500m: 3:32.79 (Azusa, 2026); Mile: 3:54.59 (Cork, 2025); 3000m: 7:34.00 (Boston, 2026); 5000m: 13:05.21 (Boston, 2025)
Medal record
Men's athletics
Representing the United States
World Cross Country Championships
Bronze medal – third place	2023 Bathurst	Junior team

Marco Langon (born 31 August 2004) is an American middle long-distance, and cross country runner. Competing as part of the junior team, he won a bronze medal at the 2023 World Athletics Cross Country Championships.

== Early life ==
From New Jersey, he attended Bridgewater-Raritan. In October 2021, he ran a cross country course record at the Skyland Conference Championships at Phillipsburg. He was mentored as a youngster by athletics coach Rob DeFillipis.

== Career ==
Langon was selected for the American U20 Cross Country team to compete in the 2023 World Athletics Cross Country Championships U20 men's race in Bathurst, New South Wales, on February 18, 2023. Langon finished 19th in the championship, the second-fastest American after Leo Young, helping the US team to a bronze medal finish with a total of 81 points.

Competing for Villanova University, on 27 March 2025, Langon set a new personal best with 3:33.38 for the 1500 metres at the Raleigh Relays, which moved him to second on the all-time list in the NCAA. The following month, he signed a name, image and likeness (NIL) contract with Diadora. He placed third behind Brian Musau and Habtom Samuel on the closing straight of the 5000 metres at the 2025 NCAA Division I Outdoor Track and Field Championships in Eugene, Oregon, in June 2025, in 13:21.17 with less than a second between all three at the finish. In July, he ran a personal best in the mile run of 3:54.59 whilst racing in Cork, Ireland.

Langon ran a 5000 metres personal best of 13:05.21 on 6 December 2025 in Boston, Massachusetts, finishing alongside Habtom Samuel, who was credited with the win by thousandths of a second. At the New Balance Indoor Grand Prix on 24 January 2026 in Boston, Langon ran an indoors 3000 metres personal best of 7:34.56 to move to fourth on the all-time collegiate performer list. He lowered that mark to 7:34.00 on 13 February in Boston at the BU Valentine Classic. He placed second in 13:36.98 in the 5000m behind Habtom Samuel on 13 March at the 2026 NCAA Indoor Championships, having run the fastest last lap in the field moving from fourth into second. The following day, he was credited with a third place finish in the 3000m final after a controversial race that saw Samuel, first across the line, disqualified post-race. In April 2026, he anchored Villanova to a win in the 4 x 1600 metres relay at the Penn Relays, running a split of 3:55.94. In May at the Franson Last Chance Meet, Langon moved to second on the NCAA all-time list behind Oregon's Simeon Birnbaum for the 1500 metres, winning in 3:32.79 after running 55.60 for the final lap. That month, he won the Big East 1500 metres final by almost four seconds in 3:39.68. Competing at the NCAA East Regional in Lexington, Kentucky on 29 May, he ran 13:27.93 to win the 5000 metres ahead of Rocky Hansen. On 12 June at the 2026 NCAA Outdoor Championships, he took the lead just prior to the final lap before placing fourth overall in the 5000 metres in Eugene. Shortly afterwards, he announced he would forego his remaining college eligibility to race professionally with Diadora. Langon won the Fifth Avenue Mile in New York in 3:45, a second ahead of British runner Jake Heyward, on 13 September.
