= 2025 World Athletics Indoor Championships – Men's 3000 metres =

Men's 3000 metres at the 2025 World Athletics Indoor Championships
- Venue: Nanjing's Cube at Nanjing Youth Olympic Sports Park
- Location: Nanjing, China
- Dates: 22 March
- Competitors: 14 from 10 nations
- Winning time: 7:46.09

Medalists
gold medal	Jakob Ingebrigtsen	Norway
silver medal	Berihu Aregawi	Ethiopia
bronze medal	Ky Robinson	Australia

The men's 3000 metres at the 2025 World Athletics Indoor Championships took place on the short track of the Nanjing's Cube at Nanjing Youth Olympic Sports Park in Nanjing, China, on 22 March 2025. It was the 21st time the event was contested at the World Athletics Indoor Championships. Athletes could qualify by achieving the entry standard or by their World Athletics Ranking in the event.

The final occurred on 22 March during the evening session.

== Background ==
The men's 3000 metres was contested 20 times before 2025, at every previous edition of the World Athletics Indoor Championships.

Records before the 2025 World Athletics Indoor Championships
Record	Athlete (nation)	Time (s)	Location	Date
World record	Grant Fisher (USA)	7:22.91	New York City, United States	8 February 2025
Championship record	Haile Gebrselassie (ETH)	7:34.71	Paris, France	9 March 1997
World leading	Grant Fisher (USA)	7:22.91	New York City, United States	8 February 2025

== Qualification ==
For the men's 3000 metres, the qualification period ran from 1 September 2024 until 9 March 2025. Athletes qualified achieving the entry standards of 7:31.00 s or 12:45.00 s in the 5000 metres. Athletes were also able to qualify by virtue of their World Athletics Ranking for the event, or by virtue of their World Athletics Indoor Tour wildcard. There was a target number of 15 athletes.

== Final ==
The final was started on 22 March, starting at 19:33 (UTC+8).

Place	Athlete	Nation	Time	Notes
1st place, gold medalist(s)	Jakob Ingebrigtsen	Norway	7:46.09	SB
2nd place, silver medalist(s)	Berihu Aregawi	Ethiopia	7:46.25	SB
3rd place, bronze medalist(s)	Ky Robinson	Australia	7:47.09	
4	Sam Gilman	United States	7:47.19	
5	Dylan Jacobs	United States	7:48.41	
6	Andrew Coscoran	Ireland	7:48.53	
7	Anass Essayi	Morocco	7:49.00	
8	Cornelius Kemboi	Kenya	7:49.00	PB
9	Biniam Mehary	Ethiopia	7:49.18	
10	Dawit Seare	Eritrea	7:49.49	
11	Getnet Wale	Ethiopia	7:50.07	
12	Sam Parsons	Germany	7:54.15	
13	James Gormley	Ireland	7:56.43	
14	Sun Ningkai	China	8:02.72	PB
