= Abdisa Fayisa =

Ethiopian long-distance runner (born 2005)

Personal information
- National team: Ethiopian
- Born: 24 April 2005 (age 21) Lemen, Oromia, Ethiopia

Sport
- Country: Ethiopia
- Sport: Athletics
- Events: Middle distance, long-distance running

Achievements and titles
- Personal bests: 1500m: 3:32.37 (Nerja, 2024); 3000m: 7:36.73 (Shanghai, 2026); 5000m: 13:13.66 (Lausanne, 2025)
Medal record
Men's athletics
Representing Ethiopia
World U20 Championships
Gold medal – first place	2024 Lima	1500m
Silver medal – second place	2024 Lima	5000m

Abdisa Fayisa Gutama (born 24 April 2005) is an Ethiopian middle and long-distance runner.

== Biography ==
In January 2023 at the age of 17, Fayisa won the men's 3000 meters indoor race in Karlsruhe in a time of 7:40.35.

He finished tenth at the 2024 World Athletics U20 Cross Country race in Belgrade in March 2024.

On 20 April 2024, he won the 5000 metres at the Kip Keino Classic in Nairobi in a personal best time of 13:34.77.

In June 2024, at the Ethiopian Olympic trials held in Nerja, Spain, Fayisa finished first in the men's 1500m in 3:32.37, meeting the Paris Olympics qualifying standards. He competed at the 2024 Summer Olympics over 1500 metres.

On 27 August 2024, he won silver at the 2024 World Athletics U20 Championships in the men's 5000 metres in Lima, Peru. A few days later, he won gold at the Championships in the 1500 metres.

He finished ninth over 5000 metres in the Diamond League at the 2025 Athletissima in wet conditions in Lausanne in a personal best 13:13.66. In July 2025, he was provisionally named as a reserve in the senior Ethiopian team for the 1500 metres at the 2025 World Athletics Championships in Tokyo, Japan.

In May 2026, he ran a personal best for the 3000 m of 7:36.73 at the 2026 Shanghai Diamond League.
