= Maximilian Thorwirth =

German long-distance runner

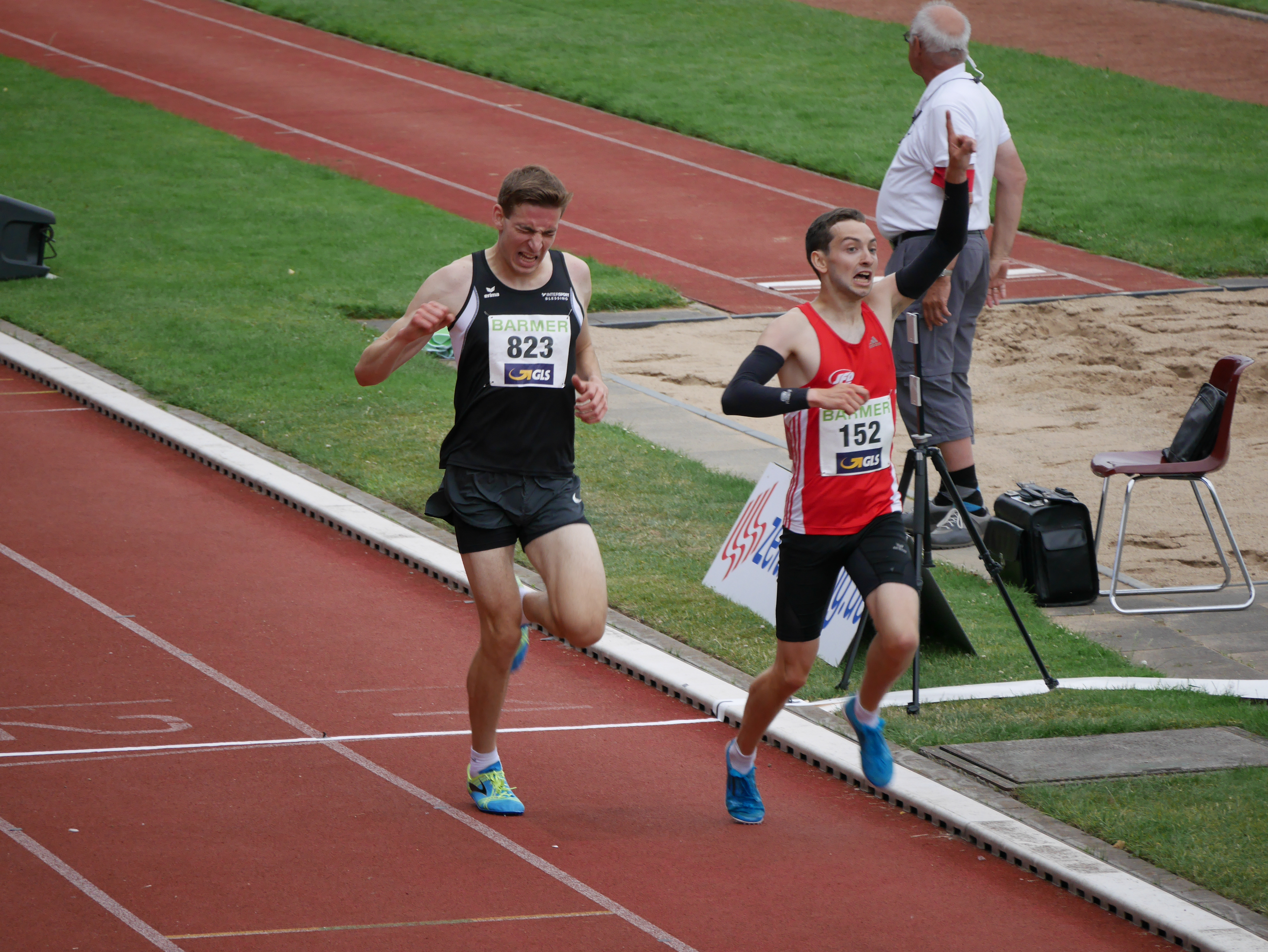
- Thorwirth (right) in 2017

Personal information
- Nationality: German
- Born: 9 January 1995 (age 31) Düsseldorf, Germany

Sport
- Country: Germany
- Sport: Track and Field
- Event(s): 1500m, 3000m, 5000m

Achievements and titles
- Personal bests: Outdoor; 800 m: 1:51.25 (Pfungstadt 2018); 1500 m: 3:37.61 (Karlsruhe 2022); 3000 m: 8:02.28 (Pliezhausen 2019); 5000 m: 13:22.66 (Oordegem 2022); Indoor; 1500 m: 3:38.72 (Erfurt 2022); 3000 m: 7:38.14 (New York 2022); Two miles: 8:17.78 (New York 2021)

Maximilian Thorwirth (born 9 January 1995) is a German long-distance runner. He competed in the 3000 metres at the 2022 World Athletics Indoor Championships.
