= Athletics at the 2014 Summer Youth Olympics – Boys' 3000 metres =

Athletics – Boys' 3000 metres at the II Summer Youth Olympic Games
- Venue: Nanjing Olympic Sports Centre
- Date: August 20–24
- Competitors: 16 from 16 nations

Medalists
1st place, gold medalist(s)		Yomif Kejelcha	Ethiopia
2nd place, silver medalist(s)		Thierry Ndikumwenayo	Burundi
3rd place, bronze medalist(s)		Moses Koech	Kenya

The boys’ 3000 m competition at the 2014 Summer Youth Olympics was held on 20–24 August 2014 in Nanjing Olympic Sports Center.

== Schedule ==
Date	Time	Round
20 August 2014	18:55	Heat
24 August 2014	20:30	Final

== Results ==
=== Heat ===
First 50% of the athletes from the Qualification round progress to the A Final and the remaining athletes to the B Final.

Rank	Lane	Athlete	Result	Notes	Q
1	16	Yomif Kejelcha (ETH)	8:05.85		FA
2	10	Moses Koech (KEN)	8:06.50		FA
3	1	Jordi Torrents (ESP)	8:13.89	PB	FA
4	5	Amine Zahaf (MAR)	8:14.51	PB	FA
5	7	Thierry Ndikumwenayo (BDI)	8:16.11	PB	FA
6	15	Mohamed Amine El Bouajaji (FRA)	8:16.43	PB	FA
7	11	Abdi Ibrahim Abdo (BRN)	8:16.86	PB	FA
8	2	Tawfiq Bouziane (ALG)	8:21.58	PB	FA
9	12	Jeremiah Ort (CAN)	8:23.76	PB	FB
10	4	Leo Chikhwaza (MAW)	8:30.40	PB	FB
11	9	Jean Marie Myasiro (RWA)	8:33.94	PB	FB
12	8	Titus Nyati (ZIM)	8:39.67	PB	FB
13	14	Kagiso Kebatshwaretse (BOT)	8:45.33	PB	FB
14	3	Adam Mohamed (SUD)	8:46.65	PB	FB
15	13	Mohamed Miftahou (COM)	9:00.01		FB
16	6	Camran Carbon (DMA)	9:46.78		FB

=== Finals ===
==== Final A ====
Rank	Final Placing	Lane	Athlete	Result	Notes
1st place, gold medalist(s)	1	1	Yomif Kejelcha (ETH)	7:56.20	
2nd place, silver medalist(s)	2	3	Thierry Ndikumwenayo (BDI)	8:06.05	PB
3rd place, bronze medalist(s)	3	7	Moses Koech (KEN)	8:06.33	
4	4	4	Abdi Ibrahim Abdo (BRN)	8:08.91	PB
5	5	5	Jordi Torrents (ESP)	8:09.99	PB
6	6	8	Tawfiq Bouziane (ALG)	8:18.98	PB
7	7	6	Amine Zahaf (MAR)	8:21.62	
		2	Mohamed Amine El Bouajaji (FRA)	DSQ	

==== Final B ====
Rank	Final Placing	Lane	Athlete	Result	Notes
1	8	3	Jeremiah Ort (CAN)	8:31.05	
2	9	6	Leo Chikhwaza (MAW)	8:32.07	
3	10	8	Jean Marie Myasiro (RWA)	8:32.44	PB
4	11	5	Adam Mohamed (SUD)	8:37.11	PB
5	12	4	Titus Nyati (ZIM)	8:37.82	PB
6	13	2	Kagiso Kebatshwaretse (BOT)	8:39.38	PB
7	14	7	Mohamed Miftahou (COM)	8:40.07	PB
		1	Camran Carbon (DMA)	DNS	
