= Boki Diriba =

Ethiopian athlete

Personal information
- Nationality: Ethiopian
- Born: 28 February 2004 (age 22)

Sport
- Sport: Athletics

Achievements and titles
- Personal best(s): 5000m: 14:06.7h (Assela, 2022); 10000m: 27:30.46 (Nerja, 2023); Half marathon 60:10 (Ras Al Khaimah, 2024)
Medal record
Marathon
Gold medal – first place	2026 Rabat	Men's Marathon
World Cross Country Championships
Bronze medal – third place	2024 Belgrade	Senior team
Bronze medal – third place	2023 Bathurst	U20 race
Silver medal – second place	2023 Bathurst	U20 Team

Boki Diriba (born 28 February 2004) is an Ethiopian cross country runner.

== Career ==
In January 2022, Diriba finished third at the Great Ethiopian Run. He became the Ethiopian U20 5000m champion in 2022 at the age of 18 years-old. In October 2022, he finished third at the Delhi half marathon in a time of 60:34.

In January 2023, he was runner up at the Jan Meda Cross Country U20 race in Sululta. He was a bronze medalist at the 2023 World Athletics Cross Country Championships U20 race in Bathurst.

In 2024, he won the Ethiopian world cross country trials, and was subsequently selected for the 2024 World Athletics Cross Country Championships in Serbia.

On 10 May 2026, Boki won the Rabat Marathon in Morocco, completing the 42.195 km course in 2 hours, 7 minutes and 52 seconds.
