= Bereket Nega =

Ethiopian athlete

Personal information
- Nationality: Ethiopian
- Born: Bereket Nega Batebo; 25 September 2004 (age 21)

Sport
- Sport: Athletics
- Events: Long-distance running, Cross country running

Achievements and titles
- Personal bests: 1500m: 3:43.00 (Addis Abada, 2021); 3000m: 7:52.45 (Valsugana, 2023); 5000m: 13:54.2 (Hawassa, 2022); Road; 5km: 13:33 (Lille, 2022); 10km: 27:49 (Herzogenaurach, 2025); Half marathon 1:00:03 (Buenos Aires, 2025)
Medal record
Men's athletics
Representing Ethiopia
World Road Running Championships
Silver medal – second place	2026 Copenhagen	Half marathon team
World Cross Country Championships
Gold medal – first place	2026 Tallahassee	Senior team
Silver medal – second place	2023 Bathurst	U20 Team

Bereket Nega Batebo (born 25 September 2004) is an Ethiopian long-distance and cross country runner.

== Biography ==
Nega placed eighth overall in the individual U20 race at the 2023 World Cross Country Championships in Bathurst, Australia, helping Ethiopia to win the team silver medal.

In 2025, Nega won the Jan Meda International Cross Country over 10 km, finishing ahead of Hailemariyam Amare in 28:29.00. He improved his 10 km personal best to 27:49 in 2025. Nega ran the half marathon distance in 1:00:03 in Buenos Aires in August 2025, placing fourth overall having run 27:59 through 10 km as pacemaker.

In November 2025, he defeated Berihu Aregawi at the Ethiopian World XC trials and was announced in the Ethiopian team for the 2026 World Athletics Cross Country Championships. On 10 January 2026 at the Championship in Tallahassee, he placed 35th overall.
