= Dominica at the 2014 Summer Youth Olympics =

- IOC code: DMA
- NOC: Dominica Olympic Committee

in Nanjing
- Competitors: 2 in 1 sport

Summer Youth Olympics appearances
- 2010; 2014; 2018

Dominica competed at the 2014 Summer Youth Olympics, in Nanjing, China from 16 August to 28 August 2014.

== Athletics ==
Dominica qualified two athletes.

Qualification Legend: Q=Final A (medal); qB=Final B (non-medal); qC=Final C (non-medal); qD=Final D (non-medal); qE=Final E (non-medal)

Boys
Track & road events

Athlete	Event	Heats		Final	
Athlete	Event	Result	Rank	Result	Rank
Camran Carbon	3000 m	9:46.78	16 qB	DNS	

Girls
Field events

Athlete	Event	Qualification		Final	
Athlete	Event	Distance	Position	Distance	Position
Shanee Angol	Javelin throw	43.25	15 qB	DNS	
