= 2024 World Athletics U20 Championships – Men's 5000 metres =

Men's 5000 metres at the 2024 World Athletics U20 Championships
- Venue: Estadio Atlético de la VIDENA
- Dates: 27 August 2024 (final)
- Competitors: 16 from 11 nations
- Winning time: 13:41.14

Medalists
gold medal	Andrew Alamisi	Kenya
silver medal	Abdisa Fayisa	Ethiopia
bronze medal	Keneth Kiprop	Uganda

The men's 5000 metres at the 2024 World Athletics U20 Championships was held at the Estadio Atlético de la VIDENA in Lima, Peru on 27 August 2024.

== Records ==
U20 standing records prior to the 2024 World Athletics U20 Championships were as follows:

Record	Athlete & Nationality	Mark	Location	Date
World U20 Record	Selemon Barega (ETH)	12:43.02	Brussels, Belgium	31 August 2018
Championship Record	Abreham Cherkos (ETH)	13:08.57	Bydgoszcz, Poland	13 July 2008
World U20 Leading	Biniam Mehary (ETH)	12:54.10	Los Angeles, United States	17 May 2024

== Results ==
The final was scheduled to start at 17:55.

Rank	Athlete	Nation	Time	Notes
1st place, gold medalist(s)	Andrew Alamisi	Kenya	13:41.14	
2nd place, silver medalist(s)	Abdisa Fayisa	Ethiopia	13:41.56	
3rd place, bronze medalist(s)	Keneth Kiprop	Uganda	13:41.73	SB
4	Ishmael Kipkurui	Kenya	13:42.27	
5	Samuel Cherop	Uganda	13:44.42	
6	Nibret Kinde	Ethiopia	13:44.67	
7	Emile Hafashimana	Burundi	13:49.23	
8	John Wele	Tanzania	13:56.95	
9	Karl Ottfalk	Sweden	13:57.13	PB
10	Juan Zijderlaan	Netherlands	14:01.14	
11	Unai Naranjo	Spain	14:01.77	
12	Desire Niyomwungere	Burundi	14:06.36	
13	Yamato Hamaguchi	Japan	14:16.29	
14	Kristian Børve	Norway	14:19.81	
15	Brayan Huanca	Peru	14:21.43	PB
16	Kaito Matsui	Japan	15:31.85	
