= Dan Kibet =

Ugandan runner (born 2004)

Personal information
- Nationality: Uganda
- Born: 10 February 2004 (22 years, 179 days old) Sukut Village, Kitawoi Sub-County, Kween District, Uganda
- Home town: Kapchorwa, Uganda
- Education: Chemanga High School

Sport
- Sport: Sport of athletics
- Events: 5000 metres 3000 metres
- College team: Goshen Maple Leafs
- Coached by: Addy Ruiter

Achievements and titles
- National finals: 2023 Ugandan Champs; • 5000m, 1st (gold); 2024 Ugandan XC; • 10km XC, 2nd (silver)
- Personal bests: 3000m: 7:45.73 (2022) 5000m: 13:16.31 (2023)
Medal record
Men's athletics
Representing Uganda
African U20 Championships
Gold medal – first place	2023 Ndola	5000 m
World Cross Country Championships
Silver medal – second place	2024 Belgrade	Senior team
Bronze medal – third place	2026 Tallahassee	Senior team
- Updated on 6 April 2024

Dan Kibet (born 10 February 2004) is a Ugandan middle- and long-distance runner. He was the gold medallist at the 2023 African U20 Championships over 5000 metres, and he was a part of the Ugandan silver medal-winning team at the 2024 World Athletics Cross Country Championships.

== Career ==
From 2019 to 2021, Kibet moved from Uganda to Indiana to compete in the National Association of Intercollegiate Athletics for the Goshen Maple Leafs. He recorded a best finish of 210th at the 2019 NAIA men's cross country championships.

Kibet represented Uganda at the 2023 World Athletics Cross Country Championships in February, where he finished 4th in the U20 race. Despite the Ugandan team's strong showing, they were not eligible for a medal as they only finished three runners, less than the four required for team scoring, due to other team members being denied visas. At the 2023 African U20 Championships in May, he won the 5000 m gold medal. His win was compared to those of Boniface Kiprop.

At the 2024 World Athletics Cross Country Championships in Belgrade, Kibet this time participated in the senior race, where he finished 11th and helped his team earn the silver medal.

== Personal life ==
Kibet was born in Sukut Village, Kitawoi Sub-County, Kween District, Uganda and he went to Chemanga High School. His parents are Michael Chebet and Patricia Yeko. Kibet started running competitively in 2019.He is coached by Addy Ruiter, who he met through Global Sports Communication at their camp in Chemwania in 2022.

== Statistics ==
=== Personal best progression ===
5000m progression
#	Mark	Pl.	Competition	Venue	Date	Ref.
1	14:12.61A	15th		Kampala, Uganda	7 May 2021	
2	13:46.06A	1st place, gold medalist(s)	Ugandan National Trials	Kampala, Uganda	4 Mar 2022	
3	13:19.38	7th	IFAM Oordegem	Oordegem, Belgium	27 May 2022	
4	13:16.31	8th	IFAM Oordegem	Oordegem, Belgium	26 May 2023	
