= Chimdessa Debele =

Ethiopian long-distance runner

Personal information
- Born: 13 September 2003 (age 23)

Sport
- Country: Ethiopia
- Sport: Long-distance running

Achievements and titles
- Personal bests: 5000 m: 13:59.9h (Hawassa 2022); 10,000 m: 27:46.38 (Hengelo 2022); 10K: 27:10 (Valencia 2022); Half marathon: 59:28 (Ras Al Khaimah 2025)
Medal record
Men's athletics
Representing Ethiopia
African Championships
Silver medal – second place	2022 Port Louis	10,000 metres
World Cross Country Championships
Silver medal – second place	2023 Bathurst	Senior team
World Marathon Majors
Bronze medal – third place	2025 Berlin	Marathon

Chimdessa Debele (born 13 September 2003) is an Ethiopian long-distance runner.

In 2022, he won the silver medal in the 10,000 metres at the African Championships. He competed in the senior men's race at the 2023 World Athletics Cross Country Championships, where he finished 11th and won a silver medal in the team competition.
