= Ky Robinson =

Australian long-distance runner (born 2002)

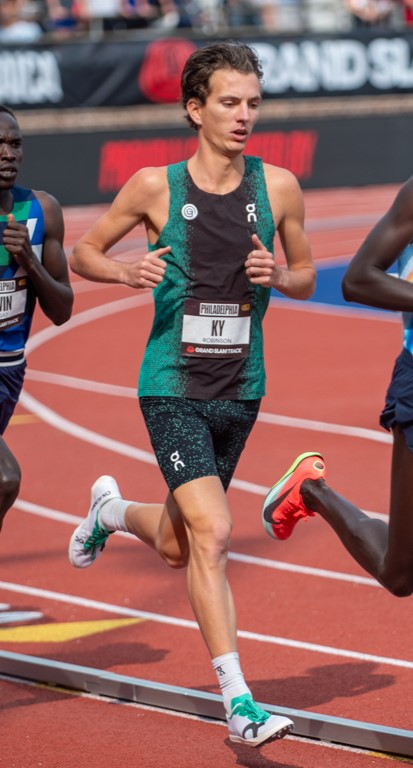
- Robinson competing in the 2025 Philadelphia Slam

Personal information
- Born: 27 February 2002 (age 24) Brisbane, Queensland, Australia

Sport
- Country: Australia
- Sport: Athletics
- Events: 3000 m, 5000 m, 10,000 m, 3000 m steeplechase
- College team: Stanford Cardinal
- Coached by: Ricardo Santos (2020–2024); Dathan Ritzenhein (2024–)

Achievements and titles
- Personal bests: Outdoor; 1500 m: 3:35.48 (Raleigh 2025); 3000 m steeplechase: 8:32.01 AU20R (Eugene 2021); 5000 m: 12:50.82 (Oslo 2026) AR; 10,000 m: 26:57.07 (San Juan Capistrano 2026) AR; Indoor; 3000 m: 7:30.38 NR (New York City 2025); 5000 m: 13:02.34 NR (Boston 2025)
Medal record
Men's athletics
Representing Australia
Commonwealth Games
Gold medal – first place	2026 Glasgow	10,000 m
Silver medal – second place	2026 Glasgow	5,000 m
World Indoor Championships
Bronze medal – third place	2025 Nanjing	3000 m
World Road Running Championships
Silver medal – second place	2026 Copenhagen	5K mixed team

Ky Robinson (born 27 February 2002) is an Australian long-distance runner. Competing for Stanford, he won the 5000 and 10,000 m at the 2023 NCAA Outdoor Track and Field Championships. In 2022, he represented his home country at the World Championships in Eugene and the Commonwealth Games in Birmingham. In December 2023, he set an Australian indoor 5000 m record in a time of 13:06.42.

== Prep career ==
Robinson started training for athletics when he was 15. In 2018, Robinson placed fourth in Australian U18 cross country championships. He finished in third the next year.

In 2019, Robinson won three Queensland U18 titles in the 1500m, 3000m, and the 2,000m steeplechase. That same year, he won The Great Public Schools Association of Queensland cross country championship in 2019 by running 18:12 in the 6 kilometer race.

== Collegiate career ==
In 2020, Robinson enrolled at Stanford University to compete for the Cardinal track and field and cross country teams.

Freshman Year (2020–21)

During his freshman year, Robinson immediately made an impact by being the No.3 runner on Stanford's 5th place cross country team. During track season, he broke the school record in the steeplechase by running 8:32.01 at the 2021 NCAA Outdoor Championships, where he finished 6th overall. He was also third in the steeplechase at the Pac-12 Championships. When the season was over, he had broken the Australia and Oceania U20 record in the steeplechase twice.

Sophomore Year (2021–22)

In his second season of cross country, Robinson placed 14th at the NCAA Cross Country Championships, where the Cardinals once again finished 5th. That Indoor track season, he made a splash early on broking the Dempsey Indoor record in the 5,000m by 13:21.85 to win the Husky Classic. He finished the indoor season with a second place finish in the 5,000m at the NCAA Indoor Championships, running 13:20.17. Outdoors, he was the Pac-12 runner-up in the steeplechase and placed third in the 5,000m before finishing fourth in the 5,000m at the NCAA Outdoor Championships, running a 13:30.23.

Robinson first represented Australia at the 2022 World Athletics Championships in Eugene, Oregon. He placed 8th in his heat and did not advance. Later that summer he competed for Australia at the Commonwealth Games, where he placed 6th overall in the 10,000m running 27:44.33.

Junior Year (2022–23)

Robinson made his season cross county debut at the Nuttycombe Wisconsin Invitational, where he out-kicked Northern Arizona's Nico Young to win the 8k in 23:09.9. He then went on the finish 10th at the NCAA championships. During indoor track, Robinson finished 7th in the 5000 and 10th in the 3000m at the NCAA Indoor Championships.

At the NCAA Outdoor Track Championships, Robinson won both the 5000m and 10,000m.

Senior Year (2023–24)

Heading into his senior year, Robinson signed an NIL deal with On, making him the first male NCAA athlete to sign with the company.

Robinson won the 2023 Pac-12 cross country and 2 weeks later took first at the NCAA West Regional. The next week he competed at the national meet in Charlottesville, Virginia and would finish 3rd behind Graham Blanks and Habtom Samuel leading Stanford to an 8th place finish.

At the 2024 NCAA Division I Indoor Track and Field Championships held in Boston, MA, Robinson placed 3rd in the 5000m and 5th in the 3000m.

== Professional career ==
Robinson joined the Boulder, Colorado-based On Athletics Club in June 2024.

== Championship record ==
=== International Competitions ===
Representing Australia
Year	Competition	Venue	Position	Event	Notes
2022	World Championships	Hayward Field	19th	5000 m	13:27.03
2022	Commonwealth Games	Alexander Stadium	6th	10,000 m	27:44.33
2023	World Athletics Cross Country Championships	Bathurst, Australia	23rd	Senior race	31:11
2025	World Indoor Championships	Nanjing, China	3rd	3000 m	7:47.09
2025	World Championships	Tokyo, Japan	4th	5000 m	12:59.61
2026	Commonwealth Games	Glasgow, United Kingdom	2nd	5000 m	13:24.70
2026	Commonwealth Games	Glasgow, United Kingdom	1st	10,000 m	27:48.93
2026	World Ultimate Championship	Budapest, Hungary	9th	5000 m	13:04.09

=== NCAA Championships ===
Representing Stanford
Year	Competition	Venue	Position	Event	Notes
2021	NCAA Cross Country Championships	Stillwater, Oklahoma	46th	10 km	30:56
2021	NCAA Outdoor Track and Field Championships	Hayward Field	6th	3000 m s'chase	27:44.33
2021	NCAA Cross Country Championships	Tallahassee, Florida	14th	10 km	29:15
2022	NCAA Indoor Track and Field Championships	Birmingham, Alabama	2nd	5000 m	13:20.17
2022	NCAA Outdoor Track and Field Championships	Hayward Field	4th	5000 m	13:30.23
2022	NCAA Cross Country Championships	Stillwater, Oklahoma	10th	10 km	29:07
2023	NCAA Indoor Track and Field Championships	Albuquerque Convention Center	10th	3000 m	8:03.87
2023	NCAA Indoor Track and Field Championships	Albuquerque Convention Center	7th	5000 m	13:47.11
2023	NCAA Outdoor Track and Field Championships	Mike A. Myers Stadium	1st	5000 m	14:04.77
2023	NCAA Outdoor Track and Field Championships	Mike A. Myers Stadium	1st	10,000 m	28:22.84
2024	NCAA Indoor Track and Field Championships	The Track at New Balance	5th	3000 m	7:46.13
2024	NCAA Indoor Track and Field Championships	The Track at New Balance	3rd	5000 m	13:27.79

=== Circuit performances ===
Grand Slam Track results
Slam	Race group	Event	Pl.	Time	Prize money
2025 Philadelphia Slam	Long distance	3000 m	3rd	8:01.92	US$15,000
