= Kuma Girma =

Ethiopian athlete (born 2005)

Personal information
- Nationality: Ethiopian
- Born: 24 November 2005 (age 20)

Sport
- Sport: Athletics
- Events: Middle-distance running, Long-distance running

Achievements and titles
- Personal bests: 1500m:3:36.60 (Rabat, 2024); 3000m: 7:29.20 (Shanghai, 2026); 5000m: 12:46.41 (Oslo, 2025); 5km road 12:58 (Al Khobar, 2024) AU20R; 10km road: 26:58 (Castellón, 2025)

Kuma Girma (born 24 November 2005) is an Ethiopian middle- and long-distance runner. He is the African under-20 record holder over 5 km on the road.

== Biography ==
He was a member of the silver medal-winning Ethiopian team at the 2023 World Cross Country Championships U20 race, finishing 13th individually. He followed that up by placing third in Jakob Ingebrigtsen's two-mile world record race at the 2023 Meeting de Paris in a time of 8:10.34. He set a 5000 m personal best of 13:03.37 at the 2023 Athletissima in Switzerland, to finish seventh overall.

In March 2024, he finished fourth at the delayed 2023 African Games in Accra, Ghana. In November 2024, he was runner-up to Jimmy Gressier at the Cross International d'Allonnes in France. In December 2024, he was runner-up to Hagos Gebrhiwet in the 5 km race at the Al Sharqiyah International, a World Athletics Elite Label event, in Al Khobar, Saudi Arabia. The time set a new African under-20 record.

On 8 February 2025, Girma won the men's 3000m in 7:31.78 at the Meeting Metz Moselle Athlelor – a World Indoor Tour Silver meeting in Metz, France. He finished runner-up over 5000 metres at the 2025 Shanghai Diamond League event, in a personal best time of 12:50.69, finishing narrowly behind the event winner Berihu Aregawi (12:50.45). He ran a 5000 metres personal best of 12:46.41 at the 2025 Bislett Games, part of the 2025 Diamond League, on 12 June 2025. He was runner-up in the 5000 metres at the 2025 BAUHAUS-galan event in Stockholm, part of the 2025 Diamond League.

In September 2025, he competed over 5000 metres at the 2025 World Championships in Tokyo, Japan, but was unable to complete the race.

In May 2026, he placed ninth over 3000 m in a personal best 7:29.20 at the 2026 Shanghai Diamond League. Competing in the Diamond League at the 2026 Athletissima in Lausanne, Switzerland on 21 August 2026, he placed seventh over 5000 metres.

== Personal life ==
He is the younger brother of fellow runner Lamecha Girma.
