= Reynold Cheruiyot =

Kenyan athlete

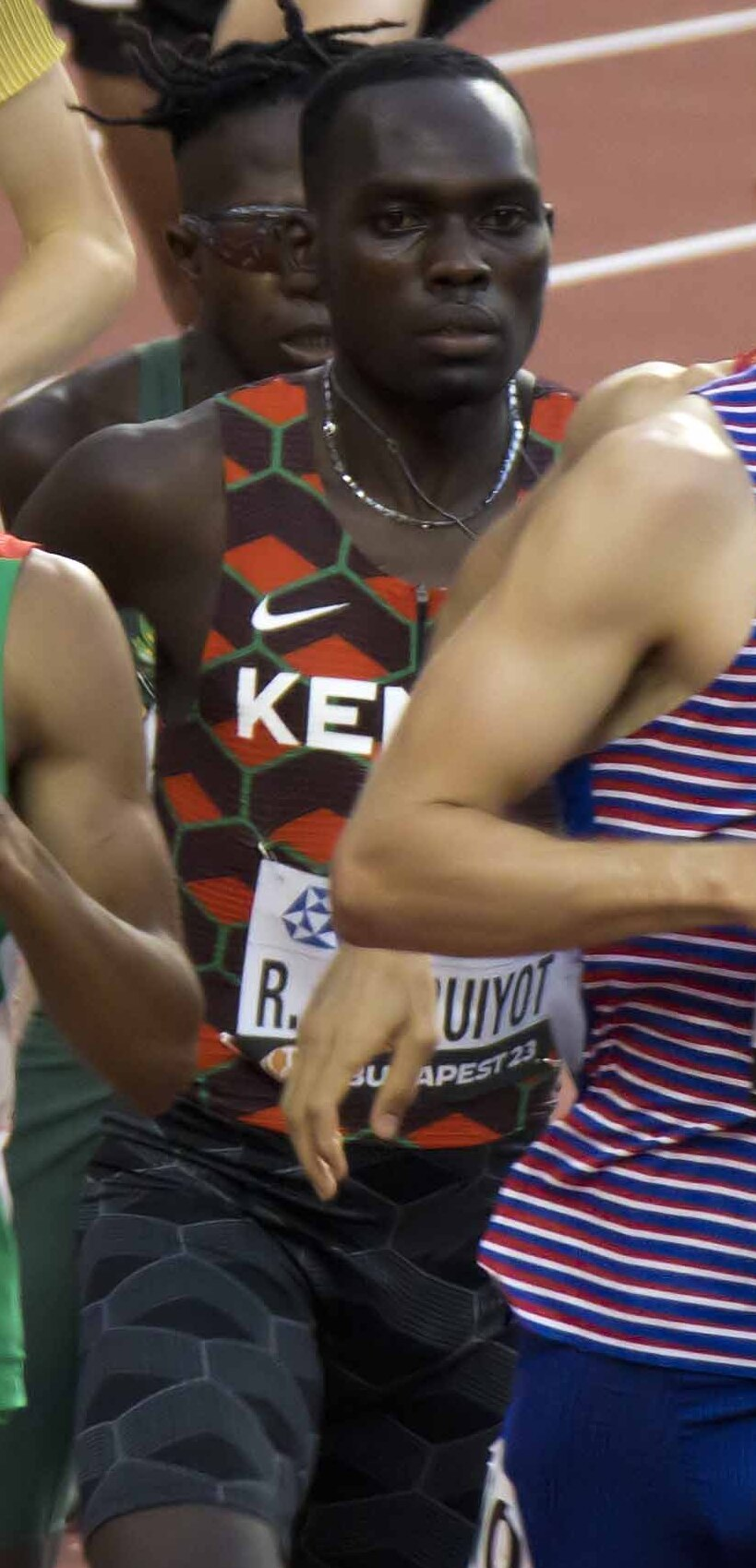
- Reynold Cheruiyot in 2023

Personal information
- Full name: Reynold Kipkorir Cheruiyot
- Nationality: Kenyan
- Born: 30 July 2004 (age 22) Bomet, Kenya

Sport
- Sport: Athletics

Achievements and titles
- Personal bests: 1500 m: 3:29.91 (Zurich, 2025); Mile: 3:47.46 (Eugene, 2025); 3000 m: 7:26.11 (Shanghai, 2026); 5000 m: 13:16.40 (Doha, 2025)
Medal record
World Championships
| Bronze medal – third place | 2025 Tokyo | 1500 m |
World U20 Championships
| Gold medal – first place | 2022 Cali | 1500 m |
African U20 Championships
| Gold medal – first place | 2023 Ndola | 1500m |
World Cross Country Championships
| Gold medal – first place | 2024 Belgrade | Mixed relay |
| Gold medal – first place | 2023 Bathurst | Junior team |
| Silver medal – second place | 2023 Bathurst | Junior race |

Reynold Kipkorir Cheruiyot (born 30 July 2004) is a Kenyan runner who competes in track and field and cross-country. He previously held the world junior record in the mile run.

== Early and personal life ==
He hails from Bomet County in Kenya. Both of his parents were athletes, but only raced in Kenya. He is not a relation of Timothy Cheruiyot but he has described him as his role model. He slowed down to allow Timothy Cheruiyot to overtake him at the finish line of the Kenyan World Championship Trials in July 2023 out of respect for him.

== Career ==
In August 2022, he won gold at the 2022 World Athletics U20 Championships in Cali, Colombia, in the 1500m race.

In January 2023, he finished second at the 2023 World Athletics Cross Country Championships in Bathurst, Australia, in the U20 race. In April 2023 he won gold in the 1500m at the African U20 Championships in Ndola, Zambia. He also finished second at the 5k at the Lille Half Marathon.

In May 2023, he lowered his personal best for the 1500m to 3:32.02 in Nairobi. Later that month he ran 1500m in 3:32.01 in Los Angeles. He lowered it to 3:30.30 at the Diamond League event in Silesia in July 2023.

Selected for the 1500m at the 2023 World Athletics Championships, he qualified for the final, in which he finished eighth. In September 2023, he set a new under-20 world record for the mile, running 3:48.06 at the Diamond League final in Eugene, Oregon. This time improved the previous record of İlham Tanui Özbilen by over a second and was ratified by World Athletics in November 2023.

On 20 April 2024, he won the 1500 metres at the Kip Keino Classic in Kenya in a time of 3:31.96. In May 2024, he finished third in the 1500 metres at the 2024 Doha Diamond League event.

In June 2024, he won the Kenyan Olympic trial in Nairobi over 1500 metres and was subsequently named in the Kenyan team for the 2024 Paris Olympics. He competed in Paris in the 1500 metres race, reaching the semi-final.

He won the 5000 metres at the 2025 Doha Diamond League in his debut Diamond League event at that distance in May 2025. The following week he was runner-up in the 1500 metres at the 2025 Meeting International Mohammed VI d'Athlétisme de Rabat, also part of the 2025 Diamond League. He won the 1500 metres at the Kenyan Athletics Championships in June 2025. He ran a personal best of 3:47.46 in the Bowerman Mile to finish fifth at the 2025 Prefontaine Classic on 5 July.

He won the Athletics Kenya world championship trials in July 2025. He set a new personal best of 3:29.91 to place second behind Niels Laros in the 1500m at the Diamond League Final in Zurich on 28 August. In September 2025, he won the bronze medal over 1500 metres at the 2025 World Championships in Tokyo, Japan.

In January 2026, he competed in the Kenyan mixed relay team at the 2026 World Athletics Cross Country Championships in Tallahassee, United States, helping the Kenyan team to a fourth-place finish overall. In April, he placed second to Emmanuel Wanyonyi over 1500 m at the Kip Keino Classic. The following month, he ran a 3000 metres personal best of 7:26.11 in finishing second at the 2026 Shanghai Diamond League. In June, he placed second in the 1500 m at the Kenyan Championships behind Timothy Cheruiyot in 3:32.35. He competed in the mile at the 2026 Commonwealth Games in Glasgow, Scotland.

== Personal bests ==
Outdoor

- 800 metres – 1:49.64 (Gap 2022)
- 1500 metres – 3:30.30 (Chorzów 2023)
- Mile run - 3:48.06 (Eugene 2023)
- 2000 metres – 4:48.14 (Brussels 2023)
- 3000 metres – 7:38.83 (Zagreb 2022)
- 5000 metres – 13:16.40 (Doha 2025)

Road

- 5K – 13:04 (Lille 2023)
- 10K – 28:46 (Bengaluru 2022)
