= Hana Basic =

Australian sprinter (born 1996)

Personal information
- Nationality: Australian
- Born: 22 January 1996 (age 30) Melbourne, Victoria, Australia

Sport
- Country: Australia
- Sport: Track and field
- Event: Sprint
- Club: Collingwood Harriers Athletics Club
- Coached by: John Nicolosi

Achievements and titles
- Personal best: 100 m: 11.16 (2021)

Hana Basic (born 22 January 1996) is an Australian sprinter who competes in the 100 metres. Basic was selected to represent Australia at the 2020 Summer Olympics in the women's 100 m event.

She studied for a Bachelor of Health and Physical Education at Deakin University.

== Early years ==
Basic was born in Melbourne, Australia, to her father Armin, originally from Banja Luka, who owned a café, and her mother Zana, a lawyer from Mostar. The family fled to Australia three years before her birth, at the outbreak of the Bosnian War. She has an older sister. Bosnian was her first language, as she only began learning English in primary school.

Basic started playing sports as a gymnast when she was in pre-school. When she was 9 years old her primary school Physical Education teacher saw her athletic potential and encouraged her to go to Nunawading Little Athletics. Basic went to her first nationals in the Under-10s for high jump and long jump. By the age of 14, she was already running under 12 seconds for the 100m and winning national sprint titles. Basic decided to make running her priority.

== Athletics career ==
Basic earned a scholarship to Carey Grammar School and went to the 2014 World Junior Championships in Athletics held in Eugene, Oregon and ran a personal best of 11.64 seconds for the 100 metres that year. She changed her diet and training.

On 17 April 2021 she won the Australian National Championship 100 metres in a time of 11.23 seconds. Just prior to that at the Queensland Classic she had clocked a new personal best of 11.18 to become the fourth fastest woman in Australian history. She then improved her personal best to 11.16 in July 2021 at Meeting de la Gruyere in Bulle, Switzerland.

She represented Australia in the 100 metres at the 2020 Tokyo Olympics, where she finished fifth in her heat running 11.32 seconds, so didn't advance to the semi-finals.
