= Ishmael Kipkurui =

Kenyan runner (born 2005)

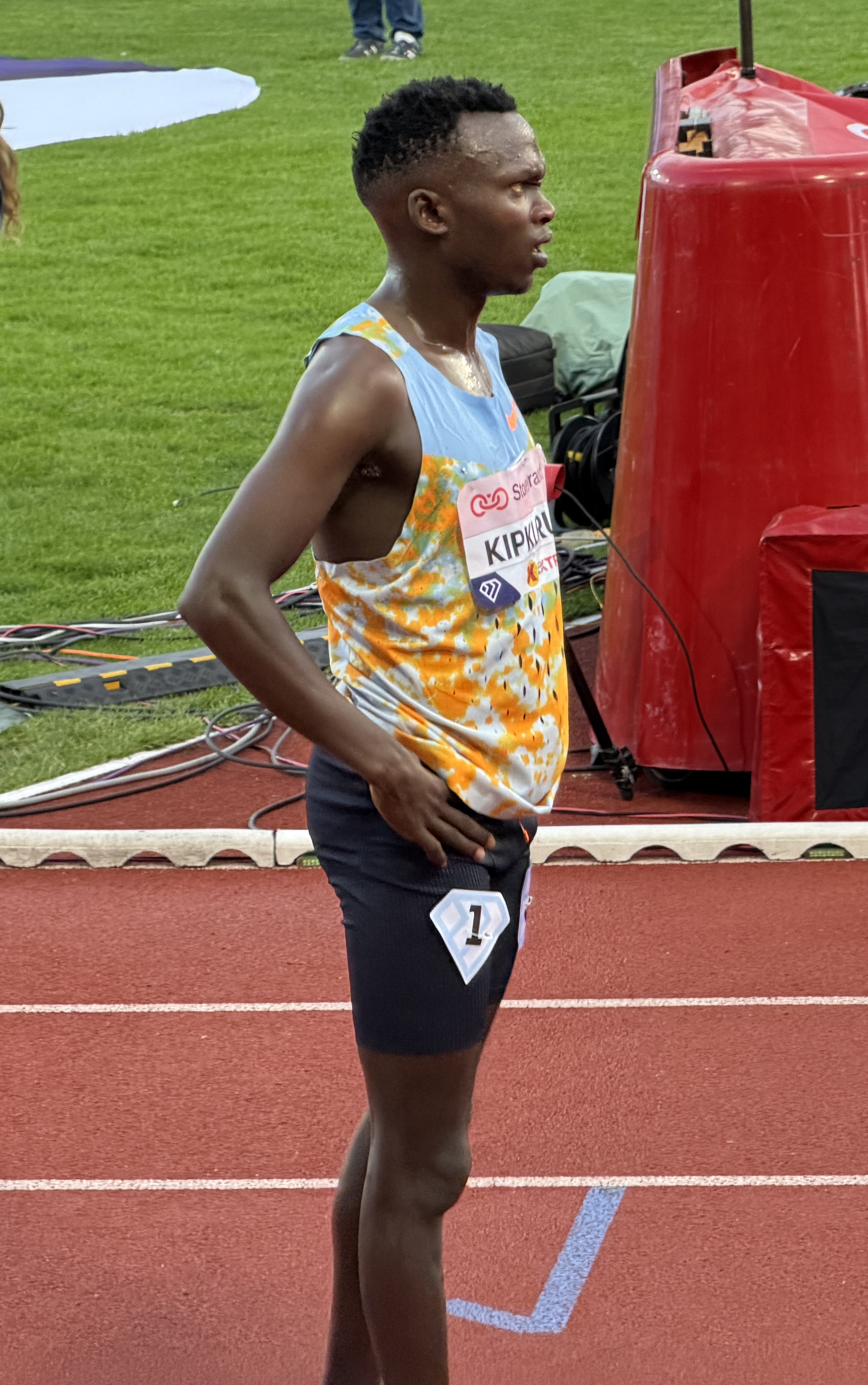
- Kipkuiri at Bislett Games 2026.

Personal information
- Full name: Ishmael Rokitto Kipkurui
- Nationality: Kenya
- Born: 10 February 2005 (age 21) Baringo County, Kenya
- Height: 162 cm (5 ft 4 in)
- Weight: 52 kg (115 lb)

Sport
- Sport: Athletics
- Events: 3000 metres 5000 metres 10,000 metres
- College team: New Mexico Lobos
- Club: Central Rift
- Coached by: Julius Kirwa; Barnaba Kitilit

Achievements and titles
- National finals: 2020 Kenyan U18 XC; • 6km XC, 5th; 2022 Kenyan Champs; • 5000m, 2nd (silver)
- Personal bests: 3000m: 7:38.06 (2023); 2 miles: 8:09.23 NU20R (2023); 5000m: 13:05.47 (2023); 10000m: 26:47.72 (2025)
Medal record
Men's athletics
Representing Kenya
World Cross Country Championships
Gold medal – first place	2024 Belgrade	Senior team
Gold medal – first place	2023 Bathurst	U20 race
Gold medal – first place	2023 Bathurst	U20 team
Silver medal – second place	2026 Tallahassee	Senior team
- Updated on 12 November 2025

Ishmael Rokitto Kipkurui (born 10 February 2005), also spelled Ishmael Kipkirui, Ishmael Kirui, or Ismael Kipkurui, is a Kenyan middle- and long-distance runner. He was the individual winner of the 2023 World Cross Country Championships U20 race, leading his Kenyan team to a gold medal finish. He is also the Kenyan under-20 record-holder in the two miles run after his runner-up performance to Jakob Ingebrigtsen at the 2023 Meeting de Paris.

== Career ==
After trying for and failing to make the Kenyan team at the 2021 World Athletics U20 Championships, Kipkurui would not make his international debut until 2022, qualifying for the African Championships by virtue of his 2nd-place finish at the Kenyan Athletics Championships in the 5000 m. At the championships, he finished 6th in 13:49.13, 13 seconds behind winner Hailemariyam Amare despite dealing with an injury.

Kipkurui began his 2023 season at the 2023 World Athletics Cross Country Championships, competing in the U20 race. As the Kenyan team had trained together in a camp in Kigari, they had drafted a plan to use team tactics during the race, frequently checking on other athletes to encourage them to move together. He won the individual race in 24:29, helping Kenya score a victory over Ethiopia by just one point. Kipkurui followed up his win with another victory and personal best of 7:41.38 in the 3000 m at the Maurie Plant Meet - Melbourne.

Kipkurui only finished 4th at the Kenyan world championship trials in the 5000 m, behind Jacob Krop, Daniel Ebenyo, and Cornelius Kemboi. However, Simiyu was not selected for the Kenyan squad, opening up a final spot for Kipkirui to run in the 5000 m and advance to the finals. In the final, Kipkurui went with the early pace of 2:14 through the first two laps, but then broke from the pack and split a 62-second lap, leading the race for a full mile with no other athletes willing to catch him. After 2400 metres, the chase pack had reeled in Kipkurui, and Kipkurui would gradually fade from then on finishing 10th overall.

He competed for the University of New Mexico for the 2025 track season. With the team, he set the NCAA record in the 10,000 meters at The TEN in March with a time of 26:50.21. In June, he won the same event at the 2025 NCAA Division I Outdoor Track and Field Championships before announcing he would turn professional with Nike.

=== International competitions ===
Achievements in international competitions representing Kenya
Year	Competition	Venue	Position	Event	Time	Ref
2022	African Championships	Saint Pierre, Mauritius	6th	5000 m	13:49.13	
2023	World XC Championships	Bathurst, New South Wales, Australia	1st	8 km	24:29	
2023	World XC Championships	Bathurst, New South Wales, Australia	1st	Team Kenya	22 points	
2023	World Championships	Budapest, Hungary	10th	5000 m	13:21.20	
2024	World XC Championships	Belgrade, Serbia	DNF	10 km	DNF	
2024	World XC Championships	Belgrade, Serbia	1st	Team Kenya	19 points	
2024	World U20 Championships	Villa Deportiva Nacional; Lima, Peru	4th	5000 m	13:42.27	
2025	World Championships	Tokyo, Japan National Stadium	4th	10,000 m	28:56.48	
2026	Commonwealth Games	Glasgow, United Kingdom	10th	10,000 m	28:04.66	

== Personal life ==
Kipkurui is from Baringo County, Kenya, and he is a member of the Central Rift training club. He is coached by Kenyan team head Julius Kirwa and his personal coach Barnaba Kitilit. He says that while many of his peers are fans of association football, he prefers athletics both as a participant and fan, and would "never cheat on [athletics] with football".

In 2023, Kipkurui was a Form Three student in addition to being a professional athlete. This meant that he often had to run at 4 a.m. using torches to light his path in order to attend school on time at 6 a.m. He believed that his win at the World Cross Country Championships U20 race was a "supernatural intervention" from his Maker.

== Statistics ==
=== Best performances ===
Event	Mark	Pl.	Competition	Venue	Date	Ref
Two miles	8:09.23 NU20R	2nd place, silver medalist(s)	Meeting de Paris	Paris, France	9 June 2023	
5000 metres	13:05.47	8th	Bislett Games	Oslo, Norway	15 June 2023	
