= Rocky Hansen =

American middle-distance runner

Personal information
- Born: September 5, 2004 (age 21)

Sport
- Sport: Athletics
- Event(s): Middle-distance running, Cross country running
- College team: Wake Forest Demon Deacons

Achievements and titles
- Personal best(s): 1500 m: 3:38.74 (Salem, 2025); 5000 m: 13:07.77 (Los Angeles, 2025); Indoors; Mile: 3:57.90 (Blacksburg, 2025); 3000 m: 7:56.53 (Boston, 2024); 5000 m: 13:12.65 (Virginia Beach, 2025)

Rocky Hansen (born September 5, 2004) is an American middle- and long-distance and cross country runner.

== Biography ==
From Arden, North Carolina in the Blue Ridge Mountains, Hansen attended Christ School in North Carolina.

He was the NCISAA State Cross Country champion and became the North Carolina high school one-mile record holder, running 4:00.76 at the RunningLane Track Championships in Huntsville, Alabama, as well as the state two-mile record holder. He was named the Gatorade NC State Athlete of the Year. In February 2023, he won the boys’ mile run at the New Balance Indoor Grand Prix.

In May 2023, Hansen became the first North Carolina prep schooler to accomplish the sub-four minute mile, running 3:59.56 to win the mile at the Virginia High Performance Meet in Charlottesville. He committed to attend Wake Forest University. He suffered injuries at the end of 2023 but placed second at the 2024 Nuttycombe Cross Country race for Wake Forest in September 2024 behind Parker Wolfe.

In March 2025, Hansen placed third over 5000 metres at the 2025 NCAA Indoor Championships in Virginia Beach in 13:12.65. In June 2025, he placed fifth in the 5000 metres at the NCAA Outdoor Championships in Eugene, Oregon. He ran a personal best 13:07.77 for the 5000 metres at the Sunset Tour Los Angeles on July 12, 2025.

On October 31, 2025, he won the ACC individual cross country title for Wake Forest, breaking the 8 kilometer course record by 40 seconds to win ahead of Gary Martin and George Couttie. On 14 November, he won the NCAA South East regional cross country championship as Wake Forest won the team event. The following weekend, he was runner-up to Habtom Samuel at the 2025 NCAA Cross Country Championships in Missouri. On 6 December, he had a second place finish at the 2025 USA Cross Country Championships behind Parker Wolfe to automatically gain selection for the American national team at the 2026 World Cross Country Championships, although sadly for Hansen he had to pull out shortly before the race with injury.

Competing at the 2026 NCAA East Regional in Lexington, Kentucky on 29 May, he ran 13:28.19 for the 5000 metres to place second behind Marco Langon. On 12 June, competing at the 2026 NCAA Outdoor Championships, he placed second over 5000 metres in Eugene, behind Habtom Samuel.
