= Thierry Ndikumwenayo =

Spanish long-distance runner (born 1997)

Personal information
- Nationality: Spain (from November 2022); Burundi (before)
- Born: 26 March 1997 (age 29) Burundi

Sport
- Country: Spain (from April 2023); Burundi (before)
- Sport: Long-distance running
- Club: Playas de Castellon

Achievements and titles
- Personal bests: Outdoor; 1500 m: 3:37.25 (Castellón 2021); 3000 m: 7:25.93 (Monaco 2022) NR; 5000 m: 12:48.10 (Oslo 2024); Indoor; 3000 m: 7:50.19 (Sabadell 2018); Road; 10K: 28:04 (Castellón 2022)
Medal record
Men's athletics
Representing Spain
European Championships
Bronze medal – third place	2024 Rome	10,000 m
European Cross Country Championships
Gold medal – first place	2024 Antalya	Team race
Gold medal – first place	2025 Lagoa	Senior Men
Bronze medal – third place	2024 Antalya	Senior Men
European Games
Gold medal – first place	2023 Kraków-Małopolska	5000 m
Representing Burundi
Summer Youth Olympics
Silver medal – second place	2014 Nanjing	3000 m

Thierry Ndikumwenayo (born 26 March 1997) is a long-distance runner, most well known for his cross-country running results. Born in Burundi, he represents Spain internationally. He previously competed for his country of birth.

== Biography ==
=== Junior athlete (2012–2016) ===
Ndikumwenayo was introduced to athletics in 2012 by a friend, who challenged him to a race. By 2014, as a 17-year-old, he won the silver medal in the boys' 3000 metres event at the 2014 Summer Youth Olympics held in Nanjing, China. After that performance, he was invited to train in Spain as part of a project offering opportunities to Burundian and Sudanese runners. He subsequently became a member of Playas de Castellon athletics club, who paid for his accommodation. During this time, he continued representing Burundi, coming 7th in 5000 m at the 2015 African Junior Championships, and 9th in the 2015 All-Africa Games. In 2016, he came 7th in the 5000 m at the African Championships, and ran 28:14 for 4th at the 10 km Corrida de Houilles.

=== 2017–2021 ===
Ndikumwenayo's 2017 season included his first taste of international cross country racing, placing 95th in the senior men's race at the 2017 IAAF World Cross Country Championships held in Kampala, Uganda. He also ran a then personal best 5000 m time at the Gala dei Casteilli in Bellinzona (13:25.55).

In 2018, Ndikumwenayo competed at his first world indoor championships. He went out in his 3000 m heat. He also competed at the ECCC Championships, winning the 5000 m and coming second over 3000 m for Playas de Castellon.

In 2019, he competed in the senior men's race at the 2019 IAAF World Cross Country Championships held in Aarhus, Denmark, finishing in 9th place, an improvement of 86 places on two years earlier. This performance qualified him for the 2019 World Athletics Championships held in Doha, Qatar, but he did not finish his race in the 10,000 m. Later that year, he won the men's race at the Cross Internacional de la Constitución held in Alcobendas, Spain.

His 2020 and 2021 seasons were both curtailed by the implications of the COVID-19 pandemic, which meant that he did not race outside of the Iberian Peninsula. During this period, he set a marginal PB over 5000 m with 13:25.30, and won the 2021 Almond Blossom Cross Country. In the latter part of 2021, however, he failed to display much form in cross country; his best place was 6th in the Cross de Atapuerca, and he came a disappointing 36th at the Cross Internacional de Italica, held in Santiponce, Sevilla.

=== 2022–present ===
2022 was Ndikumwenayo's breakthrough season. He started the year with a 10 km PB in Castellon of 28:04, and went on to win the Gran Premio Campo a Traves in Serradilla, Spain. He ran as a pacemaker in the Barcelona Half Marathon and Madrid Marathon. Ndikumwenayo began his track season in May at the Desafio Nerja, and ran a near-19 second 5000 m personal best of 13:06.58. Three weeks later, he marginally improved his best time over the distance at the Meeting Iberoamericano in Huelva, placing third in 13:06.46. The improvements in his times and performances gained him an entry to the Golden Gala Pietro Mennea in Rome (his first Diamond League race), where he ran a PB and NR of 12:59.39 for 8th. He raced several more times on the Diamond League circuit over the course of that year: he was 2nd at the Meeting de Paris 5000 m (13:05.24) and finished 5th over 3000 m at the Bauhaus-Galan (7:34.91 PB), before suffering an injury setback which ruled him out of the 2022 World Athletics Championships in Oregon. He later shocked an incredible field to win his first ever Diamond League race in the Herculis 3000 m. He ran a Burundian national record, a world-leading time, and Diamond League record to win in 7:25.94. He came 11th in the 5000 m at the Memorial Van Damme (13:10.71), and competed in the Weltklasse Zurich Diamond League Final, but did not finish the race. His 2022 cross country season began with 3 successive victories in the Cross Internacional de Soria, Cross de Atapuerca and Cross de Italica, at about which time he gained Spanish citizenship.

== Statistics ==
=== Circuit performances ===
Grand Slam Track results
Slam	Race group	Event	Pl.	Time	Prize money
2025 Kingston Slam	Long distance	5000 m	6th	14:41.23	US$12,500
2025 Kingston Slam	Long distance	3000 m	7th	8:08.52	US$12,500

=== Achievements ===
Year	Competition	Venue	Position	Event	Notes
Representing Burundi
2014	Summer Youth Olympics	Nanjing, China	2nd	3000 m	8:06.05
2015	African Junior Championships	Addis Ababa, Ethiopia	7th	5000 m	15:11.49
2015	African Games	Brazzaville, Republic of Congo	9th	5000 m	13:27.38
2016	African Championships	Durban, South Africa	7th	5000 m	13:26.24
2017	World Cross Country Championships	Kampala, Uganda	95th	10 km XC	32:55
2018	World Indoor Championships	Birmingham, United Kingdom	14th (h)	3000 m	8:09.11
2019	World Cross Country Championships	Aarhus, Denmark	9th	10 km XC	32:29
2019	World Championships	Doha, Qatar	-	10,000 m	DNF
Representing Spain
2023	European Games	Chorzów, Poland	1st	5000 m	13:25.48
2023	World Championships	Budapest, Hungary	9th (h)	5000 m	13:34.03
2024	World Cross Country Championships	Belgrade, Serbia	9th	10 km XC	28:36
2024	European Championships	Rome, Italy	5th	5000 m	13:23.26
2024	European Championships	Rome, Italy	3rd	10,000 m	28:00.96
2024	Olympic Games	Paris, France	15th	5000 m	13:24.07
2024	Olympic Games	Paris, France	9th	10,000 m	26:49.49
2025	World Championships	Tokyo, Japan	14th (h)	5000 m	13:47.72
2025	World Championships	Tokyo, Japan	9th	10,000 m	28:59.07
