= Keneth Kiprop =

Ugandan long-distance runner (born 2005)

Personal information
- National team: Ugandan
- Born: 13 May 2005 (age 21)

Sport
- Country: Uganda
- Sport: Athletics
- Event: Long-distance running

Achievements and titles
- Personal bests: 3000m: 7:33.70 (Shanghai, 2026); 5000m: 13:00.49 (Shaoxing, 2025)
Medal record
Men's athletics
Representing Uganda
World U20 Championships
Bronze medal – third place	2024 Lima	5000m
World Cross Country Championships
Bronze medal – third place	2026 Tallahassee	Senior team

Keneth Kiprop (born 13 May 2005) is an Ugandan long-distance runner. In 2024, he was a bronze medalist at the World U20 Championships over 5000 metres. In 2025, he became Ugandan national champion in cross country running.

== Biography ==
Kiprop finished sixth at the 2023 World Athletics Cross Country Championships U20 race in Bathurst. He won the Cardiff Cross Challenge in 2023 and retained the title on the 2024–25 World Athletics Cross Country Tour in November 2024.

On 27 August 2024, he won the bronze medal at the 2024 World Athletics U20 Championships in the men's 5000 metres in Lima, Peru.

In February 2025, he ran a time of 29 minutes and 28 seconds to win the Ugandan national cross country championships in Tororo over 10 km. He finished in fifth place in the 5000 metres race at the 2025 Shanghai Diamond League event in China on 3 May 2025, in a new personal best time of 13:00.49. He also finished fifth in the 5000 metres in Stockholm in June 2025 at the 2025 BAUHAUS-galan event, part of the 2025 Diamond League. He was selected for the 5000 metres at the 2025 World Athletics Championships in Tokyo, Japan, but did not qualify for the final.

Kiprop was runner-up at the Ugandan national cross country championships in Mbale in November 2025. In January 2026, he was confirmed in the Uganda team for the 2026 World Athletics Cross Country Championships in Tallahassee, where he placed tenth overall, and won the bronze medal in the team competition. Later in January 2026, he won the Lotto Cross Cup de Hannut. In May, he ran a personal best for the 3000 m of 7:33.70 at the 2026 Shanghai Diamond League and had a top-ten finish over 5000 m at the 2026 Xiamen Diamond League. On 19 September, he competed in the 5k race at the 2026 World Athletics Road Running Championships, running a 13:04 personal best to finish in fifth.
