= 2023 World Athletics Cross Country Championships =

- 2023 World Athletics Cross Country Championships logo
- Organisers: World Athletics
- Edition: 44th
- Dates: 18 February 2023
- Host city: Bathurst, Australia
- Venue: Mount Panorama Circuit
- Level: Senior and U20
- Type: Cross country
- Events: 5
- Distances: ~10 km – Senior men and women ~8 km – U20 men ~6 km – U20 women ~4×2 km – Mixed relay
- Participation: 453 athletes from 48 nations
- Official website: Bathurst 2023

The 2023 World Athletics Cross Country Championships took place on 18 February 2023 in Bathurst, Australia. It was the event's 44th edition and the second time after Auckland in 1988 that the championships were held in Oceania.

In March 2020 the course was revealed, to be held in the infield of the Mount Panorama Circuit.

In December 2020, the event was postponed from 2021 to 2022 due to the COVID-19 pandemic and Australian travel restrictions. The championships were once again delayed to 2023 in September 2021, due to Australian travel restrictions.

== Schedule ==
The junior races preceded the senior races, and the senior men's event concluded the program.

Date	Time (AEDT)	Events
18 February	15:30	Mixed Relay
18 February	16:10	U20 race women
18 February	16:50	U20 race men
18 February	17:30	Senior race women
18 February	18:10	Senior race men

== Medalists ==
Event	Gold		Silver		Bronze	
Individual
Senior men	Jacob Kiplimo; Uganda	29:17	Berihu Aregawi; Ethiopia	29:26	Joshua Cheptegei; Uganda	29:37
Senior women	Beatrice Chebet; Kenya	33:48	Tsigie Gebreselama; Ethiopia	33:56	Agnes Jebet Ngetich; Kenya	34:00
U20 men	Ishmael Kipkurui; Kenya	24:29	Reynold Kipkorir Cheruiyot; Kenya	24:30	Boki Diriba; Ethiopia	24:31
U20 women	Senayet Getachew; Ethiopia	20:53	Medina Eisa; Ethiopia	21:00	Pamela Kosgei; Kenya	21:01
Team
Senior men	Kenya: Geoffrey Kamworor (4); Kibiwott Kandie (5); Daniel Ebenyo (6); Sabastian Sawe (7); Nicholas Kipkorir ~~(13)~~; Emmanuel Kiprop Kipruto ~~(19)~~	22 pts	Ethiopia: Berihu Aregawi (2); Hailemariyam Amare (9); Mogos Tuemay (10); Chimdessa Debele (11); Selemon Barega ~~(12)~~; Getaneh Molla ~~(14)~~	32 pts	Uganda: Jacob Kiplimo (1); Joshua Cheptegei (3); Rogers Kibet (15); Martin Kiprotich (18); Issac Kibet ~~(24)~~; Samuel Kibet ~~(30)~~	37 pts
Senior women	Kenya: Beatrice Chebet (1); Agnes Jebet Ngetich (3); Grace Loibach Nawowuna (4); Edinah Jebitok (8); Emily Chebet ~~(9)~~; Cintia Chepngeno ~~(DNF)~~	16 pts	Ethiopia: Tsigie Gebreselama (2); Fotyen Tesfay (5); Hawi Feysa (6); Gete Alemayehu (12); Wede Kefale ~~(15)~~; ~~Letesenbet Gidey (DQ)~~	25 pts	Uganda: Prisca Chesang (7); Stella Chesang (10); Doreen Chesang (11); Annet Chemengich Chelengat (13); Rispa Cherop ~~(26)~~; Mercyline Chelengat ~~(32)~~	41 pts
U20 men	Kenya: Ishmael Kipkurui (1); Reynold Kipkorir Cheruiyot (2); Dennis Mutuku (9); Daniel Kinyanjui (10); Charles Rotich ~~(12)~~; Dennis Kipkurui ~~(14)~~	22 pts	Ethiopia: Boki Diriba (3); Bereket Zekele (5); Abel Bekele (7); Bereket Nega (8); Kuma Girma ~~(13)~~; Yismaw Dillu ~~(15)~~	23 pts	United States: Emilio Young (16); Marco Langon (19); Max Sannes (21); Kole Mathison (25); Micah Wilson ~~(27)~~; Evan Jenkins ~~(53)~~	81 pts
U20 women	Ethiopia: Senayet Getachew (1); Medina Eisa (2); Lemlem Nibret (5); Meseret Yeshaneh (7); Tinebeb Asres ~~(8)~~; Melknat Wudu ~~(11)~~	15 pts	Kenya: Pamela Kosgei (3); Faith Cherotich (4); Joyline Chepkemoi (6); Diana Chepkemoi (9)	22 pts	United States: Ellie Shea (10); Irene Riggs (12); Karrie Baloga (13); Zariel Macchia (19); Eva Klingbeil ~~(29)~~; Allie Zealand ~~(34)~~	54 pts
Relay
Mixed relay	Kenya: Emmanuel Wanyonyi; Mirriam Cherop; Kyumbe Munguti; Brenda Chebet	23:14	Ethiopia: Adehena Kasaye; Hawi Abera; Getnet Wale; Birke Haylom	23:21	Australia: Oliver Hoare; Jessica Hull; Stewart McSweyn; Abbey Caldwell	23:26

== Medal table ==
* Host nation (Australia)

Rank	Nation	Gold	Silver	Bronze	Total
1	Kenya	6	2	2	10
2	Ethiopia	2	7	1	10
3	Uganda	1	0	3	4
4	United States	0	0	2	2
5	Australia*	0	0	1	1
Totals (5 entries)		9	9	9	27

- Note: Totals include both individual and team medals, with medals in the team competition counting as one medal.

== Participation ==
453 athletes from 48 countries were scheduled to participate.

- Athlete Refugee Team (4)
- Australia (38)
- Brazil (3)
- Burundi (6)
- Canada (39)
- China (9)
- Colombia (4)
- Cook Islands (2)
- Denmark (2)
- Egypt (2)
- Eritrea (7)
- Estonia (2)
- Ethiopia (29)
- Fiji (9)
- French Polynesia (2)
- Ghana (5)
- Great Britain (22)
- Guam (2)
- Hong Kong (1)
- India (5)
- Japan (20)
- Kenya (30)
- Kiribati (2)
- Kyrgyzstan (1)
- Latvia (1)
- Lebanon (7)
- Liberia (4)
- Marshall Islands (1)
- Mexico (8)
- Morocco (10)
- New Zealand (26)
- Norfolk Island (1)
- Northern Mariana Islands (2)
- Pakistan (2)
- Papua New Guinea (11)
- Seychelles (1)
- Singapore (3)
- Solomon Islands (5)
- Somalia (1)
- South Africa (27)
- Spain (24)
- Tanzania (4)
- Uganda (27)
- United Arab Emirates (2)
- United States (35)
- Uruguay (2)
- Venezuela (1)
- Zimbabwe (2)
