= Berihu Aregawi =

Ethiopian long-distance runner (born 2001)

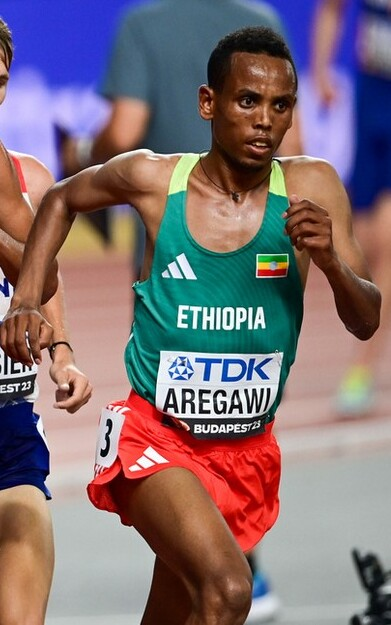
- Berihu at the 2023 World Athletics Championships

Personal information
- Full name: Berihu Aregawi Teklehaimanot
- Nationality: Ethiopian
- Born: 28 February 2001 (age 25) Atsbi Wenberta, Tigray, Ethiopia

Sport
- Country: Ethiopia
- Sport: Athletics
- Event: Long-distance running

Achievements and titles
- Olympic finals: Olympic Men's 10,000m race 2nd position
- Personal bests: 3000 m: 7:21.28 NR (Chorzów 2024); 5000 m: 12:40.45 (Lausanne 2023); 10,000 m: 26:31.13 (Nerja 2024); Road; 5 km: 12:49 WR (Barcelona 2021); 10 km: 26:33 (Laredo 2023)
Medal record
Men's athletics
Representing Ethiopia
Olympic Games
| Silver medal – second place | 2024 Paris | 10,000 m |
World Indoor Championships
| Silver medal – second place | 2025 Nanjing | 3000 m |
Diamond League
| First place | 2021 | 5000 m |
| First place | 2024 | 5000 m |
World Junior Championships
| Bronze medal – third place | 2018 Tampere | 10,000 m |
Youth Olympic Games
| Silver medal – second place | 2018 Buenos Aires | 3000 m |
African Youth Games
| Gold medal – first place | 2018 Algiers | 3000 m |
World Cross Country Championships
| Gold medal – first place | 2026 Tallahassee | Senior team |
| Silver medal – second place | 2026 Tallahassee | Senior race |
| Silver medal – second place | 2023 Bathurst | Senior race |
| Silver medal – second place | 2023 Bathurst | Senior team |
| Silver medal – second place | 2024 Belgrade | Senior race |
| Bronze medal – third place | 2024 Belgrade | Senior team |

Berihu Aregawi Teklehaimanot (Tigrinya: በሪሁ ኣረጋዊ; born 28 February 2001) is an Ethiopian long-distance runner and the current world record holder in the 5000 m road race. At the Paris 2024 Olympics, Berihu won a silver medal in the 10,000 m, and he placed fourth in the 10,000 m at the 2020 Tokyo Olympics. Berihu won a silver medal at the 2023 World Athletics Cross Country Championships. He also won a silver medal in the 3,000 m at the 2025 World Athletics Indoor Championships.

At age 17, Berihu won a bronze medal in the 10,000 m at the 2018 World Under-20 Championships.

== Career ==
Berihu Aregawi was the bronze medalist in the 10,000 metres at the 2018 World U20 Championships in Tampere behind Rhonex Kipruto and Jacob Kiplimo. He won the 3000 metres race at the African Youth Games that year. He then went to Argentina for the Summer Youth Olympics held in Buenos Aires and placed second in the combined 3000 m event.

In November 2019, Berihu won the Great Ethiopian Run (10 kilometres road race).

=== 2021 ===
On 8 June 2021, he finished third in the Ethiopian trial behind Selemon Barega and Yomif Kejelcha in the 10,000 m to effectively seal his place at the delayed 2020 Tokyo Olympics. Berihu finished fourth on his Olympic debut in the 10,000 metres race behind Barega who won gold.

On 31 December 2021, Berihu set a world record in the 5 km run at the Cursa dels Nassos 5K in Barcelona in a time of 12 minutes 49 seconds, improving previous mark of Joshua Cheptegei by 2 seconds. He had 38 second margin of victory.

=== 2022 ===
At the 2022 World Indoor Championships in Belgrade, he was eliminated in the heats of the 3000 m event. Berihu finished seventh in the 10,000 m race at the outdoor World Championships held in Eugene, Oregon that year.

=== 2023 ===
In February 2023, he won the silver medal on a 10 km course at the World Cross Country Championships in Bathurst, Australia with a time of 29:26. The winner was Jacob Kiplimo in 29:17.

On 11 March, Berihu narrowly missed by nine seconds Rhonex Kipruto's 10 km world record in Laredo, Spain, clocking an Ethiopian record and the second-fastest time in history of 26:33.

He ran the fifth-fastest track 5000m time in history when running 12:40.45 to win the Diamond League event in Lausanne in June 2023.

In the 10,000m race at the 2023 World Athletics Championships in Budapest, he placed fourth.

=== 2024 ===
In 2024, he won the Cross Internacional Juan Muguerza, a World Athletics Cross Country Tour Gold meeting. He won silver at the 2024 World Athletics Cross Country Championships in Serbia. He met the 2024 Paris Olympics standard for the 5000 metres finishing second at the LA Grand Prix in May 2024.

At the 2024 Paris Olympics, Berihu secured a silver medal in the 10,000 metres, running 26:43.44 behind Joshua Cheptegei's new Olympic record of 26:43.14.

At the 2024 Silesia Diamond League, Berihu competed in the 3000 metres, running 7:21.28 behind Jakob Ingebrigtsen's new world record of 7:17.55. This time places Berihu as the third fastest 3000 metre runner in history, behind Daniel Komen, who held the previous world record of 7:20.67, and Ingebrigtsen.

=== 2025 ===
In January 2025, he retained his title at the Cross Internacional Juan Muguerza in Elgoibar. Berihu was selected for the 3000 metres at the 2025 World Athletics Indoor Championships in Nanjing in March 2025, where he secured a silver medal with a time of 7:46.25 behind Jakob Ingebrigtsen, who ran 7:46.09.

Be ran a meeting record of 12:50.45 to win the 5000 metres at the 2025 Shanghai Diamond League ahead of compatriot Kuma Girma. He finished second in the 10,000 metres at the 2025 Prefontaine Classic on 5 July, in a race that doubled up as the Ethiopian trials for the 2025 World Championships. In September 2025, he competed over 10,000 metres at the 2025 World Championships in Tokyo, Japan, finishing in twelfth place.

=== 2026 ===
In January 2026, he was selected for the Ethiopian team to compete at the 2026 World Athletics Cross Country Championships in Tallahassee, winning the silver medal in the individual race and gold with Ethiopia in the team competition. In November, he had a top-ten finish at the Cross Internacional de Itálica in Seville.

== Achievements ==
=== International competitions ===
Representing Ethiopia
| Year | Competition | Venue | Position | Event | Result |
|---|---|---|---|---|---|
| 2018 | World U20 Championships | Tampere, Finland | 3rd | 10,000 m | 27:48.41 PB |
| 2018 | African Youth Games | Algiers, Algeria | 1st | 3000 m | 7:50.98 |
| 2018 | Youth Olympic Games | Buenos Aires, Argentina | 2nd | 3000 m + XC | 4 pts |
| 2021 | Olympic Games | Tokyo, Japan | 4th | 10,000 m | 27:46.16 |
| 2022 | World Indoor Championships | Belgrade, Serbia | 23 (h) | 3000 m i | 7:58.59 |
| 2022 | World Championships | Eugene, United States | 7th | 10,000 m | 27:31.00 |
| 2023 | World Cross Country Championships | Bathurst, Australia | 2nd | Senior race | 29:26 |
| 2023 | World Cross Country Championships | Bathurst, Australia | 2nd | Team | 32 pts |
| 2023 | World Championships | Budapest, Hungary | 8th | 5000 m | 13:12.99 |
| 2023 | World Championships | Budapest, Hungary | 4th | 10,000 m | 27:55.71 |
| 2024 | Olympic Games | Paris, France | 2nd | 10,000 m | 26:43.44 |
| 2025 | World Indoor Championships | Nanjing, China | 2nd | 3000 m | 7:46.25 |
| 2025 | World Championships | Tokyo, Japan | 12th | 10,000 m | 29:02.02 |

=== Personal bests ===
- 3000 metres – 7:21.28 (Chorzów 2024) NR
  - 3000 metres indoor – 7:26.20 (Karlsruhe 2022)
- 5000 metres – 12:40.45 (Lausanne 2023)
- 10000 metres – 26:31.13 (Nerja 2024)

Road

- 5 km - 12:49 (Barcelona 2021) World record
- 10 km - 26:33 (Laredo 2023)

=== Circuit wins and titles, National titles ===
- Diamond League champion 5000 metres: 2021
  - 2021: Zürich Weltklasse (5 km)
  - 2022: Eugene Prefontaine Classic (5000m, WL MR PB)
- Ethiopian Championships
  - 10,000 metres: 2021
