= 2025 Kamila Skolimowska Memorial =

Athletics meeting in Chorzów, Poland

- Dates: 15-16 August 2025
- Host city: Chorzów
- Venue: Silesian Stadium
- Level: 2025 Diamond League

The 2025 Kamila Skolimowska Memorial was the 16th edition of the annual outdoor track and field meeting in Chorzów, Poland. It will be held on 15 and 16 August at the Silesian Stadium, it was the twelfth leg of the 2025 Diamond League – the highest level international track and field circuit.

== Diamond+ events results ==
Starting in 2025 a new discipline of events was added called Diamond+, these 4 events per meet awarded athletes with increased prize money whilst keeping the standard points format to qualify for the Diamond league finals. First place earns 8 points, with each step down in place earning one less point than the previous, until no points are awarded in 9th place or lower. In the case of a tie, each tying athlete earns the full amount of points for the place.

=== Men's ===
100 metres
| Place | Athlete | Nation | Time | Points | Notes |
|---|---|---|---|---|---|
| 1st place, gold medalist(s) | Kishane Thompson | Jamaica | 9.87 | 8 | =MR |
| 2nd place, silver medalist(s) | Noah Lyles | United States | 9.90 | 7 | SB |
| 3rd place, bronze medalist(s) | Kenny Bednarek | United States | 9.96 [.952] | 6 | |
| 4 | Christian Coleman | United States | 9.96 [.958] | 5 | |
| 5 | Trayvon Bromell | United States | 9.97 | 4 | |
| 6 | Courtney Lindsey | United States | 10.05 | 3 | |
| 7 | Akani Simbine | South Africa | 10.10 | 2 | |
| 8 | Ackeem Blake | Jamaica | 10.11 | 1 | |
| 9 | Oliwer Wdowik | Poland | 10.32 | | |
| | | | Wind: (+0.3 m/s) | | |

Pole vault
| Place | Athlete | Nation | Height | Points | Notes |
|---|---|---|---|---|---|
| 1st place, gold medalist(s) | Armand Duplantis | Sweden | 6.10 m | 8 | |
| 2nd place, silver medalist(s) | Emmanouil Karalis | Greece | 6.00 m | 7 | |
| 3rd place, bronze medalist(s) | Kurtis Marschall | Australia | 5.90 m | 6 | |
| 3rd place, bronze medalist(s) | Menno Vloon | Netherlands | 5.90 m | 6 | |
| 5 | Sam Kendricks | United States | 5.80 m | 4 | |
| 6 | Renaud Lavillenie | France | 5.80 m | 3 | |
| 7 | Ben Broeders | Belgium | 5.80 m | 2 | =SB |
| 8 | Sondre Guttormsen | Norway | 5.70 m | 1 | |
| 9 | Piotr Lisek | Poland | 5.70 m | | |
| 10 | Ersu Şaşma | Turkey | 5.70 m | | |

=== Women's ===
400 metres
| Place | Athlete | Nation | Time | Points | Notes |
|---|---|---|---|---|---|
| 1st place, gold medalist(s) | Marileidy Paulino | Dominican Republic | 49.18 | 8 | |
| 2nd place, silver medalist(s) | Salwa Eid Naser | Bahrain | 49.27 | 7 | |
| 3rd place, bronze medalist(s) | Henriette Jæger | Norway | 49.83 | 6 | |
| 4 | Amber Anning | Great Britain | 50.11 | 5 | |
| 5 | Natalia Bukowiecka | Poland | 50.16 | 4 | |
| 6 | Alexis Holmes | United States | 50.18 | 3 | |
| 7 | Martina Weil | Chile | 50.28 | 2 | |
| 8 | Lieke Klaver | Netherlands | 50.53 | 1 | |
| 9 | Sada Williams | Barbados | 50.65 | | SB |

100 metres hurdles
| Place | Athlete | Nation | Time | Points | Notes |
|---|---|---|---|---|---|
| 1st place, gold medalist(s) | Masai Russell | United States | 12.19 | 8 | DLR |
| 2nd place, silver medalist(s) | Tonea Marshall | United States | 12.24 | 7 | |
| 3rd place, bronze medalist(s) | Tobi Amusan | Nigeria | 12.25 | 6 | |
| 4 | Danielle Williams | Jamaica | 12.31 | 5 | |
| 5 | Alia Armstrong | United States | 12.32 | 4 | |
| 6 | Kendra Harrison | United States | 12.41 | 3 | |
| 7 | Ackera Nugent | Jamaica | 12.43 | 2 | |
| 8 | Nadine Visser | Netherlands | 12.60 | 1 | |
| 9 | Megan Tapper | Jamaica | 12.66 | | |
| | | | Wind: (+1.4 m/s) | | |

== Diamond events results ==
=== Men's ===
1500 metres
| Place | Athlete | Nation | Time | Points | Notes |
|---|---|---|---|---|---|
| 1st place, gold medalist(s) | Yared Nuguse | United States | 3:33.19 | 8 | |
| 2nd place, silver medalist(s) | Timothy Cheruiyot | Kenya | 3:33.35 | 7 | |
| 3rd place, bronze medalist(s) | Narve Gilje Nordås | Norway | 3:33.41 | 6 | |
| 4 | Reynold Cheruiyot | Kenya | 3:33.42 | 5 | |
| 5 | Josh Hoey | United States | 3:33.75 | 4 | |
| 6 | Cameron Myers | Australia | 3:33.82 | 3 | |
| 7 | Hobbs Kessler | United States | 3:34.14 | 2 | |
| 8 | Oliver Hoare | Australia | 3:34.40 | 1 | |
| 9 | Stefan Nillessen | Netherlands | 3:34.65 | | |
| 10 | Festus Lagat | Kenya | 3:34.69 | | |
| 11 | Maciej Wyderka | Poland | 3:34.77 | | PB |
| 12 | Soufiane El Bakkali | Morocco | 3:34.84 | | |
| 13 | Neil Gourley | Great Britain | 3:34.90 | | |
| 14 | Filip Ostrowski | Poland | 3:36.08 | | SB |
| 15 | Abel Kipsang | Kenya | 3:36.18 | | |
| 16 | Filip Rak | Poland | 3:38.47 | | |
| — | Žan Rudolf | Slovenia | DNF | | PM |
| — | Patryk Sieradzki | Poland | DNF | | PM |

400 metres hurdles
| Place | Athlete | Nation | Time | Points | Notes |
|---|---|---|---|---|---|
| 1st place, gold medalist(s) | Karsten Warholm | Norway | 46.28 | 8 | DLR, WL |
| 2nd place, silver medalist(s) | Ezekiel Nathaniel | Nigeria | 47.31 | 7 | NR |
| 3rd place, bronze medalist(s) | Abderrahman Samba | Qatar | 47.34 | 6 | |
| 4 | Chris Robinson | United States | 48.09 | 5 | |
| 5 | Trevor Bassitt | United States | 48.37 | 4 | |
| 6 | Roshawn Clarke | Jamaica | 48.81 | 3 | |
| 7 | Berke Akçam | Turkey | 49.35 | 2 | |
| 8 | Patrik Dömötör | Slovakia | 49.47 | 1 | |
| 9 | Alessandro Sibilio | Italy | 50.37 | | |

High jump
| Place | Athlete | Nation | Height | Points | Notes |
|---|---|---|---|---|---|
| 1st place, gold medalist(s) | Hamish Kerr | New Zealand | 2.33 m | 8 | SB |
| 2nd place, silver medalist(s) | JuVaughn Harrison | United States | 2.28 m | 7 | SB |
| 3rd place, bronze medalist(s) | Oleh Doroshchuk | Ukraine | 2.28 m | 6 | |
| 4 | Romaine Beckford | Jamaica | 2.25 m | 5 | |
| 5 | Shelby McEwen | United States | 2.25 m | 4 | |
| 6 | Jan Štefela | Czech Republic | 2.22 m | 3 | |
| 7 | Mateusz Kołodziejski | Poland | 2.22 m | 2 | |
| 8 | Elijah Kosiba | United States | 2.22 m | 1 | |
| 9 | Naoto Hasegawa | Japan | 2.22 m | | |
| 10 | Mikołaj Szczęsny | Poland | 2.18 m | | |
| 11 | Gianmarco Tamberi | Italy | 2.14 m | | |

Shot put
| Place | Athlete | Nation | Distance | Points | Notes |
|---|---|---|---|---|---|
| 1st place, gold medalist(s) | Payton Otterdahl | United States | 22.28 m | 8 | |
| 2nd place, silver medalist(s) | Leonardo Fabbri | Italy | 22.10 m | 7 | |
| 3rd place, bronze medalist(s) | Joe Kovacs | United States | 21.82 m | 6 | |
| 4 | Tom Walsh | New Zealand | 21.72 m | 5 | |
| 5 | Adrian Piperi | United States | 21.69 m | 4 | |
| 6 | Rajindra Campbell | Jamaica | 21.58 m | 3 | |
| 7 | Chukwuebuka Enekwechi | Nigeria | 21.56 m | 2 | |
| 8 | Roger Steen | United States | 20.82 m | 1 | |
| 9 | Zane Weir | Italy | 20.19 m | | |
| 10 | Konrad Bukowiecki | Poland | 19.32 m | | |

Javelin throw
| Place | Athlete | Nation | Distance | Points | Notes |
|---|---|---|---|---|---|
| 1st place, gold medalist(s) | Julius Yego | Kenya | 83.60 m | 8 | |
| 2nd place, silver medalist(s) | Keshorn Walcott | Trinidad and Tobago | 82.54 m | 7 | |
| 3rd place, bronze medalist(s) | Andrian Mardare | Moldova | 82.38 m | 6 | SB |
| 4 | Dawid Wegner | Poland | 81.19 m | 5 | |
| 5 | Cyprian Mrzygłód | Poland | 81.10 m | 4 | |
| 6 | Anderson Peters | Grenada | 80.63 m | 3 | |
| 7 | Edis Matusevičius | Lithuania | 77.45 m | 2 | |
| 8 | Genki Dean | Japan | 67.91 m | 1 | |

=== Women's ===
100 metres
| Place | Athlete | Nation | Time | Points | Notes |
|---|---|---|---|---|---|
| 1st place, gold medalist(s) | Melissa Jefferson-Wooden | United States | 10.66 | 8 | =MR |
| 2nd place, silver medalist(s) | Tia Clayton | Jamaica | 10.82 | 7 | PB |
| 3rd place, bronze medalist(s) | Marie Josée Ta Lou-Smith | Ivory Coast | 10.87 | 6 | SB |
| 4 | Tina Clayton | Jamaica | 10.91 | 5 | |
| 5 | Jacious Sears | United States | 11.00 | 4 | |
| 6 | Sha'Carri Richardson | United States | 11.05 | 3 | SB |
| 7 | Dina Asher-Smith | Great Britain | 11.07 | 2 | |
| 8 | Ewa Swoboda | Poland | 11.08 | 1 | SB |
| 9 | Gina Lückenkemper | Germany | 11.25 | | |
| | | | Wind: (+0.1 m/s) | | |

200 metres
| Place | Athlete | Nation | Time | Points | Notes |
|---|---|---|---|---|---|
| 1st place, gold medalist(s) | Shericka Jackson | Jamaica | 22.17 | 8 | SB |
| 2nd place, silver medalist(s) | Brittany Brown | United States | 22.21 | 7 | |
| 3rd place, bronze medalist(s) | Favour Ofili | Nigeria | 22.25 | 6 | |
| 4 | Amy Hunt | Great Britain | 22.31 | 5 | |
| 5 | Daryll Neita | Great Britain | 22.44 | 4 | |
| 6 | Jaël Bestué | Spain | 22.77 | 3 | |
| 7 | Jenna Prandini | United States | 22.78 | 2 | |
| 8 | Minke Bisschops | Netherlands | 22.82 | 1 | |
| 9 | Maia McCoy | United States | 22.99 | | |
| | | | Wind: (−0.3 m/s) | | |

1500 metres
| Place | Athlete | Nation | Time | Points | Notes |
|---|---|---|---|---|---|
| 1st place, gold medalist(s) | Gudaf Tsegay | Ethiopia | 3:50.62 | 8 | MR, SB |
| 2nd place, silver medalist(s) | Beatrice Chebet | Kenya | 3:54.73 | 7 | PB |
| 3rd place, bronze medalist(s) | Georgia Hunter Bell | Great Britain | 3:56.00 | 6 | |
| 4 | Nikki Hiltz | United States | 3:56.10 | 5 | |
| 5 | Freweyni Hailu | Ethiopia | 3:56.30 | 4 | SB |
| 6 | Linden Hall | Australia | 3:56.39 | 3 | PB |
| 7 | Birke Haylom | Ethiopia | 3:56.79 | 2 | SB |
| 8 | Heather MacLean | United States | 3:57.79 | 1 | PB |
| 9 | Sarah Healy | Ireland | 3:57.95 | | |
| 10 | Marta Pérez | Spain | 3:59.02 | | SB |
| 11 | Klaudia Kazimierska | Poland | 3:59.66 | | PB |
| 12 | Weronika Lizakowska | Poland | 4:03.65 | | |
| 13 | Worknesh Mesele | Ethiopia | 4:05.32 | | |
| 14 | Sarah Billings | Australia | 4:05.78 | | |
| — | Lorea Ibarzabal | Spain | DNF | | PM |
| — | Julia Jaguścik | Poland | DNF | | PM |

400 metres hurdles
| Place | Athlete | Nation | Time | Points | Notes |
|---|---|---|---|---|---|
| 1st place, gold medalist(s) | Femke Bol | Netherlands | 51.91 | 8 | MR, WL |
| 2nd place, silver medalist(s) | Emma Zapletalová | Slovakia | 53.58 | 7 | NR |
| 3rd place, bronze medalist(s) | Jasmine Jones | United States | 53.64 | 6 | |
| 4 | Amalie Iuel | Norway | 54.38 | 5 | PB |
| 5 | Shiann Salmon | Jamaica | 54.56 | 4 | SB |
| 6 | Savannah Sutherland | Canada | 55.13 | 3 | |
| 7 | Alexandra Ștefania Uță | Romania | 56.35 | 2 | |
| 8 | Anna Gryc | Poland | 56.38 | 1 | |
| 9 | Gianna Woodruff | Panama | 58.47 | | |

Long jump
| Place | Athlete | Nation | Distance | Points | Notes |
|---|---|---|---|---|---|
| 1st place, gold medalist(s) | Jasmine Moore | United States | 6.85 m (+0.2 m/s) | 8 | MR, SB |
| 2nd place, silver medalist(s) | Hilary Kpatcha | France | 6.83 m (−1.1 m/s) | 7 | |
| 3rd place, bronze medalist(s) | Claire Bryant | United States | 6.83 m (−0.5 m/s) | 6 | |
| 4 | Malaika Mihambo | Germany | 6.68 m (+0.5 m/s) | 5 | |
| 5 | Quanesha Burks | United States | 6.65 m (−1.6 m/s) | 4 | |
| 6 | Larissa Iapichino | Italy | 6.61 m (−0.1 m/s) | 3 | |
| 7 | Ackelia Smith | Jamaica | 6.52 m (+0.3 m/s) | 2 | |
| 8 | Alexis Brown | United States | 6.52 m (+0.3 m/s) | 1 | |
| 9 | Monae' Nichols | United States | 6.21 m (−0.3 m/s) | | |

== Promotional events results ==
=== Men's ===
110 metres hurdles
| Place | Athlete | Nation | Time | Notes |
|---|---|---|---|---|
| 1st place, gold medalist(s) | Cordell Tinch | United States | 13.03 | =MR |
| 2nd place, silver medalist(s) | Grant Holloway | United States | 13.15 | |
| 3rd place, bronze medalist(s) | Eric Edwards Jr. | United States | 13.20 [.197] | =SB |
| 4 | Enzo Diessl | Austria | 13.20 [.198] | |
| 5 | Orlando Bennett | Jamaica | 13.25 | |
| 6 | Hansle Parchment | Jamaica | 13.27 | |
| 7 | Jakub Szymański | Poland | 13.28 | SB |
| 8 | Romain Lecoeur | France | 13.55 | |
| — | Lorenzo Simonelli | Italy | DQ | TR 22.6 |
| | | | Wind: (−0.5 m/s) | |

Hammer throw
| Place | Athlete | Nation | Distance | Notes |
|---|---|---|---|---|
| 1st place, gold medalist(s) | Bence Halász | Hungary | 81.77 m | |
| 2nd place, silver medalist(s) | Ethan Katzberg | Canada | 79.30 m | |
| 3rd place, bronze medalist(s) | Merlin Hummel | Germany | 79.16 m | |
| 4 | Mykhaylo Kokhan | Ukraine | 77.98 m | |
| 5 | Yann Chaussinand | France | 77.94 m | |
| 6 | Paweł Fajdek | Poland | 76.84 m | |

=== Women's ===
800 metres
| Place | Athlete | Nation | Time | Notes |
|---|---|---|---|---|
| 1st place, gold medalist(s) | Keely Hodgkinson | Great Britain | 1:54.74 | MR, WL |
| 2nd place, silver medalist(s) | Lilian Odira | Kenya | 1:56.52 | PB |
| 3rd place, bronze medalist(s) | Oratile Nowe | Botswana | 1:56.76 | NR |
| 4 | Raevyn Rogers | United States | 1:57.52 | SB |
| 5 | Claudia Hollingsworth | Australia | 1:57.67 | AR |
| 6 | Abbey Caldwell | Australia | 1:57.70 | PB |
| 7 | Clara Liberman | France | 1:58.82 | PB |
| 8 | Angelika Sarna | Poland | 1:59.08 | PB |
| 9 | Margarita Koczanowa | Poland | 1:59.90 | PB |
| 10 | Catriona Bisset | Australia | 2:00.64 | SB |
| 11 | Gabriela Gajanová | Slovakia | 2:01.17 | |
| 12 | Anna Wielgosz | Poland | 2:01.60 | |
| — | Lisanne de Witte | Netherlands | DNF | PM |

3000 metres
| Place | Athlete | Nation | Time | Notes |
|---|---|---|---|---|
| 1st place, gold medalist(s) | Faith Kipyegon | Kenya | 8:07.04 | AR, DLR, WL |
| 2nd place, silver medalist(s) | Likina Amebaw | Ethiopia | 8:34.53 | |
| 3rd place, bronze medalist(s) | Aleshign Baweke | Ethiopia | 8:35.51 | |
| 4 | Rose Davies | Australia | 8:36.53 | SB |
| 5 | Maureen Koster | Netherlands | 8:36.71 | |
| 6 | Lauren Ryan | Australia | 8:37.56 | PB |
| 7 | Georgia Griffith | Australia | 8:40.08 | |
| 8 | Axumawit Embaye | Ethiopia | 8:40.20 | PB |
| 9 | Karissa Schweizer | United States | 8:40.35 | |
| 10 | Marta Alemayo | Ethiopia | 8:41.48 | |
| 11 | Ella Donaghu | United States | 8:42.91 | |
| 12 | Mekedes Alemeshete | Ethiopia | 8:42.93 | SB |
| 13 | Nozomi Tanaka | Japan | 8:45.80 | |
| 14 | Alexandra Millard | Great Britain | 8:46.27 | |
| 15 | Charity Cherop | Uganda | 8:49.96 | NU20R |
| 16 | Diane van Es | Netherlands | 8:51.10 | |
| 17 | Eloise Walker | Great Britain | 8:52.46 | |
| — | Jessica Hull | Australia | DNF | PM |
| — | Sage Hurta-Klecker | United States | DNF | PM |

High jump
| Place | Athlete | Nation | Height | Notes |
|---|---|---|---|---|
| 1st place, gold medalist(s) | Yaroslava Mahuchikh | Ukraine | 2.00 m | MR |
| 2nd place, silver medalist(s) | Nicola Olyslagers | Australia | 1.97 m | |
| 3rd place, bronze medalist(s) | Imke Onnen | Germany | 1.91 m | |
| 4 | Michaela Hrubá | Czech Republic | 1.88 m | |
| 5 | Charity Hufnagel | United States | 1.88 m | |
| 6 | Kateryna Tabashnyk | Ukraine | 1.88 m | |
| 7 | Ona Bonet | Spain | 1.84 m | |
| 7 | Elisabeth Pihela | Estonia | 1.84 m | |
| 9 | Emma Gates | United States | 1.84 m | |
| 10 | Paulina Borys | Poland | 1.80 m | |

Pole vault
| Place | Athlete | Nation | Height | Notes |
|---|---|---|---|---|
| 1st place, gold medalist(s) | Marie-Julie Bonnin | France | 4.70 m | |
| 2nd place, silver medalist(s) | Hanga Klekner | Hungary | 4.60 m | =NR |
| 3rd place, bronze medalist(s) | Brynn King | United States | 4.60 m | |
| 4 | Hana Moll | United States | 4.60 m | |
| 5 | Elien Vekemans | Belgium | 4.50 m | |
| 6 | Marleen Mülla | Estonia | 4.50 m | |
| 7 | Chloe Timberg | United States | 4.50 m | |
| 8 | Amanda Moll | United States | 4.50 m | |
| 9 | Gabriela Leon | United States | 4.40 m | |
| 10 | Allika Inkeri Moser | Estonia | 4.30 m | |
| 11 | Zofia Gaborska | Poland | 4.30 m | |
| 12 | Johanna Duplantis | Sweden | 4.10 m | |

Shot put
| Place | Athlete | Nation | Distance | Notes |
|---|---|---|---|---|
| 1st place, gold medalist(s) | Jessica Schilder | Netherlands | 19.66 m | |
| 2nd place, silver medalist(s) | Yemisi Ogunleye | Germany | 19.50 m | |
| 3rd place, bronze medalist(s) | Maggie Ewen | United States | 19.49 m | |
| 4 | Fanny Roos | Sweden | 19.43 m | |
| 5 | Danniel Thomas-Dodd | Jamaica | 19.19 m | |
| 6 | Axelina Johansson | Sweden | 18.68 m | |
| 7 | Abby Moore | United States | 18.22 m | |
| 8 | Sara Lennman | Sweden | 17.27 m | |

Hammer throw
| Place | Athlete | Nation | Distance | Notes |
|---|---|---|---|---|
| 1st place, gold medalist(s) | Camryn Rogers | Canada | 75.39 m | |
| 2nd place, silver medalist(s) | Krista Tervo | Finland | 72.74 m | |
| 3rd place, bronze medalist(s) | Silja Kosonen | Finland | 72.40 m | |
| 4 | Rachel Richeson | United States | 71.70 m | |
| 5 | Brooke Andersen | United States | 69.99 m | |
| 6 | Katarzyna Furmanek | Poland | 65.50 m | |

== See also ==
- 2025 Diamond League
