= 2023 Kamila Skolimowska Memorial =

2023 athletics meeting in Poland

- Dates: 16 July 2023
- Host city: Chorzów, Poland
- Venue: Stadion Śląski
- Level: 2023 Diamond League

The 2023 Kamila Skolimowska Memorial was the 14th edition of the annual outdoor track and field meeting in Chorzów, Poland. Held on 16 July at the Silesian Stadium, it was the 8th leg of the 2023 Diamond League.

The meeting was highlighted by reigning Olympic champion Jakob Ingebrigtsen running a 3:27.14 personal best to win the 1500 metres. In addition, Sha'Carri Richardson won an anticipated race against Shericka Jackson, maintaining a perfect season in the 100 m after winning the 2023 Doha Diamond League earlier in the year.

== Results ==
=== Diamond Discipline ===
Men's 100m (±0.0 m/s)
Place	Athlete	Country	Time	Points
1st place, gold medalist(s)	Akani Simbine	South Africa	9.97	8
2nd place, silver medalist(s)	Fred Kerley	United States	9.98	7
3rd place, bronze medalist(s)	Emmanuel Eseme	Cameroon	9.98	6
4	Cravont Charleston	United States	9.99	5
5	Yohan Blake	Jamaica	10.01	4
6	Ackeem Blake	Jamaica	10.15	2
7	Pjai Austin	United States	10.23	1
8	Jeremiah Azu	Great Britain	10.31	
	Marvin Bracy	United States	~~10.10~~ DSQ	~~3~~

Men's 400m
Place	Athlete	Country	Time	Points
1st place, gold medalist(s)	Wayde van Niekerk	South Africa	44.08	8
2nd place, silver medalist(s)	Bayapo Ndori	Botswana	44.61	7
3rd place, bronze medalist(s)	Alison dos Santos	Brazil	44.73	6
4	Zakithi Nene	South Africa	44.74	5
5	Ryan Willie	United States	44.77	4
6	Bryce Deadmon	United States	44.81	3
7	Vernon Norwood	United States	44.88	2
8	Karol Zalewski	Poland	45.87	1
	Muzala Samukonga	Zambia	DNF	

Men's 1500m
Place	Athlete	Country	Time	Points
1st place, gold medalist(s)	Jakob Ingebrigtsen	Norway	3:27.14	8
2nd place, silver medalist(s)	Abel Kipsang	Kenya	3:29.11	7
3rd place, bronze medalist(s)	Reynold Cheruiyot	Kenya	3:30.30	6
4	Andrew Coscoran	Ireland	3:30.42	5
5	Sam Tanner	New Zealand	3:31.24	4
6	Vincent Kibet Keter	Kenya	3:31.28	3
7	Isaac Nader	Portugal	3:31.49	2
8	George Mills	Great Britain	3:31.54	1
9	Azeddine Habz	France	3:31.61	
10	Elliot Giles	Great Britain	3:33.00	
11	Cameron Myers	Australia	3:33.26	
12	Charles Philibert-Thiboutot	Canada	3:33.29	
13	Adrián Ben	Spain	3:33.50	
14	Sam Prakel	United States	3:40.09	
	Stewart McSweyn	Australia	DNF	
	Erik Sowinski	United States	DNF	
	Mounir Akbache	France	DNF	

Men's 3000mSC
Place	Athlete	Country	Time	Points
1st place, gold medalist(s)	Soufiane El Bakkali	Morocco	8:03.16	8
2nd place, silver medalist(s)	Abraham Kibiwot	Kenya	8:08.03	7
3rd place, bronze medalist(s)	Leonard Bett	Kenya	8:09.45	6
4	Abrham Sime	Ethiopia	8:10.68	5
5	Benjamin Kigen	Kenya	8:11.12	4
6	Avinash Sable	India	8:11.63	3
7	Amos Serem	Kenya	8:14.53	2
8	Mohamed Tindouft	Morocco	8:15.02	1
9	Hailemariyam Amare	Ethiopia	8:25.10	
10	Amos Kirui	Kenya	8:26.17	
11	Niklas Buchholz	Germany	8:30.01	
12	Fernando Carro	Spain	8:33.59	
13	El Mehdi Aboujanah	Spain	8:33.90	
14	Mohamed Amin Jhinaoui	Tunisia	8:40.84	
	Mohammed Msaad	Morocco	DNF	
	Getnet Wale	Ethiopia	DNF	
	Abderrafia Bouassel	Morocco	DNF	

Men's High Jump
Place	Athlete	Country	Mark	Points
1st place, gold medalist(s)	Mutaz Barsham	Qatar	2.36 m	8
2nd place, silver medalist(s)	Gianmarco Tamberi	Italy	2.34 m	7
3rd place, bronze medalist(s)	Tobias Potye	Germany	2.34 m	6
4	Brandon Starc	Australia	2.27 m	5
5	Norbert Kobielski	Poland	2.27 m	4
6	Luis Zayas	Cuba	2.27 m	3
7	Donald Thomas	Bahamas	2.27 m	2
8	Hamish Kerr	New Zealand	2.24 m	1
9	Thomas Carmoy	Belgium	2.20 m	
10	Andriy Protsenko	Ukraine	2.20 m	

Men's Pole Vault
Place	Athlete	Country	Mark	Points
1st place, gold medalist(s)	Armand Duplantis	Sweden	6.01 m	8
2nd place, silver medalist(s)	Sam Kendricks	United States	5.91 m	7
3rd place, bronze medalist(s)	Chris Nilsen	United States	5.81 m	6
4	Piotr Lisek	Poland	5.71 m	5
5	Bo Kanda Lita Baehre	Germany	5.71 m	4
6	Thiago Braz	Brazil	5.71 m	3
7	Kurtis Marschall	Australia	5.71 m	2
8	Zach McWhorter	United States	5.71 m	1
9	Sondre Guttormsen	Norway	5.41 m	
10	Menno Vloon	Netherlands	5.41 m	

Men's Shot Put
Place	Athlete	Country	Mark	Points
1st place, gold medalist(s)	Ryan Crouser	United States	22.55 m	8
2nd place, silver medalist(s)	Payton Otterdahl	United States	21.88 m	7
3rd place, bronze medalist(s)	Tom Walsh	New Zealand	21.78 m	6
4	Filip Mihaljević	Croatia	21.63 m	5
5	Josh Awotunde	United States	21.61 m	4
6	Jacko Gill	New Zealand	21.38 m	3
7	Joe Kovacs	United States	20.88 m	2
8	Leonardo Fabbri	Italy	20.21 m	1
	Michał Haratyk	Poland	NM	
	Tomáš Staněk	Czech Republic	NM	

Women's 100m (+0.2 m/s)
Place	Athlete	Country	Time	Points
1st place, gold medalist(s)	Sha'Carri Richardson	United States	10.76	8
2nd place, silver medalist(s)	Shericka Jackson	Jamaica	10.78	7
3rd place, bronze medalist(s)	Ewa Swoboda	Poland	10.94	6
4	Twanisha Terry	United States	10.99	5
5	Daryll Neita	Great Britain	11.01	4
6	Anthonique Strachan	Bahamas	11.05	3
7	Gina Lückenkemper	Germany	11.09	2
8	Zoe Hobbs	New Zealand	11.15	1
9	Shashalee Forbes	Jamaica	11.18	

Women's 400m
Place	Athlete	Country	Time	Points
1st place, gold medalist(s)	Natalia Kaczmarek	Poland	49.48	8
2nd place, silver medalist(s)	Lieke Klaver	Netherlands	49.81	7
3rd place, bronze medalist(s)	Marileidy Paulino	Dominican Republic	50.00	6
4	Candice McLeod	Jamaica	50.19	5
5	Sada Williams	Barbados	50.34	4
6	Victoria Ohuruogu	Great Britain	50.48	3
7	Lynna Irby	United States	50.92	2
8	Martina Weil	Chile	51.07	1

Women's 800m
Place	Athlete	Country	Time	Points
1st place, gold medalist(s)	Mary Moraa	Kenya	1:56.85	8
2nd place, silver medalist(s)	Halimah Nakaayi	Uganda	1:57.78	7
3rd place, bronze medalist(s)	Natoya Goule	Jamaica	1:57.90	6
4	Sage Hurta	United States	1:58.09	5
5	Abbey Caldwell	Australia	1:58.48	4
6	Anita Horvat	Slovenia	1:58.94	3
7	Rénelle Lamote	France	1:59.30	2
8	Sofia Ennaoui	Poland	1:59.82	1
9	Elena Bellò	Italy	2:00.61	
10	Camille Laus	Belgium	2:01.35	
11	Margarita Koczanowa	Poland	2:02.09	
	Aneta Lemiesz	Poland	DNF	
	Catriona Bisset	Australia	DNF	

Women's 3000m
Place	Athlete	Country	Time	Points
1st place, gold medalist(s)	Freweyni Hailu	Ethiopia	8:26.61	8
2nd place, silver medalist(s)	Lilian Kasait Rengeruk	Kenya	8:27.80	7
3rd place, bronze medalist(s)	Lemlem Hailu	Ethiopia	8:29.43	6
4	Teresia Muthoni Gateri	Kenya	8:29.48	5
5	Margaret Akidor	Kenya	8:31.45	4
6	Sarah Chelangat	Uganda	8:35.82	3
7	Agate Caune	Latvia	8:39.78	2
8	Mekedes Alemeshete	Ethiopia	8:41.57	1
9	Elly Henes	United States	8:42.81	
10	Joselyn Brea	Venezuela	8:43.26	
11	Aimee Pratt	Great Britain	8:44.15	
12	Viktória Wagner-Gyürkés	Hungary	8:50.40	
13	Lemlem Nibret	Ethiopia	8:50.95	
14	Klara Lukan	Slovenia	8:51.45	
15	Lauren Ryan	Australia	9:06.70	
16	Tigist Gezahagn	Ethiopia	9:06.89	
	Kinga Królik	Poland	DNF	

Women's 100mH (+0.9 m/s)
Place	Athlete	Country	Time	Points
1st place, gold medalist(s)	Tobi Amusan	Nigeria	12.34	8
2nd place, silver medalist(s)	Kendra Harrison	United States	12.35	7
3rd place, bronze medalist(s)	Nia Ali	United States	12.38	6
4	Megan Tapper	Jamaica	12.49	5
5	Danielle Williams	Jamaica	12.55	4
6	Tia Jones	United States	12.57	3
7	Alaysha Johnson	United States	12.58	2
8	Pia Skrzyszowska	Poland	12.67	1
9	Marione Fourie	South Africa	12.73	

Women's High Jump
Place	Athlete	Country	Mark	Points
1st place, gold medalist(s)	Iryna Herashchenko	Ukraine	1.98 m	8
2nd place, silver medalist(s)	Nicola Olyslagers	Australia	1.98 m	7
3rd place, bronze medalist(s)	Yuliya Levchenko	Ukraine	1.98 m	6
4	Angelina Topić	Serbia	1.95 m	5
5	Morgan Lake	Great Britain	1.92 m	4
6	Lamara Distin	Jamaica	1.89 m	3
7	Nadezhda Dubovitskaya	Kazakhstan	1.89 m	2
8	Kateryna Tabashnyk	Ukraine	1.89 m	1
9	Eleanor Patterson	Australia	1.89 m	

Women's Triple Jump
Place	Athlete	Country	Mark	Points
1st place, gold medalist(s)	Yulimar Rojas	Venezuela	15.18 m (+0.3 m/s)	8
2nd place, silver medalist(s)	Maryna Bekh-Romanchuk	Ukraine	14.70 m (+0.3 m/s)	7
3rd place, bronze medalist(s)	Leyanis Pérez	Cuba	14.67 m (+0.5 m/s)	6
4	Liadagmis Povea	Cuba	14.62 m (−0.3 m/s)	5
5	Shanieka Ricketts	Jamaica	14.56 m (+0.1 m/s)	4
6	Thea LaFond	Dominica	14.43 m (+0.3 m/s)	3
7	Keturah Orji	United States	14.06 m (+0.3 m/s)	2
8	Tori Franklin	United States	13.49 m (+0.5 m/s)	1

Women's Javelin Throw
Place	Athlete	Country	Mark	Points
1st place, gold medalist(s)	Haruka Kitaguchi	Japan	67.04 m	8
2nd place, silver medalist(s)	Mackenzie Little	Australia	64.50 m	7
3rd place, bronze medalist(s)	Tori Peeters	New Zealand	62.73 m	6
4	Nikola Ogrodníková	Czech Republic	60.55 m	5
5	Liveta Jasiūnaitė	Lithuania	60.43 m	4
6	Sigrid Borge	Norway	60.31 m	3
7	Kelsey-Lee Barber	Australia	59.02 m	2
8	Adriana Vilagoš	Serbia	56.88 m	1

=== Promotional events ===
Men's Hammer Throw
Place	Athlete	Country	Mark
1st place, gold medalist(s)	Wojciech Nowicki	Poland	80.02 m
2nd place, silver medalist(s)	Rudy Winkler	United States	78.11 m
3rd place, bronze medalist(s)	Eivind Henriksen	Norway	76.75 m
4	Christos Frantzeskakis	Greece	74.80 m
5	Paweł Fajdek	Poland	73.93 m

Women's Hammer Throw
Place	Athlete	Country	Mark
1st place, gold medalist(s)	Brooke Andersen	United States	75.40 m
2nd place, silver medalist(s)	Janee' Kassanavoid	United States	74.27 m
3rd place, bronze medalist(s)	Sara Fantini	Italy	72.96 m
4	Bianca Ghelber	Romania	70.89 m
5	Malwina Kopron	Poland	68.73 m

Men's 110mH (−0.2 m/s)
Place	Athlete	Country	Time
1st place, gold medalist(s)	Roger Iribarne	Cuba	13.25
2nd place, silver medalist(s)	Just Kwaou-Mathey	France	13.26
3rd place, bronze medalist(s)	Tyler Mason	Jamaica	13.29
4	Trey Cunningham	United States	13.36
5	Joshua Zeller	Great Britain	13.43
6	Eric Edwards Jr.	United States	13.54
7	Daniel Roberts	United States	13.90
	Robert Dunning	United States	DNS
	Milan Trajkovic	Cyprus	DQ

Men's 110mH Round 1
Place	Athlete	Country	Time	Heat
1	Roger Iribarne	Cuba	13.21	1
2	Daniel Roberts	United States	13.24	2
3	Just Kwaou-Mathey	France	13.27	1
4	Tyler Mason	Jamaica	13.28	2
5	Trey Cunningham	United States	13.31	1
6	Milan Trajkovic	Cyprus	13.34	2
7	Eric Edwards Jr.	United States	13.36	1
8	Robert Dunning	United States	13.38	1
9	Joshua Zeller	Great Britain	13.40	1
10	Antonio Alkana	South Africa	13.44	1
11	Aurel Manga	France	13.45	2
12	Rafael Pereira	Brazil	13.50	2
13	Damion Thomas	Jamaica	13.53	1
14	Michael Dickson	United States	13.57	2
15	Pascal Martinot-Lagarde	France	13.59	2
16	Shuhei Ishikawa	Japan	13.64	2
17	Damian Czykier	Poland	13.65	1

Women's 1500m
Place	Athlete	Country	Time
1st place, gold medalist(s)	Hirut Meshesha	Ethiopia	3:54.87
2nd place, silver medalist(s)	Birke Haylom	Ethiopia	3:54.93
3rd place, bronze medalist(s)	Diribe Welteji	Ethiopia	3:55.08
4	Worknesh Mesele	Ethiopia	3:57.00
5	Linden Hall	Australia	3:57.27
6	Melissa Courtney-Bryant	Great Britain	3:58.01
7	Jemma Reekie	Great Britain	3:58.65
8	Gaia Sabbatini	Italy	4:01.24
9	Katharina Trost	Germany	4:02.32
10	Kristiina Mäki	Czech Republic	4:03.27
11	Claudia Bobocea	Romania	4:03.80
12	Agathe Guillemot	France	4:05.89
13	Erin Wallace	Great Britain	4:06.29
14	Eliza Megger	Poland	4:08.66
15	Weronika Lizakowska	Poland	4:14.86
	Lydia Jeruto Lagat	Kenya	DNF
