= 2024 Kamila Skolimowska Memorial =

2024 athletics meeting in Poland

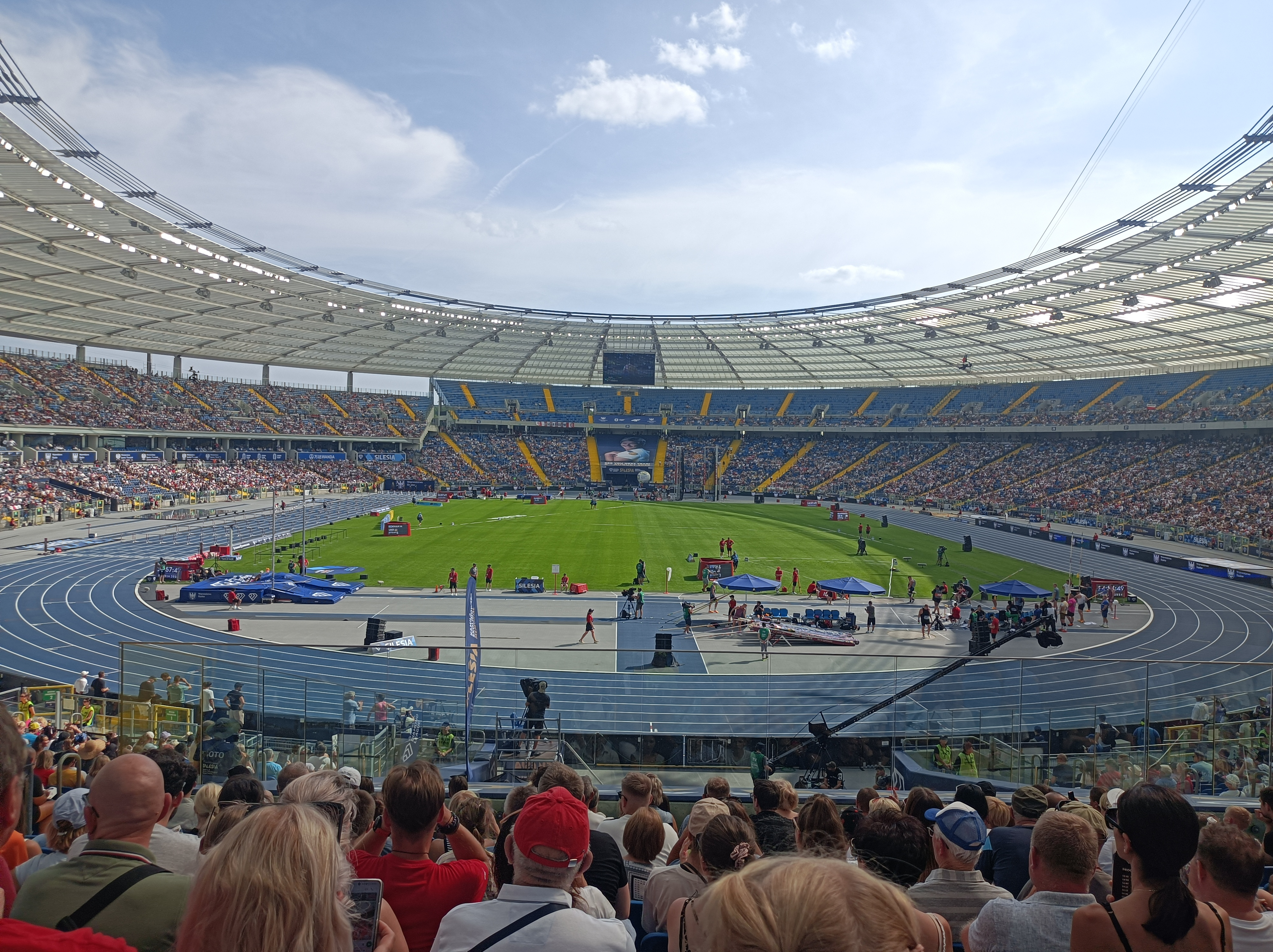
- Dates: 25 August 2024
- Host city: Chorzów, Poland
- Venue: Silesian Stadium
- Level: 2024 Diamond League

The 2024 Kamila Skolimowska Memorial was the 15th edition of the annual outdoor track and field meeting in Chorzów, Poland. Held on 25 August at the Silesian Stadium, it was the 12th leg of the 2024 Diamond League.

== Highlights ==
At the meeting, Jakob Ingebrigtsen broke Daniel Komen's 3000 m world record, running 7:17.55 to eclipse Komen's 7:20.67 mark from 1996. In addition, Armand Duplantis broke his own pole vault world record, jumping 6.26 m.

== Results ==
Athletes competing in the Diamond League disciplines earned extra compensation and points which went towards qualifying for the 2024 Diamond League finals. First place earned 8 points, with each step down in place earning one less point than the previous, until no points are awarded in 9th place or lower. In the case of a tie, each tying athlete earns the full amount of points for the place.

=== Diamond Discipline ===
Men's 200 Metres (+0.6 m/s)
| Place | Athlete | Age | Country | Time | Points |
|---|---|---|---|---|---|
| 1st place, gold medalist(s) | Letsile Tebogo | 21 | Botswana | 19.83 | 8 |
| 2nd place, silver medalist(s) | Alexander Ogando | 24 | Dominican Republic | 19.86 | 7 |
| 3rd place, bronze medalist(s) | Kenny Bednarek | 25 | United States | 20.00 | 6 |
| 4 | Erriyon Knighton | 20 | United States | 20.07 | 5 |
| 5 | Kyree King | 30 | United States | 20.27 | 4 |
| 6 | Joseph Fahnbulleh | 22 | Liberia | 20.39 | 3 |
| 7 | Shaun Maswanganyi | 23 | South Africa | 20.55 | 2 |
| 8 | Fausto Desalu | 30 | Italy | 20.62 | 1 |
| 9 | Albert Komański | 24 | Poland | 21.07 | |

Men's 800 Metres
| Place | Athlete | Age | Country | Time | Points |
|---|---|---|---|---|---|
| 1st place, gold medalist(s) | Marco Arop | 25 | Canada | 1:41.86 | 8 |
| 2nd place, silver medalist(s) | Emmanuel Wanyonyi | 20 | Kenya | 1:43.23 | 7 |
| 3rd place, bronze medalist(s) | Bryce Hoppel | 26 | United States | 1:43.32 | 6 |
| 4 | Eliott Crestan | 25 | Belgium | 1:43.48 | 5 |
| 5 | Wyclife Kinyamal | 27 | Kenya | 1:43.54 | 4 |
| 6 | Gabriel Tual | 26 | France | 1:43.73 | 3 |
| 7 | Max Burgin | 22 | Great Britain | 1:43.73 | 2 |
| 8 | Hobbs Kessler | 21 | United States | 1:43.97 | 1 |
| 9 | Andreas Kramer | 27 | Sweden | 1:44.32 | |
| 10 | Aaron Cheminingwa | 26 | Kenya | 1:44.60 | |
| 11 | Mohamed Attaoui | 22 | Spain | 1:44.96 | |
| 12 | Bartosz Kitliński | 20 | Poland | 1:45.56 | |
| | Patryk Sieradzki | 25 | Poland | DNF | |

Men's 3000 Metres
| Place | Athlete | Age | Country | Time | Points |
|---|---|---|---|---|---|
| 1st place, gold medalist(s) | Jakob Ingebrigtsen | 23 | Norway | 7:17.55 | 8 |
| 2nd place, silver medalist(s) | Berihu Aregawi | 23 | Ethiopia | 7:21.28 | 7 |
| 3rd place, bronze medalist(s) | Yomif Kejelcha | 27 | Ethiopia | 7:28.44 | 6 |
| 4 | Telahun Haile Bekele | 25 | Ethiopia | 7:30.97 | 5 |
| 5 | Ronald Kwemoi | 28 | Kenya | 7:31.57 | 4 |
| 6 | Mohammed Ahmed | 33 | Canada | 7:31.96 | 3 |
| 7 | Selemon Barega | 24 | Ethiopia | 7:32.49 | 2 |
| 8 | Adriaan Wildschutt | 26 | South Africa | 7:32.99 | 1 |
| 9 | Nicholas Kimeli | 25 | Kenya | 7:33.46 | |
| 10 | Addisu Yihune | 21 | Ethiopia | 7:33.94 | |
| 11 | Mike Foppen | 27 | Netherlands | 7:34.47 | |
| 12 | Nick Griggs | 19 | Ireland | 7:39.52 | |
| 13 | Stewart McSweyn | 29 | Australia | 7:40.24 | |
| 14 | Sean McGorty | 29 | United States | 7:42.15 | |
| 15 | Grant Fisher | 27 | United States | 7:49.79 | |
| | Vincent Ciattei | 29 | United States | DNF | |
| | Filip Rak | 21 | Poland | DNF | |
| | Pieter Sisk | 24 | Belgium | DNF | |

Men's 3000 Metres Steeplechase
| Place | Athlete | Age | Country | Time | Points |
|---|---|---|---|---|---|
| 1st place, gold medalist(s) | Soufiane El Bakkali | 28 | Morocco | 8:04.29 | 8 |
| 2nd place, silver medalist(s) | Amos Serem | 21 | Kenya | 8:04.29 | 7 |
| 3rd place, bronze medalist(s) | Samuel Firewu | 20 | Ethiopia | 8:04.34 | 6 |
| 4 | Abraham Kibiwot | 28 | Kenya | 8:08.21 | 5 |
| 5 | Daniel Arce | 32 | Spain | 8:08.45 | 4 |
| 6 | Mohamed Amin Jhinaoui | 27 | Tunisia | 8:14.15 | 3 |
| 7 | Ahmed Jaziri | 26 | Tunisia | 8:14.79 | 2 |
| 8 | Samuel Duguna | 20 | Ethiopia | 8:16.64 | 1 |
| 9 | Karl Bebendorf | 28 | Germany | 8:17.52 | |
| 10 | Djilali Bedrani | 30 | France | 8:19.10 | |
| 11 | Getnet Wale | 24 | Ethiopia | 8:21.26 | |
| 12 | Jean-Simon Desgagnés | 26 | Canada | 8:23.28 | |
| 13 | Mohamed Tindouft | 31 | Morocco | 8:26.24 | |
| 14 | Avinash Sable | 29 | India | 8:29.96 | |
| 15 | Frederik Ruppert | 27 | Germany | 8:31.06 | |
| 16 | Kenneth Rooks | 24 | United States | 8:35.19 | |
| 17 | Matthew Wilkinson | 25 | United States | 8:40.35 | |
| | Abderrafia Bouassel | 23 | Morocco | DNF | |
| | Wilberforce Chemiat Kones | 30 | Kenya | DNF | |
| | Abrham Sime | 22 | Ethiopia | DNF | |

Men's High Jump
| Place | Athlete | Age | Country | Mark | Points |
|---|---|---|---|---|---|
| 1st place, gold medalist(s) | Gianmarco Tamberi | 32 | Italy | 2.31 m | 8 |
| 2nd place, silver medalist(s) | Romaine Beckford | 22 | Jamaica | 2.29 m | 7 |
| 3rd place, bronze medalist(s) | Oleh Doroshchuk | 23 | Ukraine | 2.29 m | 6 |
| 4 | Woo Sang-hyeok | 28 | South Korea | 2.29 m | 5 |
| 5 | Erik Portillo | 23 | Mexico | 2.22 m | 4 |
| 6 | Brian Raats | 20 | South Africa | 2.22 m | 3 |
| 7 | Tihomir Ivanov | 30 | Bulgaria | 2.22 m | 2 |
| 7 | Stefano Sottile | 26 | Italy | 2.22 m | 2 |
| 9 | Hamish Kerr | 28 | New Zealand | 2.18 m | |
| 10 | Tomohiro Shinno | 28 | Japan | 2.18 m | |
| 11 | Jan Štefela | 23 | Czech Republic | 2.14 m | |

Men's Pole Vault
| Place | Athlete | Age | Country | Mark | Points |
|---|---|---|---|---|---|
| 1st place, gold medalist(s) | Armand Duplantis | 24 | Sweden | 6.26 m | 8 |
| 2nd place, silver medalist(s) | Sam Kendricks | 31 | United States | 6.00 m | 7 |
| 3rd place, bronze medalist(s) | Emmanouil Karalis | 24 | Greece | 6.00 m | 6 |
| 4 | KC Lightfoot | 24 | United States | 5.92 m | 5 |
| 5 | EJ Obiena | 28 | Philippines | 5.82 m | 4 |
| 6 | Chris Nilsen | 26 | United States | 5.72 m | 3 |
| 7 | Kurtis Marschall | 27 | Australia | 5.72 m | 2 |
| 8 | Thibaut Collet | 25 | France | 5.72 m | 1 |
| 8 | Piotr Lisek | 32 | Poland | 5.72 m | 1 |
| 10 | Renaud Lavillenie | 37 | France | 5.62 m | |
| 11 | Robert Sobera | 33 | Poland | 5.62 m | |

Men's Shot Put
| Place | Athlete | Age | Country | Mark | Points |
|---|---|---|---|---|---|
| 1st place, gold medalist(s) | Joe Kovacs | 35 | United States | 22.14 m | 8 |
| 2nd place, silver medalist(s) | Ryan Crouser | 31 | United States | 22.12 m | 7 |
| 3rd place, bronze medalist(s) | Leonardo Fabbri | 27 | Italy | 22.03 m | 6 |
| 4 | Payton Otterdahl | 28 | United States | 20.95 m | 5 |
| 5 | Chukwuebuka Enekwechi | 31 | Nigeria | 20.93 m | 4 |
| 6 | Marcus Thomsen | 26 | Norway | 20.90 m | 3 |
| 7 | Jacko Gill | 29 | New Zealand | 20.89 m | 2 |
| 8 | Rajindra Campbell | 28 | Jamaica | 20.78 m | 1 |
| 9 | Roger Steen | 32 | United States | 20.47 m | |
| 10 | Jordan Geist | 26 | United States | 20.45 m | |
| 11 | Konrad Bukowiecki | 27 | Poland | 19.88 m | |
| | Michał Haratyk | 32 | Poland | NM | |

Women's 100 Metres (+2.9 m/s)
| Place | Athlete | Age | Country | Time | Points |
|---|---|---|---|---|---|
| 1st place, gold medalist(s) | Tia Clayton | 20 | Jamaica | 10.83 | 8 |
| 2nd place, silver medalist(s) | Marie Josée Ta Lou-Smith | 35 | Ivory Coast | 10.83 | 7 |
| 3rd place, bronze medalist(s) | Tamari Davis | 21 | United States | 10.84 | 6 |
| 4 | Daryll Neita | 27 | Great Britain | 11.01 | 5 |
| 5 | Patrizia van der Weken | 24 | Luxembourg | 11.03 | 4 |
| 6 | Ewa Swoboda | 27 | Poland | 11.03 | 3 |
| 7 | Gina Mariam Bass Bittaye | 29 | Gambia | 11.05 | 2 |
| 8 | Jenna Prandini | 31 | United States | 11.07 | 1 |
| 9 | Natasha Morrison | 31 | Jamaica | 11.07 | |

Women's 400 Metres
| Place | Athlete | Age | Country | Time | Points |
|---|---|---|---|---|---|
| 1st place, gold medalist(s) | Marileidy Paulino | 27 | Dominican Republic | 48.66 | 8 |
| 2nd place, silver medalist(s) | Salwa Eid Naser | 26 | Bahrain | 49.23 | 7 |
| 3rd place, bronze medalist(s) | Natalia Kaczmarek | 26 | Poland | 49.95 | 6 |
| 4 | Rhasidat Adeleke | 21 | Ireland | 50.00 | 5 |
| 5 | Alexis Holmes | 24 | United States | 50.01 | 4 |
| 6 | Henriette Jæger | 21 | Norway | 50.33 | 3 |
| 7 | Lieke Klaver | 26 | Netherlands | 50.46 | 2 |
| 8 | Sada Williams | 26 | Barbados | 50.82 | 1 |
| 9 | Laviai Nielsen | 28 | Great Britain | 51.02 | |

Women's 1500 Metres
| Place | Athlete | Age | Country | Time | Points |
|---|---|---|---|---|---|
| 1st place, gold medalist(s) | Diribe Welteji | 22 | Ethiopia | 3:57.08 | 8 |
| 2nd place, silver medalist(s) | Freweyni Hailu | 23 | Ethiopia | 3:57.88 | 7 |
| 3rd place, bronze medalist(s) | Georgia Bell | 30 | Great Britain | 3:58.11 | 6 |
| 4 | Melissa Courtney-Bryant | 30 | Great Britain | 3:59.55 | 5 |
| 5 | Sarah Healy | 23 | Ireland | 3:59.65 | 4 |
| 6 | Klaudia Kazimierska | 22 | Poland | 3:59.95 | 3 |
| 7 | Susan Ejore | 28 | Kenya | 3:59.97 | 2 |
| 8 | Nozomi Tanaka | 24 | Japan | 4:00.34 | 1 |
| 9 | Sarah Billings | 26 | Australia | 4:00.41 | |
| 10 | Revée Walcott-Nolan | 29 | Great Britain | 4:00.41 | |
| 11 | Marta Pérez | 31 | Spain | 4:01.48 | |
| 12 | Linden Hall | 33 | Australia | 4:02.35 | |
| 13 | Cory McGee | 32 | United States | 4:02.79 | |
| | Lorea Ibarzabal | 29 | Spain | DNF | |
| | Aleksandra Płocińska | 24 | Poland | DNF | |
| | Kristiina Mäki | 32 | Czech Republic | DNF | |

Women's 100 Metres Hurdles (−0.5 m/s)
| Place | Athlete | Age | Country | Time | Points |
|---|---|---|---|---|---|
| 1st place, gold medalist(s) | Ackera Nugent | 22 | Jamaica | 12.29 | 8 |
| 2nd place, silver medalist(s) | Grace Stark | 23 | United States | 12.37 | 7 |
| 3rd place, bronze medalist(s) | Danielle Williams | 31 | Jamaica | 12.38 | 6 |
| 4 | Masai Russell | 24 | United States | 12.40 | 5 |
| 5 | Alaysha Johnson | 28 | United States | 12.42 | 4 |
| 6 | Cyréna Samba-Mayela | 23 | France | 12.47 | 3 |
| 7 | Nadine Visser | 29 | Netherlands | 12.49 | 2 |
| 8 | Kendra Harrison | 31 | United States | 12.52 | 1 |
| 9 | Tonea Marshall | 25 | United States | 12.76 | |

Women's 100 Metres Hurdles Round 1 - Heat
| Place | Athlete | Age | Country | Time | Heat |
|---|---|---|---|---|---|
| 1 | Danielle Williams | 31 | Jamaica | 12.37 | 1 |
| 2 | Grace Stark | 23 | United States | 12.42 | 1 |
| 3 | Kendra Harrison | 31 | United States | 12.49 | 1 |
| 4 | Cyréna Samba-Mayela | 23 | France | 12.49 | 1 |
| 5 | Maribel Caicedo | 26 | Ecuador | 12.85 | 1 |
| 6 | Marika Majewska | 22 | Poland | 13.15 | 1 |
| 7 | Yanique Thompson | 28 | Jamaica | 13.17 | 1 |
| 8 | Viktória Forster | 22 | Slovakia | 13.26 | 1 |
| 1 | Ackera Nugent | 22 | Jamaica | 12.30 | 2 |
| 2 | Alaysha Johnson | 28 | United States | 12.46 | 2 |
| 3 | Nadine Visser | 29 | Netherlands | 12.52 | 2 |
| 4 | Tonea Marshall | 25 | United States | 12.52 | 2 |
| 5 | Masai Russell | 24 | United States | 12.56 | 2 |
| 6 | Pia Skrzyszowska | 23 | Poland | 12.58 | 2 |
| 7 | Cindy Sember | 30 | Great Britain | 12.67 | 2 |
| 8 | Klaudia Wojtunik | 25 | Poland | 13.02 | 2 |

Women's 400 Metres Hurdles
| Place | Athlete | Age | Country | Time | Points |
|---|---|---|---|---|---|
| 1st place, gold medalist(s) | Femke Bol | 24 | Netherlands | 52.13 | 8 |
| 2nd place, silver medalist(s) | Anna Cockrell | 26 | United States | 52.88 | 7 |
| 3rd place, bronze medalist(s) | Rushell Clayton | 31 | Jamaica | 53.11 | 6 |
| 4 | Shiann Salmon | 25 | Jamaica | 53.15 | 5 |
| 5 | Janieve Russell | 30 | Jamaica | 53.59 | 4 |
| 6 | Andrenette Knight | 27 | Jamaica | 53.68 | 3 |
| 7 | Nikoleta Jíchová | 23 | Czech Republic | 54.92 | 2 |
| 8 | Anna Ryzhykova | 34 | Ukraine | 55.44 | 1 |
| 9 | Dalilah Muhammad | 34 | United States | 55.99 | |

Women's Triple Jump
| Place | Athlete | Age | Country | Mark | Points |
|---|---|---|---|---|---|
| 1st place, gold medalist(s) | Shanieka Ricketts | 32 | Jamaica | 14.50 m (+0.5 m/s) | 8 |
| 2nd place, silver medalist(s) | Leyanis Pérez | 22 | Cuba | 14.42 m (−0.5 m/s) | 7 |
| 3rd place, bronze medalist(s) | Dariya Derkach | 31 | Italy | 14.02 m (−1.0 m/s) | 6 |
| 4 | Jasmine Moore | 23 | United States | 13.84 m (−1.3 m/s) | 5 |
| 5 | Ackelia Smith | 22 | Jamaica | 13.78 m (+1.2 m/s) | 4 |
| 6 | Saly Sarr | 21 | Senegal | 13.58 m (−1.0 m/s) | 3 |
| 7 | Ilionis Guillaume | 26 | France | 13.43 m (−0.8 m/s) | 2 |
| 8 | Liadagmis Povea | 28 | Cuba | 13.33 m (+0.2 m/s) | 1 |

Women's Javelin Throw
| Place | Athlete | Age | Country | Mark | Points |
|---|---|---|---|---|---|
| 1st place, gold medalist(s) | Adriana Vilagoš | 20 | Serbia | 65.60 m | 8 |
| 2nd place, silver medalist(s) | Jo-Ane van Dyk | 26 | South Africa | 62.81 m | 7 |
| 3rd place, bronze medalist(s) | Nikola Ogrodníková | 34 | Czech Republic | 61.84 m | 6 |
| 4 | Maggie Malone-Hardin | 30 | United States | 60.81 m | 5 |
| 5 | Marie-Therese Obst | 28 | Norway | 60.22 m | 4 |
| 6 | Flor Ruiz | 33 | Colombia | 59.24 m | 3 |
| 7 | Victoria Hudson | 28 | Austria | 59.07 m | 2 |
| 8 | Maria Andrejczyk | 28 | Poland | 58.12 m | 1 |

=== Promotional events ===
Men's Hammer Throw
| Place | Athlete | Age | Country | Mark |
|---|---|---|---|---|
| 1st place, gold medalist(s) | Ethan Katzberg | 22 | Canada | 80.03 m |
| 2nd place, silver medalist(s) | Mykhaylo Kokhan | 23 | Ukraine | 79.85 m |
| 3rd place, bronze medalist(s) | Wojciech Nowicki | 35 | Poland | 76.05 m |
| 4 | Bence Halász | 27 | Hungary | 76.05 m |
| 5 | Paweł Fajdek | 35 | Poland | 74.53 m |

Women's Hammer Throw
| Place | Athlete | Age | Country | Mark |
|---|---|---|---|---|
| 1st place, gold medalist(s) | Brooke Andersen | 29 | United States | 76.19 m |
| 2nd place, silver medalist(s) | Hanna Skydan | 32 | Azerbaijan | 71.82 m |
| 3rd place, bronze medalist(s) | Janee' Kassanavoid | 29 | United States | 70.55 m |
| 4 | Annette Echikunwoke | 28 | United States | 70.52 m |
| 5 | Sara Fantini | 26 | Italy | 70.39 m |

Men's 100 Metres (+1.9 m/s)
| Place | Athlete | Age | Country | Time |
|---|---|---|---|---|
| 1st place, gold medalist(s) | Fred Kerley | 29 | United States | 9.87 |
| 2nd place, silver medalist(s) | Ferdinand Omanyala | 28 | Kenya | 9.88 |
| 3rd place, bronze medalist(s) | Ackeem Blake | 22 | Jamaica | 9.89 |
| 4 | Marcell Jacobs | 29 | Italy | 9.93 |
| 5 | Jeremiah Azu | 23 | Great Britain | 10.05 |
| 6 | PJ Austin | 23 | United States | 10.06 |
| 7 | Rohan Watson | 22 | Jamaica | 10.18 |
| 8 | Chituru Ali | 25 | Italy | 10.69 |

Men's 110 Metres Hurdles (+1.1 m/s)
| Place | Athlete | Age | Country | Time |
|---|---|---|---|---|
| 1st place, gold medalist(s) | Grant Holloway | 26 | United States | 13.04 |
| 2nd place, silver medalist(s) | Rasheed Broadbell | 24 | Jamaica | 13.05 |
| 3rd place, bronze medalist(s) | Daniel Roberts | 26 | United States | 13.24 |
| 4 | Cordell Tinch | 24 | United States | 13.29 |
| 5 | Orlando Bennett | 24 | Jamaica | 13.35 |
| 6 | Sasha Zhoya | 22 | France | 13.40 |
| 7 | Jakub Szymański | 22 | Poland | 13.41 |
| 8 | Lorenzo Simonelli | 22 | Italy | 13.48 |
| 9 | Krzysztof Kiljan | 24 | Poland | 13.73 |

Men's 400 Metres Hurdles
| Place | Athlete | Age | Country | Time |
|---|---|---|---|---|
| 1st place, gold medalist(s) | Karsten Warholm | 28 | Norway | 46.95 |
| 2nd place, silver medalist(s) | Clément Ducos | 23 | France | 47.42 |
| 3rd place, bronze medalist(s) | Abderrahman Samba | 28 | Qatar | 47.69 |
| 4 | Roshawn Clarke | 20 | Jamaica | 47.74 |
| 5 | Rasmus Mägi | 32 | Estonia | 47.97 |
| 6 | Matheus Lima | 21 | Brazil | 48.12 |
| 7 | Berke Akçam | 22 | Turkey | 48.58 |
| 8 | Vít Müller | 27 | Czech Republic | 49.20 |
| 9 | Jaheel Hyde | 27 | Jamaica | 50.57 |

Women's 1000 Metres
| Place | Athlete | Age | Country | Time |
|---|---|---|---|---|
| 1st place, gold medalist(s) | Nelly Chepchirchir | 21 | Kenya | 2:31.24 |
| 2nd place, silver medalist(s) | Jemma Reekie | 26 | Great Britain | 2:32.56 |
| 3rd place, bronze medalist(s) | Mary Moraa | 24 | Kenya | 2:33.43 |
| 4 | Halimah Nakaayi | 29 | Uganda | 2:33.44 |
| 5 | Natoya Goule | 33 | Jamaica | 2:34.37 |
| 6 | Noélie Yarigo | 38 | Benin | 2:36.33 |
| 7 | Gabriela Gajanová | 24 | Slovakia | 2:36.42 |
| 8 | Angelika Sarna | 26 | Poland | 2:37.42 |
| 9 | Elena Bellò | 27 | Italy | 2:37.76 |
| 10 | Nia Akins | 26 | United States | 2:38.30 |
| | Vivian Chebet Kiprotich | 28 | Kenya | DNF |
| | Aneta Lemiesz | 43 | Poland | DNF |
