= World Athletics Continental Tour =

Annual series of athletics competitions

- Current season, competition or edition: 2026 World Athletics Continental Tour
- Sport: Track and field
- Founded: 2020
- Continent: global
- Website: World Continental Tour

The World Athletics Continental Tour is an annual series of independent track and field athletic competitions, recognised by World Athletics (formerly known as the IAAF). The Tour forms the second tier of international one-day meetings after the Diamond League. First held in 2020, it replaced the IAAF World Challenge series.

Initially divided into three levels – Gold, Silver and Bronze – the Continental Tour was expanded in 2022 with the fourth tier: Challenger. The Gold meetings are organised globally, with investment from World Athletics, and represent the second tier of meetings in the sport. Area associations are responsible for managing the Silver and Bronze level competitions.

== Editions ==
Edition	Year	Start date	End date	Meets	Gold	Silver	Bronze	Challenger	Ref.
1	2020	22 February	6 December	28	7	5	16	—N/a	
2	2021	6 February	18 September	69	12	16	41	—N/a	
3	2022	22 January	17 December	152	12	18	53	69	
4	2023	21 January	10 September	165	14	25	48	78	
5	2024	20 January	20 September	221	12	33	70	106	
6	2025	25 January	7 September	249	12	45	89	103	
7	2026	17 January	18 September	243	12	40	82	109	

== Gold Standard meetings ==
#	Meeting	City	Country	2020	2021	2022	2023	2024	2025	2026
1	USATF Bermuda Games	Devonshire	Bermuda	—N/a	—N/a	1	6	—N/a	—N/a	—N/a
2	USATF Golden Games	Walnut	United States	—N/a	3	2	—N/a	—N/a	—N/a	—N/a
3	USATF Grand Prix	Eugene	United States	—N/a	1	—N/a	—N/a	—N/a	—N/a	—N/a
4	Kip Keino Classic	Nairobi	Kenya	7	12	3	4	2	2	2
5	Seiko Golden Grand Prix	Tokyo	Japan	3	2	4	5	4	3	3
6	Ostrava Golden Spike	Ostrava	Czech Republic	5	4	5	12	5	8	8
7	Adidas Games	Boston	United States	—N/a	5	—N/a	—N/a	—N/a	—N/a	—N/a
8	Irena Szewińska Memorial	Bydgoszcz	Poland	—N/a	8	6	9	8	4	4
9	Janusz Kusociński Memorial	Chorzów	Poland	—N/a	—N/a	7	—N/a	—N/a	—N/a	—N/a
10	FBK Games	Hengelo	Netherlands	—N/a	6	8	8	9	9	9
11	USATF New York Grand Prix	New York City	United States	—N/a	—N/a	9	11	6	—	—
12	Paavo Nurmi Games	Turku	Finland	1	7	10	10	7	5	5
13	Gyulai István Memorial	Budapest	Hungary	2	9	11	13	10	11	11
14	Kamila Skolimowska Memorial	Chorzów	Poland	4	10	—N/a	—N/a	—N/a	—N/a	—N/a
15	Hanžeković Memorial	Zagreb	Croatia	6	11	12	14	11	10	10
16	Maurie Plant Meet	Melbourne	Australia	—N/a	—N/a	—N/a	1	1	1	1
17	Grenada Invitational	St. George's	Grenada	—N/a	—N/a	—N/a	2	—N/a	—N/a	—N/a
18	Botswana Golden Grand Prix	Gaborone	Botswana	—N/a	—N/a	—N/a	3	—	—	—N/a
19	USATF Los Angeles Invitational	Los Angeles	United States	—N/a	—N/a	—N/a	7	3	7	7
20	World Athletics Continental Tour - Beijing	Beijing	China	—N/a	—N/a	—N/a	—N/a	—N/a	12	—N/a
21	Grande Prêmio Brasil Caixa de Atletismo	São Paulo	Brazil	—N/a	—N/a	—N/a	—N/a	—N/a	—N/a	12
22	USATF Lone Star Grand Prix	Texas	United States	—	—	—	—	—	—	6

The number in the table represents the order in which the meeting took place.
