= 2022 World Athletics Continental Tour =

- Organisers: World Athletics
- Edition: 3rd

The 2022 World Athletics Continental Tour, also known as the 2022 Continental Tour, is the third season of the annual series of outdoor track and field meetings, organised by World Athletics. The Tour forms the second tier of international one-day meetings after the Diamond League.

The Continental Tour is divided into three levels – Gold, Silver and Bronze – whose status is determined by the quality of competition and prize money on offer.

== Schedule ==
=== Gold level ===
2022 World Athletics Continental Tour Gold calendar
Date	Meeting	City	Country
9 April	USATF Bermuda Games	Devonshire	Bermuda
16 April	USATF Golden Games	Walnut	United States
7 May	Kip Keino Classic	Nairobi	Kenya
8 May	Seiko Golden Grand Prix	Tokyo	Japan
31 May	Ostrava Golden Spike	Ostrava	Czech Republic
3 June	Irena Szewińska Memorial	Bydgoszcz	Poland
5 June	Janusz Kusociński Memorial	Chorzów	Poland
6 June	FBK Games	Hengelo	Netherlands
12 June	USATF New York Grand Prix	New York	United States
14 June	Paavo Nurmi Games	Turku	Finland
8 August	Gyulai István Memorial	Székesfehérvár	Hungary
9–11 September	Hanžeković Memorial	Zagreb	Croatia

=== Silver level ===
2022 World Athletics Continental Tour Silver calendar
Date	Meeting	City	Country
27 March	Grand Prix International CAA de Douala	Douala	Cameroon
9 April	Brisbane Track Classic	Brisbane	Australia
27–30 April	Drake Relays	Des Moines	United States
12 May	Puerto Rico International Athletics Classic	Ponce	Puerto Rico
19 May	USATF Distance Classic	Walnut	United States
21 May	USATF Throws Fest	Tucson	United States
2 June	Montreuil International Meeting	Montreuil	France
3 June	BoXX United Manchester World Athletics Continental Tour	Manchester	United Kingdom
3–5 June	Music City Track Carnival Festival	Nashville	United States
8–9 June	P-T-S Meeting	Šamorín	Slovakia
18 June	Kuortane Games	Kuortane	Finland
18 June	Meeting de Atletismo Madrid	Madrid	Spain
3 July	2022 Pre World Championships Invitational	Edmonton	Canada
29–30 July	Murphey Classic	Memphis	United States
30 August	Palio Città della Quercia	Rovereto	Italy
30 August	Spitzen Leichtathletik Luzern	Lucerne	Switzerland
4 September	ISTAF	Berlin	Germany
12 September	Galà dei Castelli	Bellinzona	Switzerland

=== Bronze level ===
2022 World Athletics Continental Tour Bronze calendar
Date	Meeting	City	Country
20 February	Sir Graeme Douglas International	Auckland	New Zealand
26 February	International Track Meet	Christchurch	New Zealand
12 March	Sydney Track Classic	Sydney	Australia
19 March	Melbourne Track Classic	Melbourne	Australia
28–30 April	The Penn Relays Carnival	Philadelphia	United States
29 April	Mikio Oda Memorial	Hiroshima	Japan
30 April	Gaborone International Meet	Gaborone	Botswana
30 April – 1 May	Kinami Michitaka Memorial	Osaka	Japan
1 May	Grande Premio Internacional Brasil Loterias Caixa de Atletismo	São Paulo	Brazil
3 May	Shizuoka International Athletics Meet	Fukuroi	Japan
6 May	Track Meet	San Juan Capistrano	United States
7 May	The Orange County Classic	San Juan Capistrano	United States
14 May	Felix Sánchez Classic	Santo Domingo	Dominican Republic
20 May	Track Night NYC	New York City	United States
21 May	Duval County Challenge	Jacksonville	United States
25 May	24. Internationales Leichtathletik Meeting "Anhalt 2022"	Dessau	Germany
25 May	International Jumping Meeting "Filahtlitikos Kallithea"	Kallithea	Greece
25 May	Meeting Iberoamericano	Huelva	Spain
27 May	Poznań Athletics Grand Prix	Poznań	Poland
29 May	Venizelia - Chania International Meeting	Chania	Greece
1 June	Filothei Women Gala	Athens	Greece
2 June	Austrian Open	Eisenstadt	Australia
2 June	Dromia International Sprint and Relays Meeting	Vari	Greece
2 June	Jessheim 1500m Elite	Jessheim	Norway
4 June	Meeting Jaen Paraiso Interior	Andújar	Spain
5 June	57. Internationales Pfingstsportfest	Rehlingen	Germany
6 June	Josef Odložil Memorial	Prague	Czech Republic
8 June	Trond Mohn Games	Bergen	Norway
10–11 June	Portland Track Festival	Portland	United States
11 June	AtleticaGeneve	Geneva	Switzerland
12 June	Sollentuna GP	Sollentuna	Sweden
13–14 June	Vancouver Sun Harry Jerome International Track Classic	Burnaby	Canada
14 June	CITIUS Meeting	Bern	Switzerland
14 June	Kladno hází a Kladenské Memoriály	Kladno	Czech Republic
16 June	Copenhagen Athletics Games	Copenhagen	Denmark
25 June	Meeting de Dakar	Dakar	Senegal
25–26 June	Qosanov Memorial	Almaty	Kazakhstan
29 June	Meeting International d'Athlétisme de la Province de Liège	Liège	Belgium
30 June	Boysen Memorial	Oslo	Norway
2 July	Meeting Stanislas Nancy	Tomblaine	France
2 July	KBC Night of Athletics	Heusden-Zolder	Belgium
3 July	Karlstad GP	Karlstad	Sweden
4 July	Meeting International de Sotteville	Sotteville-lès-Rouen	France
5 July	Cork City Sports	Cork	Ireland
8 July	Stumptown Twilight Meet	Portland	United States
9 July	Sunset Tour - Occidental College	Los Angeles	United States
30 July	Gothenburg Athletics GP	Gothenburg	Sweden
28 August	#True Athletes Classics	Leverkusen	Germany
2 September	Hungarian GP Series	Budapest	Hungary
4 September	Meeting Città di Padova	Padova	Italy
6 September	Hungarian GP Series	Pápa	Hungary
1–2 October	Athletics Challenge	Niigata	Japan
