= 2026 Kamila Skolimowska Memorial =

Athletics meeting in Chorzów, Poland

- Dates: 22-23 August 2026
- Host city: Chorzów
- Venue: Silesian Stadium
- Level: 2026 Diamond League

The 2026 Kamila Skolimowska Memorial was the 17th edition of the annual outdoor track and field meeting in Chorzów, Poland. It was held on 22 and 23 August at the Silesian Stadium, it was the thirteenth leg of the 2026 Diamond League – the highest level international track and field circuit.

== Diamond+ events results ==
=== Men ===
100 Metres - Heats
Place	Athlete	Nation	Time	Notes
Heat 1
1	Oblique Seville	Jamaica	9.90	Q
2	Gift Leotlela	South Africa	9.92	Q
3	Akani Simbine	South Africa	9.93	Q, SB
4	Christian Coleman	United States	9.94 [.935]	q
5	Ronnie Baker	United States	9.94 [.936]	q
6	Lachlan Kennedy	Australia	10.08	
7	Jordan Anthony	United States	10.16	
8	Jeremiah Azu	Great Britain	10.22	
9	Owen Ansah	Germany	10.26	
			Wind: (+1.9 m/s)	
Heat 2
1	Kenny Bednarek	United States	10.03	Q
2	Andre De Grasse	Canada	10.07 [.062]	Q
3	Kayinsola Ajayi	Nigeria	10.07 [.064]	Q
4	Emmanuel Eseme	Cameroon	10.07 [.067]	q
5	Sam Blaskowski	United States	10.14 [.132]	
6	Romell Glave	Great Britain	10.14 [.136]	
7	Ackeem Blake	Jamaica	10.26 [.136]	
8	Trayvon Bromell	United States	10.26 [.258]	
9	Dominik Kopec	Poland	10.32	
			Wind: (+1.2 m/s)	

The final was the first race in which nine athletes broke the 10-second barrier. Only the 2024 Olympic final had previously featured eight such.

100 Metres
Place	Athlete	Nation	Time	Points	Notes
1st place, gold medalist(s)	Oblique Seville	Jamaica	9.83	8	MR
2nd place, silver medalist(s)	Kenny Bednarek	United States	9.87	7	SB
3rd place, bronze medalist(s)	Christian Coleman	United States	9.93	6	
4	Kayinsola Ajayi	Nigeria	9.94	5	
5	Gift Leotlela	South Africa	9.95	4	
6	Andre De Grasse	Canada	9.96 [.957]	3	
7	Akani Simbine	South Africa	9.96 [.958]	2	
8	Ronnie Baker	United States	9.97	1	
9	Emmanuel Eseme	Cameroon	9.99		
			Wind: (+1.4 m/s)		

110 Metres hurdles
Place	Athlete	Nation	Time	Points	Notes
1st place, gold medalist(s)	Jamal Britt	United States	13.05	8	
2nd place, silver medalist(s)	Trey Cunningham	United States	13.08	7	
3rd place, bronze medalist(s)	Ja'Kobe Tharp	United States	13.09	6	
4	Cordell Tinch	United States	13.22	5	
5	Orlando Bennett	Jamaica	13.25	4	
6	Jakub Szymański	Poland	13.34	3	
7	Rachid Muratake	Japan	13.41	2	
8	Just Kwaou-Mathey	France	13.46	1	
—	Kendry Menéndez	Cuba	DNF		
			Wind: (−0.7 m/s)		

400 Metres hurdles
Place	Athlete	Nation	Time	Points	Notes
1st place, gold medalist(s)	Alison dos Santos	Brazil	46.43	8	WL
2nd place, silver medalist(s)	Karsten Warholm	Norway	46.52	7	SB
3rd place, bronze medalist(s)	Matheus Lima	Brazil	47.26	6	PB
4	Ezekiel Nathaniel	Nigeria	47.83	5	
5	Oskar Edlund	Sweden	48.34	4	
6	İsmail Nezir	Turkey	48.46	3	
7	Abderrahman Samba	Qatar	48.64	2	
8	Trevor Bassitt	United States	48.71	1	
—	Caleb Dean	United States	DNF		

Discus throw
Place	Athlete	Nation	Distance	Points	Notes
1st place, gold medalist(s)	Mykolas Alekna	Lithuania	72.58 m	8	DLR
2nd place, silver medalist(s)	Kristjan Čeh	Slovenia	68.93 m	7	
3rd place, bronze medalist(s)	Daniel Ståhl	Sweden	68.25 m	6	
4	Henrik Janssen	Germany	68.19 m	5	
5	Steven Richter	Germany	67.81 m	4	
6	Rojé Stona	Jamaica	67.65 m	3	
7	Ralford Mullings	Jamaica	66.44 m	2	SB
8	Matthew Denny	Australia	66.38 m	1	
9	Alex Rose	Samoa	64.36 m		
10	Ruben Rolvink	Netherlands	63.36 m		

=== Women ===
100 Metres
Place	Athlete	Nation	Time	Points	Notes
1st place, gold medalist(s)	Melissa Jefferson-Wooden	United States	10.78	8	=SB
2nd place, silver medalist(s)	Julien Alfred	Saint Lucia	10.83	7	SB
3rd place, bronze medalist(s)	Sha'Carri Richardson	United States	10.96 [.957]	6	
4	Brianna Lyston	Jamaica	10.96 [.960]	5	
5	Ewa Swoboda	Poland	11.00	4	
6	Tina Clayton	Jamaica	11.01	3	
7	Zoe Hobbs	New Zealand	11.05	2	
8	Kayla White	United States	11.11	1	
9	Tia Clayton	Jamaica	11.24		
			Wind: (+0.6 m/s)		

400 Metres
Place	Athlete	Nation	Time	Points	Notes
1st place, gold medalist(s)	Marileidy Paulino	Dominican Republic	48.87	8	
2nd place, silver medalist(s)	Nickisha Pryce	Jamaica	49.49	7	SB
3rd place, bronze medalist(s)	Salwa Eid Naser	Bahrain	49.57	6	SB
4	Natalia Bukowiecka	Poland	49.60	5	
5	Lieke Klaver	Netherlands	49.71	4	
6	Stacey-Ann Williams	Jamaica	49.81	3	
7	Henriette Jæger	Norway	49.85	2	
8	Aaliyah Butler	United States	50.38	1	
9	Roxana Gómez	Cuba	50.88		

High jump
Place	Athlete	Nation	Height	Points	Notes
1st place, gold medalist(s)	Yaroslava Mahuchikh	Ukraine	2.00 m	8	MR
2nd place, silver medalist(s)	Iryna Herashchenko	Ukraine	1.98 m	6	SB
3rd place, bronze medalist(s)	Eleanor Patterson	Australia	1.98 m	5	
4	Nicola Olyslagers	Australia	1.96 m	4	
5	Angelina Topić	Serbia	1.96 m	3	
6	Louise Ekman	Sweden	1.93 m	2	
6	Marija Vuković	Montenegro	1.93 m	2	
8	Maria Żodzik	Poland	1.93 m	1	
9	Lamara Distin	Jamaica	1.89 m		
9	Yuliia Levchenko	Ukraine	1.89 m		
11	Vashti Cunningham	United States	1.89 m		

Long jump
Place	Athlete	Nation	Distance	Points	Notes
1st place, gold medalist(s)	Alyssa Jones	United States	6.98 m (+1.5 m/s)	8	=MR
2nd place, silver medalist(s)	Agate de Sousa	Portugal	6.98 m (+1.0 m/s)	7	MR
3rd place, bronze medalist(s)	Monae' Nichols	United States	6.95 m (+0.1 m/s)	6	=SB
4	Jazmin Sawyers	Great Britain	6.84 m (−0.8 m/s)	5	
5	Maja Åskag	Sweden	6.66 m (+0.4 m/s)	4	
6	Marthe Koala	Burkina Faso	6.64 m (−0.8 m/s)	3	
7	Malaika Mihambo	Germany	6.60 m (−0.6 m/s)	2	
8	Claire Bryant	United States	6.53 m (+0.8 m/s)	1	
9	Nia Robinson	Jamaica	6.29 m (+0.1 m/s)		
10	Adrianna Sułek-Schubert	Poland	5.92 m (−0.4 m/s)		

== Diamond events results ==
=== Men ===
400 Metres
Place	Athlete	Nation	Time	Points	Notes
1st place, gold medalist(s)	Collen Kebinatshipi	Botswana	43.59	8	MR
2nd place, silver medalist(s)	Rai Benjamin	United States	43.83	7	PB
3rd place, bronze medalist(s)	Zakithi Nene	South Africa	44.37	6	
4	Jacory Patterson	United States	44.41	5	
5	Attila Molnár	Hungary	44.68	4	
6	Jereem Richards	Trinidad and Tobago	44.72	3	
7	Christopher Bailey	United States	44.77	2	
8	Bayapo Ndori	Botswana	45.18	1	
9	Maksymilian Szwed	Poland	45.35		

1500 Metres
Place	Athlete	Nation	Time	Points	Notes
1st place, gold medalist(s)	Ethan Strand	United States	3:30.77	8	SB
2nd place, silver medalist(s)	Phanuel Koech	Kenya	3:31.14	7	
3rd place, bronze medalist(s)	Cole Hocker	United States	3:31.16	6	
4	Jakob Ingebrigtsen	Norway	3:31.19	5	
5	Samuel Pihlström	Sweden	3:31.41	4	SB
6	Jake Heyward	Great Britain	3:31.47	3	SB
7	Vincent Ciattei	United States	3:31.77	2	
8	Anass Essayi	Morocco	3:31.91	1	
9	Isaac Nader	Portugal	3:32.00		
10	Romain Mornet	France	3:32.15		
11	Hobbs Kessler	United States	3:32.76		
12	Filip Ostrowski	Poland	3:33.09		PB
13	Reynold Cheruiyot	Kenya	3:37.37		
14	Stefan Nillessen	Netherlands	3:41.72		
15	Nathan Green	United States	3:47.72		
—	Žan Rudolf	Slovenia	DNF		PM
—	Patryk Sieradzki	Poland	DNF		PM

3000 Metres steeplechase
Place	Athlete	Nation	Time	Points	Notes
1st place, gold medalist(s)	Gemechu Godana	Ethiopia	8:02.74	8	MR, PB
2nd place, silver medalist(s)	Soufiane El Bakkali	Morocco	8:04.61	7	
3rd place, bronze medalist(s)	Salaheddine Ben Yazide	Morocco	8:05.08	6	PB
4	Ruben Querinjean	Luxembourg	8:05.36	5	NR
5	Samuel Firewu	Ethiopia	8:06.65	4	SB
6	Edmund Serem	Ethiopia	8:09.57	3	
7	Karl Bebendorf	Germany	8:10.40	2	
8	Daniel Arce	Spain	8:11.04	1	SB
9	Ryuji Miura	Japan	8:11.84		
10	Mohamed Tindouft	Morocco	8:12.20		
11	Matthew Wilkinson	United States	8:12.56		
12	Nathan Mountain	United States	8:16.18		
13	Niklas Buchholz	Germany	8:20.39		
14	Ahmed Jaziri	Tunisia	8:22.33		
15	Faid El Mostafa	Morocco	8:29.63		
16	Maciej Megier	Poland	8:37.02		
17	Amos Serem	Kenya	8:42.74		PM
—	Nicolas-Marie Daru	France	DNF		
—	Abderrafia Bouassel	Morocco	DNF		PM

High jump
Place	Athlete	Nation	Height	Points	Notes
1st place, gold medalist(s)	Gianmarco Tamberi	Italy	2.31 m	8	
2nd place, silver medalist(s)	Romaine Beckford	Jamaica	2.29 m	7	
3rd place, bronze medalist(s)	JuVaughn Harrison	United States	2.26 m	6	
4	Mateusz Kołodziejski	Poland	2.26 m	5	
5	Oleh Doroshchuk	Ukraine	2.26 m	4	
6	Tyus Wilson	United States	2.26 m	3	
7	Mutaz Barsham	Qatar	2.26 m	2	
8	Joel Clarke-Khan	Great Britain	2.20 m	1	
9	Erick Portillo	Mexico	2.20 m		
10	Jan Štefela	Czech Republic	2.20 m		
—	Woo Sang-hyeok	South Korea	NM		

=== Women ===
1500 Metres
Place	Athlete	Nation	Time	Points	Notes
1st place, gold medalist(s)	Tsige Duguma	Ethiopia	3:55.06	8	WL, PB
2nd place, silver medalist(s)	Jessica Hull	Australia	3:55.20	7	SB
3rd place, bronze medalist(s)	Dorcus Ewoi	Kenya	3:55.58	6	SB
4	Klaudia Kazimierska	Poland	3:55.59	5	NR
5	Emily Mackay	United States	3:56.24	4	SB
6	Agathe Guillemot	France	3:56.34	3	
7	Sarah Billings	Australia	3:56.73	2	PB
8	Birke Haylom	Ethiopia	3:56.76	1	
9	Sarah Healy	Ireland	3:57.42		SB
10	Nikki Hiltz	United States	4:00.52		
11	Saron Berhe	Ethiopia	4:01.15		
12	Patrícia Silva	Portugal	4:01.24		
13	Linden Hall	Australia	4:01.44		
14	Weronika Lizakowska	Poland	4:02.95		SB
15	Sinclaire Johnson	United States	4:04.93		
—	Lorea Ibarzabal	Spain	DNF		PM
—	Taryn Parks	United States	DNF		PM

5000 Metres
Place	Athlete	Nation	Time	Points	Notes
1st place, gold medalist(s)	Nadia Battocletti	Italy	14:54.09	8	MR
2nd place, silver medalist(s)	Freweyni Hailu	Ethiopia	14:54.62	7	
3rd place, bronze medalist(s)	Rose Davies	Australia	14:55.39	6	
4	Marta Alemayo	Ethiopia	14:55.46	5	
5	Aleshign Baweke	Ethiopia	14:55.49	4	
6	Senayet Getachew	Ethiopia	14:55.51	3	
7	Fantaye Belayneh	Ethiopia	14:55.97	2	
8	Likina Amebaw	Ethiopia	14:56.42	1	
9	Marta García	Spain	14:56.48		SB
10	Francine Niyomukunzi	Burundi	14:57.34		
11	Hannah Nuttall	Great Britain	14:57.63		
12	Maureen Koster	Netherlands	14:57.81		
13	Asayech Ayichew	Ethiopia	14:57.92		
14	Nozomi Tanaka	Japan	14:58.35		SB
15	Hirut Meshesha	Ethiopia	14:58.86		
16	Georgia Griffith	Australia	14:59.02		
17	Lauren Ryan	Australia	15:02.73		
18	Alicia Monson	United States	15:03.46		
19	Yenawa Nbret	Ethiopia	15:04.98		
20	Elżbieta Glinka	Poland	15:08.19		PB
—	Gracie Morris	United States	DNF		
—	Kristiina Mäki	Czech Republic	DNF		

Triple jump
Place	Athlete	Nation	Distance	Points	Notes
1st place, gold medalist(s)	Saly Sarr	Senegal	15.08 m (+0.1 m/s)	8	NR
2nd place, silver medalist(s)	Leyanis Pérez	Cuba	14.91 m (−0.2 m/s)	7	
3rd place, bronze medalist(s)	Davisleydi Velazco	Cuba	14.84 m (+1.2 m/s)	6	
4	Thea Lafond	Dominica	14.58 m (−0.3 m/s)	5	
5	Dariya Derkach	Italy	14.33 m (+0.2 m/s)	4	
6	Liadagmis Povea	Cuba	14.18 m (+0.3 m/s)	3	
7	Aleksandra Nacheva	Bulgaria	14.09 m (−1.1 m/s)	2	
8	Ackelia Smith	Jamaica	13.97 m (−0.7 m/s)	1	
9	Ivana Španović	Serbia	13.46 m (±0.0 m/s)		
10	Saliyya Guisse	Belgium	13.45 m (−0.9 m/s)		

== Promotional events results ==
=== Men ===
Pole vault
Place	Athlete	Nation	Height	Notes
1st place, gold medalist(s)	Armand Duplantis	Sweden	6.20 m	
2nd place, silver medalist(s)	Sondre Guttormsen	Norway	6.00 m	
2nd place, silver medalist(s)	Emmanouil Karalis	Greece	6.00 m	
4	Chris Nilsen	United States	5.90 m	
5	Kurtis Marschall	Australia	5.90 m	
6	KC Lightfoot	United States	5.90 m	
7	EJ Obiena	Philippines	5.80 m	
8	Zachery Bradford	United States	5.65 m	
8	Sam Kendricks	United States	5.65 m	
8	Baptiste Thiery	France	5.65 m	

Shot put
Place	Athlete	Nation	Distance	Notes
1st place, gold medalist(s)	Leonardo Fabbri	Italy	22.08 m	
2nd place, silver medalist(s)	Jordan Geist	United States	21.96 m	
3rd place, bronze medalist(s)	Joe Kovacs	United States	21.86 m	
4	Payton Otterdahl	United States	21.80 m	SB
5	Adrian Piperi	United States	21.64 m	
6	Rajindra Campbell	Jamaica	21.61 m	
7	Roger Steen	United States	21.46 m	
8	Tom Walsh	New Zealand	21.29 m	
9	Wictor Petersson	Sweden	20.46 m	
10	Konrad Bukowiecki	Poland	20.32 m	

Hammer throw
Place	Athlete	Nation	Distance	Notes
1st place, gold medalist(s)	Ethan Katzberg	Canada	82.92 m	
2nd place, silver medalist(s)	Merlin Hummel	Germany	81.25 m	
3rd place, bronze medalist(s)	Bence Halász	Hungary	79.44 m	
4	Rudy Winkler	United States	78.75 m	
5	Yann Chaussinand	France	77.65 m	
6	Paweł Fajdek	Poland	76.44 m	
7	Wojciech Nowicki	Poland	72.92 m	

=== Women ===
300 Metres
Place	Athlete	Nation	Time	Notes
1st place, gold medalist(s)	Lurdes Gloria Manuel	Czech Republic	35.76	DLR, PB
2nd place, silver medalist(s)	Charlotte Henrich	Great Britain	35.92	PB
3rd place, bronze medalist(s)	Martina Weil	Chile	36.16	PB
4	Alexis Holmes	United States	36.18	PB
5	Kinga Gacka	Poland	36.90	PB
6	Alicja Wrona-Kutrzepa	Poland	37.30	
7	Izabela Smolińska	Poland	37.92	SB

100 Metres hurdles
Place	Athlete	Nation	Time	Notes
1st place, gold medalist(s)	Alaysha Johnson	United States	12.52	
2nd place, silver medalist(s)	Megan Simmonds	Jamaica	12.62	
3rd place, bronze medalist(s)	Pia Skrzyszowska	Poland	12.64 [.635]	
4	Ackera Nugent	Jamaica	12.64 [.640]	
5	Danielle Williams	Jamaica	12.70	
6	Rayniah Jones	United States	12.75	
7	Hitomi Nakajima	Japan	12.91	
8	Laëticia Bapté	France	12.93	
9	Kendra Harrison	United States	13.15	
			Wind: (+0.2 m/s)	

Shot put
Place	Athlete	Nation	Distance	Notes
1st place, gold medalist(s)	Chase Jackson	United States	20.92 m MR, SB	
2nd place, silver medalist(s)	Jessica Schilder	Netherlands	20.20 m	
3rd place, bronze medalist(s)	Sarah Mitton	Canada	19.34 m	
4	Adelaide Aquilla	United States	18.65 m	
5	Fanny Roos	Sweden	18.59 m	
6	Auriol Dongmo	Portugal	18.58 m	
7	Jessica Inchude	Portugal	18.57 m	
8	Danniel Thomas-Dodd	Jamaica	18.16 m	
9	Jorinde van Klinken	Netherlands	17.47 m	

Hammer throw
Place	Athlete	Nation	Distance	Notes
1st place, gold medalist(s)	Camryn Rogers	Canada	77.09 m	
2nd place, silver medalist(s)	DeAnna Price	United States	75.23 m	
3rd place, bronze medalist(s)	Sara Fantini	Italy	71.95 m	
4	Annette Echikunwoke	United States	71.08 m	
5	Aleksandra Śmiech	Poland	67.50 m	

== See also ==
- 2026 Diamond League
