= 2021 World Athletics Continental Tour =

- Organisers: World Athletics
- Edition: 2nd

The 2021 World Athletics Continental Tour, also known as the 2021 Continental Tour, is the second season of the annual series of outdoor track and field meetings, organised by World Athletics. The Tour forms the second tier of international one-day meetings after the Diamond League.

The Continental Tour is divided into three levels – Gold, Silver and Bronze – whose status is determined by the quality of competition and prize money on offer.

== 2021 Continental Tour gold level schedule ==
2021 World Athletics Continental Tour Gold calendar
| Date | Meeting | City | Country |
| 24 April | USATF Grand Prix | Eugene | United States |
| 9 May | "READY STEADY TOKYO - Athletics" | Tokyo | Japan |
| 9 May | USATF Golden Games | Walnut | United States |
| 19 May | Ostrava Golden Spike | Ostrava | Czech Republic |
| 23 May | adidas Boost Boston Games | Boston | United States |
| 6 June | FBK Games | Hengelo | Netherlands |
| 8 June | Paavo Nurmi Games | Turku | Finland |
| 30 June | Irena Szewińska Memorial | Bydgoszcz | Poland |
| 6 July | Gyulai István Memorial | Székesfehérvár | Hungary |
| 5 September | Kamila Skolimowska Memorial | Chorzów | Poland |
| 14 September | Hanžeković Memorial | Zagreb | Croatia |
| 18 September | Kip Keino Classic | Nairobi | Kenya |
