= Kamila Skolimowska Memorial =

Athletics tournament held in Poland

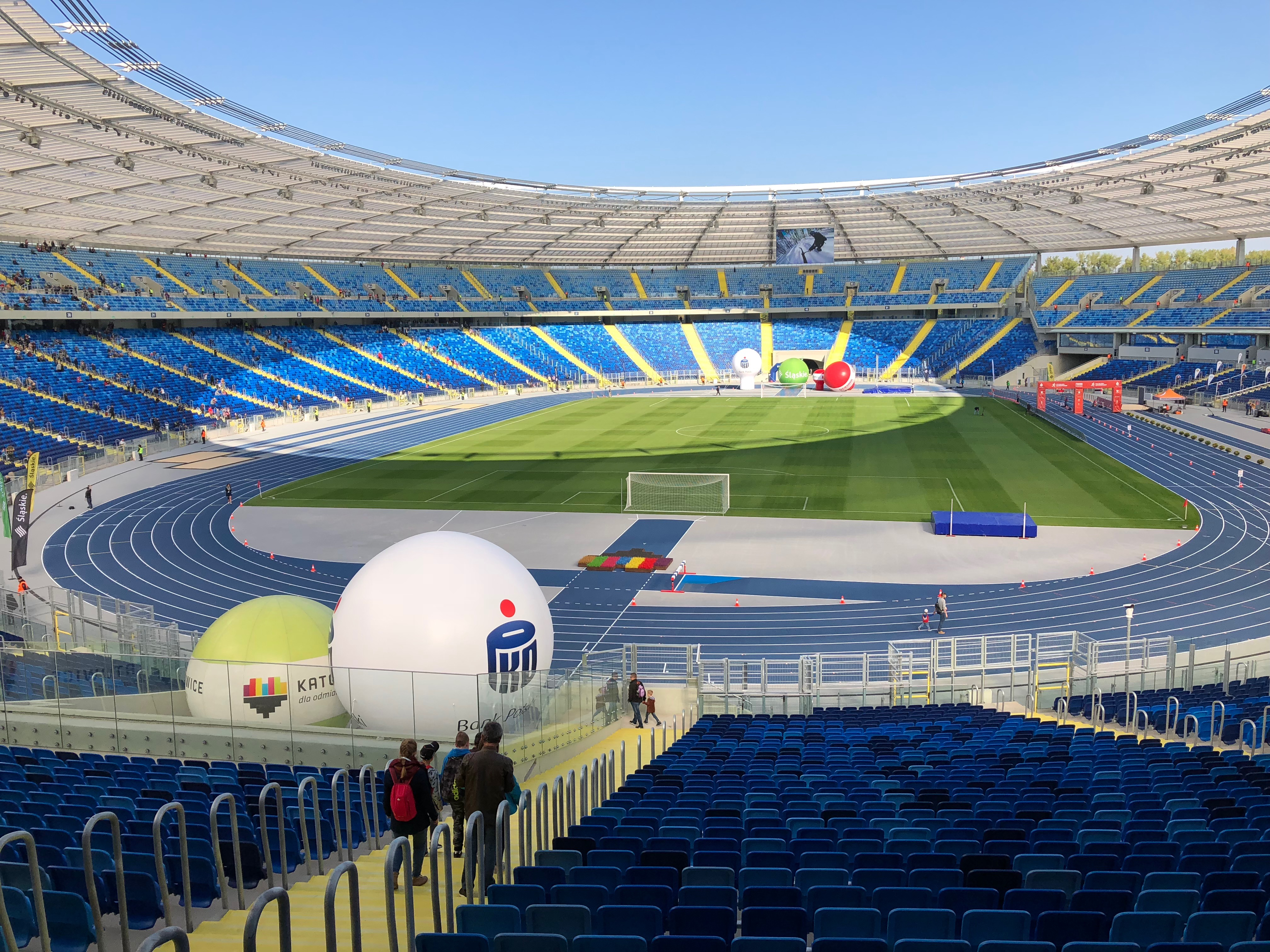
- The host stadium in Chorzów
- Date: July – September
- Location: Silesian Stadium; Chorzów, Poland
- Event type: Track and field
- World Athletics Cat.: GW
- Established: 2 May 2009; 17 years ago
- Website: Kamila Skolimowska Memorial
- 2026 Kamila Skolimowska Memorial

The Kamila Skolimowska Memorial (Polish: Memoriał Kamili Skolimowskiej), also known as the Silesia Kamila Skolimowska Memorial, is an annual track and field meeting held at the Silesian Stadium in Chorzów, Poland in summer, organized by the Kamila Skolimowska Foundation. In 2020 the meeting was part of the inaugural World Athletics Continental Tour. Since 2022, the event has been part of the Diamond League series.

== History ==
The event is held in memory of Polish hammer thrower and Olympic champion Kamila Skolimowska, who died on 18 February 2009. The inaugural edition took place at the RKS Skra Stadium in Warsaw on 2 May 2009 and consisted of the men's and women's hammer throw events only. The meeting inaugurated the Kamila Skolimowska Hammer Throw Center in Warsaw and was initially supposed to be a one-off event.

In 2011, a decision was taken by the Kamila Skolimowska Foundation to organize further editions of the meeting and add more competitions. The following editions were held at Warsaw's Orzeł Stadium until it moved to National Stadium in 2014. From 2018 onwards the meeting moved to Chorzów.

At the 2014 edition of the meeting, Usain Bolt set a world indoor record over 100 meters achieving 9.98 seconds and improving the previous record of Frankie Fredericks set in 1996. The Warsaw National Stadium's roof was closed for the event, making the indoor record possible.

In 2016, Anita Włodarczyk set a world record in the hammer throw by achieving 82.98 meters.

In 2020, the memorial was part of the inaugural World Athletics Continental Tour. Since 2022, the event has been part of the Diamond League series becoming the first Polish site of a Diamond League meeting.

In 2024, an estimated 42,357 spectators gathered at the Silesian Stadium making it the largest attendance in the event's history. Two world records were set during the meeting, first by Jakob Ingebrigtsen in the 3000 m steeplechase (7:17.55) followed by Armand Duplantis in the pole vault (6.26 m).

== Editions ==
Kamila Skolimowska Memorial editions
Ed.	Meeting	Series	Date	Ref.
1st	2009 Kamila Skolimowska Memorial		2 May 2009	
2nd	2011 Kamila Skolimowska Memorial		20 Sep 2011	
3rd	2012 Kamila Skolimowska Memorial		19 Aug 2012	
4th	2013 Kamila Skolimowska Memorial		25 Aug 2013	
5th	2014 Kamila Skolimowska Memorial		23 Aug 2014	
6th	2015 Kamila Skolimowska Memorial		13 Sep 2015	
7th	2016 Kamila Skolimowska Memorial		28 Aug 2016	
8th	2017 Kamila Skolimowska Memorial		15 Aug 2017	
9th	2018 Kamila Skolimowska Memorial		22 Aug 2018	
10th	2019 Kamila Skolimowska Memorial		14 Sep 2019	
11th	2020 Kamila Skolimowska Memorial	2020 World Athletics Continental Tour	6 Sep 2020	
12th	2021 Kamila Skolimowska Memorial	2021 World Athletics Continental Tour	5 Sep 2021	
13th	2022 Kamila Skolimowska Memorial	2022 Diamond League	6 Aug 2022	
14th	2023 Kamila Skolimowska Memorial	2023 Diamond League	16 Jul 2023	
15th	2024 Kamila Skolimowska Memorial	2024 Diamond League	25 Aug 2024	
16th	2025 Kamila Skolimowska Memorial	2025 Diamond League	15–16 Aug 2025	
17th	2026 Kamila Skolimowska Memorial	2026 Diamond League	22–23 Aug 2026	

== World records ==
Over the course of its history, three world records have been set at the Kamila Skolimowska Memorial.

World records set at the Kamila Skolimowska Memorial
Year	Event	Record	Athlete	Nationality
2016	Hammer throw	82.98 m	Anita Włodarczyk	Poland
2024	3000 m	7:17.55	Jakob Ingebrigtsen	Norway
2024	Pole vault	6.26 m	Armand Duplantis	Sweden

== Meeting records ==
=== Men ===
Men's meeting records of the Kamila Skolimowska Memorial
Event	Record	Athlete	Nationality	Date	Meet	Ref.
100 m	9.83 (+1.4 m/s)	Oblique Seville	Jamaica	23 August 2026	2026	
200 m	19.83	Letsile Tebogo	Botswana	25 August 2024	2024	
400 m	43.59	Busang Collen Kebinatshipi	Botswana	23 August 2026	2026	
800 m	1:41.86	Marco Arop	Canada	25 August 2024	2024	
1000 m	2:21.01	Marcin Lewandowski	Poland	14 September 2019	2019	
1500 m	3:27.14	Jakob Ingebrigtsen	Norway	16 July 2023	2023	
3000 m	7:17.55 WR	Jakob Ingebrigtsen	Norway	25 August 2024	2024	
110 m hurdles	13.03 (−0.5 m/s)	Orlando Ortega	Cuba	23 August 2014	2014	
110 m hurdles	13.03 (−0.5 m/s)	Cordell Tinch	United States	16 August 2025	2025	
400 m hurdles	46.28	Karsten Warholm	Norway	16 August 2025	2025	
3000 m steeplechase	8:02.74	Gemechu Godana	Ethiopia	23 August 2026	2026	
High jump	2.36 m	Mutaz Essa Barshim	Qatar	16 July 2023	2023	
Pole vault	6.26 m	Armand Duplantis	Sweden	25 August 2024	2024	
Long jump	8.13 m (+0.6 m/s)	Miltiadis Tentoglou	Greece	6 August 2022	2022	
Triple jump	17.53 m (±0.0 m/s)	Andy Díaz	Cuba	6 August 2022	2022	
Shot put	22.70 m	Ryan Crouser	United States	6 September 2020	2020	
Discus throw	72.58 m DLR	Mykolas Alekna	Lithuania	23 August 2026	2026	
Hammer throw	83.48 m	Paweł Fajdek	Poland	28 August 2014	2014	
Javelin throw	97.76 m	Johannes Vetter	Germany	6 September 2020	2020	
4 × 100 m relay	39.51	Ameer Webb; Kim Collins; Wallace Spearmon; Kamil Masztak	Invitational team	25 August 2013	2013	
4 × 400 m relay	3:01.46 DLR	Patrik Simon Enyingi; Zoltán Wahl; Csanad Csahóczi; Attila Molnár	Hungary	15 August 2025	2025	

=== Women ===
Women's meeting records of the Kamila Skolimowska Memorial
Event	Record	Athlete	Nationality	Date	Meet	Ref.
100 m	10.66 (+0.5 m/s)	Shelly-Ann Fraser-Pryce	Jamaica	6 August 2022	2022	
100 m	10.66 (+0.1 m/s)	Melissa Jefferson-Wooden	United States	16 August 2025	2025	
200 m	21.84 (+0.2 m/s)	Shericka Jackson	Jamaica	6 August 2022	2022	
300 m	35.76 DLR	Lurdes Gloria Manuel	Czech Republic	23 August 2026	2026	
400 m	48.66	Marileidy Paulino	Dominican Republic	25 August 2024	2024	
800 m	1:54.74	Keely Hodgkinson	Great Britain	16 August 2025	2025	
1000 m	2:31.24	Nelly Chepchirchir	Kenya	25 August 2024	2024	
1500 m	3:50.62	Gudaf Tsegay	Ethiopia	16 August 2025	2025	
3000 m	8:07.04 DLR	Faith Kipyegon	Kenya	16 August 2025	2025	
5000 m	14:54.09	Nadia Battocletti	Italy	23 August 2026	2026	
100 m hurdles	12.19 (+1.4 m/s)	Masai Russell	United States	16 August 2025	2025	
400 m hurdles	51.91	Femke Bol	Netherlands	16 August 2025	2025	
High jump	2.00 m	Yaroslava Mahuchikh	Ukraine	15 August 2025	2025	
High jump	2.00 m	Yaroslava Mahuchikh	Ukraine	23 August 2026	2026	
Pole vault	4.70 m	Marie-Julie Bonnin	France	15 August 2025	2025	
Long jump	6.98 m (+1.0 m/s)	Agate de Sousa	Portugal	22 August 2026	2026	
Long jump	6.98 m (+1.5 m/s)	Alyssa Jones	United States	22 August 2026	2026	
Triple jump	15.18 m (+0.3 m/s)	Yulimar Rojas	Venezuela	16 July 2023	2023	
Shot put	20.92 m	Chase Jackson	United States	22 August 2026	2026	
Discus throw	59.42 m	Joanna Wiśniewska	Poland	19 August 2012	2012	
Hammer throw	82.98 m WR	Anita Włodarczyk	Poland	28 August 2016	2016	
Javelin throw	67.04 m	Haruka Kitaguchi	Japan	16 July 2023	2023	

== See also ==
- Sport in Poland
- Copernicus Cup
- Janusz Kusociński Memorial
- Irena Szewińska Memorial
