= 2022 Kamila Skolimowska Memorial =

Diamond League meetings

- Dates: 6 August 2022
- Host city: Chorzów, Poland
- Venue: Silesian Stadium
- Level: 2022 Diamond League
- Events: 14 (DL events)

The 2022 Kamila Skolimowska Memorial was the 13th edition of the annual outdoor track and field meeting in Chorzów, Poland. Held on 6 August at the Silesian Stadium, it was the 9th leg of the 2022 Diamond League.

== Results ==
=== Diamond Discipline ===
Men's 100m (−0.7 m/s)
Place	Athlete	Country	Time	Points
1st place, gold medalist(s)	Trayvon Bromell	United States	9.95	8
2nd place, silver medalist(s)	Marvin Bracy	United States	10.00	7
3rd place, bronze medalist(s)	Ackeem Blake	Jamaica	10.00	6
4	Christian Coleman	United States	10.13	5
5	Yohan Blake	Jamaica	10.13	4
6	Elijah Hall	United States	10.14	3
7	Abdul Hakim Sani Brown	Japan	10.15	2
8	Akani Simbine	South Africa	10.21	1
9	Kyree King	United States	10.29	

Men's 400m
Place	Athlete	Country	Time	Points
1st place, gold medalist(s)	Michael Norman	United States	44.11	8
2nd place, silver medalist(s)	Kirani James	Grenada	44.55	7
3rd place, bronze medalist(s)	Bryce Deadmon	United States	44.68	6
4	Vernon Norwood	United States	45.20	5
5	Champion Allison	United States	45.35	4
6	Isaac Makwala	Botswana	45.42	3
7	Michael Cherry	United States	45.45	2
8	Liemarvin Bonevacia	Netherlands	45.50	1
9	Kajetan Duszyński	Poland	46.08	

Men's 400mH
Place	Athlete	Country	Time	Points
1st place, gold medalist(s)	Alison dos Santos	Brazil	47.80	8
2nd place, silver medalist(s)	Khallifah Rosser	United States	48.30	7
3rd place, bronze medalist(s)	Wilfried Happio	France	48.74	6
4	Amere Lattin	United States	48.79	5
5	Julien Watrin	Belgium	48.91	4
6	CJ Allen	United States	49.01	3
7	Nick Smidt	Netherlands	49.07	2
8	Sebastian Urbaniak	Poland	49.85	1
9	Ramsey Angela	Netherlands	50.98	

Men's Long Jump
Place	Athlete	Country	Mark	Points
1st place, gold medalist(s)	Miltiadis Tentoglou	Greece	8.13 m (+0.6 m/s)	8
2nd place, silver medalist(s)	Steffin McCarter	United States	8.09 m (−0.1 m/s)	7
3rd place, bronze medalist(s)	Maykel Massó	Cuba	8.09 m (+0.1 m/s)	6
4	Marquis Dendy	United States	8.09 m (−0.2 m/s)	5
5	Emiliano Lasa	Uruguay	7.78 m (−0.2 m/s)	4
6	Filippo Randazzo	Italy	7.63 m (+1.0 m/s)	3
7	Piotr Tarkowski	Poland	7.59 m (+0.2 m/s)	2
—	Ruswahl Samaai	South Africa	NM	

Men's Triple Jump
Place	Athlete	Country	Mark	Points
1st place, gold medalist(s)	Andy Díaz	Cuba	17.53 m (±0.0 m/s)	8
2nd place, silver medalist(s)	Pedro Pichardo	Portugal	17.29 m (−0.6 m/s)	7
3rd place, bronze medalist(s)	Zhu Yaming	China	17.25 m (−1.2 m/s)	6
4	Donald Scott	United States	16.44 m (−0.6 m/s)	5
5	Hugues Fabrice Zango	Burkina Faso	16.42 m (−1.1 m/s)	4
6	Christian Taylor	United States	16.18 m (−1.8 m/s)	3
7	Lázaro Martínez	Cuba	16.16 m (−0.2 m/s)	2
8	Chris Benard	United States	15.85 m (−1.2 m/s)	1

Men's Javelin Throw
Place	Athlete	Country	Mark	Points
1st place, gold medalist(s)	Jakub Vadlejch	Czech Republic	86.68 m	8
2nd place, silver medalist(s)	Julian Weber	Germany	84.94 m	7
3rd place, bronze medalist(s)	Curtis Thompson	United States	82.39 m	6
4	Patriks Gailums	Latvia	78.22 m	5
5	Gatis Čakšs	Latvia	77.14 m	4
6	Manu Quijera	Spain	76.41 m	3
7	Marcin Krukowski	Poland	73.91 m	2
8	Leandro Ramos	Portugal	68.94 m	1

Women's 100m (+0.5 m/s)
Place	Athlete	Country	Time	Points
1st place, gold medalist(s)	Shelly-Ann Fraser-Pryce	Jamaica	10.66	8
2nd place, silver medalist(s)	Aleia Hobbs	United States	10.94	7
3rd place, bronze medalist(s)	Marie-Josée Ta Lou	Ivory Coast	11.00	6
4	Gina Lückenkemper	Germany	11.10	5
5	Briana Williams	Jamaica	11.11	4
6	Kayla White	United States	11.15	3
7	Melissa Jefferson	United States	11.18	2
8	Twanisha Terry	United States	11.20	1
9	Natasha Morrison	Jamaica	11.20	

Women's 200m (+0.2 m/s)
Place	Athlete	Country	Time	Points
1st place, gold medalist(s)	Shericka Jackson	Jamaica	21.84	8
2nd place, silver medalist(s)	Shaunae Miller-Uibo	Bahamas	22.35	7
3rd place, bronze medalist(s)	Jenna Prandini	United States	22.39	6
4	Tynia Gaither	Bahamas	22.70	5
5	Ida Karstoft	Denmark	22.80	4
6	Tamara Clark	United States	22.82	3
7	Gabrielle Thomas	United States	22.86	2
8	Vitória Cristina Rosa	Brazil	22.89	1
9	Nikola Horowska	Poland	23.44	

Women's 400m
Place	Athlete	Country	Time	Points
1st place, gold medalist(s)	Femke Bol	Netherlands	49.75	8
2nd place, silver medalist(s)	Natalia Kaczmarek	Poland	49.86	7
3rd place, bronze medalist(s)	Candice McLeod	Jamaica	50.22	6
4	Stephenie Ann McPherson	Jamaica	50.31	5
5	Anna Kiełbasińska	Poland	50.57	4
6	Fiordaliza Cofil	Dominican Republic	51.36	3
7	Corinna Schwab	Germany	51.72	2
8	Kyra Jefferson	United States	51.93	1
9	Justyna Święty-Ersetic	Poland	52.10	

Women's 800m
Place	Athlete	Country	Time	Points
1st place, gold medalist(s)	Ajeé Wilson	United States	1:58.28	8
2nd place, silver medalist(s)	Sage Hurta	United States	1:58.40	7
3rd place, bronze medalist(s)	Anita Horvat	Slovenia	1:58.96	6
4	Elena Bellò	Italy	1:58.97	5
5	Allie Wilson	United States	1:59.35	4
6	Christina Hering	Germany	1:59.51	3
7	Adrianna Topolnicka	Poland	1:59.86	2
8	Lore Hoffmann	Switzerland	2:00.76	1
	Brooke Feldmeier	United States	DNF	
	Aneta Lemiesz	Poland	DNF	

Women's 1500m
Place	Athlete	Country	Time	Points
1st place, gold medalist(s)	Diribe Welteji	Ethiopia	3:56.91	8
2nd place, silver medalist(s)	Gudaf Tsegay	Ethiopia	3:58.18	7
3rd place, bronze medalist(s)	Hirut Meshesha	Ethiopia	4:00.93	6
4	Heather MacLean	United States	4:01.38	5
5	Sofia Ennaoui	Poland	4:01.39	4
6	Axumawit Embaye	Ethiopia	4:01.56	3
7	Netsanet Desta	Ethiopia	4:01.83	2
8	Adelle Tracey	Jamaica	4:02.36	1
9	Cory McGee	United States	4:02.85	
10	Eliza Megger	Poland	4:03.04	
11	Habitam Alemu	Ethiopia	4:03.53	
12	Kristiina Mäki	Czech Republic	4:05.01	
13	Josette Andrews	United States	4:05.08	
14	Lemlem Hailu	Ethiopia	4:09.89	
	Kendra Chambers	United States	DNF	
	Zoya Naumov	Spain	DNF	

Women's 3000m
Place	Athlete	Country	Time	Points
1st place, gold medalist(s)	Sifan Hassan	Netherlands	8:39.27	8
2nd place, silver medalist(s)	Ejgayehu Taye	Ethiopia	8:40.14	7
3rd place, bronze medalist(s)	Margaret Kipkemboi	Kenya	8:40.96	6
4	Alicia Monson	United States	8:41.61	5
5	Caroline Chepkoech Kipkirui	Kazakhstan	8:41.96	4
6	Gloria Kite	Kenya	8:42.33	3
7	Konstanze Klosterhalfen	Germany	8:42.34	2
8	Hawi Feysa	Ethiopia	8:42.45	1
9	Zerfe Wondemagegn	Ethiopia	8:43.33	
10	Maureen Koster	Netherlands	8:43.69	
11	Fantu Worku	Ethiopia	8:45.74	
12	Ayal Dagnachew	Ethiopia	8:47.10	
13	Diane van Es	Netherlands	8:49.55	
14	Viktória Wagner-Gyürkés	Hungary	8:50.31	
15	Laura Galván	Mexico	8:51.82	
16	Elena Burkard	Germany	8:53.54	
17	Beata Topka	Poland	8:57.20	
	Peninnah Wangari Wachira	Kenya	DNF	

Women's High Jump
Place	Athlete	Country	Mark	Points
1st place, gold medalist(s)	Safina Sadullayeva	Uzbekistan	1.92 m	8
2nd place, silver medalist(s)	Yaroslava Mahuchikh	Ukraine	1.92 m	7
3rd place, bronze medalist(s)	Kateryna Tabashnyk	Ukraine	1.88 m	6
4	Marija Vuković	Montenegro	1.88 m	5
5	Elena Vallortigara	Italy	1.88 m	4
6	Iryna Herashchenko	Ukraine	1.88 m	3
7	Nadezhda Dubovitskaya	Kazakhstan	1.88 m	2
8	Rachel McCoy	United States	1.84 m	1
9	Yuliya Levchenko	Ukraine	1.84 m	

Women's Shot Put
Place	Athlete	Country	Mark	Points
1st place, gold medalist(s)	Chase Ealey	United States	20.38 m	8
2nd place, silver medalist(s)	Jessica Schilder	Netherlands	19.84 m	7
3rd place, bronze medalist(s)	Sarah Mitton	Canada	19.44 m	6
4	Fanny Roos	Sweden	19.42 m	5
5	Auriol Dongmo	Portugal	19.27 m	4
6	Danniel Thomas-Dodd	Jamaica	19.13 m	3
7	Maggie Ewen	United States	18.50 m	2
8	Jessica Ramsey	United States	18.22 m	1

Women's Javelin Throw
Place	Athlete	Country	Mark	Points
1st place, gold medalist(s)	Haruka Kitaguchi	Japan	65.10 m	8
2nd place, silver medalist(s)	Barbora Špotáková	Czech Republic	62.29 m	7
3rd place, bronze medalist(s)	Liveta Jasiūnaitė	Lithuania	61.79 m	6
4	Kara Winger	United States	61.75 m	5
5	Elina Tzengko	Greece	61.72 m	4
6	Līna Mūze	Latvia	58.82 m	3
7	Sara Kolak	Croatia	56.68 m	2
8	Yulenmis Aguilar	Cuba	54.01 m	1

=== Promotional Events ===
Men's 800m
Place	Athlete	Country	Time
1st place, gold medalist(s)	Emmanuel Korir	Kenya	1:45.72
2nd place, silver medalist(s)	Ferguson Rotich	Kenya	1:45.76
3rd place, bronze medalist(s)	Tony van Diepen	Netherlands	1:45.80
4	Adrián Ben	Spain	1:45.89
5	Patryk Dobek	Poland	1:46.31
6	Bryce Hoppel	United States	1:46.35
7	Kyle Langford	Great Britain	1:46.65
8	Clayton Murphy	United States	1:46.79
9	Erik Sowinski	United States	1:47.30
10	Amel Tuka	Bosnia and Herzegovina	1:47.76
	Patryk Sieradzki	Poland	DNF

Men's Pole Vault
Place	Athlete	Country	Mark
1st place, gold medalist(s)	Armand Duplantis	Sweden	6.10 m
2nd place, silver medalist(s)	Sondre Guttormsen	Norway	5.73 m
3rd place, bronze medalist(s)	EJ Obiena	Philippines	5.73 m
4	Piotr Lisek	Poland	5.63 m
5	Chris Nilsen	United States	5.53 m
	Renaud Lavillenie	France	NM
	Thibaut Collet	France	NM
	Thiago Braz	Brazil	NM

Men's Shot Put
Place	Athlete	Country	Mark
1st place, gold medalist(s)	Joe Kovacs	United States	21.79 m
2nd place, silver medalist(s)	Tom Walsh	New Zealand	21.70 m
3rd place, bronze medalist(s)	Josh Awotunde	United States	21.35 m
4	Nick Ponzio	Italy	20.81 m
5	Michał Haratyk	Poland	20.53 m
6	Marcus Thomsen	Norway	19.81 m
7	Konrad Bukowiecki	Poland	19.76 m
8	Jakub Szyszkowski	Poland	19.17 m
	Darrell Hill	United States	NM

Men's Hammer Throw
Place	Athlete	Country	Mark
1st place, gold medalist(s)	Paweł Fajdek	Poland	81.27 m
2nd place, silver medalist(s)	Wojciech Nowicki	Poland	79.19 m
3rd place, bronze medalist(s)	Quentin Bigot	France	78.83 m
4	Eivind Henriksen	Norway	78.48 m

Women's 100mH (+0.8 m/s)
Place	Athlete	Country	Time
1st place, gold medalist(s)	Jasmine Camacho-Quinn	Puerto Rico	12.34
2nd place, silver medalist(s)	Kendra Harrison	United States	12.37
3rd place, bronze medalist(s)	Tia Jones	United States	12.49
4	Pia Skrzyszowska	Poland	12.51
5	Tonea Marshall	United States	12.70
6	Gabbi Cunningham	United States	12.74
7	Nia Ali	United States	12.76
8	Ditaji Kambundji	Switzerland	12.78
9	Chanel Brissett	United States	12.89

Women's 100mH Round 1
Place	Athlete	Country	Time	Heat
1	Jasmine Camacho-Quinn	Puerto Rico	12.51	1
2	Pia Skrzyszowska	Poland	12.58	2
3	Kendra Harrison	United States	12.64	2
4	Tia Jones	United States	12.68	1
5	Nia Ali	United States	12.78	2
6	Tonea Marshall	United States	12.83	2
7	Chanel Brissett	United States	12.95	2
8	Gabbi Cunningham	United States	12.97	1
9	Ditaji Kambundji	Switzerland	13.01	1
10	Sarah Lavin	Ireland	13.04	1
11	Mette Graversgaard	Denmark	13.11	2
12	Anne Zagré	Belgium	13.16	2
13	Klaudia Wojtunik	Poland	13.27	2
14	Marika Majewska	Poland	13.34	2
15	Adrianna Sułek	Poland	13.43	1
16	Anja Lukic	Serbia	13.54	1
17	Karolina Kołeczek	Poland	13.94	1
	Alaysha Johnson	United States	DNF	1

Women's Hammer Throw
Place	Athlete	Country	Mark
1st place, gold medalist(s)	Brooke Andersen	United States	75.76 m
2nd place, silver medalist(s)	Janee' Kassanavoid	United States	74.89 m
3rd place, bronze medalist(s)	Malwina Kopron	Poland	70.37 m
4	Bianca Ghelber	Romania	69.65 m

=== National Events ===
Women's 400m
Place	Athlete	Country	Time
1st place, gold medalist(s)	Kinga Gacka	Poland	52.62
2nd place, silver medalist(s)	Małgorzata Hołub-Kowalik	Poland	53.24
3rd place, bronze medalist(s)	Aleksandra Formella	Poland	53.86
4	Wiktoria Drozd	Poland	54.22
5	Julia Korzuch	Poland	54.51
6	Aleksandra Gaworska	Poland	54.79
7	Marlena Granaszewska	Poland	56.36
8	Julia Sokołowska	Poland	56.61
