= European Athletics Festival Bydgoszcz =

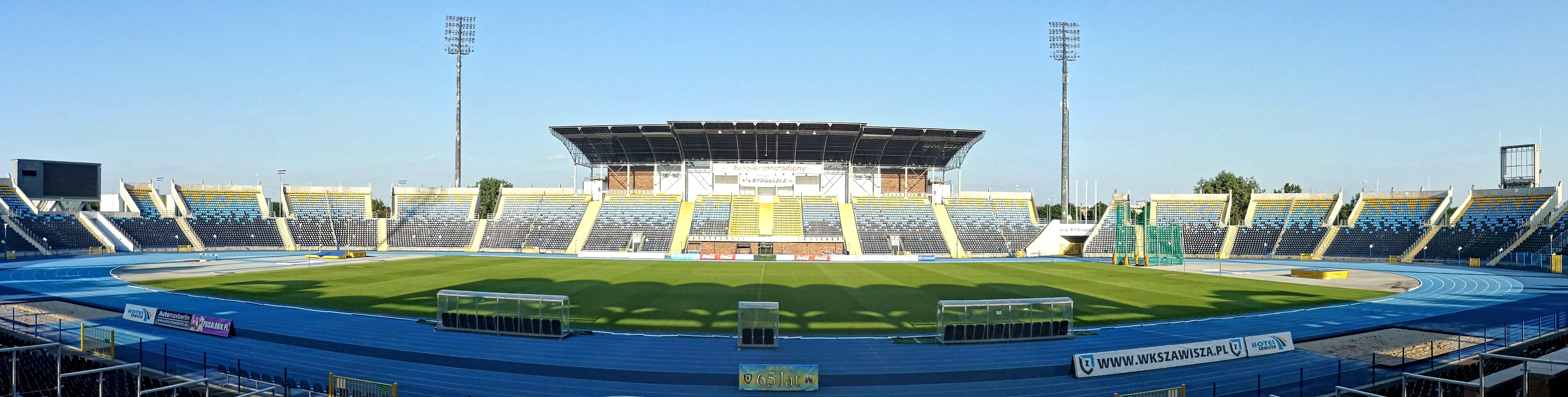
- The host stadium in Bydgoszcz
- Date: Early June
- Location: Bydgoszcz, Poland
- Event type: Track and field
- Established: 2001
- Last held: 2018

The European Athletics Festival Bydgoszcz was an annual track and field meeting held at the Zdzisław Krzyszkowiak Stadium in Bydgoszcz, Poland in early June.

The European Athletics Festival was first held in 2001. The meeting was part of the European Athletics Outdoor Premium Meetings series.

From 2019 it was replaced by the Irena Szewińska Memorial, so named in memory of Polish sprinter Irena Szewińska.

== World records ==
Over the course of its history, one world record was set at the European Athletics Festival Bydgoszcz.

Year	Event	Record	Athlete	Nationality
2010	Hammer throw	78.30 m	Anita Włodarczyk	Poland

== Meet records ==
=== Men ===
Men's meeting records of the European Athletics Festival Bydgoszcz
Event	Record	Athlete	Nationality	Date	Ref.
100 m	10.16	Dwain Chambers	Great Britain	8 June 2002	
100 m	10.16 (+1.6 m/s)	Sean McLean	United States	1 June 2017	
200 m	20.32	Dwight Thomas	Jamaica	10 June 2007	
400 m	45.74	Jamaal Torrance	United States	6 June 2010	
800 m	1:44.30	Adam Kszczot	Poland	3 June 2011	
1500 m	3:45.01	Patryk Kozłowski	Poland	29 May 2018	
110 m hurdles	13.26	Joel Brown	United States	3 June 2011	
400 m hurdles	48.71	L. J. van Zyl	South Africa	10 June 2009	
3000 m steeplechase	8:14.02	Tareq Mubarak Taher	Bahrain	10 June 2009	
High jump	2.34 m	Grzegorz Sposób	Poland	5 June 2004	
Pole vault	6.01 m	Yevgeniy Lukyanenko	Russia	1 July 2008	
Long jump	8.03 m	Vladimir Zyskov	Ukraine	5 June 2004	
Triple jump	17.52 m	Phillips Idowu	Great Britain	3 June 2011	
Shot put	21.50 m	Christian Cantwell	United States	6 June 2010	
Discus throw	69.43 m	Virgilijus Alekna	Lithuania	10 June 2007	
Hammer throw	82.30 m	Primos Kozmus	Slovenia	10 June 2007	
Javelin throw	80.42 m	Dmytro Kosynskyy	Ukraine	3 June 2011	
5000 m walk (track)	18:44.36	Robert Korzeniowski	Poland	15 June 2001	
4 × 100 m relay	38.84	Michał Krzeminski; Marcin Jędrusiński; Piotr Balcerzak; Ryszard Pilarczyk	Poland	15 June 2001	
4 × 400 m relay	3:02.17	Piotr Rysiukiewicz; Piotr Haczek; Piotr Długosielski; Robert Maćkowiak	Poland	15 June 2001	

=== Women ===
Women's meeting records of the European Athletics Festival Bydgoszcz
Event	Record	Athlete	Nationality	Date	Ref.
100 m	11.27	LaVerne Jones-Ferrette	U.S. Virgin Islands	1 July 2008	
200 m	22.51	Stephanie Durst	United States	10 June 2007	
400 m	51.67	Anyika Onuora	Great Britain	14 June 2015	
600 m	1:26.74	Joanna Jóźwik	Poland	1 June 2017	
800 m	1:59.75 (Note: 1:59.47 by meeting website)	Marilyn Okoro	Great Britain	3 June 2012	
1500 m	4:03.86	Olga Yegorova	Russia	1 June 2006	
100 m hurdles	12.81	Tatyana Dektyareva	Russia	1 July 2008	
400 m hurdles	54.08	Vania Stambolova	Bulgaria	3 June 2012	
High jump	2.05 m	Blanka Vlašić	Croatia	1 July 2008	
Pole vault	4.71 m	Anna Rogowska	Poland	1 June 2006	
Shot put	19.10 m	Krystyna Zabawska	Poland	14 June 2015	
Hammer throw	78.30 m	Anita Włodarczyk	Poland	6 June 2010	
Javelin throw	61.73 m	Nikola Ogrodniková	Czech Republic	29 May 2018	
4 × 100 m relay	43.13	O. Rajdasz; T. Shepetyk; M. Maydanova; A. Kravchenko	Ukraine	5 June 2004	
