= 2020 World Athletics Continental Tour =

- Organisers: World Athletics
- Edition: 1st

The 2020 World Athletics Continental Tour is an annual series of elite track and field athletic competitions, recognised by World Athletics (formerly known as the IAAF). The Tour forms the second tier of international one-day meetings after the Diamond League except in the 200m, 3000m steeplechase, discus, hammer and triple jump, where it forms the top-tier, these events having been removed from the Diamond League from 2020. 2020 was the series' inaugural season.

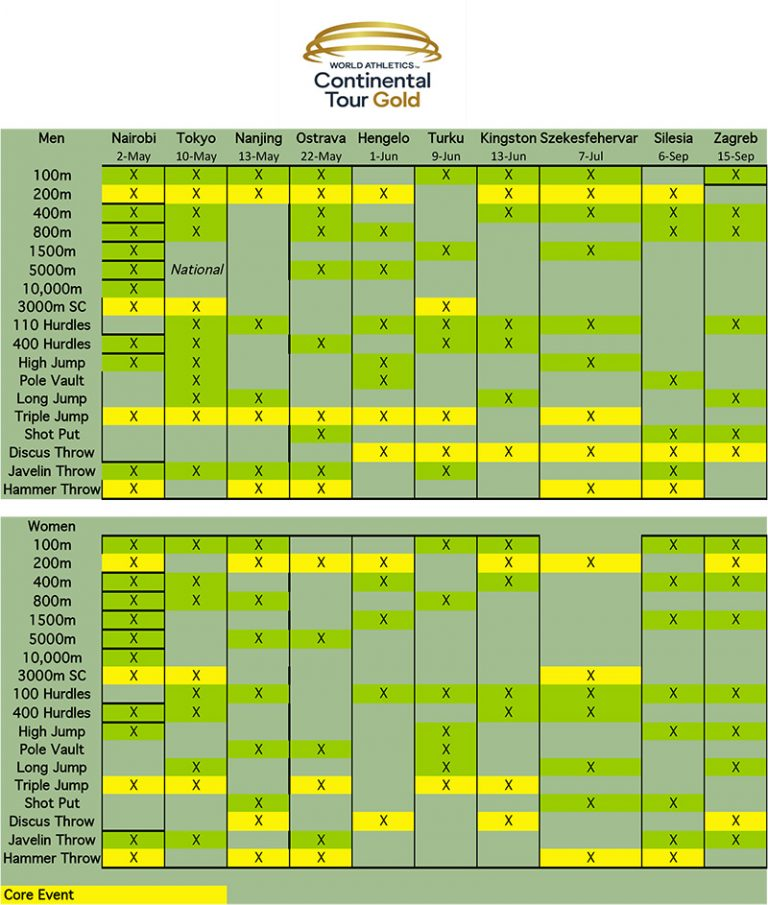
2020 World Athletics Continental Tour

== 2020 schedule ==
The Continental Tour will be divided into three levels – Gold, Silver and Bronze – whose status will be determined by the quality of competition and prize money on offer.

=== Continental Tour gold level schedule ===
2020 World Athletics Continental Tour - Gold Meeting calendar
Date	Meeting	City	Country
11 August	Paavo Nurmi Games	Turku	Finland
19 August	Gyulai István Memorial	Szekesfehervar	Hungary
23 August	Golden Grand Prix	Tokyo	Japan
6 September	Kamila Skolimowska Memorial	Chorzów	Poland
8 September	Ostrava Golden Spike	Ostrava	Czech Republic
15 September	Hanžeković Memorial	Zagreb	Croatia
3 October	Kip Keino Classic	Nairobi	Kenya

=== Continental Tour silver level schedule ===
2020 World Athletics Continental Tour - Silver Meeting calendar
Date	Meeting	City	Country
25 August	Janusz Kusociński Memorial	Chorzów	Poland
8 September	Palio Città della Quercia	Rovereto	Italy
11 September	P-T-S Meeting	Šamorín	Slovakia
13 September	ISTAF Berlin	Berlin	Germany
6 December	Grande Prêmio Brasil Caixa	Bragança Paulista	Brazil

=== Continental Tour bronze level schedule ===
2020 World Athletics Continental Tour - Bronze Meeting calendar
Date	Meeting	City	Country
22 February	Sydney Track Classic	Sydney	Australia
23 February	Sir Graeme Douglas International	Auckland	New Zealand
TBA	Michitaka Kinami Memorial Meet	Osaka	Japan
TBA	Denka Athletics Challenge Cup 2020	Niigata	Japan
8 June	Memorial Josefa Odlozila	Prague	Czech Republic
8 July	Karlstad GP	Karlstad	Sweden
TBA	Sunset Tour - UCLA	Los Angeles	United States
1 August	Kuortane Games	Kuortane	Finland
10 August	Sollentuna GP	Sollentuna	Sweden
12 August	Meeting Città di Padova	Padova	Italy
19 August	Irena Szewinska Memorial	Bydgoszcz	Poland
23 August	Meeting International de la Province de Liège	Liège	Belgium
29 August	Drake Blue Oval Showcase	Des Moines	United States
29 August	Göteborg Friidrott GP	Gothenburg	Sweden
3 September	Meeting de Marseille	Marseille	France
6 September	Nacht Van de Atletiek	Heusden	Belgium
8 September	International Leichtathletik Meeting "Anhalt 2020"	Dessau-Roßlau	Germany
15 September	Galà dei Castelli	Bellinzona	Switzerland
16 September	Kladno Hazi a Kladenske Memorialy	Kladno	Czech Republic

== Events cancelled ==
=== Continental Tour gold level schedule ===
2020 World Athletics Continental Tour - Gold Meeting calendar
Meeting	City	Country
2020 Nanjing Continental Tour Meeting	Nanjing	China
FBK Games	Hengelo	Netherlands
Racers Adidas Grand Prix	Kingston	Jamaica

=== Continental Tour silver level schedule ===
2020 World Athletics Continental Tour - Silver Meeting calendar
Meeting	City	Country
Queensland Track Classic	Brisbane	Australia
Grenada International Invitational	St. George's	Grenada
Drake Relays	Des Moines	United States
Florida Invitational	Miramar	United States
Meeting Madrid 2020	Madrid	Spain
Spitzen Leichtathletik Luzern	Luzern	Switzerland
Jamaica International Invitational	Kingston	Jamaica

=== Continental Tour bronze level schedule ===
2020 World Athletics Continental Tour - Bronze Meeting calendar
Meeting	City	Country
Oda Memorial Meet	Hiroshima	Japan
Shizuoka International Meet	Fukuroi	Japan
Meeting Stanislas	Nancy	France
Meeting Int. d'Athletisme Grande Caraibe - Region Guadeloupe	Baie Mahault	France
Meeting Jaen Paraiso Interior	Andújar	Spain
Trond Mohn Games	Bergen	Norway
Venizelia	Chania	Greece
Joensuu Games	Joensuu	Finland
Aliann Pompey Invitational	Georgetown	Guyana
Meeting Iberoamericano	Huelva	Spain
Athleticagenève - Memorial Georges Caillat	Genève	Switzerland
XXX Qosanov Memorial	Almaty	Kazakhstan
Copenhagen Athletics Games	Copenhagen	Denmark
Meeting International de Montreuil	Montreuil	France
Meeting International de Sotteville	Sotteville-lès-Rouen	France
56. International Pfingstsportfest	Rehlingen	Germany
Citius Meeting	Bern	Switzerland
