= Kateryna Tabashnyk =

Ukrainian high jumper (born 1994)

Personal information
- Native name: Катери́на Олекса́ндрівна Та́башник
- Full name: Kateryna Oleksandrivna Tabashnyk
- Born: 15 June 1994 (age 32) Kharkiv, Ukraine
- Height: 1.78 m (5 ft 10 in)
- Weight: 62 kg (137 lb)

Sport
- Country: Ukraine
- Sport: Track and field
- Event: High jump

Achievements and titles
- Regional finals: European U20 champion; Ibero-American Championships winner; In Top 8 at European Championships; European Indoor Championships bronze medalist
- Highest world ranking: 5
- Personal best: 1.99 metres
Medal record
Women's athletics
Representing Ukraine
European Indoor Championships
Bronze medal – third place	2023 Istanbul	High jump
European Junior Championships
Gold medal – first place	2013 Rieti	High jump

Kateryna Oleksandrivna Tabashnyk (Ukrainian: Катери́на Олекса́ндрівна Та́башник; born 15 June 1994) is a Ukrainian high jumper who formerly competed in the heptathlon. She is a former European U20 champion, Ibero-American Championships winner, European Indoor Championships bronze medalist, and Top 8 at the European Championships.

== Family ==
In July 2022, The New York Times reported that Tabashnyk said her family’s apartment in Kharkiv, Ukraine, was struck by a Russian Army rocket that injured her 8-year-old nephew, who was hospitalized, and had one of his kidneys removed.

On 18 August 2022 shelling of Kharkiv by the Russian Armed Forces killed Kateryna's mother.

== Career ==
Tabashnyk is a former European U20 champion, Ibero-American Championships winner, European Indoor Championships bronze medalist, and Top 8 at the European Championships.

=== 2013-19 ===
Tabashnyk competed in high jump without reaching the final at the 2011 World Youth Championships, and the 2013 European Indoor Championships.

In May 2012 at the Ukrainian Junior Championships in Yalta, Tabashnyk came in 4th place.

Tabashnyk then won the gold medal at the 2013 European Junior Championships.

In June 2017 she won a bronze medal at the Paavo Nurmi Games in Turku, Finland, in Women's high jump.

In August 2018 Tabashnyk won the high jump with a 1.90 metre jump at the European Athletics Championships in Berlin, Germany.

On 28 March 2019 in Antalya (Turkey) she tested positive for the diuretic hydrochlorothiazide, a prohibited substance under the WADA 2019. On 13 January 2020 the Athletics Integrity Unit disqualified her for 19 months from 28 March 2019.

=== 2020-present ===
In February 2022 she won the Meeting International de Montreuil in Women's high jump. In May 2022 with a high jump of 1.90 Tabashnyk won the Ibero American Championships in La Nucia, Spain. In June 2022 she won the AtletiCAGenève - EAP in Women's high jump. In August 2022 she won a bronze medal at the 2022 Kamila Skolimowska Memorial.

In March 2023 Tabashnyk won a bronze medal at the European Indoor Championships, in Women's high jump.

=== Personal bests ===
Tabashnyk's personal best high jump is 1.99 metres, achieved indoors on 26 January 2019 in Hustopeče, Czech Republic.

Her highest world ranking in women's high jump has been fifth place.

== See also ==
- List of European Athletics Indoor Championships medalists (women)
