= Irena Szewińska Memorial =

Annual track and field meeting

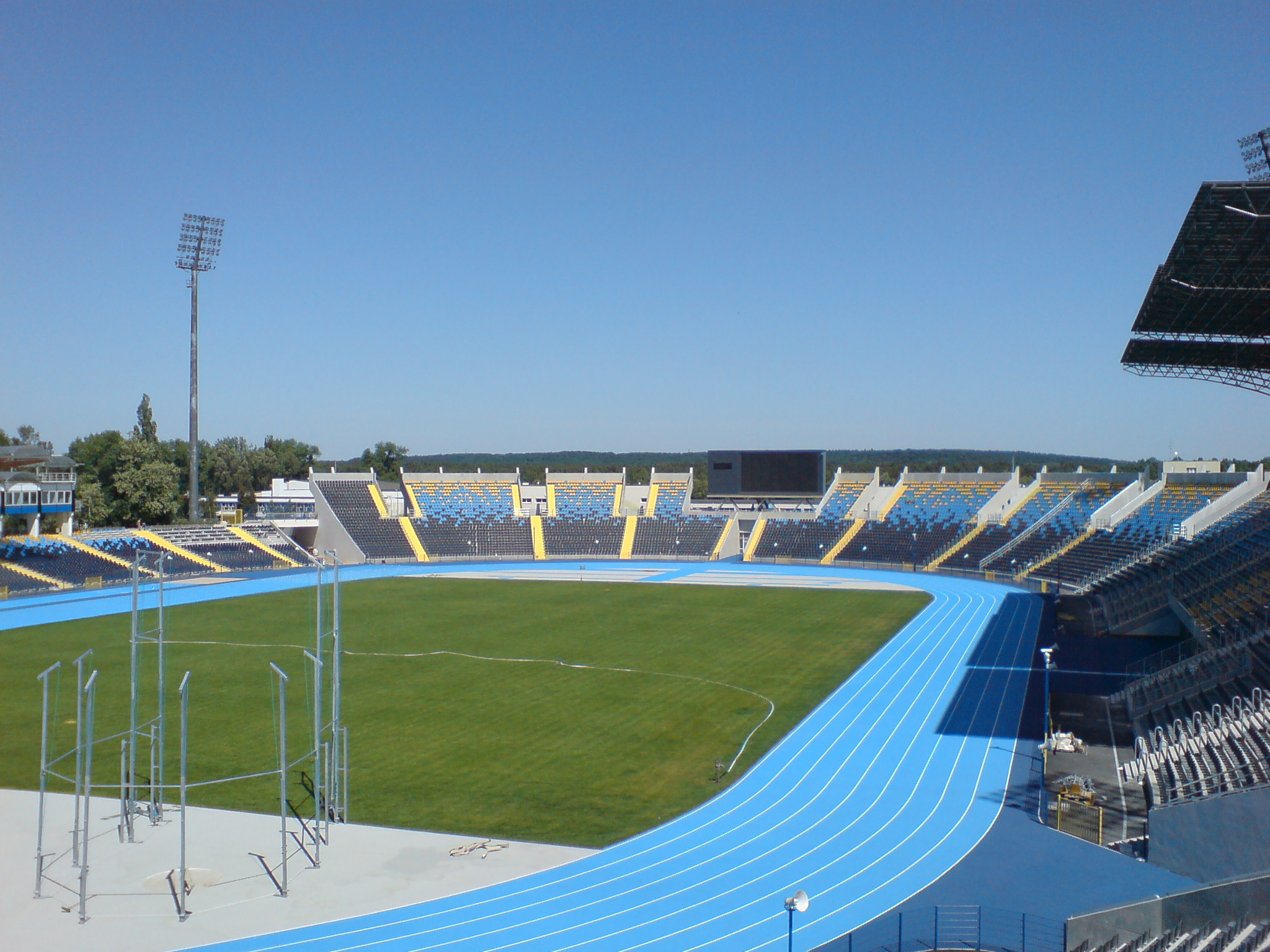
- The host stadium in Bydgoszcz
- Date: July
- Location: Bydgoszcz, Poland
- Event type: Track and field
- Website: bydgoszczcup.pl

The Irena Szewińska Memorial is an annual track and field meeting held at the Zdzislaw Krzyszkowiak Stadium in Bydgoszcz, Poland in July.

It was first held in 2019 as replacement for the XIX European Athletics Festival "Bydgoszcz Cup". The event was named after Polish sprinter Irena Szewińska to honor her memory.

The meeting was part of the inaugural 2020 World Athletics Continental Tour on bronze level and reached gold standard at the tour in 2021.

== Meet records ==
=== Men ===
Men's meeting records of the Irena Szewińska Memorial
Event	Record	Athlete	Nationality	Date	Ref.
100 m	10.02 (−0.3 m/s)	Elijah Hall	United States	3 June 2022	
200 m	19.95 (+0.7 m/s)	Erriyon Knighton	United States	6 June 2023	
400 m	45.04	Jonas Phijffers	Netherlands	29 May 2026	
800 m	1:44.08	Andreas Kramer	Sweden	20 June 2024	
1500 m	3:33.30	Mohamed Attaoui	Spain	30 May 2025	
2000 m	4:55.44	Matthew Ramsden	Australia	19 August 2020	
110 m hurdles	13.07 (+1.6 m/s)	Kendry Menéndez	Cuba	29 May 2026	
400 m hurdles	48.23	Khallifah Rosser	United States	3 June 2022	
3000 m steeplechase	8:14.02	Tareq Mubarak Taher	Bahrain	10 June 2009	
Pole vault	5.97 m	Ernest Obiena	Philippines	20 June 2024	
Shot put	22.38 m	Leonardo Fabbri	Italy	20 June 2024	
Hammer throw	82.77 m	Paweł Fajdek	Poland	30 June 2021	
Javelin throw	84.57 m	Douw Smit	South Africa	29 May 2026	

=== Women ===
Women's meeting records of the Irena Szewińska Memorial
Event	Record	Athlete	Nationality	Date	Ref.
100 m	11.17 (+0.1 m/s)	Michelle-Lee Ahye	Trinidad and Tobago	3 June 2022	
100 m	11.17 (+0.4 m/s)	Zoe Hobbs	New Zealand	20 June 2024	
200 m	22.23 (+0.8 m/s)	Daryll Neita	Great Britain	6 June 2023	
400 m	49.86	Natalia Kaczmarek	Poland	20 June 2024	
400 m	48.54 X (Note: mark was unratified because organisers did not arrange for doping control)	Christine Mboma	Namibia	30 June 2021	
800 m	1:57.25	Audrey Werro	Switzerland	30 May 2025	
1500 m	3:58.69	Freweyni Hailu	Ethiopia	20 June 2024	
3000 m	8:56.79	Roxana Birca	Romania	3 June 2011	
100 m hurdles	12.41 (+1.9 m/s)	Alaysha Johnson	United States	6 June 2023	
400 m hurdles	54.08	Vania Stombolova	Bulgaria	3 June 2012	
3000 m steeplechase	9:14.90	Marwa Bouzayani	Tunisia	30 May 2025	
High jump	2.05 m	Blanka Vlasic	Croatia	1 July 2008	
Pole vault	4.71 m	Anna Rogowska	Poland	6 June 2010	
Long jump	6.66 m (+0.6 m/s)	Tatyana Kotova	Russia	6 June 2010	
Triple jump	14.41 m (+1.7 m/s)	Anna Pyatykh	Russia	10 June 2009	
Shot put	19.20 m	Fanny Roos	Sweden	30 May 2025	
Discus throw	63.52 m	Kateryna Karsak	Ukraine	3 June 2011	
Hammer throw	78.79 m	Brooke Andersen	United States	6 June 2023	
Javelin throw	61.73 m	Nikola Ogrodnikova	Czech Republic	29 May 2018	
4 × 100 m relay	43.13	Oksana Rajdusz; Irina Shepetyuk; Marina Maydanova; Anzhela Kravchenko	Ukraine	5 June 2004	
4 × 400 m relay	3:29.17	Natalya Khrushchelyova; Yuliya Pechonkina; Olesya Zykina; Irina Rosikhina	Russia	15 June 2001	

== See also ==
- Sport in Poland
