= Payton Otterdahl =

American shot putter

Personal information
- Born: April 2, 1996 (age 30) Rosemount, Minnesota, U.S.
- Height: 6 ft 4 in (193 cm)

Sport
- Country: United States
- Sport: Athletics
- Event: Shot put
- College team: North Dakota State University
- Club: ASICS
- Coached by: Justin St. Clair

Achievements and titles
- Personal bests: Shot put outdoor: 22.59 m (2024); Shot put indoor: 21.81 m (2019)

Payton Otterdahl (born April 2, 1996) is an American male shot putter who competed in the 2020 Summer Olympics and the 2024 Summer Olympics.

== Biography ==
Payton Otterdahl was born to Cory and Shannon Otterdahl and grew up in Rosemount, Minnesota. After graduating from Rosemount High School, he attended North Dakota State University from 2014 to 2018. His senior season culminated in him sweeping the NCAA titles in indoor throwing events, becoming only the 2nd man to ever win the shot put and weight throw at the NCAA Championships. In winter 2019, at 23 years, his explosion, with 2nd world best measure (his personal best 21.81 m at time) in the world top lists IAAF and the 25th place in the new IAAF World Rankings.

== Professional career ==
=== 2020 Olympics ===
In 2021 at the age of 25, Otterdahl took third at the 2020 USA Olympic Trials in order to qualify for the United States Olympic team. Otterdahl's throw of 21.92m was enough to compete in the Olympics alongside teammates Joe Kovacs (22.34m) and Ryan Crouser (23.37m). In the qualifying rounds, Otterdahl squeaked into the finals with a throw of 20.90m. Despite making the finals, Otterdahl struggled at ended up 10th place with a throw of 20.32m.

=== 2023 World Athletics Championships ===
In 2023 at the age of 27, Otterdahl qualified for the 2023 World Athletic Championships. In the qualifying round, Otterdahl's second throw of 21.54m in the qualifying round automatically qualified him for the final. Otterdahl finished 5th overall with a throw of 21.86m. This was Otterdahl's first major championship top five finish.

=== 2024 Olympics ===
At the 2024 USA Olympic Trials, Otterdahl once again took third place behind both Ryan Crouser and Joe Kovacs. Otterdahl's fifth round throw of 22.26m moved him above Jordan Giest (21.79m) for his second Olympic appearance. In the qualifying rounds for the 2024 Olympics, Otterdhal's throw of 21.52m automatically qualified him for the Olympic final. Otterdahl's throw of 22.03m resulted in him taking fourth overall at the 2024 Olympics.

== Personal best ==
- Shot put (Outdoor): 22.59 m, (United States) Drake Relays, Des Moines, April 24, 2024
- Shot put (Indoor): 21.81 m, (United States) Summit League Championships, February 23, 2019
