= 2025 European Athletics Indoor Championships – Women's 1500 metres =

Women's 1500 metres at the 2025 European Athletics Indoor Championships
- Venue: Omnisport Apeldoorn
- Location: Apeldoorn, Netherlands
- Dates: 6 March 2025 (round 1); 7 March 2025 (final)
- Competitors: 22 from 13 nations
- Winning time: 4:07.23

Medalists
gold medal	Agathe Guillemot	France
silver medal	Salomé Afonso	Portugal
bronze medal	Revee Walcott-Nolan	Great Britain

The women's 1500 metres at the 2025 European Athletics Indoor Championships was held on the short track of Omnisport in Apeldoorn, Netherlands, on 6 and 7 March 2025. This was the 37th time the event was contested at the European Athletics Indoor Championships. Athletes can qualify by achieving the entry standard or by their World Athletics Ranking in the event.

Round 1 is scheduled for 6 March during the evening session. The final is scheduled for 7 March during the evening session.

== Background ==
The women's 1500 metres was contested 36 times before 2025, held every time since the second edition of the European Athletics Indoor Championships (1971–2023). The 2025 European Athletics Indoor Championships will be held in Omnisport Apeldoorn in Apeldoorn, Netherlands. The removable indoor athletics track was retopped for these championships in September 2024.

Gudaf Tsegay is the world record holder in the event, with a time of 3:53.09 set in 2021. Abeba Aregawi is the European record holder with a time of 3:57.91, set in 2014. The championship record is held by Laura Muir, set at the 2017 championships. Muir is also the defending European Indoor champion.

Records before the 2025 European Athletics Indoor Championships
Record	Athlete (nation)	Time (s)	Location	Date
World record	Gudaf Tsegay (ETH)	3:53.09	Liévin, France	9 February 2021
European record	Abeba Aregawi (SWE)	3:57.91	Stockholm, Sweden	6 February 2014
Championship record	Laura Muir (GBR)	4:02.39	Belgrade, Serbia	4 March 2017
World leading	Gudaf Tsegay (ETH)	3:53.92	Toruń, Poland	16 February 2025
European leading	Georgia Bell (GBR)	4:00.63	Birmingham, Great Britain	15 February 2025

== Qualification ==
For the women's 1500 metres, the qualification period runs from 25 February 2024 until 23 February 2025. Athletes can qualify by achieving the entry standards of 4:08.00 s indoors or 4:02.00 s outdoor, or by virtue of their World Athletics Ranking for the event. There is a target number of 27 athletes.

== Rounds ==
=== Round 1 ===
Round 1 was held on 6 March, starting at 19:10 (UTC+1) in the evening. First 3 in each heat (Q) qualify for the final.

==== Heat 1 ====
Rank	Athlete	Nation	Time	Notes
1	Bérénice Cleyet-Merle	France	4:13.51	Q
2	Weronika Lizakowska	Poland	4:13.51	Q
3	Patricia Silva	Portugal	4:13.93	Q
4	Marina Martínez	Spain	4:14.86	
5	Elise Vanderelst	Belgium	4:16.68	
6	Ava Lloyd	Great Britain	4:18.74	
7	Hannah Anderson	Finland	4:22.98	
8	Koraini Kyriakopoulou	Greece	4:25.82	

==== Heat 2 ====
Rank	Athlete	Nation	Time	Notes
1	Georgia Bell	Great Britain	4:11.31	Q
2	Agathe Guillemot	France	4:11.52	Q
3	Salomé Afonso	Portugal	4:11.82	Q
4	Kristiina Sasínek Mäki	Czech Republic	4:12.60	
5	Sofia Thøgersen	Denmark	4:14.02	
6	Suus Altorf	Netherlands	4:15.09	
7	Ingeborg Østgård	Norway	4:22.98	

==== Heat 3 ====
Rank	Athlete	Nation	Time	Notes
1	Esther Guerrero	Spain	4:14.21	Q
2	Revée Walcott-Nolan	Great Britain	4:14.38	Q
3	Joceline Wind	Switzerland	4:14.51	Q
4	Marissa Damink	Netherlands	4:15.16	
5	Diana Mezuliáníková	Czech Republic	4:18.29	
6	Anne Gine Løvnes	Norway	4:18.50	
7	Marta Zenoni	Italy	4:19.50	

=== Final ===
The final was held on 7 March, starting at 21:00 (UTC+1) in the evening.

Rank	Athlete	Nation	Time	Notes
1st place, gold medalist(s)	Agathe Guillemot	France	4:07.23	
2nd place, silver medalist(s)	Salomé Afonso	Portugal	4:07.66	
3rd place, bronze medalist(s)	Revée Walcott-Nolan	Great Britain	4:08.45 [.442]	
4	Georgia Bell	Great Britain	4:08.45 [.443]	
5	Esther Guerrero	Spain	4:09.45	
6	Weronika Lizakowska	Poland	4:09.64	
7	Patricia Silva	Portugal	4:09.97	
8	Joceline Wind	Switzerland	4:10.42	
9	Bérénice Cleyet-Merle	France	4:10.60	
