= 2026 World Athletics Indoor Championships – Women's 1500 metres =

Women's 1500 metres at the 2026 World Athletics Indoor Championships
- Venue: Kujawsko-Pomorska Arena Toruń
- Location: Toruń, Poland
- Dates: 20 March (round 1); 22 March (final)
- Winning time: 3:58.53 WL

Medalists
gold medal	Georgia Hunter Bell	Great Britain
silver medal	Jessica Hull	Australia
bronze medal	Nikki Hiltz	United States

The women's 1500 metres at the 2026 World Athletics Indoor Championships took place on the short track of the Kujawsko-Pomorska Arena Toruń in Toruń, Poland, on 20 and 22 March 2026. This was the 22nd time the event was contested at the World Athletics Indoor Championships. Athletes could qualify by achieving the entry standard or by their World Athletics Ranking in the event.

== Background ==
The women's 1500 metres was contested 21 times before 2026, at every previous edition of the World Athletics Indoor Championships.

Records before the 2026 World Athletics Indoor Championships
Record	Athlete (nation)	Time (s)	Location	Date
World record	Gudaf Tsegay (ETH)	3:53.09	Liévin, France	9 February 2021
Championship record	Gudaf Tsegay (ETH)	3:54.86	Nanjing, China	23 March 2025
2026 World Lead	Elle St. Pierre (USA)	3:59.33	Boston, United States	14 February 2026

== Qualification ==
For the women's 1500 metres, the qualification period ran from 1 November 2025 until 8 March 2026. Athletes could qualify by achieving the entry standard of 4:06.00 s. Athletes could also qualify by virtue of their World Athletics Ranking for the event or by virtue of their World Athletics Indoor Tour wildcard. There is a target number of 30 athletes.

== Results ==
=== Round 1 ===
Round 1 was held on 20 March, starting at 18:22 (UTC+1) in the evening. Qualification: First 3 of each heat (Q) qualify to Final.

==== Heat 1 ====
Place	Athlete	Nation	Time	Notes
1	Agathe Guillemot	France	4:16.25	Q
2	Nikki Hiltz	United States	4:16.32	Q
3	Ludovica Cavalli	Italy	4:16.45	Q
4	Gabija Galvydytė	Lithuania	4:17.28	
5	Wilma Nielsen	Sweden	4:17.48	
6	Nele Weßel	Germany	4:19.92	
7	Vera Bertemes-Hoffmann	Luxembourg	4:21.90	
8	Aníta Hinriksdóttir	Iceland	4:23.17	

==== Heat 2 ====
Place	Athlete	Nation	Time	Notes
1	Birke Haylom	Ethiopia	4:10.66	Q
2	Klaudia Kazimierska	Poland	4:11.66	Q
3	Susan Lokayo Ejore-Sanders	Kenya	4:11.41	Q
4	Jemma Reekie	Great Britain	4:11.61	
5	Lucia Stafford	Canada	4:12.81	
6	Delia Sclabas	Switzerland	4:14.27	
7	Adèle Gay	France	4:15.26	
8	Gresa Bakraçi	Kosovo	4:29.64	

==== Heat 3 ====
Place	Athlete	Nation	Time	Notes
1	Georgia Hunter Bell	Great Britain	4:12.09	Q
2	Jessica Hull	Australia	4:12.45	Q
3	Gracie Morris	United States	4:12.57	Q
4	Joceline Wind	Switzerland	4:12.96	
5	Marta Zenoni	Italy	4:13.17	
6	Salomé Afonso	Portugal	4:13.26	
7	Anne Gine Løvnes	Norway	4:16.89	
8	Gina McNamara	Malta	4:30.19	

=== Final ===
The final was held on 22 March, starting at 19:22 (UTC+1) in the evening.

Rank	Name	Nationality	Time	Notes
1st place, gold medalist(s)	Georgia Hunter Bell	Great Britain	3:58.53	WL
2nd place, silver medalist(s)	Jessica Hull	Australia	3:59.45	AR
3rd place, bronze medalist(s)	Nikki Hiltz	United States	3:59.68	PB
4	Agathe Guillemot	France	3:59.71	NR
5	Birke Haylom	Ethiopia	4:01.34	
6	Klaudia Kazimierska	Poland	4:02.80	
7	Gracie Morris	United States	4:03.75	
8	Susan Lokayo Ejore-Sanders	Kenya	4:04.05	SB
9	Ludovica Cavalli	Italy	4:10.10	
