= Athletics at the 2024 Summer Olympics – Women's 1500 metres =

Women's 1500 metres at the Games of the XXXIII Olympiad
- Venue: Stade de France, Paris, France
- Dates: 6 August 2024 (heats); 7 August 2024 (repechage round); 8 August 2024 (semi-finals); 10 August 2024 (final)
- Winning time: 3:51.29 OR

Medalists
1st place, gold medalist(s)		Faith Kipyegon	Kenya
2nd place, silver medalist(s)		Jessica Hull	Australia
3rd place, bronze medalist(s)		Georgia Bell	Great Britain

The women's 1500 metres at the 2024 Summer Olympics was held in four rounds at the Stade de France in Paris, France, between 6 and 10 August 2024. This was the fourteenth time the women's 1500 metres was contested at the Summer Olympics. A total of 45 athletes were able to participate after qualifying by entry standard or their World Athletics Ranking.

== Summary ==
As the two time defending Olympic champion, two time reigning World Champion and world record holder, improving her own previous world record Just a month before the Olympics, Faith Kipyegon had all the check marks. The returning silver medalist is Laura Muir, who was also bronze medalist at the 2022 World Championships. Returning bronze medalist Sifan Hassan was on a different agenda, running the 10,000 metres just 40 minutes after the start of this race and the Marathon, starting less than 36 hours later. Hassan also took bronze in 2023 behind silver medalist Diribe Welteji, while the 2022 silver medalist was Gudaf Tsegay. Earlier in the season, Jessica Hull became the #5 performer in history, while chasing Kipyegon to her world record. Two and a half months earlier, Tsegay became #4 virtually unassisted, beating Birke Haylom by 3 seconds. Haylom did not make the final.

As the final started, Tsegay ran out of the field, bumping elbows with Agathe Guillemot, to take the lead 100 metres in. Elle St. Pierre dropped in behind her. After running the first lap in 59.23, Tsegay opened up a small gap. Kipyegon moved up through the pack to fill the gap with Welteji positioning herself on Kipyegon's shoulder. Reaching 700 metres in 1:46.9, four runners had already fallen off the back including Muir. Hull moved up behind Welteji. 800 in 2:03.27, everyone waiting for the first move, Hull racing just to get back to the pack. The move happened 50 metres before the bell when Kipyegon accelerated around Tsegay. In elite invitational races, the meet director frequently employs at least one paid rabbit to sacrifice their chance to win in order to run at a fast pace to set up the runners behind them. Championship races usually are run slowly because there is no paid rabbit. Here Tsegay's fast early pace had served the role perfectly for Kipyegon. Tsegay was no longer a factor. Kipyegon hit the bell at 2:51.7 with Hull following closely. Through the penultimate turn, Welteji went around Hull, bumping elbows in the process. 1200 in 3:07.10, still six runners in the pack but Kipyegon was driving the train. Down the backstretch two more dropped off, only Welteji, Hull and Georgia Bell were still hanging on. Through the final turn, Kipyegon opened up a gap. On the other end, Muir was sprinting to bridge back to the leaders. Coming off the turn, Hull went into full sprint but Kipyegon just continued to spread the gap, opening it up to 7 metres by the finish. Halfway down the home stretch, Hull got past Welteji, with Bell a step behind. In the last 10 metres, Bell got past Welteji for the bronze. With Muir, this race had the fastest 3rd through 5th places in history.

== Background ==
The women's 1500 metres has been a permanent fixture on the Olympic athletics programme since it was first held in 1972.

Global records before the 2024 Summer Olympics
Record	Athlete (nation)	Time (s)	Location	Date
World record	Faith Kipyegon (KEN)	3:49.04	Paris, France	7 July 2024
Olympic record	Faith Kipyegon (KEN)	3:53.11	Tokyo, Japan	6 August 2021
World leading	Faith Kipyegon (KEN)	3:49.04	Paris, France	7 July 2024

Area records before the 2024 Summer Olympics
Area record	Athlete (nation)	Time (s)
Africa (records)	Faith Kipyegon (KEN)	3:49.04 WR
Asia (records)	Qu Yunxia (CHN)	3:50.46
Europe (records)	Sifan Hassan (NED)	3:51.95
North, Central America and Caribbean (records)	Shelby Houlihan (USA)	3:54.99
Oceania (records)	Jessica Hull (AUS)	3:50.83
South America (records)	Letitia Vriesde (SUR)	4:05.67

== Qualification ==
The women's 1500 metres event qualification period was between 1 July 2023 and 30 June 2024. 45 athletes can qualify for the event, with a maximum of three athletes per nation, by running the entry standard of 4:02.50 seconds or faster or by their World Athletics Ranking for this event.

== Results ==
=== Heats ===
The heats are scheduled for 6 August, starting at 10:05 (UTC+2) in the morning. Qualification: first 6 in each heat (Q) advance to the semi-finals, all others (Re) advance to the repechage round (except DNS, DNF, DQ)

==== Heat 1 ====
Rank	Athlete	Nation	Time	Notes
1	Gudaf Tsegay	Ethiopia	3:58.84	Q
2	Laura Muir	Great Britain	3:58.91	Q
3	Susan Ejore	Kenya	3:59.01	Q
4	Georgia Griffith	Australia	3:59.22 (.217)	Q
5	Agathe Guillemot	France	3:59.22 (.220)	Q
6	Emily Mackay	United States	3:59.63	Q
7	Sophie O'Sullivan	Ireland	4:00.23	PB
8	Sintayehu Vissa	Italy	4:00.69	PB
9	Águeda Marqués	Spain	4:01.60	PB
10	Lucia Stafford	Canada	4:02.22	SB
11	Nozomi Tanaka	Japan	4:04.28	qR
12	Vera Hoffmann	Luxembourg	4:07.64	
13	Adelle Tracey	Jamaica	4:09.33	SB
14	Aleksandra Płocińska	Poland	4:10.12	
15	Joselyn Brea	Venezuela	4:13.77	

==== Heat 2 ====
Rank	Athlete	Nation	Time	Notes
1	Diribe Welteji	Ethiopia	3:59.73	Q
2	Georgia Bell	Great Britain	4:00.29	Q
3	Nikki Hiltz	United States	4:00.42	Q
4	Faith Kipyegon	Kenya	4:00.74	Q
5	Weronika Lizakowska	Poland	4:01.54	Q, PB
6	Maia Ramsden	New Zealand	4:02.83	Q
7	Sarah Healy	Ireland	4:02.91	
8	Linden Hall	Australia	4:03.89	
9	Simone Plourde	Canada	4:06.59	
10	Esther Guerrero	Spain	4:06.60	
11	Nele Weßel	Germany	4:08.55	
12	Sara Lappalainen	Finland	4:08.66	
13	Yume Goto	Japan	4:09.41	PB
14	Federica Del Buono	Italy	4:10.14	
15	María Pía Fernández	Uruguay	4:19.30	

==== Heat 3 ====
Rank	Athlete	Nation	Time	Notes
1	Nelly Chepchirchir	Kenya	4:02.67	Q
2	Jessica Hull	Australia	4:02.70	Q
3	Elle St. Pierre	United States	4:03.22	Q
4	Klaudia Kazimierska	Poland	4:03.49	Q
5	Salomé Afonso	Portugal	4:04.42	Q, PB
6	Marta Pérez	Spain	4:04.94	Q
7	Kristiina Sasínek Mäki	Czech Republic	4:06.07	
8	Revée Walcott-Nolan	Great Britain	4:06.44	
9	Elise Vanderelst	Belgium	4:06.95	
10	Winnie Nanyondo	Uganda	4:07.06	
11	Birke Haylom	Ethiopia	4:07.15	
12	Kate Current	Canada	4:09.81	
13	Ludovica Cavalli	Italy	4:11.68	
14	Farida Abaroge	Refugee Olympic Team	4:29.27	SB

=== Repechage round ===
The repechage round is scheduled for 7 August, starting at 12:45 (UTC+2) in the afternoon. First 3 in each repechage heat (Q) advance to the semi-finals.

==== Heat 1 ====
Rank	Athlete	Nation	Time	Notes
1	Birke Haylom	Ethiopia	4:01.47	Q
2	Ludovica Cavalli	Italy	4:02.46	Q
3	Esther Guerrero	Spain	4:03.15	Q
4	Sophie O'Sullivan	Ireland	4:03.73	
5	Lucia Stafford	Canada	4:04.26	
6	Joselyn Brea	Venezuela	4:05.93	
7	Federica del Buono	Italy	4:06.00	
8	Winnie Nanyondo	Uganda	4:06.35	
9	Nele Weßel	Germany	4:07.22	
10	Kate Current	Canada	4:08.91	
11	Yume Goto	Japan	4:10.40	
12	Farida Abaroge	Refugee Olympic Team	4:30.53	
	Sara Lappalainen	Finland		DNS

==== Heat 2 ====
Rank	Athlete	Nation	Time	Notes
1	Sintayehu Vissa	Italy	4:06.71	Q
2	Revée Walcott-Nolan	Great Britain	4:06.73	Q
3	Águeda Marqués	Spain	4:07.05	Q
4	Sarah Healy	Ireland	4:07.60	
5	Kristiina Sasínek Mäki	Czech Republic	4:07.80	
6	Simone Plourde	Canada	4:08.49	
7	Elise Vanderelst	Belgium	4:08.86	
8	Linden Hall	Australia	4:09.05	
9	Aleksandra Płocińska	Poland	4:09.47	
10	Vera Hoffmann	Luxembourg	4:11.28	
11	Adelle Tracey	Jamaica	4:14.52	
12	María Pía Fernández	Uruguay	4:16.46	

=== Semi-finals ===
The semi-finals took place on 8 August, starting at 19:35 (UTC+2) in the evening.

==== Heat 1 ====
Rank	Athlete	Nation	Time	Notes
1	Faith Kipyegon	Kenya	3:58.64	Q
2	Georgia Bell	Great Britain	3:59.49	Q
3	Elle St. Pierre	United States	3:59.74	Q
4	Laura Muir	Great Britain	3:59.83	Q
5	Klaudia Kazimierska	Poland	4:00.21	Q, PB
6	Águeda Marqués	Spain	4:01.90	Q
7	Esther Guerrero	Spain	4:01.94	
8	Maia Ramsden	New Zealand	4:02.20	NR
9	Georgia Griffith	Australia	4:02.69	
10	Birke Haylom	Ethiopia	4:03.11	
11	Nelly Chepchirchir	Kenya	4:03.24	
12	Ludovica Cavalli	Italy	4:03.59	

==== Heat 2 ====
Rank	Athlete	Nation	Time	Notes
1	Diribe Welteji	Ethiopia	3:55.10	Q
2	Jessica Hull	Australia	3:55.40	Q
3	Nikki Hiltz	United States	3:56.17	Q
4	Gudaf Tsegay	Ethiopia	3:56.41	Q
5	Susan Ejore	Kenya	3:56.57	Q, PB
6	Agathe Guillemot	France	3:56.69	Q, NR
7	Weronika Lizakowska	Poland	3:57.31	NR
8	Marta Pérez	Spain	3:57.75	NR
9	Revée Walcott-Nolan	Great Britain	3:58.08	PB
10	Sintayehu Vissa	Italy	3:58.11	NR
11	Nozomi Tanaka	Japan	3:59.70	SB
12	Salomé Afonso	Portugal	3:59.96	PB
13	Emily Mackay	United States	4:02.03	

=== Final ===
The final took place on 10 August, starting at 20:15 (UTC+2) in the evening.

Rank	Athlete	Nation	Time	Notes
1st place, gold medalist(s)	Faith Kipyegon	Kenya	3:51.29	OR
2nd place, silver medalist(s)	Jessica Hull	Australia	3:52.56	
3rd place, bronze medalist(s)	Georgia Bell	Great Britain	3:52.61	NR
4	Diribe Welteji	Ethiopia	3:52.75	PB
5	Laura Muir	Great Britain	3:53.37	PB
6	Susan Ejore	Kenya	3:56.07	PB
7	Nikki Hiltz	United States	3:56.38	
8	Elle Purrier St. Pierre	United States	3:57.52	
9	Agathe Guillemot	France	3:59.08	
10	Klaudia Kazimierska	Poland	4:00.12	PB
11	Águeda Marqués	Spain	4:00.31	PB
12	Gudaf Tsegay	Ethiopia	4:01.27	
