= 2026 Golden Gala =

Athletics meeting in Rome, Italy

- Dates: 4 June
- Host city: Rome, Italy
- Venue: Stadio Olimpico
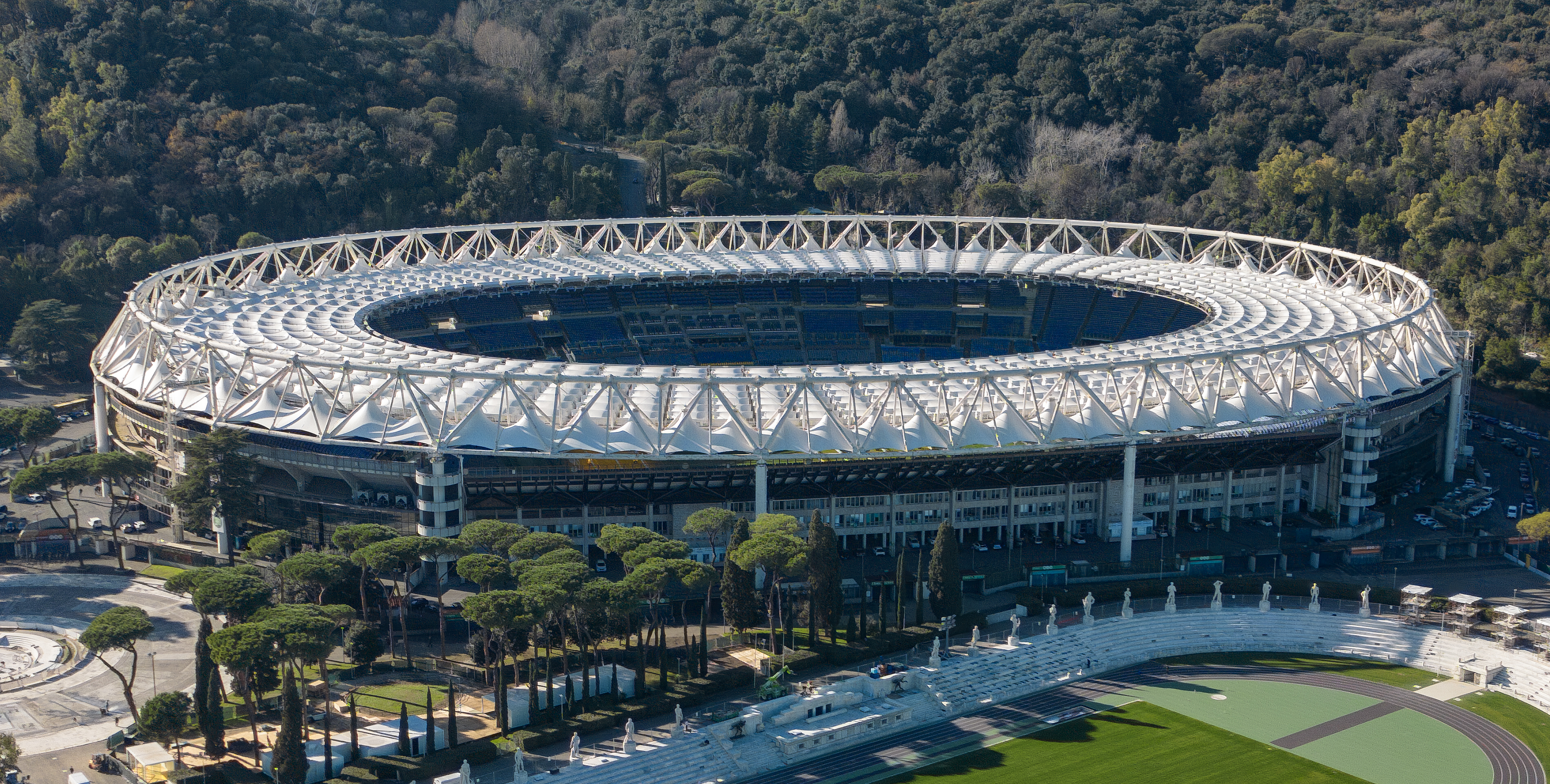
- Level: 2026 Diamond League

The 2026 Golden Gala was the 46th edition of the annual outdoor track and field meeting in Italy. Held on 4 June at the Stadio Olimpico in Rome, it was the fourth leg of the 2026 Diamond League – the highest level international track and field circuit.

== Diamond+ events results ==
=== Men's ===
100 Metres
Place	Athlete	Nation	Time	Points	Notes
1st place, gold medalist(s)	Noah Lyles	United States	9.88	8	SB
2nd place, silver medalist(s)	Emmanuel Eseme	Cameroon	9.94	7	NR
3rd place, bronze medalist(s)	Letsile Tebogo	Botswana	9.95	6	SB
4	Jordan Anthony	United States	9.96	5	
5	Marcell Jacobs	Italy	9.99	4	SB
6	Akani Simbine	South Africa	10.03	3	
7	Ackeem Blake	Jamaica	10.06	2	
8	Ferdinand Omanyala	Kenya	10.11	1	
9	Jeremiah Azu	Great Britain	10.12		SB
			Wind: (+0.4 m/s)		

110 Metres hurdles
Place	Athlete	Nation	Time	Points	Notes
1st place, gold medalist(s)	Trey Cunningham	United States	12.98	8	MR, WL, PB
2nd place, silver medalist(s)	Orlando Bennett	Jamaica	13.31	7	
3rd place, bronze medalist(s)	Enrique Llopis	Spain	13.32	6	SB
4	Rachid Muratake	Japan	13.40	5	
5	Thomas Wilkes	France	13.44	4	SB
6	Jason Joseph	Switzerland	13.49	3	
7	Jakub Szymański	Poland	13.54	2	
8	Just Kwaou-Mathey	France	13.76	1	SB
9	Jamal Britt	United States	26.75		
			Wind: (+0.5 m/s)		

High jump
Place	Athlete	Nation	Height	Points	Notes
1st place, gold medalist(s)	Matteo Sioli	Italy	2.28 m	8	SB
2nd place, silver medalist(s)	Erick Portillo	Mexico	2.23 m	7	
3rd place, bronze medalist(s)	Romaine Beckford	Jamaica	2.23 m	6	
4	Mateusz Kołodziejski	Poland	2.20 m	5	=SB
4	Tomohiro Shinno	Japan	2.20 m	5	=SB
6	Yual Reath	Australia	2.20 m	3	
7	Raymond Richards	Jamaica	2.20 m	2	
8	Jan Štefela	Czech Republic	2.20 m	1	SB
9	JuVaughn Harrison	United States	2.16 m		SB

Long jump
Place	Athlete	Nation	Distance	Points	Notes
1st place, gold medalist(s)	Bozhidar Sarâboyukov	Bulgaria	8.26 m (−0.1 m/s)	8	
2nd place, silver medalist(s)	Miltiadis Tentoglou	Greece	8.24 m (−0.4 m/s)	7	
3rd place, bronze medalist(s)	Jorge A. Hodelín	Cuba	8.18 m (−0.1 m/s)	6	SB
4	Tajay Gayle	Jamaica	8.04 m (−0.3 m/s)	5	
5	Gerson Baldé	Portugal	8.00 m (−0.4 m/s)	4	
6	Thobias Montler	Sweden	7.79 m (−0.5 m/s)	3	
7	Wayne Pinnock	Jamaica	7.75 m (−0.3 m/s)	2	
8	Liam Adcock	Australia	7.70 m (−0.3 m/s)	1	
9	Gabriele Chilà	Italy	7.51 m (−0.1 m/s)		SB

=== Women's ===
200 Metres
Place	Athlete	Nation	Time	Points	Notes
1st place, gold medalist(s)	Julien Alfred	Saint Lucia	21.93	8	
2nd place, silver medalist(s)	Melissa Jefferson-Wooden	United States	22.17	7	
3rd place, bronze medalist(s)	Anavia Battle	United States	22.39	6	
4	Amy Hunt	Great Britain	22.52	5	
5	Dina Asher-Smith	Great Britain	22.76	4	SB
6	Jaël Bestué	Spain	22.98	3	
7	Maboundou Koné	Ivory Coast	23.22	2	SB
8	Elisa Valensin	Italy	23.27	1	
9	Hélène Parisot	France	23.89		
			Wind: (+1.3 m/s)		

400 Metres
Place	Athlete	Nation	Time	Points	Notes
1st place, gold medalist(s)	Henriette Jæger	Norway	49.60	8	SB
2nd place, silver medalist(s)	Lurdes Gloria Manuel	Czech Republic	49.77	7	PB
3rd place, bronze medalist(s)	Nickisha Pryce	Jamaica	49.80	6	
4	Aaliyah Butler	United States	49.83	5	
5	Amber Anning	Great Britain	50.19	4	SB
6	Lieke Klaver	Netherlands	50.62	3	SB
7	Keely Hodgkinson	Great Britain	51.14	2	PB
8	Anna Polinari	Italy	51.58	1	SB

1500 Metres
Place	Athlete	Nation	Time	Points	Notes
1st place, gold medalist(s)	Georgia Hunter Bell	Great Britain	3:58.63	8	SB
2nd place, silver medalist(s)	Klaudia Kazimierska	Poland	3:59.24	7	SB
3rd place, bronze medalist(s)	Nikki Hiltz	United States	3:59.26	6	SB
4	Agathe Guillemot	France	4:00.46	5	
5	Patricia Silva	Portugal	4:00.86	4	
6	Ludovica Cavalli	Italy	4:01.64	3	PB
7	Abbey Caldwell	Australia	4:02.15	2	
8	Salomé Afonso	Portugal	4:03.00	1	
9	Haregeweyni Kalayu	Ethiopia	4:03.43		
10	Águeda Marqués	Spain	4:03.62		SB
11	Jemma Reekie	Great Britain	4:05.39		SB
12	Heather MacLean	United States	4:06.74		SB
13	Gaia Sabbatini	Italy	4:07.04		SB
14	Laura Muir	Great Britain	4:10.54		
—	Weronika Lizakowska	Poland	DNF		PM

Pole vault
Place	Athlete	Nation	Height	Points	Notes
1st place, gold medalist(s)	Molly Caudery	Great Britain	4.80 m	8	SB
2nd place, silver medalist(s)	Nina Kennedy	Australia	4.80 m	7	=SB
3rd place, bronze medalist(s)	Angelica Moser	Switzerland	4.80 m	6	SB
4	Tina Šutej	Slovenia	4.70 m	5	SB
5	Sandi Morris	United States	4.60 m	4	
6	Amálie Švábíková	Czech Republic	4.45 m	3	SB
7	Elisa Molinarolo	Italy	4.45 m	2	SB
8	Eliza McCartney	New Zealand	4.30 m	1	
8	Olivia McTaggart	New Zealand	4.30 m	1	

== Diamond events results ==
=== Men's ===
Triple jump
Place	Athlete	Nation	Distance	Points	Notes
1st place, gold medalist(s)	Andy Díaz	Italy	17.59 m (−0.1 m/s)	8	SB
2nd place, silver medalist(s)	Jordan Scott	Jamaica	17.33 m (−0.2 m/s)	7	
3rd place, bronze medalist(s)	Jaydon Hibbert	Jamaica	17.02 m (−0.8 m/s)	6	SB
4	Lázaro Martínez	Cuba	16.83 m (±0 m/s)	5	SB
5	Yasser Triki	Algeria	16.71 m (−0.3 m/s)	4	SB
6	Russell Robinson	United States	16.40 m (+0.7 m/s)	3	
7	Almir dos Santos	Brazil	16.22 m (+1.1 m/s)	2	
8	Endiorass Kingley	Austria	16.08 m (−0.4 m/s)	1	
—	Thomas Gogois	France	NM		

Shot put
Place	Athlete	Nation	Distance	Points	Notes
1st place, gold medalist(s)	Leonardo Fabbri	Italy	22.14 m	8	
2nd place, silver medalist(s)	Joe Kovacs	United States	21.87 m	7	
3rd place, bronze medalist(s)	Ryan Crouser	United States	21.50 m	6	
4	Tom Walsh	New Zealand	21.49 m	5	SB
5	Rajindra Campbell	Jamaica	21.39 m	4	
6	Jordan Geist	United States	21.30 m	3	
7	Zane Weir	Italy	21.13 m	2	SB
8	Roger Steen	United States	20.85 m	1	
9	Uziel Muñoz	Mexico	20.73 m		SB
10	Adrian Piperi	United States	20.10 m		

Javelin Throw
Place	Athlete	Nation	Distance	Points	Notes
1st place, gold medalist(s)	Rumesh Tharanga	Sri Lanka	92.62 m	8	MR, NR, WL
2nd place, silver medalist(s)	Anderson Peters	Grenada	83.91 m	7	
3rd place, bronze medalist(s)	Curtis Thompson	United States	83.89 m	6	
4	Keshorn Walcott	Trinidad and Tobago	83.45 m	5	SB
5	Thomas Röhler	Germany	82.89 m	4	
6	Dawid Wegner	Poland	80.47 m	3	SB
7	Julius Yego	Kenya	79.89 m	2	
8	Sachin Yadav	India	79.18 m	1	
9	Jakub Vadlejch	Czech Republic	78.28 m		
10	Giovanni Frattini	Italy	74.24 m		

=== Women's ===
5000 Metres
Place	Athlete	Nation	Time	Points	Notes
1st place, gold medalist(s)	Likina Amebaw	Ethiopia	14:18.41	8	WL, PB
2nd place, silver medalist(s)	Aleshign Baweke	Ethiopia	14:18.54	7	PB
3rd place, bronze medalist(s)	Freweyni Hailu	Ethiopia	14:18.94	6	PB
4	Senayet Getachew	Ethiopia	14:22.37	5	PB
5	Medina Eisa	Ethiopia	14:22.51	4	SB
6	Hirut Meshesha	Ethiopia	14:22.56	3	PB
7	Fantaye Belayneh	Ethiopia	14:23.44	2	PB
8	Winfred Yavi	Bahrain	14:30.06	1	NR
9	Maureen Koster	Netherlands	14:33.56		PB
10	Margaret Akidor	Kenya	14:34.01		SB
11	Sarah Madeleine	France	14:37.80		NR
12	Caroline Nyaga	Kenya	14:38.10		
13	Nadia Battocletti	Italy	14:40.05		SB
14	Yenawa Nbret	Ethiopia	14:40.77		SB
15	Linden Hall	Australia	14:40.81		PB
16	Francine Niyomukunzi	Burundi	14:41.46		PB
17	Sarah Healy	Ireland	14:48.88		PB
18	Nozomi Tanaka	Japan	15:12.91		
—	Yenenesh Shimeket	Ethiopia	DNF		
—	Elise Vanderelst	Belgium	DNF		
—	Almaz Baraki	Ethiopia	DNF		PM
—	Purity Chepkirui	Kenya	DNF		PM

100 Metres hurdles
Place	Athlete	Nation	Time	Points	Notes
1st place, gold medalist(s)	Megan Simmonds	Jamaica	12.50	8	SB
2nd place, silver medalist(s)	Kendra Harrison	United States	12.54	7	
3rd place, bronze medalist(s)	Nadine Visser	Netherlands	12.58	6	
4	Marione Fourie	South Africa	12.59	5	SB
5	Danielle Williams	Jamaica	12.69 [.683]	4	SB
6	Pia Skrzyszowska	Poland	12.69 [.686]	3	SB
7	Tonea Marshall	United States	12.76	2	=SB
8	Giada Carmassi	Italy	12.90	1	SB
9	Alessia Succo	Italy	13.19		
			Wind: (+0.8 m/s)		

400 Metres hurdles
Place	Athlete	Nation	Time	Points	Notes
1st place, gold medalist(s)	Emma Zapletalová	Slovakia	52.58	8	NR, WL
2nd place, silver medalist(s)	Anna Cockrell	United States	52.77	7	SB
3rd place, bronze medalist(s)	Rushell Clayton	Jamaica	53.14	6	SB
4	Dalilah Muhammad	United States	53.39	5	SB
5	Gianna Woodruff	Panama	53.58	4	SB
6	Jasmine Jones	United States	53.92	3	SB
7	Amalie Iuel	Norway	54.05	2	PB
8	Alice Muraro	Italy	55.50	1	SB
9	Ayomide Folorunso	Italy	56.01		

== Promotional events results ==
=== Men's ===
800 Metres
Place	Athlete	Nation	Time	Notes
1st place, gold medalist(s)	Gabriel Tual	France	1:43.66	SB
2nd place, silver medalist(s)	Mark English	Ireland	1:43.80	SB
3rd place, bronze medalist(s)	Francesco Pernici	Italy	1:43.97	SB
4	Peyton Craig	Australia	1:44.01	PB
5	Isaac Nader	Portugal	1:44.28	SB
6	Yanis Meziane	France	1:44.29	
7	Bryce Hoppel	United States	1:44.45	SB
8	Donavan Brazier	United States	1:44.46	
9	Nathan Green	United States	1:45.58	PB
—	Patryk Sieradzki	Poland	DNF	PM

== See also ==
- 2026 Diamond League
