= 2026 European Athletics Championships – Women's 1500 metres =

Women's 1500 metres at the 2026 European Athletics Championships
- Venue: Alexander Stadium
- Location: Birmingham, United Kingdom
- Dates: 15 August 2026 (round 1); 16 August 2026 (final)
- Competitors: 30 (target)
- Winning time: 4:07.78

Medalists
gold medal	Georgia Hunter Bell	Great Britain
silver medal	Klaudia Kazimierska	Poland
bronze medal	Patricia Silva	Portugal

The women's 1500 metres at the 2026 European Athletics Championships took place over two rounds at the Alexander Stadium in Birmingham, United Kingdom, on 15 and 16 August 2026.

== Background ==
Records before the 2026 European Athletics Championships
Record	Athlete (nation)	Time	Location	Date
World record	Faith Kipyegon (KEN)	3:48.68	Eugene, United States	5 July 2025
European record	Sifan Hassan (NED)	3:51.95	Doha, Qatar	5 October 2019
Championship record	Tatyana Tomashova (RUS)	3:56.91	Gothenburg, Sweden	13 August 2006
World leading	Birke Haylom (ETH)	3:55.56	Shaoxing, China	16 May 2026
European leading	Georgia Hunter Bell (GBR)	3:56.35	Paris, France	28 June 2026

== Qualification ==
For the women's 1500 metres, the qualification period was from 27 July 2025 to 26 July 2026. Athletes qualified by running the entry standard of 4:03.50 min or faster, by wildcard for the 2024 European Athletics Champion (not used since Ciara Mageean will not participate), or by their position on the World Athletics Rankings for the event. The target number was 30 athletes.

Qualification standings per 31 July 2026
QP	CP	Country	Athlete	Status	Details
1	1	Great Britain & N.I.	Georgia Hunter Bell	Qualified by Entry Standard	3:55.63 - Stade Charléty, Paris (FRA) - 28 JUN 2026
2	1	France	Agathe Guillemot	Qualified by Entry Standard	3:56.24 - Stade Charléty, Paris (FRA) - 28 JUN 2026
3	2	Great Britain & N.I.	Laura Muir	Qualified by Entry Standard	3:57.63 - Boudewijnstadion, Bruxelles (BEL) - 22 AUG 2025
4	1	Ireland	Sarah Healy	Qualified by Entry Standard	3:57.95 - Stadion Śląski, Chorzów (POL) - 16 AUG 2025
5	1	Poland	Klaudia Kazimierska	Qualified by Entry Standard	3:57.95 - National Stadium, Tokyo (JPN) - 16 SEP 2025
6	1	Portugal	Patricia Silva	Qualified by Entry Standard	3:58.74 - Stade Charléty, Paris (FRA) - 28 JUN 2026
7	1	Italy	Gaia Sabbatini	Qualified by Entry Standard	3:59.49 - Nemzeti Atlétikai Központ, Budapest (HUN) - 12 AUG 2025
8	1	Lithuania	Gabija Galvydytė	Qualified by Entry Standard	3:59.74 - China Textile City Sports Centre, Shaoxing/Keqiao (CHN) - 16 MAY 2026
9	3	Great Britain & N.I.	Revée Walcott-Nolan	Qualified by Entry Standard	3:59.89 - Nemzeti Atlétikai Központ, Budapest (HUN) - 12 AUG 2025
10	2	Italy	Marta Zenoni	Qualified by Entry Standard	4:00.00 - Boudewijnstadion, Bruxelles (BEL) - 22 AUG 2025
11	2	Portugal	Salomé Afonso	Qualified by Entry Standard	4:00.47 - National Stadium, Tokyo (JPN) - 16 SEP 2025
reserve	4	Great Britain & N.I.	Katie Snowden	Qualified by Entry Standard	4:00.91 - Stade Charléty, Paris (FRA) - 28 JUN 2026
12	2	France	Adèle Gay	Qualified by Entry Standard	4:01.21 - Stade Raymond Petit, Tomblaine (FRA) - 03 JUL 2026
13	1	Switzerland	Joceline Wind	Qualified by Entry Standard	4:01.41 - Egret Stadium, Xiamen (CHN) - 23 MAY 2026
14	1	Sweden	Wilma Nielsen	Qualified by Entry Standard	4:01.60 - Boston Univ. Track & Tennis Center, Boston, MA (USA) (i) - 14 FEB 2026
15	3	Italy	Ludovica Cavalli	Qualified by Entry Standard	4:01.64 - Stadio Olimpico, Roma (ITA) - 04 JUN 2026
16	2	Ireland	Sophie O'Sullivan	Qualified by Entry Standard	4:02.12 - National Stadium, Tokyo (JPN) - 13 SEP 2025
17	2	Poland	Weronika Lizakowska	Qualified by Entry Standard	4:03.39 - National Stadium, Tokyo (JPN) - 14 SEP 2025
18	1	Czech Republic	Kristiina Sasínek Mäki	Qualified by World Rankings	26th - 1198 points
19	1	Turkey	Şilan Ayyıldız	Qualified by World Rankings	27th - 1194 points
20	2	Sweden	Mia Barnett	Qualified by World Rankings	28th - 1192 points
21	2	Switzerland	Delia Sclabas	Qualified by World Rankings	29th - 1183 points
22	1	Norway	Anne Gine Løvnes	Qualified by World Rankings	30th - 1183 points
23	3	France	Augustine Haquet	Qualified by World Rankings	31st - 1179 points
24	3	Sweden	Vera Sjöberg	Qualified by World Rankings	33rd - 1176 points
reserve	4	Sweden	Carmen Cernjul	Qualified by World Rankings	36th - 1173 points
reserve	5	Sweden	Yolanda Ngarambe	Qualified by World Rankings	39th - 1171 points
25	3	Ireland	Jodie McCann	Qualified by World Rankings	40th - 1167 points
26	1	Luxembourg	Vera Bertemes-Hoffmann	Qualified by World Rankings	42nd - 1164 points
reserve	4	Ireland	Eimear Maher	Qualified by World Rankings	46th - 1161 points
27	1	Denmark	Annemarie Nissen	Qualified by World Rankings	52nd - 1155 points
28	2	Norway	Marte Hovland	Qualified by World Rankings	53rd - 1153 points
29	3	Norway	Ingeborg Østgård	Qualified by World Rankings	54th - 1148 points
30	3	Switzerland	Lilly Nägeli	Qualified by World Rankings	59th - 1139 points
reserve	1	Greece	Koraini Kyriakopoulou	Next best by World Rankings	60th - 1138 points
reserve	4	Norway	Selma Engdahl	Next best by World Rankings	61st - 1136 points
reserve	1	Croatia	Klara Andrijašević	Next best by World Rankings	86th - 1107 points
reserve	4	Italy	Sintayehu Vissa	Next best by World Rankings	93rd - 1102 points

Bye to semi-finals	Reserve activated	Withdrawal / reserve unused

== Schedule ==
Date	Time	Round
15 August 2026	12:15	Round 1
16 August 2026	21:13	Final

All times are local times (UTC+1)

== Results ==
=== Round 1 ===
Round 1 was held on 15 August 2026, at 12:15 in the afternoon. First 6 in each heat (Q) advanced to the final.

==== Heat 1 ====
Place	Athlete	Nation	Time	Notes
1	Georgia Hunter Bell	Great Britain & N.I.	4:08.97	Q
2	Klaudia Kazimierska	Poland	4:09.61	Q
3	Salomé Afonso	Portugal	4:10.07	Q
4	Ludovica Cavalli	Italy	4:10.32	Q
5	Adèle Gay	France	4:10.56	Q
6	Kristiina Sasínek Mäki	Czech Republic	4:10.84	Q
7	Gabija Galvydytė	Lithuania	4:10.87	
8	Joceline Wind	Switzerland	4:10.95	
9	Şilan Ayyıldız	Turkey	4:11.33	
10	Anne Gine Løvnes	Norway	4:11.38	
11	Mia Barnett	Sweden	4:14.01	
12	Marte Hovland	Norway	4:14.32	
13	Jodie McCann	Ireland	4:14.63 [.624]	
14	Vera Bertemes-Hoffmann	Luxembourg	4:14.63 [.628]	
15	Lilly Nägeli	Switzerland	4:19.28	

==== Heat 2 ====
Place	Athlete	Nation	Time	Notes
1	Patricia Silva	Portugal	4:08.10	Q
2	Sarah Healy	Ireland	4:08.12	Q
3	Agathe Guillemot	France	4:08.17	Q
4	Weronika Lizakowska	Poland	4:08.43	Q
5	Sophie O'Sullivan	Ireland	4:08.88	Q
6	Augustine Haquet	France	4:08.98	Q
7	Delia Sclabas	Switzerland	4:09.09	
8	Laura Muir	Great Britain & N.I.	4:09.66	
9	Wilma Nielsen	Sweden	4:10.50	
10	Annemarie Nissen	Denmark	4:10.77	
11	Katie Snowden	Great Britain & N.I.	4:11.49	
12	Gaia Sabbatini	Italy	4:11.71	
13	Carmen Cernjul	Sweden	4:13.00	
14	Ingeborg Østgård	Norway	4:18.81	

=== Final ===
The final was held on 16 August 2026, at 21:13 in the evening.

Place	Athlete	Nation	Time	Notes
1st place, gold medalist(s)	Georgia Hunter Bell	Great Britain & N.I.	4:07.78	
2nd place, silver medalist(s)	Klaudia Kazimierska	Poland	4:08.80	
3rd place, bronze medalist(s)	Patricia Silva	Portugal	4:09.22	
4	Agathe Guillemot	France	4:09.62	
5	Sarah Healy	Ireland	4:10.76	
6	Adèle Gay	France	4:11.01	
7	Kristiina Sasínek Mäki	Czech Republic	4:11.06	
8	Sophie O'Sullivan	Ireland	4:11.72	
9	Weronika Lizakowska	Poland	4:11.81	
10	Augustine Haquet	France	4:12.31	
11	Salomé Afonso	Portugal	4:14.35	
12	Ludovica Cavalli	Italy	4:18.91	
