= 2022 Bislett Games =

- Dates: 16 June 2022
- Host city: Oslo, Norway
- Venue: Bislett Stadium
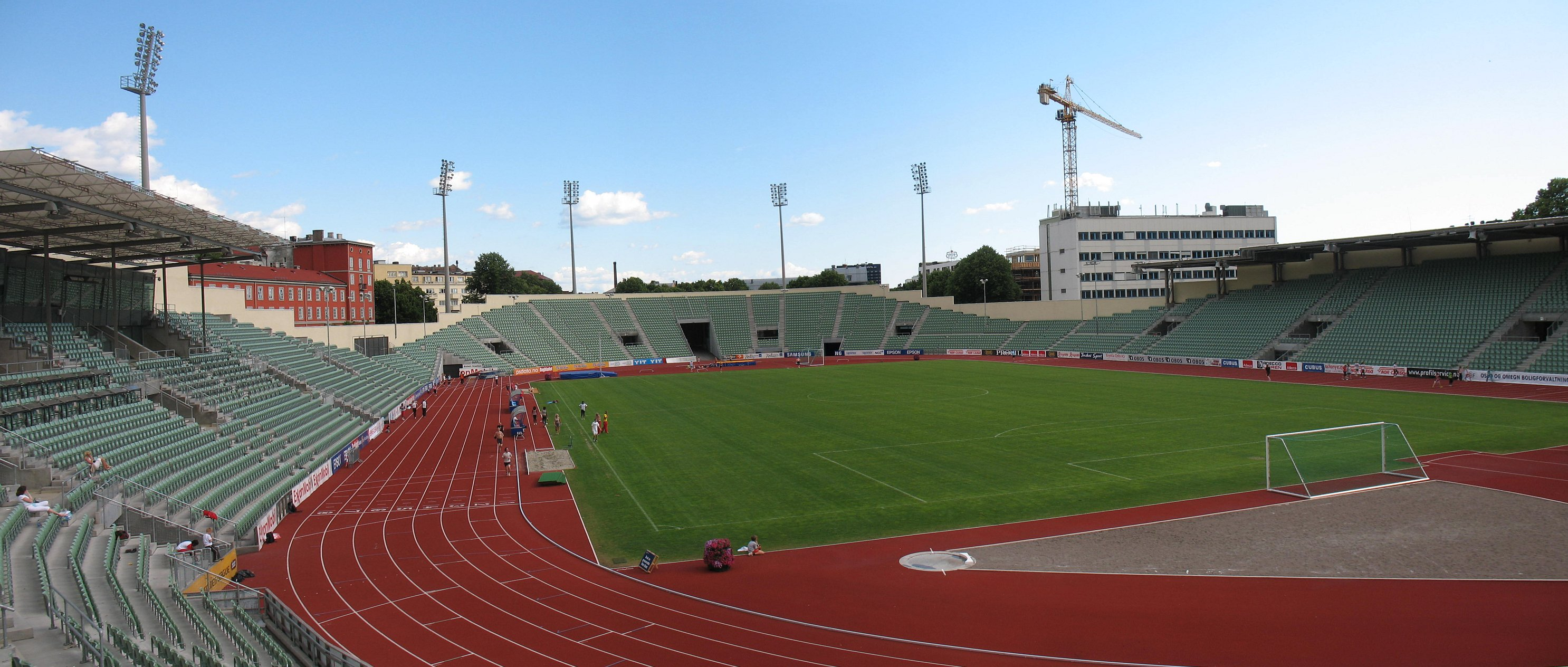
- Level: 2022 Diamond League

The 2022 Bislett Games was the 57th edition of the annual outdoor track and field meeting in Oslo, Norway. Held on 16 June at Bislett Stadium, it was the sixth leg of the 2022 Diamond League – the highest level international track and field circuit.

The meeting was highlighted by the Dream Mile, where Jakob Ingebrigtsen ran the world's fastest mile in 21 years. Although the time of 3:46.46 was a national record, it was one tenth of a second short of breaking the European record of 3:46.32.

== Results ==
Athletes competing in the Diamond League disciplines earned extra compensation and points which went towards qualifying for the Diamond League finals in Zürich. First place earned eight points, with each step down in place earning one less point than the previous, until no points are awarded in ninth place or lower.

=== Diamond Discipline ===
Men's 100m (+0.5 m/s)
Place	Athlete	Country	Time	Points
1st place, gold medalist(s)	Andre De Grasse	Canada	10.05	8
2nd place, silver medalist(s)	Reece Prescod	Great Britain	10.06	7
3rd place, bronze medalist(s)	Akani Simbine	South Africa	10.09	6
4	Benjamin Azamati	Ghana	10.15	5
5	Yupun Abeykoon	Sri Lanka	10.16	4
6	Abdul Hakim Sani Brown	Japan	10.18	3
7	Rohan Browning	Australia	10.28	2
8	Ojie Edoburun	Great Britain	10.30	1

Men's 400m
Place	Athlete	Country	Time	Points
1st place, gold medalist(s)	Kirani James	Grenada	44.78	8
2nd place, silver medalist(s)	Isaac Makwala	Botswana	45.45	7
3rd place, bronze medalist(s)	Christopher Taylor	Jamaica	45.52	6
4	Zakithi Nene	South Africa	45.73	5
5	Liemarvin Bonevacia	Netherlands	45.77	4
6	Benjamin Lobo Vedel	Denmark	45.79	3
7	Luguelín Santos	Dominican Republic	45.92	2
8	Håvard Bentdal Ingvaldsen	Norway	46.60	1

Men's Mile
Place	Athlete	Country	Time	Points
1st place, gold medalist(s)	Jakob Ingebrigtsen	Norway	3:46.46	8
2nd place, silver medalist(s)	Ollie Hoare	Australia	3:47.48	7
3rd place, bronze medalist(s)	Jake Wightman	Great Britain	3:50.30	6
4	Neil Gourley	Great Britain	3:52.91	5
5	Charles Grethen	Luxembourg	3:53.20	4
6	Ignacio Fontes	Spain	3:54.72	3
7	Michał Rozmys	Poland	3:55.13	2
8	Samuel Abate	Ethiopia	3:55.23	1
9	Ferdinand Kvan Edman	Norway	3:55.75	
10	Matthew Ramsden	Australia	3:57.11	
	Ismael Debjani	Belgium	DNF	
	Mohamed Katir	Spain	DNF	
	Boaz Kiprugut	Kenya	DNF	
	Mounir Akbache	France	DNF	

Men's 5000m
Place	Athlete	Country	Time	Points
1st place, gold medalist(s)	Telahun Haile Bekele	Ethiopia	13:03.51	8
2nd place, silver medalist(s)	Samuel Tefera	Ethiopia	13:04.35	7
3rd place, bronze medalist(s)	Getnet Wale	Ethiopia	13:04.48	6
4	Joe Klecker	United States	13:04.92	5
5	Milkesa Mengesha	Ethiopia	13:05.94	4
6	Jack Rayner	Australia	13:06.00	3
7	Adel Mechaal	Spain	13:06.02	2
8	Peter Maru	Uganda	13:07.42	1
9	Narve Gilje Nordås	Norway	13:15.82	
10	Ali Abdilmana	Ethiopia	13:16.97	
11	Luis Grijalva	Guatemala	13:18.13	
12	Magnus Tuv Myhre	Norway	13:33.43	
13	Elzan Bibić	Serbia	13:36.91	
14	Henrik Ingebrigtsen	Norway	13:48.89	
	Sam Atkin	Great Britain	DNF	
	Filip Ingebrigtsen	Norway	DNF	
	Wilberforce Chemiat Kones	Kenya	DNF	

Men's 110mH (−1.2 m/s)
Place	Athlete	Country	Time	Points
1st place, gold medalist(s)	Devon Allen	United States	13.22	8
2nd place, silver medalist(s)	Asier Martínez	Spain	13.30	7
3rd place, bronze medalist(s)	Rafael Pereira	Brazil	13.37	6
4	Aaron Mallett	United States	13.40	5
5	Jason Joseph	Switzerland	13.55	4
6	Paolo Dal Molin	Italy	13.76	3
	Wilhem Belocian	France	DNF	

Men's 400mH
Place	Athlete	Country	Time	Points
1st place, gold medalist(s)	Alison dos Santos	Brazil	47.26	8
2nd place, silver medalist(s)	Rasmus Mägi	Estonia	48.51	7
3rd place, bronze medalist(s)	Wilfried Happio	France	49.01	6
4	Carl Bengtström	Sweden	49.31	5
5	Yasmani Copello	Turkey	49.36	4
6	Nick Smidt	Netherlands	49.77	3
7	Sokwakhana Zazini	South Africa	50.17	2
8	Ramsey Angela	Netherlands	50.21	1

Men's Pole Vault
Place	Athlete	Country	Mark	Points
1st place, gold medalist(s)	Armand Duplantis	Sweden	6.02 m	8
2nd place, silver medalist(s)	Sondre Guttormsen	Norway	5.80 m	7
3rd place, bronze medalist(s)	Pål Haugen Lillefosse	Norway	5.80 m	6
4	Ben Broeders	Belgium	5.60 m	5
5	Renaud Lavillenie	France	5.60 m	4
6	Thiago Braz	Brazil	5.60 m	3
7	Simen Guttormsen	Norway	5.40 m	2
	Valentin Lavillenie	France	NM	

Men's Long Jump
Place	Athlete	Country	Mark	Points
1st place, gold medalist(s)	Miltiadis Tentoglou	Greece	8.10 m (+1.0 m/s)	8
2nd place, silver medalist(s)	Thobias Montler	Sweden	8.05 m (+0.9 m/s)	7
3rd place, bronze medalist(s)	Simon Ehammer	Switzerland	7.95 m (+0.7 m/s)	6
4	Emiliano Lasa	Uruguay	7.90 m (+1.4 m/s)	5
5	Ruswahl Samaai	South Africa	7.68 m (−0.1 m/s)	4
6	Kristian Pulli	Finland	7.62 m (+0.7 m/s)	3
7	Ingar Kiplesund	Norway	7.58 m (+0.3 m/s)	2
8	Henrik Flåtnes	Norway	7.54 m (+0.8 m/s)	1
9	Benjamin Gföhler	Switzerland	7.43 m (+1.0 m/s)	
10	LaQuan Nairn	Bahamas	7.42 m (−0.6 m/s)	

Women's 200m (+0.8 m/s)
Place	Athlete	Country	Time	Points
1st place, gold medalist(s)	Ida Karstoft	Denmark	22.73	8
2nd place, silver medalist(s)	Beth Dobbin	Great Britain	23.01	7
3rd place, bronze medalist(s)	Jamile Samuel	Netherlands	23.05	6
4	Nikola Horowska	Poland	23.22	5
5	Dalia Kaddari	Italy	23.30	4
6	Elisabeth Slettum	Norway	23.32	3
7	Gémima Joseph	France	23.88	2
8	Martyna Kotwiła	Poland	23.94	1

Women's 800m
Place	Athlete	Country	Time	Points
1st place, gold medalist(s)	Keely Hodgkinson	Great Britain	1:57.71	8
2nd place, silver medalist(s)	Laura Muir	Great Britain	1:58.09	7
3rd place, bronze medalist(s)	Rénelle Lamote	France	1:58.50	6
4	Halimah Nakaayi	Uganda	1:58.68	5
5	Diribe Welteji	Ethiopia	1:58.69	4
6	Natoya Goule	Jamaica	1:59.31	3
7	Catriona Bisset	Australia	1:59.42	2
8	Jemma Reekie	Great Britain	1:59.83	1
9	Olha Lyakhova	Ukraine	2:00.39	
10	Hedda Hynne	Norway	2:00.90	
11	Lovisa Lindh	Sweden	2:04.74	
	Aneta Lemiesz	Poland	DNF	

Women's 5000m
Place	Athlete	Country	Time	Points
1st place, gold medalist(s)	Dawit Seyaum	Ethiopia	14:25.84	8
2nd place, silver medalist(s)	Gudaf Tsegay	Ethiopia	14:26.69	7
3rd place, bronze medalist(s)	Letesenbet Gidey	Ethiopia	14:26.92	6
4	Karoline Bjerkeli Grøvdal	Norway	14:31.07	5
5	Alicia Monson	United States	14:31.11	4
6	Almaz Ayana	Ethiopia	14:32.17	3
7	Hawi Feysa	Ethiopia	14:33.66	2
8	Konstanze Klosterhalfen	Germany	14:37.94	1
9	Yasemin Can	Turkey	14:41.40	
10	Tsigie Gebreselama	Ethiopia	14:43.90	
11	Abersh Minsewo	Ethiopia	14:47.98	
12	Laura Galván	Mexico	14:51.15	
13	Jessica Warner-Judd	Great Britain	15:00.17	
14	Maureen Koster	Netherlands	15:00.64	
15	Alina Reh	Germany	15:06.29	
16	Rose Davies	Australia	15:20.37	
	Rosefline Chepngetich	Kenya	DNF	
	Eilish McColgan	Great Britain	DNF	

Women's 400mH
Place	Athlete	Country	Time	Points
1st place, gold medalist(s)	Femke Bol	Netherlands	52.61	8
2nd place, silver medalist(s)	Anna Ryzhykova	Ukraine	54.81	7
3rd place, bronze medalist(s)	Jessie Knight	Great Britain	54.84	6
4	Amalie Iuel	Norway	54.91	5
5	Lina Nielsen	Great Britain	55.06	4
6	Viktoriya Tkachuk	Ukraine	55.18	3
7	Line Kloster	Norway	56.07	2
8	Carolina Krafzik	Germany	58.74	1

Women's Shot Put
Place	Athlete	Country	Mark	Points
1st place, gold medalist(s)	Chase Ealey	United States	20.13 m	8
2nd place, silver medalist(s)	Jessica Schilder	Netherlands	19.46 m	7
3rd place, bronze medalist(s)	Auriol Dongmo	Portugal	19.43 m	6
4	Danniel Thomas-Dodd	Jamaica	19.04 m	5
5	Fanny Roos	Sweden	18.99 m	4
6	Sarah Mitton	Canada	18.98 m	3
7	Maggie Ewen	United States	18.22 m	2
8	Axelina Johansson	Sweden	18.02 m	1
9	Sophie McKinna	Great Britain	16.64 m	

Women's Discus Throw
Place	Athlete	Country	Mark	Points
1st place, gold medalist(s)	Sandra Perković	Croatia	66.82 m	8
2nd place, silver medalist(s)	Valarie Allman	United States	65.91 m	7
3rd place, bronze medalist(s)	Kristin Pudenz	Germany	63.31 m	6
4	Claudine Vita	Germany	61.57 m	5
5	Liliana Cá	Portugal	61.49 m	4
6	Lisa Brix Pedersen	Denmark	59.03 m	3
7	Mélina Robert-Michon	France	58.70 m	2
8	Marike Steinacker	Germany	58.35 m	1

=== Promotional Events ===
Men's Hammer Throw
Place	Athlete	Country	Mark
1st place, gold medalist(s)	Paweł Fajdek	Poland	80.56 m
2nd place, silver medalist(s)	Bence Halász	Hungary	79.29 m
3rd place, bronze medalist(s)	Wojciech Nowicki	Poland	78.36 m
4	Eivind Henriksen	Norway	78.23 m
5	Mykhaylo Kokhan	Ukraine	77.36 m
6	Thomas Mardal	Norway	74.81 m

Women's 4 × 400 m
Place	Athlete	Country	Time
1st place, gold medalist(s)	Ama Pipi; Lina Nielsen; Jessica Turner; Jessie Knight	Great Britain	3:28.57
2nd place, silver medalist(s)	Line Kloster; Elisabeth Slettum; Lakeri Ertzgaard; Amalie Iuel	Norway	3:28.58
3rd place, bronze medalist(s)	Sophie Becker; Phil Healy; Róisín Harrison; Sharlene Mawdsley	Ireland	3:29.46
4	Marie Kimumba; Moa Hjelmer; Matilda Hellqvist; Klara Helander	Sweden	3:40.13

=== National Events ===
Men's 100m
Place	Athlete	Country	Time	Heat
1st place, gold medalist(s)	Elvis Afrifa	Netherlands	10.35	1
2nd place, silver medalist(s)	Jacob Vaula	Norway	10.46	1
3rd place, bronze medalist(s)	Edem Agbo	Norway	10.65	1
4	Jørgen Evensen Lund	Norway	10.67	2
5	Sondre Faugstad Amundsen	Norway	10.69	1
6	Sondre Lindaas Gjesdal	Norway	10.78	1
7	Valentin Jensen	Denmark	10.84	2
8	Einar Rye	Norway	10.91	2
9	Sondre Matias Rudi	Norway	10.94	2
10	Johannes Steinsland Gulbrandse Lunde	Norway	10.98	2
11	Sander Werge Nilsen	Norway	11.08	2
12	Vegard Dragsund Sverd	Norway	11.08	2
13	Christian Mensah	Norway	11.11	2
14	Sander Steen Myrvang	Norway	11.12	1

Men's 200m (+0.1 m/s)
Place	Athlete	Country	Time
1st place, gold medalist(s)	Taymir Burnet	Netherlands	20.92
2nd place, silver medalist(s)	Mathias Hove Johansen	Norway	21.00
3rd place, bronze medalist(s)	Skander Djamil Athmani	Algeria	21.19
4	Kenny Emi Tijani-Ajayi	Norway	21.39
5	Andreas Ofstad Kulseng	Norway	21.43
6	Jonas Berggård Skåden	Norway	21.70
7	Herman Ellingsen	Norway	21.75
8	Daniel Alejandro Johnsen	Norway	22.06

Men's 1500m
Place	Athlete	Country	Time
1st place, gold medalist(s)	Sigurd Tveit	Norway	3:41.16
2nd place, silver medalist(s)	Job Ijtsma	Netherlands	3:41.52
3rd place, bronze medalist(s)	Even Brøndbo Dahl	Norway	3:41.68
4	Esten Hansen-Møllerud Hauen	Norway	3:42.05
5	Gregory Bernage	France	3:42.13
6	Eivind Tym Wikshåland	Norway	3:43.95
7	Andreas Fjeld Halvorsen	Norway	3:45.20
8	Bjørnar Sandnes Lillefosse	Norway	3:45.38
9	Anders Bjørndal	Norway	3:46.45
10	Jurjen Polderman	Netherlands	3:46.64
11	Elmer Mulleri Skalle	Norway	3:47.80
12	Moa Abounnachat Bollerød	Norway	3:48.02
13	Benjamin Olsen	Norway	3:48.10
14	Sondre RishøI	Norway	3:50.95
15	Halvor Nymoen	Norway	3:51.66
	Thomas Roth	Norway	DNF

Men's 4 × 100 m
Place	Athlete	Country	Time
1st place, gold medalist(s)	Elvis Afrifa; Taymir Burnet; Solomon Bockarie; Raphael Bouju	Netherlands	40.86
2nd place, silver medalist(s)	B Strømsvold; A Botez; Sander Steen Myrvang; H Skaftun	Norway	45.02
	Sondre Faugstad Amundsen; Mathias Hove Johansen; Jacob Vaula; Edem Agbo	Norway	DQ

Women's 100m (±0.0 m/s)
Place	Athlete	Country	Time
1st place, gold medalist(s)	Naomi Sedney	Netherlands	11.60
2nd place, silver medalist(s)	Christine Bjelland Jensen	Norway	11.72
3rd place, bronze medalist(s)	Vilde Aasmo	Norway	11.74
4	Maren Bakke Amundsen	Norway	11.87
5	Hanne Berit Irgens	Norway	12.09
6	Laura Tietje Johanna van der Veen	Norway	12.12
7	Nora Aune	Norway	12.20

Women's 200m (−0.1 m/s)
Place	Athlete	Country	Time
1st place, gold medalist(s)	Leonie van Vliet	Netherlands	23.48
2nd place, silver medalist(s)	Tasa Jiya	Netherlands	23.65
3rd place, bronze medalist(s)	Moa Hjelmer	Sweden	23.72
4	Linn Oppegaard	Norway	23.87
5	Marte Pettersen	Norway	24.05
6	Kaitesi Ertzgaard	Norway	24.40
7	Matilda Hellqvist	Sweden	24.49
8	Klara Helander	Sweden	25.10

Women's 1500m
Place	Athlete	Country	Time
1st place, gold medalist(s)	Ingeborg Østgård	Norway	4:09.91
2nd place, silver medalist(s)	Marissa Damink	Netherlands	4:10.25
3rd place, bronze medalist(s)	Amalie Sæten	Norway	4:10.58
4	Jetske van Kampen	Netherlands	4:10.95
5	Malin Edland	Norway	4:19.89
6	Selma Engdahl	Norway	4:19.96
7	Malin Hoelsveen	Norway	4:20.21
8	Kristine Lande Dommersnes	Norway	4:20.24
9	Sara Busic	Norway	4:20.94
10	Anne Gine Løvnes	Norway	4:21.14
11	Christina Maria Toogood	Norway	4:21.49
12	Saga Provci	Sweden	4:22.97
13	Vilde Våge Henriksen	Norway	4:23.67
14	Ingrid Kristiansen	Norway	4:26.39
	Amanda Marie Frøynes	Norway	DNF
	Trine Mjåland	Norway	DNF

Women's 400mH
Place	Athlete	Country	Time
1st place, gold medalist(s)	Marlén Aakre	Norway	57.49
2nd place, silver medalist(s)	Nessa Cooper Millet	Ireland	58.25
3rd place, bronze medalist(s)	Cathelijn Peeters	Netherlands	58.49
4	Marin Stray Gautadottir	Norway	1:00.82

Women's 4 × 100 m
Place	Athlete	Country	Time
1st place, gold medalist(s)	Jamile Samuel; Tasa Jiya; Leonie van Vliet; Naomi Sedney	Netherlands	43.69
2nd place, silver medalist(s)	Vilde Aasmo; Christine Bjelland Jensen; Marte Pettersen; Maren Bakke Amundsen	Norway	44.29
3rd place, bronze medalist(s)	Miranda Lauvstad; Alice Ulla Berg; Camilla Dahl Kristiansen; Kaja Carlsen-Brown	Norway	47.20

== See also ==
- 2022 Weltklasse Zürich (Diamond League final)
