= Mia Barnett =

Swedish athlete (born 2003)

Personal information
- Nationality: Swedish
- Born: 4 September 2003 (age 22) United States

Sport
- Sport: Athletics
- Event: Middle distance running
- College team: Oregon Ducks

Achievements and titles
- Personal bests: 800m: 2:03.25 (2026); 1500m: 4:05.39 (2025); Mile: 4:26.40 (2025)

Mia Barnett (born 4 September 2003) is a Swedish-American middle-distance runner. She began to represent Sweden in 2025, having previously competed for the United States as a junior athlete.

== Early and personal life ==
A dual-citizen with the United States and Sweden, she was born in the United States to a Swedish mother who had moved to the States with her family when she was three years-old, and a father of Swedish-Finnish descent. Barnett grew up in Los Angeles. She attended Crescenta Valley High School, and in 202- ran the third fastest time for the mile run in California high school history, running 4:39.41 in Irvine.

== Career ==
She represented the United States at the 2022 World Athletics U20 Championships in Cali, Colombia, where she reached the final with time of 4:18.51 for the 1500 metres, before placing eleventh overall in the final.

Barnett first competed for the Virginia Cavaliers and UCLA Bruins track and field teams in the NCAA, becoming an All-American at both schools.

She then transferred again to the University of Oregon, where she studied and competed for the Oregon Ducks track and field team. She ran a personal best for the mile run of 4:26.40 at the Drake Relays in April 2025. She qualified for the final of the 1500 metres at the 2025 NCAA Outdoor Championships in Eugene, Oregon in June 2025, finishing second in her 1500 metres semi-final ahead of teammate Klaudia Kazimierska and behind eventual winner Sophie O'Sullivan, before going on to place twelfth in the final.

She began to compete for Sweden in 2025, making her debut in a Swedish vest at the 2025 European Athletics U23 Championships, where she qualified for the final and placed sixth overall in the 1500 metres. After moving to Sweden in 2025 she joined Hälle IF. In September 2025, she competed over 1500 metres at the 2025 World Championships in Tokyo, Japan, without advancing to the semi-finals.

Barnett placed seventh in the individual race and won team title with the Oregon Ducks at the Big Ten cross country championships on 31 October 2025. She had a twelfth place finish at the NCAA West Regional cross country championships on 14 November 2025 at in Sacramento, California, helping the Oregon Ducks to a second-place finish.

In May 2026, she ran a personal best for the 800 metres with 2:03.25 in Karlsruhe, Germany. In August, she competed at the 2026 European Athletics Championships in Birmingham, England, in the 1500 metres.
