= Patrícia Silva (runner) =

Portuguese middle-distance runner (born 1999)

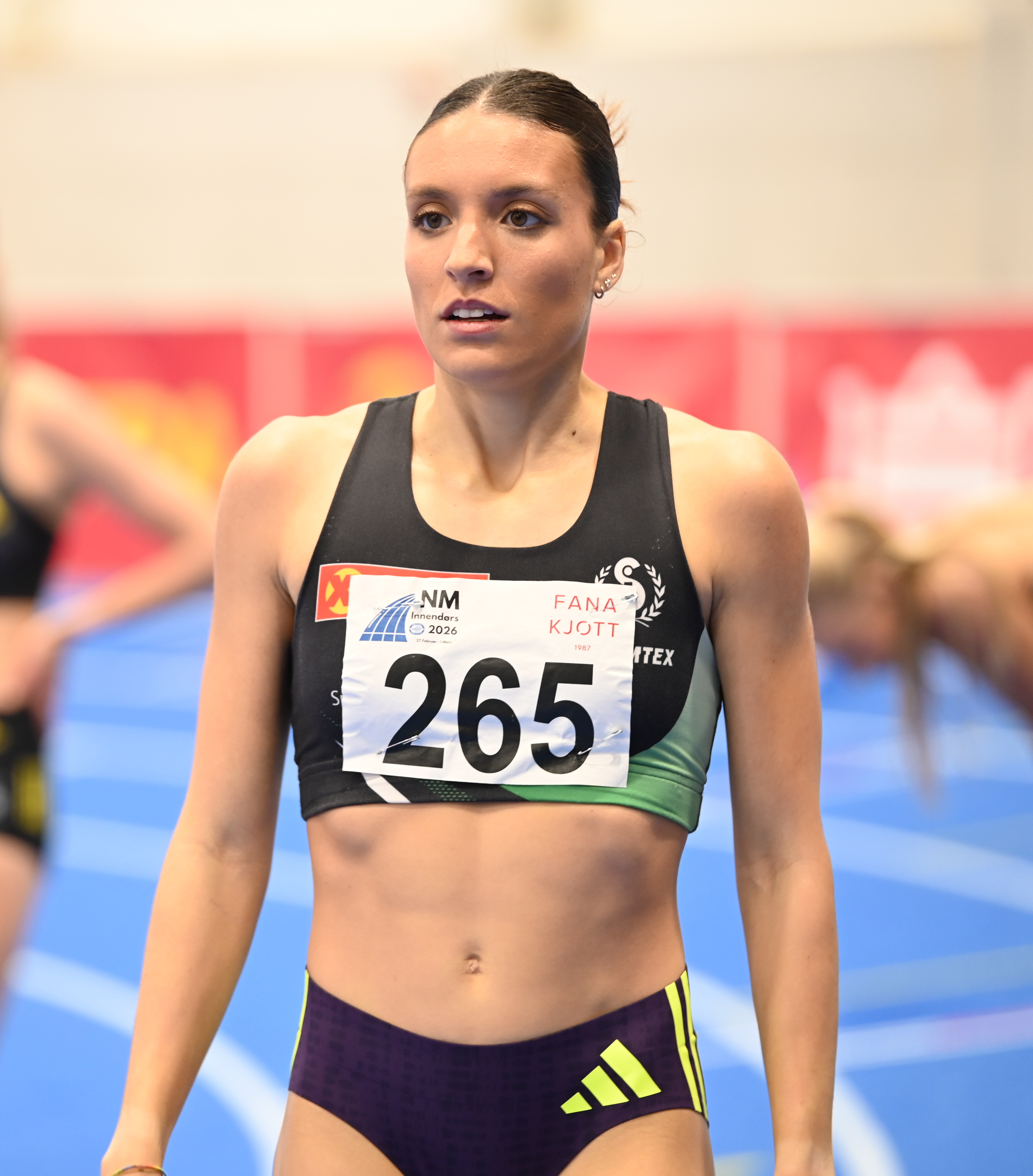
- Patrícia Silva in 2026

Personal information
- Nationality: Portuguese
- Born: 9 December 1999 (age 26)

Sport
- Sport: Athletics
- Events: Middle-distance running, Cross country running
- Club: Sporting CP

Achievements and titles
- Personal bests: 800 m: 2:00.07 (Huelva, 2023; 1500 m: 3:58.74 (Paris, 2026)
Medal record
Women's athletics
Representing Portugal
World Indoor Championships
Bronze medal – third place	2025 Nanjing	800 metres
European Championships
Bronze medal – third place	2026 Birmingham	1500 m
European Cross Country Championships
Silver medal – second place	2025 Lagoa	Mixed relay
Mediterranean Games
Gold medal – first place	2026 Taranto	1500 m

Patrícia Silva (born 9 December 1999) is a Portuguese middle-distance runner. She won the bronze medal over 800 metres at the 2025 World Athletics Indoor Championships, and a silver medal in the mixed team relay at the 2025 European Cross Country Championships.

== Biography ==
She started athletics at the Clube Ateneu Artístico Cartachense. However, after that club closed down her father, Rui Silva, created the Escola de Atletismo Rui Silva, in Cartaxo. She then became a member of Sport Lisboa e Benfica and Grupo Desportivo do Estreito, before joining Sporting CP in Lisbon. She made her first international appearance in 2016 at the European Youth Olympic Festival (FOGE).

She competed for Portugal at the 2019 European Cross Country Championships. That year, she finished sixth at the 2019 European Athletics U23 Championships in the women's 1500 metres. In 2022, she won the bronze medal in the 800 metres at the Ibero-American Championships. In 2023, she became Portuguese champion over 800 metres. She competed at the 2023 World Athletics Championships in Budapest, in the women's 800 metres.

She competed at the 2024 European Athletics Championships in Rome in the women's 800 metres. In January 2025, she set a new personal best winning in Dortmund over 1500 metres indoors. She competed at the 2025 European Athletics Indoor Championships in Apeldoorn in the women's 1500 metres, where she qualified for the final. She qualified for the final of the 800 metres at the 2025 World Athletics Indoor Championships in Nanjing. In the final, she ran 1:59.80 and set a personal best as well as a Portuguese national indoor record, and won the bronze medal, 24 years after her father won the bronze medal in the 2001 edition held in Lisbon.

Silva won a silver medal in the mixed team relay at the 2025 European Cross Country Championships in Portugal. In February 2026, she placed second with her Sporting CP team in the mixed relay at the ECCC Cross Country in Albufeira, Portugal.

In May 2026, Silva ran a personal best 4:00.40 in the 1500 metres at the 2026 Meeting International Mohammed VI d'Athlétisme de Rabat and on 4 June she ran 4:00.86 to place fifth at the 2026 Golden Gala in Rome, both events part of the 2026 Diamond League. She ran a new propane best of 3:58.74 for the 1500 m on 28 June at the 2026 Meeting de Paris. In July, she won the Portuguese national title over 5000 m in 15:22.48. On 16 August, she won the bronze medal in the 1500 metres at the 2026 European Athletics Championships in Birmingham.

== Personal life ==
Her father, Rui Silva was an Olympic bronze medalist in Athens in 2004, and her mother, Susana Cabral and grandfather Carlos Cabral, were middle-distance runners as well.
