= Georgia Hunter Bell =

British athlete (born 1993)

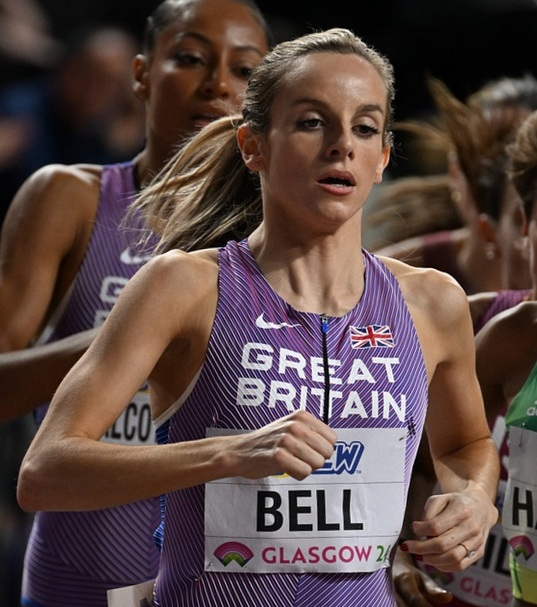
- Bell in 2024

Personal information
- Nationality: British
- Born: Georgia Bell; 17 October 1993 (age 33) Paris, France

Sport
- Sport: Athletics
- Events: Middle distance, Duathlon
- Club: Belgrave Harriers

Achievements and titles
- Olympic finals: 2024 Paris; 1500 m, Bronze
- Personal bests: 800 m: 1:54.90 (Tokyo, 2025); 1500 m: 3:52.61 NR (Paris, 2024); Mile: 4:18.52 (Eugene, 2026); 3000 m: 8:36.96 (Boston, 2025)
Medal record
Women's athletics
Representing Great Britain
Olympic Games
Bronze medal – third place	2024 Paris	1500 m
World Championships
Silver medal – second place	2025 Tokyo	800 m
World Ultimate Championship
Runner-up	2026 Budapest	1500 m
World Indoor Championships
Gold medal – first place	2026 Toruń	1500 m
Silver medal – second place	2025 Nanjing	1500 m
European Championships
Gold medal – first place	2026 Birmingham	1500 m
Silver medal – second place	2024 Rome	1500 m
Representing England
Commonwealth Games
Gold medal – first place	2026 Glasgow	800 m

Georgia Hunter Bell (née Bell; born 17 October 1993) is an English track and field athlete who competes as a middle distance runner. She is the reigning World Indoor Champion and European Champion in the 1500 metres, having won the titles in a British indoor record time at the 2026 World Indoor Championships, and the 2026 European Championships respectively. She is also the reigning Commonwealth Games champion in the 800 metres from 2026, winning all three titles in the same season, in addition to the National title in the 800 metres, and a second place finish in the 1500 metres at the 2026 World Athletics Ultimate Championship.

A promising junior runner who returned to the sport after a hiatus, she won a bronze medal in the 1500 m at the 2024 Summer Olympics, running a new national record time. That year, she also won the silver medal at the 2024 European Athletics Championships and became British national champion, indoors and outdoors, in the 1500 metres. She retained her national indoors title and won the UK national outdoors title over 800 metres in 2025 and 2026, and won the silver medal over that distance at the 2025 World Championships.

== Early life ==
Bell was a high-achieving junior competitor, winning the English Schools title at under-15 level over 800 metres, and clocking a time of 2:08.81, which placed her eighth on the UK all-time list. She also won silver in the same championships as an under-17 in 2009. She attended Cardinal Vaughan Memorial School and studied geography at the University of Birmingham. In 2015, after winning the BUCS (British Universities & Colleges Sport) indoor 800 metres title and silver at the England Athletics Under-23 Championships, she started at University of California, Berkeley.

== Career ==
Bell secured a track scholarship in the United States as a junior athlete, competing collegiately before stepping away from the sport for five years, partly due to injuries. She returned to London and worked in technology sales.

Her athletics comeback was sparked during the COVID-19 pandemic, when restrictions led her back to running. Participation in her local Parkrun and rapid improvements in form prompted her to reconnect with her former coach, join local club Belgrave Harriers and resume competitive racing.

She became a training partner of Keely Hodgkinson, guided by coaches Jenny Meadows and Trevor Painter. In April 2023, she won the Duathlon World Championships in the female 30-34 age group, in Ibiza.

In 2023, she improved her personal bests over 1500 m, 3000 m and 5000 m on the track, and set a new road 10k personal best in Telford, in December 2023.

=== 2024: Olympic medalist ===
In January 2024, Bell ran a new personal best over 1500 metres, running 4:03.54 in winning the World Athletics Indoor Tour Bronze event in Dortmund. The following week, Bell beat pre-race favourite Sembo Almayew for victory over 3000 m in Val-de-Reuil in another lifetime best time of 8:42.16. In February 2024, she lowered her 1500 m personal best to 4:03.22 in Stockholm. On 18 February 2024, she won the final at the 2024 British Indoor Athletics Championships in Birmingham of the 1500 metres to become British indoor champion.

She was selected to compete for Britain at the 2024 World Athletics Indoor Championships in Glasgow. She qualified for the final of the women's 1500 metres race, with a time of 4:04.39. She finished fourth in the final with a time of 4:03.47.

In May 2024, she finished sixth in the 1500 metres at the 2024 Doha Diamond League in a time of 4:03.72. That month she also ran a personal best 800 metres time of 1:59.93 in Andújar. Bell ran a 4:00.41 personal best for the 1500 m at the 2024 Prefontaine Classic in Eugene, Oregon.

Selected to run the 1500 metres for Britain at the 2024 European Athletics Championships in Rome, she won the silver medal. Later that month, she won the 1500 metres at the 2024 British Athletics Championships in Manchester.

Her place at the 2024 Summer Olympics was officially confirmed when Team GB named their athletics team on 5 July 2024. A few days later she set a 3:56.54 personal best in the 1500 metres at the 2024 Meeting de Paris, to go No.2 on the UK all-time rankings, and set an English national record. On 20 July 2024, she improved her 800 m personal best to 1:56.28 at the London Diamond League. At the 2024 Paris Olympics, Bell won a bronze medal in the women's 1500 m. To do so, she broke Laura Muir's British record, running a time of 3:52.61. In September 2024, she finished second in the 800 metres at the Diamond League final in Brussels, and finished seventh in the 1500 metres at the same event. She later announced that she was turning professional rather than return to her cyber security job after her sabbatical.

=== 2025: World Championships medalist ===
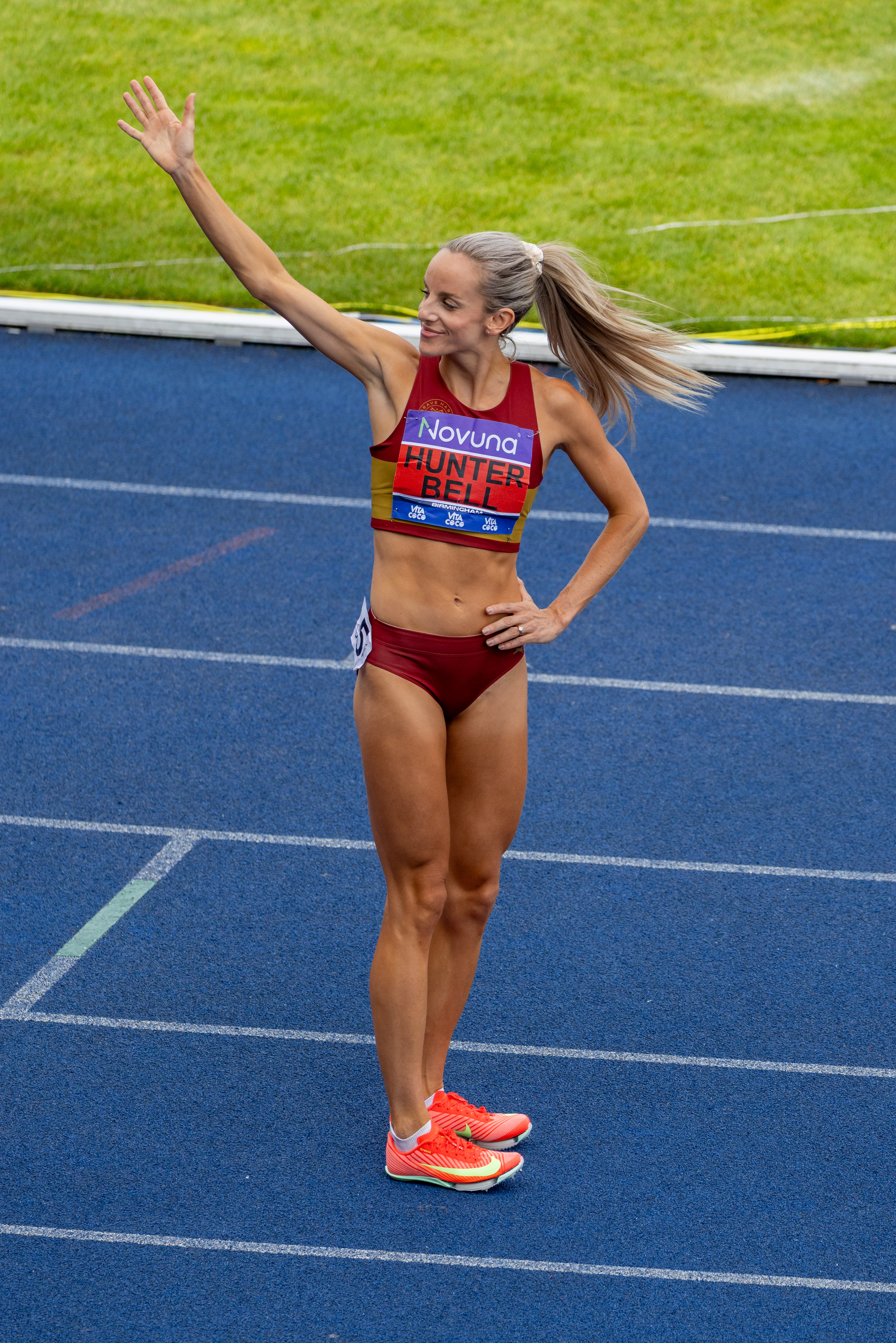
Hunter Bell at the UK Championships in Birmingham

She ran a 3000 m personal best of 8:36.96 to finish sixth at the New Balance Indoor Grand Prix on 2 February 2025. The following weekend, on 8 February, she ran a personal best of 4:23.35 for the indoor mile to win the Millrose Games in New York City.

On 23 February, she won the gold medal in the 1,500 metres at the British Indoor Championships for the second year in a row. At the 2025 European Athletics Indoor Championships in Apeldoorn, Hunter-Bell finished fourth in the 1,500 metres. She was named in the British team for the World Indoor Championships in March, where she won her heat to qualify for the final, before finishing third to win the bronze medal in an indoor 1500 metres personal best time of 3:59.84, close to the British record of 3:59.58. On 26 February 2026, Hunter-Bell's position was upgraded to second place and her medal upgraded to silver following Diribe Welteji's suspension for an anti-doping rule violation.

In May 2025, she was named as a challenger for the short distance category at the 2025 Grand Slam Track event in Philadelphia, finishing fourth in the 1500 metres race and a close runner-up to overall slam winner Diribe Welteji in the 800 metres in a time of 1:58.94. She won the 800 metres in 1:57.66 at the BAUHAUS-galan event in Stockholm, part of the 2025 Diamond League. She ran a season's best of 3:54.76 for the 1500 metres to finish fourth at the Prefontaine Classic on 5 July.

On 19 July 2025, she won the 800 metres at the London Diamond League in a time of one minute 56.74 seconds. On 3 August, she became the British 800 metres champion after winning the 800 metres title at the 2025 UK Athletics Championships in Birmingham. Amid ongoing speculation over her decision whether to run the 800 metres, 1500 metres, or both at the upcoming world championships, she placed third in 3:56.00 over 1500 metres at the Diamond League event in Silesia on 16 August 2025. On the 20 August, she finished third behind Keely Hodgkinson and Audrey Werro over 800 m in 1:57.55 at the Athletissima event in Lausanne. She ran a 800 m personal best of 1:55.96 to finish behind Werro in second at the Diamond League Final in Zurich on 28 August to move to third on the British all-time list. She chose to be selected only for the 800 metres as part of the British team for the 2025 World Athletics Championships in Tokyo, Japan, where she secured a silver medal with a personal best time of 1:54.90 finishing ahead of Hodgkinson and behind Lilian Odira of Kenya. On 10 October, she finished runner-up to Keeley Hodgkinson over 800 metres at the Athlos meet in New York.

=== 2026: World Indoor, Commonwealth, and European champion ===
Hunter Bell began her 2026 indoor season with wins over 1500 metres in February on the World Athletics Indoor Tour in Karlsruhe (4:00.04) and Liévin (4:00.21), but missed the British Indoor Championships with illness. On 1 March in Glasgow, she ran her first indoor 800 m since 2015, running an indoor personal best of 1:57.80 to break the Scottish all-comers' 800 m record and move third on the British all-time list. Competing at the 2026 World Athletics Indoor Championships in Toruń, Poland, she advanced to the final of the 1500 m after winning her heat. Hunter Bell won gold in the final on 22 March, finishing with a British indoor record time of 3:58.53, surpassing Laura Muir's British record.

Competing outdoors, Hunter Bell finished in second in the 1500 m at the Maurie Plant Meet in Melbourne, Australia on 27 March 2026, finishing with a time of 4:01.52, 0.22 seconds behind Claudia Hollingsworth. On 4 June, she won over 1500 metres in the 2026 Diamond League event in Rome. On 21 June, she set a new championship record as she retained her national 800 metres title at the UK Championships in 1:55.93, surpassing the previous mark set by Kelly Holmes. On 28 June, she won her second 1500 m Diamond League race of the season, finishing ahead of Freweyni Hailu in 3:55.63 at the Meeting de Paris. She ran a personal best of 4:18.52 for the mile run at the Prefontaine Classic on 4 July. On 31 July, she won the gold medal in the 800 metres at the 2026 Commonwealth Games in Glasgow, ahead of reigning outdoor world champion Lilian Odira.

On 16 August, she won the gold medal in the 1500 metres at the 2026 European Athletics Championships in Birmingham, finishing ten metres clear of the field having controlled the pace of the race before running a 58.44 seconds final lap to finish in a time of 4:07.78. With the victory, she won her seventh international medal within two years of competition. On 27 August, she ran a season's best of 1:55.03 for the 800 metres at the Weltklasse Zürich, her second fastest time ever for the distance behind the 2025 World Championship final. At the Diamond League Final in Brussels on 5 September, she placed fourth over 1500 metres with a time of 3:56.40 and admitted after the race that she was beginning to fatigue after a long season. On 12 September, Hunter Bell finished second to Klaudia Kazimierska at the inaugural World Ultimate Championship in Budapest in 3:57.72. On 18 September, she finished as runner-up to Kazimierska in the mile at Athlos in London. She was nominated for women’s European Athlete of the Year for 2026.

== Competition results ==
=== International competitions ===
Year	Competition	Venue	Position	Event	Notes
Representing Great Britain / England
2024	World Indoor Championships	Glasgow, United Kingdom	4th	1500 m	4:03.47
2024	European Championships	Rome, Italy	2nd	1500 m	4:05.33
2024	Olympic Games	Paris, France	3rd	1500 m	3:52.61
2025	European Indoor Championships	Apeldoorn, Netherlands	4th	1500 m	4:08.45
2025	World Indoor Championships	Nanjing, China	3rd	1500 m	3:59.84
2025	World Championships	Tokyo, Japan	2nd	800 m	1:54.90
2026	World Indoor Championships	Toruń, Poland	1st	1500 m	3:58.53
2026	Commonwealth Games	Glasgow, United Kingdom	1st	800 m	1:59.51
2026	European Championships	Birmingham, United Kingdom	1st	1500 m	4:07.78
2026	Ultimate Championship	Budapest, Hungary	2nd	1500 m	3:57.72

=== National championships and competitions ===
Year	Competition	Venue	Position	Event	Time
2009	England Championships, U20 events	Bedford	—	800 m	2:10.38
2014	England Championships, U23 events	Bedford	2nd	800 m	2:03.38
2014	British Championships	Birmingham	—	800 m	2:06.03
2015	British Indoor Championships	Sheffield	—	800 m	2:07.12
2015	England Championships, U23 events	Bedford	4th	1500 m	4:24.12
2015	British Championships	Birmingham	—	1500 m	4:28.19
2024	British Indoor Championships	Birmingham	1st	1500 m	4:09.66
2024	British Championships	Manchester	1st	1500 m	4:10.69
2025	British Indoor Championships	Birmingham	1st	1500 m	4:13.23
2025	British Championships	Birmingham	1st	800 m	1:59.53
2026	British Championships	Birmingham	1st	800 m	1:55.93

=== Circuit performances ===
Grand Slam Track results
Slam	Race group	Event	Pl.	Time	Prize money
2025 Philadelphia Slam	Short distance	1500 m	4th	4:00.85	US$30,000
2025 Philadelphia Slam	Short distance	800 m	2nd	1:58.99	US$30,000

== Personal life ==
She previously worked for a London-based firm that studies cyber attacks. She is the daughter of political journalist Andy Bell and Angela Bell, a school PE teacher. She is the great-granddaughter of First World War officer and diarist Edwin Campion Vaughan. She has two sisters. She married George Hunter in West Sussex on 19 October 2024.
