= Nele Weßel =

German athlete (born 1999)

Personal information
- Nationality: German
- Born: 6 November 1999 (age 26)

Sport
- Sport: Athletics
- Event: Middle distance running

Achievements and titles
- Personal bests: 1500 m: 4:03.57 (Tokyo, 2025)

Nele Weßel (born 6 November 1999) is a German middle-distance runner. She is the daughter of Kathrin Weßel.

== Biography ==
Weßel made her senior championship debut at the 2024 European Athletics Championships in Rome 2024 where she placed eleventh in the final. She was promoted to the final after a protest from the German federation when another competitor caused her to fall during her preliminary heat.

Later that month, she set a new personal best over 1500 metres of 4:04.24 whilst racing in Bydgoszcz, Poland. She was runner-up in the 1500 metres at the German Athletics Championships on 30 June 2024.

Weßel competed in the 1500 metres at the 2024 Summer Olympics in Paris in August 2024.

In September 2025, she was a finalist over 1500 metres at the 2025 World Championships in Tokyo, Japan, running a personal best 4:03.57 in the heats.

In February 2026, she won the 3000 metres race at the German Indoor Championships. In March 2026, she competed over 1500 m at the 2026 World Athletics Indoor Championships in Poland, placing sixth in her heat.

== Personal life ==
She is the daughter of German distance runner Kathrin Weßel, who also competed at the Olympic Games.
