= Augustine Haquet =

French middle-distance runner (born 2003)

Personal information
- Born: 13 July 2003 (age 23) Clamart, France
- Height: 177 cm (5 ft 10 in)
- Weight: 60 kg (132 lb)

Sport
- Country: France
- Sport: Athletics
- Events: Middle-distance running, Cross country running

Augustine Haquet (born 13 July 2003) is a French middle-distance runner. She won the French Indoor Athletics Championships in 2026 in the 3000 metres.

== Biography ==
A member of Union Athlétique Versailles (UAV), she also competed for Cornell University in the United States before later pursuing a master's degree in public affairs at Sciences Po in Paris.

Having returned to France, she began training with Team Demi-fond Yvelines Performance alongside Camille Place. In October 2025, Haquet won the bronze medal in the 5km at the French road championships in 16:12, behind Place. Competing indoors, Haquet won the French Indoor Athletics Championships in 2026 in the 3000 metres.

Throughout the 2026 season, she lowered her 1500 metres personal best by nine seconds from 4:12.68 to 4:03.56, which she ran on 18 July 2026 in Belgium. Later that month, she placed fourth in the 1500 metres at the French Outdoor Championships in Albi. In August, Haquet qualified for the final of the 1500 metres at the 2026 European Athletics Championships in Birmingham, England, placing tenth overall.
