= Andy Bell (journalist) =

British journalist

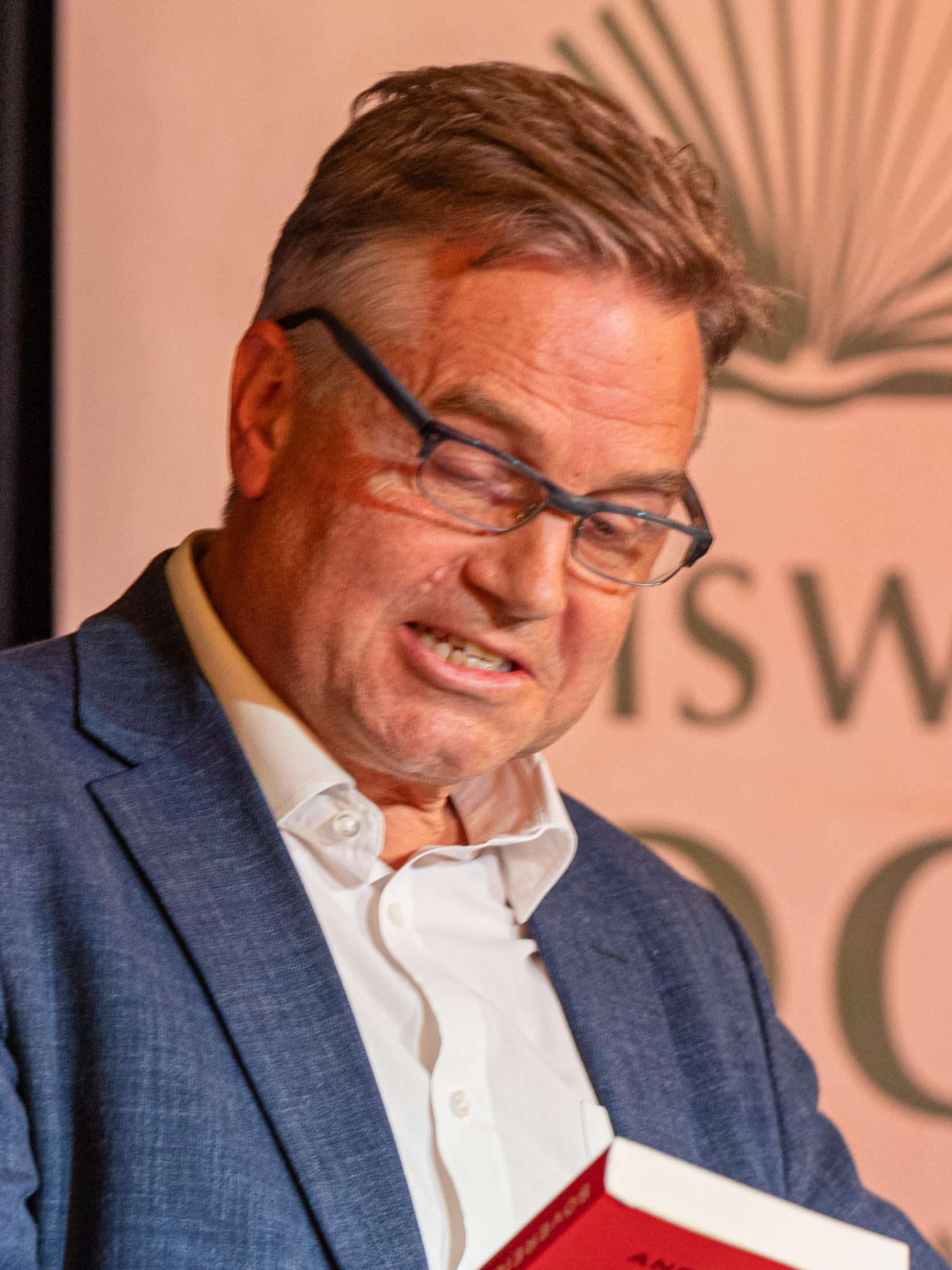
Bell at the 2024 Chiswick Book Festival

Andy Bell (born 1963) is a British journalist covering politics.

== Early life ==
Bell is a History graduate from Corpus Christi College, Cambridge, and won a Thouron scholarship to study International Relations at the University of Pennsylvania.

== Career ==
Bell worked for the BBC as their Foreign Affairs editor of Today and was their Paris correspondent. He joined ITN's 5 News in April 1999. A 2012 study showed that in his role as political editor, Bell had featured in a fifth of all Channel 5 news coverage and more than 40% of all their live coverage.

In December 2023, his debut novel Sovereign Territory was announced through Biteback Publishing.

== Personal life ==
Bell has documented the diaries of his grandfather Edwin Campion Vaughan, who fought with the British Army in World War One. He is married to Angela Bell. They have three children. His daughter Georgia Hunter Bell is a British champion middle distance-runner. She won a bronze medal at the 2024 Summer Olympics and a silver medal at the 2025 World Athletics Championships.
