= Jodie McCann =

Irish athlete (born 2000)

Personal information
- Nationality: Irish
- Born: 3 February 2000 (age 26)

Sport
- Sport: Athletics
- Events: Middle distance, long distance, cross country running

Achievements and titles
- Personal bests: 1500 m: 4:08.34 (Adelaide, 2024); Mile: 4:32.54 (Sydney, 2024); 3000 m: 8:52.92 (Sydney, 2024); 5000 m: 15:20.93 (Oslo, 2024)

Jodie McCann (born 3 February 2000) is an Irish long distance runner. In 2024, she became national champion over 5000 metres.

== Early life ==
From Dublin, she took up athletics at the age of nine years-old. She mostly competed in cross country running until she was 17 years-old. She attended Rathdown School and won national age group titles and received scholarship offers to study in the United States, but opted to study primary school teaching at the DCU Institute of Education, graduating in 2022.

== Career ==
In December 2018, she competed in the U20 competition at the 2018 European Cross Country Championships in Tilburg. In November 2019, she won the Irish U20 cross country title. She was subsequently the first placed Irish U20 runner at the 2019 European Cross Country Championships in Lisbon, Portugal.

Running for Dublin City Harriers, she was the leading Irish woman finishing fourth at the Northern Ireland International Cross-Country and Bobby Rea Cross-Country, held in Dundonald in October 2022.

In August 2023, she trained for a few months with the On Athletics Club Oceania in Melbourne, coached by former world 5,000m medallist Craig Mottram. In February 2024, she set new 1,500m and 5,000m personal bests, running 4:08.34 for the 1500 metres in Adelaide, and 15:35.04 for the 5000 metres in Melbourne. In April 2024, she lowered her 5,000m personal best to 15:30.20 in Hiroshima, Japan.

She was selected to represent Ireland in the 5000 metres at the 2024 European Athletics Championships in Rome, placing seventeenth overall. That month, she lowered her personal best over 5000 metres again, to 15:20.93 in Oslo.

She won the 5000 metres title at the Irish Championships in Dublin in June 2024, running a time of 15:44.80. She competed in the 5000 metres at the 2024 Summer Olympics in Paris in August 2024.

She was selected for the Irish team for the 2025 European Athletics Indoor Championships in Apeldoorn, where she ran in the 3000 metres race.

Competing in France on 24 January 2026, she placed third in the 1500m at the Meeting Indoor de Lyon, a World Athletics Indoor Tour Bronze meeting, in 4:11.51. At the Meeting de l’Eure in France on 1 February, McCann ran the mile in an indoor personal best of 4:38.66. In August, she competed at the 2026 European Athletics Championships in Birmingham, England, in the 1500 metres.

== Personal life ==
Her mother was born in Australia and she has dual nationality. Her mother was a fitness instructor and her father a competitive swimmer. Her brother Luke McCann is also an international runner.
