= Ingeborg Østgård =

Norwegian athlete (born 2003)

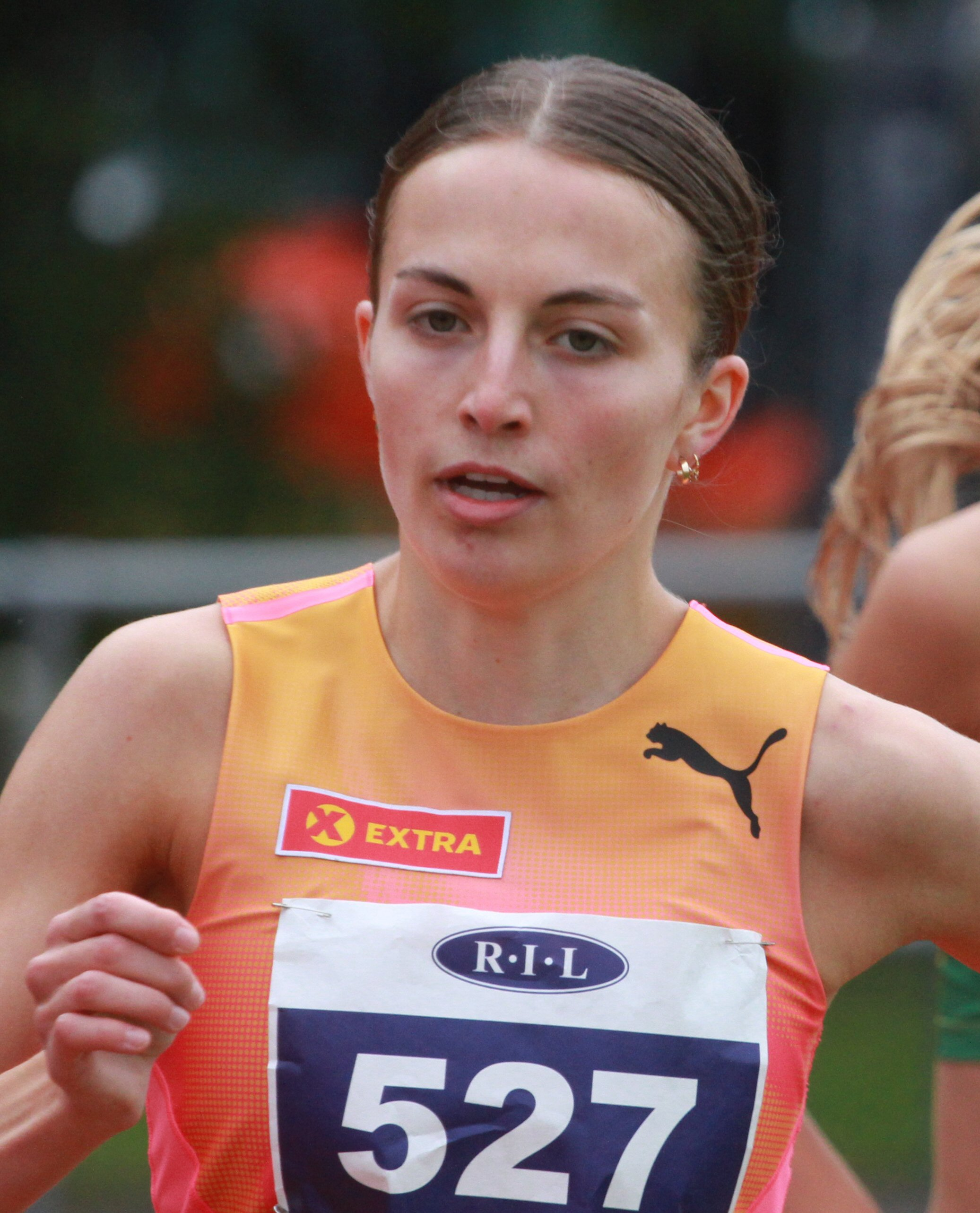

Personal information
- Born: 5 October 2003 (age 22)

Sport
- Sport: Athletics
- Events: Middle-distance running, Cross country running

Achievements and titles
- Personal bests: 800m: 2:03.30 (Kristiansand, 2021); 1500m: 4:08.84 (Dessau, 2025); Mile: 4:37.10 (Moelv, 2022); 3000m: 9:07.38 (Jessheim, 2024)
Medal record
Women's athletics
Representing Norway
European U20 Championships
| Gold medal – first place | 2021 Tallinn | 1500 m |
European Cross Country Championships
| Silver medal – second place | 2021 Dublin | U20 race |

Ingeborg Østgård (born 5 October 2003) is a Norwegian middle-distance and cross country runner. She is a multiple-time national champion over 1500 metres.

== Biography ==
She was a skier in her early years before focusing on athletics, and is a member of Ren-Eng IL. She was the Nordic junior champion in cross country running, both individually and in the team race as a 16 year-old in November 2019.

She won the gold medal in the 1500 meters at the 2021 European Athletics U20 Championships. She became senior Norwegian champion over 1500 metres for the first time at the Norwegian Athletics Championships in September 2021. She was runner-up to Megan Keith of Great Britain in the U20 race at the 2021 European Cross Country Championships in Dublin, Ireland.

She ran a personal best 4.09.91 for the 1500 metres at the 2022 Bislett Games. She retained her Norwegian national title over 1500 metres in June 2022. She placed sixth over 1500 metres at the 2022 World Athletics U20 Championships in Cali, Colombia.

She won the Norwegian national title over 1500 metres for the third consecutive year in July 2023. She won the Norwegian Cross Country Championships in Frognerparken in October 2023. She won the 2024 Norwegian Indoor Athletics Championships in the 1500 metres in February 2024. She competed over 1500 metres at the 2024 European Athletics Championships in Rome, Italy. At the 2024 Norwegian U23 Championships, she placed second in the 1500 metres behind Anne Gine Løvnes, before finishing ahead of Løvnes at the senior Norwegian Championships.

She competed in Apeldoorn, Netherlands, over 1500 metres at the 2025 European Athletics Indoor Championships. She placed third over 1500 metres at the 2025 European Athletics Team Championships Second Division in Maribor, Slovenia. In September 2025, she competed over 1500 metres at the 2025 World Championships in Tokyo, Japan, without advancing to the semi-finals.

In August 2026, she competed at the 2026 European Athletics Championships in Birmingham, England, in the 1500 metres.
