= Agathe Guillemot =

French middle-distance runner (born 1999)

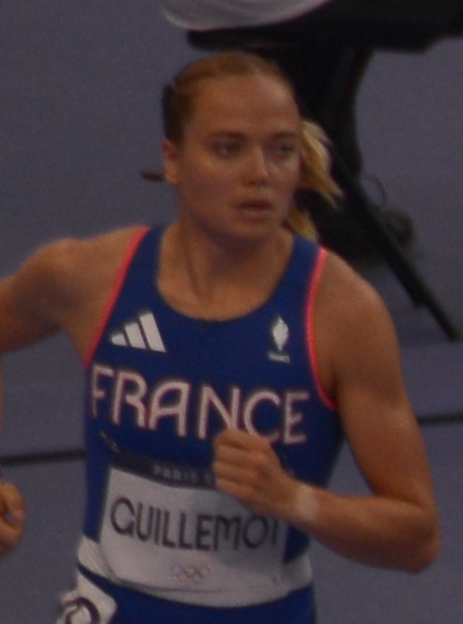
- Guillemot at the 2024 Summer Olympics

Personal information
- Born: 11 July 1999 (age 27) Pont-l'Abbé, France
- Height: 173 cm (5 ft 8 in)
- Weight: 59 kg (130 lb)

Sport
- Country: France
- Sport: Athletics
- Events: 800 m, 1500 m

Achievements and titles
- Personal bests: 400 m: 54.79 (Angers, 2021); 800 m: 1:59.05 (Montreuil, 2026); 1500 m: 3:56.24 NR (Paris, 2026); Mile: 4:19.08 NR (London, 2025); 2000 m: 5:32.63 NR (Monaco, 2024) Indoor; 800 m: 2:00.30 (Miramas, 2026); 1500 m: 3:59.71 NR (Torun, 2026); Mile: 4:23.27 NR (Val-de-Reuil, 2026)
Medal record
Women's athletics
Representing France
Event	1st	2nd	3rd
European Championships	0	0	1
European Indoor Championships	1	0	0
European U23 Championships	0	1	0
Total	1	1	1
European Championships
Bronze medal – third place	2024 Rome	1500 m
European Indoor Championships
Gold medal – first place	2025 Apeldoorn	1500 m
European U23 Championships
Silver medal – second place	2021 Tallinn	4 × 400 m relay
World Road Running Championships
Gold medal – first place	2026 Copenhagen	Mile
World Cross Country Championships
Silver medal – second place	2026 Tallahassee	Mixed relay
European Cross Country Championships
Silver medal – second place	2024 Antalya	Mixed relay
Bronze medal – third place	2025 Lagoa	Team

Agathe Guillemot (French: [aɡat ɡijmo]; born 11 July 1999) is a French middle-distance runner. In July 2023, she became the French national champion over 1500 metres for the first time and set a French national record at the 2024 Olympic Games. In 2025, she became the European Indoor Champion over 1500 metres having previously won the bronze medal at the 2024 European Championships. In 2026 she became the French national record holder in the 1500 metres and the mile run, both outdoors and indoors. She won the mile run at the World Athletics Road Running Championships on 19 September 2026, setting a new European record time. She was a silver medalist in the mixed relay at the 2024 European Cross Country Championships and 2026 World Cross Country Championships.

== Biography ==
From Finistère, Brittany, she is based in Rennes and runs for Haute Bretagne Athlétisme. She won a silver medal in the 4 × 400 meters relay at the 2021 European Athletics U23 Championships in Tallinn.

=== 2023-2024: French champion, European medalist, World Championship and Olympic debut ===
Guillemot ran a new personal best in the mile at the 2023 Diamond League event in Monaco. In July 2023, she became the French national champion over 1500 metres. She was selected for the 1500m at the 2023 World Athletics Championships.

In February 2024, Guillemot broke the French indoor 1500 m record with a run of 4:04.64 at the Meeting Hauts-de-France Pas-de-Calais in Liévin. She was selected to run at the 2024 World Athletics Indoor Championships in Glasgow. She qualified for the final of the women's 1500 metres race, with a time of 4:11.56. She finished seventh in the final with a time of 4:04.94.

She won bronze in the 1500 metres at the 2024 European Athletics Championships in Rome in a time of 4:05.69.

Guillemot set a new French 1500 m national record at the Meeting de Paris finishing in a time of 3:58.05, her first time under the 4-minute barrier. She competed in the 1500 metres at the 2024 Summer Olympics in Paris in August 2024, running a new national record on her way to the final, where she placed ninth.

She was selected for the French mixed relay team at the European Cross Country Championships in Antalya, Turkey, winning the silver medal.

=== 2025: European Indoor Champion ===
She was selected for the 2025 European Athletics Indoor Championships in Appeldoorn, winning gold in the 1500 metres, becoming the first French female to achieve this feat. She finished fourth in the 1500 metres in May 2025 at the 2025 Doha Diamond League. She won the 1500 metres competing for France at the 2025 European Athletics Team Championships First Division in Madrid on 29 June 2025. She set a 2:34.75 personal best over 1000 metres in Monaco at the 2025 Herculis. She ran a season's best 3:58.29 for the 1500 metres at the 2025 Memorial Van Damme in the Diamond League, in Brussels, Belgium on 22 August. She placed ninth in the 1500 metres at the Diamond League Final in Zurich on 28 August. In September 2025, she was a semi-finalist over 1500 metres at the 2025 World Championships in Tokyo, Japan.

She was selected for the 2025 European Cross Country Championships in Portugal on 14 December 2025, and led France to team bronze with Anaëlle Guillonnet and Alessia Zarbo, their first medal in the senior women's race at the Championships since 2015. On 31 December, she placed second at the 5km Cursa dels Nassos, a World Athletics Label event, held in Barcelona.

=== 2026: World Cross Country medalist ===
On 10 January 2026, she was a silver medalist for France in the mixed relay at the 2026 World Athletics Cross Country Championships in Tallahassee, Florida. Competing at the Meeting de l’Eure in Val-de-Reuil, a World Athletics Indoor Tour Silver meeting on 1 February 2026, Guillemot won the mile run in 4:23.77, setting a new national record and taking 2.22 seconds from her previous personal best time from 2025. Later that month in Karlsruhe, she also set a new French national record for the 1500 metres indoors of 4:02.12, and set a French record of 5:32.18 for the 2000 metres in Liévin, fifth on the world all-time list. Guillemot won in a personal best of 4:00.64, narrowly ahead of Freweyni Hailu in a sprint finish over 1500 metres at the Copernicus Cup in Toruń on 22 February 2026. She won the 1500 metres title at the 2026 French Indoor Athletics Championships in Aubiere.

Competing at the 2026 World Athletics Indoor Championships in Toruń, Guillemot advanced to the final of the 1500 m after winning her heat, before placing fourth overall in a French indoor record of 3:59.71.

On 31 May, she was third behind Ethiopians Freweyni Hailu and Haregeweyni Kalayu in 3:59.60 in the 1500 metres at the 2026 Meeting International Mohammed VI d'Athlétisme de Rabat, and on 4 June ran 4:00.46 to place fourth at the 2026 Golden Gala in Rome, both events part of the 2026 Diamond League. On 17 June, she ran a personal best 1:59.05 over 800 metres at the Meeting de Montreuil to finish runner-up to Smilla Kolbe. On 28 June, she set a new French national record over 1500 metres with 3:56.24 at the 2026 Meeting de Paris. On 25 July 2026, she won the 1500 metres at the 2026 French Championships, pulling clear of Adele Gay with an explosive final lap. On 16 August, she placed fourth in the final of the 1500 metres in a slow tactical race at the 2026 European Championships in Birmingham, England. At the 2026 Diamond League Final in Brussels in September, she placed sixth over 1500 metres. The following week, she placed eighth over 1500 m at the inaugural World Ultimate Championship in Budapest. She won the mile run at the World Athletics Road Running Championships on 19 September 2026, setting a European record of 4:22.74, a time which moved her to fourth on the world all-time list.
