= Weronika Lizakowska =

Polish athlete (born 1998)

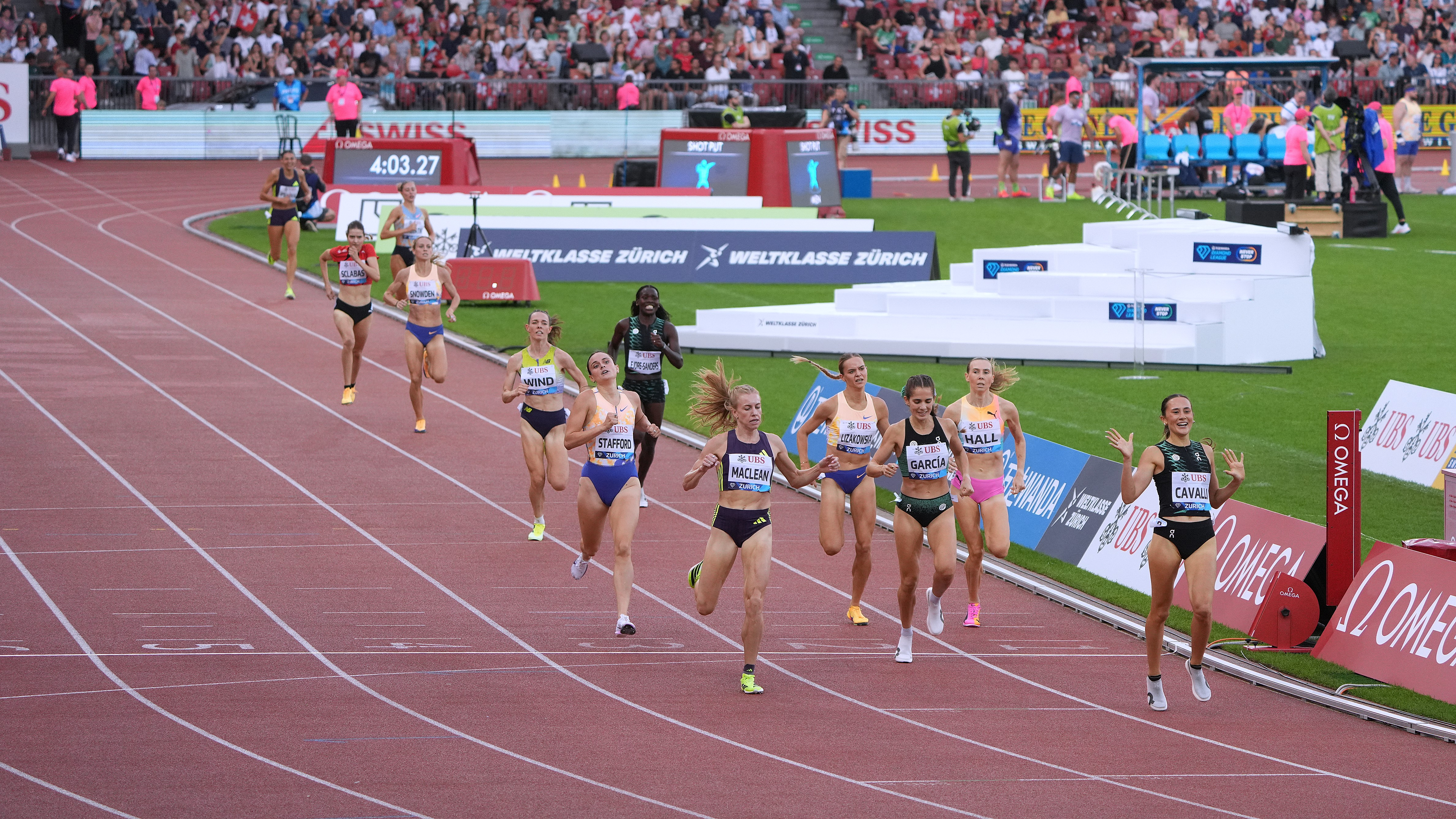
- At the 2026 Weltklasse Zürich

Personal information
- Nationality: Poland
- Born: 2 November 1998 (age 28)

Sport
- Sport: Athletics
- Event: 1500m

Achievements and titles
- Personal bests: 800m 2:02.91 (Schifflange, 2024); 1500m 3:57.31 (Paris, 2024); One Mile 4:28.62 (Bydgoszcz, 2023); One Mile Road 4:37.04 (Riga, 2023)

Weronika Lizakowska (born 2 November 1998) is a Polish track and field athlete who competes as a middle-distance runner.

== Early life ==
Lizakowska graduated with a bachelor's degree in mathematics from the University of Gdańsk.

== Career ==
=== Junior career ===
In 2015, Lizakowska took first place in the 1500m run at the 21st National Youth Olympics held in Łódź. In 2016, she competed at the 2016 European Cross Country Championships that took place in Chia, Sardinia, Italy. She was selected for the Polish team to compete in the 1500m at the European U20 Championships held in Grosseto, Italy in 2017. She won gold over 3 km in 2018 at the Polish Academic Championships.

=== Senior career ===
Competing for the Kościerzyna Student Sports Club, Remus Kościerzyna, she finished third at the Polish national championships in 2022 in the 10,000m. In February 2023, she finished third in the Polish indoor national championships in Ostrava, running a new personal best. Subsequently, she was selected for the Polish team to compete at the European Athletics Indoor Championships held in Istanbul. In August 2023, she finished fourth in the 1500 metres at the University Games, held in Chengdu, China.

In October 2023, she finished thirteenth at the 2023 World Athletics Road Running Championships in Riga, running 4:37.04 in the mile road race.

She competed in the 1500 metres at the 2024 Summer Olympics in Paris in August 2024, running personal best times in her heat and semi-final, without advancing to the final.

She finished ninth in the 1500 metres in May 2025 at the 2025 Doha Diamond League. She represented Poland at the 2025 European Athletics Team Championships First Division in June 2025. In September 2025, she was a semi-finalist over 1500 metres at the 2025 World Championships in Tokyo, Japan.

In August, she competed at the 2026 European Athletics Championships in Birmingham, England, placing ninth in the final of the 1500 metres.

== Personal life ==
Alongside her running career, she works part-time as a private mathematics teacher and by March 2023 was undertaking a master's degree in Pedagogy.

== International competitions ==
Year	Competition	Venue	Position	Event	Notes
Representing Poland
2017	European U20 Championships	Grosseto, Italy	14th (h)	1500 m	4:27.21
2023	European Indoor Championships	Istanbul, Turkey	18th (h)	1500 m	4:23.57
2023	World University Games	Chengdu, China	4th	1500 m	4:17.77
2023	World Road Running Championships	Riga, Latvia	13th	Mile (road)	4:37.04
2024	World Indoor Championships	Glasgow, United Kingdom	9th (h)	1500 m	4:10.50
2024	Olympic Games	Paris, France	7th (sf)	1500 m	3:57.31
2025	European Indoor Championships	Apeldoorn, Netherlands	6th	1500 m	4:09.64
2025	European Indoor Championships	Apeldoorn, Netherlands	10th	3000 m	9:06.84
2025	World Championships	Tokyo, Japan	9th (sf)	1500 m	4:03.39
2026	European Championships	Birmingham, United Kingdom	9th	1500 m	4:11.81
2026	World Road Running Championships	Copenhagen, Denmark	17th	Road mile	4:34.27
