= Anne Gine Løvnes =

Norwegian middle-distance runner

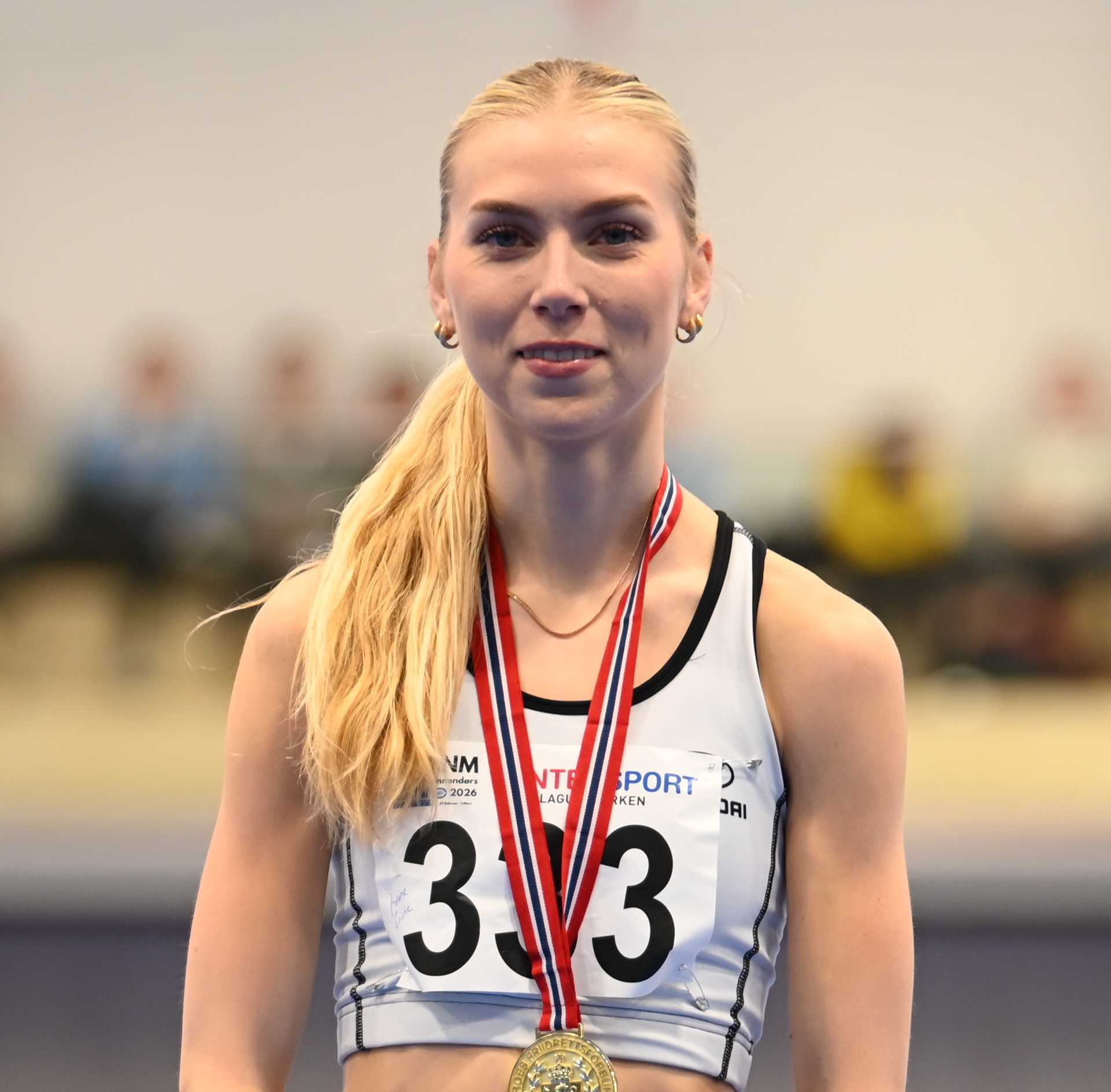
- Løvnes in 2026

Personal information
- Born: 14 March 2003 (age 23)

Sport
- Sport: Athletics
- Event: Middle-distance running

Anne Gine Løvnes (born 14 March 2003) is a Norwegian middle-distance runner. She has won Norwegian national titles over 1500 metres both indoors and outdoors, as well as the 3000 metres indoors.

== Biography ==
In August 2022, Løvnes competed in the 2022 World Athletics U20 Championships in Cali, Colombia, where she reached the semi-finals of the 800 metres. In 2023, she was selected to compete in the 2023 European Athletics U23 Championships in Espoo, Finland, where she ran the 800 metres.

At the 2024 senior Norwegian Indoor Championships, she placed third in the 1500 metres. She competed in the 2024 Nordic Indoor Championships in Athletics, finishing fifth in the 1500 metres. At the 2024 Norwegian Championships, she placed second in the 1500 metres behind Ingeborg Østgård, before finishing ahead of Østgård at the Norwegian U23 Championships. She set a Norwegian under-23 record in the mile run with a time of at The Monument Mile Classic in Stirling, Scotland, with a time of 4:33.89.

Løvnes won the 2025 Norwegian Indoor Championships, in Bærum, running 4:18.96. She competed at the 2025 European Athletics Indoor Championships in Apeldoorn, Netherlands. competed in Apeldoorn, Netherlands, over 1500 metres at the 2025 European Athletics Indoor Championships. She won the 1500 metres at the Norwegian Championahips. She was a finalist in the 1500 metres at the 2025 European Athletics U23 Championships in Bergen, Norway, and the 2025 Summer World University Games in Bochum, Germany. In September 2025, she competed over 1500 metres at the 2025 World Championships in Tokyo, Japan, without advancing to the semi-finals.

Løvnes won both 1500 metres and 3000 metres titles at the 2026 Norwegian Indoor Championships. She competed in the 1500 metres at the 2026 World Athletics Indoor Championships in Toruń, Poland. On 7 June, she ran a personal best 4:06.30 in the 1500 m at the 2026 Bauhausgalan in Stockholm. In August, she competed at the 2026 European Athletics Championships in Birmingham, England, in the 1500 metres.
