= Sophie O'Sullivan =

Irish athlete (born 2001)

- At the 2026 Weltklasse Zürich

Personal information
- Born: 23 December 2001 (age 24) Melbourne, Victoria, Australia
- Relative: Sonia O'Sullivan (mother)

Sport
- Country: Ireland
Medal record
Women's athletics
Representing Ireland
European Athletics U18 Championships
| Silver medal – second place | 2018 Győr | 800 m |
European Athletics U23 Championships
| Gold medal – first place | 2023 Espoo | 1500 m |

Sophie O'Sullivan (born 2001) is an Australian and Irish athlete who competes for Ireland. She won a silver medal in the 800 metres at the 2018 European Athletics U18 Championships in Győr, Hungary. O'Sullivan won 1500 metres gold at the 2023 European Athletics U23 Championships in Espoo, Finland. She represented the Washington Huskies at the University of Washington in NCAA track and field competitions. In 2025, she won the NCAA outdoor 1500 m championships in Eugene, Oregon in her final race as a Washington Husky.

== Life ==
Sophie is the daughter of Irish World champion and Olympic Silver medallist Sonia O'Sullivan, and Australian track and field coach Nic Bideau. She has one sister, Ciara.

== Career ==
=== 2023 ===
At the University of Washington Preview Meet on 14 January at the Dempsey Arena in Seattle, O'Sullivan achieved personal bests over the mile (4.36.67, for 6th in her section, and sixth fastest time overall) and the 800 metres (2.05.87, for 1st in her section and 5th overall). She also ran a leg of the 4 X 400 metres relay, where UW finished 4th of 15 teams in 3.56.4. At the University of Washington Invitational Meet on 28 January she ran 3000 m in 9.03.91, to finish second behind Emily Venters of Utah. O'Sullivan's time was 6th fastest in UW history. She also ran the anchor leg in the 4 by 400 relay, where her team finished 2nd in 3.45.21, behind San Diego State.

On 3 February, as part of the University of Washington distance medley relay team, alongside Marlena Preigh, Carley Thomas, and Anna Gibson, she helped the Huskies to victory in the 2023 Bruce Lehane and Scarlet White Women's 4000 m distance medley relay at Boston University Track and Tennis Center, with a 1200 m time of 3.16.24. UW's time of 10:46.62 was a new NCCA record. At the same meet, she finished 8th in the mile race in 4.39.35. At the Huskey Classic in the Dempsey Arena on 11 February O'Sullivan took the lead in the top heat of the women's mile with 200-meters to go and held on to win, lowering her mile PR to 4:33.24, and tying for the No. 5 time in school history. Shortly afterwards, she finished 19th fastest over 800 metres in 2.08.94.

At the Stanford Invitational in Pao Alto, California, on 1 April, O'Sullivan finished 2nd overall in the 1500 metres in 4.17.46. She followed this up on 22 April, again in Pao Alto, CA, as she ran 1500 metres in a 4 X 1500 metres relay in which Washington placed third in 17.15.64. At the Penn Relays on 29 April she helped UW to two top-three finishes, splitting 4:18 as the 4 × 1500 m relay took third, and splitting 2:07 to help the 4 × 800 m relay place second.

On 28 May at the NCAA Preliminaries in Sacramento, CA, O'Sullivan won her 1500 heat in a new PB of 4.08.06 to qualify for the NCCA finals in Austin, Texas on 7–10 June. Her time was the fastest over the distance in University of Washington history, eighth on the Irish all-time list, and 11th on the NCCA all-time list. On 8 June O'Sullivan was fastest qualifier in the 1500 m heats at the NCCA finals in Austin, Texas, running 4:09.58. She was unable to maintain this form in the final on 10 June, finishing 12th in 4.22.81. The race was won by Harvard's Maia Ramsden in 4.08.60.

At the Irish national under 23 Championships in Tullamore, Co. Offaly on 2 July, O'Sullivan scored a double, striking gold at both 800 m (2.10.04) and 1500 m (4.27.02). On 22 June 2023, she won the Division 3 1500m in 4.27.96 to help Ireland win promotion at the European Athletics Team Championships Third Division in Kraków.

On 16 July, O'Sullivan won the 1500 m at the European Under 23 Championships in Espoo, Finland. Her winning time was a new personal best of 4.07.18. She finished ahead of Ireland's Sarah Healy (4:07.36) and Britain's Shannon Flockhart (4:08.37). In the Women's Senior 1500 m at the Irish National Track and Field Championships on 30 July, she (running in the colours of Ballymore-Cobh) was runner up in a time of 4.12.00, behind Sarah Healy (University College Dublin).

On 4 August, O'Sullivan ran 2.37.08 for the 1000 m, the fastest time in US collegiate history, an Irish under-23 record, and the third fastest time by an Irish woman (behind Sonia O'Sullivan and Ciara Mageen), at the CITIUS Meeting, a World Continental Challenge event, at Stadion Wankdorf in Bern, Switzerland. She finished fourth in a race won by Abbie Caldwell of Australia in 2.34.63.

On 19 August, O'Sullivan competed in the heats of the Women's 1500 m at the 2023 World Athletics Championships. She improved her personal best to 4.02.15, finishing 8th in her heat, and just missing out on qualification for the next round. Her time of 4.02.15 is quicker than the qualifying standard for the 2024 Olympic Games in Paris. O'Sullivan's time was fifth fastest by an Irish woman, with national record holder Ciara Mageen (3.55.87) ranked first.

On 5 September, at the Palio Citta' Della Quercia in Rovereto, Italy, O'Sullivan finished second in the 3000 m in 8.44.72, behind Wubrist Aschal (Ethiopia). O'Sullivan's time broke the Irish under 23 record, and was the third fastest ever by an Irish woman, behind Mary Cullen (8:43.74i) and Sonia O'Sullivan (8:21.64). On 8 September 2023, O'Sullivan achieved a personal best of 2.01.43 over 800 m at the Volksbank Trier Flutlichtmeeting in Moselstadion, Trier in Germany, finishing second behind Vivian Chetbet Kiprotich of Kenya. This time was 12th fastest on the Irish all-time rankings, behind national record holder Ciara Mageen (1.59.27) in first.

On 27 October, running on her home course at Chambers Creek Regional Park in University Place, Washington in the 2023 PAC 12 cross-country championship, O'Sullivan finished in sixth position over a 6k course, and led the Washington Huskies to the team title. Her time was 19.33.80.

On 18 November, O'Sullivan competed in the NCAA Division 1 Cross Country National championships at Panorama Farms near Charlottesville, Virginia. She finished in 56th position in 20.16 over a 6K course, and helped the Washington Huskies to finish in 8th position in the team race. Sophie went through 1000 meters in 21st position (2.27), 2000 m in 26th (6.20), 3000 m in 39th (9.50), 4000 m in 60th (13.19), and 5000 m in 65th (17.02), before rallying to 56th over the last kilometer. The winner was Parker Valby of Florida in 18.55, with 2022 champion Katelyn Tuohy of North Carolina State in 5th in 19.23. NC State won the team race.

=== 2024 ===
On 28 January, O'Sullivan opened her indoor season with a third-place finish in the mile at the University of Washington/Mile City event at the Dempsey Arena in Seattle. Her time was 4:35.63, two seconds outside her personal best. On February 24, she finished sixth in the mile at the University of Washington's Ken Shanahan Last Chance meet in 4.38.98.

On 10 May, O'Sullivan opened her outdoor season by winning her heat in the 1500 metres at the Pac-12 Track and Field Championships at Potts Field in Boulder, Colorado. She ran a time of 4.21.33. In the 1500 metres final on 12 May, O'Sullivan finished seventh in 4.22.72, behind Washington teammate Chloe Forester, whose winning time was 4.16.33. O'Sullivan also ran the 5,000 metres, finishing in 18th position, in 17:30.40.

At the NCAA West Regionals at John McDonnell Field, Fayetteville, Arkansas, on 23 May, O'Sullivan placed second in heat 4 in the first round of the 1500 metres in a time of 4.20.35, thereby qualifying for the quarter-finals. On 25 May at the same meet, O'Sullivan finished second in heat one of the quarter finals in 4.09.61 behind Juliet Cherubet of Texas Tech (4.09.04) to qualify for the NCCA finals at Eugene, Oregon on 5–8 June.

In the NCAA semifinals in Eugene, Oregon on 6 June, O'Sullivan finished in fourth position in heat 1 of the 1500 metres, qualifying automatically for her second consecutive outdoor final in a season best of 4.08.04, the eight fastest time among 12 qualifiers. In the final on 8 June O'Sullivan finished in 12th position, in a time of 4.13.39. The race was won by Harvard's Maia Ramsden in 4.06.62.

On 16 June, at the Folksam GP Sollentuna in Sweden, O'Sullivan finished 10th in the 1500 metres in 4.22.93.

On 29 June, at Morton Stadium, Santry, Dublin, O'Sullivan won her heat at the National Senior Championships over 1500 m in 4.26.21 O'Sullivan won her first national senior title in the final on 30 June, running the same distance in 4.20.25, ahead of Carla Sweeney (4.21.13) and Madison Mooney (4.21.70).

On 9 July, at the Cork City Sports at the Munster Technological College in Bishopstown, O'Sullivan ran a time of 9.08.66 to finish 12th in the 3000 metres. On 12 July she ran a season's best of 4.05.77 over 1500 metres when she finished second behind Shannon Flockhart (4.04.98) at the Morton Games, at the Morton Stadium in Dublin. On 14 July, O'Sullivan ran a PB of 2.00.08 to finish fifth in the 800 metres at the Meeting Sport e Solidarietà Lignano at the Stadio G. Teghil, Lignano Sabbiadoro in Italy, behind Italy's Eloisa Coiro, who won the race in 1.59.26. O'Sullivan's time moved her to 4th on the Irish all-time list.

On 6 August O'Sullivan finished 7th in her 1500 m first round heat at the Paris Olympics in a personal best of 4.00.23, behind the winner, Gudaf Tesgaey of Ethiopa (3.58.84). As only the first six qualified directly for the semi-finals, O'Sullivan ran in the repechage on 7 August. O'Sullivan's time was 8th fastest among all first round athletes. O'Sullivan's time moved her to fourth on the Irish all-time list, behind Ciara Mageean (3.55.87), Sarah Healy (3.5746) and Sonia O'Sullivan (3.58.85). It was also inside the qualifying standard for next year's World Athletics Championship in Japan. O'Sullivan's 4th place in the repechage on 7 August was not enough to gain a place in the semi-final. Her time was 4.03.07 in a race won by Ethiopia's Birke Haylom.

On 19 October, O'Sullivan opened her 2024 cross-country season by finishing 42nd at the Wisconsin pre-nationals, covering the 6K course in 20.10.4, and averaging 5.24.6 per mile. O'Sullivan finished fifth and final scorer on the second-placed Washington Huskies team. On 1 November, at the Big Ten Cross-country Championships in Savoy, IL, O'Sullivan was again fifth scorer for the Huskies, as they finished runner up behind Oregon. She finished in 18th place, in 19.45, after passing 11 runners over the final kilometre. At the NCCA West Regional Cross-country at Cofax, Washington on 15 November, O'Sullivan finished 33rd position in 20.27 over 6 km and was fifth Huskie over the line, helping the team to take third place behind Oregon and Stanford. On November 23, O'Sullivan finished in 135th place at the NCCA Division 1 Cross-country Championship at Thomas Zimmer Championship Course in Madison, Wisconsin. She finished fifth scorer for the Huskies, who finished 13th overall. O'Sullivan picked up 40 places over the final kilometer. O'Sullivan's time over 8K was 20.45.

O'Sullivan finished in 8th position over one mile on the road at the Kalākaua Merrie Mile in Honolulu, Hawaii on December 7, in 4.39.33, in a race won by Nikki Hiltz (USA) in 4.28.65.

=== 2025 ===
Sophie opened up her 2025 campaign with a win over 1500 metres at the Perth Track Classic in Australia on March 1 in 4.06.74. On March 21, she finished sixth in the third heat of the 1500 metres at the World Indoors Athletics Championships in Nanjing, China in 4.16.68, a new personal best indoors. On March 29, Sophie finished 8th over 1500 metres at the Maurie Plant Continental Tour meet at Lakeside Statium in Melbourne, Australia, in 4.12.91, behind Australians Claudia Hollingsworth (4.05.97), Sarah Billings (4.06.37) and Linden Hall (4.06.89) in the podium places.

On April 17, Sophie returned to NCCA competition at the Bryan Clay invitational at Azusa, CA, and finished in third position in the elite 800 m in 2.00.61, behind Michaela Rose of LSU (2.00.22) and Maggi Condon of Northern Arizona (2.00.27). On April 18, at the same meet, Sophie was third in the elite 1500m in 4.08.69, behind Chloe Florster (also representing Washington) (4.05.75) and Maggi Congdon (4.07.23).

On April 26, at the Penn Relays, Sophie contributed to Washington's second place in the 4 by 1500 relay, in 17.10.88, the fastest time ever for the Huskey women, along with teammates Mia Cochran, Amina Matoug and Chloe Foerster. Some 90 minutes later, Sophie, along with teammates Claire Yerby, Chloe Foerster, and Maggie Liebich, finished third in the 4 by 800 m. Sophie's split of 2.05.09 was the fastest anchor split, with Foerster achieving the fastest overall split in 2.01.35.

On May 16, at Eugene, Oregon, Sophie qualified for the Big 10 1500 m final by winning her heat in 4.18.86. On May 18 at the same venue, she won the Big 10 1500 m final in 4.11.66, ahead of Silian Ayyildiz of Oregon (4.13.35) and Mia Barnett of Oregeon (4.13.40).

On May 29, at the West Region NCCA Qualifiers at E.B. Cushing Stadium in College Station, Texas, Sophie won her 1500 metres first round heat in 4.13.81 - the fastest of all qualifiers for the quarter finals. On May 31, at the same venue, Sophie qualified for the NCCA track and field championship at Eugene, Oregon (June 11–14) by winning her quarter-final heat in the 1500 m in 4.08.21. This is the third consecutive year in which Sophie has qualified for the NCCA championship at 1500 m.

On June 12, Athletics Ireland announced that Sophie would compete in the 800 metres at the European Athletics Team Championships 2nd Division in Slovenia on June 28–29.

Also on June 12, Sophie won her 1500 m semi final at the NCCA National Division 1 Championships at Eugene in 4.09.39, thereby qualifying automatically for the final on June 14. It will be O'Sullivan's third consecutive outdoor final. On June 14, Sophie won the 1500 m final in 4.07.94, ahead of Margot Appleton of Virginia (4.08.99) and Maggi Congdon of Northern Arizona (4.09.31). This helped Washington Huskies to a fourth place overall in the team rankings in what was O'Sullivan's final collegiate meet. Sophie followed in her mother Sonia's footsteps, as Sonia won the NCCA 3000 metres outdoors in both 1990 and 1991, representing Villanova.

On June 29, Sophie finished eight in the 800 metres heat and 16th overall at the European Athletics Team Championships Division Two at Atletski Stadion Poljane, Maribor (SLO), in 2.12.87. The heat and overall winner was Caroline Bredlinger of Austria in 1.58.95. At the Grand Prix Bresica in Bresica, Italy on July 15, Sophie finished in fifth place over 1500 m in 4.10.76, with Gaia Sabbatini of Italy taking the win in 4.07.41. On September 2nd, O'Sullivan finished in 9th place over 800 metres at the Trier eifel Flutichtmeeting in Germany in 2.11.77.

On September 13, at the World Championships in Tokyo, Sophie qualified in sixth place in her heat for the semi-finals of the 1500m in 4.02.12, her fastest time so far in 2025. On September 14, Sophie finished in 12th position in the semi-final in 4.18.18. Her race was won by Keynian Faith Kipyegon in 4.00.34.

=== 2026 ===
Sophie opened her 2026 season on March 28th, when she finished 10th over 1500 metres in 4.19.82 at the Maurie Plant Continental Tour Gold Meet at Lakeside Stadium in Melbourne, Australia, with Claudia Hollingsworth of Australia winning in 4.01.30, ahead of Georgia Hunter Bell (Great Britain) in 4.01.52, and Sarah Billings of Australia in 4.03.67.

On May 17th, Sophie finished fifth in the Seiko Golden Grand Prix in Tokyo over 1500 m in 4.18.2, in a race won by Purkty Chepkirui of Kenya in 4.16.11.

On May 29th, Sophie finished eighth over 800m in Bergen metres at the Trond Mohn Gam, Norway in 2.11.55. Still in Norway, she finished 2nd over 1500 metres in Jessen on June 5th in 4.12.77, just behind the UK's Molly Hudson in 4.12.68.

At the Cork City Sports on July 8th, Sophie finished third over 800 metres in 2.01.33, with the winner Nina Voukovic of Croatia clocking 2.00.41. At the Morton Games in Dublin on July 10th, Sophie won the 1500 metres in 4.08.26, suggesting a return to form.

At the Athletics Ireland National Track and Field Championships at Morton Stadium, Santry on July 25th, Sophie won her heat over 1500 metres in 4.22.54. On July 26th, Sophie regained the 1500m title she last held two years ago, winning in 4.05.62. This was faster than the previous championship best achieved by her mother, Sonia, in 4.07.09 back in 1995.

On August 9th, at the Mo Farah Athletics Track in Twickenham, England, Sophie won the women's 800 metres A race in 1.59.65. Only two other Irish women have dipped under the two minute mark - Ciara Mageean (1.58.51 in 2024) and Louise Shanahan (1.59.42 in 2022).

On August 15th, Sophie finished 5th in the second semi-final of the 1500 metres at the European Championshps at Alexander Stadium in Birmingham in 4.08.88, thereby qualifying for the final. On August 16, Sophie finished in 8th position in the 1500 final in 4.11.72, with Georgina Hunter Bell of Great Britain taking gold in 4.07.78. Ireland's Sarah Healy finished 5th in 4.10.76.

On August 27th, Sophie finished in 12th over 1500 metres at the Weltklasse Zurich in 4.12.25. On August 30th, she finished in 2nd place over 800 metres at the Grand Prix Bresica in Italy, in 1.58.60. The winner was Shafiqua Maloney of St. Vincent & the Grenadines in 1.58.03. Sophie's time moved her to second on the Irish all-time list, behind Ciara Mageean (1.58.51). On September 8th, Sophie finished in 11th place over 1500 metres in 4.06.80 at the 62nd Palio Città della Quercia meet in Rovereto, Italy. At the Athlos meet in the StoneX Stadium in North London on September 19, Sophie finished in 5th over 800m in 2.00.53, earning $10,000 in a race won by Keeley Hodginson (GBR) in 1.56.40.
