= Salomé Afonso =

Portuguese middle-distance runner

- At the 2026 Weltklasse Zürich

Personal information
- Full name: Salomé Paulo Afonso Afonso
- Nationality: Portuguese
- Born: 19 November 1997 (age 28) Lisbon, Portugal
- Height: 1.62 m (5 ft 4 in)

Sport
- Country: Portugal
- Sport: Athletics
- Event: 1500 metres
- Club: S.L. Benfica

Achievements and titles
- Personal bests: Outdoor; 1500 m: 3:59.32 (2025); 3000 m: 8:39.31 (2025); Indoor; 1500 m: 4:01.98 (2026) nacional record; 3000 m: 8:39.25 (2025)
Medal record
Women's athletics
Representing Portugal
European Indoor Championships
Silver medal – second place	2025 Apeldoorn	1500 m
Bronze medal – third place	2025 Apeldoorn	3000 m
European Cross Country Championships
Silver medal – second place	2025 Lagoa	Mixed relay
European Champion Clubs Cup Cross Country
Gold medal – first place	2025 Albufeira	Mixed relay
Gold medal – first place	2026 Albufeira	Mixed relay

Salomé Paulo Afonso Afonso (born 19 November 1997) is a Portuguese athlete. She competed in the women's 1500 metres event at the 2020 Summer Olympics.
