= 2026 World Athletics Ultimate Championship – Women's 1500 metres =

Women's 1500 metres at the 2026 World Athletics Ultimate Championship
- Venue: National Athletics Centre
- Location: Budapest, Hungary
- Dates: 12 September 2026 (final)
- Competitors: 12 from 7 nations
- Winning time: 3:57.55 min

Champion
- Klaudia Kazimierska; Poland

The women's 1500 metres was held as a straight final at the 2026 World Athletics Ultimate Championship at the National Athletics Centre in Budapest, Hungary on 12 September 2026. It was the first time the World Ultimate Championship was held. Athletes qualified by wildcard or by their world ranking.

== Background ==
Global records before the 2026 World Athletics Ultimate Championship
Record	Time	Athlete (nation)	Location	Date
World record	3:48.68	Faith Kipyegon (KEN)	Eugene, United States	5 July 2025
World lead	3:54.05	Klaudia Kazimierska (POL)	Brussels, Belgium	5 September 2026

Area records before the 2026 World Athletics Ultimate Championship
Record	Time	Athlete (nation)	Location	Date
African record	3:48.68	Faith Kipyegon (KEN)	Eugene, United States	5 July 2025
Asian record	3:50.46	Qu Yunxia (CHN)	Beijing, China	11 September 1993
European record	3:51.95	Sifan Hassan (NED)	Doha, Qatar	5 October 2019
North, Central American, and Caribbean record	3:54.99	Shelby Houlihan (USA)	Doha, Qatar	5 October 2019
Oceanian record	3:50.83	Jessica Hull (AUS)	Paris, France	7 July 2024
South American record	4:05.50	Micaela Levaggi (ARG)	Ordizia, Spain	4 July 2026

== Qualification ==
For the 1500 metres, twelve athletes qualified, up to three by wildcard for winners of the event at the 2024 Summer Olympic, the 2025 World Athletics Championships, or the 2026 Diamond League final and the others by their position at the World Athletics Rankings for the event on 3 September 2026.

== Results ==
=== Final ===
The final was held on 12 September at 19:36 (UTC+2).

Place	Athlete	Nation	Time	Notes
1st place, gold medalist(s)	Klaudia Kazimierska	Poland	3:57.55	
2	Georgia Hunter Bell	Great Britain	3:57.72	
3	Nikki Hiltz	United States	3:58.16	
4	Freweyni Hailu	Ethiopia	3:58.44	
5	Dorcus Ewoi	Kenya	3:58.55	
6	Abbey Caldwell	Australia	3:58.64	
7	Emily Mackay	United States	3:59.16	
8	Agathe Guillemot	France	3:59.40	
9	Jessica Hull	Australia	3:59.97	
10	Saron Berhe	Ethiopia	4:00.28	SB
11	Birke Haylom	Ethiopia	4:03.75	
12	Haregeweyni Kalayu	Ethiopia	4:06.14	
