= 2026 Memorial Van Damme =

Athletics meeting in Brussels, Belgium

- Dates: 4–5 September
- Host city: Brussels, Belgium
- Venue: King Baudouin Stadium
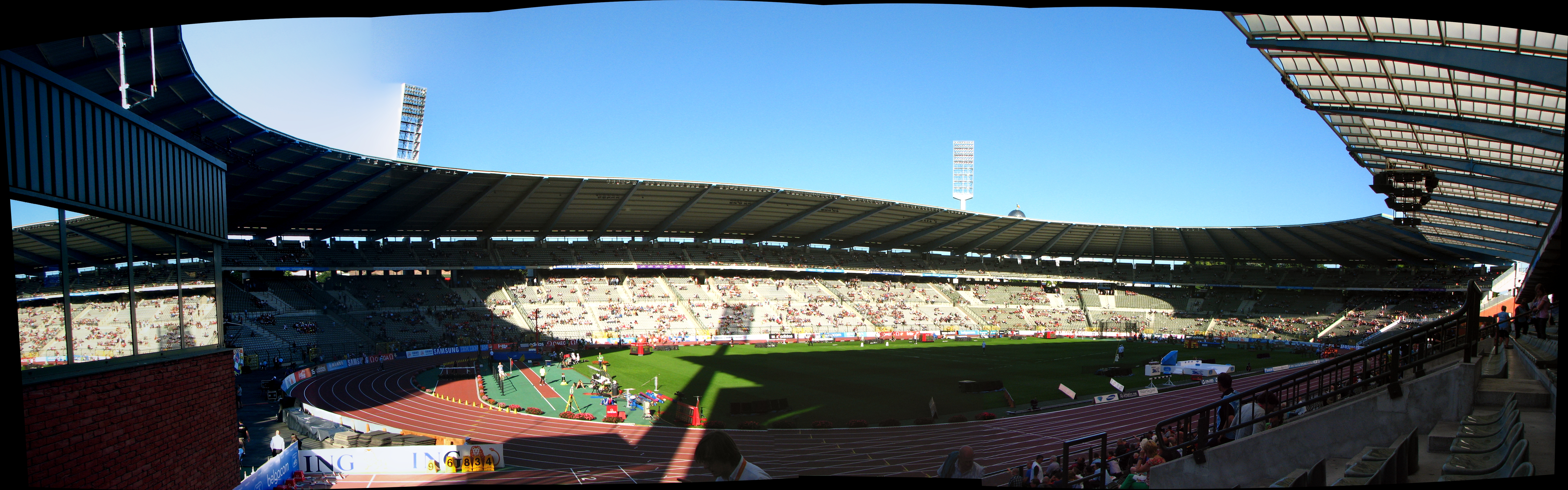
- Level: 2026 Diamond League

The 2026 Memorial Van Damme was the 50th edition of the annual outdoor track and field meeting in Brussels, Belgium. Held on 4 and 5 September, it was the fifteenth leg and served as the finals of the 2026 Diamond League – the highest-level international track and field circuit.

== Diamond+ events results ==
=== Men ===
100 Metres
| Place | Athlete | Nation | Time | Notes |
|---|---|---|---|---|
| 1st place, gold medalist(s) | Oblique Seville | Jamaica | 9.90 | |
| 2nd place, silver medalist(s) | Emmanuel Eseme | Cameroon | 9.93 | |
| 3rd place, bronze medalist(s) | Kanyinsola Ajayi | Nigeria | 9.97 | |
| 4 | Lachlan Kennedy | Australia | 9.99 | |
| 5 | Gift Leotlela | South Africa | 10.01 [.004] | |
| 6 | Christian Coleman | United States | 10.01 [.007] | |
| 7 | Akani Simbine | South Africa | 10.03 | |
| 8 | Trayvon Bromell | United States | 10.07 | |
| 9 | Simon Verherstraeten | Belgium | 10.28 | |
| | | | Wind: (+0.1 m/s) | |

800 Metres
| Place | Athlete | Nation | Time | Notes |
|---|---|---|---|---|
| 1st place, gold medalist(s) | Emmanuel Wanyonyi | Kenya | 1:41.80 | MR |
| 2nd place, silver medalist(s) | Djamel Sedjati | Algeria | 1:42.71 | |
| 3rd place, bronze medalist(s) | Yanis Meziane | France | 1:42.87 | |
| 4 | Marco Arop | Canada | 1:43.50 | |
| 5 | Ben Pattison | Great Britain | 1:44.29 | |
| 6 | Gabriel Tual | France | 1:44.55 | |
| 7 | Tobias Grønstad | Norway | 1:44.86 | |
| 8 | Slimane Moula | Algeria | 1:49.62 | |
| — | Jan Vukovič | Slovenia | DNF | PM |

1500 Metres
| Place | Athlete | Nation | Time | Notes |
|---|---|---|---|---|
| 1st place, gold medalist(s) | Cameron Myers | Australia | 3:30.14 | |
| 2nd place, silver medalist(s) | Phanuel Koech | Kenya | 3:30.18 | SB |
| 3rd place, bronze medalist(s) | Ethan Strand | United States | 3:30.50 | SB |
| 4 | Jakob Ingebrigtsen | Norway | 3:30.52 | SB |
| 5 | Yared Nuguse | United States | 3:30.56 | |
| 6 | Hobbs Kessler | United States | 3:30.71 | SB |
| 7 | Cole Hocker | United States | 3:30.80 | =SB |
| 8 | Jake Heyward | Great Britain | 3:31.18 | SB |
| 9 | Robert Farken | Germany | 3:32.11 | |
| 10 | Ruben Verheyden | Belgium | 3:32.47 | |
| 11 | Vincent Ciattei | United States | 3:33.67 | |
| 12 | Timothy Cheruiyot | Kenya | 3:35.20 | |
| — | Boaz Kiprugut | Kenya | DNF | PM |
| — | Christian Jackson | United States | DNF | PM |

Javelin throw
| Place | Athlete | Nation | Distance | Notes |
|---|---|---|---|---|
| 1st place, gold medalist(s) | Rumesh Tharanga | Sri Lanka | 89.04 m | |
| 2nd place, silver medalist(s) | Dawid Wegner | Poland | 87.47 m | PB |
| 3rd place, bronze medalist(s) | Keshorn Walcott | Trinidad and Tobago | 83.99 m | SB |
| 4 | Anderson Peters | Grenada | 83.70 m | |
| 5 | Julius Yego | Kenya | 76.79 m | |
| 6 | Timothy Herman | Belgium | 71.79 m | |
| 7 | Curtis Thompson | United States | 69.52 m | |

=== Women ===
800 Metres
| Place | Athlete | Nation | Time | Notes |
|---|---|---|---|---|
| 1st place, gold medalist(s) | Audrey Werro | Switzerland | 1:54.75 | MR |
| 2nd place, silver medalist(s) | Femke Broeders-Bol | Netherlands | 1:54.81 | |
| 3rd place, bronze medalist(s) | Saida Tsehaye | Ethiopia | 1:57.57 | |
| 4 | Veronica Vancardo | Switzerland | 1:58.66 | |
| 5 | Oratile Nowe | Botswana | 1:59.75 | |
| 6 | Sarah Billings | Australia | 1:59.99 | |
| 7 | Addison Wiley | United States | 2:01.29 | |
| 8 | Camille Laus | Belgium | 2:01.63 | |
| 9 | Prudence Sekgodiso | South Africa | 2:02.34 | |
| — | Rachel Klopfenstein | Mauritius | DNF | PM |

1500 Metres
| Place | Athlete | Nation | Time | Notes |
|---|---|---|---|---|
| 1st place, gold medalist(s) | Klaudia Kazimierska | Poland | 3:54.05 | MR, NR, WL |
| 2nd place, silver medalist(s) | Dorcus Ewoi | Kenya | 3:54.72 | PB |
| 3rd place, bronze medalist(s) | Jessica Hull | Australia | 3:54.73 | SB |
| 4 | Georgia Hunter Bell | Great Britain | 3:56.40 | |
| 5 | Nikki Hiltz | United States | 3:56.87 | SB |
| 6 | Agathe Guillemot | France | 3:57.12 | |
| 7 | Abbey Caldwell | Australia | 3:57.19 | |
| 8 | Emily Mackay | United States | 3:57.98 | |
| 9 | Birke Haylom | Ethiopia | 4:02.79 | |
| — | Tsige Duguma | Ethiopia | DNF | |
| — | Lorea Ibarzabal | Spain | DNF | PM |
| — | Mariska Parewyck | Belgium | DNF | PM |

100 Metres hurdles
| Place | Athlete | Nation | Time | Notes |
|---|---|---|---|---|
| 1st place, gold medalist(s) | Masai Russell | United States | 12.20 | MR |
| 2nd place, silver medalist(s) | Devynne Charlton | Bahamas | 12.33 | NR |
| 3rd place, bronze medalist(s) | Megan Simmonds | Jamaica | 12.43 | SB |
| 4 | Tobi Amusan | Nigeria | 12.54 [.532] | |
| 5 | Nadine Visser | Netherlands | 12.54 [.539] | |
| 6 | Pia Skrzyszowska | Poland | 12.64 | |
| 7 | Alaysha Johnson | United States | 12.66 | |
| 8 | Yanla Ndjip-Nyemeck | Belgium | 12.93 | |
| | | | Wind: (+1.0 m/s) | |

Long jump
| Place | Athlete | Nation | Distance | Notes |
|---|---|---|---|---|
| 1st place, gold medalist(s) | Monae' Nichols | United States | 6.91 m (+0.1 m/s) | |
| 2nd place, silver medalist(s) | Larissa Iapichino | Italy | 6.86 m (+0.1 m/s) | |
| 3rd place, bronze medalist(s) | Claire Bryant | United States | 6.83 m (−0.1 m/s) | |
| 4 | Alyssa Jones | United States | 6.80 m (+0.1 m/s) | |
| 5 | Hilary Kpatcha | France | 6.60 m (±0.0 m/s) | |
| 6 | Agate de Sousa | Portugal | 6.33 m (±0.0 m/s) | |
| 7 | Noor Vidts | Belgium | 6.23 m (±0.0 m/s) | SB |

== Diamond events results ==
=== Men ===
200 Metres
| Place | Athlete | Nation | Time | Notes |
|---|---|---|---|---|
| 1st place, gold medalist(s) | Kenny Bednarek | United States | 19.62 | =WL |
| 2nd place, silver medalist(s) | Sinesipho Dambile | South Africa | 19.89 | |
| 3rd place, bronze medalist(s) | Makanakaishe Charamba | Zimbabwe | 19.99 | |
| 4 | Letsile Tebogo | Botswana | 20.01 | |
| 5 | Courtney Lindsey | United States | 20.09 | =SB |
| 6 | José Figueroa | Puerto Rico | 20.44 | |
| 7 | Timothé Mumenthaler | Switzerland | 20.52 | |
| 8 | Reynier Mena | Cuba | 20.90 | |
| | | | Wind: (+0.9 m/s) | |

400 Metres
| Place | Athlete | Nation | Time | Notes |
|---|---|---|---|---|
| 1st place, gold medalist(s) | Collen Kebinatshipi | Botswana | 43.40 | DLR, NR |
| 2nd place, silver medalist(s) | Jereem Richards | Trinidad and Tobago | 43.68 | NR |
| 3rd place, bronze medalist(s) | Jacory Patterson | United States | 43.78 | PB |
| 4 | Christopher Bailey | United States | 43.97 | PB |
| 5 | Matthew Hudson-Smith | Great Britain | 44.23 | |
| 6 | Zakithi Nene | South Africa | 44.44 | |
| 7 | Daniel Segers | Belgium | 44.82 | |
| 8 | Khaleb McRae | United States | 45.53 | |

5000 Metres
| Place | Athlete | Nation | Time | Notes |
|---|---|---|---|---|
| 1st place, gold medalist(s) | Birhanu Balew | Bahrain | 12:45.70 | AR, WL |
| 2nd place, silver medalist(s) | Egide Ntakarutimana | Burundi | 12:46.73 | NR |
| 3rd place, bronze medalist(s) | Cornelius Kemboi | Kenya | 12:47.29 | PB |
| 4 | Biniam Mehary | Ethiopia | 12:47.78 | SB |
| 5 | Graham Blanks | United States | 12:47.98 | PB |
| 6 | Nico Young | United States | 12:48.12 | SB |
| 7 | Jacob Krop | Kenya | 12:51.23 | SB |
| 8 | Dominic Lokinyomo Lobalu | Switzerland | 12:56.07 | |
| 9 | Grant Fisher | United States | 12:59.10 | |
| 10 | Reynold Cheruiyot | Kenya | 13:22.24 | |
| — | Tshepo Tshite | South Africa | DNF | PM |
| — | Mounir Akbache | France | DNF | PM |

110 Metres hurdles
| Place | Athlete | Nation | Time | Notes |
|---|---|---|---|---|
| 1st place, gold medalist(s) | Ja'Kobe Tharp | United States | 13.03 | |
| 2nd place, silver medalist(s) | Jamal Britt | United States | 13.09 | |
| 3rd place, bronze medalist(s) | Trey Cunningham | United States | 13.22 | |
| 4 | Kendry Menéndez | Cuba | 13.32 | |
| 5 | Elie Bacari | Belgium | 13.42 | |
| 6 | Orlando Bennett | Jamaica | 13.43 | |
| 7 | Rachid Muratake | Japan | 13.53 | |
| 8 | Cordell Tinch | United States | DQ | |
| | | | Wind: (−0.2 m/s) | |

400 Metres hurdles
| Place | Athlete | Nation | Time | Notes |
|---|---|---|---|---|
| 1st place, gold medalist(s) | Alison dos Santos | Brazil | 46.70 | MR |
| 2nd place, silver medalist(s) | Trevor Bassitt | United States | 48.03 | |
| 3rd place, bronze medalist(s) | Matheus Lima | Brazil | 48.18 [.171] | |
| 4 | Emil Agyekum | Germany | 48.18 [.174] | |
| 5 | Caleb Dean | United States | 48.20 | |
| 6 | Abderrahman Samba | Qatar | 48.24 | |
| 7 | Matic Ian Guček | Slovenia | 48.33 | |
| 8 | Ezekiel Nathaniel | Nigeria | 48.37 | |

3000 Metres steeplechase
| Place | Athlete | Nation | Time | Notes |
|---|---|---|---|---|
| 1st place, gold medalist(s) | Gemechu Godana | Ethiopia | 8:08.67 | |
| 2nd place, silver medalist(s) | Soufiane El Bakkali | Morocco | 8:10.03 | |
| 3rd place, bronze medalist(s) | Simon Koech | Kenya | 8:11.15 | |
| 4 | Ruben Querinjean | Luxembourg | 8:11.97 | |
| 5 | Daniel Arce | Spain | 8:14.03 | |
| 6 | Edmund Serem | Kenya | 8:15.26 | |
| 7 | Samuel Firewu | Ethiopia | 8:16.51 | |
| 8 | Ryuji Miura | Japan | 8:17.31 | |
| 9 | Karl Bebendorf | Germany | 8:18.63 | |
| 10 | Matthew Wilkinson | United States | 8:19.04 | |
| 11 | Rémi Schyns | Belgium | 8:21.53 | |
| — | Salaheddine Ben Yazide | Morocco | DNF | |
| — | Wilberforce Chemiat Kones | Kenya | DNF | PM |

High jump
| Place | Athlete | Nation | Height | Notes |
|---|---|---|---|---|
| 1st place, gold medalist(s) | Mateusz Kołodziejski | Poland | 2.28 m | |
| 2nd place, silver medalist(s) | JuVaughn Harrison | United States | 2.28 m | |
| 3rd place, bronze medalist(s) | Oleh Doroshchuk | Ukraine | 2.25 m | |
| 3rd place, bronze medalist(s) | Gianmarco Tamberi | Italy | 2.25 m | |
| 5 | Romaine Beckford | Jamaica | 2.21 m | |
| 6 | Erick Portillo | Mexico | 2.21 m | |
| 7 | Thomas Carmoy | Belgium | 2.16 m | |

Pole vault
| Place | Athlete | Nation | Height | Notes |
|---|---|---|---|---|
| 1st place, gold medalist(s) | Emmanouil Karalis | Greece | 6.12 m | MR |
| 2nd place, silver medalist(s) | Sondre Guttormsen | Norway | 5.82 m | |
| 3rd place, bronze medalist(s) | Kurtis Marschall | Australia | 5.82 m | |
| 4 | Sam Kendricks | United States | 5.72 m | |
| 5 | Baptiste Thiery | France | 5.72 m | |
| 6 | Ben Broeders | Belgium | 5.52 m | |
| – | Armand Duplantis | Sweden | DNS | |

Long jump
| Place | Athlete | Nation | Distance | Notes |
|---|---|---|---|---|
| 1st place, gold medalist(s) | Tajay Gayle | Jamaica | 8.46 m (+1.4 m/s) | SB |
| 2nd place, silver medalist(s) | Miltiadis Tentoglou | Greece | 8.40 m (+0.5 m/s) | |
| 3rd place, bronze medalist(s) | Simon Ehammer | Switzerland | 8.23 m (−0.2 m/s) | |
| 4 | Bozhidar Sarâboyukov | Bulgaria | 8.00 m (−0.2 m/s) | |
| 5 | Wayne Pinnock | Jamaica | 7.94 m (+1.0 m/s) | |
| 6 | Yanni Sampson | Belgium | 7.82 m (+1.7 m/s) | |
| 7 | Jorge A. Hodelín | Cuba | 6.81 m (+0.8 m/s) | |

Triple jump
| Place | Athlete | Nation | Distance | Notes |
|---|---|---|---|---|
| 1st place, gold medalist(s) | Andy Díaz | Italy | 17.74 m (−0.6 m/s) | MR |
| 2nd place, silver medalist(s) | Pedro Pichardo | Portugal | 17.51 m (±0.0 m/s) | |
| 3rd place, bronze medalist(s) | Jordan Scott | Jamaica | 17.18 m (+0.2 m/s) | |
| 4 | Yasser Triki | Algeria | 16.96 m (−0.1 m/s) | |
| 5 | Almir dos Santos | Brazil | 16.42 m (−0.1 m/s) | |
| — | Lázaro Martínez | Cuba | NM | |

Shot put
| Place | Athlete | Nation | Distance | Notes |
|---|---|---|---|---|
| 1st place, gold medalist(s) | Rajindra Campbell | Jamaica | 23.08 m | MR, NR, WL |
| 2nd place, silver medalist(s) | Jordan Geist | United States | 22.23 m | |
| 3rd place, bronze medalist(s) | Joe Kovacs | United States | 22.09 m | |
| 4 | Leonardo Fabbri | Italy | 22.03 m | |
| 5 | Roger Steen | United States | 21.73 m | |
| 6 | Tom Walsh | New Zealand | 21.67 m | |

Discus throw
| Place | Athlete | Nation | Distance | Notes |
|---|---|---|---|---|
| 1st place, gold medalist(s) | Kristjan Čeh | Slovenia | 71.29 m | MR |
| 2nd place, silver medalist(s) | Mykolas Alekna | Lithuania | 70.14 m | |
| 3rd place, bronze medalist(s) | Roje Stona | Jamaica | 68.86 m | |
| 4 | Matthew Denny | Australia | 68.04 m | |
| 5 | Daniel Ståhl | Sweden | 67.92 m | |
| 6 | Henrik Janssen | Germany | 66.30 m | |

=== Women ===
100 Metres
| Place | Athlete | Nation | Time | Notes |
|---|---|---|---|---|
| 1st place, gold medalist(s) | Tina Clayton | Jamaica | 10.93 | |
| 2nd place, silver medalist(s) | Amy Hunt | Great Britain | 11.06 | |
| 3rd place, bronze medalist(s) | Sha'Carri Richardson | United States | 11.07 | |
| 4 | Patrizia van der Weken | Luxembourg | 11.08 [.075] | |
| 5 | Jonielle Smith | Jamaica | 11.08 [.078] | |
| 6 | Zoe Hobbs | New Zealand | 11.14 | |
| 7 | Zaynab Dosso | Italy | 11.26 [.255] | |
| 8 | Boglárka Takács | Hungary | 11.26 [.260] | |
| 9 | Delphine Nkansa | Belgium | 11.29 | |
| | | | Wind: (+0.3 m/s) | |

200 Metres
| Place | Athlete | Nation | Time | Notes |
|---|---|---|---|---|
| 1st place, gold medalist(s) | Julien Alfred | Saint Lucia | 21.79 | |
| 2nd place, silver medalist(s) | Kayla White | United States | 22.00 | |
| 3rd place, bronze medalist(s) | Amy Hunt | Great Britain | 22.16 | SB |
| 4 | Anavia Battle | United States | 22.44 | |
| 5 | Cambrea Sturgis | United States | 22.65 | |
| 6 | Audrey Leduc | Canada | 22.95 | |
| 7 | Success Eduan | Great Britain | 23.06 | |
| 8 | Jenna Prandini | United States | 23.14 | |
| | | | Wind: (+0.1 m/s) | |

400 Metres
| Place | Athlete | Nation | Time | Notes |
|---|---|---|---|---|
| 1st place, gold medalist(s) | Marileidy Paulino | Dominican Republic | 48.64 | MR |
| 2nd place, silver medalist(s) | Henriette Jæger | Norway | 49.20 | |
| 3rd place, bronze medalist(s) | Nickisha Pryce | Jamaica | 49.36 | |
| 4 | Aaliyah Butler | United States | 49.98 | |
| 5 | Lurdes Gloria Manuel | Czech Republic | 50.18 | |
| 6 | Roxana Gómez | Cuba | 50.88 | |
| 7 | Natalia Bukowiecka | Poland | 51.33 | |
| 8 | Helena Ponette | Belgium | 51.41 | |

5000 Metres
| Place | Athlete | Nation | Time | Notes |
|---|---|---|---|---|
| 1st place, gold medalist(s) | Freweyni Hailu | Ethiopia | 14:35.20 | |
| 2nd place, silver medalist(s) | Likina Amebaw | Ethiopia | 14:36.31 | |
| 3rd place, bronze medalist(s) | Senayet Getachew | Ethiopia | 14:37.09 | |
| 4 | Rose Davies | Australia | 14:37.47 | SB |
| 5 | Hirut Meshesha | Ethiopia | 14:37.84 | |
| 6 | Georgia Griffith | Australia | 14:38.69 | SB |
| 7 | Maureen Koster | Netherlands | 14:39.38 | |
| 8 | Medina Eisa | Ethiopia | 14:39.40 | |
| 9 | Marta Alemayo | Ethiopia | 14:40.27 | |
| 10 | Linden Hall | Australia | 14:40.62 | PB |
| — | Jana van Lent | Belgium | DNF | |
| — | Francine Niyomukunzi | Burundi | DNF | PM |

400 Metres hurdles
| Place | Athlete | Nation | Time | Notes |
|---|---|---|---|---|
| 1st place, gold medalist(s) | Anna Cockrell | United States | 53.01 | |
| 2nd place, silver medalist(s) | Emma Zapletalová | Slovakia | 53.10 | |
| 3rd place, bronze medalist(s) | Paulien Couckuyt | Belgium | 53.20 | NR |
| 4 | Gianna Woodruff | Panama | 53.56 | SB |
| 5 | Rushell Clayton | Jamaica | 53.85 | |
| 6 | Fatoumata Binta Diallo | Portugal | 53.90 | |
| 7 | Dalilah Muhammad | United States | 54.13 | |
| 8 | Amalie Iuel | Norway | 54.90 | |

3000 Metres steeplechase
| Place | Athlete | Nation | Time | Notes |
|---|---|---|---|---|
| 1st place, gold medalist(s) | Faith Cherotich | Kenya | 8:51.61 | MR |
| 2nd place, silver medalist(s) | Doris Lemngole | Kenya | 8:52.86 | PB |
| 3rd place, bronze medalist(s) | Winfred Yavi | Bahrain | 8:53.54 | |
| 4 | Marwa Bouzayani | Tunisia | 8:57.02 | |
| 5 | Peruth Chemutai | Uganda | 8:59.77 | |
| 6 | Lexy Halladay-Lowry | United States | 9:05.36 | PB |
| 7 | Kena Tufa | Ethiopia | 9:12.34 | |
| 8 | Gabrielle Jennings | United States | 9:14.05 | |
| 9 | Lea Meyer | Germany | 9:22.91 | |
| 10 | Elise Thorner | Great Britain | 9:34.68 | |
| — | Olivia Gürth | Germany | DNF | PM |

High jump
| Place | Athlete | Nation | Height | Notes |
|---|---|---|---|---|
| 1st place, gold medalist(s) | Eleanor Patterson | Australia | 2.01 m | |
| 2nd place, silver medalist(s) | Yaroslava Mahuchikh | Ukraine | 1.99 m | |
| 3rd place, bronze medalist(s) | Nicola Olyslagers | Australia | 1.95 m | |
| 4 | Angelina Topić | Serbia | 1.95 m | |
| 5 | Iryna Herashchenko | Ukraine | 1.88 m | |
| 6 | Lamara Distin | Jamaica | 1.88 m | |
| 7 | Merel Maes | Belgium | 1.84 m | |
| 8 | Nafissatou Thiam | Belgium | 1.84 m | =SB |

Pole vault
| Place | Athlete | Nation | Height | Notes |
|---|---|---|---|---|
| 1st place, gold medalist(s) | Hana Moll | United States | 4.91 m | PB |
| 2nd place, silver medalist(s) | Angelica Moser | Switzerland | 4.80 m | |
| 3rd place, bronze medalist(s) | Tina Šutej | Slovenia | 4.70 m | |
| 4 | Katie Moon | United States | 4.70 m | |
| 5 | Emily Grove | United States | 4.70 m | =SB |
| 6 | Imogen Ayris | New Zealand | 4.55 m | |
| 7 | Elien Vekemans | Belgium | 4.55 m | |

Triple jump
| Place | Athlete | Nation | Distance | Notes |
|---|---|---|---|---|
| 1st place, gold medalist(s) | Saly Sarr | Senegal | 14.96 m (+0.3 m/s) | |
| 2nd place, silver medalist(s) | Leyanis Pérez | Cuba | 14.82 m (+0.6 m/s) | |
| 3rd place, bronze medalist(s) | Davisleydi Velazco | Cuba | 14.73 m (+0.6 m/s) | |
| 4 | Ackelia Smith | Jamaica | 14.29 m (−0.2 m/s) | |
| 5 | Thea LaFond | Dominica | 14.13 m (−0.3 m/s) | |
| 6 | Liadagmis Povea | Cuba | 14.08 m (+0.6 m/s) | |
| 7 | Saliyya Guisse | Belgium | 13.33 m (+1.0 m/s) | |

Shot put
| Place | Athlete | Nation | Distance | Notes |
|---|---|---|---|---|
| 1st place, gold medalist(s) | Chase Jackson | United States | 21.14 m | DLR, AR, WL |
| 2nd place, silver medalist(s) | Sarah Mitton | Canada | 20.64 m | |
| 3rd place, bronze medalist(s) | Jessica Schilder | Netherlands | 20.57 m | |
| 4 | Yemisi Mabry | Germany | 19.59 m | |
| 5 | Fanny Roos | Sweden | 19.08 m | |
| 6 | Danniel Thomas-Dodd | Jamaica | 18.44 m | |

Discus throw
| Place | Athlete | Nation | Distance | Notes |
|---|---|---|---|---|
| 1st place, gold medalist(s) | Feng Bin | China | 67.46 m | SB |
| 2nd place, silver medalist(s) | Valarie Sion | United States | 66.92 m | |
| 3rd place, bronze medalist(s) | Jorinde van Klinken | Netherlands | 64.66 m | |
| 4 | Shanice Craft | Germany | 62.64 m | |
| 5 | Vanessa Kamga | Sweden | 62.53 m | |
| 6 | Cierra Jackson | United States | 61.93 m | |

Javelin throw
| Place | Athlete | Nation | Distance | Notes |
|---|---|---|---|---|
| 1st place, gold medalist(s) | Yan Ziyi | China | 68.42 m | MR |
| 2nd place, silver medalist(s) | Haruka Kitaguchi | Japan | 65.44 m | SB |
| 3rd place, bronze medalist(s) | Flor Ruiz | Colombia | 64.07 m | |
| 4 | Adriana Vilagoš | Serbia | 62.22 m | |
| 5 | Anete Sietina | Latvia | 59.26 m | |
| 6 | Sigrid Borge | Norway | 58.08 m | |

== Promotional events results ==
=== Men ===
400 Metres
| Place | Athlete | Nation | Time | Notes |
|---|---|---|---|---|
| 1st place, gold medalist(s) | Lee Eppie | Botswana | 44.50 | SB |
| 2nd place, silver medalist(s) | Muhammad Abdallah Kounta | France | 44.55 | |
| 3rd place, bronze medalist(s) | Attila Molnár | Hungary | 44.66 | |
| 4 | Jonathan Sacoor | Belgium | 44.85 | PB |
| 5 | Edoardo Scotti | Italy | 45.01 | |
| 6 | Dylan Borlée | Belgium | 45.20 | SB |
| 7 | Florent Mabille | Belgium | 46.12 | |
| 8 | Christian Iguacel | Belgium | 47.86 | |

=== Women ===
400 Metres
| Place | Athlete | Nation | Time | Notes |
|---|---|---|---|---|
| 1st place, gold medalist(s) | Lieke Klaver | Netherlands | 49.67 | |
| 2nd place, silver medalist(s) | Isabelle Black | France | 50.72 | |
| 3rd place, bronze medalist(s) | Myrte van der Schoot | Netherlands | 51.00 | |
| 4 | Paris Peoples | United States | 51.53 | |
| 5 | Kylie Lambert | Belgium | 53.08 | PB |
| 6 | Isalie Vandael | Belgium | 53.23 | PB |
| 7 | Justine Goossens | Belgium | 53.42 | PB |
| 8 | Messalina Pieroni | Belgium | 54.49 | |

== See also ==
- 2026 Diamond League
