= Nikki Hiltz =

American middle-distance runner (born 1994)

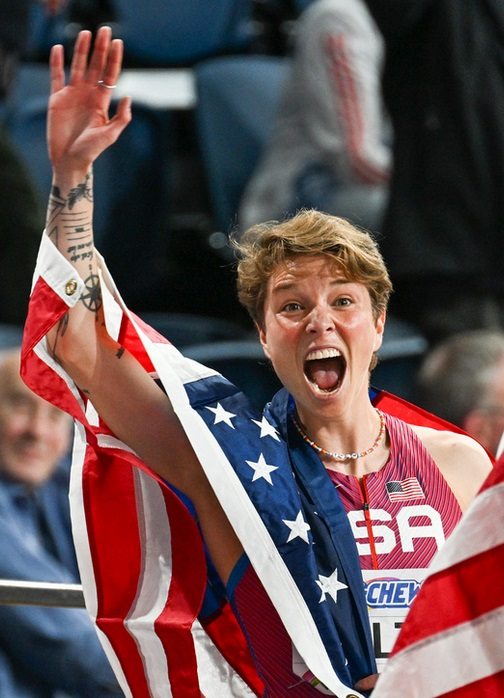
- Hiltz in 2024

Personal information
- Born: October 23, 1994 (age 32) Santa Cruz, California, U.S.
- Agent: Merhawi Keflezighi
- Height: 5 ft 4 in (1.63 m)

Sport
- Country: United States
- Sport: Track, middle-distance running
- Events: 1500 meters, mile
- College team: Arkansas Razorbacks (2015–18); Oregon Ducks (2014–15)
- Club: Adidas (2018–21); Lululemon (2021–present)
- Turned pro: 2018
- Coached by: Terrence Mahon (2018–20); Mac Fleet (2020–21); Mike Smith (2022–2025); Juli Benson (2025–present)

Achievements and titles
- Olympic finals: 2024; 1500 m, 7th
- World finals: 2025; 1500 m, 5th
- Highest world ranking: 3rd (1500 m)
- Personal bests: Outdoor; 800 meters: 1:58.23 (Kingston 2025); 1500 meters: 3:55.33 (Eugene 2024); Mile: 4:16.35 AR (Monaco 2023); Indoor; 1500 metres: 3:59.68 (Toruń 2026); Mile: 4:19.64 (New York City 2026); 3000 metres: 8:32.52 (Boston 2025); Two miles: 9:15.80 (New York City 2024)
Medal record
Women's athletics
Representing the United States
World Ultimate Championship
Third place	2026 Budapest	1500 m
World Indoor Championships
Silver medal – second place	2024 Glasgow	1500 m
Bronze medal – third place	2026 Toruń	1500 m
Pan American Games
Gold medal – first place	2019 Lima	1500 m

Nikki Hiltz (/ˈhɪlts/ HILTS; born October 23, 1994) is an American middle-distance runner specializing in the 1500 meters and mile. Hiltz holds the American record in the mile and as of 2025, has won eight consecutive US titles across the mile and 1500 m. Hiltz won a silver medal at the 2024 World Indoor Championships and a bronze medal at the 2026 World Indoor Championships.

Hiltz competed collegiately for the Oregon Ducks and Arkansas Razorbacks.

They came out as transgender and nonbinary on International Transgender Day of Visibility, March 31, 2021. Hiltz was assigned female at birth and has been competing in the women's category since childhood.

At the 2024 Paris Olympics, Hiltz finished seventh in the women's 1500 meter final. They are currently the second-fastest American of all-time in the women’s 1500 meter and mile events.

== Career ==
=== High school ===
While attending Aptos Middle School, Hiltz ran a 400 m in 1:07.41 (2009), an 800 m in 2:51.54 (2008), a high jump of 1.37 m (2009), and long jump of 3.94 m (2008). At Aptos High School, Hiltz won 6 California Interscholastic Federation (CIF) Central Coast Section titles.

In cross country, Hiltz finished fifth at the 2010 California state championships as a sophomore. Later that year, they qualified for Foot Locker Cross Country Nationals where they placed 17th.

On the track, Hiltz won a California state championship and three additional top-three finishes. As a sophomore, Hiltz finished third in the 1,600 meter race. During their junior year, in 2012, they won the California 1600 meter state title, running a high-school best 4:42.45. This was the third best time among US junior athletes in 2012. As a senior, Hiltz came back from injury to finish third in the 800 m and second in the 1500 meter race. Hiltz ran a high school best 800 meter race time of 2:09.50 at the 2013 California sectional meet.

During high school, Hiltz competed in the 1500 meter race at the USA Junior Track and Field Championships. In Eugene, Oregon in 2011, Hiltz finished in fourth place in a time of 4:26.13. In Bloomington, Indiana in 2012, they finished in sixth place in a time of 4:29.52.

==== High school personal bests ====
	Event	Time	Date	Location	Year
Outdoor	200 m	26.51	4 May 2013	Soquel, California	12th grade
Outdoor	400 m	57.11	27 April 2013	Aptos, California	12th grade
Outdoor	800 m	2:09.50	18–24 May 2013	Salinas, California	12th grade
Outdoor	1500 m	4:26.13	23 June 2011	Eugene, Oregon	10th grade
Outdoor	1600 m	4:42.45	2 June 2012	Clovis, California	11th grade
Outdoor	Mile	4:51.52	30 March 2013	Palo Alto, California	12th grade
Outdoor	3200 m	10:48.23	13 April 2013	Santa Cruz, California	12th grade
Outdoor	300 m hurdles	47.86	7 May 2011	Santa Cruz, California	10th grade

=== Collegiate ===
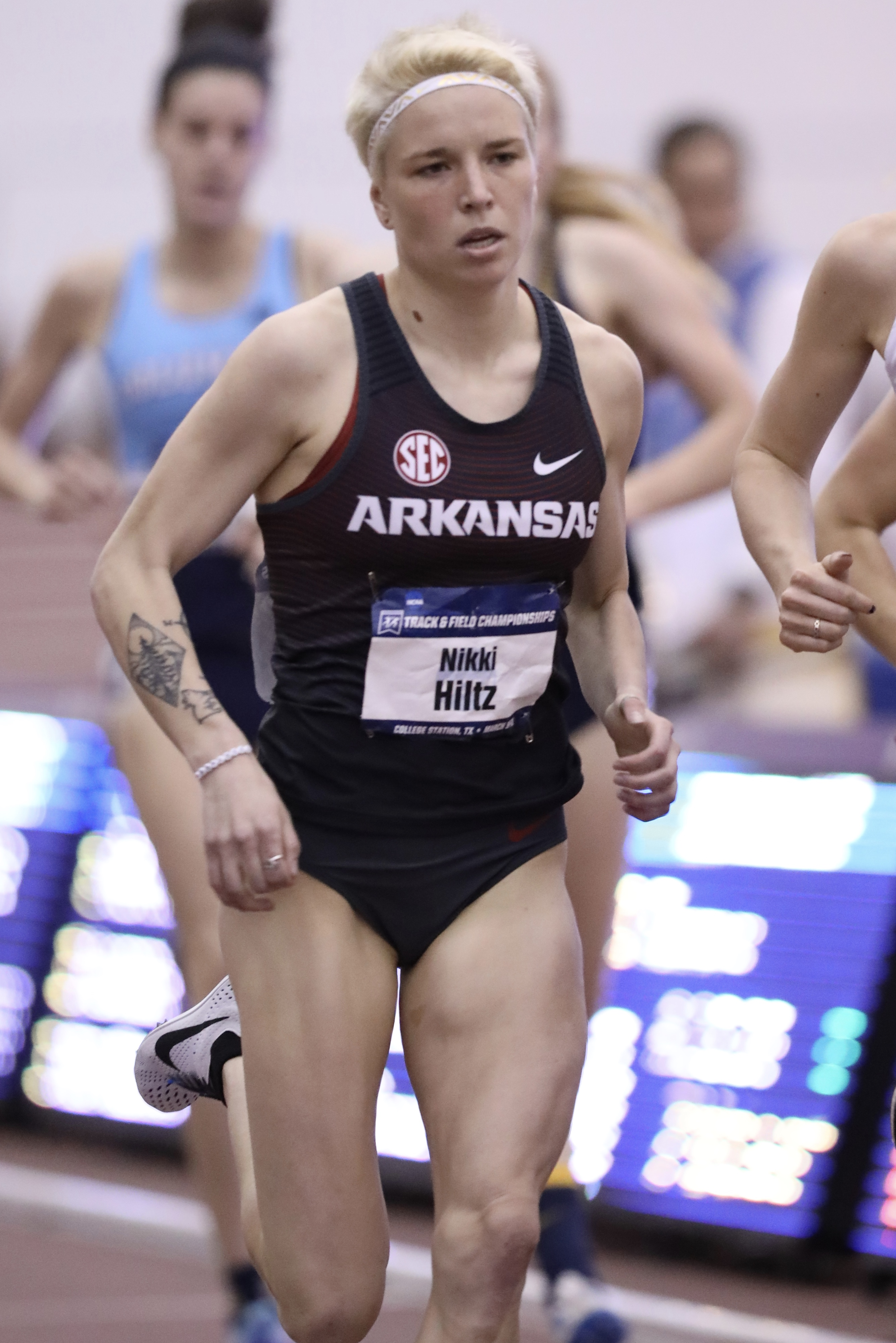
Hiltz competing for the Arkansas Razorbacks in 2018

Hiltz is a 6 time NCAA Division I All-American. Hiltz began a college career at Oregon in 2014 before transferring to Arkansas in 2016.

At the 2015 NCAA Division I Indoor Track and Field Championships Hiltz finished in 8th place with a time of 4:38.47 in the mile for the Oregon Ducks. Hiltz was a 2015 NCAA Division I & Pac-12 Conference Track and Field Team Champion as a member of the Oregon Ducks at the 2015 NCAA Division I Outdoor Track and Field Championships.

After the 2015 season, Hiltz transferred to Arkansas. In 2016 Hiltz, along with Arkansas Razorbacks teammates Daina Harper, Therese Haiss and Jessica Kamilos, placed 5th in the DMR (Distance Medley Relay) with a time of 10:59.22 at the 2016 NCAA Division I Indoor Track and Field Championships. Hiltz placed 6th in the mile, finishing with a time of 4:34.57 at the 2017 NCAA Division I Indoor Track and Field Championships. They finished 2nd in the 1500 m 2017 NCAA Division I Outdoor Track and Field Championships with a time of 4:13.80.

In 2018, Hiltz earned First Team NCAA Division I All-America honors in the 1500 m Outdoors at the 2018 NCAA Division I Outdoor Track and Field Championships for the Arkansas Razorbacks. Hiltz also placed 3rd in the mile at the 2018 NCAA Division I Indoor Track and Field Championships.

==== University personal bests ====
	Event	Time	Date	Location	Year
Outdoor	800 m	2:05.83	11–13 May 2017	Columbia, South Carolina	JR-3 Arkansas
Outdoor	1500 m	4:09.40	6–9 June 2018	Eugene, Oregon	SR-4 Arkansas
Indoor	800 m	2:05.16	27 January 2018	Fayetteville, Arkansas	SR-4 Arkansas
Indoor	1000 m	2:45.94	15 January 2016	Fayetteville, Arkansas	SO-2 Arkansas
Indoor	1500 m	4:15.40	3 February 2018	New York City, New York	SR-4 Arkansas
Indoor	Mile	4:32.59	9–10 March 2018	College Station, Texas	SR-4 Arkansas
Indoor	3000 m	9:04.64	9–10 February 2018	Seattle, Washington	SR-4 Arkansas
XC	3.1 miles	16:41.9	1 October 2016	Fayetteville, Arkansas	JR-3 Arkansas
XC	5 km	16:55.1	29 September 2017	Notre Dame, Indiana	SR-4 Arkansas
XC	6km	19:35.5	10 November 2017	College Station, Texas	SR-4 Arkansas

=== Professional ===
==== 2018 ====
In 2018, Hiltz signed with Adidas and trained with California-based The Mission Athletics Club, now known as The Golden Coast Track Club, after running a 1500 m time ranked in the top 100 in the world. In January of the same year they ran a then-personal best 2:05.16 in the 800 m. Later in the year Hiltz ran the Aetna Falmouth Mile placing 4th in 4:32.29. They followed up with a 5th-place finish at the Memphis Ed Murphey Mile with a time of 4:32.59. They also ran the Bay Shore Hoka One Long Island Mile, placing 12th in 4:39.23. Hiltz ranked 92nd in the world in the 1500 m with a personal best of 4:09.14.

==== 2019 ====
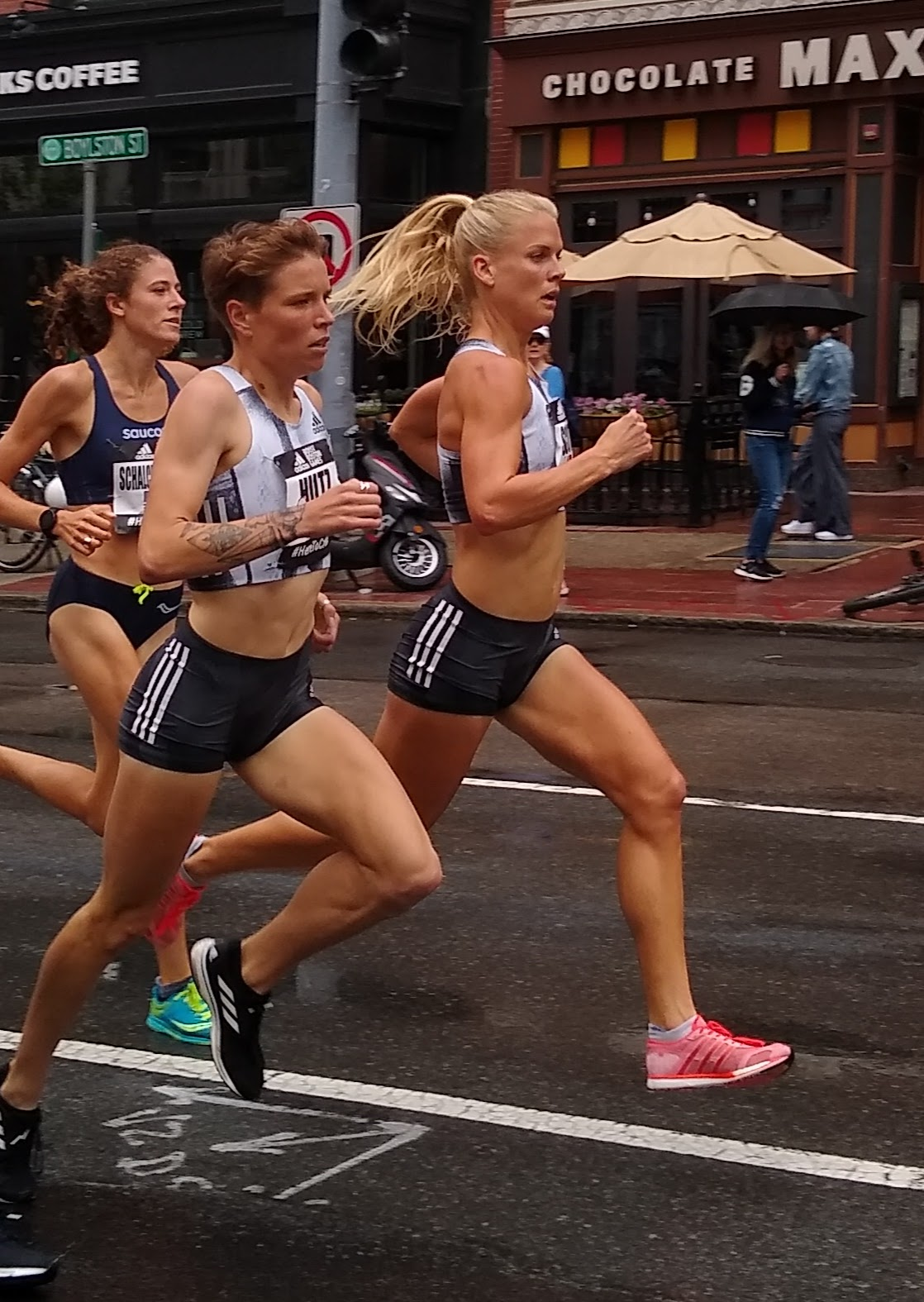
Nikki Hiltz (left) and Dominique Scott (right) running the Back Bay Mile at the Adidas Boost Boston Games in 2019.

Hiltz ran an indoor 3000 m (9:04.32) at the JDL Fast Track Invitational, won the indoor mile (4:31.42) at the Husky Classic, and at the 2019 USA Track & Field Indoor Championships placed 5th in the mile (4:32.40) and 15th in the 2 mile (9:55.50). Later that year, Hiltz won the 800 m (2:01.37) at the 2019 Bryan Clay Invitational, won the 1500 m (4:07.71) at the 2019 USATF Distance Classic, runner-up in the 1500 m (4:05.56) at 2019 Portland Track Festival, won the 800 m (2:02.93) at the 2019 Adrian Martinez Classic, won the 1500 m (4:05.97) at the 2019 Sunset Tour. They also placed 3rd in the 1500 m (4:03.55) at the 2019 USA Outdoor Track and Field Championships. Hiltz ranked 19th in the world in the 1500 m with a personal best of 4:01.52 in the semi-finals of the 2019 World Athletics Championships.

==== 2020 ====
Hiltz ran the mile at the Millrose Games in 4:24.45, splitting a 1500 m time of 4:07.09 and placing 5th with an indoor personal best.

==== 2021 ====
In New York, Hiltz competed in the 1500 m at New Balance Indoor Grand Prix. At the 2021 United States Olympic trials, Hiltz contested both the 800 m and 1500 m. They failed to qualify for the final in either event placing 13th in the 1500 m and 17th in the 800 m.

==== 2022 ====
In the summer of 2022, no longer sponsored by Adidas, Hiltz announced that they had signed with Lululemon. On September 11, Hiltz finished second in the 2022 the Fifth Avenue Mile in 4:17.4 behind winner Laura Muir. At the USA Indoor National Championships in Spokane, Washington, Hiltz finished 10th in the 1500 meters. At the USA Outdoor National Championships in Eugene, Oregon, Hiltz finished 6th in the 1500 meters.

Hiltz won first place in the mile at the Falmouth Track Festival in Falmouth, Massachusetts, the Sir Walter Miler in Raleigh, and the Fleet Feet Liberty Mile in Pittsburgh. Hiltz also won the 1500 meters race at the Sound Running Sunset Tour #3 in Los Angeles.

==== 2023 ====
Nikki Hiltz won their first outdoor USATF Outdoor National Championship title in the 1500 in 4:03.10, moving from 3rd to 1st in the last 300 m. On July 21, 2023, Hiltz finished 6th in the mile at the Monaco Diamond League in a time of 4:16.35, a personal best, North American Area Record and an American Record.

Hiltz also won the mile or 1500 meters races at the Start to the Park 10k and Kalakaua Merrie Mile in Honolulu, Fast 5000 in Montesson, France, Trond Mohn Games in Bergen, Norway, and the Drake Relays in Des Moines, Iowa.

==== 2024 ====
In the first race of the 2024 season, Hiltz won the 1,000-meter run at the Mile City Mayhem Event at the UW Invitational in 2:34.09, setting a personal best and American Indoor Record.

In an effort to test endurance, Hiltz decided to contest the 2 mile at the 2024 Millrose Games rather than their specialty event, the mile. Competing on February 11, they placed 4th in a time of 9:15.80 which improved upon their personal best set in 2019 by almost 40 seconds. The following week, Nikki contested the 1500 m at the US Indoor Championships in Albuquerque, successfully defending their US indoor title in a time of 4:08.35. Placing top two, alongside Emily Mackay, qualified Hiltz to compete at the 2024 World Athletics Indoor Championships in Glasgow.

In the qualifying round, on March 1, Hiltz posted the fastest time of the heats, running an indoor personal best of 4:04.34. In the final, Hiltz took second place behind Freweyni Hailu in a personal best of 4:02.32, earning a first global medal and becoming the first American to medal in the event since Regina Jacobs in 2003. Hiltz was joined on the podium by fellow American Emily Mackay who took bronze.

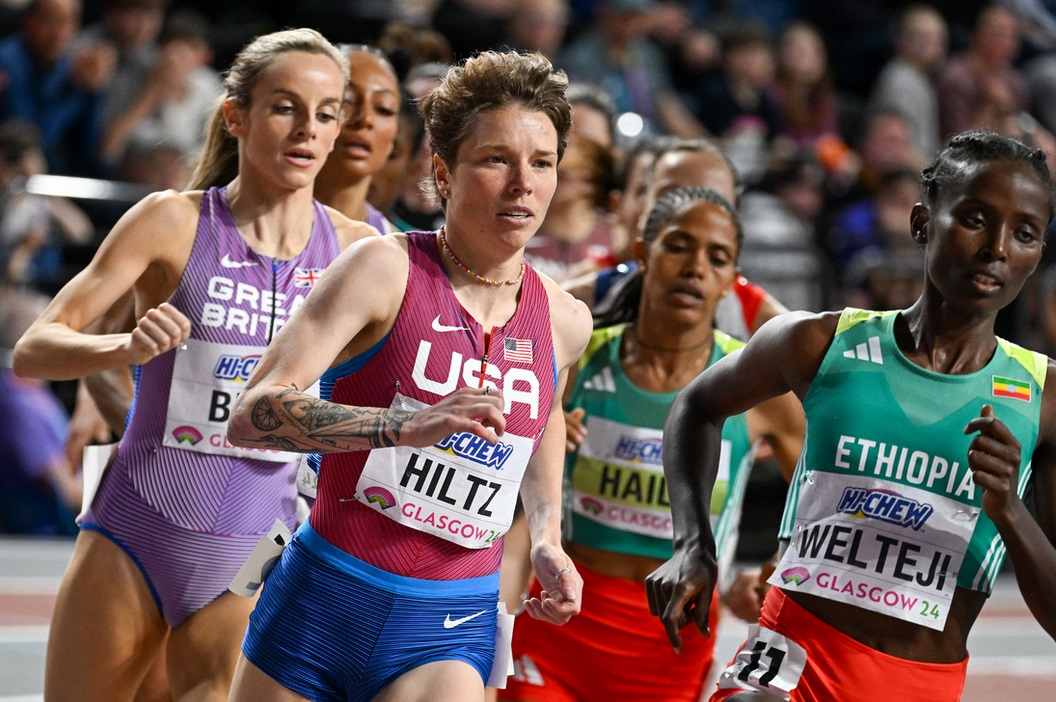
Hiltz competing in the final at the 2024 World Indoor Championships

In the 2024 US Olympic Trials, Hiltz competed in the 1500 m run and made it through the preliminaries and semifinals. In the final, Hiltz won in a time of 3:55.33, thereby making the Olympic Team, and also setting a new trials record.

At the 2024 Paris Olympics, Hiltz finished third in both their preliminary heat and semifinal heat, qualifying for the final. In the Women's 1500 meter final, Hiltz finished seventh with a time of 3:56.38.

In October 2024, it was announced that Hiltz had signed up for the inaugural season of the Michael Johnson founded Grand Slam Track.

==== 2025 ====
On February 23, 2025, Hiltz became the first person to win five consecutive U.S. 1500 m titles (both indoor and outdoor) as they finished first in the 1500 m with a time of 4:05.76 in the 2025 USA Indoor Track and Field Championships. They won the 3000 m in 8:48.28 on the previous day, making them the first person to sweep the 1500 and 3000 m in the competition since Shelby Houlihan in 2020.

In early 2025, Hiltz parted ways with coach Mike Smith and began being coached by Juli Benson. At the first Grand Slam Track in Kingston, Jamaica, Hiltz won the 800 m race with a personal best of 1:58.23.

Hiltz finished fifth in the 2025 Prefontaine Classic 1500 m with a time of 3:55.96, their second best time in the distance to date, as Faith Kipyegon set a world record in the 1500 m.

Hiltz finished first in the 1500 m in the 2025 USA Outdoor Track and Field Championships with a time of 4:03.15, securing their place in the 2025 World Athletics Championships and winning their eighth consecutive U.S. title.

Hiltz won the 1500 m at the 2025 Memorial Van Damme on August 22, 2025, as part of the 2025 Diamond League, finishing with a time of 3:55.94.

After finishing third in the second semifinal, Hiltz qualified for the 1500 m final of the 2025 World Athletics Championships. Racing in the final, they finished fifth overall with a time of 3:57.08, the top American in the race. Describing their experience of the race, Hiltz said “It got harder and harder every step, almost so it kind of just runs the legs out of you.”

==== 2026 ====
Hiltz was named to the LGBTQ Sports Hall of Fame, part of the 2026 induction class, in January 2026.

On February 1, 2026, Hiltz won the Wanamaker Mile race at the 2026 Millrose Games with a time of 4:19.64, their personal best for an indoor mile. Their win also marked a world-leading time at that point in the season.

Competing in the ASICS Sound Invite on February 15, 2026, Hiltz won the 3000 m with a time of 8:34.98, a facility record at JDL Fast Track in Winston-Salem, North Carolina.

Hiltz won the 1500 m at the 2026 USATF Indoor Championship on March 1, 2026, finishing with a time of 4:11.34, a 0.05 second margin faster than Grace Morris. It extended their record, marking seven consecutive national indoor and outdoor 1500 m wins. The win qualified Hiltz for the 2026 World Athletics Indoor Championships in Toruń, Poland, which they decided to compete at.

Competing in the first heat in the 1500 m at the 2026 World Athletics Indoor Championships on March 20, 2026, Hiltz finished in second place, behind Agathe Guillemot, with a time of 4:16.32, qualifying them for the final. On March 22, Hiltz won bronze, finishing in the final with a time of 3:59.68, their indoor personal best and three hundredths of a second quicker that Guillemont, who Hiltz beat on a lean.

In June 2026, Hiltz was named to Time's list of The 100 Most Influential People in Sports 2026.

Competing in the 2026 Prefontaine Classic on July 4, 2026, Hiltz won in the mile race with a time of 4:17.49, a world-leading performance. Speaking after the race, Hiltz said that the win carried special significance for them as it came immediately after the US Supreme Court decision which upheld state bans on transgender women and girls from competing in sports against cisgender women and girls, with Hiltz saying of their articipation in competitive athletics “For me, I want to show that trans people can be in sport, be affirmed in their gender. We’re not these big, scary things.”

In September 2026, Hiltz competed in the ATHLOS event in London in the 1 mile race, finishing in 4th place in a time of 4:22:72.

==== Personal bests ====
	Event	Time	Date	Location
Outdoor	800 m	1:58.23	4 April 2025	Kingston, Jamaica
Outdoor	1500 m	3:55.33	30 June 2024	Eugene, Oregon
Outdoor	Mile	4:16.35	21 July 2023	Monaco
Outdoor	5 km	16:35	22 November 2018	San Jose, California
Indoor	800 m	2:02.51	7 February 2021	Fayetteville, Arkansas
Indoor	1000 m	2:34.09	27 January 2024	Seattle, Washington
Indoor	1500 m	3:59.68	22 March 2026	Toruń, Poland
Indoor	Mile	4:19.64	1 February 2026	New York City
Indoor	3000 m	8:39.92	11 February 2024	New York City
Indoor	2 miles	9:15.80	11 February 2024	New York City

== Personal life ==
In 2020, Hiltz founded Pride 5k, an annual charity race that has raised over $172,000 for The Trevor Project, a non-profit organization focused on suicide prevention efforts among LGBTQ youth. Thousands of people have supported the race.

Since 2020, Hiltz has been in a relationship with Emma Gee, the first openly LGBT student-athlete to compete for Brigham Young University. Gee later competed for Temple University where she qualified for the 2021 NCAA Division I Outdoor Track and Field Championships. The two live in Flagstaff, Arizona with their dog, Scout.

In 2021, Hiltz started using they/them pronouns. Hiltz has credited part of their success in track and field to the support received through the LGBTQ+ community.

Hiltz has one sister, Michaela.

Hiltz had top surgery in September 2024. Speaking in 2025 about their surgery, they said, "I had this surgery planned last year after the Olympics, and ever since, it was kind of a long recovery, but just each month, I've just felt more and more like myself". Hiltz added, "I think whatever you're doing off the track always tends to translate on".

Hiltz has advocated against sex testing in sports. In March 2026, Hiltz spoke against the newly announced policy of the International Olympic Committee barring transgender women from participation in the Olympic games and IOC events and implementing genetic sex testing for athletes. Hiltz stated, "Attacks on trans people have consistently led to more policing and regulation of ALL women's bodies. Everyone is hurt by transphobia".

== Competition record ==
=== Circuit performances ===
Grand Slam Track results
Slam	Race group	Event	Pl.	Time	Prize money
2025 Kingston Slam	Short distance	800 m	1st	1:58.23	US$50,000
2025 Kingston Slam	Short distance	1500 m	3rd	4:05.39	US$50,000
2025 Miami Slam	Short distance	1500 m	2nd	4:07.08	US$50,000
2025 Miami Slam	Short distance	800 m	2nd	1:59.75	US$50,000
2025 Philadelphia Slam	Short distance	1500 m	3rd	4:00.54	US$20,000
2025 Philadelphia Slam	Short distance	800 m	7th	2:01.43	US$20,000

=== International Competitions ===
Representing the United States
Year	Competition	Venue	Position	Event	Time
2019	Pan American Games	Lima, Peru	1st	1500 m	4:07.14
2019	World Championships	Khalifa International Stadium	12th	1500 m	4:06.68
2023	World Championships	Budapest, Hungary	17th	1500 m	4:00.84
2024	World Indoor Championships	Glasgow, Scotland	2nd	1500 m	4:02.32
2024	Olympic Games	Paris, France	7th	1500 m	3:56.38
2025	World Championships	Tokyo, Japan	5th	1500 m	3:57:08
2026	World Indoor Championships	Toruń, Poland	3rd	1500 m	3:59.68

=== National Championships ===
Representing Aptos High School (2011–12), Arkansas Razorbacks (2017–18), Adidas (2019–21), and Lululemon (2022-present)
Year	Competition	Venue	Position	Event	Time
2011	USA Junior Track and Field Championships	Eugene, Oregon	4th	1500 m	4:26.13
2012	USA Junior Track and Field Championships	Bloomington, Indiana	6th	1500 m	4:29.52
2017	USA Outdoor Track and Field Championships	Sacramento, California	6th	1500 m	4:10.28
2018	USA Outdoor Track and Field Championships	Des Moines, Iowa	9th	1500 m	4:15.03
2019	USA 1 Mile Road Championships	Des Moines, Iowa	1st	Mile	4:29.7
2019	USA Outdoor Track and Field Championships	Des Moines, Iowa	3rd	1500 m	4:03.55
2021	United States Olympic Trials	Eugene, Oregon	13th	1500 m	4:10.60
2021	United States Olympic Trials	Eugene, Oregon	17th	800 m	2:01.42
2022	USA Indoor Track and Field Championships	Spokane, Washington	10th	1500 m	4:10.7
2022	USA Outdoor Track and Field Championships	Eugene, Oregon	6th	1500 m	4:10.97
2023	USA Indoor Track and Field Championships	Albuquerque, New Mexico	1st	1500 m	4:17.10
2023	USA 1 Mile Road Championships	Des Moines, Iowa	1st	Mile	4:28.0
2023	USA Outdoor Track and Field Championships	Eugene, Oregon	1st	1500 m	4:03.10
2024	USA Indoor Track and Field Championships	Albuquerque, New Mexico	1st	1500 m	4:08.35
2024	United States Olympic Trials	Eugene, Oregon	1st	1500 m	3:55.33
2025	USA Indoor Track and Field Championships	Staten Island, New York	1st	3000 m	8:48.28
2025	USA Indoor Track and Field Championships	Staten Island, New York	1st	1500 m	4:05.76
2025	USA Outdoor Track and Field Championships	Eugene, Oregon	1st	1500 m	4:03.15
2026	USA Indoor Track and Field Championships	Staten Island, New York	1st	1500 m	4:11.34

=== NCAA Championships ===
Representing the Oregon Ducks (2014–15) and Arkansas Razorbacks (2015–2018)
Year	Competition	Venue	Position	Event	Time
2015	NCAA Indoor Track and Field Championships	Fayetteville, Arkansas	11th	Mile	4:38.47
2015	NCAA Outdoor Track and Field Championships	Eugene, Oregon	11th	1500 m	4:31.26
2016	NCAA Indoor Track and Field Championships	Birmingham, Alabama	5th	DMR	10:59.22
2016	NCAA Cross Country Championships	Terre Haute, Indiana	151st	6 km	21:04.8
2017	NCAA Indoor Track and Field Championships	College Station, Texas	6th	Mile	4:34.57
2017	NCAA Outdoor Track and Field Championships	Eugene, Oregon	2nd	1500 m	4:13.80
2017	NCAA Cross Country Championships	Louisville, Kentucky	87th	6 km	20:37.2
2018	NCAA Indoor Track and Field Championships	College Station, Texas	3rd	Mile	4:32.59
2018	NCAA Outdoor Track and Field Championships	Eugene, Oregon	2nd	1500 m	4:09.14
