= Abbey Caldwell =

Australian athlete (born 2001)

- Caldwell at the 2026 Commonwealth Games

Personal information
- Born: 3 July 2001 (age 25) Mitcham, Victoria, Australia
- Height: 1.68 m (5 ft 6 in)

Sport
- Sport: Track and Field
- Event: Middle distance

Achievements and titles
- Personal bests: 800 m: 1:57.70 (Chorzów 2025); 1000 m: 2:32.94 (Xiamen 2025); 1500 m: 3:56.12 (Shanghai 2026); Mile: 4:20.51 (Monaco 2023); 3000 m: 8:51.49 (Melbourne 2024)
Medal record
Women's athletics
Representing Australia
Commonwealth Games
Gold medal – first place	2026 Glasgow	Mile
Bronze medal – third place	2022 Birmingham	1500 m
Oceania Championships
Silver medal – second place	2022 Mackay	1500 m
World Cross Country Championships
Bronze medal – third place	2023 Bathurst	Mixed relay

Abbey Caldwell (born 3 July 2001) is an Australian middle-distance athlete. She won the Australian national championships in the 800 metres in 2025 and 2026, and holds the Oceanian record in the 1000 metres. She won the gold medal in the mile run at the 2026 Commonwealth Games.

== Biography ==
Caldwell begun running at five years old, and steadily improved as a junior, coached by Gavin Burren since age 13.

=== 2022 ===
In 2022, aged 20, Caldwell won the Australian national title in the 1500 metres ahead of Olympic finalist Linden Hall. A breakthrough year, she went on to set multiple personal bests in the 800 metres and 1500 metres, culminating in a 1500 m bronze medal at the 2022 Commonwealth Games behind British pair Laura Muir and Ciara Mageean and the silver medal in the 1500 m at the 2022 Oceania Athletics Championships behind Claudia Hollingsworth but ahead of Jaylah Hancock-Cameron in an Australian sweep of the medals.

=== 2023 ===
In February 2023 at the World Athletics Cross Country Championships, held in Australia, Caldwell anchored the mixed relay, alongside Oliver Hoare, Jessica Hull and Stewart McSweyn, to win another bronze medal.

In July 2023, she ran an 800 metres personal best of 1:58.48 at the Silesia Diamond league lin Chorzów. Selected for the 1500 m at the 2023 World Athletics Championships, she qualified for the semi-finals, breaking four minutes for the first time in her career with a time of 3:59.79.

=== 2024 ===
In April 2024, she won silver at the Australian Athletics Championships in the 800 metres race. She competed in the 800 metres at the 2024 Summer Olympics in Paris in August 2024, where she reached the semi-finals.

=== 2025 ===
She was selected for the 800 metres at the 2025 World Athletics Indoor Championships in Nanjing in March 2025. She won the 800 metres title at the Australian Athletics Championships on 13 April 2025 in Perth in a time of 2:00.51, finishing ahead of Claudia Hollingsworth.

At the Diamond League opener in Xiamen, Caldwell lowered ran a new Oceanic record in the 100 m to 2:32.94, finishing second behind Faith Kipyegon. In May 2025, she was named as a challenger for the short distance category at the 2025 Grand Slam Track event in Philadelphia. On 6 June 2025, she finished third over 1500 metres at the 2025 Golden Gala in Rome, part of the 2025 Diamond League, running 3:59.32. She set a new personal best at the 2025 Kamila Skolimowska Memorial, in Poland, with a run of 1:57.70 for the 800 metres. She was a semi-finalist in the women's 800 metres at the 2025 World Athletics Championships in Tokyo, Japan.

=== 2026 ===
Caldwell ran a meeting record 4:02.62 to win the 1500 metres at the Perth Track Classic on 14 February 2026, finishing ahead of Nozomi Tanaka. In March, Caldwell bettered her own meet record to win the 800 m in a time of 2:00.04 at the Adelaide Invitational. Caldwell was third across the line in the 1500 metres at the 2026 Australian Championships on 10 April, in a controversial race finish that saw Jessica Hull fall, and Claudia Hollingsworth finish first with Sarah Billings second and initially declared the winner before Hollingsworth was reinstated. On 12 April, she defeated Hollingsworth to retain her Australian national title over 800 metres, running 1:58.57. The following month, Caldwell moved to second on the Australian all-time list for the 1500 metres with a run of 3:56.12 to place third at the 2026 Shanghai Diamond League. The following week, she won the 1500 m in 3:57.26 at the 2026 Xiamen Diamond League. On 14 July, Caldwell led Hollingsworth in an Australian one-two over 1500 metres at the István Gyulai Memorial, in Budapest. On 1 August, they were joined by Jess Hull in an Australian 1-2-3 in the mile run at the 2026 Commonwealth Games, with Caldwell leading the trio across the line for the gold medal. At the 2026 Diamond League Final in Brussels in September, she placed seventh over 1500 metres. The following week, she placed sixth over 1500 m at the inaugural World Ultimate Championship in Budapest.

== Circuit performances ==
Grand Slam Track results
Slam	Race group	Event	Pl.	Time	Prize money
2025 Philadelphia Slam	Short distance	1500 m	5th	4:01.54	US$25,000
2025 Philadelphia Slam	Short distance	800 m	4th	2:00.57	US$25,000

== Personal life ==
Caldwell studied health sciences at Deakin University.
