= 2026 World Athletics Ultimate Championship – Women's 5000 metres =

Women's 5000 metres at the 2026 World Athletics Ultimate Championship
- Venue: National Athletics Centre
- Location: Budapest, Hungary
- Dates: 13 September 2026 (final)
- Competitors: 12 from 6 nations
- Winning time: 14:30.36

Champion
- Likina Amebaw; Ethiopia

The women's 5000 metres was held as a straight final at the 2026 World Athletics Ultimate Championship at the National Athletics Centre in Budapest, Hungary on 13 September 2026. It was the first time the World Ultimate Championship is held. Athletes qualified by wildcard or by their world ranking.

== Background ==
Global records before the 2026 World Athletics Ultimate Championship
Record	Time	Athlete (nation)	Location	Date
World record	13:58.06	Beatrice Chebet (KEN)	Eugene, United States	5 July 2025
World lead	14:18.41	Likina Amebaw (ETH)	Rome, Italy	4 June 2026

Area records before the 2026 World Athletics Ultimate Championship
Record	Time	Athlete (nation)	Location	Date
African record	13:58.06	Beatrice Chebet (KEN)	Eugene, United States	5 July 2025
Asian record	14:28.09	Bo Jiang (CHN)	Shanghai, China	23 October 1997
European record	14:13.42	Sifan Hassan (NED)	London, United Kingdom	23 July 2023
North, Central American, and Caribbean record	14:19.45	Alicia Monson (USA)	London, United Kingdom	23 July 2023
Oceanian record	14:31.45	Rose Davies (AUS)	London, United Kingdom	19 July 2025
South American record	14:36.59	Joselyn Daniely Brea (VEN)	Los Angeles, United States	17 May 2024

== Qualification ==
For the 5000 metres, twelve athletes qualified, up to three by wildcard for winners of the event at the 2024 Summer Olympic, the 2025 World Athletics Championships, or the 2026 Diamond League final and the others by their position at the World Athletics Rankings for the event on 3 September 2026.

== Results ==
=== Final ===
The final was held on 13 September at 19:10 (UTC+2).

Place	Athlete	Nation	Time	Notes
1st place, gold medalist(s)	Likina Amebaw	Ethiopia	14:30.36	
2	Jessica Hull	Australia	14:32.39	PB
3	Fantaye Belayneh	Ethiopia	14:32.62	
4	Freweyni Hailu	Ethiopia	14:32.76	
5	Aleshign Baweke	Ethiopia	14:32.95	
6	Rose Davies	Australia	14:35.64	SB
7	Senayet Getachew	Ethiopia	14:38.65	
8	Maureen Koster	Netherlands	14:38.78	
9	Hirut Meshesha	Ethiopia	14:42.49	
10	Marta García	Spain	14:43.94	SB
11	Hannah Nuttall	Great Britain	15:00.04	
12	Shelby Houlihan	United States	15:18.65	
