= Athletics at the 2020 Summer Olympics – Women's 1500 metres =

Women's 1500 metres at the Games of the XXXII Olympiad
- Olympic Athletics
- Venue: Japan National Stadium
- Dates: 2 August 2021 (heats); 4 August 2021 (semifinals); 6 August 2021 (final)
- Competitors: 45 from 25 nations
- Winning time: 3:53.11 OR

Medalists
1st place, gold medalist(s)		Faith Kipyegon	Kenya
2nd place, silver medalist(s)		Laura Muir	Great Britain
3rd place, bronze medalist(s)		Sifan Hassan	Netherlands

Official Replay

The women's 1500 metres event at the 2020 Summer Olympics took place from 2 to 6 August 2021 at the Japan National Stadium. 45 athletes from 25 nations competed. Kenya's Faith Kipyegon successfully defended her Olympic title, to become one of only two women, along with Tatyana Kazankina, to win two Olympic 1500 metres titles. Her winning time of 3:53.11, broke Paula Ivan's 33-year-old Olympic record. The silver medal went to Great Britain's Laura Muir and the bronze went to Sifan Hassan of the Netherlands.

== Summary ==
Sifan Hassan had already announced her intention to attempt to win the 1500, 5000, and 10,000 metres triple at the Olympics. On the day, she had already won her first race, the qualifying heat for the 5000 metres final, this was to be her second race of the night. Faith Kipyegon was the defending Olympic champion, 2017 World Champion and runner up to Hassan at the 2019 World Championships.

On the final lap of the second heat, Claudia Bobocea stumbled, causing Natalia Hawthorn to lose her stride and put her arm out trying to keep her balance, in turn causing Edinah Jebitok to trip. A step behind her, Hassan tripped and was down on the track. With 14 Olympic athletes ahead of her, Hassan quickly got back to her feet and ran after them. Hassan not only got back to a qualifying position, she won the heat. Later that evening she won the 5000 metres. Jebitok was later granted a position in the semis.

The semis also produced their own drama first when Winny Chebet tripped on the second lap, collecting Cory McGee during her fall. The injured McGee finished 10th but was granted a position in the final by the referee. That same semi was won by Kipyegon in 3:56.80, the third fastest time in Olympic history. Chasing her, Jessica Hull set the Oceania continental record, Nozomi Tanaka and Kristiina Mäki setting national records for the Japan and the Czech Republic respectively. The other semi-final was largely uneventful, with Hassan winning in 4:00.23, ahead of Laura Muir and Linden Hall.

As the final began, Gabriela DeBues-Stafford moved to the front and Hassan dropped to the back of the pack, with Kipyegon and Muir also dropping back to watch her. Half a lap into the race, Hassan floated up to the front to take the lead with Kipyegon and Muir following closely behind. Hassan set a fast pace, completing the first two laps in 2:07.0. Through the next 3/4 of a lap, a pack of six runners broke off, then before the bell, two more fell off pace leaving Hassan, Kipyegon, Muir and DeBues-Stafford in that order. Through the penultimate turn, Kipyegon moved onto Hassan's shoulder. DeBues-Stafford fell off the back as Kipyegon started to try to go by Hassan, the two sprinting side by side down the backstretch with Muir a step behind. With 200 metres to go, Kipyegon got past Hassan, Muir in tow. Through the turn Kipyegon pulled away, Muir on the outside kept inching her way around Hassan, finally passing her just before the end of the turn. Kipyegon won gold with a time of 3:53.11, beating the old Olympic record set in 1988 by Paula Ivan, Muir collected the silver medal in a new British record; 3:54.20. Hassan completed the podium with a time of 3:55.86.

Kipyegon joined Tatyana Kazankina as the only woman to successfully defend the Olympic 1500 metres title.

== Background ==
This was the 13th time the event was held, having appeared at every Olympics since 1972.

== Qualification ==
A National Olympic Committee (NOC) could enter up to 3 qualified athletes in the women's 1500 metres event if all athletes meet the entry standard or qualify by ranking during the qualifying period. (The limit of 3 has been in place since the 1930 Olympic Congress.) The qualifying standard is 4:04.20. This standard was "set for the sole purpose of qualifying athletes with exceptional performances unable to qualify through the IAAF World Rankings pathway." The world rankings, based on the average of the best five results for the athlete over the qualifying period and weighted by the importance of the meet, will then be used to qualify athletes until the cap of 45 is reached.

The qualifying period was originally from 1 May 2019 to 29 June 2020. Due to the COVID-19 pandemic, the period was suspended from 6 April 2020 to 30 November 2020, with the end date extended to 29 June 2021. The world rankings period start date was also changed from 1 May 2019 to 30 June 2020; athletes who had met the qualifying standard during that time were still qualified, but those using world rankings would not be able to count performances during that time. The qualifying time standards could be obtained in various meets during the given period that have the approval of the IAAF. Both indoor and outdoor meets were eligible for qualifying. The most recent Area Championships may be counted in the ranking, even if not during the qualifying period.

NOCs can also use their universality place—each NOC can enter one female athlete regardless of time if they had no female athletes meeting the entry standard for an athletics event—in the 1500 metres.

== Competition format ==
The event continued to use the three-round format introduced in 2012.

== Records ==
Prior to this competition, the existing global and area records were as follows.

World record	Genzebe Dibaba (ETH)	3:50.07	Fontvieille, Monaco	17 July 2015
Olympic record	Paula Ivan (ROU)	3:53.96	Seoul, South Korea	1 October 1988
World Leading	Faith Kipyegon (KEN)	3:51.07	Fontvieille, Monaco	9 July 2021

Area
Area	Time (s)	Athlete	Nation
Africa (records)	3:50.07 WR	Genzebe Dibaba	Ethiopia
Asia (records)	3:50.46	Qu Yunxia	China
Europe (records)	3:51.95	Sifan Hassan	Netherlands
North, Central America and Caribbean (records)	3:54.99	Shelby Houlihan	United States
Oceania (records)	4:00.93	Sarah Jamieson	Australia
Oceania (records)	4:00.42	Jessica Hull	Australia
Oceania (records)	3:59.67	Linden Hall	Australia
South America (records)	4:05.67	Letitia Vriesde	Suriname

The following records were established during the competition:

Date	Event	Athlete	Nation	Time	Record
6 August	Final	Faith Kipyegon	Kenya	3:53.11	OR

The following national records were established during the competition:

Nation	Athlete	Round	Time	Notes
Finland	Sara Kuivisto	Heats	4:04.10	
Finland	Sara Kuivisto	Semifinals	4:02.35	
Japan	Nozomi Tanaka	Heats	4:02.33	
Japan	Nozomi Tanaka	Semifinals	3:59.19	
Australia	Jessica Hull	Semifinals	3:58.81	AR
Czech Republic	Kristiina Mäki	Semifinals	4:01.23	
Great Britain	Laura Muir	Final	3:54.50	

== Schedule ==
All times are Japan Standard Time (UTC+9)

The women's 1500 metres took place over three separate days.

Date	Time	Round
Monday, 2 August 2021	9:00	Round 1
Wednesday, 4 August 2021	18:30	Semifinals
Friday, 6 August 2021	21:50	Final

== Results ==
=== Heats ===
Qualification rule: first 6 in each heat (Q) and the next 6 fastest times (q) qualified.

==== Heat 1 ====
Rank	Athlete	Nation	Time	Notes
1	Gabriela DeBues-Stafford	Canada	4:03.70	Q
2	Laura Muir	Great Britain	4:03.89	Q
3	Winny Chebet	Kenya	4:03.93	Q
4	Sara Kuivisto	Finland	4:04.10	Q, NR
5	Freweyni Hailu	Ethiopia	4:04.12	Q
6	Kristiina Mäki	Czech Republic	4:04.55	Q, PB
7	Marta Pérez	Spain	4:04.76	q, PB
8	Cory McGee	United States	4:05.15	q
9	Elise Vanderelst	Belgium	4:05.63	q
10	Ciara Mageean	Ireland	4:07.29	
11	Federica Del Buono	Italy	4:07.70	SB
12	Laura Galván	Mexico	4:08.15	
13	Salomé Afonso	Portugal	4:10.80	
14	Georgia Griffith	Australia	4:14.43	SB
15	Hanna Klein	Germany	4:14.83	

==== Heat 2 ====
Rank	Athlete	Nation	Time	Notes
1	Sifan Hassan	Netherlands	4:05.17	Q
2	Jessica Hull	Australia	4:05.28	Q
3	Elle Purrier St. Pierre	United States	4:05.34	Q
4	Gaia Sabbatini	Italy	4:05.41	Q
5	Lemlem Hailu	Ethiopia	4:05.49 (.485)	Q
6	Diana Mezuliáníková	Czech Republic	4:05.49 (.490)	Q, PB
7	Revée Walcott-Nolan	Great Britain	4:06.23	PB
8	Esther Guerrero	Spain	4:07.08	
9	Ran Urabe	Japan	4:07.90	PB
10	Natalia Hawthorn	Canada	4:08.04	
11	Claudia Bobocea	Romania	4:09.19	
12	Edinah Jebitok	Kenya	4:10.72	qR
13	Aisha Praught-Leer	Jamaica	4:15.31	
14	Anjelina Lohalith	Refugee Olympic Team	4:31.65	PB
15	María Pía Fernández	Uruguay	4:59.36	

==== Heat 3 ====
Rank	Athlete	Nation	Time	Notes
1	Faith Kipyegon	Kenya	4:01.40	Q
2	Winnie Nanyondo	Uganda	4:02.24	Q
3	Linden Hall	Australia	4:02.27	Q
4	Nozomi Tanaka	Japan	4:02.33	Q, NR
5	Heather MacLean	United States	4:02.40	Q
6	Katie Snowden	Great Britain	4:02.77	Q, PB
7	Lucia Stafford	Canada	4:03.52	q, PB
8	Martyna Galant	Poland	4:05.03	q, PB
9	Caterina Granz	Germany	4:06.22	q, SB
10	Marta Pen	Portugal	4:07.33	qJ
11	Sarah Healy	Ireland	4:09.78	
12	Diribe Welteji	Ethiopia	4:10.25	
13	Simona Vrzalová	Czech Republic	4:19.46	
—	Souhra Ali Mohamed	Djibouti	DNF	
—	Rababe Arafi	Morocco	DNF	

=== Semifinals ===
Qualification rule: first 5 in each heat (Q) and the next 2 fastest times (q) qualified.

==== Semifinal 1 ====
Rank	Athlete	Nation	Time	Notes
1	Faith Kipyegon	Kenya	3:56.80	Q
2	Freweyni Hailu	Ethiopia	3:57.54	Q
3	Gabriela DeBues-Stafford	Canada	3:58.28	Q, SB
4	Jessica Hull	Australia	3:58.81	Q, AR
5	Nozomi Tanaka	Japan	3:59.19	Q, NR
6	Elle Purrier St. Pierre	United States	4:01.00	q
7	Kristiina Mäki	Czech Republic	4:01.23	q, NR
8	Gaia Sabbatini	Italy	4:02.25	PB
9	Katie Snowden	Great Britain	4:02.93	
10	Martyna Galant	Poland	4:06.01	
11	Cory McGee	United States	4:10.39	qR
12	Caterina Granz	Germany	4:10.93	
13	Winny Chebet	Kenya	4:11.62	

==== Semifinal 2 ====
Rank	Athlete	Nation	Time	Notes
1	Sifan Hassan	Netherlands	4:00.23	Q
2	Laura Muir	Great Britain	4:00.73	Q
3	Linden Hall	Australia	4:01.37	Q
4	Winnie Nanyondo	Uganda	4:01.64	Q
5	Marta Pérez	Spain	4:01.69	Q, PB
6	Lucia Stafford	Canada	4:02.12	PB
7	Sara Kuivisto	Finland	4:02.35	NR
8	Diana Mezuliáníková	Czech Republic	4:03.70	PB
9	Lemlem Hailu	Ethiopia	4:03.76	
10	Marta Pen	Portugal	4:04.15	SB
11	Elise Vanderelst	Belgium	4:04.86	
12	Heather MacLean	United States	4:05.33	
13	Edinah Jebitok	Kenya	4:05.56	

=== Final ===
Rank	Athlete	Nation	Time	Notes
1st place, gold medalist(s)	Faith Kipyegon	Kenya	3:53.11	OR
2nd place, silver medalist(s)	Laura Muir	Great Britain	3:54.50	NR
3rd place, bronze medalist(s)	Sifan Hassan	Netherlands	3:55.86	
4	Freweyni Hailu	Ethiopia	3:57.60	
5	Gabriela DeBues-Stafford	Canada	3:58.93	
6	Linden Hall	Australia	3:59.01	PB
7	Winnie Nanyondo	Uganda	3:59.80	SB
8	Nozomi Tanaka	Japan	3:59.95	
9	Marta Pérez	Spain	4:00.12	PB
10	Elle Purrier St. Pierre	United States	4:01.75	
11	Jessica Hull	Australia	4:02.63	
12	Cory McGee	United States	4:05.50	
13	Kristiina Mäki	Czech Republic	4:11.76	
