= 2024 World Athletics Indoor Championships – Women's 1500 metres =

Women's 1500 metres at the 2024 World Athletics Indoor Championships
- Venue: Commonwealth Arena
- Dates: 1 & 3 March
- Competitors: 28 from 20 nations
- Winning time: 4:01.46

Medalists
gold medal	Freweyni Hailu	Ethiopia
silver medal	Nikki Hiltz	United States
bronze medal	Emily Mackay	United States

The women's 1500 metres at the 2024 World Athletics Indoor Championships took place on 1 and 3 March 2024.

== Results ==
=== Heats ===
Qualification: First 3 in each heat (Q) advance to the Final. The heats were started on 1 March at 19:05.

==== Heat 1 ====
Rank	Athlete	Nation	Time	Notes
1	Freweyni Hailu	Ethiopia	4:12.38	Q
2	Revee Walcott-Nolan	Great Britain	4:13.06	Q
3	Esther Guerrero	Spain	4:14.23	Q
4	Vera Hoffmann	Luxembourg	4:15.52	SB
5	Yolanda Ngarambe	Sweden	4:15.77	
6	Sofia Thøgersen	Denmark	4:16.06	
7	María Pía Fernández	Uruguay	4:17.77	NR

==== Heat 2 ====
Rank	Athlete	Nation	Time	Notes
1	Nikki Hiltz	United States	4:04.34	Q
2	Georgia Bell	Great Britain	4:04.39	Q
3	Maia Ramsden	New Zealand	4:06.51	Q, NR
4	Linden Hall	Australia	4:09.83	SB
5	Elise Vanderelst	Belgium	4:10.15	
6	Weronika Lizakowska	Poland	4:10.50	
—	Claudia Mihaela Bobocea	Romania	DNF	

==== Heat 3 ====
Rank	Athlete	Nation	Time	Notes
1	Diribe Welteji	Ethiopia	4:07.17	Q
2	Salomé Afonso	Portugal	4:07.55	Q
3	Emily Mackay	United States	4:08.04	Q
4	Marta Pérez	Spain	4:12.27	
5	Simone Plourde	Canada	4:13.40	
6	Joceline Wind	Switzerland	4:15.29	
7	Fedra Aldana Luna	Argentina	4:17.14	SB

==== Heat 4 ====
Rank	Athlete	Nation	Time	Notes
1	Agathe Guillemot	France	4:11.46	Q
2	Birke Haylom	Ethiopia	4:11.54	Q
3	Lucia Stafford	Canada	4:11.56	Q
4	Martyna Galant	Poland	4:15.57	
5	Lenuta Petronela Simiuc	Romania	4:18.52	
6	Sarah Healy	Ireland	4:18.86	
7	Giulia Aprile	Italy	4:20.21	

=== Final ===
The final was started at 21:45.

Rank	Name	Nationality	Time	Notes
1st place, gold medalist(s)	Freweyni Hailu	Ethiopia	4:01.46	
2nd place, silver medalist(s)	Nikki Hiltz	United States	4:02.32	PB
3rd place, bronze medalist(s)	Emily Mackay	United States	4:02.69	PB
4	Georgia Bell	Great Britain	4:03.47	
5	Diribe Welteji	Ethiopia	4:03.82	
6	Revee Walcott-Nolan	Great Britain	4:04.60	
7	Agathe Guillemot	France	4:04.94	
8	Salomé Afonso	Portugal	4:06.18	PB
9	Birke Haylom	Ethiopia	4:06.27	
10	Maia Ramsden	New Zealand	4:06.88	
11	Lucia Stafford	Canada	4:08.90	
12	Esther Guerrero	Spain	4:12.33	
