= Athletics at the 2023 Pan American Games – Women's 1500 metres =

Women's 1500 metres at the 2023 Pan American Games
- Venue: Julio Martínez National Stadium
- Dates: November 2
- Competitors: 10 from 9 nations
- Winning time: 4:11.80

Medalists
Gold medal	Joselyn Brea	Venezuela
Silver medal	Daily Cooper	Cuba
Bronze medal	Emily Mackay	United States

The women's 1500 metres competition of the athletics events at the 2023 Pan American Games was held on November 3 at the Estadio Nacional Julio Martínez Prádanos.

== Records ==
Prior to this competition, the existing world and Pan American Games records were as follows:

World record	Faith Kipyegon (ETH)	3:49.11	Florence, Italy	June 2, 2023
Pan American Games record	Mary Decker (USA)	4:05.70	San Juan, Puerto Rico	July 13, 1979

== Schedule ==
Date	Time	Round
November 3, 2023	20:10	Final

== Results ==
All times shown are in seconds.

KEY:	q	Fastest non-qualifiers	Q	Qualified	NR	National record	PB	Personal best	SB	Seasonal best	DQ	Disqualified

=== Final ===
The results were as follows:

Rank	Name	Nationality	Time	Notes
1st place, gold medalist(s)	Joselyn Brea	Venezuela	4:11.80	
2nd place, silver medalist(s)	Daily Cooper	Cuba	4:11.86	
3rd place, bronze medalist(s)	Emily Mackay	United States	4:12.02	
4	Alma Cortes	Mexico	4:14.44 (.438)	
5	Anita Poma	Peru	4:14.44 (.440)	PB
6	María Pía Fernández	Uruguay	4:15.20	
7	Kate Current	Canada	4:16.65	
8	Josefa Quezada	Chile	4:18.92	
9	Anahi Álvarez	Mexico	4:20.52	PB
10	Mariana Borelli	Argentina	4:28.37	
