= Freweyni Hailu =

Ethiopian athlete

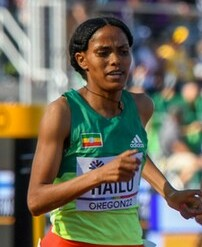
- Hailu competing at the 2022 World Championships

Personal information
- Full name: Freweyni Hailu Gebreezibeher
- Nationality: Ethiopian
- Born: 12 February 2001 (age 25) Werie Lehe, Tigray Region, Ethiopia

Sport
- Country: Ethiopia
- Sport: Athletics
- Event: Middle-distance running

Achievements and titles
- Personal bests: 800 m: 1:57.57 (Chorzów 2021); 1500 m: 3:55.68 (Eugene 2023); 2000 m: 5:25.86 NR Zagreb 2021); 3000m: 8:19.98 (Liévin, 2025); 5000m: 14:18.94 (Rome, 2026); Indoors; 800 m: 2:00.46 (Karlsruhe 2023); 1500 m: 3:55.28 (Toruń 2024)
Medal record
Women's athletics
Representing Ethiopia
Diamond League
First place	2026	5000 m
World Indoor Championships
Gold medal – first place	2024 Glasgow	1500 m
Gold medal – first place	2025 Nanjing	3000 m
Silver medal – second place	2022 Belgrade	800 m
World Road Running Championships
Silver medal – second place	2026 Copenhagen	Mile
Silver medal – second place	2023 Riga	1 mile

Freweyni Hailu (born 12 February 2001) is an Ethiopian middle-distance runner. She won the gold medal at the 2024 World Athletics Indoor Championships over 1500 metres, and the gold medal at the 2025 World Athletics Indoor Championships over 3000 metres.

She placed fifth in the 1500 metres at the 2020 Tokyo Olympics. In 2022, Freweyni became the World Indoor silver medallist at the 800 metres in Belgrade.

== Biography ==
=== Early career ===
Freweyni Hailu gained her first international experience in 2018 at the World Junior Championships in Tampere, Finland, where she placed fifth in the women's 800m event. The next year, she was fourth in the under-20 800m race at the African U18–U20 Championships in Abidjan, Ivory Coast. Freweyni competed in the women's 800 metres at the 2019 African Games, where she was eliminated in the semi-finals.

=== 2021: Olympic Games fourth place finish ===
In June 2021, at the Ethiopian Olympic trials, she ran a personal best in the women's 1500 metres to make the Olympic standard qualifying time for the delayed 2020 Tokyo Olympics. She, Lemlem Hailu, and Diribe Welteji were named to the Ethiopian team. At the Games, she finished in fourth place in a time of 3:57.60 behind only, 1–3, Faith Kipyegon, Laura Muir and Sifan Hassan.

On 14 September 2021, at the Hanžeković Memorial in Zagreb, Freweyni set an Ethiopian record for the 2000 metres with a time of 5m 25.86s, finishing behind only Francine Niyonsaba who set in this race a world record of 5:21.56. Freweyni's mark was the third-fastest in history.

=== 2022:World Indoor silver medalist ===
In March 2022, Freweyni won the silver medal in the 800m at the World Indoor Championships in Belgrade with a personal best time of 2:00.54. Ajeé Wilson came first in 1:59.09, and Halimah Nakaayi was third (2:00.66). It was the first global medal at the indoor 800m for the Ethiopian women in history.

Freweyni placed fourth over 1500 metres at the 2022 World Athletics Championships in Eugene, Oregon in July 2022, running 4:01.28 behind Kipyegon, Muir, and compatriot Gudaf Tsegay.

=== 2023: World Mile silver medalist ===
In 2023, she ran a number of personal best times. Including 3:55.68 in the 1500m at the Diamond League final in Eugene, 8:26.61 in the 3000 metres in Chorzow, and 14:23.45 in the 5000 metres in Paris. She finished seventh in the 5000m at the 2023 World Athletics Championships in Budapest in 14:58.31.

In October, she was runner-up in the mile run at the 2023 World Athletics Road Running Championships in Riga, Latvia, finishing behind her world record setting compatriot Diribe Welteji, running 4:23.06 for second place ahead of Faith Kipyegon.

=== 2024: World Indoor Champion over 1500 metres ===
In January 2024, competing in Ostrava, she won the women's mile setting a meeting record and a world leading time of 4:17.36. The time placed her sixth in the women's mile short track all-time rankings. At the 2024 Copernicus Cup in February 2024, she set a new 1500m personal best, running 3:55.28. She won the gold medal in the final of the women's 1500 metres race at the 2024 World Athletics Indoor Championships in Glasgow.

In May 2024, she led from the front to win the 1500 metres at the 2024 Doha Diamond League. Later that summer, she placed second behind Kipyegon in the 1500 metres at the 2024 Golden Gala in Rome, and third over 5000 metres at the 2024 Prefontaine Classic.

=== 2025: World Indoor Champion over 3000 metres ===
In February 2025, she won the 3000 metres race at the Czech Indoor Gala in Ostrava with a personal best time of 8:24.17. The following week, she won over 3000 metres in 8:19.98, improving on the world-leading mark she had set in Ostrava nine days prior and moving up to third on the world indoor all-time list, in Liévin on 13 February 2025.

She was awarded a wild card place for the 2025 World Athletics Indoor Championships in Nanjing, China, for her performances on the 2025 World Athletics Indoor Tour. At the championships, she won a gold medal in the women's 3000 metres race for her second World Indoor title.

Competing in the 2025 Grand Slam Track event in Miami in May 2025, she won the 1500 metres and finished third in the 800 metres to win the overall two-race format in the women's short distance category. On 6 June 2025, she ran a personal best 14:19.33 to finish second over 5000 metres at the 2025 Golden Gala in Rome. In September 2025, she was a finalist over 1500 metres at the 2025 World Championships in Tokyo, Japan, placing sixth overall.

=== 2026: Diamond League champion ===
In February 2026, Freweyni went into an early world lead with a time of 8:24.59 for the 3000 metres in Liévin, France, finishing ahead of her compatriot and world U20 champion Aleshign Baweke and Italian Nadia Battocletti. Freweyni was the pre-race favourite for the 3000 metres at the 2026 World Athletics Indoor Championships in Toruń, but fell during the race after being pushed by Jessica Hull who herself had been pushed by the Spaniard Marta Garcia, who was later disqualified. Hailu got to her feet 20 metres behind the pack of runners and ultimately recovered enough to finish sixth.

On 31 May, she won the non-Diamond League 1500m in 3:58.25 at the 2026 Meeting International Mohammed VI d'Athlétisme de Rabat, finishing ahead of compatriot Haregeweyni Kalayu. On 4 June, she lowered her 5000 metres personal best to 14:18.94 finishing third at the 2026 Golden Gala in Rome, and on 10 June won in the Diamond League in Oslo over 3000 metres. On 28 June, she was runner-up over 1500 metres with 3:55.92 behind Georgia Hunter Bell at the 2026 Meeting de Paris. On 23 August, she ran 14:54.62 to place second over 5000 m in the Diamond League at the 2026 Kamila Skolimowska Memorial in Silesia, Poland. At the 2026 Diamond League Final in Brussels on 4 September, Freweyni won the 5000 m title, leading an Ethiopian one-two-three in 14:35.20 ahead of Likina Amebaw and Senayet Getachew. Later that month, she placed fourth over 1500 m at the inaugural World Ultimate Championship in Budapest. Competing in the mile run at the World Athletics Road Running Championships on 19 September 2026, Freweyni finished second in a season's best of 4:24.35.

== Competition record ==
Representing Ethiopia
Year	Competition	Venue	Position	Event	Time
2018	World Junior Championships	Tampere, Finland	5th	800 m	2:02.80
2019	African U18 / U20 Championships, U20 events	Abidjan, Ivory Coast	4th	800 m	2:06.98
2019	African Games	Rabat, Morocco	11th (sf)	800 m	2:05.73
2021	Olympic Games	Tokyo, Japan	4th	1500 m	3:57.60
2022	World Indoor Championships	Belgrade, Serbia	2nd	800 m i	2:00.54 PB
2022	World Championships	Eugene, United States	11th (sf)	800 m	2:00.11
2022	World Championships	Eugene, United States	4th	1500 m	4:01.28
2023	World Championships	Budapest, Hungary	7th	5000 m	14:58.31
2024	World Indoor Championships	Glasgow, United Kingdom	1st	1500 m	4:01.46
2025	World Indoor Championships	Nanjing, China	1st	3000 m	8:37.21
2025	World Championships	Tokyo, Japan	6th	1500 m	3:57.33
2026	World Indoor Championships	Toruń, Poland	6th	3000 m	9:02.41
2026	World Ultimate Championship	Budapest, Hungary	4th	1500 m	3:58.44
2026	World Ultimate Championship	Budapest, Hungary	4th	5000 m	14:32.76
2026	World Road Running Championships	Copenhagen, Denmark	2nd	Road mile	4:24.35

=== Circuit performances ===
Grand Slam Track results
Slam	Race group	Event	Pl.	Time	Prize money
2025 Miami Slam	Short distance	1500 m	1st	4:06.96	US$100,000
2025 Miami Slam	Short distance	800 m	3rd	1:59.84	US$100,000

==== Wins and titles ====
- Diamond League
  - 2021 (1500m): Lausanne Athletissima

== Personal bests ==
- 800 metres – 1:57.57 (Chorzów 2021)
  - 800 metres indoor – 2:00.46 (Karlsruhe 2023)
- 1500 metres – 3:55.68 (Eugene 2023)
  - 1500 metres indoor – 4:02.50 (Toruń 2022)
- Mile run - 4:14.79 (Monaco, 2023)
  - Mile run indoors - 4:17.36 (Ostrava, 2024)
- 2000 metres – 5:25.86 (Zagreb 2021) NR
- 3000 metres - 8:24.17 (Ostrava, 2025)
- 5000 metres - 14:19.33 (Rome, 2025)
