= Athletics at the 2022 Commonwealth Games – Women's 1500 metres =

Women's 1500 metres at the 2022 Commonwealth Games
- Venue: Alexander Stadium
- Dates: 5 August (first round); 7 August (final)
- Competitors: 15 from 11 nations
- Winning time: 4:02.75

Medalists
gold medal	Laura Muir	Scotland
silver medal	Ciara Mageean	Northern Ireland
bronze medal	Abbey Caldwell	Australia

The women's 1500 metres at the 2022 Commonwealth Games, as part of the athletics programme, took place in the Alexander Stadium on 5 and 7 August 2022.

== Records ==
Prior to this competition, the existing world and Games records were as follows:

World record	Genzebe Dibaba (ETH)	3:50.07	Monaco	17 July 2015
Commonwealth record	Faith Kipyegon (KEN)	3:51.07	Monaco	9 July 2021
Games record	Caster Semenya (RSA)	4:00.71	Gold Coast, Australia	10 April 2018

== Schedule ==
The schedule was as follows:

Date	Time	Round
Friday 5 August 2022	11:15	First round
Sunday 7 August 2022	19:20	Final

All times are British Summer Time (UTC+1)

== Results ==
=== First round ===
The first round consisted of two heats. The five fastest competitors per heat (plus four fastest losers) advanced to the final.

Rank	Heat	Name	Result	Notes
1	1	Ciara Mageean (NIR)	4:13.52	Q
2	1	Abbey Caldwell (AUS)	4:13.59	Q
3	1	Edinah Jebitok (KEN)	4:13.84	Q
4	1	Linden Hall (AUS)	4:14.08	Q
5	1	Laura Muir (SCO)	4:14.11	Q
6	1	Melissa Courtney-Bryant (WAL)	4:14.46	q
7	2	Winnie Nanyondo (UGA)	4:16.04	Q
8	2	Katie Snowden (ENG)	4:16.09	Q
9	2	Winny Chebet (KEN)	4:16.11	Q
10	2	Jessica Hull (AUS)	4:16.13	Q
11	2	Lucia Stafford (CAN)	4:16.15	Q
12	2	Jemma Reekie (SCO)	4:16.23	q
13	2	Gayanthika Abeyratne (SRI)	4:16.97	
14	2	Claire Uwitonze (RWA)	4:24.07	PB
15	1	Manqabang Tsibela (LES)	4:40.01	SB

=== Final ===
The medals were determined in the final.

Rank	Name	Result	Notes
1st place, gold medalist(s)	Laura Muir (SCO)	4:02.75	
2nd place, silver medalist(s)	Ciara Mageean (NIR)	4:04.14	SB
3rd place, bronze medalist(s)	Abbey Caldwell (AUS)	4:04.79	
4	Linden Hall (AUS)	4:05.09	
5	Jemma Reekie (SCO)	4:05.33	SB
6	Winnie Nanyondo (UGA)	4:05.68	
7	Katie Snowden (ENG)	4:07.15	
8	Jessica Hull (AUS)	4:07.31	
9	Edinah Jebitok (KEN)	4:08.33	
10	Melissa Courtney-Bryant (WAL)	4:10.86	
11	Lucia Stafford (CAN)	4:13.83	
12	Winny Chebet (KEN)	4:15.48	
