= 2025 World Athletics Indoor Championships – Women's 3000 metres =

Women's 3000 metres at the 2025 World Athletics Indoor Championships
- Venue: Nanjing's Cube at Nanjing Youth Olympic Sports Park
- Location: Nanjing, China
- Dates: 22 March
- Competitors: 12 from 9 nations
- Winning time: 8:37.21

Medalists
gold medal	Freweyni Hailu	Ethiopia
silver medal	Shelby Houlihan	United States
bronze medal	Jessica Hull	Australia

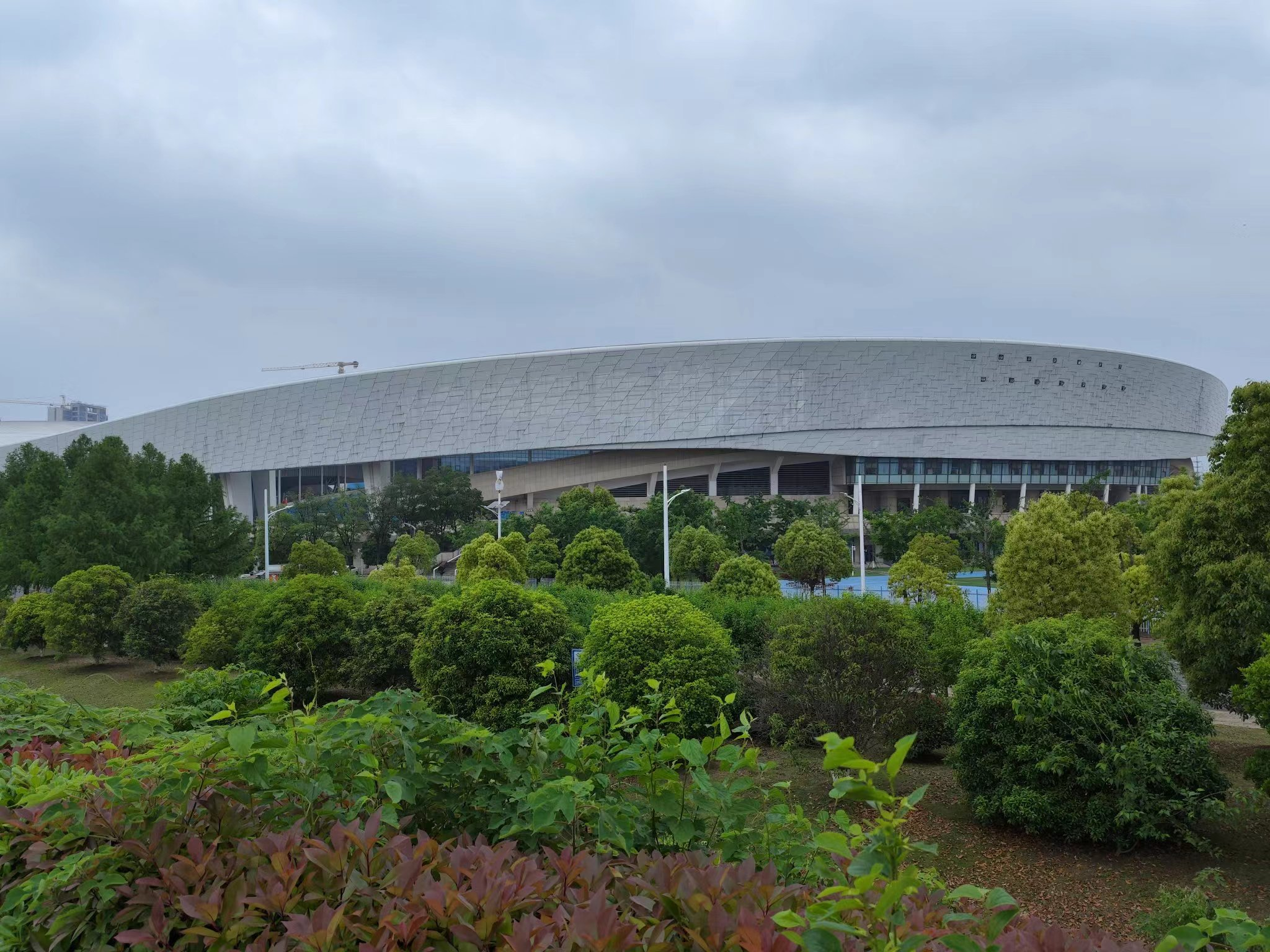
The exterior of the Nanjing Youth Olympic Park, where the event took place

The women's 3000 metres at the 2025 World Athletics Indoor Championships took place on the short track of the Nanjing's Cube at Nanjing Youth Olympic Sports Park in Nanjing, China on 22 March 2025. This was the 21st time the event was contested at the World Athletics Indoor Championships. Athletes qualified by achieving the entry standard or by their World Athletics Ranking in the event.

The final took place on 22 March during the evening session.

== Background ==
The women's 3000 metres was contested 20 times before 2025, at every previous edition of the World Athletics Indoor Championships.

Records before the 2025 World Athletics Indoor Championships
Record	Athlete (nation)	Time (s)	Location	Date
World record	Genzebe Dibaba (ETH)	8:16.60	Stockholm, Sweden	6 February 2014
Championship record	Elle Purrier St. Pierre (USA)	8:20.87	Glasgow, United Kingdom	2 March 2024
World leading	Freweyni Hailu (ETH)	8:19.98	Liévin, France	10 February 2025

== Qualification ==
For the women's 3000 metres, the qualification period ran from 1 September 2024 until 9 March 2025. Athletes qualified by achieving the entry standards of 8:33.00, or 14:25.00 over 5000 metres. Athletes were also able to qualify by virtue of their World Athletics Ranking for the event, or by virtue of their World Athletics Indoor Tour wildcard. There was a target number of 15 athletes.

== Final ==
The final was started on 22 March, starting at 19:15 (UTC+8).

Place	Athlete	Nation	Time	Notes
1st place, gold medalist(s)	Freweyni Hailu	Ethiopia	8:37.21	
2nd place, silver medalist(s)	Shelby Houlihan	United States	8:38.26	
3rd place, bronze medalist(s)	Jessica Hull	Australia	8:38.28	
4	Whittni Morgan	United States	8:39.18	
5	Birke Haylom	Ethiopia	8:39.28	
6	Sarah Healy	Ireland	8:40.00	
7	Marta García	Spain	8:40.80	SB
8	Purity Kajuju Gitonga	Kenya	8:44.56	
9	Linden Hall	Australia	8:44.99	
10	Nozomi Tanaka	Japan	8:47.93	
11	Adva Cohen	Israel	8:59.62	
12	Li Yuan	China	9:14.14	PB
