= 2026 World Athletics Indoor Championships – Women's 3000 metres =

Women's 3000 metres at the 2026 World Athletics Indoor Championships
- Venue: Kujawsko-Pomorska Arena Toruń
- Location: Toruń, Poland
- Dates: 21 March
- Winning time: 8:57.64

Medalists
gold medal	Nadia Battocletti	Italy
silver medal	Emily Mackay	United States
bronze medal	Jessica Hull	Australia

The women's 3000 metres at the 2026 World Athletics Indoor Championships took place on the short track of the Kujawsko-Pomorska Arena Toruń in Toruń, Poland, on 21 March 2026. This was the 22nd time the event was contested at the World Athletics Indoor Championships. Athletes could qualify by achieving the entry standard or by their World Athletics Ranking in the event.

== Background ==
The women's 3000 metres was contested 21 times before 2026, at every previous edition of the World Athletics Indoor Championships.

Records before the 2026 World Athletics Indoor Championships
Record	Athlete (nation)	Time (s)	Location	Date
World record	Genzebe Dibaba (ETH)	8:16.60	Stockholm, Sweden	6 February 2014
Championship record	Elle Purrier St. Pierre (USA)	8:20.87	Glasgow, United Kingdom	2 March 2024
2026 World Lead	Freweyni Hailu (ETH)	8:24.59	Liévin, France	19 February 2026

== Qualification ==
For the women's 3000 metres, the qualification period ran from 1 November 2025 until 8 March 2026. Athletes could qualify by achieving the entry standard of 8:35.00 s. Athletes could also qualify by virtue of their World Athletics Ranking for the event or by virtue of their World Athletics Indoor Tour wildcard. There is a target number of 15 athletes.

== Results ==
=== Final ===
The final was held on 21 March, starting at 19:04 (UTC+1) in the evening.

Place	Athlete	Nation	Time	Notes
1st place, gold medalist(s)	Nadia Battocletti	Italy	8:57.64	
2nd place, silver medalist(s)	Emily Mackay	United States	8:58.12	
3rd place, bronze medalist(s)	Jessica Hull	Australia	8:58.18	
4	Aleshign Baweke	Ethiopia	9:00.26	
5	Şilan Ayyıldız	Turkey	9:02.11	
6	Freweyni Hailu	Ethiopia	9:02.41	
7	Vera Sjöberg	Sweden	9:03.57	
8	Katie Snowden	Great Britain	9:03.79	
9	Hannah Nuttall	Great Britain	9:04.20	
10	Norah Jeruto	Kazakhstan	9:04.22	
11	Micol Majori	Italy	9:04.39	
12	Linden Hall	Australia	9:04.83	
13	Nozomi Tanaka	Japan	9:07.77	
14	Margot Appleton	United States	9:12.57	
	Marta García	Spain	DQ	TR17.1.2
