= Likina Amebaw =

Ethiopian athlete (born 1997)

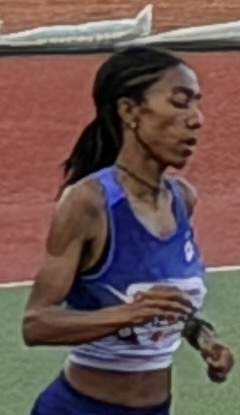

Personal information
- Nationality: Ethiopian
- Born: 30 November 1997 (age 28)

Sport
- Sport: Athletics
- Events: Cross country, Long distance running

Achievements and titles
- Personal bests: 1500 m: 4:00.14 (Budapest, 2025); 3000 m: 8:24.29 (Oslo, 2024); 5000 m: 14:18.41 (Rome, 2026); 10,000 m: 32:33.59 (London, 2023); Road; 5km: 14:23 (Barcelona, 2025); 10 km: 29:30 (Valencia, 2026); Half marathon: 1:04:44 (Copenhagen, 2025)
Medal record
Women's athletics
Representing Ethiopia
World Ultimate Championship
First place	2026 Budapest	5000 m
Diamond League
Second place	2026	5000 m
World Road Running Championships
Gold medal – first place	2026 Copenhagen	5k
Gold medal – first place	2026 Copenhagen	5k mixed team

Likina Amebaw (born 30 November 1997) is an Ethiopian long-distance runner. In 2026, she won the 5000 metres title at the inaugural World Ultimate Championship.

== Biography ==
In April 2021, she won the cross country at the Almond Blossom Cross Country in Albufeira. She won again in Albufeira in February 2023.

In October 2023, she won the first Gold event of that season's World Athletics Cross Country Tour, claiming victory at the Cross Zornotza in Amorebieta, Spain.

In November 2023, she won the Cross Internacional de Soria, a Gold level meeting on the World Athletics Cross Country Tour, in Soria, Spain. In January 2024, she placed second at the San Silvestre Vallecana, a World Athletics Elite Label road race, in Spain. In April 2024, she ran a personal best time of 29:56 to win the Paris for the Festival of Running 10 km road race.

She finished fifth in the 5000 metres at the Diamond League event the 2024 Meeting International Mohammed VI d'Athlétisme in Morocco in May 2024. At the end of the month, she finished second in the 3000 metres at the 2024 Bislett Games in Oslo in 8:24.29.

In February 2025, she won the 5 km Monaco Run in a time of 14:33. She ran a personal best of 14:30.54 for the 5000 metres at the 2025 Xiamen Diamond League event in China, in April 2025. She was second over 3000 metres at the 2025 Kamila Skolimowska Memorial, part of the 2025 Diamond League, in Poland, with a run of 8:34.53 to finish runner-up to Faith Kipyegon. She was then runner-up over 5000 metres to Agnes Ngetich in the Diamond League at the 2025 Memorial Van Damme in Brussels, Belgium. She placed third over 3000 metres at the Diamond League Final in Zurich on 28 August.

Likina placed second overall in the 2025-26 World Athletics Cross Country Tour standings. Her performances included placing third at the Cross Internacional de Itálica in Spain, in November 2025, finishing behind Winfred Yavi and Daisy Jepkemei. The following week she won the Cross Internacional de Soria in Spain. On 31 December, Likina moved to fifth on the all-time list with the world's second-quickest performance of 2025, winning the 5 km Cursa dels Nassos, a World Athletics Label event, held in Barcelona, in 14:23. On 11 January 2026, she moved to sixth on the world all-time list for 10 km, with her time of 29:30 in finishing second to Brenda Jepchirchir, in Valencia. She won the 2026 Berlin Half Marathon on 29 March in 65:07.

In May, Likina was second to Faith Kipyegon in a personal best of 14:24.21 for the 5000 metres at the 2026 Shanghai Diamond League. On 4 June, she lowered it again, winning in 14:18.41 at the 2026 Golden Gala in Rome. On 10 June, she was runner-up over 3000 m in the Diamond League in Oslo. On 19 June, she ran 14:54.37 to finish a close second to Medina Eisa in the 5000 metres at the 2026 Doha Diamond League. At the 2026 Diamond League Final in Brussels on 4 September, she placed second in the 5000 metres, finishing part of an Ethiopian one-two-three behind Freweyni Hailu and ahead of Senayet Getachew. On 13 September, Likina won the 5000 metres title at the inaugural World Ultimate Championship, in Budapest, dominating the later stages of the race to win by a comfortable margin, setting a Hungarian all-comers' record of 14:30.36. The following weekend, she competed in the 5k at the World Athletics Road Running Championships on 19 September 2026 in Copenhagen, winning the gold medal ahead of Caroline Gitonga of Kenya. She also won the team mixed gold alongside Aleshign Baweke, Addisu Yihune and Mezgebu Sime. The following month, she once again won the Cross Zornotza in Amorebieta. In November, she won the Cross Internacional de Itálica in Seville.

== Personal life ==
Based in Peguerinos in Spain, she is a member of Playas de Castellón Athletics Club. In 2024, she was in the process of obtaining Spanish citizenship.
