= Dorcus Ewoi =

Kenyan middle-distance runner (born 1996)

Personal information
- Born: October 2, 1996 (age 29) Kitale, Kenya
- Education: St. Francis Girls High School; South Plains College; Campbell University

Sport
- Country: Kenya
- Sport: Sport of athletics
- Event(s): 800 metres 1500 metres
- College team: South Plains Texans; Campbell Fighting Camels
- Club: Puma Elite Running Team

Achievements and titles
- National finals: 2023 NCAAs; • 800m, 5th
- Personal bests: 800 m: 1:58.19 (2024); 1500 m: 3:54.92 (2025)
Medal record
Women's athletics
Representing Kenya
World Championships
Silver medal – second place	2025 Tokyo	1500 m
- Updated on September 2025

Dorcus Ewoi (born October 2, 1996), also spelled Dorcas Ewoi, is a Kenyan middle-distance runner based in the United States and specializing in the 800 metres. She finished 5th at the 2023 NCAA Division I Outdoor Track and Field Championships before turning pro with Puma. In 2024, she defeated Olympic gold medallist Athing Mu to win the Holloway Pro Classic 2024 World Athletics Continental Tour Silver meeting. In 2025, at Tokyo - she finished 2nd in World Athletics Championship

== Career ==
Ewoi initially ran for the South Plains Lady Texans track and field team in the NJCAA from 2018 to 2020. She won the 2019 NJCAA Division I indoor championships in the mile run and the outdoor championships in the 1500 m. Before the COVID-19 pandemic suspended American college athletics, she repeated as NJCAA indoor mile champion in 2020.

After transferring to the Campbell Fighting Camels track and field program, Ewoi qualified for the 2022 and 2023 NCAA Division I Outdoor Track and Field Championships in the 800 m. At the 2022 edition, she ran 2:03.17 in her semifinal and did not advance to the finals. At the 2023 championships, Ewoi advanced to the finals and placed 5th with a 2:02.13 clocking, advancing from the chase pack in the final stretch.

In 2024, Ewoi signed as a professional with the Puma Elite Running club and improved her 800 m best from 2:01.12 to 1:58.19. She won the 2024 Penn Relays Olympic Development 800 m and beat the reigning Olympic gold medalist Athing Mu to win the Holloway Pro Classic in Florida in July 2024.

== Personal life ==
Ewoi is one of 9 siblings born in Kitale, Kenya, where she attended St. Francis Girls High School. Her relatives are Turkana people from Northern Kenya. At Campbell University, she intended to major in clinical research. Ewoi is Christian.

== Statistics ==
=== Personal best progression ===
800m progression
#	Mark	Pl.	Competition	Venue	Date	Ref.
1	2:14.25A	1st place, gold medalist(s)	NMJC Ross Black Open	Hobbs, NM	12 Apr 2019	
2	2:14.21	1st place, gold medalist(s)	Red Raider Invitational	Lubbock, TX	23 Jan 2020	
3	2:11.60	1st place, gold medalist(s)	CCU Chanticleer Challenge	Conway, SC	2 Apr 2021	
4	2:08.57	2nd place, silver medalist(s)	Big South Outdoor Track & Field Championships	High Point, NC	11 May 2021	
5	2:08.19	(gold) (Round C)	Raleigh Relays	Raleigh, NC	25 Mar 2022	
6	2:04.49	3rd place, bronze medalist(s)	Florida Collegiate Invitational	Jacksonville, FL	29 Apr 2022	
7	2:04.08	4th (Qualification 1)	NCAA East Preliminary Round	Bloomington, IN	27 May 2022	
8	2:03.17	5th (Semifinal 3)	NCAA Championships	Eugene, OR	8 Jun 2022	
9	2:01.12	(bronze) (Semifinal 3)	NCAA Outdoor Championships	Austin, TX	7 Jun 2023	
10	1:58.58	2nd place, silver medalist(s)	The Adrian Martinez Classic	Concord, MA	7 Jun 2024	
11	1:58.19	1st place, gold medalist(s)	Holloway Pro Classic	Gainesville, FL	18 Jul 2024	
