= Linden Hall (athlete) =

Australian sprinter

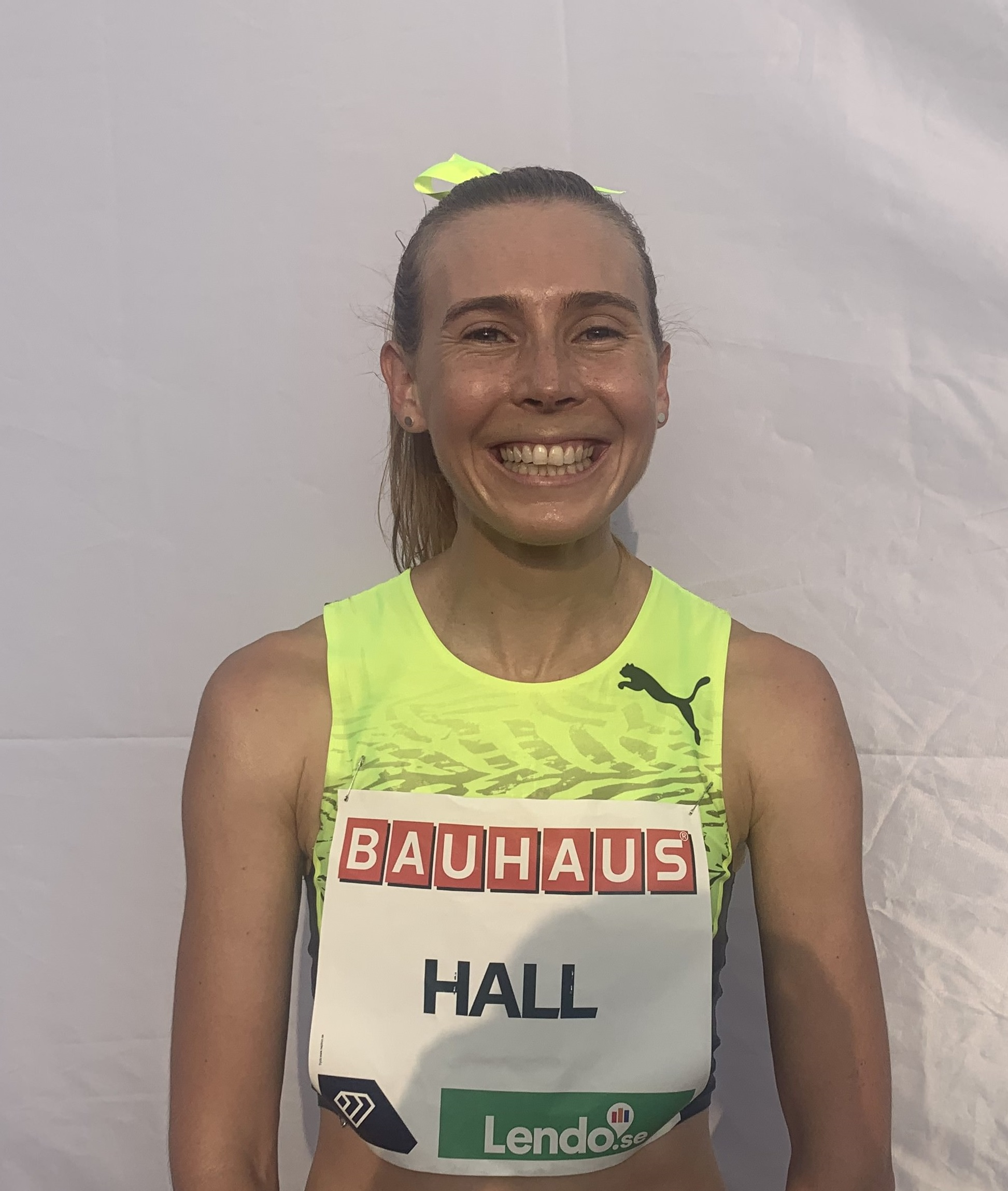
- Linden Hall in Stockholm Diamond league (2022)

Personal information
- Born: 20 June 1991 (age 35) Sunbury, Victoria, Australia
- Education: Penleigh and Essendon Grammar School, Florida State University; Monash University
- Height: 1.67 m (5 ft 6 in)
- Weight: 51 kg (112 lb)

Sport
- Sport: Athletics
- Event: 1500 m
- College team: Florida State Seminoles
- Club: Athletics Essendon
Medal record
Men's athletics
Representing Australia
World Cross Country Championships
Gold medal – first place	2026 Tallahassee	Mixed relay
World Road Running Championships
Silver medal – second place	2026 Copenhagen	Mile mixed team

Linden Hall (born 20 June 1991) is an Australian track and field middle-distance runner.

== Early years ==
Hall started running while in primary school in Victoria. While still in Grade 6, she came 11th in her first national championships in cross country. She also played netball and was a strong swimmer. However, she gave these away when she joined Essendon Athletics club and commenced regular athletics training with a coach.

After high school, from 2011 to 2015, Hall went to the US where she studied Dietetics at Florida State University. During her college athletics career, she ran in three National Collegiate Athletic Association (NCAA) 1500m finals and won bronze in 2014.

== Career ==
In 2016, Hall set a new PB of 4:04.47 in Palo Alto qualifying her for the Olympics. She was selected for the team and represented Australia in the 1500 metres. She came 4th in her heat to qualify for the semifinal. In the semifinal she finished in 8th and did not advance to the final.

Hall competed at the 2018 Commonwealth Games in the 1500 Metres, finishing in fourth and narrowly missing out on a medal.

She also competed at the 2019 World Championships, making it to the semi-finals where she finished 10th, so did not advance to the final.

In 2021, Hall ran under the 4-minute barrier for 1500 metres for the first time clocking a time of 3:59.67, becoming the first Australian woman to achieve this. At the 2020 Tokyo Olympics, Hall came third in both her heat and semi-final of the Women's 1500m, each time improving her time. She thus made the final of the 1500m, where she finished in 6th position with a personal best time of 3:59.01.

Hall is a two time Australian national champion in the 1500m: in 2018 and 2021. She has set new Oceanian records for 1500m at least twice, the last occasion on 16 September 2023 at the Prefontaine Classic Diamond League meet with 3.56.92 (beating her previous record of 3:57.27 set 2 months previously) She won a Diamond League 1500m race on 30 June 2022 at the Bauhaus-Galan in Stockholm; and in June 2025 won the again at the Bauhaus-Galan Diamond League meet, this time in the 3,000m in a new pb.

== Personal bests ==
Distance	Time	Date	Location	Notes
800 metres	1:59.22	27 March 2021	Brisbane, Australia	
1000 metres	2:35.12	4 August 2023	Bern, Switzerland	then NR
1500 metres	3:56.33	22 August 2025	King Baudouin Stadium, Brussels, Belgium	then #2 Australia all-time (#3 4 June 2026)
1500 metres short track	4:05.06	1 February 2026	New York, USA	#4 Australia all-time*
Mile	4:19.58	19 July 2025	London, UK	#2 Australia all-time*
Mile short track	4:21.45	1 February 2026	New York, USA	#2 Australia all-time*
3000 metres	8.30.01	15 June 2025	Stockholm, Sweden	#3 Australia all-time*
3000 metres short track	8:27.03	24 January 2026	Boston, USA	#2 Australia all-time*
5000 metres	14.40.81	4 June 2026	Rome, Italy	#4 Australia all-time*
5000 metres short track	14:58.43	15 February 2025	Boston, United States	NR*

- as at 4 June 2026

== International competitions ==
Year	Competition	Venue	Position	Event	Notes
2016	Olympic Games	Rio de Janeiro, Brazil	13th	1500 m	4:11.75 (H); 4:05.81 (SF)
2017	World Championships	London, United Kingdom	33rd (h)	1500 m	4:10.51
2018	Commonwealth Games	Gold Coast, Australia	4th	1500 m	4:03.67
2019	World Championships	Doha, Qatar	10th (sf)	1500 m	4:06.39
2021	Olympic Games	Tokyo, Japan	6th	1500 m	3:59.01
2022	World Indoor Championships	Belgrade, Serbia	6th	1500 m	4:06.34
2022	World Championships	Eugene, United States	12th (sf)	1500 m	4:04.65
2022	Commonwealth Games	Birmingham, United Kingdom	4th	1500 m	4:05.09
2023	World Championships	Budapest, Hungary	19th (sf)	1500 m	4:03.96
2024	World Indoor Championships	Glasgow, United Kingdom	7th (h)	1500 m	4:09.83
2024	Olympic Games	Paris, France	18th (rep)	1500 m	4:09.05
2025	World Indoor Championships	Nanjing, China	9th	3000 m	8:44.99
2025	World Championships	Tokyo, Japan	7th (sf)	1500 m	4:01.65
2025	World Championships	Tokyo, Japan	11th	5000 m	15:04.03
2026	World Cross Country Championships	Tallahassee, USA	1st	Mixed Relay	
2026	World Indoor Championships	Toruń, Poland	12th	3000 m	9:04.83
2026	Commonwealth Games	Glasgow, Scotland	7th	5000 m	14:55.28
2026	World Road Running Championships	Copenhagen, Denmark	7th	Road mile	4:29.36
