= Jessica Hull =

Australian runner (born 1996)

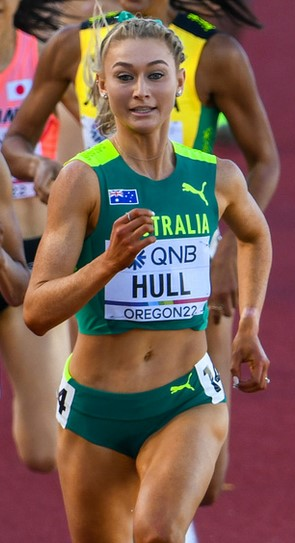
- Hull at the 2022 World Athletics Championships

Personal information
- Born: Jessica Hull; 22 October 1996 (age 30) Wollongong, New South Wales, Australia
- Height: 1.65 m (5 ft 5 in)

Sport
- Country: Australia
- Sport: Track and field
- Events: 1500 metres, Mile, 5000 metres
- College team: Oregon Ducks
- Club: Bankstown Sports AC
- Turned pro: June 2019

Achievements and titles
- Olympic finals: 1500 m; 2020 Tokyo, 11th; 2024 Paris, Silver
- World finals: 1500 m; 2019 Doha, sf (13th); 2022 Eugene, 7th; 2023 Budapest, 7th; 2025 Tokyo, 3rd
- Personal bests: 800 m: 1:57.15 AR (Tokyo 2025); 1000 m: 2:30.96 AR (Monaco 2025); 1500 m: 3:50.83 AR (Paris 2024); Mile: 4:13.68 AR (London 2025); 2000 m: 5:19.70 WR (Monaco 2024); 3000 m: 8:24.39i AR (Glasgow 2024); 5000 m: 14:32.39 (Budapest 2026); Indoors; 1500 m: 3:59.45 AR (Toruń 2026); 2000 m: 5:26.68 AR (Liévin 2026); Mile: 4:19.03 AR (New York 2024); 3000 m: 8:24.39 AR (Glasgow 2024)
Medal record
Women's athletics
Representing Australia
Olympic Games
Silver medal – second place	2024 Paris	1500 m
World Championships
Bronze medal – third place	2025 Tokyo	1500 m
World Indoor Championships
Silver medal – second place	2026 Toruń	1500 m
Bronze medal – third place	2025 Nanjing	3000 m
Bronze medal – third place	2026 Toruń	3000 m
World Cross Country Championships
Gold medal – first place	2026 Tallahassee	Mixed relay
Bronze medal – third place	2023 Bathurst	Mixed relay

Jessica Hull (born 22 October 1996) is an Australian middle- and long-distance runner. In the 1500 m, she won the silver medal at the 2024 Paris Olympics and the bronze medal at the 2025 World Athletics Championships. Hull holds Oceanian records in the 800 m, 1000 m, 1500 m, mile, and 3000 m, as well as the short-track (indoor) records for the mile and 3000 m. Hull is the fifth-fastest woman in history over 1500 m and holds the world record in the seldom-run 2000 m. She won bronze medals in the 3000 m at the 2025 World Indoor Championships and in the mixed relay at the 2023 World Cross Country Championships. Hull won a gold medal at the 2026 World Athletics Cross Country Championships in the mixed relay. Hull is a six-time Australian national champion, having won three titles each in the 1500 m and 5000 m. A graduate of the University of Oregon, Hull was a two-time individual NCAA Division I champion and has run professionally for Nike since 2019.

== Career ==
=== Early years ===
Hull was born in Wollongong. She grew up in Albion Park and began running cross-country and athletics carnivals at school aged eight. She also played soccer until the age of fourteen. Her training was initially guided by her father, Simon, who had been a national level middle-distance runner.

=== Junior representation ===
Hull won the under-17 1500 metres at the 2012 Australian Athletics Championships with a time of 4:28.11. The 17-year-old made her international debut at the 2014 World U20 Championships held in Eugene, Oregon, where she finished seventh in the 3000 metres in a personal best time of 9:08.85.

Hull won the 1500 m at the 2015 Australian Junior Championships, when she also finished third in the 800 m. She placed 69th in the women's junior race at the World Cross Country Championships that year with a time of 23:11.

=== College years ===
After high school, Hull went to the United States where she studied at University of Oregon, completing a degree in human physiology. As a student-athlete, she represented the Oregon Ducks. She was coached by Maurica Powell for three years and Helen Lehman-Winters in her senior year.

Hull was the NCAA Division I indoor 3000 m bronze medallist in 2018, and over the next two years, added six podium finishes on the indoor and outdoor track and in cross country, including four collegiate titles. She was the individual NCAA champion in the 1500 m in 2018 and in the indoor 3000 m in 2019, earning seven All-American honors.

=== Early professional years ===
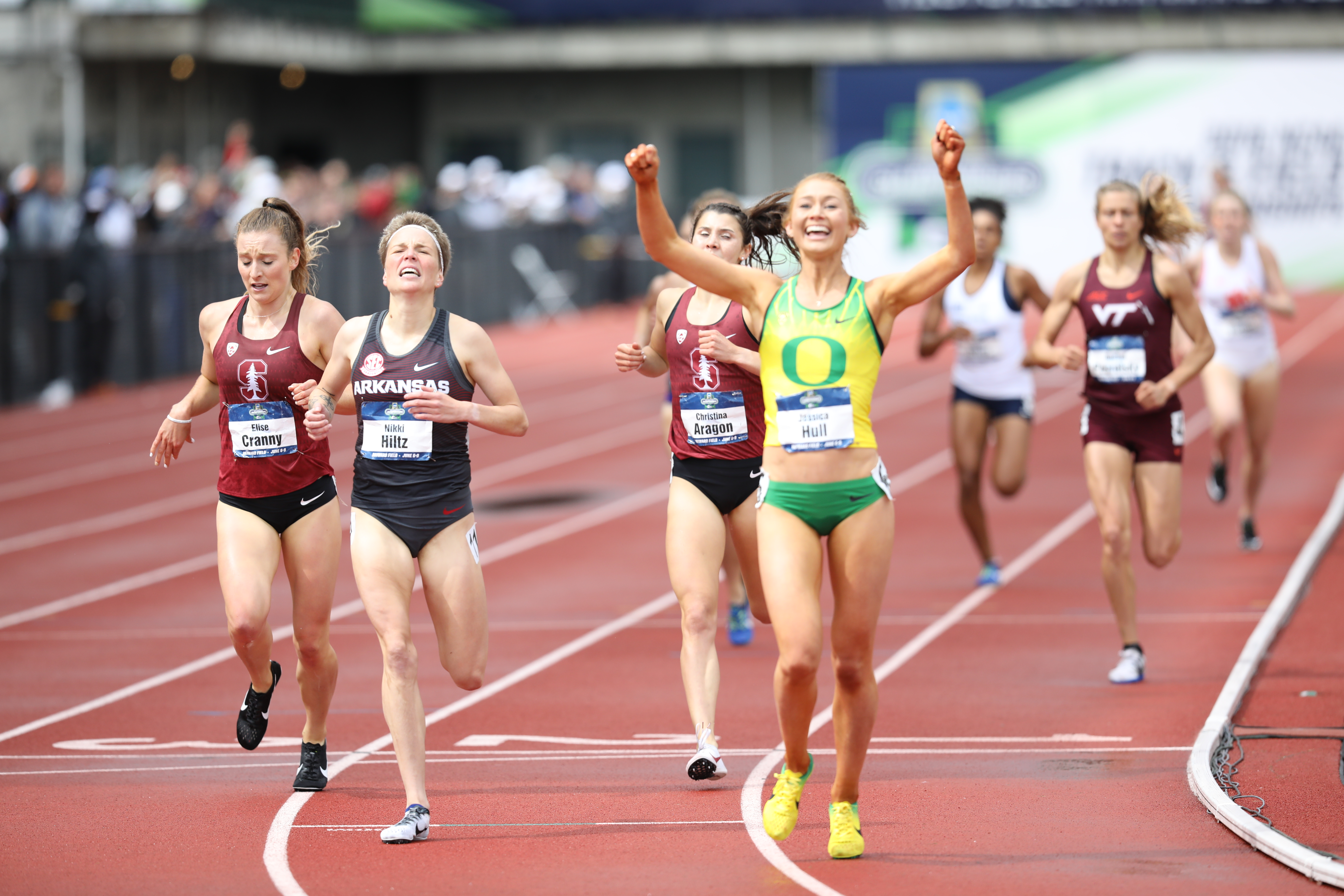
Hull wins the 1500 metres at the 2018 NCAA Championships.

In July 2019, Hull signed with Nike and joined the now-defunct Nike Oregon Project. In her senior international debut at the 2019 World Athletics Championships hosted in Doha, Qatar, she narrowly missed the 1500 m final. Her personal best time of 4:01.80 was the fastest non-qualifying time for the final ever at a world championships or Olympics.

In January 2020, she set an Oceanian indoor 1500 m record at the New Balance Indoor Grand Prix meet in Boston, winning the event with a time of 4:04.14. Later that year, she broke 18-year-old Australian national 5000 m record at Monaco Diamond League, finishing fourth in a time of 14:43.80.

In August 2021, Hull reached the final of the 1500 m event at the postponed Tokyo Olympics, which she set an Oceanian record time of 3:58.81, coming in fourth place in the semi-final. Two days later, she placed 11th in the final in a time of 4:02.63. In February 2023, at the World Athletics Cross Country Championships held in Australia, Hull competed in the mixed relay with teammates Oliver Hoare, Stewart McSweyn and Abbey Caldwell. On her leg, she took the lead, and ultimately Australia finished with a bronze.

=== Medals and record-breaking spree ===
In July 2023, Hull ran a mile in 4:15.34, which took almost three seconds off the Australian and Oceanian women's mile records, and was eighth-fastest time ever in the women's mile.

On 7 July 2024, Hull improved on her own Oceanian record in the 1500 metres to 3:50.83 at the Meeting de Paris; this time moved her up to 5th on the all-time top list. Later that month, at the Herculis Meeting in Monaco, Hull competed in the 2000 metres, running 5:19.70 to break the previous world record held by Burundi's Francine Niyonsaba, who ran 5:21.56 in 2021.

At the 2024 Paris Olympics, Hull won a silver medal in the 1500 m, running 3:52.56 behind Faith Kipyegon.

In October 2024, it was announced that Hull had signed up for the inaugural season of the Michael Johnson founded Grand Slam Track. She made her Grand Slam Track and 2025 outdoor debuts in the 800 m at the inaugural Grand Slam Meet in Kingston, Jamaica on 4 April, finishing third in a new personal best of 1:58.58 seconds.

On 1 February 2026, Hull finished second in the Wanamaker Mile of the 2026 Millrose Games, with a time of 4:20.11.

== Personal life ==
In December 2022, Hull married Daniel Jolliffe.

== Statistics ==
=== International competitions ===
Representing Australia
Year	Competition	Venue	Position	Event	Result	Notes
2014	World Junior Championships	Eugene, United States	7th	3000 m	9:08.85	PB
2015	World Cross Country Championships	Guiyang, China	69th	U20 race	23:11	
2015	World Cross Country Championships	Guiyang, China	12th	U20 team	232 pts	
2019	World Championships	Doha, Qatar	8th (sf)	1500 m	4:01.80	PB
2021	Olympic Games	Tokyo, Japan	11th	1500 m	4:02.63	(sf: 3:58.81 AR)
2022	World Indoor Championships	Belgrade, Serbia	6th	3000 m i	8:44.97	
2022	World Championships	Eugene, OR, United States	7th	1500 m	4:01.82	
2022	Commonwealth Games	Birmingham, United Kingdom	8th	1500 m	4:07.31	
2023	World Cross Country Championships	Bathurst, Australia	3rd	Mixed relay	23:26	
2023	World Championships	Budapest, Hungary	26th (h)	5000 m	15:15.89	
2024	World Indoor Championships	Glasgow, United Kingdom	4th	3000 m	8:24.39	PB AR
2024	Wanda Diamond League	Paris, France	2nd	1500 m	3:50.83	PB AR
2024	Wanda Diamond League	Fontvieille, Monaco	1st	2000 m	5:19.70	PB WR
2024	Olympic Games	Paris, France	2nd	1500 m	3:52.56	
2025	World Indoor Championships	Nanjing, China	3rd	3000 m	8:38.28	
2025	World Championships	Tokyo, Japan	8th	800 m	1:57.30	
2025	World Championships	Tokyo, Japan	3rd	1500 m	3:55.16	
2026	World Cross Country Championships	Tallahassee, USA	1st	Mixed Relay		
2026	World Indoor Championships	Toruń, Poland	2nd	1500 m	3.59.45	PB AR
2026	World Indoor Championships	Toruń, Poland	3rd	3000 m	8:58.18	
2026	Commonwealth Games	Glasgow, United Kingdom	2nd	Mile	4:39.86	
2026	Commonwealth Games	Glasgow, United Kingdom	2nd	5000 m	14:45.01	
2026	World Ultimate Championship	Budapest, Hungary	9th	1500 m	3:59.97	
2026	World Ultimate Championship	Budapest, Hungary	2nd	5000 m	14:32.39	PB

=== Circuit performances ===
Grand Slam Track results
Slam	Race group	Event	Pl.	Time	Prize money
2025 Kingston Slam	Short distance	800 m	3rd	1:58.58	US$25,000
2025 Kingston Slam	Short distance	1500 m	4th	4:05.48	US$25,000
2025 Miami Slam	Short distance	1500 m	4th	4:07.67	US$20,000
2025 Miami Slam	Short distance	800 m	5th	2:00.88	US$20,000
2025 Philadelphia Slam	Short distance	1500 m	2nd	3:58.36	US$50,000
2025 Philadelphia Slam	Short distance	800 m	3rd	1:59.63	US$50,000

=== National titles ===
- Australian Athletics Championships
  - 1500 metres: 2023, 2024, 2025
  - 5000 metres: 2020, 2022, 2023, 2025

=== NCAA championships ===
Year	Competition	Venue	Position	Event	Time
Representing Oregon Ducks
2016	NCAA Division I Cross Country Championships	Terre Haute, Indiana	79th	6000 m	20:44.3
2017	NCAA Division I Championships	Eugene, Oregon	39th	1500 m	4:29.75
2017	NCAA Division I Cross Country Championship	Louisville, Kentucky	93rd	Cross country	20:39.5
2018	NCAA Division I Indoor Championships	College Station, Texas	3rd	3000 m	9:01.96
2018	NCAA Division I Indoor Championships	College Station, Texas	1st	Distance medley relay	10:51.99
2018	NCAA Division I Championships	Eugene, Oregon	1st	1500 m	4:08.75
2018	NCAA Division I Cross Country Championship	Madison, Wisconsin	3rd	Cross country	19:50.4
2019	NCAA Division I Indoor Championships	Birmingham, Alabama	1st	3000 m	9:01.14
2019	NCAA Division I Indoor Championships	Birmingham, Alabama	1st	Distance medley relay	10:53.43
2019	NCAA Division I Championships	Austin, Texas	2nd	1500 m	4:06.27
