= Emily Mackay =

American runner (born 1998)

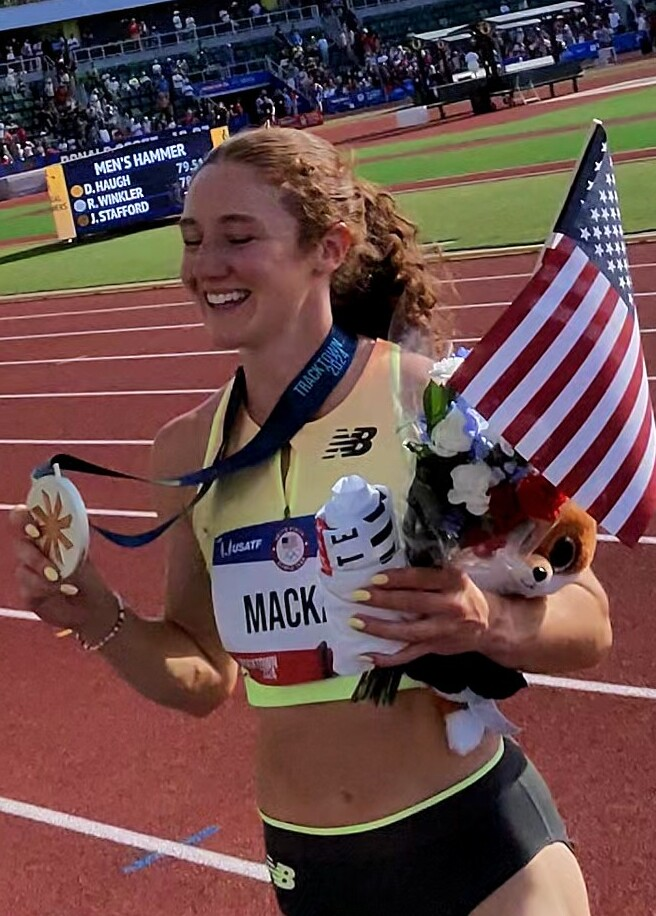
- Mackay in 2024

Personal information
- Born: April 30, 1998 (age 28) Endicott, New York U.S.
- Education: Union-Endicott High School '16; Oregon State University '17; Binghamton University '20 '22
- Height: 5 ft 8 in (173 cm)

Sport
- Country: United States
- Sport: Women's athletics
- Events: 1500 m, 800 m, 5000 m
- College team: Binghamton Bearcats
- Turned pro: 2022

Achievements and titles
- Highest world ranking: 13th
- Personal bests: 800 m: 1:57.87; 1500 m: 3:55.90; Mile: 4:18.18; 3000 m: 8:30.01; 5000 m: 14:45.81; 6000 m cross country: 20:08.4
Medal record
Women's athletics
Representing United States
World Indoor Championships
Silver medal – second place	2026 Toruń	3000 m
Bronze medal – third place	2024 Glasgow	1500 m
NACAC Championships
Gold medal – first place	2025 Freeport	1500 m
Pan American Games
Bronze medal – third place	2023 Santiago	1500 m

Emily Mackay (/məˈkaɪ/ mə-KYE; born April 30, 1998) is an American middle- and long-distance runner. She is an Olympian and two-time World Athletics Indoor Championship medalist. She is also currently the third-fastest all-time American woman in the 1500 meters.

== Prep and personal life ==
Emily Mackay placed 2nd in the 1500m at the 2015 New Balance Indoor Nationals after placing 2nd in the 1500m in 4:25.32 at New York State Public High School Athletic Association/NYSPHSAA Outdoor State Championship as a junior. Mackay won 2014 New York State HS Indoor Championships 1500m in 4:49.76 as a sophomore at Union-Endicott High School.

== NCAA ==
Mackay graduated from Binghamton University as a 5-time NCAA Division I All-American with an undergrad in Psychology and an MBA in 2022. Mackay trains with Team New Balance Boston.

Mackay won 7 America East Conference individual titles.

== Professional career ==
Mackay won a bronze medal in the 1500 meters at the 2023 Pan American Games, bronze medal in the Women's 1500 meters at the 2024 World Indoor Championships held in Glasgow, UK, and a silver medal in the Women's 5000 meters at the 2026 World Indoor Championships held in Toruń, Poland.

Mackay signed a contract with New Balance in 2022.

At the 2024 Adrian Martinez Classic, Mackay ran 1:57.87 in the 800m, the first time she ran the event under 2 minutes.

At the 2024 USA Olympic Track and Field Trials, held in Eugene, OR on June 30, 2024, Mackay ran a personal record 3:55.90 to place second in the 1500m and make her first Olympic team.

== Statistics ==
=== Circuit performances ===
Grand Slam Track results
Slam	Race group	Event	Pl.	Time	Prize money
2025 Miami Slam	Short distance	1500 m	5th	4:10.93	US$15,000
2025 Miami Slam	Short distance	800 m	7th	2:02.42	US$15,000

=== International competitions ===
Year	Competition	Venue	Position	Event	Time
2026	World Athletics Indoor Championships	Toruń, Poland	2nd	3000m	8:58.12
2025	NACAC Championships	Freeport, The Bahamas	1st	1500m	4:09.48
2025	World Athletics Outdoor Championships	Tokyo, Japan	19th	1500m	4:12.80
2024	World Athletics Indoor Championships	Glasgow, United Kingdom	3rd	1500m	4:02.69
2024	Olympic Games	Paris, France	14th	1500m	4:02.02
2023	Pan American Games	Santiago, Chile	3rd	1500m	4:12.02

=== National championships ===
Year	Competition	Venue	Position	Event	Time
2026	USATF Indoor Championships	Staten Island, New York	1st	3000m	8:30.01
2026	USATF Outdoor Championships	New York City, New York	3rd	1500m	4:06.98
2026	USATF Outdoor Championships	New York City, New York	1st	5000m	14:55.82
2025	USATF Indoor Championships	Staten Island, New York	4th	3000m	8:48.68
2025	USATF Outdoor Championships	Eugene, Oregon	3rd	1500m	4:04.38
2025	USATF Cross Country Championships	Portland, Oregon	7th	2km	6:32.2
2024	USATF Indoor Championships	Albuquerque, New Mexico	2nd	1500m	4:08.70
2024	USA Olympic Trials	Eugene, Oregon	2nd	1500m	3:55.90
2023	USATF Championships	Eugene, Oregon	8th	1500m	4:06.82
2023	USATF Indoor Championships	Albuquerque, New Mexico	7th	1500m	4:22.01
2023	USATF Indoor Championships	Albuquerque, New Mexico	3rd	3000m	8:50.14
2022	USATF Championships	Eugene, Oregon	7th	1500m	4:09.44
