= 2026 Bauhausgalan =

Athletics meeting in Stockholm, Sweden

- Dates: 7 June 2026
- Host city: Stockholm, Sweden
- Venue: Stockholm Olympic Stadium
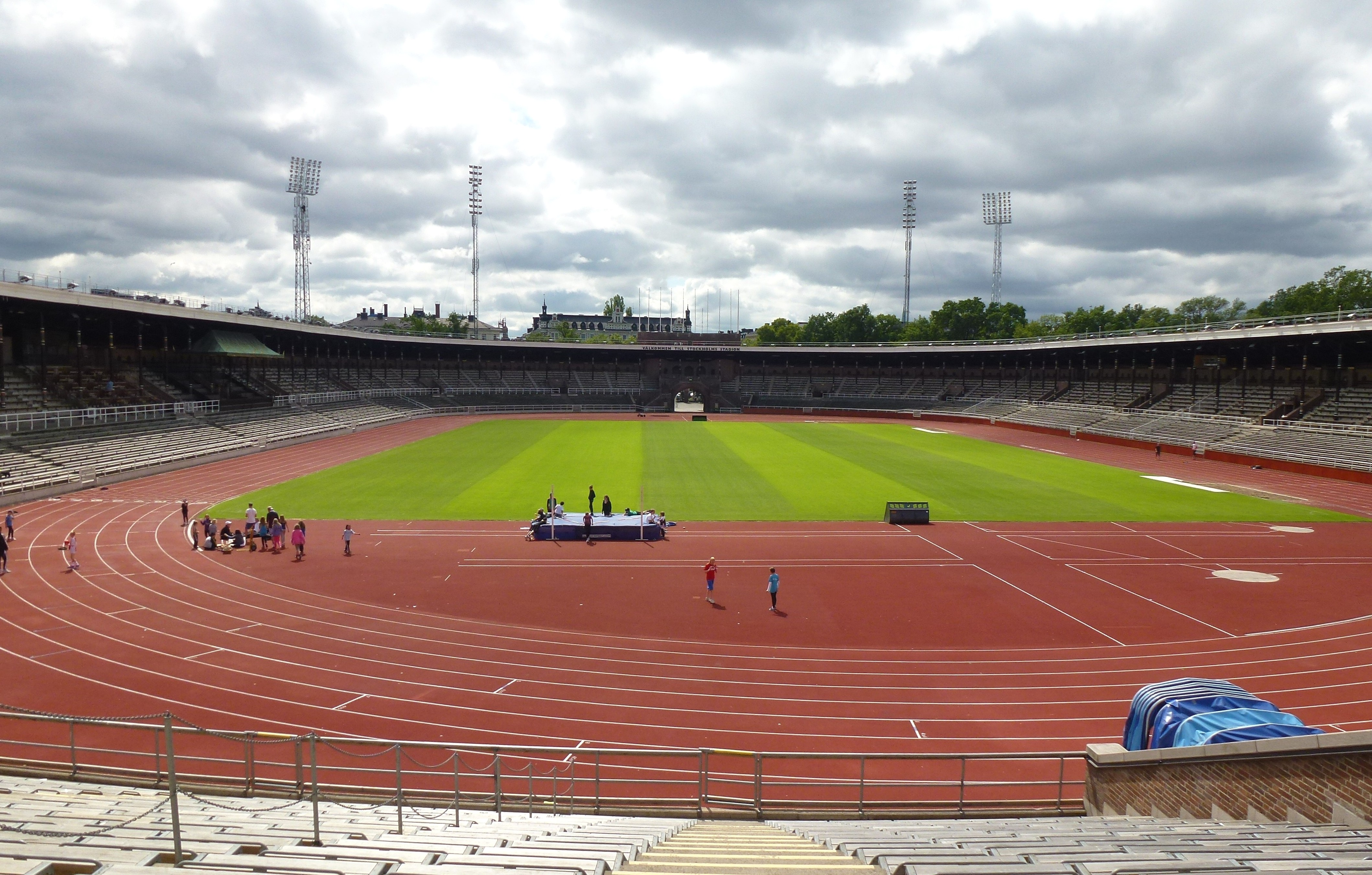
- Level: 2026 Diamond League

The 2026 Bauhausgalan was the 60th edition of the annual outdoor track and field meeting in Stockholm, Sweden. Held on 7 June 2026 at Stockholm Olympic Stadium, it was the fifth leg of the 2026 Diamond League – the highest level international track and field circuit.

== Diamond+ events results ==
=== Men's ===
200 Metres
Place	Athlete	Nation	Time	Points	Notes
1st place, gold medalist(s)	Kenny Bednarek	United States	19.87	8	
2nd place, silver medalist(s)	Sinesipho Dambile	South Africa	20.10	7	
3rd place, bronze medalist(s)	Courtney Lindsey	United States	20.24	6	
4	Reynier Mena	Cuba	20.53	5	
5	Mthi Mthimkulu	South Africa	20.78	4	
6	Linus Pihl	Sweden	20.90	3	=PB
—	Jeremiah Azu	Great Britain	DQ		TR16.8
—	Timothé Mumenthaler	Switzerland	DQ		TR16.8
			Wind: (+1.0 m/s)		

1500 Metres
Place	Athlete	Nation	Time	Points	Notes
1st place, gold medalist(s)	Yared Nuguse	United States	3:30.11	8	SB
2nd place, silver medalist(s)	Cameron Myers	Australia	3:30.32	7	
3rd place, bronze medalist(s)	Timothy Cheruiyot	Kenya	3:30.67	6	SB
4	Vincent Ciattei	United States	3:31.63	5	
5	Narve Gilje Nordås	Norway	3:31.74	4	SB
6	Hobbs Kessler	United States	3:31.76	3	SB
7	Ruben Verheyden	Belgium	3:32.91	2	
8	Robert Farken	Germany	3:32.99	1	SB
9	Azeddine Habz	France	3:33.84		
10	Flavien Szot	France	3:34.27		
11	Samuel Pihlström	Sweden	3:34.53		
12	Jimmy Gressier	France	3:34.63		SB
13	Jake Heyward	Great Britain	3:35.53		
14	Andreas Almgren	Sweden	3:36.81		SB
—	Ben Claridge	Great Britain	DNF		PM
—	Žan Rudolf	Slovenia	DNF		PM

Pole vault
Place	Athlete	Nation	Height	Points	Notes
1st place, gold medalist(s)	Kurtis Marschall	Australia	5.90 m	8	
2nd place, silver medalist(s)	Armand Duplantis	Sweden	5.80 m	7	
3rd place, bronze medalist(s)	Baptiste Thiery	France	5.80 m	6	
4	Menno Vloon	Netherlands	5.80 m	5	
5	Zach Bradford	United States	5.80 m	4	
6	Sondre Guttormsen	Norway	5.70 m	3	
6	Renaud Lavillenie	France	5.70 m	3	SB
8	Thibaut Collet	France	5.60 m	1	
8	Sam Kendricks	United States	5.60 m	1	

Discus throw
Place	Athlete	Nation	Distance	Points	Notes
1st place, gold medalist(s)	Daniel Ståhl	Sweden	69.60 m	8	SB
2nd place, silver medalist(s)	Matthew Denny	Australia	69.02 m	7	
3rd place, bronze medalist(s)	Kristjan Čeh	Slovenia	67.67 m	6	
4	Rojé Stona	Jamaica	66.42 m	5	
5	Sam Mattis	United States	66.03 m	4	
6	Henrik Janssen	Germany	65.53 m	3	
7	Alex Rose	Samoa	64.82 m	2	
8	Lawrence Okoye	Great Britain	64.02 m	1	
9	Mario Díaz	Cuba	61.45 m		

=== Women's ===
100 Metres
Place	Athlete	Nation	Time	Points	Notes
1st place, gold medalist(s)	Melissa Jefferson-Wooden	United States	10.84	8	SB
2nd place, silver medalist(s)	Amy Hunt	Great Britain	10.97	7	PB
3rd place, bronze medalist(s)	Patrizia Van der Weken	Luxembourg	11.05	6	SB
4	Minke Bisschops	Netherlands	11.08	5	SB
5	Zaynab Dosso	Italy	11.22	4	
6	Dina Asher-Smith	Great Britain	11.24	3	SB
7	Sade McCreath	Canada	11.29	2	
8	Julia Henriksson	Sweden	11.48	1	SB
			Wind: (+0.8 m/s)		

800 Metres
Place	Athlete	Nation	Time	Points	Notes
1st place, gold medalist(s)	Audrey Werro	Switzerland	1:53.98	8	DLR, NR, WL
2nd place, silver medalist(s)	Keely Hodgkinson	Great Britain	1:54.33	7	NR
3rd place, bronze medalist(s)	Roisin Willis	United States	1:57.56	6	PB
4	Anaïs Bourgoin	France	1:57.68	5	
5	Prudence Sekgodiso	South Africa	1:57.70	4	
6	Anna Wielgosz	Poland	1:57.92	3	PB
7	Raevyn Rogers	United States	1:57.94	2	SB
8	Sage Hurta-Klecker	United States	1:58.26	1	
9	Nigist Getachew	Ethiopia	1:58.59		
10	Pernille Karlsen Antonsen	Norway	1:58.82		PB
11	Gabriela Gajanová	Slovakia	2:02.88		
—	Rachel Klopfenstein	Mauritius	DNF		PM

Long jump
Place	Athlete	Nation	Distance	Points	Notes
1st place, gold medalist(s)	Hilary Kpatcha	France	6.85 m (+2.4 m/s)	8	
2nd place, silver medalist(s)	Larissa Iapichino	Italy	6.84 m (+2.1 m/s)	7	
3rd place, bronze medalist(s)	Nia Robinson	Jamaica	6.80 m (+2.4 m/s)	6	
4	Monae' Nichols	United States	6.74 m (+1.2 m/s)	5	
5	Agate de Sousa	Portugal	6.70 m (+0.7 m/s)	4	
6	Malaika Mihambo	Germany	6.70 m (+1.8 m/s)	3	
7	Claire Bryant	United States	6.69 m (+1.8 m/s)	2	
8	Ayla Hallberg Hossain	Sweden	6.63 m (+3.6 m/s)	1	PB
9	Alexis Brown	United States	6.62 m (+1.6 m/s)		
10	Maja Åskag	Sweden	6.56 m (+2.1 m/s)		

Shot put
Place	Athlete	Nation	Distance	Points	Notes
1st place, gold medalist(s)	Jessica Schilder	Netherlands	20.89 m	8	MR
2nd place, silver medalist(s)	Chase Jackson	United States	19.91 m	7	
3rd place, bronze medalist(s)	Sarah Mitton	Canada	19.89 m	6	
4	Fanny Roos	Sweden	18.90 m	5	
5	Yemisi Mabry	Germany	18.79 m	4	
6	Danniel Thomas-Dodd	Jamaica	18.56 m	3	
7	Abria Smith	United States	18.50 m	2	
8	Maggie Ewen	United States	17.93 m	1	
9	Jaida Ross	United States	17.80 m		
10	Auriol Dongmo	Portugal	17.45 m		

== Diamond events results ==
=== Men's ===
400 Metres
Place	Athlete	Nation	Time	Points	Notes
1st place, gold medalist(s)	Zakithi Nene	South Africa	44.48	8	
2nd place, silver medalist(s)	Jacory Patterson	United States	44.69	7	
3rd place, bronze medalist(s)	Jereem Richards	Trinidad and Tobago	44.87	6	SB
4	Khaleb McRae	United States	44.94	5	
5	Charles Dobson	Great Britain	45.15	4	SB
6	Carl Bengtström	Sweden	45.89	3	SB
7	Muzala Samukonga	Zambia	47.93	2	

800 Metres
Place	Athlete	Nation	Time	Points	Notes
1st place, gold medalist(s)	Cooper Lutkenhaus	United States	1:42.70	8	SB
2nd place, silver medalist(s)	Marco Arop	Canada	1:43.11	7	SB
3rd place, bronze medalist(s)	Slimane Moula	Algeria	1:43.41	6	SB
4	Ben Pattison	Great Britain	1:43.70 [.691]	5	SB
5	Peter Bol	Australia	1:43.70 [.700]	4	SB
6	Gabriel Tual	France	1:43.72	3	
7	Jake Wightman	Great Britain	1:44.39	2	SB
8	Bryce Hoppel	United States	1:44.66	1	
9	Kethobogile Haingura	Botswana	1:45.58		
10	Mohamed Attaoui	Spain	1:46.92		
—	Patryk Sieradzki	Poland	DNF		PM

3000 Metres steeplechase
Place	Athlete	Nation	Time	Points	Notes
1st place, gold medalist(s)	Soufiane El Bakkali	Morocco	8:10.40	8	
2nd place, silver medalist(s)	Edmund Serem	Kenya	8:12.27	7	
3rd place, bronze medalist(s)	Abraham Kibiwot	Kenya	8:12.75	6	
4	Salaheddine Ben Yazide	Morocco	8:13.02	5	
5	Geordie Beamish	New Zealand	8:13.11	4	SB
6	Simon Koech	Kenya	8:13.40	3	
7	Karl Bebendorf	Germany	8:14.13	2	SB
8	Matthew Wilkinson	United States	8:14.27	1	
9	Leonard Bett	Kenya	8:18.70		SB, PM
10	Daniel Arce	Spain	8:20.02		
11	Abrham Sime	Ethiopia	8:22.94		
12	Vidar Johansson	Sweden	8:23.65		SB
13	Ryuji Miura	Japan	8:23.97		SB
14	Leo Magnusson	Sweden	8:24.69		SB
15	Carson Williams	United States	8:25.55		SB
16	Simon Sundström	Sweden	8:25.99		
17	Eisa Girma	Ethiopia	8:26.33		
18	Kenneth Rooks	United States	8:29.00		
19	Hailu Ayalew	Ethiopia	8:37.96		
20	Maciej Megier	Poland	8:44.20		SB
—	Lamecha Girma	Ethiopia	DNF		
—	Abderrafia Bouassel	Morocco	DNF		PM
—	Wilberforce Chemiat Kones	Kenya	DNF		PM
—	Wesley Langat	Kenya	DNF		PM

=== Women's ===
3000 Metres steeplechase
Place	Athlete	Nation	Time	Points	Notes
1st place, gold medalist(s)	Marwa Bouzayani	Tunisia	8:59.28	8	MR
2nd place, silver medalist(s)	Elise Thorner	Great Britain	9:11.01	7	
3rd place, bronze medalist(s)	Gabrielle Jennings	United States	9:12.02	6	SB
4	Kena Tufa	Ethiopia	9:12.42	5	
5	Lea Meyer	Germany	9:13.67	4	SB
6	Ilona Mononen	Finland	9:15.18	3	NR
7	Alemnat Walle	Ethiopia	9:15.33	2	
8	Lexy Halladay-Lowry	United States	9:19.02	1	
9	Gracie Hyde	United States	9:24.19		
10	Juliane Hvid	Denmark	9:25.46		
11	Olivia Markezich	United States	9:25.79		
12	Courtney Wayment	United States	9:29.05		
13	Alice Finot	France	9:34.30		SB
14	Kinga Królik	Poland	9:35.47		
15	Olivia Gürth	Germany	9:42.35		
16	Meseret Yeshaneh	Ethiopia	10:12.27		SB
—	Agnieszka Chorzępa	Poland	DNF		PM

Discus throw
Place	Athlete	Nation	Distance	Points	Notes
1st place, gold medalist(s)	Valarie Sion	United States	68.60 m	8	
2nd place, silver medalist(s)	Jorinde van Klinken	Netherlands	66.57 m	7	
3rd place, bronze medalist(s)	Laulauga Tausaga	United States	65.89 m	6	
4	Feng Bin	China	64.15 m	5	
5	Marike Steinacker	Germany	62.13 m	4	
6	Vanessa Kamga	Sweden	61.93 m	3	
7	Shanice Craft	Germany	61.88 m	2	
8	Silinda Morales	Cuba	58.81 m	1	
9	Cierra Jackson	United States	52.90 m		

== Promotional events results ==
=== Men's ===
100 Metres
Place	Athlete	Nation	Time	Notes
1st place, gold medalist(s)	Jeremiah Azu	Great Britain	10.07	SB
2nd place, silver medalist(s)	Taymir Burnet	Netherlands	10.09	=PB
3rd place, bronze medalist(s)	Anej Čurin Prapotnik	Slovenia	10.27	
4	Xavi Mo-Ajok	Netherlands	10.28	SB
5	Linus Pihl	Sweden	10.45	
6	Filip Olsson	Sweden	10.53	=PB
7	William Thor	Sweden	10.55	SB
8	Johan Sjölander	Sweden	10.57	
			Wind: (+0.5 m/s)	

400 Metres Hurdles
Place	Athlete	Nation	Time	Notes
1st place, gold medalist(s)	Alison dos Santos	Brazil	47.11	
2nd place, silver medalist(s)	Matheus Lima	Brazil	47.37	PB
3rd place, bronze medalist(s)	Emil Agyekum	Germany	47.72	PB
4	Kemorena Tisang	Botswana	48.43	SB
5	Bassem Hemeida	Qatar	48.52	SB
6	Oskar Edlund	Sweden	48.81	SB
7	Assinie Wilson	Jamaica	49.13	
8	Tyri Donovan	Great Britain	49.75	

=== Women's ===
800 Metres
Place	Athlete	Nation	Time	Notes
1st place, gold medalist(s)	Marta Mitjans	Spain	2:00.63	SB
2nd place, silver medalist(s)	Malin Ingeborg	Norway	2:02.39	
3rd place, bronze medalist(s)	Bérénice Cleyet-Merle	France	2:02.52	SB
4	Jaylah Hancock-Cameron	Australia	2:02.66	
5	Georgia-Maria Despollari	Greece	2:02.84 [.834]	
6	Lucy Armitage	Great Britain	2:02.84 [.837]	
7	Ava Lloyd	Great Britain	2:02.85	SB
8	Maria Freij	Sweden	2:03.22	SB
9	Annemarie Nissen	Denmark	2:03.85	SB
10	Alica Schmidt	Germany	2:04.33	
—	Sylwana Gajda	Poland	DNF	PM

1500 Metres
Place	Athlete	Nation	Time	Notes
1st place, gold medalist(s)	Birke Haylom	Ethiopia	4:00.68	
2nd place, silver medalist(s)	Lucia Stafford	Canada	4:01.93	
3rd place, bronze medalist(s)	Erin Wallace	Great Britain	4:02.87	SB
4	Haregeweyni Kalayu	Ethiopia	4:03.86	
5	Joceline Wind	Switzerland	4:04.66	
6	Margot Appleton	United States	4:04.92	SB
7	Adèle Gay	France	4:05.11	SB
8	Ludovica Cavalli	Italy	4:05.15	
9	Gaia Sabbatini	Italy	4:05.55	SB
10	Mia Barnett	Sweden	4:06.00	SB
11	Anne Gine Løvnes	Norway	4:06.30	PB
12	Worknesh Mesele	Ethiopia	4:06.51	
13	Saron Berhe	Ethiopia	4:06.64	
14	Souad Elhaddad	Morocco	4:07.20	PB
15	Saga Provci	Sweden	4:09.95	PB
16	Julia Nielsen	Sweden	4:10.13	
17	Diane van Es	Netherlands	4:12.64	
—	Julia Jaguścik	Poland	DNF	PM

== National events results ==
=== Men's ===
800 Metres
Place	Athlete	Nation	Time	Notes
1st place, gold medalist(s)	Albert Söderqvist	Sweden	1:50.42	PB
2nd place, silver medalist(s)	Erik Skoglund	Sweden	1:50.52	PB
3rd place, bronze medalist(s)	Victor Wahlgren	Sweden	1:50.66	SB
4	Lars Johansson Hauge	Norway	1:51.20	PB
5	Vilmer Karlsson	Sweden	1:51.32	
6	Kevin Bodén	Sweden	1:51.58	SB
7	Noa Steiner	Sweden	1:52.66	PB
8	Axel Alness-Borg	Sweden	1:52.76	SB
—	John Bäck	Sweden	DNF	PM

1500 Metres
Place	Athlete	Nation	Time	Notes
1st place, gold medalist(s)	Yohannes Kiflay Brhane	Eritrea	3:45.40	SB
2nd place, silver medalist(s)	Sander Dybwad Mathiesen	Norway	3:45.52	SB
3rd place, bronze medalist(s)	Love Nilsson	Sweden	3:46.18	PB
4	Benjamin Åberg	Sweden	3:46.56	PB
5	Jonathan Grahn	Sweden	3:46.84	SB
6	Erik Nederheim	Sweden	3:46.98	SB
7	August Humeur	Sweden	3:47.10	PB
8	Alexander Nyström	Sweden	3:47.63	PB
9	Oliver Löfqvist	Sweden	3:48.49	SB
10	August da Silva Sveen	Norway	3:48.93	SB
11	Tim Yngesjö	Sweden	3:49.19	PB
12	Karl Ottfalk	Sweden	3:50.69	SB
13	Jimmy Nord	Sweden	3:51.61	
14	Jacob Klinth	Sweden	3:52.98	
15	Eric Källman	Sweden	3:55.44	SB
—	Adam Sörqvist	Sweden	DNF	
—	Tobias Eknor	Sweden	DNF	PM

=== Women's ===
1500 Metres
Place	Athlete	Nation	Time	Notes
1st place, gold medalist(s)	Anna Mark Helwigh	Denmark	4:22.07	SB
2nd place, silver medalist(s)	Agnes Thundal	Sweden	4:23.22	PB
3rd place, bronze medalist(s)	Josephine Thestrup	Denmark	4:23.23	SB
4	Ebba-Stina Bjuve	Sweden	4:23.45	
5	Stina Pettersson	Sweden	4:24.49	
6	Mia Helene Mørck	Denmark	4:25.57	
7	Caroline Högardh	Sweden	4:27.39	SB
8	Line Kalstrup Schulz	Denmark	4:28.67	
9	Linn Adolfsson	Sweden	4:29.29	PB
10	Frederica Richards	Sweden	4:33.19	
11	Freja Bjerström	Sweden	4:38.66	
—	Josefin Victoria Heier	Norway	DNF	PM

== See also ==
- 2026 Diamond League
