= 2026 Athletissima =

Athletics meeting in Lausanne, Switzerland

- Dates: 20-21 August 2026
- Host city: Lausanne, Switzerland
- Venue: Stade Olympique de la Pontaise
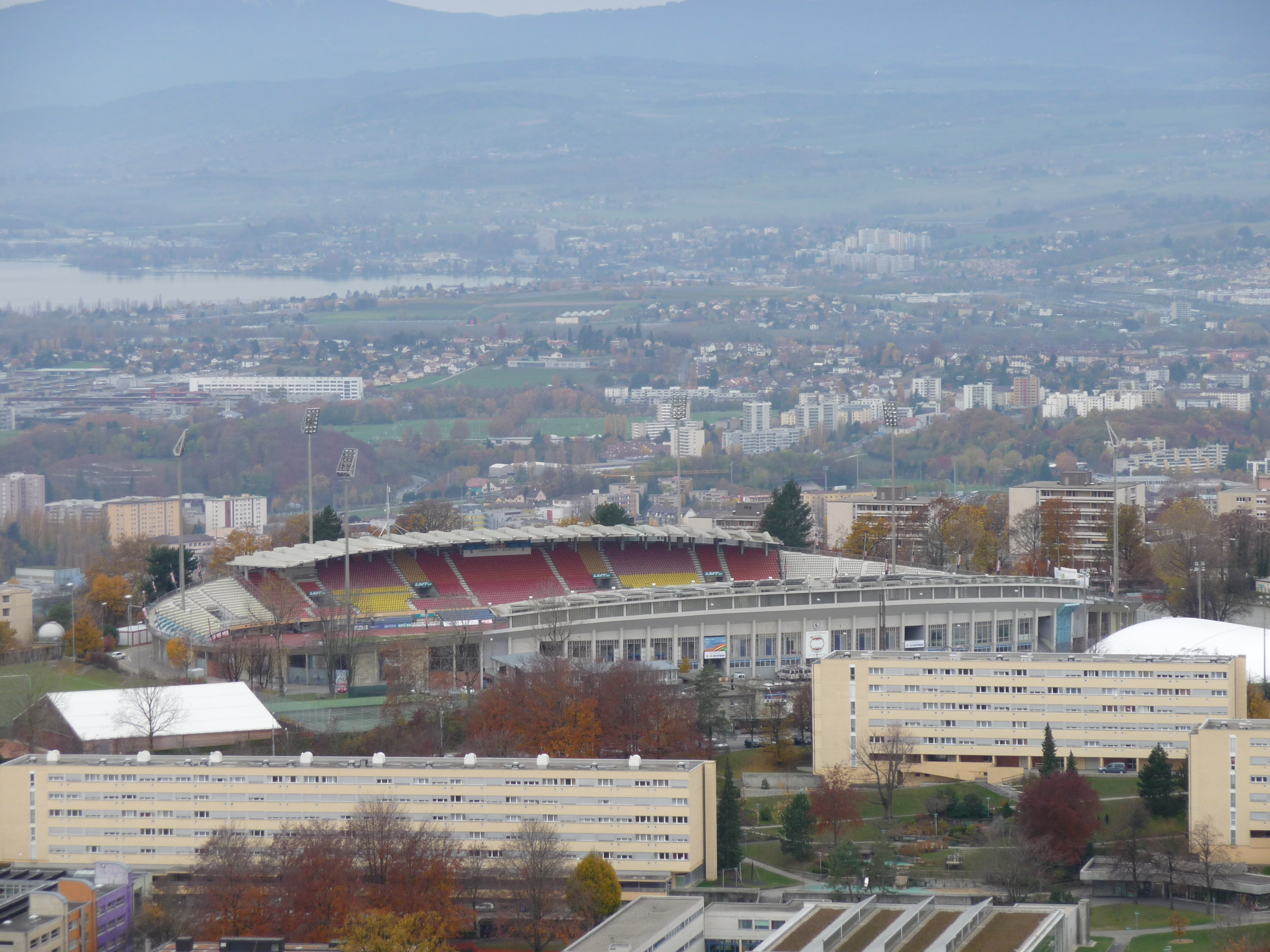
- Level: 2026 Diamond League

The 2026 Athletissima was the 50th edition of the annual outdoor track and field meeting in Lausanne, Switzerland. Held on 20 and 21 August at the Stade Olympique de la Pontaise, it was the twelfth leg of the 2026 Diamond League – the highest level international track and field circuit.

== Diamond+ events results ==
=== Men ===
200 Metres
Place	Athlete	Nation	Time	Points	Notes
1st place, gold medalist(s)	Letsile Tebogo	Botswana	19.87	8	
2nd place, silver medalist(s)	Sinesipho Dambile	South Africa	19.98	7	
3rd place, bronze medalist(s)	Makanakaishe Charamba	Zimbabwe	20.14	6	
4	José Figueroa	Puerto Rico	20.16	5	
5	Zharnel Hughes	Great Britain	20.33	4	
6	Timothé Mumenthaler	Switzerland	20.39	3	
7	Courtney Lindsey	United States	20.61	2	
8	Brandon Hicklin	United States	20.67	1	
			Wind: (−0.3 m/s)		

800 Metres
Place	Athlete	Nation	Time	Points	Notes
1st place, gold medalist(s)	Emmanuel Wanyonyi	Kenya	1:42.19	8	
2nd place, silver medalist(s)	Djamel Sedjati	Algeria	1:42.31	7	SB
3rd place, bronze medalist(s)	Brandon Miller	United States	1:42.55	6	
4	Marco Arop	Canada	1:43.18	5	
5	Gabriel Tual	France	1:44.18	4	
6	Marino Bloudek	Croatia	1:44.21	3	SB
7	David Barroso	Spain	1:44.63	2	
8	Francesco Pernici	Italy	1:44.79	1	
—	Patryk Sieradzki	Poland	DNF		PM

Long jump
Place	Athlete	Nation	Distance	Points	Notes
1st place, gold medalist(s)	Miltiadis Tentoglou	Greece	8.24 m (+2.1 m/s)	8	
2nd place, silver medalist(s)	Simon Ehammer	Switzerland	8.13 m (+1.3 m/s)	7	
3rd place, bronze medalist(s)	Luka Bošković	Serbia	8.07 m (+0.5 m/s)	6	
4	Jorge A. Hodelín	Cuba	8.06 m (+1.1 m/s)	5	
5	Gerson Baldé	Portugal	8.02 m (+0.6 m/s)	4	
6	Wayne Pinnock	Jamaica	8.01 m (+1.6 m/s)	3	
7	Anvar Anvarov	Uzbekistan	7.91 m (+1.1 m/s)	2	
8	Bozhidar Sarâboyukov	Bulgaria	7.88 m (+1.0 m/s)	1	
9	Tajay Gayle	Jamaica	7.70 m (+0.7 m/s)		

Javelin throw
Place	Athlete	Nation	Distance	Points	Notes
1st place, gold medalist(s)	Rumesh Tharanga	Sri Lanka	88.14 m	8	
2nd place, silver medalist(s)	Neeraj Chopra	India	88.05 m	7	SB
3rd place, bronze medalist(s)	Anderson Peters	Grenada	86.69 m	6	SB
4	Keshorn Walcott	Trinidad and Tobago	83.71 m	5	SB
5	Marc Minichello	United States	80.06 m	4	
6	Curtis Thompson	United States	78.13 m	3	
7	Jakub Vadlejch	Czech Republic	77.32 m	2	
8	Artur Felfner	Ukraine	74.84 m	1	
9	Simon Wieland	Switzerland	73.23 m		

=== Women ===
200 Metres
Place	Athlete	Nation	Time	Points	Notes
1st place, gold medalist(s)	Kayla White	United States	22.18	8	
2nd place, silver medalist(s)	Amy Hunt	Great Britain	22.23 [.314]	7	
3rd place, bronze medalist(s)	Favour Ofili	Nigeria	22.23 [.317]	6	
4	Anavia Battle	United States	22.65	5	
5	Fabienne Hoenke	Switzerland	22.83	4	
6	Léonie Pointet	Switzerland	23.55	3	
—	Shericka Jackson	Jamaica	DNF	2	
			Wind: (+0.3 m/s)		

800 Metres
Place	Athlete	Nation	Time	Points	Notes
1st place, gold medalist(s)	Audrey Werro	Switzerland	1:55.33	8	MR
2nd place, silver medalist(s)	Femke Broeders-Bol	Netherlands	1:55.41	7	NR
3rd place, bronze medalist(s)	Saida Tsehaye	Ethiopia	1:56.92	6	PB
4	Veronica Vancardo	Switzerland	1:58.68	5	
5	Valentina Rosamilia	Switzerland	1:58.93	4	
6	Addison Wiley	United States	1:59.22	3	
7	Lilian Odira	Kenya	1:59.25	2	
8	Prudence Sekgodiso	South Africa	1:59.58	1	
9	Oratile Nowe	Botswana	2:00.89		
10	Sage Hurta-Klecker	United States	2:02.78		
—	Myrte van der Schoot	Netherlands	DNF		PM

100 Metres hurdles
Place	Athlete	Nation	Time	Points	Notes
1st place, gold medalist(s)	Masai Russell	United States	12.27	8	MR
2nd place, silver medalist(s)	Nadine Visser	Netherlands	12.42	7	
3rd place, bronze medalist(s)	Alaysha Johnson	United States	12.49	6	
4	Rayniah Jones	United States	12.57	5	
5	Pia Skrzyszowska	Poland	12.61	4	
6	Ditaji Kambundji	Switzerland	12.71	3	
7	Demisha Roswell	Jamaica	13.03	2	
			Wind: (−0.2 m/s)		

Pole vault
Place	Athlete	Nation	Height	Points	Notes
1st place, gold medalist(s)	Hana Moll	United States	4.84 m	8	
2nd place, silver medalist(s)	Angelica Moser	Switzerland	4.74 m	7	
3rd place, bronze medalist(s)	Katie Moon	United States	4.64 m	6	
4	Sandi Morris	United States	4.64 m	5	
5	Imogen Ayris	New Zealand	4.64 m	4	
6	Eliza McCartney	New Zealand	4.50 m	3	
6	Tina Šutej	Slovenia	4.50 m	3	
8	Wilma Heltelä	Finland	4.50 m	1	
9	Emily Grove	United States	4.50 m		
10	Margot Chevrier	France	4.36 m		

== Diamond events results ==
=== Men ===
5000 Metres
Place	Athlete	Nation	Time	Points	Notes
1st place, gold medalist(s)	Birhanu Balew	Bahrain	12:57.55	8	
2nd place, silver medalist(s)	Parker Wolfe	United States	12:58.20	7	
3rd place, bronze medalist(s)	Nico Young	United States	12:58.33	6	SB
4	Graham Blanks	United States	12:59.16	5	
5	Cornelius Kemboi	Kenya	12:59.33	4	
6	Mezgebu Sime	Ethiopia	12:59.48	3	
7	Kuma Girma	Ethiopia	13:00.22	2	SB
8	Dominic Lokinyomo Lobalu	Switzerland	13:00.73	1	
9	Khairi Bejiga	Ethiopia	13:03.27		PB
10	Egide Ntakarutimana	Burundi	13:07.21		
11	Grant Fisher	United States	13:07.74		
12	Laban Kiptoo Kosgei	Kenya	13:08.39		
13	Shimelis Niguse	Ethiopia	13:08.78		PB
14	Jacob Krop	Kenya	13:13.29		
15	Charles Kiboino	Kenya	13:15.76		SB
16	Getnet Wale	Ethiopia	13:22.11		
17	Mathew Kipsang	Kenya	13:40.32		
18	Abderezak Suleman	Eritrea	14:12.84		SB
—	Santiago Catrofe	Uruguay	DNF		
—	Eduardo Herrera	Mexico	DNF		
—	Žan Rudolf	Slovenia	DNF		PM
—	Tim Verbaandert	Netherlands	DNF		PM

Pole vault
Place	Athlete	Nation	Height	Points	Notes
1st place, gold medalist(s)	Armand Duplantis	Sweden	6.21 m	8	MR
2nd place, silver medalist(s)	Emmanouil Karalis	Greece	6.16 m	7	
3rd place, bronze medalist(s)	Kurtis Marschall	Australia	5.91 m	6	
4	Sondre Guttormsen	Norway	5.91 m	5	
5	Chris Nilsen	United States	5.91 m	4	
6	EJ Obiena	Philippines	5.81 m	3	
7	Zach Bradford	United States	5.81 m	2	
7	Sam Kendricks	United States	5.81 m	2	
9	KC Lightfoot	United States	5.81 m		
10	Baptiste Thiery	France	5.51 m		
11	Renaud Lavillenie	France	5.51 m		

Triple jump
Place	Athlete	Nation	Distance	Points	Notes
1st place, gold medalist(s)	Pedro Pichardo	Portugal	17.44 m (−1.0 m/s)	8	
2nd place, silver medalist(s)	Yasser Triki	Algeria	17.43 m (+2.7 m/s)	7	
3rd place, bronze medalist(s)	Andy Díaz	Italy	17.20 m (−0.5 m/s)	6	
4	Russell Robinson	United States	16.93 m (−0.1 m/s)	5	
5	Jordan Scott	Jamaica	16.86 m (−0.5 m/s)	4	
6	Lázaro Martínez	Cuba	16.69 m (−0.8 m/s)	3	
7	Andrea Dallavalle	Italy	16.27 m (−1.0 m/s)	2	
8	Almir dos Santos	Brazil	16.20 m (−1.4 m/s)	1	

=== Women ===
400 Metres hurdles
Place	Athlete	Nation	Time	Points	Notes
1st place, gold medalist(s)	Emma Zapletalová	Slovakia	52.41	8	
2nd place, silver medalist(s)	Anna Cockrell	United States	53.15	7	
3rd place, bronze medalist(s)	Paulien Couckuyt	Belgium	53.28	6	NR
4	Rushell Clayton	Jamaica	53.65	5	
5	Gianna Woodruff	Panama	54.40	4	
6	Jasmine Jones	United States	54.45	3	
7	Fatoumata Binta Diallo	Portugal	54.68	2	
8	Kemi Adekoya	Bahrain	55.21	1	

3000 Metres steeplechase
Place	Athlete	Nation	Time	Points	Notes
1st place, gold medalist(s)	Winfred Yavi	Bahrain	9:00.04	8	MR
2nd place, silver medalist(s)	Faith Cherotich	Kenya	9:01.90	7	
3rd place, bronze medalist(s)	Marwa Bouzayani	Tunisia	9:05.55	6	
4	Doris Lemngole	Kenya	9:07.09	5	
5	Lexy Halladay	United States	9:08.35	4	PB
6	Kena Tufa	Ethiopia	9:12.69	3	
7	Gabrielle Jennings	United States	9:15.29	2	
8	Elise Thorner	Great Britain	9:18.29	1	
9	Olivia Gürth	Germany	9:22.47		
10	Lea Meyer	Germany	9:22.48		
11	Courtney Wayment	United States	9:32.03		
12	Alemnat Walle	Ethiopia	9:32.95		
13	Rihab Dhahri	Tunisia	9:35.70		
14	Angelina Ellis	United States	9:36.60		
—	Gesa Felicitas Krause	Germany	DNF		
—	Meseret Yeshaneh	Ethiopia	DNF		
—	Agnieszka Chorzępa	Poland	DNF		PM

Javelin throw
Place	Athlete	Nation	Distance	Points	Notes
1st place, gold medalist(s)	Haruka Kitaguchi	Japan	64.90 m	8	SB
2nd place, silver medalist(s)	Flor Ruiz	Colombia	64.29 m	7	
3rd place, bronze medalist(s)	Adriana Vilagoš	Serbia	62.28 m	6	
4	Mackenzie Little	Australia	61.13 m	5	
5	Sara Kolak	Croatia	59.77 m	4	
6	Madison Wiltrout	United States	58.81 m	3	
7	Anete Sietiņa	Latvia	58.73 m	2	
8	Sigrid Borge	Norway	58.54 m	1	
9	Leonie Hügli	Switzerland	53.83 m		

== Promotional events results ==
=== Men ===
110 Metres hurdles
Place	Athlete	Nation	Time	Notes
1st place, gold medalist(s)	Jamal Britt	United States	13.13	
2nd place, silver medalist(s)	Kendry Menéndez	Cuba	13.20	
3rd place, bronze medalist(s)	Jason Joseph	Switzerland	13.29	
4	Orlando Bennett	Jamaica	13.38	
5	Tatsuki Abe	Japan	13.39	
6	Elie Bacari	Belgium	13.53	
7	Shunsuke Izumiya	Japan	13.55	
8	Ja'Kobe Tharp	United States	14.38	
			Wind: (−0.5 m/s)	

400 Metres hurdles
Place	Athlete	Nation	Time	Notes
1st place, gold medalist(s)	Rai Benjamin	United States	46.67	MR
2nd place, silver medalist(s)	İsmail Nezir	Turkey	48.08	PB
3rd place, bronze medalist(s)	Bassem Hemeida	Qatar	48.17	
4	Matic Ian Guček	Slovenia	48.25	
5	Alastair Chalmers	Great Britain	48.65	
6	Michal Rada	Czech Republic	48.70 [.693]	
7	Owe Fischer-Breiholz	Germany	48.70 [.694]	
8	Jesús David Delgado	Spain	48.74	

== See also ==
- 2026 Diamond League
