= Zak Mahamed =

British athlete (born 2000)

Zakariya Mahamed
Personal information
- Nationality: British
- Born: 29 November 2000 (age 25) Ethiopia

Sport
- Sport: Athletics
- Event(s): Cross country, Long distance running

Achievements and titles
- Personal best(s): 5000m: 13:24.83 (Huelva, 2024); 10,000m: 27:46.55 (London, 2023); 10k: 27.46 (Valencia, 2026); Half Marathon: 1:00:46 (Barcelona, 2026)
Medal record
Men's athletics
Representing Great Britain
European Cross Country Championships
Silver medal – second place	2022 Turin	U23 race
Gold medal – first place	2022 Turin	U23 team
Gold medal – first place	2019 Lisbon	U23 Team
Bronze medal – third place	2024 Antalya	Team race

Zak Mahamed (born 29 November 2000) is a British long distance and cross country runner.

== Early and personal life ==
Mahamed emigrated from Ethiopia to Southampton in England with his family in 2011. He runs for Southampton Athletics Club and studied at Southampton Solent University. His brother Mahamed Mahamed is also an international runner.

== Career ==
Mahamed won gold as part of the British U23 team at the 2019 European Cross Country Championships in Lisbon. Mahamed was selected to represent Great Britain and Northern Ireland at the 2021 European Cross Country Championships in Fingal-Dublin, Ireland. The following year, Mahamed won silver at the European Cross Country U23 race in Turin, Italy.

In 2023, he set new personal best times over 5000m (13:47.43), 10,000m (27:56.70), 5 km (13:57), 10 km (28:24), 10 miles (46:41) and the half marathon (63:32). He set a new 10,000 metres personal best of 27:46.55 in London in May 2024. That month, he was selected to run the 10,000 metres for Britain at the 2024 European Athletics Championships in Rome. He was selected for the British team for the 2024 European Cross Country Championships in Antalya, Turkey.

In February 2025, he set a new personal best of 61:43 at the Barcelona half marathon. In September 2025, after a couple of months without racing, he won the London 10k Road Road for the first time in his career, running a time of 29:07. On 8 November, he placed fourth in the men's 9.6 km race at the Cardiff Cross Challenge in Wales, a gold race part of the World Athletics Cross Country Tour, finishing behind Kenyans Mathew Kipsang, Victor Kimosop and Stephen Kimutai. Competing in Valencia on 11 January 2026, he ran 27:46 for the 10 km. Mahamed ran a personal best 60:46 for the half marathon in Barcelona in February 2026.
