= Alemnat Walle =

Ethiopian athlete (born 2006)

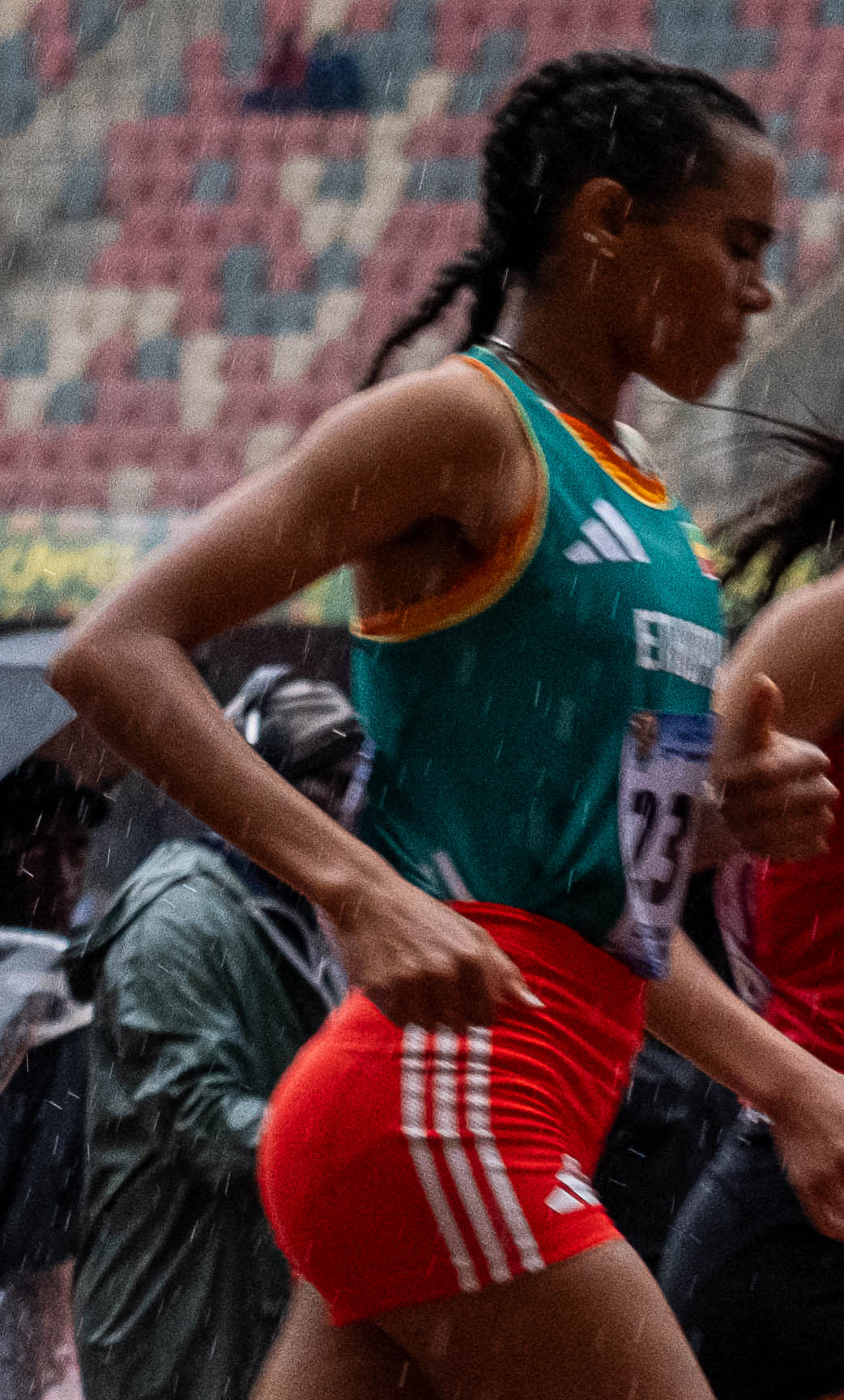

Personal information
- Nationality: Ethiopian
- Born: 29 January 2006 (age 20)

Sport
- Sport: Athletics
- Event: Steeplechase

Achievements and titles
- Personal bests: 3000m s'chase: 9:06.88 (Eugene, 2025)
Medal record
Women's Athletics
Representing Ethiopia
African Championships
Silver medal – second place	2024 Douala	3000 m s'chase
African U18 Championships
Gold medal – first place	2023 Ndola	2000 m s'chase

Alemnat Walle Fenta (born 29 January 2006) is an Ethiopian steeplechaser and long-distance runner.

== Biography ==
In May 2024, she won the gold medal at the African U18 Championships in Ndola, Zambia in the 2000 metres steeplechase, an Ethiopian U20 record time of 6:14.29. In November 2023, she was announced to compete in the Cross La Mandria International cross country running race. She won the Abu Dhabi 10K in December 2023.

In April 2024, she finished fifth in the 3000 metres steeplechase at the Kip Keino Classic in Kenya. In June 2024, she won the silver medal at the 2024 African Championships in Athletics in the Women's 3000 metres steeplechase in Douala, Cameroon.

In January 2025, she finished second over 10 km on the road at the Night of San Antón in Jaén, Spain. In June 2025, she lowered her personal best for the 3000 metres steeplechase to 9:20.08 competing at the Znamensky Brothers Memorial in Russia. She lowered her personal best to 9:06.88 at the 2025 Prefontaine Classic on 5 July. In July 2025, she was named for the Ethiopian team for the 3000 metres steeplechase at the 2025 World Athletics Championships in Tokyo, Japan, however she did not finish her semi-final.

In May 2026, she placed fifth in the 3000 m steeplechase at the 2026 Shanghai Diamond League. She won in 9:16.18 at the Paavo Nurmi Games in Finland on 3 June ahead of Gracie Hyde and Ilona Mononen. On 7 June, she ran 9:15.33 for a top-eight finish at the Diamond League event in Stockholm.
