= Toby Gillen =

Australian middle-distance runner (born 2001)

Personal information
- Born: 23 May 2001 (age 25)

Sport
- Sport: Athletics
- Event: Middle-distance running
Medal record
Men's athletics
Representing Australia
World Road Running Championships
Silver medal – second place	2026 Copenhagen	5k mixed team

Toby Gillen (born 23 May 2001) is an Australian middle-distance runner.

== Biography ==
Originally from Cairns, as a teenager in 2017, he placed second in the Great Barrier Reef Marathon's 10km run.

Gillen left Australia to study in the United States in 2022. Competing for Saint Louis University and the University of Mississippi, Gillen reached the NCAA Outdoor Championships for three consecutive years between 2023 and 2025 over 5000 metres, winning All-American honours for the 5000 meters in 2024, as he finished in seventh place overall. In 2026, he joined On Athletics Club Oceania under Head Coach Craig Mottram.

Competing in the 5k run at the 2026 World Athletics Road Running Championships on 19 September 2026 in Copenhagen, he won the silver medal with the Australian team in the mixed event alongside Rose Davies, Georgia Griffith and Ky Robinson, running a personal best of 13:35 to place twenty-fifth in the individual race.
