= Daisilah Jerono =

Kenyan long-distance runner (born 2002)

Personal information
- Born: 16 November 2002 (age 24)

Sport
- Sport: Athletics
- Events: Long distance running, Cross country running
Medal record
Women's athletics
Representing Kenya
World Road Running Championships
Silver medal – second place	2026 Copenhagen	Half marathon team
Bronze medal – third place	2026 Copenhagen	Half marathon

Daisilah Jerono (born 16 November 2002) is a Kenyan long-distance runner. She placed third in the half marathon at the 2026 World Athletics Road Running Championships.

== Biography ==
In October 2025, Jerono won over 10k at the Kenya Defence Forces (KDF) Cross Country Championship in Nairobi.

In January 2026, Jerono won the Mitja Marató Internacional Vila de Santa Pola Half Marathon, a World Athletics Label road race event. Having raced to a new half marathon personal best of 1:06:59 in February 2026 in Dubai, Jerono ran 1:05:21 at the 2026 Berlin Half Marathon in March, and ran 31:29 to win over 10k at the Totalsports Women's Race Cape Town on 9 August 2026.

On 20 September, Jerono placed fourth in the women's half marathon at the 2026 World Athletics Road Running Championships in Copenhagen, helping Kenya to the team gold medal in the event alongside race winner Agnes Ngetich. On 19 November, Jerono was elevated to bronze following Veronica Loleo's doping ban. On 25 October, she placed third at the Valencia half marathon in a personal best of 1:04:11.
