= 2026 World Athletics Road Running Championships =

Athletics championship event

- Host city: Copenhagen
- Country: Denmark
- Organizer: World Athletics
- Edition: 2nd
- Nations: 79
- Athletes: 448
- Events: 9 (6 elite and 3 mass start)
- Dates: 19 and 20 September 2026
- Race length: Half marathon, 5K, mile

The 2026 World Athletics Road Running Championships took place in Copenhagen, Denmark, on 19 and 20 September 2026. As the second edition of the World Athletics Road Running Championships, they include the World Athletics Half Marathon Championships.

The championships consist of races for the half marathon, 5K, and mile distances, and also included mass-participation events for the same. This echoes the Gran Fondo tradition in cycling, and mass start events in triathlon.

The event was awarded to Copenhagen in August 2023. In March 2026, due to a mistake in the American qualifiers for the event where some leading runners were led off-course, World Athletics granted the United States three extra non-scoring running slots in the women's half marathon.

It featured Norwegian runner Jakob Ingebrigtsen in 5 kilometres. He ran the race one week after his 2026 World Athletics Ultimate Championships 5000 m win.

World leads were set by the winners of the men's and women's road miles. In the 5 kilometres run, Ingebrigtsen was out-kicked by Dawit Seare of Eritrea.

== Championships timetable ==
The road mile run and 5 kilometres races were on 19 September, while the half marathon was on 20 September.

Date	Local Time	Event	Sex
Day 1 : 19 September	10:10	Road Mile	Women
Day 1 : 19 September	10:30	Road Mile	Men
Day 1 : 19 September	14:10	5 Kilometres	Women
Day 1 : 19 September	14:40	5 Kilometres	Men
Day 2 : 20 September	09:10	Half Marathon	Women
Day 2 : 20 September	09:45	Half Marathon	Men

== Medal summary ==
Event	Gold		Silver		Bronze	
Half marathon men	Andreas Almgren; Sweden	58:06 AR	Nicholas Kipkorir; Kenya	58:11	Joshua Cheptegei; Uganda	58:26 PB
Half marathon men team	Kenya (KEN); Nicholas Kipkorir; Gideon Rono; Alex Matata	2:56:30	Ethiopia (ETH); Tadese Worku; Belay Bezabeh; Bereket Nega	2:59:47	United States (USA); Conner Mantz; Ahmed Muhumed; Wesley Kiptoo	3:01:34
Half marathon women	Agnes Jebet Ngetich; Kenya	1:05:15 WR_{wo}	Florence Niyonkuru; Rwanda	1:06:08 NR	Daisilah Jerono; Kenya	1:06:13
Half marathon women team	United States (USA); Emma Grace Hurley; Weini Kelati; Jessica McClain	3:19:51	Kenya (KEN); Agnes Jebet Ngetich; Daisilah Jerono; Lilian Kasait Rengeruk	3:22:04	Ethiopia (ETH); Ftaw Zeray; Meselech Alemayehu; Baraky Redae	3:22:40
5 km road race men	Dawit Seare; Eritrea	12:56 NR	Jakob Ingebrigtsen; Norway	12:59 NR	Saymon Amanuel; Eritrea	13:00 PB
5 km road race women	Likina Amebaw; Ethiopia	14:41 SB	Caroline Gitonga; Kenya	14:48	Rose Davies; Australia	14:50 AR
5 km road race team	Ethiopia (ETH); Likina Amebaw; Aleshign Baweke; Addisu Yihune; Mezgebu Sime	55:49	Australia (AUS); Rose Davies; Georgia Griffith; Ky Robinson; Toby Gillen	56:30	Kenya (KEN); Caroline Gitonga; Caroline Nyaga; Mathew Kipchumba Kipsang; Charles Kiboino	56:31
Road mile men	Robert Farken; Germany	3:51.80 WL	Yared Nuguse; United States	3:52.33 SB	Ruben Querinjean; Luxembourg	3:52.77 NR
Road mile women	Agathe Guillemot; France	4:22.74 WL	Freweyni Hailu; Ethiopia	4:24.35 SB	Mirriam Cherop; Kenya	4:25.71 SB
Road mile team	United States (USA); Addison Wiley; Gracie Hyde; Yared Nuguse; Vincent Ciattei	16:49.89	Australia (AUS); Linden Hall; Sarah Billings; Oliver Hoare; Jude Thomas	16:50.61	Kenya (KEN); Mirriam Cherop; Naomi Korir; Brian Komen; Kyumbe Munguti	16:51.36

== Medal table ==
* Host nation (Denmark)

Rank	Nation	Gold	Silver	Bronze	Total
1	Kenya	3	3	3	9
2	Ethiopia	2	2	1	5
3	United States	1	2	1	4
4	Eritrea	1	0	1	2
5	France	1	0	0	1
5	Germany	1	0	0	1
5	Sweden	1	0	0	1
8	Australia	0	2	1	3
9	Norway	0	1	0	1
10	Luxembourg	0	0	1	1
10	Rwanda	0	0	1	1
10	Uganda	0	0	1	1
Totals (12 entries)		10	10	10	30

== Results ==
=== Men's half marathon ===
Held on 20 September

Rank	Name	Nationality	Time	Notes
1st place, gold medalist(s)	Andreas Almgren	Sweden	58:06	AR
2nd place, silver medalist(s)	Nicholas Kipkorir Kimeli	Kenya	58:11	
3rd place, bronze medalist(s)	Joshua Cheptegei	Uganda	58:26	PB
4	Tadese Worku	Ethiopia	58:35	PB
5	Gideon Kipkertich Rono	Kenya	58:57	
6	Hani Idriss Hersi	Djibouti	59:09	NR
7	Yemaneberhan Crippa	Italy	59:18	
8	Alex Nzioka Matata	Kenya	59:22	
9	Daniel Simiu Ebenyo	Kenya	59:42	SB
10	Othmane El Goumri	Morocco	59:53	PB
11	Célestin Ndikumana	Burundi	1:00:04	PB
12	Conner Mantz	United States	1:00:08	SB
13	Ahmed Muhumed	United States	1:00:15	PB
14	Belay Tilahun	Ethiopia	1:00:32	PB
15	Bereket Nega	Ethiopia	1:00:40	
16	Jacob Simonsen	Denmark	1:00:46	NR
17	Ablelom Maryo	Eritrea	1:01:00	PB
18	Bastien Augusto	France	1:01:04	
19	Zerei Kbrom Mezngi	Norway	1:01:08	SB
20	Jummanne Ngoya	Tanzania	1:01:08	PB
21	Rory Linkletter	Canada	1:01:09	
22	Cwenga Nose	South Africa	1:01:09	PB
23	Wesley Kiptoo	United States	1:01:11	SB
24	Hillary Bor	United States	1:01:12	
25	Emile Hafashimana	Burundi	1:01:16	
26	Yuma Nishizawa	Japan	1:01:17	
27	Tomoya Ogikubo	Japan	1:01:28	
28	Victor Boudin	France	1:01:36	
29	Saïd Mechaal	Spain	1:01:37	
30	Filmon Tesfu	Netherlands	1:01:40	
31	Bernard Emanuel	Tanzania	1:01:40	PB
32	Marcelo Laguera	Mexico	1:01:41	
33	Dorian Boulvin	Belgium	1:01:45	
34	Daisuke Sato	Japan	1:01:47	
35	Cameron Levins	Canada	1:01:49	
36	Joseph Wigfield	Great Britain	1:01:49	
37	Mustapha Akkaoui	Morocco	1:01:50	
38	Edward Marks	Australia	1:01:50	
39	Bayelign Teshager	Ethiopia	1:01:52	
40	Seare Weldezghi	ART	1:01:53	
41	Andrew Alexander	Canada	1:01:55	
42	Jan Kokalj	Slovenia	1:01:57	NR
43	Feb Chelegoi	Uganda	1:02:08	
44	Peter Lynch	Ireland	1:02:10	
45	Robin Hendrix	Belgium	1:02:10	
46	Major Tedros	Eritrea	1:02:13	PB
47	Charles Wheeler	Great Britain	1:02:18	SB
48	Abderrazak Charik	Algeria	1:02:19	SB
49	Cristhian Zamora	Uruguay	1:02:19	SB
50	Alberto Mondazzi	Italy	1:02:21	
51	Haftu Strintzos	Australia	1:02:22	
52	Baptiste Guyon	France	1:02:25	
53	Inyasi Nicodemus Sulley	Tanzania	1:02:27	SB
54	Therence Bizoza	Burundi	1:02:32	
55	Alfie Manthorpe	Great Britain	1:02:40	SB
56	Mande Bushendich	Uganda	1:02:43	SB
57	Timo Hinterndorfer	Austria	1:02:44	
58	Abiel Teklu	Eritrea	1:02:49	PB
59	Mohamed Reda El Aaraby	Morocco	1:02:59	
60	Martin Kiprotich	Uganda	1:03:00	
61	Thierry Irakoze	Burundi	1:03:05	PB
62	Sjur Prestsæter	Norway	1:03:06	PB
63	José Luis Santana	Mexico	1:03:06	SB
64	Etienne Daguinos	France	1:03:08	
65	Jonas Gertsen	Denmark	1:03:09	
66	Ren Qingdongzhibu	China	1:03:10	SB
67	Abeich Wol Akoon	South Sudan	1:03:17	PB
68	Giovani dos Santos	Brazil	1:03:19	
69	Neo Namiki	Japan	1:03:21	
70	Liam Boudin	Australia	1:03:22	
71	Toby Gualter	New Zealand	1:03:25	
72	Hiko Tonosa Haso	Ireland	1:03:27	
73	Per Svela	Norway	1:03:33	
74	Nicolae Alexandru Soare	Romania	1:03:38	
75	Giedrius Valinčius	Lithuania	1:03:40	SB
76	Thijs Nijhuis	Denmark	1:03:47	
77	Jacob Boutera	Norway	1:03:49	
78	Samuel Barata	Portugal	1:03:50	
79	Justin Kent	Canada	1:03:50	
80	Ádám Lomb	Hungary	1:03:57	
81	Mykola Mevsha	Ukraine	1:03:59	
82	Cruz Gómez	Mexico	1:04:14	
83	Aaron Gruen	Austria	1:04:16	
84	Héctor Garibay	Bolivia	1:04:22	SB
85	Rui Pinto	Portugal	1:04:27	
86	William Little	New Zealand	1:04:34	
87	Elroy Gelant	South Africa	1:04:41	
88	Arnaldo Martínez	Puerto Rico	1:04:59	
89	Héctor Pagán	Puerto Rico	1:05:00	
90	Jiang Fakun	China	1:05:03	
91	Connor Melton	New Zealand	1:05:11	
92	Luke Micallef	Malta	1:05:17	
93	Wang Tao	China	1:05:18	
94	Fábio Correia	Brazil	1:05:33	
95	Badr Jaafari	Italy	1:05:35	
96	Taonga Mbambo	New Zealand	1:05:38	SB
97	Lucas Barbosa	Brazil	1:05:40	
98	Ma Rui	China	1:05:42	
99	Morten Siht	Estonia	1:05:55	PB
100	Omar Hassan	ART	1:06:32	SB
101	Ayrton Ledesma	Mexico	1:06:40	
102	Simon Spiteri	Malta	1:06:45	
103	Yakoub Delhoum	Comoros	1:06:47	SB
104	James Dietrich	Honduras	1:06:51	PB
105	Dmitrijs Serjogins	Latvia	1:07:01	
106	Ferdinand Cereceda	Peru	1:07:28	
107	Eduardo Garcia	United States Virgin Islands	1:08:29	
108	Daviti Kharazishvili	Georgia	1:08:59	SB
109	Lukas Tarasevičius	Lithuania	1:09:10	SB
110	Tristan Boetti	Monaco	1:09:25	PB
111	José Mauricio González	Colombia	1:10:46	
112	Walter Rodríguez	Honduras	1:12:11	PB
113	Dechen Ugyen	Bhutan	1:12:14	PB
114	Roman Aleksanyan	Armenia	1:12:15	PB
115	He Yong	Singapore	1:12:32	SB
116	Ahmad Smour	Jordan	1:13:10	SB
117	Hoo Fang Zhou	Singapore	1:13:27	
118	Ip Seng Tou	Macau	1:13:53	
119	Simeon Jacob	Federated States of Micronesia	1:14:55	NR
120	Timothy Liau Ke Qin	Singapore	1:15:21	
121	Joshua Yeow	Singapore	1:15:38	
	Marcelo Manrique	Argentina	DNF	
	Jack Rowe	Great Britain	DNF	
	Hicham Ouladha	Morocco	DNF	
	Adam Nowicki	Poland	DNF	
	Ngconde Matwebu	South Africa	DNF	
	John Nahhay Wele	Tanzania	DNF	
	Franck Tchoupteng Tchouffi	Cameroon	DNS	
	Mikael Johnsen	Denmark	DNS	
	Ilia Tiapkin	Kyrgyzstan	DNS	
	Miguel Borges	Portugal	DNS	

=== Men's half marathon team ===
Rank	Team	Time	Note
1st place, gold medalist(s)	Kenya	2:56:30	
2nd place, silver medalist(s)	Ethiopia	2:59:47	
3rd place, bronze medalist(s)	United States	3:01:34	
4	Uganda	3:03:17	
5	Burundi	3:03:52	
6	Japan	3:04:32	
7	Morocco	3:04:42	
8	Canada	3:04:53	
9	France	3:05:05	
10	Tanzania	3:05:15	
11	Eritrea	3:06:02	
12	Great Britain	3:06:47	
13	Italy	3:07:14	
14	Australia	3:07:34	
15	Denmark	3:07:42	
16	Norway	3:07:47	
17	Mexico	3:09:01	
18	New Zealand	3:13:10	
19	China	3:13:31	
20	Brazil	3:14:32	
21	Singapore	3:41:20	

=== Women's half marathon ===
Held on 20 September

Rank	Name	Nationality	Time	Notes
1st place, gold medalist(s)	Agnes Jebet Ngetich	Kenya	1:05:15	WR (women only)
2nd place, silver medalist(s)	Veronica Loleo	Kenya	1:06:05	
3rd place, bronze medalist(s)	Florence Niyonkuru	Rwanda	1:06:08	NR
4	Daisilah Jerono	Kenya	1:06:13	
5	Emma Grace Hurley	United States	1:06:23	PB
6	Weini Kelati Frezghi	United States	1:06:35	
7	Jessica McClain	United States	1:06:53	PB
8	Ftaw Zeray	Ethiopia	1:07:07	
9	Fatima Ezzahra Birdaha	Morocco	1:07:33	NR
10	Esther Chebet	Uganda	1:07:38	
11	Meselech Alemayehu	Ethiopia	1:07:42	PB
12	Rebecca Chelangat	Uganda	1:07:43	SB
13	Glenrose Xaba	South Africa	1:07:49	
14	Baraky Redae	Ethiopia	1:07:51	
15	Emeline Imanizabayo	Rwanda	1:08:02	
16	Jadyn Keeler	Canada	1:08:03	NR
17	Ednah Kurgat	United States	1:08:11	PB
18	Tsigie Gebreselama	Ethiopia	1:08:30	
19	Chloé Herbiet	Belgium	1:08:44	
20	Carrie Ellwood	United States	1:09:12	SB
21	Elvanie Nimbona	Italy	1:09:14	
22	Mekdes Woldu	France	1:09:17	
23	Georgie Grgec	New Zealand	1:09:18	
24	Liang Tiantian	China	1:09:30	
25	Yūmi Yoshikawa	Japan	1:09:34	
26	Dolshi Tesfu	Eritrea	1:09:34	NR
27	Samantha Harrison	Great Britain	1:09:35	
28	Sheyla Eulogio	Peru	1:09:42	NR
29	Oria Liaci	Switzerland	1:10:15	PB
30	Alexandra Bell	Great Britain	1:10:21	
31	Alessia Zarbo	France	1:10:24	SB
32	Marta Galimany	Spain	1:10:24	
33	Margaux Sieracki	France	1:10:27	
34	Lilian Kasait Rengeruk	Kenya	1:10:36	SB
35	Annet Chemengich Chelangat	Uganda	1:10:41	SB
36	Julia Paternain	Uruguay	1:10:42	NR
37	Viviana Aroche	Guatemala	1:10:53	NR
38	Julia Mayer	Austria	1:10:54	NR
39	Angelique Ibishatse	Rwanda	1:10:56	PB
40	Laura Galván	Mexico	1:10:57	
41	Annie Rodenfels	United States	1:11:02	
42	Florence Caron	Canada	1:11:03	PB
43	Lisa Rooms	Belgium	1:11:08	
44	Yuna Takahashi	Japan	1:11:12	
45	Élissa Legault	Canada	1:11:15	PB
46	Nataliya Strebkova	Ukraine	1:11:16	PB
47	Zarita Suárez	Peru	1:11:31	
48	Carolina Wikström	Sweden	1:11:35	
49	Adela Honorato	Mexico	1:11:36	
50	Xia Yuyu	China	1:11:36	
51	Rebecca Lowe	Australia	1:11:38	PB
52	Wakana Kabasawa	Japan	1:11:56	
53	Susana Santos	Portugal	1:12:00	
54	Matea Parlov Koštro	Croatia	1:12:11	
55	Natasha Wodak	Canada	1:12:13	
56	Olga Nyzhnyk	Ukraine	1:12:16	
57	Núbia Silva	Brazil	1:12:33	
58	Nazret Weldu	Eritrea	1:12:35	SB
59	Mélody Julien	France	1:12:39	
60	Mariia Mazurenko	Ukraine	1:12:49	SB
61	Yang Yiting	China	1:12:57	
62	Rina Shimizu	Japan	1:13:07	
63	Esther Yeko Chekwemoi	Uganda	1:13:17	
64	Marie Perrier	Mauritius	1:13:21	SB
65	Salomé Rocha	Portugal	1:13:30	SB
66	Ruby Smee	Australia	1:13:31	
67	Mónica Silva	Portugal	1:13:34	SB
68	Donve Viljoen	Australia	1:13:43	
69	Carolien Millenaar	Denmark	1:13:47	
70	Cacisile Sosibo	South Africa	1:14:00	
71	Karabo Mailula	South Africa	1:14:21	PB
72	Agate Caune	Latvia	1:14:27	PB
73	Marinela Nineva	Bulgaria	1:14:30	SB
74	Sofiia Yaremchuk	Italy	1:14:31	SB
75	Anna Holm Jørgensen	Denmark	1:14:33	
76	María Luz Tesuri	Argentina	1:14:42	SB
77	Vaida Žūsinaitė-Nekriošienė	Lithuania	1:14:43	PB
78	Melissa Anastasakis	Greece	1:14:50	PB
79	Margarita Masías	Chile	1:14:52	SB
80	Diana Bogantes	Costa Rica	1:14:52	SB
81	Ariadna Fenes	Andorra	1:15:03	NR
82	Nanna Bové	Denmark	1:15:49	
83	Devora Avramova	Bulgaria	1:16:44	
84	Sophie Junge	Denmark	1:16:49	
85	Jéssica Ladeira	Brazil	1:17:08	
86	Loreta Kančytė	Lithuania	1:17:11	=SB
87	Leydy Romero	Colombia	1:17:17	PB
88	Daniela Torres	Mexico	1:18:01	
89	Agata Strausa	Latvia	1:18:21	
90	Brenda Flores	Mexico	1:18:23	
91	Anna Yusupova	Azerbaijan	1:19:19	SB
92	Ecaterina Cernat	Moldova	1:20:32	SB
93	Katherine Camp	New Zealand	1:20:36	
94	Idelma Delgado	El Salvador	1:20:54	PB
95	Laura Jegelevičiūtė	Lithuania	1:21:01	
96	Gabriela Mamani	Bolivia	1:21:20	
97	Íris Anna Skúladóttir	Iceland	1:21:36	SB
98	Maria Lucineida da Silva	Brazil	1:23:37	
99	Serena Teoh	Singapore	1:24:33	SB
100	Jasmine Teo	Singapore	1:25:17	
101	Bridget Klein	United States Virgin Islands	1:26:19	PB
102	Han Qinfei	Singapore	1:26:26	SB
103	Íris Dóra Snorradóttir	Iceland	1:27:13	SB
104	Wong San-san	Macau	1:27:56	
105	Valeria Amaya	Honduras	1:29:48	NR
	He Wuga	China	DNF	
	Klara Lukan	Slovenia	DNF	
	Lúcia Capingala	Angola	DNS	
	Nancy Layu	Cameroon	DNS	
	Aghazu Akuchukwu	Nigeria	DNS	
	Nicole Wood	Paraguay	DNS	

=== Women's half marathon team ===
Rank	Team	Time	Note
1st place, gold medalist(s)	Kenya	3:17:33	
2nd place, silver medalist(s)	United States	3:19:51	
3rd place, bronze medalist(s)	Ethiopia	3:22:40	
4	Rwanda	3:25:06	
5	Uganda	3:26:02	
6	France	3:30:08	
7	Canada	3:30:21	
8	Japan	3:32:42	
9	China	3:34:03	
10	South Africa	3:36:10	
11	Ukraine	3:36:21	
12	Australia	3:38:52	
13	Portugal	3:39:04	
14	Mexico	3:40:34	
15	Denmark	3:44:09	
16	Lithuania	3:52:55	
17	Brazil	3:53:18	
18	Singapore	4:16:16	

=== Men's 5 kilometres ===
Held on 19 September

Rank	Name	Nationality	Time	Notes
1st place, gold medalist(s)	Dawit Seare	Eritrea	12:56	NR
2nd place, silver medalist(s)	Jakob Ingebrigtsen	Norway	12:59	NR
3rd place, bronze medalist(s)	Saymon Amanuel	Eritrea	13:00	PB
4	Ky Robinson	Australia	13:04	ARPB
5	Keneth Kiprop	Uganda	13:04	PB
6	Addisu Yihune	Ethiopia	13:07	
7	Mezgebu Sime	Ethiopia	13:08	SB
8	Mathew Kipchumba Kipsang	Kenya	13:11	SB
9	Egide Ntakarutimana	Burundi	13:12	PB
10	Maxime Chaumeton	South Africa	13:13	
11	Drew Hunter	United States	13:14	AR
12	Mike Foppen	Netherlands	13:15	NR
13	Charles Kiboino	Kenya	13:15	PB
14	Jimmy Gressier	France	13:17	
15	Narve Gilje Nordås	Norway	13:17	
16	Darragh McElhinney	Ireland	13:22	NR
17	Dylan Jacobs	United States	13:24	PB
18	Dominic Lokinyomo Lobalu	Switzerland	13:29	SB
19	Artūrs Niklāvs Medveds	Latvia	13:30	NR
20	Elie Sindayikengdera	Burundi	13:31	PB
21	David Mullarkey	Great Britain	13:31	PB
22	Jonas Raess	Switzerland	13:32	SB
23	Francesco Guerra	Italy	13:33	PB
24	Osama Er Redouani	Morocco	13:33	PB
25	Toby Gillen	Australia	13:35	PB
26	Aron Gebremariam	ART	13:36	SB
27	Tim Verbaandert	Netherlands	13:38	
28	Rui Suzuki	Japan	13:38	PB
29	Joel Ibler Lillesø	Denmark	13:39	SB
30	Alex Kiplangat	Uganda	13:39	PB
31	Simon Sundström	Sweden	13:40	PB
32	Vid Botolin	Slovenia	13:41	NR
33	Jânio Varjão	Brazil	13:41	PB
34	Thapelo Ramakhoase	South Africa	13:43	
35	Kobe Hermans	Belgium	13:43	PB
36	Robbe Camphens	Belgium	13:44	PB
37	Konjoneh Maggi	Italy	13:45	PB
38	Brian Fay	Ireland	13:48	
39	Evan Burke	Canada	13:49	PB
40	Yota Mashiko	Japan	13:50	PB
41	Simas Bertašius	Lithuania	13:51	NR
42	Víctor Ortiz	Puerto Rico	13:52	SB
43	Theo Quax	New Zealand	13:54	
44	Matthew Beaudet	Canada	13:58	PB
45	Thiago André	Brazil	14:00	PB
46	Axel Vang Christensen	Denmark	14:00	SB
47	Israel Tinajero	Mexico	14:43	PB
48	Flavien Szot	France	14:47	
49	Shaun Goh	Singapore	14:47	NR
50	Filip Jančík	Slovakia	15:10	PB
51	Ethan Yan	Singapore	15:25	PB

=== Women's 5 kilometres ===
Held on 19 September

Rank	Name	Nationality	Time	Notes
1st place, gold medalist(s)	Likina Amebaw	Ethiopia	14:41	SB
2nd place, silver medalist(s)	Caroline Makandi Gitonga	Kenya	14:48	
3rd place, bronze medalist(s)	Rose Davies	Australia	14:50	AR
4	Tayla Kavanagh	South Africa	14:51	PB
5	Aleshign Baweke	Ethiopia	14:53	SB
6	Marta García	Spain	14:59	PB
7	Georgia Griffith	Australia	15:01	PB
8	Samiya Hassan Nour	Djibouti	15:04	
9	Hannah Gapes	New Zealand	15:06	PB
10	Hannah Nuttall	Great Britain	15:08	PB
11	Charity Cherop	Uganda	15:09	PBPB
12	Allie Ostrander	United States	15:10	PB
13	Caroline Nyaga	Kenya	15:17	SBPB
14	Lisa Redlinger	Austria	15:18	NR
15	Megan Keith	Great Britain	15:19	PB
16	Diane van Es	Netherlands	15:24	
17	Courtney Frerichs	United States	15:25	
18	Francine Niyomukunzi	Burundi	15:28	
19	Martha Chemutai	Uganda	15:30	PB
20	Juliane Hvid	Denmark	15:33	
21	Nathalie Blomqvist	Finland	15:38	PB
22	Elżbieta Glinka	Poland	15:41	PB
23	Anna Marie Nordengen Sirevåg	Norway	15:41	
24	Kana Mizumoto	Japan	15:42	
25	Regan Yee	Canada	15:44	PB
26	Núbia Silva	Brazil	15:44	PB
27	Simone Plourde	Canada	15:46	
28	Rina Kusu	Japan	15:48	PB
29	Maiken Homlung Prøitz	Norway	16:06	SB
30	Farida Abaroge	ART	16:07	PB
31	Diana Shishay	Eritrea	16:08	PB
32	Zanthe Taljaard	South Africa	16:11	PB
33	Anna Emilie Møller	Denmark	16:19	
34	Viktoriia Shkurko	Ukraine	16:22	
35	Marla Valtierra	Mexico	16:40	PB
36	Alondra Negrón	Puerto Rico	16:48	SB
37	Danielė Šatikaitė	Lithuania	16:52	PB
38	Arian Chía	Mexico	16:59	PB
39	Vanessa Lee Ying Zhuang	Singapore	17:05	SB
40	Simone Ferraz	Brazil	17:21	
41	Nicole Low	Singapore	18:28	PB
42	Darija Krstevska	North Macedonia	19:22	PB

=== Mixed 5 kilometres team ===
Rank	Team	Time	Note
1st place, gold medalist(s)	Ethiopia	55:49	
2nd place, silver medalist(s)	Australia	56:30	
3rd place, bronze medalist(s)	Kenya	56:31	
4	United States	57:13	
5	Uganda	57:22	
6	South Africa	57:58	
7	Norway	58:03	
8	Japan	58:58	
9	Canada	59:17	
10	Denmark	59:31	
11	Brazil	1:00:46	
12	Singapore	1:04:44	

=== Men's mile ===
Held on 19 September

Rank	Name	Nationality	Time	Notes
1st place, gold medalist(s)	Robert Farken	Germany	3:51.80	WL
2nd place, silver medalist(s)	Yared Nuguse	United States	3:52.33	SB
3rd place, bronze medalist(s)	Ruben Querinjean	Luxembourg	3:52.77	NR
4	Anass Essayi	Morocco	3:53.28	PB
5	Flavien Szot	France	3:53.44	NR
6	Olli Hoare	Australia	3:53.65	AR
7	Pietro Arese	Italy	3:54.37	PB
8	Vincent Ciattei	United States	3:54.62	=SB
9	Jude Thomas	Australia	3:54.92	
10	Tshepo Tshite	South Africa	3:55.66	PB
11	Jake Heyward	Great Britain	3:55.76	PB
12	Sam Tanner	New Zealand	3:56.01	NR
13	Foster Malleck	Canada	3:56.55	PB
14	Brian Komen	Kenya	3:56.61	PB
15	Martín Segurola	Spain	3:56.92	PB
16	Ojiro Honda	Japan	3:57.50	PB
17	Stefan Nillessen	Netherlands	3:57.84	NR
18	Cathal Doyle	Ireland	3:58.40	
19	Ruben Verheyden	Belgium	3:58.47	NR
20	Fouad Messaoudi	Morocco	3:58.77	PB
21	Žan Rudolf	Slovenia	3:58.85	NR
22	Abraham Alvarado	Mexico	3:58.89	PB
23	Andreas Fjeld Halvorsen	Norway	3:59.42	PB
24	Rasmus Kisel	Estonia	3:59.77	NR
25	Kyumbe Munguti	Kenya	3:59.89	PB
26	Archie Davis	Great Britain	3:59.89	PB
27	Rok Markelj	Slovenia	3:59.97	PB
28	Romain Mornet	France	4:00.02	SB
29	Christoffer Frost Johansen	Denmark	4:00.84	PB
30	Santtu Heikkinen	Finland	4:01.73	SB
31	Pol Moya	Andorra	4:01.91	NR
32	Gustav Bendsen	Denmark	4:02.07	PB
33	Moa Abounnachat Bollerød	Norway	4:02.63	PB
34	Silas Chemutai	Uganda	4:03.51	PB
35	Dumisani Motloung	South Africa	4:04.21	PB
36	Guilherme Kurtz	Brazil	4:04.55	SB
37	István Szögi	Hungary	4:04.98	PB
38	Nino Jambrešić	Croatia	4:06.46	PB
39	Hosea Kiprop	Uganda	4:07.22	PB
40	André Sales	Brazil	4:07.79	SB
41	Andrew Coscoran	Ireland	4:07.95	PB
42	Dmytrii Nikolaichuk	Ukraine	4:08.29	
43	Max Davies	Canada	4:08.56	
44	Tomoki Nakano	Japan	4:09.17	PB
45	Roberts Aleksis Glazers	Latvia	4:10.10	
46	Fidelio Klein	Luxembourg	4:11.85	
47	Fitsum Abrham	Eritrea	4:13.48	PB
48	Georgios Matzaridis	Greece	4:13.70	PB
49	Sten Ütsmüts	Estonia	4:14.49	PB
50	Carlos Vilches	Puerto Rico	4:14.59	SB
51	Martin Balabanov	Bulgaria	4:15.26	PB
52	Ryan Adams	Mexico	4:18.59	PB
53	Jairo Moreira	Uruguay	4:19.68	PB
54	Nikita Bogdanovs	Latvia	4:20.28	
55	Mauro Delgue	Uruguay	4:29.31	PB
56	Ivan Andreev	Bulgaria	4:30.42	PB
57	Jacob Tan	Singapore	4:41.73	PB
58	Oliver Lim Tze Rong	Singapore	4:44.32	PB

=== Women's mile ===
Held on 19 September

Rank	Name	Nationality	Time	Notes
1st place, gold medalist(s)	Agathe Guillemot	France	4:22.74	WL
2nd place, silver medalist(s)	Freweyni Hailu	Ethiopia	4:24.35	SB
3rd place, bronze medalist(s)	Mirriam Cherop	Kenya	4:25.71	SB
4	Annemarie Nissen	Denmark	4:26.78	PB
5	Naomi Korir	Kenya	4:29.15	PB
6	Adelle Tracey	Jamaica	4:29.30	PB
7	Linden Hall	Australia	4:29.36	AR
8	Lucia Stafford	Canada	4:29.51	PB
9	Gabriela Debues-Stafford	Canada	4:30.59	PB
10	Addison Wiley	United States	4:31.02	
11	Gracie Hyde	United States	4:31.92	
12	Sarah Billings	Australia	4:32.68	PB
13	Sarah Healy	Ireland	4:32.98	PB
14	Vera Sjöberg	Sweden	4:33.05	PB
15	Karabo More	South Africa	4:33.27	PB
16	Katie Snowden	Great Britain	4:33.44	
17	Weronika Lizakowska	Poland	4:34.27	NR
18	Delia Sclabas	Switzerland	4:35.48	PB
19	Wilma Nielsen	Sweden	4:35.73	PB
20	Vera Bertemes-Hoffmann	Luxembourg	4:36.16	
21	Laura Nicholson	Ireland	4:36.16	PB
22	Fatima Ezzahra Birdaha	Morocco	4:36.74	PB
23	Joceline Wind	Switzerland	4:38.17	
24	Kristiina Sasínek Mäki	Czech Republic	4:38.39	PB
25	Mariska Parewyck	Belgium	4:39.43	NR
26	Augustine Haquet	France	4:40.14	PB
27	Sarah Calvert	Great Britain	4:40.98	PB
28	Ludovica Cavalli	Italy	4:41.55	PB
29	Birke Haylom	Ethiopia	4:42.28	PB
30	Patience Cherop	Uganda	4:43.22	PB
31	Carina Viljoen	South Africa	4:43.28	SB
32	Kanari Estifanos	Eritrea	4:45.35	PB
33	Felister Chekwemoi	Uganda	4:47.48	PB
34	Claire Uwitonze	Rwanda	4:48.50	PB
35	Soukaina Hajji	Morocco	4:49.23	PB
36	Alison Andrews-Paul	New Zealand	4:50.77	PB
37	Kimberley May	New Zealand	4:50.99	PB
38	July da Silva	Brazil	4:53.71	SB
39	Marine Joblin	Luxembourg	4:54.95	PB
40	Mia Ivana Cabrera	Mexico	4:55.11	PB
41	Jaqueline Weber	Brazil	4:57.14	SB
42	Mia Helene Mørck	Denmark	4:59.53	SB
43	Kelly Nevolihhin	Estonia	5:06.16	
44	Julieta Firpo	Uruguay	5:15.41	SB
45	Alessandra Rodríguez	Puerto Rico	5:18.73	PB
46	Līga Velvere-Krūmiņa	Latvia	5:28.35	SB
47	Romaine Soh Rui-min	Singapore	5:32.75	SB
48	Agathe Julien	Monaco	6:17.33	PB

=== Mixed mile team ===
Rank	Team	Time	Note
1st place, gold medalist(s)	United States	16:49.89	
2nd place, silver medalist(s)	Australia	16:50.61	
3rd place, bronze medalist(s)	Kenya	16:51.36	
4	France	16:56.34	
5	Canada	17:05.21	
6	Great Britain	17:10.07	
7	Ireland	17:15.49	
8	South Africa	17:16.42	
9	Morocco	17:18.02	
10	Denmark	17:29.22	
11	Luxembourg	17:35.73	
12	Uganda	17:41.43	
13	Brazil	18:03.19	

== Participation ==
- Algeria (1)
- Andorra (2)
- Argentina (2)
- Armenia (1)
- ART (4)
- Australia (14)
- Austria (4)
- Azerbaijan (1)
- Belgium (8)
- Bhutan (1)
- Bolivia (2)
- Brazil (14)
- Bulgaria (4)
- Burundi (7)
- Canada (16)
- Chile (1)
- China (8)
- Colombia (2)
- Comoros (1)
- Costa Rica (1)
- Croatia (2)
- Denmark (15)
- Djibouti (2)
- Eritrea (10)
- Estonia (4)
- Ethiopia (14)
- Federated States of Micronesia (1)
- Finland (2)
- France (13)
- Georgia (1)
- Germany (1)
- Great Britain (13)
- Germany (2)
- Guatemala (1)
- Honduras (3)
- Hungary (2)
- Iceland (2)
- Ireland (8)
- Italy (9)
- Jordan (1)
- Jamaica (1)
- Japan (14)
- Kenya (16)
- Latvia (7)
- Lithuania (7)
- Luxembourg (4)
- Macau (2)
- Malta (2)
- Mauritius (1)
- Mexico (14)
- Monaco (2)
- Moldova (1)
- Morocco (9)
- Netherlands (5)
- New Zealand (11)
- North Macedonia (1)
- Norway (10)
- Peru (3)
- Poland (3)
- Portugal (5)
- Puerto Rico (6)
- Romania (1)
- Rwanda (4)
- El Salvador (1)
- Singapore (14)
- Slovakia (1)
- Slovenia (5)
- South Africa (14)
- South Sudan (1)
- Spain (4)
- Sweden (5)
- Switzerland (5)
- Tanzania (4)
- Uganda (16)
- Ukraine (6)
- United States (18)
- United States Virgin Islands (2)
- United States (18)
- Uruguay (5)
