= Emma Grace Hurley =

American long-distance runner (born 1997)

Personal information
- Born: 19 December 1997 (age 28)

Sport
- Sport: Athletics
- Events: Long distance running, Cross country running
Medal record
Women's athletics
Representing United States
World Road Running Championships
Gold medal – first place	2026 Copenhagen	Half marathon team

Emma Grace Hurley (born 19 December 1997) is an American long-distance and cross country runner. She was runner-up at the 2024 USA Cross Country Championships and represented the United States at the 2024 World Athletics Cross Country Championships. In 2026, she won the USATF 10-Mile national title and set an American national record over 8 km.

== Biography ==
Hurley graduated from Furman University in 2020 with her final track season canceled due to the Covid-19 pandemic. In her time at Furman she won an indoor conference title over 3000 metres and competed at the NCAA Cross Country Championships. After graduation she began training with the Atlanta Track Club in November 2021, working with coaches Amy and Andrew Begley.

In March 2023, Hurley was runner-up at the USATF 15 km Championships in Jacksonville, Florida, finishing behind Emily Sisson. That year, she placed third at the USATF 10-Mile Championships at the Credit Union Cherry Blossom 10-Miler in Washington, D.C., and finished third at the USATF 10 km Championships at the Great Cow Harbor 10-K behind Weini Kelati and Ednah Kurgat.

Hurley placed second at the 2024 USA Cross Country Championships. She subsequently represented the United States at the 2024 World Athletics Cross Country Championships in Belgrade, Serbia. In November 2024, Hurley finished third at the USATF 5K Championships in New York City, which helped her win the 2024 USATF Running Circuit title. That month, she won at the Indianapolis Half Marathon ahead of Julia Paternain, setting a course record in her debut race at the distance, running a time of 1:08:26 which placed her twelfth on the American all-time list.

In March 2025, she placed second behind Taylor Roe at the USA half marathon championships in Atlanta, Georgia. She ran 1:08:02 for the half marathon in Valencia, Spain in October 2025.

On 1 March 2026, she placed twelfth at the USA Half Marathon Championships in Atlanta, Georgia, in a controversial race in which she was one of a number of athletes directed to the wrong section of the course at the 12 mile mark as they followed the lead vehicle and a motorcycle with a television camera operator, when she had been one of the three leading athletes. Later that month, she set a new American record in the 8K road race taking seven seconds from the 21-year-old previous record held by Deena Kastor by winning the women’s title in 24:29 at the Shamrock Shuffle 8K in Chicago. On 12 April, Hurley won the USATF 10-Mile national title at the Cherry Blossom 10 Mile in Washington DC. She was subsequently selected for the United States team for the World Road Running Championships in Copenhagen, Denmark.

In August 2026, Hurley placed fourth at the ASICS Falmouth Road Race. Competing at the 2026 World Athletics Road Running Championships in Copenhagen on 20 September, she placed fifth in the half marathon in a women's-only American record of 1:06:23. With the performance she also led the United States to the team silver medal in the event. Following Veronica Loleo's doping disqualification on 19 November, Hurley was upgraded to fourth individually and a team gold.

On 11 October 2026, Hurley broke the all-time marathon debut record for an American woman, finishing as the top American woman and seventh woman overall in the Chicago marathon, with a time of 2:20:47.

== Personal life ==
From Roswell, Georgia, she has coached high school athletes outside of her own running career, as well as working in sales. She was later based in Indianapolis and a member of Heartland Track Club. In 2024, she signed a professional contract with Asics.
