= Charles Kiboino =

Kenyan athlete (born 2006)

Personal information
- Born: 21 December 2006 (age 19)

Sport
- Sport: Athletics
- Event: Long-distance running
Medal record
Men's athletics
Representing Kenya
World Road Running Championships
Bronze medal – third place	2026 Copenhagen	5k mixed team

Charles Kiboino (born 21 December 2006) is a Kenya long distance runner. He won the Kenyan Championships over 10,000 metres in 2026.

== Biography ==
Kiboino finished in third place in the men's 10,000 metres race at the 2026 Kip Keino Classic in 28:37.81. He ran a time of 27:22.80 at the Emil Zátopek Memorial in Czechia on 15 June, finishing third in the 10,000 metres, and a time 28:21.52 for 10,000 metres at the Kenyan Championships and trials for the Commonwealth Games on 19 June 2026. He was named for his Diamond League debut at the 2026 Athletissima in Lausanne on 21 August, placing fifteenth over 5000 metres. He was selected to represent Kenya in the 5k at the World Athletics Road Running Championships on 19 September 2026 in Copenhagen, winning the bronze medal in the mixed team event alongside Caroline Gitonga, Caroline Nyaga and Mathew Kipchumba Kipsang. In November, he placed second at the Cross Internacional de Itálica in Seville and fourth at Cross Internacional de Soria on the 2026-27 World Athletics Cross Country Tour.
