= Kena Tufa =

Ethiopian steeplechaser

Personal information
- Born: 27 December 2005 (age 20)

Sport
- Sport: Athletics
- Event: Steeplechase

Achievements and titles
- Personal best: 3000m S'chase: 8:59.66 (2026)

Kena Tufa (born 27 December 2005) is an Ethiopian steeplechaser. She won the Ethiopian Athletics Championships in the 3000 metres steeplechase in 2026.

== Biography ==
In July 2024, Tufa placed third in the 3000 metres steeplechase at the Ethiopian U20 Championships in 9:43.30. The following year she placed second in 9:31.72 for the 3000 metres steeplechase at the 2025 Kip Keino Classic in Nairobi.

In November 2025, she placed second behind Gela Hambese in the 2k Ethiopian trial race at the Janmeda Cross Country Championships held in Addis Ababa, and was announced in the Ethiopian pool for the mixed relay for the 2026 World Athletics Cross Country Championships. However, the Ethiopian team was beset by VISA issues resulting in many of the squad being unable to travel to take part.

Tufa won the Ethiopian Athletics Championships in the 3000 metres steeplechase in March 2026, running 9:39.38. On 16 May, Tufa improved her personal best by more than 30 seconds to place fourth in the 3000 m steeplechase at the 2026 Shanghai Diamond League in 8:59.66. In doing so, she became the 17th women to break nine minutes for the distance. The following week, she placed fifth in the discipline at the 2026 Xiamen Diamond League. On 7 June, she placed fourth in the 3000 m steeplechase at the Diamond League event in Stockholm. Competing in the Diamond League at the 2026 Athletissima in Lausanne, Switzerland on 21 August 2026, she placed sixth in the 3000 m steeplechase. At the 2026 Diamond League Final in Brussels in September, she placed seventh in the 3000 metres steeplechase.
