= Alex Matata =

Kenyan long-distance runner

Personal information
- Full name: Alex Nzioka Matata
- Born: 27 July 1997 (age 29)

Sport
- Country: Kenya
- Sport: Long-distance running
- Event: Half Marathon

Achievements and titles
- Personal bests: 15K: 41:43 (Nijmegen 2025); Half Marathon: 59:11 (Yangzhou 2026)
Medal record
Men's athletics
Representing Kenya
World Road Running Championships
| Gold medal – first place | 2026 Copenhagen | Half marathon team |

Alex Nzioka Matata (born 27 July 1997) is a Kenyan long-distance runner.

In 2025 Matata won the Ras Al Khaimah Half Marathon, the Meishan Renshou Half Marathon, the Yangzhou Half Marathon, the Istanbul Half Marathon, and the Delhi Half Marathon where he had placed 2nd the previous year in 2024.

In 2026, Matata defended his titles at the Meishan, Yangzhou, and Istanbul Half Marathons setting a new personal best in the Yangzhou Half Marathon and he also claimed victory in the Boilermaker Road Race 15k. He then joined Nicholas Kipkorir Kimeli and Gideon Rono at the 2026 World Athletics Road Running Championships to run the men's half marathon team event and their combined performances captured gold for Kenya.
