= Kaylee Mitchell =

American athlete (born 1999)

Personal information
- Nationality: American
- Born: October 22, 1999 (age 26) Germany

Sport
- Sport: Athletics
- Event: Steeplechase

Achievements and titles
- Personal best(s): 1500m: 4:06.39 (2025); Mile: 4:27.34 (2025); 3000m: 8:51.06 (2023); 5000m: 15:15.80 (2025); 3000m Steeplechase: 9:08.66 (2025)

Kaylee Mitchell (born 22 October 1999) is an American steeplechaser. She placed third in the 3000 metres steeplechase at the 2025 USA Outdoor Track and Field Championships.

== Early life ==
She was born in Germany into a military family and has dual-citizenship with the United States. She attended Astoria High School in Oregon and Sprague High School in Salem, Oregon. She competed at the collegiate level for Seattle Pacific University before transferring to Oregon State University where she studied nutrition. She won all-American honours ten times, a programme record for the Oregon State Beavers.

== Career ==
She won the 1500 metres at the Oregon Twilight meet in May 2023 in 4:14.76. She placed sixth at the 2023 USATF Outdoor Championships in the 3000 metres steeplechase.

In March 2024, Mitchell signed a professional contract with Nike and joined the Bowerman Track Club under coach Jerry Schumacher. She ran to an eighth place finish with a personal best time of 9:21.00 seconds at the 2024 Prefontaine Classic in the 3000 m steeplechase. She won her qualifying heat at the 2024 US Olympic Trials, before placing fifth in the final in a new personal best time of 9:14.05.

She ran a personal best time of 9:08.66 for the 3000m steeplechase at the 2025 Prefontaine Classic on 5 July. Later that month, she ran a new 1500 metres personal best of 4:06.39 in Portland, Oregon. She reached the final of the 3000 metres steeplechase at the 2025 USA Outdoor Track and Field Championships, placing third in the final behind Lexy Halladay-Lowry and Angelina Napoleon in a time of 9:11.36.

She was selected for the American team for the 2025 World Athletics Championships in Tokyo, Japan, running 9:15.52 to qualify for the final of the 3000 metres steeplechase before placing tenth in the final.
