= Gabrielle Jennings =

American athlete (born 1998)

- Jennings in 2026

Personal information
- Nationality: American
- Born: September 15, 1998 (age 28)

Sport
- Sport: Athletics
- Event: Steeplechase

Achievements and titles
- Personal bests: 3000m Steeplechase: 9:06.61 (Eugene, 2025)
Medal record
Women's athletics
Representing the United States
NACAC Championships
Gold medal – first place	2022 Freeport	3000 m steeplechase

Gabrielle Jennings (born September 15, 1998) is an American track and field athlete. She was the gold medalist in the 3000m steeplechase at the 2022 NACAC Championships.

== Early life ==
From Slidell, Louisiana, where she attended First Baptist Christian School. She left high school with 44 Louisiana state titles in track and field and cross-country. She then studied Communication and Studio Art (emphasis in Graphic Design) at Furman University.

== Career ==
Jennings graduated from Furman University and turned pro in 2021. In her final collegiate meet at the 2021 NCAA Division I Outdoor Track and Field Championships, held in Eugene, Oregon, she ran a new personal best of 9:38.88 in the semi-final of the 3000m steeplechase to reach the final. In the final she set a new personal best time of 9:38.24. She left College athletics as a three-time All-American, having earned the distinction in cross country, indoor, and outdoor track.

She finished fourth at the 2022 USA Outdoor Track and Field Championships in the steeplechase in 2022 running a new personal best time of 9:25.05. She represented her country at the 2022 NACAC Championships in the steeplechase in 2022, where she set a new championship record time of 9:34.36 to win the gold medal.

She ran a new personal best for the 3000m steeplechase of 9.07.70 at the Rome Diamond League event in August 2024.

She competed in the 3000 metres steeplechase at the 2025 Meeting de Paris in June 2025, running a time of 9:08.05 to place fourth overall. She ran a personal best 9:06.61 at the 2025 Prefontaine Classic on 5 July. She reached the final of the 3000 metres steeplechase at the 2025 USA Outdoor Track and Field Championships. She placed fifth in the 3000 metres steeplechase at the Diamond League Final in Zurich on 28 August.

On 7 June 2026, Jennings placed third in the 3000 m steeplechase at the 2026 Diamond League event in Stockholm. Later that month, she ran a meeting record 9:11.72 to win the 3000 m steeplechase at the LA Grand Prix. On 26 July, she was runner-up to Lexy Halladay at the 2026 USA Championships in New York. Competing in the Diamond League at the 2026 Athletissima in Lausanne, Switzerland on 21 August 2026, she placed seventh. At the 2026 Diamond League Final in Brussels in September, she placed eighth in the 3000 metres steeplechase.

== Personal life ==
Jennings is based in Boulder, Colorado.
