= Boilermaker Road Race =

Road running race in the United States

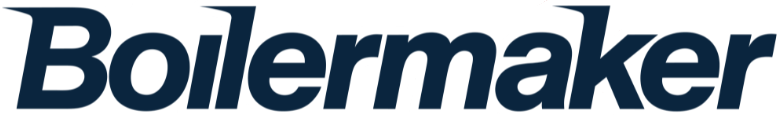
- Boilermaker Logo
- Date: annual
- Location: Utica, NY
- Event type: Road running
- Distance: 15K
- Established: 1978
- Course records: Men's footrace: 42:06; Women's footrace: 47:33; Men's wheelchair: 31:33; Women's wheelchair: 39:11
- Website: www.boilermaker.com

The Boilermaker Road Race is a USATF-certified 15-kilometer (9.3 mi) foot race and wheelchair race held annually in Utica, New York, United States. Although local recreational runners are the majority of entrants, the race is highly competitive, with international professional runners filling the top ranks. With the exception of 2020, when it was cancelled due to the COVID-19 pandemic, the Boilermaker has been held every year since 1978. Traditionally, the Boilermaker is held on the second Sunday in July, although the 2021 Boilermaker was held on October 10 due to COVID-related concerns. Although 15Ks are uncommon compared to other road races, the Boilermaker has been rated highly by running publications.

The race course is primarily in the city of Utica, with the earlier portion largely within the Utica Parks and Parkway Historic District. The course passes through the suburbs New Hartford and Yorkville near Utica University. The course is hilly, changing 300 feet in elevation over its length: combined with the mid-summer heat, winning race times are generally longer than for other 15K races. The finish line lies outside the F.X. Matt Brewery, where post-race festivities are held.

Like many urban races in the United States, the Boilermaker was created during the 1970s running boom. The first Boilermaker was held on July 16, 1978, with a budget of $750 and 800 local runners participating. The name alludes to a primary underwriter of the race, the Utica Radiator Corporation (now Utica Boilers, part of ECR International), whose main offices are near the race starting line. The wheelchair section was added in 1980. The race gained prominence in 1983 when American distance runner Bill Rodgers won with a time of 44:38. From 1997 to 2006, the Boilermaker was known as the largest 15K race in the United States, but was overtaken by the Gate River Run in Jacksonville, Florida, in later years.

The Boilermaker has been described as an essential part of the identity of its host city, Utica, like the Peachtree Road Race in Atlanta, Georgia. Semi-unofficial performances and parties fill the sidewalk along much of the race course: Runners World magazine described the Boilermaker as "part road race, part festival."

== Past winners ==
Footrace
Edition	Year	Men's winner	Time (m:s)	Women's winner	Time (m:s)
1st	1978	Ric Rojas (USA)	45:38	Kathy Mills (USA)	54:26
2nd	1979	Tom Carter (USA)	47:15	Cynthia Girard (USA)	57:30
3rd	1980	Peter Pfitzinger (USA)	45:16	Nancy Mieszczak (USA)	55:02
4th	1981	Terry Baker (USA)	44:48	Mary Rybinski (USA)	54:49
5th	1982	John O'Connell (USA)	44:58	Laura DeWald (USA)	54:41
6th	1983	Bill Rodgers (USA)	44:38	Ena Weinstein (PER)	53:22
7th	1984	Geoff Smith (GBR)	44:21	Ena Weinstein (PER)	52:37
8th	1985	Jerry Kiernan (IRL)	44:42	Judi St. Hilaire (USA)	50:35
9th	1986	Joseph Kipsang (KEN)	44:07	Lisa Brady (USA)	50:19
10th	1987	Mark Roberts (GBR)	45:10	Rebecca Kirsininkas (USA)	54:10
11th	1988	Joseph Kipsang (KEN)	44:55	Ria Van Landeghem (BEL)	52:45
12th	1989	Jon Sinclair (USA)	44:06	Michelle Bush (CAY)	52:35
13th	1990	Delmir dos Santos (BRA)	44:01	Maria Trujillo (USA)	51:39
14th	1991	Ed Eyestone (USA)	44:10	Jill Boltz (GBR)	48:19
15th	1992	Sammy Lelei (KEN)	43:39	Madina Biktagirova (RUS)	50:22
16th	1993	Thomas Osano (KEN)	43:39	Gitte Karlshøj (DEN)	51:07
17th	1994	Benson Maya (KEN)	42:57	Delillah Asiago (KEN)	50:24
18th	1995	Lazarus Nyakeraka (KEN)	43:09	Roseli Machado (BRA)	49:42
19th	1996	Joseph Kimani (KEN)	42:40	Catherine Ndereba (KEN)	48:55
20th	1997	Joseph Kimani (KEN)	42:54	Lornah Kiplagat (KEN)	49:58
21st	1998	Khalid Khannouchi (MAR)	42:57	Lornah Kiplagat (KEN)	49:58
22nd	1999	John Korir Kipsang (KEN)	43:00	Catherine Ndereba (KEN)	48:52
23rd	2000	Reuben Cheruiyot (KEN)	43:07	Catherine Ndereba (KEN)	48:47
24th	2001	John Korir Kipsang (KEN)	42:57	Catherine Ndereba (KEN)	48:06
25th	2002	Paul Malakwen Kosgei (KEN)	43:22	Constantina Diţă (ROM)	48:29
26th	2003	John Korir Kipsang (KEN)	43:23	Susan Chepkemei (KEN)	48:55
27th	2004	John Korir Kipsang (KEN)	43:50	Susan Chepkemei (KEN)	48:50
28th	2005	Gilbert Okari (KEN)	43:22	Sally Barsosio (KEN)	50:11
29th	2006	Samuel Rongo Olengura (KEN)	43:16	Getenesh Wami (ETH)	49:31
30th	2007	Nicholas Manza Kamakya (KEN)	43:51	Lidia Șimon (ROM)	49:23
31st	2008	Terefe Maregu (ETH)	44:17	Ashu Kasim Rabo (ETH)	50:39
32nd	2009	Ridouane Harroufi (MAR)	43:56	Alice Timbilili (KEN)	49:32
33rd	2010	Lelisa Desisa (ETH)	42:46	Edna Kiplagat (KEN)	47:57
34th	2011	Ridouane Harroufi (MAR)	43:30	Alice Timbilili (KEN)	48:41
35th	2012	Tilahun Regassa (ETH)	43:01	Mamitu Daska (ETH)	49:26
36th	2013	Julius Kipyego Keter (KEN)	43:55	Lineth Chepkurui (KEN)	50:33
37th	2014	Geoffrey Kenisi Bundi (KEN)	44:18	Mary Wacera Ngugi (KEN)	50:13
38th	2015	Eliud Ngetich (KEN)	43:31	Mary Wacera Ngugi (KEN)	48:49
39th	2016	Teshome Mekonen (ETH)	43:58	Cynthia Limo (KEN)	48:50
40th	2017	Silas Kipruto (KEN)	43:54	Mary Wacera Ngugi (KEN)	49:17
41st	2018	Gabriel Geay (TAN)	43:40	Mary Wacera Ngugi (KEN)	50:01
42nd	2019	Gabriel Geay (TAN)	43:35	Caroline Rotich (KEN)	49:03
43rd	2020	Cancelled			
44th	2021	Stephen Rathbun (USA)	47:32	Savannah Boucher (USA)	56:24
45th	2022	Jemal Yimer Mekonnen (ETH)	42:38	Rosemary Wanjiru (KEN)	48:54
46th	2023	Jemal Yimer Mekonnen (ETH)	42:06	Jesca Chelangat (KEN)	47:33
47th	2024	John Korir (KEN)	42:11	Grace Loibach Nawowuna (KEN)	49:18
48th	2025	John Korir (KEN)	42:44	Veronica Loleo (NED)	49:36
49th	2026	Alex Matata (KEN)	42:24	Tsigie Gebreselama (ETH)	47:29

Wheelchair
Edition	Year	Men's winner	Time (m:s)	Women's winner	Time (m:s)
25th	2002	Kamel Ayari (TUN)	36:53	April B. Coughlin (USA)	50:53
26th	2003	Saúl Mendoza (MEX)	35:09	Jessica Galli (USA)	47:35
27th	2004	Saúl Mendoza (MEX)	31:49	Jessica Galli (USA)	45:36
28th	2005	Tyler Byers (USA)	39:31	Shirley Reilly (USA)	44:35
29th	2006	Saúl Mendoza (MEX)	34:18	None	N/A
30th	2007	Krige Schabort (RSA)	32:52	Anjali Forber-Pratt (USA)	49:13
31st	2008	Krige Schabort (RSA)	32:57	Jacqui Kapinowski (USA)	1:03:40
32nd	2009	Krige Schabort (RSA)	36:52	Ellie G. O'Neill (USA)	1:09:58
33rd	2010	Krige Schabort (RSA)	32:59	Anjali Forber-Pratt (USA)	49:23
34th	2011	Krige Schabort (RSA)	33:16	Amanda McGrory (USA)	39:11
35th	2012	Matthew Lack (NZL)	36:41	Amanda McGrory (USA)	39:33
36th	2013	Joshua Cassidy (CAN)	34:11	None	N/A
37th	2014	Josh George (USA)	34:10	Amanda McGrory (USA)	41:10
38th	2015	Joshua Cassidy (CAN)	32:52	Amanda McGrory (USA)	40:08
39th	2016	Daniel Romanchuk (USA)	35:09	Amanda McGrory (USA)	41:43
40th	2017	Daniel Romanchuk (USA)	33:05	Amanda McGrory (USA)	37:40
41st	2018	Daniel Romanchuk (USA)	31:45	Amanda McGrory (USA)	40:00
42nd	2019	Daniel Romanchuk (USA)	32:32	Jenna Fesemyer (USA)	43:07
43rd	2020	Cancelled			
44th	2021	Hermin Garic (USA)	35:35	Stephanie Woodward (USA)	1:34:13
45th	2022	Daniel Romanchuk (USA)	31:33	Jenna Fesemyer (USA)	43:01
46th	2023	Joshua Cassidy (CAN)	33:10	Jenna Fesemyer (USA)	40:32
47th	2024	Joshua Cassidy (CAN)	34:05	Hoda Elshorbagy (EGY)	40:25
48th	2025	Miguel Jimenez Vergara (USA)	34:50	Hoda Elshorbagy (EGY)	41:45
49th	2026	Joshua Cassidy (CAN)	33:24	Hoda Elshorbagy (EGY)	41:51

Key: Course record United States championship race

Due to COVID-19 concerns, international professional runners were not invited to the 2021 race. Thus, the winning times in that year's race are longer than in prior years, with Americans taking first place in both divisions for the first time since 1991. The field in the wheelchair race was also much smaller that year, consisting of only four competitors, all from New York State.

The John Korir who won the 2024 and 2025 races is not the same as John Korir Kipsang, who won the 1999, 2001, 2003 and 2004 races.
