= Caroline Gitonga =

Kenyan long-distance runner (born 1996)

Personal information
- Full name: Caroline Makandi Gitonga
- Nationality: Kenyan
- Born: 12 May 1996 (age 30)

Sport
- Sport: Athletics
- Event: Long-distance running
Medal record
Women's athletics
Representing Kenya
World Road Running Championships
| Silver medal – second place | 2026 Copenhagen | 5k |
| Bronze medal – third place | 2026 Copenhagen | 5k mixed team |

Caroline Makandi Gitonga (born 12 May 1996) is a Kenyan long-distance runner. She was a silver medalist at the World Athletics Road Running Championships in 2026.

== Biography ==
Gitonga moved inside the top 10 of the world all-time list in the women's 10 k road running, after setting a new personal best at 10K Facsa Castellón in Spain, with a time of 29:34, in February 2026. The time beat her previous personal best of 30:46 at the previous edition of the World Athletics Label road race in 2025. Gitonga went on to set further personal bests in 2026; running 1:06:16 for the half marathon and 14:26 for 5km. Gitonga was selected to represent Kenya in the 5k at the World Athletics Road Running Championships on 19 September 2026 in Copenhagen, winning the silver medal behind Likina Amebaw of Ethiopia, running in 14:48. She also won the bronze medal in the mixed team event alongside Mathew Kipsang, Caroline Nyaga and Charles Kiboino. On 25 October, she placed sixth at the Valencia half marathon in a personal best of 1:04:59.

== Personal life ==
From the Kibirichia ward in Buuri Sub County, Meru County, Kenya, her twin sister Purity Kajuju Gitonga is also a competitive distance runner.
