= Jude Thomas (runner) =

Australian middle-distance runner

- Thomas at the 2024 Bislett Games

Personal information
- Born: 17 March 2002 (age 24)

Sport
- Sport: Athletics
- Event: Middle-distance running

Achievements and titles
- Personal bests: 1500m: 3:32.07 (2025); Mile: 3:51.19 (2025); 3000m: 7:39.69 (2025); 5000m: 13:09.36 (2025)
Medal record
Men's athletics
Representing Australia
World Road Running Championships
Silver medal – second place	2026 Copenhagen	Mile mixed team

Jude Thomas (born 17 March 2002) is an Australian middle-distance runner. He has won Australian national titles over 3000 metres and in the mile run.

== Biography ==
Coached by Collis Birmingham, he is a member of Melbourne Track Club. Racing at the 2021 Australian 3000m Championships, Thomas set a then Australian Under 20 record of 7:52.11, breaking the previous record of Ryan Gregson by over five seconds. He also won the U20 national titles in the 1,500m and 5,000m in 2021. In June 2021 he broke the Australian Parkrun record, running a 14:02 5 km in Kedron, Queensland.

He won the national title over 3000 metres at the Sydney Classic in March 2022. The following season saw Thomas defending his title in 2023, in a time of 7:48.25 and still just at the age of 20 years-old. In 2024, he ran a 1500m personal best of 3:37.77 at the Adelaide Invitational in May 2024 before also running a 5000m personal best of 13:33.60 at the Maurie Plant Meet in Melbourne in December 2024.

In the northern hemisphere winter of 2025 Thomas ran personal best times with an indoor 5000m in Boston, Massachusetts in 13:09.36, and a 3:51.19 performance in a mile race in Seattle. The results placed him in the top-five in Australia for both events. He won the Mile run at the Australian Road Mile Championships in Ballarat in April 2025. He competed over 5000 metres at the 2025 Shanghai Diamond League event in China on 3 May 2025. He set a meeting record to win the Golden Grand Prix in Tokyo, Japan, running the 3000m in 7:39.69 on 18 May 2025. He finished tenth in the 1500 metres at the 2025 Meeting International Mohammed VI d'Athlétisme de Rabat, part of the 2025 Diamond League, in May 2025 in a personal best 3:33.35.

In September 2025, he competed over 1500 metres at the 2025 World Championships in Tokyo, Japan, without advancing to the semi-finals.

In May 2026, Thomas won the Australian Road Mile Championship. Competing in the mile run at the World Athletics Road Running Championships on 19 September 2026, Thomas ran 3:54.92 to place ninth overall, winning the silver medal with the Australian team in the mixed event.

== Personal life ==
He is from Ipswich, Queensland and attended St Edmund's College. His father Michael Thomas is an athletics photographer and ultramarathon runner.
