= Victor Kimosop =

Kenyan athlete (born 2003)

Personal information
- Nationality: Kenyan
- Born: 2 March 2003 (age 23)

Sport
- Sport: Athletics
- Event(s): Long-distance running, Cross country running

Achievements and titles
- Personal best(s): 5000m: 13:59.26 (Nairobi, 2025); 10,000m: 28:44.43 (Nairobi, 2025)

Victor Kimosop (born 2 March 2003) is a Kenyan long-distance and cross country runner.

== Career ==
Kimosop is from Central Rift Refion of Kenya, but later based himself in Japan, before becoming a member of Benfica in Portugal.

Kimosop won the Nairobi Region Cross Country race in Kenya in January 2025 at the age of 21 years-of-age. He finished eighth over 10,000 metres at the Kip Keino Classic in May 2025. The following month, he placed ninth overall over 5000 metres at the Kenyan Athletics Championships.

On 11 October 2025, he won the 2025 Betika Cross Country in Kericho County. On 8 November 2025, he was runner-up to compatriot Mathew Kipsang at the Cardiff Cross Challenge in Wales, a World Athletics Cross Country Tour gold label event. Later that month he was first across the line competing for Benfica at the Portuguese Cross Country Championships. In February 2026, he placed fourth at the Almond Blossom Cross Country race, in Albufeira, Portugal. He placed sixth over 10,000 metres at the 2026 Kip Keino Classic.
