= Lexy Halladay-Lowry =

American long-distance runner (born 2001)

- At the 2026 Weltklasse Zürich

Personal information
- Born: 23 July 2001 (age 25)

Sport
- Sport: Athletics
- Events: Long-distance running, Steeplechase

Achievements and titles
- Personal bests: 3000m 8:38.78 (2026); 5000m 14:52.93 (2025); 3000m steeplechase 9:05.36 (2026)

Lexy Halladay-Lowry (born 23 July 2001) is an American long-distance and steeplechase runner. She won the 3000 metres steeplechase at the 2025 and 2026 USA Outdoor Track and Field Championships.

== Early life ==
She attended Mountain View High School in Meridian, Idaho, where she won 9 state titles and placed 4th at the Foot Locker Nationals.

== Career ==
In 2023, she ran a personal best time of 9:41.85 for 4th in the NCAA in the 3000 metres steeplechase, then improved to 9:31.39 to finish in eighth place at the USATF Championships.

During the 2024 indoor season, she won the Big 12 title over 3000 metres and placed fifth at the 2024 NCAA Division I Indoor Track and Field Championships in the 5000 metres, and then fourth in the 3000 metres. In April, she won the 3000 m steeplechase at the Bryan Clay Invitational in 9:26.55 ahead of Gracie Hyde. In June 2024, She improved her personal bets to 15:02.89 in the 5000 metres, then placed ninth in the US Olympic Trials 3000m steeplechase with another personal best of 9:22.77.

In January 2025, she became the fourth collegiate woman (and just second American) to break the 15-minute barrier for the 5000 metres running in Boston, Massachusetts. Her 14:57.63 was the NCAA No. 5 all-time performance and placed her as the No. 4 all-time performer, as Parker Valby ran two of the times on the Top 5 all-time list.

Competing for Brigham Young University she was the top American at the 2025 NCAA Division I Indoor Track and Field Championships in both the 3000 metres and the 5000 metres, where she raced to 2nd in the 5000 and 3rd in the 3000. She took more than 4 seconds off her best with a 9:18.05 for the 3000 metres steeplechase, a time that moved her to No. 5 in collegiate history at the Payton Jordan Invitational in Palo Alto in April 2025. That month, Halladay-Lowry ran 14:52.93 seconds to finish second in the women's 50000 metres invitational race at the Bryan Clay Invitational, moving her to No. 3 all-time on the collegiate outdoor list. She set a meet record to win the 5000 metres at the Big 12 Conference finals in May 2025. She ran a personal best 9.08.68 to finish runner-up in the 3000 metres steeplechase at the 2025 NCAA Outdoor Championships.

She had a top-ten finish at the 2025 Prefontaine Classic on 5 July. She reached the final of the 3000 metres steeplechase at the 2025 USA Outdoor Track and Field Championships, winning the final in 9:09.14 ahead of Angelina Napoleon and Kaylee Mitchell. She was selected for the American team for the 2025 World Athletics Championships in Tokyo, Japan, where she ran 9:15.06 to qualify for the final of the 3000 metres steeplechase, placing fourteenth overall.

On 1 February 2026, she placed fourth in the 3000 metres indoors with a personal best 8:38.78 at the Millrose Games. Halladay placed fourth in the 3000 metres at the 2026 USA Indoor Track and Field Championships in New York. On 25 July, she retained her national title at the 2026 USA Outdoor Track and Field Championships in New York, winning ahead of Gabbi Jennings. She set a new personal best in the Diamond League at the 2026 Athletissima in Lausanne, Switzerland on 21 August 2026, keeping with the lead pack until the final stages and held on to finish fifth in 9:08.35. It was her best finish in a Diamond League and moved her to seventh on the American all-time list. At the 2026 Diamond League Final in Brussels on 4 September, she ran a new personal best of 9:05.36 for a sixth place finish, the time moving her up to fourth on the all-time US list.

== Personal life ==
Halladay-Lowry is a member of the Church of Jesus Christ of Latter-day Saints.
