= Rose Davies (athlete) =

Australian long-distance runner

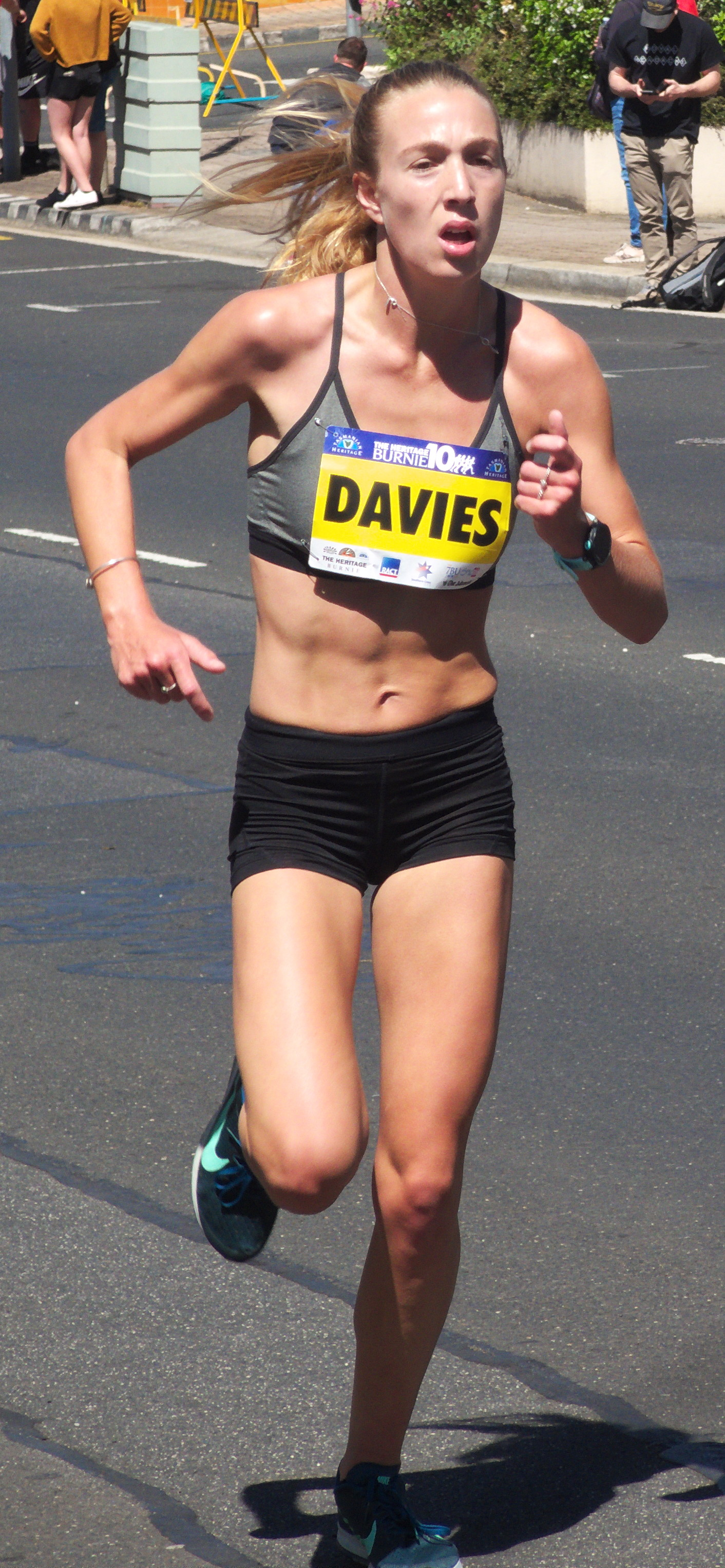
- Davies in 2018

Personal information
- Born: 21 December 1999 (age 26) New Lambton Heights, New South Wales, Australia
- Height: 1.71 m (5 ft 7 in)

Sport
- Country: Australia
- Sport: Athletics
- Event: 5000 metres

Achievements and titles
- Personal bests: 1500 m: 4:06.33 (2024); 3000 m: 8:25.38 (2026); 5000 m: 14:31.45 AR (2025); 10000 m: 30:34.11 AR (2025)
Medal record
Women's athletics
Representing Australia
Commonwealth Games
Gold medal – first place	2026 Glasgow	5,000 metres
Gold medal – first place	2026 Glasgow	10,000 metres
World Road Running Championships
Bronze medal – third place	2026 Copenhagen	5K
Silver medal – second place	2026 Copenhagen	5K mixed team

Rose Davies (born 21 December 1999 in Newcastle, New South Wales), is an Australian athlete. She holds the Australian National Record in the 5000m in a time of 14:40.83 achieved in Xiamen in 2025.

== Early years ==
Davies was born in New Lambton Heights, a suburb of Newcastle in New South Wales, Australia. She was 12-years-old when she first started running. At 14, she was the best in the nation, clocking times of 2:08 (800m) and 4:27 (1500m). She tried hard to improve on these times but it took five years to do so. In 2016 she remembers watching the Rio 2016 Olympics never thinking that she could ever qualify for an Olympics.

Davies then got Scott Westcott as her coach. His approach was critical as he allowed her to run as she wished, sometimes missing sessions or only running part of the program. Slowly she became committed and in 2018 she started to emerge off track and was placed third at the national U20 cross country. She then ran 10 km of 34:34 at Burnie, Tasmania in October 2018.

== Achievements ==
In 2018 Davies won the Lisa Ondieki U20 3000m and at the age of 19 clocked 4:19 (1500m) and 15:45 (5000m). She then came second in the national cross country and third at Zatopek with 33:25.52. (Zatopek is named after Emil Zatopek, the Czech long-distance runner, it is the most prestigious track race in Australia). Davies ran an outstanding 32:02 road 10 km in Launceston, Tasmania in December 2020.

In 2021 she won Zatopek in clocking 31:39.97. In May, 2021 she achieved her first Olympic qualifier of 15:08.48 over 5000m in Holland.

She competed in the women's 5000 metres event at the 2020 Summer Olympics. Davies came 18th in her heat with a time of 15:50.07 and was eliminated from the competition.

Davies has been Australian national champion over the 3,000m (2022) and the 5,000m and the 10,000m (both in 2024). She represented Australia at the 2024 Summer Olympics in Paris in the 5,000m, making the final in which she finished 12th. She is the current Oceania Record holder over the 5,000m and 10,000m (as of 20 July 2025).

At the 2026 Commonwealth Games she became the first woman to win both the 5,000m race and the 10,000m race at any Commonwealth Games.
