= Mathew Kipsang =

Kenyan athlete (born 1995)

Personal information
- Full name: Mathew Kipchumba Kipsang
- Nationality: Kenyan
- Born: 16 November 1995 (age 31)

Sport
- Sport: Athletics
- Event: 1500 metres – 5000 metres

Achievements and titles
- Personal bests: 1500m: 3:35.87 (Andujar, 2024); 3000m: 7:27.58 (Shanghai, 2026); 5000m: 12:58.61 (Oordegem, 2025)
Medal record
Men's athletics
Representing Kenya
Commonwealth Games
Gold medal – first place	2026 Glasgow	5000 m
World Road Running Championships
Bronze medal – third place	2026 Copenhagen	5k mixed team

Mathew Kipchumba Kipsang (born 16 November 1995) is a Kenyan long-distance and cross country runner. He won the gold medal in the 5000 metres at the 2026 Commonwealth Games.

== Biography ==
He won over 1500 metres at the Meeting Jaén Paraiso Interior in May 2024 in Andujar, Spain. He was active on the 2024–25 World Athletics Cross Country Tour finishing third in the Gold event in Atapuerca, Spain in October 2024. In November 2024, he placed third at the Cinque Mulini, part of the World Athletics Cross Country Tour Gold series in Italy. The following week, he placed fourth in the Gold series at the Cross Internacional de la Constitucion.

He finished runner-up over 1500 metres to Abel Kipsang at the Kip Keino Classic in May 2025 in a time of 3:35.87. The following month, he won the 1500 metres at the Kenya Defecnce Forces Track and Field Championships. He finished second to Cornelius Kemboi over 5000 metres at the Kenyan world championships trials in July 2025.

In September 2025, he was a finalist over 5000 metres at the 2025 World Championships in Tokyo, Japan, placing eleventh overall.

On 8 November, he won the men's 9.6 km race at the Cardiff Cross Challenge in Wales, a gold race part of the World Athletics Cross Country Tour, finishing ahead of compatriots Victor Kimosop and Stephen Kimutai. The following week, he won the Cross Internacional de Soria, and then also won the Cross de Atapuerca in Spain on 23 November. Following those victories, he won the overall 2025-26 World Athletics Cross Country Tour title.

In May 2026, he placed sixth over 3000 m in a personal best 7:27.58 at the 2026 Shanghai Diamond League. The following month, he won the 5000 m title at the Kenyan Championships in 13:45.37. On 14 July, he won the 3000 m at the István Gyulai Memorial, in Budapest. On 1 August he won the gold medal in the 5000 metres at the 2026 Commonwealth Games in Glasgow, Scotland. He was selected to represent Kenya in the 5k at the World Athletics Road Running Championships on 19 September 2026 in Copenhagen, winning the bronze medal in the mixed team event alongside Caroline Gitonga, Caroline Nyaga and Charles Kiboino. In November, Kipsang won the Cross Internacional de Soria.

== Personal life ==
He is a member of the Kenya Defence Forces (KDF).
