= Gideon Rono =

Kenyan long-distance runner (born 2003)

Personal information
- Full name: Gideon Kipkertich Rono
- Born: 22 February 2003 (age 23)

Sport
- Sport: Athletics
- Events: Long distance running, Cross country running
Medal record
Men's athletics
Representing Kenya
World Road Running Championships
Gold medal – first place	2026 Copenhagen	Half marathon team

Gideon Kipkertich Rono (born 22 February 2003) is a Kenyan long-distance and cross country runner.

== Biography ==
In January 2023, at the age of 19 years-old, Rono won the Cinque Mulini race in San Vittore Olona, Italy, a World Athletics Cross Country Tour Gold meeting. Rono placed eighth overall at the 2024 World Athletics Cross Country Championships in Belgrade.

In February 2026, Rono placed third at the Ras Al Khaimah Half Marathon, a World Athletics Gold Label road race, running a personal best time of 58:38. Rono won a gold medal in the team half marathon competition at the 2026 World Athletics Road Running Championships in Copenhagen on 20 September 2026, placing fifth overall in the individual race.
