= Gracie Hyde =

American middle-distance runner

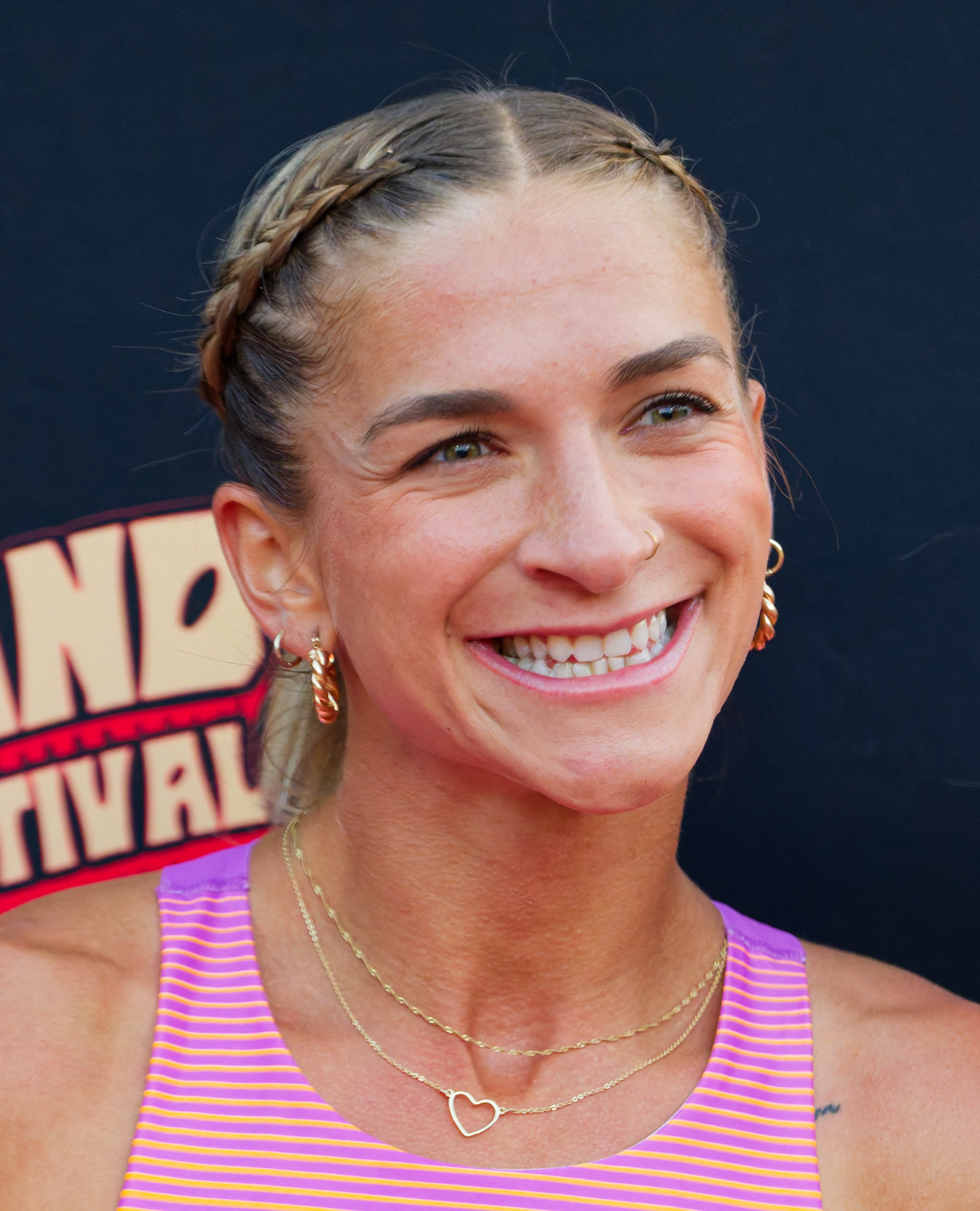
- Hyde in June 2025

Personal information
- Born: 12 December 1999 (age 26)

Sport
- Sport: Athletics
- Events: Middle-distance running, Cross country running, Steeplechase

Achievements and titles
- Personal bests: 1500m: 4:06.12 (2024); Mile 4:30.90 (2024); 5000m: 15:43.34 (2024); 3000m S'chase: 9:16.61 (2026); Indoor; 800m: 2:13.50 (2023); 1500m: 4:17.87 (2025); Mile: 4:36.97 (2025); 3000m: 8:46.24 (2026); 5000m: 16:21.47 (2021); Road; Mile: 4:25.64 (2026); 5k: 15:04 (2026)
Medal record
Women's athletics
Representing United States
World Road Running Championships
Gold medal – first place	2026 Copenhagen	Mile mixed team

Gracie Hyde (born 12 December 1999) is an American middle-distance runner and steeplechaser.

== Biography ==
From Jonesboro, Arkansas, Hyde attended Brookland High School and Benton High School, winning a total of 10 state high school championships in the middle-distances.

Hyde competed in NCAA Division 1 at the University of Arkansas. Later a graduate student at Adams State University, in February 2024, she recorded a 3000 meters indoors best to set a new NCAA DII record of 8:58.33, and set a new NCAA DII record in the mile run with 4:30.90. In March 2024, she won at the NCAA DII Championships, first by anchoring the distance medley relay team to a first-place finish, and then by winning in the mile run and the 3000 m. In April 2024, she set a new NCAA DII record in the 3000 metres steeplechase with a time of 9:28.17 in finishing runner-up to Lexy Halladay-Lowry at the Bryan Clay Invitational, surpassing the previous best set by Eilish Flanagan. That June, she became the NCAA Division II champion in the steeplechase and 1500 metres and competed at the 2024 US Olympic Team Trials, where she was a semi-finalist in the 1500 m and missed the final in the steeplechase as a time qualifier by a fraction of a second.

In December 2025, Hyde placed fourth in the 2k run at the 2025 USA Cross Country Championships. In 2026, Hyde was runner-up to Addy Wiley in the USATF 1 Mile Championships, and in May, placed third at the 2026 USATF 5 km Championships in Indianapolis. She was subsequently selected in the USA team for the World Road Running Championships in Copenhagen, Denmark, for her international debut. She set a new personal best of 9:16.61 in placing second in the 3000 m steeplechase at the Paavo Nurmi Games in Finland on 3 June. On 7 June, she had top-ten finish at the 2026 Diamond League event in Stockholm. Competing in the mile run at the World Athletics Road Running Championships on 19 September 2026, Hyde finished tenth 4:31.02, winning the mixed team gold medal for the United States.
