= Vincent Ciattei =

American runner

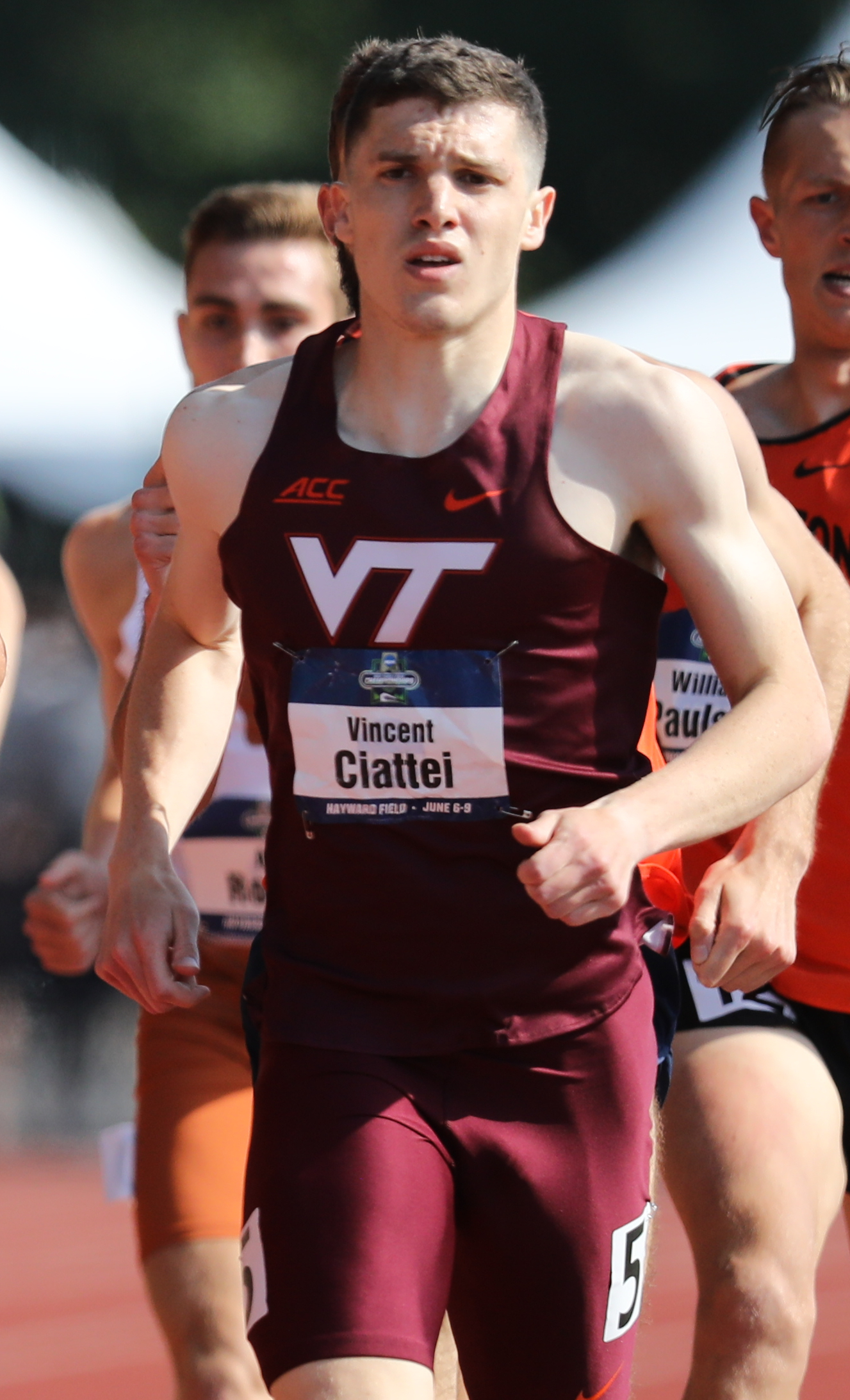
- Ciattei at the 2018 NCAA Division I Outdoor Track and Field Championships

Personal information
- Born: January 21, 1995 (age 31)
- Home town: Baltimore
- Education: Perry Hall High School

Sport
- Sport: Athletics
- Events: 1500 metres, Mile
- College team: Virginia Tech Hokies
- Club: UA Mission Run Dark Sky
- Turned pro: 2018

Achievements and titles
- Highest world ranking: 9 (1500m)
Medal record
World Road Running Championships
Gold medal – first place	2026 Copenhagen	Mile mixed team

Vincent Ciattei (born January 21, 1995) is an American middle-distance runner who competes for Under Armour's club Mission Run Dark Sky.

His personal best time in the indoor mile of 3:50.94 is the 17th fastest all-time and the 7th fastest all-time US time, which he set by winning the 2024 Trials of Miles meet at the Armory Track & Field Center. He competed collegiately for Virginia Tech, where he finished second in both the mile at the 2018 NCAA Division I Indoor Track and Field Championships and in the 1500 meters at the 2018 Outdoor Championships. He was also part of the winning team in the Distance medley relay at the 2018 Indoor Championships.

In April 2022, he won the USA 1 Mile Road Championships in Des Moines, Iowa. He also won the 2021 and 2022 editions of the Fleet Feet Liberty Mile.

Ciattei finished fourth in the 1500 meters at the 2024 US Olympic trials, running a personal best of 3:31.78, which was under the previous meet record.

== Personal bests ==
- 800 meters – 1:46.82 (Mission Viejo, CA 2021)
- 1000 meters – 2:18.49 (Finn Rock, OR 2020)
  - Indoor – 2:21.63 (Blacksburg 2017)
- 1500 meters – 3:30.90 (Rabat 2026)
  - Indoor –3:33.74 (Winston Salem, NC 2026)
- Mile – 3:48.34 (Eugene, OR 2026)
  - Indoor – 3:50.56 (New York 2024)
- 3000 meters – 7:43.52 (Leuven 2026)
  - Indoor –7:39.50 (Boston, MA 2026)
- 5000 meters – 13:13.20 (Palo Alto, CA 2026)
