= Annemarie Nissen =

Danish long-distance runner (born 1994)

Personal information
- Born: 8 July 1994 (age 32)

Sport
- Sport: Athletics
- Events: Middle-distance running, Long-distance running, Cross country running

Annemarie Nissen (born 8 July 1994) is a Danish middle-distance and cross country runner. She is a multiple-time national champion.

== Biography ==
Nissen competed at the 2022 European Athletics Championships over 400 metres hurdles before later transitioning to middle-distance. In September 2023, she set a new Danish national record for the 800 metres in Hungary with a time of 2:00:58. Competing in cross country, Nissan represented Denmark in the mixed relay team at the 2022 European Cross Country Championships in Turin.

The following year, she competed in the heats of the 800 meters at the 2023 European Athletics Indoor Championships in Istanbul. Competinf outdoors, she set a new Danish national record again for the 800 metres with 2:00.01 in Tampere, Finland and represented Denmark at the 2023 World Athletics Championships in Budapest.

In January 2025, Nissen had a perfect start to the year when she broke the Danish indoor record for 800 metres in her first event of the season with a time of 2:02.15. In March, she competed in the heats in the 800 meters at the 2025 European Athletics Indoor Championships in Apeldoorn, Netherlands. Nissen represented Denmark in the mixed relay team at the 2025 European Cross Country Championships in Lagoa, Portugal.

In August 2026, she competed at the 2026 European Athletics Championships in Birmingham, England, in the 1500 metres. Competing in the mile run at the World Athletics Road Running Championships in Copenhagen on 19 September 2026, she placed fourth overall in a Danish national record of 4:26.78.

== Personal life ==
From Als, she as later based in Østerbro. From 2019, Nissen worked as a prosecutor for the South Zealand and Lolland-Falster Police in Næstved, later working for the Danish Ministry of Justice. She has been mentored in athletics by Trevor Painter and M11 Track Club in England.
