= Veronica Loleo =

Kenyan long-distance runner

Personal information
- Born: 18 March 1998 (age 28)

Sport
- Country: Kenya
- Sport: Long-distance running
- Event: Half marathon

Achievements and titles
- Personal bests: 10,000 m: 31:02.43 (Nerja 2024); Road; 10 km: 30:53 (Herzogenaurach 2023); 15 km: 49:37 (Utica 2025); Half marathon: 1:05:35 (Berlin 2026)
Medal record
Women's athletics
Representing Kenya
World Road Running Championships
Disqualified	2026 Copenhagen	Half marathon
Disqualified	2026 Copenhagen	Half marathon team

Veronica Loleo (born 18 March 1998) is a Kenyan long-distance runner.

== Career ==
In 2022 she won silver in the Hamburg Half Marathon. The following year she got bronze at the Zwolle Half Marathon and silver at the Málaga Half Marathon.

In 2025 she first won silver in the Prague Half Marathon and then won the 12 km race at the Lilac Bloomsday Run, the 15 km at the Boilermaker Road Race, and Buenos Aires Half Marathon. She also placed 3rd in the Valencia Half Marathon behind Agnes Ngetich and Fotyen Tesfay.

In 2026, Loleo placed 3rd in the Berlin Half Marathon and 3rd in the B.A.A. 10K. She then attended the 2026 World Athletics Road Running Championships in Copenhagen and was part of the Kenyan women's team which won the women's half marathon team event and she also captured silver in the individual women's half marathon event behind Agnes Jebet Ngetich.

On 19 November 2026, Loleo received a three-year ban from the sport after testing positive for the banned substance EPO. Her results from the 2026 World Athletics Road Running Championships were annulled.
