= Kip Keino Classic =

Track and field meeting

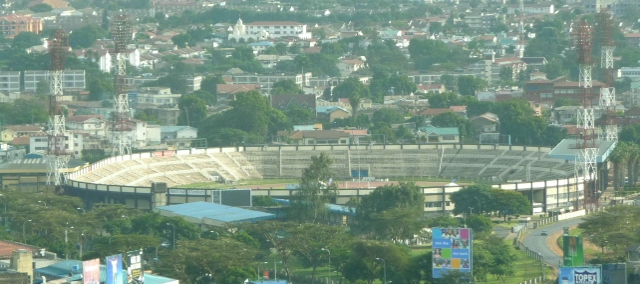
- The host stadium in Nairobi
- Date: October
- Location: Nairobi, Kenya
- Event type: Track and field
- Established: 2020
- Website: kipkeinoclassic.co.ke

The Kip Keino Classic is a track and field meeting held at the Kasarani Stadium in Nairobi, Kenya and named after Olympian Kipchoge Keino. The inaugural edition took place in 2020 as part of the inaugural World Athletics Continental Tour.

The venue is at 1,612 metres in elevation, slightly over 1 mile in altitude, thus all marks set here are considered at altitude which is an advantage to short, explosive events like sprinting and jumping due to less air resistance but a dis-advantage to long distance runners due to the availability of less oxygen.

== Meet records ==
=== Men ===
Event	Record	Athlete	Nationality	Date	Ref.
100 m	9.76 A (+1.2 m/s)	Trayvon Bromell	United States	18 September 2021	
200 m	19.71 A (−1.5 m/s)	Courtney Lindsey	United States	20 April 2024	
200 m	19.71 A (−1.5 m/s)	Letsile Tebogo	Botswana	20 April 2024	
400 m	43.76 A	Zakithi Nene	South Africa	31 May 2025	
800 m	1:43.32 A	Emmanuel Wanyonyi	Kenya	13 May 2023	
800 m	1:43.32 A	Jonah Koech	United States	31 May 2025	
1500 m	3:31.01 A	Abel Kipsang	Kenya	7 May 2022	
3000 m	7:45.56 A	Emmanuel Kiprono	Kenya	24 April 2026	
5000 m	13:08.32 A	Nicholas Kimeli	Kenya	3 October 2020	
10,000 m	28:06.90 A	Paul Tanui	Kenya	3 October 2020	
400 m hurdles	48.34 A	Wiseman Were Mukhobe	Kenya	31 May 2025	
3000 m steeplechase	8:14.55 A	Gemechu Godana	Ethiopia	24 April 2026	
High jump	2.20 m A	Mathew Sawe	Kenya	3 October 2020	
Pole vault	5.65 m A	Rutger Koppelaar	Netherlands	18 September 2021	
Triple jump	15.95 m A (+1.7 m/s)	Isaac Kirwa	Kenya	20 April 2024	
Shot put	16.66 m A	George Malala	Kenya	31 May 2025	
Hammer throw	84.38 m A	Ethan Katzberg	Canada	20 April 2024	
Javelin throw	89.28 m A	Rumesh Tharanga Pathirage	Sri Lanka	24 April 2026	
20 km walk (road)	1:22:56 A	Samuel Gathimba	Kenya	3 October 2020	

=== Women ===
Event	Record	Athlete	Nationality	Date	Ref.
100 m	10.67 A (−0.4 m/s)	Shelly-Ann Fraser-Pryce	Jamaica	7 May 2022	
200 m	21.89 A (+1.7 m/s)	Gabby Thomas	United States	24 April 2026	
400 m	50.14 A	Mercy Oketch	Kenya	31 May 2025	
800 m	1:57.96 A	Mary Moraa	Kenya	20 April 2024	
1500 m	4:01.50 A	Diribe Welteji	Ethiopia	7 May 2022	
3000 m	9:08.98 A	Venenza Chebet Masai	Kenya	24 April 2026	
5000 m	14:49.97 A	Girmawit Gebrzihair	Ethiopia	7 May 2022	
400 m hurdles	54.12 A	Amalie Iuel	Norway	24 April 2026	
3000 m steeplechase	9:04.95 A	Norah Jeruto	Kazakhstan	7 May 2022	
High jump	2.00 m A	Yaroslava Mahuchikh	Ukraine	13 May 2023	
Long jump	6.84 m A (+0.6 m/s)	Lissandra Campos	Brazil	31 May 2025	
Hammer throw	80.03 m A	Camryn Rogers	Canada	24 April 2026	
20 km walk (road)	1:46:40 A	Grace Wanjiru	Kenya	3 October 2020	
