= James Kingston (runner) =

British runner (born 2002)

- Kingston in 2026

Personal information
- Nationality: British (English)
- Born: 22 January 2002 (age 24)

Sport
- Sport: Athletics
- Events: Long-distance running, cross country running

Achievements and titles
- Personal bests: 5000m: 13:41.91 (Brussels, 2025)
Medal record
Men's athletics
Representing Great Britain
European Cross Country Championships
Gold medal – first place	2023 Antalya	U23 team

James Kingston (born 22 January 2002) is a British cross country runner. He won the 2023 English National Cross Country Championships and represented Great Britain at the 2024 World Athletics Cross Country Championships.

== Biography ==
From Kent, and a member of Tonbridge AC, he won the senior men's title in the Kent County Cross-Country Championships at Brands Hatch in January 2023. He won his first South of England cross country title later that month. The following month, he won the English National Cross Country Championships, the first Tonbridge athlete ever to do so.

Kingston won the South of England cross country championships again in Beckenham in January 2024. He represented Great Britain at the 2024 World Athletics Cross Country Championships in Belgrade, Serbia in March 2024.

Kingston placed 16th overall in the men's U23 race as the Great Britain team won the gold medal at the 2024 European Cross Country Championships in Antalya, Turkey. In January 2025, he placed second representing England at the Home Countries International. He was runner-up to Logan Rees at the Leeds Cross Challenge the following month. He ran a personal best for the 5000 metres of 13:41.91 in May 2025 in Belgium, and ran a 64:35 half-marathon at the Great North Run. In October 2025, Kingston placed second in the individual race and won the team event representing England in Roeselare in the Belgium Cross Cup.

Kingston won the Kent cross country championships for the fourth consecutive year and also won the South of England cross country championships in Beckenham, in January 2026. He placed third in the men's senior race at the London Cross Challenge at Parliament Hill on 7 February 2026. He was runner-up to Hugo Milner at the 2026 English National Cross Country Championships in Sedgefield. On 7 March, he won the title at the UK Athletics Cross Challenge Final and UK Inter Counties Championships in Nottingham ahead of Jacob Cann. Kingston placed second in the British national 10,000 metres championship race in Loughborough on 17 May 2026, behind Joe Wigfield. On 8 November, Kingston was runner-up to Matt Ramsden at the Cardiff Cross Challenge, a silver label race on the World Athletics Cross Country Tour.
