= Magnus Øyen =

Norewgian athlete (born 2007)

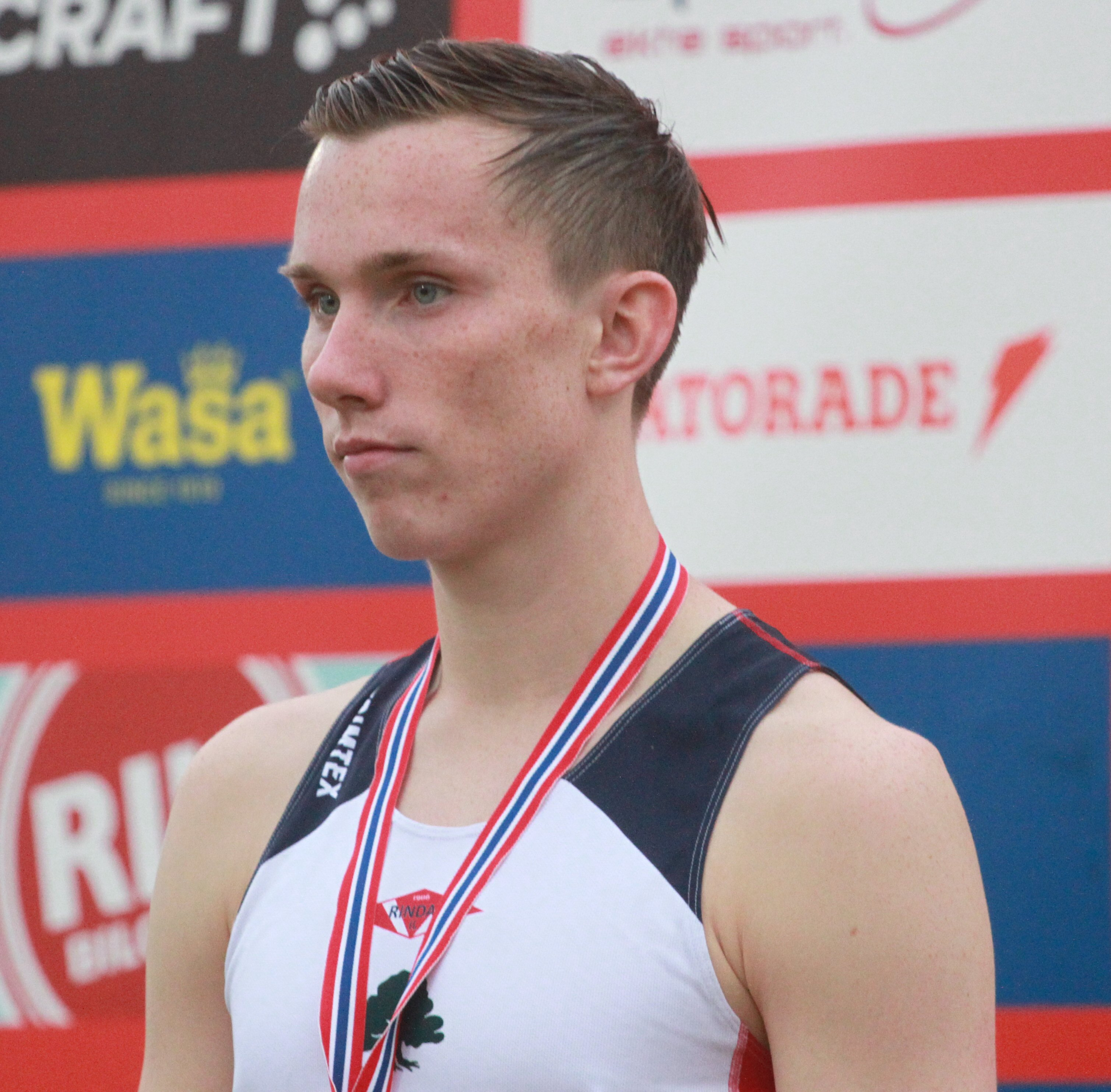
- Øyen in 2026

Personal information
- Born: 26 April 2007 (age 19)

Sport
- Sport: Athletics
- Events: Middle-distance running, Long-distance running, Cross Country running

Achievements and titles
- Personal bests: 1500m: 3:41.29 (Trondheim, 2025); 3000m: 7:55.54 (Trondheim, 2025); 5000m: 13:54.56 (Oslo, 2025)
Medal record
Men's athletics
Representing NOR
European U20 Championships
| Bronze medal – third place | 2025 Tampere | 5000 m |
European Youth Olympic Festival
| Silver medal – second place | 2023 Maribor | 3000m |
European Cross Country Championships
| Gold medal – first place | 2024 Antalya | U20 Team |

Magnus Øyen (born 26 April 2007) is a Norwegian middle-, long-distance and cross country runner.

== Biography ==
A member of Rindal IL Athletics, Øyen was selected to run the 3000 metres at the 2023 European Summer Youth Olympic Festival in Maribor, Slovenia, winning the silver medal behind Aldin Catovic of Serbia.

In June 2024, Øyen, was the youngest man in the field as he ran to seventh place in a time of 3.49.09 in the 1500 metres at the Norwegian Athletics Championships. In August 2024, he was runner-up to Håkon Moe Berg at the Norwegian under-20 championships over 1500 metres. He also had a top-ten finish in the 5000 metres at the championships, breaking the 14 minute-barrier for the first time with a time of 13:59.40. In August, he lowered his personal best for the 1500 metres to 3:43.60.

Øyen placed fourth in the under-20 race at the 2024 European Cross Country Championships in Antalya, Turkey, winning the gold medal in the team event alongside Andreas Fjeld Halvorsen and Kristian Bråthen. In April 2025, Øyen competed in the senior men's race at the Norwegian National Cross Country Championships over 3 km, held in Bjerkebanen, Oslo, where he ran here to third place overall.

Øyen won the bronze medal over 5000 metres at the 2025 European Athletics U20 Championships in Tampere, Finland, finishing behind Willem Renders of Belgium and Sweden's Karl Ottfalk in August 2025. He was selected to represent Norway at the 2025 European Cross Country Championships in Lagoa, Portugal, placing fifth overall in the men’s under-20 race.

In August 2026, he placed sixth overall in the 5000 metres race at the 2026 World Athletics U20 Championships in Eugene, United States.
