= 2025 European Cross Country Championships =

- Organisers: EAA
- Edition: 31st
- Date: 14 December
- Host city: Lagoa, (Portugal)
- Venue: Lagoa, Portugal
- Events: 7
- Distances: ~7.5 km – Men; ~7.5 km – Women; ~6 km – U23 men ~6 km – U23 women ~4.5 km – U20 men ~4.5 km – U20 women ~4 x 1.5 km – Mixed relay
- Official website: Lagoa 2025

The 2025 European Cross Country Championships was the 31st edition of the cross country running competition for European athletes. It was held on 14 December 2025 in Lagoa, Portugal. The competition consisted of seven races and thirteen medal events; each of the six individual events (junior, under-23 and senior races for both men and women) also included a team classification based on aggregate finishing positions, while a thirteenth event, a mixed relay, was also held.

== Medal table ==
* Host nation (Portugal)

Rank	Nation	Gold	Silver	Bronze	Total
1	Spain (ESP)	3	2	3	8
2	Belgium (BEL)	3	0	0	3
3	Great Britain (GBR)	2	3	1	6
4	Ireland (IRL)	2	1	1	4
5	Italy (ITA)	2	0	0	2
6	France (FRA)	1	4	4	9
7	Germany (GER)	0	1	1	2
8	Finland (FIN)	0	1	0	1
8	Portugal (POR)*	0	1	0	1
10	Sweden (SWE)	0	0	1	1
10	Switzerland (SUI)	0	0	1	1
10	Turkey (TUR)	0	0	1	1
Totals (12 entries)		13	13	13	39

== Medal summary ==
Event	Gold		Silver		Bronze	
Individual
Senior men	Thierry Ndikumwenayo; Spain	22:05	Jimmy Gressier; France	22:08	Dominic Lobalu; Switzerland	22:23
Senior women	Nadia Battocletti; Italy	24:52	Megan Keith; Great Britain	25:07	Yasemin Can; Turkey	25:13
U23 men	Nick Griggs; Ireland	17:47	Aurélien Radja; France	17:59	Pierre Boudy; France	18:03
U23 women	Maria Forero; Spain	19:59	Ilona Mononen; Finland	20:04	Pia Schlattmann; Germany	20:23
U20 men	Willem Renders; Belgium	13:11	Oscar Gaitan; Spain	13:12	Alois Abraham; France	13:19
U20 women	Innes Fitzgerald; Great Britain	14:35	Lucie Paturel; France	15:07	Emma Hickey; Ireland	15:10
Team
Senior men	Spain; Thierry Ndikumwenayo; Abdessamad Oukhelfen; Aarón las Heras; Ilias Fifa; Said Mechaal; Daniel Arce	16	Ireland; Jack O'Leary; Brian Fay; Cormac Dalton; Darragh McElhinney; Efrem Gidey	26	France; Jimmy Gressier; Fabien Palcau; Simon Bedard; Luc le Baron; Valentin Bresc; Hugo Hay	37
Senior women	Belgium; Jana Van Lent; Lisa Rooms; Chloé Herbiet; Victoria Warpy	16	Great Britain; Megan Keith; Phoebe Anderson; Verity Ockenden; Poppy Tank; Cari Hughes; Izzy Fry	39	France; Agathe Guillemot; Anaëlle Guillonnet; Alessia Zarbo; Marie Bouchard; Célia Tabet	42
U23 men	Ireland; Nick Griggs; Callum Morgan; Niall Murphy; Jonas Stafford; Lughaidh Mallon	19	France; Aurélien Radja; Pierre Boudy; Anas Chaoudar; Oscar Thebaud; Ishak Dahmani	33	Spain; Jaime Migallón; Ciro Martín; Martín Segurola; Rubén Leonardo; Mesfin Escamilla; Aleix Vives	42
U23 women	France; Julia David-Smith; Camille Place; Nélie Clément; Lola Darcy; Jade Le Corre	21	Germany; Pia Schlattmann; Lisa Merkel; Kira Weis; Nele Heymann	21	Spain; Maria Forero; Marta Serrano; Mireya Arnedillo; Jimena Blanco; Rocio Garrido	25
U20 men	Belgium; Willem Renders; Sem Serrano; Ilyes Druez; Elliot Vermeulen	14	Great Britain; William Sean Rabjohns; Alex Lennon; Michael Clark; Quinn Miell-Ingram; Jonson Hughes; Luke Dunham	45	Spain; Oscar Gaitan; Alejandro Ibañez; Ander Aramendi; Andres Lara; Mario Palencia; Guillermo Sanchez	46
U20 women	Great Britain; Innes Fitzgerald; Beth Lewis; Isabel Holt; Eliza Nicholson; Zara Redmond; Lizzie Wellsted	33	Spain; María Viciosa; Mara Rolli; Claudia Gutierrez; Sandra Gonzalez; Andrea Buenavida; Ines Herault	38	Sweden; Carmen Cernjul; Fanny Szalkai; Anastasia Nilsson; Freja Bjerström; Hanna Strand; Majken Söderlund Larsson	44
mixed relay
Mixed relay	Italy; Gaia Sabbatini; Sebastiano Parolini; Marta Zenoni; Pietro Arese	17:12	Portugal; Patricia Silva; Rodrigo Lima; Salomé Afonso; Isaac Nader	17:16	Great Britain; Ava Lloyd; Jack Higgins; Holly Dixon; Callum Elson	17:17

- Note: Athletes in italics did not score for the team result.

== Results ==
=== Senior men ===
Individual race
Rank	Athlete	Country	Time (m:s)
1st place, gold medalist(s)	Thierry Ndikumwenayo	Spain	22:05
2nd place, silver medalist(s)	Jimmy Gressier	France	22:08
3rd place, bronze medalist(s)	Dominic Lokinyomo Lobalu	Switzerland	22:23
4	Scott Beattie	Great Britain	22:23
5	Jack O'Leary	Ireland	22:25
6	Abdessamad Oukhelfen	Spain	22:27
7	Ruben Querinjean	Luxembourg	22:28
8	Simon Sundström	Sweden	22:29
9	Aarón Las Heras	Spain	22:30
10	Brian Fay	Ireland	22:31
11	Cormac Dalton	Ireland	22:31
12	Ilias Fifa	Spain	22:38
13	John Heymans	Belgium	22:41
14	Etson Barros	Portugal	22:44
15	Fabien Palcau	France	22:45
16	Darragh McElhinney	Ireland	22:49
17	Rory Leonard	United Kingdom	22:49
18	Ibrahim Buras	Norway	22:51
19	Efrem Gidey	Ireland	22:52
20	Simon Bedard	France	22:54
21	Miguel Moreira	Portugal	22:58
22	Magnus Tuv Myhre	Norway	22:59
23	Adisu Guadia	Israel	23:01
24	Oliver Löfqvist	Sweden	23:02
25	Giovanni Gatto	Italy	23:04
26	Jonas Raess	Switzerland	23:06
27	Luc Le Baron	France	23:07
28	Andrii Atamaniuk	Ukraine	23:07
29	Jacob Cann	United Kingdom	23:08
30	Ruben Verheyden	Belgium	23:10
31	Abderrazzak Gasmi	Italy	23:10
32	Jacob Boutera	Norway	23:13
33	Rui Pinto	Portugal	23:13
34	Markus Görger	Germany	23:14
35	Joe Hudson	United Kingdom	23:16
36	Valentin Bresc	France	23:16
37	Derebe Ayele	Israel	23:23
38	Richard Slade	United Kingdom	23:25
39	Nick Jäger	Germany	23:26
40	Simas Bertašius	Lithuania	23:27
41	Calum Johnson	United Kingdom	23:29
42	Osama Zoghlami	Italy	23:33
43	Marcin Biskup	Poland	23:34
44	Luca Alfieri	Italy	23:34
45	Alexandre Figueiredo	Portugal	23:35
46	Tuomas Heikkilä	Finland	23:37
47	Saïd Mechaal	Spain	23:38
48	Peter Ďurec	Slovakia	23:39
49	Mathias Flak	Norway	23:42
50	Yassin Bouih	Italy	23:45
51	Jáchym Kovář	Czech Republic	23:46
52	Nik Lemmink	Netherlands	23:46
53	Andreas Bock Bjørnsen	Denmark	23:48
54	Daniel Arce	Spain	23:51
55	Axel Djurberg	Sweden	23:53
56	Jacob Stengaard	Denmark	23:56
57	Seyfu Jamaal Tahir	ART	23:57
58	Jesse Fokkenrood	Netherlands	24:01
59	Ossi Kekki	Finland	24:06
60	João Amaro	Portugal	24:10
61	Ayetullah Aslanhan	Turkey	24:12
62	Matan Ivri	Israel	24:13
63	Marcel Tobler	Australia	24:16
64	Luke Micallef	Malta	24:21
65	Ersin Tekal	Turkey	24:29
66	Azat Demirtaş	Turkey	24:33
67	Anders Nedergaard	Denmark	24:49
68	Elias Ariel Aarestrup Shifris	Denmark	24:49
69	Giorgos Tofi	Cyprus	24:52
70	Christoffer Frost Johansen	Denmark	24:53
71	Ivan Andreev	Bulgaria	25:04
72	Niall Foley	Luxembourg	25:18
73	Abdulhalik Çağiran	Turkey	25:38
74	Klemen Vilhar	Slovenia	25:48
75	Nikita Bogdanovs	Latvia	26:02
76	Richard Blagg	Gibraltar	27:29
77	Philip Macedo	Gibraltar	LAP
78	Benjamin James Reeves	Gibraltar	LAP
79	Andrew Lee Jeffries-Mor	Gibraltar	LAP
80	Colin Mark Thompson	Gibraltar	LAP
81	Maurice Turnock	Gibraltar	LAP
82	Ilir Këllezi	Albania	LAP
	Jan Kokalj	Slovenia	DNF
	José Carlos Pinto	Portugal	DNF
	Yohanes Chiappinelli	Italy	DNF
	Hugo Hay	France	DNF
	Mustafe Muuse	Finland	DNF
	Guillaume Grimard	Belgium	DNF

2025 European Cross Country Championships - Men's 7.5 km results

Team race
Rank	Team	Points
1st place, gold medalist(s)	Spain; Thierry Ndikumwenayo; Abdessamad Oukhelfen; Aarón Las Heras; Ilias Fifa; Said Mechaal; Daniel Arce	16 (1+6+9)
2nd place, silver medalist(s)	Ireland; Jack O'Leary; Brian Fay; Cormac Dalton; Darragh McElhinney; Efrem Gidey	26 (5+10+11)
3rd place, bronze medalist(s)	France; Jimmy Gressier; Fabien Palcau; Simon Bedard; Luc Le Baron; Valentin Bresc; Hugo Hay	37 (2+15+20)
4	Great Britain; Scott Beattie; Rory Leonard; Jacob Cann; Joe Hudson; Richard Slade; Calum Johnson	50 (4+17+29)
5	Portugal; Etson Barros; Miguel Moreira; Rui Pinto; Alexandre Figueiredo; João Amaro; José Carlos Pinto	68 (14+21+33)
6	Norway; Ibrahim Buras; Magnus Tuv Myhre; Jacob Boutera; Mathias Flak	72 (18+22+32)
7	Sweden; Simon Sundström; Oliver Löfqvist; Axel Djurberg	87 (8+24+55)
8	Italy; Giovanni Gatto; Abderrazzak Gasmi; Osama Zoghlami; Luca Alfieri; Yassin Bouih; Yohanes Chiappinelli	98 (25+31+42)
9	Israel; Adisu Guadia; Derebe Ayele; Matan Ivri	122 (23+37+62)
10	Denmark; Andreas Bock Bjørnsen; Jacob Stengaard; Anders Nedergaard; Elias Ariel Aarestrup Shifris; Christoffer Frost Johansen	176 (53+56+67)
11	Turkey; Ayetullah Aslanhan; Ersin Tekal; Azat Demirtaş; Abdulhalik Çağıran	192 (61+65+66)
	Belgium; John Heymans; Ruben Verheyden; Guillaume Grimard	NM (13+30)
	Finland; Tuomas Heikkilä; Ossi Kekki; Mustafe Muuse	NM (46+59)

=== Senior women ===
Individual race
Rank	Athlete	Country	Time (m:s)
1st place, gold medalist(s)	Nadia Battocletti	Italy	24:52
2nd place, silver medalist(s)	Megan Keith	Great Britain	25:07
3rd place, bronze medalist(s)	Yasemin Can	Turkey	25:13
4	Jana Van Lent	Belgium	25:24
5	Lisa Rooms	Belgium	25:34
6	Amina Maatoug	Netherlands	25:36
7	Chloe Herbiet	Belgium	25:43
8	Elena Burkard	Germany	25:45
9	Sarah Lahti	Sweden	25:48
10	Fiona Everard	Ireland	25:54
11	Agathe Guillemot	France	25:54
12	Anaëlle Guillonnet	France	25:55
13	Ruken Tek	Turkey	25:57
14	Elisa Palmero	Italy	25:58
15	Diane van Es	Netherlands	26:00
16	Phoebe Anderson	United Kingdom	26:01
17	Idaira Prieto	Spain	26:06
18	Angela Viciosa	Spain	26:10
19	Alessia Zarbo	France	26:11
20	Selma Engdahl	Norway	26:12
21	Verity Ockenden	United Kingdom	26:13
22	Poppy Tank	United Kingdom	26:15
23	Niamh Allen	Ireland	26:15
24	Marie Bouchard	France	26:16
25	Andrea Modin Engesæth	Norway	26:18
26	Veerle Bakker	Netherlands	26:19
27	Laura Taborda	Portugal	26:20
28	Valentina Gemetto	Italy	26:21
29	Cari Hughes	United Kingdom	26:21
30	Micol Majori	Italy	26:21
31	Izzy Fry	United Kingdom	26:22
32	Victoria Warpy	Belgium	26:23
33	Carolina Robles	Spain	26:26
34	Carla Gallardo	Spain	26:36
35	Nursena Çeto	Turkey	26:41
36	Danielle Donegan	Ireland	26:42
37	Majida Maayouf	Spain	26:53
38	Joana Vanessa Carvalho	Portugal	26:56
39	Emmy Van Den Berg	Netherlands	26:58
40	Hanne Mjøen Maridal	Norway	26:58
41	Karawan Halabi Kablan	Israel	27:01
42	Célia Tabet	France	27:02
43	Devora Avramova	Bulgaria	27:05
44	Emily Haggard-Kearney	Ireland	27:06
45	Josephine Thestrup	Denmark	27:12
46	Bahar Yıldırım	Turkey	27:15
47	Tereza Hrochová	Czech Republic	27:16
48	Nicole Svetlana Reina	Italy	27:17
49	Derya Kunur	Turkey	27:21
50	Mary Mulhare	Ireland	27:25
51	Isabel Barreiro	Spain	27:25
52	Viktoriia Shkurko	Ukraine	27:28
53	Olimpia Breza	Poland	27:29
54	Federica Zanne	Italy	27:31
55	Nanna Bové	Denmark	27:32
56	Evelina Henriksson	Sweden	27:33
57	Anna Holm Baumeister	Denmark	27:34
58	Ana Mafalda Ferreira	Portugal	27:37
59	Anna Emilie Møller	Denmark	27:40
60	Romane Wolhauser	Switzerland	27:43
61	Neide Dias	Portugal	27:48
62	Ivanna Chereshnyovska	Ukraine	27:50
63	Farida Abaroge	ART	27:57
64	Vaida Žūsinaitė-Nekriošienė	Lithuania	27:59
65	Zita Urbán	Hungary	28:10
66	Melissa Chelena Anastasakis	Greece	28:22
67	Veronika Páleníková	Slovakia	28:38
68	Mónica Silva	Portugal	28:41
	Eva Dieterich	Germany	DNF
	Mariana Machado	Portugal	DNF

2025 European Cross Country Championships - Women's 7.5 km results

Team race
Rank	Team	Points
1st place, gold medalist(s)	Belgium; Jana Van Lent; Lisa Rooms; Chloé Herbiet; Victoria Warpy	16 (4+5+7)
2nd place, silver medalist(s)	Great Britain; Megan Keith; Phoebe Anderson; Verity Ockenden; Poppy Tank; Cari Hughes; Izzy Fry	39 (2+16+21)
3rd place, bronze medalist(s)	France; Agathe Guillemot; Anaëlle Guillonnet; Alessia Zarbo; Marie Bouchard; Célia Tabet	42 (11+12+19)
4	Italy; Nadia Battocletti; Elisa Palmero; Valentina Gemetto; Micol Majori; Nicole Svetlana Reina; Federica Zanne	43 (1+14+28)
5	Netherlands; Amina Maatoug; Diane Van Es; Veerle Bakker; Emmy Van Den Berg	47 (6+15+26)
6	Turkey; Yasemin Can; Ruken Tek; Nursena Çeto; Bahar Yildirim; Derya Kunur	51 (3+13+35)
7	Spain; Idaira Prieto; Angela Viciosa; Carolina Robles; Carla Gallardo; Majida Maayouf; Isabel Barreiro	68 (17+18+33)
8	Ireland; Fiona Everard; Niamh Allen; Danielle Donegan; Emily Haggard-Kearney; Mary Mulhare	69 (10+23+36)
9	Norway; Selma Engdahl; Andrea Modin Engesæth; Hanne Mjøen Maridal	85 (20+25+40)
10	Portugal; Laura Taborda; Joana Vanessa Carvalho; Ana Mafalda Ferreira; Neide Dias; Mónica Silva; Mariana Machado	123 (27+38+58)
11	Denmark; Josephine Thestrup; Nanna Bové; Anna Holm Jørgensen; Anna Emilie Møller	157 (45+55+57)

=== Men's Cross Country U23 Race ===
Individual race
Rank	Athlete	Country	Time (m:s)
1st place, gold medalist(s)	Nicholas Griggs	Ireland	17:47
2nd place, silver medalist(s)	Aurélien Radja	France	17:59
3rd place, bronze medalist(s)	Pierre Boudy	France	18:03
4	Joel Ibler Lillesø	Denmark	18:05
5	Jaime Migallon	Spain	18:06
6	Matthew Ramsden	United Kingdom	18:06
7	Stefan Nillessen	Netherlands	18:07
8	Callum Morgan	Ireland	18:12
9	Gábor Karsai	Hungary	18:13
10	Niall Murphy	Ireland	18:13
11	Nino Freitag	Switzerland	18:16
12	Robin Müller	Germany	18:16
13	Duarte Santos	Portugal	18:17
14	Will Barnicoat	United Kingdom	18:19
15	Noah Konteh	Belgium	18:20
16	Maciej Megier	Poland	18:22
17	Ciro Martín	Spain	18:23
18	Andreas Fjeld Halvorsen	Norway	18:23
19	Kurt Lauer	Germany	18:26
20	Martín Segurola	Spain	18:27
20	João Santos	Portugal	18:27
22	Rubén Leonardo	Spain	18:28
22	Jonathan Grahn	Sweden	18:28
24	Mikko Kauppinen	Finland	18:30
25	Jonathan Hofer	Switzerland	18:31
26	Konjoneh Maggi	Italy	18:32
27	Francesco Ropelato	Italy	18:33
28	Anas Lagity Chaoudar	France	18:35
29	Jonas Stafford	Ireland	18:35
30	Adam Bajorski	Poland	18:36
31	Finley Proffitt	United Kingdom	18:37
32	Mesfin Escamilla	Spain	18:38
33	Mathis Lievens	Belgium	18:39
34	Teun Ter Haar	Netherlands	18:40
35	Nathan Houwaard	Netherlands	18:40
36	Jenson Connell	United Kingdom	18:41
37	Vetle Farrbu-Solbakken	Norway	18:45
38	Nicolo Cornali	Italy	18:46
39	Oscar Thebaud	France	18:46
40	Jakob Dieterich	Germany	18:47
41	Casper Lievens	Belgium	18:48
42	Simon Jeukenne	Belgium	18:52
43	Diyar Ergüven	Turkey	18:56
44	Juan Zijderlaan	Netherlands	18:58
45	Matteo Bardea	Italy	18:59
46	Joakim Bertelsen	Denmark	19:00
47	Morten Siht	Estonia	19:03
48	Lughaidh Mallon	Ireland	19:06
49	Ishak Dahmani	France	19:08
50	Vegard Vesterhaug Warnes	Norway	19:09
51	Amorin Gerbeti	Italy	19:09
52	Sam Hodgson	United Kingdom	19:11
53	Leandro Monteiro	Portugal	19:11
54	Silas Zahlten	Germany	19:11
55	Gustav Bendsen	Denmark	19:12
56	Rodrigo Freitas	Portugal	19:15
57	Enbiya Yazici	Turkey	19:17
58	Aleksii Pysarev	Ukraine	19:19
59	Aleix Vives	Spain	19:23
60	Joel Doye	United Kingdom	19:25
61	Kuba Gajda	Poland	19:26
62	Mattia Marazzoli	Italy	19:27
63	Gabriel Farrugia	Malta	19:28
64	Stanislav Rashkov	Bulgaria	19:43
65	Kevin Kamenschak	Austria	19:47
65	Alexander Bozhilov	Bulgaria	19:47
67	Maciej Lachowski	Poland	19:49
68	Cuma Özcan	Turkey	19:55
69	Lauris Grīniņš	Latvia	19:58
70	Erik Černiaŭski	Lithuania	20:00
71	Mikas Montvilas	Lithuania	20:41
72	Tjaš Pelko	Slovenia	21:03
73	Nil Kerin	Slovenia	21:29
74	Alexandre Lucas	Portugal	22:29
	Lourenço Rodrigues	Portugal	DNF
	Ömer Faruk Bozdağ	Turkey	DNF

Team race
Rank	Team	Points
1st place, gold medalist(s)	Ireland; Nicholas Griggs; Callum Morgan; Niall Murphy; Jonas Stafford; Lughaidh Mallon	19 pts (1+8+10)
2nd place, silver medalist(s)	France; Aurélien Radja; Pierre Boudy; Anas Lagity Chaoudar; Oscar Thebaud; Ishak Dahmani	33 pts (2+3+28)
3rd place, bronze medalist(s)	Spain; Jaime Migallon; Ciro Martín; Martín Segurola; Rubén Leonardo; Mesfin Escamilla; Aleix Vives	42 pts (5+17+20)
4	United Kingdom; Matthew Ramsden; Will Barnicoat; Finley Proffitt; Jenson Connell; Sam Hodgson; Joel Doye	51 pts (6+14+31)
5	Germany; Robin Müller; Kurt Lauer; Jakob Dieterich; Silas Zahlten	71 pts (12+19+40)
6	Netherlands; Stefan Nillessen; Teun Ter Haar; Nathan Houwaard; Juan Zijderlaan	76 pts (7+34+35)
7	Portugal; Duarte Santos; João Santos; Leandro Monteiro; Rodrigo Freitas; Alexandre Lucas; Lourenço Rodrigues	86 pts (13+20+53)
8	Belgium; Noah Konteh; Mathis Lievens; Casper Lievens; Simon Jeukenne	89 pts (15+33+41)
9	Italy; Konjoneh Maggi; Francesco Ropelato; Nicolo Cornali; Matteo Bardea; Amorin Gerbeti; Mattia Marazzoli	91 pts (26+27+38)
10	Norway; Andreas Fjeld Halvorsen; Vetle Farrbu-Solbakken; Vegard Vesterhaug Warnes	105 pts (18+37+50)
11	Denmark; Joel Ibler Lillesø; Joakim Bertelsen; Gustav Bendsen	105 pts (4+46+55)
12	Poland; Maciej Megier; Adam Bajorski; Kuba Gajda; Maciej Lachowski	107 pts (16+30+61)
13	Turkey; Diyar Ergüven; Enbiya Yazici; Cuma Özcan; Ömer Faruk Bozdağ	168 pts (43+57+68)

=== Women's Cross Country U23 Race ===
Individual race
Rank	Athlete	Country	Time (m:s)
1st place, gold medalist(s)	Maria Forero	Spain	19:59
2nd place, silver medalist(s)	Ilona Mononen	Finland	20:04
3rd place, bronze medalist(s)	Pia Schlattmann	Germany	20:23
4	Lisa Merkel	Germany	20:25
5	Julia David-Smith	France	20:37
6	Marta Serrano	Spain	20:38
7	Camille Place	France	20:38
8	Lucia Arnoldo	Italy	20:54
9	Nélie Clément	France	20:55
10	Julia Rosén	Sweden	20:56
11	Kirsty Maher	Ireland	20:57
12	Greta Settino	Italy	20:59
13	Emily Parker	Great Britain	21:03
14	Kira Weis	Germany	21:08
15	Katarzyna Napiórkowska	Poland	21:09
16	Elsa Sundqvist	Sweden	21:11
17	Liv Dinis	Sweden	21:12
18	Mireya Arnedillo	Spain	21:12
19	Megan Harris	Great Britain	21:14
20	Amy Greene	Ireland	21:15
21	Rebecca Flaherty	Great Britain	21:19
22	India Barwell	Great Britain	21:20
23	Nele Heymann	Germany	21:22
24	Thea Charlotte Knutsen	Norway	21:22
25	Ava O'Connor	Ireland	21:24
26	Anika Thompson	Ireland	21:30
27	Daria Domżalska	Poland	21:30
28	Rita Figueiredo	Portugal	21:32
29	Julie Voet	Belgium	21:32
30	Mia Waldmann	Great Britain	21:32
31	Ronja Hofstetter	Switzerland	21:38
32	Sila Bayir	Turkey	21:41
33	Jimena Blanco	Spain	21:43
34	Roise Roberts	Ireland	21:45
35	Carolina Fraquelli	Italy	21:45
36	Małgorzata Karpiuk	Poland	21:45
37	Beatrice Wood	Great Britain	21:46
38	Rocio Garrido	Spain	21:47
39	Emma D'Haene	Belgium	21:47
40	Ida Kraft	Sweden	21:51
41	Merve Karakaya	Turkey	21:52
42	Iva Gieselová	Czech Republic	21:53
43	Marit Griep	Netherlands	21:53
44	Loes Kempe	Netherlands	21:54
45	Yana Pauwelyn	Belgium	21:54
46	Elena Ribigini	Italy	21:55
47	Buse Mayda	Turkey	21:57
48	Lola Darcy	France	21:58
49	Ana Marinho	Portugal	22:00
50	Laura Ribigini	Italy	22:02
51	Marta Castro	Portugal	22:02
52	Beatriz Rios	Portugal	22:06
53	Jade Le Corre	France	22:14
54	Nicole Bauer	Austria	22:19
55	Hannah Enkels	Belgium	22:23
56	Diana Fernandes	Portugal	22:28
57	Alise Petrova	Latvia	22:36
58	Karolina Bliujūte	Lithuania	22:52
59	Gamze Altuntaş	Turkey	23:05
60	Kaisa-Maria Oll	Estonia	23:10
61	Eleonora Višnevskytė	Lithuania	23:22
62	Svetlozara Grozdanova	Bulgaria	24:26
63	Beatriz Azevedo	Portugal	24:47
	Sofia Thøgersen	Denmark	DNF
	Chiara Munaretto	Italy	DNF
	Marte Hovland	Norway	DNF
	Liliana Młynarczyk	Poland	DNF
	Jihad Essoubai	Spain	DNS
	Melissa Fracassini	Italy	DNS
	Uliana Rachynska	Ukraine	DNS

Team race
Rank	Team	Points
1st place, gold medalist(s)	France; Julia David-Smith; Camille Place; Nélie Clément; Lola Darcy; Jade Le Corre	21 (5+7+9)
2nd place, silver medalist(s)	Germany; Pia Schlattmann; Lisa Merkel; Kira Weis; Nele Heymann	21 (3+4+14)
3rd place, bronze medalist(s)	Spain; Maria Forero; Marta Serrano; Mireya Arnedillo; Jimena Blanco; Rocio Garrido	25 (1+6+18)
4	Sweden; Julia Rosén; Elsa Sundqvist; Liv Dinis; Ida Kraft	43 (10+16+17)
5	Great Britain; Emily Parker; Megan Harris; Rebecca Flaherty; India Barwell; Mia Waldmann; Beatrice Wood	53 (13+19+21)
6	Italy; Lucia Arnoldo; Greta Settino; Carolina Fraquelli; Elena Ribigini; Laura Ribigini; Melissa Fracassini; Chiara Munaretto	55 (8+12+35)
7	Ireland; Kirsty Maher; Amy Greene; Ava O'Connor; Anika Thompson; Roise Roberts	56 (11+20+25)
8	Poland; Katarzyna Napiórkowska; Daria Domżalska; Małgorzata Karpiuk; Liliana Młynarczyk	78 (15+27+36)
9	Belgium; Julie Voet; Emma D'Haene; Yana Pauwelyn; Hannah Enkels	113 (29+39+45)
10	Turkey; Sila Bayir; Merve Karakaya; Buse Mayda; Gamze Altuntaş	120 (32+41+47)
11	Portugal; Rita Figueiredo; Ana Marinho; Marta Castro; Beatriz Rios; Diana Fernandes; Beatriz Azevedo	128 (28+49+51)

=== Women's Cross Country U20 Race ===
Individual race
Rank	Athlete	Country	Time (m:s)
1st place, gold medalist(s)	Innes Fitzgerald	Great Britain	14:35
2nd place, silver medalist(s)	Lucie Paturel	France	15:07
3rd place, bronze medalist(s)	Emma Hickey	Ireland	15:10
4	Carmen Cernjul	Sweden	15:14
5	Edibe Yağız	Turkey	15:15
6	Anna Gardiner	Ireland	15:17
7	Fanny Szalkai	Sweden	15:21
8	Evi Falkena	Netherlands	15:23
9	Shirin Kerber	Switzerland	15:25
10	Julia Ehrle	Germany	15:29
11	María Viciosa	Spain	15:30
12	Beth Lewis	United Kingdom	15:30
13	Mara Rolli	Spain	15:31
14	Claudia Gutierrez	Spain	15:33
15	Anouk Danna	Switzerland	15:36
16	Mariana Moreira	Portugal	15:37
17	Liis Kapten	Estonia	15:37
18	Emily Junginger	Germany	15:39
19	Suzanne Harland	Netherlands	15:40
20	Isabel Holt	United Kingdom	15:40
21	Andrea Nygård Vie	Norway	15:41
22	Sandra Gonzalez	Spain	15:44
23	Kyra Verdonck	Belgium	15:44
24	Venus Abraham Teffera	Norway	15:46
25	Olivia Alessandrini	Italy	15:48
26	Ioulianna Roussou	Greece	15:49
27	Alexandra Maria Hudea	Romania	15:50
28	Elif Akçiçek	Turkey	15:51
29	Kaate Mulders	Netherlands	15:52
30	Veronika Břízová	Czech Republic	15:54
31	Sofia Ferrari	Italy	15:54
32	Lera Miller	Germany	15:56
33	Anastasia Nilsson	Sweden	15:56
34	Inge Lugtenberg	Netherlands	15:57
35	Sibilla Vanadziņa	Latvia	15:57
36	Clémentine Byl	Belgium	15:58
37	Eliza Nicholson	United Kingdom	15:58
38	Julia Liebenthal	Poland	15:59
39	Andrea Buenavida	Spain	15:59
40	Havva Efe	Turkey	16:00
41	Ines Herault	Spain	16:01
42	Laly Porentru	France	16:02
43	Louise Bailly	France	16:02
44	Oliwia Piątkowska	Poland	16:03
45	Paloma Ferrari	France	16:04
46	Carolina Correia	Portugal	16:04
47	Lamia Mourabit	France	16:05
48	Zara Redmond	United Kingdom	16:06
49	Vendula Šoukalová	Czech Republic	16:07
50	Martina Ghisalberti	Italy	16:07
51	Tabea Schmid	Austria	16:07
52	Franziska Drexler	Germany	16:08
53	Freja Bjerström	Sweden	16:08
54	Maria Jesus	Portugal	16:10
55	Solange Nunes	Portugal	16:10
56	Lucy Foster	Ireland	16:12
57	Hana Vítková	Czech Republic	16:13
58	Sofiia Hordiichuk	Ukraine	16:13
59	Hanna Strand	Sweden	16:13
60	Noor Jacques	Belgium	16:14
61	Lizzie Wellsted	United Kingdom	16:19
62	Stela Fernandes	Portugal	16:21
63	Flurina Auf Der Maur	Switzerland	16:21
64	Mimosa Miari Fulcis	Italy	16:23
65	Klara Strząbała	Poland	16:24
66	Döndü Kübra Boyraz	Turkey	16:27
67	Majken Söderlund Larsson	Sweden	16:29
68	Daria Dubenets	Ukraine	16:30
69	Laure Verrijcken	Belgium	16:31
70	Sara Yasmin Abid	Norway	16:32
71	Naomi Ben David	Israel	16:32
72	Cátia Khvas	Portugal	16:33
73	Sofia Sidenius	Italy	16:33
74	Lenuta Constantin	Romania	16:36
75	Licia Ferrari	Italy	16:39
76	Hannah Lösel	Germany	16:41
77	Aurina Coletti	Switzerland	16:41
78	Eimear Cooney	Ireland	16:43
79	Abby Smith	Ireland	16:43
80	Klara Močnik	Slovenia	16:44
81	Mejra Mehmedović	Serbia	16:46
82	Ayala Harris	Israel	16:47
83	Ema Pika Raj	Slovenia	16:48
84	Ofri Yacobi	Israel	16:50
85	Lara Balažic	Slovenia	16:53
86	Adéla Štefanová	Czech Republic	16:57
87	Ilvana Fleurine Markovic	Slovenia	16:59
88	Ana Vita Verneker	Slovenia	17:02
89	Anika Atanasova	Bulgaria	17:06
90	Andreea Denisa Horlescu	Romania	17:15
91	Olha Pravetska	Ukraine	17:20
92	Zuzanna Czyż	Poland	17:22
93	Pamela Eni	Bulgaria	17:24
	Austra Ošiņa	Latvia	DNF
	Anja Bezlaj	Slovenia	DNF
	Elif Naz Köseoğlu	Turkey	DNF

Team race
Rank	Team	Points
1st place, gold medalist(s)	Great Britain; Innes Fitzgerald; Beth Lewis; Isabel Holt; Eliza Nicholson; Zara Redmond; Lizzie Wellsted	33 (1+12+20ׁׁ)
2nd place, silver medalist(s)	Spain; María Viciosa; Mara Rolli; Claudia Gutierrez; Sandra Gonzalez; Andrea Buenavida; Ines Herault	38 (11+13+14)
3rd place, bronze medalist(s)	Sweden; Carmen Cernjul; Fanny Szalkai; Anastasia Nilsson; Freja Bjerström; Hanna Strand; Majken Söderlund Larsson	44 (4+7+33)
4	Netherlands; Evi Falkena; Suzanne Harland; Kaate Mulders; Inge Lugtenberg	56 (8+19+29)
5	Germany; Julia Ehrle; Emily Junginger; Lera Miller; Franziska Drexler; Hannah Lösel	60 (10+18+32)
6	Ireland; Emma Hickey; Anna Gardiner; Lucy Foster; Eimear Cooney; Abby Smith	65 (3+6+56)
7	Turkey; Edibe Yağız; Elif Akçiçek; Havva Efe; Döndü Kübra Boyraz; Elif Naz Köseoğlu	73 (5+28+40)
8	France; Lucie Paturel; Laly Porentru; Louise Bailly; Paloma Ferrari; Lamia Mouabit	87 (2+42+43)
9	Switzerland; Shirin Kerber; Anouk Danna; Flurina Auf Der Maur; Aurina Coletti	87 (9+15+63)
10	Italy; Olivia Alessandrini; Sofia Ferrari; Martina Ghisalberti; Mimosa Miari Fulcis; Sofia Sidenius; Licia Ferrari	106 (25+31+50)
11	Norway; Andrea Nygård Vie; Venus Abraham Teffera; Sara Yasmin Abid	115 (21+24+70)
12	Portugal; Mariana Moreira; Carolina Correia; Maria Jesus; Solange Nunes; Stela Fernandes; Cátia Khvas	116 (16+46+54)
13	Belgium; Kyra Verdonck; Clémentine Byl; Noor Jacques; Laure Verrijcken	119 (23+36+60)
14	Czech Republic; Veronika Brízová; Vendula Šoukalová; Hana Vítková; Adéla Štefanová	136 (30+49+57)
15	Poland; Julia Liebenthal; Oliwia Piątkowska; Klara Strząbała; Zuzanna Czyż	147 (38+44+65)
16	Romania; Alexandra Maria Hudea; Lenuta Constantin; Andreea Denisa Hoplescu	191 (27+74+90)
17	Ukraine; Sofiia Hordiichuk; Daria Dubenets; Olha Pravetska	217 (58+68+91)
18	Israel; Naomi Ben David; Ayala Harris; Ofri Yacobi	237 (71+82+84)
19	Slovenia; Klara Močnik; Ema Pika Raj; Lara Balažić; Ilvana Fleurine Markovic; Ana Vita Verneker; Anja Bežlaj	248 (80+83+85)

=== Men's Cross Country U20 Race ===
Individual race
Rank	Athlete	Country	Time (m:s)
1st place, gold medalist(s)	Willem Renders	Belgium	13:11
2nd place, silver medalist(s)	Oscar Gaitan	Spain	13:12
3rd place, bronze medalist(s)	Aloïs Abraham	France	13:19
4	Ali Tunç	Turkey	13:19
5	Magnus Øyen	Norway	13:24
6	Sem Serrano	Belgium	13:29
7	Ilyes Druez	Belgium	13:29
8	Matthieu Bührer	Switzerland	13:31
9	Adam Červinka	Czech Republic	13:31
10	Noah Harris	Ireland	13:32
11	David Scheller	Germany	13:32
12	William Sean Rabjohns	United Kingdom	13:33
13	Cormac Dixon	Ireland	13:33
14	Alejandro Ibañez	Spain	13:36
15	Alex Lennon	United Kingdom	13:37
16	Karl Ottfalk	Sweden	13:38
17	Bertold Kalász	Hungary	13:38
18	Michael Clark	United Kingdom	13:39
19	Aldin Ćatović	Serbia	13:39
20	Come Le Baron	France	13:44
21	Tiago Jorge	Portugal	13:45
22	Aleksander Okruciński	Poland	13:45
23	Loïc Berger	Switzerland	13:46
24	Aleksi Ahlfors	Finland	13:49
25	Yonis Dunet	France	13:51
26	Benjámin Szabó	Hungary	13:52
27	Paul-Mathieu Lannuzel	France	13:53
28	Sebastian Stagh	Sweden	13:54
29	Kristers Kudlis	Latvia	13:54
30	Ander Aramendi	Spain	13:55
31	Quinn Miell-Ingram	United Kingdom	13:55
32	Sebastian Lörstad	Sweden	13:55
33	Nahom Tesfalem Tewelde	Norway	13:56
34	Kristian Bråthen Børve	Norway	13:56
35	Elliot Vermeulen	Belgium	13:56
36	Caolan McFadden	Ireland	13:57
37	Théotime Popea	Switzerland	13:57
38	Vittore Simone Borromini	Italy	13:58
39	Lewe Teuber	Germany	13:59
40	Andres Lara	Spain	13:59
41	Jakub Abramczyk	Poland	14:00
42	Leni Remer Mancini	France	14:01
43	Hugo Witteveen	Switzerland	14:02
44	Filip Jančík	Slovakia	14:05
45	Atakan Enes Çiçek	Turkey	14:05
46	Christopher Dahlmeyer	Germany	14:06
47	Lucian Florin Ștefan	Romania	14:07
48	Giacomo Bellillo	Italy	14:07
49	Jonson Hughes	United Kingdom	14:08
50	Erik Nederheim	Sweden	14:09
51	Jonas Beutler	Switzerland	14:09
52	Levin Saveur	Germany	14:09
53	Leonardo Oliveira	Portugal	14:09
54	Lenny Fred Riebe	Germany	14:10
55	Luke Dunham	United Kingdom	14:10
56	Alex Hulka	Slovakia	14:10
57	Mihai-Alin Șavlovschi	Romania	14:11
58	Enrico Ricci	Italy	14:11
59	Leo Rajaniemi	Finland	14:12
60	Artem Rybka	Ukraine	14:12
61	Jochem Wiersma	Netherlands	14:13
62	Mario Palencia	Spain	14:13
63	Eden Kotilainen	Finland	14:14
64	Kiyasettin Kara	Turkey	14:15
65	Finn Diver	Ireland	14:15
66	Luigi Alessio Turrin	Italy	14:15
67	Tom Breslin	Ireland	14:15
68	Sebastian Smed Grønkjær	Denmark	14:16
69	Guillermo Sanchez	Spain	14:18
70	Tudor Mihai Margasoiu	Romania	14:18
71	Federico Giardiello	Italy	14:20
72	Poli Stoffel	Luxembourg	14:22
73	Rostyslav Matkovskyi	Ukraine	14:22
74	Anton Broggini	Switzerland	14:22
75	Manuel Dos Santos	Portugal	14:22
76	Tiago Machado	Portugal	14:26
77	Niels Elton Jokumsen	Denmark	14:31
78	Denys Lysenko	Ukraine	14:31
79	Arbel Henzel	Israel	14:31
80	Damien Pechon	Luxembourg	14:31
81	Pancho Panchev	Bulgaria	14:34
82	Antoni Gulbinowicz	Poland	14:35
83	Afonso Alemão	Portugal	14:37
84	Rihards Sitniks	Latvia	14:38
85	Dominik Ivančík	Slovakia	14:45
86	Žiga Verneker	Slovenia	14:51
87	Aviv Ochman	Israel	14:54
88	Taras Heshko	Ukraine	14:56
89	Filip Cmok	Slovenia	14:58
90	Albert Szirbek	Hungary	14:59
91	Azat Özkan	Turkey	15:04
92	Žan Ogrinc	Slovenia	15:11
93	Antoni Jarosz	Poland	15:15
94	Lenart Mihalič	Slovenia	15:25
95	Finley Cant	Gibraltar	16:26
96	Arame Musaelyan	Armenia	17:18
	Sebastian Bræmer Nygaard	Denmark	DNF
	William Thøgersen	Denmark	DNF
	Alessandro Santangelo	Italy	DNF
	Ralfs Dzosens	Latvia	DNF
	Lukas Buncic	Norway	DNF
	Håkon Moe Berg	Norway	DNF
	Duarte Vilas Boas	Portugal	DNF

Team race
Rank	Team	Points
1st place, gold medalist(s)	Belgium; Willem Renders; Sem Serrano; Jules Druez; Elliot Vermeulen	14 (1+6+7)
2nd place, silver medalist(s)	United Kingdom; William Sean Rabjohns; Alex Lennon; Michael Ciarle; Quinn Miell-Ingram; Jonson Hughes; Luke Dunham	45 (12+15+18)
3rd place, bronze medalist(s)	Spain; Oscar Gaitan; Alejandro Ibáñez; Ander Aramendi; Andres Lara; Mario Palencia; Guillermo Sanchez	46 (2+14+30)
4	France; Alois Abraham; Come Le Baron; Yonis Dunet; Paul-Mathieu Lannuzel; Leni Remer Mancini	48 (3+20+25)
5	Ireland; Noah Harris; Cormac Dixon; Caolan McFadden; Finn Diver; Tom Breslin	59 (10+13+36)
6	Switzerland; Matthieu Bührer; Loïc Berger; Théotime Popea; Hugo Witteveen; Jonas Beutler; Anton Broggini	68 (8+23+37)
7	Norway; Magnus Øyen; Nahom Tesfalem Tewelde; Kristian Bråthen Børve; Lukas Buncic; Håkon Moe Berg	72 (5+33+34)
8	Sweden; Karl Ottfalk; Sebastian Stagh; Sebastian Lörstad; Erik Nederheim	76 (16+28+32)
9	Germany; David Scheller; Lewe Teuber; Christopher Dahlmeyer; Levin Sauver; Lenny Fred Riebe	96 (11+39+46)
10	Turkey; Ali Tunç; Atakan Enes Çiçek; Kiyasettin Kara; Azat Özkan	113 (4+45+64)
11	Hungary; Bertold Kalász; Benjámin Szabó; Albert Szirbek	133 (17+26+90)
12	Italy; Vittore Simone Borromini; Giacomo Bellillo; Enrico Ricci; Luigi Alessio Turrin; Federico Giardiello; Alessandro Santangelo	144 (38+48+58)
13	Poland; Aleksander Okruciński; Jakub Abramczyk; Antoni Gulbinowicz; Antoni Jarosz	145 (22+41+82)
14	Finland; Aleksi Ahlefors; Leo Raajaniemi; Eden Kotilainen	146 (24+59+63)
15	Portugal; Tiago Jorge; Leonardo Oliveira; Manuel Dos Santos; Tiago Machado; Afonso Alemão; Duarte Vilas Boas	149 (21+53+75)
16	Romania; Lucian Florin Ștefan; Mihai-Alin Șavlovschi; Tudor Mihai Margașoiu	174 (47+57+70)
17	Slovakia; Filip Jančík; Alex Hulka; Dominik Ivančík	185 (44+56+85)
18	Ukraine; Artem Rybka; Rostyslav Matkovskyi; Denys Lysenko; Taras Heshko	211 (60+73+78)
19	Slovenia; Žiga Verneker; Filip Cmok; Žan Ogrinc; Lenart Mihalič; Tjaž Djaip	267 (86+89+92)
	Latvia; Kristers Kudlis; Rihards Sitniks; Ralfs Dzosens	NM
	Denmark; Sebastian Smed Grønkjær; Niels Elton Jokumsen; Sebastian Bræmer Nygaard; William Thøgersen	NM

=== Mixed Cross Country Relay ===
4 x 1.5 km Team race
Rank	Nation	Team	Time
1st place, gold medalist(s)	Italy	Gaia Sabbatini, Sebastiano Parolini, Marta Zenoni, Pietro Arese	17:12
2nd place, silver medalist(s)	Portugal	Patricia Silva, Rodrigo Lima, Salomé Afonso, Isaac Nader	17:16
3rd place, bronze medalist(s)	Great Britain	Ava Lloyd, Jack Higgins, Holly Dixon, Callum Elson	17:17
4	France	Bérénice Fulchiron, Antoine Senard, Emilie Girard, Maël Gouyette	17:18
5	Belgium	Laure Bilo, Ward Leunckens, Marie Bilo, Tibaut Vandelannoote	17:21
6	Ireland	Eimear Maher, Cian McPhillips, Laura Nicholson, Andrew Coscoran	17:22
7	Spain	Marta Mitjans, Mariano García, Esther Guerreri, Mohamed Attaoui	17:34
8	Netherlands	Yasmine Abbes, Rick Van Riel, Sarah Peerik, Robin Van Riel	17:35
9	Germany	Verena Meisl, Jens Mergenthaler, Vera Coutellier, Marvin Heinrich	17:37
10	Poland	Julia Gruchała, Kacper Lewalski, Martyna Krawczyńska, Bartosz Kitliński	17:42
11	Denmark	Juliane Hvid, Nick Rostgaard Jensen, Annemarie Nissen, Markus Kirk Kjeldsen	17:53
12	Switzerland	Chiara Scherrer, Navid Kerber, Delia Sclabas, Silas Zurfluh	17:58
13	Ukraine	Oksana Dolynchuk, Vadym Lonskyi, Tetiana Chornovol, Dmytrii Nikolaichuk	18:01
14	Turkey	Turkey Mevlüt Aras, Damla Çelik, Recep Istek, Tuğba Toptas	18:20
15	Bulgaria	Lilyana Georgieva, Martin Balabanov, Silviya Georgieva, Martin Prodanov	18:44
