= William Rabjohns =

British middle-distance runner (born 2006)

- Rabjohns in 2026

Personal information
- Full name: William Sean Rabjohns
- Born: 11 February 2006 (age 20)

Sport
- Sport: Athletics
- Events: Middle-distance running, Cross country running

Achievements and titles
- Personal bests: 800m: 1:45.41 (Watford, 2025); 1500m: 3:41.55 (London, 2025); Mile: 4:06.64 (Oxford, 2024); 3000m: 8:27.90 (Loughborough, 2025); 5km (road) 14:24 (Leicester, 2025)
Medal record
Men's athletics
Representing Great Britain
European Cross Country Championships
| Silver medal – second place | 2025 Lagoa | U20 team |

William Sean Rabjohns (born 11 February 2006) is a professional British middle-distance and cross-country runner. He has a pro contract with On (company) and is a member of the Loughborough based group, mtg, where he attends university.

== Biography ==
From Dorset, Rabjohns attended Queen Elizabeth's School, Wimborne Minster. He is a member of Poole Athletic Club.

In November 2024, Rabjohns finished second in the men's under-20 race at the Liverpool Cross Challenge earn selection for the British U20 team to compete at the 2024 European Cross Country Championships in Antalya, Turkey. He competed for Great Britain at the 2024 World Athletics U20 Championships in Lima, Peru, over 800 metres.

Rabjohns placed second at the UK Athletics U20 Cross Challenge Final and UK Inter Counties Championships in Nottingham, finishing runner-up to Aron Gebremariam in March 2025. In May 2025, he won the Gandy Mile run competing for Team England at the Loughborough International. In July 2025, he won the U20 title over 800 metres at the England U20 Championships in Birmingham in 1:48.45.

He was named in the British team for the 800 metres at the 2025 European Athletics U20 Championships in Tampere, Finland. At the championships, he won his heat to qualify for the final in 1:49.01. In the final, however, he was disqualified for running off the track to keep his balance following a racing incident. Rafferty Mirfin was ultimately awarded the victory with fellow Brit Tom Waterworth winning silver and Aaron Ceballos Spain promoted to bronze. In October 2025, he was named on the British Athletics Olympic Futures Programme for 2025/26.

On 8 November, he won the men's U20 race at the Cardiff Cross Challenge in Wales. The following week, he was runner-up to Michael Clark at the Liverpool Cross Challenge. He was subsequently selected for the 2025 European Cross Country Championships in Lagoa, Portugal, in December 2025, placing twelfth in the individual race, helping the British team alongside Clark and Alex Lennon, to win the U20 team silver medal.

In May 2026, Rabjohns won the British Universities and Colleges Sport (BUCS) Outdoor Championships title over 800 metres. In October 2026, he was retained on the 2026/27 Olympic Futures Programme awarded by UK Athletics.
