= Anna Gardiner =

Irish athlete

Personal information
- Nationality: Ireland
- Born: 30 March 2006 (age 20)

Sport
- Sport: Athletics
- Events: Middle distance, Steeplechase, Cross country

Achievements and titles
- Personal bests: 1500m: 4:29.64 (Dedham, 2025); 3000m: 9:26.44 (Providence, 2025); 5000m: 15:51.78 (Providence, 2026)

Anna Gardiner (born 30 March 2006) is an Irish middle- and long-distance and cross country runner. In 2023, she became All-Ireland U20 cross country champion aged 17 years-old.

== Career ==
=== 2022 ===
A member of East Down Athletics Club, Gardiner won the NI & Ulster U-18 Championship cross country title in Comber in November 2022. She won a gold medal in the U-18 age category at the All-Ireland Cross Country Championships in County Donegal. Subsequently, Gardiner made her international debut at the 2022 European Cross Country Championships in Turin in the U20 race, despite being just 16 years-old.

=== 2023 ===
In January 2023, she travelled to Belgium to take part in the World Athletics Cross Country Tour Gold meeting as part of the Ireland U20 team finishing in sixth place. In February 2023, she won the Ulster Schools title, and the following month claimed the All-Ireland schools title.

She competed in the 3000m at the 2023 Commonwealth Youth Games in Trinidad and Tobago in August 2023.

In November 2023, she claimed All-Ireland U18 and U20 titles at the 2023 Irish National Cross Country Championships in Gowran, Kilkenny. She was selected for the 2023 European Cross Country Championships in Brussels, in which she finished seventh in the U20 race.

=== 2024 ===
In March 2024, Gardiner won the 2024 All Ireland Schools Cross Country Championships which were hosted at Tymon Park in Tallaght, Dublin. Subsequently, she was selected for the 2024 World Athletics Cross Country Championships U20 race in Serbia, placing 37th overall with the race on her 18th birthday. In May 2024, she was runner up at the Irish schools championships in Tullamore over 3000 metres. In November 2024, she was part of the Providence College team which ran the 2024 NCAA Division I Cross Country Championships. She ran in the U20 race at the 2024 European Athletics Championship in Antalya, Turkey, and was the leading Irish woman, placing nineteenth overall and helping the Irish team to sixth overall.

=== 2025 ===
As a sophomore, Gardiner placed sixth overall for Providence at the BIG EAST Championship on October 31, 2025, leading the team to a third-place finish. She then placed sixth at the NCAA Northeast Cross Country Regionals 2025, to lead Providence to a second-place finish in the team competition. On 22 November, she ran for Providence at the NCAA Country Championships in Missouri. She was selected to represent Ireland at the 2025 European Cross Country Championships in Portugal in December 2025, alongside Lucy Foster and Emma Hickey, where she placed sixth overall in the women's under-20 race.

=== 2026 ===
In April 2026, Gardiner won the 5000 metres at the Friar Invitational in a facility record and personal-best time of 15:51.78. Gardiner won the 5000 metres at the 2026 Big East Conference Championships in May, running 16:50.43 to finish ahead of Almi Nerurker. In October, she placed fifth in the Big East Conference Cross Country Championship race, helping Providence to a first women's team title since 2016.

== Personal life ==
Gardiner attended Assumption Grammar School in Ballynahinch, County Down. In 2024, she enrolled at Providence College in Rhode Island.
