= Freddie Rowe =

British middle-distance runner (born 2009)

Personal information
- Nationality: British (English)
- Born: 2 April 2009 (age 17)

Sport
- Sport: Athletics
- Event: Middle-distance running

Achievements and titles
- Personal bests: 800m: 1:49.36 (2025); 1500m: 3:40.26 (2026); Mile: 4:00.88 (2026); 3000m: 8:38.88 (2023)
Medal record
Men's athletics
Representing Great Britain
European U18 Championships
Gold medal – first place	2026 Rieti	1500m

Freddie Rowe (born 2 April 2009) is a British middle-distance runner. He won the gold medal at the 2026 European Athletics U18 Championships over 1500 metres.

== Biography ==
A member of Havering Athletics Club, Rowe-Deacon started in athletics after encouragement from a teacher at school and is coached by Patrick Gahagan. In July 2025, he was runner-up to Evan Grime in the under-18 men’s 1500 metres at the English Schools Championships.

Rowe won the men's under-18 race at the 2026 Mini London Marathon. As a 17 year-old in May 2026, Rowe became the youngest winner of the Bannister Mile in Oxford, running a time of 4:00.88, the third fastest British U18 mile all-time, behind Steve Ovett and Steve Cram. He was named in the GB & NI U20 team for the 2026 Loughborough International in May 2026, winning the Gandy Mile ahead of Ted Higgins. That month, he lowered his 1500 personal best to 3:40.26 at the British Milers Club Grand Prix meeting in Birmingham. Rowe was selected as a member of the Great Britain team for the 2026 European Athletics U18 Championships in Rieti, Italy. On 19 July, he won the gold medal in the 1500 metres, winning ahead of compatriot Alistair Street. In October 2026, he was selected for the 2026/27 Olympic Futures Programme awarded by UK Athletics.
