= Callum Elson =

British athlete

- Elson in 2026

Personal information
- Nationality: Great Britain
- Born: 31 December 1998 (age 27)
- Education: Collingwood College, Durham (BA)

Sport
- Sport: Athletics
- Event: Mile
- Club: Cambridge & Coleridge

Achievements and titles
- Personal bests: 800m 1:48.99 (Bury, 2025); 1500m 3:35.39 (London, 2023); One Mile 3:53.22i (Boston, 2024); 3000m 7:52.08i (Birmingham, 2025); 5000m 13:35.26 (London, 2025); 10,000m 30:11.87 (Leeds, 2021); One Mile Road: 3:56.41 (Riga, 2023); 5k Road: 13:37 (Leicester, 2025)
Medal record
Men's athletics
Representing Great Britain
World Road Running Championships
Silver medal – second place	2023 Riga	Mile
European Cross Country Championships
Bronze medal – third place	2025 Lagoa	Mixed relay

Callum Elson (born 31 December 1998) is a British middle-distance and cross-country runner. He won a silver medal in the road mile at the 2023 World Athletics Road Running Championships and a bronze medal in the mixed relay at the 2025 European Cross Country Championships.

== Biography ==
A Cambridge and Coleridge athlete, Elson ran as a youngster and finished 16th in the English Schools Cross Country Champs in 2017, but while at the University of Durham concentrated on playing football and only began running seriously again during the COVID-19 pandemic. He studied for an MBA at American International College in Springfield, Massachusetts and returned to the UK having won NCAA division II mile (indoor) and 1500m (outdoor) titles in 2022.

He represented Britain for the first time at the European Cross Country Championships in Turin, Italy in December 2022. In February 2023, he was selected to compete for Great Britain in the mixed relay competing alongside Joe Wigfield, Alex Bell and Alexandra Millard at the 2023 World Athletics Cross Country Championships in Bathurst, New South Wales, as the British team placed sixth overall.

Elson ran a new area record time of 3:56.41 to win the silver medal in the road mile at the 2023 World Athletics Road Running Championships in Riga. He was selected for the 2023 European Cross Country Championships in Brussels in December 2023.

On 18 February 2024, he was runner-up at the 2024 British Indoor Athletics Championships in Birmingham, over 1500 metres. He was selected for the 2024 World Athletics Indoor Championships in Glasgow. However, he suffered an achiles injury at the event and did not return to the track until February 2025. He was runner-up to Jack Higgins in the men's mile at the Cardiff Cross Challenge on 8 November 2025 and was subsequently selected for the British mixed relay team to compete at the 2025 European Cross Country Championships, where he won the bronze medal alongside Higgins, Ava Lloyd and Holly Dixon.

In April 2026, he helped Cambridge and Coleridge to a third place finish at the 2026 the British national road relay championships. In June, he qualified for the final of the 1500 metres at the 2026 British Championships. In November, he placed fifth at the Cardiff Cross Challenge, a silver label race on the World Athletics Cross Country Tour.

== Personal life ==
During his teens, Elson lived in Leeds - studying at Roundhay School in the same year group as Olympic cyclist Tom Pidcock OBE. In the early 2020s, Elson began recording his athletics journey on social media using the moniker "The Distance Project". A football fan, he is a supporter of Leeds United.
