= Ava Lloyd =

British athlete

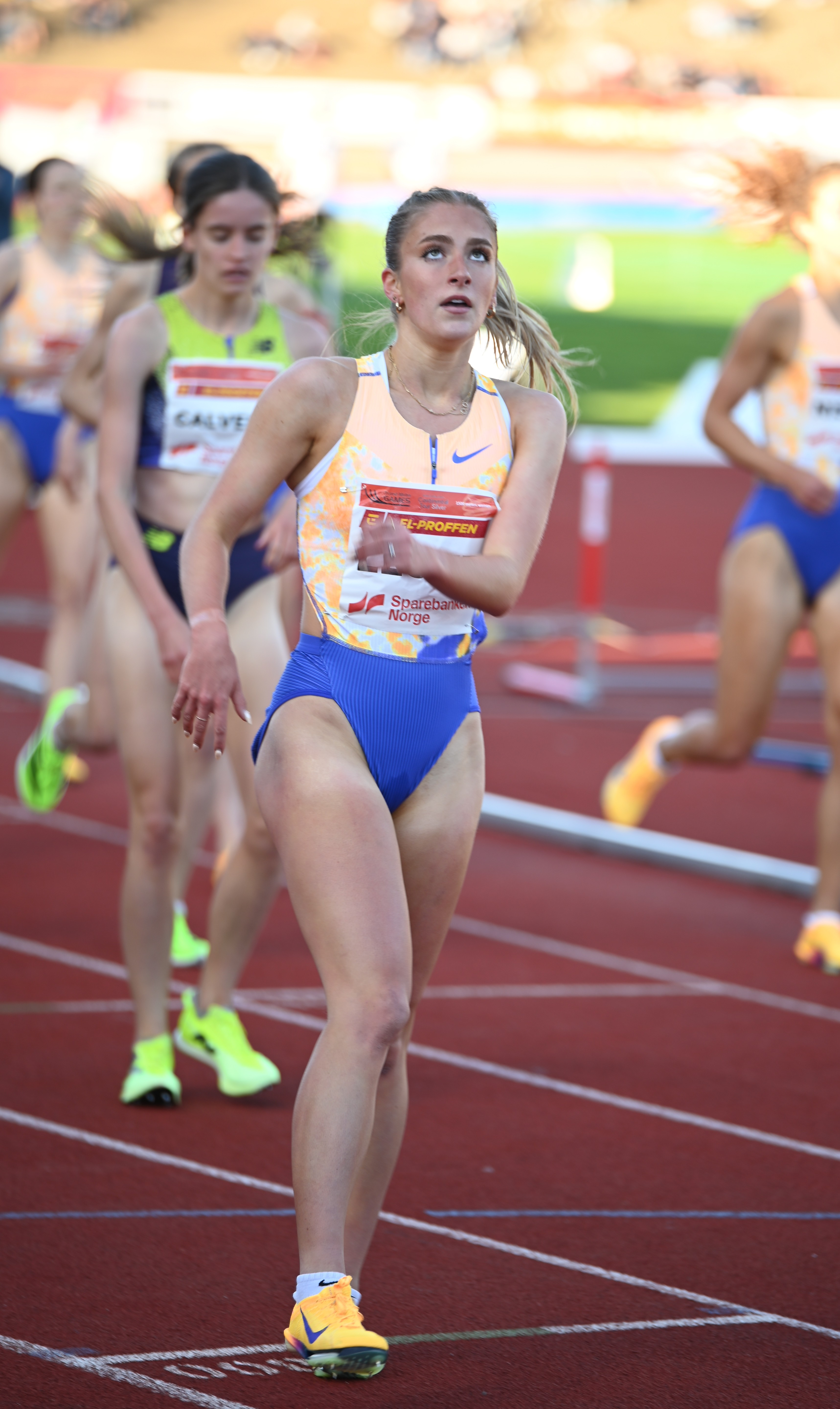
- Ava Lloyd in 2026

Personal information
- Nationality: British (Welsh)
- Born: 13 August 2005 (age 21)

Sport
- Sport: Athletics
- Event: Middle distance

Achievements and titles
- Personal bests: 800m: 2:02.17 (Tooting, 2025); 1500m: 4:06.45 (Leuven, 2025); Mile 4:43.59 (Loughborough, 2024)
Medal record
Women's athletics
Representing Great Britain
European Cross Country Championships
Bronze medal – third place	2025 Lagoa	Mixed relay

Ava Lloyd (born 13 August 2005) is a British middle-distance runner. She made her senior championship debut over 1500 metres for Great Britain at the 2025 European Athletics Indoor Championships.

== Biography ==
A Wigan and District athlete, and a member of Wigan Harriers, she is also a member of the same M11 Track Club training group as British middle distance runners Keely Hodgkinson and Georgia Bell, coached by Trevor Painter and Jenny Meadows.

She placed tenth at the 2023 European Athletics U20 Championships in Jerusalem, Israel, with a 1500 metres time of 4:23.78.

She ran 4:12.07 at the Watford BMC Grand Prix in June 2024 for the 1500 metres. She reached the final of the 1500 metres at the 2024 World Athletics U20 Championships in Lima, Peru, placing fifth in the final. In November 2024, she was named by British Athletics on the Olympic Futures Programme for 2025.

She set a personal best indoor time of 4:12.59 for the 1500 metres at the Keeley Klassik on 16 February 2025 in Birmingham, England. The following week, she placed qualified for the final and placed fifth overall in the 1500 metres at the 2025 British Indoor Athletics Championships in a time of 4:17.52, on the same track in Birmingham. She was subsequently selected to make her major championship debut for the senior British team at the 2025 European Athletics Indoor Championships in Apeldoorn, Netherlands. Competing at the championships, she ran a time of 4:18.74 in her qualifying heat to finish in sixth place and did not proceed to the final.

She was named in the British team for the 2025 European Athletics U23 Championships in Bergen, winning her 1500 metres semi-final in 4:14.55, before placing tenth in the final. On 3 August, she placed fifth in the final of the 1500 metres at the 2025 UK Athletics Championships in Birmingham. Later that month, she ran the women’s 800m A race at the BMC Trafford Grand Prix in a new personal best of 2:02.57.

In October 2025, she was retained on the British Athletics Olympic Futures Programme for 2025/26. She was runner-up to Holly Dixon in the women's mile at the Cardiff Cross Challenge on 8 November 2025 and was subsequently selected for the British mixed relay team for the 2025 European Cross Country Championships, where she won the bronze medal alongside Jack Higgins, Callum Elson and Dixon. On 3 February 2026, she lowered her indoor personal best for the 1500 metres to 4:09.81 at the Golden Gala in Ostrava. She was a finalist over 1500 metres at the 2026 British Indoor Athletics Championships in Birmingham, placing fourth overall. In May, Lloyd finished second with 4:07.04 for the 1500m at The Belfast Classic. In June, she placed fifth in the final of the 1500 metres at the 2026 UK Championships.

Lloyd was selected as part of the Welsh team for the 2026 Commonwealth Games. In October 2026, she was retained on the 2026/27 Olympic Futures Programme awarded by UK Athletics.
