= Elliot Vermeulen =

Belgian middle-distance runner (born 2006)

Personal information
- Born: 26 April 2006 (age 20)

Sport
- Sport: Athletics
- Event: Middle-distance running

Achievements and titles
- Personal best(s): 800m: 1:45.04 (2025) NU20R; 1500m: 3:33.51 (2025) NU20R; 3000m: 8:20.65 (2023); Indoor; 800m: 1:54.96 (2024); 1500m: 3:39.48 (2026); Mile 4:00.48 (2025) NU20R
Medal record
Men's athletics
Representing Belgium
European U20 Championships
Bronze medal – third place	2025 Tampere	1500 m

Elliot Vermeulen (born 26 April 2006) is a Belgian middle-distance runner. He was Belgian champion over 3000 metres in 2023 and the bronze medalist over 1500 metres at the European Athletics U20 Championships. He is the Belgian under-20 national record holder over 800 metres and 1500 metres.

== Biography ==
From Brussels, Vermeulen is a member of Royal White Star Athletic in Woluwe-Saint-Lambert, where he is coached by Tim Moriau. He was a keen footballer playing as a central defender before focusing on athletics. He is a training partner of European under-20 cross country champion Willem Renders. Vermeulen was Belgian champion over 3000 metres in April 2023 in 8:20.65 in Huizingen.

Competing indoors in January 2025 in Luxembourg, Vermaelen set a Belgian under-20 indoor national record for the 1500 metres. He won the U20 mile run at the New Balance Indoor Grand Prix in February 2025.

In June 2025, Vermeulen ran 1:47.38 for the 800 metres in Oordegem, improving his personal best by almost three seconds and moving to second on the Belgian under-20 all-time list behind Elliott Crestan. Vermeulen won the bronze medal at the 2025 European Athletics U20 Championships over 1500 metres in August 2025 in Tampere, Finland, finishing behind Hakon Moe Berg and Andreas Dybdahl, but running a personal best of 3:38.65, having qualified for the final with the fastest time. Later that month, he ran a new Belgian under-20 record for the 800 metres in Pfungstadt, Germany, of 1:45.04. In September, Vermeulen ran a lifetime best and Belgian under-20 record of 3:33.51 for the 1500 metres in Trier, Germany, to move to fourth on the European all-time U20 list behind Niels Laros, Jakob Ingebrigtsen and Hakon Moe Berg. He competed for Belgium at the 2025 European Cross Country Championships in Lagoa, Portugal in December 2025.

On 8 February 2026, Vermuelen placed over 1500 metres at the Sparkassen Indoor Meeting Dortmund, a World Athletics Indoor Tour Bronze meeting, running 3:39.48, an indoor personal best.
