= Alex Lennon (runner) =

British runner (born 2008)

Personal information
- Born: 28 April 2008 (age 18)

Sport
- Sport: Athletics
- Events: Middle-distance running, Cross Country running

Achievements and titles
- Personal bests: 1500m: 3:48.17 (Loughborough, 2024); Mile: 4:13.31 (Philadelphia, 2025); 3000m: 8:23.29 (Twickenham, 2025)
Medal record
Men's athletics
Representing Great Britain
European Cross Country Championships
Silver medal – second place	2025 Lagoa	U20 team

Alex Lennon (born 28 April 2008) is a British middle-distance and cross country runner. He was a silver medalist in the team under-20 event at the 2025 European Cross Country Championships.

== Career ==
Lennon attended Wilson's School in the London Borough of Sutton, and trains as a member of Sutton & District AC. In October 2022, he helped his Sutton team win the under-15 boys title running cross country at the ERRA Autumn Relays. He also won the English Schools title for his age-group over 1500 metres. In November 2023, he won the under-17 race at the Cardiff Cross Challenge.

Lennon placed fifth over 1500 metres at the 2024 European Athletics U18 Championships in Banská Bystrica, Slovakia, in July 2024.

In the spring of 2025, Lennon won the under-17 men's English National cross-country race at Parliament Hill, the under-17 Inter Counties cross country title, and the English Schools Cross Country senior boys' race.

In October 2025, Lennon made his debut for the England Cross Country team in the Belgium Cross Cup junior men event, the Cross Cup van West-Vlaanderen in Roeselare, placing fourth. Lennon placed third behind Michael Clark and William Rabjohns in the men's under 20 race at the Liverpool Cross Challenge in November 2025 with only three seconds between the three at the finish. He was subsequently selected for the European Cross Country Championships in Lagoa, Portugal on 14 December 2025. Lennon placed fifteenth in the individual race, helping the British team to win the U20 team silver medal alongside Rabjohns and Clark.

In January 2026, Lennon competed for the British team in the under-20 race at the 2026 World Athletics Cross Country Championships in Tallahassee, Florida, placing 31st overall. On 7 March, he won the U20 title at the UK Athletics Cross Challenge Final and UK Inter Counties Championships in Nottingham. The following weekend, he won the English Schools Cross Country Championships in Sefton Park.
