= Ted Higgins =

British athlete (born 2001)

Personal information
- Nationality: British
- Born: 20 September 2001 (age 24)

Sport
- Sport: Athletics
- Event: Middle distance running

Achievements and titles
- Personal bests: 800m: 1:46.28 (2026); 1500m: 3:34.89 (2026); Mile: 3:54.61 (2026); 3000m: 8:33.48 (2024); Indoor; 800m: 1:49.40 (2025); 1500m: 3:39.52 (2006); Mile: 4:01.81 (2025)

Ted Higgins (born 20 September 2001) is a British middle-distance and cross country runner.

== Biography ==
His twin brother Jack is also a middle-distance runner with both running for Tonbridge Athletics Club.

In December 2025, Higgins ran 7:57.31 over 3000 metres to win the South of England indoor title and took part in his first official 5 km race on the roads in Battersea on 31 December, placing second in 13:38 behind Joe Wigfield.

Higgins opened 2026 with an indoor personal best over 1500 metres in Sheffield, running 3:39.52 to finish three hundredths of a second in front of his brother Jack. Higgins ran 3:57.05 for the indoor mile at Lee Valley in February 2026. Later that month, he ran a personal best 7:53.21 to place third overall in the 3000 metres at the 2026 British Indoor Athletics Championships in Birmingham behind Tom Keen and Henry McLuckie. Later that month, he had a top-five finish at the English National Cross Country Championships in Sedgefield. In April, Higgins ran the third fastest time overall as he helped Tonbridge AC to a second place finish at the 2026 the British national road relay championships. In May, Higgins finished third with a time of 3:39.73 for the 1500m at The Belfast Classic. In May, he also won over 800 metres competing for Tonbridge in the National Athletics League opener in Derby. That month, he was named in the England team for the 2026 Loughborough International, finishing runner-up to Freddie Rowe in the Gandy Mile. In June, he won over 1500 metres at the Josef Odložil Memorial in Prague. That month, he qualified for the final of the 1500 metres at the 2026 British Championships, placing fourth overall. In July, he finished second in the mile to Reuben Reina at the Cork City Sports in Ireland.
