= Holly Dixon =

British long-distance runner (born 1997)

Personal information
- Born: 23 December 1997 (age 28)

Sport
- Sport: Athletics
- Event(s): Middle-distance running, Cross country running

Achievements and titles
- Personal best(s): 800m: 2:05.54 (2025); 1500m: 4:08.95 (2026); Mile: 4:40.05 (2025); 3000m: 9:15.20 (2024); 5000m: 15:41.85 (2025)
Medal record
Women's athletics
Representing Great Britain
European Cross Country Championships
Silver medal – second place	2025 Lagoa	Mixed relay

Holly Dixon (born 23 December 1997) is a British middle-distance and cross country runner.

== Biography ==
A member of the Cambridge Harriers, she set a course record to win the Folkestone Coastal 10k race in Kent in 2020. In October 2021, she set a course record to win the Worthing 10k in Sussex.

Dixon lowered her 5 km road personal best to 15:51 whilst representing England at the Home Nations race in Cardiff in August 2024, where she finished in first place. In September 2024, she was runner-up to Niamh Brown in the English National Cross Country Championships race in Telford. She finished runner-up in the short course race at the Liverpool Cross Challenge in November 2024.

In December 2024, she was the top female finisher in the Mizuno Mile at the Battersea New Years Eve 5k in London. In January 2025, she finished in sixth place at the Cross Internacional Juan Muguerza in Elgoibar, Spain.

She qualified for the final of the 1500 metres at the 2025 British Indoor Athletics Championships in Birmingham, placing sixth overall. She competed for England at the Loughborough International in May 2025. That month, she ran a personal best for the mile run of 4:40.05 to win the Bannister Mile in Oxford. She ran a 4:12.36 personal best for the 1500 metres at the British Milers Grand Prix in June 2025, finishing runner-up to Emily Parker. On 2 August, she qualified for the final of the 1500 metres at the 2025 UK Athletics Championships in Birmingham, placing eighth overall. Later that month, she won the women’s 1500m A race at the BMC Trafford Grand Prix in a new personal best of 4:10.56.

In September 2025, Dixon won the Westminster Mile in London in 4:30. Dixon won the women's mile at the Cardiff Cross Challenge on 8 November 2025, finishing ahead of Ava Lloyd to gain automatic selection for the British team for the mixed relay at the European Cross Country Championships. At the championships, on 14 December 2025 in Lagoa, Portugal, Dixon won the bronze medal in the event alongside Jack Higgins, Callum Elson and Ava Lloyd.

Dixon opened her 2026 indoor season with an indoor personal best over 1500 metres in Sheffield, running 4:10.65 to finish runner-up to Molly Hudson. She was a finalist over 1500 metres at the 2026 British Indoor Athletics Championships in Birmingham, placing fifth overall. In May, Dixon ran a personal best 4:08.95 finishing runner-up to Phoebe Gill over 1500 metres at the British Milers' Club Trafford Grand Prix in Manchester. In June, she reached the final of the 1500 metres at the 2026 UK Championships.
