= Carmen Cernjul =

Swedish middle-distance runner (born 2007)

Personal information
- Born: 14 June 2007 (age 19)

Sport
- Sport: Athletics
- Events: Long-distance running, Middle-distance running
Medal record
Women's athletics
Representing Sweden
European U20 Championships
Silver medal – second place	2025 Tampere	1500 m
Silver medal – second place	2025 Tampere	3000 m
European U18 Championships
Bronze medal – third place	2024 Banská Bystrica	800 m
European Cross Country Championships
Bronze medal – third place	2025 Lagoa	U20 team

Carmen Cernjul (born 14 June 2007) is a Swedish middle-distance and long-distance runner.

== Biography ==
Cernjul was a footballer in the academy at Hammarby Fotboll and was selected for the Swedish under-18 national women's football team, before opting to focus on athletics. She is a member of Spårvägens GoIF.

Cernjul made her international championship debut at the 2023 European Youth Olympic Festival in Maribor, Slovenia, where she entered the 800m but failed to advance from the heats.

Cernjul won her semi-final heat before winning a bronze medal in the final over 800 metres at the 2024 European Athletics U18 Championships in Banská Bystrica, Slovakia.

Cernjul set a Swedish under-20 junior record indoors over 3000 metres running 9:08.42 in January 2025. Later that year, Cernjul set a new Swedish junior record in the 5000 metres with a time of 15:38.86. In June, Cernjul improved her personal best in the 1500 metres in Jessheim, Norway, finishing in 4:11.61. She later lowered that personal best to 4:10.64 that summer.

Cernjul won a silver medal over 1500 metres at the 2025 European Athletics U20 Championships in Tampere, Finland, finishing behind Lyla Belshaw of Great Britain, running 4:15.00. At the same championships, she also won a silver medal in the 3000 metres behind Innes FitzGerald of Great Britain.

Cernjul had a fourth place finish in the under-20 women's race at the 2025 European Cross Country Championships in Portugal, won the bronze medal in the team event alongside Fanny Szalkai and Anastasia Nilsson.

Cernjul placed second to Yolanda Ngarambe over both 1500 metres and 3000 metres at the senior 2026 Swedish Indoor Championships in Stockholm. In May, Cernjul won the 3000m in 8:56.98 ahead of Belgians Lisa Rooms and Elise Vanderelst at The Belfast Classic. In July, she ran a new Swedish under-20 record for the 1500 m with 4:07.08 at the Folksam Grand Prix in Karlstad, Sweden. She placed fifth over 5000 metres at the 2026 World Athletics U20 Championships. In August, she competed at the 2026 European Athletics Championships in Birmingham, England, in the 1500 metres.
