= Saïd Mechaal =

Spanish athlete (born 1998)

Personal information
- Full name: Saïd Mechaal Mechaal
- Nationality: Spanish
- Born: 23 May 1998 (age 27) Palamós, Spain

Sport
- Country: Spain
- Sport: Athletics
- Event(s): Long-distance running, cross country running

Saïd Mechaal Mechaal (born 23 May 1998) is a Spanish long-distance and cross country runner. In January 2026, he set a new Spanish national record in the 10K run, whilst competing in Valencia.

== Career ==
He is a member of ADA Calvià-Vistasol in Mallorca. He studied in the United States at Iowa State University. He placed ninth overall competing for Iowa State over 5000 metres at the 2024 NCAA Indoor Championships, and placed tenth overall at the 2024 NCAA cross country championships.

In October 2025, Mechaal competed at the Paris 20K, breaking the Spanish national record previously held by Thierry Ndikumwenayo for 15km during the race, with his 15-kilometre split time, and finished 2 seconds outside the Spanish 20km record held by Carlos Mayo. Later that month, he made his debut in the half marathon in Valencia, running 60:48.

Mechaal placed fifth Spaniard at the Cross Internacional de Atapuerca in November 2025, and made his senior international debut competing at the 2025 European Cross Country Championships in Lagoa, Portugal, having previously ran at a junior level at the championships for Spain in 2019.

On 11 January 2026, Mechaal broke the Spanish 10K run national record in Valencia by 16 seconds, finishing seventh overall in the race in 27:25 minutes, to beat the mark previously set by Ilias Fifa.

== Personal life ==
Born in Palamós, Catalonia, his brother is fellow Spanish international runner Adel Mechaal. He is of Moroccan descent, with his family moving from Morocco to Baix Empordà in Catalonia prior to his birth.
