= Pia Schlattmann =

German athlete (born 2004)

Personal information
- Born: 22 September 2004 (age 22)

Sport
- Sport: Athletics
- Event: Long distance running
Medal record
Women's athletics
Representing Germany
European Cross Country Championships
Silver medal – second place	2025 Lagoa	U23 team
Bronze medal – third place	2025 Lagoa	U23 race
Bronze medal – third place	2024 Antalya	U23 team

Pia Schlattmann (born 22 September 2004) is a German cross country and long-distance runner.

== Biogrpahy ==
A member of German athletics club LG Brillux in Münster, Schlattmann placed fourth overall in her international debut in a Germany vest, at the age of 20 years-of-age, in the women’s under-23 race at the 2024 European Cross Country Championships in Antalya, Turkey, leading the German team to a bronze medal in the team competition alongside Blanka Dörfel who placed tenth, with Mia Jurenka in 26th.

At the German 10,000 metres Championships in Hamburg in May 2025, she finished third in the U23 competition and fifth overall. Schlattmann placed fifth over 5000 metres at the 2025 European Athletics U23 Championships in Bergen, Norway.

Selected for the German team for the 2025 Summer World University Games, held in Germany, she had another fifth place finish over 5000 metres.

She placed third at the senior women's race at the 2025 German Cross Country Championships. She was selected to run for Germany in the under-23 race at the 2025 European Cross Country Championships in Portugal, winning the bronze medal in a battle with her compatriot Lisa Merkel, and silver in the team competition alongside Merkel and Kira Weis.

On 14 November 2026, she placed fifth at the Sparkassen Cross Pforzheim in Germany, a Gold meeting on the 2026-27 World Athletics Cross Country Tour.
