= Michael Clark (runner) =

British runner

Personal information
- Nationality: British
- Born: 15 July 2008 (age 18) Japan

Sport
- Sport: Athletics
- Events: Long-distance running, Cross Country running
- Club: City of Norwich Athletics Club

Achievements and titles
- Personal bests: 3000m: 7:59.22 (Loughborough, 2026); 5000m: 14:08.97 (London, 2025)
Medal record
Men's athletics
Representing Great Britain
European Cross Country Championships
Silver medal – second place	2025 Lagoa	U20 team

Michael Clark (born 15 July 2008) is a British long-distance and cross country runner. He was a silver medalist in the team under-20 event at the 2025 European Cross Country Championships.

== Early life ==
Clark was born in Japan and also lived in Hong Kong during his childhood. He has an English mother and Australian father. Both his father and mother are keen equestrians. He has a sister. Clark initially took part in triathlon before later focusing on athletics. After moving to Norfolk in England, where his mother has roots, Clark attended at Wymondham College.

== Career ==
Clark is a member of the City of Norwich Athletics Club in Norwich, where he is coached by Jane Clarke. In March 2024, he placed sixth in the senior boys English Schools Cross Country Championships in Pontefract. In September 2024, he won the under-17 race at the English National Cross Country Championships. As a 16 year-old, Clark ran 14:08.97 for the 5000 metres in London in May 2025 to move into the top-six in the world under-18 list for the year. The following month, he ran a personal best 8:09.43 over 3000 metres at the British Milers Club Grand Prix in Loughborough on 21 June 2025.

Clark won the men’s under-20 race at the Liverpool Cross Challenge in November 2025. He was subsequently selected for the 2025 European Cross Country Championships in Lagoa, Portugal on 14 December 2025. Competing as a 17 year-old, he placed eighteenth in the individual under-20 race, where he ran despite losing a shoe in the first 100 metres after being clipped by another runner, and completed the rest of the 5 km course with only one shoe. His time of 13:39 was the second-fastest 5 km (3.1-mile) time in Europe in 2025 for an under-18 athlete. The time also placed him in the top-12 worldwide for the agegroup in the year. There was initial confusion over the result because his timing chip for the race was in the shoe he lost, with the British team initially credited with fourth place and out of the medals, before the issue was rectified and his performance in fact helped the British team to win the U20 team silver medal as the third British scorer behind William Rabjohns and Alex Lennon.

In January 2026, Clark ran a 15:01 Parkrun on New Years Day before winning the U20 race at the Norfolk Cross Country Championships by over three minutes. Clark was the first finisher for the British team in the under-20 race at the 2026 World Athletics Cross Country Championships in Tallahassee, Florida on 10 January 2026, placing twentieth overall. That month he was selected to run for England at the Lotto Cross Cup de Hannut in Belgium. In June, he ran under eight minutes for the first time over 3000 metres with 7:59.22 in Loughborough. In July, Clark won the 3000 metres title at the 2026 England Athletics U20 Championships. On 7 August 2026, he had a 13th place finish in the 3000 metres at the 2026 World Athletics U20 Championships in Eugene, USA.

== Personal life ==
Clark's paternal great uncle, Al Lawrence, won a bronze medal for Australia in the 10,000 metres at the 1956 Olympic Games in Melbourne, and was world record holder over two miles and three miles indoors.
