= Willem Renders =

Belgian athlete (born 2007)

Personal information
- Born: 7 February 2007 (age 19)

Sport
- Sport: Athletics
- Event: Long-distance running

Achievements and titles
- Personal bests: 1500m: 3:50.77 (Brussels, 2025); 3000m: 7:47.02 (Leuven, 2025); 5000m: 13:31.12 NU20R (Oslo, 2025)
Medal record
Men's athletics
Representing BEL
European U20 Championships
Gold medal – first place	2025 Tampere	5000 m
European Cross Country Championships
Gold medal – first place	2025 Lagoa	U20 race
Gold medal – first place	2025 Lagoa	U20 team

Willem Renders (born 7 February 2007) is a Belgian long-distance and cross country runner. He was the European U20 Champion over 5000 metres in 2025. He won individual and team gold in the U20 race at the 2025 European Cross Country Championships and represented Belgium at the 2026 World Athletics Cross Country Championships.

== Biography ==
From West Flanders, Renders started running in De Haan and later trained as a member of AV Jabbeke before joining Excelsior in Brussels.

Renders set a 5000 metres personal best of 13:55.09 in May 2025 at the King Baudouin Stadium in Brussels. He won the gold medal over 5000 metres at the 2025 European Athletics U20 Championships in Tampere, Finland, finishing ahead of Sweden's Karl Ottfalk in August 2025. Later that month, he set a new national under-20 record over that distance, running 13:31.12 in Oslo, Norway, breaking the previous best by Jean-Pierre Ndayisengha which had stood since 1981.

Renders suffered a broken elbow from a fall in the second half of 2025. Despite that, he recovered to win the men's under-20 race at the Belgian Cross Country Championships in November 2025. Renders subsequently won the gold medal for Belgium in the men's under-20 race at the 2025 European Cross Country Championships in Portugal, also leading Belgium to the team gold. He become the first Belgian winner since Jeroen D'hoedt in 2009.

Competing in the men's U20 race at the 2026 World Athletics Cross Country Championships in Tallahassee, Florida, he was the leading European finisher in 11th place, the highest finish by a European in the race since 1994. In August, Renders placed fourth overall in the 5000 metres race at the 2026 World Athletics U20 Championships in Eugene, United States.

== Personal life ==
Renders is a bioengineering student at the University of Ghent. He is a training partner of fellow Belgian under-20 record holder Elliot Vermeulen.
