= Lisa Merkel =

German long-distance runner

Personal information
- Born: 20 January 2003 (age 23)

Sport
- Sport: Athletics
- Events: Long-distance running, Cross Country running

Achievements and titles
- Personal bests: 3000m: 8:58.63 (Pliezhausen, 2025); 5000m: 15:21.00 (Karlsruhe, 2024); 10000m: 31:32.25 (San Juan Capistrano, 2026)
Medal record
Women's athletics
Representing Germany
European Cross Country Championships
Silver medal – second place	2025 Lagoa	U23 team
Silver medal – second place	2023 Brussels	U23 team

Lisa Merkel (born 20 January 2003) is a German cross country and long-distance runner.

== Biography ==
A member of LG Region Karlsruhe, Merkel set the fastest time at the Olympiaberg cross-country race in Munich in 2023, winning the under-23 race, but faster than the winner of the women's race. Merkel placed seventh at the 2023 European Athletics U23 Championships in Espoo. Finland, over 5000 metres. She was the highest German finisher as the team won the silver medal in the team under-23 race at the 2023 European Cross Country Championships in Brussels, alongside Mia Jurenka, Jessica Keller, and Anneke Vortmeier.

By 2024, a member of LAV Stadtwerke Tübingen, Merkel made her major championship debut representing Germany and placed ninth at the 2024 European Athletics Championships in Rome, Italy in June 2024, in the women's 10,000 metres race. The following month, she won the German U23 title over 5000 metres in Monchengladbach.

Merkel competed for Germany in the 10 km at the 2025 European Running Championships in Belgium, placing seventeenth overall. At the German 10,000 metres Championships in Hamburg in May 2025, she finished third overall and was the leading runner in the U23 category.

Merkel placed fourth at the German Cross Country Championships in Darmstadt in November 2025. She was subsequently selected for the under-23 race at the 2025 European Cross Country Championships in Portugal, placing fourth in the individual race and winning the silver medal in the team competition alongside Kira Weis and Pia Schlattmann.

In March 2026, she ran a 10,000 metres personal best of 31:32.25 at The Ten in San Juan Capistrano. In August, she competed at the 2026 European Athletics Championships in Birmingham, England, placing ninth in the 10,000 metres.
