= Anas Lagtiy Chaoudar =

French athlete (born 2004)

Personal information
- Nationality: French
- Born: 17 January 2004 (age 22) Spain
- Height: 181 cm (5 ft 11 in)
- Weight: 65 kg (143 lb)

Sport
- Country: France
- Sport: Athletics
- Events: Middle-distance running; Cross country running
Medal record
Men's athletics
Representing France
European Cross Country Championships
Silver medal – second place	2025 Lagoa	U23 team

Anas Lagtiy Chaoudar (born 17 January 2004) is a middle-distance and cross country runner. Born in Spain, he represents France at international level having become a naturalised citizen in 2024. He is the French U23 record holder over 1500 metres, both outdoors and indoors, and was a silver medalist in the U23 team race at the 2025 European Cross Country Championships.

== Biography ==
Chaoudar was born in Spain to Moroccan parents on January 17, 2004. Based in Strasbourg, he is a member of ASPTT Strasbourg and coached by Jean-Marc Ducret. On 16 March 2024 he was officially naturalised as a French citizen. In July 2024, Chaoudar finished as runner-up to Paul Anselmini in the 1500 metres race at the French Athletics U23 Championships in Albi.

In his first Diamond League meeting at the 2025 Golden Gala in Rome, he improved his personal best to 3:31.58 for 1500 metres to break the long-standing French under-23 1500m record, held for a quarter of a century by Mehdi Baala. In June 2025, Chaoudar competed for France over 1500 metres at the 2025 European Athletics Team Championships First Division in Madrid, placing eighth overall. The following month, he placed fourth over 1500 metres at the 2025 European Athletics U23 Championships in Bergen, Norway.

Chaoudar won the silver medal in the team competition representing France in the U23 race at the 2025 European Cross Country Championships in Lagoa, Portugal alongside Aurélien Radja and Pierre Boudy.

In January 2026, he set a new French under-23 record in the 1500 metres indoors whilst winning the Elite Indoor Miramas Meeting, a World Athletics Indoor Tour silver meeting in Miramas, France, running a time of 3:36.64 to surpass the record set the previous year by Paul Anselmini by eight hundredths of a second, and winning the race ahead of Samuel Chapple of the Netherlands. He placed sixth over 1500 metres on 28 June at the 2026 Meeting de Paris. In July, he won the 1500m in 3:31.40 at the Meeting Stanislas Nancy in France.
