= Anaëlle Guillonnet =

French athlete (born 2000)

Personal information
- Born: 19 September 2000 (age 26) Longjumeau, France
- Height: 172 cm (5 ft 8 in)
- Weight: 59 kg (130 lb)

Sport
- Country: France
- Sport: Athletics
- Events: Long distance running; Cross country running

Achievements and titles
- Personal bests: 1500m: 4:17.34 (Carquefou, 2025); 3000m: 9:15.83 (Metz, 2025); 5000m: 15:54.88 (Brussels, 2025)
Medal record
Women's athletics
Representing France
European Cross Country Championships
Bronze medal – third place	2025 Lagoa	Team

Anaëlle Guillonnet (born 19 September 2000) is a French middle-, long-distance and cross country runner. She was a bronze medalist in the team event at the 2025 European Cross Country Championships and won the 5000 metres title at the 2026 French Athletics Championships.

== Biography ==
Guillonnet is a member of Décines Meyzieu Athlétisme (DMA) in Lyon. She represented France at the European Cross Country Championships as a junior. Although initially competing in middle-distance running, alongside her coach Bastien Perraux, she transitioned from a middle-distance runner into longer distances after analysing her performances. In November 2024, Guillonet set a new course record and a personal best over 10 km, winning in 33:22 in Vénissieux.

In November 2025, Guillonnet placed fourth at the Allones International Cross Country race to gain selection for her senior debut at the European Championships. Guillonnet subsequently placed twelfth in the women's race at the 2025 European Cross Country Championships in Lagoa, Portugal, the second French finisher behind Agathe Guillemot and with Alessia Zarbo, helped France to team bronze, their first medal in the senior women's race at the Championships since 2015.

On 4 January 2026, she placed third behind Zarbo and Jana Van Lent in 31:39 at the Prom Classic 10 km in Nice, France. On 25 July 2026, she won the 5000 metres title at the 2026 French Championships.

== Personal life ==
Her older brother Adrien is a trail runner.
