= Kira Weis =

German long-distance runner

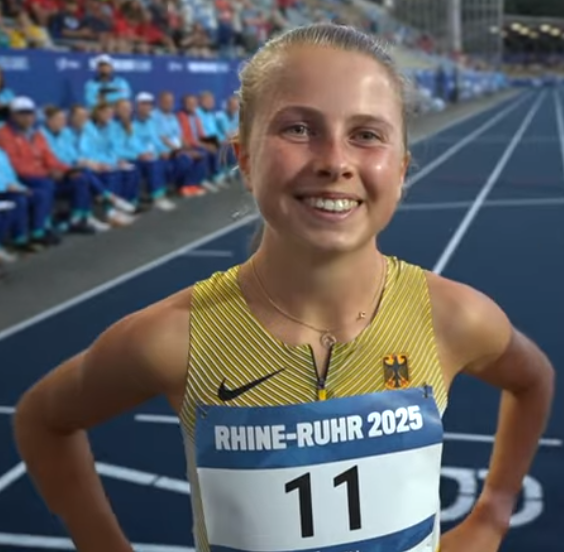
- At the 2025 Summer World University Games

Personal information
- Born: 16 March 2004 (age 22)

Sport
- Sport: Athletics
- Event(s): Long distance running, Cross country running

Achievements and titles
- Personal best(s): 3000m: 9:06.79 (Rostock, 2023); 5000m: 15:42.94 (Ulm, 2025); 10,000m: 32:36.62 (Bergen, 2025)
Medal record
Women's athletics
Representing Germany
European U23 Championships
Silver medal – second place	2023 Jerusalem	5000 m
Silver medal – second place	2025 Bergen	10,000 m
European Cross Country Championships
Silver medal – second place	2025 Lagoa	U23 team
Silver medal – second place	2023 Brussels	U20 team

Kira Weis (born 16 March 2004) is a German long-distance and cross country runner.

== Career ==
Weis made her international debut for Germany over 5000 metres at the 2022 World Athletics U20 Championships in Cali, Colombia, placing 10th overall in 16:57. She won the German U20 cross country title in November 2022 and finished sixth in the U20 individual race at the 2022 European Cross Country Championships in Turin, Italy.

She won the silver medal at the 2023 European Athletics U20 Championships over 5000 metres in Jerusalem, Israel, running a personal best 15:50.36 to finish behind Agate Caune of Latvia and ahead of Sofia Thøgersen of Denmark. In October 2023, in Lucerne, Switzerland she ran a 10 km road personal best of 32:31 minutes. She finished fourth in the individual U20 race and won the silver medal in the team U20 event at the 2023 European Cross Country Championships in Brussels. At the Sandharlanden Silvesterlauf, Weis ran 10 km in 32:19 min to break the German U20 record of 32:24 min, previously held by Konstanze Klosterhalfen. Later that year, Weis was named Germany's young female runner of the year.

In May 2024, she finished fifth in 33:06.40 at the senior German 10,000 metres championships in Wassenberg. She won the silver medal over 10,000 metres at the 2025 European Athletics U23 Championships in Bergen, Norway on 18 July 2025 behind Irishwoman Anika Thompson, running a personal best time of 32:36.62 and finishing ahead of German compatriots Carolina Schäfer, who won bronze, and fourth-placed Nele Heymann. Later that year, she placed fourth at the U23 German Cross Country Championships in Darmstadt in November 2025. She was subsequently selected for the U23 race at the 2025 European Cross Country Championships in Portugal, where she won the silver medal in the team competition alongside Lisa Merkel and Pia Schlattmann.

Weis starts for the KSG Leichtathletik (Sprint&Lauf), a subdivision of KSG Gerlingen.
