= Jack Higgins (runner) =

British athlete (born 2001)

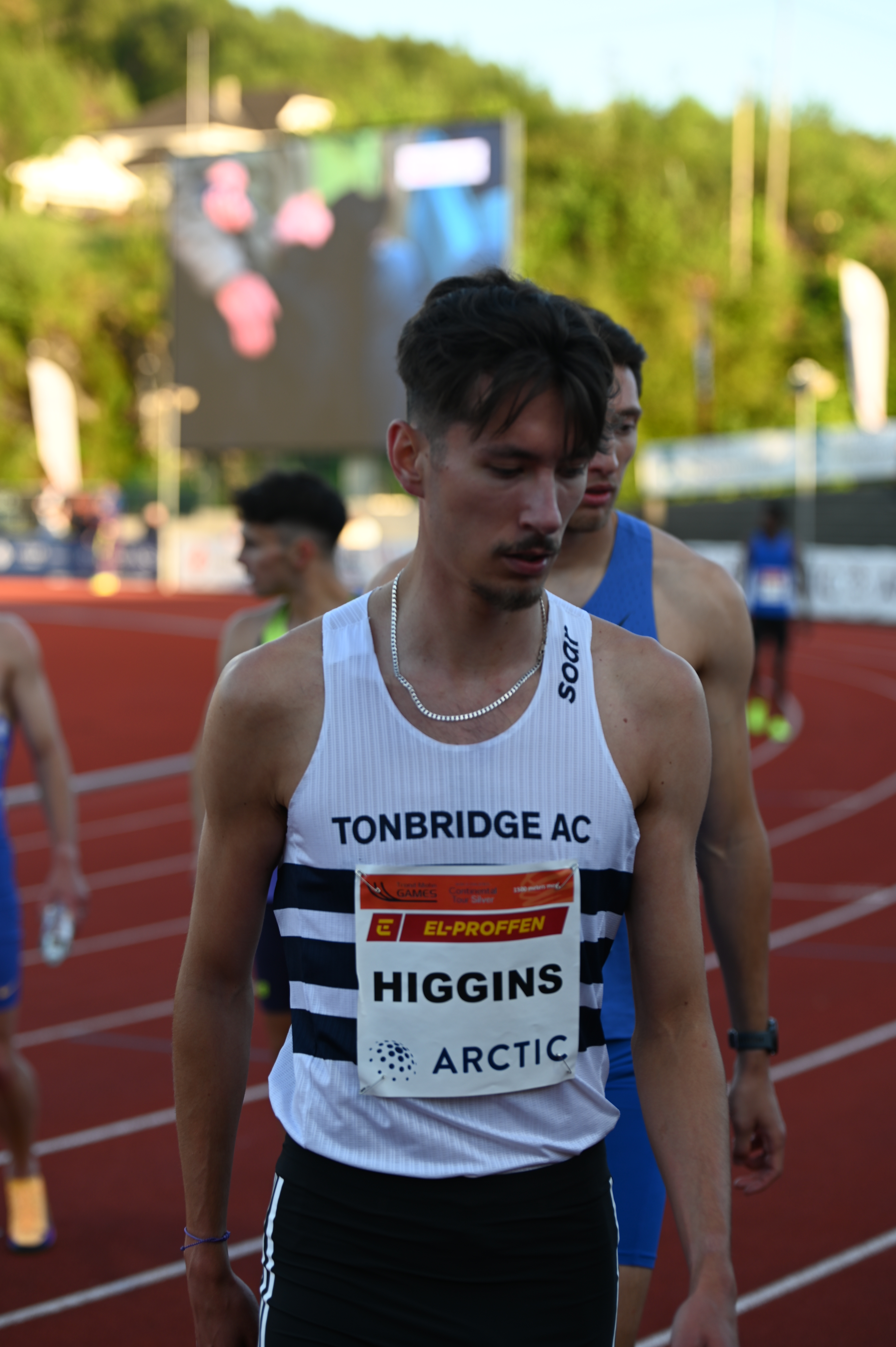
- Higgins in 2026

Personal information
- Nationality: British
- Born: 20 September 2001 (age 24)

Sport
- Sport: Athletics
- Events: Middle distance running, Cross country running

Achievements and titles
- Personal bests: 800m: 1:44.81 (Poznań, 2026); 1500m: 3:39.55 (Birmingham, 2025); Indoors; 800m: 1:46.69 (Birmingham, 2025); Mile: 4:05.10 (London, 2024)
Medal record
Men's athletics
Representing Great Britain
European Cross Country Championships
| Bronze medal – third place | 2025 Lagoa | Mixed relay |

Jack Higgins (born 20 September 2001) is a British middle-distance and cross country runner. He has been British Indoor champion over 800 metres and 1500 metres. He represented Great Britain at the 2025 European Indoor Championships and 2026 World Indoor Championships.

== Biography ==
Higgins runs for Tonbridge athletics club. He was the winner of the British 800 metres indoor title in February 2024 with a personal best time of 1:47.91, causing an upset against pre-race favourite Guy Learmonth at the 2024 British Indoor Athletics Championships. However, Higgins' world ranking was not sufficiently high enough to compete at the subsequent World Indoor Championships in Glasgow.

Higgins ran an indoor 800 metres personal best of 1:46.69 at the Keeley Klassic in Birmingham in February 2025. Later that month, Higgins finished second behind Justin Davies whilst competing over 800 metres at the 2025 British Indoor Athletics Championships in Birmingham, on 23 February 2025, in 1:48.02. He was subsequently selected for the British team for the 2025 European Athletics Indoor Championships in March 2025. At the championships in Apeldoorn, Netherlands, he ran 1:48.12 in his heat without qualifying for the 800 metres semi-finals.

Higgins won the men's mile at the Cardiff Cross Challenge on 8 November 2025, finishing ahead of Callum Elson to gain automatic selection for the British team for the mixed relay at the 2025 European Cross Country Championships in December 2025 in Portugal. At the championships, he won the bronze medal alongside Elson, Ava Lloyd and Holly Dixon.

Higgins ran 3:56.89 for the indoor mile at Lee Valley in February 2026. That month, he won the 1500 metres in a championship record 3:38.12 at the 2026 British Indoor Athletics Championships, on the same day as his brother Ted won bronze in the 3000 metres. On 1 March in Glasgow, he ran under the World Indoors qualifying standard in the men's 1500m with 3:35.60. He was named in the British team for the 1500 metres at the 2026 World Athletics Indoor Championships in Toruń, Poland, and placed seventh in his heat, recording a time of 3:44.75 on 20 March. In June, he qualified for the final of the 800 metres at the 2026 British Championships, placing fifth overall. Competing at the Czesław Cybulski Memorial in Poznań in June 2026, he ran a personal best of 1:44.81 for the 800 metres to finish third behind Australian Daniel Williams and Giovanni Lazzaro of Italy.

== Personal life ==
His brother Ted Higgins is also a middle-distance runner who runs for Tonbridge athletics club.
