= Julia David-Smith =

French long-distance runner (born 2003)

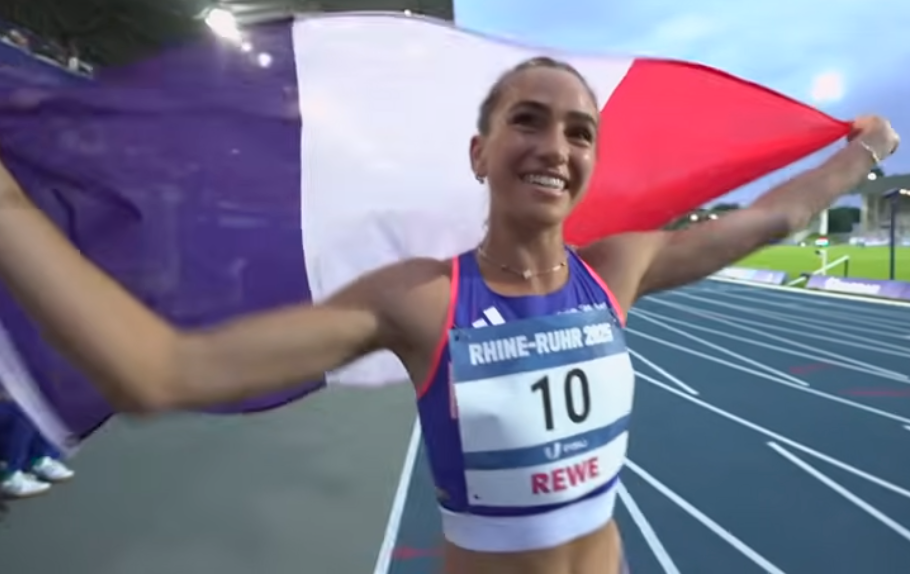
- David-Smith at the 2025 Summer World University Games

Personal information
- Nationality: French
- Born: 24 January 2003 (age 23) Bellevue, Washington, U.S.
- Height: 165 cm (5 ft 5 in)
- Weight: 50 kg (110 lb)

Sport
- Country: France
- Sport: Athletics
- Events: Middle-distance running, Cross country running

Achievements and titles
- Personal bests: 800m: 2:08.88 (2025); 1500m: 4:10.03 (2025); Mile: 4:36.66 (2025); 3000m: 8:59.06 (2024); 5000m: 15:34.57 (2025)
Medal record
Women's athletics
Representing France
Summer World University Games
Gold medal – first place	2025 Bochum	5000 m
European Cross Country Championships
Gold medal – first place	2025 Lagoa	U23 team

Julia David-Smith (born 24 January 2003) is a French middle- and long-distance runner. She won the gold medal over 5000 metres at the 2025 Summer World University Games. That year, she was a gold medalist in the under-23 team event at the 2025 European Cross Country Championships.

== Early and personal life ==
She was born to a French mother, from Couëron, and American father. She studied in the United States at Issaquah High School where she was a Washington State junior cross country champion, and later at the University of Washington.

== Career ==
She is a member of Nantes Métropole Athlétisme. She set personal best times over 800m, 1,500m, mile, 3,000m, 5,000m in 2025. She placed seventh the women's 5,000m, running a time of 15:39.97, in Carquefou in June 2025 on the World Athletics Challenger Continental Tour.

She finished in fourth place for the 5000 metres at the 2025 European Athletics U23 Championships in Bergen, Norway. The following week she won the gold medal at the 2025 Summer World University Games in Germany in the 5000 metres, with a personal best of 15:34.57.

Competing in the under-23 race at the 2025 European Cross Country Championships in Portugal, she won the gold medal in the team competition, placing fifth overall individually, leading home three French woman in the top ten with Camille Place and Nélie Clément.

In May 2026, David-Smith placed second in the 5000 metres at the Big Ten Outdoor Championships competing for Washington. Later that month, she qualified for the 2026 NCAA Outdoor Championships.
