= Oscar Gaitan =

Spanish athlete (born 2006)

Personal information
- Born: Oscar Gaitan Mordillo; 20 January 2006 (age 20)

Sport
- Sport: Athletics
- Events: Long-distance running, Cross Country running
Medal record
Men's athletics
Representing ESP
European Cross Country Championships
Silver medal – second place	2025 Lagoa	U20 race
Bronze medal – third place	2025 Lagoa	U20 team

Oscar Gaitan Mordillo (born 20 January 2006) is a Spanish long-distance and cross country runner.

== Career ==
From Plasencia, competing in Duathlon, he was the Extremadura champion in the children's and cadet categories. A member of the Plasemcua Athletics School and coached by Toño Sánchez, Gaitan Mordillo was runner-up over 3000 metres in the Spanish Indoor Under-16 Championships in March 2021 in Oviedo, in his first indoor race at the age of 15 years-old.

In May 2023, Gaitan won the 2023 World Mountain Running Association U18 World Mountain Running Cup.

In January 2025, Gaitan became the Spanish Under-20 Cross Country Champion. In May 2025, Gaitan won the Spanish U20 5000 metres title, breaking the championship record with a time of 14:07.96. In July 2025, Gaitan won the 3000 metres at the Spanish U20 Championships in Villafranca de los Barros. The following month, he placed fourth over 5000 metres at the 2025 European Athletics U20 Championships in Tampere, Finland.

Gaitan won individual silver and team bronze at the 2025 European Cross Country Championships in Lagoa, Portugal, on 14 December 2025.

== Personal life ==
Gaitan took part in many sports such as football, taekwondo, cycling, before focusing at the age of 13 years-old on athletics. As a teenager, Gaitán was the bone marrow transplant donor for his twin brother, Carlos, who was diagnosed with aplastic anemia.
