= Aurélien Radja =

French athlete (born 2004)

Personal information
- Born: 31 March 2004 (age 22) Dourdan, France
- Height: 176 cm (5 ft 9 in)
- Weight: 66 kg (146 lb)

Sport
- Country: France
- Sport: Athletics
- Events: Long-distance running Cross country running
- Club: Stade Sottevillais 76
- Coached by: Kader Chékhémani
Medal record
Men's athletics
Representing France
European Cross Country Championships
Silver medal – second place	2025 Lagoa	U23 race
Silver medal – second place	2025 Lagoa	U23 team

Aurélien Radja (born 31 March 2004) is a French long-distance and cross country runner.

== Career ==
From Sotteville, Normandy, Radja placed sixth in the French Short Course Cross Country Championships in March 2024, also finishing first in the U23 category. That month, he also placed second over 1500 metres at the French under-23 indoor athletics championships.

He had a fifteenth place finish in the men's under-23 race at the 2024 European Cross Country Championships in Antalya, Turkey as the French under-23 men's team won the silver medal in the team competition.

Radja had a top-ten finish over 5000 metres in 13.52.59 at the 2025 European Athletics U23 Championships in Bergen, Norway. He was a silver medalist behind Nick Griggs in the under-23 race the 2025 European Cross Country Championships in Lagoa, Portugal. The France team of Radja, Pierre Boudy, and Anas Chaoudar also won the silver medal in the team event at the championships.
