= Pierre Boudy =

French athlete (born 2004)

Personal information
- Born: 9 August 2004 (age 22) Périgueux, France
- Height: 180 cm (5 ft 11 in)
- Weight: 68 kg (150 lb)

Sport
- Country: France
- Sport: Athletics
- Events: Long-distance running; Cross country running; Steeplechase
Medal record
Men's athletics
Representing France
European U20 Championships
Silver medal – second place	2023 Jerusalem	3000m steeplechase
European Cross Country Championships
Silver medal – second place	2025 Lagoa	U23 team
Silver medal – second place	2024 Antalya	U23 team
Bronze medal – third place	2025 Lagoa	U23 race

Pierre Boudy (born 9 August 2004) is a French steeplechaser and cross country runner.

== Biography ==
Boudy was educated at the INSA Centre Val de Loire. Boudy competed in Thailand at the 2021 World Mountain and Trail Running Championships winning a silver medal with the French junior team.

Boudy won the silver medal in the 3000 metres steeplechase at the 2023 European Athletics U20 Championships in Jerusalem, Israel. He was runner-up to Luc Le Baron in the 3000 metres steeplechase at the 2024 French under-23 championships. He had a ninth place finish in the men's under-23 race at the 2024 European Cross Country Championships in Antalya, Turkey as his French team won the silver medal in the team competition.

He was a bronze medalist behind Nick Griggs and compatriot Aurélien Radja in the under-23 race the 2025 European Cross Country Championships in Lagoa, Portugal, after a battle for the medal position with Joel Ibler Lillesø of Denmark. The France team of Boudy, Anas Chaoudar and Radja also won the silver medal in the team event at the championships.

On 25 July 2026, Boudy placed second in the 3000 metres steeplechase at the senior 2026 French Championships. In August, he competed at the 2026 European Athletics Championships in Birmingham, England, in the 3000 metres steeplechase, placing fifth overall.
