= Megan Harris =

British long-distance runner

Personal information
- Born: 29 June 2004 (age 22)

Sport
- Sport: Athletics
- Event(s): Middle-distance running, Cross country running

Achievements and titles
- Personal best(s): 800m: 2:06.07 (2025); 1500m: 4:16.72 (2025); Mile: 5:00.57 (2024); 3000m: 9:40.19 (2022); 5000m: 17:09.51 (2025)

Megan Harris (born 29 June 2004) is a British middle-distance and cross country runner. She represented Great Britain in the junior races at the 2023 World Athletics Cross Country Championships and the 2025 European Cross Country Championships.

== Biography ==
From Leigh, Essex, Harris was born prematurely with a hole in her heart. She attended Blenheim Primary School and the University of Loughborough. She started running at the age of seven years-old and ran for Basildon and Chelmsford running clubs in Essex, and competed for Great Britain in the under-20 race at the 2023 World Athletics Cross Country Championships in Bathurst, Australia.

Harris was a finalist over 1500 metres at the 2025 British Athletics Championships. She won the under-23 race at the Liverpool Cross Challenge on 22 November 2025, finishing ahead of Emily Parker. She was subsequently selected as part of the British team for the under-23 race at the 2025 European Cross Country Championships. At the championships she was the second British finisher as the British team placed fifth overall. In January 2026, Harris was named by England Athletics for the Elgoibar Cross Country Juan Muguerza Memorial in Spain.
