= Fanny Szalkai =

Swedish long-distance runner (born 2008)

Personal information
- Born: 6 October 2008 (age 17)

Sport
- Sport: Athletics
- Event(s): Long distance running, Cross country running
Medal record
Women's athletics
Representing Sweden
European Cross Country Championships
Bronze medal – third place	2025 Lagoa	U20 team
European Youth Olympic Festival
Silver medal – second place	2025 Skopje	2000m st.

Fanny Szalkai (born 6 October 2008) is a Swedish middle- and long-distance and cross country runner. A bronze medalist in the U20 team event at the 2025 European Cross Country Championships, she was the highest European finisher in the U20 race at the 2026 World Athletics Cross Country Championships.

== Career ==
A member of Spårvägens GoIF, Szalkai won the silver medal in the 1000m at the indoor Swedish Youth Championships in Västerås in 2023. The following year, she won Swedish age-group titles at multiple distances including 800 metres, 1500 metres and 3000 metres, and the 2000 metres steeplechase.

She was a silver medalist in the steeplechase at the 2025 European Youth Summer Olympic Festival in Skopje, North Macedonia.

Competing at the 2025 European Cross Country Championships in Portugal in December 2025, she placed seventh overall in the women's under-20 race, winning the bronze medal in the team event alongside Carmen Cernjul and Anastasia Nilsson.

Competing in the women's U20 race at the 2026 World Athletics Cross Country Championships in Tallahassee, Florida, she was the leading European finisher in 21st place.
