= Matt Ramsden (British runner) =

British long-distance runner

Matthew Ramsden
- Ramsden in 2026

Personal information
- Born: 7 July 2003 (age 23)

Sport
- Sport: Athletics
- Events: Long distance running, Cross country running

Achievements and titles
- Personal bests: 800m: 1:52.56 (2024); 1500m: 3:46.23 (2025); 3000m: 8:04.65 (2024); 5000m: 13:48.11 (2024); 10,000m: 29:11.69 (2026); Road; 5km: 13:46 (2025); 10km: 29:05 (2025)

Matthew Ramsden (born 7 July 2003) is a British long-distance and cross country runner from Lancashire. He represented Great Britain at the 2025 European Cross Country Championships.

== Biography ==
A member of Blackburn Harriers Athletics Club in Lancashire, Ramsden placed second competing for England U20 at the Trofeo Opitergium in Italy in September 2022. In July 2024, Ramsden won the 5000 metres at the British National U23s Athletics Championships. In 2024, Ramsden ran inside 13:50 for 5 km on the road, dropping below 14 minutes three times in the year.

In February 2025, Ramsden was a member of the England team which won The Armagh International Road Race. He had a top-ten finish over 5000 metres at the 2025 UK Athletics Championships in Birmingham in August 2025. The following month, he finished fourth in the individual and second in the team event as he represented England at the Corsa dei Castelli point to point road race in Trieste, Italy.

Ramsden won the U23 race at the Liverpool Cross Challenge in November 2025. He was subsequently selected for the 2025 European Cross Country Championships in Lagoa, Portugal in December 2025, placing sixth overall in the under-23 race. That month, he was selected for his senior debut at the 2026 World Athletics Cross Country Championships in Tallahassee, in the United States, placing 53rd overall. In May, he won the B race representing Great Britain running a personal best 29:11.69 at the 2026 European 10,000m Cup in La Spezia, Italy. On 8 November, Ramsden won the Cardiff Cross Challenge, a silver race on the World Athletics Cross Country Tour. Despite taking a wrong turn on the final lap, he was able to catch-up with and overtake his last-lap companion, James Kingston, on the closing straight.

== Personal life ==
Ramsden was educated at St Bede's Roman Catholic High School, in Blackburn, Lancashire. Outside of athletics, Ramsden has worked as a finance assistant for Blackburn with Darwen Borough Council in Lancashire.
