= Idaira Prieto =

Spanish long-distance runner

Personal information
- Born: 17 September 1997 (age 29)

Sport
- Sport: Athletics
- Events: Long distance running, Cross country running

Idaira Prieto (born 17 August 1997) is a Spanish long-distance runner. She became Spanish champion over 10,000 metres in 2025.

== Biography ==
Prieto competed as a junior athlete for the Athletics Technical Specialization Center (CETA) and the CAS Ciudad de Segovia. She later ran for the Bilbao Santutxu Athletics Club, and in 2018 became the cross country running champion of Castilla y León, also winning the under-23 category at the race.

She won the Castilla y Leon cross country championship title in January 2024. She won the Urban Mile of Barco road race in September 2024. Later that year, she made her senior debut competing for Spain at the 2024 European Cross Country Championships in Antalya, Spain.

Prieto competed for Spain over 3000 metres at the 2025 European Athletics Indoor Championships in Apeldoorn, Netherlands. Prieto won the Spanish national title over 10,000 metres in May 2025, running a personal best time of 32:50.75. In September 2025, she competed over 5000 metres at the 2025 World Championships in Tokyo, Japan, without advancing to the final. On 16 November, she placed fourth at the Cross Internacional de Soria on the World Athletics Cross Country Tour. In December, she placed sevententh at the 2025 European Cross Country Championships in Lagoa, Portugal, in the senior women's race. On 10 January 2026, she placed 28th overall at the 2026 World Athletics Cross Country Championships.

In February 2026, she placed fifth at the Almond Blossom Cross Country race, in Albufeira, Portugal. In August, she competed at the 2026 European Championships in Birmingham, England, finishing in fourth place in the 10,000 metres in a personal best time of 31:59.84, and placing ninth in the 5000 metres. She was the leading European with sixth place at the 2026 Cross Internacional de Soria.

== Personal life ==
From Segovia, Prieto is the daughter of Spanish distance runner Antonio Prieto.
