= Camille Place =

French long-distance runner (born 2003)

Personal information
- Born: 13 July 2003 (age 23) Oyonnax, France
- Height: 170 cm (5 ft 7 in)
- Weight: 53 kg (117 lb)

Sport
- Country: France
- Sport: Athletics
- Events: Middle-distance running; Long-distance running; Cross country running
- Club: EA Saint-Quentin-en-Yvelines
- Coached by: Cedric Beaurain
Medal record
Women's athletics
Representing France
European Cross Country Championships
Gold medal – first place	2025 Lagoa	U23 team

Camille Place (born 13 July 2003) is French middle-, long-distance, and cross country runner. She became French champion over 5km in 2025. That year, she was a gold medalist in the under-23 team event at the 2025 European Cross Country Championships.

== Biography ==
From Bugey, Ain, Place trained at EA Bourg-en-Bresse. She placed second over 1500 metres at the French under-20 championships in Mulhouse in 2022.

Place won the French junior cross country title in March 2024, placing fifth overall including the senior racers. She also placed fifth in the under-23 race at the 2024 European Cross Country Championships in Antalya, Turkey.

Place became a member of EA Saint-Quentin-en-Yvelines, training with the Yvelines Performance Middle-Distance Team. Competing in Brussels, Place set a personal best in the 5000m in May 2026, running a time of 15:33.67.

In October 2025, Place won the French road running 5km title in Fréjus in a time of 16:03 in her first senior race. Place won the gold medal in the under-23 team event at the 2025 European Cross Country Championships in Portugal, placing seventh overall as the second French finisher behind Julia David-Smith.
