= Evan Grime =

British middle-distance runner

Personal information
- Nationality: British
- Born: 18 November 2008 (age 18) Oldham, England

Sport
- Sport: Athletics
- Event: Middle-distance running
- Club: Salford Harriers

Evan Grime (born 18 November 2008) is a British middle-distance runner.

== Early Life and Background ==
Evan Grime was born on November 18, 2008, in Royton, Oldham, United Kingdom. He comes from a family with a strong athletic background. His father, Ian Grime, is a former international runner who now coaches Evan, while his mother, Jill, has been a strong supporter of his career. His sister, Erin, also competes for Salford Harriers.

Grime began competing in athletics at the age of 7 and has since developed into one of the most promising young middle-distance runners in the world. He attends The Blue Coat School, Oldham and runs for Salford Harriers.

Evan's early success in running was evident when he won the Oldham Schools' Cross-Country League for two out of three years during his primary school years. He also competed successfully in track events, becoming the 2018 and 2019 Greater Manchester Under-11 schools' champion at 600 metres.

== Career ==
He is a member of the Salford Harriers. In 2022, he became England U15 champion for the 1500 metres, and in 2023 ran 3:54.36 for that distance to break the UK under-15 record for the first time, it was an 18 second personal best.

=== 2024 ===
On 26 August 2024, he ran a world mile best for the U15 age group, running 4:05.48 at the British Milers Club meet in Bury. In 2024, he set personal bests across multiple distances, including the 800 meters (1:49.69), 1500 meters (3:47.72) and 3000 meters (8:26.89). In July 2024, despite his young age, Grime represented Great Britain at the 2024 European Athletics U18 Championships, qualifying for the 1500m final and finishing seventh overall.

=== 2025 ===
In 2025, he set British under-17 records over 1500 metres and 3000 metres. He ran 1:52.13 for the 800m at the 2025 British Indoor Athletics Championships in Birmingham. In July 2025, he won the under-18 men’s 1500 metres at the English Schools Championships, and was runner-up over 1500 metres at the UK U20 Championships.
