= Emma Hickey =

Irish athlete (born 2009)

Personal information
- Nationality: Ireland
- Born: 1 March 2009 (age 17)

Sport
- Sport: Athletics
- Events: Middle distance,Cross country

Achievements and titles
- Personal bests: 1500m: 4:23.16 (Belfast, 2026); 3000m: 9:28.14 (Tullamore, 2025)
Medal record
Women's athletics
Representing Ireland
European U18 Championships
Silver medal – second place	2026 Rieti	1500m
European Cross Country Championships
Bronze medal – third place	2025 Lagoa	U20 race

Emma Hickey (born 1 March 2009) is an Irish middle- and long-distance and cross country runner. She was a medalist at the 2025 European Cross Country Championships and 2026 European Athletics U18 Championships.

== Biography ==
From County Wexford, Hickey attended St Mary's Secondary School, New Ross. She is a member of United Striders Athletic Club in New Ross.

In May 2025, Hickey ran 21-seconds below the Irish Intermediate Girls 3000 metres record to win the All-Ireland Schools Track and Field Championships. She was subsequently selected to represent Ireland at the 2025 European Youth Olympic Festival (EYOF) in Skopje, North Macedonia in July 2025, to compete over 3000 metres.

Hickey won the Irish under-20 National Cross Country Championships in 2025. She was selected to represent Ireland at the 2025 European Cross Country Championships in Portugal in December 2025, where she won a bronze medal in the under-20 race at the age of 16 years old. She placed fifth over 1500 metres at the senior Irish Indoor Athletics Championships. On 7 March 2026, Hickey won the All-Ireland Schools Cross Country Championships in Belfast. In May, Hickey won the senior girls' 3000m title in 9:31.75 at the Irish Schools Track and Field Championships. In July, she won the silver medal in the 1500 metres at the 2026 European Athletics U18 Championships in Rieti, Italy, running 4:24.90. On 22 November 2026, Hickey won the U20 title at the Irish Cross Country Championships.
