= Joe Wigfield =

British athlete (born 2000)

Personal information
- Nationality: British (English)
- Born: Joseph Wigfield; 18 January 2000 (age 26)

Sport
- Sport: Athletics
- Events: Middle-distance running, Cross country running
- Club: Wirral Athletics Club
- Coached by: Craig Winrow
Medal record
Men's Athletics
Representing Great Britain
European Cross Country Championships
Gold medal – first place	2022 Turin	U23 Team

Joseph Wigfield (born 18 January 2000) is a British middle distance long-distance and cross country runner. In 2026 he equalled the British national record in the 10k run and won the British national title on the track over 10,000 metres. He represented Great Britain at the 2023 World Athletics Cross Country Championships.

== Biography ==
A member of Wirral Athletics Club from the age of eleven years-old, Wigfield attended St Mary’s University, Twickenham from 2018 and is coached by former Olympian Craig Winrow in Teddington, where he remained after graduating in Health and Exercise Science.

Wigfield compèted for Great Britain at the 2019 European Athletics U20 Championships in Borås, Sweden over 3000 metres, and in the under-23 race at the 2022 European Cross Country Championships in Turin, Italy, placing thirteenth overall as the British U23 team won the gold medal.

Wigfield was selected to represent Great Britain at the 2023 World Athletics Cross Country Championships in Bathurst, Australia in the mixed relay, running the first leg as the British team placed sixth overall on his international debut, competing alongside Callum Elson, Alex Bell and Alexandra Millard.

In September 2024, Wigfield became the first man to run the Westminster Mile course in London in under four minutes, winning in a new course record of 3:58.

In May 2025, he ran 3.56.64 to win the Bannister Mile in Oxford. Wigfield ran a 3:56.46 personal best for the mile later that summer in Dublin. In September, he won the Westminster Mile in London in 3:59.77. In October 2025, Wigfield ran a course record 1:02:02 to win the elite men’s race at the Manchester Half Marathon, in his second race over the distance. He won the Battersea 5k race on the roads on 31 December, running a personal best 13:37 to finish ahead of Jack Higgins and Sebastiano Parolini.

On 11 January 2026, he equalled the British national record of Rory Leonard in the 10k run, whilst racing in Valencia, Spain, running 27:38 in just his second official 10k race. On 15 March, he won the official British Athletics trial race for the half marathon at the 2026 World Athletics Road Running Championships, held at the Bath Half Marathon in 62:07, ending out Phil Sesemann and Alfie Manthorpe in a sprint finish. He won the British national 10,000 metres title in Loughborough on 17 May 2026 with a personal best of 28:56.39. Representing Great Britain in the 10,000 metres at the 2026 European Athletics Championships in Birmingham on 15 August, he finished 17th in 29:09.43.
