= Marie Bouchard =

French long-distance runner

Personal information
- Born: 7 December 1993 (age 31)
- Height: 168 cm (5 ft 6 in)

Sport
- Country: France
- Sport: Long-distance running

Marie Bouchard (born 7 December 1993) is a French long-distance runner. In 2019, she competed in the senior women's race at the 2019 IAAF World Cross Country Championships held in Aarhus, Denmark. She finished in 62nd place.

In 2015, she won the silver medal in the women's 3000 steeplechase event at the 2015 French Athletics Championships.

In 2018, she competed in the women's 5000 metres at the 2018 Mediterranean Games held in Tarragona, Spain. She finished in 6th place.
