= Hugo Milner =

British athlete (born 1998)

Personal information
- Nationality: British (English)
- Born: 2 September 1998 (age 27) Derby, England
- Education: Harvard University
- Height: 6’4”

Sport
- Sport: Athletics, Triathlon
- Club: Derby AC
Medal record
Men's Athletics
Representing Great Britain
European Cross Country Championships
Bronze medal – third place	2024 Antalya	Team

Hugo Milner (born 2 September 1998) is a British triathlete and cross-country runner. He won the English national cross country title in 2024 and 2026.

== Early life ==
Milner attended Littleover Community School in Derbyshire, and in 2017 earned a scholarship to attend Harvard University where he studied Environmental Science and Public Policy.

== Career ==
=== Cross country ===
A member of Derby Athletic Club, Milner won the Cardiff Cross Country challenge, and the Milton Keynes Cross Country challenge in 2021.

In 2022, he finished runner-up at the Liverpool Cross Challenge and finished 32nd at the 2022 European Cross Country Championships.

Milner secured a victory in cross country at the Liverpool Cross Challenge in November 2023. He competed in Brussels at the 2023 European Cross Country Championships, finishing fourth overall.

On 20 January 2024, he won the London International Cross Country event and in September won the English National Cross Country Championships at Weston Park. In November 2024, he finished runner-up at the Liverpool Cross Challenge. He was subsequently selected for the British team for the 2024 European Cross Country Championships in Antalya, Turkey, where he was a bronze medalist in the team race.

Milner won the men's senior race at the London Cross Challenge at Parliament Hill on 7 February 2026, with the victory coming after he missed over six months of competition with a stress fracture. Later that month, he won the English National Cross Country Championships in Sedgefield ahead of James Kingston.

=== Triathlon ===
After taking up triathlon two years previously, Milner won the World Triathlon Cup event in Miyazaki, Japan in October 2023, in only his fourth World Cup race. In his previous two races, he had also clocked the best run split times.

He finished eighth at the E World Triathlon Championships in London in April 2024. That year, he joined Brownlee Racing. In March 2025, he confirmed his place at the Supertri E World Triathlon Championships.

In March 2026, Milner ran a 13:51 5 km to place third behind compatriot Oliver Conway and German Tim Hellwig at the World Triathlon Cup Haikou, in China, in March 2026.
