= Håkon Moe Berg =

Norwegian middle-distance runner (born 2006)

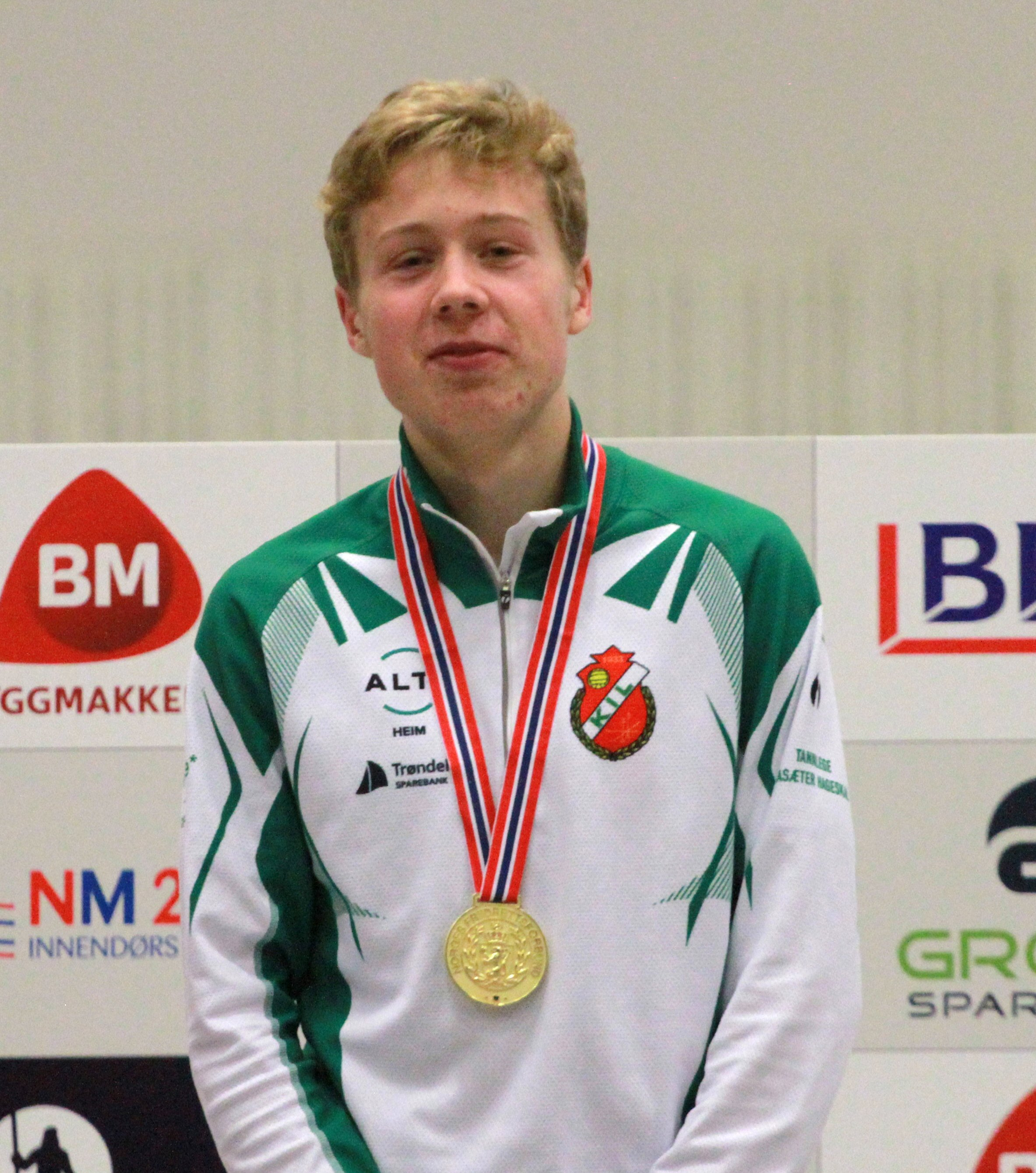
- Håkon Moe Berg

Personal information
- Nationality: Norwegian
- Born: 26 June 2006 (age 20)

Sport
- Sport: Athletics
- Event: Middle-distance running

Achievements and titles
- Personal best(s): 800m: 1:47.08 (Bergen, 2026); 1500m: 3:30.28 (Pfungstadt, 2025); 3000m: 7:55.82 (Jessheim, 2024)
Medal record
Men's athletics
Representing Norway
European U20 Championships
Gold medal – first place	2025 Tampere	1500 m
Gold medal – first place	2025 Tampere	3000 m

Håkon Moe Berg (born 26 June 2006) is a Norwegian middle-distance runner. He won the senior national championship title over 1500 metres in 2025 and was a double European under-20 champion that year over 1500 metres and 3000 metres. He previously won his first national title indoors over 1500 metres in 2024.

== Biography ==
Berg is from Kyrksæterøra. In June 2022, he placed ninth over 1500 metres at the senior Norwegian Athletics Championships. In August 2022, he competed in the 1500 meters at the 2022 European Athletics U18 Championships as a 16 year-old, placing fourth overall in Jerusalem, Israel. The following month, he won the 800 metres title at the Norwegian age-group championship.

In February 2024, he won the Norwegian Indoor Athletics Championships title over 1500 metres at the age of 17 years-old. In August 2024, he won the Norwegian under-20 title over 1500 metres outdoors in 3:43.97 ahead of his training mate Magnus Øyen. He subsequently placed sixth in the final of the 1500 metres at the 2024 World Athletics U20 Championships in Lima, Peru, in a time of 3:43.48.

=== 2025: Double European junior champion ===
In June 2025, he placed third in the 1500 metres at the 2025 Bislett Games, running a personal best time of 3:35.41. Later that month, he represented Norway at the 2025 European Athletics Team Championships finishing second in the 1500 metres in the Second Division race in Maribor, Slovenia, in 3:42.76. In August 2025, he won the Norwegian Athletics Championships title over 1500 metres. Later that month, he competed at the 2025 European Athletics U20 Championships in Tampere, Finland, where he completed a golden double; winning gold in the 1500 metres, before later winning the gold medal in the 3000 metres. Later that month, he ran a new personal best for the 1500m of 3:30.28 in Pfungstadt, Germany.

In September 2025, he competed at the 2025 World Championships in Tokyo, Japan, without advancing to the semi-finals. In September 2025, he was nominated for the European Athletics male rising star award.

=== 2026 ===
Berg opened his 2026 indoor season with a win over 1500 metres in 3:34.32, an indoor European U23 record, on his first race in the senior ranks at the BAUHAUS-Galan Indoor, a World Athletics Indoor Tour Silver meeting, in Stockholm. On 1 February, he set a new personal best of 1:47.90 to win the 800 metres at the Nordenkampen in Karlstad. On 8 February, he set a meeting record over 1500 metres at the Sparkassen Indoor Meeting Dortmund, a World Athletics Indoor Tour Bronze meeting, running 3:34.02, an indoor personal best. Competing at the 2026 World Athletics Indoor Championships in Toruń, Poland, he placed fifth in his 1500 m heat after being active in the race, but did not advance to the final. In May, he set a personal best in the 800 metres at the Trond Mohn Games in Bergen, running 1:47.08.
