= Karl Ottfalk =

Swedish athlete (born 2006)

Personal information
- Nationality: Swedish
- Born: 3 January 2006 (age 20)

Sport
- Sport: Athletics
- Event: Long distance running

Achievements and titles
- Personal best(s): 1500m: 3:43.55 (2024); 3000m: 7:58.05 (2024); 5000m: 13:57.13 (2024)
Medal record
Men's athletics
Representing SWE
European U20 Championships
Silver medal – second place	2025 Tampere	5000 m
Bronze medal – third place	2025 Tampere	3000 m
European Youth Olympic Festival
Gold medal – first place	2022 Banska Bystrica	3000 m

Karl Ottfalk (born 3 January 2006) is a Swedish long distance and cross country runner. In 2024, he became national senior champion over 5000 metres.

== Career ==
He won gold in the 3000 metres at the 2022 European Youth Summer Olympic Festival in Slovakia.

In 2023, he won the men's junior race at the Nordic Cross Country Championships. He finished fourth in the men's U20 race at the 2023 European Cross Country Championships in Brussels at the age of 17 years-old.

In June 2024, he became Swedish senior national champion over 5000 metres. In August 2024, he finished sixth at the 2024 World Athletics U20 Championships in Lima, Peru, in the Men's 3000 metres. He finished ninth in the 5000 metres at the same Championships.

Ottfalk placed fifth in the U20 race at the 2024 European Athletics Championships in Antalya, Turkey in December 2024.

At the 2025 European Athletics U20 Championships in Tampere, Finland, he won the silver medal over 5000 metres in August 2025. He later also won a second medal at the same championships, winning the bronze medal in the 3000 metres in a time of 8:46.43.

Ottfalk won the men's U20 race at the Nordic Cross Country Championships in Kastrup, Denmark, on 9 November 2025, also winning the team title with Sweden. He was selected to represent Sweden at the 2025 European Cross Country Championships in Portugal.
