= Cardiff Cross Challenge =

Annual cross country running competition in Cardiff, Whales

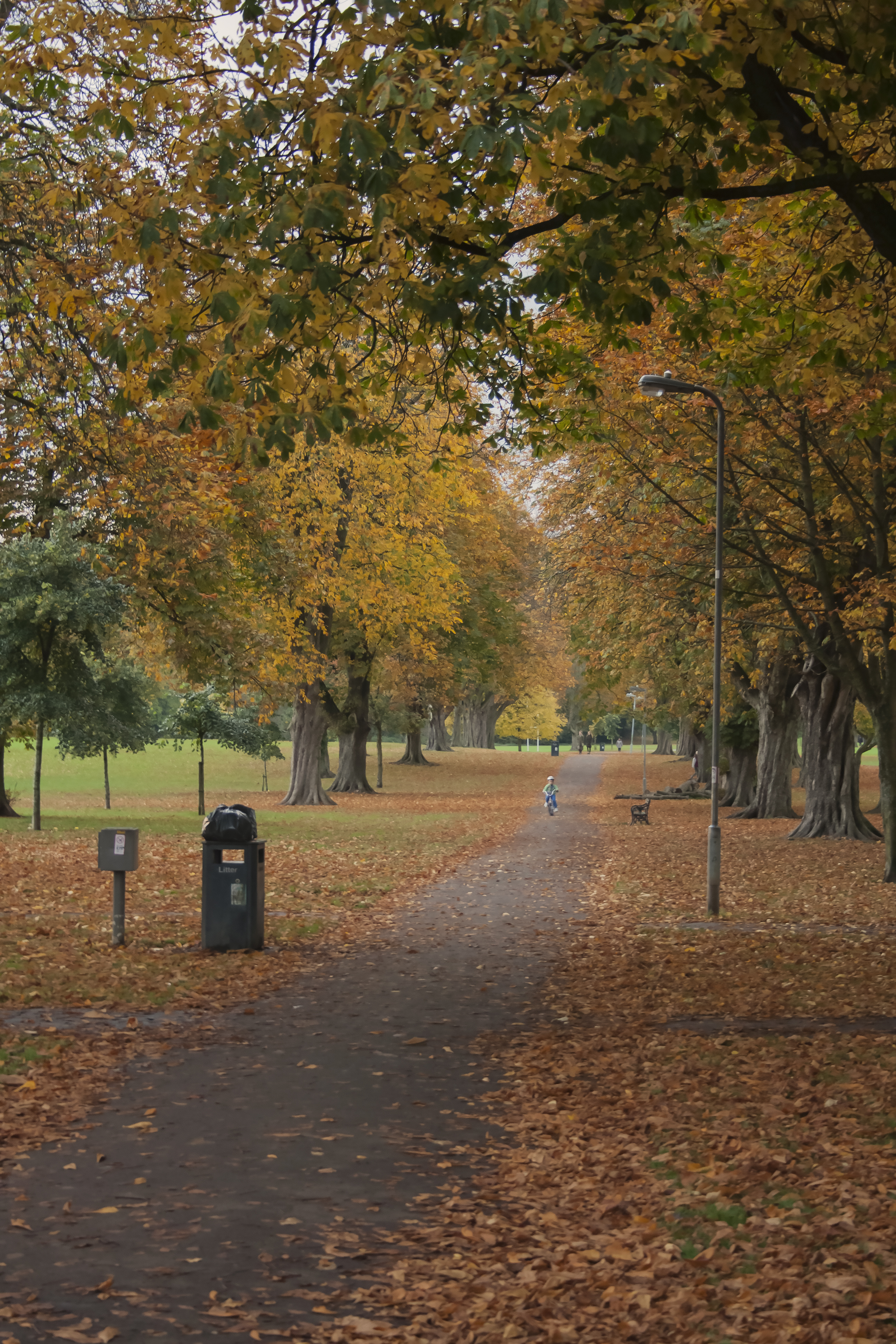
- Llandaff Fields, where the 2023 edition was held
- Date: October-November
- Location: Cardiff, Wales, United Kingdom
- Event type: Cross country
- Distance: 9.6 km (men); 6.4 km (women)
- Established: 1997

The Cardiff Cross Challenge, formerly known as the Reebok Cardiff International Cross-Country, McCain Cardiff Cross Challenge or British Athletics Cross Challenge #1, is an annual cross country running competition that takes place in Cardiff, Wales, United Kingdom. First held in 1997, it usually takes place in October or November and gained World Athletics Cross Country Tour Gold status, the highest-level designation awarded to international cross country races, in 2021.

Since October 2017, the competition features elite races of 9.6 km for men and 6.4 km for women, though the distances have varied before then. In 1997 and 1998, the race took place inside the Cardiff Castle walls, but it now takes place in Llandaff Fields. The race was founded and is still organized by Graham Finlayson.

== Past senior race winners ==
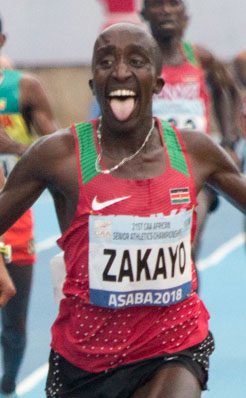
Edward Zakayo of Kenya won the men's race in 2022.

Edition	Date	Men's winner	Time (m:s)	Women's winner	Time (m:s)
1st	7 December 1997	Julius Kiptoo (KEN)	25:49	Vikki McPherson (GBR)	24:44
2nd	January 1999	Andrew Pearson (GBR)	30:54	Tara Kryzywicki (GBR)	22:36
3rd	1999/2000	Nick Comerford (GBR)		Andrea Whitcombe (GBR)	
4th	2000/01	Albert Chepkirui (KEN)		Hayley Yelling (GBR)	
5th	January 2002	Ben Whitby (GBR)		Liz Yelling (GBR)	22:03
6th	2002/03	Spencer Barden (GBR)		Hayley Yelling (GBR)	
7th	2003/04	Glyn Tromans (GBR)		Hayley Yelling (GBR)	
8th	2004/05	Peter Riley (GBR)		Hayley Yelling (GBR)	
9th	2005/06	Ben Noad (GBR)		Emily Pigeon (GBR)	
10th	2006/07	Ben Noad (GBR)		Hatti Dean (GBR)	
11th	2007/08	Jean Ndayisenga (BDI)		Andrea Whitcombe (GBR)	
12th	2008/09	Russell Dessaix-Chin (AUS)		Susie Hignett (GBR)	
13th	2009/10	Andy Vernon (GBR)		Hatti Dean (GBR)	
14th	2010/11	Frank Tickner (GBR)		Charlotte Purdue (GBR)	
15th	2011/12	Frank Tickner (GBR)		Lauren Howarth (GBR)	
16th	20 January 2013	Andy Vernon (GBR)	34:02 (10.37k)	Louise Damen (GBR)	25:21 (6.99k)
17th	19 January 2014	Adam Hickey (GBR)	33:05 (10.37k)	Charlotte Purdue (GBR)	25:09 (6.99k)
18th	18 January 2015	Adam Hickey (GBR)	33:36 (10.37k)	Lilly Partridge (GBR)	25:57 (6.99k)
19th	24 January 2016	Dewi Griffiths (GBR)	35:28	Caryl Jones (GBR)	26:52
20th	22 January 2017	Dewi Griffiths (GBR)	32:58 (10.37k)	Jessica Judd (GBR)	26:15 (6.99k)
21st	14 October 2017	Sam Stabler (GBR)	26:28	Jessica Judd (GBR)	19:39
22nd	13 October 2018	Charlie Hulson (GBR)	29:53	Anna Emilie Møller (DEN)	21:48
23rd	12 October 2019	Marc Scott (GBR)	29:21	Charlotte Arter (GBR)	21:31
24th	16 October 2021	Hugo Milner (GBR)	27:18	Charlotte Arter (GBR)	20:11
25th	15 October 2022	Edward Zakayo (KEN)	26:20	Pamela Kosgei (KEN)	20:21
26th	11 November 2023	Keneth Kiprop (UGA)	28:32	Megan Keith (GBR)	20:35
27th	9 November 2024	Keneth Kiprop (UGA)	27:06	Charity Cherop (UGA)	20:15
28th	8 November 2025	Mathew Kipsang (KEN)	28:14	Cynthia Chepkirui (KEN)	20:11
29th	8 November 2026	Matt Ramsden (GBR)	27:26	Kate Axford (GBR)	20:37
