= India at the 2018 World Athletics U20 Championships =

- WA code: IND
- Website: indianathletics.in

in Tampere
- Competitors: 29 in 17 events
- Medals Ranked 18th: Gold 1 Silver 0 Bronze 0 Total 1

World Athletics U20 Championships appearances
- auto

India competed at the 2018 World Athletics U20 Championships in Nairobi, Kenya, from 10 to 15 July 2018.

== Medalists ==
Medal	Name	Sport	Event
Gold	Hima Das	Athletics	Women's 400 metres

== Results ==
(q – qualified, NM – no mark, SB – season-best)

=== Men ===
Track and road events

Athlete	Event	Preliminaries		Heat		Semifinal		Final	
Athlete	Event	Result	Rank	Result	Rank	Result	Rank	Result	Rank
Gaurav	400 metres	Not Available		48.61	42	Did not advance			
Beant Singh	800 metres	Not Available		1:49.66	15	Did not advance			
Ankit	1500 metres	Not Available		4:05.15	36	Did not advance			
Kartik Kumar	10,000 metres	N/A						30:30.28	12
Prajwal Mandanna Akash Kumar Balakumar Nithin P.S. Saneesh	4 x 100 m relay	Not Available		41.11	17	Did not advance			
Rajesh Ramesh Devender Kumar Stanley Cibbinkumar Ayush Dabas	4 x 400 m relay	Not Available		3:14.19	16	Did not advance			

Field events

Athlete	Event	Qualification		Final	
Athlete	Event	Distance	Position	Distance	Position
M Sreeshankar	Long Jump	7.68	4 q	7.75	6
Sathyanathan Lokesh	Long Jump	7.31	17	Did not advance	
Kangaraj Kamalraj	Triple Jump	15.98	3 Q	15.82	5
Ashish Bholothia	Shot put	18.62	14	Did not advance	
Ashish Jakhar	Hammer Throw	70.52	8 q	74.59	6
Damneet Singh	Hammer Throw	67.48	15	Did not advance	
Sahil Silwal	Javelin throw	73.22	5 Q	72.83	4
Arshdeep Singh	Javelin throw	63.05	23	Did not advance	

=== Women ===
Track and road events

Athlete	Event	Preliminaries		Heat		Semifinal		Final	
Athlete	Event	Result	Rank	Result	Rank	Result	Rank	Result	Rank
Hima Das	400 metres	Not Available		52.25	1 Q	52.10	1 Q	51.46	1st place, gold medalist(s)
Jisna Mathew	400 metres	Not Available		54.32	16 Q	53.86	13	Did not advance	
Durga Pramod Deore	1500 metres	Not Available		DNF		Did not advance			
Sapna Kumari	100 m Hurdles	Not Available		14.15	32	Did not advance			
V Subha Jisna Mathew Ritika Hima Das	4 x 400 m relay	Not Available		3:39.10	12	Did not advance			

Field events

Athlete	Event	Qualification		Final	
Athlete	Event	Distance	Position	Distance	Position
Suresh Priyadarshini	Triple Jump	12.50	20	Did not advance	
Arpandeep Kaur	Discus Throw	48.17	21	Did not advance	
Muthuramalingam Karuniya	Discus Throw	43.96	26	Did not advance	
