= Winnie Jemutai =

Kenyan runner (born 2003)

Personal information
- Full name: Winnie Jemutai Boinett
- Nationality: Kenya
- Born: 4 October 2003 (23 years, 37 days old) or 4 June 2003 (23 years, 159 days old) or 9 February 2002 (24 years, 274 days old)
- Home town: Burnt Forest, Uasin Gishu County, Kenya
- Father: Micah Boinett

Sport
- Sport: Athletics
- Events: 5000 metres 2000 metres steeplechase
- Club: Uganda People's Defence Force

Achievements and titles
- Personal bests: 5000m: 14:39.05 (2023) 2000mSC: 5:52.92 (2023)
Medal record
Women's athletics
Representing Kenya
World U20 Championships
Bronze medal – third place	2021 Nairobi	1500 m
- Updated on 20 February 2024

Winnie Jemutai Boinett (born 4 October 2003, 4 June 2003, or 9 February 2002) is a Kenyan middle- and long-distance runner as well as a steeplechase runner. She was the bronze medallist in the 1500 m at the 2021 World U20 Championships, and in 2023 she returned to racing setting the #3 all-time mark in the outdoor 2000 metres steeplechase.

== Career ==
Jemutai began her career in the 1500 metres, racing that distance six times in 2021. For a brief period of time, Jemutai represented the Uganda People's Defence Force at the 5th and 7th 2021 Ugandan National Trials, finishing runner-up at the former event.

At the 2021 Kenyan World U20 trials, Jemutai finished 2nd in 4:17.55, qualifying her for the 2021 World Athletics U20 Championships. At the championships, she finished 2nd in her semi-final to advance behind Diribe Welteji. In the finals, Jemutai finished 3rd, winning her first international medal.

Jemutai did not return to racing until 2023. After debuting in the 3000 metres steeplechase in 9:45.11 to win the Kenyan Defence Forces Championships, she traveled to France and won the Meeting National de Strasbourg 1500 m in a personal best of 4:09.62. Making her track 5000 m debut, Jemutai finished 2nd at the 2023 ISTAF Berlin meeting in 14:56, behind only Letesenbet Gidey who just missed the 5000 m world record ahead. Five days later at the 2023 Memorial Van Damme, Jemutai improved her time to 14:39.05 to finish 4th. Just two days after her new personal best, Jemutai ran 5:52.92 at the Hanžeković Memorial 2000 metres steeplechase, a mark making her the #5 performer of all time in that event and the #3 performer outdoors. She finished her season in November by placing in two Spanish World Athletics Cross Country Tour meetings.

At one of the aforementioned cross country races, she provided a sample which ultimately tested positive for exogenous testosterone. She was originally given a four-year ban; however, this was reduced to three years after she admitted to the doping violation. Her period of ineligibility began on 29 February 2024 and she was disqualified from all of her results since 12 November 2023 (the date the sample was provided).

== Personal life ==
Jemutai is from Burnt Forest, Uasin Gishu County, Kenya. Her father is Micah Boinett, a former steeplechase runner who competed in the 1985 World Cross Country Championships and won the 1989 NJCAA Men's Division I Cross Country Championship representing the Blinn College Buccaneers.

== Statistics ==
=== Personal best progression ===
1500m progression
#	Mark	Pl.	Competition	Venue	Date	Ref.
1	4:24.56 A	2nd place, silver medalist(s)	5th Ugandan National Trials	Kampala, Uganda	9 April 2021	
2	4:21.04 A	(silver) (Heat 2)	Kenyan World U20 Trials	Nairobi, Kenya	1 July 2021	
3	4:17.55 A	2nd place, silver medalist(s)	Kenyan World U20 Trials	Nairobi, Kenya	2 July 2021	
4	4:10.18 A	3rd place, bronze medalist(s)	Kenya Defence Forces Championships	Nairobi, Kenya	25 May 2023	
5	4:09.62	1st place, gold medalist(s)	Meeting National de Strasbourg	Strasbourg, France	15 June 2023	

5000m progression
#	Mark	Pl.	Competition	Venue	Date	Ref.
1	16:10 (road)	8th	Urban Trail de Lille	Lille, France	6 November 2021	
2	14:56.99	2nd place, silver medalist(s)	ISTAF Berlin	Berlin, Germany	2 September 2023	
3	14:39.05	4th	Memorial van Damme	Bruxelles, Belgium	7 September 2023	
