= 2018 IAAF World U20 Championships – Women's 4 × 400 metres relay =

Women's 4 × 400 metres relay at the 2018 World Athletics U20 Championships
- Venue: Tampere Stadium
- Dates: 14-15 July

Medalists
gold medal	Symone Mason; Shae Anderson; Julia Madubuike; Taylor Manson	United States
silver medal	Ella Connolly; Cara Jardine; Jemima Russell; Carley Thomas	Australia
bronze medal	Janielle Josephs; Stacey-Ann Williams; Chrissani May; Calisha Taylor	Jamaica

The women's 4 × 400 metres relay at the 2018 IAAF World U20 Championships will be held at Ratina Stadium on 14 and 15 July.

== Records ==
World Junior Record	United States	3:27.60	Grosseto, Italy	18 July 2004
Championship Record	United States	3:27.60	Grosseto, Italy	18 July 2004
World Junior Leading	Germany	3:35.08	Regensburg, Germany	3 June 2018

== Results ==
=== Heats ===
Qualification: First 2 of each heat ( Q ) plus the 2 fastest times ( q ) qualified for the final.

Rank	Heat	Nation	Athletes	Time	Notes
1	3	United States	Symone Mason, Shae Anderson, Jan'Taijah Ford, Arria Minor	3:33.11	Q, WJL
2	1	Jamaica	Janielle Josephs, Stacey-Ann Williams, Chrissani May, Calisha Taylor	3:34.22	Q, WJL
3	2	Australia	Ella Connolly, Cara Jardine, Jemima Russell, Carley Thomas	3:35.48	Q, SB
4	1	Italy	Camilla Pitzalis, Eloisa Coiro, Chiara Gherardi, Elisabetta Vandi	3:35.86	Q, NJR
5	2	Canada	Xahria Santiago, Aurora Rynda, Sharelle Samuel, Ashlan Best	3:36.14	Q, SB
6	3	Dominican Republic	Milagros Durán, Lilian Reyes, Maria Fernanda Matos, Fiordaliza Cofil	3:36.22(.214)	Q, NJR
7	1	Brazil	Marlene Santos, Tiffani Silva, Chayenne Da Silva, Leticia Lima	3:36.22(.215)	q, AJR
8	3	Germany	Anna-Maria Hofmann, Lisa Sophie Hartmann, Johanna Berrens, Laura Kaufmann	3:36.50	q
9	2	Japan	Ayano Shiomi, Shuri Aono, Moeka Sekimoto, Ayaka Kawata	3:36.70	SB
10	1	Poland	Natalia Widawska, Natalia Wosztyl, Weronika Bartnowska, Karolina Łozowska	3:38.23	SB
11	1	Hungary	Janka Molnár, Hanna Répássy, Mira Koszegi, Sára Mátó	3:38.49	SB
12	2	India	V Subha, Jisna Mathew, Ritika, Hima Das	3:39.10	NJR
13	3	Ethiopia	Mahilet Fikre, Diribe Welteji, Zinash Tesfaye, Frehiywot Wondie	3:39.29	NJR
14	3	Finland	Nea Mattila, Mette Baas, Wilma Lassfolk, Viivi Lehikoinen	3:39.58	SB
15	1	China	Tianlu Lan, Yu Zhou, Jiadie Mo, Nuo Liang	3:42.04	SB
16	3	Slovakia	Emma Zapletalová, Mária Šimlovicová, Sophia Zápotocná, Miriam Cidoríková	3:44.05	NJR
17	2	Ukraine	Maryana Shostak, Olena Radyuk, Tetyana Kaysen, Tetyana Bezshyyko	3:44.74	SB
18	3	South Africa	Liza Kellerman, Marlie Viljoen, Nicola Gibbon, Zeney Van Der Walt	3:50.39	
19	2	Sri Lanka	Sandumini Bandara, Shyamali Kumarasinghe, Romeshi Ishara Attidiya, Amasha De Silva	3:51.02	

=== Final ===
Rank	Nation	Athletes	Time	Notes
1st place, gold medalist(s)	United States	Symone Mason, Shae Anderson, Julia Madubuike, Taylor Manson	3:28.74	WJL
2nd place, silver medalist(s)	Australia	Ella Connolly, Cara Jardine, Jemima Russell, Carley Thomas	3:31.36	SB
3rd place, bronze medalist(s)	Jamaica	Janielle Josephs, Stacey-Ann Williams, Shiann Salmon, Calisha Taylor	3:31.90	SB
4	Canada	Xahria Santiago, Aurora Rynda, Ashlan Best, Sharelle Samuel	3:31.93	NJR
5	Germany	Anna-Maria Hofmann, Lisa Sophie Hartmann, Laura Kaufmann, Corinna Schwab	3:32.84	SB
6	Italy	Camilla Pitzalis, Eloisa Coiro, Chiara Gherardi, Elisabetta Vandi	3:34.00	NJR
7	Dominican Republic	Milagros Durán, Lilian Reyes, Maria Fernanda Matos, Fiordaliza Cofil	3:34.09	NR
8	Brazil	Marlene Santos, Tiffani Silva, Chayenne Da Silva, Leticia Lima	3:34.55	AJR
