= Lalu Muhammad Zohri =

Indonesian sprinter

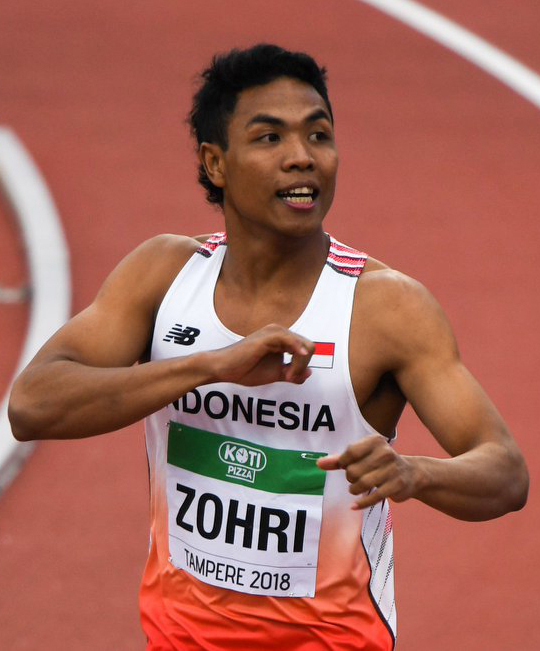
- Zohri at the 2018 IAAF World U20 Championships

Personal information
- Nationality: Indonesian
- Born: 1 July 2000 (age 26) North Lombok, West Nusa Tenggara, Indonesia
- Height: 172 cm (5 ft 8 in)
- Weight: 60 kg (132 lb)

Sport
- Sport: Track and field
- Event: Sprints

Achievements and titles
- Personal bests: 100 m: 10.03 NR (Osaka 2019); 200 m: 20.81 NR (Bogor 2019)
Medal record
Men's athletics
Representing Indonesia
Asian Games
| Silver medal – second place | 2018 Jakarta–Palembang | 4 × 100 m relay |
Asian Championships
| Silver medal – second place | 2019 Doha | 100 m |
SEA Games
| Gold medal – first place | 2023 Cambodia | 4 × 100 m relay |
| Silver medal – second place | 2025 Thailand | 100 m |
| Bronze medal – third place | 2023 Cambodia | 200 m |
| Bronze medal – third place | 2025 Thailand | 4 × 100 m relay |
World U20 Championships
| Gold medal – first place | 2018 Tampere | 100 m |
Asian Junior Championships
| Gold medal – first place | 2018 Gifu | 100 m |
ASEAN University Games
| Gold medal – first place | 2024 Surabaya–Malang | 100 m |
| Bronze medal – third place | 2024 Surabaya–Malang | 4 × 100 m relay |
ASEAN School Games
| Silver medal – second place | 2017 Singapore | 200 m |

Lalu Muhammad Zohri (born 1 July 2000) is an Indonesian track and field sprinter. He is the first Indonesian male to win a medal at the IAAF World U20 Championships by winning a gold medal in the 100m. He is the current holder of the Indonesian 100m and 200m national records, and is labelled the "fastest man in Southeast Asia".

== Early life ==
Zohri was born on 1 July 2000 and raised in West Pemenang village of the Pemenang subdistrict in North Lombok Regency, on the eastern island of Lombok, in a house made of wood and woven bamboo. He is the youngest of four children. His mother died when he was in elementary school, and his father died when he was 17. He couldn't even afford shoes, prompting him to train barefoot. He convinced his sister to lend him Rp 400,000 (21 Euros) so he could buy a pair of spikes for his meets, although this partly came from his allowance. He won the 100 m at the 2018 Asian Junior Athletics Championships in Japan in a time of 10.27 seconds.

== Career ==
Zohri competed for Indonesia at the 2017 ASEAN School Games, participating in the men's 200 m and winning the silver medal with a time of 21.74. He then took part in the 2018 IAAF World U20 Championships in the 100 m. In the first round, he placed first with a time of 10.30 seconds. In semifinal 1, he placed second with a slightly better time at 10.24, behind World Youth 100m Record Holder and gold medal favorite Anthony Schwartz. He was drawn to lane eight in the final, which started less than three hours later. When the pistol fired, Zohri got a decent start, staying right behind Schwartz who led. He closed-in slowly at 60 metres, and in the last ten metres, he surged ahead of Schwartz to take the gold medal by a dip. His time of 10.18 seconds (+1.2 m/s) became an Indonesian junior record, just slightly different from Indonesian National Record at the time of 10.17 by Suryo Agung Wibowo at the 2009 SEA Games.

Zohri was labeled as a national hero for his deeds; Indonesian President Joko Widodo ordered two cabinet ministers to arrange for his house to be renovated. Zohri is part of a contingent of high performing Indonesian athletes, coached by Harry Marra, a program designed to make Indonesia a competitive player in the international athletics scene.

On home soil in the 2018 Asian Games, he reached the finals but placed seventh with a time of 10.20 seconds in the 100 m. He and his fellow athletes won a silver medal in the 4 × 100 m relay, Zohri was the second runner.

Following the Asian Games, Zohri participated in the inaugural event of the Malaysia Open Grand Prix, timing 10.20 seconds in the 100m race and winning gold. In the 2019 Asian Athletics Championships, Zohri recorded 10.13 seconds in 100m, placing second behind Japanese Yoshihide Kiryū. During the competition's semifinals, Zohri recorded 10.15 seconds, which was a new national record until the finals less than 150 minutes later. On 19 May 2019, Zohri further improved his record to 10.03 seconds as he won a bronze medal in the 2019 Seiko Golden Grand Prix in Osaka, breaking Southeast Asian records and securing a spot in the qualifications for the 2020 Tokyo Olympics.

He further broke the 200m national record in August 2019, when he finished at 20.81 seconds during the 200m finals of the 2019 Indonesian National Athletics Championship in Bogor, West Java. He represented Indonesia at the 100 metre race in the 2020 Summer Olympics, being eliminated in the qualifiers. He took part in the 2022 World Athletics Championships, passing through preliminaries before timing at 10.42 in the heat and failing to qualify for semifinals. During the 2023 SEA Games, Zohri injured his quadriceps during warmups for the 200m finals, although he still won a bronze medal and later a gold medal in the 4x100m relay. However, the injury forced him to drop out from the 100m finals.

Zohri also competed for Indonesia at the 2020 Summer Olympics and 2024 Summer Olympics.

== Statistics ==
=== Major international competitions and multi-sport events ===
| Year | Competition | Venue | Position | Event | Notes |
|---|---|---|---|---|---|
| 2017 | ASEAN School Games | Singapore | 2nd | 200 m | 21.74 |
| 2018 | Asian Junior Championships | Gifu, Japan | 1st | 100 m | 10.27 |
| 2018 | World U20 Championships | Tampere, Finland | 1st | 100 m | 10.18 |
| 2018 | Asian Games | Jakarta, Indonesia | 7th | 100 m | 10.20 |
| 2018 | Asian Games | Jakarta, Indonesia | 2nd | 4 × 100 m relay | 38.77 |
| 2019 | Asian Championships | Doha, Qatar | 2nd | 100 m | 10.13 |
| 2019 | IAAF World Relays | Yokohama, Japan | 19th | 4 × 100 m relay | 39.39 |
| 2019 | World Championships | Doha, Qatar | 35th (h) | 100 m | 10.36 |
| 2021 | Olympic Games | Tokyo, Japan | 39th (h) | 100 m | 10.26 |
| 2022 | World Indoor Championships | Belgrade, Serbia | 9th (h) | 60 m | 6.58^{1} |
| 2022 | SEA Games | Hanoi, Vietnam | 4th | 100 m | 10.59 |
| 2022 | SEA Games | Hanoi, Vietnam | 4th | 4 × 100 m relay | 39.65 |
| 2022 | World Championships | Eugene, United States | 43rd (h) | 100 m | 10.42 |
| 2023 | SEA Games | Phnom Penh, Cambodia | 3rd | 200 m | 21.02 |
| 2023 | SEA Games | Phnom Penh, Cambodia | 1st | 4 × 100 m relay | 39.11 |
| 2023 | SEA Games | Phnom Penh, Cambodia | 6th (h) | 100 m | 10.56^{2} |
| 2023 | Asian Games | Hangzhou, China | 6th | 100 m | 10.16 |
| 2023 | Asian Games | Hangzhou, China | 5th | 4 × 100 m relay | 39.25 |
| 2024 | ASEAN University Games | Surabaya, Indonesia | 1st | 100 m | 10.19 |
| 2024 | ASEAN University Games | Surabaya, Indonesia | 3rd | 4 × 100 m relay | 40.93 |
| 2024 | Olympic Games | Paris, France | 42nd (h) | 100 m | 10.26 |
| 2025 | Asian Championships | Gumi, South Korea | 18th (h) | 100 m | 10.54^{1} |
| 2026 | Asian Indoor Championships | Tianjin, China | 6th | 60 m | 6.69 |

^{1}Did not start in the semifinals
^{2}Did not start in the finals

=== Other international competitions ===
| Year | Competition | Venue | Position | Event | Notes |
|---|---|---|---|---|---|
| 2019 | Malaysian Open | Kuala Lumpur, Malaysia | 1st | 100 m | 10.20 |
| 2019 | Seiko Golden Grand Prix | Osaka, Japan | 3rd | 100 m | 10.03 |
| 2019 | Seiko Golden Grand Prix | Osaka, Japan | 5th | 4 × 100 m relay | 39.76 |
| 2024 | Kinami Michitaka Memorial Meet | Osaka, Japan | 7th | 100 m | 10.79 |
| 2024 | Taiwan Open | Taipei, Taiwan | 1st | 100 m | 10.27 |

== Personal bests ==
Outdoor

- 100 metres – 10.03 (+1.7 m/s, Osaka 2019)
- 200 metres – 20.81 (-0.7 m/s, Cibinong 2019)

Indoor

- 60 metres – 6.58 (Belgrade 2022)

== Awards and nominations ==
| Award | Year | Category | Result | Ref. |
|---|---|---|---|---|
| Forbes | 2021 | 30 Under 30 Asia (Entertainment and Sports) | Placed | |
| Golden Award SIWO PWI | 2019 | Hope Male Athlete | Won | |
| Indonesian Sport Awards | 2018 | Talented Young Athlete of the Year | Won | |
| iNews Indonesia Awards | 2019 | Achievement Athlete Category | Won | |
