= Harry Marra =

American track and field coach (born 1947)

Harry Marra (born 1947 in Cohoes, New York) is an American track and field coach. He is best known as the coach of decathlon world record holder Ashton Eaton. After improving the world record twice and two world championship gold medals, Eaton closed off his career by becoming only the third man to defend the Olympic gold medal in the decathlon. Eaton is also the world record holder in the indoor Heptathlon and won three world championships. He also coached Brianne Theisen, Paul Terek, Sheldon Blockburger and four other 8,000 point decathletes; Brian Brophy, Paul Foxon, Bart Goodell and Chris Wilcox. Theisen won two world championship silver medals in the women's heptathlon, plus the Commonwealth Games and world indoor pentathlon gold medalist for Canada. Training partners under Marra, Eaton and Theisen were married in July 2013, officiated by Marra.

Marra was a pole vaulter sprinter at Christian Brothers Academy in nearby Albany, New York. After receiving some helpful coaching tips there he learned

"a light went on that there's a right way to do things, and there's a wrong way to do things."

Marra got his B.S. Degree at Mount Saint Mary's University and his master's degree from Syracuse University. He was an assistant coach at University of California, Santa Barbara, under Sam Adams before his first head coaching job at Springfield College. From 1981 to 1993, Marra coached at San Francisco State University, while simultaneously serving as a speed and fitness consultant for the San Francisco Giants.

Marra was the American National Decathlon Coach from 1990-2000. When Eaton's original coach Dan Steele left, Vin Lananna first sought Marra's recommendations for a coach. Not liking the recommendations, Lananna offered Marra the job. He became a full-time assistant coach for multi-events at the University of Oregon, where he coached both Eaton and Theisen to NCAA championships in their respective events. Working for the Oregon Track Club he continued to coach them while also coaching the Oregon Ducks.

Marra's technique involves breaking complex events into simple movements following scientific principles. As an example he cites Eaton's unique shuffle shot put technique Video on YouTube originating from an act of frustration. In 2012, Coach Marra was named NIKE COACH OF THE YEAR by USATF, the National Governing body of Track and Field in the USA. Additionally, in 2016, after a highly successful Rio Olympic Games for his athletes, Coach Marra was named WORLD ATHLETICS COACH OF THE YEAR.

At the end of 2016, after Eaton had won his second gold medal and Theisen had won bronze at the 2016 Olympics, Marra was given the World Athletics Awards for Coaching Achievement Award. Following his accepting of the award, Marra was approached by several countries to assist in developing their athletic teams. He accepted the offer from Indonesia. In 2018, one of his new charges Lalu Muhammad Zohri won the world junior championships in the 100 meters. He continues to do coaching clinics around the world. Marra has been inducted into the Christian Brothers Academy, San Francisco State University, Pacific Association USATF, Greater Capital District Track and Field Hall of Fame, Mt. St. Mary's University and The University of Oregon Halls of Fame. Marra just recently had his first book published....Title: Stories From The Passenger Seat / Lessons Learned from a Lifetime of Coaching...Coaches Choice Publishers, September, 2022. In December of 2022, USATF presented Coach Marra the " John Bennett Award " for Excellence in the area of Combined Events Coaching.

In February 2024, Sportsfoundation.org ranked the top 10 Track and Field Coaches in the world of all time. Coach Harry Marra was ranked number one.
