= Janielle Josephs =

Jamaican athlete (born 2000)

Personal information
- National team: Jamaica
- Born: 3 October 2000 (age 25) Kingston, Jamaica
- Education: St Andrew High School; University of Minnesota

Sport
- Sport: Athletics
- Events: 200 metres 400 metres
- University team: Minnesota Golden Gophers

Janielle Josephs (born 3 October 2000) is a Jamaican track and field athlete who specialises in the 200 metres, 400 metres and 4 × 400 metres relay events. In 2018, she won the bronze medal in the 4 x 400 metres at the 2018 IAAF World U20 Championships.

== Early life and education ==
Janielle Josephs was born on 3 October 2000 in Kingston, Jamaica to Garnett Josephs and Edweena Roberts. Josephs started competing in athletic events after her mother noticed her affinity for running and encouraged her to participate. Josephs enjoyed several of her sixth form subjects but she said that she got involved in running initially because she "wanted to miss school". She attended St Andrew High School for Girls in the parish of Saint Andrew. While at the school, she won both the 200 and 400 metres races at the Digicel Anthrick Corporate Area Championship. In the latter, she was awarded $25,000 after she broke Tiffany James' existing record with a time of 55.15 seconds.

After graduating from high school in 2019, she began attending the University of Minnesota and competing for their college team Minnesota Golden Gophers. In her freshman year, she was named the Big Ten Freshman of the Year.

== Career ==
In 2018, Josephs competed for Jamaica at the CARIFTA Games in Nassau, where she ran the 4x400m relay and won bronze in the 400 metres. The same year, Josephs won another bronze medal in the 4 x 400 metres at the 2018 IAAF World U20 Championships, and placed second in the Under-20 400 metres at the 2018 JAAA National Junior Championships.

In April 2026, she was selected to be a part of the Jamaican 4 x 400 metres team at the World Athletics Relays in Gaborone the following month. Achieving their season best with a time of 3:27.19, the team finished fifth in Heat 1 and failed to advance. Also in May, Josephs was the runner-up in the 400 metres in the JAAA Puma Meet Two with a time of 53.62.
