= Jackline Wambui =

Kenyan middle-distance runner

Jackline Wambūi
Personal information
- Nationality: Kenyan
- Born: 8 February 2000 (age 26)

Sport
- Sport: Running
- Event: 800 metres

Achievements and titles
- Personal best: 800 m: 1:58.79 (Nairobi 2019)
Medal record
Women's athletics
World Youth Championships
| Gold medal – first place | 2017 Nairobi | 800 m |

Jackline Wambūi (born 8 February 2000) is a Kenyan middle-distance runner who competes in the 800 metres event.

Wambūi won the gold medal in the 800 meters at the 2017 IAAF World U18 Championships in Nairobi. The following year, she finished eighth at the 2018 IAAF World U20 Championships in Tampere. In April 2019, she won the African Junior Championships in Abidjan, and then in August won the Kenyan National Championships.

She withdrew from the 2019 IAAF World Athletics Championships after not taking a mandatory testosterone level test. In 2024, World Athletics filed a CAS case against Wambūi and the Anti-Doping Agency of Kenya related to the violation.

Her personal best for the 800m is 1:58.79, set at Nyayo National Stadium, Nairobi, on 13 September 2019.
