= 2018 IAAF World U20 Championships – Women's 800 metres =

Women's 800 metres at the 2018 World U20 Championships
- Venue: Ratina Stadium
- Dates: 10, 11 and 12 July
- Competitors: 39 from 27 nations
- Winning time: 1:59.74

Medalists
gold medal	Diribe Welteji	Ethiopia
silver medal	Carley Thomas	Australia
bronze medal	Delia Sclabas	Switzerland

The women's 800 metres at the 2018 IAAF World U20 Championships was held at Ratina Stadium on 10, 11 and 12 July.

== Records ==
Standing records prior to the 2018 IAAF World U20 Championships in Athletics
World Junior Record	Pamela Jelimo (KEN)	1:54.01	Zürich, Switzerland	29 August 2008
Championship Record	Elena Mirela Lavric (ROM)	2:00.06	Bydgoszcz, Poland	11 July 2008
World Junior Leading	Keely Small (AUS)	2:00.81	Gold Coast, Queensland, Australia	12 April 2018

== Results ==
=== Heats ===
Qualification: First 4 of each heat (Q) and the 4 fastest times (q) qualified for the semifinals.

Rank	Heat	Name	Nationality	Time	Note
1	3	Ayaka Kawata	Japan	2:05.08	Q
2	1	Ayano Shiomi	Japan	2:05.13	Q
3	5	Diribe Welteji	Ethiopia	2:05.18	Q
4	1	Jackline Wambui	Kenya	2:05.27	Q
5	3	Lydia Jeruto Lagat	Kenya	2:05.63	Q
6	3	Maeliss Trapeau	France	2:05.72	Q
7	1	Samantha Watson	United States	2:06.34	Q
8	3	Camille Muls	Belgium	2:06.41	Q
9	1	Jemima Russell	Australia	2:06.84	Q
10	5	Katy-Ann McDonald	Great Britain	2:07.24	Q
11	5	Eloisa Coiro	Italy	2:07.31	Q
12	5	Delia Sclabas	Switzerland	2:07.43	Q
13	5	Shaquena Foote	Jamaica	2:07.75	q
14	5	Marharyta Kachanava	Belarus	2:07.87	q
15	2	Freweyni Hailu	Ethiopia	2:08.26	Q
16	2	Carley Thomas	Australia	2:08.57	Q
17	2	Gabriela Gajanová	Slovakia	2:08.89	Q
18	3	Federica Cortesi	Italy	2:09.27	q
19	5	Jo Keane	Ireland	2:09.59	q
20	1	Jinlian Tan	China	2:09.81	
21	1	Mia Helene Mørck	Denmark	2:09.82	
22	2	Chrissani May	Jamaica	2:09.88	Q
23	3	Liza Kellerman	South Africa	2:10.05	
24	1	Klara Lukan	Slovenia	2:10.08	
25	2	Raquel Meaños	Spain	2:10.13	
26	2	Freja Wærness	Denmark	2:10.50	
27	4	Caitlyn Collier	United States	2:11.30	Q
28	4	Isabelle Boffey	Great Britain	2:11.43	Q
29	4	Milena Korbut	Poland	2:11.52	Q
30	3	Carolina Hernandez-Pita	Switzerland	2:11.52	
31	4	Majtie Kolberg	Germany	2:11.61	Q
32	4	Sanne Njaastad	Norway	2:11.82	
33	4	María Lasa	Spain	2:12.04	
34	2	Aurora Rynda	Canada	2:12.31	
35	1	Veera Perälä	Finland	2:12.38	
36	3	Haley Walker	Canada	2:12.76	
37	4	Shyamali Kumarasingha	Sri Lanka	2:12.91	
38	2	Albina Deliu	Kosovo	2:19.84	
	5	Linda Philip Mamun	Athlete Refugee Team	DQ	

=== Semifinals ===
Qualification: First 2 of each heat (Q) and the 2 fastest times (q) qualified for the final.

Rank	Heat	Name	Nationality	Time	Note
1	2	Diribe Welteji	Ethiopia	2:01.89	Q
2	1	Freweyni Hailu	Ethiopia	2:01.96	Q
3	1	Delia Sclabas	Switzerland	2:02.12	Q, NJR
4	3	Carley Thomas	Australia	2:03.19	Q, PB
5	2	Katy-Ann McDonald	Great Britain	2:03.20	Q, PB
6	3	Gabriela Gajanová	Slovakia	2:03.36	Q, PB
7	3	Ayaka Kawata	Japan	2:03.37	q
8	1	Jackline Wambui	Kenya	2:03.44	q, SB
9	2	Ayano Shiomi	Japan	2:03.72	
10	3	Caitlyn Collier	United States	2:03.95	
11	1	Samantha Watson	United States	2:03.95	
12	2	Lydia Jeruto Lagat	Kenya	2:04.59	
13	2	Jemima Russell	Australia	2:04.81	PB
14	3	Maeliss Trapeau	France	2:05.35	
15	3	Marharyta Kachanava	Belarus	2:06.53	
16	3	Milena Korbut	Poland	2:06.60	
17	2	Eloisa Coiro	Italy	2:06.85	SB
18	1	Jo Keane	Ireland	2:06.91	PB
19	1	Shaquena Foote	Jamaica	2:08.02	
20	2	Camille Muls	Belgium	2:08.16	
21	1	Federica Cortesi	Italy	2:09.85	
22	2	Majtie Kolberg	Germany	2:10.66	
23	3	Chrissani May	Jamaica	2:10.70	
24	1	Isabelle Boffey	Great Britain	2:11.49	

=== Final ===
Rank	Lane	Name	Nationality	Time	Note
1st place, gold medalist(s)	3	Diribe Welteji	Ethiopia	1:59.74	CR
2nd place, silver medalist(s)	8	Carley Thomas	Australia	2:01.13	PB
3rd place, bronze medalist(s)	6	Delia Sclabas	Switzerland	2:01.29	NJR
4	1	Gabriela Gajanová	Slovakia	2:01.90	PB
5	4	Freweyni Hailu	Ethiopia	2:02.80	
6	5	Ayaka Kawata	Japan	2:03.57	
7	7	Katy-Ann McDonald	Great Britain	2:04.08	
8	2	Jackline Wambui	Kenya	2:04.61	
