= Eric Harrison Jr. =

Trinidad and Tobago sprinter

Eric Harrison Jr. OLY
Personal information
- Nationality: Trinidad and Tobago
- Born: 18 February 1999 (age 27) Washington, D.C., United States
- Agent: Mark Pryor, World Express Sports Mgmt

Sport
- Sport: Athletics
- Event: 100 metres
Medal record
Athletics
Representing the United States
IAAF World U20 Championships
Gold medal – first place	2018 Tampere	4x100 m
Bronze medal – third place	2018 Tampere	100 m
Bronze medal – third place	2018 Tampere	200 m
Representing Trinidad and Tobago
Commonwealth Games
Silver medal – second place	2022 Birmingham	4×100 m relay

Eric Harrison Jr. (born 18 February 1999) is an athlete, who has represented the United States and Trinidad and Tobago. He competed in the men's 4 × 100 metres relay event at the 2020 Summer Olympics.

== Career ==
Harrison comes from Washington, D.C. Representing the United States at the 2018 IAAF World U20 Championships in Tampere, Finland, Harrison won a gold medal and two bronze medals. He won gold in the men's 4 × 100 metres relay, and bronze in thee 100 metres and the 200 metres.

Harrison's mother is from Trinidad, and became eligible to represent Trinidad and Tobago on 15 July 2021. Initially, Harrison missed the trials for the 2020 Summer Olympics because of illness, but he later qualified for the Trinidad and Tobago relay team based on his results in the 100 metres. His training was also impacted by the COVID-19 pandemic, with the indoor track season being cancelled in March 2020.
