= Micah Williams (sprinter) =

American sprinter

Personal information
- National team: United States
- Born: November 12, 2001 (age 24) Portland, Oregon, U.S.
- Height: 5 ft 8 in (173 cm)
- Weight: 176 lb (80 kg)

Sport
- Country: United States
- Sport: Athletics
- Event: Sprinting
- Club: Oregon Ducks

Achievements and titles
- Personal bests: 100 m: 9.86 (2022); 200 m: 20.05 (2022)
Medal record
World U20 Championships
Gold medal – first place	2018 Tampere	4 × 100 m relay

Micah Williams (born November 12, 2001) is an American sprinter.

His 9.91 Oregon school record qualified him as U.S. Olympian alternate in the 4 × 100 relay for the 2021 Olympics and attracted nationwide media interest.

He was gold medalist in the 4 × 100 relay in the 2018 IAAF World U20 Championships in Tampere, Finland.

At the 2022 USATF Golden Games, he recorded a wind-assisted time of 9.83.

== Early life ==
Williams worked for Amazon during high school, where he was once told that he did not move fast enough when packing boxes.

Williams competed in the USA Junior Championships, finishing eighth (200 meter) in 2015, third (100) and fourth (200) in 2016, fourth (100) and fifth (200) in 2017 and fourth (100) in 2018. The latter year he also was fourth in the OSAA 6A state champion (100 and 200).

== Career ==
In 2021, Williams became No. 7 collegiate all-time performer in the 60-meter dash (6.49 seconds). He was a three-time Gatorade Oregon Boys' Track and Field Runner of the Year while competing for Benson Polytechnic High School after setting the state meet record (10.42) and the state's all-time best 100m time (10.21).

As of 2022, his personal best in the 200-meter dash is 20.05.

In 2022, Williams set a new personal best of 9.86 in the 100-meter dash.

Beginning with the 2023-2024 season Williams is a member of the University of Oregon football team, playing wide receiver and wearing the number #84.

== Personal records ==
- 60 meters: 6.48 ( (United States) Spokane), January 25, 2022
- 100 meters: 9.86 (+0.7 m/s) ( (United States) Fayetteville), May 27, 2022
- 200 meters: 20.05 (0.0 m/s) ( (United States) Eugene), May 15, 2022

== See also ==
10-second barrier
