= 2018 IAAF World U20 Championships – Women's 400 metres =

Women's 400 metres at the 2018 World U20 Championships
- Venue: Ratina Stadium
- Dates: 10, 11 and 12 July
- Competitors: 39 from 29 nations
- Winning time: 51.46

Medalists
gold medal	Hima Das	India
silver medal	Andrea Miklós	Romania
bronze medal	Taylor Manson	United States

The women's 400 metres at the 2018 IAAF World U20 Championships was held at Ratina Stadium on 10, 11 and 12 July.

== Records ==
Standing records prior to the 2018 IAAF World U20 Championships
World U20 Record	Grit Breuer (GER)	49.42	Tokyo, Japan	27 August 1991
Championship Record	Ashley Spencer (USA)	50.50	Barcelona, Spain	13 July 2012
World U20 Leading	Sydney McLaughlin (USA)	50.07	Gainesville, United States	30 March 2018

== Results ==
=== Heats ===
Qualification: First 4 of each heat (Q) and the 4 fastest times (q) qualified for the semifinals.

Rank	Heat	Name	Nationality	Time	Note
1	4	Hima Das	India	52.25	Q
2	1	Taylor Manson	United States	52.68	Q
3	4	Stacey-Ann Williams	Jamaica	52.71	Q, SB
4	2	Mary Moraa	Kenya	52.85	Q, PB
5	3	Ella Connolly	Australia	52.99	Q, SB
6	2	Andrea Miklós	Romania	53.14	Q
7	3	Tiffani Silva	Brazil	53.18	Q
8	3	Roxana Gómez	Cuba	53.19	Q
9	1	Davicia Patterson	Ireland	53.20	Q
10	2	Elisabetta Vandi	Italy	53.51	Q, PB
11	1	Stella Wonruku	Uganda	53.55	Q
12	2	Frehiywot Wondie	Ethiopia	53.59	Q
13	1	Sharelle Samuel	Canada	53.62	Q, PB
14	4	Ashlan Best	Canada	53.91	Q SB
15	4	Fiordaliza Cofil	Dominican Republic	54.13	Q
16	5	Jisna Mathew	India	54.32	Q
17	1	Nuo Liang	China	54.33	q SB
18	2	Giovana Rosalia dos Santos	Brazil	54.35	q
19	5	Amanda Crawford	Grenada	54.37	Q
20	1	Angie Melisa Arévalo	Colombia	54.42	q, PB
21	3	Shalysa Wray	Cayman Islands	54.48	Q
22	4	Yu Zhou	China	54.49	q, SB
23	4	Martina Weil	Chile	54.52	
24	3	Camilla Pitzalis	Italy	54.59	PB
25	2	Ciara Deely	Ireland	54.69	
26	5	Veronica Vancardo	Switzerland	54.93	Q
27	5	Laura Kaufmann	Germany	54.96	Q
28	2	Mette Baas	Finland	55.42	
29	3	Milagros Durán	Dominican Republic	55.56	
30	5	Symone Mason	United States	55.66	
31	5	Mahilet Fikre	Ethiopia	55.88	
32	4	Tetyana Kaysen	Ukraine	57.14	
33	3	Nicola Gibbon	South Africa	57.90	
34	5	Maria Alejandra Carmona	Nicaragua	58.39	PB
35	1	Marlie Viljoen	South Africa	59.01	
36	1	Aishath Himna Hassan	Maldives	59.76	NJR
37	5	Patricija Karlina Roshofa	Latvia	1:00.08	
	3	Rae-Anne Serville	Trinidad and Tobago	DNF	
	2	Pamela Milano	Venezuela	DNS	

=== Semifinals ===
Qualification: First 2 of each heat (Q) and the 2 fastest times (q) qualified for the final.

Rank	Heat	Name	Nationality	Time	Note
1	1	Hima Das	India	52.10	Q
2	1	Andrea Miklós	Romania	52.48	Q
3	3	Ella Connolly	Australia	52.78	Q, SB
4	3	Mary Moraa	Kenya	52.98	Q
5	1	Stacey-Ann Williams	Jamaica	53.00	q
6	2	Taylor Manson	United States	53.00	Q
7	2	Ashlan Best	Canada	53.24	Q, PB
8	1	Elisabetta Vandi	Italy	53.24	q, NJR
9	2	Roxana Gómez	Cuba	53.26	
10	2	Tiffani Silva	Brazil	53.30	
11	3	Davicia Patterson	Ireland	53.57	
12	1	Sharelle Samuel	Canada	53.68	
13	2	Jisna Mathew	India	53.86	
14	2	Fiordaliza Cofil	Dominican Republic	53.94	
15	1	Yu Zhou	China	54.00	SB
16	3	Frehiywot Wondie	Ethiopia	54.14	
17	3	Giovana Rosalia dos Santos	Brazil	54.30	
18	1	Shalysa Wray	Cayman Islands	54.32	
19	1	Stella Wonruku	Uganda	54.32	
20	3	Amanda Crawford	Grenada	54.36	
21	2	Laura Kaufmann	Germany	54.91	
22	3	Veronica Vancardo	Switzerland	55.13	
23	3	Nuo Liang	China	55.51	
	2	Angie Melisa Arévalo	Colombia	DNS	

=== Final ===
Rank	Lane	Name	Nationality	Time	Note
1st place, gold medalist(s)	4	Hima Das	India	51.46	
2nd place, silver medalist(s)	3	Andrea Miklós	Romania	52.07	PB
3rd place, bronze medalist(s)	6	Taylor Manson	United States	52.28	
4	5	Ella Connolly	Australia	52.82	
5	7	Mary Moraa	Kenya	52.94	
6	1	Stacey-Ann Williams	Jamaica	53.23	
7	2	Elisabetta Vandi	Italy	53.40	
8	8	Ashlan Best	Canada	53.59	
