= Damion Thomas =

Jamaican hurdler (born 1999)

Damion Thomas Jr.
Personal information
- Born: 29 June 1999 (age 27)

Sport
- Country: Jamaica
- Sport: Track and field
- Event: Hurdles
- College team: LSU Tigers
- Coached by: Dennis Shaver

Achievements and titles
- Personal bests: 60 mH: 7.51 (Fayetteville, 2021); 110 mH: 13.11 (Kingston, 2021)
Medal record
Men's athletics
Representing Jamaica
World U20 Championships
Gold medal – first place	2018 Tampere	110 m hurdles
Carifta Games Youth (U18)
Gold medal – first place	2016 St. George's	110 m hurdles

Damion Thomas Jr. (born 29 June 1999) is a Jamaican sprinter who specialises in the 110 and 60m hurdles. He was the gold medalist over 110 metres hurdles at the 2018 IAAF World U20 Championships and competed at the 2020 Olympic Games and 2024 World Athletics Indoor Championships.

== Biography ==
Thomas attended Oakland Park Northeast High School in Florida. He ran for Jamaica in the 110 metres hurdles at the 2016 IAAF World U20 Championships, but was eliminated in the semi-final after falling.

Thomas competed for Jamaica at the 2017 Pan American U20 Athletics Championships, where he was the fastest qualifier for the 100 metres hurdles final before ultimately finishing in fourth place overall. On 23 June 2018, he equaled Wilhem Belocian's 110m hurdles junior world record of 12.99 seconds when winning the 2018 Jamaican Junior Championships held in Kingston, Jamaica. Later that year, he won the 110m hurdles at the 2018 IAAF World U20 Championships in Tampere, Finland.

Thomas competed in the United States collegiate system for Louisiana State University (LSU). Thomas won the 2021 NCAA Indoor Championships in the 60 metres hurdles in 7.51 seconds ahead of Jamal Britt and Trey Cunningham. The time broke the LSU school record, and moved Thomas to fifth on the NCAA all-time list. In April 2021, whilst competing at the Texas Relays, Thomas set a new program record for LSU in the 110 metres hurdles, running a wind legal time of 13.22 seconds.

In June 2021, Thomas finished as runner-up to Ronald Levy in the 110 metres hurdles at the senior Jamaican Athletics Championships in Kingston, running a personal best of 13.11 seconds (+0.6 m/s). Selected for the delayed 2020 Summer Games held in Tokyo, Japan, in 2021, Thomas ran 13.54 seconds to qualify from his heat, prior to running 13.39 seconds to finish third in his semi-final in the men's 110m hurdles, missing out on a place in the final by a few hundredths of a second.

Thomas placed fourth in the 110 metres hurdles at the 2022 Jamaican Championships in Kingston, in 13.36 seconds, and fifth the following year in 13.41 seconds at the 2023 Jamaican Championships.

In February 2024, he was selected to compete over 60 metres hurdles for Jamaica at the 2024 World Athletics Indoor Championships in Glasgow, Scotland, running 7.73 seconds without advancing to the semi-finals.

In June 2026, Thomas joined American athletes Abby Steiner and Champion Allison in a lawsuit against shoe manufacturer Puma alleging that marketed carbon-plated shoes "could place abnormal and unnecessary stress on athletes’ feet and lower legs, contributing to life-altering injuries".
