= 2018 IAAF World U20 Championships – Men's 110 metres hurdles =

Men's 110 metres hurdles at the 2018 World U20 Championships
- Venue: Ratina Stadium
- Dates: 11 and 12 July
- Competitors: 55 from 38 nations
- Winning time: 13.16

Medalists
| gold medal | Damion Thomas | Jamaica |
| silver medal | Orlando Bennett | Jamaica |
| bronze medal | Shunsuke Izumiya | Japan |

The men's 110 metres hurdles at the 2018 IAAF World U20 Championships was held at Ratina Stadium on 11 and 12 July.

== Records ==
Standing records prior to the 2018 IAAF World U20 Championships
| World Junior Record | Wilhem Belocian (FRA) | 12.99 | Eugene, United States | 24 July 2014 |
| Championship Record | Wilhem Belocian (FRA) | 12.99 | Eugene, United States | 24 July 2014 |
| World Junior Leading | Damion Thomas (JAM) | 12.99 | Kingston, Jamaica | 23 June 2018 |

== Results ==
=== Heats ===
Qualification: First 3 of each heat (Q) and the 3 fastest times (q) qualified for the semifinals.

Wind:
Heat 1: +1.0 m/s, Heat 2: +0.9 m/s, Heat 3: +0.7 m/s, Heat 4: +0.3 m/s, Heat 5: +0.3 m/s, Heat 6: +0.9 m/s, Heat 7: +1.1 m/s

| Rank | Heat | Name | Nationality | Time | Note |
|---|---|---|---|---|---|
| 1 | 1 | Damion Thomas | Jamaica | 13.41 | Q |
| 2 | 7 | Enrique Llopis | Spain | 13.47 | Q, PB |
| 3 | 6 | Anastas Eliopoulos | Canada | 13.58 | Q |
| 4 | 1 | Jason Nicholson | Great Britain | 13.58 | Q, PB |
| 5 | 3 | Joshua Zeller | Great Britain | 13.59 | Q |
| 6 | 7 | Cory Poole | United States | 13.60 | Q |
| 7 | 4 | Michael Obasuyi | Belgium | 13.62 | Q |
| 8 | 6 | Mattia Montini | Italy | 13.63 | Q |
| 9 | 1 | Joseph Anderson | United States | 13.64 | Q |
| 10 | 2 | Orlando Bennett | Jamaica | 13.65 | Q |
| 11 | 5 | Luis Salort | Spain | 13.66 | Q |
| 12 | 3 | Jeanice Laviolette | France | 13.69 | Q |
| 13 | 2 | Stefan Volzer | Germany | 13.74 | Q |
| 14 | 3 | David Ryba | Czech Republic | 13.75 | Q |
| 15 | 7 | Mathéo Bernat | France | 13.77 | Q |
| 16 | 6 | Owaab Barrow | Qatar | 13.78 | Q, NJR |
| 17 | 5 | Oscar Smith | Bahamas | 13.79 | Q |
| 18 | 7 | Sales Inglin | Switzerland | 13.79 | q |
| 19 | 3 | Kentaro Hiraga | Japan | 13.80 | q |
| 20 | 6 | Tuur Bras | Belgium | 13.82 | q |
| 21 | 5 | Filip Jakob Demšar | Slovenia | 13.82 | Q |
| 22 | 2 | Rasheem Brown | Cayman Islands | 13.83 | Q |
| 23 | 2 | Dániel Eszes | Hungary | 13.86 | |
| 24 | 4 | Shunsuke Izumiya | Japan | 13.86 | Q |
| 25 | 2 | Denvaughn Whymns | Bahamas | 13.91 | PB |
| 26 | 3 | Alin Ionut Anton | Romania | 13.91 | |
| 27 | 3 | Ali Abdulmohsin Al Kamal | Iraq | 13.93 | |
| 28 | 5 | Liam Mather | Canada | 13.93 | PB |
| 29 | 7 | Stanislav Stankov | Bulgaria | 13.94 | |
| 30 | 5 | Silusapho Dingiswayo | South Africa | 13.97 | |
| 31 | 1 | David Yefremov | Kazakhstan | 14.01 | |
| 32 | 1 | Marcos Herrera | Ecuador | 14.02 | SB |
| 33 | 6 | Chong Wei Guan | Singapore | 14.03 | NJR |
| 34 | 5 | Hao-Hua Lu | Chinese Taipei | 14.09 | |
| 35 | 4 | Saoud Al Humaidi | Qatar | 14.11 | Q |
| 36 | 5 | Oleksiy Ovcharenko | Ukraine | 14.11 | |
| 37 | 2 | Alexandru Ionut Iconaru | Romania | 14.12 | |
| 38 | 4 | Xiaohan Ning | China | 14.12 | |
| 39 | 1 | Sondre Guttormsen | Norway | 14.13 | |
| 40 | 1 | Emrah Bozkurt | Turkey | 14.23 | |
| 41 | 2 | Konstantinos Tziakouris | Cyprus | 14.25 | |
| 42 | 7 | José Roberto Radilla | Mexico | 14.27 | |
| 43 | 4 | Kristiyan Patarov | Bulgaria | 14.30 | |
| 44 | 6 | Áron Kalácska | Hungary | 14.32 | |
| 45 | 4 | Mattia Di Panfilo | Italy | 14.33 | |
| 46 | 3 | Domingo Polette | Chile | 14.37 | |
| 47 | 3 | Halomoan Edwin Binsar | Indonesia | 14.47 | |
| 48 | 4 | Mohammad Alenezi | Kuwait | 14.54 | |
| 49 | 6 | Serhat Bulut | Turkey | 14.57 | |
| 50 | 4 | Dave Wesselink | Netherlands | 14.59 | |
| 51 | 7 | Jesse Väyrynen | Finland | 15.23 | |
| 52 | 5 | Xin Xu | Macau | 15.28 | |
| | 2 | Siegfried Zoller | Switzerland | DNF | |
| | 7 | Andriy Vasylevskyy | Ukraine | DQ | |
| | 6 | Vittor Souza | Brazil | DQ | |

=== Semifinals ===
Qualification: First 2 of each heat (Q) and the 2 fastest times (q) qualified for the final.

Wind:
Heat 1: -0.5 m/s, Heat 2: +0.2 m/s, Heat 3: +1.4 m/s

| Rank | Heat | Name | Nationality | Time | Note |
|---|---|---|---|---|---|
| 1 | 3 | Jason Nicholson | Great Britain | 13.32 | Q PB |
| 2 | 3 | Damion Thomas | Jamaica | 13.37 | Q |
| 3 | 2 | Orlando Bennett | Jamaica | 13.45 | Q |
| 4 | 2 | Michael Obasuyi | Belgium | 13.49 | Q |
| 5 | 2 | Enrique Llopis | Spain | 13.51 | q |
| 6 | 2 | Shunsuke Izumiya | Japan | 13.57 | q |
| 7 | 1 | Cory Poole | United States | 13.68 | Q |
| 8 | 2 | Joseph Anderson | United States | 13.68 | |
| 9 | 1 | Anastas Eliopoulos | Canada | 13.75 | Q |
| 10 | 3 | Tuur Bras | Belgium | 13.76 | |
| 11 | 2 | Sales Inglin | Switzerland | 13.80 | |
| 12 | 1 | Mathéo Bernat | France | 13.88 | |
| 13 | 2 | Jeanice Laviolette | France | 13.91 | |
| 14 | 3 | Stefan Volzer | Germany | 13.91 | |
| 15 | 1 | Joshua Zeller | Great Britain | 13.91 | |
| 16 | 1 | Kentaro Hiraga | Japan | 13.93 | |
| 17 | 1 | David Ryba | Czech Republic | 13.93 | |
| 18 | 3 | Filip Jakob Demšar | Slovenia | 13.93 | |
| 19 | 3 | Owaab Barrow | Qatar | 14.05 | |
| 20 | 1 | Mattia Montini | Italy | 14.09 | |
| 21 | 1 | Saoud Al Humaidi | Qatar | 14.14 | |
| 22 | 2 | Rasheem Brown | Cayman Islands | 14.40 | |
| 23 | 3 | Oscar Smith | Bahamas | 15.31 | |
| | 3 | Luis Salort | Spain | DQ | |

=== Final ===
Wind: +0.3 m/s

| Rank | Lane | Name | Nationality | Time | Note |
|---|---|---|---|---|---|
| 1st place, gold medalist(s) | 6 | Damion Thomas | Jamaica | 13.16 | |
| 2nd place, silver medalist(s) | 4 | Orlando Bennett | Jamaica | 13.33 | |
| 3rd place, bronze medalist(s) | 2 | Shunsuke Izumiya | Japan | 13.38 | PB |
| 4 | 8 | Michael Obasuyi | Belgium | 13.45 | |
| 5 | 3 | Jason Nicholson | Great Britain | 13.62 | |
| 6 | 5 | Cory Poole | United States | 13.74 | |
| | 7 | Anastas Eliopoulos | Canada | DNF | |
| | 1 | Enrique Llopis | Spain | DNF | |
