= 2018 IAAF World U20 Championships =

International athletics competition

2018 World U20 Championships in Athletics
- Host city: Tampere, Finland
- Nations: 156 + 2 teams
- Athletes: 1462
- Events: 44
- Dates: 10–15 July
- Opened by: Sauli Niinistö
- Main venue: Tampere Stadium

The 2018 World U20 Championships in Athletics, also known as the World Junior Championships, was an international athletics competition for athletes qualifying as juniors (born no earlier than 1 January 1999) which was held at Tampere Stadium in Tampere, Finland on 10–15 July 2018. The championships were originally awarded to Tampere by the IAAF in March, 2016.

== Schedule ==
Q	Qualification	H	Heats	½	Semifinals	F	Final
M = morning session, A = afternoon session

All dates are EEST (UTC+3)

Men
Date →	10 July		11 July			12 July		13 July		14 July		15 July
Event ↓	M	A	M	A		M	A	M	A	M	A	A
100 m	H			½	F							
200 m						H	½		F			
400 m			H				½		F			
800 m								H			½	F
1500 m	H						F					
3000 m SC						H						F
5000 m											F	
10,000 m	F											
110 m hurdles			H	½			F					
400 m hurdles						H			½		F	
4 × 100 m relay									H		F	
4 × 400 m relay										H		F
10,000 m walk										F		
High jump							Q			F		
Pole vault				Q							F	
Long jump	Q			F								
Triple jump									Q		F	
Shot put	Q	F										
Discus throw										Q		F
Hammer throw			Q						F			
Javelin throw								Q			F	
Decathlon	F											

Women
Date →	10 July		11 July		12 July			13 July		14 July		15 July
Event ↓	M	A	M	A	M	A		M	A	M	A	A
100 m			H			½	F					
200 m								H	½		F	
400 m		H		½		F						
800 m	H			½		F						
1500 m						H						F
3000 m SC	H								F			
3000 m				F								
5000 m		F										
100 m hurdles								H			½	F
400 m hurdles			H			½			F			
4 × 100 m relay									H		F	
4 × 400 m relay										H		F
10,000 m walk										F		
High jump								Q				F
Pole vault		Q				F						
Long jump					Q				F			
Triple jump										Q		F
Shot put			Q	F								
Discus throw		Q				F						
Hammer throw					Q						F	
Javelin throw	Q			F								
Heptathlon					F							

== Qualifying Standards ==
Event	Men	Women
100 m	10.55	11.80
200 m	21.35	24.20
400 m	47.70	55.00
800 m	1:50.00	2:08.70
1500 m	3:48.00	4:27.00
5000 m	5000 m 14:15.00; 8:15.00 (3000 m)	5000 m 16:40.00; 9:35.00 (3000 m)
10,000 m	31:00.00 10,000 m	–
3000 m sc	9:10.00	10:43.00
100 mH	–	14.10
110 mH	14.20 0.995 m	–
400 mH	53.00	60.75
10,000 m RW	44:00.00	51:00.00
4 × 100 m Relay	No standard	No standard
4 × 400 m Relay	No standard	No standard
Heptathlon	–	5300 points
Decathlon	7200 points	–
High Jump	2.16 m	1.82 m
Pole Vault	5.10 m	4.05 m
Long Jump	7.55 m	6.15 m
Triple Jump	15.60 m	12.85 m
Shot Put	18.25 m (6 kg)	14.50 m
Discus	56.00 m	48.00 m
Hammer	68.00 m (6 kg)	57.00 m
Javelin	68.70 m	50.00 m

== Men's results ==
=== Track ===
Event	Gold		Silver		Bronze	
100 m	Lalu Muhammad Zohri; Indonesia	10.18 NJR	Anthony Schwartz; United States	10.22	Eric Harrison; United States	10.22 PB
200 m	Jona Efoloko; Great Britain	20.48 PB	Charles Dobson; Great Britain	20.57	Eric Harrison; United States	20.79
400 m	Jonathan Sacoor; Belgium	45.03 NJR	Christopher Taylor; Jamaica	45.38	Chantz Sawyers; Jamaica	45.89
800 m	Solomon Lekuta; Kenya	1:46.35	Ngeno Kipngetich; Kenya	1:46.45 PB	Eliott Crestan; Belgium	1:47.27
1500 m	George Manangoi; Kenya	3:41.71	Jakob Ingebrigtsen; Norway	3:41.89	Justus Soget; Kenya	3:42.14
5000 m	Edward Zakayo; Kenya	13:20.16	Stanley Mburu; Kenya	13:20.57	Jakob Ingebrigtsen; Norway	13:20.78 AJR
10,000 m	Rhonex Kipruto; Kenya	27:21.08 CR	Jacob Kiplimo; Uganda	27:40.36	Berihu Aregawi; Ethiopia	27:48.41 PB
110 m hurdles (99.0 cm)	Damion Thomas; Jamaica	13.18	Orlando Bennett; Jamaica	13.33	Shunsuke Izumiya; Japan	13.38 PB
400 m hurdles	Sokwakhana Zazini; South Africa	49.42	Bassem Hemeida; Qatar	49.59 PB	Alison dos Santos; Brazil	49.78 PB
3000 m steeplechase	Takele Nigate; Ethiopia	8:25.35 SB	Leonard Bett; Kenya	8:25.39	Getnet Wale; Ethiopia	8:26.16 SB
4 × 100 m relay	United States; Eric Harrison; Anthony Schwartz; Austin Kratz; Micah Williams	38.88 WJL	Jamaica; Xavier Nairne; Christopher Taylor; Jhevaughn Matherson; Michael Stephens	38.96 NJR	Germany; Lucas Ansah-Peprah; Marvin Schulte; Milo Skupin-Alfa; Luis Brandner	39.22
4 × 400 m relay	Italy; Klaudio Gjetja; Andrea Romani; Alessandro Sibilio; Edoardo Scotti; Lorenzo Benati (heats)	3:04.05 WJL, AJR	United States; Elija Godwin; Nicholas Ramey; Justin Robinson; Howard Fields; Matthew Boling; Umajesty Williams	3:05.24	Great Britain; Alex Haydock-Wilson; Joseph Brier; Alastair Chalmers; Alex Knibbs	3:05.64
10,000 m walk	Zhang Yao; China	40:32.06 PB	David Hurtado; Ecuador	40:32.06 PB	José Ortiz; Guatemala	40:45.26 PB

- WJR (World Junior Record), WJL (World Junior Leader), CR (Championship Record), AJR (Area Junior Record), NJR (National Junior Record ), PB (Personal Best), SB (Season Best)

=== Field ===
Event	Gold		Silver		Bronze	
High jump	Adónios Mérlos PB; Greece; Roberto Vílches; Mexico	2.23m	Not Awarded		JuVaughn Blake PB; United States; Breyton Poole; South Africa	2.23m
Pole vault	Armand Duplantis; Sweden	5.82m CR	Zachery Bradford; United States	5.55m PB	Masaki Ejima; Japan	5.55m
Long jump	Yuki Hashioka; Japan	8.03m	Maikel Vidal; Cuba	7.99m	Wayne Pinnock; Jamaica	7.90m
Triple jump	Jordan Díaz; Cuba	17.15m CR	Martin Lamou; France	16.44m	Jonathan Seremes; France	16.18m PB
Shot put (6 kg)	Kyle Blignaut; South Africa	22.07m WJL	Adrian Piperi; United States	22.06m AJR	Odisséas Mouzenídis; Greece	21.07m NJR
Discus throw (1.750 kg)	Kai Chang; Jamaica	62.36m PB	Yauheni Bahutski; Belarus	61.75m	Claudio Romero; Chile	60.81m SB
Hammer throw (6 kg)	Jake Norris; Great Britain	80.65m NJR	Mykhaylo Kokhan; Ukraine	79.68m PB	Mykhaylo Havryliuk; Ukraine	77.71m PB
Javelin throw	Nash Lowis; Australia	75.31m PB	Tzuriel Pedigo; United States	73.76m PB	Maurice Voigt; Germany	73.44m PB
Decathlon (junior)	Ashley Moloney; Australia	8190 pts CR, AJR, WJL	Gary Haasbroek; Australia	7798 pts PB	Simon Ehammer; Switzerland	7642 pts PB

- WJR (World Junior Record), WJL (World Junior Leader), CR (Championship Record), AJR (Area Junior Record), NJR (National Junior Record ), PB (Personal Best), SB (Season Best)

== Women's results ==
=== Track ===
Event	Gold		Silver		Bronze	
100 m	Briana Williams; Jamaica	11.16	Twanisha Terry; United States	11.19	Kristal Awuah; Great Britain	11.37
200 m	Briana Williams; Jamaica	22.50 CR	Lauren Rain Williams; United States	23.09	Martyna Kotwiła; Poland	23.21 NJR
400 m	Hima Das; India	51.46	Andrea Miklós; Romania	52.07 PB	Taylor Manson; United States	52.28
800 m	Diribe Welteji; Ethiopia	1:59.74; CR, WJL	Carly Thomas; Australia	2:01.13 PB	Delia Sclabas; Switzerland	2:01.29 NJR
1500 m	Alemaz Samuel; Ethiopia	4:09.67	Miriam Cherop; Kenya	4:10.73	Delia Sclabas; Switzerland	4:11.98
3000 m	Nozomi Tanaka; Japan	8:54.01 PB	Meselu Berhe; Ethiopia	8:56.39 PB	Tsigie Gebreselama; Ethiopia	8:59.20 PB
5000 m	Beatrice Chebet; Kenya	15:30.77 PB	Ejgayehu Taye; Ethiopia	15:30.87 PB	Girmawit Gebrzihair; Ethiopia	15:34.01 PB
100 m hurdles	Tia Jones; United States	13.01	Britany Anderson; Jamaica	13.01 PB	Cortney Jones; United States	13.19
400 m hurdles	Zenéy van der Walt; South Africa	55.34	Shiann Salmon; Jamaica	56.11	Yasmin Giger; Switzerland	56.98
3000 m steeplechase	Celliphine Chespol; Kenya	9:12.79 CR	Peruth Chemutai; Uganda	9:18.87	Winfred Mutile Yavi; Bahrain	9:23.47
4 × 100 m relay	Germany; Victoria Dönicke; Corinna Schwab; Sophia Junk; Denise Uphoff	43.82	Ireland; Molly Scott; Gina Akpe-Moses; Ciara Neville; Patience Jumbo Gula	43.90 NJR	Great Britain; Kristal Awuah; Alisha Rees; Georgina Adam; Ebony Carr	44.05
4 × 400 m relay	United States; Symone Mason; Shae Anderson; Julia Madubuike; Taylor Manson	3:28.74 WJL	Australia; Ella Connolly; Cara Jardine; Jemima Russell; Carley Thomas	3:31.36 SB	Jamaica; Janielle Josephs; Stacey-Ann Williams; Shiann Salmon; Calisha Taylor	3:31.90 SB
10,000 m walk	Alegna González; Mexico	44:13.88 WJL	Meryem Bekmez; Turkey	44:17.69 NJR	Glenda Morejón; Ecuador	44:19.40 AJR

- WJR (World Junior Record), WJL (World Junior Leader), CR (Championship Record), AJR (Area Junior Record), NJR (National Junior Record ), PB (Personal Best), SB (Season Best)

=== Field ===
Event	Gold		Silver		Bronze	
High jump	Karyna Demidik; Belarus	1.92m NU20R	Sommer Lecky; Ireland	1.90m NU20R	María Fernanda Murillo; Colombia	1.90m = AU20R
Pole vault	Amálie Švábíková; Czech Republic	4.51m NJR	Lisa Gunnarsson; Sweden	4.35m	Alice Moindrot; France	4.35m
Long jump	Lea-Jasmine Riecke; Germany	6.51m PB	Ayaka Kora; Japan	6.37m	Tara Davis; United States	6.36m
Triple jump	Aleksandra Nacheva; Bulgaria	14.18m WJL PB	Mirieli Santos; Brazil	13.81m PB	Davisleydi Velazco; Cuba	13.78m
Shot put	Maddi Wesche; New Zealand	17.09m PB	Zhang Linru; China	17.05m	Jorinde van Klinken; Netherlands	17.05m
Discus throw	Alexandra Emilianov; Moldova	57.89m	Helena Leveelahti; Finland	56.80m NJR	Silinda Morales; Cuba	55.37m PB
Hammer throw	Camryn Rogers; Canada	64.90m	Alyssa Wilson; United States	64.45m	Yanitza Martínez; Cuba	63.82m
Javelin throw	Alina Shukh; Ukraine	55.95m	Tomoka Kuwazoe; Japan	55.66m	Dana Baker; United States	55.04m PB
Heptathlon	Niamh Emerson; Great Britain	6253 pts WJL	Sarah Lagger; Austria	6225 pts NJR	Adrianna Sułek; Poland	5939 pts NJR

- WJR (World Junior Record), WJL (World Junior Leader), CR (Championship Record), AJR (Area Junior Record), NJR (National Junior Record ), PB (Personal Best), SB (Season Best)

== Medal table ==
The host country is highlighted in lavender blue

Kenya won the ranking in the medal table.

Rank	Nation	Gold	Silver	Bronze	Total
1	Kenya	6	4	1	11
2	Jamaica	4	5	3	12
3	United States	3	8	7	18
4	Ethiopia	3	2	4	9
5	Great Britain	3	1	3	7
6	South Africa	3	0	1	4
7	Australia	2	3	0	5
8	Japan	2	2	2	6
9	Germany	2	0	2	4
10	Mexico	2	0	0	2
11	Cuba	1	1	3	5
12	Ukraine	1	1	1	3
13	Belarus	1	1	0	2
13	China	1	1	0	2
13	Sweden	1	1	0	2
16	Belgium	1	0	1	2
16	Greece	1	0	1	2
18	Bulgaria	1	0	0	1
18	Canada	1	0	0	1
18	Czech Republic	1	0	0	1
18	India	1	0	0	1
18	Indonesia	1	0	0	1
18	Italy	1	0	0	1
18	Moldova	1	0	0	1
18	New Zealand	1	0	0	1
26	Ireland	0	2	0	2
26	Uganda	0	2	0	2
28	France	0	1	2	3
29	Brazil	0	1	1	2
29	Ecuador	0	1	1	2
29	Norway	0	1	1	2
32	Austria	0	1	0	1
32	Finland*	0	1	0	1
32	Qatar	0	1	0	1
32	Romania	0	1	0	1
32	Turkey	0	1	0	1
37	Switzerland	0	0	4	4
38	Poland	0	0	2	2
39	Bahrain	0	0	1	1
39	Chile	0	0	1	1
39	Colombia	0	0	1	1
39	Guatemala	0	0	1	1
39	Netherlands	0	0	1	1
Totals (43 entries)		45	43	45	133

== Placing table ==
USA won the ranking in the placing table.

Rank	Country	1st place, gold medalist(s)	2nd place, silver medalist(s)	3rd place, bronze medalist(s)	4	5	6	7	8	Points
1	United States	3	8	7	0	1	5	6	2	155
2	Kenya	6	4	1	2	4	0	1	2	112
3	Jamaica	4	5	3	1	1	1	2	0	101
4	Ethiopia	3	2	4	2	5	2	0	0	98
5	Germany	2	0	2	5	3	2	3	3	80
5	Great Britain	3	1	3	1	2	3	4	1	80
7	Japan	2	2	2	3	2	1	2	3	75
8	Australia	2	3	0	2	3	2	3	0	71
9	China	1	1	0	3	2	5	2	0	57
10	France	0	1	2	4	2	1	0	2	52
11	Cuba	1	1	3	2	1	0	0	0	47
12	South Africa	3	0	1	1	1	0	0	1	40
13	Italy	1	0	0	2	2	2	1	4	38
14	Switzerland	0	0	4	0	1	2	0	1	35
15	Uganda	0	2	0	2	0	2	1	0	32
16	Sweden	1	1	0	1	0	1	1	1	26
17	Ukraine	1	1	1	0	0	1	0	1	25
17	Belgium	1	0	1	1	1	0	0	2	25
19	Belarus	1	1	0	1	1	0	0	0	24
19	Poland	0	0	2	0	2	1	0	1	24
21	India	1	0	0	1	1	2	0	0	23
21	Brazil	0	1	1	0	1	1	1	1	23
23	Canada	1	0	0	1	0	1	2	2	22
24	Norway	0	1	1	0	0	1	0	2	18
25	Mexico	2	0	0	0	0	0	0	0	16
26	Finland	0	1	0	0	0	1	2	1	15
26	Ireland	0	2	0	0	0	0	0	1	15
26	Spain	0	0	0	2	0	1	1	0	15
29	Greece	1	0	1	0	0	0	0	0	14
29	Czech Republic	1	0	0	0	1	0	1	0	14
29	New Zealand	1	0	0	0	1	0	0	2	14
32	Turkey	0	1	0	0	1	0	0	2	13
32	Ecuador	0	1	1	0	0	0	0	0	13
32	Romania	0	1	0	0	0	2	0	0	13
35	Qatar	0	1	0	0	1	0	0	0	11
36	Austria	0	1	0	0	0	1	0	0	10
37	Slovakia	0	0	0	1	1	0	0	0	9
38	Hungary	0	0	0	0	1	0	2	0	8
38	Netherlands	0	0	1	0	0	0	1	0	8
38	Bulgaria	1	0	0	0	0	0	0	0	8
38	Moldova	1	0	0	0	0	0	0	0	8
38	Indonesia	1	0	0	0	0	0	0	0	8
43	Chile	0	0	1	0	0	0	0	0	6
43	Eritrea	0	0	0	0	0	1	1	1	6
43	Guatemala	0	0	1	0	0	0	0	0	6
43	Colombia	0	0	1	0	0	0	0	0	6
43	Bahamas	0	0	1	0	0	0	0	0	6
48	Armenia	0	0	0	1	0	0	0	0	5
48	Slovenia	0	0	0	1	0	0	0	0	5
48	Portugal	0	0	0	1	0	0	0	0	5
51	Latvia	0	0	0	0	1	0	0	0	4
51	Serbia	0	0	0	0	0	1	0	1	4
53	Lithuania	0	0	0	0	0	1	0	0	3
54	Algeria	0	0	0	0	0	0	1	0	2
54	Puerto Rico	0	0	0	0	0	0	1	0	2
54	Iran	0	0	0	0	0	0	1	0	2
54	Cyprus	0	0	0	0	0	0	1	0	2
54	Dominican Republic	0	0	0	0	0	0	1	0	2
54	Trinidad and Tobago	0	0	0	0	0	0	1	0	2
54	Morocco	0	0	0	0	0	0	1	0	2
61	Taiwan	0	0	0	0	0	0	0	1	1
61	Sri Lanka	0	0	0	0	0	0	0	1	1
61	Barbados	0	0	0	0	0	0	0	1	1

== Participation ==
The following is a list of participating nations with the number of qualified athletes in brackets. A country without any qualified athlete could enter either one male or one female. A total 156 countries (plus the teams from Authorized Neutral Athletes and Athlete Refugee team) and 1462 athletes were scheduled to compete.

- Algeria (11)
- Authorised Neutral Athletes (9)
- Andorra (1)
- Antigua and Barbuda (2)
- Argentina (4)
- Armenia (2)
- ART (2)
- Aruba (1)
- Australia (54)
- Austria (10)
- Bahamas (12)
- Bahrain (3)
- Bangladesh (1)
- Barbados (6)
- Belarus (12)
- Belgium (14)
- Bermuda (1)
- Bhutan (1)
- Bosnia and Herzegovina (4)
- Bolivia (1)
- Botswana (13)
- Brazil (20)
- British Virgin Islands (1)
- Bulgaria (9)
- Burkina Faso (1)
- Burundi (1)
- Cameroon (1)
- Canada (32)
- Cayman Islands (3)
- Chad (1)
- Chile (4)
- China (35)
- Ivory Coast (1)
- Colombia (8)
- Republic of the Congo (1)
- Costa Rica (2)
- Croatia (5)
- Cuba (13)
- Cyprus (4)
- Czech Republic (24)
- Democratic Republic of the Congo (1)
- Denmark (11)
- Djibouti (1)
- Dominica (1)
- Dominican Republic (7)
- Ecuador (9)
- Egypt (2)
- Eritrea (4)
- El Salvador (1)
- Estonia (3)
- Ethiopia (29)
- Finland (32) Host
- France (44)
- French Polynesia (1)
- Gambia (1)
- Georgia (5)
- Germany (67)
- Ghana (1)
- Gibraltar (1)
- Great Britain (40)
- Greece (19)
- Grenada (1)
- Guatemala (4)
- Guam (1)
- Guyana (2)
- Haiti (1)
- Hong Kong (1)
- Honduras (1)
- Hungary (27)
- Iceland (3)
- India (31)
- Indonesia (2)
- Iran (4)
- Iraq (3)
- Ireland (19)
- Israel (4)
- Italy (55)
- Jamaica (42)
- Jordan (1)
- Japan (47)
- Kazakhstan (2)
- Kenya (27)
- Kosovo (1)
- Kuwait (1)
- Kyrgyzstan (1)
- Latvia (6)
- Lesotho (1)
- Libya (1)
- Lithuania (7)
- Luxembourg (2)
- Macau (1)
- Macedonia (1)
- Madagascar (1)
- Malta (1)
- Maldives (1)
- Mexico (6)
- Moldova (2)
- Monaco (1)
- Montenegro (1)
- Morocco (10)
- Namibia (1)
- Nauru (1)
- Netherlands (14)
- Nicaragua (1)
- New Zealand (11)
- Nigeria (3)
- Norway (10)
- Oman (1)
- Panama (1)
- Papua New Guinea (1)
- Paraguay (1)
- Peru (6)
- Philippines (1)
- Poland (37)
- Portugal (14)
- Puerto Rico (5)
- Qatar (8)
- Romania (17)
- Saint Lucia (1)
- San Marino (1)
- São Tomé and Príncipe (1)
- Saudi Arabia (5)
- Senegal (1)
- Serbia (6)
- Seychelles (1)
- Sierra Leone (1)
- Singapore (1)
- Slovakia (9)
- Slovenia (11)
- South Africa (19)
- South Korea (7)
- South Sudan (1)
- Spain (46)
- Sri Lanka (11)
- Sudan (1)
- Eswatini (1)
- Sweden (17)
- Switzerland (21)
- Chinese Taipei (4)
- Tajikistan (1)
- Tonga (1)
- Trinidad and Tobago (14)
- Tunisia (5)
- Turkey (32)
- Turkmenistan (1)
- Turks and Caicos Islands (1)
- Tuvalu (1)
- Uganda (11)
- Ukraine (34)
- United States (79)
- Uruguay (2)
- Uzbekistan (2)
- Vanuatu (1)
- Venezuela (5)
- Vietnam (2)
- United States Virgin Islands (1)
- Yemen (1)
- Zambia (3)
- Zimbabwe (6)
