= Elsa Leo-Rhynie =

Retired Jamaican academic and university administrator

Elsa Ann Leo-Rhynie OJ (née Fairweather) is a retired Jamaican academic and university administrator who is a professor emerita of the University of West Indies (UWI). She is a former principal and pro-vice-chancellor of its Mona, Jamaica, campus.

== Early life ==
Leo-Rhynie was born at the Victoria Jubilee Hospital in Kingston, Jamaica. She grew up in Saint Andrew and attended the St Andrew High School for Girls. Leo-Rhynie completed her undergraduate education at the University of the West Indies (UWI), graduating with a B.Sc. in botany and zoology. She later completed a graduate diploma in education and a Ph.D. in educational psychology from the same institution. Until 1977, she worked as a high school science teacher, spending periods at Haverstock School (in England) and Meadowbrook High School (in Jamaica).

== Academia ==
In 1977, Leo-Rhynie became a lecturer in educational psychology at the UWI School of Education. In 1987, she was appointed executive director of the Institute of Management and Production. She became the regional coordinator of the Centre for Gender and Development Studies in 1992, and in that capacity was co-author of the Jamaican report to the Fourth World Conference on Women in 1995. Leo-Rhynie was appointed deputy principal of the Mona campus in 1996 and principal in 2006 – the first woman to have held both positions. She became pro-vice-chancellor and chair of undergraduate studies in 2002, and retired in 2007 as a professor emerita.

== Honours ==
Leo-Rhynie was made a Commander of the Order of Distinction in 2000 and inducted into the Order of Jamaica in 2015. In 2013, UWI named a new residence hall in her honour, the Elsa Leo-Rhynie Hall. In July 2017, she was awarded the UWI Chancellor's Medal – the first woman to receive the honour and only the sixth recipient overall.
