= Shunsuke Izumiya =

Japanese hurdler (born 2000)

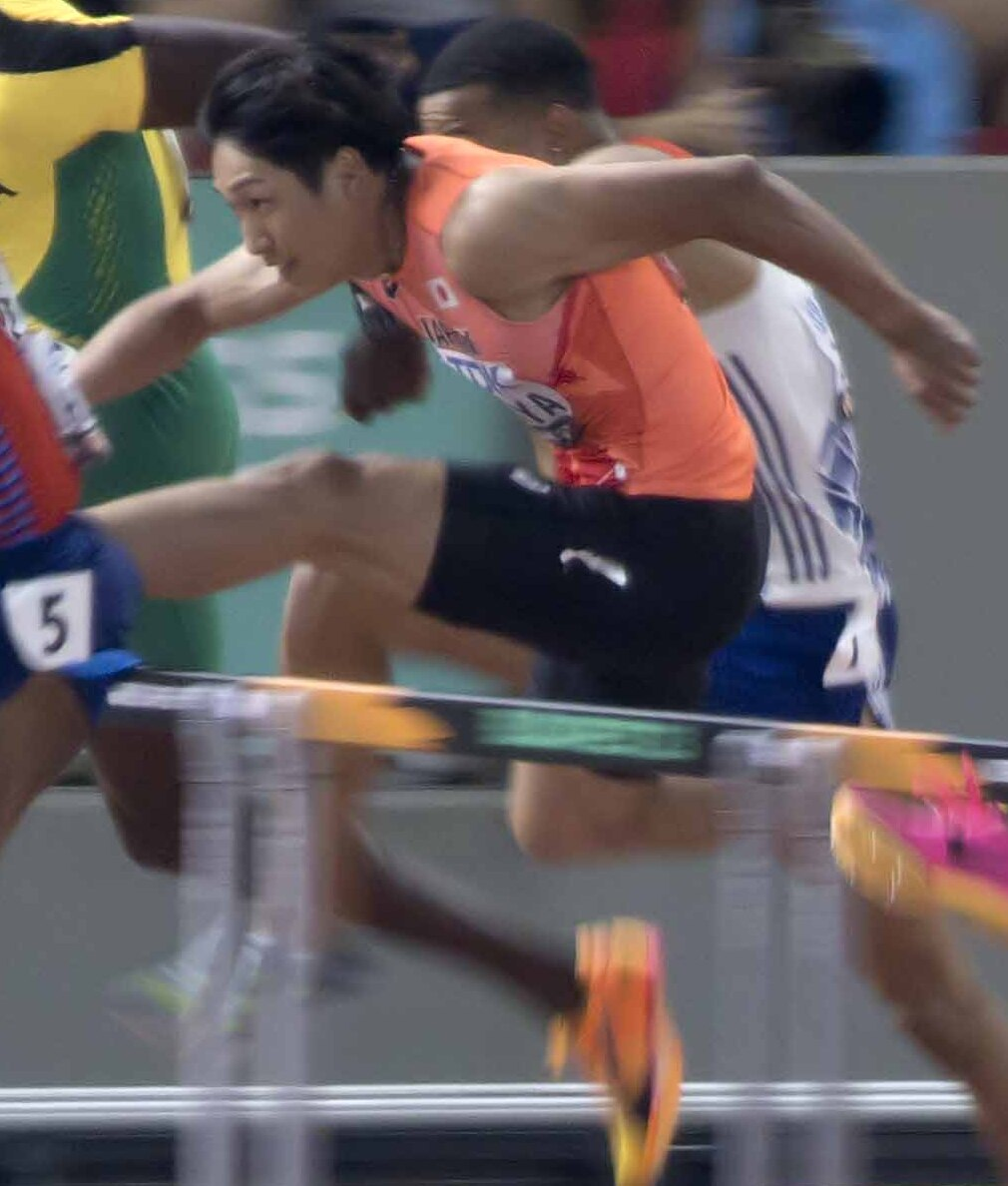
- Shunsuke Izumiya in 2023

Personal information
- Born: 26 January 2000 (age 26) Kanagawa Prefecture, Japan
- Education: Juntendo University

Sport
- Sport: Athletics
- Event: 110 m hurdles

Achievements and titles
- Personal bests: 110 m hurdles: 13.00 (Zagreb, 2026); Long jump: 8.21 m (Nanjing, 2025); 60 m hurdles: 7.50 mi (Osaka, 2021)
Medal record
Men's Athletics
Representing Japan
IAAF World U20 Championships
Bronze medal – third place	2018 Tampere	Men's 110 meters huddles
Universiade
Bronze medal – third place	2019 Napoli	Men's 110 meters huddles

Shunsuke Izumiya (泉谷 駿介, Izumiya Shunsuke; born 26 January 2000) is a Japanese track and field athlete specialising in the high hurdles. He won a bronze medal at the 2018 World U20 Championships. He later also won a bronze medal at the 2019 Summer Universiade.

His personal best in the 110 metres hurdles is 13.00 (+1.2 m/s) set in Zagreb in 2026.

== Biography ==
Izumiya attended Buso High School in Yokohama. He began competing in the decathlon in 2016, winning the Inter-High School Sports Festival the following year. In 2017, he also began competing in the hurdles, running a time of 13.51 (-0.1 m/s) at the National Sports Festival.

In 2018, he won a bronze medal at the Asian Junior Athletics Championships in the triple jump, with a mark of 15.47 metres. Later that year, he won bronze at the World U20 Championships in the 110 metres hurdles.

At the 2021 Japan Indoor Championships, he set a national record in the 60 metres hurdles with a time of 7.50 seconds, a mark later surpassed by Shusei Nomoto at the 2026 World Athletics Indoor Championships.

He had set a NR in 2023 with a time of 13.04 seconds before being broken by Rachid Muratake in the Athlete Night Games in Fukui, Japan in 2025.

Izumiya represented Japan at the 2024 Summer Olympics in the 110 metres hurdles, reaching the semifinals with a time of 13.32.

In 2025, Izumiya finished 4th place at the 2025 World Athletics Indoor Championships in the long jump with a personal best of 8.21 metres. During September 2025, he competed at the 2025 World Athletics Championships, reaching the semifinals but did not finish his race.

In 2026, Izumiya ran a personal best of 13.00 (+1.2 m/s) in Zagreb at the Hanžeković Memorial. On 28 June 2026, he finished second behind Jamal Britt at the 2026 Paris Diamond League, clocking 13.01 (+0.8 m/s).

== International competitions ==
Year	Competition	Venue	Position	Event	Notes
Representing Japan
2018	World U20 Championships	Tampere, Finland	3rd	110 m hurdles (99.0 cm)	13.38
2019	Universiade	Naples, Italy	3rd	110 m hurdles	13.49
2021	Olympic Games	Tokyo, Japan	10th (sf)	110 m hurdles	13.35
2022	World Championships	Eugene, United States	14th (sf)	110 m hurdles	13.42
2023	World Championships	Budapest, Hungary	5th	110 m hurdles	13.19
2024	Olympic Games	Paris, France	9th (sf)	110 m hurdles	13.32
2025	World Indoor Championships	Nanjing, China	4th	Long jump	8.21 m
2025	World Championships	Tokyo, Japan	25th (h)	110 m hurdles	13.52^{1}
2026	World Ultimate Championship	Budapest, Hungary	16th (h)	110 m hurdles	13.85

^{1}Did not finish in the semifinals
