= 2021 World Athletics U20 Championships – Women's 1500 metres =

Women's 1500 metres at the 2021 World Athletics U20 Championships
- Venue: Kasarani Stadium
- Dates: 22 August
- Competitors: 12 from 9 nations
- Winning time: 4:16.07

Medalists
gold medal	Purity Chepkirui	Kenya
silver medal	Diribe Welteji	Ethiopia
bronze medal	Winnie Jemutai	Kenya

The women's 1500 metres at the 2021 World Athletics U20 Championships was held at the Kasarani Stadium on 22 August.

== Records ==
Standing records prior to the 2021 World Athletics U20 Championships
World U20 Record	Lang Yinglai (CHN)	3:51.34	Shanghai, China	18 October 1997
Championship Record	Faith Kipyegon (KEN)	4:04.96	Barcelona, Spain	15 July 2012
World U20 Leading	Diribe Welteji (ETH)	3:58.93	Hengelo, Netherlands	8 June 2021

== Results ==
The final was held on 22 August at 15:50.

Rank	Name	Nationality	Time	Note
1st place, gold medalist(s)	Purity Chepkirui	Kenya	4:16.07	
2nd place, silver medalist(s)	Diribe Welteji	Ethiopia	4:16.39	
3rd place, bronze medalist(s)	Winnie Jemutai	Kenya	4:18.99	
4	Hiwot Mehari	Ethiopia	4:23.23	
5	Meryeme Azrour	Morocco	4:24.39	
6	Mireya Arnedillo	Spain	4:26.45	
7	Talida Sfârghiu	Romania	4:26.68	
8	Ilona Mononen	Finland	4:28.13	
9	Sebah Amar	Eritrea	4:32.00	
10	Nouhaila Rabii	Morocco	4:32.95	
11	Ghania Rezzik	Algeria	4:33.68	
12	Zita Urbán	Hungary	4:35.51	
