= 2018 IAAF World U20 Championships – Men's 100 metres =

Men's 100 metres at the 2018 World U20 Championships
- Venue: Ratina Stadium
- Dates: 10 and 11 July
- Competitors: 47 from 36 nations
- Winning time: 10.18

Medalists
gold medal	Lalu Muhammad Zohri	Indonesia
silver medal	Anthony Schwartz	United States
bronze medal	Eric Harrison	United States

The men's 100 metres at the 2018 IAAF World U20 Championships was held at Ratina Stadium on 10 and 11 July.

== Records ==
Standing records prior to the 2018 IAAF World U20 Championships in Athletics
World Junior Record	Trayvon Bromell (USA)	9.97	Eugene, Oregon, United States	13 June 2014
Championship Record	Adam Gemili (GBR)	10.05	Barcelona, Spain	11 July 2012
World Junior Leading	Anthony Schwartz (USA)	10.09	Albuquerque, New Mexico, United States	2 June 2018

== Results ==
=== Heats ===
Qualification: First 3 of each heat (Q) and the 6 fastest times (q) qualified for the semifinals.

Wind:
Heat 1: +1.1 m/s, Heat 2: +0.6 m/s, Heat 3: +0.5 m/s, Heat 4: -0.3 m/s, Heat 5: -1.0 m/s, Heat 6: +0.2 m/s

Rank	Heat	Name	Nationality	Time	Note
1	1	Lalu Muhammad Zohri	Indonesia	10.30	Q
2	6	Michael Stephens	Jamaica	10.30	Q
3	3	Chad Miller	Great Britain	10.33	Q
4	3	Michael Bentley	Jamaica	10.34	Q
5	6	Joel Johnson	Bahamas	10.34	Q
6	2	Dominic Ashwell	Great Britain	10.36	Q
7	3	Satoru Fukushima	Japan	10.37	Q
8	4	Eric Harrison	United States	10.39	Q
9	6	Anthony Schwartz	United States	10.40	Q
10	2	Jake Doran	Australia	10.41	Q
11	3	Rikkoi Brathwaite	British Virgin Islands	10.44	q
12	4	Marvin Schulte	Germany	10.44	Q
13	5	Samuel Purola	Finland	10.47	Q
14	5	Henrik Larsson	Sweden	10.49	Q
15	1	Daisuke Miyamoto	Japan	10.50	Q
16	5	Thembo Monareng	South Africa	10.52	Q
17	2	Luis Brandner	Germany	10.52	Q
18	2	Gal Arad	Israel	10.56	q
19	6	Tyrell Edwards	Trinidad and Tobago	10.57	q
20	6	Lorenzo Paissan	Italy	10.57	q
21	3	Sergio López	Spain	10.59	q
22	2	Vasyl Makukh	Ukraine	10.62	q
23	5	Shin Min-kyu	South Korea	10.62	
24	4	Riku Illukka	Finland	10.65	Q
25	1	Isayah Boers	Netherlands	10.66	Q
26	4	Joshua Azzopardi	Australia	10.66	
27	1	Joan Martínez	Spain	10.67	
28	2	Simang'aliso Ndhlovu	Zambia	10.68	
29	1	Timothy Frederick	Trinidad and Tobago	10.69	
30	3	Thando Dlodlo	South Africa	10.70	
31	1	Adrian Curry	Bahamas	10.70	
32	5	Jeremy Estrada	Puerto Rico	10.75	
33	5	Štepán Hampl	Czech Republic	10.78	
34	6	Danelson Mahautiere	Dominica	10.79	
35	6	Antonio Ivanov	Bulgaria	10.84	
36	3	Mateo Vargas	Paraguay	10.89	
37	2	Gerom Samael Solis	Honduras	10.94	
38	5	Jonah Harris	Nauru	11.11	
39	2	Tevita Potesio Pone	Tonga	11.16	
40	4	Moutasim Al Shekaili	Oman	11.19	
41	1	Rahmie Sharif	Jordan	11.33	
42	5	Manoka John	Papua New Guinea	11.52	
43	6	Jojo Iav	Vanuatu	11.63	
44	1	Joseph Aguon	Guam	11.69	
45	4	Mipham Yoezer Gurung	Bhutan	12.05	
46	3	Shirgeldi Utomyshov	Turkmenistan	13.07	
	4	Abdu Ahmed Marzouq	Saudi Arabia	DQ	
	4	Enoch Adegoke	Nigeria	DNS	

=== Semifinals ===
Qualification: First 2 of each semifinal (Q) and the 2 fastest times (q) qualified for the final.

Wind:
Semifinal 1: +1.0 m/s, Semifinal 2: +1.4 m/s, Semifinal 3: +0.1 m/s

Rank	Heat	Name	Nationality	Time	Not
1	1	Anthony Schwartz	United States	10.19	Q
2	2	Henrik Larsson	Sweden	10.22	Q, NU20R
3	2	Michael Stephens	Jamaica	10.22	Q, PB
4	1	Lalu Muhammad Zohri	Indonesia	10.24	Q, NU20R
5	2	Dominic Ashwell	Great Britain	10.28	q, PB
6	1	Daisuke Miyamoto	Japan	10.33	q
7	2	Satoru Fukushima	Japan	10.33	PB
8	3	Eric Harrison	United States	10.36	Q
9	3	Thembo Monareng	South Africa	10.36	Q
10	3	Chad Miller	Great Britain	10.38	
11	1	Rikkoi Brathwaite	British Virgin Islands	10.44	SB
12	3	Jake Doran	Australia	10.47	
13	2	Gal Arad	Israel	10.53	
14	2	Sergio López	Spain	10.53	SB
15	2	Luis Brandner	Germany	10.54	
16	1	Isayah Boers	Netherlands	10.55	
17	3	Tyrell Edwards	Trinidad and Tobago	10.55	
18	3	Riku Illukka	Finland	10.67	
19	3	Lorenzo Paissan	Italy	10.73	
	1	Vasyl Makukh	Ukraine	DNF	
	3	Marvin Schulte	Germany	DQ	
	1	Samuel Purola	Finland	DNS	
	1	Michael Bentley	Jamaica	DNS	
	2	Joel Johnson	Bahamas	DNS	

=== Final ===
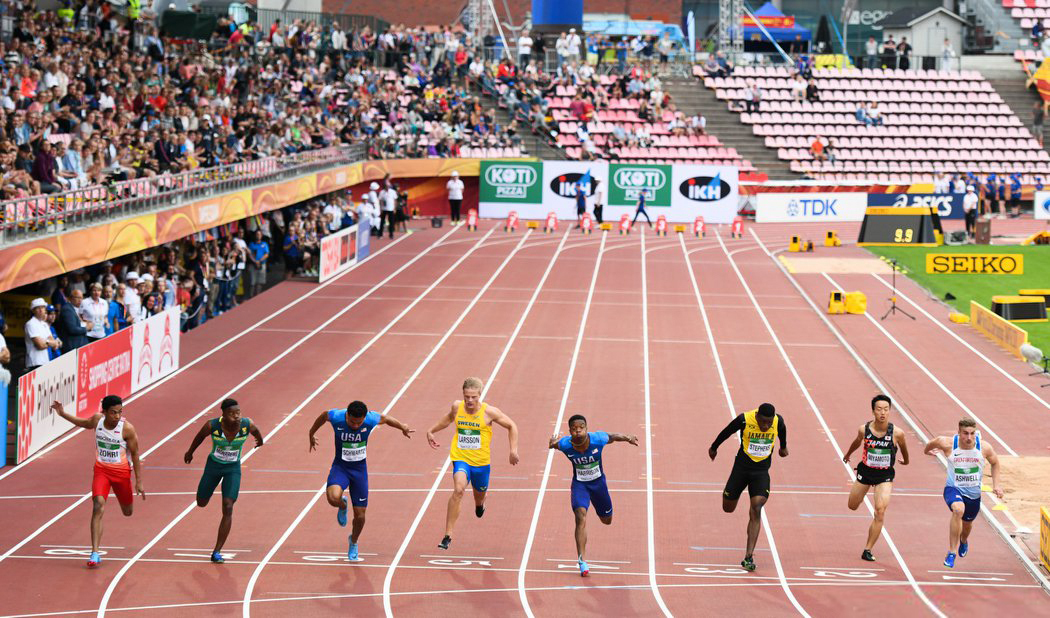
The final

Wind: +1.2 m/s

Rank	Lane	Name	Nationality	Time	Note
1st place, gold medalist(s)	8	Lalu Muhammad Zohri	Indonesia	10.18	NU20R
2nd place, silver medalist(s)	6	Anthony Schwartz	United States	10.22(.211)	
3rd place, bronze medalist(s)	4	Eric Harrison	United States	10.22(.220)	PB
4	7	Thembo Monareng	South Africa	10.23	
5	1	Dominic Ashwell	Great Britain	10.25	PB
6	5	Henrik Larsson	Sweden	10.28	
7	3	Michael Stephens	Jamaica	10.31	
8	2	Daisuke Miyamoto	Japan	10.43	
