= 2000 metres steeplechase =

Distance for the steeplechase in track and field

Athletics 2000 Metres Steeplechase

World records
- Men: (France) Mahiedine Mekhissi-Benabbad 5:10.68 (2010)
- Women: (Germany) Gesa-Felicitas Krause 5:52.80 (2019)

The 2000 metres steeplechase is a rarely run senior athletics and a standard youth athletics event for the steeplechase in track and field. The event was part of the athletics programme for boys and girls at the IAAF World Youth Championships in Athletics. It is an obstacle race over the distance of 2000 metres, and derives its name from the horse racing steeplechase.

== All-time top 25 ==
- i = indoor performance
- A = affected by altitude

=== Men ===
- Correct as of 5 June 2026.

Rank	Time	Athlete	Nation	Date	Place	Ref.
1	5:10.68	Mahiedine Mekhissi-Benabbad	France	30 June 2010	Reims	
2	5:13.47	Bouabdellah Tahri	France	25 June 2010	Tomblaine	
3	5:13.77 i	Paul Kipsiele Koech	Kenya	13 February 2011	Ghent	
4	5:14.06	Soufiane El Bakkali	Morocco	11 September 2022	Zagreb	
5	5:14.43	Julius Kariuki	Kenya	21 August 1990	Rovereto	
6	5:14.53	Saif Saaeed Shaheen	Qatar	13 May 2005	Doha	
7	5:16.22	Philip Barkutwo	Kenya	21 August 1990	Rovereto	
8	5:16.46	Wesley Kiprotich	Kenya	13 May 2005	Doha	
9	5:16.85	Eliud Barnegetuny	Kenya	13 June 1995	Parma	
10	5:18.28	Richard Kosgei	Kenya	13 June 1995	Parma	
11	5:18.29	Karl Bebendorf	Germany	31 May 2026	Dresden	
12	5:18.36	Alessandro Lambruschini	Italy	12 September 1989	Verona	
13	5:18.38	Azzedine Brahmi	Algeria	17 June 1992	Verona	
14	5:18.51	John Langat	Kenya	29 August 2001	Rovereto	
15	5:18.60	Stanley Kibiwott	Kenya	29 August 2001	Rovereto	
16	5:18.65	Antonio David Jiménez	Spain	7 June 2005	Huelva	
17	5:18.67	Benjamin Kigen	Kenya	2 June 2017	Andujar	
18	5:19.21	Joseph Keter	Kenya	23 August 1995	Rovereto	
19	5:19.68	Samson Obwocha	Kenya	19 July 1986	Birmingham	
19	5:19.68	Duncan Hamilton	United States	3 September 2024	Copenhagen	
21	5:19.78	Paul Malakwen Kosgei	Kenya	20 June 1998	La Spezia	
22	5:19.86	Mark Rowland	Great Britain	28 August 1988	London	
23	5:19.96	Roba Gari	Ethiopia	19 May 2007	Herrera	
24	5:19.99	Meresa Kahsay	Ethiopia	12 July 2013	Donetsk	
25	5:20.00	Krzysztof Wesolowski	Poland	28 June 1984	Oslo	
25	5:20.00 +	Lawrence Kemboi	Kenya	6 May 2016	Doha	

==== Notes ====
Below is a list of all other times equal or superior to 5:20.00:

- Bouabdellah Tahri also ran 5:15.36 (2009), 5:15.96 (2002), 5:17.19 (2007), 5:19.33 (2001).
- Paul Kipsiele Koech also ran 5:17.04 i (2010).
- John Langat also ran 5:18.61 (2001).
- Eliud Barngetuny also ran 5:18.67 (1995).
- Alessandro Lambruschini also ran 5:18.68 (1990), 5:18.88 (1992), 5:19.44 (1992).
- Richard Kosgei also ran 5:19.05 (1995).

=== Women ===
- Correct as of July 2025.

Rank	Time	Athlete	Nation	Date	Place	Ref.
1	5:45.09 i	Winfred Yavi	Bahrain	9 February 2021	Liévin	
2	5:47.42	Beatrice Chepkoech	Kenya	10 September 2023	Zagreb	
3	5:47.79 i	Maruša Mišmaš	Slovenia	19 February 2020	Liévin	
4	5:52.80	Gesa-Felicitas Krause	Germany	1 September 2019	Berlin	
5	5:52.92	Winnie Jemutai	Kenya	10 September 2023	Zagreb	
6	5:54.16+	Ruth Jebet	Bahrain	27 August 2016	Saint-Denis	
7	5:56.79	Luiza Gega	Albania	10 September 2023	Zagreb	
8	5:57.76	Ley Meyer	Germany	27 July 2025	Berlin	
9	6:00.31 i	Mercy Chepkurui	Kenya	19 February 2020	Liévin	
10	6:00.50	Olivia Gürth	Germany	1 September 2024	Berlin	
11	6:01.27 i	Roseline Chepngetich	Kenya	19 February 2020	Liévin	
12	6:01.47	Tatiane Raquel da Silva	Brazil	18 June 2023	Poznań	
13	6:02.04	Celestine Biwot	Kenya	18 June 2023	Poznań	
14	6:02.16	Virginia Nyambura	Kenya	6 September 2015	Berlin	
15	6:03.38	Wioletta Frankiewicz	Poland	15 July 2006	Gdańsk	
16	6:04.05	Maroua Bouziani	Tunisia	12 May 2023	Toulon	
17	6:04.46	Dorcus Inzikuru	Uganda	1 June 2005	Milano	
18	6:04.79	Jolanda Kallabis	Germany	27 July 2025	Berlin	
19	6:05.53	Eline Dalemans	Belgium	27 July 2025	Berlin	
20	6:06.85	Aneta Konieczek	Poland	18 June 2023	Poznań	
21	6:07.01	Fancy Cherono	Kenya	1 September 2019	Berlin	
22	6:09.48	Viktória Wagner-Gyürkés	Hungary	1 September 2019	Berlin	
22	6:09.48	Genevieve Gregson	Australia	1 September 2019	Berlin	
24	6:09.62	Kinga Krôlik	Poland	1 September 2024	Berlin	
25	6:09.85	Joana Soares	Portugal	25 July 2020	Ribeira Brava	

==== Notes ====
Below is a list of all other times equal or superior to 6:09.85:

- Maruša Mišmaš-Zrimsek also run 5:48.71i (2021), 5:53.38 (2023), 5:56.28 (2020).
- Winfred Yavi also ran 5:48.68i (2020), 5:56.83 (2019).
- Gesa-Felicitas Krause also ran 5:56.71 (2024), 6:04.20 (2015), 6:09.46 (2016).
- Luiza Gega also ran 6:00.07 (2019).
- Beatrice Chepkoech also ran 6:02.47 (2015).
- Winnie Jemutai also ran 6:02.61 (2023).
- Jolanda Kallabis also ran 6:07.72 (2022).

== See also ==
- 3000 metres steeplechase
