= St Andrew High School =

Public school in Kingston, Jamaica

Location
- Kingston; Jamaica
- 18°00′35″N 76°47′43″W

Information
- Type: Public school (government funded)
- Motto: Life More Abundant
- Patron saint: Saint Andrew
- Established: September 21, 1925; 100 years ago
- School code: 02062
- Chairperson: Radley Reid
- Principal: Keeva Ingram
- Years offered: 7–13
- Gender: all-female
- Age range: 10–19
- Enrolment: 1,558 (2018)
- Student to teacher ratio: 17:1
- Language: English
- Houses: Anderson; Arc; Cavell; Darling; Gartshore; Stockhausen
Colours
Dubonnet, Egyptian Grey,
- Sports: Hockey, track and field, volleyball, badminton, table tennis, swimming, netball, basketball
- Website: sahs.edu.jm

St Andrew High School (also known as St Andrew High School for Girls) is an all-girls high school in Saint Andrew, Jamaica. The school was founded on September 21, 1925.

== History ==
=== 1925–1929 ===
St Andrew High School was founded on September 21, 1925, through a partnership between the Presbyterian Church and the Wesleyan Synod of Jamaica. A fund of £6,000 was initially established to found the Jamaica High School for Girls, a fee-paying institution. Under the terms of the agreement, the school enrolled both boarders and day girls and was to be located near Kingston. In early 1925, the parties secured the former Cecelio Lodge House on eight acres of land—with gardens, tennis courts and a hockey field—from Kingston businessman Cecil Vernon Lindo. The house was refurbished, and dormitories, classrooms and staff rooms were added. On September 21, 1925, the Jamaica High School for Girls opened with 21 scholars (10 "day girls" and 11 "boarders"). September 21 continues to be celebrated annually as the school's Founder's Day. The first headmistress was Miss Jenny Gartshore, who served for only one term. Her sister, Miss Margaret Gartshore, assumed the position and served the school for 31 years.

=== 1929–1957 ===
In October 1929, the school qualified to become a government grant-aided secondary school. There were 153 students, of whom 51 were boarders. The Jamaica Schools' Commission recommended that the name be changed to St. Andrew High School for Girls. In 1940, the school had 270 students—68 boarders and 202 daytime attendees. A building and expansion programme was initiated, which would take several years to complete and was estimated to cost £6,000. The school population changed from exclusively fee-paying students to include students who had gained "free" or "grant-aided" places as a result of their performance in the Common Entrance Examination.

=== 1957–1968 ===
In 1957, Miss Mary Dawson became the second principal of the school. In 1958, the Common Entrance Examination was introduced, resulting in an increase in government grant-in-aid to cover the tuition fees for those students awarded "free places" and "grant-aided places". In the same year, St. Andrew High School separated into two schools - St. Andrew High School (a secondary education institution) and St. Andrew Preparatory School for children aged 4 to 11 years. Principal Dawson spearheaded the development of science, initiating the teaching of physics by arranging for girls to attend classes at Calabar High School until the school's physics lab was ready in 1963. In 1965, the school closed its boarding facilities to create space for additional classrooms to facilitate newly introduced subjects—craft, commercial and home economics.

=== 1968–present ===
In 1968, Mrs. Fay Saunders became the first Jamaican headmistress of the school. In 1974, she resigned to take up an appointment as Senator and Parliamentary Secretary in the Ministry of Education. Also in 1974, Miss Joan Reader became the second Jamaican headmistress of the school. She oversaw the implementation of the second shift in 1978—a Ministry of Education initiative to cope with a burgeoning post-independence school population, and an increasing expectation that secondary education would be provided for the entire 12–16 year old cohort of the population.

== House system ==
Upon initial enrollment in the school, each student is assigned to one of six houses. Originally there were four houses: Anderson (named after Elizabeth Garrett Anderson, the first woman to qualify as a physician and surgeon in Britain); Arc (named for the heroine and saint, Joan of Arc), Cavell (named for Edith Cavell, a British World War I nurse), and Darling (named for Grace Darling, the daughter of a lighthouse keeper who helped to rescue sailors from a shipwreck in 1838). In 1973, two more houses were added for a total of six: Gartshore (named after Margaret Gartshore, the first headmistress); and Stockhausen (named after Doris Stockhausen, the first vice-principal).

== Enrollment ==
The school's official capacity is 1,600 students. As of the 2018–2019 academic year, there were 1,558 students enrolled with a staff complement of ninety-five (95) teachers, including a guidance counselor and a school nurse.

School Profile
School Year	Enrollment	Student-Teacher Ratio
2018–2019	1,558	17:1
2017–2018	1,571	19:1
2016–2017	1,545	22:1
2015–2016	1,564	22:1
2014–2015	1,567	21:1
2013–2014	1,520	21:1
2012–2013	1,550	21:1

== Headmistresses and principals ==
- Miss Jenny Gartshore (1925)
- Miss Margaret Gartshore (1925-1957)
- Miss Mary Dawson (1957-1968)
- Mrs Fay Saunders (1968-1974)
- Miss Joan Reader (1974-1988)
- Mrs Dahlia Mills-Repole (1989-2000)
- Mrs Sharon Reid (2000-2019)
- Mrs Keeva Ingram (2019–present)

== Notable alumnae ==
- Michelle Cliff, Jamaican-American author
- Nicole Dennis-Benn, Jamaican novelist
- Parisa Fitz-Henley, Jamaican-born actress
- Barbara Gloudon, Jamaican journalist, author, and playwright
- Maxine Henry-Wilson, Jamaican educator and politician
- Janielle Josephs, Jamaican athlete
- Elsa Leo-Rhynie, Jamaican academic and university administrator
- Hilary Phillips, Jamaican attorney-at-law and magistrate. Judge of the Court of Appeal
- Yendi Phillips, Jamaican TV host, model and beauty queen
- Megan Tapper, 100m hurdles Olympic bronze medalist
- Sylvia Wynter, Jamaican novelist and dramatist
