= Shae Anderson =

American athlete (born 1999)

Personal information
- Full name: Shae Lynn Anderson
- Born: April 7, 1999 (age 27)
- Height: 5 ft 7 in (170 cm)

Sport
- Country: United States
- Sport: Track and field
- Events: 200 m, 400 m
- College team: UCLA Bruins

Achievements and titles
- Personal bests: 100 m: 11.50 (Los Angeles 2021); 200 m: 22.96 (Tucson 2021); 400 m: 50.84 (Eugene 2021)

Shae Lynn Anderson (born April 7, 1999) is an American athlete who competes primarily in the 400 m.

From Norco, California, she studied at the University of Oregon and the University of California, Los Angeles and in 2020 broke the UCLA indoor 400 m record twice and helping the women's 4 × 400 m team to a UCLA indoor record.

She was a 2018 IAAF World U20 Championships gold medalist in the 4 × 400 m.

At the 2020 United States Olympic Trials (track and field) held in Eugene, Oregon, Anderson reached the final of the 400 m and qualified for the relay pool of the 4 × 400 m relay at the 2020 Summer Games.
