= Burnt Forest =

Human settlement in Uasin Gishu County, Kenya

- Location in Kenya
- Coordinates: 00°53′00″N 35°07′00″E
- Country: Kenya
- County: Uasin Gishu County
- Time zone: UTC+3 (EAT)

Burnt Forest is a town in Uasin Gishu County, Kenya.

== History ==
In the 1960s, forested land in what is now the town of Burnt Forest was cleared to make way for farms.

The town has suffered ethnic clashes after the 1992, 1997 and 2007 Kenyan presidential elections.
