= Diribe Welteji =

Ethiopian middle-distance runner

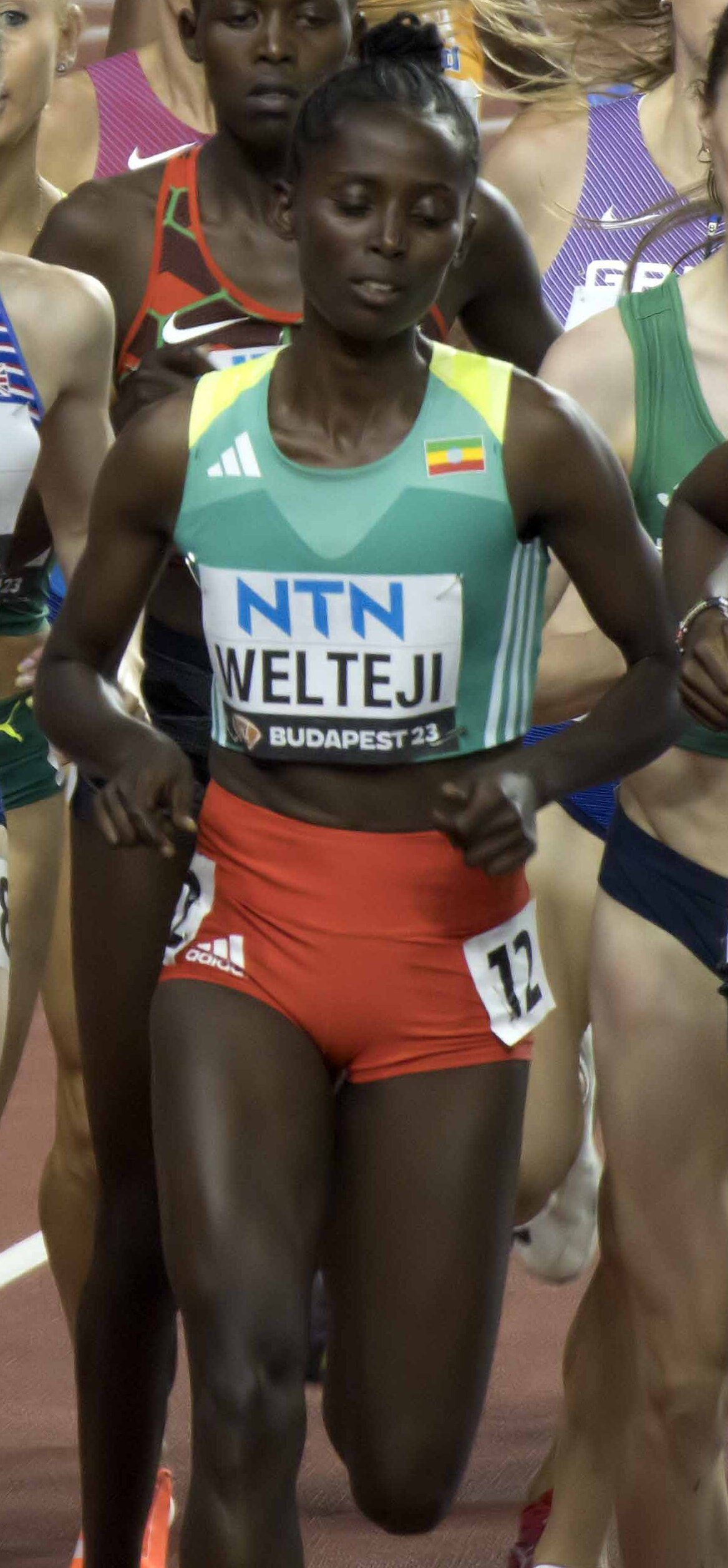
- Diribe Welteji in 2023

Personal information
- Nationality: Ethiopian
- Born: Diribe Welteji Kejelcha; 13 May 2002 (age 24) West Shewa Zone, Oromia, Ethiopia

Sport
- Sport: Track and Field
- Events: 800 metres 1500 metres

Achievements and titles
- Personal bests: 800m: 1:57.02 (Eugene, 2022); 1500m: 3:52.75 (Paris, 2024); 3000m: 8:21.50 (Lausanne, 2024)
Medal record
Women's athletics
Representing Ethiopia
World Championships
Silver medal – second place	2023 Budapest	1500 m
World Indoor Championships
Disqualified	2025 Nanjing	1500 m
World Road Running Championships
Gold medal – first place	2023 Riga	1 mile
World U20 Championships
Gold medal – first place	2018 Tampere	800 m
Silver medal – second place	2021 Nairobi	1500 m
African U20 Championships
Gold medal – first place	2019 Abidjan	1500 m

Diribe Welteji Kejelcha (born 13 May 2002) is an Ethiopian middle-distance runner. She won the silver medal in the 1500 metres at the 2023 World Championships and placed fourth in the 800 metres at the 2022 World Championships.

At age 16, Welteji won the 800 m at the 2018 World U20 Championships, breaking the championship record in the process. She took silver for the 1500 metres at the 2021 World U20 Championships.

In February 2026, Welteji received a two-year ban in relation for failing to provide drug sample, without justification, the previous year. The Court of Arbitration for Sport backdated her ban to September 2025 and disqualified all results from 25 February 2025, including her silver medal in the 1500 m at the 2025 World Indoor Championships.

== Career ==
A 16-year-old Diribe Welteji won the gold medal for the 800 m event at the 2018 World Under-20 Championships in Tampere, where she also competed in the women's 4 × 400 m relay without reaching the final, but achieving an Ethiopian junior record.

In 2019, she won a gold in the 1500 metres at the African U20 Championships, finished sixth in the 800 m event at the African Games in Rabat, and was eliminated in the semi-finals of the 800 m event at the Doha World Championships.

The 19-year-old competed without success in the women's 1500 m at the delayed 2020 Tokyo Olympics in August 2021, but the same month took silver in this event at the World U20 Championships held in Nairobi.

Welteji placed fourth in the 800 m at the 2022 World Athletics Championships in Eugene, Oregon in July with a time of 1:57.02. In August, she won her first Diamond League meeting with a 1500 m victory, beating her esteemed compatriot Gudaf Tsegay at the Kamila Skolimowska Memorial in Chorzów, Poland. Welteji improved her personal best by more than two seconds and set a meet record with 3:56.91.

On 1 October 2023, Welteji broke the 1 mile women's road record by running 4:20.98 in Riga at the World Athletics Road Running Championships.

In December 2024, it was announced that she had signed up for the inaugural season of the Michael Johnson founded Grand Slam Track.

In May 2025, the Ethiopia National Anti-Doping Office (ETH-NADO) issued an anti-doping rule violation charge against Welteji for "allegedly refusing to provide a sample for an out-of-competition doping control without any justification". Although an ETH-NADO hearing panel held in August 2025 found that no ADRV had been committed, the Athletics Integrity Unit filed an appeal to the Court of Arbitration for Sport (CAS) in early September. On 12 September, CAS declared that Welteji was ineligible to compete in the 2025 World Athletics Championships in Tokyo and would remain suspended during the CAS arbitration procedure. The CAS released its decision in February 2026, handing Weltiji a two-year ban.

== Achievements ==
=== International competitions ===
Representing Ethiopia
Year	Competition	Venue	Position	Event	Time
2018	World U20 Championships	Tampere, Finland	1st	800 m	1:59.74 WU20L CR
2018	World U20 Championships	Tampere, Finland	13th (h)	4 × 400 m relay	3:39.29 NU20R
2019	African U20 Championships	Abidjan, Ivory Coast	1st	1500 m	4:11.59
2019	African Games	Rabat, Morocco	6th	800 m	2:04.20
2019	World Championships	Doha, Qatar	18th (sf)	800 m	2:02.69
2021	Olympic Games	Tokyo, Japan	35th (h)	1500 m	4:10.25
2021	World U20 Championships	Nairobi, Kenya	2nd	1500 m	4:16.39
2022	World Championships	Eugene, OR, United States	4th	800 m	1:57.02 PB
2023	World Championships	Budapest, Hungary	2nd	1500 m	3:55.69
2023	World Athletics Road Running Championships	Riga, Latvia	1st	Road mile	4:20.98 WR
2024	World Indoor Championships	Glasgow, United Kingdom	5th	1500 m	4:03.82
2024	Olympic Games	Paris, France	4th	1500 m	3:52.75
2025	World Indoor Championships	Nanjing, China	DQ	1500 m	3:59.30

=== Circuit performances ===
Grand Slam Track results
Slam	Race group	Event	Pl.	Time	Prize money
2025 Kingston Slam	Short distance	800 m	2nd	1:58.29	US$100,000
2025 Kingston Slam	Short distance	1500 m	1st	4:04.51	US$100,000
2025 Miami Slam	Short distance	1500 m	3rd	4:07.46	US$25,000
2025 Miami Slam	Short distance	800 m	4th	1:59.94	US$25,000
2025 Philadelphia Slam	Short distance	1500 m	1st	3:58.04	US$100,000
2025 Philadelphia Slam	Short distance	800 m	1st	1:58.94	US$100,000

==== Wins and titles ====
- Diamond League
  - 2022: Chorzów Kamila Skolimowska Memorial (1500m, MR PB)

=== Personal bests ===
- 800 metres – 1:57.02 (Eugene, OR July 2022)
- 1500 metres – 3:53.93 (Eugene, OR September 2023)
  - 3000 metres indoor – 8:33.44 (Val-de-Reuil February 2023)
