= Marvin Schulte =

German sprinter (born 1999)

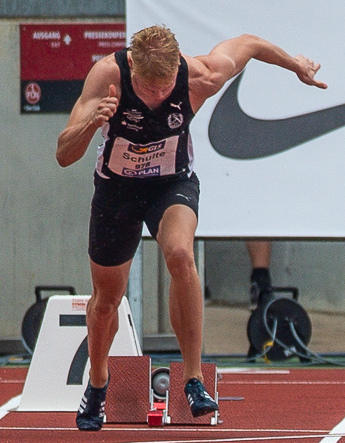
- Schulte in 2018

Personal information
- Born: 19 February 1999 (age 27)

Sport
- Sport: Athletics
- Event: Sprint

Achievements and titles
- Personal bests: 60 m: 6.62 (2025); 100 m: 10.18 (2019); 200 m: 21.20 (2022)
Medal record
Men's athletics
Representing Germany
European Championships
Silver medal – second place	2026 Birmingham	4 × 100 m relay
World Relays
Bronze medal – third place	2026 Gaborone	4 × 100 m relay
European U23 Championships
Gold medal – first place	2019 Gävle	4 × 100 m relay
World U20 Championships
Bronze medal – third place	2018 Tampere	4 × 100 m
European Youth Championships
Gold medal – first place	2016 Tbilisi	100 m

Marvin Schulte (born 19 February 1999) is a German sprinter. He was won the German Athletics Championships over 100 metres and represented Germany at the World Athletics Championships. He was European U18 Champion over 100 metres in 2016.

== Biography ==
From Leipzig, he started in athletics from a young age at SV Lindenau in the city. He went on to become a member of LAZ Leipzig and SC DHfK Leipzig. He started concentrating on sprinting in 2015. He subsequently won the gold medal in the 100 metres at the 2016 European Athletics U18 Championships in Tbilisi, Georgia.

He competed for Germany at the 2018 IAAF World U20 Championships in Tampere, Finland, as the German 4 × 100 metres team equaled the German U20 record in the preliminary round and won the bronze medal in the final.

In 2019, he won the German U23 Championships over 100 metres, running a personal best 10.18 seconds in the semi-final, and a wind-assisted 10.12 seconds in the final. He was a gold medalist in the 4 × 100 metres at the 2019 European Athletics U23 Championships in Gävle, Sweden, where he also placed fifth in the final of the 100 metres. He went on to represent the senior Germany team in the sprint relay at the 2019 World Athletics Championships in Doha at the age of 20 years-old.

Schulte won the German Athletics Championships title over 100 metres in Braunschweig in 2021, running 10.19 seconds in the final. That year, he was selected for the delayed 2020 Olympic Games but was unable to compete because of illness on the day of the competition.

He was a member of the German 4 × 100 metres relay team alongside Julian Wagner, Joshua Hartmann and Yannick Wolf that won the 2023 European Athletics Team Championships First Division in Silesia, Poland, winning ahead of the reigning Olympic champions Italy and reigning European champions Great Britain.

He was a member of the German 4 × 100 metres relay team which placed second behind the Netherlands at the 2025 European Team Championships in Madrid, Spain, in June 2025, with Wagner, Kevin Kranz and Lucas Ansah-Peprah. He was selected for the German team for the 2025 World Athletics Championships in Tokyo, Japan. He ran as a member or the German team which qualified for the final of the men's 4 × 100 metres, before placing fifth overall.

Part of the Germany squad for the 4 × 100 metres relay at the 2026 World Athletics Relays in Gaborone, Botswana, he ran in the men's team which set a national record 37.67 seconds to in the qualification round. The team won the bronze medal in the final the following day. In August 2026, he won a silver medal in the 2026 European Athletics Championships in the men's 4 × 100 metres relay in Birmingham, England.
