= Anthony Schwartz =

American sprinter and football player (born 2000)

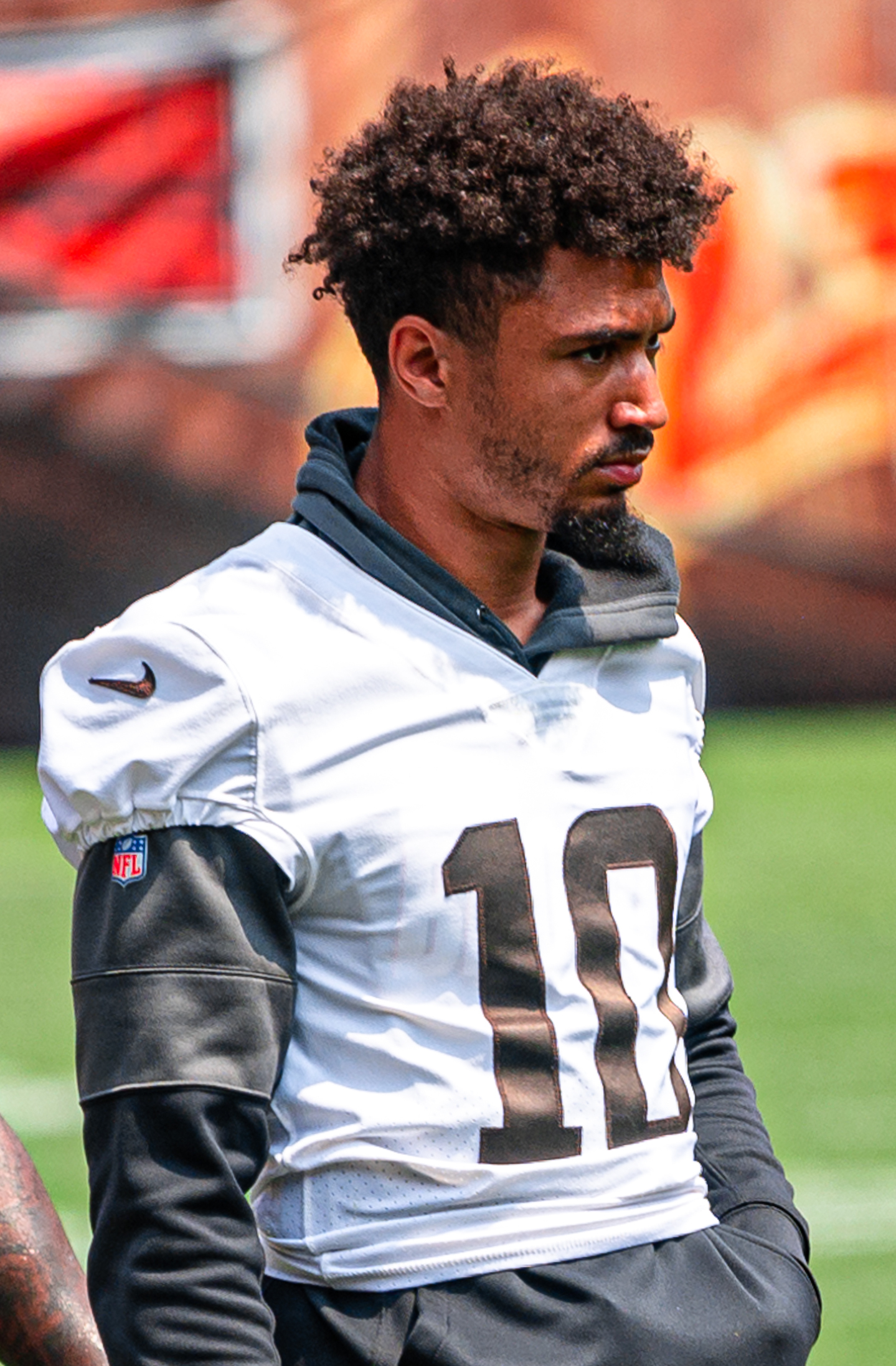
- Schwartz with the Cleveland Browns in 2021
- Born: September 5, 2000 (age 26); Pembroke Pines, Florida, U.S.
- Education: Auburn University; American Heritage School
- Football career

Profile
- Position: Wide receiver

Personal information
- Listed height: 6 ft 0 in (1.83 m)
- Listed weight: 195 lb (88 kg)

Career information
- College: Auburn (2018–2020)
- NFL draft: 2021: 3rd round, 91st overall pick

Career history
- Cleveland Browns (2021–2023); Miami Dolphins (2023–2024)

Career NFL statistics as of 2023
- Receptions: 14
- Receiving yards: 186
- Receiving touchdowns: 1
- Rushing yards: 96
- Rushing touchdowns: 1
- Stats at Pro Football Reference
- Sports career
- Country: United States
- Sport: Track and Field
- Event: Sprints

Sports achievements and titles
- Personal bests: Outdoor; 100 m: 10.09 (Albuquerque 2018); 200 m: 20.47 (Miami 2018); Indoor; 60 m: 6.59i (New York City 2018)
Medal record
Men's athletics
Representing the United States
IAAF World U20 Championships
Gold medal – first place	2018 Tampere	4×100 m
Silver medal – second place	2018 Tampere	100 m
Pan American U20 Athletics Championships
Gold medal – first place	2017 Trujilo	4×100 m

Anthony Schwartz (born September 5, 2000) is an American professional football player who was a wide receiver in the National Football League (NFL). He played college football for the Auburn Tigers. A world-class sprinter during his high school years, Schwartz held the world under-18 best in the 100 meters between 2017 and 2022.

== Amateur career ==
As a 16-year old track athlete in high school, Schwartz set a new World Youth Best of 10.15 seconds over 100 meters on March 31, 2017, which was a record he held until it was beaten by 16-year old Puripol Boonson in 2022.

A native of Pembroke Pines, Florida, Schwartz also played football in high school, and was ranked the No. 22 prospect in the state by Rivals.com. On February 7, 2018, Schwartz signed a national letter of intent to play football and run track at Auburn University. He played football for the Tigers during the 2018 season, including their appearance in the 2018 Music City Bowl, where he scored a second-quarter touchdown.

=== Track statistics ===
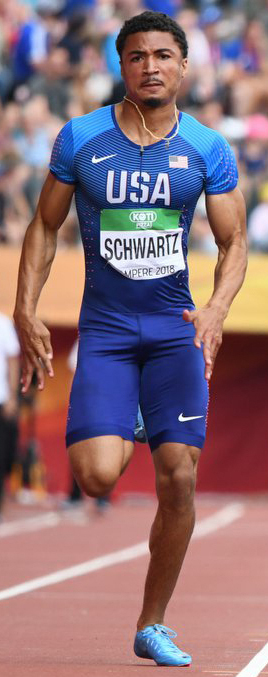
Schwartz at the 2018 IAAF World U20 Championships

==== Personal bests ====
Event	Time (s)	Wind (m/s)	Competition	Venue	Date	Notes
60 meters	6.59	n/a	New Balance Nationals Indoor	Boston, Massachusetts	March 11, 2018	U20 WL
100 meters	10.09	+0.9	Great Southwest Classic	Albuquerque, New Mexico	June 2, 2018	A U20 WL
100 meters	10.07	+2.5	FHSAA State Finals	Jacksonville, Florida	May 5, 2018	w
200 meters	20.47	+1.3	Sam Burley Hall of Fame Invitational	Miami, Florida	March 3, 2018	
200 meters	20.41	+2.8	FHSAA State Finals	Jacksonville, Florida	May 5, 2018	w
4 × 100 meters relay	38.88	n/a	World U20 Championships	Tampere, Finland	July 14, 2018	U20 WL

==== International competitions ====
Year	Competition	Venue	Position	Event	Notes
Representing the United States
2017	Pan American U20 Championships	Trujilo, Peru	1st	4 × 100 meters relay	39.33 s PB
2018	World U20 Championships	Tampere, Finland	2nd	100 meters	10.22 s
2018	World U20 Championships	Tampere, Finland	1st	4 × 100 meters relay	38.88 s U20 WL PB

==== National titles ====
- USA Junior Championships
  - 100 meters: 2018

=== College football statistics ===
Year	Team	GP	Receiving				Rushing			
Year	Team	GP	Rec	Yds	Avg	TD	Att	Yds	Avg	TD
2018	Auburn	12	22	357	16.2	2	27	211	7.8	5
2019	Auburn	11	41	440	10.7	1	11	118	10.7	2
2020	Auburn	10	54	636	11.8	3	4	-6	-1.5	0
Total		33	117	1,433	12.2	6	42	323	11.0	7

== Professional career ==
Pre-draft measurables
Height	Weight	Arm length	Hand span	Wingspan	40-yard dash	10-yard split	20-yard split	20-yard shuttle	Three-cone drill	Vertical jump	Broad jump
6 ft 0 in (1.83 m)	186 lb (84 kg)	31 1/2 in (0.80 m)	9 3/8 in (0.24 m)	6 ft 3 1/2 in (1.92 m)	4.25 s	1.51 s	2.58 s	4.25 s	7.13 s	32.0 in (0.81 m)	10 ft 3 in (3.12 m)
All values from Pro Day

=== Cleveland Browns ===
On April 30, 2021, Schwartz was selected by the Cleveland Browns in the third round with the 91st overall pick in the 2021 NFL draft. On July 23, Schwartz signed his four-year rookie contract with Cleveland, worth $4.86 million. In a game against the Green Bay Packers on December 25, 2021, Schwartz collected his first NFL touchdown on a 5-yard completion from Baker Mayfield. He appeared in 14 games and started two as a rookie. He finished with ten receptions for 135 receiving yards and one touchdown.

On December 7, 2022, Schwartz was placed on injured reserve with a concussion. He appeared in 11 games and started one in the 2022 season.

On August 27, 2023, Schwartz was waived/injured by the Browns. He was released from injured reserve on September 19, 2023.

=== Miami Dolphins ===
On November 13, 2023, the Miami Dolphins signed Schwartz to their practice squad. He signed a reserve/future contract on January 15, 2024. He was placed on injured reserve on August 25, 2024.

== NFL career statistics ==
Year	Team	Games		Receiving					Rushing					Fumbles	
Year	Team	GP	GS	Rec	Yds	Avg	Lng	TD	Att	Yds	Avg	Lng	TD	FUM	Lost
2021	CLE	14	2	10	135	13.5	44	1	6	39	6.5	17	0	0	0
2022	CLE	11	1	4	51	12.8	19	0	4	57	14.3	31	1	1	1
Total		25	3	14	186	13.3	44	1	10	96	11.8	31	1	1	1

Records
Preceded by (Japan) Yoshihide Kiryū	Boys' World Youth Best Holder, 100 metres March 31, 2017 – August 2, 2022	Succeeded by (Thailand) Puripol Boonson
