= Stella Wonruku =

Ugandan sprinter

Stella Wonruku (born June 16th, 1999) is a Ugandan sprinter.

She participated in the Women's 4$\times$400m relay at the 2019 IAAF World Relays in Yokohama, Japan with her team taking sixth position. At the 2019 African games in Rabat, Morocco, Wonruku's team also won a bronze medal in the Women's 4$\times$400 metres relay.
