= 2018 IAAF World U20 Championships – Men's 4 × 100 metres relay =

Men's 4 x 100 metres relay at the 2018 World U20 Championships
- Venue: Ratina Stadium
- Dates: 13 and 14 July
- Nations: 22
- Winning time: 38.88

Medalists
| gold medal | Eric Harrison; Anthony Schwartz; Austin Kratz; Micah Williams | United States |
| silver medal | Xavier Nairne; Christopher Taylor; Jhevaughn Matherson; Michael Stephens | Jamaica |
| bronze medal | Lucas Ansah-Peprah; Marvin Schulte; Milo Skupin-Alfa; Luis Brandner | Germany |

The men's 4 × 100 metres relay at the 2018 IAAF World U20 Championships was held at Ratina Stadium on 13 and 14 July.

== Records ==
Standing records prior to the 2018 IAAF World U20 Championships in Athletics
| World Junior Record | United States | 38.66 | Grosseto, Italy | 18 July 2004 |
| Championship Record | United States | 38.66 | Grosseto, Italy | 18 July 2004 |
| World Junior Leading | South Africa | 39.33 | Boksburg, South Africa | 28 April 2018 |

== Results ==
=== Heats ===
Qualification: First 2 of each heat ( Q ) plus the 2 fastest times ( q ) qualified for the final.

| Rank | Heat | Nation | Athletes | Time | Notes |
|---|---|---|---|---|---|
| 1 | 2 | Germany | Lucas Ansah-Peprah, Marvin Schulte, Milo Skupin-Alfa, Luis Brandner | 39.13 | Q |
| 2 | 3 | Japan | Satoru Fukushima, Daisuke Miyamoto, Koki Ueyama, Keigo Yasuda | 39.18 | Q |
| 3 | 3 | United States | Joseph Anderson, Jared Hayes, Austin Kratz, Micah Williams | 39.49 | Q |
| 4 | 3 | Trinidad and Tobago | Kion Benjamin, Carlon Hosten, David Pierce, Tyrell Edwards | 39.67 | q |
| 5 | 2 | Jamaica | Jhevaughn Matherson, Michael Stephens, Xavier Nairne, Orlando Bennett | 39.68 | Q |
| 6 | 1 | Italy | Francesco Libera, Lorenzo Paissan, Mario Marchei, Lorenzo Patta | 39.75 | Q |
| 7 | 1 | Czech Republic | Stanislav Jíra, Štepán Hampl, Matěj Krsek, Daniel Vejražka | 39.91 | Q |
| 8 | 3 | Spain | Juan González, Jesús Gómez, Joan Martínez, Sergio López | 39.99(.984) | q |
| 9 | 2 | Poland | Szymon Woźniak, Damian Sztejkowski, Rafał Pająk, Artur Łęczycki | 39.99(.989) | |
| 10 | 2 | Finland | Jesse Väyrynen, Santeri Örn, Konsta Alatupa, Tommi Mäkinen | 40.26 | |
| 11 | 1 | Ireland | Conor Morey, David McDonald, Jack Dempsey, Aaron Sexton | 40.51 | |
| 12 | 2 | Greece | Christos Papadopoulos, Evangelos Kaikis, Sotirios Komianos Gravvanis, Sotirios Gkaragkanis | 40.78 | |
| 13 | 1 | Hungary | Dominik Illovszky, Zoltán Wahl, Milán Pisch, Dániel Eszes | 40.84 | |
| 14 | 3 | Bahamas | Correy Sherrod, Denvaughn Whymns, Oscar Smith, Adrian Curry | 40.85 | |
| 15 | 3 | Turkey | Furkan Yıldırım, Aşkın Sadi Aşkın, Mustafa Onur Sadıkoğlu, Emrah Bozkurt | 40.87 | |
| 16 | 1 | Ukraine | Andriy Avramenko, Erik Kostrytsya, Oleksandr Pyrogov, Andriy Vasylevskyy | 41.09 | |
| 17 | 3 | India | Prajwal Mandanna, Akash Kumar, Balakumar Nithin, P.S. Saneesh | 41.11 | |
| 18 | 1 | Qatar | Abdelaziz Mohamed, Saoud Al Humaidi, Jaber Al Mamari, Owaab Barrow | 41.35 | |
| | 1 | Great Britain | Dominic Ashwell, Chad Miller, Michael Olsen, Kaie Chambers-Brown | DNF | |
| | 1 | Australia | Joshua Azzopardi, Thomas Agnew, Harrison Hunt, Jake Doran | DNF | |
| | 2 | South Africa | Silusapho Dingiswayo, Malesela Senona, Gabriel Louw, Thembo Monareng | DQ | 163.3(a) |
| | 2 | Saudi Arabia | | DNS | |

=== Final ===
| Rank | Lane | Nation | Athletes | Time | Notes |
|---|---|---|---|---|---|
| 1st place, gold medalist(s) | 4 | United States | Eric Harrison, Anthony Schwartz, Austin Kratz, Micah Williams | 38.88 | WJL |
| 2nd place, silver medalist(s) | 7 | Jamaica | Xavier Nairne, Christopher Taylor, Jhevaughn Matherson, Michael Stephens | 38.96 | NJR |
| 3rd place, bronze medalist(s) | 5 | Germany | Lucas Ansah-Peprah, Marvin Schulte, Milo Skupin-Alfa, Luis Brandner | 39.22 | |
| 4 | 3 | Japan | Satoru Fukushima, Daisuke Miyamoto, Koko Ueyama, Keigo Yasuda | 39.23 | |
| 5 | 8 | Czech Republic | Stanislav Jíra, Štepán Hampl, Matěj Krsek, Daniel Vejražka | 39.75 | SB |
| 6 | 1 | Spain | Juan González, Pol Retemal, Joan Martínez, Sergio López | 39.86 | SB |
| 7 | 2 | Trinidad and Tobago | Kion Benjamin, Carlon Hosten, Timothy Frederick, Tyrell Edwards | 39.87 | |
| | 6 | Italy | Francesco Libera, Lorenzo Paissan, Mario Marchei, Lorenzo Patta | DNF | |
