= Carley Thomas =

Australian middle-distance runner

Personal information
- Nationality: Australian
- Born: 26 December 2000 (age 25) Sydney, Australia
- Home town: Sydney, Australia
- Education: University of Washington '24; Castle Hill High School
- Employer: On Running
- Height: 1.68 m (5 ft 6 in)

Sport
- Sport: Track, Cross country
- Event(s): Middle-distance running, 5000 metres
- College team: Washington Huskies
- Club: On Athletic Club Oceanic Group
- Turned pro: 2024
- Coached by: Maurica Powell; 2019–present

Carley Thomas (born 26 December 2000) is an Australian athlete. She placed 37th in the women's 800 metres event at the 2019 World Athletics Championships. Thomas earned silver medals at 4 × 400 m (3:31.36) and 800m (2:01.13) at the 2018 World Junior Championships in Finland. Thomas won the 2017 Commonwealth Youth Games gold medals in the 800-meters and the mixed 4x400m where they set Oceana area age group record.

== NCAA ==
On February 3, 2023 at Boston University Bruce Lehane Scarlet and White Invitational, the Washington Huskies set college record in Distance medley relay DMR in 10:46.62. Thomas earned NCAA Division I All-American honors 7-times and won 2022 800m title at the Pac-12 Conference championships in Eugene, Oregon.
