= Hima Das =

Indian sprinter (born 2000)

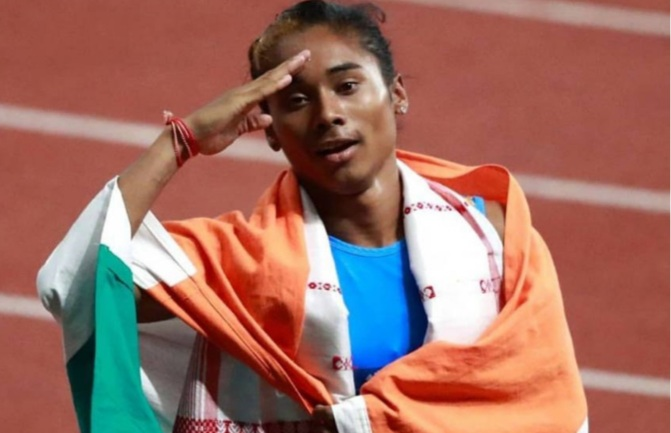
- Das at the 2018 Asian Games

Personal information
- Nickname: Dhing Express
- Born: 9 January 2000 (age 26) Dhing, Assam, India
- Height: 1.67 m (5 ft 6 in)
- Police career
- Department: Assam Police
- Service years: 2021–present
- Rank: Deputy Superintendent of Police

Sport
- Sport: Athletics
- Events: 100 m, 200 m, 400 m
- Coached by: Galina Bukharina

Achievements and titles
- Personal bests: 100 m: 11.43 (2022); 200 m: 22.88 (2021); 400 m: 50.79 NR NU20R (2018)
Medal record
Women's athletics
Representing India
Asian Games
Gold medal – first place	2018 Jakarta	4×400m
Gold medal – first place	2018 Jakarta	4×400m mixed
Silver medal – second place	2018 Jakarta	400 m
World U20 Championships
Gold medal – first place	2018 Tampere	400 m

Hima Das (born 9 January 2000) is an Indian sprinter. She holds the current Indian national record in 400 m with a time of 50.79 s that she clocked at the 2018 Asian Games. She is the first Indian athlete ever to win a gold medal in a track event at the World U20 Championships. She was appointed as a Deputy Superintendent of Police (DSP) in Assam Police under the state's Integrated Sport Policy. She received the Arjuna Award in 2018.

== Early life and education ==
Hima Das was born at Kandhulimari village, near the town of Dhing in her home state of Assam to Ronjit Das and Jonali Das. Her parents are farmers by profession. She is the youngest of five siblings.

At one of the inter-school camps held at the nearby Jawahar Navodaya Vidyalaya (JNV), she would arrive at the ground before practise began, and sometimes even before the gates were opened. A physical education teacher at the Vidyalaya was impressed by her determination and punctuality. He later convinced her to pursue a career in sprinting.

Das passed her 12th board exams in May 2019. As of 2018, she was pursuing her B.A degree in Cotton University, Assam.

== Career ==
In April 2018, Das competed in the 2018 Commonwealth Games at Gold Coast, Australia, in the 400 metres and the 4×400 metres relay.

On 12 July 2018, Das won the 400 m final at the World U-20 Championships 2018 held at Tampere, Finland, clocking 51.46 seconds and becoming the first Indian sprinter to win a gold medal at an international track event.

At the 2018 Asian Games, Das qualified for the 400 m final, after clocking 51.00 in heat 1 and setting a new Indian national record. On 26 August 2018 she improved the national record to 50.79 s in the 400 m final however she could win only the silver medal. Later on 30 August 2018, she, along with M. R. Poovamma, Sarita Gayakwad and V. K. Vismaya won the women's 4 × 400 metres relay clocking 3:28.72. Hima also won a gold medal in the 4 × 400 m mixed relay, which was held for the first time at Asian Games.

Das continued her success in 2019 winning the 200m gold in Poznan Grand Prix in Poland, on 2 July 2019, with a time of 23.65 seconds.

On 13 July, she won the 200m at the Kladno Meet in the Czech Republic with a time of 23.43 seconds.

On 20 July 2019, she achieved her third win in a month, and fifth win, in the 400-meters in Nové Město, Czech Republic in a time of 52.09 seconds.

She was named for the World Championships to be held at Doha in October 2019. However a month before, she was ruled out of participation due to a back problem, that had started right after she competed at the Asian games the previous year.

On 27 February 2021, Das enrolled as a civil servant in the post of Deputy Superintendent of Police of Assam Police Service cadre through Assam Public Service Commission Direct Entry.

== Anti-doping rule violation and suspension ==
In September 2023, Hima Das was provisionally suspended by the National Anti-Doping Agency (NADA) after missing three tests within a 12-month period. Although she was initially cleared to compete following a disciplinary hearing in March 2024, NADA later announced a retrospective 16-month suspension effective from 22 July 2023 to 21 November 2024. The suspension was issued under a case resolution agreement under the anti-doping rule violation rules, and as of 21 November 2024, Das has completed her suspension and is eligible to compete.

== Awards and accolades ==
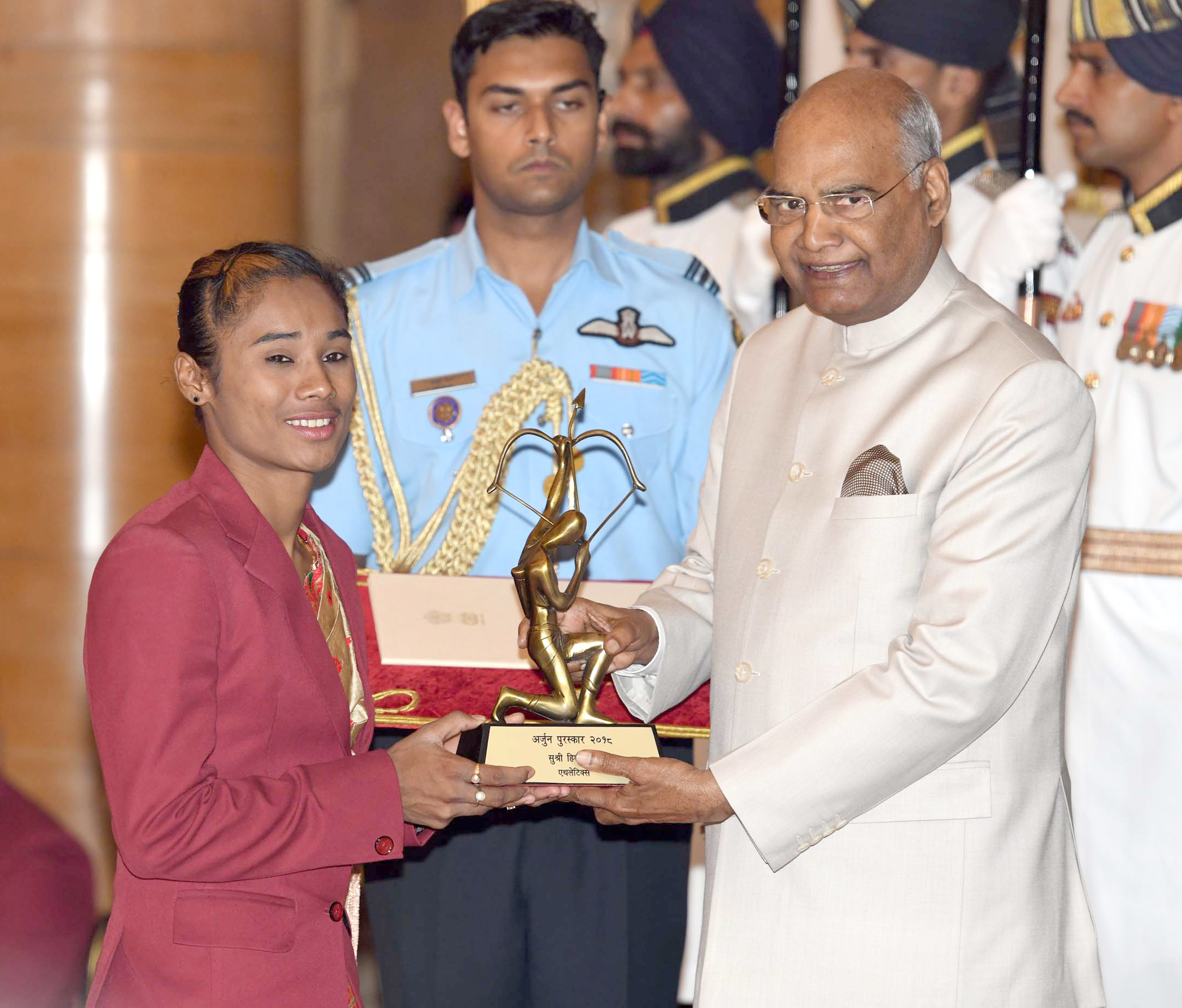
President Ram Nath Kovind presenting the Arjuna Award to Das (left) in 2018

- Conferred with Arjuna Award by the President of India on 25 September 2018.
- She has been a UNICEF Youth Ambassador for India since 2018.
- Das appeared in India's famous TV reality-show conducted by actor Amitabh Bachchan called Kaun Banega Crorepati on 1 November 2019.
- Hima Das Appointed as a civil servant under the post of Deputy Superintendent of Police in Assam Police Service cadre by Assam Public Service Commission without her appearing for the Combined Competitive Examination but through direct entry mode in February 2021
- Das is the second athlete from Assam after Bhogeswar Baruah to win a gold medal at an international event.
