= Adizero: Road to Records =

Annual road race in Germany

- Location: adidas HQ, Herzogenaurach, Germany
- Event type: Road
- Distance: Half marathon, 10km, 5km, Mile run
- Established: September 12, 2021; 5 years ago

Adizero: Road to Records is an annual elite running event hosted at the global headquarters of adidas in Herzogenaurach, Germany. Established in 2021, it is usually held at the end of April across a single day.

The event is split across six road races – male and female editions of the 5K run, 10K run, mile run, and half marathon, with all races taking place on a course within the adidas campus.

Four world records have been set at Road to Records. In the inaugural 2021 edition women's 5km, Senbere Teferi set a new global best of 14:29, while Agnes Tirop ran 30:01 in the women’s 10km. In 2023, Ethiopia's Medina Eisa set a new women's U20 5km record (14:46), while compatriot Senayet Getachew did the same in the women's U20 10km (30:34).

Other notable records have fallen at the event. In 2022, Italy’s Yemaneberhan Crippa broke the men’s 5km European record, while the men’s 10km race saw five athletes finish inside 27 minutes for the first time ever. In total, nine runners set new national records – including Nicholas Kimeli, who broke Kenya’s 22-year-old 5km record with a 12:55 run. At the time, it made him the third-fastest over that distance in history.

== 2025 results ==
The 2025 edition of the event took place on 26 April.

| World record |
| European record |
| National record |
| World U20 record |

Men’s 5km results
| Time | Name | Nationality |
|---|---|---|
| 12:54 | Yomif Kejelcha | Ethiopia |
| 13:03 | Andrew Kiptoo Alamisi | Kenya |
| 13:08 | Thierry Ndikumwenayo | Spain |
| 13:11 | Cornelius Kemboi | Kenya |
| 13:22 | Jacob Krop | Kenya |
| 13:28 | Daniel Kimaiyo | Kenya |
| 13:28 | Abdisa Fayisa | Ethiopia |
| 13:30 | Addisu Yihune | Ethiopia |
| 13:35 | Samuel Simba Cherop | Uganda |
| 13:36 | Clinton Kimutai Ngetich | Kenya |
| 13:40 | Sewmehon Anteneh | Ethiopia |
| 13:42 | Halefom Tesfay | Ethiopia |
| 13:45 | Takumi Orihashi | Japan |
| 13:48 | Yuhei Urano | Japan |
| 13:53 | Asahi Kuroda | Japan |
| 13:57 | Morgan Beadlescomb | USA |
| 13:58 | Jan Friš | Czechia |
| 14:04 | Jacktone Kipkosgei Bor | Kenya |
| 14:06 | Velten Schneider | Germany |
| 14:07 | Yuta Asano | Japan |
| 14:09 | Timo Hinterndorfer | Austria |
| 14:15 | Arata Iiguni | Japan |
| 14:23 | Hayato Oguma | Japan |
| 14:23 | Kaito Iida | Japan |
| 14:35 | Hiraku Ogawara | Japan |
| 14:56 | Dvir Tuval | Israel |

Women’s 5km results
| Time | Name | Nationality |
|---|---|---|
| 14:48 | Medina Eisa | Ethiopia |
| 14:50 | Fotyen Tesfay | Ethiopia |
| 14:51 | Gela Hambese | Ethiopia |
| 14:55 | Janeth Chepngetich | Kenya |
| 15:15 | Loice Chekwemoi | Uganda |
| 15:21 | Tsiyon Abebe | Ethiopia |
| 15:23 | Tinebeb Asres | Ethiopia |
| 15:27 | Katie Izzo | USA |
| 16:13 | Hiwot Mehari | Ethiopia |
| 16:32 | Chiara Scherrer | Switzerland |
| 16:33 | Monika Olejarz | Poland |

Men’s 10km results
| Time | Name | Nationality |
|---|---|---|
| 26:54 | Birhanu Balew | Bahrain |
| 26:54 | Gemechu Dida | Ethiopia |
| 26:54 | Rodrigue Kwizera | Burundi |
| 26:56 | Nicholas Kipkorir | Kenya |
| 27:08 | Vincent Kipkorir | Kenya |
| 27:38 | Haftamu Gebresilase | Ethiopia |
| 27:39 | Abel Bekele | Ethiopia |
| 27:41 | Martin Kiprotich | Uganda |
| 27:49 | Bereket Nega | Ethiopia |
| 27:54 | Victor Kipkirui Mutai | Kenya |
| 28:08 | Levy Kibet | Kenya |
| 28:12 | Johana Erot | Kenya |
| 28:13 | Charles Rotich | Kenya |
| 28:14 | Gideon Kipngetich | Kenya |
| 28:30 | Victor Kipruto Togom | Kenya |
| 28:37 | Wbet Gebrheat Muruts | Ethiopia |
| 29:11 | Japheth Kipkemboi | Kenya |
| 29:12 | Ignacio Erario | Argentina |
| 29:32 | Mateusz Kaczor | Poland |
| 29:33 | Rubén Barbosa | Colombia |
| 29:33 | Sebastian Hendel | Germany |
| 30:09 | Shuna Ishimaru | Japan |
| 32:13 | Sanchai Namkhet | Thailand |
| 32:38 | Lucas Baez | Argentina |

Women’s 10km results
| Time | Name | Nationality |
|---|---|---|
| 29:27 | Agnes Jebet Ngetich | Kenya |
| 30:30 | Fantaye Belayneh | Ethiopia |
| 30:31 | Senayet Getachew | Ethiopia |
| 30:41 | Girmawit Gebrzihair | Ethiopia |
| 31:15 | Alemaddis Eyayu | Ethiopia |
| 31:40 | Lemlem Nibret | Ethiopia |
| 31:44 | Thalia Valdivia | Peru |
| 31:44 | Faith Cherono | Kenya |
| 31:52 | Nurit Ahmed | Ethiopia |
| 32:11 | Yalemget Yaregal | Ethiopia |
| 32:39 | Debash Desta | Ethiopia |
| 32:49 | Alemaz Samuel | Ethiopia |
| 33:49 | Chiara Milena Mainetti | Argentina |
| 34:18 | Leidy Lozano | Colombia |
| 34:44 | Ying Chu Lo | Hong Kong |
| 38:52 | Beatriz Elena Garcia | Mexico |

Men’s mile results
| Time | Name | Nationality |
|---|---|---|
| 3:52.45 | Emmanuel Wanyonyi | Kenya |
| 3:54.34 | Hobbs Kessler | USA |
| 3:54.50 | Nico Young | USA |
| 3:56.08 | Phanuel Kipkosgei Koech | Kenya |
| 3:58.63 | Koech Kibiwott | Kenya |
| 3:59.42 | General Berhanu Ayansa | Ethiopia |
| 3:59.57 | Josh Hoey | USA |
| 4:00.92 | Josphat Kipkirui | Kenya |
| 4:02.48 | Sam Prakel | USA |
| 4:04.93 | Marco Arop | Canada |
| 4:07.50 | Joe Waskom | USA |
| 4:08.32 | Abdallah Harek | Algeria |
| 4:09.35 | Callum Dodds | United Kingdom |
| 4:12.36 | Bryce Hoppel | USA |
| 4:13.95 | Kain Inagak | Japan |
| 4:21.73 | Bi Jinghan | China |

Women’s mile results
| Time | Name | Nationality |
|---|---|---|
| 4:23.99 | Nelly Chepchirchir | Kenya |
| 4:26.83 | Hawi Abera | Ethiopia |
| 4:31.49 | Addison Wiley | USA |
| 4:37.00 | Birtukan Degu | Ethiopia |
| 4:41.34 | Taryn Rawlings | USA |
| 4:48.70 | Jebet Brance | Kenya |
| 4:50.20 | Ksanet Alem | Ethiopia |
| 4:51.73 | Shellcy Sarmiento | Colombia |

== 2024 results ==
The 2024 edition of the event took place on 27 April.

| World record |
| European record |
| National record |
| World U20 record |

Men’s 5km results
| Time | Name | Nationality |
|---|---|---|
| 13:00 | Yomif Kejelcha | Ethiopia |
| 13:05 | Addisu Yihune | Ethiopia |
| 13:12 | Birhanu Balew | Bahrain |
| 13:13 | Raphael Dapash | Kenya |
| 13:17 | Thierry Ndikumwenayo | Spain |
| 13:18 | Daniel Kimaiyo | Kenya |
| 13:20 | Andrew Kiptoo Alamisi | Kenya |
| 13:24 | Abel Bekele | Ethiopia |
| 13:34 | Sewmehon Anteneh | Ethiopia |
| 13:35 | Morgan Beadlescomb | USA |
| 13:43 | Cornelius Kemboi | Kenya |
| 13:45 | Shimelis Nigusse | Ethiopia |
| 13:50 | Andrew Hunter | USA |
| 13:55 | Leonard Chemutai | Uganda |
| 14:00 | Kosei Atomura | Japan |
| 14:30 | Ryuto Uehara | Japan |
| 14:30 | Hiromichi Nonaka | Japan |
| 14:33 | Shota Shiode | Japan |
| 14:35 | Akima Nomura | Japan |
| 14:38 | Shunya Udagawa | Japan |
| 14:38 | Junna Ishimaru | Japan |
| 14:42 | Hiroki Wakabayasi | Japan |
| 15:16 | Dvir Tuval | Israel |
| 15:24 | Kenta Torii | Japan |
| 15:29 | Shim Jung-sub | South Korea |

Women’s 5km results
| Time | Name | Nationality |
|---|---|---|
| 14:38 | Medina Eisa | Ethiopia |
| 14:40 | Melknat Wudu | Ethiopia |
| 14:41 | Fotyen Tesfay | Ethiopia |
| 15:01 | Diana Chepkorir | Kenya |
| 15:20 | Hiwot Meharil | Ethiopia |
| 15:20 | Lemlem Nibret | Ethiopia |
| 15:39 | Tinebeb Asres | Ethiopia |
| 15:49 | Dawit Seyaum | Ethiopia |
| 15:50 | Anastasia Marinakou | Greece |
| 16:09 | Margaux Sieracki | France |
| 16:12 | Sabina Jarzabek | Poland |
| 16:34 | Marion Jepngetich | Kenya |

Men’s 10km results
| Time | Name | Nationality |
|---|---|---|
| 27:05 | Nicholas Kipkorir | Kenya |
| 27:06 | Sabastian Kimaru Sawe | Kenya |
| 27:07 | Rodrigue Kwizera | Burundi |
| 27:08 | Yemaneberhan Crippa | Italy |
| 27:11 | Vincent Kibet Langat | Kenya |
| 27:11 | Weldon Langat | Kenya |
| 27:20 | Gemechu Dida Diriba | Ethiopia |
| 27:27 | Chimdessa Debele | Ethiopia |
| 27:38 | Muktar Edris | Ethiopia |
| 27:40 | Jacob Krop | Kenya |
| 27:42 | Levy Kibet | Kenya |
| 27:42 | Amanal Petros | Germany |
| 27:47 | Richard Etir | Kenya |
| 27:59 | Victor Kipkirui Mutai | Kenya |
| 28:07 | Dennis Kibet Kitiyo | Kenya |
| 28:08 | Martin Kiprotich | Uganda |
| 28:18 | Hosea Kiplangat | Uganda |
| 28:24 | Kelvin Kibiwott | Kenya |
| 29:20 | Reed Fischer | USA |
| 30:25 | Ömer Alkanoğlu | Turkey |

Women’s 10km results
| Time | Name | Nationality |
|---|---|---|
| 30:03 | Agnes Jebet Ngetich | Kenya |
| 30:39 | Margaret Chelimo Kipkemboi | Kenya |
| 30:46 | Jesca Chelangat | Kenya |
| 30:52 | Joan Chelimo Melly | Romania |
| 30:52 | Karoline Bjerkeli Grøvdal | Norway |
| 30:53 | Bertukan Welde | Ethiopia |
| 30:56 | Girmawit Gebrzihair | Ethiopia |
| 30:59 | Senayet Getachew | Ethiopia |
| 31:01 | Stacey Chemkemboi Ndiwa | Kenya |
| 31:15 | Yalemget Yaregal | Ethiopia |
| 31:16 | Fantaye Belayneh | Ethiopia |
| 31:18 | Vivian Melly | Kenya |
| 31:48 | Debash Desta | Ethiopia |
| 33:44 | Faith Cherono | Kenya |

Men’s mile results
| Time | Name | Nationality |
|---|---|---|
| 3:54.6h | Emmanuel Wanyonyi | Kenya |
| 3:56.2h | Hobbs Kessler | USA |
| 3:56.5h | Ryan Mphahlele | South Africa |
| 3:58.8h | Charles Cheboi Simotwo | Kenya |
| 4:00.1h | Koech Kibiwott | Kenya |
| 4:01.3h | Henry McLuckie | Great Britain |
| 4:02.2h | Sam Prakel | USA |
| 4:05.0h | Paul Ryan | USA |
| 4:09.6h | Archie Davis | Great Britain |
| 4:10.9h | Wegene Adisu | Ethiopia |
| 4:12.6 | Eric Avila | USA |

Women’s mile results
| Time | Name | Nationality |
|---|---|---|
| 4:31.0h | Nelly Chepchirchir | Kenya |
| 4:32.0h | Addison Wiley | USA |
| 4:32.6h | Alexandra Bell | Great Britain |
| 4:32.7h | Hawi Abera | Ethiopia |
| 4:33.8h | Ksanet Alem | Ethiopia |
| 4:41.4h | Adanu Nenko | Ethiopia |
| 4:41.5h | Emine Hatun Mechaal | Turkey |
| 4:43.1h | Taryn Rawlings | USA |
| 4:48.0h | Naumglorious Chepchumba | Kenya |

== 2023 results ==
The 2023 edition of the event took place on 29 April.

| World record |
| European record |
| National record |
| World U20 record |

Men’s 5km results
| Time | Name | Nationality |
|---|---|---|
| 13:06 | Birhanu Balew | Bahrain |
| 13:06 | Yomif Kejelcha | Ethiopia |
| 13:11 | Rodrigue Kwizera | Burundi |
| 13:22 | Addisu Yihune | Ethiopia |
| 13:24 | Mafori Ryan Mphahlele | South Africa |
| 13:27 | Muktar Edris | Ethiopia |
| 13:33 | Leonard Kipkemoi Bett | Kenya |
| 13:34 | Wegene Addisu | Ethiopia |
| 13:38 | Yohanes Dangaw | Ethiopia |
| 13:41 | Victor Kipkirui Mutai | Kenya |
| 13:45 | Thierry Ndikumwenayo | Spain |
| 13:53 | Samuel Firewu | Ethiopia |
| 13:57 | Alexis Miellet | France |
| 14:05 | Takele Nigate | Ethiopia |
| 14:13 | Asahi Kuroda | Japan |
| 14:19 | Birhanu Sorsa | Ethiopia |
| 14:23 | Adehena Kasaye | Kenya |
| 14:31 | Aoi Oota | Japan |
| 14:41 | Taiga Nakanishi | Japan |
| 14:44 | Tomoki Aramaki | Japan |
| 14:45 | Yufan Chen | China |
| 14:54 | Shunya Sasaki | Japan |
| 15:06 | Sena Minawatari | Japan |
| 15:09 | Chun Luo | Japan |

Women’s 5km results
| Time | Name | Nationality |
|---|---|---|
| 14:46 | Medina Eisa | Ethiopia |
| 14:46 | Senbere Teferio | Ethiopia |
| 14:48 | Girmawit Gerbzihair | Ethiopia |
| 14:57 | Lemlem Nibret | Ethiopia |
| 15:01 | Yalemget Yaregal | Ethiopia |
| 15:04 | Melknat Wudu | Ethiopia |
| 15:09 | Brenda Chebet | Kenya |
| 15:09 | Karoline Bjerkeli Grøvdal | Norway |
| 15:26 | Alina Reh | Germany |
| 15:33 | Katie Izzo | USA |
| 15:35 | Zenah Cheptoo | Kenya |
| 15:39 | Gebrewahd Letebrhan | Ethiopia |
| 15:53 | Marta Perez | Spain |
| 16:10 | Jenefir Do Nascimento Silva | Brazil |
| 16:21 | Tefri Meseret | Ethiopia |
| 16:25 | Guteta Mesay | Ethiopia |
| 16:27 | Paula Herrero | Spain |
| 16:33 | Deborah Schöneborn | Germany |

Men’s 10km results
| Time | Name | Nationality |
|---|---|---|
| 26:49 | Sabastian Sawe | Kenya |
| 26:53 | Kibiwott Kandie | Kenya |
| 26:54 | Nicholas Kimeli | Kenya |
| 27:09 | Rhonex Kipruto | Kenya |
| 27:14 | Levy Kibet | Kenya |
| 27:14 | Hosea Kiplagat | Uganda |
| 27:16 | Gemechu Dida Diriba | Ethiopia |
| 27:20 | Yasin Haji Hayato | Ethiopia |
| 27:26 | Tadese Worku | Ethiopia |
| 27:29 | Chimdessa Debele Gudeta | Ethiopia |
| 27:29 | Kelvin Kibiwott | Kenya |
| 27:54 | Shadrack Ruto | Kenya |
| 27:56 | Daniel Rosen | Kenya |
| 27:56 | Isaac Kipkemboi | Kenya |
| 28:06 | Geoffrey Koech | Kenya |
| 28:13 | Mogos Tuemay | Ethiopia |
| 28:25 | Araso Negasa Gemeda | Ethiopia |
| 28:27 | Cosmas Mwangi Boi | Kenya |
| 28:30 | Fredrick Yeko Domongole | Kenya |
| 28:32 | Carlos Mayo | Spain |
| 28:36 | Charles Lokir | Kenya |
| 28:55 | Jun Kasai | Japan |
| 28:56 | Denis Kipngetich | Kenya |
| 29:00 | Girmaw Amare | Ethiopia |
| 29:27 | Dereje Checkhole | Israel |
| 30:16 | Gerard Giraldo | Colombia |
| 33:01 | Chieh-Wen Chiang | China |
| 33:28 | Kai Lok Wong | China |

Women’s 10km results
| Time | Name | Nationality |
|---|---|---|
| 30:23 | Irine Jepchumba Kimais | Kenya |
| 30:26 | Fotyen Tesfay | Ethiopia |
| 30:27 | Agnes Jebet Ngetich | Kenya |
| 30:34 | Senayet Getachew | Ethiopia |
| 30:38 | Margaret Chelimo Kipkemboi | Kenya |
| 30:53 | Veronica Loleo | Kenya |
| 31:03 | Esther Borura | Kenya |
| 31:11 | Cintia Chepngeno | Kenya |
| 31:21 | Joan Chelimo Melly | Romania |
| 31:24 | Mebrat Gidey | Ethiopia |
| 31:32 | Brenda Tuwei | Kenya |
| 31:46 | Nelly Jeptoo | South Africa |
| 32:53 | Cian Oldknow | Kenya |
| 34:01 | Angelika Mach | Poland |
| 34:05 | Charlotte Purdue | Great Britain |
| 34:55 | Iwona Bernardelli | Poland |
| 35:22 | Sanna Mustonen | Hong Kong |

Men’s half marathon results
| Time | Name | Nationality |
|---|---|---|
| 1:00:04 | Tedese Takele | Ethiopia |
| 1:00:08 | Josphat Chumo | Kenya |
| 1:00:08 | Roncer Kipkorir | Kenya |
| 1:00:16 | Mathew Kimeli | Kenya |
| 1:00:24 | Kennedy Kimeli | Kenya |
| 1:00:31 | Charles Muneria | Kenya |
| 1:00:37 | Edwin Kiptoo | Kenya |
| 1:01:08 | Dennis Kibet Kitiyo | Kenya |
| 1:01:26 | Moses Kibet | Kenya |
| 1:01:33 | Jacob Kosgei | Kenya |
| 1:01:52 | Reed Fischer | USA |
| 1:01:59 | Abel Mutai | Kenya |
| 1:02:33 | Bernard Kimeli | Kenya |
| 1:02:41 | Abdisa Tola | Ethiopia |
| 1:02:42 | Kibrom Desta Habtu | Ethiopia |

Women’s half marathon results
| Time | Name | Nationality |
|---|---|---|
| 1:07:44 | Bertukan Welde | Ethiopia |
| 1:07:44 | Nigsti Haftu | Ethiopia |
| 1:07:47 | Dera Dida | Ethiopia |
| 1:07:59 | Anchinalu Dessie | Ethiopia |
| 1:08:10 | Ayinadis Teshome | Ethiopia |
| 1:08:41 | Madina Mehamed | Ethiopia |
| 1:09:20 | Dorcas Jepchumba Kimeli | Kenya |
| 1:09:26 | Alemitu Tariku | Ethiopia |
| 1:09:32 | Emily Durgin | USA |
| 1:12:06 | Nesphine Jepleting | Kenya |
| 1:12:25 | Valentine Jepkoech Rutto | Kenya |
| 1:14:41 | Maria Fernanda Montoya Marin | Colombia |

== 2022 results ==
The 2022 edition took place on 30 April.

| World record |
| European record |
| National record |
| World U20 record |

Men’s 5km results
| Time | Name | Nationality |
|---|---|---|
| 12:53 | Yomif Kejelcha | Ethiopia |
| 12:55 | Nicholas Kimeli | Kenya |
| 13:02 | Levy Kibet | Kenya |
| 13:07 | Birhanu Balew | Bahrain |
| 13:11 | Telahun Haile Bekele | Ethiopia |
| 13:12 | Addisu Yihune | Ethiopia |
| 13:14 | Yemaneberhan Crippa | Italy |
| 13:18 | Jacob Krop | Kenya |
| 13:23 | Muktar Edris | Ethiopia |
| 13:30 | Hosea Kiplangat | Uganda |
| 13:34 | Yemane Haileselassie | Eritrea |
| 13:34 | Gebeyehu Belay | Ethiopia |
| 13:38 | Bravin Kiptoo | Kenya |
| 13:38 | Emile Cairess | Great Britain |
| 13:39 | Olkera Endela | Kenya |
| 13:41 | Daniel Kinyanjui | Kenya |
| 13:42 | Benjamin Kigen | Kenya |
| 13:44 | Benard Yegon | Kenya |
| 13:45 | Dennis Kipkurui | Kenya |
| 13:49 | Florian Carvalho | France |

Women’s 5km results
| Time | Name | Nationality |
|---|---|---|
| 14:37 | Senbere Teferi | Ethiopia |
| 14:53 | Medina Eisa | Ethiopia |
| 14:56 | Mercy Cherono | Kenya |
| 15:11 | Melknet Wudu | Ethiopia |
| 15:12 | Nigsti Haftu | Ethiopia |
| 15:13 | Nadia Battocletti | Italy |
| 15:16 | Jesca Chelangat | Kenya |
| 15:30 | Zenah Cheptoo | Kenya |
| 15:37 | Agnes Ngetich | Kenya |
| 15:42 | Marion Jepngetich | Kenya |
| 15:47 | Miriam Dattke | Germany |
| 15:50 | Emily Lipari | USA |
| 15:52 | Marta Perez | Spain |
| 15:55 | Rabea Schöneborn | Germany |
| 16:06 | Anastasia Marinakou | Greece |
| 16:12 | Mao Uesugi | Japan |
| 16:55 | Sofia Mamani | Canada |

Men's 10km results
| Time | Name | Nationality |
|---|---|---|
| 26:50 | Kibiwott Kandie | Kenya |
| 26:54 | Sabastian Sawe | Kenya |
| 26:56 | Rodrigue Kwizera | Burundi |
| 26:58 | Rhonex Kipruto | Kenya |
| 26:59 | Tadese Worku | Ethiopia |
| 27:00 | Yasin Haji | Ethiopia |
| 27:19 | Dida Gemechu | Ethiopia |
| 27:21 | Weldon Langat | Kenya |
| 27:23 | Philemon Kiplimo | Kenya |
| 27:29 | Geoffrey Koech | Kenya |
| 27:40 | Cornelius Kemboi | Kenya |
| 28:09 | Mogos Tuemay | Ethiopia |
| 28:13 | Carlos Mayo | Spain |
| 29:01 | Shadrack Koech | Kenya |
| 29:20 | Aras Kaya | Turkey |
| 29:46 | Ghirmay Ghebreslassie | Eritrea |

Women's 10km results
| Time | Name | Nationality |
|---|---|---|
| 30:24 | Fantaye Belayneh | Ethiopia |
| 30:33 | Joyce Chepkemoi | Kenya |
| 30:35 | Sheila Chepkirui | Kenya |
| 30:50 | Faith Cherono | Kenya |
| 31:02 | Esther Borura | Kenya |
| 31:10 | Bekelech Gudeta | Ethiopia |
| 31:11 | Sarah Chelangat | Uganda |
| 31:19 | Viola Chepngego | Kenya |
| 31:21 | Irine Jepchumba Kimais | Kenya |
| 31:29 | Medhin Gebreselassie | Ethiopia |
| 31:48 | Sofiya Shemsu | Ethiopia |
| 31:50 | Birho Adhena Gidey | Ethiopia |
| 31:57 | Fancy Chemutai | Kenya |
| 32:04 | Yasemin Can | Turkey |
| 32:09 | Dominique Scott-Efurd | South Africa |
| 32:26 | Agnes Mumbua | Kenya |
| 32:37 | Tayla Kavanagh | South Africa |
| 32:41 | Dolshi Tesfu | Eritrea |
| 32:45 | Gloria Kite | Kenya |
| 33:09 | Sarah Pagano | USA |

Men's half marathon results
| Time | Name | Nationality |
|---|---|---|
| 59:30 | Mathew Kimeli | Kenya |
| 59:32 | Bernard Kimeli | Kenya |
| 59:36 | Alfred Barkach | Kenya |
| 59:40 | Amos Kurgat | Kenya |
| 59:41 | Tadese Takele | Ethiopia |
| 59:46 | Tamirat Tola | Ethiopia |
| 59:56 | Edmond Kipngetich | Kenya |
| 1:00:18 | Kennedy Kimutai | Kenya |
| 1:01:21 | Hassan Chahdi | France |
| 1:02:32 | Samuel Tsegay | Sweden |
| 1:03:33 | Kiyoto Hirabayashi | Japan |
| 1:09:97 | Ivan Gonzalez | Colombia |

Women's half marathon results
| Time | Name | Nationality |
|---|---|---|
| 1:07:28 | Tigist Assefa | Ethiopia |
| 1:07:36 | Rosemary Wanjiru | Kenya |
| 1:07:42 | Ftaw Zeray | Ethiopia |
| 1:07:45 | Aynadis Mebrit | Ethiopia |
| 1:08:00 | Nesphine Jepleting | Kenya |
| 1:08:04 | Cynthia Nolar | Kenya |
| 1:08:18 | Vivian Jepkemei | Kenya |
| 1:10:52 | Joyline Chemutai | Kenya |
| 1:16:02 | Maria Montoya Marin | Colombia |

== 2021 results ==
The 2021 edition took place on 12 September.

| World record |
| European record |
| National record |

Men’s 5km results
| Time | Name | Nationality |
|---|---|---|
| 13:06 | Jacob Krop | Kenya |
| 13:09 | Muktar Edris | Ethiopia |
| 13:13 | Hosea Kiplangat | Uganda |
| 13:22 | Geoffrey Koech | Kenya |
| 13:27 | Daniel Kinyanji | Kenya |
| 13:31 | Leonard Bett | Kenya |
| 13:34 | Mathew Kimeli | Kenya |
| 13:36 | Benjamin Kigen | Kenya |
| 13:47 | Brimin Kiprotich | Kenya |
| 13:48 | Robert Kiprop | Kenya |
| 13:49 | Abraham Kibiot | Kenya |
| 13:56 | Simon Kiprop Koech | Kenya |
| 14:11 | Bernard Kibet Yegon | Kenya |
| 14:20 | Haron Chepkwony | Kenya |

Women’s 5km results
| Time | Name | Nationality |
|---|---|---|
| 14:29 | Senbere Teferi | Ethiopia |
| 14:54 | Melknat Wudu | Ethiopia |
| 14:54 | Nigisti Haftu | Ethiopia |
| 15:02 | Agnes Ngetich | Kenya |
| 15:10 | Dawit Seyaum | Ethiopia |
| 15:13 | Medina Eisa | Ethiopia |
| 15:15 | Alemitu Tarikua | Ethiopia |
| 15:23 | Yasemin Can | Turkey |
| 15:36 | Feliciana Jepkosgei | Kenya |
| 15:43 | Rosemary Wanjiru | Kenya |
| 15:47 | Edna Chepkemoi | Kenya |
| 15:56 | Mekides Abebe | Ethiopia |
| 16:07 | Marion Jepngetich | Kenya |

Men’s 10km results
| Time | Name | Nationality |
|---|---|---|
| 26:43 | Rhonex Kipruto | Kenya |
| 26:56 | Tadese Worku | Ethiopia |
| 27:09 | Kennedy Kimutai | Kenya |
| 27:22 | Nicholas Kimeli | Kenya |
| 27:24 | Bayelign Teshager | Ethiopia |
| 27:27 | Collins Koros | Kenya |
| 27:40 | Weldon Langat | Kenya |
| 27:50 | Mogus Tuemay | Ethiopia |
| 28:01 | Isaac Kibet | Kenya |
| 28:11 | Cornelius Kemboi | Kenya |
| 28:20 | Birhanu Balew | Bahrain |
| 28:30 | Eyob Faniel | Italy |
| 28:42 | Reuban Mosin Mosip | Kenya |
| 29:47 | Solomon Kiplimo Boit | Kenya |

Women’s 10km results
| Time | Name | Nationality |
|---|---|---|
| 30:01 | Agnes Tirop | Kenya |
| 30:17 | Sheila Chepkirui | Kenya |
| 30:50 | Nancy Jelagat | Kenya |
| 31:09 | Betty Chepkemoi Kimeli | Kenya |
| 32:18 | Gloria Kite | Kenya |
| 32:24 | Sofiya Shemsu | Ethiopia |
| 32:30 | Alina Reh | Germany |
| 33:30 | Alemaddis Eyayu Sisay | Ethiopia |
| 34:37 | Zenah Cheptoo | Kenya |

Men’s half marathon results
| Time | Name | Nationality |
|---|---|---|
| 58:48 | Abel Kipchumba | Kenya |
| 59:20 | Alexander Mutiso Munyao | Kenya |
| 59:34 | Amos Kurgat | Kenya |
| 1:00:00 | Raymond Magut | Kenya |
| 1:00:08 | Phenus Kipleting | Kenya |
| 1:00:52 | Edwin Kiptoo | Kenya |
| 1:01:06 | Wesley Kibichii | Kenya |
| 1:02:05 | Dagnachew Adere | Ethiopia |
| 1:03:10 | Haimanot Mateb Muluneh | Ethiopia |
| 1:03:27 | Denis Chirchir | Kenya |
| 1:05:59 | Girma Bekele Gebre | Ethiopia |

Women’s half marathon results
| Time | Name | Nationality |
|---|---|---|
| 1:06:52 | Brenda Jepleting | Kenya |
| 1:08:15 | Besu Sado Deku | Ethiopia |
| 1:08:28 | Brillian Jepkorir Kipkoech | Kenya |
| 1:08:30 | Tgise Haileselasie | Kenya |
| 1:09:02 | Irine Jepchumba Kimais | Kenya |
| 1:09:13 | Viola Cheptoo | Kenya |
| 1:09:25 | Nesphine Jepleting | Kenya |
| 1:09:42 | Birho Gidey | Ethiopia |
| 1:09:48 | Sheila Jebiwot | Kenya |
| 1:10:58 | Dorcas Tuitoek | Kenya |
