= 2019 Shanghai Diamond League =

2019 Diamond League Shanghai
- Dates: 18 May 2019
- Host city: Shanghai, China
- Venue: Shanghai Stadium
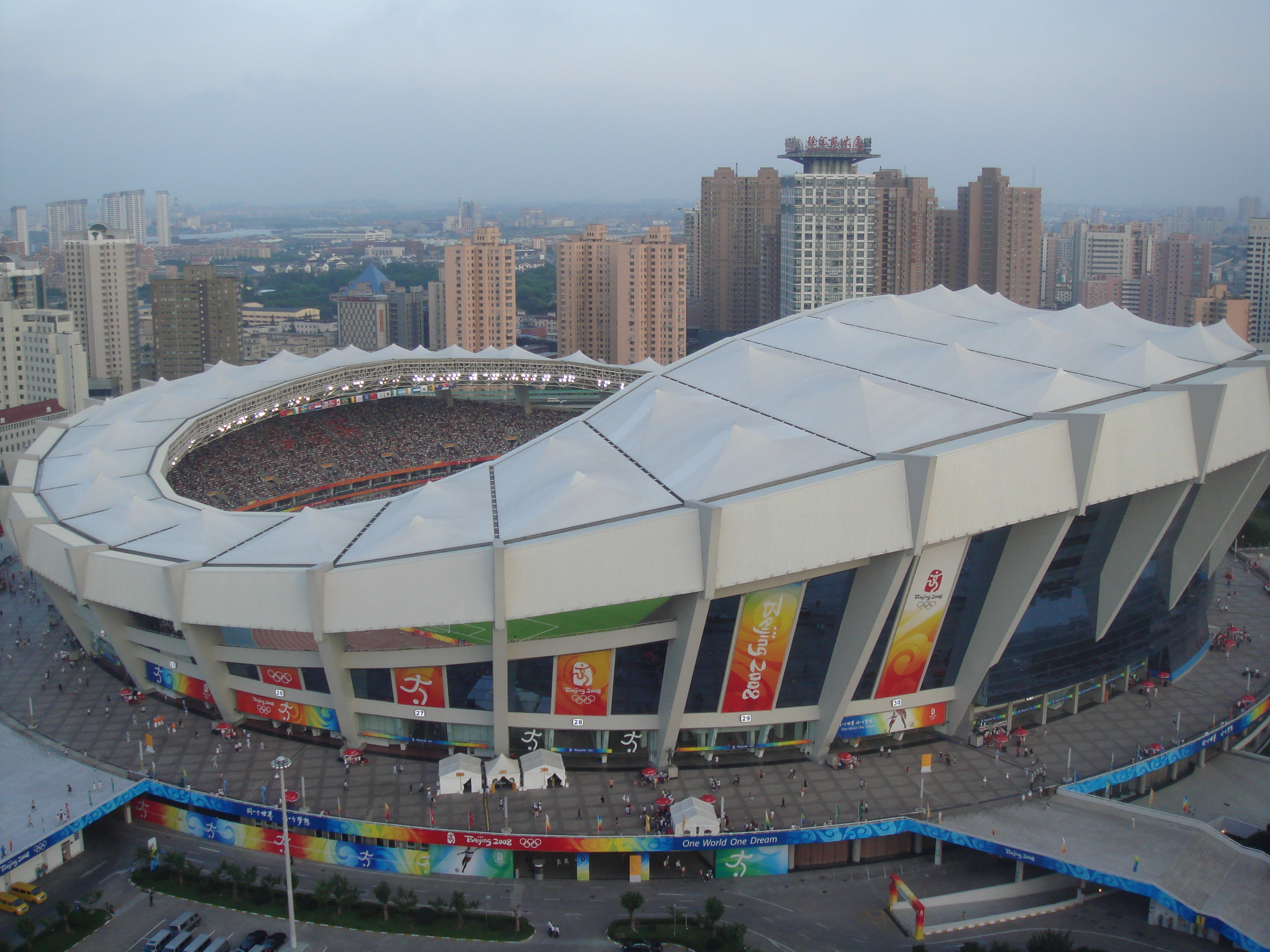
- Level: 2019 IAAF Diamond League
- Events: 24 (15 Diamond League)

The 2019 Diamond League Shanghai was the 15th edition of the annual outdoor track and field meeting in Shanghai, China. Held on 18 May at the Shanghai Stadium, it was the second leg of the 2019 IAAF Diamond League – the highest level international track and field circuit. 24 events were contested with 15 of them being point-earning Diamond League disciplines. The other events were held for Chinese nationals, except for the men's 200 m which attracted an international field of Olympic and world medalists.

Highlights included an Asian and Chinese record in the women's pole vault by Li Ling with a mark of 4.72 m on her second attempt (though she placed second to world champion Katerina Stefanidi who vaulted the same height but on her first attempt), and a meeting record by Lyu Huihui in the javelin throw of 66.89 m to defend her 2018 meeting title. Also in the women's events were the world leading times of 4:01.15 in the 1500 m by Rababe Arafi, and 9:04.53 in the 3000 m steeplechase by world record holder Beatrice Chepkoech, the latter also a meeting record. 19-year old Sydney McLaughlin, the fastest junior in history in the 400 m hurdles, stepped into the hurdles-free 400 m and was able to stay with the reigning Diamond League champion Salwa Eid Naser for most of the race, but Naser pulled away in the home straight with a seasonal best of 50.65 seconds.

On the men's side one of the most anticipated events was the 400 m hurdles in which Abderrahman Samba and Rai Benjamin, the second and third fastest in history respectively in the event, met for the first time in competition. Samba however ran away with a clear victory in a meeting record and world leading 47.27 seconds, ahead of second place Benjamin who finished in a seasonal best of 47.80 seconds. The 100 m was a much closer race, with reigning Diamond League champions Christian Coleman and Noah Lyles in the 100 m and 200 m respectively both finishing in a world leading 9.86 seconds. In an upset the victory was given to Lyles after an analysis of the race footage showed Lyles finishing in 9.852 to Coleman's 9.858. Olympic and world champion Omar McLeod came back to win for the fourth year in a row in the 110 m hurdles, dedicating his achievement to his aunt who died the day before the race. Additional world leads were set in the 5000 m by Yomif Kejelcha (13:04.16) and in the javelin throw by Andreas Hofmann (87.55 m).

== Diamond League results ==
Athletes competing in the Diamond League disciplines earned extra compensation and points which went towards qualifying for one of two Diamond League finals (either Zürich or Brussels depending on the discipline). First place earned 8 points, with each step down in place earning one less point than the previous, until no points are awarded in 9th place or lower.

=== Men ===
100 m (+0.9 m/s)
Place	Athlete	Time	Points
1	Noah Lyles (USA)	9.86 (.852) WL PB	8
2	Christian Coleman (USA)	9.86 (.858) WL	7
3	Akani Simbine (RSA)	9.95	6
4	Reece Prescod (GBR)	9.97	5
5	Su Bingtian (CHN)	10.05	4
6	Xie Zhenye (CHN)	10.09	3
7	Isiah Young (USA)	10.14	2
8	Mike Rodgers (USA)	10.15	1
9	Tyquendo Tracey (JAM)	10.18	0

400 m
Place	Athlete	Time	Points
1	Fred Kerley (USA)	44.81	8
2	Michael Cherry (USA)	45.48	7
3	Nathan Strother (USA)	45.52	6
4	Nathon Allen (JAM)	45.73	5
5	Bralon Taplin (GRN)	45.93	4
6	Wu Yuang (CHN)	47.13	3
	Isaac Makwala (BOT)	Did not finish	0
^{[a]}	Bralon Taplin (GRN)	~~45.93~~	~~4~~

5000 m
Place	Athlete	Time	Points
1	Yomif Kejelcha (ETH)	13:04.16 WL	8
2	Selemon Barega (ETH)	13:04.71	7
3	Hagos Gebrhiwet (ETH)	13:04.83	6
4	Birhanu Balew (BHR)	13:05.04	5
5	Telahun Haile Bekele (ETH)	13:05.94	4
6	Nicholas Kipkorir Kimeli (KEN)	13:06.16 PB	3
7	Joshua Cheptegei (UGA)	13:06.68	2
8	Stanley Waithaka Mburu (KEN)	13:08.97 PB	1
9	Chala Regasa (ETH)	13:12.71	0
10	Richard Yator (KEN)	13:13.24	0
11	Soufiyan Bouqantar (MAR)	13:13.68 PB	0
12	Paul Chelimo (USA)	13:13.94	0
13	Mogos Tuemay (ETH)	13:15.04 PB	0
14	Nibret Melak (ETH)	13:15.35	0
15	Stephen Kissa (UGA)	13:19.85	0
16	Hassan Mead (USA)	13:23.15	0
17	Peng Jianhua (CHN)	14:24.63	0
DNF	Abdelaati Iguider (MAR)	Did not finish	0
DNF (PM)	Cornelius Kiplangat (KEN)	Did not finish (pace maker)	0
DNF (PM)	Bram Som (NED)	Did not finish (pace maker)	0
^{[b]}	Albert Rop (BHR)	~~13:29.88~~	0

110 m hurdles (+0.7 m/s)
Place	Athlete	Time	Points
1	Omar McLeod (JAM)	13.12	8
2	Xie Wenjun (CHN)	13.17	7
3	Sergey Shubenkov (ANA)	13.28 (.278)	6
4	Orlando Ortega (ESP)	13.28 (.279)	5
5	Freddie Crittenden (USA)	13.36	4
6	Andy Pozzi (GBR)	13.39	3
7	Milan Trajkovic (CYP)	13.41	2
8	Antonio Alkana (RSA)	13.47	1
9	Zeng Jianhang (CHN)	13.71	0

400 m hurdles
Place	Athlete	Time	Points
1	Abderrahman Samba (QAT)	47.27 WL MR	8
2	Rai Benjamin (USA)	47.80	7
3	Thomas Barr (IRL)	49.41	6
4	Patryk Dobek (POL)	49.64	5
5	Rasmus Mägi (EST)	50.06	4
6	Takatoshi Abe (JPN)	50.27	3
7	Marcio Teles (BRA)	50.90	2
8	Feng Zhiqiang (CHN)	52.11	1

High jump
Place	Athlete	Time	Points
1	Wang Yu (CHN)	2.28 m	8
2	Maksim Nedasekau (BLR)	2.28 m	7
3	Ilya Ivanyuk (ANA)	2.28 m	6
4	Jeron Robinson (USA)	2.25 m	5
4	Brandon Starc (AUS)	2.25 m	5
4	Jamal Wilson (BAH)	2.25 m	5
7	Majd Eddin Ghazal (SYR)	2.25 m	2
8	Michael Mason (CAN)	2.22 m	1
9	Mateusz Przybylko (GER)	2.22 m	0
10	Bohdan Bondarenko (UKR)	2.19 m	0
NM	Bryan McBride (USA)	No mark	0
DNS	Donald Thomas (BAH)	Did not start	0

Long jump
Place	Athlete	Time	Points
1	Tajay Gayle (JAM)	8.24 m (+0.1 m/s)	8
2	Wang Jianan (CHN)	8.16 m (+0.1 m/s)	7
3	Ruswahl Samaai (RSA)	8.14 m (−0.2 m/s)	6
4	Zhang Yaoguang (CHN)	7.98 m (+0.7 m/s)	5
5	Miltiadis Tentoglou (GRE)	7.97 m (+0.2 m/s)	4
6	Zarck Visser (RSA)	7.90 m (+0.1 m/s)	3
7	Huang Changzhou (CHN)	7.90 m (−0.2 m/s)	2
8	Emiliano Lasa (URU)	7.85 m (+0.2 m/s)	1
9	Zack Bazile (USA)	7.55 m (−0.1 m/s)	0
NM	Damar Forbes (JAM)	No mark	0

Javelin throw
Place	Athlete	Time	Points
1	Andreas Hofmann (GER)	87.55 m WL	8
2	Cheng Chao-tsun (TPE)	87.12 m	7
3	Marcin Krukowski (POL)	84.51 m	6
4	Thomas Röhler (GER)	82.95 m	5
5	Liu Qizhen (CHN)	80.35 m	4
6	Jakub Vadlejch (CZE)	80.00 m	3
7	Julius Yego (KEN)	77.82 m	2
8	Ma Qun (CHN)	74.11 m	1
NM	Petr Frydrych (CZE)	No mark	0

- ^{400 metres} Bralon Taplin of Grenada was disqualified for doping violations.
- ^{5000 metres} Albert Rop of Bahrain was disqualified for doping violations.

=== Women ===
100 m (+0.2 m/s)
Place	Athlete	Time	Points
1	Aleia Hobbs (USA)	11.03	8
2	Blessing Okagbare (NGR)	11.07	7
3	Elaine Thompson (JAM)	11.14	6
4	Vitória Cristina Rosa (BRA)	11.16	5
5	Jenna Prandini (USA)	11.19	4
6	Liang Xiaojing (CHN)	11.22	3
7	Wei Yongli (CHN)	11.40	1
8	Ashley Henderson (USA)	11.53	0
^{[c]}	Michelle-Lee Ahye (TTO)	~~11.23~~	~~2~~

400 m
Place	Athlete	Time	Points
1	Salwa Eid Naser (BHR)	50.65	8
2	Sydney McLaughlin (USA)	50.78	7
3	Christine Botlogetswe (BOT)	51.29	6
4	Stephenie Ann McPherson (JAM)	51.39	5
5	Jessica Beard (USA)	51.40	4
6	Lisanne de Witte (NED)	51.80	3
7	Justyna Święty-Ersetic (POL)	51.85	2
8	Shakima Wimbley (USA)	52.69	1
9	Huang Guifen (CHN)	54.17	0

1500 m
Place	Athlete	Time	Points
1	Rababe Arafi (MAR)	4:01.15 WL	8
2	Gudaf Tsegay (ETH)	4:01.25	7
3	Winnie Nanyondo (UGA)	4:01.39 NR PB	6
4	Dawit Seyaum (ETH)	4:01.40	5
5	Sifan Hassan (NED)	4:01.91	4
6	Axumawit Embaye (ETH)	4:01.95 PB	3
7	Winny Chebet (KEN)	4:02.94	2
8	Alemaz Samuel (ETH)	4:03.79	1
9	Alexa Efraimson (USA)	4:04.53	0
10	Nelly Jepkosgei (KEN)	4:05.07	0
11	Georgia Griffith (AUS)	4:05.39	0
12	Esther Chebet (UGA)	4:07.15	0
13	Zheng Xiaoqian (CHN)	4:15.21	0
14	Emily Lipari (USA)	4:19.94	0
15	Kristiina Mäki (CZE)	4:24.86	0
DNF (PM)	Josephine Chelangat Kiplangat (KEN)	Did not finish (pace maker)	0
DNF (PM)	Morgan Mitchell (AUS)	Did not finish (pace maker)	0

3000 m steeplechase
Place	Athlete	Time	Points
1	Beatrice Chepkoech (KEN)	9:04.53 WL MR	8
2	Celliphine Chepteek Chespol (KEN)	9:11.10	7
3	Peruth Chemutai (UGA)	9:17.78	6
4	Winfred Mutile Yavi (BHR)	9:19.63	5
5	Mercy Chepkurui (KEN)	9:23.59 PB	4
6	Maruša Mišmaš (SLO)	9:29.48	3
7	Geneviève Lalonde (CAN)	9:29.82 NR PB	2
8	Fancy Cherono (KEN)	9:31.00 PB	1
9	Xu Shuangshuang (CHN)	9:33.89 PB	0
10	Luiza Gega (ALB)	9:34.94	0
11	Weynshet Ansa (ETH)	9:43.32	0
12	Mel Lawrence (USA)	9:44.36	0
13	Lucie Sekanová (CZE)	9:49.23	0
14	Özlem Kaya (TUR)	9:58.95	0
DNF (PM)	Viktória Gyürkés (HUN)	Did not finish (pace maker)	0
DNF (PM)	Caroline Tugong (KEN)	Did not finish (pace maker)	0

Pole vault
Place	Athlete	Time	Points
1	Katerina Stefanidi (GRE)	4.72 m	8
2	Nikoleta Kiriakopoulou (GRE)	4.72 m	7
2	Li Ling (CHN)	4.72 m AR NR PB	7
4	Sandi Morris (USA)	4.72 m	5
5	Katie Nageotte (USA)	4.62 m	4
6	Iryna Zhuk (BLR)	4.52 m	3
7	Alysha Newman (CAN)	4.52 m	2
8	Holly Bradshaw (GBR)	4.42 m	1
9	Annie Rhodes-Johnigan (USA)	4.42 m	0
10	Xu Huiqin (CHN)	4.27 m	0
NM	Kristen Leland (USA)	No mark	0

Shot put
Place	Athlete	Time	Points
1	Chase Ealey (USA)	19.58 m	8
2	Gong Lijiao (CHN)	19.44 m	7
3	Aliona Dubitskaya (BLR)	18.78 m	6
4	Jessica Ramsey (USA)	18.61 m	5
5	Danniel Thomas-Dodd (JAM)	18.54 m	4
6	Maggie Ewen (USA)	18.48 m	3
7	Fanny Roos (SWE)	18.30 m	2
8	Paulina Guba (POL)	17.86 m	1
9	Anita Márton (HUN)	17.65 m	0
10	Daniella Hill (USA)	17.36 m	0
11	Bian Ka (CHN)	16.79 m	0

Javelin throw
Place	Athlete	Time	Points
1	Lyu Huihui (CHN)	66.89 m MR	8
2	Līna Mūze (LAT)	64.87 m PB	7
3	Christin Hussong (GER)	64.10 m	6
4	Madara Palameika (LAT)	62.45 m	5
5	Nikola Ogrodníková (CZE)	61.68 m	4
6	Kelsey-Lee Barber (AUS)	61.40 m	3
7	Ariana Ince (USA)	60.26 m	2
8	Sunette Viljoen (RSA)	57.56 m	1
NM	Tatsiana Khaladovich (BLR)	No mark	0

- ^{[c]} Michelle-Lee Ahye of Trinidad and Tobago was disqualifed for doping violations.

== Non-Diamond League results ==
=== Men ===
Event	First		Second		Third	
200 m (±0.0 m/s)	Aaron Brown (CAN)	20.07	Andre De Grasse (CAN)	20.21	Clarence Munyai (RSA)	20.37

=== Chinese mini men/boys ===
Event	First		Second		Third	
100 m (+1.8 m/s)	Li Lian Hong	10.72	Zeng Hai Long	10.79	Liu Hang	10.86
800 m	Wang Bing Bing	1:59.85	Chen Xi Fa	2:00.61	Li Jian Ping	2:03.30
110 m hurdles (+1.4 m/s)	Fan Sheng Cong	15.27	Zhang Chen	15.41	Zhu Jun	15.87
4×100 m relay	Guangxi	42.08	Luoyang	42.95	Liuzhou	42.96

=== Chinese mini women/girls ===
Event	First		Second		Third	
200 m (+1.2 m/s)	Pan Yue	25.82	Yuan Ke Xin	26.17	Zhi Hou Ming	27.39
400 m	Bi Ning Ning	58.30	Li Zi Wei	1:08.09	Liu Xin	1:17.60
4×100 m relay	Nantong	48.49	Shanghai	48.83	Suzhou	49.17

=== Chinese mixed ===
Event	First		Second		Third	
Medley relay	Shanghai Sports University	11:37.51	Old Friends 2	11:50.26	Old Soldiers	11:59.70

== See also ==
- 2019 Doha Diamond League (first/previous Diamond League meet)
- 2019 Weltklasse Zürich (first half of the Diamond League final)
- 2019 Memorial Van Damme (second half of the Diamond League final)
