= 2024 African Championships in Athletics – Women's 3000 metres steeplechase =

Women's 3000 metres steeplechase at the 2024 African Championships in Athletics
- Venue: Japoma Stadium
- Location: Douala, Cameroon
- Dates: 26 June 2024
- Competitors: 7 from 4 nations
- Winning time: 9:24.47

Medalists
gold medal	Loice Chekwemoi	Uganda
silver medal	Alemnat Wale	Ethiopia
bronze medal	Leah Jeruto	Kenya

The women's 3000 metres steeplechase event at the 2024 African Championships in Athletics was held on 26 June 2024 in Douala, Cameroon.

== Records ==
Records before the 2024 African Athletics Championships
Record	Athlete (nation)	Time (s)	Location	Date
World record	Beatrice Chepkoech (KEN)	8:44.32	Fontvieille, Monaco	20 July 2018
African record	Beatrice Chepkoech (KEN)	8:44.32	Fontvieille, Monaco	20 July 2018
Championship record	Beatrice Chepkoech (KEN)	8:59.88	Asaba, Nigeria	5 August 2018
World leading	Peruth Chemutai (UGA)	8:55.09	Eugene, United States	25 May 2024
African leading	Peruth Chemutai (UGA)	8:55.09	Eugene, United States	25 May 2024

== Results ==
Rank	Athlete	Nationality	Time	Notes
1st place, gold medalist(s)	Loice Chekwemoi	Uganda	9:24.47	
2nd place, silver medalist(s)	Alemnat Wale	Ethiopia	9:35.19	
3rd place, bronze medalist(s)	Leah Jeruto	Kenya	9:36.33	
4	Meseret Yeshaneh	Ethiopia	9:40.65	
5	Ikram Ouaaziz	Morocco	9:48.05	
6	Mercy Wanjiru Gitahi	Kenya	9:52.75	
7	Wosane Asefa	Ethiopia	10:04.65	

== See also ==
- Athletics at the 2023 African Games – Women's 3000 metres steeplechase
