= Chepkirui =

Chepkirui, or Chepkurui, is a female name of Kalenjinn origin of Kenya meaning born at night. It may refer to:

- Caroline Chepkurui (born 1990), Kenyan steeplechase runner
- Eunice Chepkirui (born 1984), Kenyan-born Bahraini long-distance runner
- Joyce Chepkirui (born 1988), Kenyan middle- and long-distance runner
- Lineth Chepkurui (born 1988), Kenyan long-distance runner
- Lydiah Chepkurui (born 1984), Kenyan steeplechase runner and 2013 World Championships medallist
- Mercy Chepkurui (born 2000), Kenyan steeplechase runner
- Sheila Chepkirui (born 1990), Kenyan middle- and long-distance runner

== See also ==
- Kipkirui, related name meaning "son of Kirui"
