= Sembo Almayew =

Ethiopian steeplechase runner

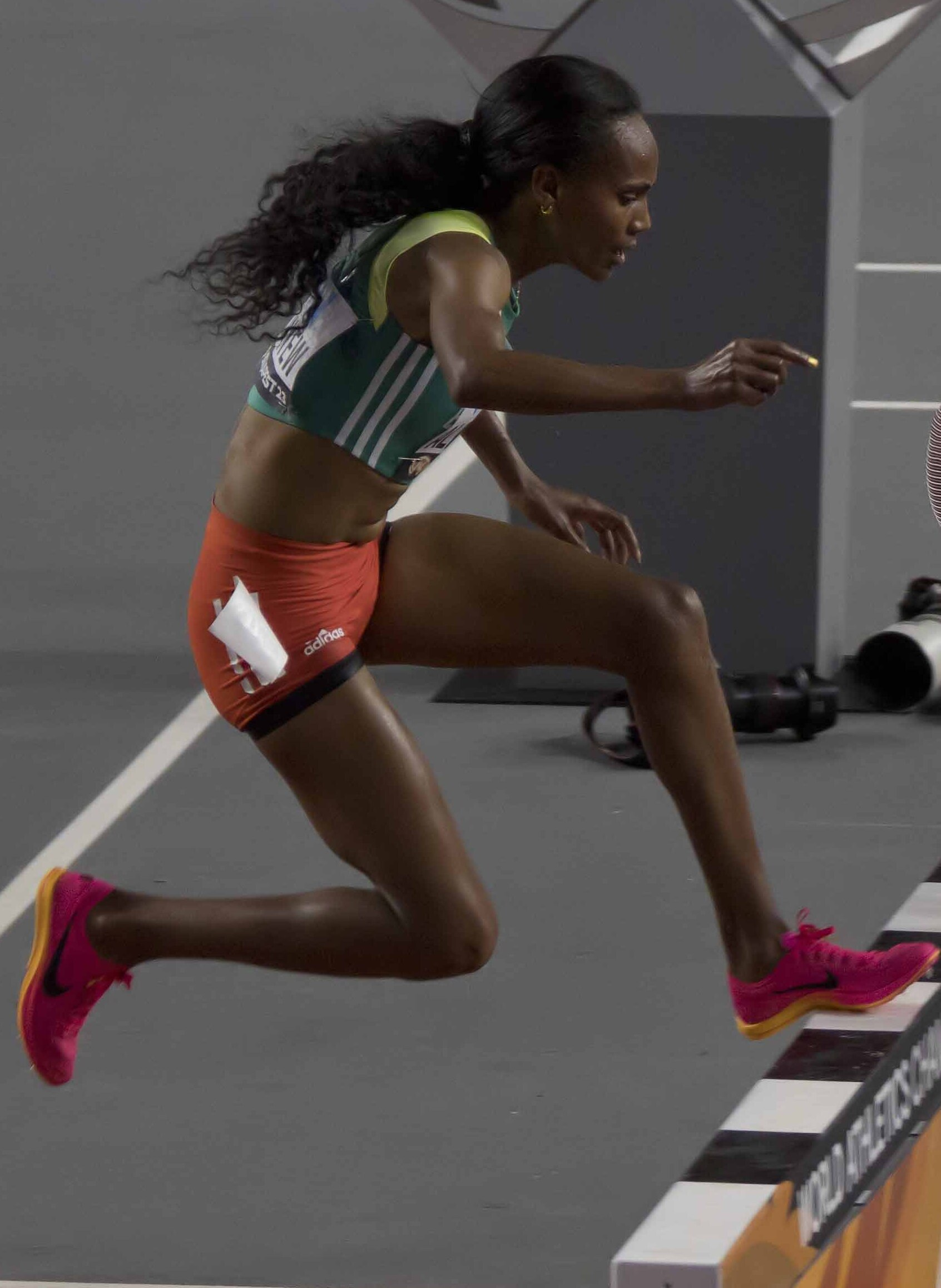
- Sembo Almayew in 2023

Personal information
- Full name: Sembo Almayew Welteji
- Nationality: Ethiopian
- Born: 24 January 2005 (age 21) Midakegn, Oromia, Ethiopia

Sport
- Country: Ethiopia
- Sport: Athletics
- Event: 3000 metres steeplechase

Achievements and titles
- Personal bests: 3000 metres: 8:35.04 (Val-de-Reuil 2023); 3000 m st: 8:59.90 (Eugene 2025)
Medal record
Women's athletics
Representing Ethiopia
World Championships
Bronze medal – third place	2025 Tokyo	3000 m st.
World U20 Championships
Gold medal – first place	2024 Lima	3000 m st.
Silver medal – second place	2022 Cali	3000 m st.

Sembo Almayew Welteji (born 24 January 2005) is an Ethiopian track and field athlete. She was a silver medalist at the 2022 World Athletics U20 Championships in the women's 3000 metres steeplechase.

== Career ==
=== 2022 ===
Almayew set new world under-18 best times for the 3000m steeplechase in 2022. She beat the previous U18 best of 9:24.73, set by Kenya's Celliphine Chespol in 2016, when she clocked a 9:18.98 at the FBK Games, a World Athletics Continental Tour Gold meeting, in Hengelo.

Almayew then ran 9:09.19 to finish second at the Diamond League meeting in Paris in June 2022 in the 3000m steeplechase to lower her personal best and the world under-18 best time. Competing at the 2022 World Athletics Championships in Eugene, Oregon she ran 9:21.10 to finish fifth in her heat.

She was a silver medalist behind Faith Cherotich at the 2022 World Athletics U20 Championships in the Women's 3000 metres steeplechase.

=== 2023 ===
Almayew ran 9:05.83 to set a new personal best and national under-20 record at the Doha meeting of the Diamond League in May 2023, finishing second behind Kenyan Beatrice Chepkoech. The following month, Almayew set a new personal best and meeting record time of 9:00.71 to win the 3000 m steeplechase at the Diamond League meeting in Florence on 2 June 2023.

Competing in the 3000m steeplechase at the 2023 World Athletics Championships in Budapest, she qualified for the final, finishing second in her heat. In the final, she finished in thirteenth place.

=== 2024 ===
She finished in fifth place at the 2024 Summer Olympics in the Women's 3000 metres steeplechase. In August 2024, she won gold at the 2024 World Athletics U20 Championships in the 3000 metres steeplechase, setting a new championship record time of 9:12.71. She was named Women's Rising Star at the World Athletics Awards in December 2024.

=== 2025 ===
She finished third in the 3000m steeplechase in May 2025 at the 2025 Doha Diamond League. In June 2025, she ran a time of 9:01.22 to finish third at the 2025 Meeting de Paris. She ran a personal best 8:59.90 at the 2025 Prefontaine Classic on 5 July. She was runner-up to Doris Lemngole in 9:20.39 in the 3000m steeplechase at the 2025 Athletissima event in Lausanne, in wet conditions. In July 2025, she named for the Ethiopian team for the 3000 metres steeplechase at the 2025 World Athletics Championships in Tokyo, Japan, where she qualified for the final of the 3000 metres steeplechase.
