= 2018 IAAF World U20 Championships – Women's 3000 metres steeplechase =

Women's 3000 metres steeplechase at the 2018 World U20 Championships
- Venue: Ratina Stadium
- Dates: 10 July (heats); 13 July (final)
- Competitors: 40 from 27 nations
- Winning time: 9:12.78

Medalists
gold medal	Celliphine Chespol	Kenya
silver medal	Peruth Chemutai	Uganda
bronze medal	Winfred Mutile Yavi	Bahrain

The women's 3000 metres steeplechase at the 2018 IAAF World U20 Championships was held at Ratina Stadium on 10 and 13 July.

== Records ==
Standing records prior to the 2018 IAAF World U20 Championships
World U20 Record	Celliphine Chespol (KEN)	8:58.78	Eugene, United States	26 May 2017
Championship Record	Celliphine Chespol (KEN)	9:25.15	Bydgoszcz, Poland	22 July 2016
World U20 Leading	Celliphine Chespol (KEN)	9:01.82	Paris, France	30 June 2018

== Results ==
=== Heats ===
Qualification: First 3 of each heat ( Q ) and the 6 fastest times ( q ) qualified for the final. The overall results were as follows:

Rank	Heat	Name	Nationality	Time	Note
1	3	Peruth Chemutai	Uganda	9:34.34	Q
2	1	Celliphine Chespol	Kenya	9:45.60	Q
3	3	Mercy Chepkurui	Kenya	9:50.05	Q
4	2	Winfred Mutile Yavi	Bahrain	9:52.23	Q
5	3	Etalemahu Sintayehu	Ethiopia	9:52.92	Q, PB
6	1	Montanna McAvoy	Australia	9:59.67	Q, PB
7	2	Agrie Belachew	Ethiopia	9:59.95	Q, SB
8	1	Manami Nishiyama	Japan	10:02.89	Q, PB
9	1	Derya Kunur	Turkey	10:05.60	q, NJR
10	3	Lisa Oed	Germany	10:07.79	q, SB
11	1	Lisa Vogelgesang	Germany	10:08.17	q
12	2	Kristlin Gear	United States	10:09.08	Q
13	1	Alice Hill	United States	10:09.15	q, PB
14	2	Brielle Erbacher	Australia	10:09.43	q, PB
15	1	Grace Fetherstonhaugh	Canada	10:09.60	q
16	1	Famke Heinst	Netherlands	10:12.42	
17	3	Astrid Snäll	Finland	10:12.67	PB
18	3	Ikram Ouaaziz	Morocco	10:13.97	PB
19	1	Jenipher Contois	France	10:15.89	PB
20	1	Sandra Šrut	Croatia	10:19.80	NU20R
21	2	Parami Wasanthi Maristela	Sri Lanka	10:20.12	NU20R
22	2	Andrea Kolbeinsdóttir	Iceland	10:21.26	NU20R
23	2	Jasmijn Bakker	Netherlands	10:24.28	
24	2	Ludovica Cavalli	Italy	10:24.41	PB
25	2	Laura Dickinson	Canada	10:24.64	SB
26	3	Emilie Renaud	France	10:27.56	
27	2	Tian Wanhua	China	10:28.52	
28	1	Tíra Pavuk	Hungary	10:31.40	PB
29	2	Holly Page	United Kingdom	10:35.36	
30	2	Salla Laukkanen	Finland	10:36.38	PB
31	2	Yonca Kutluk	Turkey	10:36.97	PB
32	2	Anna Mark Helwigh	Denmark	10:37.59	
33	1	June Arbeo	Spain	10:38.52	
34	3	Sibylle Häring	Switzerland	10:38.85	
35	3	Yuka Nosue	Japan	10:39.24	
36	3	Boglárka Mógor	Hungary	10:43.79	
37	3	Marwa Bou Ghanmi	Tunisia	10:44.23	
38	3	Linda Palumbo	Italy	10:44.68	
39	1	Clara Macarena Baiocchi	Argentina	10:44.92	
40	3	Karin Gošek	Slovenia	10:57.31	

=== Final ===
Rank	Name	Nationality	Time	Note
1st place, gold medalist(s)	Celliphine Chespol	Kenya	9:12.78	CR
2nd place, silver medalist(s)	Peruth Chemutai	Uganda	9:18.87	
3rd place, bronze medalist(s)	Winfred Mutile Yavi	Bahrain	9:23.47	
4	Mercy Chepkurui	Kenya	9:43.65	
5	Agrie Belachew	Ethiopia	9:44.79	SB
6	Ethlemahu Sintayehu	Ethiopia	9:50.96	PB
7	Alice Hill	United States	9:57.04	PB
8	Lisa Oed	Germany	9:57.45	PB
9	Manami Nishiyama	Japan	10:00.49	PB
10	Kristlin Gear	United States	10:00.99	
11	Grace Fetherstonhaugh	Canada	10:02.28	
12	Derya Kunur	Turkey	10:03.46	NJR
13	Montanna McAvoy	Australia	10:06.37	
14	Lisa Vogelgesang	Germany	10:07.67	
15	Brielle Erbacher	Australia	10:16.84	
