= 2024 World Athletics U20 Championships – Women's 3000 metres steeplechase =

Women's 3000 metres steeplechase at the 2024 World Athletics U20 Championships
- Venue: Estadio Atlético de la VIDENA
- Dates: 27 August 2024 (heats); 29 August 2024 (final)
- Competitors: 28 from 19 nations
- Winning time: 9:12.71

Medalists
gold medal	Sembo Almayew	Ethiopia
silver medal	Loice Chekwemoi	Uganda
bronze medal	Diana Chepkemoi	Kenya

The women's 3000 metres steeplechase at the 2024 World Athletics U20 Championships was held at the Estadio Atlético de la VIDENA in Lima, Peru on 27 and 29 August 2024.

== Records ==
U20 standing records prior to the 2024 World Athletics U20 Championships were as follows:

Record	Athlete & Nationality	Mark	Location	Date
World U20 Record	Celliphine Chespol (KEN)	8:58.78	Eugene, United States	26 May 2017
Championship Record	Celliphine Chespol (KEN)	9:12.78	Tampere, Finland	13 July 2018
World U20 Leading	Sembo Almayew (ETH)	9:00.84	Paris, France	6 August 2024

== Results ==
=== Heats ===
The first 8 athletes in each heat (Q) qualified to the final.

==== Heat 1 ====
Rank	Athlete	Nation	Time	Notes
1	Firehiwot Gesese	Ethiopia	10:00.96	Q
2	Loice Chekwemoi	Uganda	10:01.85	Q
3	Sharon Chepkemoi	Kenya	10:07.59	Q, PB
4	Angelina Napoleon	United States	10:17.12	Q
5	Karolína Jarošová	Czech Republic	10:25.32	Q
6	Lowa Branth	Sweden	10:25.38	Q
7	Jule Lindner	Germany	10:26.74	Q
8	Sofia Peña	Mexico	10:33.03	Q, NU20R
9	Andriana Bontioti	Greece	10:40.82	
10	Stela Fernandes	Portugal	10:41.68	
11	Ludovica Ferro	Italy	10:48.65	
12	Ekta Dey	India	10:50.09	
13	Allegra McGivern	Australia	10:52.31	
14	Astrid Van Breedam	Belgium	10:59.78	

==== Heat 2 ====
Rank	Athlete	Nation	Time	Notes
1	Sembo Almayew	Ethiopia	9:30.59	Q
2	Diana Chepkemoi	Kenya	9:47.97	Q, PB
3	Nancy Chepkwurui	Uganda	9:49.06	Q
4	Ebba Cronholm	Sweden	10:12.29	Q
5	Adia Budde	Germany	10:12.51	Q
6	Katie Clute	United States	10:12.74	Q
7	Mejra Mehmedović	Serbia	10:14.13	Q, PB
8	Mia Toohey	Australia	10:23.87	Q, PB
9	Dilshoda Usmanova	Uzbekistan	10:26.94	SB
10	Laura Camargo	Colombia	10:32.05	PB
11	Hannah Enkels	Belgium	10:34.62	
12	Elena Ribigini	Italy	10:37.44	
13	Alison Guaman	Ecuador	10:40.96	
14	Russell Cjuro	Peru	11:14.57	

=== Final ===
Rank	Athlete	Nation	Time	Notes
1st place, gold medalist(s)	Sembo Almayew	Ethiopia	9:12.71	CR
2nd place, silver medalist(s)	Loice Chekwemoi	Uganda	9:18.84	PB
3rd place, bronze medalist(s)	Diana Chepkemoi	Kenya	9:29.84	PB
4	Frehiwot Gesese	Ethiopia	9:34.50	
5	Nancy Chepkwurui	Uganda	9:47.47	PB
6	Adia Budde	Germany	9:49.11	PB
7	Sharon Chepkemoi	Kenya	9:50.30	PB
8	Karolína Jarošová	Czech Republic	9:52.84	NU20R
9	Ebba Cronholm	Sweden	9:54.81	NU20R
10	Angelina Napoleon	United States	9:58.58	
11	Katie Clute	United States	10:07.61	
12	Jule Lindner	Germany	10:09.73	PB
13	Mia Toohey	Australia	10:17.70	PB
14	Mejra Mehmedović	Serbia	10:19.26	
15	Lowa Branth	Sweden	10:25.98	
16	Sofia Peña	Mexico	10:40.10	
