= Ikram Ouaaziz =

Moroccan long-distance runner

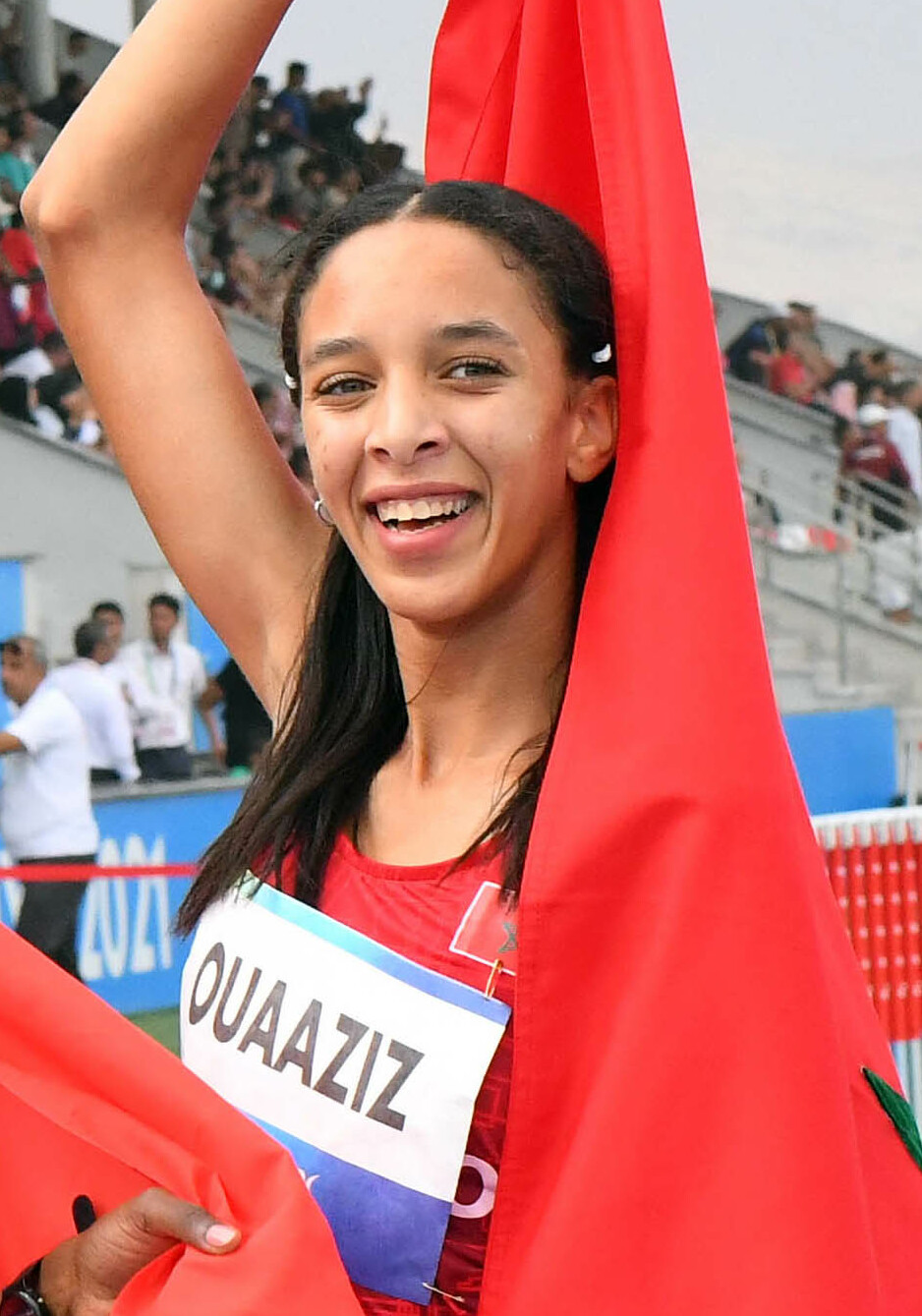
- Ouaaziz at the 2021 Islamic Solidarity Games (held in 2022, Konya)

Personal information
- Born: 6 July 1999 (age 27)

Sport
- Sport: Track and field

Achievements and titles
- Personal best: 9:32.81 minutes (2026)
Medal record
Mediterranean Games
Bronze medal – third place	2022 Oran	3000 m steeplechase

Ikram Ouaaziz (Arabic: إكرام وعزيز, romanized: Ikrām Waʻzīz; born 6 July 1999) is a Moroccan long-distance runner who specializes in the 3000 metres steeplechase.

== Career ==
In the age-specific categories, she became Moroccan junior champion and competed at the 2018 World U20 Championships without reaching the final.

In 2019 she became Moroccan champion for the first time, in the 5000 metres event. She would take back-to-back titles in this event in 2021, 2022, 2023, 2024 and 2025.

She won the silver medal at the 2019 Arab Championships, finished fifth at the 2019 African Games, fifth at the 2022 African Championships and took bronze medals at both the 2022 Mediterranean Games and the 2021 Islamic Solidarity Games (held in 2022). She also finished ninth at the 2022 Arab Cross Country Championships and finished fourth in the 5000 metres at the 2022 Mediterranean Games.

In 2023 she finished seventh at the Arab Cross Country Championships, seventh in the relay event at the 2023 World Cross Country Championships, in addition to winning three medals in the steeplechase: gold at the 2023 Arab Championships, bronze at the 2023 Arab Games and another gold at the 2023 Jeux de la Francophonie.

She fininished fifth at the 2024 African Championships and won the bronze medal at the 2025 Islamic Solidarity Games.
