= 2022 World Athletics U20 Championships – Women's 3000 metres steeplechase =

Women's 3000 metres steeplechase at the 2022 World Athletics U20 Championships
- Venue: Estadio Olímpico Pascual Guerrero
- Dates: 1 August (heats); 4 August (final)
- Competitors: 26 from 21 nations
- Winning time: 9:16.14

Medalists
gold medal	Faith Cherotich	Kenya
silver medal	Sembo Almayew	Ethiopia
bronze medal	Meseret Yeshaneh	Ethiopia

The women's 3000 metres steeplechase at the 2022 World Athletics U20 Championships was held at the Estadio Olímpico Pascual Guerrero in Cali, Colombia on 1 and 4 August 2022.

27 athletes from 21 countries were originally entered to the competition. Since only two athletes per member nation can compete in each event, the third steeplechase runner entered by the United States, Addison Stevenson, was unable to compete reducing the number of athletes to 26.

== Records ==
U20 standing records prior to the 2022 World Athletics U20 Championships were as follows:

Record	Athlete & Nationality	Mark	Location	Date
World U20 Record	Celliphine Chespol (KEN)	8:58.78	Eugene, United States	26 May 2017
Championship Record	Celliphine Chespol (KEN)	9:12.78	Tampere, Finland	13 July 2018
World U20 Leading	Sembo Almayew (ETH)	9:09.19	Paris, France	18 June 2022

== Results ==
=== Round 1 ===
Round 1 took place on 1 August, with the 26 athletes involved being split into 2 heats of 13 athletes. The first 5 athletes in each heat ( Q ) and the next 5 fastest ( q ) qualified to the final. The overall results were as follows:

Rank	Heat	Name	Nationality	Time	Note
1	2	Faith Cherotich	Kenya	9:38.18	Q
2	2	Meseret Yeshaneh	Ethiopia	9:41.99	Q
3	1	Sembo Almayew	Ethiopia	9:52.65	Q
4	1	Pamela Kosgei	Kenya	10:09.89	Q
5	1	Loice Chekwemoi	Uganda	10:10.82	Q, PB
6	2	Rihab Dhahri	Tunisia	10:13.49	Q
7	1	Gréta Varga	Hungary	10:21.72	Q
8	1	Marta Serrano	Spain	10:23.03	Q
9	1	Verónica Huacasi	Peru	10:27.81	q
10	2	Khadija Ennasri	Morocco	10:29.86	Q
11	2	Carolin Hinrichs	Germany	10:34.57	Q
12	2	Karrie Baloga	United States	10:35.33	q
13	2	Harper McClain	United States	10:37.05	q
14	2	Agnese Carcano	Italy	10:37.08	q
15	1	Mihaela Maria Blaga	Romania	10:37.77	q
16	2	Iva Gieselová	Czech Republic	10:42.66	
17	1	Regina Piechowska	Poland	10:44.72	
18	1	Pelinsu Şahin	Turkey	10:55.87	
19	1	Vasiliki Kallimogianni	Greece	10:58.34	
20	1	Sigrid Alvik	Norway	11:02.79	
21	2	Gabriela de Freitas	Brazil	11:06.73	
22	2	Julia Rath	Germany	11:16.69	
	1	Aarti Miescher	Switzerland	DNF	
	2	Emily Morden	Australia	DNF	
	2	Laura McKillop	Australia	DNF	
	1	Tetiana Kohut	Ukraine	DNF	

=== Final ===
The final (originally scheduled at 17:20) was started at 17:23 on 4 August. The results were as follows:

Rank	Name	Nationality	Time	Note
1st place, gold medalist(s)	Faith Cherotich	Kenya	9:16.14	
2nd place, silver medalist(s)	Sembo Almayew	Ethiopia	9:30.41	
3rd place, bronze medalist(s)	Meseret Yeshaneh	Ethiopia	9:42.02	
4	Rihab Dhahri	Tunisia	10:06.42	
5	Pamela Kosgei	Kenya	10:06.46	
6	Loice Chekwemoi	Uganda	10:07.79	PB
7	Marta Serrano	Spain	10:08.85	
8	Gréta Varga	Hungary	10:18.63	
9	Carolin Hinrichs	Germany	10:29.66	
10	Verónica Huacasi	Peru	10:33.64	
11	Karrie Baloga	United States	10:34.28	
12	Harper McClain	United States	10:37.58	
13	Agnese Carcano	Italy	10:39.25	
14	Mihaela Maria Blaga	Romania	10:50.24	
	Khadija Ennasri	Morocco	DNF	
