= Mercy Chepkurui =

Kenyan steeplechase runner

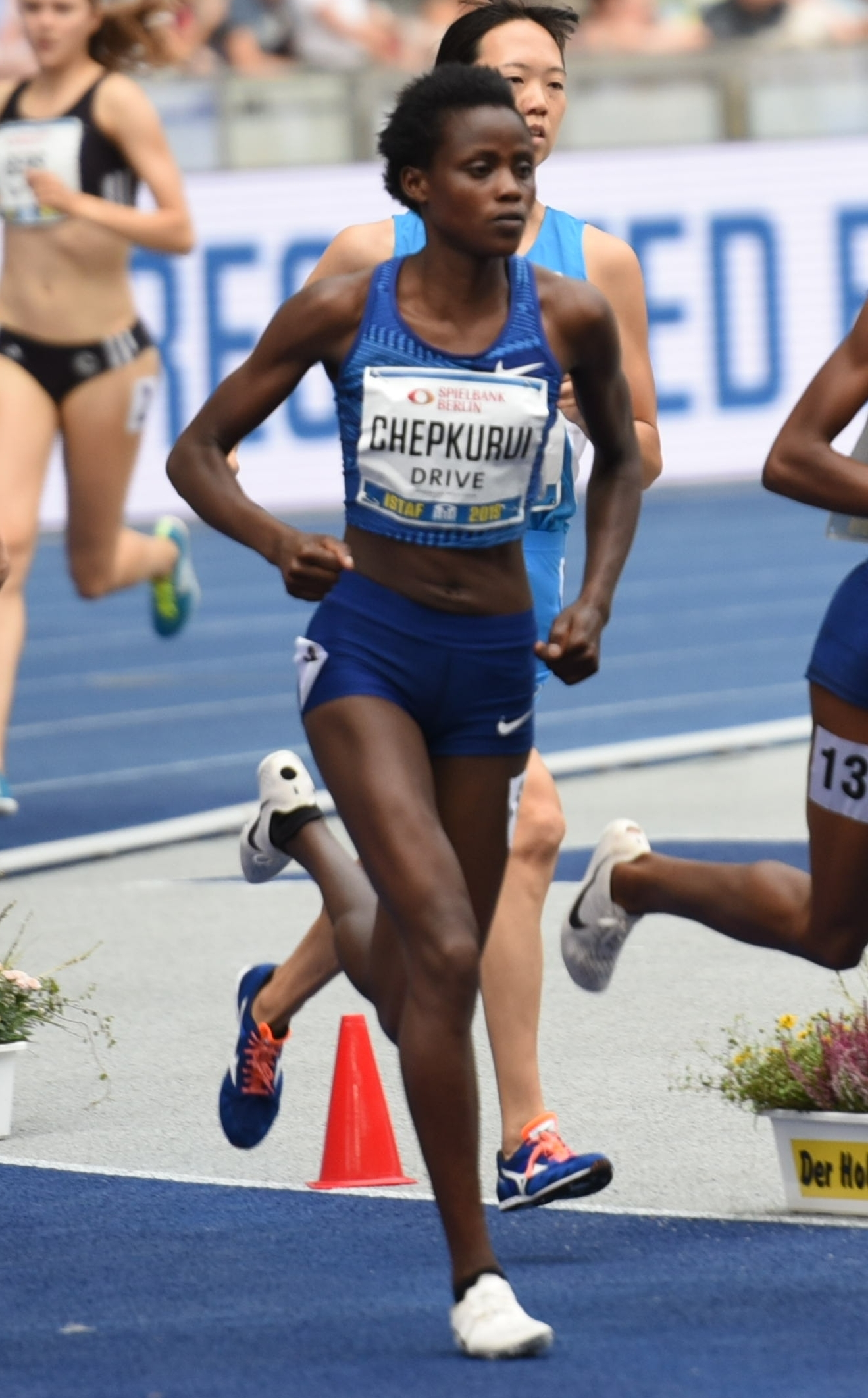
- Chepkurui at the 2019 ISTAF Berlin meeting

Personal information
- Nationality: Kenya
- Born: 16 September 2000 (age 25)
- Home town: Tinet Ward, Kuresoi South Constituency, Nakuru County, Kenya

Sport
- Sport: Athletics
- Events: 3000 metres steeplechase, 3000 metres
- College team: Middle Tennessee Blue Raiders

Achievements and titles
- National finals: 2019 Kenyan U20 XC; • 6 km, 9th; 2019 Kenyan Champs; • 3000m s'chase, 5th
- Personal bests: 3000mSC: 9:23.59 (2019); 3000m: 8:56.35 i (2020)
Medal record
Women's athletics
Representing Kenya
World U18 Championships
Silver medal – second place	2017 Nairobi	2000 m steeplechase

Mercy Chepkurui (born 16 September 2000), also spelled Mercy Chepkirui, is a Kenyan steeplechase runner. She was the silver medalist in the 2000 m steeplechase at the 2017 World U20 Championships. As a senior athlete, her time of 6:00.31 in that event indoors makes her the 8th-fastest 2000 m steeplechase performer of all time.

== Biography ==
Chepkurui attended Tinet High School in the Kuresoi South Constituency of Nakuru County, Kenya.

In 2017, Chepkurui won the 2000 m steeplechase at the Kenyan U18 Trials in a world U18-leading time of 6:27.6, earning her a spot on the Kenyan team at the 2017 IAAF World U18 Championships. At the championships, Chepkurui held a strong lead going in to the final lap, but she tumbled on the final water barrier putting compatriot Caren Chebet into contention. After being passed by Chebet, Chepkurui re-took the lead until 20 metres to the finish, when Chebet passed her again to win the world U18 title while Chepkurui took silver.

The following year, Chepkurui competed at the 2018 IAAF World U20 Championships, this time at the standard 3000 m steeplechase distance. She qualified for the final and placed 4th behind Celliphine Chespol (who was the second-fastest performer of all time), future Olympic gold medalist Peruth Chemutai, and future World champion Winfred Yavi.

In 2019, Chepkurui joined the Middle Tennessee Blue Raiders track and field team. She competed with the Blue Raiders through the 2023 season, with a best regional placing of 55th at the 2021 NCAA Division I South Region Cross Country Championships.

== Statistics ==
=== Personal bests ===
Event	Mark	Place	Competition	Venue	Date
3000 metres steeplechase	9:23.59	5th	Shanghai Diamond League	Shanghai, China	18 May 2019
3000 metres	8:56.35 i	7th	Meeting Elite en Salle Féminin du Val d'Oise	Eaubonne, France	17 February 2020
