= 2022 African Championships in Athletics – Women's 3000 metres steeplechase =

The women's 3000 metres steeplechase event at the 2022 African Championships in Athletics was held on 12 June in Port Louis, Mauritius.

== Results ==
Rank	Athlete	Nationality	Time	Notes
1st place, gold medalist(s)	Werkuha Getachew	Ethiopia	9:36.81	
2nd place, silver medalist(s)	Zerfe Wondmagegn	Ethiopia	9:41.37	
3rd place, bronze medalist(s)	Caren Chebet	Kenya	9:43.64	
4	Edinah Chepkemoi	Kenya	9:44.21	
5	Ikram Ouaziz	Morocco	9:53.06	
6	Fancy Cherono	Kenya	10:06.62	
