= 2018 African Championships in Athletics – Women's 3000 metres steeplechase =

The women's 3000 metres steeplechase event at the 2018 African Championships in Athletics was held on 5 August in Asaba, Nigeria.

== Results ==
Rank	Athlete	Nationality	Time	Notes
1st place, gold medalist(s)	Beatrice Chepkoech	Kenya	8:59.88	CR
2nd place, silver medalist(s)	Celliphine Chespol	Kenya	9:09.61	
3rd place, bronze medalist(s)	Fancy Cherono	Kenya	9:23.92	
4	Weynshet Ansa	Ethiopia	9:27.03	
5	Peruth Chemutai	Uganda	9:45.42	
6	Ethlemahu Sintayehu	Ethiopia	9:53.18	
7	Agrie Belachew	Ethiopia	10:32.88	
	Cherise Sims	South Africa	??:??.??	
