= Reed Fischer =

American long-distance runner

Personal information
- Nationality: American
- Born: September 9, 1995 (age 30)

Sport
- Country: United States
- Sport: Athletics
- Events: 10000 metres, Half Marathon, Marathon

Achievements and titles
- Personal bests: 10-mile: 46:40 Half marathon: 1:00:54 Marathon: 2:10:14
Medal record
Men's athletics
Representing the United States
NACAC Championships
Bronze medal – third place	2018 Toronto	10,000 m

Reed Fischer (born July 9, 1995) is an American long-distance runner who won bronze in the 10,000-meter race at the 2018 NACAC Championships. Fischer was later selected for the American team in the 2023 World Athletics Half Marathon Championship.

== Career ==
Fischer ran for Hopkins High School in Minnesota as a young athlete. He finished 10th at state before moving on to college, where he was a walk-on at Drake University.

At Drake, he became a factor for the Bulldogs in cross country and track. He went to the NCAA Division I Cross Country Championships in 2016, and the Outdoor Track Championships in the 10,000m during the 2016 and 2017 seasons.

He competed for the US in the 10,000 meters and won bronze in Toronto, Canada, during the 2018 NACAC Games. Lopez Lomong won gold and set the track record in the process.

In 2019, he took first in the Drake Relays 5,000 meters.

Fischer ran a 1:01:51 half marathon in Germany, placing 10th at the ADIZERO: Roads to Records competition.

At the 2021 Chicago Marathon, he finished 9th in 2:14:41. At the 2022 Boston Marathon, he was 16th in 2:10:54. He finished 10th in the 2022 New York City Marathon in a time of 2:15:23.

2023

Fischer was one of three Americans to compete at the 2023 World Athletics Road Running Championships, but he hurt his calf during the race and finished 53rd in 1:03:56.

2024

On February 3, 2024, Fischer finished 9th at the 2024 United States Olympic trials (marathon) with a time of 2:11:34.

On March 17, 2024, Fischer finished 5th at the New York City Half Marathon with a time of 1:03:06.

On April 24, 2024, Fischer finished 19th in the 10k at the ADIZERO: Roads to Records competition, with a time of 29:20.

On October 13, 2024, Fischer finished 11th overall and 3rd American at the Chicago Marathon, with a new personal best of 2:10:14.

== Notable marathon results ==
Results taken from IAAF Profile

Year	Race	Place	Time
2020	US Olympic Marathon Trials	97th	2:24:48
2021	Boston Marathon	16th	2:14:41
2022	New York City Marathon	10th	2:15:23
2022	Boston Marathon	16th	2:10:54
2024	US Olympic Marathon Trials	9th	2:11:34
2024	Chicago Marathon	13th	2:10:14
2025	Boston Marathon	21st	2:12:40
