= Pamela Kosgei =

Kenyan athlete (born 2004)

Personal information
- Nationality: Kenyan
- Born: 5 July 2004 (age 22)

Sport
- Sport: Athletics
- Event: 3000m Steeplechase

Achievements and titles
- Personal bests: Mile: 4:36.70 (Albuquerque, 2025); 3000m: 8:43.86 (Fayetteville, 2026); 5000m: 14:52.45 (Azusa, 2025); 10,000m: 30:49.99 (Stanford, 2026); 3000m Steeplechase: 9:15.93 (Palo Alto, 2025)
Medal record
Women's athletics
Representing Kenya
World Cross Country Championships
Silver medal – second place	2023 Bathurst	Junior team
Silver medal – second place	2023 Bathurst	Junior race
African U20 Championships
Gold medal – first place	2023 Ndola	3000m st.

Pamela Kosgei (born 5 July 2004) is a Kenyan track and field and cross-country athlete. In 2023, she became the Africa Under-20 champion, and the Kenyan senior national champion, at the 3000m Steeplechase. She committed to compete for the University of New Mexico at the NCAA level, starting with the 2024 Cross Country season and won the 10,000 metres at the 2025 NCAA Outdoor Championships.

== Career ==
=== 2022 ===
In 2022 she became the Kenyan U18 champion at the 3000m steeplechase. She represented her country at the World Under 20 Athletics Championships held in Cali, Colombia and finished in fifth place in the 3000m steeplechase race. She won the 5000m race at the East Africa School Games in Arusha, Tanzania on September 20, 2022. She won her first ever European race at the Cardiff Cross Challenge, held in Cardiff, Wales on 15 October 2022.

=== 2023 ===
On 18 February 2023 Kosgei won silver at the 2023 World Athletics Cross Country Championships in the U20 women's race, finishing behind Ethiopians Medina Eisa and Senayet Getachew (originally finished second, however Eisa was later given a two-year ban for age falsification violations and stripped of her silver medal).

In 2023, she became the Africa Under-20 3000m Steeplechase champion. On 24 June 2023, she also won the Athletics Kenya National Championships at that distance.

=== 2024 ===
In 2024, she moved to the U.S. and began taking summer classes at University of New Mexico with the intention of competing for the Lobos in Cross Country in the Fall of 2024. In a New Mexico uniform, she ran a new personal best of 9:28.88 at the Portland Track Festival, taking second place to Allie Ostrander. In October 2024, she broke the course record set by Parker Valby to win the 2024 Wisconsin Pre-Nationals at the Thomas Zimmer Championship Cross Country Course in Madison. In November 2024, she was runner up to compatriot Doris Lemngole at the NCAA Cross Country Championship in Verona, Wisconsin.

=== 2025 ===
Kosgei ran 31:17.82 to set a new 10,000 metres personal best and meeting record at the 2025 NCAA Outdoor Championships in Eugene, Oregon in June 2025, breaking the record time set the year previously by Parker Valby.

She was named in the Kenyan team for the 2025 World Athletics Championships but did not qualify for the final of the 3000 metres steeplechase.

In October 2025, she won the cross country title for New Mexico at the Mountain West Conference Championships. She had a second-place finish at the NCAA Division I Mountain Cross Country Regional championships in Salt Lake City, finishing runner-up to Jane Hedengren, but winning the team title with New Mexico. That year, Kosgei was a finalist for the 2025 Bowerman Award as the year's best student-athlete in American collegiate track and field.

=== 2026 ===
Kosgei placed third in 15:07.76 in the 5000m behind Jane Hedengren and Doris Lemngole on 13 March at the 2026 NCAA Indoor Championships. The next day, she made the podium again as she finished runner-up to Hedengren in the 3000 metres, running a personal best 8:43.86. Kosgei ran a personal best 30:49.99 for the 10,000 metres placing second to Hedengren at the Stanford Invitational in April. On 11 June, she placed second to Mercyline Kirwa in the 10,000 m at the 2026 NCAA Outdoor Championships in 31:56.49. On the road circuit in August, Kosgei won the Beach to Beacon 10K and Falmouth Road Race.

Competing in cross country, Kosgei placed thirteenth at the Nuttycombe Invitational after losing a shoe, before winning the Mountain West Conference race by 29.9 seconds.

== Personal life ==
She is from Elgeyo-Marakwet County, Kenya. Kosgei is the sister of Olympic silver medalist and world record holder Brigid Kosgei. She has described her sister as her inspiration.
