= 2023 World Athletics Cross Country Championships – U20 women's race =

U20 women's race at the 2023 World Athletics Cross Country Championships
- Organisers: World Athletics
- Edition: 44th
- Date: February 18, 2023
- Host city: Bathurst, New South Wales, Australia
- Events: 1
- Distances: 6 km – U20 women
- Participation: 61 athletes from 15 nations

The U20 women's race at the 2023 World Athletics Cross Country Championships was held at the Bathurst in Australia, on February 18, 2023. Senayet Getachew from Ethiopia won the gold medal by 7 seconds over Ethiopian Medina Eisa (who was later given a two-year ban for age falsification violations and stripped of her silver medal), while Pamela Kosgei finished second and Faith Cherotich finished third.

== Race results ==
=== U20 women's race (6 km) ===
==== Individual ====
| Rank | Athlete | Country | Time |
|---|---|---|---|
| 1st place, gold medalist(s) | Senayet Getachew | Ethiopia | 20:53 |
| 2nd place, silver medalist(s) | Pamela Kosgei | Kenya | 21:01 |
| 3rd place, bronze medalist(s) | Faith Cherotich | Kenya | 21:10 |
| 4 | Lemlem Nibret | Ethiopia | 21:16 |
| 5 | Joyline Chepkemoi | Kenya | 21:17 |
| 6 | Meseret Yeshaneh | Ethiopia | 21:27 |
| 7 | Tinebeb Asres | Ethiopia | 21:32 |
| 8 | Diana Chepkemoi | Kenya | 21:46 |
| 9 | Ellie Shea | United States | 21:48 |
| 10 | Irene Riggs | United States | 22:03 |
| 11 | Karrie Baloga | United States | 22:12 |
| 12 | Bentalin Yeko | Uganda | 22:24 |
| 13 | Charity Cherop | Uganda | 22:36 |
| 14 | Felister Chekwemoi | Uganda | 22:36 |
| 15 | Kana Mizogami | Japan | 22:37 |
| 16 | Aya Kotajima | Japan | 22:46 |
| 17 | Zariel Macchia | United States | 23:05 |
| 18 | Miku Muraoka | Japan | 23:07 |
| 19 | Mariya Noda | Japan | 23:11 |
| 20 | Xela Martínez | Spain | 23:11 |
| 21 | Rebecca Flaherty | United Kingdom | 23:11 |
| 22 | Hannah Ryding | United Kingdom | 23:18 |
| 23 | Yuya Sawada | Japan | 23:20 |
| 24 | María Viciosa | Spain | 23:22 |
| 25 | Catherine Lund | New Zealand | 23:24 |
| 26 | Nanaka Yonezawa | Japan | 23:29 |
| 27 | Eva Klingbeil | United States | 23:29 |
| 28 | Peace Chebet | Uganda | 23:46 |
| 29 | Mariam Benkert | Spain | 23:51 |
| 30 | Li-mari Dekker | South Africa | 23:51 |
| 31 | Zoe Gilbody | United Kingdom | 23:51 |
| 32 | Allie Zealand | United States | 24:00 |
| 33 | Aspen Anderson | Australia | 24:03 |
| 34 | Bella Earl | New Zealand | 24:11 |
| 35 | Risper Cherop | Uganda | 24:14 |
| 36 | Marika Couture | Canada | 24:15 |
| 37 | Charli-Rose Carlyon | Australia | 24:28 |
| 38 | Megan Harris | United Kingdom | 24:32 |
| 39 | Boh Ritchie | New Zealand | 24:38 |
| 40 | Gabrielle Schmidt | Australia | 24:54 |
| 41 | Jimena Blanco | Spain | 24:57 |
| 42 | Muriel Lovshin | Canada | 25:05 |
| 43 | Wiepke Schoeman | South Africa | 25:14 |
| 44 | Emily Cescon | Canada | 25:19 |
| 45 | Phemelo Matshaba | South Africa | 25:54 |
| 46 | Laura Rojas | Colombia | 26:56 |
| 47 | Omaatla Dikao | South Africa | 26:58 |
| 48 | Shahd Mohamed Abdo | Egypt | 27:05 |
| 49 | Maya Postrzygacz | Cook Islands | 31:11 |
| | Amy Bunnage | Australia | DNF |
| | Claudia Meaker | Australia | DNF |
| | Gabrielle Vincent | Australia | DNF |
| | Ella Ballard | Canada | DNF |
| | Erin Vringer | Canada | DNF |
| | Mackenzie Morgan | New Zealand | DNF |
| | Naledi Makgatha | South Africa | DNF |
| | Akeneta Lutu | Fiji | DNF |
| | Michelle Gray | Canada | DNS |
| | Sherifa Moro | Ghana | DNS |
| DSQ | Medina Eisa | Ethiopia | ~~21:00~~ DQ |
| DSQ | Melknat Wudu | Ethiopia | ~~21:57~~ DQ |

==== Team ====
| Rank | Team | Score |
|---|---|---|
| 1st place, gold medalist(s) | Ethiopia | 18 |
| 2nd place, silver medalist(s) | Kenya | 18 |
| 3rd place, bronze medalist(s) | United States | 47 |
| 4 | Uganda | 67 |
| 5 | Japan | 68 |
| 6 | United Kingdom | 112 |
| 7 | Spain | 114 |
| 8 | South Africa | 165 |
