= Caren Chebet =

Kenyan athlete (born 2000)

Personal information
- Born: 24 May 2000 (age 26)

Sport
- Sport: Athletics
- Events: 3000 m steeplechase, Cross Country running

Achievements and titles
- Personal bests: 3000m Steeplechase: 9:22.35 (Hengelo, 2025)
Medal record
Women's athletics
Representing Kenya
African Championships
Bronze medal – third place	2022 Saint Pierre	3000 m st.
African U20 Championships
Silver medal – second place	2019 Abidjan	3000 m st.
World U18 Championships
Gold medal – first place	2017 Nairobi	2000 m st.
World Cross Country Championships
Silver medal – second place	2026 Tallahassee	Senior team

Caren Chebet (born 24 May 2000) is a Kenyan cross country runner and steeplechaser. She was the gold medalist at the 2017 World Youth Championships in Athletics in the 2000 metres steeplechase, and a bronze medalist at the 2022 African Championships in the 3000 metres steeplechase.

== Career ==
In May 2017, Chebet was runner-up to Mercy Chepkurui in the 2000 m steeplechase at the Kenyan U18 Trials. Chebet subsequently won the gold medal ahead of Chepkurui in the 2000 metres steeplechase at the 2017 IAAF World U18 Championships in Nairobi.

Chebet was the silver medalist in the 3000 metres steeplechase at the 2019 African Athletics U20 Championships in Abidjan, Ivory Coast, finishing behind championship record setting compatriot Fancy Cherono.

Chebet won the bronze medal in the 3000 metres steeplechase at the 2022 African Athletics Championships in Mauritius.

In 2024, Chebet finished in sixth place in the senior women's race at the African Cross Country Championships in Tunisia. Later that year, she won the 3000 metres steeplechase in 9:43.05 at the Kenyan national trials, finishing ahead of Purity Kirui. Chebet placed seventh overall in the 3000 metres steeplechase at the 2024 African Games in Accra, Ghana.

Having competed in the Diamond League at the 2025 Meeting de Paris, Chebet placed third in the 3000 metres steeplechase at the Kenyan World Championships Trials behind Faith Cherotich and Doris Lemngole.

In October 2025, Chebet secured a win at the 2025 Athletics Kenya Cross Country series in Kericho. In December 2025, she was confirmed in the Kenyan team for the 2026 World Athletics Cross Country Championships in Tallahassee, placing eleventh overall as Kenya won the team silver medal.
