= 2017 World Youth Championships in Athletics – Girls' 2000 metres steeplechase =

Event at athletics championship

Girls' 2000 metres steeplechase at the World U18 Championships
- Venue: Moi International Sports Centre
- Dates: 14 July 2017
- Winning time: 6:24.80

Medalists
gold medal	Caren Chebet	Kenya
silver medal	Mercy Chepkurui	Kenya
bronze medal	Ethlemahu Sintayehu	Ethiopia

The Girls' 2000 metres steeplechase at the 2017 World Youth Championships in Athletics was held on 14 July.

Mercy Chepkirui, the world leader, held a large lead on the final lap, but she fell on the last water jump which gave her compatriot Caren Chebet a chance to pass and win the gold medal.

== Records ==
Prior to the competition, the event records were as follows.

World Youth Best	Korahubish Itaa (ETH)	6:11.83	Bressanone, Italy	10 July 2009
Championship Record	Korahubish Itaa (ETH)	6:11.83	Bressanone, Italy	10 July 2009
World Youth Leading	Mercy Chepkirui (KEN)	6:27.6h	Eldoret, Kenya	26 May 2017

== Final ==
Women's 2000mSC
Place	Athlete	Country	Time
1st place, gold medalist(s)	Caren Chebet	Kenya	6:24.80
2nd place, silver medalist(s)	Mercy Chepkurui	Kenya	6:26.10
3rd place, bronze medalist(s)	Ethlemahu Sintayehu	Ethiopia	6:35.79
4	Anna Mark Helwigh	Denmark	6:47.69
5	Klaudia Pawlus	Poland	6:47.87
6	Shanley Koekemoer	South Africa	6:54.27
7	Karin Gošek	Slovenia	7:00.43
8	Josina Papenfuß	Germany	7:00.45
9	Yonca Kutluk	Turkey	7:02.20
10	Daniela Vasile	Romania	7:06.54
11	Emilie Renaud	France	7:08.08
12	Wiktoria Klębowska	Poland	7:13.34
13	Georgiana Cosmina Spiridon	Romania	7:28.76
14	Bimashi A. H. Herath Mudiyansela	Sri Lanka	8:09.23
	Veronica Hilario	Peru	DQ
	Houda Ahettiou	Morocco	DQ
	Meswat Asmare	Ethiopia	DQ
