= Krissy Gear =

American middle-distance runner

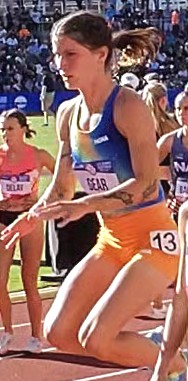
- Gear at the 2024 United States Olympic trials

Personal information
- Born: Kristlin Gear; July 20, 1999 (age 26) Fort Myers, Florida, U.S.
- Home town: Fort Myers, Florida
- Employer: Hoka One One
- Height: 5 ft 4 in (163 cm)

Sport
- Country: United States
- Sport: Athletics/Track
- Event(s): Steeplechase, 3000 meters, 1500 meters
- College team: Arkansas University '20 - '22; Furman University '17-'19
- Coached by: Robert Gary '17 - 19; Lance Harter '20 - 22; Alan Culpepper '22-23; Jenna Wrieden & Jack Mullaney '22 - '24; Hayden Cox '24-present

Achievements and titles
- World finals: 2018 Tampere; 3000 m s'chase,
- Personal best(s): 800m: 2:00.67 (Fayetteville, 2025); 1500m: 4:03.65 (Los Angeles, 2024); Mile: 4:26.00 (Fayetteville, 2025); 3000m steeplechase: 9:12.81 (Eugene, 2023)

Krissy Gear (born July 20, 1999) is an American professional middle distance and World Championship steeplechase runner from Fort Myers, Florida. Gear placed 10th at 2018 World U20 Championships. She is the 2023 USA Champion and 2018 USA U20 Champion. Kristlin Gear is an American track and field athlete. In 2023, she became the US national champion in the 3000m steeplechase.

== Career ==
Initially a middle-distance runner, she set a Furman University school record in the 800m with a time of 2:08s. She later switched to the 3000m steeplechase as well as running 1500m. She was named the Southern Conference Indoor Freshman of the Year in 2018. Gear was selected to represent the US at the 2018 IAAF World U20 Championships in Tampere, Finland and finished tenth in the steeplechase. She later earned all-American honours at cross-country, and on the track, indoors and outdoors and at 1500m and in the steeplechase.

Competing at the 2023 USA Outdoor Track and Field Championships, in Eugene, Oregon, she finished first in the final of the 3000m steeplechase. Gear upset ten-time national champion Emma Coburn in the race, which Gear ran in a new personal best time of 9:12.81, and included a 66.66 second final lap. The time was under the World Championship qualifying standard, and winning the race guaranteed Gear for automatic selection for the 2023 World Athletics Championships held in Budapest in August 2023. Competing in the 3000m steeplechase at the 2023 World Athletics Championships in Budapest, she qualified finished seventh in her heat, running 9:30.61.

=== International competitions ===
Representing the United States
Year	Competition	Venue	Position	Event	Time	Notes
2018	World U20 Championships	Tampere, Finland	10th	3000 m s'chase	10:00.99	
2023	World Championships	Budapest, Hungary	22nd	3000 m s'chase	9:30.61	
2025	NACAC Championships	Freeport, Bahamas	1st	3000 m s'chase	9:35.27	

=== National championships ===
Year	Competition	Venue	Position	Event	Notes
2017	New Balance Nationals Outdoor	North Carolina A&T State University	3rd	Mile	4:49.36
2018	USATF U20 Outdoor Championships	Indiana University Bloomington	1st	3000 m s'chase	10:28.05
2021	US Olympic Trials	Eugene, Oregon	27th	1500 m	4:19.81
2021	US Olympic Trials	Eugene, Oregon	16th	3000 m s'chase	9:47.59
2022	USATF Championships	Eugene, Oregon	26th	1500 m	4:20.04
2023	USATF Indoor Championships	Albuquerque, New Mexico	3rd	1500 m	4:18.21
2023	USATF Championships	Eugene, Oregon	1st	3000 m s'chase	9:12.81
2025	USATF 1 Mile Road Championships	Des Moines, Iowa	1st	One mile	4:24

== NCAA ==
Gear is a 2022 NCAA champion, 8-time NCAA Division I All-American, 4-time Southern Conference champion, & 3-time Southeastern Conference champion.

Year	Competition	Venue	Position	Event	Time
Representing Arkansas Razorbacks
2022	2022 NCAA Outdoor Track and Field Championships	Eugene, Oregon	4th	1500 m	4:10.06
2022	SEC Outdoor Track and Field Championships	University of Mississippi	11th	1500 m	4:28.05
2022	SEC Outdoor Track and Field Championships	University of Mississippi	4th	3000 m s'chase	10:03.34
2022	2022 NCAA Indoor Track and Field Championships	University of Alabama, Birmingham; Birmingham Metro CrossPlex	1st	DMR	10:51.37
2022	SEC Indoor Track and Field Championships	University of Arkansas	3rd	Mile	4:35.72
2022	SEC Indoor Track and Field Championships	University of Arkansas	2nd	DMR	10:57.26
2021	NCAA Cross Country Championships	Apalachee Regional Park Tallahassee, Florida	43rd	6000 m Cross Country	19:59.1
2021	SEC Cross Country Championships	Columbia, Missouri; University of Missouri	3rd	6000 m Cross Country	20:08.1
2021	2021 NCAA Outdoor Track and Field Championships	Eugene, Oregon	5th	1500 m	4:11.01
2021	SEC Outdoor Track and Field Championships	Texas A&M University	7th	5000 m	16:05.71
2021	SEC Outdoor Track and Field Championships	Texas A&M University	1st	3000 m s'chase	9:38.62
2021	NCAA Cross Country Championships	Oklahoma State Cross Country Course; Stillwater, Oklahoma	21st	6000 m Cross Country	20:39.3
2021	2021 NCAA Indoor Track and Field Championships	University of Arkansas	2nd	Mile	4:32.72
2021	2021 NCAA Indoor Track and Field Championships	University of Arkansas	2nd	DMR	10:57.19
2021	SEC Indoor Track and Field Championships	University of Arkansas	1st	Mile	4:34.72
2021	SEC Indoor Track and Field Championships	University of Arkansas	13th	3000 m	9:38.57
2020	SEC Cross Country Championships	Louisiana State University	11th	6000 m Cross Country	20:28.8
2020	SEC Indoor Track and Field Championships	Texas A&M University Gilliam Indoor Track Stadium; College Station, Texas	1st	DMR	11:19.51
2020	SEC Indoor Track and Field Championships	Texas A&M University Gilliam Indoor Track Stadium; College Station, Texas	2nd	Mile	4:42.15
2020	SEC Indoor Track and Field Championships	Texas A&M University Gilliam Indoor Track Stadium; College Station, Texas	20th	3000 m	9:43.16
Representing Furman University
2019	NCAA Cross Country Championships	LaVern Gibson Championship Cross Country Course; Terre Haute, Indiana	78th	6000 m Cross Country	21:06.9
2019	Southern Cross Country Championships	East Tennessee State University	4th	5000 m Cross Country	17:55.9
2019	2019 NCAA Division I Outdoor Track and Field Championships	Mike A. Myers Stadium; University of Texas at Austin	15th	3000 m s'chase	10:15.07
2019	Southern Conference Outdoor Track and Field Championships	Samford University	1st	800 m	2:09.80
2019	Southern Conference Outdoor Track and Field Championships	Samford University	3rd	3000 m s'chase	10:31.22
2019	Southern Conference Outdoor Track and Field Championships	Samford University	5th	4 × 400 m	3:59.27
2019	Southern Conference Indoor Track and Field Championships	Virginia Military Institute	1st	DMR	11:39.35
2019	Southern Conference Indoor Track and Field Championships	Virginia Military Institute	5th	Mile	4:51.19
2019	Southern Conference Indoor Track and Field Championships	Virginia Military Institute	2nd	800 m	2:09.11
2019	Southern Conference Indoor Track and Field Championships	Virginia Military Institute	7th	4 × 400 m	4:06.46
2018	NCAA Cross Country Championships	Madison, Wisconsin	237th	6000 m Cross Country	22:29.9
2018	Southern Cross Country Championships	Western Carolina University	9th	5000 m Cross Country	18:15.3
2018	2018 NCAA Division I Outdoor Track and Field Championships	Eugene, Oregon	24th	3000 m s'chase	10:35.42
2018	Southern Conference Outdoor Track and Field Championships	Western Carolina University	9th	1500 m	4:41.64
2018	Southern Conference Outdoor Track and Field Championships	Western Carolina University	4th	3000 m s'chase	10:49.06
2018	Southern Conference Outdoor Track and Field Championships	Western Carolina University	6th	4 × 400 m	3:55.12
2018	Southern Conference Indoor Track and Field Championships	Virginia Military Institute	1st	Mile	4:52.34
2018	Southern Conference Indoor Track and Field Championships	Virginia Military Institute	1st	800 m	2:10.28
2018	Southern Conference Indoor Track and Field Championships	Virginia Military Institute	5th	4 × 400 m	3:55.49
2017	NCAA Cross Country Championships	E. P. "Tom" Sawyer State Park; Louisville, Kentucky	239th	6000 m Cross Country	22:18.3
2017	Southern Cross Country Championships	Spartanburg, South Carolina; University of South Carolina Upstate	13th	5000 m Cross Country	17:39.1

== Early life ==
From Fort Myers, Florida, Gear attended Fort Myers Senior High School and ran collegiately for Furman University and the Arkansas Razorbacks.

== Prep ==
Kristlin Gear attended Fort Myers Senior High School in Fort Myers, Florida, where she emerged as one of the top high school distance runners in Florida until she graduated in 2017. While competing in high school cross country and track, Gear is a 6-time Florida High School Athletic Association state 3A champion.

== Personal life ==
Kristlin Gear is the oldest of three children of Brian Gear. She has two younger sisters, Lilly and Gabby.
