= Kirui =

Kirui is a surname of Kalenjin origin that may refer to:

- Abel Kirui (born 1982), Kenyan marathon runner and two-time world champion
- Catherine Kirui (born 1976), Kenyan long-distance runner
- Dominic Kirui (born 1967), Kenyan cross country runner and 1993 World runner-up
- Eliud Kirui (born 1975), Kenyan cross country runner
- Geoffrey Kirui (born 1993), Kenyan long-distance runner
- Ismael Kirui (born 1975), Kenyan 5000 metres runner and two-time world champion
- Paul Kirui (born 1980), Kenyan road runner and 2004 World Half Marathon champion
- Peter Cheruiyot Kirui (born 1988), Kenyan marathon runner
- Silas Kirui (born 1981), Kenyan long-distance track runner competing for Bahrain as Hasan Mahboob
- Gilbert Kirui (born 1994), Kenyan steeplechase runner

== See also ==
- Kipkirui, Kenyan name meaning "son of Kirui"
