= Loice Chekwemoi =

Ugandan athlete (born 2006)

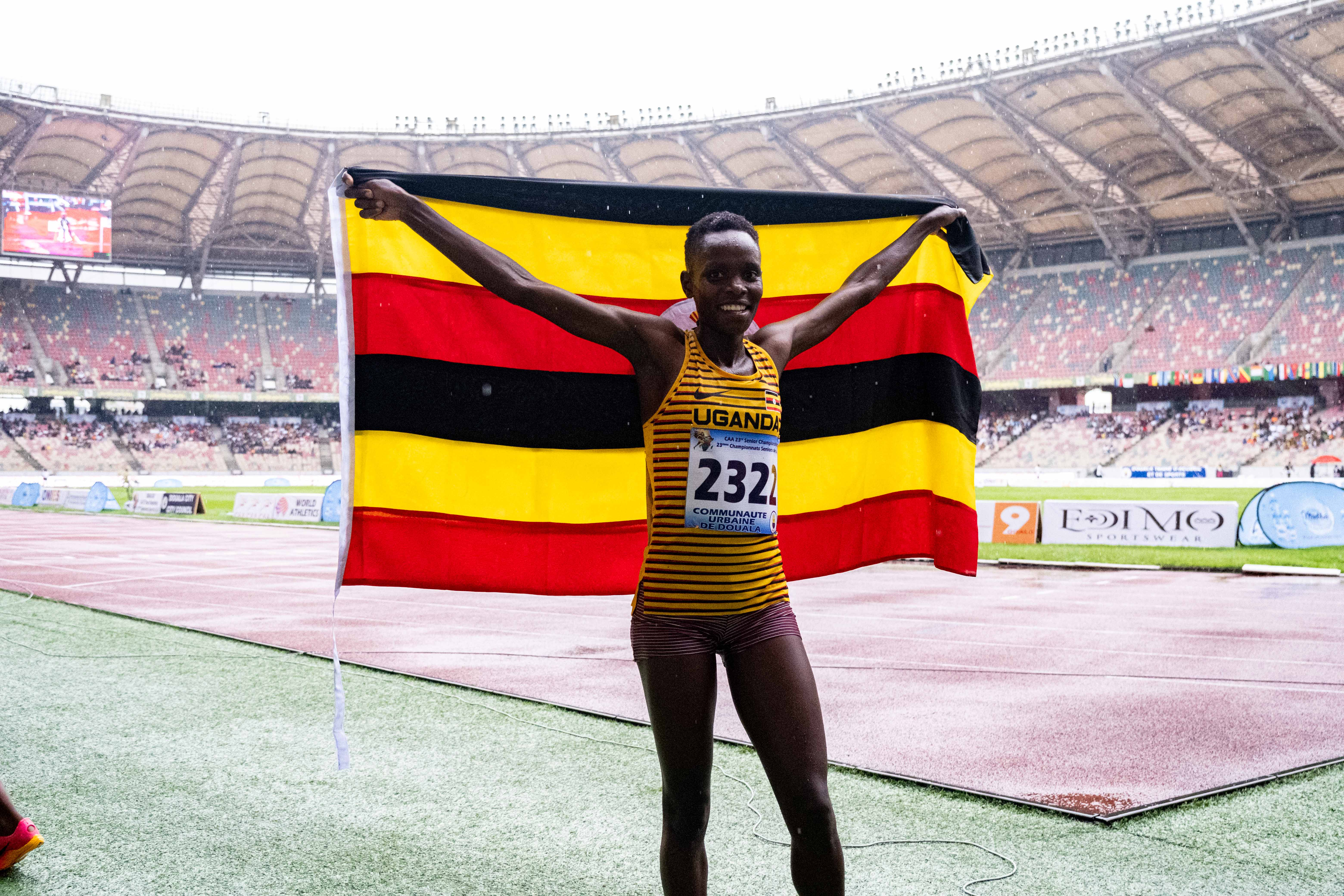
- Loice Chekwemoi

Personal information
- Nationality: Ugandan
- Born: 12 December 2006 (age 19)

Sport
- Sport: Athletics
- Event(s): Steeplechase, Cross Country running

Achievements and titles
- Personal best(s): 3000m s'chase: 9:18.84 (Lima, 2024)
Medal record
Women's Athletics
Representing Uganda
African Championships
Gold medal – first place	2024 Douala	3000 m s'chase
World U20 Championships
Silver medal – second place	2024 Lima	3000 m st.
World Cross Country Championships
Bronze medal – third place	2024 Belgrade	Senior team

Loice Chekwemoi (born 12 December 2006) is a Ugandan steeplechaser. In 2024, she became African champion in the 3000 metres steeplechase at the age of 17 years-old. That year, she was the silver medalist at the 2024 World U20 Championships.

== Biography ==
In January 2022, she was runner-up at the Ugandan national cross country championships in Tororo. She finished sixth in the women's 3000m steeplechase at the 2022 World Athletics U20 Championships in Cali, Colombia.

She won a bronze medal as part of the Ugandan team at the 2024 World Athletics Cross Country Championships, placing ninth individually in the senior women's race. In June 2024, she won gold at the 2024 African Championships in Athletics in the Women's 3000 metres steeplechase in Douala, Cameroon. She won the silver medal at the 2024 World Athletics U20 Championships in Lima, Peru. In December 2024, she won The Great Chepsaita Cross Country race in Kenya.

She competed at the 2025 World Athletics Championships and ran a season's best 9:25.34 but did not qualify for the final of the 3000 metres steeplechase.
