= Senayet Getachew =

Ethiopian track and field athlete

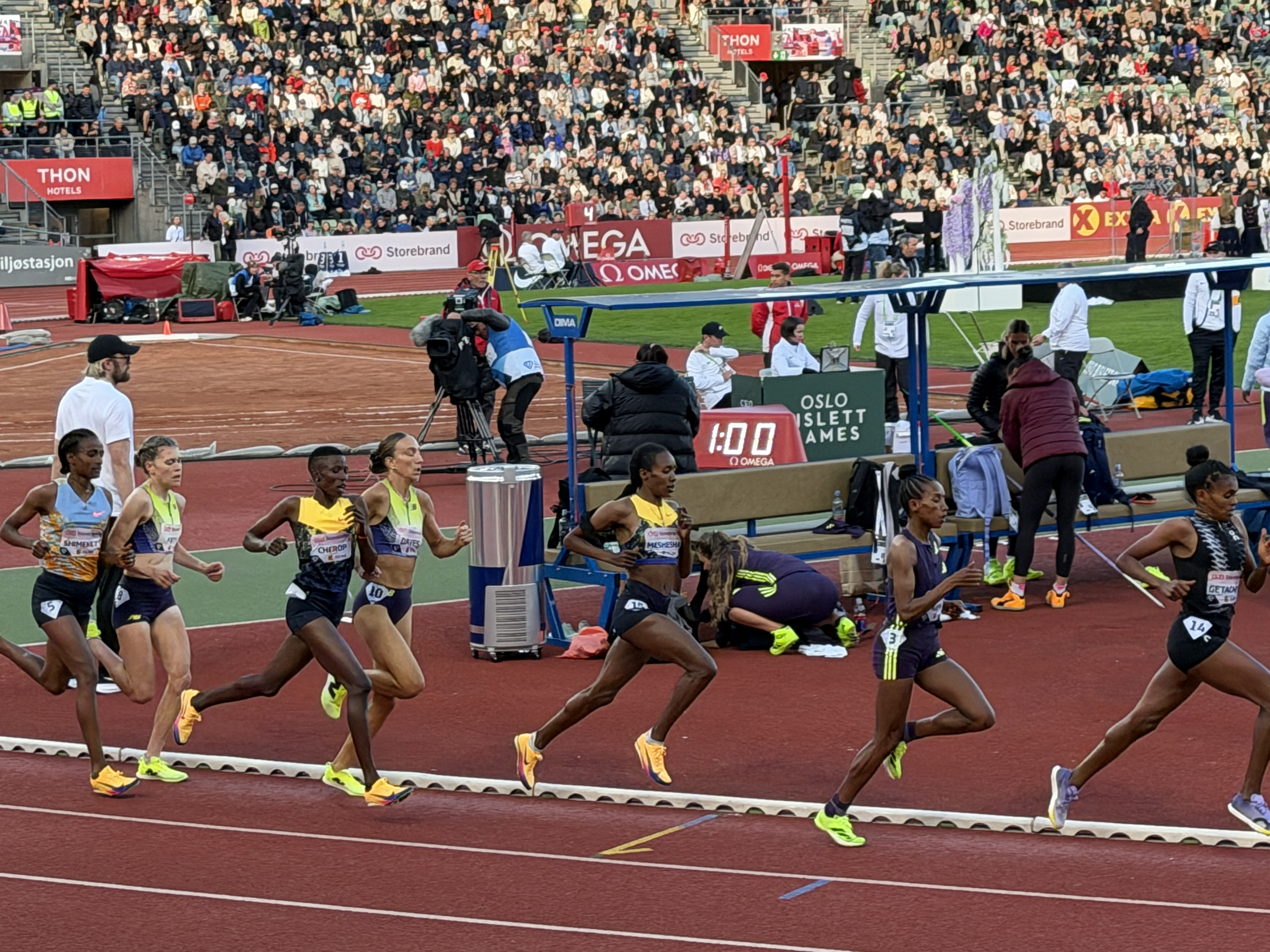
- Getachew at the 2026 Bislett Games

Personal information
- Nationality: Ethiopian
- Born: 1 October 2005 (age 21)

Sport
- Sport: Athletics
- Event: Long-distance running

Achievements and titles
- Personal bests: 3000m: 8:24.02 (Monaco, 2026); 5000m: 14:22.37 (Rome, 2026); 10,000m: 30:36.67 (Los Angeles, 2025); Half marathon: 1:04:57 (Valencia, 2026)
Medal record
Women's athletics
Representing Ethiopia
Diamond League
Third place	2026	5000 m
World Cross Country Championships
Gold medal – first place	2026 Tallahassee	Senior team
Gold medal – first place	2023 Bathurst	Junior team
Gold medal – first place	2023 Bathurst	Junior race
Bronze medal – third place	2026 Tallahassee	Senior race

Senayet Getachew (born 1 October 2005) is an Ethiopian track and field and cross-country runner. She won gold medals at the 2023 World Athletics Cross Country Championships in the U20 women's individual race and for Ethiopia in the junior team race. In January 2024, she set a new world U20 5000 metres indoor record.

== Biography ==
On 18 February 2023 Senayet won gold at the 2023 World Athletics Cross Country Championships in the U20 women's race, beating compatriot Medina Eisa by seven seconds, with Pamela Kosgei of Kenya finishing third.

On 23 July 2023, Senayet set a new personal best in the 5000m on the track whilst competing at the Diamond League event in London, running 14:46.25.

In January 2024 in Boston, Massachusetts, Senayet set a new indoors U20 World Record time for the 5000 metres of 14:42.94, which broke a 20-year-old record set by Tirunesh Dibaba. The following month she set a new 3000 metres personal best time of 8:32.49 in Boston.

In January 2025, she won the Houston half marathon in a time of 66:05. In July 2025, she won the women's 10,000 metres in a personal best time of 30:36.67 at the Sunset Tour Los Angeles finishing eleven seconds clear of second-place Asayech Ayichew.

In January 2026, she was selected for the senior Ethiopian team to race at the 2026 World Athletics Cross Country Championships in Tallahassee, placing third in the senior individual race but winning the gold medal with the Ethiopia team. In May, she was third behind Faith Kipyegon and Likina Amebaw in a personal best of 14:24.71 for the 5000 metres at the 2026 Shanghai Diamond League. On 4 June, she lowered her 5000 metres personal best again, running 14:22.37 in finishing fourth at the 2026 Golden Gala in Rome. She placed third over 3000 metres at the 2026 Bislett Games in Oslo, in a new personal best of 8:25.85. On 10 July, she ran a personal best 8:24.02 for 3000 metres at the 2026 Herculis Diamond League event in Monaco. At the 2026 Diamond League Final in Brussels on 4 September, she placed second in the 5000 metres, finishing part of an Ethiopian one-two-three behind Freweyni Hailu and Likina Amebaw. Later that month, she placed seventh over 5000 m at the inaugural World Ultimate Championship in Budapest. On 25 October, she placed fifth at the Valencia half marathon in a personal best of 1:04:57.
