= Meseret Yeshaneh =

Ethiopian steeplechase runner (born 2005)

Personal information
- Nationality: Ethiopian
- Born: 12 May 2005 (age 21)

Sport
- Country: Ethiopia
- Sport: Athletics
- Event: 3000 metres steeplechase

Achievements and titles
- Personal best(s): 3000 m st.: 9:33.34 (Nairobi, 2022)
Medal record
Women's athletics
Representing Ethiopia
World U20 Championships
| Bronze medal – third place | 2022 Cali | 3000 m st. |
World Cross Country Championships
| Gold medal – first place | 2023 Bathurst | Junior team |

Meseret Yeshaneh (born 12 May 2005) is an Ethiopian runner.

== Career ==
She was a bronze medalist at the 2022 World Athletics U20 Championships in Cali, Colombia, in the 3000 metres steeplechase.

She finished sixth in the individual U20 event and gold in the team U20 event at the 2023 World Athletics Cross Country Championships in Bathurst, Australia. She finished fourth at the Cardiff Cross Challenge, on the World Athletics Cross Country Tour, in November 2023.

She won 3000 metres at the Belgrade Indoor Meeting, on the World Athletics Indoor Tour, in a time of 8:56.32 in January 2025.

== Personal life ==
She is the sister of marathon runner Ababel Yeshaneh.
