= Kipkirui =

Kipkirui (or Kipkurui) is a name of Kenyan origin that may refer to:

- Ishmael Kipkurui (born 2005), Kenyan runner
- Kipkurui Misoi (born 1978), Kenyan steeplechase runner
- Moses Kipkirui (born 1985), Kenyan steeplechase runner competing for Qatar as Musa Amer Obaid
- Willy Cheruiyot Kipkirui (born 1974), Kenyan marathon runner and four-time Eindhoven Marathon winner

== See also ==
- Kirui, origin of name Kipkirui from Kip (meaning "son of") + Kirui
