= Lemlem Nibret =

Ethiopian track and field athlete

Personal information
- Nationality: Ethiopian
- Born: 1 January 2005 (age 21)

Sport
- Sport: Athletics
- Event: Long-distance running
Medal record
Women's athletics
Representing Ethiopia
World Cross Country Championships
Gold medal – first place	2023 Bathurst	Junior team
Gold medal – first place	2026 Tallahassee	Senior team

Lemlem Nibret (born 1 January 2005) is an Ethiopian long-distance runner.

== Biography ==
In 2021 and 2023, she won the Jan Meda Cross Country U20 race in Sululta. In February 2023, she finished fourth in the individual and won gold in the team event at the 2023 World Athletics Cross Country Championships – U20 women's race.

In September 2023, she made her Diamond League debut in the 3000 metres in Xiamen.

In October 2023, she finished second at the Cross Internacional Zornotza. She finished eighth at the Cross Internacional de Atapuerca on the World Cross Country Tour Gold. She was subsequently selected for the 2024 World Athletics Cross Country Championships in Serbia, where she finished eighth with the Ethiopian team who retained their U20 team title.

On 20 April 2024, she finished third in the 5000 metres at the Kip Keino Classic in Nairobi in a time of 15:20.99.

In January 2026, she was selected for the senior Ethiopian team to race at the 2026 World Athletics Cross Country Championships in Tallahassee, placing 26th overall. In November, she placed fourth at the Cross Internacional de Soria in Spain.
