= Alemaddis Eyayu Sisay =

Ethiopian long-distance runner

Personal information
- Nationality: Ethiopian
- Born: 3 October 1999 (age 27)

Sport
- Sport: Athletics
- Events: Long-distance running (Half Marathon, 10K Road, 25K Road)

Alemaddis Eyayu Sisay (born 3 October 1999) is an Ethiopian long-distance runner specializing in half marathon and road races.

== Career ==
Alemaddis has shown strong performances in various road running events since her early career.

In 2019, she finished fifth at the Oelder Sparkassen-City-Lauf 10k in Germany, clocking 31:53. In 2021, she secured a second-place finish at the South African Half-Marathon Championships with a time of 1:08:04, which was a personal best at the time. In 2023, Alemaddis continued to compete strongly in half marathons, notably placing 11th at the competitive Ras Al Khaimah Half Marathon with a time of 1:08:49.

2024 was a significant year for Alemaddis with several notable results:

- She won the Hella Hamburg Halbmarathon in Germany with a time of 1:10:47.
- She achieved her current personal best in the half marathon at the Half-Marathon Buenos Aires, finishing second in 1:07:04.
- Alemaddis clinched a major victory at the Delhi Half Marathon, winning the women's elite race with a time of 1:08:17, beating pre-race favorites.
- She placed fourth at the Tata Steel World Kolkata 25k, recording 1:21:42.

In 2025, Alemaddis further improved her 10K road personal best, running 31:15 on 26 April.

== Personal bests ==
As of May 2025, Alemaddis's personal bests are:

- 10 Kilometres Road – 31:15 (26 April 2025)
- Half Marathon – 1:07:04 (Buenos Aires, 25 August 2024)
- 25 Kilometres Road – 1:21:42 (15 December 2024)
