= Fancy Cherono =

Kenyan athlete

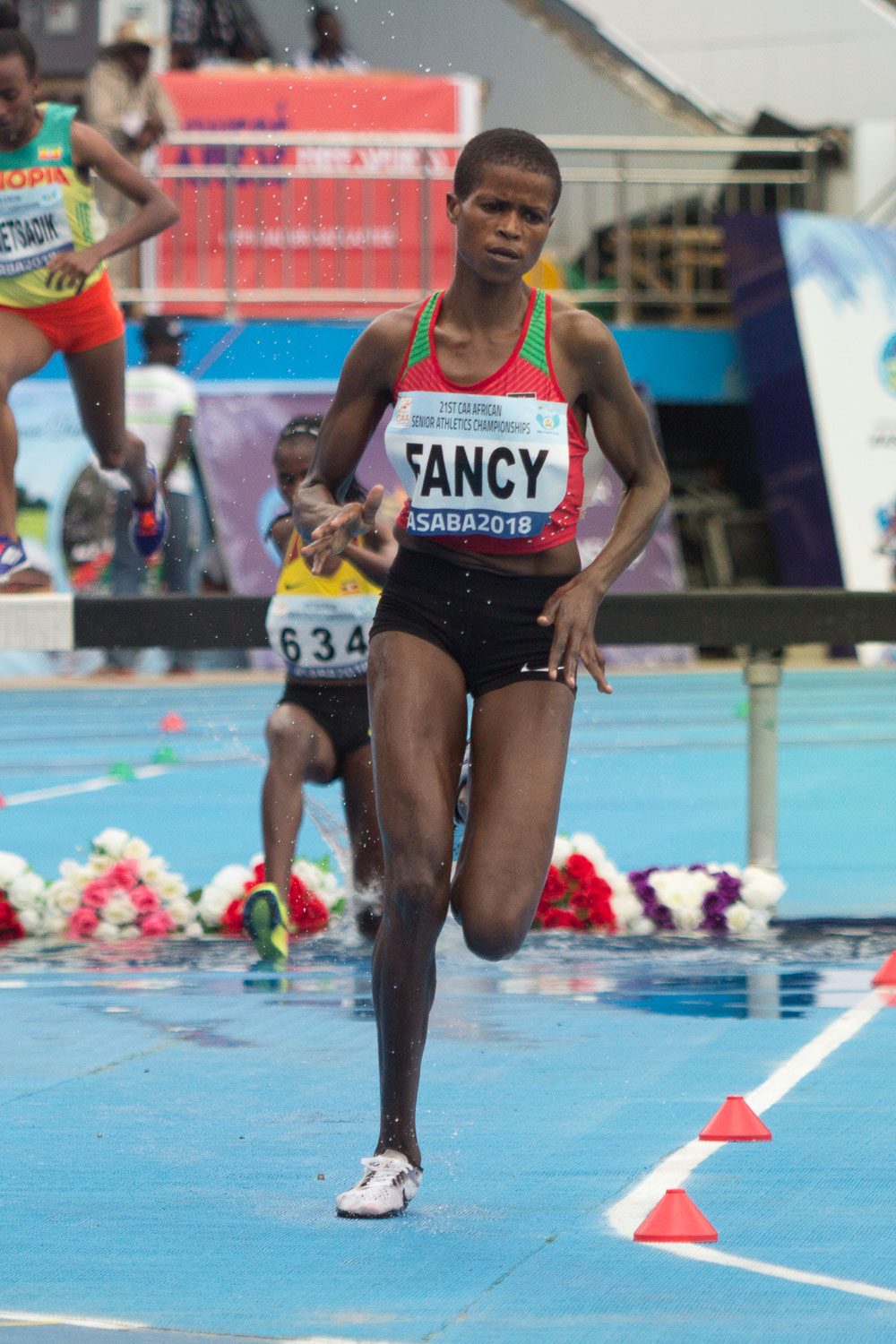
- Fancy Cherono in 2018

Personal information
- Nationality: Kenyan
- Born: 2 August 2001 (age 24)

Sport
- Sport: Athletics
- Event: Steeplechase
Medal record
Women's athletics
Representing Kenya
African Championships
| Bronze medal – third place | 2018 Asaba | 3000 m st. |

Fancy Cherono (born 2 August 2001) is a Kenyan athlete. She competed in the women's 3000 metres steeplechase event at the 2019 World Athletics Championships. A former Youth Olympic champion, She was the gold medalist in the 3000 metres steeplechase at the 2019 African Athletics U20 Championships in Abidjan, Ivory Coast, finishing with a championship record time of 9:48.56 ahead of compatriot Caren Chebet.
