= Peruth Chemutai =

Ugandan steeplechase runner

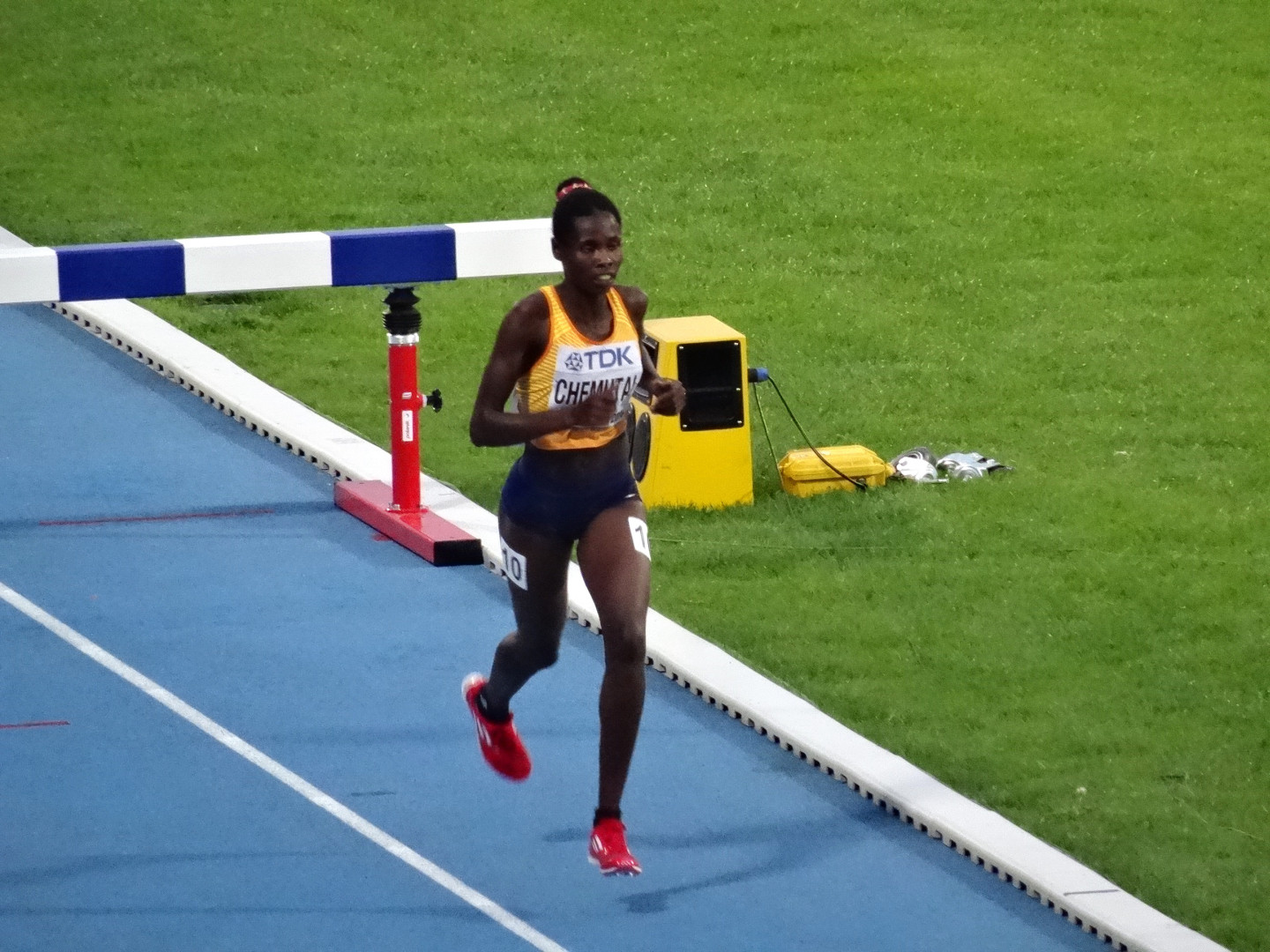
- Chemutai in 2016

Personal information
- Born: 10 July 1999 (age 27) Bukwo District, Uganda

Sport
- Country: Uganda
- Sport: Athletics
- Event: Long-distance running

Achievements and titles
- Personal bests: 3000 m SC: 8:48.03 NR (Rome 2024); Road; 5 km: 15:05 (Lille 2022); 10 km: 29:57 NR (Berlin 2026)
Medal record
Women's athletics
Representing Uganda
Olympic Games
Gold medal – first place	2020 Tokyo	3000 m s'chase
Silver medal – second place	2024 Paris	3000 m s'chase
Commonwealth Games
Bronze medal – third place	2022 Birmingham	3000 m s'chase
Bronze medal – third place	2026 Glasgow	3000m steeplechase
African Games
Silver medal – second place	2023 Accra	3000 m s'chase
World U20 Championships
Silver medal – second place	2018 Tampere	3000 m s'chase

Peruth Chemutai (born July 10, 1999) is a Ugandan steeplechase runner. She won the gold medal in the women's 3000 metres steeplechase at the 2020 Summer Olympics in Tokyo, becoming the first Ugandan woman ever to win an Olympic medal. She added a silver medal in this event at the 2024 Summer Olympics.

Chemutai is the Ugandan record holder for the 3000 m steeplechase and 5 kilometres road race.

== Career ==
Hailing from the Bukwo District, she took up running in 2013 after attending the District Athletics Championships in Bukwo as a casual fan. At the 2015 Commonwealth Youth Games in Apia, she won silver medals in the 1500 metres and 3000 metres.

In 2016, the 17-year-old finished in seventh place in the final of the women's 3000 m steeplechase event at the 2016 IAAF World U20 Championships held in Bydgoszcz, Poland.

At the 2016 Summer Olympics in Rio de Janeiro, her time of 9:31.03 in the heats did not qualify her for the final.

She also competed in the junior women's race at the 2017 IAAF World Cross Country Championships in Kampala, finishing in seventh place.

At the 2018 World U20 Championships held in mid-July, she claimed a notable silver medal in the 3000 m steeplechase. A week later, at the Monaco Diamond League, she set a national record with a time of 9:07.94.

In 2019, she competed in the senior women's race at the 2019 IAAF World Cross Country Championships held in Aarhus, Denmark. She finished in 5th place.

At the 2020 Tokyo Olympics, Chemutai competed in the 3000 m steeplechase. She beat pre-race favorites such as Beatrice Chepkoech and Hyvin Kiyeng Jepkemoi to finish with a time of 9:01.45, a national record, and win the gold medal. Chemutai became the first Ugandan woman ever to win an Olympic medal in any sport.

In 2024, Peruth won the 3000m steeplechase race at the Prefontaine Classic in Eugene in a time of 8:55.09, beating her own national record and running under the 9-minute barrier for the first time, her time moved her up to 6th on the all-time top lists. Peruth won the silver medal in the 3000m steeplechase at the 2024 Summer Olympics, finishing behind Winfred Yavi in a new Ugandan national record of 8:53.34.

== International competitions ==
Representing Uganda
Year	Competition	Venue	Position	Event	Notes
2015	Commonwealth Youth Games	Apia, Samoa	2nd	1500 m	4:18.22
2015	Commonwealth Youth Games	Apia, Samoa	2nd	3000 m	9:20.20
2016	World U20 Championships	Bydgoszcz, Poland	7th	3000 m s'chase	9:49.29
2016	Olympic Games	Rio de Janeiro, Brazil	17th (h)	3000 m s'chase	9:31.03 PB
2017	World Cross Country Championships	Kampala, Uganda	7th	XC 5.858 km U20	19:29
2017	World Championships	London, United Kingdom	20th (h)	3000 m s'chase	9:43.04
2018	World U20 Championships	Tampere, Finland	2nd	3000 m s'chase	9:18.87
2018	African Championships	Asaba, Nigeria	5th	3000 m s'chase	9:45.42
2019	World Cross Country Championships	Aarhus, Denmark	5th	XC 10.24 km	36:49
2019	World Championships	Doha, Qatar	5th	3000 m s'chase	9:11.08
2021	Olympic Games	Tokyo, Japan	1st	3000 m s'chase	9:01.45 NR
2022	World Championships	Eugene, United States	11th	3000 m s'chase	9:21.93
2022	Commonwealth Games	Birmingham, United Kingdom	3rd	3000 m s'chase	9:23.24
2023	World Championships	Budapest, Hungary	7th	3000 m s'chase	9:10.26
2024	African Games	Accra, Ghana	2nd	3000 m s'chase	9:16.07
2024	Olympic Games	Paris, France	2nd	3000 m s'chase	8:53.34 NR
2026	Commonwealth Games	Glasgow, United Kingdom	3rd	3000 m s'chase	9:09.96

== See also ==
- Judith Ayaa
- Halimah Nakaayi
- Vitus Ashaba
