= Celliphine Chespol =

Kenyan athlete

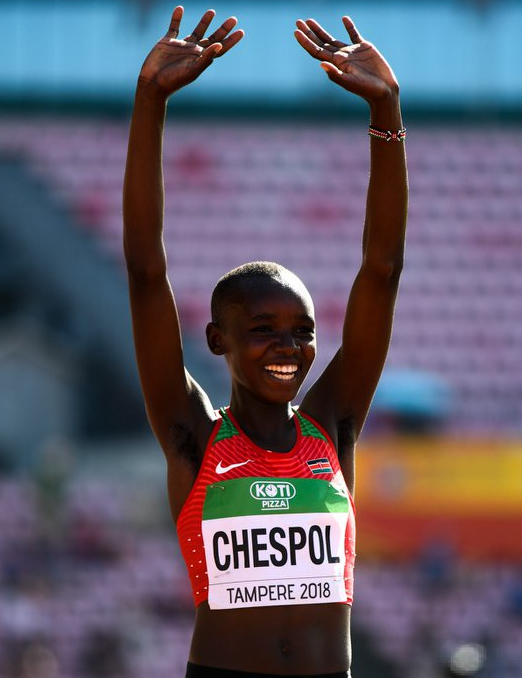
- Chespol at the 2018 IAAF World U20 Championships

Personal information
- Born: 23 March 1999 (age 27)

Sport
- Country: Kenya
- Sport: Athletics
- Event: 3000m steeplechase
Medal record
Women's athletics
Representing Kenya
African Championships
Silver medal – second place	2018 Asaba	3000 m st.
World U20 Championships
Gold medal – first place	2018 Tampere	3000 m st.

Celliphine Chepteek Chespol (born 23 March 1999) is a Kenyan track and field athlete, specialising in steeplechase running. In winning the 3000 metres steeplechase at 2017 Prefontaine Classic, her time of 8:58.78 was the second fastest of all time. Since she was 18 years 64 days old, it was also the world junior record. The race is more impressive since she lost her shoe at the water jump with more than a lap to go during the race. Later in the year, she represented Kenya at the 2017 World Championships, running with the breakaway lead pack until the last two laps, ultimately finishing in sixth place just behind the world record holder Ruth Jebet.

Previously she was the 2015 world youth champion and the 2016 world junior champion. IAAF has reported two different birthdates for her, 23 March 1999 in her athlete profile and 22 June 1998 in her Diamond League profile. If the 1999 birthdate is accurate, her 9:25.15 at the 2016 race would be a world youth best. Earlier in 2017, she finished third in the 2017 World Cross Country Championships Junior race, leading Kenya to the team silver medal, one point behind Ethiopia.

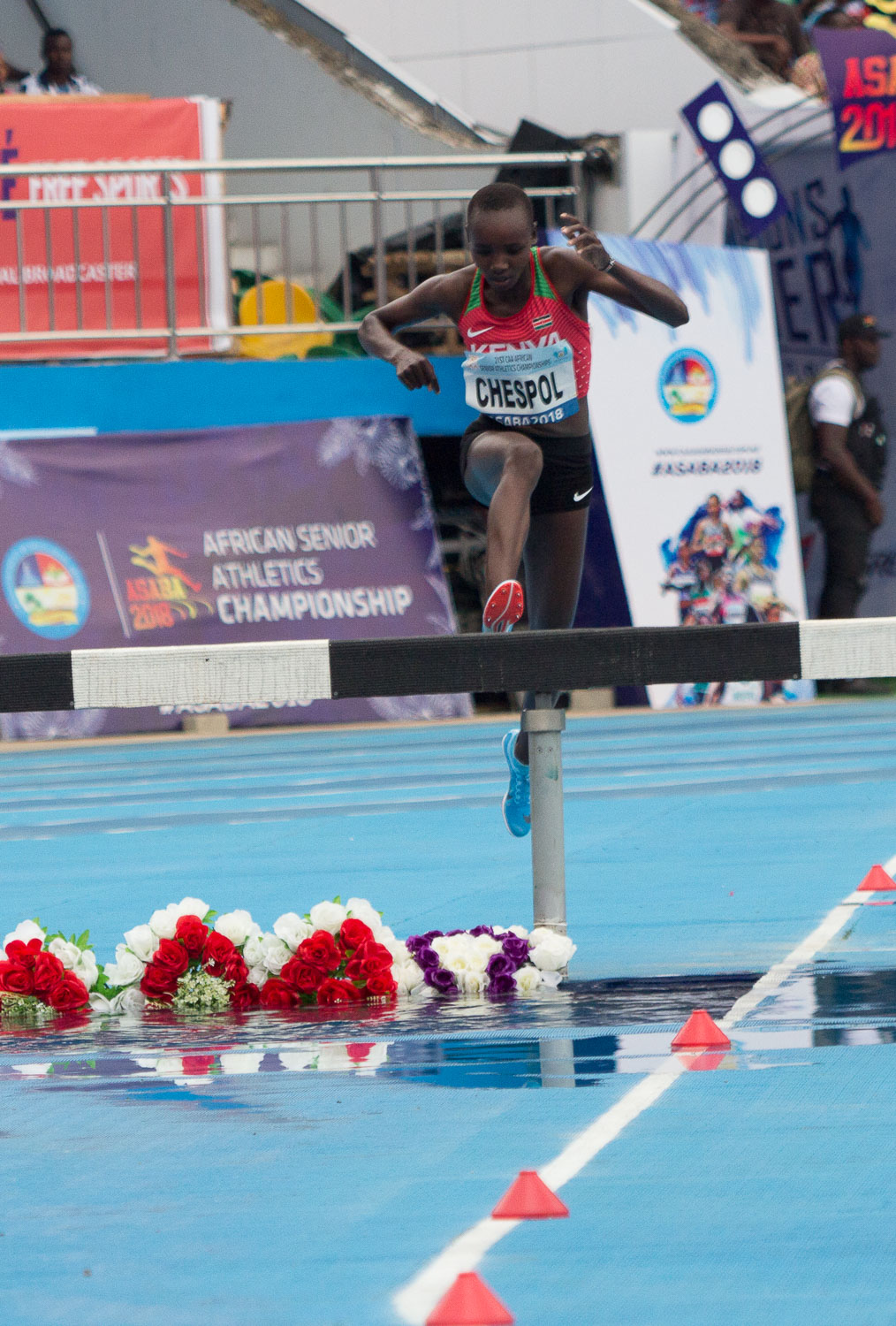
Celliphine Chespol of Kenya competing in the 2018 African Athletics Championship in Asaba, Nigeria
