= Dida =

Dida may refer to:

== People ==
=== Entertainment ===
- DiDa Ritz, American drag queen

=== Medicine ===
- Dida Dederding (1889–1955), Danish doctor and academic

=== Sports ===
==== Football ====
- Dida (footballer, born 1934) (1934–2002), born Edvaldo Alves de Santa Rosa, Brazilian forward
- Dida (footballer, born 1973), born Nélson de Jesus Silva, Brazilian goalkeeper
- Dida (footballer, born 1979), born Eduardo Gabriel dos Santos Filho, Brazilian rightback
- Dida (footballer, born 1991), born Ana Lúcia Nascimento dos Santos, Brazilian goalkeeper
- Dida Armstrong (born 2004), American professional soccer player

==== Other sports ====
- Dida Diafat (born 1970), French kickboxer
- Andre Dida (born 1983), born Andre Shervniski Amado, Brazilian mixed martial artist
- Chaltu Dida (born 2006), Ethiopian long-distance runner
- Dera Dida (born 1996), Ethiopian long-distance runner
- Gemechu Dida (born 1999), Ethiopian long-distance runner
- Robe Dida (born 2006), Ethiopian long-distance runner

=== Politics ===
- Dida of Eynsham, a 7th-century Mercian King
- Bujar Dida (born 1961), Albanian chemistry and ambassador
- Mohammed Abduba Dida (born 1974), Kenyan teacher and politician

== Other uses ==
- Banda Didá, a Brazilian all-female percussion band
- Dida Forest, a protected forest in Burkina Faso
- Dida language, a Kru language, or two languages, spoken in Côte d'Ivoire
- DiDA, the Diploma in Digital Applications, a former ICT qualification in the United Kingdom
- Drug Industry Document Archive, the Drug Industry Document Archive at the University of California, San Francisco, Library
- "Dida", a song by Joan Baez from her 1974 album Gracias a la Vida
- Dida (moth), a genus of moths of the family Erebidae
