= List of African youth bests in athletics =

African youth bests in the sport of athletics are the all-time best marks set in competition by African athletes aged 17 or younger throughout the entire calendar year of the performance. Confederation of African Athletics (CAA) doesn't maintain an official list for such performances. All bests shown on this list are tracked by statisticians not officially sanctioned by the governing body.

== Outdoor ==
=== Boys ===
Event	Record	Athlete	Nationality	Date	Meet	Place	Age	Ref.
100m	10.20 (+1.5 m/s)	Tlotliso Leotlela	South Africa	7 September 2015	Commonwealth Youth Games	Apia, Samoa	17 years, 118 days	
100m	10.2 A h NWI	Retshidisitswe Mlenga	South Africa	4 March 2016		Germiston, South Africa	16 years, 6 days	
200 m	20.43 (−0.4 m/s)	Sinesipho Dambile	South Africa	15 March 2019	AGN Youth, Junior & Senior Championships	Pretoria, South Africa	17 years, 13 days	
200 m	20.32 NWI	Sinesipho Dambile	South Africa	15 March 2019		Pretoria, South Africa	17 years, 13 days	
400 m	45.15 A	Riaan Dempers	South Africa	6 May 1994		Secunda, South Africa	17 years, 63 days	
800 m	1:43.37	Mohammed Aman	Ethiopia	10 September 2011	Rieti Meeting	Rieti, Italy	17 years, 243 days	
1000 m	2:17.59	Japheth Kimutai	Kenya	23 August 1995		Copenhagen, Denmark	16 years, 246 days	
1500 m	3:33.72	Nicholas Kiptanui Kemboi	Kenya	18 August 2006	Weltklasse Zürich	Zürich, Switzerland	16 years, 243 days	
Mile	3:54.56	Isaac Kiprono Songok	Kenya	20 August 2001		Linz, Austria	17 years, 117 days	
Mile (road)	4:03.85	Tiisetso Malungane	South Africa	16 June 2026	Curro Street Mile	Pretoria, South Africa	16 years, 152 days	
2000 m	4:56.86	Isaac Kiprono Songok	Kenya	31 August 2001	ISTAF	Berlin, Germany	17 years, 128 days	
3000 m	7:32.37	Abreham Cherkos	Ethiopia	11 July 2006		Lausanne, Switzerland	16 years, 291 days	
Two miles	8:16.07	Abreham Cherkos	Ethiopia	28 May 2006		Eugene, United States	16 years, 247 days	
5000 m	12:54.19	Abreham Cherkos	Ethiopia	14 July 2006	Golden Gala	Rome, Italy	16 years, 294 days	
5 km (road)	13:04	Biniam Mehary	Ethiopia	9 December 2023	Annual Charity Run	Al Khobar, Saudi Arabia	16 years, 354 days	
10,000 m	27:02.81	Ibrahim Jeilan	Ethiopia	25 August 2006	Memorial Van Damme	Brussels, Belgium	17 years, 74 days	
10 km (road)	28:05	Abayneh Degu	Ethiopia	11 October 2015	Grand 10 Berlin	Berlin, Germany	16 years, 314 days	
20 km (road)	58:20	Phaustin Baha Sulle	Tanzania	17 October 1999	20 Kilomètres de Paris	Paris, France	17 years, 140 days	
Half marathon	1:00:38	Phaustin Baha Sulle	Tanzania	4 September 1999	Lille Half Marathon	Lille, France	17 years, 97 days	
Marathon								
110 m hurdles (91.4 cm)	12.91 (+1.5 m/s)	Phenyo Miyen	South Africa	28 June 2025	ACNW Open Meeting	Potchefstroom, South Africa	17 years, 42 days	
110 m hurdles (99/100 cm)								
110 m hurdles (106.7 cm)								
400 m hurdles (84.0 cm)	48.84	Sokwakhana Zazini	South Africa	17 March 2017	Gauteng North Championships	Pretoria, South Africa	16 years, 175 days	
400 m hurdles (91.4 cm)	48.89	Louis Jacob van Zyl	South Africa	19 July 2002		Kingston, Jamaica	16 years, 364 days	
2000 m steeplechase	5:21.36	Nabil Ouhaddi	Morocco	16 July 2006		Rabat, Morocco	16 years, 335 days	
3000 m steeplechase	8:12.28	Getnet Wale	Ethiopia	11 June 2017	Fanny Blankers-Koen Games	Hengelo, Netherlands	16 years, 330 days	
High jump	2.25 m	Jacques Freitag	South Africa	1 July 1999		Pretoria, South Africa	17 years, 20 days	
High jump	2.25 m	Breyton Poole	South Africa	4 November 2017	Western Province Athletics Open Meeting	Cape Town, South Africa	17 years, 226 days	
Pole vault	5.30 m	Kyle Rademeyer	South Africa	29 March 2019	South African U18 Championships	Paarl, South Africa	17 years, 59 days	
Long jump	8.06 m (+0.8 m/s)	Temoso Masikane	South Africa	30 April 2023	African U18 Championships	Ndola, Zambia	17 years, 4 days	
Triple jump	16.22 m (+2.0 m/s)	Ineh Emmeanuel Oritsemeyiwa	Nigeria	26 July 2018	African Youth Games	Algiers, Algeria	17 years, 131 days	
Shot put (5 kg)								
Shot put (5.44 kg)								
Shot put (6 kg)								
Shot put (7.26 kg)								
Discus throw (1.5 kg)	68.23 m	Yahya Sawaby	Egypt	9 November 2026	Youth Olympics	Dakar, Senegal	17 years, 186 days	
Discus throw (1.75 kg)								
Discus throw (2 kg)								
Hammer throw (5 kg)								
Hammer throw (6 kg)								
Hammer throw (7.26 kg)								
Javelin throw (700 g)								
Javelin throw (800 g)								
Octathlon								
Octathlon	100m (wind) / Long jump (wind) / Shot put / 400m / 110m H (wind) / High jump / Javelin / 1000m							
Decathlon								
Decathlon	100m (wind) / Long jump (wind) / Shot put / High jump / 400m / 110m H (wind) / Discus / Pole vault / Javelin / 1500m							
10,000 m walk (track)	40:55.96	Yohanis Algaw	Ethiopia	23 July 2016	World U20 Championships	Bydgoszcz, Poland	16 years, 344 days	
10 km walk (road)	43:34	Rayen Jallali	Algeria	24 January 2025	Batna Race Walk International Meeting	Batna, Algeria	16 years, 357 days	
20,000 m walk (track)								
20 km walk (road)								
50,000 m walk (track)								
50 km walk (road)								
4 × 100 m relay								
4 × 400 m relay								
Medley relay								

=== Girls ===
Event	Record	Athlete	Nationality	Date	Meet	Place	Age	Ref.
100 m	11.22 A (+0.2 m/s)	Viwe Jingqi	South Africa	31 March 2022	ASA U18 Championships	Potchefstroom, South Africa	17 years, 42 days	
200 m	23.24 (±0.0 m/s)	Favour Ofili	Nigeria	26 June 2019	African Games Trials	Abuja, Nigeria	16 years, 177 days	
400 m	50.99 A	Beatrice Masilingi	Namibia	3 October 2020	Kip Keino Classic	Nairobi, Kenya	17 years, 176 days	
800 m	1:59.74	Diribe Welteji	Ethiopia	12 July 2018	World U20 Championships	Tampere, Finland	16 years, 60 days	
1000 m	2:37.9 h	Zola Budd	South Africa	7 February 1983		Bloemfontein, South Africa	16 years, 257 days	
1500 m	3:59.21	Saron Berhe	Ethiopia	20 April 2024	Xiamen Diamond League	Xiamen, China	16 years, 242 days	
1500 m	3:54.93 (Note: Date of birth not established to the satisfaction of the AIU)	Birke Haylom	Ethiopia	16 July 2023	Kamila Skolimowska Memorial	Chorzów, Poland	17 years, 191 days	
Mile	4:23.78	Elsabet Amare	Ethiopia	13 June 2026	Meeting Nikaïa	Nice, France	17 years, 110 days	
Mile (road)	4:36.51	Agnes Jebet Ngetich	Kenya	8 December 2018	Honolulu Kalakaua Merrie Mile	Honolulu, United States	17 years, 319 days	
2000 m	5:46.5+	Sally Barsosio	Kenya	16 August 1995	Weltklasse Zürich	Zürich, Switzerland	17 years, 148 days	
3000 m	8:39.00	Zola Budd	South Africa	2 April 1983		Durban, South Africa	16 years, 311 days	
5000 m	14:34.46	Marta Alemayo	Ethiopia	19 July 2025	London Athletics Meet	London, United Kingdom	17 years, 102 days	
5 km (road)	14:44	Yenawa Nbret	Ethiopia	9 December 2023	Annual Charity Run	Khobar, Saudi Arabia	16 years, 205 days	
5 km (road)	14:44	Marta Alemayo	Ethiopia	14 December 2024	Al Sharqiyah International 5KM	Khobar, Saudi Arabia	16 years, 250 days	
10,000 m	31:15.38	Sally Barsosio	Kenya	21 August 1993	World Championships	Stuttgart, Germany	15 years, 153 days	
10 km (road)	30:38	Yenawa Nbret	Ethiopia	22 September 2024	tRUNsylvania International 10K	Brasov, Romania	17 years, 127 days	
Half marathon	1:08:25	Alem Nigussie	Ethiopia	20 October 2019	Delhi Half Marathon	New Delhi, India	17 years, 292 days	
Marathon								
100 m hurdles (76.2 cm)								
100 m hurdles (84 cm)								
300 m hurldes	43.18 A	Lenka du Toit	South Africa	8 February 2025	Curro Podium Grand Finale & Simbine Classic Shootout	Pretoria, South Africa	13 years, 346 days	
400 m hurdles	56.50	Kate Obilor	Nigeria	22 July 2001	Nigerian Championships	Lagos, Nigeria	16 years, 5 days	
2000 m steeplechase	6:11.83	Korahubish Itaa	Ethiopia	10 July 2009	World Youth Championships	Brixen, Italy	17 years, 132 days	
3000 m steeplechase	9:24.73	Celliphine Chepteek Chespol	Kenya	14 May 2016	Shanghai Golden Grand Prix	Shanghai, China	17 years, 52 days	
High jump	1.96 m A	Charmaine Weavers	South Africa	4 April 1981		Bloemfontein, South Africa	17 years, 36 days	
Pole vault								
Long jump	6.45 m	Ibifuro Tobin-West	Nigeria	29 June 2001	AAC Region II Meet	Lagos, Nigeria	15 years, 190 days	
Triple jump	13.38 m (+1.5 m/s)	Ibifuro Tobin-West	Nigeria	3 July 2002		Limoges, France	16 years, 194 days	
Shot put (3 kg)	18.18 m	Zonica Lindeque	South Africa	10 April 2021	ASA Age Group Championships	Paarl, South Africa	17 years, 47 days	
Discus throw								
Hammer throw (3 kg)	66.99 A	Tharina Van Der Walt	South Africa	13 May 2017		Pretoria, South Africa	17 years, 80 days	
Javelin throw (500 g)	57.65 m	Aseel Osama Abdel Hamid	Egypt	25 April 2025	Emir Cup	Abu Dhabi, United Arab Emirates	17 years, 8 days	
Heptathlon								
Heptathlon	100m H (wind) / High jump / Shot put / 200m (wind) / Long jump (wind) / Javelin / 800m							
5000 m walk (track)	22:48.25	Ayalnesh Dejene	Ethiopia	18 July 2015	World Youth Championships	Cali, Colombia	17 years, 179 days	
10,000 m walk (track)	49:42.48	Janise Nell	South Africa	10 April 2021	ASA Age Group Championships	Paarl, South Africa	17 years, 74 days	
10 km walk (road)								
20,000 m walk (track)								
10 km walk (road)								
4 × 100 m relay								
4 × 400 m relay								
Medley relay								

== Indoor ==
=== Boys ===
Event	Record	Athlete	Nationality	Date	Meet	Place	Age	Ref.
60 m	6.72	Ahmed Awesu	Nigeria	10 January 2004	Sharon Anderson Memorial	Toronto, Canada	16 years, 96 days	
200 m								
400 m	47.35	Victor Akhalu	Nigeria	7 March 2020	NJCAA Championships	Lynchburg, United States	16 years, 160 days	
800 m	1:48.12	Mohammed Aman	Ethiopia	8 February 2011	Meeting Pas de Calais	Liévin, France	17 years, 29 days	
1000 m								
1500 m	3:37.61	Melkeneh Azeze	Ethiopia	12 February 2022	PSD Bank Meeting Dortmund	Dortmund, Germany	17 years, 42 days	
Mile								
2000 m	4:57.74	Yomif Kejelcha	Ethiopia	28 February 2014	Meeting National en salle de Metz	Metz, France	16 years, 211 days	
3000 m	7:38.04	Brian Musau	Kenya	2 December 2023	Boston University Sharon Colyear-Danville Season Opener	Boston, United States	16 years, 338 days	
5000 m								
60 m hurdles								
60 m hurdles (91.4 cm)	7.43	Jared Ejiasian	Nigeria	21 February 2026	French U18 Championships	Val-de-Reuil, France	16 years, 83 days	
High jump								
Pole vault								
Long jump								
Triple jump								
Shot put								
Heptathlon								
Heptathlon	60m / Long jump / Shot put / High jump / 60m H / Pole vault / 1000m							
5000 m walk								
4 × 400 m relay								

=== Girls ===
Event	Record	Athlete	Nationality	Date	Meet	Place	Age	Ref.
60 m								
200 m								
400 m								
800 m	2:02.64	Diribe Welteji	Ethiopia	10 February 2019	Meeting Hauts-de-France Pas-de-Calais	Liévin, France	16 years, 273 days	
1500 m	4:01.92	Haregeweyn Kalayu	Ethiopia	3 February 2026	Czech Indoor Gala	Ostrava, Czech Republic	17 years, 33 days	
Mile	4:24.23	Saron Berhe	Ethiopia	30 January 2024	Czech Indoor Gala	Ostrava, Czech Republic	16 years, 156 days	
3000 m	8:39.80	Marta Alemayo	Ethiopia	25 January 2025	Astana Indoor Meeting	Astana, Kazhakstan	16 years, 292 days	
5000 m								
60 m hurdles								
60 m hurdles (76.2 cm)	8.58	Manuella Cancade	Cameroon	17 January 2016		Lyon, France	16 years, 104 days	
High jump								
Pole vault	4.11 m	Sydney Rothman	South Africa	14 February 2007	14e AV PEC 1910 Indoor	Apeldoorn, Netherlands	16 years, 266 days	
Long jump								
Triple jump	13.36 m (Note: 3rd and 5th jumps in series.)	Tessy Ebosele	Nigeria	16 February 2019	Spanish Championships	Antequera, Spain	16 years, 203 days	
Shot put								
Pentathlon								
Pentathlon	60m H / High jump / Shot put / Long jump / 800m							
3000 m walk								
4 × 400 m relay								
