= Joyline Chepkemoi =

Kenyan athlete (born 2007)

Personal information
- Nationality: Kenyan
- Born: 7 January 2007 (age 19)

Sport
- Sport: Athletics
- Events: Long-distance running, Cross Country running

Achievements and titles
- Personal bests: 1500m: 4:13.20 (Ndola, 2023); 3000m: 8:57.02 (Nairobi, 2022); 5000m: 15:09.08 (Eugene, 2026)
Medal record
Women's athletics
Representing Kenya
World U20 Championships
| Bronze medal – third place | 2026 Eugene | 5000 m |
African U20 Championships
| Bronze medal – third place | 2025 Abeokuta | 3000m |
World Cross Country Championships
| Silver medal – second place | 2023 Bathurst | Junior team |
| Silver medal – second place | 2026 Tallahassee | Senior team |

Joyline Chepkemoi (born 7 January 2007) is a Kenyan long-distance and cross country runner.

== Biography ==
A former student at Kalyet Secondary School, Chepkemoi was a bronze medalist in the U20 team event at the 2023 World Athletics Cross Country Championships in Australia, alongside Faith Cherotich and Pamela Kosgei, placing fifth in the individual race. Later that year, she won a silver medal at the 2023 African U18 Championships in Ndola, Zambia in April 2023, finishing runner-up to compatriot Nancy Cherop over 1500 metres.

Chepkemoi won the 5000 metres title at the 2024 Federation of East African Secondary Schools Sports Association (FEASSSA) Games, held in Mbale, Uganda. She retained the title the following year in a time of 15:51.40. She won the bronze medal over 3000 metres at the 2025 African U20 Championships in Abeokuta, Nigeria.

In September 2025, she won the women's U20 race at the Kapsokwony Athletics Kenya Cross Country U20 race. In December 2025, she was selected in the Kenyan team for the 2026 World Athletics Cross Country Championships in Tallahassee, placing 22nd overall.

In May, Chepkemoi finished runner-up in the women's 5000 metres behind Cynthia Chepkirui at the Kenyan U20 Trials in Nairobi. She won the bronze medal over 5000 metres, with a personal best of 15:09.08, finishing behind Charity Cherop of Uganda and Shito Gumi of Kenya, with Chepkirui fourth, at the 2026 World Athletics U20 Championships, running 15:09.08, a personal best by half a minute.
