= 2024 African Cross Country Championships =

- Organisers: CAA
- Edition: 6th
- Date: 25 February 2024
- Host city: Hammamet, Tunisia
- Events: 4
- Participation: 116 athletes from 9 nations

The 2024 African Cross Country Championships was the sixth edition of the international cross country running competition for African athletes organised by the Confederation of African Athletics. It was held on 25 February in Hammamet, Tunisia – the second time a North African nation had hosted the event since its re-launch in 2011. Originally scheduled for 2020 in Togo, the competition was delayed by four years due to the COVID-19 pandemic in Africa and the venue was moved.

There were four races on the program: 10 km for senior men, 10 km for senior women, 8 km for under-20 men, and 6 km for U20 women. There was also an 8 km mixed relay returning from the 2018 edition.

12 countries were originally expected to compete, but 116 athletes from 9 countries actually competed. The races were held on the Yasmine Hammamet golf course with "natural obstacles", and there were strong winds described.

== Medallists ==
Event	Gold		Silver		Bronze	
Senior men's 10 km	Vincent Kibet Langat (KEN)	28:32	Naibei Kiplimo Mayebei (KEN)	28:41	Gemechu Dida (ETH)	28:58
Senior men's team	Kenya	15 pts	Ethiopia	27 pts	Uganda	46 pts
Senior women's 10 km	Cintia Chepngeno (KEN)	32:32	Virginia Nyambura (KEN)	32:34	Degitu Azimeraw (ETH)	33:04
Senior women's team	Kenya	13 pts	Ethiopia	25 pts	Morocco	60 pts
Mixed relay	Kenya	23:29.13	Ethiopia	23:46.41	Morocco	23:49.57
U20 men's 8 km	Gideon Kipngetich (KEN)	23:17	Joash Ruto (KEN)	23:18	Titus Kiprotich (KEN)	23:19
U20 men's team	Kenya	10 pts	Ethiopia	29 pts	Morocco	57 pts
U20 women's 6 km	Robe Dida (ETH)	21:00	Yenenesh Shimeket (ETH)	21:01	Tinebeb Asres (ETH)	21:01
U20 women's team	Ethiopia	10 pts	Kenya	32 pts	Morocco	58 pts

== Results ==
=== Senior races ===
Men's Cross Country 10km Senior Race
Place	Athlete	Age	Country	Time
1st place, gold medalist(s)	Vincent Kibet Langat	23	Kenya	28:32
2nd place, silver medalist(s)	Naibei Kiplimo Mayebei	24	Kenya	28:41
3rd place, bronze medalist(s)	Gemechu Dida	24	Ethiopia	28:58
4	Abel Chebet	30	Uganda	29:02
5	Vincent Kimaiyo	19–20	Kenya	29:05
6	Adisu Negash		Ethiopia	29:13
7	Brian Bushendich		Kenya	29:15
8	Dinkalem Ayele	23	Ethiopia	29:16
9	Fredrick Yeko Domongole	21	Kenya	29:16
10	Enyew Nigate	22	Ethiopia	29:31
11	Levi Kiprotich	29	Uganda	29:34
12	Ezekiel Mutai	23	Uganda	29:48
13	Robert Kiprop	27	Kenya	30:03
14	Hassan Toriss	31	Morocco	30:04
15	Mohamed Amin Jhinaoui	26	Tunisia	30:10
16	Youcef Benkardegh	25	Algeria	30:11
17	Teressa Nyakora	29	Ethiopia	30:29
18	Mustapha Akkaoui	24	Morocco	30:33
19	Elijah Cheptoyek	19	Uganda	30:41
20	Hicham Ouladha	29	Morocco	30:47
21	Mouhcine Outalha	25	Morocco	30:48
22	Nabil el Hannachi	28	Algeria	30:54
23	Hicham Bouchicha	34	Algeria	31:01
24	Youcef Addouche	29	Algeria	31:04
25	Ali Guerine	34	Algeria	31:06
26	Ayoub Dardar	31	Morocco	31:18
27	Ramdane Ouarghi	30	Algeria	31:46
28	Mohamed Ibrahim Jridi	22	Tunisia	31:47
29	Yassine el Allami	32	Morocco	31:53
30	Silva Artur Jorge Fortes		Cape Verde	32:39
31	Makrem Assadi	32–33	Tunisia	32:47
32	Oussama Slimani	22	Tunisia	33:21
33	Nassim Souissi		Tunisia	34:06
34	Yannick Magnan	27	Seychelles	36:09
	Alex Kiplangat	23	Uganda	DNF
	Mogos Tuemay	26	Ethiopia	DNF

Women's Cross Country 10km Senior Race
Place	Athlete	Age	Country	Time
1st place, gold medalist(s)	Cintia Chepngeno	23	Kenya	32:32
2nd place, silver medalist(s)	Virginia Nyambura Nganga	30	Kenya	32:34
3rd place, bronze medalist(s)	Degitu Azimeraw	25	Ethiopia	33:04
4	Gladys Kwamboka	27	Kenya	33:11
5	Anchinalu Dessie	21	Ethiopia	33:26
6	Caren Chebet	23	Kenya	33:40
7	Beatrice Nyaboke Begi	25	Kenya	33:51
8	Tsige Haileslase	23	Ethiopia	34:07
9	Gelaw Yalga Sewagegn		Ethiopia	34:07
10	Sandra Tuei	26	Kenya	34:18
11	Fantaye Belayneh	23	Ethiopia	35:09
12	Ayana Demilew Zemenay		Ethiopia	35:09
13	Hanane Bouaggad	26	Morocco	35:42
14	Hanane Qallouj	32	Morocco	35:59
15	Malika Benderbal	40	Algeria	36:11
16	Kawtar Kahhaz	25	Morocco	36:29
17	Fatima Aafir	20	Morocco	36:38
18	Hasna Zahi	33	Morocco	37:04

=== U20 races ===
Men's Cross Country 8km U20 Race
Place	Athlete	Age	Country	Time
1st place, gold medalist(s)	Gideon Kipngetich	17	Kenya	23:17
2nd place, silver medalist(s)	Joash Ruto	17	Kenya	23:18
3rd place, bronze medalist(s)	Titus Kiprotich	18	Kenya	23:19
4	Simon Maywa	18	Kenya	23:22
5	Hagos Eyob	17	Ethiopia	23:25
6	Clinton Kimutai Ngetich	16	Kenya	23:30
7	Abdisa Fayisa	18	Ethiopia	23:36
8	Simachew Sewnet		Ethiopia	23:47
9	Regasa Seyoum Beharu		Ethiopia	24:04
10	Nibret Kinde	18	Ethiopia	24:08
11	Joseph Njoroge Wanjiru	18	Kenya	24:24
12	Oussama Redouani	17	Morocco	24:25
13	Negasa Dekeba		Ethiopia	24:26
14	Ilyas Aaourdou	18	Morocco	24:31
15	Mohammed el Mobaraky	18	Morocco	25:19
16	Abdelwahed Aachour	18	Morocco	25:30
17	Ahmed Faris	18	Morocco	25:35
18	Zouhair Redouane	19	Morocco	26:05
19	Rayen Mejri		Tunisia	26:44
20	Hamza Hizewi		Tunisia	27:54
21	Iheb Khaskhoussi	17–18	Tunisia	28:10
22	Mouad ben Salah		Libya	29:43
23	Asil Amer Mabrouk Abouras		Libya	29:56
24	Abdoussalam Hibu		Libya	31:13
25	Paul Uranietiphano		Seychelles	32:02
26	Mustapha Mohamed Raddou		Libya	32:43
27	Mohamed Baloumi		Libya	32:47
28	Omar Elgomati		Libya	36:11
	Omar Douzi		Tunisia	DNF

Women's Cross Country 6km U20 Race
Place	Athlete	Age	Country	Time
1st place, gold medalist(s)	Robe Dida	17	Ethiopia	21:00
2nd place, silver medalist(s)	Yenenesh Shimeket	17	Ethiopia	21:01
3rd place, bronze medalist(s)	Tinebeb Asres	18	Ethiopia	21:01
4	Mekedes Alemeshete	17	Ethiopia	21:03
5	Abera Olekaba Kokbe		Ethiopia	21:04
6	Judy Chepkoech	17–18	Kenya	21:04
7	Marion Jepngetich	18	Kenya	21:06
8	Bude Almaz Yohannis		Ethiopia	21:08
9	Lucy Nduta	18	Kenya	21:10
10	Sharon Chepkemoi	17	Kenya	21:12
11	Cynthia Chepkirui	15	Kenya	21:20
12	Judy Kemunto	18	Kenya	21:59
13	Houssna Ibn Abdel Matey	17	Morocco	22:05
14	Saida el-Bouzy	16	Morocco	22:24
15	Khaddouj el Bali	17	Morocco	22:24
16	Hassana Ibn Abdel Matey	17	Morocco	22:29
17	Hiba Ghizlane	18	Morocco	22:55

=== Mixed relay ===
Place	Country	Athlete	Time
1st place, gold medalist(s)	Kenya		23:29.13
2nd place, silver medalist(s)	Ethiopia		23:46.41
3rd place, bronze medalist(s)	Morocco		23:49.57
4.	Tunisia		24:55.05

== See also ==
- 2024 Asian Cross Country Championships
- 2024 European Cross Country Championships
