= 2026 World Athletics U20 Championships – Women's 5000 metres =

Women's 5000 metres at the 2026 World Athletics U20 Championships
- Venue: Hayward Field
- Dates: 5 August (Final)
- Competitors: 26 from 17 nations
- Winning time: 15:03.88

Medalists
gold medal	Charity Cherop	Uganda
silver medal	Shito Gumi	Ethiopia
bronze medal	Joyline Chepkemoi	Kenya

The women's 5000 metres at the 2026 World Athletics U20 Championships was held at Hayward Field in Eugene, United States on 5 August 2026.

== Records ==
U20 standing records prior to the 2026 World Athletics U20 Championships were as follows:

Record	Athlete & Nationality	Mark	Location	Date
World U20 Record	Tirunesh Dibaba (ETH)	14:30.88	Eugene, United States	11 June 2004
Championship Record	Mekedes Alemeshete (ETH)	14:57.44	Lima, Peru	27 August 2024
World U20 Leading	Marta Alemayo (ETH)	14:32.84	Shaoxing, China	16 May 2026

== Results ==
=== Final ===
The final took place in the afternoon session on 5 August 2026.

Place	Athlete	Nation	Time	Notes
1st place, gold medalist(s)	Charity Cherop	Uganda	15:03.88	
2nd place, silver medalist(s)	Shito Gumi	Ethiopia	15:07.91	
3rd place, bronze medalist(s)	Joyline Chepkemoi	Kenya	15:09.08	PB
4	Cynthia Chepkirui	Kenya	15:14.86	
5	Carmen Cernjul	Sweden	15:22.18	
6	Emebet Tilahun	Ethiopia	15:32.51	
7	Yui Onotora	Japan	15:37.33	
8	Bentalin Yeko	Uganda	15:48.35	
9	Julia Ehrle	Germany	16:09.53	
10	Lamia Mourabit	France	16:10.80	
11	Carolina Correia	Portugal	16:11.47	PB
12	Venus Abraham Teffera	Norway	16:12.07	PB
13	Laly Porentru	France	16:12.62	
14	Ayami Yoshida	Japan	16:12.76	
15	Gloria Herold	Germany	16:13.75	PB
16	Rosalie ten Bruggencate	Netherlands	16:15.95	
17	Sofia Ferrari	Italy	16:18.16	
18	Mimosa Miari Fulcis	Italy	16:30.40	
19	Fatima Hernandez	Spain	16:31.98	
20	Anina Hirzel	Switzerland	16:36.73	
21	Eliza Nicholson	Great Britain	16:45.92	
22	Airlie Downie-Back	Canada	16:59.68	
23	Kenya Cuahutle	Mexico	17:05.87	
24	Athena Andrecyk	Canada	17:06.39	
25	Libby Mantay	Australia	17:07.68	
26	Imogen Baker	Australia	17:25.93	
