= 2024 World Athletics Cross Country Championships – U20 women's race =

U20 women's race at the 2024 World Athletics Cross Country Championships
- Organisers: World Athletics
- Edition: 45th
- Date: 30 March 2024
- Host city: Belgrade, Serbia
- Events: 1
- Distances: 6 km – U20 women
- Participation: 83 athletes from 21 nations

The U20 women's race at the 2024 World Athletics Cross Country Championships was held in Belgrade, Serbia on 30 March 2024, at 11:00 AM local time. Marta Alemayo won the individual race, four seconds ahead of Asayech Ayichew. Two of the Kenyan U20 team members were denied immigration visas by the hosts, allowing Ethiopia to win the team title.

== Race results ==
=== U20 women's race (6 km) ===
==== Individual ====
Women's Cross Country U20 Race
Place	Athlete	Age	Country	Time
1st place, gold medalist(s)	Marta Alemayo	15	Ethiopia	19:28
2nd place, silver medalist(s)	Asayech Ayichew	18	Ethiopia	19:32
3rd place, bronze medalist(s)	Robe Dida	17	Ethiopia	19:38
4	Sheila Jebet	18	Kenya	19:45
5	Diana Cherotich	18	Kenya	19:47
6	Yenawa Nbret	16	Ethiopia	19:50
7	Deborah Chemutai	18	Kenya	19:51
8	Lemlem Nibret	19	Ethiopia	20:01
9	Shito Gumi	17	Ethiopia	20:02
10	Nowel Cheruto	17	Uganda	20:04
11	Charity Cherop	16	Uganda	20:23
12	Mercy Chepkemoi	18	Kenya	20:43
13	Keziah Chebet	15	Uganda	20:47
14	Vicky Chekwemboi	18	Uganda	20:49
15	Ellie Shea	18	United States	20:50
16	Allie Zealand	17	United States	21:08
17	Innes FitzGerald	17	Great Britain	21:10
18	Jess Bailey	17	Great Britain	21:12
19	Miyu Murakami	16	Japan	21:12
20	Misaki Shitamori	18	Japan	21:19
21	Gabrielle Schmidt	18	Australia	21:19
22	Margot Dajoux	18	France	21:19
23	Ambre Grasset	17	France	21:19
24	Elsa Sundqvist	18	Sweden	21:20
25	Eliza Nicholson	16	Great Britain	21:27
26	Chiseno Ikeda	18	Japan	21:32
27	Isella Chebet	15	Uganda	21:40
28	Mary Dalton	18	United States	21:40
29	Zariel Macchia	17	United States	21:42
30	Natasha Phillips	19	Great Britain	21:42
31	Li-mari Dekker	18	South Africa	21:43
32	Chloe Turner	18	Canada	21:46
33	Aoi Hosokawa	17	Japan	21:46
34	Saima Murić	17	Serbia	21:48
35	Catherine Lund	18	New Zealand	21:53
36	Sienna Bush	15	Australia	21:55
37	Anna Gardiner	18	Ireland	21:58
38	Charli-Rose Carlyon	18	Australia	21:59
39	Kirsty Maher	18	Ireland	22:10
40	Narumi Okumoto	18	Japan	22:12
41	Jolena Quarzo	18	United States	22:13
42	Abby Lewis	17	Canada	22:17
43	Alexandra Schulz	18	Australia	22:20
44	Zara Geddes	18	New Zealand	22:21
45	Béatrice Filion	17	Canada	22:23
46	Arina Gladysheva	18	Kazakhstan	22:24
47	Khaddouj el Bali	18	Morocco	22:24
48	Emma Mendez	18	Spain	22:34
49	Maddie Gardiner	17	United States	22:36
50	Omaatla Dikao	16	South Africa	22:39
51	Saida el-Bouzy	16	Morocco	22:40
52	Houssna Ibn Abdel Matey	17	Morocco	22:40
53	Gretta Johnson	17	Australia	22:44
54	Lara van der Merwe	16	South Africa	22:44
55	Emma de Jong	18	Australia	22:46
56	Stephanie Bertram	17	Canada	22:49
57	Mickaella Aguera	18	France	22:51
58	Caroline Dennilauler	18	France	22:56
59	Charlotte Sinke	18	Canada	23:01
60	Wiepke Schoeman	17	South Africa	23:01
61	Muriel Lovshin	17	Canada	23:10
62	Boh Ritchie	17	New Zealand	23:18
63	Laura Camargo	18	Colombia	23:25
64	Daniela Rubio	17	Spain	23:27
65	Paballo Dlothi	15	South Africa	23:36
66	Natalija Grujić	18	Serbia	23:37
67	Yessica Patatingo	18	Peru	23:39
68	Ines Herault	17	Spain	23:43
69	Hassana Ibn Abdel Matey	17	Morocco	23:45
70	Luz Lizandra Arias	18	Peru	23:46
71	Anoxolo McEtywa	15	South Africa	23:47
72	Miranda Duran	18	Mexico	24:00
73	Ava Sutherland	17	New Zealand	24:14
74	Marwa el Khouya	17	Spain	24:21
75	Lenka Nikolić	17	Serbia	24:25
76	Poppy Martin	18	New Zealand	24:30
77	Jade le Corre	18	France	24:32
78	Yoselin Limache	18	Peru	24:46
79	Saniya Kudaibergen	17	Kazakhstan	25:18
80	Ayana Bolatbekkyzy	17	Kazakhstan	26:10
	Hiba Ghizlane	18	Morocco	DNS
	Mejra Mehmedović	17	Serbia	DNF
	Jana Rajić	15	Serbia	DNF
	Previous Munsaka	18	Zimbabwe	DNF

==== Team ====
Ethiopia swept the top three places and won the team title. The teams were scored by the sum of the top four runners' placings, with ties being broken on the fifth runner's position.

Rank	Team	Score
1st place, gold medalist(s)	Ethiopia	12
2nd place, silver medalist(s)	Kenya	28
3rd place, bronze medalist(s)	Uganda	48
4	United States	88
5	United Kingdom	90
6	Japan	98
7	Australia	138
8	France	160
9	Canada	175
10	South Africa	195
11	New Zealand	214
12	Morocco	219
13	Spain	254
