= 2024 African Championships in Athletics – Women's 1500 metres =

Women's 1500 metres at the 2024 African Championships in Athletics
- Venue: Japoma Stadium
- Location: Douala, Cameroon
- Dates: 25 June (heats); 26 June (final)
- Competitors: 16 from 10 nations
- Winning time: 4:06.05

Medalists
gold medal	Saron Berhe	Ethiopia
silver medal	Caroline Nyaga	Kenya
bronze medal	Esther Chebet	Uganda

The women's 1500 metres event at the 2024 African Championships in Athletics was held on 25 and 26 June in Douala, Cameroon.

== Records ==
Records before the 2024 African Athletics Championships
Record	Athlete (nation)	Time (s)	Location	Date
World record	Faith Kipyegon (KEN)	3:49.11	Florence, Italy	2 June 2023
African record	Faith Kipyegon (KEN)	3:49.11	Florence, Italy	2 June 2023
Championship record	Caster Semenya (RSA)	4:01.99	Durban, South Africa	24 June 2016
World leading	Gudaf Tsegay (ETH)	3:50.30	Xiamen, China	20 April 2024
African leading	Gudaf Tsegay (ETH)	3:50.30	Xiamen, China	20 April 2024

== Results ==
=== Heats ===
Qualification: First 6 of each heat qualified directly (Q) for the final.

Rank	Heat	Name	Nationality	Time	Notes
1	1	Esther Chebet	Uganda	4:14.22	Q
2	1	Saron Berhe	Ethiopia	4:14.28	Q
3	1	Tigist Girma	Ethiopia	4:14.83	Q
4	2	Netsanet Desta	Ethiopia	4:15.12	Q
5	2	Knight Aciru	Uganda	4:15.39	Q
6	2	Teresia Gateri	Kenya	4:15.53	Q
7	1	Carina Viljoen	South Africa	4:15.93	Q
8	1	Caroline Nyaga	Kenya	4:16.24	Q
9	2	Belinda Chemutai	Uganda	4:16.25	Q
10	2	Kadra Mohamed Dembil	Djibouti	4:17.06	Q
11	1	Roza Haile	Eritrea	4:20.36	Q
12	2	Comfort James	Nigeria	4:20.51	Q
13	1	Fraida Hassanatte	Chad	4:26.88	
14	1	Liliane Nguetsa	Cameroon	4:28.51	
15	2	Odette Sawekoua	Benin	4:33.75	
16	2	Kerlane Dane Nassourou	Cameroon	4:52.51	
	1	Soukaina Hajji	Morocco	DNS	
	1	Joana Heleca	Angola	DNS	
	2	Mercy Wanjiru Gitahi	Kenya	DNS	
	2	Ajith Thalang Juli	South Sudan	DNS	

=== Final ===
Rank	Athlete	Nationality	Time	Notes
1st place, gold medalist(s)	Saron Berhe	Ethiopia	4:06.05	
2nd place, silver medalist(s)	Caroline Nyaga	Kenya	4:06.76	
3rd place, bronze medalist(s)	Esther Chebet	Uganda	4:06.90	
4	Knight Aciru	Uganda	4:08.09	
5	Teresia Gateri	Kenya	4:08.90	
6	Tigist Girma	Ethiopia	4:10.49	
7	Netsanet Desta	Ethiopia	4:12.49	
8	Belinda Chemutai	Uganda	4:12.89	
9	Carina Viljoen	South Africa	4:13.27	
10	Kadra Mohamed Dembil	Djibouti	4:20.82	
11	Roza Haile	Eritrea	4:24.06	
	Comfort James	Nigeria	DNS	

== See also ==
- Athletics at the 2023 African Games – Women's 1500 metres
