= Bujar =

Bujar is an Albanian masculine given name which means generous. People named Bujar include:

- Bujar Asqeriu (born 1956), Albanian actor
- Bujar Bukoshi (1947-2025), Kosovar politician
- Bujar Çani (1946–2012), Albanian footballer
- Bujar Dida (born 1961), Albanian chemist and diplomat
- Bujar Hoxha, Albanian chess player
- Bujar Idrizi (born 1991), Kosovar footballer
- Bujar Lako (1947–2016), Albanian actor
- Bujar Lika (born 1992), Swiss-Albanian footballer
- Bujar Nishani (1966–2022), Albanian politician, the sixth President of Albania
- Bujar Osmani (born 1979), Albanian politician from Macedonia
- Bujar Pllana (born 2001), Kosovan footballer
- Bujar Shehu (born 1939), Albanian basketball player and coach
- Bujar Spahiu (born 1976), Albanian Muslim scholar
