= 2026 World Athletics U20 Championships – Women's 3000 metres =

Women's 3000 metres at the 2026 World Athletics U20 Championships
- Venue: Hayward Field
- Dates: 8 August (Final)
- Competitors: 27 from 17 nations
- Winning time: 8:43.65 PB

Medalists
gold medal	Yordanos Tsigab	Ethiopia
silver medal	Shito Gumi	Ethiopia
bronze medal	Charity Cherop	Uganda

The women's 3000 metres at the 2026 World Athletics U20 Championships was held at Hayward Field in Eugene, United States on 8 August 2026.

== Records ==
U20 standing records prior to the 2026 World Athletics U20 Championships were as follows:

Record	Athlete & Nationality	Mark	Location	Date
World U20 Record	Zola Pieterse (GBR)	8:28.83	Rome, Italy	7 September 1985
Championship Record	Beyenu Degefa (ETH)	8:41.76	Bydgoszcz, Poland	20 July 2016
World U20 Leading	Marta Alemayo (ETH)	8:29.09	London, United Kingdom	18 July 2026

== Results ==
=== Final ===
The final took place in the afternoon session on 8 August 2026.

Place	Athlete	Nation	Time	Notes
1st place, gold medalist(s)	Yordanos Tsigab	Ethiopia	8:43.65	PB
2nd place, silver medalist(s)	Shito Gumi	Ethiopia	8:45.06	
3rd place, bronze medalist(s)	Charity Cherop	Uganda	8:45.59	
4	Carmen Cernjul	Sweden	8:52.60	NU20R
5	Yuua Nagamori	Japan	8:56.93	PB
6	Mercy Chepngeno Mageso	Kenya	8:57.43	PB
7	Wilma Torbiörnsson	Norway	9:00.70	PB
8	Julia Ehrle	Germany	9:13.61	SB
9	Eliza Lawton	Australia	9:13.62	
10	Bentalin Yeko	Uganda	9:13.74	
11	Sofia Ferrari	Italy	9:17.44	PB
12	Allison Wasson	Canada	9:18.13	PB
13	Rongli Su	China	9:18.45	
14	Sandrine Niyomugenga	Rwanda	9:18.76	NU20R
15	Eleanor Voykin	Canada	9:18.88	PB
16	Katie Pye	Great Britain	9:19.09	
17	Kaate Mulders	Netherlands	9:20.57	
18	Venus Abraham Teffera	Norway	9:20.78	
19	Faith Rono	Kenya	9:21.35	
20	Nodoka Ashida	Japan	9:24.85	SB
21	Chiara Dailey	United States	9:24.92	
22	Fanny Szalkai	Sweden	9:28.40	
23	Anna Marianna Jędrzejczyk	Poland	9:30.57	
24	Rosalie ten Bruggencate	Netherlands	9:32.51	
25	Scarlett Robb	New Zealand	9:35.78	
26	Viola Paoletti	Italy	9:38.84	
27	Imogen Baker	Australia	9:58.93	
