= List of world under-18 bests in athletics =

Under-18 world best performances in the sport of athletics are the best marks set in competition by athletes aged 17 or younger throughout the entire calendar year of the performance. World Athletics (formerly IAAF) maintains an official list for such performances, but only in specific outdoor and indoor events.^{[note 1]} All other records shown on this list are tracked by statisticians not officially sanctioned by the world governing body. These age category records were formerly called world youth bests.

== Outdoor ==
Key: "Best" not kept by World Athletics Not recognized or later rescinded by World Athletics

=== Boys ===
Event	Record	Athlete	Nationality	Date	Meet	Place	Age	Ref.	Video
100 m	10.00 (+1.7 m/s)	Sorato Shimizu	Japan	26 July 2025	All Japan High School Championships	Hiroshima, Japan	16 years, 168 days		
200 m	19.84 (+0.3 m/s)	Erriyon Knighton	United States	27 June 2021	U.S. Olympic Trials	Eugene, United States	17 years, 149 days		
300 m	33.26	Yohei Ozawa	Japan	11 October 2024	National Sports Festival	Saga, Japan	17 years, 72 days		
400 m	44.10	Quincy Wilson	United States	12 July 2025	Ed Murphey Classic	Memphis, United States	17 years, 185 days		
600 m	1:16.13	Xai Ricks	United States	4 February 2023	VS Athletics CA Winter Championships	Arcadia, California, United States	16 years, 206 days		
800 m	1:42.27	Cooper Lutkenhaus	United States	3 August 2025	USA Championships	Eugene, United States	16 years, 227 days		
1000 m	2:17.44	Hamza Driouch	Qatar	9 August 2011	Formtoppningen & Kastkvitter	Sollentuna, Sweden	16 years, 266 days		
1500 m	3:33.26	Cameron Myers	Australia	16 July 2023	Kamila Skolimowska Memorial	Chorzów, Poland	17 years, 37 days		
Mile	3:54.56 (Note: outdoor best; indoor mark ratified as absolute record)	Isaac Kiprono Songok	Kenya	20 August 2001		Linz, Austria	17 years, 117 days		
Mile (road)	4:03.85	Tiisetso Malungane	South Africa	16 June 2026	Curro Street Mile	Pretoria, South Africa	16 years, 152 days		
2000 m	4:56.86	Isaac Kiprono Songok	Kenya	31 August 2001	ISTAF	Berlin, Germany	17 years, 128 days		
3000 m	7:32.37	Abreham Cherkos	Ethiopia	11 July 2006	Athletissima	Lausanne, Switzerland	16 years, 291 days		
Two miles	8:16.07	Abreham Cherkos	Ethiopia	28 May 2006		Eugene, United States	16 years, 247 days		
5000 m	12:54.19	Abreham Cherkos	Ethiopia	14 July 2006	Golden Gala	Rome, Italy	16 years, 294 days		
5 km (road)	13:04	Biniam Mehary	Ethiopia	9 December 2023	Annual Charity Run	Al Khobar, Saudi Arabia	16 years, 354 days		
10,000 m	27:02.81	Ibrahim Jeilan	Ethiopia	25 August 2006	Memorial Van Damme	Brussels, Belgium	17 years, 74 days		
10 km (road)	28:05	Abayneh Degu	Ethiopia	11 October 2015	Grand 10 Berlin	Berlin, Germany	16 years, 314 days		
20 km (road)	58:20	Phaustin Baha Sulle	Tanzania	17 October 1999	20 Kilomètres de Paris	Paris, France	17 years, 140 days		
Half marathon	1:00:38	Phaustin Baha Sulle	Tanzania	4 September 1999	Lille Half Marathon	Lille, France	17 years, 97 days		
Marathon	2:11:43	Li He	China	14 October 2001	Beijing Marathon	Beijing, China	17 years, 225 days		
110 m hurdles (91.4 cm)	12.87 (+1.6 m/s)	Sasha Zhoya	Australia/France	6 July 2019	French U18/U20 Championship	Angers, France	17 years, 11 days		
110 m hurdles (99/100 cm)	13.29 (−1.0 m/s)	Wilhem Belocian	France	12 July 2012	World Junior Championships	Barcelona, Spain	17 years, 20 days		
110 m hurdles (106.7 cm)	13.32 (+0.7 m/s)	Dejour Russell	Jamaica	24 June 2017	Jamaican National Senior Championship	Kingston, Jamaica	17 years, 84 days		
300 m hurdles (91.4 cm)	36.45	Bershawn Jackson	United States	13 May 2000		Gainesville, United States	17 years, 5 days		
400 m hurdles (84.0 cm)	48.84	Sokwakhana Zazini	South Africa	17 March 2017	Gauteng North Championships	Pretoria, South Africa	16 years, 175 days		
400 m hurdles (91.4 cm)	47.93	Taiju Goto	Japan	28 September 2026	Asian Games	Nagoya, Japan	17 years, 146 days		
1500 m steeplechase	4:04.85	Antonio Álvarez	Spain	25 June 1993		Málaga, Spain	16 years, 126 days		
2000 m steeplechase	5:19.99	Meresa Kahsay	Ethiopia	12 July 2013	World Youth Championships	Donetsk, Ukraine	17 years, 50 days		
3000 m steeplechase	8:12.28	Getnet Wale	Ethiopia	11 June 2017	Fanny Blankers-Koen Games	Hengelo, Netherlands	16 years, 330 days		
High jump	2.33 m	Javier Sotomayor	Cuba	19 May 1984		Havana, Cuba	16 years, 219 days		
Pole vault	5.56 m (Note: indoor mark ratified as absolute record)	Sasha Zhoya	Australia/France	1 April 2019	Australian Junior Championships	Sydney, Australia	16 years, 280 days		
Long jump	8.28 m (+1.8 m/s)	Maykel Massó	Cuba	28 May 2016	Memorial Barrientos	Havana, Cuba	17 years, 20 days		
Triple jump	17.41 m (+1.0 m/s)	Jordan A. Díaz	Cuba	8 June 2018		Havana, Cuba	17 years, 105 days		
Shot put (5 kg)	24.45 m	Jacko Gill	New Zealand	19 December 2011	Auckland Millenium Shot Put Invitational	Auckland, New Zealand	16 years, 327 days		
Shot put (5.44 kg)	21.90 m	Arnold Campbell	United States	28 May 1983		Winter Park, United States	16 years, 194 days		
Shot put (6 kg)	22.31 m	Jacko Gill	New Zealand	5 December 2011		North Shore City, New Zealand	16 years, 350 days		
Shot put (7.26 kg)	20.38 m	Jacko Gill	New Zealand	5 December 2011		North Shore City, New Zealand	16 years, 350 days		
Discus throw (1.5 kg)	77.50 m	Mykyta Nesterenko	Ukraine	19 May 2008	Koncha-Zaspa Ukrainian Throwing Meeting	Kyiv (Koncha Zaspa), Ukraine	17 years, 34 days		
Discus throw (1.75 kg)	70.13 m	Mykyta Nesterenko	Ukraine	24 May 2008		Halle (Saale), Germany	17 years, 39 days		
Discus throw (2 kg)	65.31 m	Mykyta Nesterenko	Ukraine	3 June 2008		Tallinn, Estonia	17 years, 49 days		
Hammer throw (5 kg)	87.82 m	Mykhaylo Kokhan	Ukraine	7 July 2018	European U18 Championships	Győr, Hungary	17 years, 166 days		
Hammer throw (6 kg)	85.57 m	Ashraf Amgad Elseify	Qatar	14 July 2012	World Junior Championships	Barcelona, Spain	17 years, 145 days		
Hammer throw (7.26 kg)	73.66 m	Vladislav Piskunov	Ukraine	11 June 1994		Kyiv, Ukraine	16 years, 4 days		
Javelin throw (700 g)	89.34 m	Braian Toledo	Argentina	6 March 2010	Mar del Plata Evaluativo Nacional	Mar del Plata, Argentina	16 years, 179 days		
Javelin throw (800 g)	79.96 m	Aki Parviainen	Finland	12 September 1991		Pyhäselkä, Finland	16 years, 321 days		
Octathlon	6491 pts	Jake Stein	Australia	6–7 July 2011	World Youth Championships	Lille, France	17 years, 171 days		
Octathlon	100m (wind) / Long jump (wind) / Shot put / 400m / 110m H (wind) / High jump / Javelin / 1000m; 11.52 (−0.5 m/s) / 7.22 m (+1.2 m/s) / 17.22 m / 51.32 / 14.25 (−1.0 m/s) / 1.98 m / 59.65 m / 2:52.93								
Decathlon (Youth)	8002 pts	Niklas Kaul	Germany	15–16 July 2015	World Youth Championships	Cali, Colombia	17 years, 155 days		
Decathlon (Youth)	100m (wind) / Long jump (wind) / Shot put / High jump / 400m / 110m H (wind) / Discus / Pole vault / Javelin / 1500m; 11.59 (−0.2 m/s) / 6.76 m (+1.1 m/s) / 16.08 m (5 kg) / 2.05 m / 51.20 / 15.44 (−0.7 m/s) (91.4 cm) / 44.09 m (1.5 kg) / 4.70 m / 78.20 m / 4:42.29								
Decathlon (Senior)	8104 pts h	Valter Külvet	Estonia	22–23 August 1981		Viimsi, Soviet Union	17 years, 185 days		
Decathlon (Senior)	100m (wind) / Long jump (wind) / Shot put / High jump / 400m / 110m H (wind) / Discus / Pole vault / Javelin / 1500m; 10.7w h / 7.26 m w / 13.86 m / 2.09 m / 48.5 h / 14.8 h / 47.92 m / 4.50 m / 60.34 m / 4:37.8 h								
Decathlon (Senior)	7829 pts	Valter Külvet	Estonia	12–13 September 1981		Stockholm, Sweden	17 years, 206 days		
Decathlon (Senior)	100m (wind) / Long jump (wind) / Shot put / High jump / 400m / 110m H (wind) / Discus / Pole vault / Javelin / 1500m; 11.34 / 7.12 m / 14.10 m / 2.08 m / 49.65 / 15.24 / 48.02 m / 4.20 m / 59.90 m / 4:37.07								
Mile walk	6:08.45	Riley Coughlan	Australia	14 December 2023	Collingwood Classic	Melbourne, Australia	16 years, 334 days		
3000 m walk	11:32.9 h	Douglas Connolly	Australia	27 November 1999		Sydney, Australia			
5000 m walk	19:35.79	Yuki Yamazaki	Japan	23 September 2001		Toyama, Japan	17 years, 250 days		
10,000 m walk (track)	39:27.10	Emiliano Barba	Mexico	30 August 2024	World U20 Championships	Lima, Peru	17 years, 160 days		
10 km walk (road)	38:57	Li Tianlei	China	18 September 2010	IAAF Race Walking Challenge Final	Beijing, China	15 years, 248 days		
20,000 m walk (track)	1:23:37.21	Li Tianlei	China	18 September 2012	Chinese University Games	Tianjin, China	17 years, 249 days		
20 km walk (road)	1:18:07	Li Gaobo	China	23 April 2005		Cixi, China	15 years, 274 days		
50,000 m walk (track)	4:22:13.4	Bengt Simonsen	Sweden	19 October 1974		Gothenburg, Sweden	16 years, 210 days		
50 km walk (road)	3:45:46	Yu Guoping	China	23 November 2001		Guangzhou, China	15 years, 163 days		
4 × 100 m relay	39.97	Michali Everett; Tyreke Wilson; Xavier Nairne; Michael Stephens	Jamaica	15 April 2017	CARIFTA Games	Willemstad, Curaçao	16 years, 78 days 17 years, 95 days 16 years, 195 days 16 years, 239 days		
4 × 400 m relay	3:11.66	Asa Guevara; Machel Cedenio; Reubin Walters; Theon Lewis	Trinidad and Tobago	1 July 2012	CAC Junior Championships	San Salvador, El Salvador	16 years, 194 days 16 years, 299 days		
Swedish medley relay	1:49.23	Waseem Williams; Michael O'Hara; Okeen Williams; Martin Manley	Jamaica	14 July 2013	World Youth Championships	Donetsk, Ukraine	16 years, 187 days 16 years, 288 days 16 years, 126 days		

=== Girls ===
Event	Record	Athlete	Nationality	Date	Meet	Place	Age	Ref.	Video
100 m	10.98 (+2.0 m/s)	Candace Hill	United States	20 June 2015	Brooks PR Invitational	Shoreline, United States	16 years, 129 days		
100 m	10.94 (+0.6 m/s) X (Note: Williams later tested positive for the banned substance hydrochlorothiazide and her results from the championships were nullified.)	Briana Williams	Jamaica	21 June 2019	Jamaican Championships	Kingston, Jamaica	17 years, 92 days		
200 m	22.42 (+1.7 m/s)	Amy Hunt	Great Britain	30 June 2019	Mannheim Junior Gala	Mannheim, Germany	17 years, 46 days		
300 m	36.46	Linsey MacDonald	Great Britain	13 July 1980		London, United Kingdom	16 years, 152 days		
400 m	50.01	Li Jing	China	18 October 1997	Chinese National Games	Shanghai, China	17 years, 246 days		
600 m	1:25.22	Sophia Gorriaran	United States	30 April 2022	Penn Relays	Philadelphia, United States	16 years, 314 days		
800 m	1:57.18	Wang Yuan	China	8 September 1993	Chinese National Games	Beijing, China	17 years, 153 days		
1000 m	2:37.9 h	Zola Budd	South Africa	7 February 1983		Bloemfontein, South Africa	16 years, 257 days		
1500 m	3:54.52	Ling Zhang	China	18 October 1997	Chinese National Games	Shanghai, China	16 years, 188 days		
Mile	4:23.78	Elsabet Amare	Ethiopia	13 June 2026	Meeting Nikaïa	Nice, France	17 years, 110 days		
Mile (road)	4:36.51	Agnes Jebet Ngetich	Kenya	8 December 2018	Honolulu Kalakaua Merrie Mile	Honolulu, United States	17 years, 319 days		
2000 m	5:46.5+	Sally Barsosio	Kenya	16 August 1995	Weltklasse Zürich	Zürich, Switzerland	17 years, 148 days		
3000 m	8:32.20	Marta Alemayo	Ethiopia	25 May 2025	Meeting International Mohammed VI d'Athlétisme de Rabat	Rabat, Morocco	17 years, 47 days		
5000 m	14:34.46	Marta Alemayo	Ethiopia	19 July 2025	London Athletics Meet	London, United Kingdom	17 years, 102 days		
5 km (road)	14:44	Yenawa Nbret	Ethiopia	9 December 2023	Annual Charity Run	Khobar, Saudi Arabia	16 years, 205 days		
5 km (road)	14:44	Marta Alemayo	Ethiopia	14 December 2024	Al Sharqiyah International 5KM	Khobar, Saudi Arabia	16 years, 250 days		
10,000 m	31:11.26	Song Liqing	China	19 October 1997	Chinese National Games	Shanghai, China	17 years, 272 days		
10 km (road)	30:38	Yenawa Nbret	Ethiopia	22 September 2024	tRUNsylvania International 10K	Brasov, Romania	17 years, 127 days		
Half marathon	1:08:25	Alem Nigussie	Ethiopia	20 October 2019	Delhi Half Marathon	New Delhi, India	17 years, 292 days		
Marathon	2:25:15	Sun Weiwei	China	20 October 2002	Beijing Marathon	Beijing, China	16 years, 279 days		
100 m hurdles (76.2 cm)	12.71 (+0.8 m/s)	Kerrica Hill	Jamaica	9 April 2022	ISSA/Grace Kennedy Boys and Girls Championships	Kingston, Jamaica	17 years, 34 days		
100 m hurdles (83.8 cm)	12.77 (+0.2 m/s)	Kerrica Hill	Jamaica	6 August 2022	World U20 Championships	Cali, Colombia	17 years, 153 days		
200 m hurdles	26.68	Sharon Colyear-Danville	Great Britain	16 July 1971		London, United Kingdom	16 years, 85 days		
300 m hurdles	40.10	Ebony Collins	United States	4 June 2005		Sacramento, United States	16 years, 85 days		
400 m hurdles	54.15	Sydney McLaughlin	United States	10 July 2016	United States Olympic Trials	Eugene, United States	16 years, 338 days		
2000 m steeplechase	6:07.72	Jolanda Kallabis	Germany	10 September 2022	SWT-Flutlichtmeeting	Trier, Germany	17 years, 204 days		
3000 m steeplechase	9:24.73	Celliphine Chepteek Chespol	Kenya	14 May 2016	Shanghai Golden Grand Prix	Shanghai, China	17 years, 52 days		
High jump	1.96 m	Olga Turchak	Soviet Union	7 September 1984		Donetsk, Soviet Union	17 years, 186 days		
High jump	1.96 m	Eleanor Patterson	Australia	7 December 2013	Australian All Schools Championships	Townsville, Australia	17 years, 199 days		
High jump	1.96 m	Vashti Cunningham	United States	1 August 2015	Pan American Junior Championships	Edmonton, Canada	17 years, 195 days		
High jump	1.96 m A	Charmaine Weavers	South Africa	4 April 1981		Bloemfontein, South Africa	17 years, 36 days		
High jump	1.96 m	Angelina Topić	Serbia	26 June 2022	Serbian Championships	Kruševac, Serbia	16 years, 335 days		
High jump	1.96 m	Karmen Bruus	Estonia	19 July 2022	World Championships	Eugene, United States	17 years, 176 days		
Pole vault	4.52 m	Allika Inkeri Moser	Estonia	21 July 2025	European Youth Olympic Festival	Skopje, North Macedonia	17 years, 116 days		
Long jump	6.91 m (+1.0 m/s)	Heike Drechsler	East Germany	9 August 1981		Jena, East Germany	16 years, 236 days		
Triple jump	14.57 m (+0.2 m/s)	Qiuyan Huang	China	19 October 1997	Chinese National Games	Shanghai, China	17 years, 287 days		
Shot put (3 kg)	20.52 m	Corrie de Bruin	Netherlands	13 June 1993		Assen, Netherlands	16 years, 230 days		
Shot put (4 kg)	19.08 m	Ilke Wyludda	East Germany	9 August 1986		Karl-Marx-Stadt, East Germany	17 years, 134 days		
Discus throw	65.86 m	Ilke Wyludda	East Germany	1 August 1986		Neubrandenburg, East Germany	17 years, 126 days		
Hammer throw (3 kg)	76.04 m	Réka Gyurátz	Hungary	23 June 2013		Zalaegerszeg, Hungary	17 years, 23 days		
Hammer throw (4 kg)	70.60 m	Wenxiu Zhang	China	5 April 2003		Nanning, China	17 years, 14 days		
Javelin throw (500 g)	70.10 m	Adriana Vilagoš	Serbia	14 August 2021	Balkan Youth Championships	Kraljevo, Serbia	17 years, 224 days		
Javelin throw (600 g)	64.28 m	Ziyi Yan	China	14 April 2024	Chinese Athletics Grand Prix 2	Hangzhou, China	15 years, 328 days		
Heptathlon (youth)	6301 pts	Henriette Jæger	Norway	12–13 September 2020		Moss, Norway	17 years, 92 days		
Heptathlon (youth)	100m H (wind) / High jump / Shot put / 200m (wind) / Long jump (wind) / Javelin / 800m; 13.21 (+2.7 m/s) / 1.69 m / 14.69 m / 23.36 (+2.1 m/s) / 6.33 m (−1.3 m/s) / 35.71 m / 2:11.37								
Heptathlon (senior)	6293 pts	Jana Koščak	Croatia	27–28 May 2023	Hypo-Meeting	Götzis, Austria	17 years, 9 days		
Heptathlon (senior)	100m H (wind) / High jump / Shot put / 200m (wind) / Long jump (wind) / Javelin / 800m; 13.26 (+1.2 m/s) / 1.92 m / 12.42 m / 24.14 (+0.9 m/s) / 6.24 m (+1.3 m/s) / 41.03 m / 2:21.20								
3000 m walk (track)	12:22.2 h	Qin Aihua	China	4 September 2004		Yenking, China	16 years, 306 days		
5000 m walk (track)	20:28.05	Tatyana Kalmykova	Russia	12 July 2007	World Youth Championships	Ostrava, Czech Republic	17 years, 183 days		
5 km walk (road)	20:27	Tatyana Kozlova	Russia	28 May 2000		Saransk, Russia	16 years, 269 days		
10,000 m walk (track)	42:56.09	Gao Hongmiao	China	27 September 1991		Tangshan, China	17 years, 194 days		
10 km walk (road)	43:15	Li Hong	China	10 March 1996		Zhuhai, China	16 years, 283 days		
20,000 m walk (track)	1:34:21.56	Wang Xue	China	1 November 2007		Wuhan, China	17 years, 260 days		
20 km walk (road)	1:29:24	Anastasiya Kolchina	Russia	11 September 2022		Kostroma, Russia	17 years, 123 days		
50,000 m walk (track)	5:05:44.7 h	Tatyana Abramzeva	Russia	12 October 2003		Saint Petersburg, Russia			
4 × 100 m relay	44.05	Petra Koppetsch; Marlies Oelsner; Margit Sinzel; Christina Brehmer	East Germany	24 August 1975	European Junior Championships	Athens, Greece	17 years, 156 days 17 years, 177 days		
4 × 400 m relay	3:36.98	Janet Ravenscroft; Evelyn McMeekin; Ruth Kennedy; Sue Pettett	Great Britain	26 August 1973	European Junior Championships	Duisburg, Germany	16 years, 225 days 17 years, 215 days		
Swedish medley relay	2:03.42	Christania Williams; Shericka Jackson; Chrisann Gordon; Olivia James	Jamaica	10 July 2011	World Youth Championships	Lille, France	16 years, 266 days 16 years, 359 days 16 years, 295 days		

=== Mixed ===
Event	Record	Athlete	Nationality	Date	Meet	Place	Age	Ref.	Video
4 × 400 m relay	3:19.54	Keshun Reed; Lynna Irby; Norman Grimes; Samantha Watson	United States	19 July 2015	World Youth Championships	Cali, Colombia	17 years, 124 days 16 years, 225 days 17 years, 194 days 15 years, 251 days		

== Indoor ==
=== Boys ===
Event	Record	Athlete	Nationality	Date	Meet	Place	Age	Ref.
50 m	5.81	Jeremy Rankin	United States	11 March 2007		Landover, United States	16 years, 169 days	
55 m	6.12	Ronald Darby	United States	21 December 2011	Prince George's County Invitational	Landover, United States	17 years, 353 days	
60 m	6.59	Dillon Mitchell	United States	1 March 2026	USA Championships	Staten Island, United States	16 years, 87 days	
200 m	20.66	Jake Odey-Jordan	Great Britain	10 March 2024	New Balance Nationals Indoor	Boston, United States	16 years, 79 days	
300 m	32.87	Tyrese Cooper	United States	4 February 2017	Armory Track Invitational	New York City, United States	16 years, 320 days	
400 m	45.66	Quincy Wilson	United States	2 February 2025	New Balance Indoor Grand Prix	Boston, United States	17 years, 25 days	
500 m	1:01.27	Quincy Wilson	United States	12 January 2024	The VA Showcase	Lynchburg, United States	16 years, 4 days	
600 m	1:16.20	Quincy Wilson	United States	8 February 2025	Millrose Games	New York City, United States	17 years, 31 days	
800 m	1:44.03	Cooper Lutkenhaus	United States	14 February 2026	Sound Invite	Winston-Salem, United States	17 years, 57 days	
1000 m	2:24.89	David Fiegen	Luxembourg	4 February 2001		Stuttgart, Germany	16 years, 154 days	
1500 m	3:33.25+	Sam Ruthe	New Zealand	31 January 2026	BU John Thomas Terrier Classic	Boston, United States	16 years, 294 days	
Mile	3:48.88	Sam Ruthe	New Zealand	31 January 2026	BU John Thomas Terrier Classic	Boston, United States	16 years, 294 days	
2000 m	4:57.74	Yomif Kejelcha	Ethiopia	28 February 2014	Meeting National en salle de Metz	Metz, France	16 years, 211 days	
3000 m	7:38.04	Brian Musau	Kenya	2 December 2023	Boston University Sharon Colyear-Danville Season Opener	Boston, United States	16 years, 338 days	
5000 m	13:59.96	Daniel Simmons	United States	11 March 2023	New Balance Nationals Indoor	Boston, United States	17 years, 39 days	
50 m hurdles (91.4 cm)	6.66	Stéphane Caristan	France	25 January 1981		Paris, France	16 years, 239 days	
50 m hurdles (99/100 cm)	6.69	Wayne Davis	United States	11 March 2007		Landover, United States	15 years, 201 days	
50 m hurdles (106.7 cm)	6.96	Garfield Darien	France	21 February 2004		Aubière, France	16 years, 61 days	
60 m hurdles (91.4 cm)	7.43	Jared Ejiasian	Nigeria	21 February 2026	French U18 Championships	Val-de-Reuil, France	16 years, 83 days	
60 m hurdles (99/100 cm)	7.62	Wayne Davis	United States	16 March 2008		Landover, United States	16 years, 207 days	
60 m hurdles (106.7 cm)	7.75	Yves N'Dabian	France	5 December 1999		Eaubonne, France	16 years, 130 days	
High jump	2.24 m	Dmitry Kroyter	Israel	14 February 2010		Moscow, Russia	16 years, 361 days	
High jump	2.24 m	Danil Lysenko	Russia	6 December 2014	«The Climbing of Everest» meeting	Kineshma, Russia	17 years, 201 days	
Pole vault	5.60 m	Matvey Volkov	Russia/Belarus	12 February 2021	Orlen Cup	Łódź, Poland	16 years, 336 days	
Long jump	8.12 m	Viktor Kuznyetsov	Ukraine	20 December 2003		Brovary, Ukraine	17 years, 156 days	
Triple jump	16.34 m	Martin Lamou	France	27 February 2016	U20 Match Italy-France-Germany	Padua, Italy	16 years, 290 days	
Shot put (5 kg)	24.24 m	Konrad Bukowiecki	Poland	30 December 2014	Chasing the Record Meeting	Spała, Poland	17 years, 288 days	
Shot put (6 kg)	20.22 m	Konrad Bukowiecki	Poland	19 January 2014	Mityng Kontrolny PZLA	Spała, Poland	16 years, 308 days	
Shot put (7.26 kg)	18.49 m	Yuriy Belonog	Ukraine	7 December 1991		Kyiv, Ukraine	17 years, 273 days	
Heptathlon (youth)	5910 pts (Note: Set while Russia were suspended by World Athletics)	Ranel Shafikov	Russia	22–23 December 2021		Kemerovo, Russia	17 years, 207 days	
Heptathlon (youth)	60m / Long jump / Shot put / High jump / 60m H / Pole vault / 1000m; 6.79 / 7.10 m / 14.53 m / 1.91 m / 7.75 / 5.00 m / 2:59.01							
Heptathlon (junior)	5371 pts	Maxime Moitie-Charnois	France	11–12 December 2021	Championnats Départementaux d’Épreuves Combinées	Miramas, France	17 years, 241 days	
Heptathlon (junior)	60m / Long jump / Shot put / High jump / 60m H / Pole vault / 1000m; 7.17 / 6.73 m / 12.98 m / 1.95 m / 8.21 / 4.35 m / 2:53.65							
Heptathlon (junior)	5510 pts (Note: Order of high jump and pole vault events switched)	Sam Talbot	Great Britain	9–10 January 2016	England Senior Open & U20 Combined Events Championships	Sheffield, United Kingdom	16 years, 327 days	
Heptathlon (junior)	7.00 (60 m), 7.51 m (long jump), 12.62 m (shot put), 3.82 m (pole vault) / 8.05 (60 m hurdles), 1.87 m (high jump), 2:44.60 (1000 m)							
Heptathlon (junior)	5592 pts h	Sven Reintak	Estonia	24–25 February 1980		Kharkiv, Soviet Union	16 years, 253 days	
Heptathlon (junior)	60m / Long jump / Shot put / High jump / 60m H / Pole vault / 1000m; 7.0 / 6.98 m / 13.79 m / 2.06 m / 8.2 / 4.80 m / 2:57.7							
Heptathlon (senior)	5483 pts	Wang Jianan	China	13–14 February 2012		Nanjing, China	15 years, 171 days	
Heptathlon (senior)	60m / Long jump / Shot put / High jump / 60m H / Pole vault / 1000m; 6.89 / 7.64 m / 9.27 m / 1.94 m / 8.46 / 4.80 m / 2:58.17							
3000 m walk	11:30.0 h	Damir Yangayev	Russia	1 March 1998		Insar, Russia	16 years, 344 days	
5000 m walk	19:30.08	Yevgeniy Shmalyuk	Russia	25 December 1993		Saint Petersburg, Russia	17 years, 345 days	
4 × 200 m relay	1:26.09	Long Beach Polytechnic High School; Isaiah Green; Vincent Joseph; Travon Patterson; Bryshon Nellum	United States	13 March 2005	National Scholastic Indoor Championships	New York City, United States	15 years, 215 days 17 years, 52 days 16 years, 174 days 15 years, 316 days	
4 × 400 m relay	3:23.04	Zebulon B. Vance TC, Charlotte; Lamar Johnson; Erin Jenkins; Cameron Tate; Jarrett Samuels	United States	14 March 2010	Nike Indoor Nationals	Boston, United States		

=== Girls ===
Event	Record	Athlete	Nationality	Date	Meet	Place	Age	Ref.
50 m	6.28	Victoria Jordan	United States	11 March 2007		Landover, Maryland, United States	17 years, 13 days	
55 m	6.68 A	Aleisha Latimer	United States	19 January 1996		Boulder, United States	16 years, 291 days	
60 m	7.13	Lisa Raye	Trinidad and Tobago	8 February 2025	Millrose Games	New York City, United States	17 years, 20 days	
200 m	22.33	Adaejah Hodge	British Virgin Islands	12 March 2023	New Balance Nationals	Boston, United States	16 years, 364 days	
300 m	37.38	Kayla Davis	United States	18 January 2020	The VA Showcase	Lynchburg, United States	16 years, 28 days	
400 m	51.84	Sydney McLaughlin	United States	13 March 2016	New Balance Nationals Indoor	New York City, United States	16 years, 219 days	
500 m	1:11.44	Devon Williams	United States	26 December 2004	MAC Holiday Classic	New York City, United States	15 years, 211 days	
600 m	1:23.57	Athing Mu	United States	24 February 2019	USA Track & Field Indoor Championships	New York City, United States	16 years, 261 days	
800 m	2:00.58	Sophia Gorriaran	United States	11 February 2022	BU David Hemery Valentine Invitational	Boston, United States	16 years, 236 days	
1000 m	2:41.53	Roisin Willis	United States	20 February 2021	CYUP Misfits Invitational	Chicago, United States	16 years, 198 days	
1500 m	4:01.92	Haregeweyn Kalayu	Ethiopia	3 February 2026	Czech Indoor Gala	Ostrava, Czech Republic	17 years, 33 days	
Mile	4:24.23	Saron Berhe	Ethiopia	30 January 2024	Czech Indoor Gala	Ostrava, Czech Republic	16 years, 156 days	
2000 m	6:08.9 h	Daniela Fetcere	Latvia	27 January 2006		Riga, Latvia	15 years, 152 days	
3000 m	8:39.80	Marta Alemayo	Ethiopia	25 January 2025	Astana Indoor Meeting	Astana, Kazhakstan	16 years, 292 days	
Two miles	9:38.68	Mary Cain	United States	2 February 2013	New Balance Indoor Grand Prix	Boston, United States	16 years, 275 days	
5000 m	15:37.12	Katelyn Tuohy	United States	20 January 2018	Virginia Showcase	Lynchburg, United States	15 years, 308 days	
50 m hurdles (84 cm)	6.95	Candy Young	United States	3 February 1979		Edmonton, Alberta, Canada	16 years, 258 days	
60 m hurdles (76.2 cm)	8.05	Alessia Succo	Italy	15 February 2026	Italian U18 Championships	Ancona, Italy	17 years, 8 days	
60 m hurdles (84 cm)	8.05	Grace Stark	United States	11 March 2018	New Balance Nationals Indoor	New York City, United States	16 years, 309 days	
High jump	1.96 m	Yaroslava Mahuchikh	Ukraine	22 December 2018		Minsk, Belarus	17 years, 94 days	
Pole vault	4.50 m	Amanda Moll	United States	27 February 2022	USA Championships	Spokane, United States	17 years, 27 days	
Long jump	6.61 m	Anu Kaljurand	Estonia	1 February 1986		Leningrad, Soviet Union	16 years, 291 days	
Triple jump	14.09 m	Wang Rong	China	7 March 2013	National Indoor Grand Prix	Nanjing, China	16 years, 249 days	
Shot put (3 kg)	19.40 m	Emel Dereli	Turkey	15 December 2012		İzmir, Turkey	16 years, 294 days	
Shot put (4 kg)	17.58 m	Emel Dereli	Turkey	28 December 2013	Salon Rekor Deneme Yarışları	Istanbul, Turkey	17 years, 306 days	
Pentathlon (Youth)	4371 pts	María Vicente	Spain	10 March 2018	Spanish Indoor Championships	Antequera, Spain	16 years, 347 days	
Pentathlon (Youth)	60m H / High jump / Shot put / Long jump / 800m; 8.33 / 1.75 m / 13.06 m / 6.11 m / 2:22.77							
3000 m walk (track)	12:05.6 h	Lyudmila Yefimkina	Russia	1 March 1998		Insar, Russia	16 years, 191 days	
4 × 200 m relay	1:38.77	SC Berlin; Anja Schmitz; Nadja Hack; Carola Otto; Silke Breckenfelder	Germany	17 February 1991		Dortmund, Germany		
4 × 200 m relay	1:38.77	Belgium Scholier; Imke Vervaet; Justien Grillet; Camille Laus; Kimberley Efonye	Belgium	20 February 2010	ADMB-Jeugdaflossingsmeeting	Ghent, Belgium	16 years, 315 days 16 years, 273 days	
4 × 400 m relay	3:46.31	Motor City TC; Johnyce Powell; Carlita Taylor; Jayla Fleming; Anna Jefferson	United States	16 March 2014	New Balance Nationals Indoor	New York City, United States	17 years, 74 days 15 years, 74 days 17 years, 74 days 16 years, 74 days	

== See also ==
- IAAF World Youth Championships in Athletics
- Youth (athletics)

== Notes ==
1. Though sometimes called "world youth records", they are not officially recognized or ratified as such by any body. World Athletics refers to them as World Youth Bests (WYB) or World Youth Best Performances instead.
