= 2024 World Athletics U20 Championships – Women's 3000 metres =

Women's 3000 metres at the 2024 World Athletics U20 Championships
- Venue: Estadio Atlético de la VIDENA
- Dates: 29 August 2024 (heats); 30 August 2024 (final)
- Competitors: 28 from 21 nations
- Winning time: 8:50.32

Medalists
| gold medal | Aleshign Baweke | Ethiopia |
| silver medal | Marion Jepngetich | Kenya |
| bronze medal | Marta Alemayo | Ethiopia |

The women's 3000 metres at the 2024 World Athletics U20 Championships was held at the Estadio Atlético de la VIDENA in Lima, Peru on 29 and 30 August 2024.

== Records ==
U20 standing records prior to the 2024 World Athletics U20 Championships were as follows:

| Record | Athlete & Nationality | Mark | Location | Date |
|---|---|---|---|---|
| World U20 Record | Zola Pieterse (GBR) | 8:28.83 | Rome, Italy | 7 September 1985 |
| Championship Record | Beyenu Degefa (ETH) | 8:41.76 | Bydgoszcz, Poland | 20 July 2016 |
| World U20 Leading | Senayet Getachew (ETH) | 8:32.49 | Boston, United States | 4 February 2024 |

== Results ==
=== Heats ===
The first 8 athletes in each heat (Q) qualified to the final.

==== Heat 1 ====
| Rank | Athlete | Nation | Time | Notes |
|---|---|---|---|---|
| 1 | Mercy Chepkemoi | Kenya | 9:22.72 | Q |
| 2 | Aleshign Baweke | Ethiopia | 9:22.77 | Q |
| 3 | Bentalin Yeko | Uganda | 9:22.81 | Q, PB |
| 4 | Innes FitzGerald | Great Britain | 9:24.14 | Q |
| 5 | Miu Suzuki | Japan | 9:26.77 | Q |
| 6 | Loes Kempe | Netherlands | 9:27.58 | Q |
| 7 | Mariá Viciosa | Spain | 9:28.02 | Q |
| 8 | Zuzanna Wiernicka | Poland | 9:30.29 | Q |
| 9 | Jade Le Corre | France | 9:32.14 | |
| 10 | Ayala Harris | Israel | 9:35.30 | |
| 11 | Li-mari Dekker | South Africa | 9:36.12 | |
| 12 | Sarah Köcher | Germany | 9:46.56 | |
| 13 | Katie Clute | United States | 9:48.28 | |
| 14 | Lilian Mateo | Bolivia | 10:14.08 | |

==== Heat 2 ====
| Rank | Athlete | Nation | Time | Notes |
|---|---|---|---|---|
| 1 | Marion Jepngetich | Kenya | 8:52.25 | Q, PB |
| 2 | Marta Alemayo | Ethiopia | 8:52.57 | Q |
| 3 | Keziah Chebet | Uganda | 9:03.23 | Q, PB |
| 4 | Fleur Templier | France | 9:11.97 | Q, NU20R |
| 5 | Vanessa Mikitenko | Germany | 9:13.94 | Q |
| 6 | Jess Bailey | Great Britain | 9:14.59 | Q |
| 7 | Sofia Thøgersen | Denmark | 9:14.83 | Q |
| 8 | Saima Murić | Serbia | 9:17.52 | Q, PB |
| 9 | Alexandra Hudea (Note: Alexandra Hudea did not originally qualify for the final however due to Vanessa Mikitenko opting to take no further part in the competition Hudea took her place.) | Romania | 9:27.36 | PB |
| 10 | Miyu Yamada | Japan | 9:38.38 | |
| 11 | Gabrielle Schmidt | Australia | 9:41.76 | |
| 12 | Elsa Sundqvist | Sweden | 9:42.60 | |
| 13 | Luz Arias | Peru | 9:48.71 | PB |
| – | Andrea Nygård Vie | Norway | DNF | |

=== Final ===
| Rank | Athlete | Nation | Time | Notes |
|---|---|---|---|---|
| 1st place, gold medalist(s) | Aleshign Baweke | Ethiopia | 8:50.32 | |
| 2nd place, silver medalist(s) | Marion Jepngetich | Kenya | 8:52.37 | |
| 3rd place, bronze medalist(s) | Marta Alemayo | Ethiopia | 8:53.64 | |
| 4 | Innes FitzGerald | Great Britain | 8:57.01 | PB |
| 5 | Sofia Thøgersen | Denmark | 8:59.85 | |
| 6 | Keziah Chebet | Uganda | 9:03.56 | |
| 7 | Bentalin Yeko | Uganda | 9:06.55 | PB |
| 8 | Jess Bailey | Great Britain | 9:06.92 | PB |
| 9 | Mercy Chepkemoi | Kenya | 9:10.54 | PB |
| 10 | Saima Murić | Serbia | 9:13.21 | PB |
| 11 | Fleur Templier | France | 9:17.27 | |
| 12 | Zuzanna Wiernicka | Poland | 9:25.35 | |
| 13 | Alexandra Hudea | Romania | 9:28.21 | |
| 14 | Loes Kempe | Netherlands | 9:32.59 | |
| 15 | Miu Suzuki | Japan | 9:41.15 | |
| 16 | Mariá Viciosa | Spain | 9:49.64 | |
