= Vincent Kibet Langat =

Kenyan long-distance runner

Personal information
- Born: 6 February 2001 (age 25)

Sport
- Country: Kenya
- Sport: Long-distance running
- Event: Half Marathon

Achievements and titles
- Personal best: Half Marathon: 58:24 (Copenhagen 2025)

Vincent Kibet Langat (born 6 February 2001) is a Kenyan long-distance runner.

== Career ==
In 2024, he was champion at the 2024 African Cross Country Championships in the 10K distance. He also won two 10K ABSA Run Your City races in Gqeberha and Cape Town.

In 2025, he placed 3rd at the 10K Valencia and followed it up by winning the Santa Pola International Half Marathon. He then placed 3rd in the World 10K Bengaluru and the Asics Tokyo Speed Race and then later won silver in the Copenhagen Half Marathon running it in 58:24.
