= 2024 World Athletics U20 Championships – Women's 5000 metres =

Women's 5000 metres at the 2024 World Athletics U20 Championships
- Venue: Estadio Atlético de la VIDENA
- Dates: 27 August 2024 (final)
- Competitors: 18 from 13 nations
- Winning time: 14:57.44

Medalists
gold medal	Mekedes Alemeshete	Ethiopia
silver medal	Charity Cherop	Uganda
bronze medal	Mercy Chepkemoi	Kenya

The women's 5000 metres at the 2024 World Athletics U20 Championships was held at the Estadio Atlético de la VIDENA in Lima, Peru on 27 August 2024.

== Records ==
U20 standing records prior to the 2024 World Athletics U20 Championships were as follows:

Record	Athlete & Nationality	Mark	Location	Date
World U20 Record	Tirunesh Dibaba (ETH)	14:30.88	Eugene, United States	11 June 2004
Championship Record	Genzebe Dibaba (ETH)	15:08.06	Moncton, Canada	21 July 2010
World U20 Leading	Mekedes Alemeshete (ETH)	14:36.70	Suzhou, China	27 April 2024

*Mark pending ratification

== Results ==
The final was scheduled to start at 17:55.

Rank	Athlete	Nation	Time	Notes
1st place, gold medalist(s)	Mekedes Alemeshete	Ethiopia	14:57.44	CR
2nd place, silver medalist(s)	Charity Cherop	Uganda	15:25.02	PB
3rd place, bronze medalist(s)	Mercy Chepkemoi	Kenya	15:33.29	PB
4	Sheila Jebet	Kenya	15:51.93	
5	Yuumi Yamamoto	Japan	16:01.54	
6	Gabrielle Schmidt	Australia	16:10.87	PB
7	Emily Junginger	Germany	16:14.34	
8	Laura Ribigini	Italy	16:16.96	PB
9	Arianne Olson	United States	16:19.23	
10	Lecia Arnoldo	Italy	16:20.21	PB
11	Lizzie Wellsted	Great Britain	16:21.50	
12	Li Yuan	China	16:29.32	
13	Caroline Dennilauler	France	16:35.43	
14	Franziska Drexler	Germany	16:38.58	
15	Catherine Lund	New Zealand	16:39.84	PB
16	Luz Arias	Peru	16:57.89	PB
17	Zariel Macchia	United States	17:12.33	
–	Elsa Sundqvist	Sweden	DNS	
DSQ	Medina Eisa	Ethiopia	~~14:39.71~~	DQ
