= Esther Chebet =

Ugandan middle-distance runner

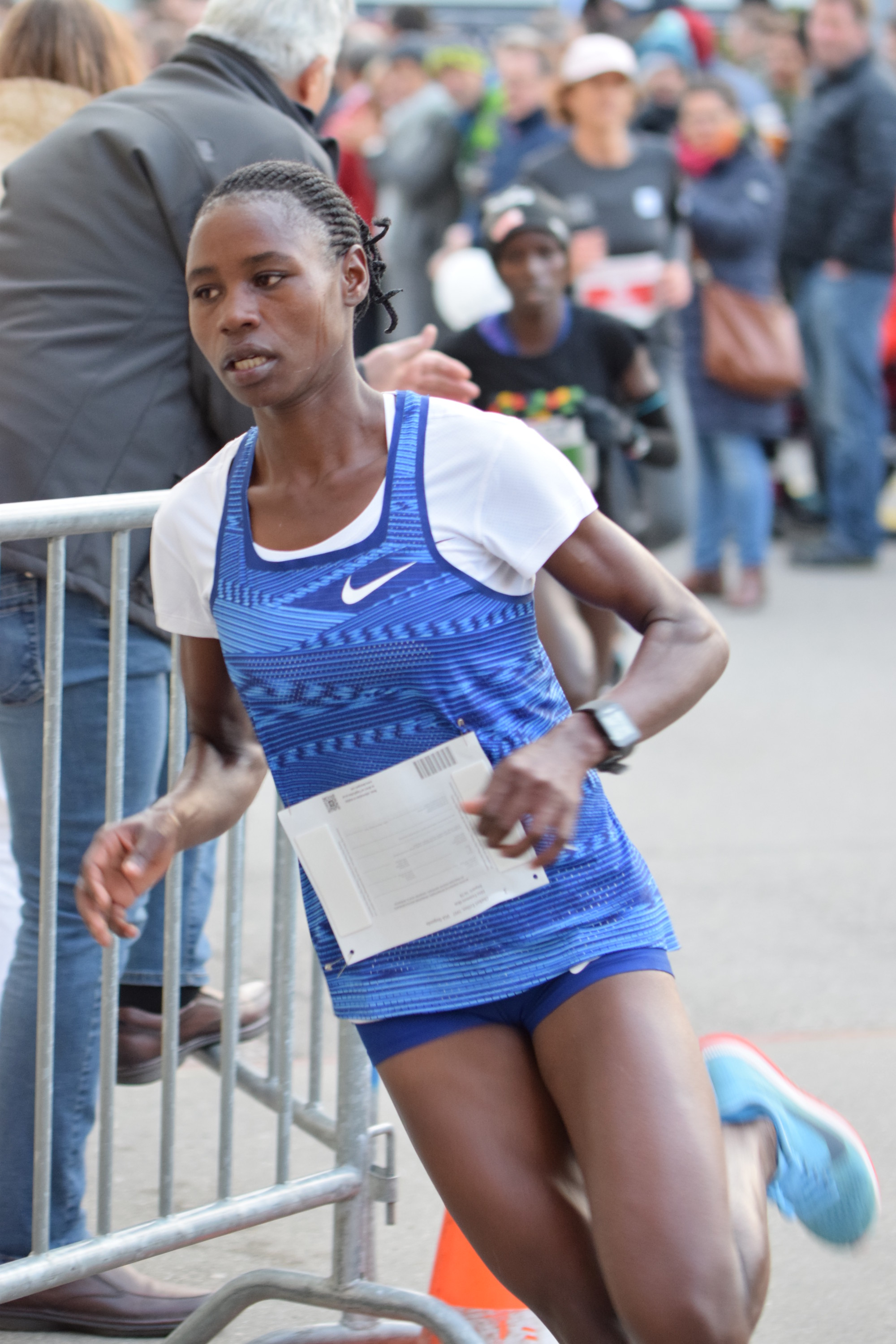
- Chebet in 2019

Personal information
- Nationality: Ugandan
- Born: 9 October 1997 (age 28)

Sport
- Sport: Middle-distance running
- Event: 1500 metres

Achievements and titles
- Personal bests: 800 meters: 2:03.28 (2016) 1500 meters: 4:02.90 (2019); Mile: 4:28.16 (2017); 5000 meters: 15:02.15 (2022) 10K: 31:53 (2018)
Medal record
Women's athletics
Representing Uganda
African Championships
Bronze medal – third place	2024 Douala	1500 m

Esther Chebet (born 9 October 1997) is a Ugandan middle-distance runner. She finished fifth in the 1500 metres at the 2019 African Games. At the 2019 World Cross Country Championships held in Aarhus, Denmark, she finished fourteenth in the senior race and won a bronze medal in the team competition.

She also competed in the 800 metres at the 2016 World U20 Championships, the 1500 metres at the 2017 World Championships, and again in the 1500 metres at the 2019 World Championships, though she did not advance to the finals.

Her personal best times are 2:03.28 minutes in the 800 metres which she achieved in July 2016 in Kampala, 4:02.90 minutes in the 1500 metres, achieved in May 2019 in Nanjing, and 4:28.16 minutes in the mile run which she achieved in July 2017 in Lausanne.

In June 2021, she qualified to represent Uganda at the 2020 Summer Olympics.
