= Athletics at the 2026 Summer Youth Olympics – Women's 3000 metres =

Athletics event at the 2026 Summer Youth Olympics

Women's 3000 metres at the IV Summer Youth Olympic Games
- Venue: Complexe Iba Mar Diop
- Date: 9 November 2026
- Competitors: 9 from 9 nations
- Winning time: 9:15.47

Medalists
1st place, gold medalist(s)		Faith Rono	Kenya
2nd place, silver medalist(s)		Yordanos Tsigab	Ethiopia
3rd place, bronze medalist(s)		Keren Chelimo	Uganda

The women's 3000 metres event at the 2026 Summer Youth Olympics was held on 9 November at the Complexe Iba Mar Diop in Dakar, Senegal. The event was contested as a single final.

== Schedule ==
The competition was held on 9 November, with the final scheduled for 15:03 local time (UTC).

Date	Time	Round
9 November 2026	15:03	Final

== Results ==
The 3000 metres competition consisted of a single final, in accordance with the official competition format.

=== Final ===
The final was held on 9 November 2026 at 15:03.

Rank	Bib	Athlete	Nation	Result	Remark
1st place, gold medalist(s)	199	Faith Rono	Kenya	9:15.47	
2nd place, silver medalist(s)	166	Yordanos Tsigab	Ethiopia	9:15.71	
3rd place, bronze medalist(s)	281	Keren Chelimo	Uganda	9:32.41	SB
4	107	Zoe Gorski	Argentina	9:47.83	
5	237	Maria Clara Pires	Portugal	10:06.41	
6	119	Zara Ilieva	Bulgaria	10:07.71	
7	216	Kenya Cuahutle Pérez	Mexico	10:22.21	
8	208	Matebatso Lelaka	Lesotho	10:28.46	PB
9	260	Salvina Jalisma	Solomon Islands	13:52.95	PB

The intermediate times were 3:20.40 at 1000 metres, recorded by Zara Ilieva, and 6:22.35 at 2000 metres, recorded by Faith Rono.
