= Shito Gumi =

Ethiopian track and field athlete (born 2007)

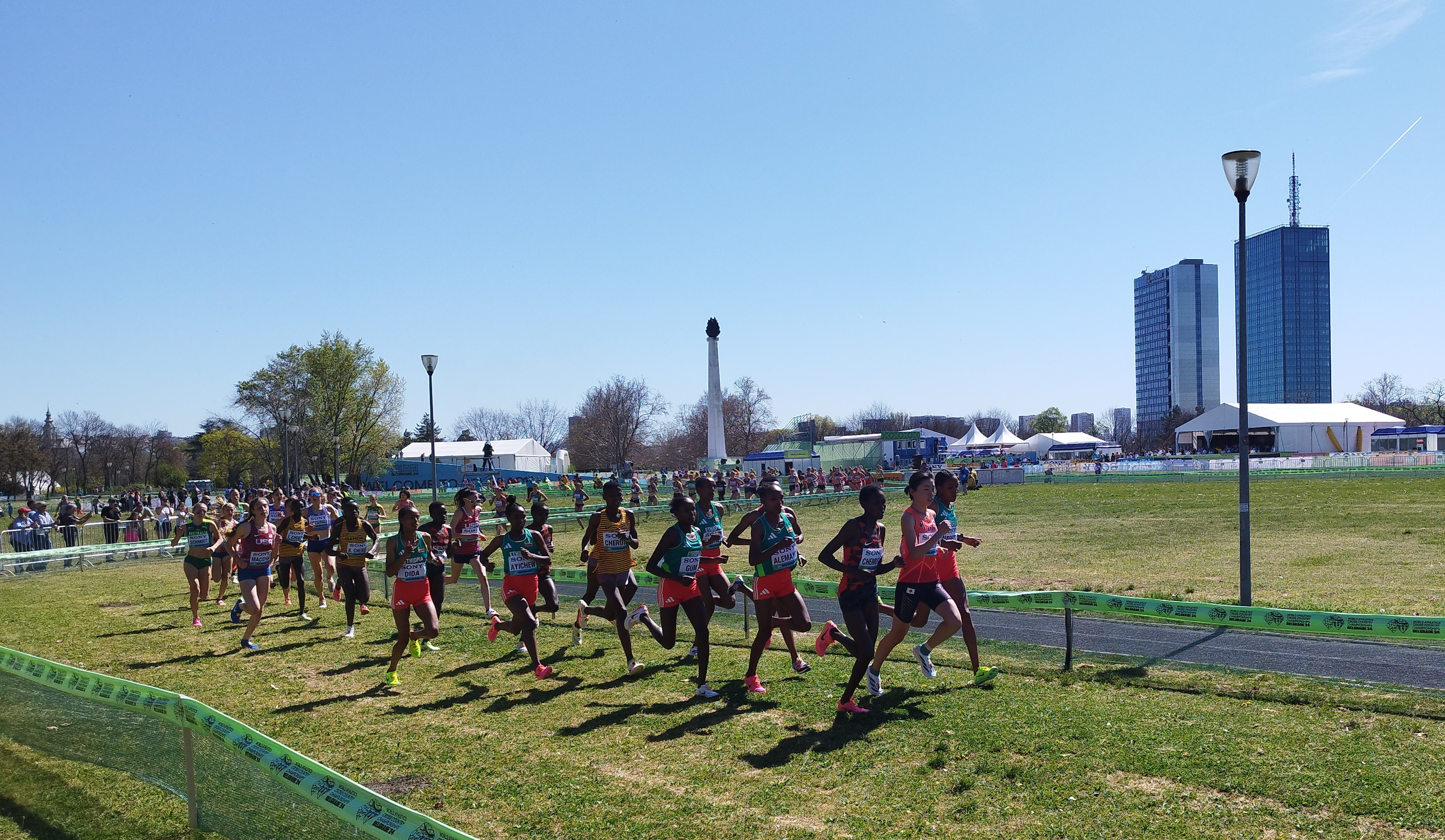
- Gumi at the 2024 World Athletics Cross Country Championships

Personal information
- Nationality: Ethiopian
- Born: 18 March 2007 (age 19)

Sport
- Country: Ethiopia
- Sport: Athletics
- Event: Long-distance running
Medal record
Women's athletics
Representing Ethiopia
World U20 Championships
| Silver medal – second place | 2026 Eugene | 3000 m |
| Silver medal – second place | 2026 Eugene | 5000 m |

Shito Gumi (born 18 March 2007) is an Ethiopian long-distance runner.

== Biography ==
She finished ninth in the U20 race at the 2024 World Athletics Cross Country Championships in Belgrade on 30 March 2024.

She finished runner-up in the 3000m in Astana on the 2025 World Athletics Indoor Tour to 16-year-old compatriot Marta Alemayo, who set a new world under-18 best to win the race on 25 January 2025. Gumi's time of 8:40.00 also came under the previous best of 8:46.01 set by Gotytom Gebreslase in 2012. She competed at the 2025 Meeting International Mohammed VI d'Athlétisme de Rabat, part of the 2025 Diamond League, in May 2025.

Gumi ran 8:41.18 for the 3000 metres indoors in February 2026. She won the silver medal over 5000 metres behind Charity Cherop of Uganda at the 2026 World Athletics U20 Championships, running 15:07:91. Later at the championships she won the silver medal ahead of Cherop in the women's 3000 metres, running a personal best 8:45.06.
