= Haregeweyni Kalayu =

Ethiopian middle-distance runner

Personal information
- Born: 29 May 2009 (age 17)

Sport
- Sport: Athletics
- Event: Middle-distance running

Achievements and titles
- Personal bests: 1500m: 3:59.28 (Rabat, 2026); Indoors; 1500m: 4:01.92 (Ostrava, 2026) AU18B

Haregeweyni Kalayu (born 29 May 2009) is an Ethiopia middle-distance runner. In 2026, she set an African under-18 indoor record in the 1500 metres.

== Biography ==
During the 2026 indoor season, Kalaya began to compete on the World Athletics Indoor Tour over 1500 metres. She ran an outright personal best of 4:01.92 for the 1500 metres competing at the Czech Indoors Gala in Ostrava, Czechia, on 3 February 2026, where she finished in third place behind compatriots Birke Haylom and Saron Berhe. She followed that three days later, with a fifth-place finish at the World Athletics Indoor Tour Hold meeting in Madrid over 1500 metres, running a time of 4:06.74 on 6 February. She also had a top-ten finish at the Meeting Hauts-de-France Pas-de-Calais Trophée EDF in Lievin, France on 19 February 2026 in the 1500 m. Later that month, she placed fourth in 4:03.75 at the 2026 Copernicus Cup in Toruń, behind Agathe Guillemot and compatriots Freweyni Hailu and Birke Haylom.

In March 2026, she was selected alongside Berhe and Haylom for the Ethiopian team to compete in the 1500 m at the 2026 World Athletics Indoor Championships in Kuyavian–Pomeranian, Poland. However, on the eve of the championships it was reported that she was one of a number of Ethiopian athletes, including Berhe and Tsige Duguma, who were unable to compete due to issues obtaining the requisite VISA. On 31 May, two days after her 17th birthday, she was second in 3:59.28 behind Hailu in the 1500 metres at the 2026 Meeting International Mohammed VI d'Athlétisme de Rabat in Morocco. 7 June, she had a top-four finish in the 1500 m at the 2026 Bauhausgalan in Stockholm and on 19 June, placed third in the 1500 metres with 4:03.56 at the 2026 Doha Diamond League. In September, she placed twelfth over 1500 m at the inaugural World Ultimate Championship in Budapest.
