= Marion Jepngetich =

Kenyan athlete (born 2005)

Personal information
- Born: 4 September 2005 (age 20)

Sport
- Sport: Athletics
- Event(s): Long distance running, Cross Country running

Achievements and titles
- Personal best(s): 1500m 4:15.04 (Tucson, 2025); 3000m 8:44.00 (Fayetteville, 2026); 5000m 15:13.01 (Eugene, 2026); Road; 5km 15:03 (Lille, 2024); 10km 33:03 (Brasov, 2024)
Medal record
Women's athletics
Representing Kenya
World U20 Championships
Silver medal – second place	2024 Lima	3000 m

Marion Jepngetich (born 4 September 2005) is a Kenyan long-distance and cross country runner. She was a silver medalist over 3000 metres at the 2024 World U20 Championships.

== Biography ==
In 2023, she was selected but missed the chance to compete in the under-20 women's race at the 2023 World Athletics Cross Country Championships in Bathurst, Australia, due to travel visa issues. She won the women's 5000 metres in 15:51.29 ahead of Diana Cherotich at Athletics Kenya track and field meet which doubled as trials for the Under-20 regional games.

Jepngetich won a silver medal in Lima, Peru at the 2024 World Athletics U20 Championships in the 3000 metres, in August 2024, having led for much of the final before she was passed in the final 200 metres by Aleshign Baweke of Ethiopia.

In January 2025, she began competing for the University of New Mexico, in the United States. That summer, she had two second-place finishes in the 1500 metres and 5000 metres at the Mountain West Outdoor Track and Field Championships, before finishing fourth overall in the 5000 metres final at the 2025 NCAA Division I Outdoor Track and Field Championships in Eugene, Oregon in June 2025. In August 2025, she signed an NIL deal with Swiss sportswear brand On.

In October 2025, she won the team cross country title with New Mexico at the Mountain West Conference Championships, placing fifth in the individual race. She had a top-ten finish at the NCAA Division I Mountain Cross Country Regional championships in Salt Lake City, winning the team title with New Mexico. On 14 March 2026, she placed third at the 2026 NCAA Indoor Championships in the 3000 metres, running a personal best 8:44.00. Competing at the 2026 NCAA Outdoor Championships, she was second across the line in the 5000 metres running 15:13.01, but race winner Doris Lemngole was later disqualified for stepping off the track, with the win awarded to Jepngetich.
