= Yordanos Tsigab =

Ethiopian athlete (born 2009)

Personal information
- Nationality: Ethiopian
- Born: 21 March 2009 (age 17)

Sport
- Sport: Athletics
- Event: Middle-distance running
Medal record
Women's athletics
Representing Ethiopia
Youth Olympic Games
Silver medal – second place	2026 Dakar	3000 m
World U20 Championships
Gold medal – first place	2026 Eugene	3000 m

Yordanos Tsigab (born 21 March 2009) is an Ethiopian middle-distance runner. She won a gold medal in the 3000 metres at the 2026 World Athletics U20 Championships.

== Career ==
In August 2026, Yordanos Tsigab competed at the 2026 World Athletics U20 Championships and won a gold medal in the 3000 metres with a personal best time of 8:43.65.
