= Dida cidaria =

Scientific classification
- Domain: Eukaryota
- Kingdom: Animalia
- Phylum: Arthropoda
- Class: Insecta
- Order: Lepidoptera
- Superfamily: Noctuoidea
- Family: Erebidae
- Subfamily: Hypeninae
- Genus: Dida; H. Druce, 1891
- Species: D. cidaria

Binomial name
- Dida cidaria H. Druce, 1891

Species of moth

Dida cidaria is the only species in the monotypic moth genus Dida of the family Erebidae. It is known to be found in Mexico. Both the genus and the species were first described by Herbert Druce in 1891.
