= Yenawa Nbret =

Ethiopian track and field athlete (born 2007)

Personal information
- Nationality: Ethiopian
- Born: 18 May 2007 (age 19)

Sport
- Country: Ethiopia
- Sport: Athletics
- Event: Long-distance running
Medal record
Women's athletics
Representing Ethiopia
African Championships
Silver medal – second place	2023 Ndola	3000m
World Cross Country Championships
Gold medal – first place	2024 Belgrade	Junior team

Yenawa Nbret (born 18 May 2007) is an Ethiopian long-distance runner. In 2024, she set a 10 km road under-18 world best.

== Biography ==
She was a silver medalist over 3000 metres at the 2023 African U20 Championships in Ndola, Zambia.

She finished sixth in the U20 race at the 2024 World Athletics Cross Country Championships in Belgrade on 30 March 2024, and as the fourth finishing Ethiopian woman won a gold medal in the U20 women's team race. Prior to the race, she had won Ethiopia's trials for Belgrade at the Jan Meda International Cross Country.

In May 2024, she competed at the Prefontaine Classic, part of the 2024 Diamond League, over 5000 metres. She finished seventh in September 2024 at the Trunsylvania 10 km road race at the Brasov Running Festival in a personal best time of 30:38, also an under-18 world best.

She ran a personal best 14:47.56 in the 5000 metres at the 2025 Xiamen Diamond League event in China, in April 2025. She won the 10,000 metres at the 2025 Bislett Games in Oslo on 11 June 2025. On 19 June 2026, she had a top-ten finish over 5000 metres at the 2026 Doha Diamond League.
