= Diana Cherotich =

Kenyan track and field athlete (born 2005)

Personal information
- Born: 24 December 2005 (age 20)

Sport
- Sport: Athletics
- Events: Long-distance running, Cross country running

Achievements and titles
- Personal bests: 3000m: 8:56.04 (Fukagawa, 2024); 5000m: 15:01.80 (Nobeoka, 2024); 10,000m: 31:45.22 (Palo Alto, 2025); Road; 5km: 15:06 (Lille, 2023)
Medal record
Women's athletics
Representing Kenya
World Cross Country Championships
Silver medal – second place	2024 Belgrade	U20 team

Diana Cherotich (born 24 December 2005) is a Kenyan long-distance and cross country runner. She competes in the United States for the Oregon Ducks track and field team.

== Biography ==
Cherotich is from Bungoma County, Kenya. She competed at the 2024 World Cross Country Championships in Belgrade, Serbia, where she finished fifth for Kenya in the U20 race, winning silver in the team event. This came after she missed the chance to compete the previous year at the Championships in Bathurst, Australia, due to VISA issues.

Cherotich joined the University of Oregon in the United States in March 2025. She made her race debut for the Oregon Ducks at the Stanford Invitational on 4 April 2025, where she set a new school record for the 10,000 metres, running 31:45.22 seconds for the win. The time was also the ninth-fastest in collegiate history, and was more than 21 seconds faster than the previous Oregon program record from 2013. She then won the women's 10,000-metres final at the Big Ten Outdoor Track & Field Championships at Hayward Field on 16 May, running a meeting record time of 32:00.48.

She won the individual and team title with Oregon at the Big Ten Conference cross country championships on 31 October 2025. She had a second-place finish at the NCAA West Regional cross country championships on 14 November 2025 at in Sacramento, California, helping the Oregon Ducks to a second-place finish. On 22 November 2025, she competed at the 2025 NCAA Cross Country Championships in Missouri, helping Oregon to a third-place finish.

In February 2026, she was part of an Oregon 1-2-3 over 5000 metres at the Big Ten Indoor Championships with teammates Şilan Ayyıldız and Juliet Cherubet. She placed tenth in the 5000 m in 15:32.32 on 13 March at the 2026 NCAA Indoor Championships.

In October 2026, Cherotich defended the title at the Bill Dellinger Invitational ahead of teammate Juliet Cherubet, becoming the first woman to win back-to-back titles. She also won the individual title and led Oregon to the team title at the 2026 Big Ten Cross Country Championships.
