= Chaltu Dida =

Ethiopian long-distance runner (born 2006)

Personal information
- Full name: Chaltu Dida Diriba
- Born: 5 December 2006 (age 19)

Sport
- Sport: Athletics
- Event: Long distance running

Achievements and titles
- Personal bests: 5000m: 14:27.11 (Rome, 2025); 10,000m: 30:33.86 (Oslo, 2025); Road; 5km: 14:51 (Al Khobar, 2024); 10km: 32:28 (Addis Abeba, 2024); Half marathon: 1:08:12 (Lisbon, 2025)

Chaltu Dida Diriba (born 5 December 2006) is an Ethiopian long-distance runner.

== Biography ==
Dida ran a personal best time of 14:27.11 to finish seventh in the 2025 Diamond League event in Rome, Italy; the 2025 Golden Gala, over 5000 metres on 6 June 2025. She ran a personal best time of 30:33.86 for the 10,000 metres to place third at the 2025 Bislett Games in Oslo, Norway, later that month. In July 2025, she was provisionally named in the Ethiopian team for the 5000 metres at the 2025 World Athletics Championships in Tokyo, Japan, but ultimately did not compete. She ran a personal best of 1:08:12 for the half marathon in Lisbon in October 2025.

Dida placed third at the 10K Facsa Castellón, a World Athletics Label road race, on 22 February 2026, running 29:50. She finished second to Agnes Ngetich in 30:02 at the Urban Trail de Lille in France, over 10 km. She won the Birell 10K Night Race in Prague on 5 September 2026, winning in 30:04.

== Personal life ==
She is the sister of runner Robe Dida.
