= Saron Berhe =

Ethiopian middle-distance runner (born 2007)

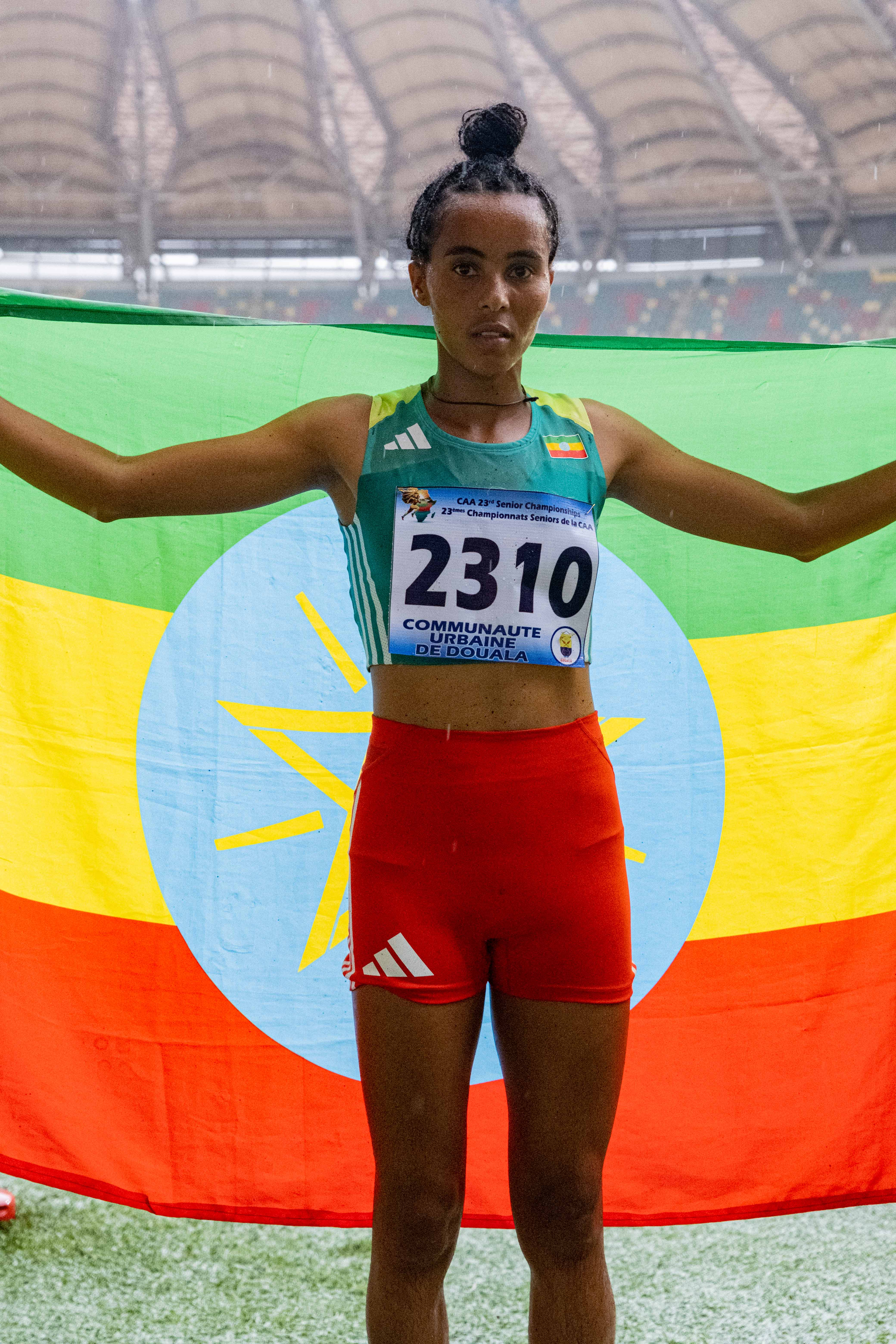

Personal information
- Full name: Saron Berhe Tareke
- Nationality: Ethiopia
- Born: 22 August 2007 (age 18) Kampala
- Agent: Juan Pedro Pineda De La Losa
- Height: 167 cm (5 ft 6 in)
- Weight: 50 kg (110 lb)

Sport
- Sport: Athletics
- Events: 1500 metres Mile run

Achievements and titles
- National finals: 2022 Ethiopian U18s; • 800m, 2nd (silver); 2022 Ethiopian Champs; • 800m, 8th
- Personal bests: 1500m: 4:00.46 (2023) Mile: 4:24.23 sh WU18R (2024)
Medal record
Women's athletics
Representing Ethiopia
African Championships
Gold medal – first place	2024 Douala	1500 m
World Junior Championships
Gold medal – first place	2024 Lima	1500 m
- Updated on 20 February 2024

Saron Berhe Tareke (born 22 August 2007) is an Ethiopian middle-distance runner. She is the world under-18 record-holder in the short track 1500 metres and mile run with a mile time of 4:24.23.

== Career ==
Saron started her career competing in the 800 metres, finishing 6th behind Werkuha Getachew at the 2021 Pepsi Meet in Addis Ababa. In 2022, she contested both the Ethiopian U18 Championships and the senior Ethiopian Athletics Championships in that event; she won the silver medal at the U18 championships in a 2:04.6 best, and finished 8th at the senior championships.

Running as a professional under Juan Pedro Pineda, Saron made her international debut placing 8th at the 2023 Metz Indoor Meeting. At the Meeting Desafio Nerja in Spain, she finished runner-up in a personal best of 2:02.26. Despite the 800 m time being a world under-18 lead, Saron would see her greatest success in the 1500 m, which she made her international debut for at the Meeting Pro Athlé Tour Stanislas de Nancy in France. She placed 2nd at the 2023 Meeting Madrid in a time of 4:02.30 behind Brenda Chebet, but Chebet was later disqualified for violating anti-doping rules, promoting Saron to first place. Saron placed 6th at the 2023 Xiamen Diamond League in 4:00.86, and 11th at the 2023 Memorial Van Damme in 4:00.46 to end her season. The latter result made her the fastest-ever woman to place 11th in any 1500 metres race.

Saron opened her 2024 season at the 2024 Copernicus Cup, running the short track mile run which was set up as a world record attempt for Freweyni Hailu. Saron joined Hailu, Hirut Meshesha, and Netsanet Desta behind the pacemakers, and despite falling back she finished 3rd in 4:24.23. The time was a new under-18 world best, beating Mary Cain's old record of 4:28.25 by four seconds. Her 1500 m en-route split was 4:06.62, which also beat Gudaf Tsegay's previous under-18 world best of 4:08.47.

== Personal life ==
Saron runs under Spanish athletics manager Juan Pedro Pineda, alongside Olympic medallist Gudaf Tsegay. Her twin sister Tegab Berhe is also a runner, having finished 6th at the 2023 African U18 Championships in the 800 m.

== Statistics ==
=== Personal best progression ===
1500m progression
#	Mark	Pl.	Competition	Venue	Date	Ref.
1	4:13.4 h A	1st place, gold medalist(s)	AF Club Competition	Addis Ababa, Ethiopia	24 Mar 2023	
2	4:03.70	5th	Meeting Pro Athlé Tour Stanislas de Nancy	Tomblaine, France	17 Jun 2023	
3	4:02.30	1st place, gold medalist(s)	Meeting Madrid	Madrid, Spain	21 Jul 2023	
4	4:00.86	6th	Xiamen Diamond League	Xiamen, China	1 Sep 2023	
5	4:00.46	11th	Memorial Van Damme	Bruxelles, Belgium	7 Sep 2023	
