= Robe Dida =

Ethiopian track and field athlete

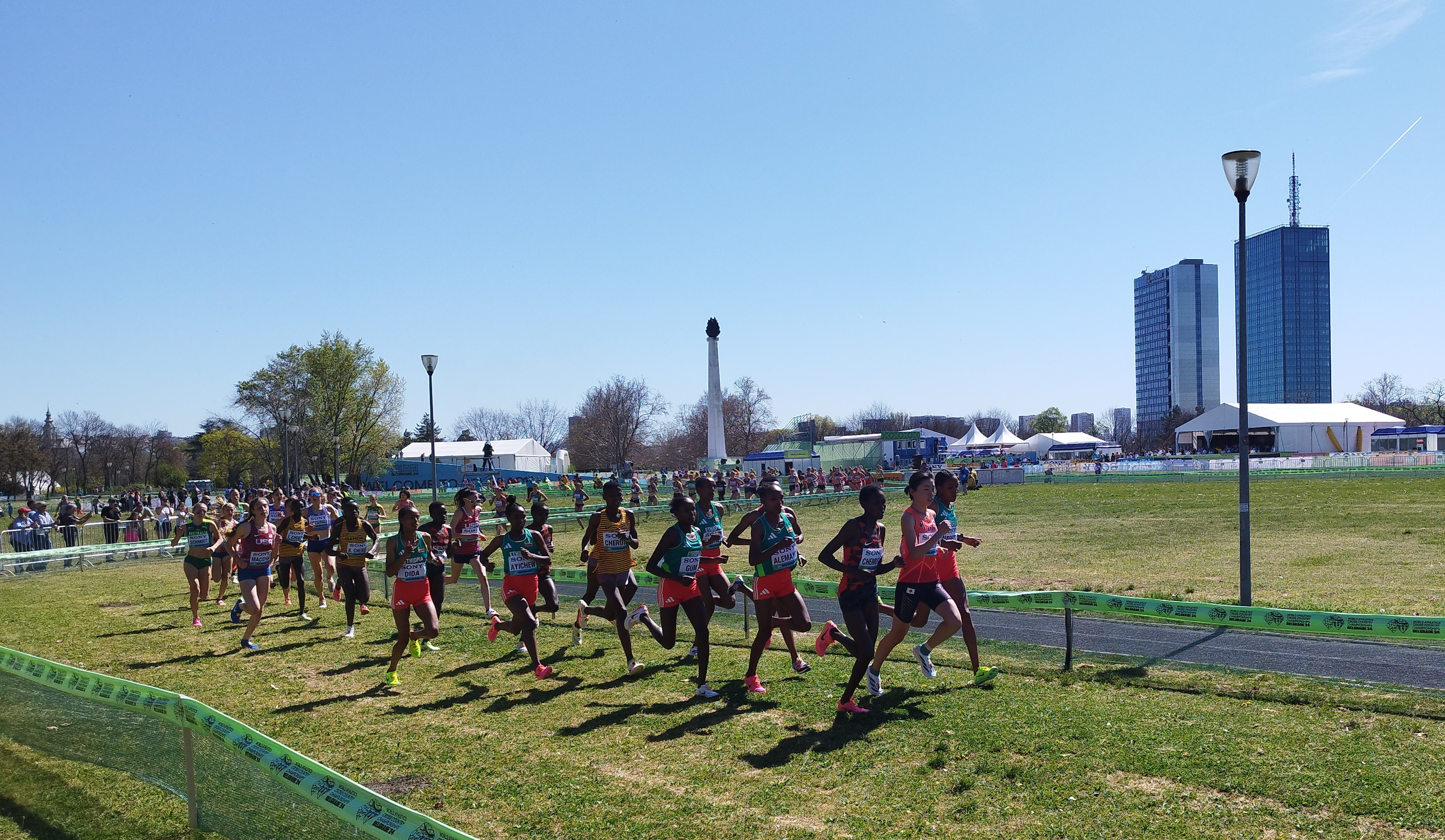
- Dida at the 2024 World Athletics Cross Country Championships

Personal information
- Nationality: Ethiopian
- Born: 29 December 2006 (age 19)

Sport
- Sport: Athletics
- Event: Long-distance running
Medal record
Women's athletics
Representing Ethiopia
World Cross Country Championships
| Gold medal – first place | 2024 Belgrade | Junior team |
| Bronze medal – third place | 2024 Belgrade | Junior race |

Robe Dida (born 29 December 2006) is an Ethiopian long-distance runner.

== Career ==
In February 2024, she won the U20 title at the 2024 African Cross Country Championships.

In March 2024, she won bronze in the U20 individual and gold in the team U20 race at the 2024 World Athletics Cross Country Championships in Serbia.

== Personal life ==
She is the sister of runners Gemechu Dida and Chaltu Dida.
