= Charity Cherop =

Ethiopian long-distance runner (born 2007)

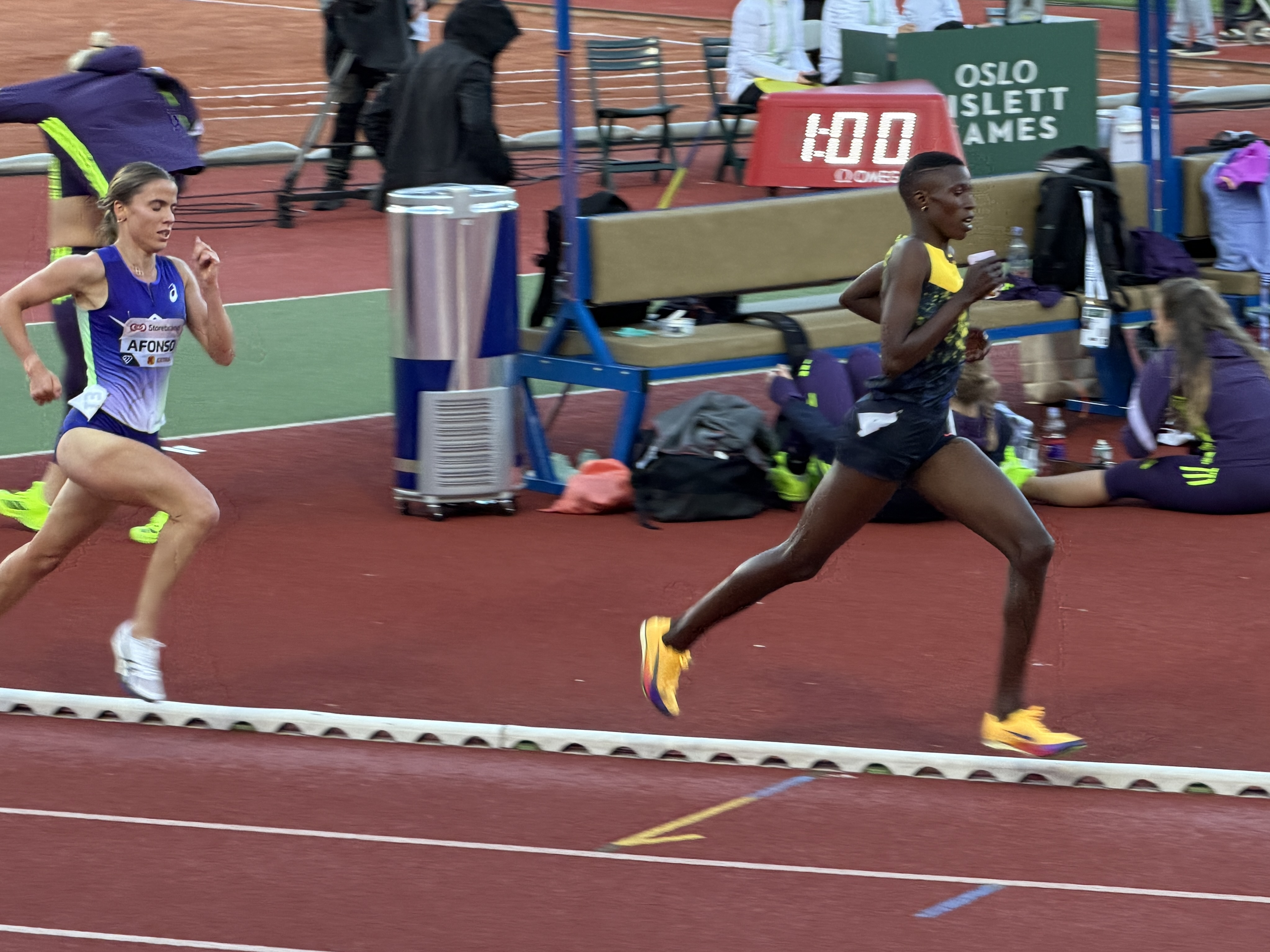
- Cherop at the 2026 Bislett Games

Personal information
- Born: 4 July 2007 (age 19)

Sport
- Sport: Athletics
- Events: Long distance running, Cross country running

Achievements and titles
- Personal bests: 3000 m: 8:39.22 NU20R; 5000 m: 14:39.38 NR
Medal record
Women's athletics
Representing Uganda
World U20 Championships
Gold medal – first place	2026 Eugene	5000 m
Silver medal – second place	2024 Lima	5000 m
Bronze medal – third place	2026 Eugene	3000 m
Islamic Solidarity Games
Silver medal – second place	2025 Riyadh	5000 m
African U20 Championships
Gold medal – first place	2025 Abeokuta	5000m
World Cross Country Championships
Gold medal – first place	2026 Tallahassee	U20 team
Bronze medal – third place	2026 Tallahassee	U20 race

Charity Cherop (born 4 July 2007) is an Ugandan long-distance and cross country runner. In May 2026, she set a Ugandan national record in the 5000 m.

== Biography ==
=== 2023 ===
Cherop placed thirteenth in the individual competition as she competed for Uganda in the U20 race at the 2023 World Athletics Cross Country Championships in Bathurst, Australia, as the Ugandan women's U20 team placed fourth overall.

=== 2024 ===
She won the silver medal in the 5000 metres at the 2024 World Athletics U20 Championships in Lima, Peru with a personal best 15:25.02 (originally finished third behind Medina Eisa, but Eisa was later given a two-year ban for age falsification violations and stripped of her gold medal).

She travelled to Europe for the 2024–25 World Athletics Cross Country Tour and won the Cardiff Cross Challenge in November 2024, her first World Athletics Cross Country Tour Gold race win. That month, she finished third at the Cross Internacional de Itálica behind Beatrice Chebet.

=== 2025 ===
She placed third in the World Cross Country Tour Gold event in Hannut, Belgium, in January 2025.

In July, Cherop broke the championship record in the 5000m as she ran 15:10.88 to lead a Ugandan 1-2 alongside Risper Cherop, at the 2025 African U20 Championships in Abeokuta, Nigeria. She set a new Ugandan under-20 national record at the 2025 Kamila Skolimowska Memorial, part of the 2025 Diamond League, in Poland, with a run of 8:49.96 for the 3000 metres.

Cherop was a silver medalist behind Winfred Yavi at the 2025 Islamic Solidarity Games over 5000 metres.

=== 2026 ===
In January 2026, she competed in the Uganda U20 team at the 2026 World Athletics Cross Country Championships in Tallahassee, winning the gold medal in the team race and the bronze medal in the women’s individual race. Later in January 2026, she placed third at the Lotto Cross Cup de Hannut.

In May, she ran a Ugandan national record 14:39.38 for the 5000 m at the 2026 Shanghai Diamond League. In June, she ran a personal best 8:39.22 for the 3000 metres at the 2026 Bislett Games. She won the gold medal for her country over 5000 metres at the 2026 World Athletics U20 Championships, running 15:03.88. Later at the championships she won the bronze medal in the 3000 metres finishing behind Shito Gumi of Ethiopia who also won medals in both distance events. In November, Cherop was runner-up at the Cross Internacional de Itálica in Seville before winning the Cross Internacional de Soria the following weekend.
