= Bujar Dida =

Albanian chemist, diplomat

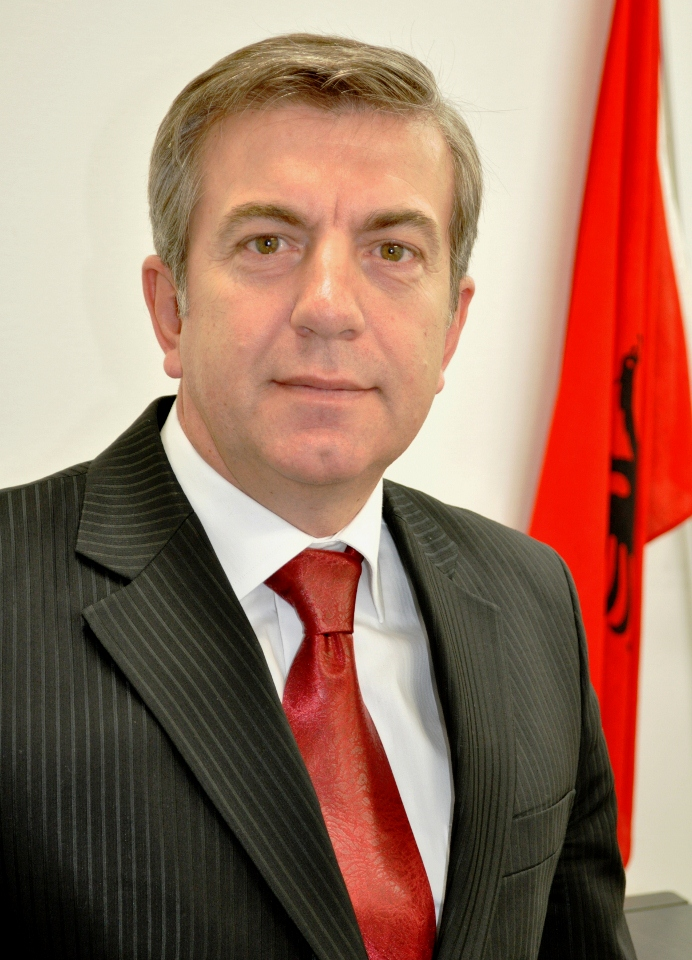

Ambassador of the Republic of Albania to Japan
- In office December 12, 2007 – March 26, 2015
- President: Bamir Topi
- Succeeded by: Gjergj Teneqexhiu

Personal details
- Born: May 7, 1961 (age 65) Kukës, Albania
- Spouse: Reko Dida
- Children: 1
- Education: University of Tirana; Tohoku University

Bujar Dida (born May 7, 1961) is an Albanian chemistry Ph.D and D.Sc and the first Ambassador of the Republic of Albania to Japan. He was nominated as ambassador on December 12, 2007, by President Bamir Topi.

== Early life and education ==
Dida was born in Kukës, Albania.

He holds two academic degrees; "Doctor of Science" from the University of Tirana (1994) and "Doctor of Philosophy" from Tohoku University, Sendai, Japan (1999). He conducted post graduate studies in Japan with scholarship "Monbukagakusho" (1995–1999) Japan.

== Professional career ==
He has been the director of the project "Education Reform" — World Bank (2000–2004), Director General of Superphosphates Plant in Laç (1990–1993), Albania and lecturer for Chemical Reactors, Physical Chemistry and General and Inorganic Chemistry at the University of Tirana and the Polytechnic University of Tirana, where he still continues the main direction of his career.

== Diplomatic career ==
Dida began his diplomatic career as the first Honorary Consul General of Japan in Albania for a 9-year period (2000–2009)

Dida was the first Albanian ambassador to Japan, since the establishment of diplomatic relations between two countries. Dida was nominated in December 2007 and ended his duty in March 2015. The post of an ambassador to Japan was vacant and was only instated for the first time after an 87-year period since the time of recognition of Albania from Japan (April 1922) and 28 years after reactivation the relations (March 1981) with Japan.

During his term he was acquainted with several Japanese high officials such as Prime Minister Shinzo Abe, Speaker of the House of Representatives of Japan Bunmei Ibuki, Minister of Foreign Affairs Fumio Kishida etc..

On 29 April 2018, the Japanese Government awarded the "Order of the Rising Sun, Gold and Silver Star Rays" for his services of contributing to strengthening the bilateral relations between Japan and Albania and promoting Japanese language education, becoming the first Albanian receiving this degree of decoration from the Japanese Emperor.

The decoration ceremony was held on June 21, 2018, by Ambassador of Japan in Albania Makoto Ito in the presence of former President Rexhep Mejdani, Deputy Minister of Europe and Foreign Relations Etjen Xhafaj, Rector of Polytechnic University of Tirana Prof. Andrea Maliqari, many colleagues of former ambassador Dida from MoFA and PUT as well as 80 other invitees.

== Activities in Japan ==
In the period of service as ambassador to Japan, he and his wife, Reko Dida, held many activities to organize high-level visits, the following are some of the activities and events that Dida attended/organized:

- Promoted further the cooperation with Japan through JICA for specific projects and training of human resources.
- Worked closely with Japan Foundation for cultural exchanges and the development of curriculum teaching Japanese language in Albania.
- Collaborated with Japan Association of Travel Agents (JATA) for the development and presentation of Albanian tourism.
- Wrote many articles in The Japan Times and other media.
- Attended the reception of A-bombed stones from the Stone for Peace Association of Hiroshima.
- Was invited to several universities and academia to present Albania and its development and promote further the granting of scholarships for students and Albanian inter-university cooperation.
- Attended the Third Black-Sea Conference.
- Attended the Fukushima Ministerial Conference on Nuclear Safety, following the events of the 2011 Tōhoku earthquake and tsunami.

Diplomatic posts
Preceded by Kujtim Xhani (resident in Beijing)	Republic of Albania Ambassador to Japan; 2009–2015	Succeeded by Gjergj Teneqexhiu
