= Mekedes Alemeshete =

Ethiopian long-distance runner

Personal information
- Full name: Mekedes Alemeshete Yadeti
- Nationality: Ethiopia
- Born: 30 March 2006 (20 years, 93 days old)
- Agent: Juan Pedro Pineda de la Losa
- Height: 154 cm (5 ft 1 in)
- Weight: 42 kg (93 lb)

Sport
- Sport: Athletics
- Event(s): 5000 metres 3000 metres

Achievements and titles
- National finals: 2022 Ethiopian Champs; • 1500m, 9th
- Personal best(s): 5000 m: 14:45.13 (2023) 3000 m: 8:36.71 (2023)
Medal record
Women's athletics
Representing Ethiopia
World U20 Championships
Gold medal – first place	2024 Lima	5000 m
- Updated on 20 February 2024

Mekedes Alemeshete Yadeti (born 30 March 2006), also spelled Mekdes Alemshet, Alemeshete Yadeti, Merkedes Alemeshete Yadeti, or Mekides Alemshet, is an Ethiopian long-distance runner. After winning the Desafio Nerja and Jaén Paraíso Interior meetings in Spain, she was one of the top 3000 m performers in 2023, scoring seven points in that discipline of the 2023 Diamond League. She won the 5000 metres at the 2024 World U20 championships.

== Career ==
Mekedes began racing competitively in 2021, finishing 12th in the 1500 m at the December Ethiopian Athletics Federation club competition behind Hirut Meshesha. In 2022, she competed at her first Ethiopian Athletics Championships, finishing 9th in the 1500 m with a 4:17.0 clocking.

After being signed to Spanish agent Juan Pedro Pineda de la Losa, Mekedes began racing the international athletics circuit in 2023. Indoors, she finished 7th in the 3000 m at the 2023 Meeting Hauts-de-France Pas-de-Calais, running 8:46.70. On 18 May, Mekedes achieved her first circuit win in the 1500 m at the Meeting Desafio Nerja Restaurante Pulguilla Y Ayo in Nerja – followed by winning her 5000 m debut at the Meeting Jaén Paraíso Interior in Andújar. This led to her being invited to the 2023 Diamond League meetings in Chorzów, Xiamen, and Brussels, scoring top-8 points in all three events. Her 8:36.71 3000 m performance at the Xiamen Diamond League ranked 22nd in the year 2023.

In 2024, Mekedes competed at the Meeting Lieven, finishing 11th. Outdoors, she won the 2024 Diamond League Shanghai 5000 m, beating Letesenbet Gidey in what was billed as a world record attempt. At the 2024 World U20 championships, Mekedes won the 5000 metres with a World U20 Championships best time of 14:57.44 (originally finished second behind Medina Eisa, but Eisa was later given an two-year ban for age falsification violations and stripped of her gold medal).

== Personal life ==
Mekedes runs under Spanish athletics manager Juan Pedro Pineda, alongside Olympic medallist Gudaf Tsegay.

== Statistics ==
=== Personal best progression ===
3000m progression
#	Mark	Pl.	Competition	Venue	Date	Ref.
1	8:46.70	7th	Meeting Hauts-de-France Pas-de-Calais	Liévin, France	14 Feb 2023	
2	8:41.57	8th	Kamila Skolimowska Memorial	Chorzów, Poland	15 Jul 2023	
3	8:36.71	6th	Xiamen Diamond League	Xiamen, China	1 Sep 2023	
