= Netsanet Desta =

Ethiopian athlete (born 2000)

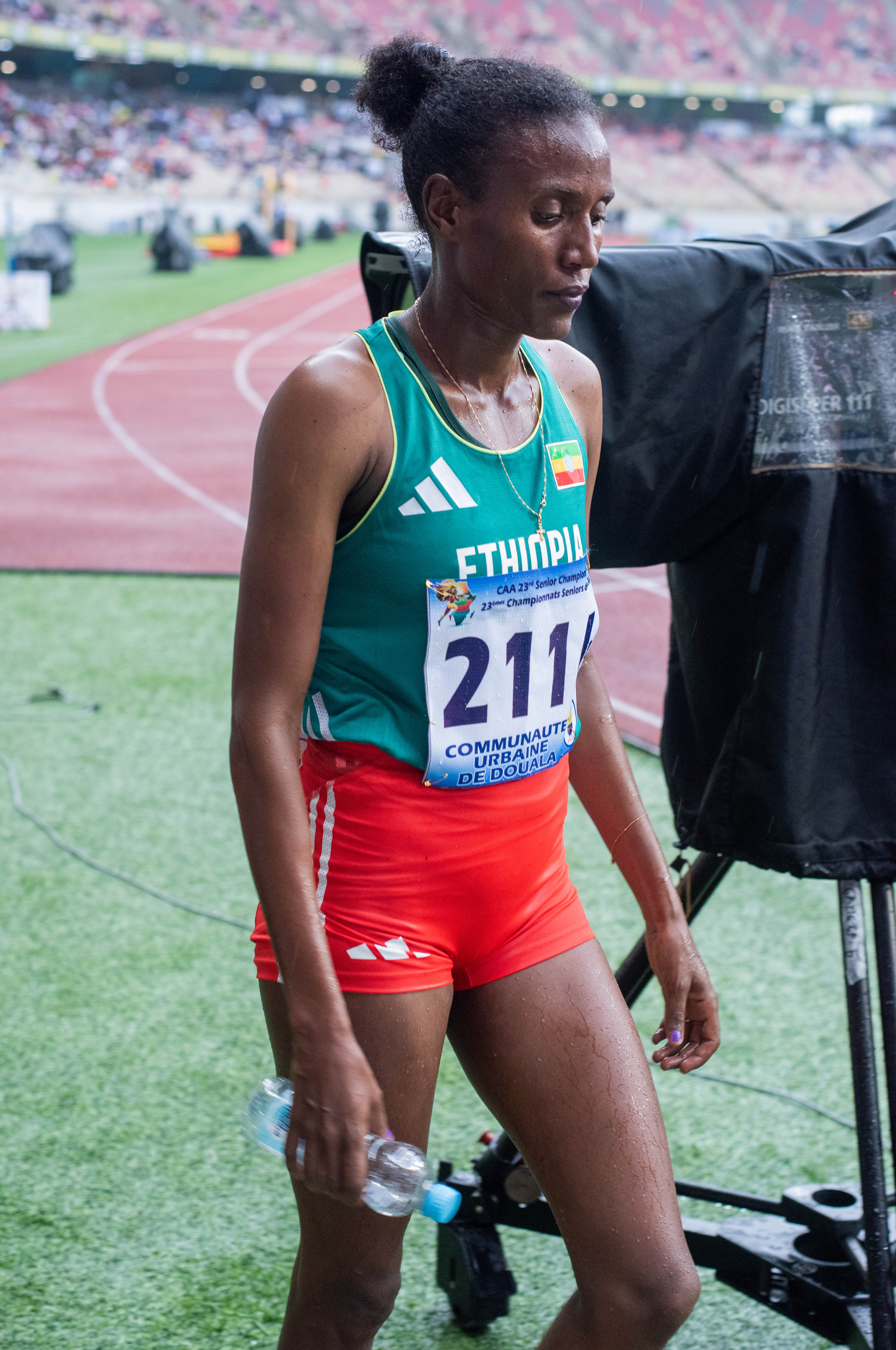

Personal information
- Full name: Netsanet Desta Gebre
- Nationality: Ethiopian
- Born: 26 October 2000 (age 25)

Sport
- Sport: Athletics

Achievements and titles
- Personal bests: Outdoor; 800 m: 1:59.39 (2021); 1500 m: 4:00.69 (2025); Mile: 4:37.86 (2022); Indoor; 800 m: 2:03.57 (2022); 1500 m: 4:04.24 (2024); Mile: 4:24.80 (2024)

Netsanet Desta Gebre (born 26 October 2000) is an Ethiopian athlete. She competed in the women's 800m event at the 2020 Summer Olympics.
