= Marta Alemayo =

Ethiopian track and field athlete (born 2008)

- Marta Alemayo at 2024 World Athletics Cross Country Championships in Belgrade

Personal information
- Nationality: Ethiopian
- Born: 8 April 2008 (age 18)

Sport
- Country: Ethiopia
- Sport: Athletics
- Event: Long-distance running
Medal record
Women's athletics
Representing Ethiopia
World Cross Country Championships
Gold medal – first place	2026 Tallahassee	U20 race
Gold medal – first place	2024 Belgrade	U20 race
Gold medal – first place	2024 Belgrade	U20 team
World U20 Championships
Bronze medal – third place	2024 Lima	3000 m

Marta Alemayo (born 8 April 2008) is an Ethiopian long-distance runner. In 2024 and 2026, she won the world under-20 cross country championships. In January 2025, she set a new U18 world best time for the 3000m indoors. In May 2025, she also set a new U18 world best time for the 3000m outdoors.

== Biography ==
Alemayo finished fourth in the Ethiopian world championship cross country trials u20 race in 2024. On 30 March 2024, she won the U20 individual event, as well as gold in the team U20 race, at the 2024 World Athletics Cross Country Championships in Serbia. Winning at 15 years and 357 days old, Alemayo became the youngest women's under-20 world cross country champion of the 21st century, and the youngest since the Kenyan Rose Kosgei in 1997 who was 15 years and 213 days.

On 20 April 2024, she ran 15:14.54 to win the 5000 metres at the Kip Keino Classic in Nairobi. In August 2024, she won the bronze medal over 3000 metres at the 2024 World Athletics U20 Championships in Lima, Peru.

She ran 8:39.80 for the 3000m in Astana on the 2025 World Athletics Indoor Tour to set a new world under-18 best, on 25 January 2025 beating the previous mark of 8:46.01 set by Gotytom Gebreslase in 2012. On 25 May 2025, she ran 8:32.20 for the 3000m in Rabat on the 2025 Diamond League to set a new world under-18 best, beating the previous mark of 8:36.45 set by Ma Ningning in 1993.

On 10 January 2026, she retained her women's under-20 title at the 2026 World Athletics Cross Country Championships in Tallahassee, winning by 28 seconds ahead of compatriot Wosane Asefa.

Alemayo won the women's 5 km in 14:15 at the Urban Trail de Lille in France on 4 April 2026, to move to third on the world all-time list behind only Beatrice Chebet and Agnes Ngetich. In May, she ran a personal best 14:32.84 for the 5000 m at the 2026 Shanghai Diamond League and on 19 June, placed third in the 5000 m with 14:55.65 at the 2026 Doha Diamond League. On 4 July, Alemayo placed fourth over two miles at the 2026 Prefontaine Classic. On 23 August, she placed fourth over 5000 m in the Diamond League at the 2026 Kamila Skolimowska Memorial in Silesia, Poland. At the 2026 Diamond League Final in Brussels in September, she placed ninth in the 5000 metres.
