= Athlete Refugee Team at the 2025 World Athletics Championships =

- WA code: ART

in Tokyo, Japan 13 September 2025 – 21 September 2025
- Competitors: 6 (4 men and 2 women)
- Medals: Gold 0 Silver 0 Bronze 0 Total 0

World Athletics Championships appearances (overview)
- 2017; 2019; 2022; 2023; 2025

The Athlete Refugee Team competed at the 2025 World Athletics Championships in Tokyo, Japan, from 13 to 21 September 2025.

== Results ==
The Athlete Refugee Team comprised 6 athletes to the championships: 2 women and 4 men.

Key

- Q = Qualified for the next round
- q = Qualified for the next round as a fastest loser or, in field events, by position without achieving the qualifying target
- NR = National record
- PB = Personal best
- SB = Season best
- N/A = Round not applicable for the event

=== Men ===
Track and road events

| Athlete | Event | Heat | | Semifinal | | Final | |
| Athlete | Event | Result | Rank | Result | Rank | Result | Rank |
|---|---|---|---|---|---|---|---|
| Musa Suliman | 800 metres | 1:48.28 SB | 9 | Did not advance | | | |
| Jamal Abdelmaji Eisa Mohammed | 5000 metres | 13:58.90 | 20 | —N/a | | Did not advance | |
| Omar Hassan | Marathon | —N/a | | | | 2:19:47 | 41 |
| Kiruhura Emmanuel Ntagunga | Marathon | —N/a | | | | 2:19:11 | 39 |

=== Women ===
Track and road events

| Athlete | Event | Heat | | Semifinal | | Final | |
| Athlete | Event | Result | Rank | Result | Rank | Result | Rank |
|---|---|---|---|---|---|---|---|
| Perina Lokure Nakang | 800 metres | 2:10.13 SB | 9 | Did not advance | | | |
| Farida Abaroge | 5000 metres | 16:27.35 | 20 | —N/a | | Did not advance | |
