= 2022 African Championships in Athletics – Women's 1500 metres =

2022 African Championships in Athletics

The women's 1500 metres event at the 2022 African Championships in Athletics was held on 9 June in Port Louis, Mauritius.

== Results ==
Rank	Athlete	Nationality	Time	Notes
1st place, gold medalist(s)	Winny Chebet	Kenya	4:16.10	
2nd place, silver medalist(s)	Purity Chepkirui	Kenya	4:16.28	
3rd place, bronze medalist(s)	Ayal Dagnachew	Ethiopia	4:16.45	
4	Brenda Chebet	Kenya	4:17.25	
5	Janat Chemusto	Uganda	4:21.36	
6	Carina Viljoen	South Africa	4:21.65	
7	Souhra Ali Mohamed	Djibouti	4:21.66	
8	Knight Aciru	Uganda	4:22.75	
9	Danielle Verster	South Africa	4:26.40	
10	Anjelina Nadai Lohalith	ART	4:33.74	
	Sarah Chelangat	Uganda	DNS	
	Diribe Welteji	Ethiopia	DNS	
	Natacha Ngoye	Republic of the Congo	DNS	
