= Athlete Refugee Team at the 2022 World Athletics Championships =

- WA code: ART
- National federation: World Athletics

in Eugene, United States 15–24 July 2022
- Competitors: 3 (2 men and 1 woman)

World Athletics Championships appearances (overview)
- 2017; 2019; 2022; 2023; 2025

Athlete Refugee Team competed at the 2022 World Athletics Championships in Eugene, United States, from 15 to 24 July 2022. It entered 3 athletes.

== Entrants ==
Track and road events

Athlete	Event	Preliminary		Heat		Semi-final		Final	
Athlete	Event	Result	Rank	Result	Rank	Result	Rank	Result	Rank
Dorian Keletela	Men's 100 metres	10.48 (+1.1)	5 Q	10.52 (+0.2)	47	did not advance			
Jamal Abdelmaji Eisa Mohammed	Men's 5000 metres	—N/a		14:02.79	36	—N/a		did not advance	
Atalena Napule Gaspore	Women's 800 metres	—N/a		DNS		did not advance			
Anjelina Nadai Lohalith	Women's 1500 metres	—N/a		4:23.84	42	did not advance			
