= Athlete Refugee Team at the 2023 World Athletics Championships =

- WA code: ART
- National federation: World Athletics

in Budapest, Hungary 19–27 August 2023
- Competitors: 6 (4 men and 2 women)
- Medals: Gold 0 Silver 0 Bronze 0 Total 0

World Athletics Championships appearances (overview)
- 2017; 2019; 2022; 2023; 2025

The Athlete Refugee Team competed at the 2023 World Athletics Championships in Budapest, Hungary, from 19 to 27 August 2023.

== Results ==
The Athlete Refugee Team entered 6 athletes.

=== Men ===
Track and road events

Athlete	Event	Heat		Semifinal		Final	
Athlete	Event	Result	Rank	Result	Rank	Result	Rank
Omar Hassan	Marathon	—N/a				2:14:23	41
Fouad Idbafdil	3000 metres steeplechase	8:39.21	12	—N/a		Did not advance	

Field events

Athlete	Event	Qualification		Final	
Athlete	Event	Distance	Position	Distance	Position
Mohammad Amin Alsalami	Long jump	7.46	33	Did not advance	

=== Women ===
Track and road events

Athlete	Event	Heat		Semifinal		Final	
Athlete	Event	Result	Rank	Result	Rank	Result	Rank
Perina Lokure Nakang	800 metres	2:15.84	8	Did not advance			
Anjelina Nadai Lohalith	5000 metres	15:35.25	15	—N/a		Did not advance	
