= Athlete Refugee Team at the World Athletics Championships =

Athlete Refugee Team at the World Athletics Championships may refer to:

- Athlete Refugee Team at the 2017 World Championships in Athletics
- Athlete Refugee Team at the 2019 World Athletics Championships
- Athlete Refugee Team at the 2022 World Athletics Championships
- Athlete Refugee Team at the 2023 World Athletics Championships
- Athlete Refugee Team at the 2025 World Athletics Championships
