= Hawi Abera =

Ethiopian long-distance runner

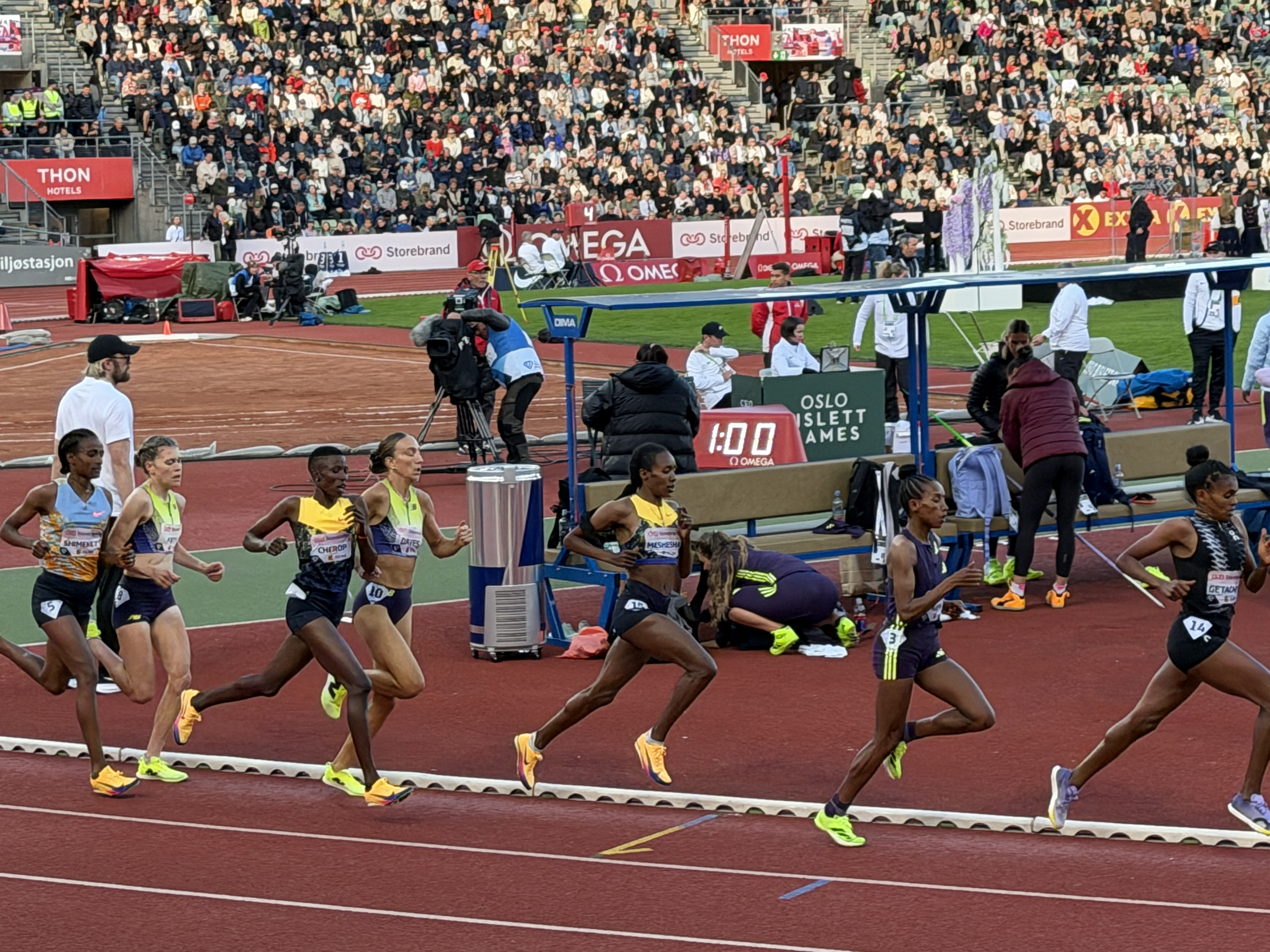
- Abera at the 2026 Bislett Games

Personal information
- Nationality: Ethiopian
- Born: December 17, 2006 (age 19)

Sport
- Country: Ethiopia
- Sport: Athletics
- Events: Middle-distance running, Cross Country running

Achievements and titles
- Personal bests: 1500 m: 4:04.92 (Rabat 2025); 5000m: 14:35.96 (Shanghai, 2026)
Medal record
Women's athletics
Representing Ethiopia
African Games
Silver medal – second place	2023 Accra	1500 m
World Cross Country Championships
Silver medal – second place	2023 Bathurst	Mixed relay

Hawi Abera (born 17 December 2006) is an Ethiopian middle-distance and cross country runner. She was a silver medalist in the mixed team relay at the 2023 World Athletics Cross Country Championships, and over 1500 metres at the 2023 African Games.

== Biography ==
Abera was a silver medalist in the mixed team relay at the 2023 World Athletics Cross Country Championships in Bathurst, Australia, alongside Birke Haylom, Getnet Wale and Adehena Kasaye. She was a silver medalist over 1500 metres at the delayed 2023 African Games, held in Accra, Ghana, in March 2024, running a personal best 4:06.09 as a 17-year-old to finish as runner-up behind Hirut Meshesha.

In February 2025, whilst competing for Sporting Clube de Portugal, she won the under-20 race in Albufeira, Portugal at the 2025 European Champions Clubs Cup Cross Country. Competing in the 2025 Meeting International Mohammed VI d'Athlétisme de Rabat in Rabat, Morocco, she ran the 1500 metres in a personal best of 4:04.92. She won over 1500 metres at the 2025 Kip Keino Classic on 31 May, finishing ahead of Kenyan Purity Chepkirui in 4:06.52.

Abera finished second to compatriot Marta Alemayo in 14:22 in the women's 5 km at the Urban Trail de Lille in France on 4 April 2026, to move into the top-ten of the world all-time list. In May, she ran a personal best 14:35.96 for the 5000 m at the 2026 Shanghai Diamond League. On 19 June, she placed fifth over 5000 metres at the 2026 Doha Diamond League.
