= Mirriam Cherop =

Kenyan athlete (born 1999)

Personal information
- Nationality: Kenyan
- Born: June 25, 1999 (age 27)

Sport
- Country: Kenya
- Sport: Athletics
- Events: Middle-distance running, Long-distance running, Cross country running
Medal record
Women's athletics
Representing Kenya
World U20 Championships
Silver medal – second place	2018 Tampere	1500 m
World Road Running Championships
Bronze medal – third place	2026 Copenhagen	Mile
Bronze medal – third place	2026 Copenhagen	Mile mixed team
World Cross Country Championships
Gold medal – first place	2023 Bathurst	Mixed relay

Mirriam Cherop (born 25 June 1999) is a Kenyan middle-, long-distance and cross country runner. She won a gold medal in the mixed relay at the 2023 World Athletics Cross Country Championships.

== Biography ==
Cherop was a silver medalist in the 1500 metres at the 2018 IAAF World U20 Championships in Tampere, Finland, running 4:10.73.

Competing at the 2023 World Athletics Cross Country Championships in the mixed relay in Bathurst, Australia, Cherop won the gold medal running alongside Emmanuel Wanyonyi, Kyumbe Munguti and Brenda Chebet. In June 2023, she placed second behind Beatrice Chebet over 1500 metres at the Kenyan Athletics Championships. The following month, she placed fourth over that distance at the Kenyan World Championships Trials.

In February 2026, Cherop won the Almond Blossom Cross Country race, a gold race part of the World Athletics Cross Country Tour in Albufeira, Portugal. In April, she won over 1500 m in 4:08.49 at the 2026 Kip Keino Classic in Nairobi. Competing in the mile run at the World Athletics Road Running Championships on 19 September 2026, Cherop finished third in 4:25.71, a season's best time, and won the bronze medal in the mixed team competition. The following month, she placed third at the Cross Zornotza in Amorebieta, Spain and in November placed third the Cross Internacional de Soria in Spain.
