= 2022 African Championships in Athletics – Women's 800 metres =

The women's 800 metres event at the 2022 African Championships in Athletics was held 11–12 June 2022 in Port Louis, Mauritius.

== Medalists ==
Gold	Silver	Bronze
Jarinter Mwasya; Kenya	Netsanet Desta; Ethiopia	Prudence Sekgodiso; South Africa

== Results ==
=== Heats ===
Qualification: First 3 of each heat (Q) and the next 2 fastest (q) qualified for the final.

Rank	Heat	Name	Nationality	Time	Notes
1	2	Jarinter Mwasya	Kenya	2:01.07	Q
2	2	Worknesh Mesele	Ethiopia	2:02.38	Q
3	2	Brenda Chebet	Kenya	2:02.74	Q
4	2	Assia Raziki	Morocco	2:04.03	q
5	1	Netsanet Desta	Ethiopia	2:04.17	Q
6	1	Prudence Sekgodiso	South Africa	2:04.20	Q
7	1	Naomi Korir	Kenya	2:04.47	Q
8	2	Gena Löfstrand	South Africa	2:04.90	q
9	2	Knight Aciru	Uganda	2:06.11	
10	1	Firezewd Tesfaye	Ethiopia	2:07.87	
11	1	Amna Bakhit	Sudan	2:10.68	
12	2	Oratile Nowe	Botswana	2:12.81	
13	1	Honorine Iribagiza	Rwanda	2:13.09	
14	2	Marli Dimond	South Africa	2:14.73	
15	1	Malika Ramasawmy	Mauritius	2:18.56	
16	1	Anjelina Nadai Lohalith	ART	2:19.29	

=== Final ===
Rank	Athlete	Nationality	Time	Notes
1st place, gold medalist(s)	Jarinter Mwasya	Kenya	2:02.80	
2nd place, silver medalist(s)	Netsanet Desta	Ethiopia	2:02.99	
3rd place, bronze medalist(s)	Prudence Sekgodiso	South Africa	2:03.46	
4	Worknesh Mesele	Ethiopia	2:03.67	
5	Assia Raziki	Morocco	2:04.75	
6	Brenda Chebet	Kenya	2:06.17	
7	Gena Löfstrand	South Africa	2:06.21	
8	Naomi Korir	Kenya	2:06.39	
