= 2021 World Athletics U20 Championships – Women's 800 metres =

Women's 800 metres at the 2021 World Athletics U20 Championships
- Venue: Kasarani Stadium
- Dates: 19 August (heats); 20 August (semifinals); 21 August (final)
- Competitors: 29 from 23 nations
- Winning time: 2:02.96

Medalists
gold medal	Ayal Dagnachew	Ethiopia
silver medal	Valentina Rosamilia	Switzerland
bronze medal	Elli Eftychia Deligianni	Greece

The women's 800 metres at the 2021 World Athletics U20 Championships was held at the Kasarani Stadium from 19 to 21 August.

== Records ==
Standing records prior to the 2021 World Athletics U20 Championships
World U20 Record	Pamela Jelimo (KEN)	1:54.01	Zürich, Switzerland	29 August 2008
Championship Record	Diribe Welteji (ETH)	1:59.74	Tampere, Finland	12 July 2018
World U20 Leading	Athing Mu (USA)	1:55.21	Tokyo, Japan	3 August 2021

== Results ==
=== Heats ===
Qualification: First 3 of each heat (Q) and the 4 fastest times (q) qualified for the semifinals.

Rank	Heat	Name	Nationality	Time	Note
1	3	Ayal Dagnachew	Ethiopia	2:02.94	Q, PB
2	1	Elli Eftychia Deligianni	Greece	2:05.38	Q
3	3	Zita Urbán	Hungary	2:07.39	Q, PB
4	1	Svitlana Zhulzhyk	Ukraine	2:07.61	Q
5	4	Avery Pearson	Canada	2:07.99	Q
6	2	Marina Martínez	Spain	2:08.21	Q
7	2	Veronika Sadek	Slovenia	2:08.34	Q
8	1	Mebriht Mekonen	Ethiopia	2:08.62	Q
9	3	Valentina Rosamilia	Switzerland	2:08.89	Q
10	3	Petja Klojčnik	Slovenia	2:09.11	q
11	2	Gabriella Szabó	Hungary	2:09.39	q
12	2	Annelies Nijssen	Belgium	2:09.44	Q
13	2	Lorena Rangel	Mexico	2:09.86	Q
14	4	Pavla Štoudková	Czech Republic	2:10.27	q
15	3	Federica Pansini	Italy	2:10.34	q
16	4	Pooja	India	2:10.66	
17	1	Tharushi Dissanayaka	Sri Lanka	2:10.70	Q
18	2	Aviwe Hoboloshe	South Africa	2:11.65	
19	1	Dunja Sikima	Serbia	2:12.04	
20	4	Brenda Chebet	Kenya	2:12.16	
21	4	Sebah Amar	Eritrea	2:13.28	
22	1	Shanika Kahawalage	Sri Lanka	2:20.37	
23	4	Chamsiya Yahaya	Niger	2:31.55	PB
24	2	Larisa Talpiș	Romania	2:38.33	
25	3	Alice Ilam Samuel	ART	2:43.76	PB
	4	Sheila Chepkosgei	Kenya	DQ	TR17.3.1
	3	Daily Cooper	Cuba	DQ	TR17.3.1
	4	Aster Yibabie	Eritrea	DQ	TR17.5
	3	Perina Togo	South Sudan	DQ	TR17.3.1

=== Semifinals ===
Qualification: First 3 of each heat (Q) and the 2 fastest times (q) qualified for the final.

Rank	Heat	Name	Nationality	Time	Note
1	1	Ayal Dagnachew	Ethiopia	2:04.26	Q
2	1	Svitlana Zhulzhyk	Ukraine	2:06.28	Q
3	1	Elli Eftychia Deligianni	Greece	2:06.41	Q
4	1	Annelies Nijssen	Belgium	2:07.13	q
5	2	Marina Martínez	Spain	2:07.22	Q
6	2	Valentina Rosamilia	Switzerland	2:07.23	Q
7	2	Veronika Sadek	Slovenia	2:07.41	Q
8	1	Avery Pearson	Canada	2:07.46	q
9	2	Mebriht Mekonen	Ethiopia	2:07.53	
10	1	Gabriella Szabó	Hungary	2:08.05	
11	2	Zita Urbán	Hungary	2:08.46	
12	1	Federica Pansini	Italy	2:08.83	
13	2	Pavla Štoudková	Czech Republic	2:09.14	
14	1	Petja Klojčnik	Slovenia	2:09.97	
15	2	Lorena Rangel	Mexico	2:10.08	
16	2	Tharushi Dissanayaka	Sri Lanka	2:17.82	

=== Final ===
The final was held on 21 August at 16:46.

Rank	Lane	Name	Nationality	Time	Note
1st place, gold medalist(s)	6	Ayal Dagnachew	Ethiopia	2:02.96	
2nd place, silver medalist(s)	4	Valentina Rosamilia	Switzerland	2:04.29	
3rd place, bronze medalist(s)	8	Elli Eftychia Deligianni	Greece	2:04.66	
4	2	Veronika Sadek	Slovenia	2:04.96	PB
5	3	Svitlana Zhulzhyk	Ukraine	2:06.04	
6	5	Marina Martínez	Spain	2:06.42(.414)	
7	1	Avery Pearson	Canada	2:06.42(.415)	PB
8	7	Annelies Nijssen	Belgium	2:09.55	
