= Athletics at the 2023 African Games – Women's 1500 metres =

The women's 1500 metres event at the 2023 African Games was held on 21 and 22 March 2024 in Accra, Ghana.

== Medalists ==
Gold	Silver	Bronze
Hirut Meshesha; Ethiopia	Hawi Abera; Ethiopia	Mary Ekiru; Kenya

== Results ==
=== Heats ===
Qualification: First 4 in each heat (Q) and the next 4 fastest (q) advanced to the final.

Rank	Heat	Name	Nationality	Time	Notes
1	1	Hirut Meshesha	Ethiopia	4:14.41	Q
2	1	Mary Ekiru	Kenya	4:15.02	Q
3	1	Bikile Ambesu	Ethiopia	4:15.50	Q
4	1	Knight Aciru	Uganda	4:16.47	Q
5	2	Hawi Abera	Ethiopia	4:16.51	Q
6	2	Lydia Lagat	Kenya	4:17.04	Q
7	2	Halimah Nakaayi	Uganda	4:18.95	Q
8	2	Roza Haile	Eritrea	4:20.15	Q
9	1	Ronke Akanbi	Nigeria	4:27.63	q
10	1	Ariella Harerimana	Burundi	4:33.73	q
11	2	Haleca Joana	Angola	4:35.52	q
12	2	Odette Sawekoua	Benin	4:37.67	q
13	1	Jane Sento Kargbo	Sierra Leone	4:43.48	
14	2	Belvia Boy-Fini	Central African Republic	4:47.36	
	1	Lilian Odira	Kenya	DNS	

=== Final ===
Rank	Name	Nationality	Time	Notes
1st place, gold medalist(s)	Hirut Meshesha	Ethiopia	4:05.71	GR
2nd place, silver medalist(s)	Hawi Abera	Ethiopia	4:06.09	
3rd place, bronze medalist(s)	Mary Ekiru	Kenya	4:06.22	
4	Bikile Ambesu	Ethiopia	4:07.67	
5	Halimah Nakaayi	Uganda	4:09.40	
6	Knight Aciru	Uganda	4:09.81	
7	Lydia Lagat	Kenya	4:14.14	
8	Roza Haile	Eritrea	4:18.09	
9	Ronke Akanbi	Nigeria	4:25.42	
10	Ariella Harerimana	Burundi	4:34.07	
11	Odette Sawekoua	Benin	4:35.12	
12	Haleca Joana	Angola	4:36.27	
