= Lucia Stafford =

Canadian runner (b. 1998)

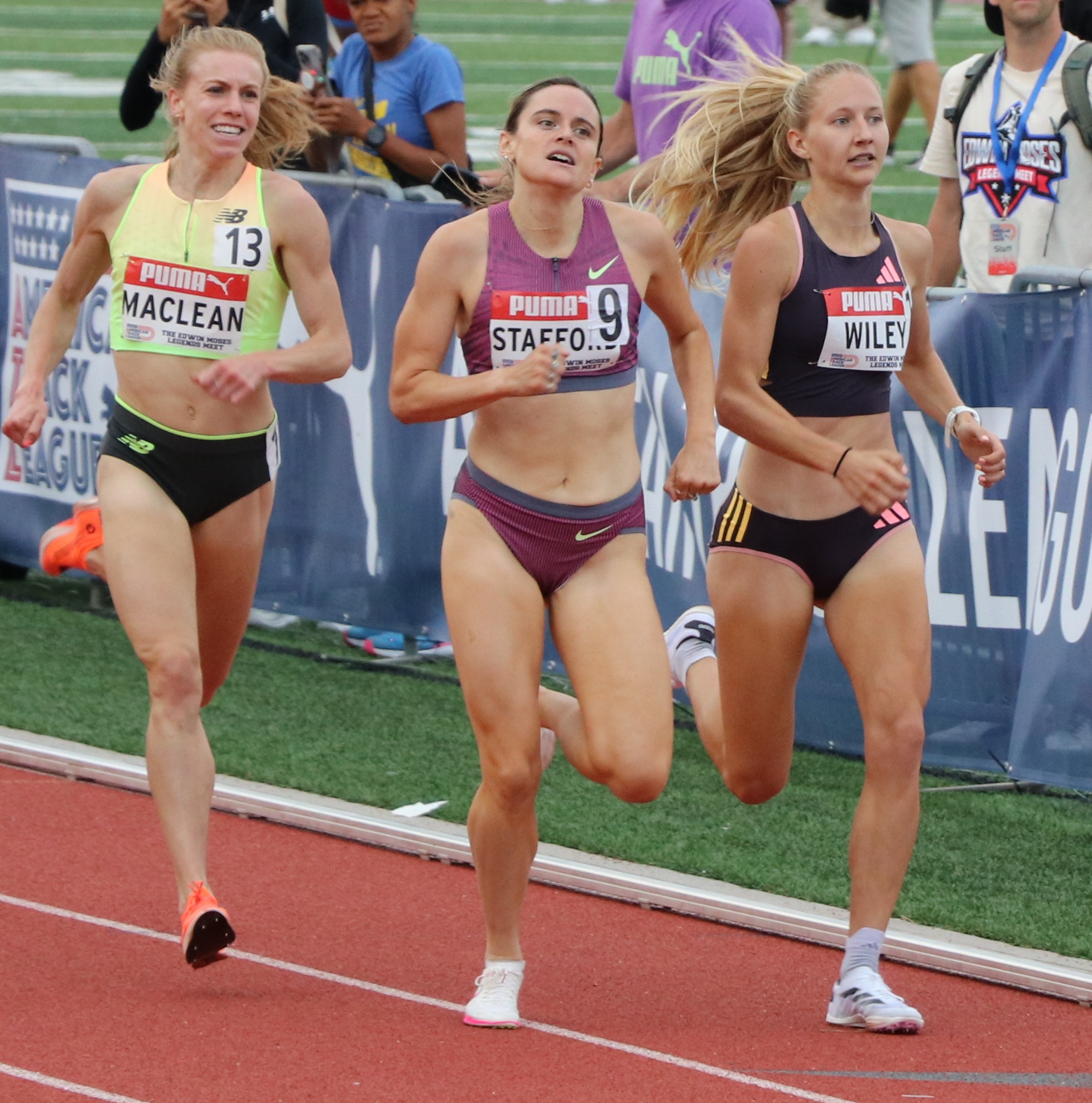
- Stafford in the 1500m at the 2024 Edwin Moses Legends Meet

Personal information
- Born: August 17, 1998 (age 28) London, Ontario, Canada
- Education: University of Toronto (BEng.)
- Height: 170 cm (5 ft 7 in)
- Weight: 58 kg (128 lb)

Sport
- Country: Canada
- Sport: Track and field
- Event: Middle-distance running
- Coached by: Terry Radchenko

Achievements and titles
- Personal bests: 800 m: 2:00.47 (Langley 2023); 1000 m: 2:38.73 (Toronto 2020); 1500 m: 4:00.83 (Rabat 2026); Indoors; 1000 m: 2:33.75i AR (Boston 2023); 1500 m: 4:04.29i+ (New York 2023); Mile: 4:22.72i (New York 2023)
Medal record
Women's track and field
Representing Canada
NACAC Championships
Bronze medal – third place	2025 Freeport	1500 m
Pan American U20 Championships
Gold medal – first place	2017 Trujillo	1500 m

Lucia Stafford (born August 17, 1998) is a Canadian athlete specializing in middle-distance running. She is the 2017 Pan American U20 champion in the women's 1500 metres, and competed for Canada at the 2020 Tokyo Olympics. Stafford is the North American indoor record holder for the 1000 metres.

== Early life ==
Stafford was born in London, Ontario and grew up in Toronto. Her father James Stafford was a former competitive runner and represented Canada at four World Cross Country Championships. She and her older sister Gabriela DeBues-Stafford initially trained in competitive Irish dancing, but DeBues-Stafford switched to running, subsequently joined by Stafford to spend more time with her father and sister. Both sisters were diagnosed with Graves' disease as teenagers, with Stafford's case proving a considerable hindrance in her early career.

== Career ==
In 2017, Stafford won gold at the 2017 Pan American U20 Athletics Championships in the women's 1500 metres event. She was accepted to the University of Toronto to study civil engineering, and while there, competed for the Varsity Blues. At the 2019 Summer Universiade, Stafford finished in fifth in the 4x400 relay and the 1500 m.

The onset of the COVID-19 pandemic resulted in the cancellation of much of the 2020 athletic season and the 2020 Summer Olympics in Tokyo being delayed by a full year. For Stafford, this afforded her time to recover from a thyroid procedure that she credited with allowing her to train more consistently. In July 2021, Stafford was named to Canada's 2020 Olympic team in the women's 1500 m event, alongside her sister. She qualified to the semi-final, but finished thirteenth overall there, 0.43 seconds behind Spain's Marta Pérez, and missed advancing to the final. Her time of 4:02.12 was a new personal best.

In advance of the 2022 season, Stafford moved to train at the Bowerman Track Club in Portland, joining her sister Gabriela. However, they would both depart the club early in the following year, citing controversy around another club member, Shelby Houlihan. Stafford made her World Indoor debut at the 2022 edition in Belgrade, finishing eighth in the 1500 m. She went on to make her World Athletics Championships debut as well, but came thirty-fourth in the heats of the 4:09.67 and did not advance to the semi-finals. She was also named to Canada's team for the 2022 Commonwealth Games in Birmingham, but her preparations were hindered by contracting COVID-19. Despite this, she qualified to the 1500 m final and finished eleventh, albeit well off her personal best. Stafford reflected that "all you can ask for yourself is to do your best. I know it's very far from where I want to be, but I always count on myself to do my best."

Following her departure from the Bowerman Club, Stafford resumed training in Toronto with longtime coach Terry Radchenko. On January 28, 2023, Stafford broke the North American indoor record in the 1000 metres with a time of 2:33.75 at the Boston University John Thomas Terrier Classic in Boston. She moved to ninth on the world indoor all-time list. After narrowly missing the World Athletics Championship qualifying standard for the 1500 m at the 2023 Millrose Games, she cleared it with a personal best 4:02.03 at the USATF LA Grand Prix on May 27. Stafford finished 28th in the heats of the 1500 m at the 2023 World Athletics Championships, running a 4:05.21. She later described the heat as "probably the most physical race I've been in. When you're competing with the best in the world, there's no room for imperfection."

She competed in the 1500 metres at the 2024 Summer Olympics in Paris in August 2024.

In May 2026, Stafford ran a personal best 4:00.83 in the 1500 metres at the 2026 Meeting International Mohammed VI d'Athlétisme de Rabat. She placed fourth in the mile run at the 2026 Commonwealth Games in Scotland on 1 August. Competing in the mile at the 2026 World Athletics Road Running Championships in Copenhagen, Stafford ran to an eighth place finish in a road personal best of 4:29.51.

== Personal life ==
Stafford is the daughter of Jamie Stafford, a statistics professor at the University of Toronto, and Maria Luisa Gardner, a teacher. When Stafford was 10, her mother died from leukemia. Stafford has an older sister Gabriela Debues-Stafford, who is also an Olympian runner. She also has a younger brother, Nicholas. Stafford’s family includes her stepmother, Leanne Shafir, and stepsisters, Talia and Gabrielle. Both Gabriela and Lucia are trilingual, speaking English, French and Spanish.

In the fall of 2022, Stafford enrolled in the singer/songwriter program at Seneca College.

== Statistics ==
=== Circuit performances ===
Grand Slam Track results
Slam	Race group	Event	Pl.	Time	Prize money
2025 Miami Slam	Short distance	1500 m	6th	4:14.66	US$10,000
2025 Miami Slam	Short distance	800 m	8th	2:04.93	US$10,000

=== Competition record ===
Representing Canada
Year	Competition	Venue	Position	Event	Time
2016	World U20 Championships	Bydgoszcz, Poland	13th (h)	1500 m	4:22.38
2017	Pan American U20 Championships	Trujillo, Peru	1st	1500 m	4:21.70
2019	Universiade	Naples, Italy	5th	1500 m	4:12.70
2019	Universiade	Naples, Italy	5th	4 x 400 m	3:34.62
2021	Olympic Games	Tokyo, Japan	13th (sf)	1500 m	4:02.12
2022	World Indoor Championships	Belgrade, Serbia	8th	1500 m	4:06.41
2022	World Championships	Eugene, United States	34th (h)	1500 m	4:09.67
2022	Commonwealth Games	Birmingham, United Kingdom	11th	1500 m	4:13.83
2023	World Championships	Budapest, Hungary	28th (h)	1500 m	4:05.21
2024	World Indoor Championships	Glasgow, United Kingdom	11th	1500 m	4:08.90
2024	Olympic Games	Paris, France	5th (rep)	1500 m	4:04.26
2025	World Indoor Championships	Nanjing, China	12th (h)	1500 m	4:13.45
2025	NACAC Championships	Freeport, Bahamas	3rd	1500 m	4:11.11
2025	World Championships	Tokyo, Japan	38th (h)	1500 m	4:08.98
2026	World Indoor Championships	Toruń, Poland	8th (h)	1500 m	4:12.81
2026	Commonwealth Games	Glasgow, United Kingdom	4th	Mile	4:40.46
2026	World Road Running Championships	Copenhagen, Denmark	8th	Road mile	4:29.51
