= Worknesh Mesele =

Ethiopian athlete

Woknesh Musele
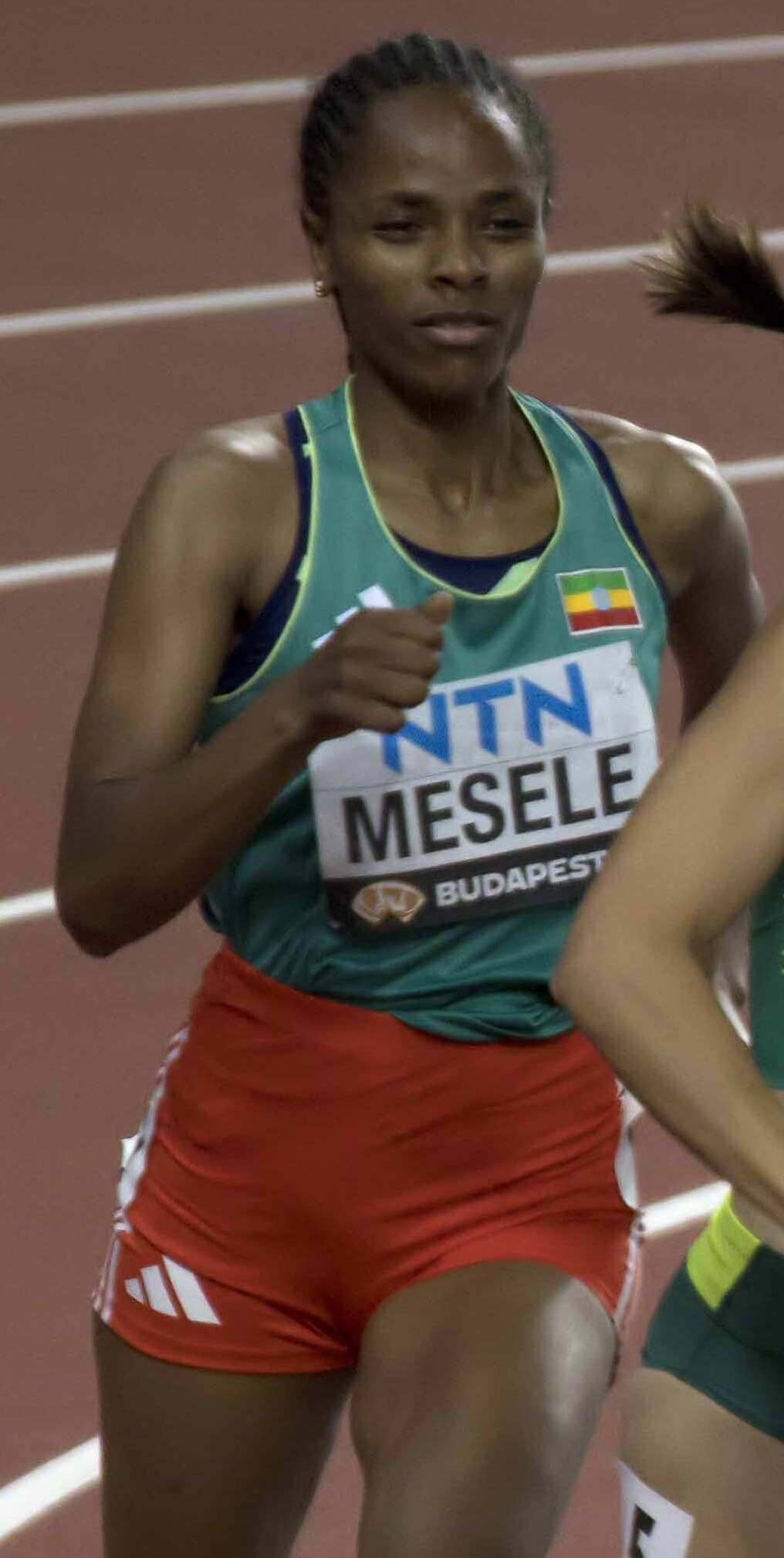
- Worknesh Mesele in 2023

Personal information
- Nationality: Ethiopian
- Born: Worknesh Musele Handeno; 10 June 2001 (age 25) Shebedino, Sidama Region, Ethiopia

Sport
- Sport: Track and Field
- Events: 400 m, 800 m, 1500 m

Worknesh Musele Handeno (born 10 June 2001) is an Ethiopian athlete who has won Ethiopian national championship titles over 400 metres and 800 metres.

== Biography ==
Musele ran the 11th fastest time in the world in 2021 in the women's 800 m when she completed the Ethiopian Olympic Trial. She had previously competed at the 2019 African Games in Kabat in the 400 m and the 4 × 400 m relay.

She ran a personal best 1:58:71 in the 800 m at the Ethiopian Olympic trial to finish third behind Werkwuha Getachew and Habitam Alemu in June 2021 to secure her place at the delayed 2020 Tokyo Olympics. Her previous personal best had been 2:02:20. She was named in the Ethiopian squad for the games, however she did not compete. On 30 June 2021 she won the 800 m at the Irena Szewińska Memorial meeting in Bydgoszcz on the 2021 World Athletics Continental Tour, beating compatriot Diribe Welteji by .07 seconds.

In March 2022 Musele won her second national title winning the 800 m in Hawassa. She finished fourth in the 2022 African Championships in Athletics – Women's 800 metres race.

In 2023, she participated in the World Championships in Budapest, and reached the semi finals of the 800 metres.

At the 2024 Olympics, she set two new personal bests in the qualifying rounds of the 800 m, running 1:58.07 and then 1:58.06. She went on to place sixth in the final.

She ran an indoor personal best over 1500 metres, of 4:05.06, in Liévin on 13 February 2025. She lowered it again on 16 February 2025, running 4:02.19 at the Copernicus Cup. She was selected for the 1500 metres at the 2025 World Athletics Indoor Championships in Nanjing in March 2025. She finished second in the 1500 metres at the 2025 Meeting International Mohammed VI d'Athlétisme de Rabat, in May 2025. The following month, she placed fifth at the 2025 Meeting de Paris and eighth at the 2025 Prefontaine Classic on 5 July.

In September 2025, she was a semi-finalist in the women's 800 metres at the 2025 World Athletics Championships in Tokyo, Japan.

In May 2026, she placed fourth in the 1500 m at the 2026 Shanghai Diamond League, and on 19 June had a top-ten finish at the 2026 Doha Diamond League.
