= Jarinter Mwasya =

Kenyan athlete

Personal information
- Born: Jarinter Mawia Mwasya; 30 December 1996 (age 29) Iuani

Sport
- Sport: Track and Field
- Event: 800m

Achievements and titles
- Personal bests: 800m 1:59.84 (Toulouse, 2022)
Medal record
Women's athletics
Representing Kenya
African Championships
| Gold medal – first place | 2022 Mauritius | 800m |
World Cross Country Championships
| Bronze medal – third place | 2019 Aarhus | Mixed relay |

Jarinter Mwasya (born 30 December 1996) is a Kenyan track and field athlete. She was the 2022 African champion over 800 metres.

Mwaysa was issued with a four-year competition ban by the Anti-Doping Agency of Kenya due to a doping violations (set to expire in August 2027).

== Early life ==
Mwaysa is from Iuani a mountainous region in Makueni County. She started running at Nthukula Secondary School in Wote. In 2013 she achieved her first medal over 800m whilst competing at the East Africa School Games in Lira, Uganda. Mwaysa joined the Kenya Defence Force in 2015.

== Career ==
She was a bronze medalist at the 2019 IAAF World Cross Country Championships in Aarhus, in the mixed relay.

In May 2022 she achieved a new personal best time of 1:59.84 at the Meeting international du SATUC in Toulouse. Mwaysa then won the 800m African Championship race in 2022 held at Saint Pierre, Mauritius. She also won a silver medal in the women's 4 x 400 metres relay at the championships. Competing at the World Athletics Championships in Eugene, Oregon in July, 2022 Mwaysa finished fifth in her heat won by Diribe Welteji and therefore did not progress to the semi-finals. Mwaysa was sprinted out of the qualifying positions as she finished fourth in her heat racing at the 2022 Commonwealth Games 800m by Keely Hodgkinson, Catriona Bisset and Jemma Reekie with all four athletes finishing under a second apart in Birmingham, England.
