= 2024 World Athletics Cross Country Championships – Senior women's race =

Senior women's race at the 2024 World Athletics Cross Country Championships
- Organisers: World Athletics
- Edition: 45th
- Date: March 30, 2024
- Host city: Belgrade, Serbia
- Events: 1
- Distances: 10 km – Senior women
- Participation: 91 athletes from 13 nations

The Senior women's race at the 2024 World Athletics Cross Country Championships was held at Belgrade, Serbia, on March 30, 2024. Beatrice Chebet from Kenya won the gold medal by 3 seconds over Kenya's Lilian Kasait Rengeruk and Kenya's Margaret Kipkemboi, who finished third.

== Race results ==
=== Senior women's race (10 km) ===
==== Individual ====
Women's Cross Country Senior Race
Place	Athlete	Age	Country	Time
1st place, gold medalist(s)	Beatrice Chebet	24	Kenya	31:05
2nd place, silver medalist(s)	Lilian Kasait Rengeruk	26	Kenya	31:08
3rd place, bronze medalist(s)	Margaret Kipkemboi	31	Kenya	31:09
4	Emmaculate Anyango	23	Kenya	31:24
5	Agnes Jebet Ngetich	23	Kenya	31:27
6	Sarah Chelangat	22	Uganda	32:00
7	Daisy Jepkemei	28	Kazakhstan	32:04
8	Bertukan Welde	19	Ethiopia	32:14
9	Loice Chekwemoi	17	Uganda	32:24
10	Mebrat Gidey	19	Ethiopia	32:27
11	Tadelech Bekele	31	Ethiopia	32:29
12	Sisay Meseret Gola	26	Ethiopia	32:30
13	Rachael Zena Chebet	27	Uganda	32:45
14	Karoline Bjerkeli Grøvdal	33	Norway	32:49
15	Weini Kelati	27	United States	32:53
16	Annet Chemengich Chelangat	30	Uganda	32:56
17	Cintia Chepngeno	23	Kenya	33:02
18	Joy Cheptoyek	21	Uganda	33:13
19	Belinda Chemutai	23	Uganda	33:16
20	Abbie Donnelly	27	Great Britain	33:17
21	Girmawit Gebrzihair	22	Ethiopia	33:22
22	Miku Sakai	21	Japan	33:24
23	Anjelina Lohalith	29	Athlete Refugee Team	33:26
24	Carolina Robles	32	Spain	33:36
25	Bekelech Teku	20	Ethiopia	33:43
26	Irene Sánchez-Escribano	31	Spain	33:55
27	Erika Tanoura	24	Japan	34:00
28	Kyla Jacobs	29	South Africa	34:07
29	Azusa Mihara	21	Japan	34:09
30	Allie Ostrander	27	United States	34:11
31	Paige Campbell	27	Australia	34:19
32	Glenrose Xaba	29	South Africa	34:20
33	Abby Nichols	27	United States	34:27
34	Aydee Loayza Huaman	29	Peru	34:28
35	Emma Grace Hurley	26	United States	34:32
36	Seema	23	India	34:35
37	Majida Maayouf	34	Spain	34:36
38	Glynis Sim	25	Canada	34:37
39	Isabel Barreiro	24	Spain	34:37
40	Cacisile Sosibo	26	South Africa	34:40
41	Georgie Grgec	30	New Zealand	34:43
42	Leslie Sexton	36	Canada	34:55
43	Shellcy Sarmiento	23	Colombia	35:00
44	Katelyn Ayers	29	Canada	35:04
45	Lauren McNeil	24	Great Britain	35:05
46	Alice Goodall	22	Great Britain	35:10
47	Cécile Jarousseau	31	France	35:10
48	Laura Maasik	30	Estonia	35:15
49	Karabo Mailula	22	South Africa	35:17
50	Kate Bazeley	40	Canada	35:17
51	Ankita Dhyani	22	India	35:26
52	Micheline Niyomahoro	22	Burundi	35:38
53	Melissa Duncan	34	Australia	35:40
54	Mikaela Lucki	25	Canada	35:42
55	Annika Pfitzinger	31	New Zealand	35:50
56	Margarita Hernández	38	Mexico	35:53
57	Silvia Ortiz	31	Ecuador	36:06
58	Cailie Logue	25	United States	36:14
59	Momoka Kawaguchi	25	Japan	36:15
60	Zarita Suárez	29	Peru	36:17
61	Katie Newlove	21	Canada	36:19
62	Farida Abaroge	30	Athlete Refugee Team	36:33
63	Fiona Everard	25	Ireland	36:35
64	Layla Almasri	24	Palestine	36:53
65	Danielle Donegan	22	Ireland	37:01
66	Meliza Estefany Casaico	20	Peru	37:23
67	Lisha van Onselen	27	South Africa	37:58
68	Anneke Arlidge	27	New Zealand	38:13
69	Joan Makary	30	Lebanon	38:33
70	Katherine Camp	32	New Zealand	38:45
71	Caitlin McQuilkin-Bell	26	New Zealand	40:13
72	Chirine Njeim	39	Lebanon	40:42
73	Eliana Silvera Silva	36	Uruguay	40:49
74	Esterina Irino Julius	20	Athlete Refugee Team	41:13
75	Perina Lokure Nakang	21	Athlete Refugee Team	41:48
76	Vanessa Ying Zhuang Lee	26	Singapore	41:59
77	Nathania Tan	22	Northern Mariana Islands	42:13
78	Nada el Kurdi	39	Lebanon	42:15
79	Slađana Perunović	40	Montenegro	43:53
80	Anjali Kumari	24	India	44:02
81	Karine Shraim	38	Lebanon	44:25
82	Jennifer Tomazou	32	Lebanon	45:56
83	Adi Fulori Masau	21	Fiji	49:28
84	Adrianna Skurosz	42	Cook Islands	49:42
	Niamh Brown	24	Great Britain	DNF
	Lauren Heyes	33	Great Britain	DNF
	Tayla Kavanagh	22	South Africa	DNF
	Katie Camarena	26	United States	DNF
	Adi Ama Masau	19	Fiji	DNS
	Loaa Zaarour	31	Lebanon	DNS
	Rajabmo Abdulloeva	19	Tajikistan	DNS

==== Team ====
Rank	Team	Score
1st place, gold medalist(s)	Kenya	10
2nd place, silver medalist(s)	Ethiopia	41
3rd place, bronze medalist(s)	Uganda	44
4	United States	113
5	Spain	126
6	Japan	137
7	South Africa	149
8	Canada	174
9	New Zealand	234
10	ART	234
11	Lebanon	300
