= 2023 World Athletics Cross Country Championships – Mixed relay =

Senior mixed relay race at the 2023 World Athletics Cross Country Championships
- Organisers: World Athletics
- Edition: 44th
- Date: 18 February 2023
- Host city: Bathurst (Australia)
- Events: 1
- Distances: 8 km – Senior mixed relay
- Participation: 60 athletes from 15 nations

The Mixed relay race of the 2023 World Athletics Cross Country Championships was run in Bathurst in New South Wales, Australia on 18 February 2023, with 15 teams of four athletes each, two men and two women, taking part. Each athlete ran a distance of approximately two kilometres before handing off to the next.

== Results ==
The race began at 15:30 local time.

Rank	Nation and competitors	Time	Note
1st place, gold medalist(s)	Kenya: Emmanuel Wanyonyi; Mirriam Cherop; Kyumbe Munguti; Brenda Chebet	23:14	
2nd place, silver medalist(s)	Ethiopia: Adehena Kasaye; Hawi Abera; Getnet Wale; Birke Haylom	23:21	
3rd place, bronze medalist(s)	Australia: Oliver Hoare; Jessica Hull; Stewart McSweyn; Abbey Caldwell	23:26	
4	South Africa: Mafori Ryan Mphahlele; Prudence Sekgodiso; Tshepo Tshite; Caster Semenya	23:50	
5	United States: Alec Basten; Emma Coburn; Jordan Mann; Heather Maclean	24:32	
6	Great Britain: Joseph Wigfield; Alexandra Bell; Callum Elson; Alexandra Millard	24:39	
7	Morocco: Hafid Rizqy; Soukaina Hajji; Abdellatif Sadiki; Ikram Ouaaziz	24:48	
8	Canada: Matthew Beaudet; Kate Current; Perry Mackinnon; Erin Teschuk	24:55	
9	Uganda: Ronald Musagala; Linda Chebet; Abu Mayanja; Knight Aciru	25:06	
10	New Zealand: Sam Tanner; Rebekah Greene; Eric Speakman; Anneke Grogan	25:08	
11	Spain: Adam Maijo; Miriam Costa; Pol Oriach; Rosalía Tárraga	25:14	
12	China: Qinghua Zong; Yingcui Li; Guangyue Ren; Xia Xhou	26:27	
13	Athlete Refugee Team: Seyd Taha Ghafari; Josephine Tain Augustino; Fouad Idbafdil; Anjelina Nadai Lohalith	27:15	
14	Papua New Guinea: Aquila Turalom; Scholastica Herman; Dilu Goiye; Mary Kua	29:42	
15	Fiji: Sailasa Moala; Adi Fulori Masau; Pratik Gounder; Adi Ama Masau	34:27	

== See also ==
- 2017 IAAF World Cross Country Championships – Mixed relay
- 2019 IAAF World Cross Country Championships - Mixed relay
  - Senior men's race
  - Senior women's race
  - Junior men's race
  - Junior women's race
- 2023 World Athletics Cross Country Championships
