= 2022 World Athletics Indoor Championships – Women's 1500 metres =

Women's 1500 metres at the 2022 World Athletics Indoor Championships
- Venue: Štark Arena
- Dates: 18–19 March
- Competitors: 19 from 16 nations
- Winning time: 3:57.19

Medalists
gold medal	Gudaf Tsegay	Ethiopia
silver medal	Axumawit Embaye	Ethiopia
bronze medal	Hirut Meshesha	Ethiopia

The women's 1500 metres at the 2022 World Athletics Indoor Championships took place on 18 and 19 March 2022.

== Results ==
=== Heats ===
Qualification: First 3 in each heat (Q) and the next 3 fastest (q) advance to the Final

The heats were started on 18 March at 12:20.

Rank	Heat	Name	Nationality	Time	Notes
1	1	Axumawit Embaye	Ethiopia	4:04.83	Q
2	2	Hirut Meshesha	Ethiopia	4:05.75	Q
3	1	Winnie Nanyondo	Uganda	4:06.11	Q
4	2	Josette Norris	United States	4:06.27	Q
5	1	Claudia Bobocea	Romania	4:06.66	Q
6	1	Linden Hall	Australia	4:06.69	q, SB
7	3	Gudaf Tsegay	Ethiopia	4:06.71	Q
8	3	Lucia Stafford	Canada	4.07.95	Q
9	3	Sara Kuivisto	Finland	4:08.05	Q
10	3	Heather MacLean	United States	4:08.13	q
11	3	Marta Pérez	Spain	4:10.09	q
12	2	Alma Delia Cortés	Mexico	4:10.95	Q
13	2	Aurore Fleury	France	4:12.20	
14	3	Nozomi Tanaka	Japan	4:12.31	NR
15	2	Sarah Healy	Ireland	4:12.44	
16	1	Erin Wallace	Great Britain	4:12.46	
17	2	Gresa Bakraqi	Kosovo	4:28.40	
18	3	Amina Bakhit	Sudan	4:30.90	SB
19	1	Anjelina Lohalith	ART	4:34.72	SB

=== Final ===
The final was started on 19 March at 20:35

Rank	Name	Nationality	Time	Notes
1st place, gold medalist(s)	Gudaf Tsegay	Ethiopia	3:57.19	CR
2nd place, silver medalist(s)	Axumawit Embaye	Ethiopia	4:02.29	
3rd place, bronze medalist(s)	Hirut Meshesha	Ethiopia	4:03.39	
4	Winnie Nanyondo	Uganda	4:04.60	
5	Josette Norris	United States	4:04.71	
6	Linden Hall	Australia	4:06.34	SB
7	Heather MacLean	United States	4:06.38	
8	Lucia Stafford	Canada	4:06.41	SB
9	Claudia Bobocea	Romania	4:09.64	
10	Marta Pérez	Spain	4:10.23	
11	Sara Kuivisto	Finland	4:12.79	
12	Alma Delia Cortés	Mexico	4:13.71	
