= Caterina Granz =

German middle-distance runner

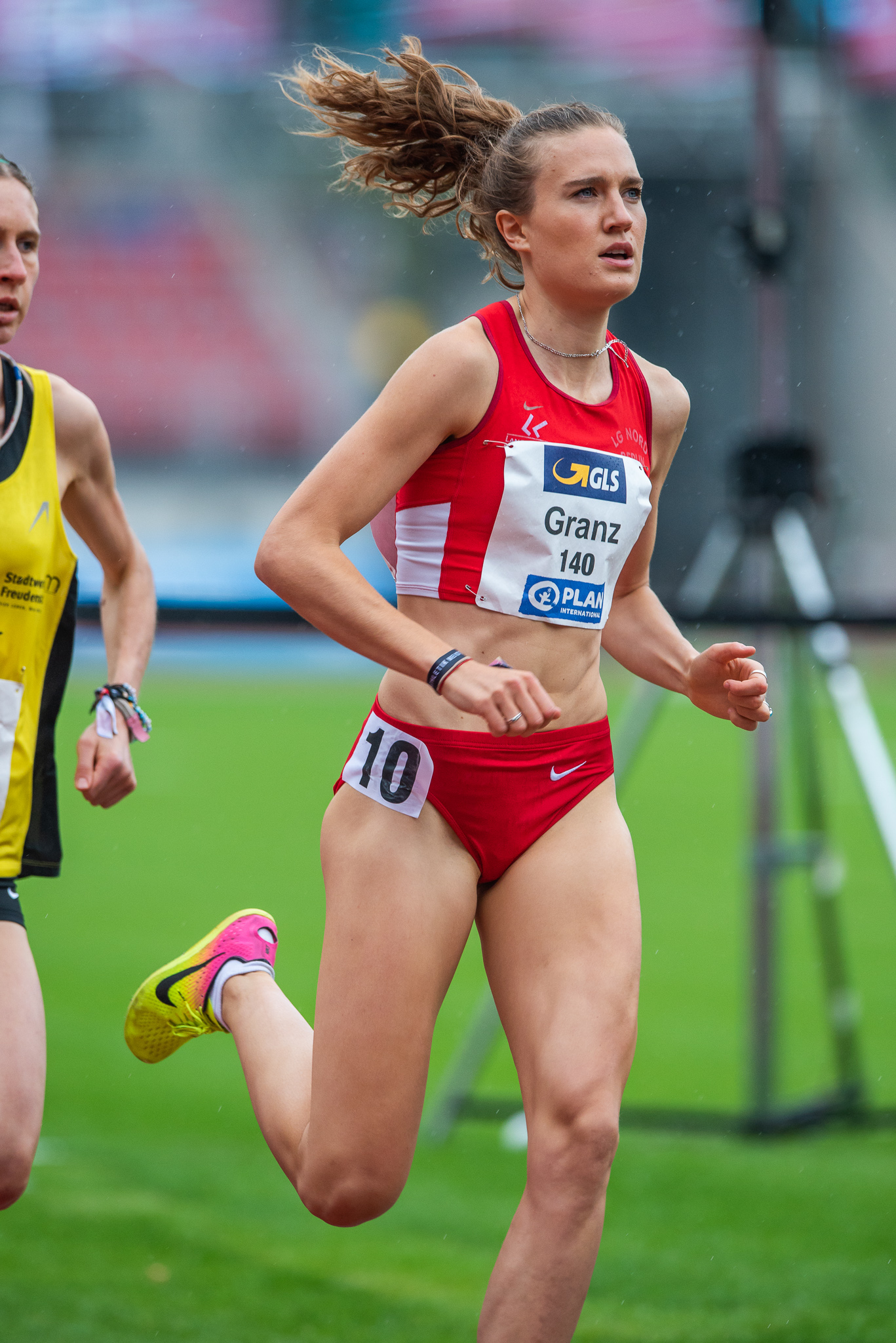
- Caterina Granz in 2018

Personal information
- Born: 14 March 1994 (age 32) Berlin, Germany
- Education: Free University of Berlin
- Height: 1.73 m (5 ft 8 in)
- Weight: 53 kg (117 lb)

Sport
- Sport: Athletics
- Event: 1500 metres
- Club: LG Nord Berlin
- Coached by: Detlef Müller

Caterina Granz (born 14 March 1994 in Berlin) is a German middle-distance runner who specialises in the 1500 metres. She won gold medal at the 2019 Summer Universiade.

== Competition record ==
Year	Competition	Venue	Position	Event	Notes
Representing Germany
2012	World Junior Championships	Barcelona, Spain	16th (h)	1500 m	4:21.25
2018	World Cup	London, United Kingdom	4th	1500 m	4:10.04
2018	European Championships	Berlin, Germany	18th (h)	1500 m	4:11.46
2019	European Indoor Championships	Birmingham, United Kingdom	–	1500 m	DNF
2019	Universiade	Naples, Italy	1st	1500 m	4:09.14
2019	World Championships	Doha, Qatar	31st (h)	1500 m	4:12.36
2021	European Indoor Championships	Toruń, Poland	14th (h)	1500 m	4:13.53
2021	Olympic Games	Tokyo, Japan	25th (sf)	1500 m	4:10.93

== Personal bests ==
Outdoor

- 800 metres – 2:03.46 (Metz 2019)
- 1500 metres – 4:07.77 (Lahti 2019)
- 3000 metres – 9:13.02 (Kiel 2016)
- 5000 metres – 15:46.64 (Nijmegen 2018)
- 5 kilometres – 17:02 (Bolzano 2017)
- 10 kilometres – 34:02 (Berlin 2017)

Indoor

- 800 metres – 2:10.66 (Berlin 2014)
- 1500 metres – 4:11.38 (Linz 2019)
- 3000 metres – 8:56.29 (Dortmund 2018)
