= Kate Current =

Canadian athlete (born 1998)

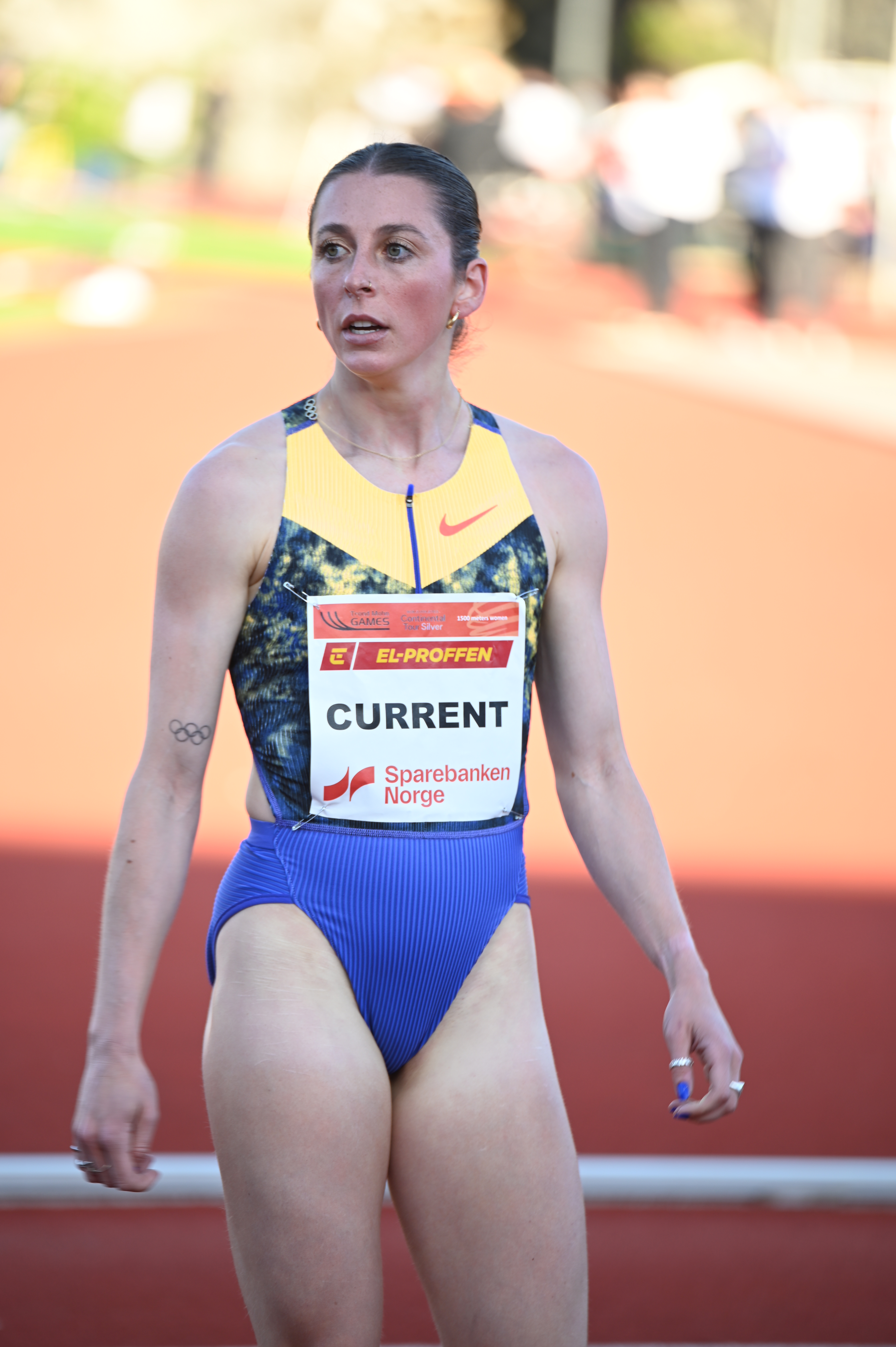

Personal information
- Nationality: Canada
- Born: February 16, 1998 (age 28) Cobourg, Ontario

Sport
- Sport: Athletics
- Event: 1500m

Achievements and titles
- Personal bests: 1500m: 4:02.79 (Budapest, 2025)

Kate Current (born February 16, 1998) is a Canadian middle-distance runner. She represents Canada at international competitions, including at the 2023 World Athletics Championships, 2023 Pan American Games, 2023 World Athletics Cross Country Championships, 2024 Olympic Games, 2025 World Athletics Championships, 2026 World Athletics Cross Country Championships, 2026 Commonwealth Games

== Early life ==
Current was born and raised in Cobourg, Ontario where she attended Cobourg Collegiate Institute before pursuing a degree in Civil Engineering from Western University.

== Education ==
Current attended Western University, where she received a degree in Civil Engineering and a Masters in Civil Engineering. She was a three-time recipient of the D.C Buck Engineering Award, for "leadership in extra-curricular activities".

In 2022, she was awarded the Alan G. Davenport Memorial Scholarship, based on academic achievement and contributions to the wind engineering community.

In 2022, she was also the recipient of the Governor General's Academic All-Canadian Award for 2021-2022.

== Athletic career ==
Current was the 2022 USports women's 1500m and 3000m champion as a member of the Western Mustangs. During her career at Western, she was the recipient of the schools 2019-2020 and 2021-2022 Athlete of the Year award as well as being the recipient of the schools 2020-2021 top athletics award, the F.W.P. Jones Trophy.

In 2023 Current competed in the women's 1500 metres event at the 2023 World Athletics Championship held in Budapest, Hungary running a 4-second personal best of 4:07.23. In 2023 she also competed in the 2023 World Athletics Cross Country Championships as a member of Canada's team in the Mixed relay event finishing 8th. Current also represented Canada at the 2023 Pan American Games in Santiago, Chile, where she competed in the 1500m and finished 7th overall.

In 2024 Current came second at the Canadian Track and Field Championships in the womens 1500m. This result helped her achieve the goal of becoming a Olympian. She competed at the 2024 Paris Olympics in the women's 1500m, representing Canada. Kate also lowered her 1500m personal best to 4:06.91 at the La Classique d'athlétisme de Montréal in Montreal Canada.

2025 was the best year of Current's career thus far. She began her outdoor season with a personal best in the mile at the Drake Relays, running 4:26.27 She followed up that mile result by lowering her 1500m personal best to 4:03.06 at the Czesław Cybulski Memorial track meet in Poznan Poland before lowering her personal best again to 4:02.79 at the Gyulai István Memorial - Hungarian Athletics Grand Prix in Budapest Hungary. Current finished third in the Canadian Track and Field Championships placing her on the podium for the second year in a row, which helped her qualify for the 2025 World Championships in Tokyo Japan, the second World Athletics Track and Field Championships of her career. She finished tenth in her heat.
