= 2022 World Athletics U20 Championships – Women's 1500 metres =

Women's 1500 metres at the 2022 World Athletics U20 Championships
- Venue: Estadio Olímpico Pascual Guerrero
- Dates: 4 August (round 1); 6 August (final)
- Competitors: 41 from 27 nations
- Winning time: 4:04.64 CR

Medalists
gold medal	Brenda Chebet	Kenya
silver medal	Purity Chepkirui	Kenya
bronze medal	Mebriht Mekonen	Ethiopia

The women's 1500 metres at the 2022 World Athletics U20 Championships was held at the Estadio Olímpico Pascual Guerrero in Cali, Colombia from 1 to 4 August 2022.

== Records ==
U20 standing records prior to the 2022 World Athletics U20 Championships were as follows:

Record	Athlete & Nationality	Mark	Location	Date
World U20 Record	Lang Yinglai (CHN)	3:51.34	Shanghai, China	18 October 1997
Championship Record	Faith Kipyegon (KEN)	4:04.96	Barcelona, Spain	15 July 2012
World U20 Leading	Mebriht Mekonen (ETH)	4:03.29	Ostrava, Czech Republic	31 May 2022

== Results ==
=== Round 1 ===
Round 1 took place on 1 August, with the 41 athletes involved being split into 3 heats, 2 heats of 14 athletes and 1 of 13. The first 3 athletes in each heat ( Q ) and the next 3 fastest ( q ) qualified to the semi-final. The overall results were as follows:

Rank	Heat	Name	Nationality	Time	Note
1	3	Brenda Chebet	Kenya	4:12.20	Q
2	3	Dilek Koçak	Turkey	4:14.90	Q, PB
3	3	Yuya Sawada	Japan	4:15.29	Q, PB
4	3	Ingeborg Østgård	Norway	4:16.36	q
5	2	Birke Haylom	Ethiopia	4:18.06	Q
6	2	Ilona Mononen	Finland	4:18.40	Q
7	2	Mia Barnett	United States	4:18.51	Q
8	2	Mireya Arnedillo	Spain	4:18.66	q
9	1	Mebriht Mekonen	Ethiopia	4:18.97	Q
10	1	Addison Wiley	United States	4:19.39	Q
11	1	Purity Chepkirui	Kenya	4:19.94	Q
12	1	Danielle Verster	South Africa	4:21.45	q
13	3	Sabrina Salcedo García	Mexico	4:21.48	PB
14	1	Ina Halle Haugen	Norway	4:22.21	
15	3	Lilly Nägeli	Switzerland	4:22.64	
16	1	Ulyana Rachynska	Ukraine	4:26.67	
17	2	María López	Mexico	4:27.10	PB
18	2	Naledi Makgatha	South Africa	4:27.11	
19	2	Azumi Nagira	Japan	4:27.81	
20	3	Rita Figueiredo	Portugal	4:28.06	
21	3	Nicola Hogg	Australia	4:28.43	
22	1	Sanae Hasnaoui	Morocco	4:28.95	
23	1	Nel Vanopstal	Belgium	4:28.98	
24	2	Roukia Mouici	Algeria	4:29.06	
25	3	Fatima Aafir	Morocco	4:29.17	
26	3	Anita Poma	Peru	4:29.50	
27	2	Tetiana Chornovol	Ukraine	4:30.23	
28	1	Carmen Alder Caisalitin	Ecuador	4:31.16	
29	2	Saga Provci	Sweden	4:31.47	
30	3	Akbayan Nurmamet	Kazakhstan	4:33.73	
31	1	Katelyn Stewart-Barnett	Canada	4:34.08	
32	1	Eya Ouerghi	Tunisia	4:35.16	
33	3	Veronica Vicente José	Mozambique	4:35.47	
34	3	Madalina Elena Sirbu	Romania	4:35.55	
35	1	Mélissa Girardin	Switzerland	4:36.70	
36	2	Lea Haler	Slovenia	4:36.83	
37	2	Chloe Coutts	Canada	4:37.35	
38	1	Lucinda Rourke	Australia	4:39.10	
39	1	María José Gelvez	Colombia	4:39.50	
40	3	Marie Bilo	Belgium	4:39.79	
	2	Maria-Talida Sfarghiu	Romania		DNF

=== Final ===
The final was started at 16:00 on 6 August. The results were as follows:

Rank	Name	Nationality	Time	Note
1st place, gold medalist(s)	Brenda Chebet	Kenya	4:04.64	CR, PB
2nd place, silver medalist(s)	Purity Chepkirui	Kenya	4:07.64	PB
3rd place, bronze medalist(s)	Mebriht Mekonen	Ethiopia	4:08.39	
4	Addison Wiley	United States	4:11.43	PB
5	Yuya Sawada	Japan	4:12.87	PB
6	Ingeborg Østgård	Norway	4:13.85	
7	Ilona Mononen	Finland	4:16.19	
8	Danielle Verster	Australia	4:16.36	
9	Mireya Arnedillo	Spain	4:20.55	
10	Mia Barnett	United States	4:22.37	
11	Dilek Koçak	Turkey	4:24.50	
DSQ	Birke Haylom	Ethiopia	~~4:04.27~~	DQ
