= Josette Andrews =

American middle-distance runner

- Andrews in 2025

Personal information
- Born: Josette Norris; December 15, 1995 (age 30)
- Height: 5 ft 8 in (173 cm)

Sport
- Country: United States
- Events: 1500 metres, 5000 metres
- College team: North Carolina Tar Heels; Georgetown Hoyas
- Club: On Athletics Club

Achievements and titles
- Personal bests: 1500 m: 3:59.72; 5000 m: 14:25.37

Josette Andrews (née Norris; born December 15, 1995) is an American middle to long-distance runner.

Raised in Tenafly, New Jersey, Norris graduated from Tenafly High School in 2014, where she won the Meet of Champions in the 1,600 meters event during her junior season.

== NCAA championships ==
She competed for the North Carolina Tar Heels and Georgetown Hoyas. She competed at the NCAA Women's Division I Outdoor Track and Field Championships in Austin, Texas and placed fourth in the 5000m final.

=== Outdoor track and field ===
| Year | Competition | Venue | Position | Event | Notes |
Representing Georgetown Hoyas
| 2019 | NCAA Outdoor Track and Field Championships | Austin, Texas | 4th | 5000 m | 15:52.05 |

== Professional ==
Norris chose to focus on the 5000m event in the 2020 US Olympic Trials, making it to the final but placing 8th and failing to make the Olympic team. Despite this disappointment, she attended the Sound Running Sunset Tour in Mission Viejo, California and ran a time under 4 minutes to set her personal best in the 1500m. Following the closure of the 2020 Olympic Games she attended two Diamond League events, Prefontaine Classic and Lausanne Athletissima, competing instead in the 1500m and placing 3rd in both. Having qualified for the Diamond League Final in Zürich, she attended to compete in the 1500m and earned a bronze medal there as well.

== Personal life ==
Andrews is married to professional runner and Olympian, Robby Andrews.

== Competition record ==
=== USA National Championships ===
==== Track and Field ====
| Year | Competition | Venue | Position | Event | Notes |
|---|---|---|---|---|---|
| 2021 | US Olympic Trials | Eugene, Oregon | 8th | 5000 m | 15:48.70 |
| 2022 | USATF Indoor Championships | Spokane, Washington | 2nd | 1500 m | 4:06.13 |
| 2022 | USATF Outdoor Championships | Eugene, Oregon | 12th | 5000 m | 16:06.83 |
| 2023 | USATF Outdoor Championships | Eugene, Oregon | 4th | 5000 m | 15:01.80 |
| 2024 | USATF Indoor Championships | Albuquerque, New Mexico | 2nd | 3000 m | 9:03.10 |
| 2024 | USA Olympic Trials | Eugene, Oregon | 11th | 5000m | 15:26.25 |
| 2025 | USATF Outdoor Championships | Eugene, Oregon | 3rd | 5000 m | 15:15.01 |

=== International Competitions ===
==== Track and Field ====
| Year | Competition | Venue | Position | Event | Notes |
|---|---|---|---|---|---|
| 2021 | Prefontaine Classic | Eugene, Oregon | 3rd | 1500 m | 4:00.07 |
| 2021 | Lausanne Athletissima | Lausanne, Switzerland | 3rd | 1500 m | 4:03.27 |
| 2021 | Zürich Diamond League Final | Zürich, Switzerland | 3rd | 1500 m | 4:00.41 |
| 2022 | World Indoor Championships | Belgrade, Serbia | 5th | 1500 m | 4:04.71 |
| 2024 | World Indoor Championships | Glasgow, United Kingdom | 11th | 3000 m | 8:41.93 |

=== Circuit performances ===
Grand Slam Track results
| Slam | Race group | Event | Pl. | Time | Prize money |
|---|---|---|---|---|---|
| 2025 Philadelphia Slam | Long distance | 3000 m | 3rd | 8:44.70 | US$15,000 |
