= Athletics at the 2019 Summer Universiade – Women's 1500 metres =

The women's 1500 metres event at the 2019 Summer Universiade was held on 11 and 13 July at the Stadio San Paolo in Naples.

== Medalists ==
| Gold | Silver | Bronze |
|---|---|---|
| Caterina Granz; Germany | Georgia Griffith; Australia | Courtney Hufsmith; Canada |

== Results ==
=== Heats ===
Qualification: First 4 in each heat (Q) and next 4 fastest (q) qualified for the final.

| Rank | Heat | Name | Nationality | Time | Notes |
|---|---|---|---|---|---|
| 1 | 1 | Caterina Granz | Germany | 4:19.15 | Q |
| 2 | 1 | Lucia Stafford | Canada | 4:19.89 | Q |
| 3 | 1 | Carina Viljoen | South Africa | 4:20.18 | Q |
| 4 | 2 | Georgia Griffith | Australia | 4:20.76 | Q |
| 5 | 1 | Dani Chattenton | Great Britain | 4:21.00 | Q |
| 6 | 2 | María Pía Fernández | Uruguay | 4:21.04 | Q |
| 7 | 2 | Courtney Hufsmith | Canada | 4:21.38 | Q |
| 8 | 2 | Vera Hoffmann | Luxembourg | 4:21.64 | Q |
| 9 | 1 | Linn Soderholm | Sweden | 4:22.44 | q |
| 10 | 1 | Georgia Hansen | Australia | 4:23.23 | q |
| 11 | 2 | Durga Pramod Deore | India | 4:24.21 | q, PB |
| 12 | 2 | Rachel Pocratsky | United States | 4:25.43 | q |
| 13 | 1 | Harmilan Bains | India | 4:26.50 | |
| 14 | 2 | Lenuta Petronela Simiuc | Romania | 4:27.36 | |
| 15 | 1 | Silviya Georgieva | Bulgaria | 4:28.15 | |
| 16 | 1 | Josefine Rytter | Denmark | 4:28.81 | PB |
| 17 | 2 | Line Schulz | Denmark | 4:29.57 | |
| 18 | 1 | Danielle De Castro | United States | 4:32.16 | |
| 19 | 1 | Jeniffer Nyakato | Uganda | 4:34.01 | |
| 20 | 2 | Urška Arzenšek | Slovenia | 4:37.58 | PB |
| | 2 | Docus Ajok | Uganda | DQ | R142.4a |
| | 2 | Eyerusalem Ayalew | Ethiopia | DNS | |

=== Final ===
| Rank | Name | Nationality | Time | Notes |
|---|---|---|---|---|
| 1st place, gold medalist(s) | Caterina Granz | Germany | 4:09.14 | SB |
| 2nd place, silver medalist(s) | Georgia Griffith | Australia | 4:09.89 | |
| 3rd place, bronze medalist(s) | Courtney Hufsmith | Canada | 4:11.81 | PB |
| 4 | María Pía Fernández | Uruguay | 4:12.62 | SB |
| 5 | Lucia Stafford | Canada | 4:12.70 | |
| 6 | Carina Viljoen | South Africa | 4:14.70 | |
| 7 | Vera Hoffmann | Luxembourg | 4:15.81 | PB |
| 8 | Dani Chattenton | Great Britain | 4:16.32 | |
| 9 | Linn Soderholm | Sweden | 4:21.40 | |
| 10 | Georgia Hansen | Australia | 4:21.89 | |
| 11 | Durga Pramod Deore | India | 4:29.91 | |
| | Rachel Pocratsky | United States | DNS | |
