= Athlete Refugee Team at the 2017 World Championships in Athletics =

- Flag of the IAAF
- WA code: ART

in London, United Kingdom 4–13 August 2017
- Competitors: 5 (3 men and 2 women) in 5 events
- Medals: Gold 0 Silver 0 Bronze 0 Total 0

World Championships in Athletics appearances
- 2017; 2019; 2022; 2023; 2025

The Athlete Refugee Team competed at the 2017 World Championships in Athletics held in London, United Kingdom, from 4 to 13 August 2017. The team, representing displaced athletes under the banner of the International Association of Athletics Federations (IAAF), participated independently without representing any specific nation.

== Results ==
=== Men ===
Track and road events

Athlete	Event	Heat		Semifinal		Final	
Athlete	Event	Result	Rank	Result	Rank	Result	Rank
Ahmed Bashir Farah	800 metres	1:50.04 PB	40	Did not advance			
Dominic Lokinyomo Lobalu	1500 metres	3:52.78 PB	40	Did not advance			
Kadar Omar Abdullahi	5000 metres	14:32.67 PB	35	—		Did not advance	

=== Women ===
Track and road events

Athlete	Event	Heat		Semifinal		Final	
Athlete	Event	Result	Rank	Result	Rank	Result	Rank
Rose Lokonyen	800 metres	2:20.06 SB	45	Did not advance			
Angelina Nadi	1500 metres	4:33.54 PB	43	Did not advance			

== See also ==
- Independent Paralympic Athletes at the 2016 Summer Paralympics
- Refugee Olympic Team at the 2016 Summer Olympics
