= Winny Chebet =

Kenyan middle-distance runner

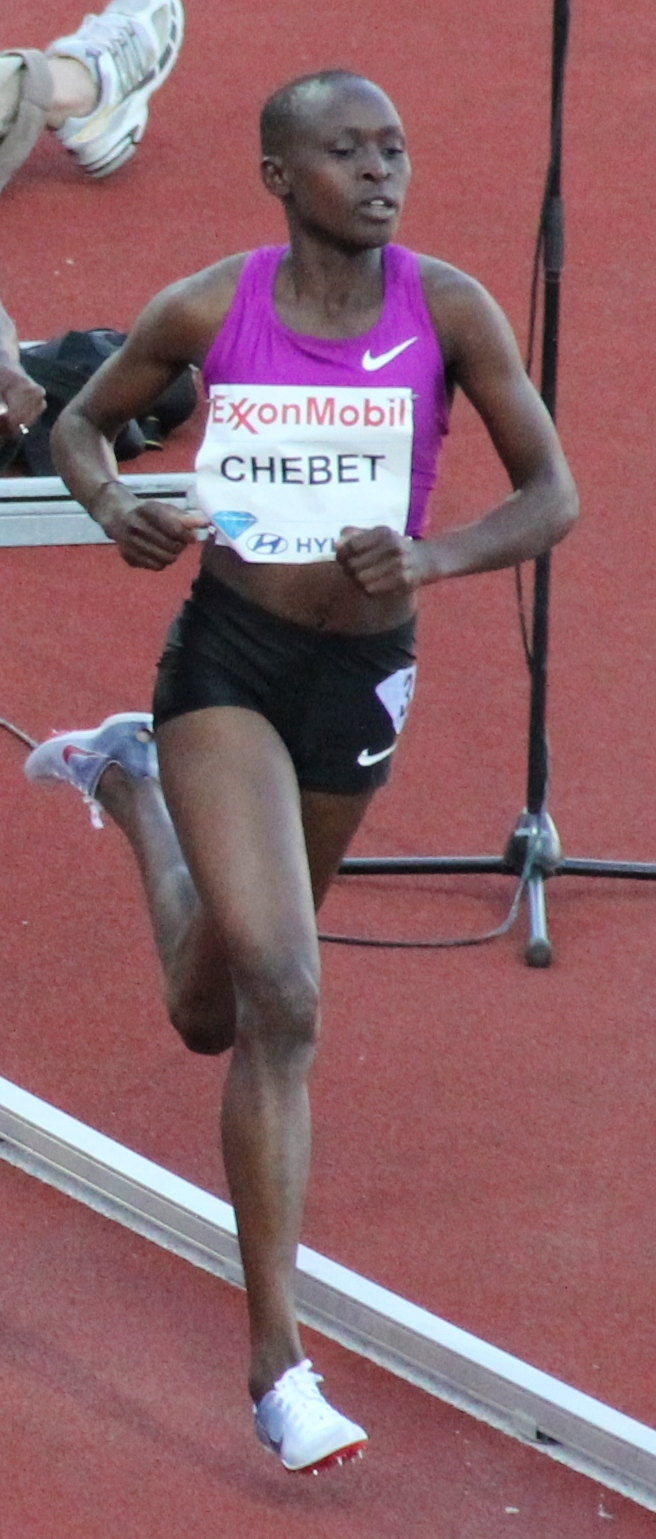
- Winny Chebet in 2010

Personal information
- Nationality: Kenya
- Born: 20 December 1990 (age 35) Buret, Kenya
- Height: 1.70 m (5 ft 7 in)
- Weight: 49 kg (108 lb)

Sport
- Sport: Athletics
- Events: 800 m, 1500 m
- Coached by: Bernard Ouma
Medal record
Women's athletics
Representing Kenya
African Games
| Bronze medal – third place | 2015 Brazzaville | 4x400 m |
African Championships
| Gold medal – first place | 2018 Asaba | 1500 m |
| Gold medal – first place | 2022 Saint Pierre | 1500 m |
Continental Cup
| Gold medal – first place | 2018 Ostrava | 1500 m |

Winny Chebet (born 20 December 1990) is a Kenyan middle-distance runner competing primarily in the 800 metres. She represented her country at the 2013 World Championships reaching the semifinals. In addition she won silver medals at the 2006 World Junior Championships and 2005 World Youth Championships.

Her personal best in the 800 metres is 1:59.30 from 2013.

She qualified to represent Kenya at the 2020 Summer Olympics.

== Competition record ==
| Year | Competition | Venue | Position | Event | Notes |
Representing Kenya
| 2005 | World Youth Championships | Marrakesh, Morocco | 2nd | 800 m | 2:08.15 |
| 2006 | World Junior Championships | Beijing, China | 2nd | 800 m | 2:04.59 |
| 2007 | World Youth Championships | Ostrava, Czech Republic | 1st (sf) | 800 m | 2:04.10 |
| 2008 | World Junior Championships | Bydgoszcz, Poland | 5th | 800 m | 2:04.13 |
| 2009 | African Junior Championships | Bambous, Mauritius | 2nd | 800 m | 2:01.36 |
| 2009 | African Junior Championships | Bambous, Mauritius | 1st | 4 × 400 m relay | 3:48.99 |
| 2010 | African Championships | Nairobi, Kenya | 5th | 800 m | 2:03.02 |
| 2010 | Commonwealth Games | Delhi, India | 7th | 800 m | 2:11.58 |
| 2013 | World Championships | Moscow, Russia | 12th (sf) | 800 m | 2:01.04 |
| 2015 | African Games | Brazzaville, Republic of the Congo | 5th | 800 m | 2:02.67 |
| 2015 | African Games | Brazzaville, Republic of the Congo | 3rd | 4 × 400 m relay | 3:35.91 |
| 2016 | Olympic Games | Rio de Janeiro, Brazil | 21st (sf) | 800 m | 2:01.90 |
| 2017 | World Championships | London, United Kingdom | 15th (sf) | 1500 m | 4:06.29 |
| 2018 | World Indoor Championship | Birmingham, United Kingdom | 14th (h) | 800 m | 2:18.31 |
| 2018 | World Indoor Championship | Birmingham, United Kingdom | 5th | 1500 m | 4:12.08 |
| 2018 | Commonwealth Games | Gold Coast, Australia | 18th (h) | 1500 m | 4:20.67 |
| 2018 | African Championships | Asaba, Nigeria | 1st | 1500 m | 4:14.02 |
| 2019 | World Championships | Doha, Qatar | 7th | 1500 m | 3:58.20 |
| 2021 | Olympic Games | Tokyo, Japan | 26th (sf) | 1500 m | 4:11.62 |
| 2022 | African Championships | Port Louis, Mauritius | 1st | 1500 m | 4:16.10 |
| 2022 | World Championships | Eugene, United States | 13th | 1500 m | 4:15.13 |

== Personal bests ==
Outdoor

- 800 metres – 1:58.13 (Zagreb 2017)
- 1000 metres – 2:35.73 (Brussels 2013)
- 1500 metres – 3:58.20 (Doha 2019)
- One mile – 4:19.55 (London 2017)

Indoor

- 800 metres – 2:02.67 (Val-de-Reuil 2013)
- 1000 metres – 2:40.37 (Moscow 2013)
- 1500 metres – 4:05.81 (Birmingham 2018)
- One mile – 4:34.06 (Birmingham 2019)
