= Valentina Rosamilia =

Swiss athlete (born 2003)

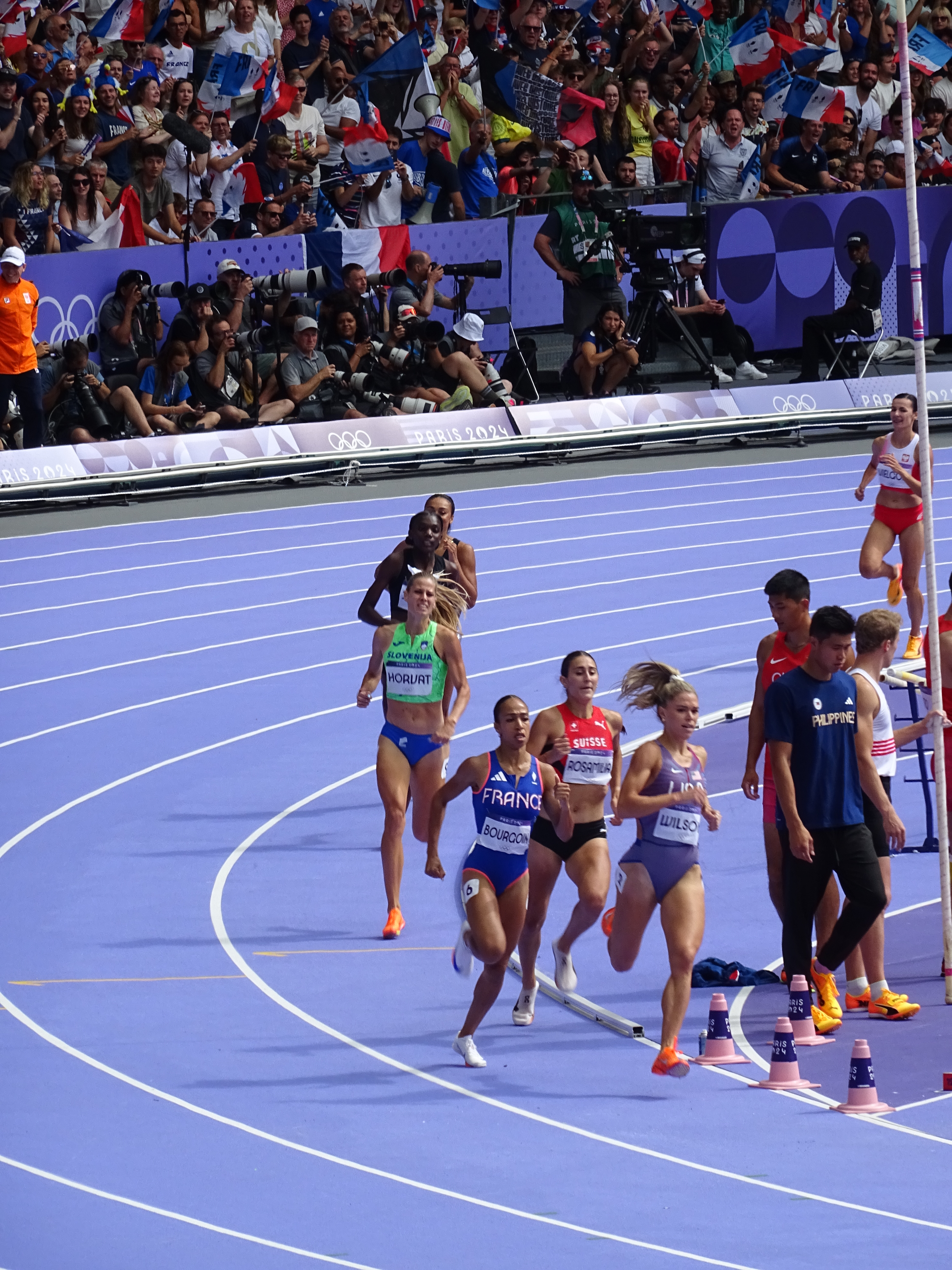
- Competing at the 2024 Olympic Games

Personal information
- Nationality: Swiss
- Born: 27 January 2003 (age 23)

Sport
- Sport: Athletics
- Event: Middle distance

Achievements and titles
- Personal bests: 800 m: 1:58.16 (Birmingham, 2026); Indoor; 800 m: 1:59.81 (St Gallen, 2026)
Medal record
Women's athletics
Representing Switzerland
World U20 Championships
Silver medal – second place	2021 Nairobi	800 m
European U20 Championships
Bronze medal – third place	2021 Tallinn	800 m

Valentina Rosamilia (born 27 January 2003) is a Swiss middle-distance runner. She competed at the 2024 Olympic Games.

== Biography ==
She is a member of BTV Aarau athletics club. She won Swiss junior indoor titles over 400 metres and 1500 metres in 2019. In July 2019 she won silver in the 800 metres at the European Youth Olympic Festival in Baku. At the same event she won a bronze in the medley relay. In February 2020, she retained her Swiss junior indoor titles over 400 metres and 1500 metres.

In July 2021, she won the bronze medal in the 800 metres at the 2021 European Athletics U20 Championships in Tallinn, Estonia. In August 2021, she was a silver medalist at the 2021 World Athletics U20 Championships in Nairobi, Kenya over 800 metres.

In March 2023, she competed at the 2023 European Athletics Indoor Championships in Istanbul, Turkey. She set a new personal best of 2:00.98 in qualifying for the semi final of the 800 metres at the 2024 European Athletics Championships in Rome. She ran a lifetime best of 1:58.69 in finishing third in Winterthur at the Swiss Athletics Championships in June 2024. She competed in the 800 metres at the 2024 Summer Olympics in Paris in August 2024, where she reached the semi-finals.

She was considered for a place on the Swiss team for the 2025 World Athletics Championships in Tokyo, Japan but had to withdraw for health reasons.

After returning to fitness she opened 2026 with an indoor personal best of 2:00.78 for the 800 metres in Ostrava on 3 February 2026, before lowering it again to 1:59.90 finishing runner-up to Femke Bol in Metz on 6 February. She was second to Audrey Werro at the Swiss Indoor Championships over 800 metres on 1 March 2026, running 1:59.81 in the final. Rosamilia reached the semi-finals of the 800 m at the 2026 World Athletics Indoor Championships in Toruń, Poland. In May, she competed in Poland again and ran the 800 metres in 2:00.73 to win at the Irena Szewińska Memorial. Competing at the European Championships in August, in Birmingham, England, she was a finalist in the 800 metres, having ran a personal best of 1:58.16 in the semi-final, prior to placing seventh overall in the final. Competing in the Diamond League at the 2026 Athletissima in Lausanne, Switzerland on 21 August 2026, she placed fifth with 1:58.93. In September, she placed fifth over 800 m at the inaugural World Ultimate Championship in Budapest. On 18 September, she finished runner-up to Keely Hodgkinson in the 800 m at Athlos in London, in 1:58.75.

== Personal life ==
She is from Hunzenschwil in the canton of Aargau. In 2024, she was accepted as a member of the Swiss military, having been selected from a wider pool of volunteers for a four-year period service. She had to delay the commencement of her time in the military after being selected for the 2024 Olympic Games.
