= Bertukan Welde =

Ethiopian long-distance runner (born 2004)

Personal information
- Nationality: Ethiopia
- Born: Bertukan Welde Sura; 10 May 2004 (age 22)

Sport
- Sport: Athletics
- Events: 3000 metres 5000 metres

Achievements and titles
- Personal bests: 3000m: 8:59.10 (Doha, 2022); 5000m: 15:42.5h (Hawassa, 2023); Half marathon: 1:07.44 (Herzogenaurach, 2023)
Medal record
Women's athletics
Representing Ethiopia
World Marathon Majors
Silver medal – second place	2026 Tokyo	Marathon
World Cross Country Championships
Silver medal – second place	2024 Belgrade	Senior team

Bertukan Welde Sura (born 10 May 2004) is an Ethiopian track and field athlete who competes as a long-distance runner.

== Career ==
In May 2022, Welde set a personal best time of 8:59.10 for 3000 metres, recorded at the Diamond League meeting in Doha. Welde finished fourth in the 3000 metres at the 2022 World Athletics U20 Championships in Cali, Colombia, in a time of 9:18.20.

In April 2023, aged 18 years-old, she won the women's half marathon in Herzogenaurach, in a time of 1:07.44. It was her debut at the distance. In May 2023, she finished third at the Okpekpe Road Race in Nigeria.

In February 2024, she won the Riyadh Half Marathon in a time of 1:10.24.

She finished in eighth place at the 2024 World Athletics Cross Country Championships in Belgrade in the senior women's race, winning silver as part of the Ethiopian team.

Welde won the Prague Marathon in May 2025 in a time of 2:20:55.
