= Athlete Refugee Team =

Sporting event delegation

The current flag / logo of the ART in use since the 2022 World Indoor Championships.

The flag / logo of the ART at the 2019 World Athletics Championships in Doha, Qatar.

The flag / logo of the IAAF since the 2019 World Athletics Championships

The Athlete Refugee Team (ART) is a delegation under which refugee athletes can compete collectively at IAAF (International Association of Athletics Federations, now known as World Athletics) competitions. The official IAAF logo was used as the team's flag until 2019. World Athletics collaborated with Kenyan long-distance runner Tegla Loroupe to form the team in 2014 as a short-term response to the growing refugee crisis that left millions of people dislocated or stateless. However, it has since turned into a sort of permanent feature at World Athletics events due to the refugee crisis only worsening. Many of the athletes (who fled war or violence in their home countries) originate from a variety of nations such as: Sudan, South Sudan, Democratic Republic of the Congo, Syria, and Ethiopia. They include a majority of runners, as well as professional swimmers, material artists, etc.

World Athletics helps by providing support to Loroupe as she works with the refugees in Ngong, Kenya on behalf of her foundation (the Tegla Loroupe Peace Foundation). Loroupe finds young, aspiring recruits at local running events and carefully selects them to be on the Athlete Refugee Team. The fastest ones are invited to the Tegla Loroupe Peace Foundation's training camp where they receive coaching from Loroupe and further develop their skills so that they may be prepared for the highest and most prestigious levels of competition like the Olympic Games.

The Athlete Refugee Team's first appearance was at the 2016 Summer Olympics in Rio de Janeiro, Brazil. Ever since their introduction, they have competed at every World Athletics Series including: the 2017 World Championships in Athletics, 2017 IAAF World Relays, 2018 IAAF World U20 Championships, and 2019 World Athletics Championships, among other events. One athlete (Puok Thiep Gatkuoth in men's marathon) was announced to compete at the 2018 European Athletics Championships, but did not start.

Over time, as the Athlete Refugee Team has grown, so has the funding for the programme behind it. World Athletics decided to expand the reach of the Athlete Refugee Team to several other locations throughout the globe, with athletes based not just in Kenya but: Germany, Israel, France, Switzerland, and the United Kingdom. Additionally, the organisation commits to financially sustaining and investing in the programme by continually seeking out coaches and competitive opportunities for the athletes.

== Competition history ==
=== Olympic Games ===
- Athletes were represented under the label of Refugee Olympic Team (ROT) during the 2016 Summer Olympics, which later changed to the French version of Équipe olympique des réfugiés (EOR) during the 2020 Summer Olympics. They compete under the Olympic flag at the Games.

Competition	Host city	Athlete	Event	Finished	
Competition	Host city	Athlete	Event	Result	Rank
2016 Summer Olympics	Rio de Janeiro, Brazil	James Chiengjiek	Men's 400 m	52.89	8th (h)
2016 Summer Olympics	Rio de Janeiro, Brazil	Yiech Biel	Men's 800 m	1:54.67	8th (h)
2016 Summer Olympics	Rio de Janeiro, Brazil	Paulo Amotun Lokoro	Men's 1500 m	4:03.96	11th (h)
2016 Summer Olympics	Rio de Janeiro, Brazil	Yonas Kinde	Men's marathon	2:24:08	90th
2016 Summer Olympics	Rio de Janeiro, Brazil	Rose Lokonyen	Women's 800 m	2:16.64	7th (h)
2016 Summer Olympics	Rio de Janeiro, Brazil	Anjelina Lohalith	Women's 1500 m	4:47.38	14th (h)
2020 Summer Olympics	Tokyo, Japan	Dorian Keletela	Men's 100 m	10.41	8th (h)
2020 Summer Olympics	Tokyo, Japan	James Chiengjiek	Men's 800 m	2:02.04	8th (h)
2020 Summer Olympics	Tokyo, Japan	Paulo Amotun Lokoro	Men's 1500 m	3:51.78	13th (h)
2020 Summer Olympics	Tokyo, Japan	Jamal Abdelmaji Eisa Mohammed	Men's 5000 m	13:42.98	13th (h)
2020 Summer Olympics	Tokyo, Japan	Rose Lokonyen	Women's 800 m	2:11.87	8th (h)
2020 Summer Olympics	Tokyo, Japan	Anjelina Lohalith	Women's 1500 m	4:31.65	14th (h)
2020 Summer Olympics	Sapporo, Japan	Tachlowini Gabriyesos	Men's marathon	2:14:02	16th
2024 Summer Olympics	Paris, France	Dorian Keletela	Men's 100 m	10.58	8th (h)
2024 Summer Olympics	Paris, France	Musa Suliman	Men's 800 m	1:49.61	9th (h)
2024 Summer Olympics	Paris, France	Dominic Lobalu	Men's 5000 m	13:15.27	4th
2024 Summer Olympics	Paris, France	Jamal Abdelmaji Eisa Mohammed	Men's 10,000 m	27:35.92	18th
2024 Summer Olympics	Paris, France	Tachlowini Gabriyesos	Men's marathon	2:12:47	42nd
2024 Summer Olympics	Paris, France	Mohammad Amin Alsalami	Men's Long jump	7.24	29th (q)
2024 Summer Olympics	Paris, France	Perina Lokure	Women's 800 m	2:08.20	8th (h)
2024 Summer Olympics	Paris, France	Farida Abaroge	Women's 1500 m	4:29.27	14th (h)

=== World Championships ===
Competition	Host City	Athlete	Event	Finished	
Competition	Host City	Athlete	Event	Result	Rank
2017 World Championships	London, United Kingdom	Ahmed Bashir Farah	Men's 800 m	1:50.04 PB	8 (h)
2017 World Championships	London, United Kingdom	Dominic Lokinyomo Lobalu	Men's 1500 m	3:52.78 PB	12 (h)
2017 World Championships	London, United Kingdom	Kadar Omar Abdullahi	Men's 5000 m	14:32.67 PB	17 (h)
2017 World Championships	London, United Kingdom	Rose Lokonyen	Women's 800 m	2:20.06 SB	8 (h)
2017 World Championships	London, United Kingdom	Anjelina Lohalith	Women's 1500 m	4:33.54 PB	15 (h)
2019 World Championships	Doha, Qatar	Paulo Amotun Lokoro	Men's 1500 m	3:48.98	14 (h)
2019 World Championships	Doha, Qatar	Jamal Abdelmaji Eisa Mohammed	Men's 5000 m	14:15.32	17 (h)
2019 World Championships	Doha, Qatar	Tachlowini Gabriyesos	Men's 5000 m	14:28.11	16 (h)
2019 World Championships	Doha, Qatar	Fouad Idbafdil	Men's 3000 m steeplechase	DNF (h)	
2019 World Championships	Doha, Qatar	Otmane Nait Hammou	Men's 3000 m steeplechase	9:30.17	15 (h)
2019 World Championships	Doha, Qatar	Rose Lokonyen	Women's 800 m	2:13.39 PB	7 (h)
2022 World Championships	Eugene, United States	Dorian Keletela	Men's 100 m	10.52	8 (h)
2022 World Championships	Eugene, United States	Jamal Abdelmaji Eisa Mohammed	Men's 5000 m	14:02.79	21 (h)
2022 World Championships	Eugene, United States	Anjelina Lohalith	Women's 1500 m	4:23.84 PB	14 (h)
2023 World Championships	Budapest, Hungary	Fouad Idbafdil	Men's 3000 m steeplechase	8:39.21	12 (h)
2023 World Championships	Budapest, Hungary	Omar Hassan	Men's marathon	2:17:23	41st
2023 World Championships	Budapest, Hungary	Mohammad Amin Alsalami	Men's long jump	7.46	18 (q)
2023 World Championships	Budapest, Hungary	Perina Lokure Nakang	Women's 800 m	2:15.84	8 (h)
2023 World Championships	Budapest, Hungary	Anjelina Nadai Lohalith	Women's 5000 m	15:35.25	15 (h)
2025 World Championships	Tokyo, Japan	Musa Suliman	Men's 800 m	1:48.28	9 (h)
2025 World Championships	Tokyo, Japan	Jamal Abdelmaji Eisa Mohammed	Men's 5000 m	13:58.90	20 (h)
2025 World Championships	Tokyo, Japan	Omar Hassan	Men's marathon	2:19:47	41
2025 World Championships	Tokyo, Japan	Kiruhura Emmanuel Ntagunga	Men's marathon	2:19:11	39
2025 World Championships	Tokyo, Japan	Perina Lokure Nakang	Women's 800 m	2:10.13	9 (h)
2025 World Championships	Tokyo, Japan	Farida Abaroge	Women's 5000 m	16:27.35	20 (h)

=== World Indoor Championships ===
Competition	Host City	Athlete	Event	Finished	
Competition	Host City	Athlete	Event	Result	Rank
2022 World Indoor Championships	Belgrade, Serbia	Anjelina Lohalith	Women's 1500 m	4:34.72	6 (h)

=== World Relay Championships ===
Competition	Venue	Athlete	Event	Final	
Competition	Venue	Athlete	Event	Result	Rank
2017 World Relays	Nassau, Bahamas	Gai Nyang; Paulo Amotun Lokoro; Wiyual Puok; Dominic Lokinyomo Lobalu	Men's 4 × 800 m relay	8:12.57	7
2019 World Relays	Yokohama, Japan	Rose Lokonyen; James Chiengjiek	Mixed 2 × 2 × 400 m relay	4:08.80	7

=== World Road Running Championships ===
Competition	Venue	Athlete	Event	Final	
Competition	Venue	Athlete	Event	Result	Rank
2018 Half Marathon Championships	Valencia, Spain	Paulo Amotun Lokoro	Men's half marathon	1:09:31	124
2018 Half Marathon Championships	Valencia, Spain	Ukuk Utho'o Bul	Men's half marathon	1:08:15	120
2020 Half Marathon Championships	Gdynia, Poland	Fouad Idbafdil	Men's half marathon	1:06:35	108
2020 Half Marathon Championships	Gdynia, Poland	Otmane Nait Hammou	Men's half marathon	1:03:28	67
2026 World Road Running Championships	Copenhagen, Denmark	Aron Gebremariam	Men's 5 km	13:36	26
2026 World Road Running Championships	Copenhagen, Denmark	Omar Hassan	Men's half marathon	1:06:32	100
2026 World Road Running Championships	Copenhagen, Denmark	Seare Weldezghi	Men's half marathon	1:01:53	40
2026 World Road Running Championships	Copenhagen, Denmark	Farida Abaroge	Women's 5 km	16:07	30

=== World Cross Country Championships ===
Competition	Venue	Athlete	Event	Final	
Competition	Venue	Athlete	Event	Result	Rank
2019 Cross Country Championships	Aarhus, Denmark	Jamal Abdelmaji Eisa Mohammed	Men's 10 km cross	35:09	85
2019 Cross Country Championships	Aarhus, Denmark	Otmane Nait Hammou	Men's 10 km cross	38:23	124
2023 Cross Country Championships	Bathurst, Australia	Seyd Taha Ghafari; Josephine Tain Augustino; Fouad Idbafdil; Anjelina Nadai Lohalith	4 x 2 km mixed relay cross	27:15	13
2024 Cross Country Championships	Belgrade, Serbia	Farida Abaroge	Women's 10 km XC	36:33	62
2024 Cross Country Championships	Belgrade, Serbia	Esterina Irino Julius	Women's 10 km XC	41:13	74
2024 Cross Country Championships	Belgrade, Serbia	Anjelina Nadai Lohalith	Women's 10 km XC	33:26	23
2024 Cross Country Championships	Belgrade, Serbia	Perina Lokure Nakang	Women's 10 km XC	41:18	75

=== Continental Championships ===
Competition	Venue	Athlete	Event	Final	
Competition	Venue	Athlete	Event	Result	Rank
2018 African Championships	Asaba, Nigeria	James Chiengjiek	Men's 800 m	1:58.69	11 (h)
2018 African Championships	Asaba, Nigeria	Joseph Elia Ernesto	Men's 800 m	1:55.20	12 (h)
2018 African Championships	Asaba, Nigeria	Yiech Pur Biel	Men's 800 m	1:53.20	10 (h)
2018 African Championships	Asaba, Nigeria	Paulo Amotun Lokoro	Men's 1500 m	4:03.44	15 (f)
2018 African Championships	Asaba, Nigeria	Dominic Lokinyomo Lobalu	Men's 5000 m	14:07.22	11
2018 African Championships	Asaba, Nigeria	Ukuk Otho'o Bul	Men's 5000 m	15:01.50	20
2018 African Championships	Asaba, Nigeria	Chajen Dang Yien	Women's javelin throw	??.??	9
2022 African Championships	Saint Pierre, Mauritius	Dominic Lokolong Atiol	Men's 1500 m	4:06.21	11 (h)
2022 African Championships	Saint Pierre, Mauritius	Emmanuel Kiruhura	Men's 5000 m	14:27.80	12
2022 African Championships	Saint Pierre, Mauritius	Rose Ihisa Uwaro	Women's 400 m	1:06.63	21 (h)
2022 African Championships	Saint Pierre, Mauritius	Anjelina Lohalith	Women's 800 m	2:19.29	16 (h)
2022 African Championships	Saint Pierre, Mauritius	Anjelina Lohalith	Women's 1500 m	4:33.74	10
2022 European Championships	Munich, Germany	Jamal Abdelmaji Eisa Mohammed	Men's 10.000 m	DNF	
2022 European Championships	Munich, Germany	Tachlowini Gabriyesos	Men's marathon	DNF	
2026 African Championships	Accra, Ghana	Kun Waar Liem	Men's 200 m	22.84	5 (h)
2026 African Championships	Accra, Ghana	Solomon Ayela Okeny	Men's 400 m	52.40	7 (h)
2026 African Championships	Accra, Ghana	Aden Hassan Abdifatah	Men's 1500 m	3:57.05	10 (h)
2026 African Championships	Accra, Ghana	Lokoro Dario	Men's 5000 m	15:10.56	25
2026 African Championships	Accra, Ghana	Perina Lokure Nakang	Women's 800 m	2:10.03	8 (h)

=== Continental Indoor Championships ===
Competition	Host city	Athlete	Event	Placement	
Competition	Host city	Athlete	Event	Result	Rank
2017 Asian Indoor and Martial Arts Games	Ashgabat, Turkmenistan	Wiyual Puok Deng	Men's 400 m	50.96	4 (h)
2017 Asian Indoor and Martial Arts Games	Ashgabat, Turkmenistan	Yiech Biel	Men's 800 m	1:56.53	5 (sf)
2017 Asian Indoor and Martial Arts Games	Ashgabat, Turkmenistan	Gai Nyang Tap	Men's 800 m	1:58.70	5 (h)
2017 Asian Indoor and Martial Arts Games	Ashgabat, Turkmenistan	Paulo Amotun Lokoro	Men's 1500 m	3:59.45	4q (h) (Note: DNS in final)
2017 Asian Indoor and Martial Arts Games	Ashgabat, Turkmenistan	Ukuk Utho'o Bul	Men's 3000 m	8:33.02	7 (f)
2021 European Indoor Championships	Toruń, Poland	Dorian Keletela	Men's 60 m	6.91	8 (h)

=== Age group events ===
Competition	Host city	Athlete	Event	Placement	
Competition	Host city	Athlete	Event	Result	Rank
2017 World U18 Championships	Nairobi, Kenya	Mohammed Ahmed Abubakar	Men's 1500 m	4:23.38	12 (h)
2017 World U18 Championships	Nairobi, Kenya	Lydia Philip Mamun	Women's 400 m	1:07.55	5 (h)
2017 World U18 Championships	Nairobi, Kenya	Sunday Kamisa Peter	Women's 800 m	2:32.76	4 (h)
2018 World U20 Championships	Tampere, Finland	Dominic Lokolong Atiol	Men's 1500 m	3:59.63	12 (h)
2018 World U20 Championships	Tampere, Finland	Lydia Philip Mamun	Women's 800 m	DQ (h)	
2019 European Youth Olympic Festival	Baku, Azerbaijan	Nazret Kobodom	Girl's 3000 m	10:45.11	10
2021 World U20 Championships	Nairobi, Kenya	Joseph Loboi Morris	Men's 3000 m	DQ	
2021 World U20 Championships	Nairobi, Kenya	Emmaculate Napeyok	Women's 200 m	29.50	30 (h)
2021 World U20 Championships	Nairobi, Kenya	Alice Ilam Samuel	Women's 800 m	2:43.76	25 (h)
2022 European Youth Olympic Festival	Banská Bystrica, Slovakia	Molham Hawana	Boys' javelin	56.87m	7
2023 European Youth Olympic Festival	Maribor, Slovenia	S. Baba Swaray	Boys' 800		
2024 World U20 Championships	Lima, Peru	Joseph Loboi Morris	Men's 400 m	58.03	8 (h)
2024 World U20 Championships	Lima, Peru	Lokoro Dario	Men's 3000 m	9:06.53	20
2024 World U20 Championships	Lima, Peru	Zinad Joseph	Women's 100 m	DNS	—
2024 World U20 Championships	Lima, Peru	Zinad Joseph	Women's 200 m	27.11	8 (h)

=== Other events ===
Competition	Host city	Athlete	Event	Placement	
Competition	Host city	Athlete	Event	Result	Rank
2021 European 10,000 m Cup	Birmingham, United Kingdom	Jamal Abdelmaji Eisa Mohammed	Men's 10,000 m	28:52.64	25
2021 European 10,000 m Cup	Birmingham, United Kingdom	Tachlowini Gabriyesos	Men's 10,000 m	30:29.91	48
2021 European 10,000 m Cup	Birmingham, United Kingdom	Fouad Idbafdil	Men's 10,000 m	DNF	
2021 European Cross Country Championships	Dublin, Ireland	Jamal Abdelmaji Eisa Mohammed	Men's 10 km cross	31:38	31
2021 European Cross Country Championships	Dublin, Ireland	Jamal Ismail Gabir Arabi	Men's 10 km cross	34:11	73
2021 European Cross Country Championships	Dublin, Ireland	Tachlowini Gabriyesos	Men's 10 km cross	32:19	49
2021 European Cross Country Championships	Dublin, Ireland	Fouad Idbafdil	Men's 10 km cross	33:11	61
2021 European Cross Country Championships	Dublin, Ireland	Otmane Nait Hammou	Men's 10 km cross	33:28	65
2022 European 10,000 m Cup	Pacé, France	Jamal Abdelmaji Eisa Mohammed	Men's 10,000 m	29:19.90	34
2022 European 10,000 m Cup	Pacé, France	Seyd Taha Ghafari	Men's 10,000 m	31:25.52	55
2022 European 10,000 m Cup	Pacé, France	Tachlowini Gabriyesos	Men's 10,000 m	30:36.01	52
2022 European Cross Country Championships	Turin, Italy	Jamal Abdelmaji Eisa Mohammed	Men's 10 km cross	31:12	38
2022 European Cross Country Championships	Turin, Italy	Tesfay Felfele	Men's 10 km cross	32:58	68
2022 European Cross Country Championships	Turin, Italy	Tachlowini Gabriyesos	Men's 10 km cross	31:38	51
2022 European Cross Country Championships	Turin, Italy	Seyd Taha Ghafari	Men's 10 km cross	31:34	49
2022 European Cross Country Championships	Turin, Italy	Fouad Idbafdil	Men's 10 km cross	32:19	61
2023 European Cross Country Championships	Brussels, Belgium	Habtom Amaniel	Men's 10 km cross	33:51	71
2023 European Cross Country Championships	Brussels, Belgium	Jamal Abdelmaji Eisa Mohammed	Men's 10 km cross	30:43	9
2024 European Cross Country Championships	Antalya, Turkey	Kiruhura Emmanuel Ntagunga	Men's cross	24:28	74
2024 European Cross Country Championships	Antalya, Turkey	Farida Abaroge	Women's cross	28:16	64
2025 European Cross Country Championships	Lagoa, Portugal	Seyfu Jamaal Tahir	Men's cross	23:57	57
2025 European Cross Country Championships	Lagoa, Portugal	Farida Abaroge	Women's cross	27:57	63
2026 European 10,000 m Cup	La Spezia, Italy	Seare Weldezghi	Men's 10,000 m	29:28.40	34
2026 European 10,000 m Cup	La Spezia, Italy	Farida Abaroge	Women's 10,000 m	33:54.07	31

== See also ==
- Authorised Neutral Athletes
- Independent Olympians at the Olympic Games
