= Birke Haylom =

Ethiopian long-distance runner

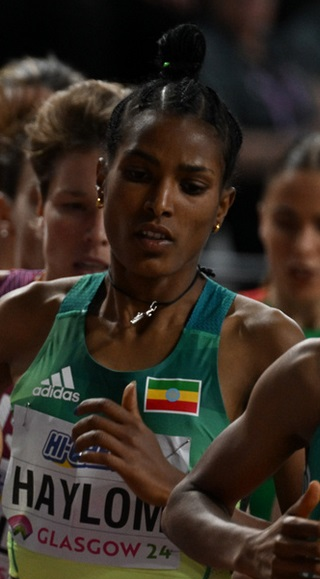
- Haylom in 2024

Personal information
- Nationality: Ethiopian
- Born: January 6, 2006 (age 20) Alaje, Tigray Region, Ethiopia

Sport
- Country: Ethiopia
- Sport: Athletics
- Event: Long-distance running

Achievements and titles
- Personal bests: 1500 m: 3:57.66 (Rabat 2023); Mile: 4:17.13 (Oslo 2023); 3000m 8:25.37 (Liévin, 2025); 5000m 14:23.71 (Eugene, 2024)
Medal record
Women's athletics
Representing Ethiopia
World Junior Championships
Gold medal – first place	2022 Cali	1500 m
World Cross Country Championships
Silver medal – second place	2023 Bathurst	Mixed relay

Birke Haylom (born 6 January 2006) is an Ethiopian long-distance runner. She won a silver medal in the mixed relay at the 2023 World Athletics Cross Country Championships.

She won gold at the 1500 metres at the 2022 World Athletics U20 Championships. She set U20 world records in the mile run, 5000 metres, and 1500 metres and 3000 metres indoors. However, these were not ratified by World Athletics amid uncertainty over her age.

== Biography ==
Haylom won the gold medal in the 1500 metres at the 2022 World Athletics U20 Championships in Cali, Colombia in August 2022. She ran a championship record time of 4:04.27.

=== 2023 ===
In February 2023 she won a silver medal in the mixed relay at the 2023 World Athletics Cross Country Championships, held in Bathurst, Australia. Her Ethiopia team completed the course in 23:21, with Haylom racing alongside Adehana Kasaye, Hawi Abera, and Getnet Wale.

At the Diamond League meeting in Doha on 5 May 2023, she ran a new personal best time of 4:01.86 for the 1500m, finishing sixth in the race. Competing in the Diamond League in Rabat in May 2023, she ran 3:57.66 as she finished third behind compatriots Freweyni Hailu and Gudaf Tsegay.

At the Bislett Games on 15 June 2023, she won the Dream Mile in 4:17.13. Selected for the 1500m at the 2023 World Athletics Championships, she qualified for the final and finished ninth overall.

=== 2024 ===
Competing in Boston, Massachusetts in February 2024, she set a new indoor 1500m personal best time of 3:58.43. She qualified for the final of the women's 1500 metres race at the 2024 World Athletics Indoor Championships in Glasgow. In the final she finished in ninth place with a time of 4:06.27.

She ran a personal best of 14:23.71 to place fifth in the 5000 metres at the 2024 Prefontaine Classic in Eugene, Oregon. She finished fourth in the 1500m at the 2024 BAUHAUS-galan Diamond League event in Stockholm on 2 June 2024. She competed in the 1500 metres at the 2024 Summer Olympics in Paris in August 2024, reaching the semi-final.

=== 2025 ===
In February 2025, she took seven seconds from her indoor personal best with 8:25.37, in Liévin on 13 February 2025. She lowered her 1500 metres indoors personal best on 16 February 2025, running 3:59.82 at the Copernicus Cup on 16 February 2025. She was selected for the 3000 metres at the 2025 World Athletics Indoor Championships in Nanjing in March 2025. She finished third over 5000 metres at the 2025 Xiamen Diamond League event in China, in April 2025, and fourth over 5000 metres at the 2025 Golden Gala in Rome and third over 1500 metres at the 2025 Meeting de Paris. She placed seventh in the 1500 metres at the Diamond League Final in Zurich on 28 August.

In September 2025, she competed over 5000 metres at the 2025 World Championships in Tokyo, Japan, without advancing to the final. In November, she was nominated for the World Athletics Rising Star Award.

=== 2026 ===
Haylom made a strong start to her 2026 indoor season with a win at the BAUHAUS-Galan Indoor, winning the 1500m by over nine seconds in 4:02.79. She also set a meeting record at the Czech Golden Gala in Ostrava of 4:00.62. After placing third in 4:00.92 on 22 February 2026 at the Copernicus Cup in Toruń, she was crowned the overall winner of the 1500 metres on the 2026 World Athletics Indoor Tour, for which the reward was a wildcard for the 2026 World Athletics Indoor Championships in Poland in March 2026, permitting Ethiopia to still send two additional athletes, Haregeweyni Kalayu and Saron Berhe, although both were later were unable to compete due to issues obtaining the requisite VISA. At the championships, Haylom advanced to the final of the 1500 m after winning her heat in 4:10.66. In the final, she made an early move to the front and ran 400m in 1:02.32 and 800m in 2:05.30, faster than the men's race on the same evening, to build a lead in excess of three seconds, before being caught and passed on the final lap to place fifth in 4:01.34.

In May 2026, Haylom won over 1500 metres in 3:55.56, to break the meeting record set by Faith Kipyegon, leading an Ethiopian one-two finish with Tsige Duguma, at the 2026 Shanghai Diamond League. The following week she was runner-up over the same distance at the 2026 Xiamen Diamond League. On 7 June, she also won the 1500 metres at the 2026 Bauhausgalan in Stockholm and on 19 June, she front-ran a win in the 1500 metres with 3:59.89 at the 2026 Doha Diamond League. In September, she placed eleventh over 1500 m at the inaugural World Ultimate Championship in Budapest.
