= Ayal Dagnachew =

Ethiopian middle-distance runner

Personal information
- Full name: Ayal Dagnachew Asegu
- National team: Ethiopia
- Born: 18 January 2002 (age 24)

Sport
- Country: Ethiopia
- Sport: Athletics
- Event: middle-distance running

Achievements and titles
- Personal best: 800 m: 2:02.94 (2021)
Medal record
World U20 Championships
Gold medal – first place	2021 Nairobi	800 m

Ayal Dagnachew Asegu (born 18 January 2002) is an Ethiopian middle-distance runner who specializes in the 800 metres. She was the gold medallist at the World Athletics U20 Championships in 2021.
