= Daniel Munguti =

Kenyan athlete (born 1995)

Personal information
- Nationality: Kenyan
- Born: Daniel Kyumbe Munguti; 28 February 1995 (age 31)

Sport
- Sport: Athletics
- Event: Middle distance running

Achievements and titles
- Personal bests: 1500m: 3:33.71 (Nairobi, 2024)
Medal record
Men's athletics
Representing Kenya
World Road Running Championships
Bronze medal – third place	2026 Copenhagen	Mile mixed team
World Cross Country Championships
Gold medal – first place	2024 Belgrade	Mixed relay
Gold medal – first place	2023 Bathurst	Mixed relay

Daniel Kyumbe Munguti (born 28 February 1995) is a Kenyan middle distance runner.

== Biography ==
He won a gold medal with Kenyan relay team at the 2023 World Athletics Cross Country Championships in Bathurst.

In June 2023, he won the Kenyan Athletics national title over 1500 metres in Nairobi in 3:37.38. He competed in the mile race at the 2023 World Athletics Road Running Championships in Riga in 2023, placing thirteenth.

He won a gold medal with Kenyan relay team at the 2024 World Athletics Cross Country Championships in Belgrade. He ran a personal best 3:33.71 for the 1500 metres at the 2024 Kip Keino Classic.

He finished runner-up to Reynold Cheruiyot at the Kenyan 1500m Olympic trials in June 2024. He ran as part of the Kenyan team which placed fourth in the mixed relay race at the 2026 World Athletics Cross Country Championships in Tallahassee, United States. In April, he placed third behind over 1500 metres at the 2026 Kip Keino Classic. Competing in the mile run at the World Athletics Road Running Championships on 19 September 2026, he won the bronze medal in the mixed team competition.
