= Hirut Meshesha =

Ethiopian middle-distance runner

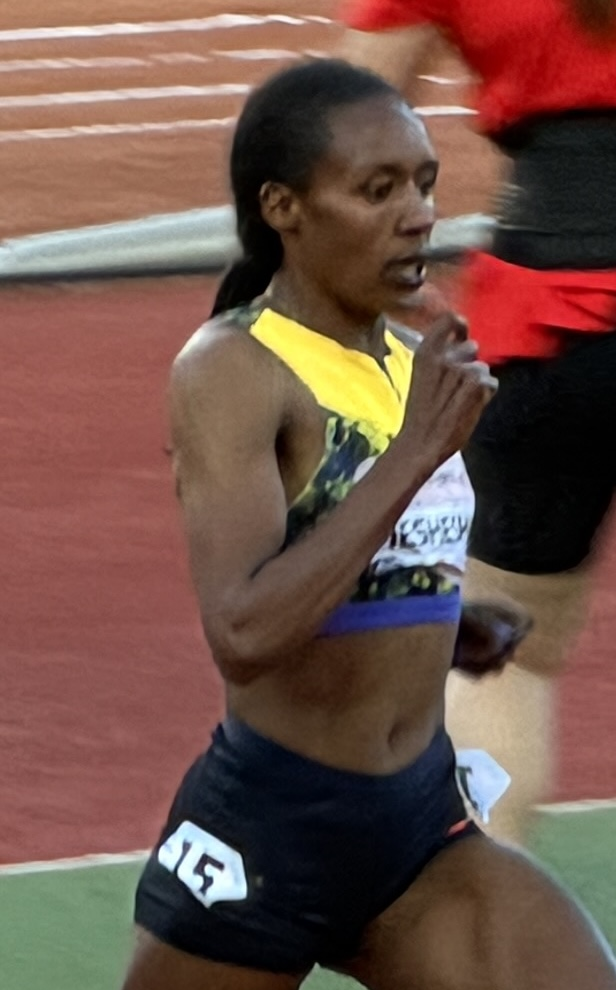

Personal information
- Full name: Hirut Meshesha Mero
- Nationality: Ethiopian
- Born: 20 January 2001 (age 25)
- Height: 167 cm (5 ft 6 in)

Sport
- Country: Ethiopia
- Sport: Track running
- Events: 800 metres; 1500 metres

Achievements and titles
- Personal bests: 800 m: 1:58.54 (Castellón, 2022); 1500 m: 3:54.87 (Chorzów, 2023); 5000 m: 14:29.29 (Xiamen, 2025); Indoors; 1500 m: 3:56.47 (Toruń, 2024); Mile: 4:19.53 (Ostrava, 2024); 3000 m: 8:28.46 (Metz, 2024)
Medal record
Women's athletics
Representing Ethiopia
World Cross Country Championships
Bronze medal – third place	2026 Tallahassee	Mixed relay
World Indoor Championships
Bronze medal – third place	2022 Belgrade	1500 m
African Games
Gold medal – first place	2019 Rabat	800 m
Gold medal – first place	2023 Accra	1500 m
African Junior Championships
Silver medal – second place	2019 Abidjan	800 m
Olympic Youth Games
Bronze medal – third place	2018 Buenos Aires	800 m
World Youth Championships
Bronze medal – third place	2017 Nairobi	800 m
African Youth Games
Gold medal – first place	2018 Algiers	800 m

Hirut Meshesha (born 20 January 2001) is an Ethiopian middle-distance runner. She won the bronze medal in the women's 1500 metres at the 2022 World Indoor Championships in Belgrade. Meshesha took gold for the 800 metres at the 2019 African Games.

== Career ==
Hirut Meshesha gained her first international experience at the 2017 IAAF World U18 Championships held in Nairobi, Kenya, where she won the bronze medal in the girls' 800 metres. She then went to Argentina for 2018 Summer Youth Olympics in Buenos Aires and took bronze in the girls' 800m event

In April 2019, she competed at the African U18 and U20 Championships, which were held in Abidjan, Ivory Coast, and won the silver medal at 800m in the under-20 women category. A month later, she won the women's 800 metres at the Ethiopian Athletics Championships. In August, Meshesha represented Ethiopia at the 2019 African Games held in Rabat, Morocco and won the gold medal in the 800m event.

She earned the bronze medal for the women's 1500 metres at the 2022 World Indoor Championships held in Belgrade, Serbia. Her compatriot Gudaf Tsegay led an Ethiopian medals sweep as Axumawit Embaye came second.

== Statistics ==
=== International championships ===
Representing Ethiopia
Year	Competition	Venue	Position	Event	Result
2017	World U18 Championships	Nairobi, Kenya	3rd	800 m	2:06.32
2018	African Youth Games	Algiers, Algeria	1st	800 m	2:04.66
2018	Youth Olympics	Buenos Aires, Argentina	3rd	800 m	2:08.35; 2:06.25
2019	African U18/U20 Championships, U20 events	Abidjan, Ivory Coast	2nd	800 m	2:04.70
2019	African Games	Rabat, Morocco	1st	800 m	2:03.16
2022	World Indoor Championships	Belgrade, Serbia	3rd	1500 m	4:03.39
2022	World Championships	Eugene, United States	12th	1500 m	4:05.86
2023	World Championships	Budapest, Hungary	20th (sf)	1500 m	4:04.27
2024	World Indoor Championships	Glasgow, United Kingdom	7th	3000 m	8:34.61
2024	African Games	Accra, Ghana	1st	1500 m	4:05.71
2024	World Ultimate Championship	Budapest, Hungary	9th	5000 m	14:42.49

=== Circuit performances ===
Grand Slam Track results
Slam	Race group	Event	Pl.	Time	Prize money
2025 Miami Slam	Long distance	5000 m	3rd	14:40.46	US$50,000
2025 Miami Slam	Long distance	3000 m	1st	8:22.72	US$50,000

==== Wins and titles ====
- Diamond League
  - 2022 (3) (1500 m): Rabat Meeting International Mohammed VI d'Athlétisme, Rome Golden Gala, Chorzów Kamila Skolimowska Memorial

=== National championships ===
- Ethiopian Championships
  - 800 metres: 2019

=== Personal bests ===
- 1500 metres – 3:57.30 (2022)
  - 1500 metres indoor – 4:02.14 (2022)
