= Athlete Refugee Team at the 2019 World Athletics Championships =

Athlete Refugee Team at the 2019 World Championships in Athletics
- WA code: ART

in Doha, Qatar 27 September 2019 – 6 October 2019
- Competitors: 6 (5 men and 1 woman) in 4 events

World Championships in Athletics appearances
- 2017; 2019; 2022; 2023; 2025

The Athlete Refugee Team (ART) competed at the 2019 World Championships in Athletics in Doha, Qatar, from 27 September to 6 October 2019. It was represented by 6 athletes.

== Results ==
=== Men ===
Track and road events

Athlete	Event	Heat		Semifinal		Final	
Athlete	Event	Result	Rank	Result	Rank	Result	Rank
Paulo Lokoro	1500 metres	3:48.98	42	Did not advance			
Jamal Eisa Mohammed	5000 metres	14:15.32	32	—		Did not advance	
Tachlowini Gabriyesos	5000 metres	14:28.11	34	—		Did not advance	
Fouad Idbafdil	3000 metres steeplechase	DNF		—		Did not advance	
Otmane Nait Hammou	3000 metres steeplechase	9:30.17	44	—		Did not advance	

=== Women ===
Track and road events

Athlete	Event	Heat		Semifinal		Final	
Athlete	Event	Result	Rank	Result	Rank	Result	Rank
Rose Lokonyen	800 metres	2:13.39 PB	7	Did not advance			
