= Jamal Abdelmaji =

Sudanese athlete (born 1995)

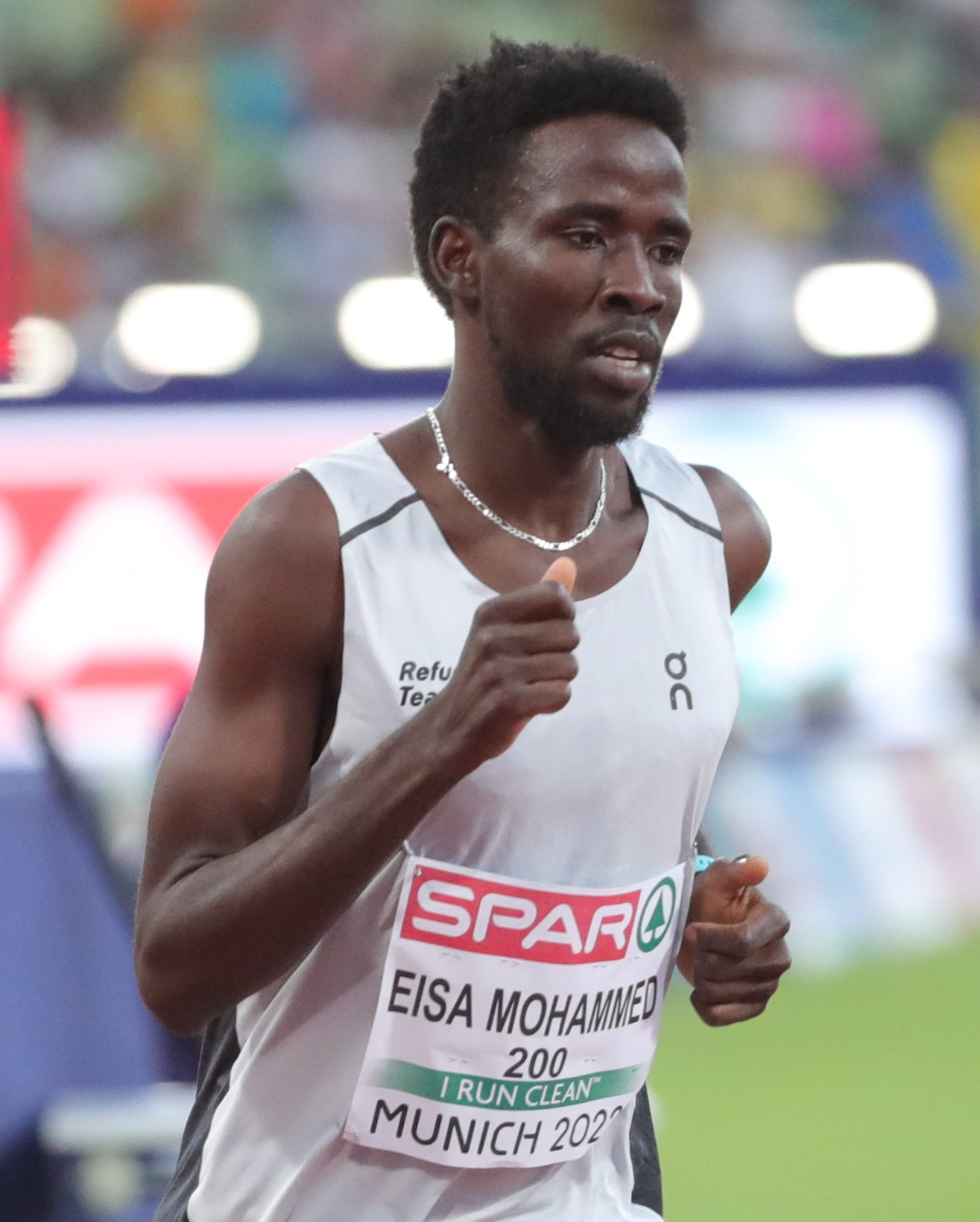
- Jamal Abdelmaji Eisa Mohammed in 2022

Personal information
- Native name: جمال عبد المجي عيسى محمد
- National team: ART; Refugee Olympic Team
- Born: Jamal Abdelmaji Eisa Mohammed; 25 August 1995 (age 30) Barde, Wasat Darfur, Sudan

Sport
- Sport: Athletics
- Events: 3000 metres, 5000 metres, 10,000 metres
- Club: Alley Runners Club
- Coached by: Yuval Carmi

Achievements and titles
- Personal best: 3000 m: 7:56.41 (Birmingham 2023) 5000 m: 13:20.21 (Vienna 2023) 10,000 m: 27:35.92 (Paris 2024)

Jamal Abdelmaji Eisa Mohammed (Arabic: جمال عبد المجي عيسى محمد; born 25 August 1995) is a Sudanese-born runner now living in Israel who competes internationally over 5,000 and 10,000 metres. Mohammed was one of 29 athletes across 12 disciplines who represented the Refugee Olympic Team at the 2020 Tokyo Olympics, and he also competed on the Refugee Olympic Team at the 2024 Summer Olympics.

== Early life ==
Mohammed was born in Darfur. He has two brothers and a sister.

In 2003, when he was 8 years old, his village was attacked by the Janjaweed militia, who killed 97 people, including his father. On his father's advice, he hid under several corpses and survived the attack. Afterward, his mother took him and his younger siblings to Omdurman, where Mohammed, still a child, started cleaning shoes and selling goods to support his family.

In 2010, a friend told him about smugglers who could take him to Canada via Israel. Mohammed, hoping to study and support his family, wanted to leave, although his mother was against it; he was turned back at the border the first time he tried to leave. On a later attempt, he flew to Cairo on a fake passport that gave his age as 18 instead of 17. He and three other refugees traveled north and paid a smuggler to take them to the Israeli border. After being found by Israeli soldiers, he spent a short time in a refugee camp before being sent to Tel Aviv. Given no direction, Mohammed followed other African migrants to a park, where he met another Sudanese man who took him to an apartment where he stayed with seven other men. He began working as a painter and was able to send money to his family.

== Career ==
In 2014, Mohammed joined the Alley Runners Club, a disadvantaged youth support organization, and began running.

In 2017, he was awarded an International Olympic Committee Refugee Athlete Scholarship.

Mohammed finished 40th in his European Cross Country Champion Clubs Cup debut in 2017. He was 30th in 2018, and 22nd in 2019. He finished 85th at the 2019 IAAF World Cross Country Championships, which he described as "really hard. I never saw a cross country like that in my life." In September, he competed at the 2019 World Athletics Championships and finished 17th in his heat.

Mohammed competed at the 2020 Summer Olympics as a member of the Refugee Olympic Team. He competed in the men's 5000 metres, where he finished 13th in his heat with a time of 13:42.98.

After the Olympics, he also competed in the 2022 World Athletics Championships, where he finished 20th in his heat. In 2024, he was again selected for the Refugee Olympic Team and competed in the 10,000 metres at the 2024 Summer Olympics in Paris in August 2024. There he finished 18th overall with a new personal best.

He was named for the Athlete Refugee Team to compete over 5000 metres at the 2025 World Championships in Tokyo, Japan, but did not advance to the final.

== Personal life ==
Mohammed lives with a host family he met through the Alley Runners Club. He completed his studies in sports massage and performs massage for members of the club.

== Competitions ==
| Year | Competition | Venue | Position | Event | Notes |
Representing ART
| 2019 | World Cross Country Championships | Aarhus, Denmark | 85th | 10k cross | 35:09 |
| 2019 | World Championships | Doha, Qatar | 32nd (h) | 5000 m | 14:15.32 |
| 2021 | European 10,000m Cup | Birmingham, Great Britain | 25th | 10,000 m | 28:52.64 |
| 2021 | Olympic Games | Tokyo, Japan | 23rd (h) | 5000 m | 13.42.98 |
| 2022 | World Championships | Eugene, United States | 36th (h) | 5000 m | 14:02.79 |
| 2022 | European Championships | Munich, Germany | – | 10,000 m | DNF |
| 2024 | Olympic Games | Paris, France | 18th | 10,000 m | 27:35.92 |
| 2025 | World Championships | Tokyo, Japan | 38th (h) | 5000 m | 13:58.90 |

== See also ==
- Refugees of Sudan
- Sudanese in Israel
- War in Darfur
