= Purity Chepkirui =

Kenyan long-distance runner

Personal information
- National team: Kenyan
- Born: 14 February 2003 (age 23)

Sport
- Country: Kenya
- Sport: Athletics
- Event: 1500 metres

Achievements and titles
- Personal best: 1500 m : 4:10.39 (2021)
Medal record
Women's athletics
Representing Kenya
World U20 Championships
Gold medal – first place	2021 Nairobi	1500 m
Silver medal – second place	2022 Cali	1500 m

Purity Chepkirui (born 14 February 2003) is a Kenyan long-distance runner who specializes in the 1500 metres. She was the gold medallist at the World Athletics U20 Championships in 2021.
