= Farida Abaroge =

Ethiopian athlete (born 1994)

Personal information
- Born: 1994 (age 31–32) Jimma, Oromia Region, Ethiopia

Sport
- Sport: Athletics
- Events: Middle distance, Cross-country running

Achievements and titles
- Personal bests: 1500m: 4:27.47 (Decines, 2023)

Farida Abaroge (born 1994, credited as 1 January) is a middle distance and cross country runner. She was selected to compete for the IOC Refugee Team at the 2024 Paris Olympics.

== Early and personal life ==
Aborage is a karate black belt and was a footballer in her native Jimma, in the southwest of Ethiopia before fleeing due to persecution. She claimed asylum in France in 2017 via Sudan, an Egyptian refugee camp, and imprisonment in Libya. After arriving at the refugee reception centre in Thal-Marmoutier, in northern Alsace, she is based in Strasbourg.

== Career ==
At the 2022 French Athletics Championships, she finished 15th in the 10,000m race with a time of 35:30. In July 2023, she set a personal best time in the 1500 metres of 4:27.47.

Abaroge received a Refugee Athlete Scholarship from the Olympic Refuge Foundation (ORF) in December 2023.

Abaroge competed at the 2024 World Athletics Cross Country Championships in Belgrade. In May 2024, she was selected to compete at the 2024 Paris Olympics in the 1500 metres as part of the IOC Refugee Team. She finished fourteenth in her heat and did not advance to the semi-finals through the repechange round.

She was named for the Athlete Refugee Team in September 2025 to compete over 5000 metres at the 2025 World Championships in Tokyo, Japan, without advancing to the final.

== Competitions ==
Year	Competition	Venue	Position	Event	Notes
Representing Refugee Athletes
2024	World Cross Country Championships	Belgrade, Serbia	62nd	10 km XC	36:33
2024	Olympic Games	Paris, France	14th (h)	1500 m	4:29.27
2024	European Cross Country Championships	Antalya, Turkey	64th	7.5 km XC	28:16
2025	World Championships	Tokyo, Japan	40th (h)	5000 m	16:27.35
2025	European Cross Country Championships	Lagoa, Portugal	63rd	7290M XC	27:57
2026	European 10,000m Cup	La Spezia, Italy	31st	10,000 m	33:54.07
2026	World Road Running Championships	Copenhagen, Denmark	30th	5 km	16:07
