= Perina Lokure Nakang =

South Sudanese athlete (born 2003)

Personal information
- Born: 2003 (age 22–23)

Sport
- Sport: Athletics
- Event: Middle-distance running

Achievements and titles
- Personal bests: 800m: 2:08.20 (Paris, 2024)

Perina Lokure Nakang (born 2003) is a middle-distance runner from South Sudan who now lives in Kenya after fleeing conflict in South Sudan. She competed in the 800 metres event at the 2024 Summer Olympics as a member of the Refugee Olympic Team.

== Early life ==
Nakang was born in South Sudan. Her name means "hard work" in Didinga. She left to seek sanctuary in Kenya with her aunt in 2010 at the age of seven years old due to the conflict in her home country. They lived in a UNHCR refugee camp in Kakuma, northern Kenya. She was later reunited with her mother and four siblings, although her father died under unclear circumstances after she fled. To train and continue her education, she attended the boarding school All4Running Shoes4Africa Secondary School in Kapsabet, Kenya.

== Career ==
Nakang tried several sports at the refugee camp and began running in 2019. She began with sprinting 100 or 200 metres before increasing the distance she ran.

She is part of the World Athletics U20 refugee programme and the African Higher Education in Emergencies Network (AHEEN) and Youth Education and Sports (YES). She is coached by Janeth Jepkosgei in a group that also contains Brenda Chebet and Nelly Chepchirchir. She finished seventh at the Kenyan national trials 800m race in 2023.

She competed in the 800 metres at the 2023 World Athletics Championships in Budapest. Although she did not make it out of the first round of heats, she enjoyed competing at the same event as Athing Mu-Nikolayev, who she looks up to as she also has South Sudanese heritage.

She competed at the 2024 World Athletics Cross Country Championships in Belgrade as part of the World Athletics Athlete Refugee Team.

In May 2024, she was confirmed to be on the IOC Refugee Team for the 2024 Paris Olympics. Ahead of the Olympics, she trained at a high-altitude camp in Eldoret. In August, she competed at the Olympics in the 800 metres event and finished last in her heat, though she set a new personal best.

In September 2025, she competed for the Athlete Refugee Team in the women's 800 metres at the 2025 World Athletics Championships in Tokyo, Japan.

== Competitions ==
Year	Competition	Venue	Position	Event	Notes
Representing Refugee Athletes
2023	World Championships	Budapest, Hungary	8th (h)	800 m	2:15.84
2024	World Cross Country Championships	Belgrade, Serbia	75th	10 km XC	41:18
2024	Olympic Games	Paris, France	8th (h)	800 m	2:08.20
2025	World Championships	Tokyo, Japan	54th (h)	800 m	2:10.13
2026	African Championships	Accra, Ghana	17th (h)	800 m	2:10.03

== Personal life ==
She was one of four refugee athletes featured in a promotional video entitled Watch Where We're Going made by Nike in collaboration with the International Olympic Committee (IOC) and advertising agency Wieden+Kennedy Amsterdam, designed to highlight the experiences of discrimination and prejudice faced by refugees.
