= Anjelina Lohalith =

South Sudanese-born track and field athlete

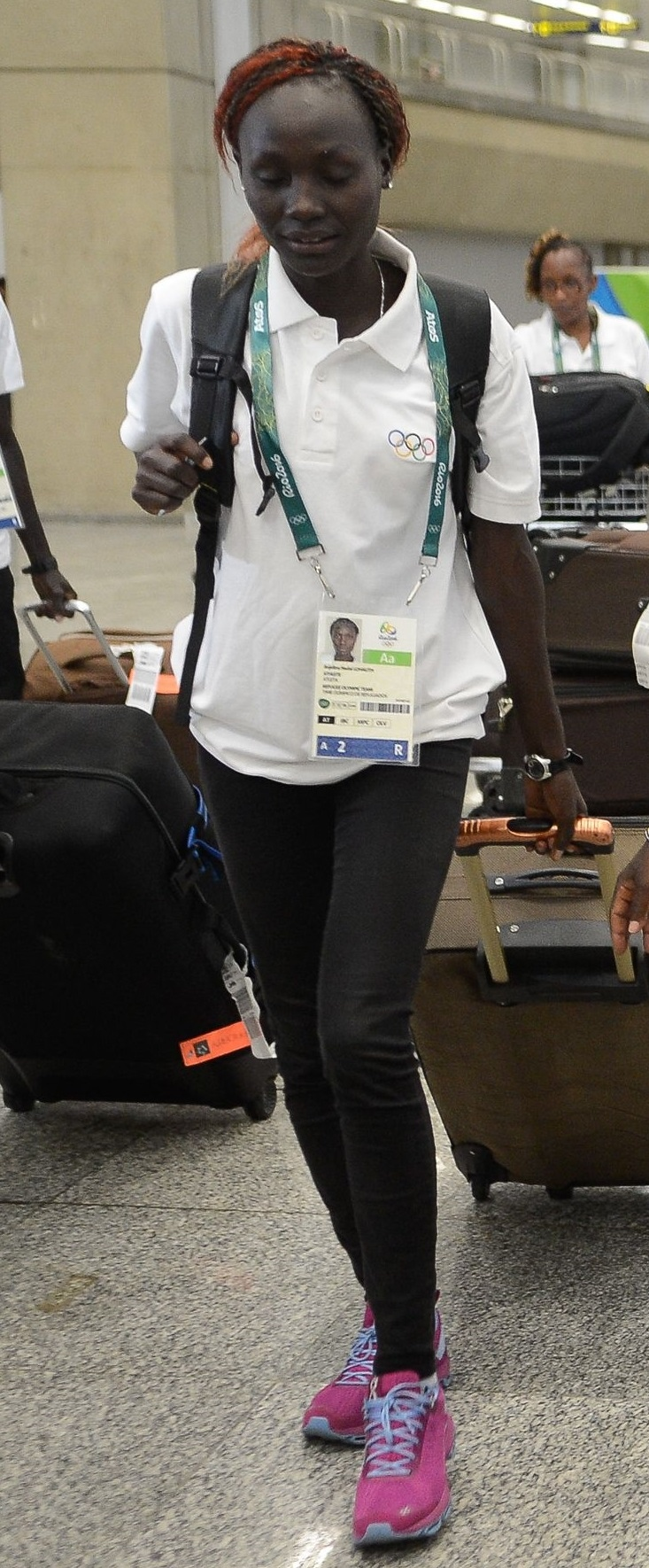
- Anjelina Lohalith arrives in Rio de Janeiro for the 2016 Summer Olympics

Personal information
- Nationality: South Sudanese
- Citizenship: South Sudanese
- Born: January 1, 1993 (age 33)

Sport
- Sport: Athletics
- Event: 1500m
- Updated on 16 September 2016

Anjelina Nadai Lohalith (born 1993, credited as January 1) is a track and field athlete originally from South Sudan, but now living and training in Kenya. She competed as part of the Refugee Olympic Team at the 2016 Summer Olympics.

== Early life ==
Lohalith was born in South Sudan. In 2001 when Lohalith was eight years old she had to leave her home during the Second Sudanese Civil War as the conflict and violence closed in on her village with landmines being found near her home. She was separated from her parents as they sent her to Kenya for safety. She arrived in northern Kenya in 2002, settling in the Kakuma refugee camp. While attending primary school in the camp she took up running.

== Career ==
When professional coaches came to Kakuma to hold selection trials for a special training camp, they identified Lohalith's athletic ability and she was selected to train under Olympic champion marathon runner Tegla Loroupe at her sports foundation in Nairobi. Here, the 1500m runner trains with four other runners from South Sudan who will participate in the Olympic refugee team at Rio 2016. who has been selected by the International Olympic Committee (IOC) to compete for the Refugee Olympic Team in the women's 1500 m at the 2016 Summer Olympics in Rio de Janeiro, Brazil. Lohalith placed 40th out of 41 runners in Round 1 of the event with a time of 4:47.38. She did not advance.

Lohalith hopes that through her success in running she will be able to help her parents who she has not seen since she was 8 years old.

After an initial suspension, in December 2024 Lohalith was issued with three-year ban backdated to March 2024 for an anti-doping rule violation after testing positive for trimetazidine.

== Competitions ==
Year	Competition	Venue	Position	Event	Notes
Representing Refugee Athletes
2016	Olympic Games	Rio de Janeiro, Brazil	40th (h)	1500 m	4:47.38
2017	World Championships	London, United Kingdom	43rd (h)	1500 m	4:33.54
2021	Olympic Games	Tokyo, Japan	14th (h)	1500 m	4:31.65
2022	World Indoor Championships	Belgrade, Serbia	19th (h)	1500 m	4:34.72
2022	African Championships	Port Louis, Mauritius	16th (h)	800 m	2:19.29
2022	African Championships	Port Louis, Mauritius	10th	1500 m	4:33.74
2022	World Championships	Eugene, United States	42nd (h)	1500 m	4:23.84
2023	World Cross Country Championships	Bathurst, Australia	13th	4 x 2 km mixed relay XC	27:15
2023	World Championships	Budapest, Hungary	32nd (h)	5000 m	15:35.25
2024	World Cross Country Championships	Belgrade, Serbia	~~23rd~~ DQ	10km XC	~~33:26~~
