= Brenda Chebet =

Kenyan athlete

Personal information
- Nationality: Kenyan
- Born: March 16, 2004 (age 22)

Sport
- Country: Kenya
- Sport: Athletics
- Event: Long-distance running

Achievements and titles
- Personal bests: 800m: 2:02.10 (Padua 2022); 1500 m: 4:01.25 (Hungary 2023); 3000m: 8:44.08 (Rovereto 2022); 5km: 14:57 (Lille 2023)
Medal record
Women's athletics
Representing Kenya
World Junior Championships
Gold medal – first place	2022 Cali	1500 m
World Cross Country Championships
Gold medal – first place	2023 Bathurst	Mixed relay

Brenda Chebet (born 16 March 2004) is a Kenyan track and field athlete. She won Gold at the 1500 metres at the 2022 World Athletics U20 Championships. In February 2023 she won a gold medal in the mixed relay at the 2023 World Athletics Cross Country Championships.

In December 2023, Chebet was banned from elite competition for three years for doping, following a positive test for methasterone on 8 July. Her results starting from 8 July were disqualified, and her ban was given from 3 September 2023 to 2 September 2026.

== Career ==
In June 2022 Chebet finished fourth in the African Championship 1500m race, held in Saint Pierre, Mauritius. She followed that up a few days later with sixth place in the women's 800m final.

Chebet won the gold medal in the 1500 metres at the 2022 World Athletics U20 Championships in Cali, Colombia in August 2022 (originally finished second behind Birke Haylom, but Haylom was later given an two-year ban for age falsification violations and stripped of her gold medal). Chebet ran a personal best time and a championship best of 4:04.64 .

In February 2023 she won a gold medal in the mixed relay at the 2023 World Athletics Cross Country Championships, held in Bathurst, Australia. Her Kenyan team completed the course in 23:14, with Chebet racing alongside Emmanuel Wanyonyi, Mirriam Cherop, and Kyumbe Munguti. Chebet ran the anchor leg.
