= 2018 African Championships in Athletics – Women's 800 metres =

The women's 800 metres event at the 2018 African Championships in Athletics was held on 4 and 5 August in Asaba, Nigeria.

== Medalists ==
Gold	Silver	Bronze
Caster Semenya; South Africa	Francine Niyonsaba; Burundi	Habitam Alemu; Ethiopia

== Results ==
=== Heats ===
Qualification: First 2 of each heat (Q) and the next 2 fastest (q) qualified for the final.

Rank	Heat	Name	Nationality	Time	Notes
1	2	Malika Akkaoui	Morocco	2:01.36	Q
2	2	Francine Niyonsaba	Burundi	2:01.63	Q
3	2	Noelie Yarigo	Benin	2:02.05	q
4	3	Habitam Alemu	Ethiopia	2:02.51	Q
5	3	Halimah Nakaayi	Uganda	2:02.54	Q
6	1	Winnie Nanyondo	Uganda	2:02.66	Q
7	2	Margaret Wambui	Kenya	2:02.80	q
8	1	Caster Semenya	South Africa	2:02.90	Q
9	3	Eunice Sum	Kenya	2:03.38	
10	1	Emily Cherotich	Kenya	2:03.40	
11	3	Amna Bakhait	Sudan	2:04.44	
12	3	Abike Funmilola Egbeniyi	Nigeria	2:04.67	
13	1	Diribe Welteji	Ethiopia	2:04.77	
14	2	Kore Tola	Ethiopia	2:05.87	
15	3	Khadija Benkassem	Morocco	2:08.35	
16	2	Liliane Nguetsa	Cameroon	2:08.41	
17	2	Tsepang Sello	Lesotho	2:09.03	
18	1	Maryjoy Mudyiravanji	Zimbabwe	2:11.62	
19	1	Violette Ndayikengurukiye	Burundi	2:11.89	
20	1	Semira Mebrahtu	Eritrea	2:12.19	
21	3	Souhra Ali Med	Djibouti	2:13.09	
	1	Rababe Arafi	Morocco	DNF	
	3	Carla Mendes	Cape Verde	DNS	

=== Final ===
Rank	Athlete	Nationality	Time	Notes
1st place, gold medalist(s)	Caster Semenya	South Africa	1:56.06	CR
2nd place, silver medalist(s)	Francine Niyonsaba	Burundi	1:57.97	
3rd place, bronze medalist(s)	Habitam Alemu	Ethiopia	1:58.86	
4	Halimah Nakaayi	Uganda	1:58.90	
5	Winnie Nanyondo	Uganda	1:59.41	
6	Malika Akkaoui	Morocco	2:00.01	
7	Noelie Yarigo	Benin	2:04.36	
	Margaret Wambui	Kenya	DNF	
