= Athletics at the 2018 Commonwealth Games – Women's 800 metres =

Women's 800 metres at the 2018 Commonwealth Games
- Venue: Carrara Stadium
- Dates: 12 April (heats); 13 April (final)
- Competitors: 26 from 17 nations
- Winning time: 1:56.68 GR

Medalists
gold medal	Caster Semenya	South Africa
silver medal	Margaret Wambui	Kenya
bronze medal	Natoya Goule	Jamaica

The women's 800 metres at the 2018 Commonwealth Games, as part of the athletics programme, took place in the Carrara Stadium on 12 and 13 April 2018.

== Records ==
Prior to this competition, the existing world and Games records were as follows:

World record	Jarmila Kratochvílová (TCH)	1:53.28	Munich, Germany	26 July 1983
Games record	Maria Mutola (MOZ)	1:57.35	Manchester, England	29 July 2002

== Schedule ==
The schedule was as follows:

Date	Time	Round
Thursday 12 April 2018	12:20	First round
Friday 13 April 2018	20:45	Final

All times are Australian Eastern Standard Time (UTC+10)

== Results ==
=== First round ===
The first round consisted of three heats. The two fastest competitors per heat (plus two fastest losers) advanced to the final.

Heat 1

Rank	Lane	Name	Result	Notes	Qual.
1	6	Caster Semenya (RSA)	1:59.26		Q
2	4	Alexandra Bell (ENG)	2:00.11	PB	Q
3	1	Eglay Nalyanya (KEN)	2:00.28	PB	q
4	7	Dorcus Ajok (UGA)	2:00.53		q
5	3	Angie Petty (NZL)	2:00.62		
6	2	Keely Small (AUS)	2:00.81	PB	
7	5	Natalia Evangelidou (CYP)	2:01.77	NR	
8	8	Gayanthika Abeyratne (SRI)	2:04.72		
9	7	Mariama Coneth (SLE)	2:16.57		

Heat 2

Rank	Lane	Name	Result	Notes	Qual.
1	2	Margaret Wambui (KEN)	2:00.60		Q
2	7	Natoya Goule (JAM)	2:00.74		Q
3	8	Shelayna Oskan-Clarke (ENG)	2:00.81		
4	3	Brittany McGowan (AUS)	2:01.17		
5	6	Halimah Nakaayi (UGA)	2:01.69		
6	7	Agnes Abu (GHA)	2:02.50	PB	
7	5	Ciara Mageean (NIR)	2:03.30		
8	1	Tsepang Sello (LES)	2:06.54		
9	4	Valentine Hello (VAN)	2:18.26		

Heat 3

Rank	Lane	Name	Result	Notes	Qual.
1	7	Emily Cherotich Tuei (KEN)	2:00.58		Q
2	6	Winnie Nanyondo (UGA)	2:00.69		Q
3	3	Georgia Griffith (AUS)	2:00.73	PB	
4	2	Lynsey Sharp (SCO)	2:01.33		
5	1	Alena Brooks (TTO)	2:01.81	NR	
6	8	Adelle Tracey (ENG)	2:02.03		
7	5	Nimali W.K.L. Arachchige (SRI)	2:08.52		
8	4	Alice Ishimwe (RWA)	2:11.36	PB	

=== Final ===
The medals were determined in the final.

Rank	Lane	Name	Result	Notes
1st place, gold medalist(s)	5	Caster Semenya (RSA)	1:56.68	GR
2nd place, silver medalist(s)	4	Margaret Wambui (KEN)	1:58.07	
3rd place, bronze medalist(s)	1	Natoya Goule (JAM)	1:58.82	PB
4	8	Winnie Nanyondo (UGA)	2:00.36	
5	7	Alexandra Bell (ENG)	2:00.83	
6	3	Dorcus Ajok (UGA)	2:01.22	
7	6	Emily Cherotich Tuei (KEN)	2:01.74	
8	2	Eglay Nalyanya (KEN)	2:03.08	
