= Athletics at the 2019 African Games – Women's 800 metres =

The women's 800 metres event at the 2019 African Games was held on 26 and 27 August in Rabat.

== Medalists ==
| Gold | Silver | Bronze |
|---|---|---|
| Hirut Meshesha; Ethiopia | Rababe Arafi; Morocco | Halimah Nakaayi; Uganda |

== Results ==
=== Heats ===
Qualification: First 2 in each heat (Q) and the next 2 fastest (q) advanced to the final.

| Rank | Heat | Name | Nationality | Time | Notes |
|---|---|---|---|---|---|
| 1 | 3 | Halimah Nakaayi | Uganda | 2:02.44 | Q |
| 2 | 3 | Malika Akkaoui | Morocco | 2:03.57 | Q |
| 3 | 3 | Noélie Yarigo | Benin | 2:04.10 | q |
| 4 | 2 | Diribe Welteji | Ethiopia | 2:04.47 | Q |
| 5 | 2 | Halima Hachlaf | Morocco | 2:04.58 | Q |
| 6 | 1 | Hirut Meshesha | Ethiopia | 2:04.74 | Q |
| 7 | 1 | Rababe Arafi | Morocco | 2:04.75 | Q |
| 8 | 3 | Souhra Ali Med | Djibouti | 2:05.12 | q |
| 9 | 2 | Naomi Korir | Kenya | 2:05.17 | |
| 10 | 1 | Eglay Nafuna Nalyanya | Kenya | 2:05.54 | |
| 11 | 3 | Freweyni Hailu | Ethiopia | 2:05.73 | |
| 12 | 2 | Haifa Tarchoun | Tunisia | 2:07.28 | |
| 13 | 2 | Oratile Nowe | Botswana | 2:08.78 | |
| 14 | 2 | Carla Mendes | Cape Verde | 2:09.96 | |
| 15 | 1 | Tsepang Sello | Lesotho | 2:11.53 | |
| 16 | 1 | Violette Ndayikengurukiye | Burundi | 2:12.08 | |
| 17 | 3 | Habibatou Bamba | Mali | 2:12.82 | |
| 18 | 1 | Regina Deogratius Mpigachai | Tanzania | 2:13.19 | |
| 19 | 1 | Nyat Ghebreslassie | Eritrea | 2:19.57 | |
| 20 | 1 | Stella Stella | South Sudan | 2:32.39 | |
| | 2 | Neide Dias | Angola | DNS | |
| | 3 | Nelly Jepkosgei | Kenya | DNS | |

=== Final ===
| Rank | Name | Nationality | Time | Notes |
|---|---|---|---|---|
| 1st place, gold medalist(s) | Hirut Meshesha | Ethiopia | 2:03.16 | |
| 2nd place, silver medalist(s) | Rababe Arafi | Morocco | 2:03.20 | |
| 3rd place, bronze medalist(s) | Halimah Nakaayi | Uganda | 2:03.55 | |
| 4 | Malika Akkaoui | Morocco | 2:03.78 | |
| 5 | Halima Hachlaf | Morocco | 2:03.82 | |
| 6 | Diribe Welteji | Ethiopia | 2:04.20 | |
| 7 | Noélie Yarigo | Benin | 2:04.66 | |
| 8 | Souhra Ali Med | Djibouti | 2:05.99 | |
