= Halimah Nakaayi =

Ugandan middle-distance runner (born 1994)

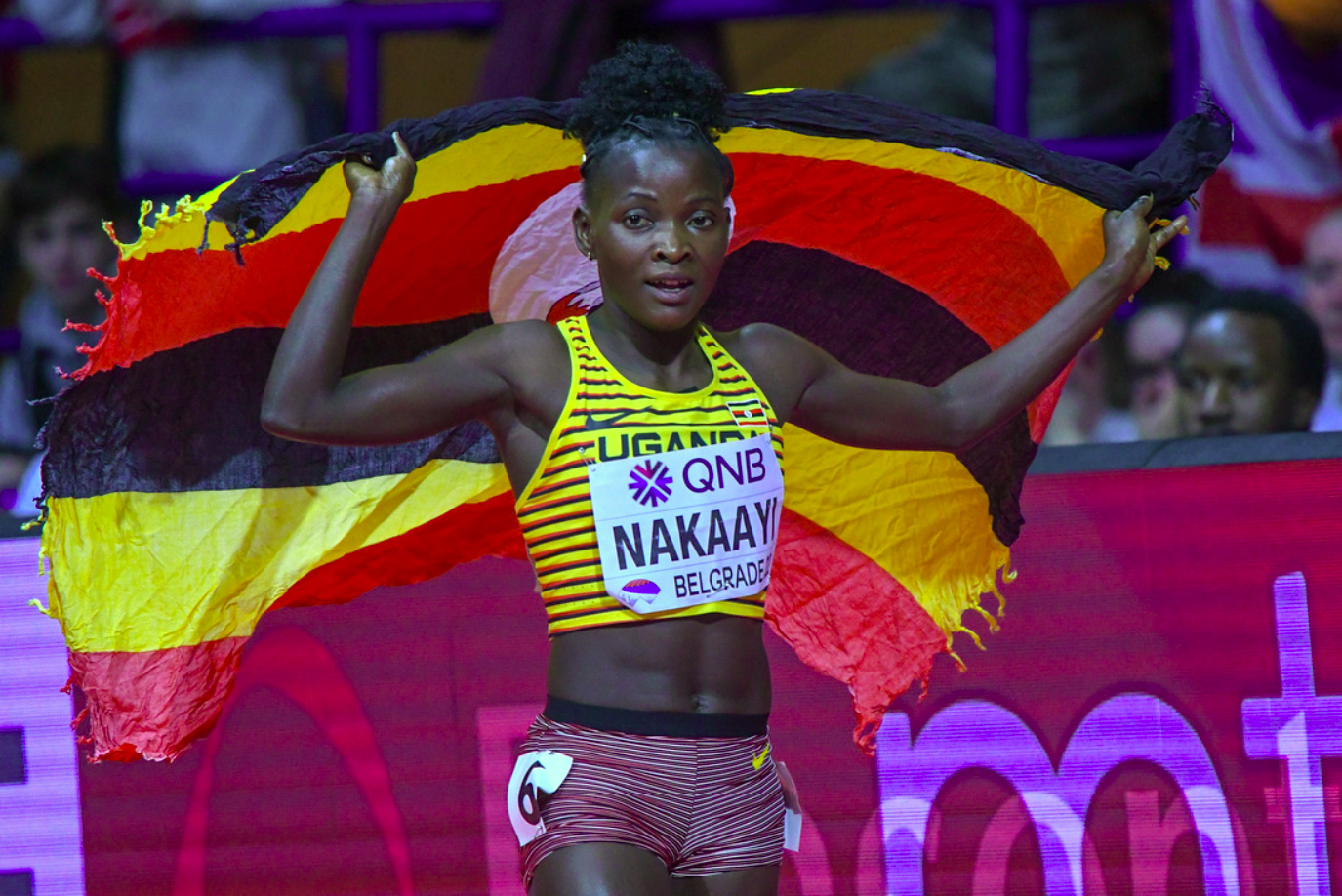
- Nakaayi at the 2022 World Indoor Championships in Belgrade

Personal information
- Born: 16 October 1994 (age 31) Seeta, Mukono, Uganda
- Education: Kampala University

Sport
- Country: Uganda
- Sport: Athletics
- Event: 800 metres

Achievements and titles
- Personal bests: 800 m: 1:57.26 NR (London 2024); 1000 m: 2:31.67 NR (Monaco 2025); Indoors; 800 m: 1:57.56 NR (Los Angeles 2024)
Medal record
Women's athletics
Representing Uganda
World Championships
Gold medal – first place	2019 Doha	800 m
World Indoor Championships
Bronze medal – third place	2022 Belgrade	800 m
African Games
Silver medal – second place	2023 Accra	800 m
Bronze medal – third place	2019 Rabat	800 m

Halimah Nakaayi (born 16 October 1994) is a Ugandan middle-distance runner who specialises in the 800 metres. She is the 2019 World Champion at the event and won the bronze medal at the 2022 World Indoor Championships. Nakaayi is the current Ugandan record holder for the 800 m both outdoors and indoors, and also for the 1000 metres.

She competed in the 800 m at both the 2016 Rio and 2020 Tokyo Olympics, reaching the semi-finals each time.

== Career ==
=== 2011–2017 ===
At 16, Halimah Nakaayi won the 400 metres at the 2011 Commonwealth Youth Games held in Douglas, Isle of Man.

In 2012, she ran the second 10 km leg of a marathon relay at a festival celebrating 50 years of Ugandan independence. After advancing from fifth to second, she spent four hours in a coma.

Nakaayi was the flag bearer for Uganda in the closing ceremony of the 2016 Rio Olympics.

The following year, she came second in her specialist 800 metres distance at the Islamic Solidarity Games in a time of 2:01.60. At the 2017 World Championships, Nakaayi was eliminated from the event in the semifinals, clocking 2:01.74.

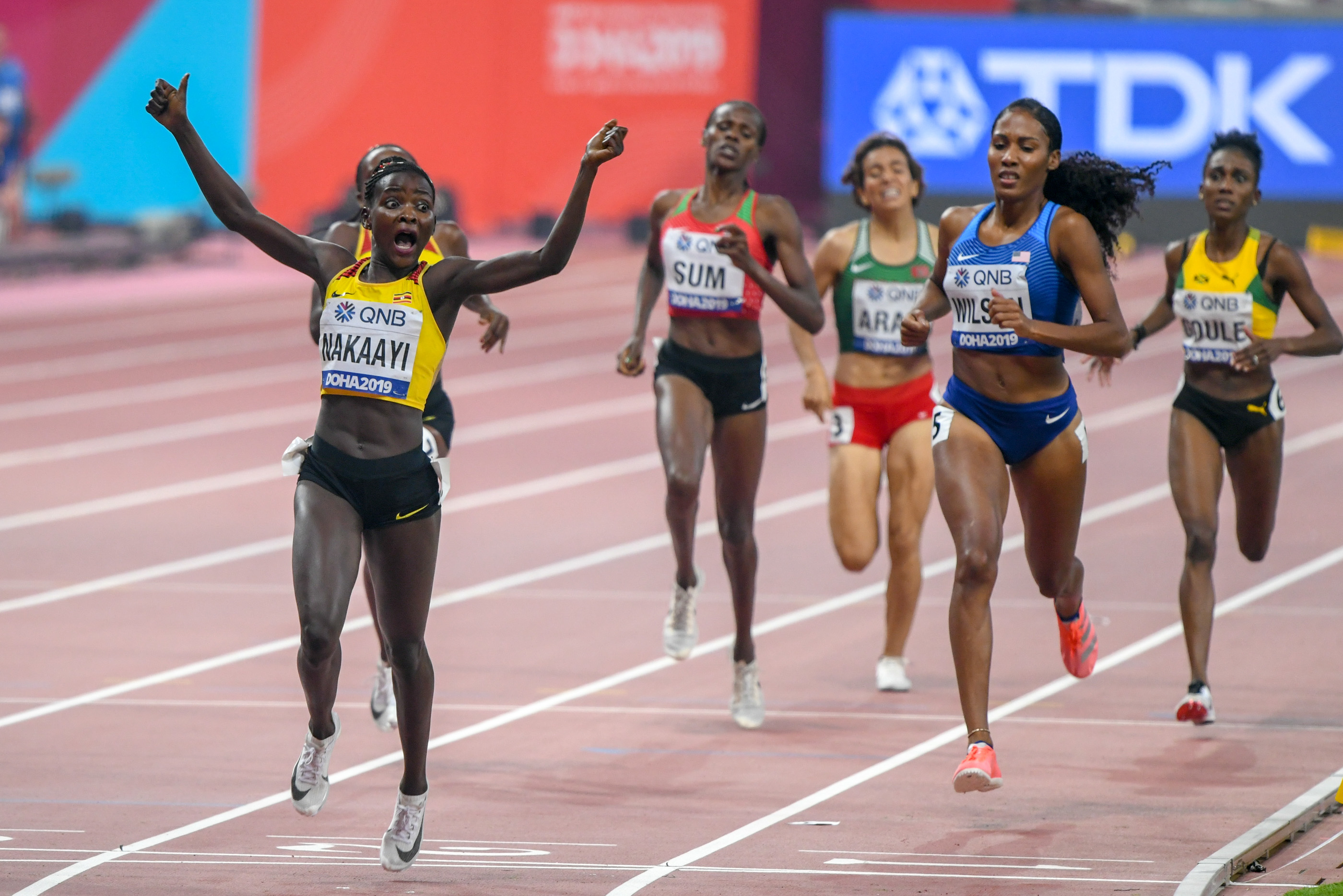
Nakaayi (L) finishes at the 2019 World Championships; Ajeé Wilson, who came third after Raevyn Rogers, on the right in blue.

=== 2018–2021: World 800 m champion ===
In 2018, she placed fourth in the 800 m at the African Championships with a time of 1:58.90. She lost to, 1–3, Caster Semenya, Francine Niyonsaba, and Habitam Alemu by only 0.04 seconds.

In August 2019, Nakaayi won the bronze medal in the event at the African Games behind Hirut Meshesha and Rababe Arafi.

The following month, she became the world 800 m champion in Doha, Qatar, improving her own Ugandan record to 1m 58.04s. She held off Raevyn Rogers, who made a late surge to claim silver in 1:58.18, while Ajeé Wilson finished third in 1:58.84. Nakaayi was joined in the final by compatriot Winnie Nanyondo in fourth.

After suffering a knee problem she reached only the semifinals at the postponed 2020 Tokyo Olympics with her time of 2:04.44 (2:00.92 in the heats).

=== 2022–present ===
Nakaayi competed in four 800m events of the World Indoor Tour and improved her Ugandan indoor record three times. Racing in Karlsruhe, Val-de-Reuil, Liévin, and Toruń, she finished in positions 1–1–2–2 respectively, with bests of 1:58.58 (Liévin, lost by 0.12s to Natoya Goule) and 1:59.55 set in France. She placed second in Toruń in a triple blanket finish with her time of 2:00.19 equalled by Ethiopia's 19-year-old Tigist Girma, and both behind Catriona Bisset who was 0.03 seconds quicker (photo finish). In March, Nakaayi won the bronze medal at the World Indoor Championships held in Belgrade in a time of 2:00.66, behind Wilson (1:59.09) and Ethiopia's Freweyni Hailu (2:00.54), who overtook Nakaayi just before the finish line. She won comfortably, however, with both Goule (4th) and Bisset (5th).

At the World Championships in Eugene, Oregon in July, she didn't make it to the final after finishing eighth in her semifinal in a time of 2:01.05. The next month, Nakaayi placed eighth in her specialist event at the Birmingham Commonwealth Games.

== International competitions ==
Representing Uganda
Year	Competition	Venue	Position	Event	Time
2010	Youth Olympic Games	Singapore	DSQ (h)	400 m	DSQ
2011	World Youth Championships	Lille, France	26th (h)	800 m	2:13.59
2011	Commonwealth Youth Games	Douglas, Isle of Man	1st	400 m	57.16
2012	World Junior Championship	Barcelona, Spain	14th (h)	800 m	2:06.38^{1}
2014	Commonwealth Games	Glasgow, United Kingdom	39th (h)	400 m	57.51
2015	Universiade	Gwangju, South Korea	21st (sf)	400 m	57.13
2015	Universiade	Gwangju, South Korea	5th	4 × 400 m relay	3:45.40
2016	African Championship	Durban, South Africa	10th (h)	800 m	2:04.97
2016	Olympic Games	Rio de Janeiro, Brazil	17th (sf)	800 m	2:00.63
2017	Islamic Solidarity Games	Baku, Azerbaijan	10th (h)	400 m	55.77
2017	Islamic Solidarity Games	Baku, Azerbaijan	2nd	800 m	2:01.60
2017	World Championships	London, United Kingdom	19th (sf)	800 m	2:01.74
2018	Commonwealth Games	Gold Coast, Australia	15th (h)	800 m	2:01.69
2018	Commonwealth Games	Gold Coast, Australia	8th	4 × 400 m relay	3:35.03
2018	African Championships	Asaba, Nigeria	4th	800 m	1:58.90
2019	African Games	Rabat, Morocco	3rd	800 m	2:03.55
2019	World Championships	Doha, Qatar	1st	800 m	1:58.04
2021	Olympic Games	Tokyo, Japan	24th (sf)	800 m	2:04.44
2022	World Indoor Championships	Belgrade, Serbia	3rd	800 m i	2:00.66
2022	World Championships	Eugene, United States	19th (sf)	800 m	2:01.05
2022	Commonwealth Games	Birmingham, United Kingdom	8th	800 m	2:01.17
2023	World Championships	Budapest, Hungary	8th	800 m	1:59.18
2024	World Indoor Championships	Glasgow, United Kingdom	6th	800 m	2:05.53
2024	African Games	Accra, Ghana	2nd	800 m	1:58.59
2024	African Games	Accra, Ghana	5th	1500 m	4:09.40
2024	Olympic Games	Paris, France	19th (rep)	800 m	2:02.88
2025	World Indoor Championships	Nanjing, China	14th (h)	800 m	2:04.57
2025	Islamic Solidarity Games	Riyadh, Saudi Arabia	2nd	800 m	2:03.14
2026	Commonwealth Games	Glasgow, United Kingdom	14th (sf)	800 m	2:03.36
2026	World Ultimate Championship	Budapest, Hungary	15th (h)	800 m	2:02.62

^{1}Disqualified in the final

== Personal bests ==
- 400 metres – 53.02 (Kampala 2017)
- 800 metres – 1:57.26 (London 2024) NR
  - 800 metres indoor – 1:58.58 (Liévin 2022) NR
- 1000 metres – 2:32.12 (Monaco 2020) NR
