= Athletics at the 2016 Summer Olympics – Women's 800 metres =

Women's 800 metres at the Games of the XXXI Olympiad
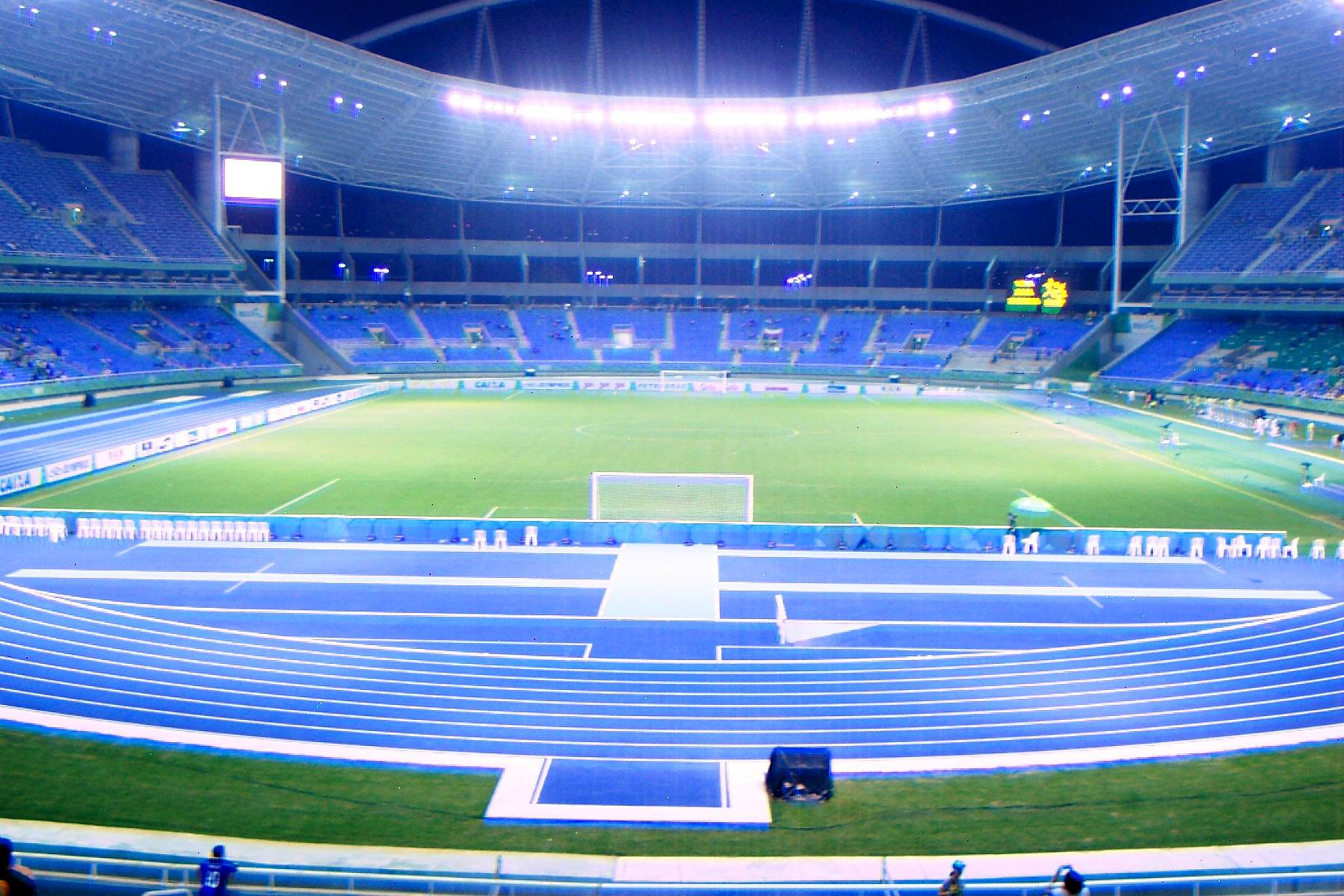
- Interior view of the Estádio Olímpico João Havelange, where the Women's 800m took place.
- Venue: Olympic Stadium
- Dates: 17 August 2016 (heats); 18 August 2016 (semifinals); 20 August 2016 (final)
- Winning time: 1:55.28 NR

Medalists
1st place, gold medalist(s)		Caster Semenya	South Africa
2nd place, silver medalist(s)		Francine Niyonsaba	Burundi
3rd place, bronze medalist(s)		Margaret Wambui	Kenya

Video on YouTube Official Video Highlights

The women's 800 metres event at the 2016 Summer Olympics took place between 17–20 August at the Olympic Stadium.

== Summary ==
As the final started, Caster Semenya running in lane 3 gained a slight edge on the turn, deceptive as Margaret Wambui in lane 4 was the slowest around the turn. Francine Niyonsaba converged from lane 5 and the two assumed the lead down the backstretch. Semenya taking the curb as they began the turn, Niyonsaba on her outside shoulder with Maryna Arzamasava behind Niyonsaba, Melissa Bishop and Lynsey Sharp stacking up behind Semenya. In the second 200, Margaret Wambui moved to the outside of lane 2 and ran up to Arzamasava's shoulder. The first lap was an honest 57.59. Midway through the penultimate turn, Niyonsaba edged in front of Semenya, the other runners collapsing into lane 1 rather than following her around the now open outside. Down the backstretch, Niyonsaba opened a 2-metre lead, with Bishop cuing up tight behind Semenya, with Arzamasava boxing her to the outside, while Arzamasava was being boxed by a faster moving Wambui. Kicker Joanna Jóźwik was trailing the field eight metres back of Niyonsaba. After the final turn had started, Semenya drifted to the outside and put it in gear, moving from 2 metres behind Niyonsaba to 2 metres in front. During the home stretch she just extended her lead to an 8-metre victory. Still in second, Niyonsaba had a 2-metre gap on Bishop with Wambui on her outside. Down the homestretch Niyonsaba also extended her gap to about four metres. Wambui down a metre on the outside of Bishop, couldn't make any progress until the last 40 metres, when she finally pulled aside and then past for the bronze medal by a metre.

For Semenya, her 1:55.28 was a new South African National Record, a .05 improvement over the mark she set a month earlier at Herculis. For Bishop it was also a Canadian National Record, improving upon the mark she set the same day as Semenya in Edmonton. Semenya becomes the fifth woman to win two medals in the Women's Olympic 800. Since the disqualification of Mariya Savinova from 2012, she has become the first two time gold medalist.

The medals were presented by Barbara Kendall, IOC member, New Zealand and Hamad Kalkaba Malboum, Vice President of the IAAF.

== Testosterone ==
Following the race, Team GB's Lynsey Sharp said that female athletes are effectively competing in "two separate races." Sharp, Canada's Melissa Bishop and Poland's Joanna Jóźwik embraced after the race. "We see each other week in, week out, so we know how each other feel."

IAAF General Secretary Pierre Weisse said of Semenya, "She is a woman, but maybe not 100 per cent."

According to testing by World Athletics, all three medalists had the 46,XY karyotype and produced levels of testosterone in the male range. The IAAF has subsequently ruled that this gives them an unfair advantage. On May 8, 2019, the IAAF testosterone rule went into effect. Such athletes will be required to take testosterone suppressing drugs in order to compete in female athletic categories.

== Competition format ==
The women's 800m competition consisted of heats (Round 1), semifinals and a final. Twenty-four athletes advanced from the heats to the semifinal round. The top two competitors from each of the eight heats qualified for the semifinals along with the eight fastest losers. A total of eight competitors qualified for the final from the semifinals. In the three semifinal races, the first two from each semifinal advanced to the final along with the two fastest losers.

== Records ==
Prior to the competition, the existing World and Olympic records were as follows.

World record	Jarmila Kratochvílová (TCH)	1:53.28	Munich, West Germany	26 July 1983
Olympic record	Nadiya Olizarenko (URS)	1:53.43	Moscow, Soviet Union	27 July 1980
2016 World leading	Caster Semenya (RSA)	1:55.33	Fontvieille, Monaco	15 July 2016

The following national records were established during the competition:

Country	Athlete	Round	Time	Notes
Central African Republic	Elisabeth Mandaba (CAF)	Heats	2:11.70	
South Africa	Caster Semenya (RSA)	Final	1:55.28	
Canada	Melissa Bishop (CAN)	Final	1:57.02	
Iceland	Aníta Hinriksdóttir (ISL)	Heats	2:00.14	

== Schedule ==
All times are Brasilia Time (UTC-3)

Date	Time	Round
Wednesday, 17 August 2016	10:55	Heats
Thursday, 18 August 2016	21:15	Semifinals
Saturday, 20 August 2016	21:15	Finals

== Results ==
=== Heats ===
Progression rules: First 2 in each heat (Q) and the next 8 fastest (q) advance to the Semifinals

==== Heat 1 ====
Rank	Lane	Athlete	Nation	Time	Notes
1	4	Lynsey Sharp	Great Britain	2:00.83	Q
2	1	Amela Terzić	Serbia	2:00.99	Q, SB
3	6	Sahily Diago	Cuba	2:01.38	
4	8	Angela Petty	New Zealand	2:02.40	
5	7	Justine Fedronic	France	2:02.73	
6	2	Olha Lyakhova	Ukraine	2:03.02	
7	3	Florina Pierdevară	Romania	2:03.32	
8	5	Ciara Everard	Ireland	2:07.91	

==== Heat 2 ====
Rank	Lane	Athlete	Nation	Time	Notes
1	4	Caster Semenya	South Africa	1:59.31	Q
2	8	Ajee' Wilson	United States	1:59.44	Q, SB
3	5	Shelayna Oskan-Clarke	Great Britain	1:59.67	q
4	3	Wang Chunyu	China	1:59.93	q PB
5	1	Margarita Mukasheva	Kazakhstan	2:00.97	
6	2	Claudia Bobocea	Romania	2:03.75	
7	7a	Rose Nathike Lokonyen	Refugee Olympic Team	2:16.64	
8	7b	Houleye Ba	Mauritania	2:43.52	
–	6	Rababe Arafi	Morocco	—N/a	DNF

==== Heat 3 ====
Rank	Lane	Athlete	Nation	Time	Notes
1	2	Selina Büchel	Switzerland	1:59.00	Q, SB
2	6	Margaret Wambui	Kenya	1:59.66	Q
3	4	Nataliya Pryshchepa	Ukraine	1:59.80	q
4	7	Gudaf Tsegay	Ethiopia	2:00.13	
5	5	Sifan Hassan	Netherlands	2:00.27	SB
6	3	Tintu Lukka	India	2:00.58	SB
7	8	Selma Kajan	Australia	2:05.20	
8	1	Tsepang Sello	Lesotho	2:10.22	

==== Heat 4 ====
Rank	Lane	Athlete	Nation	Time	Notes
1	3	Melissa Bishop	Canada	1:58.38	Q
2	4	Maryna Arzamasava	Belarus	1:58.44	Q, SB
3	5	Habitam Alemu	Ethiopia	1:58.99	q, PB
4	7	Noélie Yarigo	Benin	1:59.12	q
5	2	Halimah Nakaayi	Uganda	1:59.78	q, PB
6	8	Aníta Hinriksdóttir	Iceland	2:00.14	NR
7	1	Christina Hering	Germany	2:01.04	
8	6	Fatma El Sharnouby	Egypt	2:21.24	

==== Heat 5 ====
Rank	Lane	Athlete	Nation	Time	Notes
1	3	Eunice Jepkoech Sum	Kenya	1:59.83	Q
2	2	Nataliia Lupu	Ukraine	1:59.91	Q
3	7	Kate Grace	United States	1:59.96	q
4	8	Renée Eykens	Belgium	2:00.00	q, PB
5	1	Tigist Assefa	Ethiopia	2:00.21	SB
6	6	Winnie Nanyondo	Uganda	2:02.77	
7	4	Amna Bakhit	Sudan	2:07.65	
8	5	Swe Li Myint Myint	Myanmar	2:16.98	

==== Heat 6 ====
Rank	Lane	Athlete	Nation	Time	Notes
1	3	Angelika Cichocka	Poland	2:00.42	Q
2	1	Yusneysi Santiusti	Italy	2:00.45	Q
3	4	Rose Mary Almanza	Cuba	2:00.50	
4	8	Malika Akkaoui	Morocco	2:00.52	
5	7	Hedda Hynne	Norway	2:01.64	
6	2	Déborah Rodríguez	Uruguay	2:01.86	SB
7	5	Simoya Campbell	Jamaica	2:02.07	
8	6	Charline Mathias	Luxembourg	2:09.30	

==== Heat 7 ====
Rank	Lane	Athlete	Nation	Time	Notes
1	1	Joanna Jóźwik	Poland	2:01.58	Q
2	6	Winny Chebet	Kenya	2:01.65	Q
3	8	Esther Guerrero	Spain	2:01.85	
4	4	Lisneidy Veitia	Cuba	2:02.10	
5	2	Rénelle Lamote	France	2:02.19	
6	5	Eglė Balčiūnaitė	Lithuania	2:02.98	SB
7	7	Kenia Sinclair	Jamaica	2:03.76	
8	3	Flávia de Lima	Brazil	2:03.78	SB

==== Heat 8 ====
Rank	Lane	Athlete	Nation	Time	Notes
1	4	Francine Niyonsaba	Burundi	1:59.84	Q
2	5	Lovisa Lindh	Sweden	2:00.04	Q, PB
3	8	Natoya Goule	Jamaica	2:00.49	
4	3	Lucia Hrivnák Klocová	Slovakia	2:00.57	SB
5	7	Yuliya Karol	Belarus	2:01.09	PB
6	2	Chrishuna Williams	United States	2:01.19	
7	1	Fabienne Kohlmann	Germany	2:05.36	
8	6	Elisabeth Mandaba	Central African Republic	2:11.70	NR

=== Semifinals ===
Progression rules: First 2 in each heat (Q) and the next 2 fastest (q) advance to the Final

==== Semifinal 1 ====
Rank	Lane	Athlete	Nation	Time	Notes
1	3	Margaret Wambui	Kenya	1:59.21	Q
2	6	Francine Niyonsaba	Burundi	1:59.59	Q
3	7	Ajee' Wilson	United States	1:59.75	
4	4	Nataliya Pryshchepa	Ukraine	1:59.95	
5	1	Renée Eykens	Belgium	2:00.45	
6	8	Halimah Nakaayi	Uganda	2:00.63	
7	2	Yusneysi Santiusti	Italy	2:00.80	
8	5	Angelika Cichocka	Poland	2:01.29	

==== Semifinal 2 ====
Rank	Lane	Athlete	Nation	Time	Notes
1	1	Joanna Jóźwik	Poland	1:58.93	Q, SB
2	4	Melissa Bishop	Canada	1:59.05	Q
3	5	Selina Büchel	Switzerland	1:59.35	
4	2	Lovisa Lindh	Sweden	1:59.41	PB
5	7	Shelayna Oskan-Clarke	Great Britain	1:59.45	SB
6	6	Habitam Alemu	Ethiopia	2:00.07	
7	3	Eunice Jepkoech Sum	Kenya	2:00.88	
8	8	Nataliia Lupu	Ukraine	2:02.10	

==== Semifinal 3 ====
Rank	Lane	Athlete	Nation	Time	Notes
1	5	Caster Semenya	South Africa	1:58.15	Q
2	4	Lynsey Sharp	Great Britain	1:58.65	Q
3	6	Kate Grace	United States	1:58.79	q, PB
4	3	Maryna Arzamasava	Belarus	1:58.87	q
5	8	Noélie Yarigo	Benin	1:59.78	
6	7	Winny Chebet	Kenya	2:01.90	
7	2	Amela Terzić	Serbia	2:03.81	
8	1	Wang Chunyu	China	2:04.05	

=== Final ===
Rank	Lane	Athlete	Nation	Time	Notes
1st place, gold medalist(s)	3	Caster Semenya	South Africa	1:55.28	NR
2nd place, silver medalist(s)	5	Francine Niyonsaba	Burundi	1:56.49	
3rd place, bronze medalist(s)	4	Margaret Wambui	Kenya	1:56.89	PB
4	6	Melissa Bishop	Canada	1:57.02	NR
5	2	Joanna Jóźwik	Poland	1:57.37	PB
6	7	Lynsey Sharp	Great Britain	1:57.69	PB
7	8	Maryna Arzamasava	Belarus	1:59.10	
8	1	Kate Grace	United States	1:59.57	
