= 2014 African Championships in Athletics – Women's 800 metres =

The women's 800 metres event at the 2014 African Championships in Athletics was held August 13–14 on Stade de Marrakech.

== Medalists ==
Gold	Silver	Bronze
Eunice Jepkoech Sum; Kenya	Janeth Jepkosgei; Kenya	Agatha Jeruto; Kenya

== Results ==
=== Heats ===
Qualification: First 2 of each heat (Q) and the next 2 fastest (q) qualified for the final.

Rank	Heat	Name	Nationality	Time	Notes
1	2	Agatha Jeruto	Kenya	1:59.88	Q
2	2	Malika Akkaoui	Morocco	2:00.84	Q
3	3	Tigist Assefa	Ethiopia	2:00.94	Q
4	3	Janeth Jepkosgei	Kenya	2:01.13	Q
5	2	Noelie Yarigo	Benin	2:02.09	q
6	1	Eunice Jepkoech Sum	Kenya	2:02.43	Q
7	2	Selam Abrhaley	Ethiopia	2:02.64	q
8	1	Lydiya Melese	Ethiopia	2:03.15	Q
9	2	Martha Bissah	Ghana	2:06.32	
10	1	Abiye David	Nigeria	2:08.58	
11	3	Liliane Nguetsa	Cameroon	2:09.00	
12	1	Annabelle Lascar	Mauritius	2:11.56	
13	3	Haifa Tarchoun	Tunisia	2:16.44	
14	1	Lea Manirankunda	Burundi	2:19.98	
15	1	Sarah Nguiet	Republic of the Congo	2:33.44	
	3	Oumou Diarra	Mali	DQ	R163.5
	1	Sara Souhi	Morocco	DNF	
	3	Siham Hilali	Morocco	DNF	
	2	Felismina Cavela	Angola	DNS	
	2	Winnie Nanyondo	Uganda	DNS	
	3	Mireille Tshakwiza	Democratic Republic of the Congo	DNS	

=== Final ===
Rank	Name	Nationality	Time	Notes
1st place, gold medalist(s)	Eunice Jepkoech Sum	Kenya	1:59.45	
2nd place, silver medalist(s)	Janeth Jepkosgei	Kenya	1:59.74	
3rd place, bronze medalist(s)	Agatha Jeruto	Kenya	1:59.84	
4	Tigist Assefa	Ethiopia	2:00.43	
5	Noelie Yarigo	Benin	2:01.64	
6	Malika Akkaoui	Morocco	2:02.63	
7	Selam Abrhaley	Ethiopia	2:03.03	
8	Lydiya Melese	Ethiopia	2:03.52	
