= 2016 African Championships in Athletics – Women's 800 metres =

The women's 800 metres event at the 2016 African Championships in Athletics was held on 25 and 26 June in Kings Park Stadium.

== Medalists ==
Gold	Silver	Bronze
Caster Semenya; South Africa	Malika Akkaoui; Morocco	Emily Cherotich; Kenya

== Results ==
=== Heats ===
Qualification: First 2 of each heat (Q) and the next 2 fastest (q) qualified for the final.

Rank	Heat	Name	Nationality	Time	Notes
1	1	Caster Semenya	South Africa	2:02.01	Q
2	1	Rabab Arafi	Morocco	2:02.32	Q
3	1	Amina Bakhit	Sudan	2:02.44	q
4	1	Noélie Yarigo	Benin	2:02.94	q
5	3	Emily Cherotich	Kenya	2:03.35	Q
6	3	Malika Akkaoui	Morocco	2:03.36	Q
7	2	Sylivia Chematui Chesebe	Kenya	2:03.96	Q
8	1	Tigist Ketema	Ethiopia	2:04.61	
9	2	Lidya Melese	Ethiopia	2:04.83	Q
10	1	Halima Nakaayi	Uganda	2:04.97	
11	2	Agnes Abu	Ghana	2:05.64	
12	3	Dinke Firdisa	Ethiopia	2:06.52	
13	2	Liza Kellerman	South Africa	2:07.82	
14	2	Tarchoun Hayfa	Tunisia	2:09.49	
15	1	Violette Ndayikengurukiye	Burundi	2:10.11	
16	3	Tsepang Sello	Lesotho	2:15.03	
17	3	Sounia Hamdan	Sudan	2:17.87	
18	2	Maryjoy Mudyiravanji	Zimbabwe	2:20.75	
	2	Fiori Asmelasha	Eritrea	DQ	
	1	Salmi Nduuviteko	Namibia	DNS	
	1	Espe Bandu	Democratic Republic of the Congo	DNS	
	2	Alawia Andal	Sudan	DNS	
	2	Siham Hilali	Morocco	DNS	
	3	Leonce Missamou Bafoundissa	Republic of the Congo	DNS	
	3	Umanas Saleman	South Sudan	DNS	
	3	Elizabeth Mandaba	Central African Republic	DNS	

=== Final ===
Rank	Athlete	Nationality	Time	Notes
1st place, gold medalist(s)	Caster Semenya	South Africa	1:58.20	
2nd place, silver medalist(s)	Malika Akkaoui	Morocco	2:00.24	
3rd place, bronze medalist(s)	Emily Cherotich	Kenya	2:00.70	
4	Sylivia Chematui Chesebe	Kenya	2:01.43	
5	Rabab Arafi	Morocco	2:01.49	
6	Noélie Yarigo	Benin	2:02.68	
7	Amina Bakhit	Sudan	2:02.83	
8	Lidya Melese	Ethiopia	2:04.89	
