= 2018 African Championships in Athletics – Women's 1500 metres =

The women's 1500 metres event at the 2018 African Championships in Athletics was held on 3 August in Asaba, Nigeria.

== Results ==
Rank	Athlete	Nationality	Time	Notes
1st place, gold medalist(s)	Winny Chebet	Kenya	4:14.02	
2nd place, silver medalist(s)	Rababe Arafi	Morocco	4:14.12	
3rd place, bronze medalist(s)	Malika Akkaoui	Morocco	4:14.17	
4	Besu Sado	Ethiopia	4:15.74	
5	Winnie Nanyondo	Uganda	4:16.55	
6	Judy Kiyeng	Kenya	4:17.26	
7	Mary Kuria	Kenya	4:17.70	
8	Beatha Nishimwe	Rwanda	4:19.55	
9	Semira Mebrahtu	Eritrea	4:27.17	
10	Tsepang Sello	Lesotho	4:27.64	
11	Carla Mendes	Cape Verde	4:29.10	
12	Aminata Ngalula	Democratic Republic of the Congo	4:31.69	
13	Rahel Daniel	Eritrea	5:07.72	
	Liliane Nguetsa	Cameroon	DNS	
	Axumawit Embaye	Ethiopia	DNS	
	Habiba Ghribi	Tunisia	DNS	
