= Athletics at the 2014 Commonwealth Games – Women's 800 metres =

Women's 800 metres at the Commonwealth Games

The Women's 800 metres at the 2014 Commonwealth Games, as part of the athletics programme, was held at Hampden Park between 30 July and 1 August 2014.

== Results ==
=== Heats ===
==== Heat 1 ====
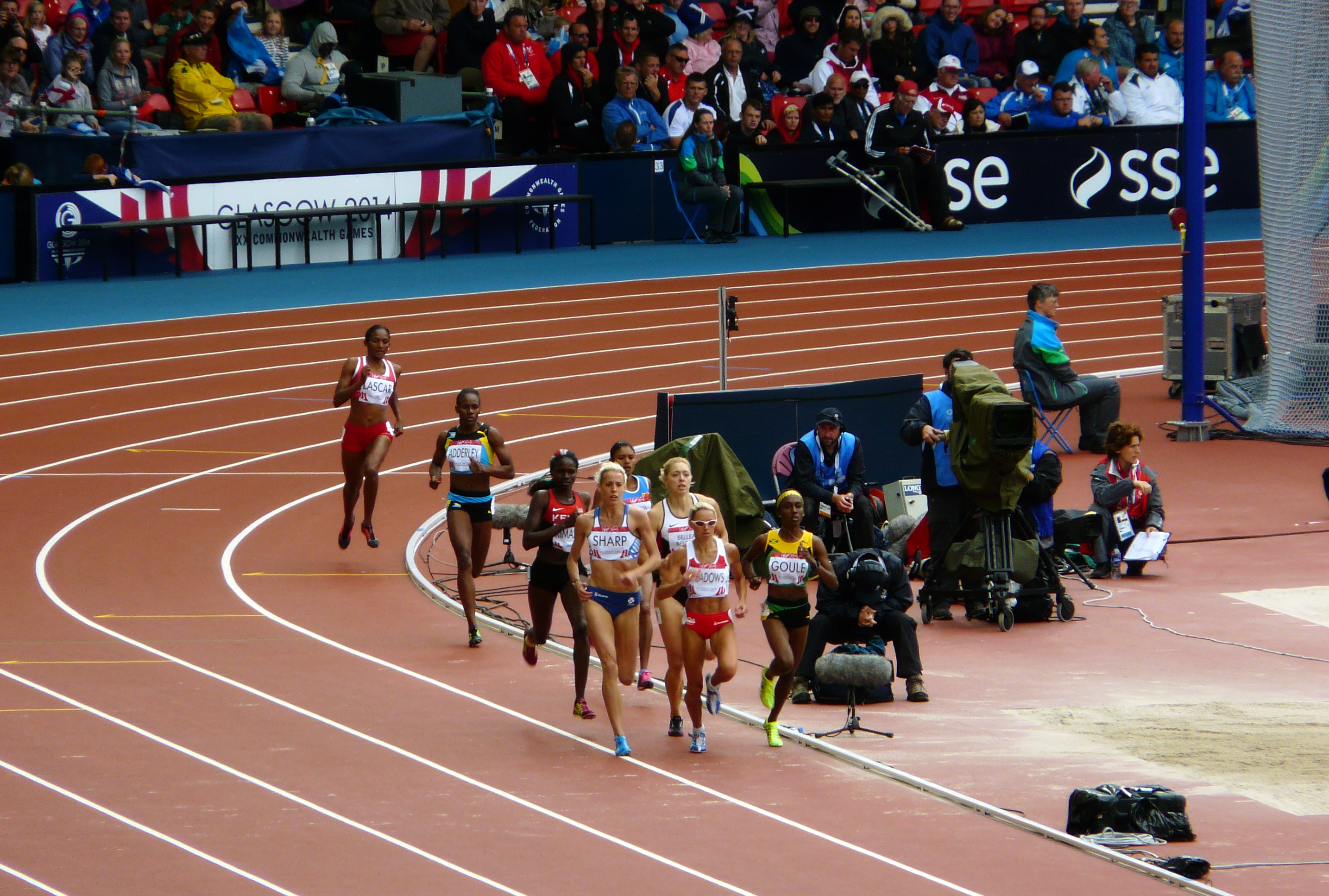
Heat 1

Rank	Order	Name	Result	Notes	Qual.
1	7	Jennifer Meadows (ENG)	2:02.53		Q
2	3	Lynsey Sharp (SCO)	2:03.04		Q
3	6	Natoya Goule (JAM)	2:03.62		Q
4	8	Karine Belleau-Beliveau (CAN)	2:03.93		
5	4	Agatha Kimaswai (KEN)	2:04.64		
6	2	Teshon Adderley (BAH)	2:08.24		
7	1	Nimali Liyanarachchi (SRI)	2:08.31		
8	5	Annabelle Lascar (MRI)	2:13.80		

==== Heat 2 ====
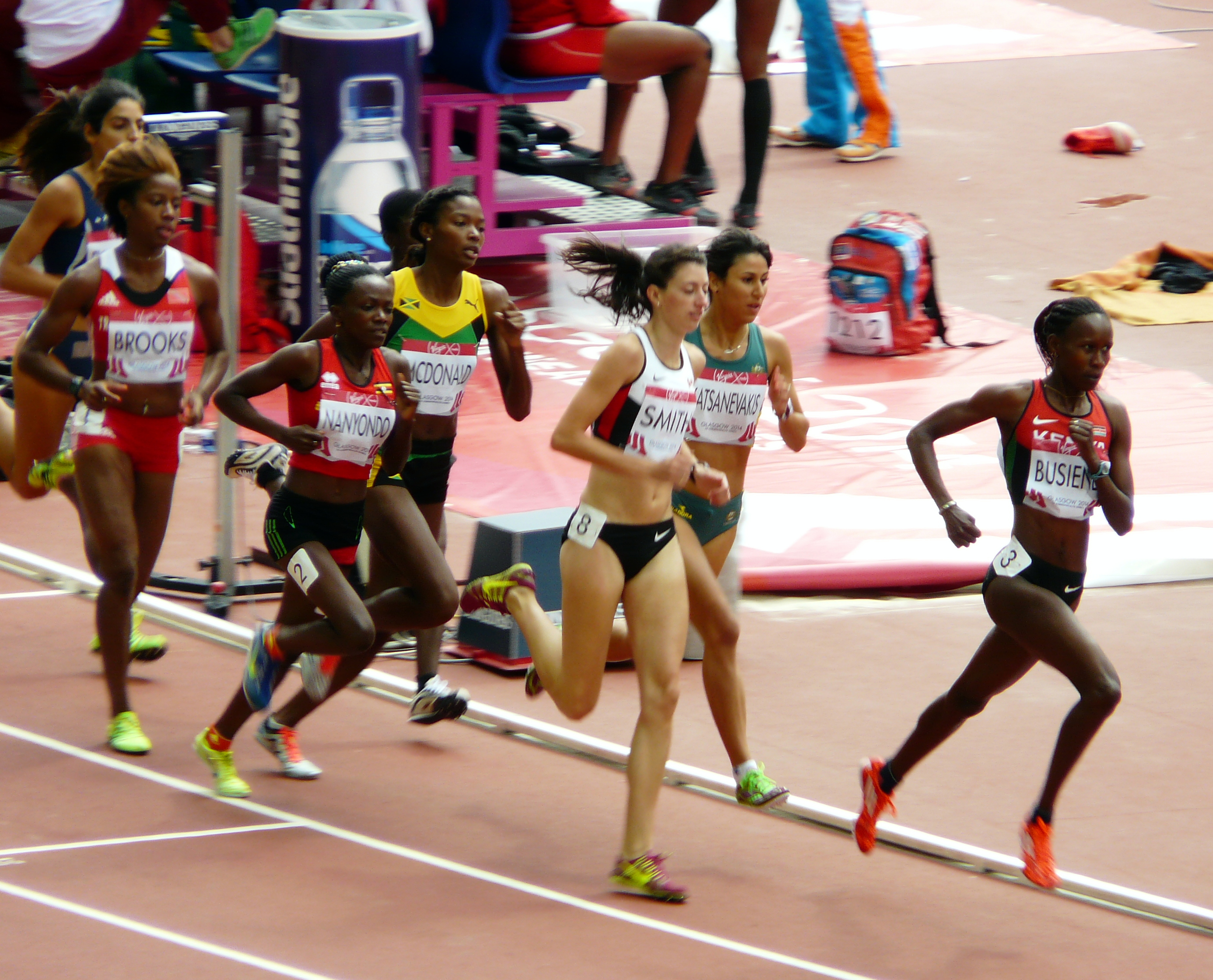
Heat 2

Rank	Order	Name	Result	Notes	Qual.
1	8	Jessica Smith (CAN)	2:05.22		Q
2	2	Winnie Nanyondo (UGA)	2:05.29		Q
3	3	Janeth Jepkosgei Busienei (KEN)	2:05.37		Q
4	5	Katherine Katsanevakis (AUS)	2:05.41		
5	7	Natalia Evangelidou (CYP)	2:05.95		
6	1	Aleena Brooks (TRI)	2:06.33		
7	6	Kimara McDonald (JAM)	2:08.59		
8	4	Martha Bissah (GHA)	2:10.95		

==== Heat 3 ====
Rank	Order	Name	Result	Notes	Qual.
1	2	Melissa Bishop (CAN)	2:01.73		Q
2	7	Jessica Judd (ENG)	2:02.16		Q
3	3	Emily Dudgeon (SCO)	2:02.35		Q
4	1	Tintu Lukka (IND)	2:02.74		q
5	4	Angie Smit (NZL)	2:03.28		q
6	5	Donna Koniel (PNG)	2:14.56		
7	6	Simoya Campbell (JAM)	2:15.00		

==== Heat 4 ====
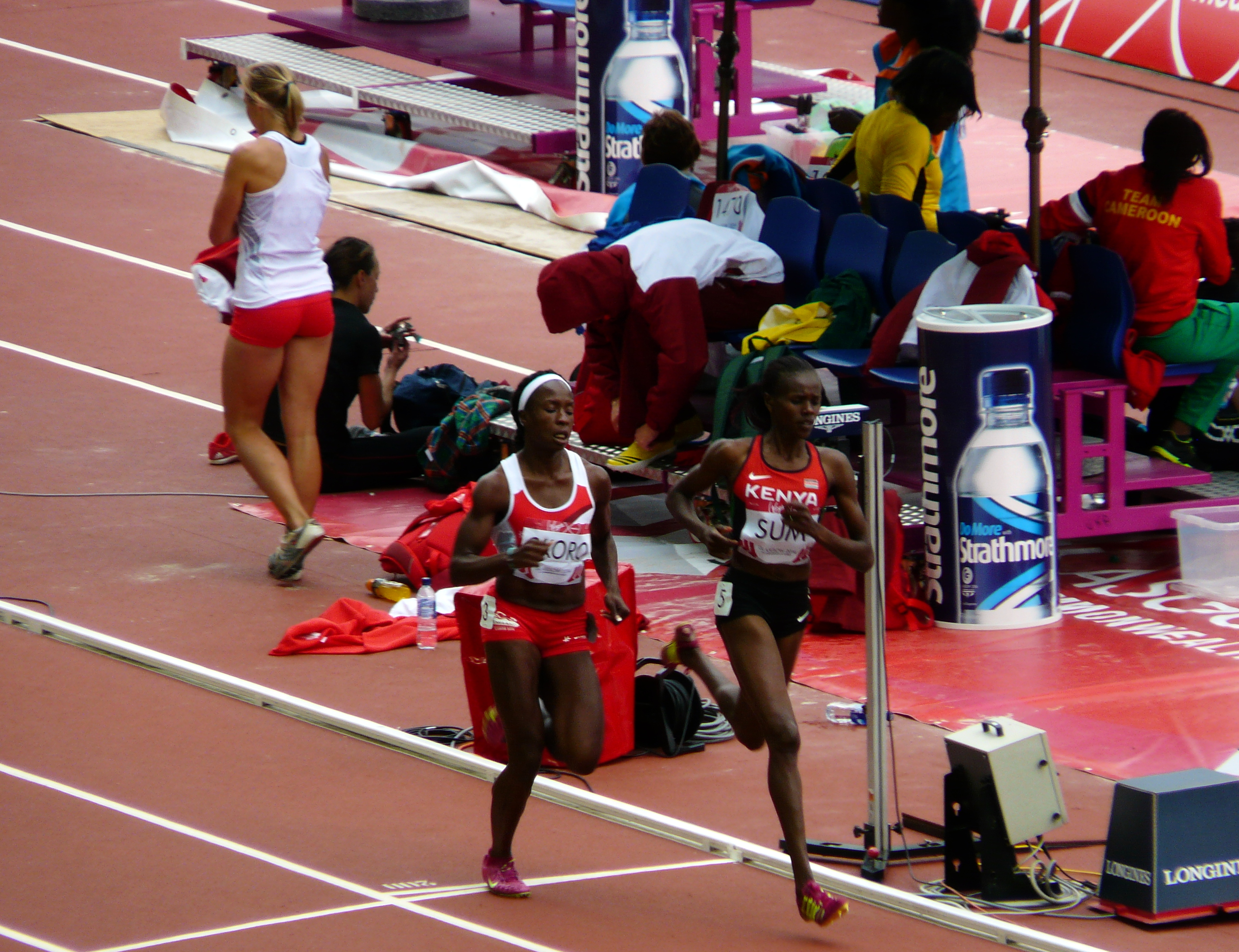
Heat 4

Rank	Order	Name	Result	Notes	Qual.
1	5	Eunice Jepkoech Sum (KEN)	2:02.36		Q
2	6	Katie Kirk (NIR)	2:03.00		Q
3	7	Brittany McGowan (AUS)	2:03.08		Q
4	1	Nikki Hamblin (NZL)	2:03.32		q
5	3	Marilyn Okoro (ENG)	2:03.90		q
6	2	Faith Labana (MAW)	2:27.48		
	4	Laura Muir (SCO)	DNS		

=== Semifinals ===
==== Semifinal 1 ====
Rank	Order	Name	Result	Notes	Qual.
1	4	Eunice Jepkoech Sum (KEN)	2:01.38		Q
2	5	Melissa Bishop (CAN)	2:01.86		Q
3	8	Angie Smit (NZL)	2:01.97		Q
4	6	Lynsey Sharp (SCO)	2:02.28		q
5	3	Jennifer Meadows (ENG)	2:02.29		q
6	2	Katie Kirk (NIR)	2:02.63	PB	
7	7	Tintu Lukka (IND)	2:03.35		
8	1	Marilyn Okoro (ENG)	2:06.75		

==== Semifinal 2 ====
Rank	Order	Name	Result	Notes	Qual.
1	6	Jessica Judd (ENG)	2:02.26		Q
2	4	Winnie Nanyondo (UGA)	2:02.83		Q
3	2	Nikki Hamblin (NZL)	2:02.87		Q
4	1	Emily Dudgeon (SCO)	2:03.00		
5	5	Natoya Goule (JAM)	2:04.23		
6	7	Jessica Smith (CAN)	2:04.42		
7	3	Janeth Jepkosgei Busienei (KEN)	2:04.60		
8	8	Brittany McGowan (AUS)	2:08.79		

=== Final ===
Rank	Order	Name	Result	Notes
1st place, gold medalist(s)	3	Eunice Jepkoech Sum (KEN)	2:00.31	
2nd place, silver medalist(s)	6	Lynsey Sharp (SCO)	2:01.34	
3rd place, bronze medalist(s)	4	Winnie Nanyondo (UGA)	2:01.38	
4	7	Jessica Judd (ENG)	2:01.91	
5	1	Angie Smit (NZL)	2:01.94	
6	8	Jennifer Meadows (ENG)	2:02.19	
7	2	Nikki Hamblin (NZL)	2:02.43	SB
8	5	Melissa Bishop (CAN)	2:02.61	
