= 2014 IAAF World Relays – Women's 4 × 800 metres relay =

2014 athletic competition

Women's 4 × 800 metres relay at the 2014 IAAF World Relays
- Venue: Thomas Robinson Stadium
- Dates: 25 May (final)

The women's 4 × 800 metres relay at the 2014 IAAF World Relays was held at the Thomas Robinson Stadium on 25 May.

== Records ==
Prior to the competition, the records were as follows:

World record	Soviet Union (Nadiya Olizarenko, Lyubov Gurina, Lyudmila Borisova, Irina Podyalovskaya)	7:50.17	Moscow, Soviet Union	5 August 1984
Championship record	New event			
World Leading	No record			
African Record	Kenya (Winny Chebet, Eunice Jepkoech Sum, Hellen Onsando Obiri, Janeth Jepkosgei)	8:07.58	Philadelphia, United States	27 April 2013
Asian Record	China (Liaoning Team); Liu Dong, Chen Yumei, Qu Yunxia, Liu Li	8:16.2	Shanghai, China	3 October 1991
North, Central American and Caribbean record	United States Red (Lea Wallace, Brenda Martinez, Ajee' Wilson, Alysia Johnson Montano)	8:04.31	Philadelphia, United States	27 April 2013
South American Record	Brazil (C.R. Flamengo) (Cristiane Barbosa, Cintia Fragoso, Lorena de Oliveira, Ana Paula Pereira)	9:29.10	Rio de Janeiro, Brazil	21 December 2000
European Record	Soviet Union (Nadiya Olizarenko, Lyubov Gurina, Lyudmila Borisova, Irina Podyalovskaya)	7:50.17	Moscow, Soviet Union	5 August 1984
Oceanian record	Australia (Zoe Buckman, Anna Laman, Heidi Gregson, Selma Kajan)	8:18.96	(Australia) Philadelphia, United States	27 April 2013

== Schedule ==
Date	Time	Round
25 May 2014	19:00	Final

All times are local times (UTC−4)

== Results ==
The Russian team, originally 3rd, was later disqualified due to doping by Irina Maracheva.

KEY:	q	Fastest non-qualifiers	Q	Qualified	NR	National record	PB	Personal best	SB	Seasonal best

Rank	Lane	Nation	Athletes	Time	Notes	Points
1st place, gold medalist(s)	6	United States	Chanelle Price, Geena Lara, Ajee' Wilson, Brenda Martinez	8:01.58	CR "AR"	8
2nd place, silver medalist(s)	4	Kenya	Janeth Jepkosgei, Agatha Jeruto Kimaswai, Sylvia Chematui Chesebe, Eunice Jepkoech Sum	8:04.28	AR	7
3rd place, bronze medalist(s)	1	Australia	Brittany McGowan, Zoe Buckman, Selma Kajan, Melissa Duncan	8:13.26	AR	~~5~~ 6
4	3	Jamaica	Yanique Malcolm, Simoya Campbell, Chrisann Gordon, Natoya Goule	8:17.22	NR	~~4~~ 5
5	8	France	Justine Fedronic, Clarisse Moh, Lisa Blameble, Rénelle Lamote	8:17.54	NR	~~3~~ 4
6	5	Romania	Adelina Elena Tanasie, Claudia Bobocea, Florina Pierdevara, Mihaela Nunu	8:23.12	SB	~~2~~ 3
7	7	Mexico	Gabriela Medina, Cristina Guevara, Mariel Espinosa, Arantza Hernández	8:24.45	NR	~~1~~ 2
	2	Trinidad and Tobago	Jessica James, Shawna Fermin, Alena Brooks, Romona Modeste	DNF		
	8	Russia	Irina Maracheva, Elena Kobeleva, Tatyana Myazina, Svetlana Rogozina	~~8:08.19~~ DQ	~~SB~~	~~6~~
