= 2010 African Championships in Athletics – Women's 800 metres =

The women's 800 metres at the 2010 African Championships in Athletics were held on July 31–August 1.

== Medalists ==
Gold	Silver	Bronze
Zahra Bouras; Algeria	Janeth Jepkosgei; Kenya	Malika Akkaoui; Morocco

== Results ==
=== Heats ===
Qualification: First 3 of each heat (Q) and the next 2 fastest (q) qualified for the final.

Rank	Heat	Name	Nationality	Time	Notes
1	1	Janeth Jepkosgei	Kenya	2:01.50	Q
2	1	Malika Akkaoui	Morocco	2:02.24	Q
3	1	Zahra Bouras	Algeria	2:02.88	Q
4	1	Mapaseka Makhanya	South Africa	2:05.39	q
5	1	Leonor Piuza	Mozambique	2:07.35	q
6	2	Halima Hachlaf	Morocco	2:08.04	Q
7	2	Btissam Lakhouad	Morocco	2:08.42	Q
8	2	Winny Chebet	Kenya	2:08.50	Q
9	2	Eunice Sum	Kenya	2:08.71	
10	2	Nazret Weldu	Eritrea	2:09.24	
11	2	Annabelle Lascar	Mauritius	2:11.82	
12	2	Mulu Diriba	Ethiopia	2:14.56	
13	1	Zenebech Olamo	Ethiopia	2:14.67	
14	1	Goitseone Seleka	Botswana	2:31.74	
	2	Ngambo Mujinga	Democratic Republic of the Congo	DNF	
	1	Alwaia Andal	Sudan	DNS	

=== Final ===
Rank	Name	Nationality	Time	Notes
1st place, gold medalist(s)	Zahra Bouras	Algeria	2:00.22	
2nd place, silver medalist(s)	Janeth Jepkosgei	Kenya	2:00.50	
3rd place, bronze medalist(s)	Malika Akkaoui	Morocco	2:01.01	PB
4	Btissam Lakhouad	Morocco	2:01.75	
5	Winny Chebet	Kenya	2:03.02	
6	Mapaseka Makhanya	South Africa	2:04.91	
7	Leonor Piuza	Mozambique	2:08.45	
	Halima Hachlaf	Morocco	DNF	
