= Alena Brooks =

Trinidad and Tobago middle-distance runner

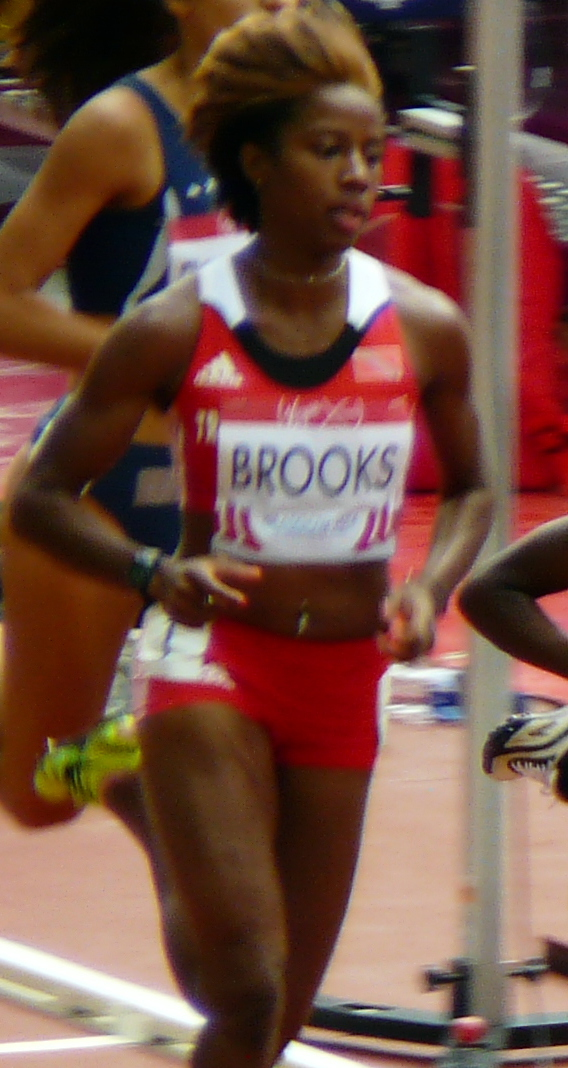
- Alena Brooks in 2014

Personal information
- Born: November 14, 1991 (age 34) Diego Martin, Trinidad
- Education: University of Minnesota
- Height: 1.65 m (5 ft 5 in)
- Weight: 54 kg (119 lb)

Sport
- Sport: Athletics
- Event: 800 metres
- College team: Minnesota Golden Gophers

Alena Candice Harriman-Brooks (born 14 November 1991) is a middle-distance runner from Trinidad and Tobago specialising in the 800 metres. She represented her country at two editions of Commonwealth Games and two editions of Pan American Games. In addition, she won a silver medal at the 2018 Central American and Caribbean Games.

== International competitions ==
Year	Competition	Venue	Position	Event	Notes
Representing Trinidad and Tobago
2009	CARIFTA Games (U20)	Vieux Fort, Saint Lucia	3rd	400 m	54.38
2009	CARIFTA Games (U20)	Vieux Fort, Saint Lucia	3rd	800 m	2:10.23
2010	CARIFTA Games (U20)	George Town, Cayman Islands	5th	400 m	54.83
2010	CARIFTA Games (U20)	George Town, Cayman Islands	2nd	800 m	2:08.97
2010	CARIFTA Games (U20)	George Town, Cayman Islands	2nd	4 × 400 m relay	3:37.32
2010	Central American and Caribbean; Junior Championships (U20)	Santo Domingo, Dominican Republic	7th	400 m	56.40
2010	Central American and Caribbean; Junior Championships (U20)	Santo Domingo, Dominican Republic	2nd	800 m	2:09.29
2010	Central American and Caribbean; Junior Championships (U20)	Santo Domingo, Dominican Republic	2nd	4 × 400 m relay	3:38.49
2010	World Junior Championships	Moncton, Canada	22nd (sf)	800 m	2:10.10
2010	World Junior Championships	Moncton, Canada	10th (h)	4 × 400 m relay	3:40.15
2012	NACAC U23 Championships	Irapuato, Mexico	2nd	4 × 400 m relay	3:33.03
2013	Central American and Caribbean Championships	Morelia, Mexico	1st	4 × 400 m relay	3:30.64
2014	World Relays	Nassau, Bahamas	4th (B)	4 × 400 m relay	3:33.21
2014	World Relays	Nassau, Bahamas	–	4 × 800 m relay	DNF
2014	Commonwealth Games	Glasgow, United Kingdom	21st (h)	800 m	2:06.33
2015	World Relays	Nassau, Bahamas	13th (h)	4 × 400 m relay	3:36.69
2015	Pan American Games	Toronto, Canada	10th (h)	800 m	2:07.82
2015	Pan American Games	Toronto, Canada	7th	4 × 400 m relay	2:01.81
2015	NACAC Championships	San José, Costa Rica	7th	800 m	2:09.66
2015	NACAC Championships	San José, Costa Rica	5th	4 × 400 m relay	3:33.85
2018	Commonwealth Games	Gold Coast, Australia	17th (h)	800 m	2:01.81
2018	Central American and Caribbean Games	Barranquilla, Colombia	2nd	800 m	2:02.26
2018	NACAC Championships	Toronto, Canada	7th	800 m	2:03.77
2019	Pan American Games	Lima, Peru	6th	800 m	2:02.75

== Personal bests ==
Outdoor

- 400 metres – 53.55 (Tucson 2011)
- 800 metres – 2:01.81 (Gold Coast 2018) NR
- 1500 metres – 4:33.82 (Fayetteville 2018)

Indoor

- 400 metres – 54.08 (Fayetteville 2019)
- 800 metres – 2:04.09 (Fayetteville 2018) NR
- 1500 metres – 4:33.82 (Fayetteville 2018)
- One mile – 5:21.29 (Fayetteville 2017)
