= Annabelle Lascar =

Mauritian middle-distance runner

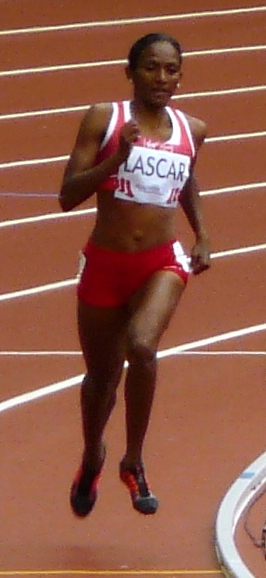
- Lascar competing at the 2014 Commonwealth Games

Personal information
- Born: 25 April 1985 (age 41) Quatre Bornes, Mauritius
- Height: 1.60 m (5 ft 3 in)
- Weight: 54 kg (119 lb) (2014)

Sport
- Country: Mauritius
- Sport: Athletics
- Event: 800 metres

Marie Annabelle Jennifer Lascar (born 25 April 1985) is a Mauritian middle-distance runner. She represented her country at the 2008 and 2012 Summer Olympics failing to reach the semifinals.

Her personal best in the event is 2:05.45, set during her second Olympic start.

== Competition record ==
Year	Competition	Venue	Position	Event	Notes
Representing Mauritius
2006	African Championships	Bambous, Mauritius	18th (h)	400 m	57.20
2006	African Championships	Bambous, Mauritius	17th (h)	800 m	2:13.45
2008	Olympic Games	Beijing, China	34th (h)	800 m	2:06.11
2009	Jeux de la Francophonie	Beirut, Lebanon	9th (h)	800 m	2:08.51
2010	African Championships	Nairobi, Kenya	21st (h)	400 m	56.88
2010	African Championships	Nairobi, Kenya	11th (h)	800 m	2:11.82
2011	All-Africa Games	Maputo, Mozambique	8th	800 m	2:10.70
2011	All-Africa Games	Maputo, Mozambique	10th	1500 m	4:35.76
2012	African Championships	Porto-Novo, Benin	12th (h)	800 m	2:07.70
2012	Olympic Games	London, United Kingdom	19th (h)	800 m	2:05.45
2013	Jeux de la Francophonie	Nice, France	12th (h)	800 m	2:10.88
2014	Commonwealth Games	Glasgow, United Kingdom	26th (h)	800 m	2:13.80
2014	African Championships	Marrakesh, Morocco	12th (h)	800 m	2:11.56
