= Nanjing World Challenge =

Track and field competition in Nanjing, China

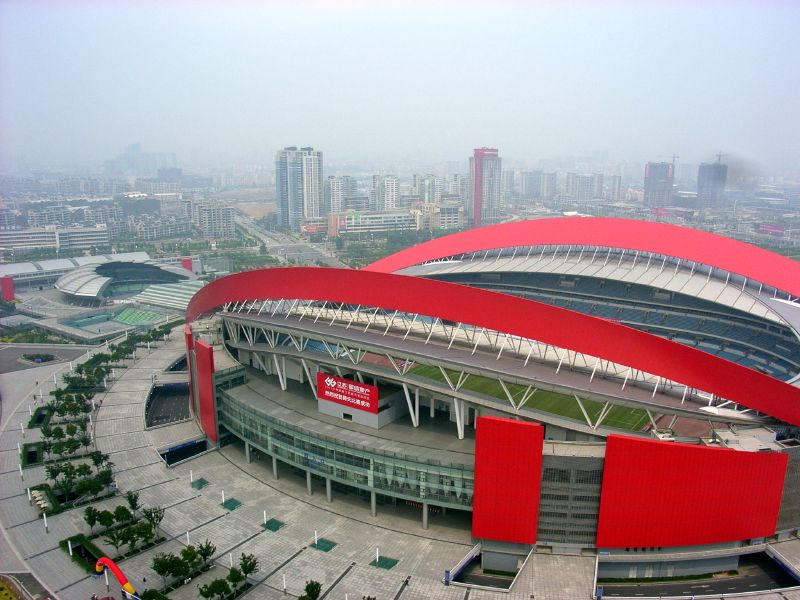
- Date: May
- Location: Nanjing Olympic Sports Centre, Nanjing, China
- Event type: Track and field
- Established: 2019

The Nanjing World Challenge is a track and field meet at Nanjing Olympic Sports Centre in Nanjing, China. The inaugural edition was held in 2019 as part of the IAAF World Challenge.

== Meeting records ==
=== Men ===
Men's meeting records of the Nanjing World Challenge
Event	Record	Athlete	Nationality	Date	Ref.
100 m	10.09 (+0.2 m/s)	Mike Rodgers	United States	21 May 2019	
800 m	1:44.38	Nijel Amos	Botswana	21 May 2019	
110 m hurdles	13.27 (+0.1 m/s)	Orlando Ortega	Spain	21 May 2019	
400 m hurdles	49.16	Takatoshi Abe	Japan	21 May 2019	
3000 m steeplechase	8:08.94	Benjamin Kigen	Kenya	21 May 2019	
High jump	2.31 m	Wang Yu	Japan	21 May 2019	
Long jump	8.21 m (+0.2 m/s)	Tajay Gayle	Jamaica	20 May 2019	
Triple jump	17.47 m (+0.4 m/s)	Christian Taylor	United States	21 May 2019	
Javelin throw	86.39 m	Thomas Röhler	Germany	21 May 2019	

=== Women ===
Women's meeting records of the Nanjing World Challenge
Event	Record	Athlete	Nationality	Date	Ref.
200 m	22.40 (−0.2 m/s)	Elaine Thompson	Jamaica	21 May 2019	
800 m	1:59.98	Nelly Jepkosgei	Kenya	21 May 2019	
1500 m	3:59.57	Gudaf Tsegay	Ethiopia	21 May 2019	
100 m hurdles	12.78 (−1.0 m/s)	Brianna McNeal	United States	21 May 2019	
Long jump	6.56 m (−0.6 m/s)	Jazmin Sawyers	Great Britain	21 May 2019	
Shot put	19.84 m	Gong Lijiao	China	21 May 2019	
Hammer throw	75.27 m	Wang Zheng	China	21 May 2019	
