= Athletics at the 2011 All-Africa Games – Women's 800 metres =

The women's 800 metres event at the 2011 All-Africa Games was held on 11–12 September.

== Medalists ==
Gold	Silver	Bronze
Annet Negesa; Uganda	Fantu Magiso; Ethiopia	Sylvia Chesebe; Kenya

== Results ==
=== Heats ===
Qualification: First 3 of each heat (Q) and the next 2 fastest (q) qualified for the final.

Rank	Heat	Name	Nationality	Time	Notes
1	1	Annet Negesa	Uganda	2:05.68	Q
2	1	Fantu Magiso	Ethiopia	2:06.50	Q
3	1	Nelly Jepkosgei	Kenya	2:06.54	Q
4	2	Alem Gereziher	Ethiopia	2:07.48	Q
5	2	Sylvia Chesebe	Kenya	2:07.66	Q
6	2	Jane Jelagat	Kenya	2:08.01	Q
7	1	Ehsan Gibril	Sudan	2:08.97	q
8	1	Annabelle Lascar	Mauritius	2:09.86	q
9	2	Alwia Maki	Sudan	2:10.24	
10	2	Elisa Cossa	Mozambique	2:11.87	
11	1	Faithful Goremusandu	Zimbabwe	2:14.88	
12	2	Leonor Piuza	Mozambique	2:18.44	
13	2	Liteboho Makhatseane	Lesotho	2:24.19	
14	1	Zourah Ali	Djibouti	2:36.61	

=== Final ===
Rank	Name	Nationality	Time	Notes
1st place, gold medalist(s)	Annet Negesa	Uganda	2:01.81	
2nd place, silver medalist(s)	Fantu Magiso	Ethiopia	2:03.22	
3rd place, bronze medalist(s)	Sylvia Chesebe	Kenya	2:04.16	
4	Nelly Jepkosgei	Kenya	2:05.35	
5	Jane Jelagat	Kenya	2:06.52	
6	Alem Gereziher	Ethiopia	2:07.53	
7	Ehsan Gibril	Sudan	2:09.10	
8	Annabelle Lascar	Mauritius	2:10.70	
