= Athletics at the 2023 African Games – Women's 800 metres =

The women's 800 metres event at the 2023 African Games was held on 18 and 19 March 2024 in Accra, Ghana.

== Medalists ==
Gold	Silver	Bronze
Tsige Duguma; Ethiopia	Halimah Nakaayi; Uganda	Vivian Chebet; Kenya

== Results ==
=== Heats ===
Qualification: First 2 in each heat (Q) and the next 2 fastest (q) advanced to the final.

Rank	Heat	Name	Nationality	Time	Notes
1	3	Tsige Duguma	Ethiopia	2:02.08	Q
2	3	Vivian Chebet	Kenya	2:02.36	Q
3	1	Halimah Nakaayi	Uganda	2:03.59	Q
4	1	Oratile Nowe	Botswana	2:04.35	Q
5	3	Susan Aneno	Uganda	2:04.73	q
6	2	Lilian Odira	Kenya	2:04.86	Q
7	2	Areri Genale	Ethiopia	2:05.05	Q
8	3	Comfort James	Nigeria	2:05.11	q
9	3	Christabel Kunda	Zambia	2:08.68	
10	2	Assia Raziki	Morocco	2:09.33	
11	1	Adanu Nenko	Ethiopia	2:10.45	qR
12	2	Tuuliki Angala	Namibia	2:10.66	
13	2	Almaz Kiflom	Eritrea	2:10.90	
14	1	Ahare Abusuare	Ghana	2:11.11	
15	3	Odette Sawekoua	Benin	2:11.75	
16	1	Belvia Boy-Fini	Central African Republic	2:15.31	
17	1	Leonce Missamou-Bafoundissa	Republic of the Congo	2:16.40	
18	3	Ariella Harerimana	Burundi	2:17.00	
19	2	Haleca Joana	Angola	2:17.24	
20	2	Jane Sento Kargbo	Sierra Leone	2:20.29	
21	1	Tislem Abderrahmane	Mauritania	2:58.17	

=== Final ===
Rank	Name	Nationality	Time	Notes
1st place, gold medalist(s)	Tsige Duguma	Ethiopia	1:57.73	WL
2nd place, silver medalist(s)	Halimah Nakaayi	Uganda	1:58.59	
3rd place, bronze medalist(s)	Vivian Chebet	Kenya	2:00.27	
4	Lilian Odira	Kenya	2:00.81	
5	Oratile Nowe	Botswana	2:01.62	=NR
6	Susan Aneno	Uganda	2:04.79	
7	Comfort James	Nigeria	2:04.87	
8	Adanu Nenko	Ethiopia	2:06.64	
9	Areri Genale	Ethiopia	2:06.71	
