= Tsige Duguma =

Ethiopian athlete (born 2001)

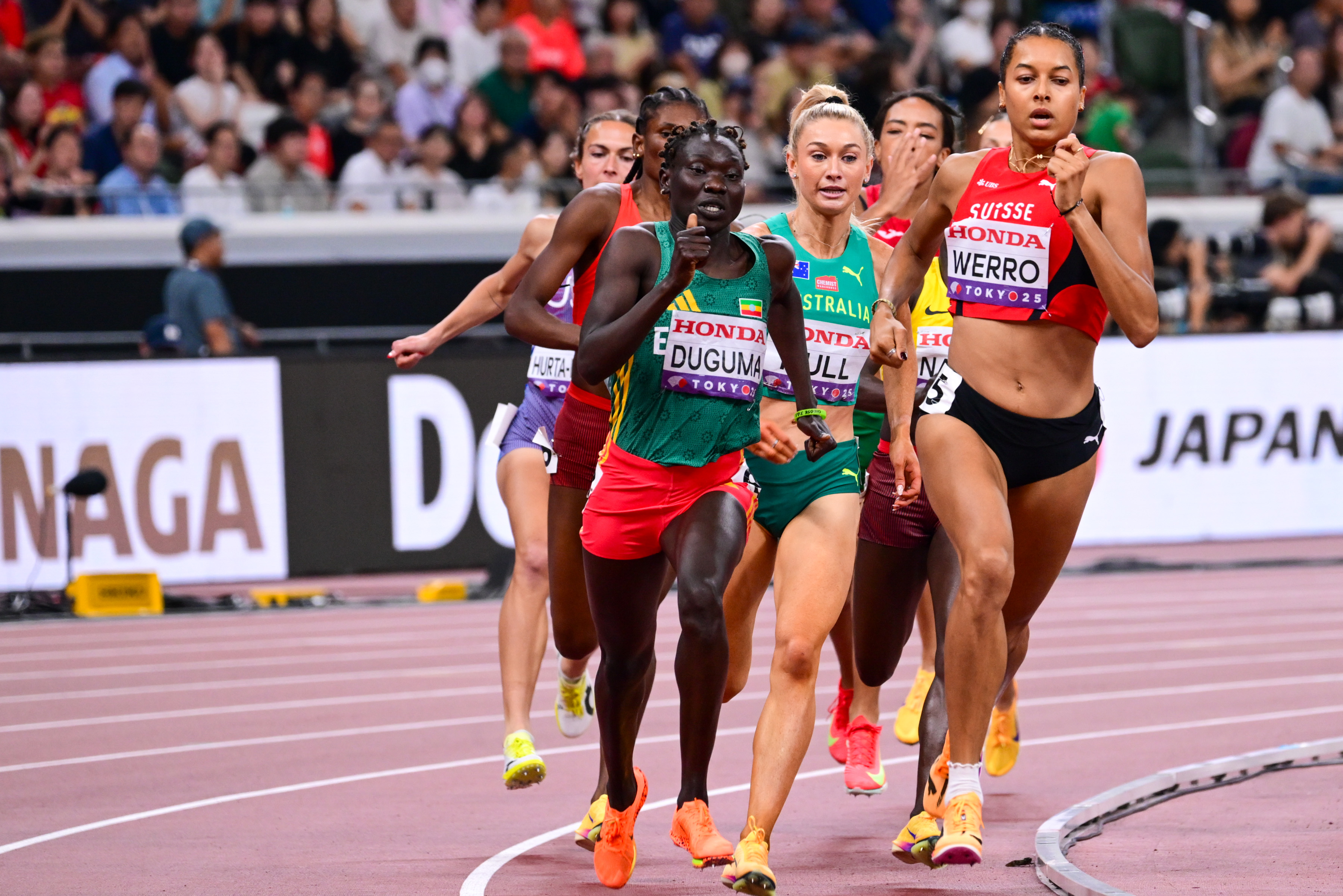
- Duguma at the 2025 World Championships

Personal information
- Full name: Tsige Duguma
- Nationality: Ethiopian
- Born: 23 February 2001 (age 25) Kamashi, Benishangul-Gumuz Region, Ethiopia

Sport
- Sport: Athletics
- Events: 400 metres, 800 metres

Achievements and titles
- Personal bests: 400 m: 54.43 (2022); 800 m: 1:56.64 (2025, NR); 1500 m: 3:55.06 (2026)
Medal record
Women's athletics
Representing Ethiopia
Olympic Games
Silver medal – second place	2024 Paris	800 m
World Athletics Indoor Championships
Gold medal – first place	2024 Glasgow	800 m
African Games
Gold medal – first place	2023 Accra	800 m

Tsige Duguma (Amharic: ጽጌ ዱጉማ; born 23 February 2001) is an Ethiopian track and field athlete who won gold at the 2024 World Athletics Indoor Championships over 800 metres. She is also an Ethiopian national champion over 400 metres.

== Biography ==
Duguma was a silver medalist over 200 metres at the 2017 African U20 Championships in Athletics in Algeria.

In March 2022, she won the Ethiopian national indoor championships over 400 metres in Hawassa. In July 2023, she set a new personal best over 800 metres, breaking the 2-minute barrier for the first time as she record 1:59.40 in Belgium.

In February 2024, she completed a front-running victory over 800 metres in Belgrade in a time of 1:59.66. She won gold at the 2024 World Athletics Indoor Championships in Glasgow in the women's 800 metres. She had previously won her qualifying heat in a time of 2:00.50, and won her semi-final in a personal best time 1:58.35. She became Ethiopia's first women's world indoor champion in the discipline.

In March 2024, she won gold in the 800 metres at the African Games. Tsige ran a personal best of 1:57.15 in the final of the 800 m at the Paris Olympics to place second and earn a silver medal behind winner Keely Hodgkinson.

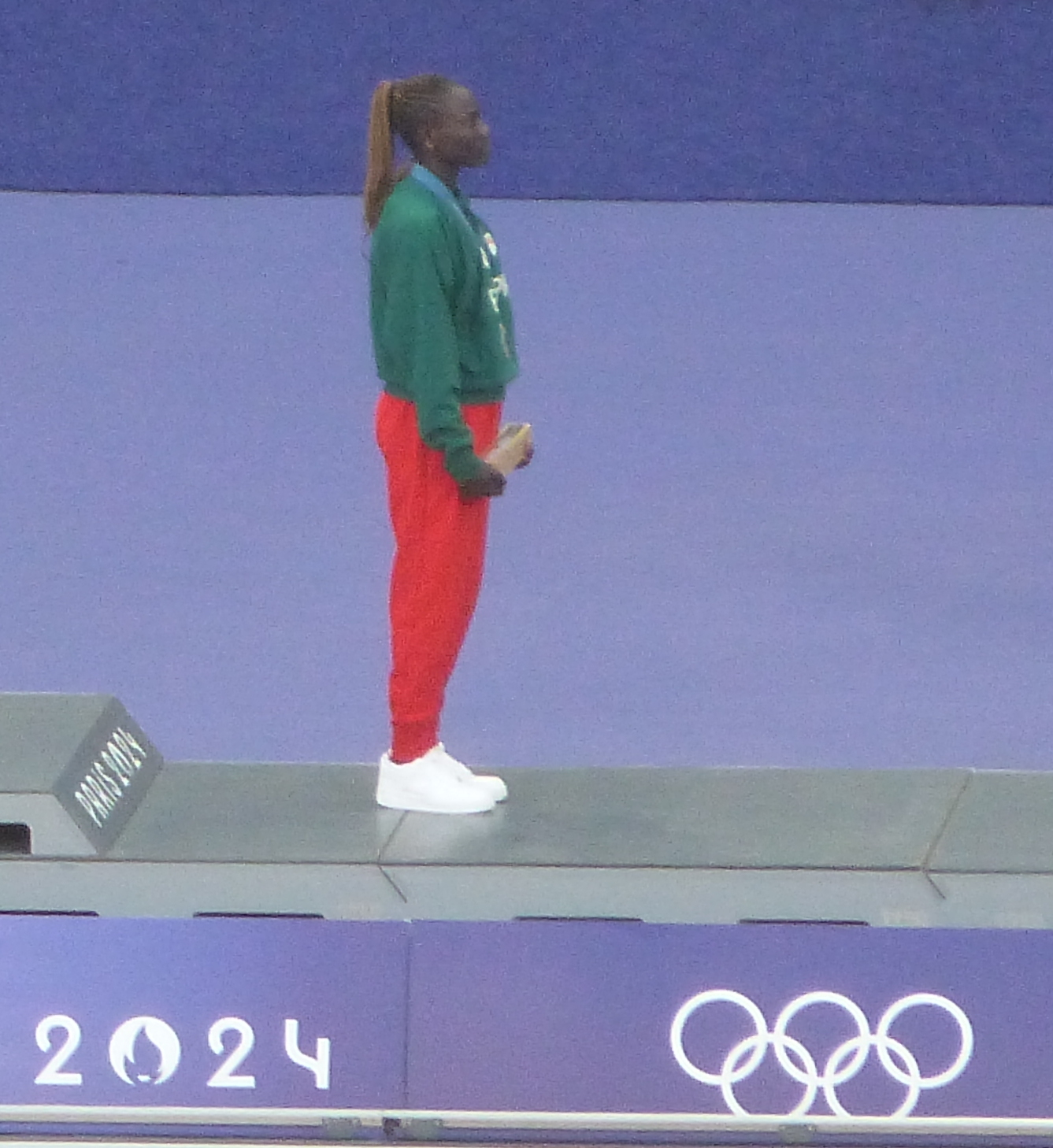
On the podium at the 2024 Olympic Games

She won the 800 metres indoors at the Copernicus Cup in Poland, on 16 February 2025. She was awarded a wild card place for the 2025 World Athletics Indoor Championships in Nanjing, China, for her performances on the 2025 World Athletics Indoor Tour. At the championships, she reached the final of the 800 metres.

Competing at the 2025 Shanghai Diamond League, she ran a national and meet record 1:56.64 to win the women's 800 m. In May 2025, she also won the 800 metres at the 2025 Meeting International Mohammed VI d'Athlétisme de Rabat, part of the 2025 Diamond League. She ran 1:57.10 to win the 800 metres at the 2025 Prefontaine Classic on 5 July.

In September 2025, she was a semi-finalist in the women's 800 metres at the 2025 World Athletics Championships in Tokyo, Japan.

On 1 February 2026, she on ahead of Addy Wiley and Maggi Congdon over 1000 metres at the Millrose Games in 2:35.50. Duguma was selected for the Ethiopian team to compete in the 1500 m at the 2026 World Athletics Indoor Championships in Kuyavian–Pomeranian, Poland. However, on the eve of the championships it was reported that she was one of a number of Ethiopian athletes, including Saron Berhe and Haregeweyni Kalayu, who were unable to compete due to issues obtaining the requisite VISA.

In May, she placed second in 3:55.71 in just her second ever 1500m race – and her first outdoors - at the 2026 Shanghai Diamond League. On 31 May, she also finished in second place in 1:57.24 for the 800 metres at the 2026 Diamond League in Rabat. On 19 June, she placed second in the 800 metres with 1:58.08 at the 2026 Doha Diamond League. Competing at the 2026 London Athletics Meet on 18 July, Duguma ran a season's best of 1:56.92 for third in the 800 metres. On 23 August, Duguma won in only the fourth 1500 metres race of her career, setting a new world-lead and personal best time of 3:55.06 in the Diamond League at the 2026 Kamila Skolimowska Memorial in Silesia, Poland.

== Personal bests ==
Personal bests in individual events
Event	Time	Location	Date	Record
400 metres	54.43	Saint Pierre, Mauritius	8 June 2022	
800 metres	1:56.64	Shaoxing, China	3 May 2025	NR
800 metres short track	1:58.35 i	Glasgow, United Kingdom	2 March 2024	
1000 metres short track	2:35.50 i	New York City, United States	1 February 2026	
1500 metres	3:55.71	Shaoxing, China	16 May 2026	
1500 metres short track	4:03.96 i	Toruń, Poland	22 February 2026	
