= Malika Akkaoui =

Moroccan middle-distance runner

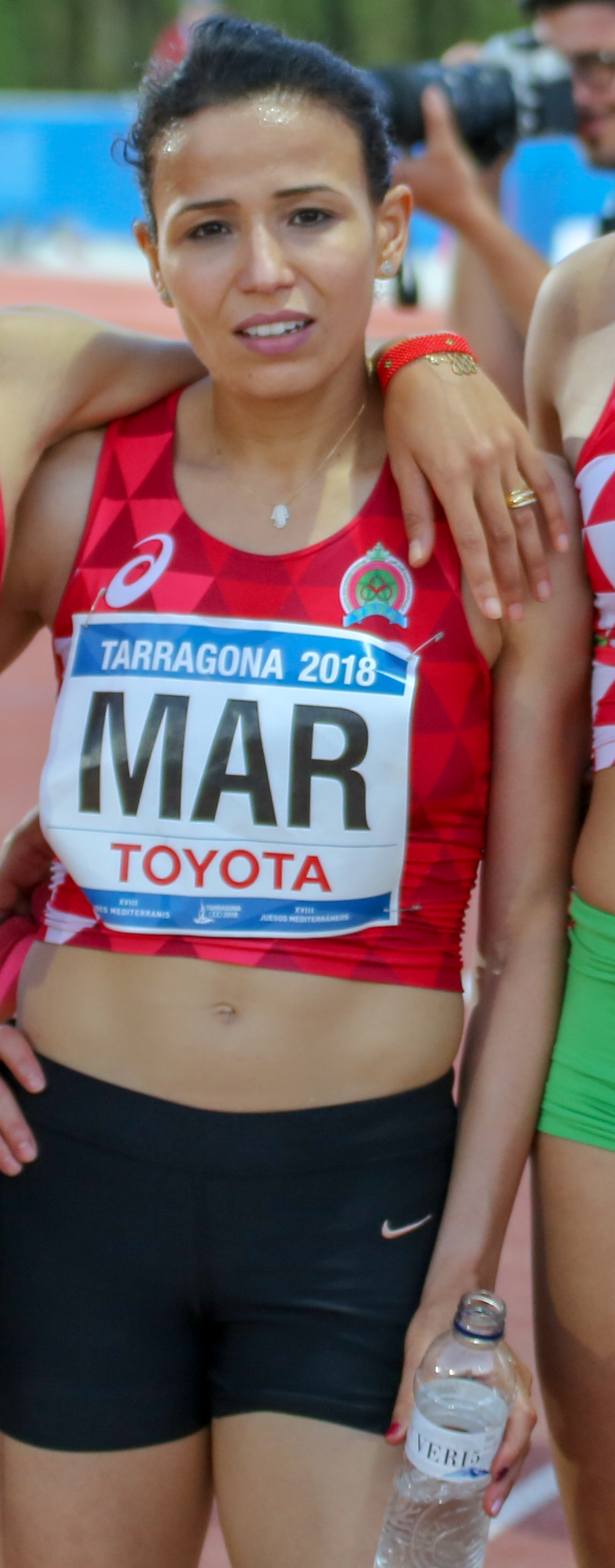
- Akkaoui in 2018

Medal record

Women's athletics

Representing Morocco

African Championships
Silver medal – second place	2016 Durban	800 m
Bronze medal – third place	2010 Nairobi	800 m
Bronze medal – third place	2012 Porto-Novo	800 m
Bronze medal – third place	2018 Asaba	1500 m

Mediterranean Games
Gold medal – first place	2013 Mersin	800 m

Pan Arab Games
Gold medal – first place	2011 Doha	400 m
Gold medal – first place	2011 Doha	800 m

Malika Al-Akkaoui (born 25 December 1987 in Zaida) is a Moroccan middle-distance runner. At the 2012 Summer Olympics, she competed in the Women's 800 metres. At the 2016 Olympics, she competed in the 800 and 1500 m.

She finished 10th in the 1500m at the 2017 World Athletics Championships. Al-Akkaoui bagged a gold each in the 400 m and the 800 m at the 2011 Pan Arab Games as well as in the 800 m at the 2013 Mediterranean Games.

== International competitions ==
Year	Competition	Venue	Position	Event	Notes
Representing Morocco
2004	Arab Youth Championships	Rabat, Morocco	2nd	800 m	2:10.31
2006	World Junior Championships	Beijing, China	31st (h)	800 m	2:10.20
2010	African Championships	Nairobi, Kenya	3rd	800 m	2:01.01
2011	World Championships	Daegu, South Korea	30th (h)	1500 m	4:14.79
2011	Arab Championships	Al Ain, United Arab Emirates	2nd	800 m	2:05.15
2011	Arab Championships	Al Ain, United Arab Emirates	1st	4 × 400 m relay	3:40.58
2011	Pan Arab Games	Doha, Qatar	1st	400 m	53.94
2011	Pan Arab Games	Doha, Qatar	1st	800 m	2:02.42
2011	Pan Arab Games	Doha, Qatar	1st	4 × 400 m relay	3:38.64
2012	World Indoor Championships	Istanbul, Turkey	14th (h)	1500 m	2:04.20
2012	African Championships	Porto-Novo, Benin	3rd	800 m	1:59.90
2012	Olympic Games	London, United Kingdom	12th (sf)	800 m	2:00.32
2013	Mediterranean Games	Mersin, Turkey	1st	800 m	2:00.72
2013	Mediterranean Games	Mersin, Turkey	–	4 × 400 m	DQ
2013	World Championships	Moscow, Russia	16th (sf)	800 m	2:02.29
2013	Jeux de la Francophonie	Nice, France	2nd	800 m	2:02.61
2013	Jeux de la Francophonie	Nice, France	4th	4 × 400 m relay	3:37.48
2013	Islamic Solidarity Games	Palembang, Indonesia	1st	400 m	53.19
2013	Islamic Solidarity Games	Palembang, Indonesia	1st	800 m	2:06.97
2013	Islamic Solidarity Games	Palembang, Indonesia	1st	4 × 400 m relay	3:38.56
2014	World Indoor Championships	Sopot, Poland	16th (h)	1500 m	2:06.04
2014	African Championships	Marrakesh, Morocco	6th	800 m	2:02.63
2015	Arab Championships	Isa Town, Bahrain	1st	800 m	2:05:77
2015	World Championships	Beijing, China	12th (sf)	800 m	1:59.03
2015	World Championships	Beijing, China	12th	1500 m	4:16.98
2016	World Indoor Championships	Portland, United States	10th (h)	800 m	2:04.00
2016	African Championships	Durban, South Africa	2nd	800 m	2:00.24
2016	Olympic Games	Rio de Janeiro, Brazil	27th (h)	800 m	2:00.52
2016	Olympic Games	Rio de Janeiro, Brazil	19th (sf)	1500 m	4:08.55
2017	Islamic Solidarity Games	Baku, Azerbaijan	1st	800 m	2:01.04
2017	Islamic Solidarity Games	Baku, Azerbaijan	–	4 × 100 m relay	DQ
2017	Jeux de la Francophonie	Abidjan, Ivory Coast	1st	800 m	2:00.71
2017	Jeux de la Francophonie	Abidjan, Ivory Coast	2nd	1500 m	4:17.36
2017	World Championships	London, United Kingdom	10th	1500 m	4:05.87
2018	World Indoor Championship	Birmingham, United Kingdom	22nd (h)	1500 m	4:15.09
2018	Mediterranean Games	Tarragona, Spain	2nd	800 m	2:01.50
2018	Mediterranean Games	Tarragona, Spain	2nd	1500 m	4:13.31
2018	Mediterranean Games	Tarragona, Spain	4th	4 × 400 m relay	3:33.91
2018	African Championships	Asaba, Nigeria	6th	800 m	2:00.01
2018	African Championships	Asaba, Nigeria	3rd	1500 m	4:14.17
2019	Arab Championships	Cairo, Egypt	1st	1500 m	4:29.10
2019	Arab Championships	Cairo, Egypt	2nd	4 × 400 m relay	3:49.85
2019	African Games	Rabat, Morocco	4th	800 m	2:03.78
2019	African Games	Rabat, Morocco	4th	1500 m	4:20.64
2019	World Championships	Doha, Qatar	27th (h)	800 m	2:03.40
2019	World Championships	Doha, Qatar	20th (sf)	1500 m	4:16.83
