= Noélie Yarigo =

Beninese middle-distance runner

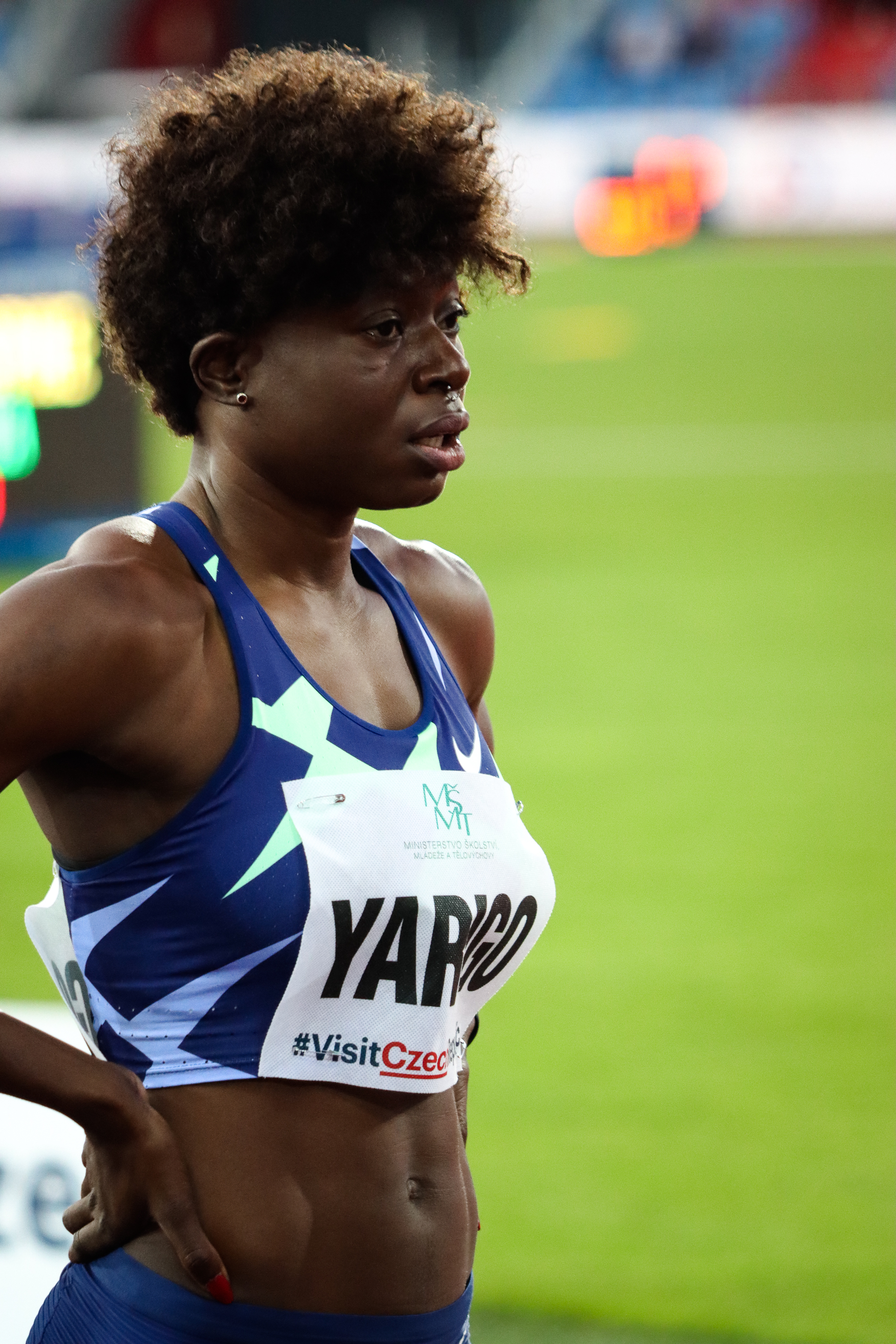
- Yarigo at the 2020 Golden Spike in Ostrava

Personal information
- Full name: Noélie Ditchakou Yarigo
- Born: 26 December 1985 (age 40) Natitingou, Benin
- Education: Parakou University, Benin
- Height: 168 cm (5 ft 6 in)
- Weight: 56 kg (123 lb)

Sport
- Sport: Track and field
- Event: 800 metres
- Club: ECCAS
- Coached by: Claude Guillaume

Noélie Ditchakou Yarigo (born 26 December 1985) is a Beninese middle-distance runner who competes primarily in the 800 metres. She represented her country at the 2016 Rio, 2020 Tokyo Olympics and 2024 Paris Olympics.

Yarigo holds five Beninese national records including at 800 m indoors and out.

== Career ==
Noélie Yarigo set her first Beninese 800 metres record in 2003 at the age of 17, reducing it to 2:11.61 while still a teenager two years later. But she then took a long break from the sport and only returned in 2012 at the age of 26.

She serves with the Benin Air Force. She was given leave to prepare for the 2016 Rio de Janeiro Olympics and used it to train in France at the club run by the wife of her coach. At the Games, Yarigo broke for the first time the two-minute barrier in the heats with a time of 1:59.12.

At the postponed 2020 Tokyo Olympics, she twisted her ankle in the heats.

On 8 February 2023, at age 37 and after primarily focusing on being a pacemaker on the international racing circuit before, Yarigo set a significant personal best in the 800 m. She clocked 1:58.48 for second at the indoor Copernicus Cup in Toruń, Poland, improving her 1:59.12 set outdoors at the 2016 Rio de Janeiro Olympics.

== Statistics ==
=== International competitions ===
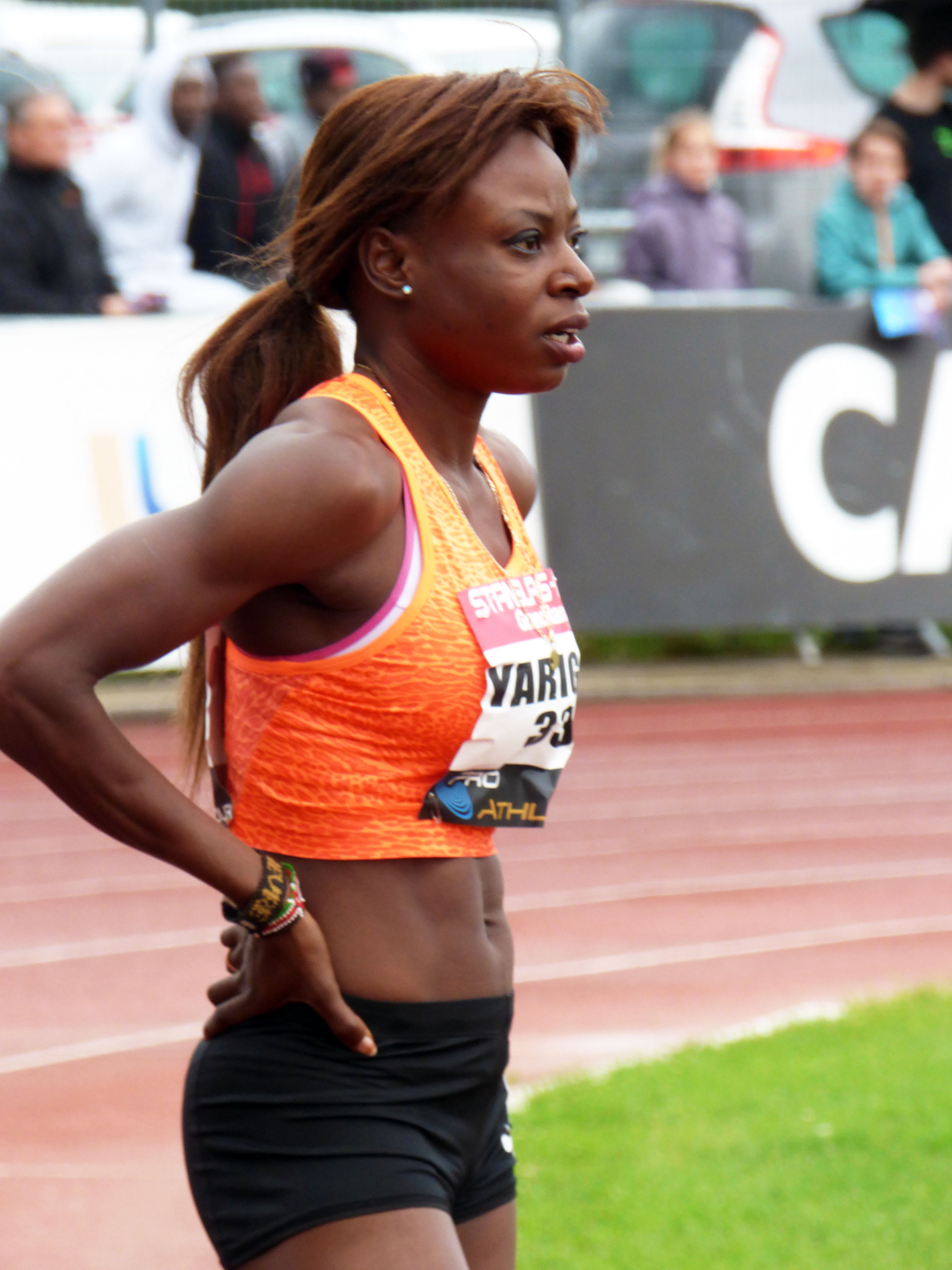
Noelie Yarigo at the Meeting Stanislas in France in 2016

Representing Benin
| Year | Competition | Venue | Position | Event | Time |
|---|---|---|---|---|---|
| 2005 | Jeux de la Francophonie | Niamey, Niger | 6th | 800 m | 2:11.61 |
| 2005 | Jeux de la Francophonie | Niamey, Niger | 5th | 4 × 400 m relay | 3:47.56 |
| 2007 | All-Africa Games | Algiers, Algeria | 16th (h) | 800 m | 2:13.29 |
| 2013 | Jeux de la Francophonie | Nice, France | 9th (h) | 800 m | 2:06.76 |
| 2014 | African Championships | Marrakesh, Morocco | 5th | 800 m | 2:01.64 |
| 2015 | World Championships | Beijing, China | 35th (h) | 800 m | 2:02.48 |
| 2016 | African Championships | Durban, South Africa | 6th | 800 m | 2:02.68 |
| 2016 | Olympic Games | Rio de Janeiro, Brazil | 13th (sf) | 800 m | 1:59.78 |
| 2017 | Islamic Solidarity Games | Baku, Azerbaijan | 3rd | 800 m | 2:02.47 |
| 2017 | Jeux de la Francophonie | Nice, France | 2nd | 800 m | 2:01.27 |
| 2017 | Jeux de la Francophonie | Nice, France | – | 4 × 100 m relay | DNF |
| 2017 | World Championships | London, United Kingdom | 7th (sf) | 800 m | 1:59.74 |
| 2018 | African Championships | Asaba, Nigeria | 7th | 800 m | 2:04.36 |
| 2019 | African Games | Rabat, Morocco | 7th | 800 m | 2:04.66 |
| 2019 | World Championships | Doha, Qatar | 10th (sf) | 800 m | 2:00.75 |
| 2021 | Olympic Games | Tokyo, Japan | 17th (sf) | 800 m | 2:01.41 |
| 2022 | World Championships | Eugene, United States | 22nd (sf) | 800 m | 2:01.52 |
| 2023 | World Championships | Budapest, Hungary | 8th (sf) | 800 m | 1:59.43 |
| 2024 | World Indoor Championships | Glasgow, United Kingdom | 3rd | 800 m | 2:03.15 |
| 2024 | Olympic Games | Paris, France | 22nd (sf) | 800 m | 2:01.35 |
| 2025 | World Indoor Championships | Nanjing, China | 23rd (h) | 800 m | 2:07.88 |
| 2025 | World Championships | Tokyo, Japan | 52nd (h) | 800 m | 2:03.43 |
| 2026 | African Championships | Accra, Ghana | 8th (h) | 800 m | 2:02.71^{1} |

^{1}Did not finish in the final

=== Personal bests ===
- 400 metres – 53.20 (Ouagadougou 2017)
  - 400 metres indoor – 55.11 (Bordeaux 2014) NR
- 800 metres – 1:59.12 (Rio de Janeiro 2016) NR
  - 800 metres indoor – 1:58.48 (Toruń 2023) NR
- 1000 metres – 2:36.30 (Heusden-Zolder 2021) NR
- 1500 metres – 4:20.09 (Blois 2018) NR

Olympic Games
| Preceded by Privel Hinkati; Nafissath Radji | Flag bearer for Benin; Paris 2024 with Valentin Houinato | Succeeded by Incumbent |
