= 2012 African Championships in Athletics – Women's 800 metres =

The women's 800 metres at the 2012 African Championships in Athletics was held at the Stade Charles de Gaulle on 30 June and 1 July.

== Medalists ==
Gold	Francine Niyonsaba; Burundi
Silver	Eunice Sum; Kenya
Bronze	Malika Akkaoui; Morocco

== Records ==
Standing records prior to the 2012 African Championships in Athletics
World record	Jarmila Kratochvílová (TCH)	1:53.28	Munich, Germany	26 July 1983
African record	Pamela Jelimo (KEN)	1:54.01	Zürich, Switzerland	29 August 2008
Championship record	Maria Mutola (MOZ)	1:56.36	Durban, South Africa	27 June 1993

== Schedule ==
Date	Time	Round
30 June 2012	14:40	Round 1
1 July 2012	16:25	Final

== Results ==
=== Round 1 ===
First 3 in each heat (Q) and 2 best performers (q) advance to the Final.

Rank	Heat	Lane	Name	Nationality	Time	Note
1	2	7	Francine Niyonsaba	Burundi	2:02.13	Q, NR
2	2	2	Eunice Sum	Kenya	2:02.16	Q
3	1	5	Malika Akkaoui	Morocco	2:03.07	Q
4	2	4	Sylvia Chesebe	Kenya	2:03.14	Q
5	2	5	Alem Gereziher	Ethiopia	2:03.16	q
6	2	6	Annet Negesa	Uganda	2:03.74	q
7	2	3	Mantegbosch Melese	Ethiopia	2:04.11	
8	1	2	Sofiya Shensu	Ethiopia	2:04.28	Q
9	1	7	Jane Jelagat	Kenya	2:04.34	Q
10	1	4	Mandie Brandt	South Africa	2:05.38	
11	1	3	Noëllie Yarigo	Benin	2:06.72	NR
12	1	8	Annabelle Lascar	Mauritius	2:07.70	
13	2	8	Fatimoh Muhammed	Liberia	2:10.89	
	1	6	Aiche Bilal Fall	Mauritania	DNS	
	1	1	Agnes Mansaray	Sierra Leone	DNS	

=== Final ===
Rank	Lane	Name	Nationality	Time	Note
1st place, gold medalist(s)	8	Francine Niyonsaba	Burundi	1:59.11	NR
2nd place, silver medalist(s)	3	Eunice Sum	Kenya	1:59.13	
3rd place, bronze medalist(s)	4	Malika Akkaoui	Morocco	1:59.90	
4	7	Sylvia Chesebe	Kenya	2:01.66	
5	2	Alem Gereziher	Ethiopia	2:02.68	
6	6	Annet Negesa	Uganda	2:02.84	
7	5	Jane Jelagat	Kenya	2:02.92	
8	1	Sofiya Shensu	Ethiopia	2:07.09	
