= Zahra Bouras =

Algerian track and field athlete

Personal information
- Nationality: Algerian
- Born: January 13, 1987 (age 39)

Sport
- Sport: Running
- Event: 800 meters

Achievements and titles
- Personal bests: 400 m: 52.98 NR 800 m: 1:58.78
Medal record
Women's athletics
Representing Algeria
African Championships
Gold medal – first place	2010 Nairobi	800 m

Zahra Bouras (born 13 January 1987) is an Algerian track and field athlete, specialising in the 400 metres and 800 metres. She is the Algerian national record holder in 400 metres and the 2010 African champion at 800 metres. Bouras on 5 June 2012 failed a post-race doping control – testing positive for the banned anabolic steroid stanozolol – and was given a two-year ban from competition.

== Biography ==
Zahra Bouras is the daughter of Amar Bouras, a former athlete and coach of Hassiba Boulmerka, the first Algerian to win an Olympic title. Bouras competed initially at senior level in the 400 metres, setting an Algerian national record time of 52.98 seconds for the distance in Rehlingen on 1 June 2009. Subsequently, racing primarily at 800 metres, Bouras achieved her international breakthrough in June 2010, breaking the two-minute barrier for the first time in taking victory at Josef Odložil Memorial in Prague. Bouras took her first major title at the 2010 African Championships in Athletics in Nairobi, defeating former world champion and home favourite Janeth Jepkosgei to win the 800 metres title. The victory earned her selection for the African team at the IAAF Continental Cup in Split, Croatia, where she finished in 6th position.

In 2011, Bouras improved her personal best over 800 metres to 1:59.21 minutes in taking a second consecutive win at the Josef Odložil Memorial. She competed in the world championships, progressing to the semi-final stage in the 800 metres.

Bouras improved her 800 metres personal best to 1:58.78 in victory at the Pro Athlé Tour event in Montreuil on 5 June 2012. However, she failed the post-race doping control – testing positive for the banned anabolic steroid stanozolol – and was stripped of her win and given a two-year ban from competition, ruling her out of the 2012 African Championships in Athletics and Olympic Games.

== Personal bests ==
Event	Time (m:s)	Venue	Date
400 m	52.98	Rehlingen, Germany	1 June 2009
800 m	1:58.78	France, Montreuil-sous-Bois	5 June 2012
