= Winnie Nanyondo =

Ugandan middle-distance runner

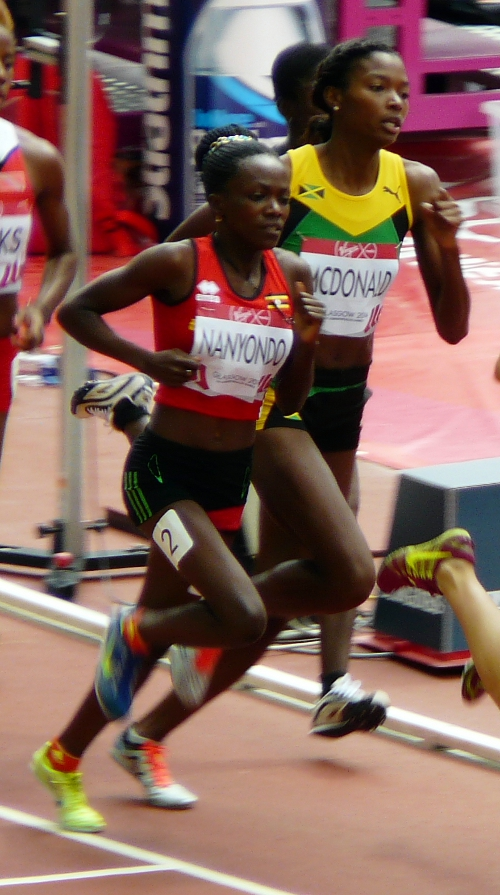
- Nanyondo (left) competing at the 2014 Commonwealth Games

Personal information
- Nationality: Ugandan
- Born: 23 August 1993 (age 32)

Sport
- Country: Uganda
- Sport: Athletics
- Events: Middle-, Long-distance running

Achievements and titles
- Personal bests: 800 m: 1:58.63 (Monaco 2014); 1000 m: 2:36.13 (Rabat 2018); 1500 m: 3:59.56 NR (Rabat 2019); Mile: 4:18.65 NR (Monaco 2019); 3000 m: 8:52.30 (Doha 2022); 5000 m: 15:57.16 (Valencia 2020); Indoors; 800 m: 2:01.70i (Metz 2020); 1000 m: 2:37.80 NR (Liévin 2019); 1500 m: 4:03.54 NR (Toruń 2022); Mile: 4:29.40 NR (Birmingham 2019)
Medal record
Women's athletics
Representing Uganda
Commonwealth Games
Bronze medal – third place	2014 Glasgow	800 m

Winnie Nanyondo (born 23 August 1993, in Mulago) is a Ugandan middle- and long-distance runner. She has represented her native country in several important international events, including both the 2016 Rio Olympics and 2020 Tokyo Olympics, the 2014 World University Cross Country Championships, the 2014 Commonwealth Games, the 2013 Summer Universiade, and the 2012 World Junior Championships in Athletics.

== Career ==
=== 2012–2013 ===
At the 2012 World Junior Championships, she reached the final in the 800 metres after running a personal best of 2:02.38 in her semi-final. The final was won by American Ajee' Wilson in a personal best of 2:00.91, with Nanyondo finishing a disappointing last in 2:07.23.

A year later, at the 2013 Summer Universiade in the 800 metres, her 2:02.96 finish time in the semi-finals was not fast enough to advance to the final. Nor did her 4:28.77 finish time in the semi-finals of the 1500 metres qualify her for the final.

=== 2014 ===
In 2014, Uganda hosted the Universiade World Cross Country Championships. Nanyondo took a 30-second victory to lead the home team to a 1-2-3 sweep and the team championship.

Later in the year, she improved her track performance, taking her 800 metres time under 2:00.00 with a 1:59.27 race-winning performance in the Golden Spike Ostrava meet.

A little more than a month later, at the Herculis meet in Monaco, she again improved her personal best in the 800 meters to 1:58.63, which placed her third behind second-place finisher and 2013 world champion Eunice Sum (1:57.92) and the winner Ajee' Wilson (1:57.67).

At the 2014 Commonwealth Games in Glasgow, Scotland, Nanyondo won a bronze medal for finishing third in the 800 metres final with a time of 2:01.38, just behind Sum of Kenya and Lynsey Sharp of Scotland.

=== 2015–2016 ===
In 2015 and 2016, she raced slower than her personal best in the 800 metres, failing to run faster than 2 minutes flat. She ran her season's best time of 2:01.97 at a race in Kortrijk, Belgium on 11 July 2015, finishing third. At the 2016 Olympic Games in Rio de Janeiro, she did not advance out of the first round of the 800 metres event, finishing sixth in heat #5 in a time of 2:02.77.

However, she improved her personal best at 1500 metres in Kawasaki, Japan, on 10 May 2015, finishing the race in 4:17.13.

== Education ==
She is an industrial art and design student at Kampala University.

== International competitions ==
Representing Uganda
Year	Competition	Venue	Position	Event	Notes
2012	World Junior Championships	Barcelona, Spain	8th	800 m	2:07.23
2013	Universiade	Kazan, Russia	10th (sf)	800 m	2:02.96
2013	Universiade	Kazan, Russia	18th (h)	1500 m	4:28.77
2014	Commonwealth Games	Glasgow, United Kingdom	3rd	800 m	2:01.38
2015	African Games	Brazzaville, Republic of the Congo	7th	800 m	2:04.53
2016	Olympic Games	Rio de Janeiro, Brazil	47th (h)	800 m	2:02.77
2017	World Championships	London, United Kingdom	29th (h)	800 m	2:02.65
2018	Commonwealth Games	Gold Coast, Australia	4th	800 m	2:00.36
2018	Commonwealth Games	Gold Coast, Australia	10th	1500 m	4:06.05
2018	African Championships	Asaba, Nigeria	5th	800 m	1:59.41
2018	African Championships	Asaba, Nigeria	5th	1500 m	4:16.55
2019	World Championships	Doha, Qatar	4th	800 m	1:59.18
2019	World Championships	Doha, Qatar	11th	1500 m	4:00.63
2021	Olympic Games	Tokyo, Japan	13th (sf)	800 m	1:59.84
2021	Olympic Games	Tokyo, Japan	7th	1500 m	3:59.80
2022	World Indoor Championships	Belgrade, Serbia	4th	1500 m i	4:04.60
2022	World Championships	Eugene, United States	8th	1500 m	4:01.98
2023	World Championships	Budapest, Hungary	47th (h)	1500 m	4:10.55
2024	Olympic Games	Paris, France	8th (rep)	1500 m	4:06.35
