= Nelly Jepkosgei =

Bahraini-born middle-distance runner

Personal information
- Born: 14 July 1991 (age 35)

Sport
- Sport: Athletics
- Events: 800 metres,1500 metres

Achievements and titles
- Personal bests: 800 m: 1:57.69 (2024) NR; 1500 m: 3:57.61 (2026)

Nelly Jepkosgei (also known as Nelly Korir) (born 14 July 1991) is a middle-distance runner who specialises in the 800 metres. Born in Kenya, she has represented Bahrain internationally since 2017.

== Career ==
Until she was 26 years old, Jepkosgei represented Kenya included events at the 2010 World Junior Championships in Athletics and the 2011 All-Africa Games. She transferred her athletics nationality from Kenya to Bahrain during a complex and protracted process. She began to run under the Bahrain flag from March 2017 for some events, but did not fully transfer to Bahrain for World Athletics sanctioned events until August 2021.

She has won three times on the IAAF Diamond League circuit, taking wins at the Memorial Van Damme in 2013, and Athletissima and the Meeting International Mohammed VI d'Athlétisme de Rabat in 2019.

In March 2021, Jepkosgei received a three-year competition ban due to tampering with anti-doping procedures. She admitted that she had faked documents relating to a car accident to explain her absence from testing.

After serving her suspension, she competed in the 800 m at the August 2024 Paris Olympics, but finished 5th in both the heat and the repechage rounds. In September, at the Volksbank Trier Eifel Flutlichtmeeting in Trier, Germany, she won the women's 800 m with a time of 1:57.69, breaking her own Bahraini record. At the World Championships held in Tokyo in September 2025, she placed fifth in the heats

In June 2026, she placed 6th in the 1500 m at the Meeting de Paris with a personal best time of 3:57.61. At the 2026 Asian Games held in Nagoya, Japan in September, she won the 1500 m in a games record time of 4:04:50 and placed second in the 800 m in a time of 2:05:16.

== Personal life ==
Jepkosgei is married with two children.

== International competitions ==
Year	Competition	Venue	Position	Event	Notes
2010	World Junior Championships	Moncton, Canada	3rd (sf3)	800 m	2:05.13
2011	All-Africa Games	Maputo, Mozambique	4th	800 m	2:05.35
2024	Olympics	Paris, France	5th (rep)	800 m	2:01.12
2025	World Championships	Tokyo, Japan	5th (h)	800 m	2:02.63
2026	Asian Games	Nagoya, Japan	1st	1500 m	4:04.50
2026	Asian Games	Nagoya, Japan	2nd	800 m	2:05.16

== Circuit wins ==
800 metres

- IAAF Diamond League
  - Athletissima: 2019
  - Meeting International Mohammed VI d'Athlétisme de Rabat: 2019
- IAAF World Challenge
  - Nanjing World Challenge: 2019

== Personal bests ==
- 600 meters: 1:24.94 (2024)
- 800 metres: 1:57.69 (2024) NR
- 1000 metres: 2:35.30 (2018) NR
- 1500 metres: 3:57.61 (2026)
- Mile: 4:25.15 (2017)
