= Carla Mendes =

Cape Verdean runner

Carla Mendes (born 9 November 1994) is a Portuguese-Cape Verdean runner who specializes in the 800 and 1500 metres.

As a Portuguese citizen she became national 1500 metres champion in 2017 and 2018. From 1 August 2018, though, she represented Cape Verde in international competitions.

She finished eleventh at the 2018 African Championships (1500 m). She also competed at the 2019 African Games and the 2019 World Championships (1500 m) without reaching the final.

Her personal best times are 2:05.76 minutes in the 800 metres, achieved in July 2019 in Barcelona; and 4:16.06 minutes in the 1500 metres, achieved in June 2019 in Huelva. The latter is the current Cape Verdean record.
