= Eunice Sum =

Kenyan middle-distance runner

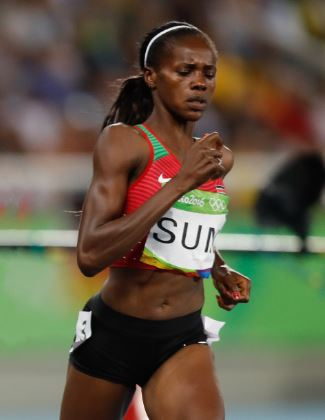
- Sum at the 2016 Rio Olympics

Personal information
- Born: 10 April 1988 (age 38) Kesses, Uasin Gishu County, Kenya
- Height: 170 cm (5 ft 7 in)
- Weight: 54 kg (119 lb)

Sport
- Country: Kenya
- Sport: Athletics
- Event: Middle-distance running

Achievements and titles
- Personal best: 800 m: 1:56.99 (Paris 2015)
Medal record
Women's athletics
Representing Kenya
World Championships
Gold medal – first place	2013 Moscow	800 m
Bronze medal – third place	2015 Beijing	800 m
Diamond League
First place	2013	800 m
First place	2014	800 m
First place	2015	800 m
African Championships
Gold medal – first place	2014 Marrakesh	800 m
Silver medal – second place	2012 Porto-Novo	800 m
Commonwealth Games
Gold medal – first place	2014 Glasgow	800 m
Continental Cup
Representing Africa
Gold medal – first place	2014 Marrakesh	800 m

Eunice Jepkoech Sum (born 10 April 1988) is a Kenyan middle-distance runner who specializes in the 800 metres. She was the 2013 World champion and won the bronze medal in 2015. Sum took a silver and a gold at the 2012 and 2014 African Championships in Athletics respectively. She was also 2014 Commonwealth Games gold medallist and a three-time successive Diamond League winner in 2013–15.

== Career ==
Sum was born in the village of Kesses in Uasin Gishu County in the former Rift Valley Province and competed in the heptathlon and handball at school. She gave birth to a daughter Diana Jeruto in 2008 and only began a full-time athletics career in 2009 after being spotted competing in a heptathlon event by former 800 metres world champion Janeth Jepkosgei. At her invitation, Sum moved to Eldoret to train with Jepkosgei's group.

She made her international championship début in the 800 metres at the 2010 African Championships in Athletics in Nairobi, but failed to make the final. In 2011, Sum set a personal best time of 1:59.66 in finishing second over 800 m at the Kenyan championships. This performance qualified Sum for the event at the 2011 World Championships in Athletics in Daegu, South Korea, where she reached the semi-finals.

Sum won a silver medal – her first medal in international competition – in the 800 m at the 2012 African Championships in Athletics in Porto-Novo, Benin. She ran a personal best of 1:59.13 in the final, finishing two hundredths of a second behind Burundi's Francine Niyonsaba. Sum then competed in the 1500 m at the London Olympics, but finished a disappointing 10th in her heat and failed to qualify for the semi-finals.

Sum progressed to the highest ranks of international competition in 2013, reaching her first global final and defeating Olympic champion and home favourite Mariya Savinova to win a surprise 800 m gold in a personal best time of 1:57.38 at the World Championships in Moscow. The Kenyan defeated Savinova again at the Weltklasse Zürich meeting to add the 2013 Diamond League crown in the 800 m to her world title. She won the 800 m at the 2014 Commonwealth Games.

== Personal life ==
Sum is the first cousin of Alfred Kirwa Yego, the 2007 world champion in the 800 metres. She is a fan of Chelsea FC.

== Achievements ==
=== International competitions ===
Representing Kenya
Year	Competition	Venue	Position	Event	Notes
2010	African Championships	Nairobi, Kenya	9th (h)	800 m	2:08.71
2011	World Championships	Daegu, South Korea	13th (sf)	800 m	1:59.94
2012	African Championships	Porto-Novo, Benin	2nd	800 m	1:59.13
2012	Olympic Games	London, United Kingdom	38th (h)	1500 m	4:16.95
2013	World Championships	Moscow, Russia	1st	800 m	1:57.38
2014	World Relays	Nassau, Bahamas	2nd	4 × 800 m relay	8:04.28
2014	Commonwealth Games	Glasgow, United Kingdom	1st	800 m	2:00.31
2014	African Championships	Marrakesh, Morocco	1st	800 m	1:59.45
2014	Continental Cup	Marrakesh, Morocco	1st	800 m	1:58.21
2015	World Championships	Beijing, China	3rd	800 m	1:58.18
2016	Olympic Games	Rio de Janeiro, Brazil	19th (sf)	800 m	2:00.88
2018	African Championships	Asaba, Nigeria	9th (h)	800 m	2:03.38
2019	World Championships	Doha, Qatar	5th	800 m	1:59.71
2021	Olympic Games	Tokyo, Japan	34th (h)	800 m	2:03.00

=== Circuit wins and titles, National championships ===
- Diamond League 800 m overall winner (3): 2013, 2014, 2015

800 metres wins, other events specified in parentheses

- 2013 (2): Stockholm DN Galan, Zürich Weltklasse
- 2014 (4): Doha Qatar Athletic Super Grand Prix, Rome Golden Gala, Oslo Bislett Games (SB), Lausanne Athletissima (SB)
- 2015 (5): Shanghai Golden Grand Prix, Eugene Prefontaine Classic (WL), Paris Meeting (WL), London Anniversary Games, Zürich

- Kenyan Athletics Championships
  - 800 metres (2): 2012, 2014

=== Personal bests ===
- 800 metres 1:56.99 (Paris 2015)
- 1500 metres 4:01.54 (Eugene 2014)
- 3000 metres 8:53.12 (Eugene 2012)
