= Melissa Bishop-Nriagu =

Canadian middle-distance runner

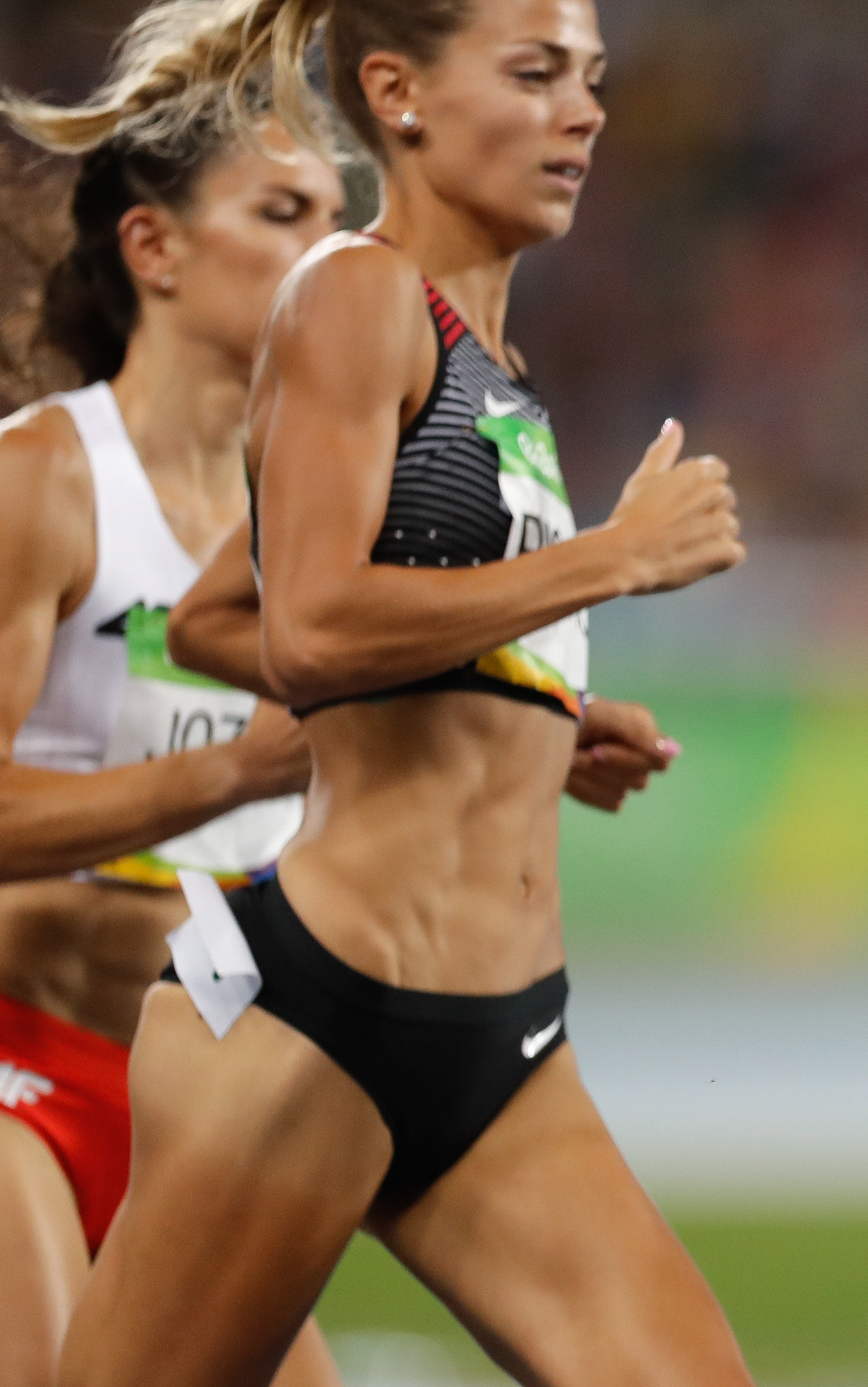
- Bishop at the 2016 Rio Olympics

Personal information
- Born: Melissa Bishop; August 5, 1988 (age 38) Eganville, Ontario, Canada
- Height: 173 cm (5 ft 8 in)
- Weight: 56 kg (123 lb)
- Spouse: Osi Nriagu (m. 2017)

Sport
- Country: Canada
- Sport: Athletics
- Event: 800 metres
- University team: University of Windsor

Achievements and titles
- Personal bests: 400 m: 56.21 (Ottawa 2011); 800 m: 1:57.01 NR (Monte Carlo 2017); 1000 m: 2:38.75 (Amsterdam 2014)
Medal record
Women's athletics
Representing Canada
World Championships
Silver medal – second place	2015 Beijing	800 m
Pan American Games
Gold medal – first place	2015 Toronto	800 m
Jeux de la Francophonie
Silver medal – second place	2013 Nice	4x400 m relay
Bronze medal – third place	2013 Nice	800 m

Melissa Bishop-Nriagu, née Melissa Bishop, (born August 5, 1988) is a retired Canadian runner who specialized in the 800 metres. She competed at the 2012, 2016 Olympics and 2020 Olympics. She won a silver medal at the 2015 World Athletics Championships. Her World Championship medal was a Canadian woman's first-ever medal in the 800 m. Bishop-Nriagu graduated from the University of Windsor and was the third Canadian woman to run the 800 m in under two minutes. She has held the Canadian record at the distance since 2017.

== Career ==
At the 2012 Summer Olympics, Bishop-Nriagu placed sixth in her heat and did not advance to the semi-finals.

Her next major sporting event was the 2015 Pan American Games located in her home country of Canada. There, Bishop-Nriagu competed in the 800m in Toronto; in the final, she ran a time of 1:59.62 to win the gold and the title of Pan Am champion. Of the home crowd Bishop-Nriagu said, "I knew the crowd was going to be loud no matter what, so I was just trying to put myself in a good position to be able to run through. I'm really happy it worked out. It's so nice to win a gold medal at home."

Bishop-Nriagu finished second in the 800 meters at the 2015 World Championships in Athletics in Beijing. She set a national record in the semi-finals while winning in 1:57.52, beating a record set by Diane Cummins which had stood for 14 years. The final, a race characterized by several pace changes up and down, saw Bishop-Nriagu in a three-way sprint to the medals where she finished in second place. After the race, she said, "It's really a dream come true. Our training has been really consistent over the last few years. This year, we've really worked on a few things, and I've been waiting for the right race. I'm really happy that it came here at the [world] championships."

The 2016 Rio Olympics saw Bishop-Nriagu compete as a part of Canada's Olympic team. She was ranked third in the world as of July 27, 2016, after posting a national record of 1:57.43 in Edmonton, on July 16. Bishop-Nriagu finished fourth in the 800 m final in Rio de Janeiro, again setting a new national record for the 800 m with a 1:57.02 finish. Caster Semenya would win gold, while Francine Niyonsaba took silver and Margaret Wambui would pass Bishop-Nriagu for bronze in the final 50 m, beating her by 0.13s. It was later shown that all three podium finishers were intersex and were competing with elevated testosterone levels. A teary-eyed Bishop-Nriagu said after the race that "It's really kind of hard to describe this right now. This is what we work for for a decade and to be that close...this is tough."

Following her pregnancy in 2018 and injury struggles in 2019, Bishop-Nriagu resumed competition and qualified to her third consecutive Canadian Olympic team, this time for the 2020 Summer Olympics in Tokyo. Bishop aimed to improve on her prior result in the 800 m, but placed fourth in her heat with a time of 2:02.11 and did not qualify to the semi-finals. Speaking afterward she said she was disappointed while noting that she had been dealing with a hamstring injury and that, ultimately, she was proud of what she had accomplished in returning to the Games.

== Personal life ==
Born in Eganville, Ontario, Bishop-Nriagu lives by Lake Doré with her parents, Alison and Doug Bishop. She married fellow Canadian athlete Osi Nriagu in October 2017. The couple announced they were expecting their first child in February 2018 with the baby due in June 2018. Their daughter was born on Monday, July 2, 2018. A second daughter was born to the couple July 25, 2022.

== Achievements ==
- 2nd, 800 meters; 2015 Beijing, World Championships, China
- 2nd, 2012 National Championships, Calgary, Canada (Olympic "A" Standard).
- Personal best: 1:57.01, a Canadian record for the outdoor 800 m, set at the Herculis meeting in Monaco on July 21, 2017
