= Angie Petty =

New Zealand middle-distance runner

Personal information
- Full name: Angela Kate Petty
- Born: Angela Kate Smit; 16 August 1991 (age 35) Christchurch, New Zealand
- Education: University of Canterbury
- Height: 1.68 m (5 ft 6 in)
- Weight: 57 kg (126 lb)
- Spouse: Sam Petty (m. 2014)

Sport
- Sport: Track and field
- Event: 800 m
- Coached by: Danny Mackey
Medal record
Women's athletics
Representing New Zealand
Summer Universiade
Gold medal – first place	2015 Gwangju	800 m

Angela Kate Petty (née Smit; born 16 August 1991) is a New Zealand middle-distance athlete.

== Biography ==
Born in Christchurch in 1991, she was educated at Rangiora High School. In 2007, she won the New Zealand secondary schools 800 m title, clocking 2:11.42.

The following year Petty represented New Zealand in the 800 m at the World Junior Championships in Bydgoszcz, Poland, finishing fourth in her semi-final in a time of 2:08.73, and she successfully defended her national schools 800 m title. At the Athletics Canterbury Awards in 2010, she was co-winner with Tom Walsh of the junior athlete of the year award.

She competed in the 800 m at the 2010 World Junior Championships, where she was again eliminated in the semi-finals, finishing in 2:05.51.

At the 2012 New Zealand championships, she won the 800 m title and was second in both the 400 m and 1500 m. In July that year, she ran the 800 m in 2:00.67 at a meet in Heusden, Belgium, just failing to qualify for the New Zealand team for the 2012 Olympics.

Petty and Walsh were joint winners of Athletics Canterbury's athlete of the year award in 2013. In July 2013, she ran a personal best of 2:00.03 for 800 m in finishing fourth at the World University Games in Kazan, and backed it up two weeks later with 2:00.42 to finish fifth in the Diamond League meet in London. At the World Athletics Championships in Moscow the following month, she clocked 2:00.60 in finishing fourth in her 800 m heat and did not progress further.

Petty represented New Zealand in the 800 m at the 2014 Commonwealth Games in Glasgow, finishing fifth in the final in a time of 2.01:94.

Petty studied for a Bachelor of Arts degree in education at the University of Canterbury, Christchurch. In 2014, she married British triathlete Sam Petty.

== Personal bests ==
Event	Time	Venue	Date
400 m	54.15	Mannheim, Germany	29 July 2016
600 m	1:26.72	Liège, Belgium	5 July 2012
800 m	1:59.06	Gwangju, South Korea	10 July 2015
1000 m	2:37.82	Chiba, Japan	15 August 2015
1500 m	4:07.83	Turku, Finland	29 June 2016
Mile	4:43.66	Wanganui, New Zealand	20 January 2014
