= Emily Cherotich Tuei =

Kenyan middle-distance runner

Personal information
- Nationality: Kenyan
- Born: 13 May 1986 (age 40)

Sport
- Sport: Middle-distance running
- Event: 800 metres
Medal record
Women's athletics
Representing Kenya
African Championships
| Bronze medal – third place | 2016 Durban | 800 m |

Emily Cherotich Tuei (born 13 May 1986) is a Kenyan middle-distance runner. She competed in the women's 800 metres at the 2017 World Championships in Athletics.

In June 2021, she qualified to represent Kenya at the 2020 Summer Olympics.
