= Tsepang Sello =

Lesotho middle-distance runner

Personal information
- Born: Maseru, Maseru District, Lesotho

Tsepang Gladys Sello (born February 23, 1997) is a Mosotho middle-distance runner. She competed at the 2016 Summer Olympics in the women's 800 metres race; her time of 2:10.22 in the heats did not qualify her for the semifinals.
