= 2026 African Championships in Athletics – Women's 800 metres =

Women's 800 metres at the 2026 African Championships in Athletics
- Venue: Legon Sports Stadium
- Location: Accra, Ghana
- Dates: 13–14 May
- Competitors: 19 from 14 nations
- Winning time: 1:59.02

Medalists
gold medal	Msgana Hailu	Ethiopia
silver medal	Oratile Nowe	Botswana
bronze medal	Samira Awali Boubacar	Niger

The women's 800 metres event at the 2026 African Championships in Athletics was held on 13 and 14 May in Accra, Ghana.

== Results ==
=== Heats ===
First 3 of each heat (Q) and the next 2 fastest (q) qualified for the final.

Rank	Heat	Athlete	Nationality	Time	Notes
1	1	Oratile Nowe	Botswana	2:01.33	Q
2	1	Msgana Hailu	Ethiopia	2:01.33	Q
3	1	Samira Awali Boubacar	Niger	2:01.49	Q
4	2	Souad Elhaddad	Morocco	2:01.97	Q
5	2	Vivian Chebet Kiprotich	Kenya	2:02.28	Q
6	1	Habtam Gebeyehu	Ethiopia	2:02.31	q
7	2	Tigist Ayana	Ethiopia	2:02.66	Q
8	1	Noélie Yarigo	Benin	2:02.71	q
9	2	Manqabang Tsibela	Lesotho	2:04.26	
10	2	Alice Ekiru	Kenya	2:04.76	
11	2	Odette Sawekoua	Benin	2:05.17	
12	1	Pauline Muhonja	Kenya	2:06.01	
13	2	Honorine Iribagiza	Rwanda	2:06.24	
14	1	Comfort James	Nigeria	2:06.25	
15	1	Christabel Kunda	Zambia	2:06.35	
16	1	Angala Tuuliki	Namibia	2:08.64	
17	2	Perina Lokure Nakang	ART	2:10.03	
18	2	Maureen Chebet	Uganda	2:11.38	
19	2	Joana Haleca	Angola	2:14.62	
	1	Kanari Teclemaryam	Eritrea	DNS	

=== Final ===
Rank	Athlete	Nationality	Time	Notes
1st place, gold medalist(s)	Msgana Hailu	Ethiopia	1:59.02	
2nd place, silver medalist(s)	Oratile Nowe	Botswana	1:59.09	
3rd place, bronze medalist(s)	Samira Awali Boubacar	Niger	1:59.63	
4	Souad Elhaddad	Morocco	2:00.22	
5	Vivian Chebet Kiprotich	Kenya	2:00.94	
6	Tigist Ayana	Ethiopia	2:01.49	
7	Habtam Gebeyehu	Ethiopia	2:01.53	
	Noélie Yarigo	Benin	DNF	
