= Soukaina Hajji =

Moroccan athlete (born 1997)

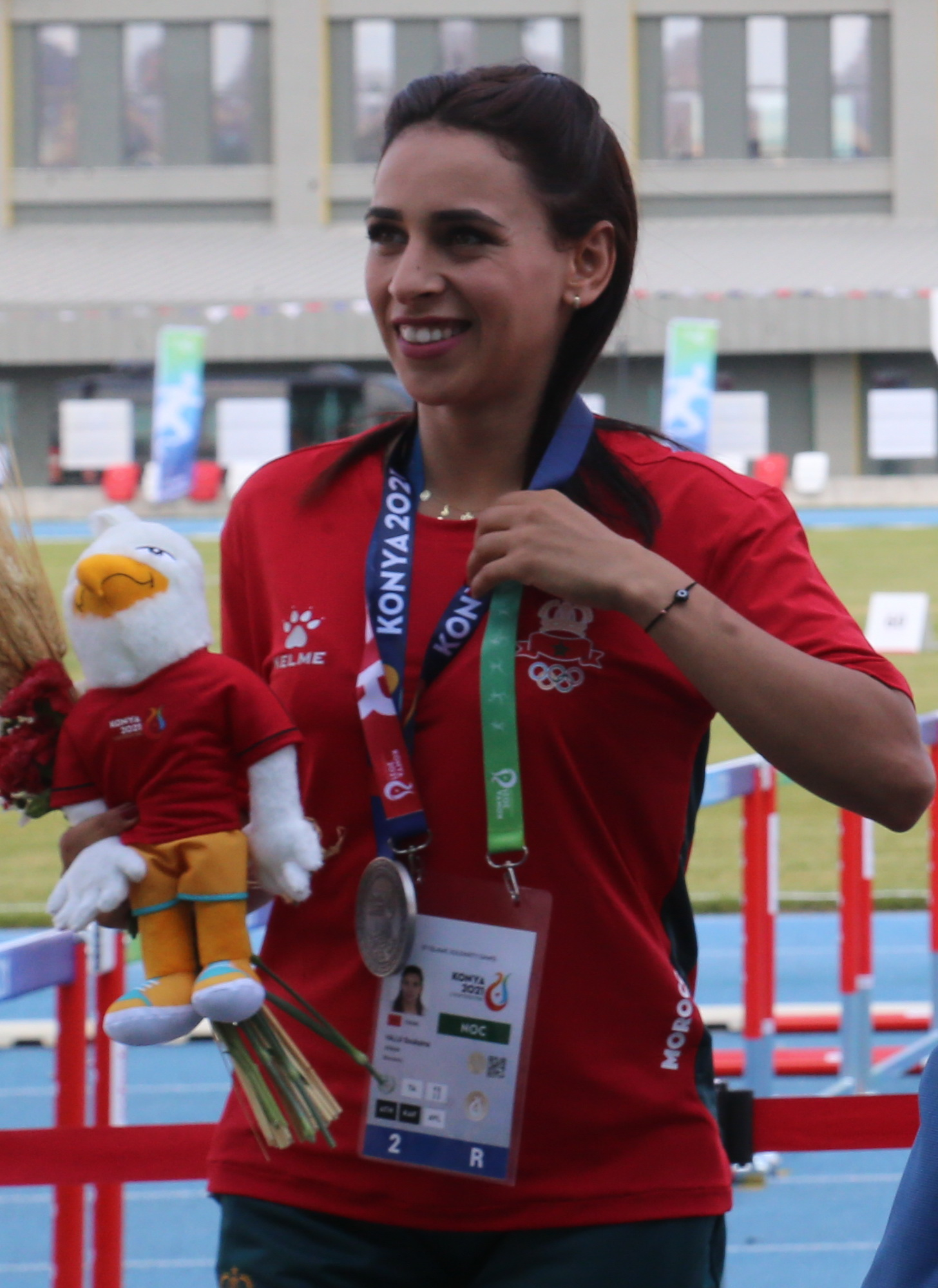

Personal information
- Born: 4 February 1997 (age 29)

Sport
- Sport: Athletics
- Events: Middle distance running, Cross Country running

Achievements and titles
- Personal bests: 800m: 2:00.07 (Rabat, 2025); 1500m: 4:00.62 (Paris, 2026)
Medal record
Women's athletics
Representing Morocco
African Championships
Bronze medal – third place	2024 Douala	800 m
Jeux de la Francophonie
Silver medal – second place	2023 Kinshasa	1500m
Silver medal – second place	2023 Kinshasa	800m
Islamic Solidarity Games
Silver medal – second place	2022 Konya	800 m
Bronze medal – third place	2025 Riyadh	800 m
Arab Athletics Championships
Gold medal – first place	2021 Tunis	800 m

Soukaina Hajji (born 4 February 1997) is a Moroccan middle-distance and cross country runner.

== Biography ==
Hajji won the gold medal over 800 metres At the 2021 Arab Athletics Championships in Tunis. She was a silver medalist in the 800 metres at the delayed 2021 Islamic Solidarity Games held in Konya, Turkey, in August 2022, running a time of 2:02.78.

Hajji competed for Morocco at the 2023 World Athletics Cross Country Championships in Bathurst, Australia, helping Morocco to a seventh-place finish in the Mixed Cross Country Relay. She won the bronze medal over 1500 metres at the 2023 Francophone Games in Kinshasa, Democratic Republic of Congo. She also won a silver medal in the 800 metres at the Games.

She won the bronze medal behind Kenyan's Sarah Moraa and Lilian Odira at the 2024 African Championships in Douala, Cameroon, over 800 metres.

She competed over 800 metres at the 2025 Meeting International Mohammed VI d'Athlétisme de Rabat, part of the 2025 Diamond League, in May 2025, running a personal best 2:00.07.

She competed for Morocco at the 2025 World Athletics Championships in Tokyo, Japan, but did not qualify for the semi-finals.

In May 2026, she ran a personal best 4:04.79 in the 1500 metres at the 2026 Meeting International Mohammed VI d'Athlétisme de Rabat and lowered it to 4:00.62 on 28 June at the 2026 Meeting de Paris.
