= 2024 World Athletics U20 Championships – Women's 800 metres =

Women's 800 metres at the 2024 World Athletics U20 Championships
- Venue: Estadio Atlético de la VIDENA
- Dates: 27 August 2024 (heats); 28 August (semi-finals); 29 August 2024 (final)
- Competitors: 40 from 29 nations
- Winning time: 2:00.36

Medalists
gold medal	Sarah Moraa	Kenya
silver medal	Claudia Hollingsworth	Australia
bronze medal	Sophia Gorriaran	United States

The women's 800 metres at the 2024 World Athletics U20 Championships was held at the Estadio Atlético de la VIDENA in Lima, Peru on 27, 28 and 29 August 2024.

== Records ==
U20 standing records prior to the 2024 World Athletics U20 Championships were as follows:

Record	Athlete & Nationality	Mark	Location	Date
World U20 Record	Pamela Jelimo (KEN)	1:54.01	Zürich, Switzerland	29 August 2008
Championship Record	Roisin Willis (USA)	1:59.13	Cali, Colombia	3 August 2022
World U20 Leading	Phoebe Gill (GBR)	1:57.86	Belfast, United Kingdom	11 May 2024

== Results ==
=== Heats ===
The first 4 athletes in each heat (Q) and the next 4 fastest (q) qualified to the semi-finals.

==== Heat 1 ====
Rank	Athlete	Nation	Time	Notes
1	Rin Kubo	Japan	2:04.53	Q
2	Aster Areri	Ethiopia	2:04.76	Q, PB
3	Marie Warneke	Germany	2:04.80	Q, PB
4	Carise van Rooyen	South Africa	2:07.51	Q
5	Luise Braga	Brazil	2:07.77	q
6	Maria Avelino	Portugal	2:09.43	
7	Laxita Sandilea	India	2:11.96	
8	Janet Jepkemoi	Kenya	2:15.94	

==== Heat 2 ====
Rank	Athlete	Nation	Time	Notes
1	Sophia Gorriaran	United States	2:07.43	Q
2	Nesrine Abed	Algeria	2:07.46	Q
3	Adéla Holubová	Czech Republic	2:07.78	Q
4	Tara Vučković	Serbia	2:07.93	Q
5	Boh Ritchie	New Zealand	2:08.39	q
6	Layla Haynes	Barbados	2:08.93	
7	Izandri Jacobs	South Africa	2:12.15	
8	Kitania Headley	Jamaica	2:14.81	

==== Heat 3 ====
Rank	Athlete	Nation	Time	Notes
1	Claudia Hollingsworth	Australia	2:08.98	Q
2	Marta Mitjans	Spain	2:09.87	Q
3	Ioulianna Roussou	Greece	2:10.33	Q
4	Claire Uwitonze	Rwanda	2:10.94	Q, PB
5	Stephanie Bertram	Canada	2:12.13	
6	Ka'myya Haywood	United States	2:12.53	
7	Natalia Issler	Switzerland	2:13.41	
8	Hannah Odendahl	Germany	2:13.80	
9	Luciana Fernández	Peru	2:17.78	

==== Heat 4 ====
Rank	Athlete	Nation	Time	Notes
1	Sarah Moraa	Kenya	2:05.11	Q
2	Lorenza De Noni	Italy	2:06.02	Q
3	Kyla Martin	Canada	2:06.20	Q
4	Fleur Cooper	Australia	2:06.80	Q
5	Claudia Costiuc	Romania	2:07.35	q
6	Marte Hovland	Norway	2:08.57	
7	Elena Ban	Croatia	2:12.40	
–	Saida El-Bouzy	Morocco	DNS	

==== Heat 5 ====
Rank	Athlete	Nation	Time	Notes
1	Ngalula Kabangu	Italy	2:06.98	Q
2	Malin Hoelsveen	Norway	2:07.07	Q
3	Marie Chovancová	Czech Republic	2:07.29	Q
4	Isabel Conde Frankenberg	Argentina	2:07.54	Q
5	Elle Ceder	Finland	2:08.18	q
6	Dunja Sikima	Serbia	2:10.31	
7	Sabrina Pena	Brazil	2:10.87	
8	Victoria Guerrier	Haiti	2:11.73	

=== Semi-finals ===
First 2 of each heat (Q) plus 2 fastest times (q) qualify to Final.

==== Heat 1 ====
Rank	Athlete	Nation	Time	Notes
1	Rin Kubo	Japan	2:03.00	Q
2	Sophia Gorriaran	United States	2:03:01	Q
3	Marta Mitjans	Spain	2:03.20	q, PB
4	Fleur Cooper	Australia	2:05.14	PB
5	Boh Ritchie	New Zealand	2:05.60	PB
6	Tara Vučković	Serbia	2:06.60	
7	Luise Braga	Brazil	2:14.22	
8	Ioulianna Roussou	Greece	2:15.60	

==== Heat 2 ====
Rank	Athlete	Nation	Time	Notes
1	Claudia Hollingsworth	Australia	2:03.52	Q
2	Marie Warneke	Germany	2:03.83	Q, PB
3	Kyla Martin	Canada	2:05.83	
4	Ngalula Kabangu	Italy	2:05.95	
5	Nesrine Abed	Algeria	2:06.04	
6	Isabel Conde Frankenberg	Argentina	2:07.89	
7	Adéla Holubová	Czech Republic	2:09.17	
8	Claire Uwitonze	Rwanda	2:10.11	PB

==== Heat 3 ====
Rank	Athlete	Nation	Time	Notes
1	Sarah Moraa	Kenya	2:03.44	Q
2	Lorenza De Noni	Italy	2:04.21	Q
3	Aster Areri	Ethiopia	2:04.58	q, PB
4	Marie Chovancová	Czech Republic	2:04.81	PB
5	Elle Ceder	Finland	2:05.36	PB
6	Malin Hoelsveen	Norway	2:05.37	
7	Claudia Costiuc	Romania	2:06.93	
8	Carise van Rooyen	South Africa	2:08.33	

=== Final ===
Rank	Athlete	Nation	Time	Notes
1st place, gold medalist(s)	Sarah Moraa	Kenya	2:00.36	
2nd place, silver medalist(s)	Claudia Hollingsworth	Australia	2:00.87	
3rd place, bronze medalist(s)	Sophia Gorriaran	United States	2:01.04	
4	Marie Warneke	Germany	2:02.88	PB
5	Lorenza De Noni	Italy	2:03.20	PB
6	Rin Kubo	Japan	2:03.31	
7	Marta Mitjans	Spain	2:04.15	
8	Aster Areri	Ethiopia	2:09.36	
