= Souad Elhaddad =

Moroccan middle-distance runner (born 2001)

Personal information
- Born: 10 March 2001 (age 25)

Sport
- Sport: Athletics
- Event: Middle-distance running

Achievements and titles
- Personal bests: 800m: 1:58.51 (2026); 1500m: 4:16.00 (2026)
Medal record
Women's athletics
Representing Morocco
African Championships
Bronze medal – third place	2026 Accra	1500 m
Mediterranean Games
Silver medal – second place	2026 Taranto	1500 m
Bronze medal – third place	2026 Taranto	800 m

Souad Elhaddad (born 10 March 2001) is a Moroccan middle-distance runner. She was the bronze medalist over 1500 metres at the 2026 African Championships.

== Biography ==
In May 2023, Elhaddad set a personal best for the 800 metres competing at the 2023 Meeting International Mohammed VI d'Athlétisme de Rabat, placing third in the women's national race. This came a week after she had completed a victorious double in the 800 m and 1500 metres races at the Moroccan University Championships.

In August 2025, she placed fourth in 2:01.97 in the women's 800 metres at the Internationales Nordthüringer Leichtathletikmeeting in Germany. The following month, she was named in the Morocco team for the 2025 World Championships.

Elhaddad was the bronze medalist over 1500 metres at the 2026 African Championships in Accra, Ghana, finishing behind Karabo More and Vivian Chebet Kiprotich in extremely wet conditions in May 2026, running 4:16.00. She also placed fourth in the women's 800 metres at the championships. Later that month, she ran a personal best 1:58.51 with a top-ten finish in the 800 metres in the 2026 Diamond League meeting in Rabat.
