= 2026 Meeting International Mohammed VI d'Athlétisme de Rabat =

Athletics meeting in Rabat, Morocco

- Dates: 31 May 2026
- Host city: Rabat, Morocco
- Venue: Rabat Olympic Stadium
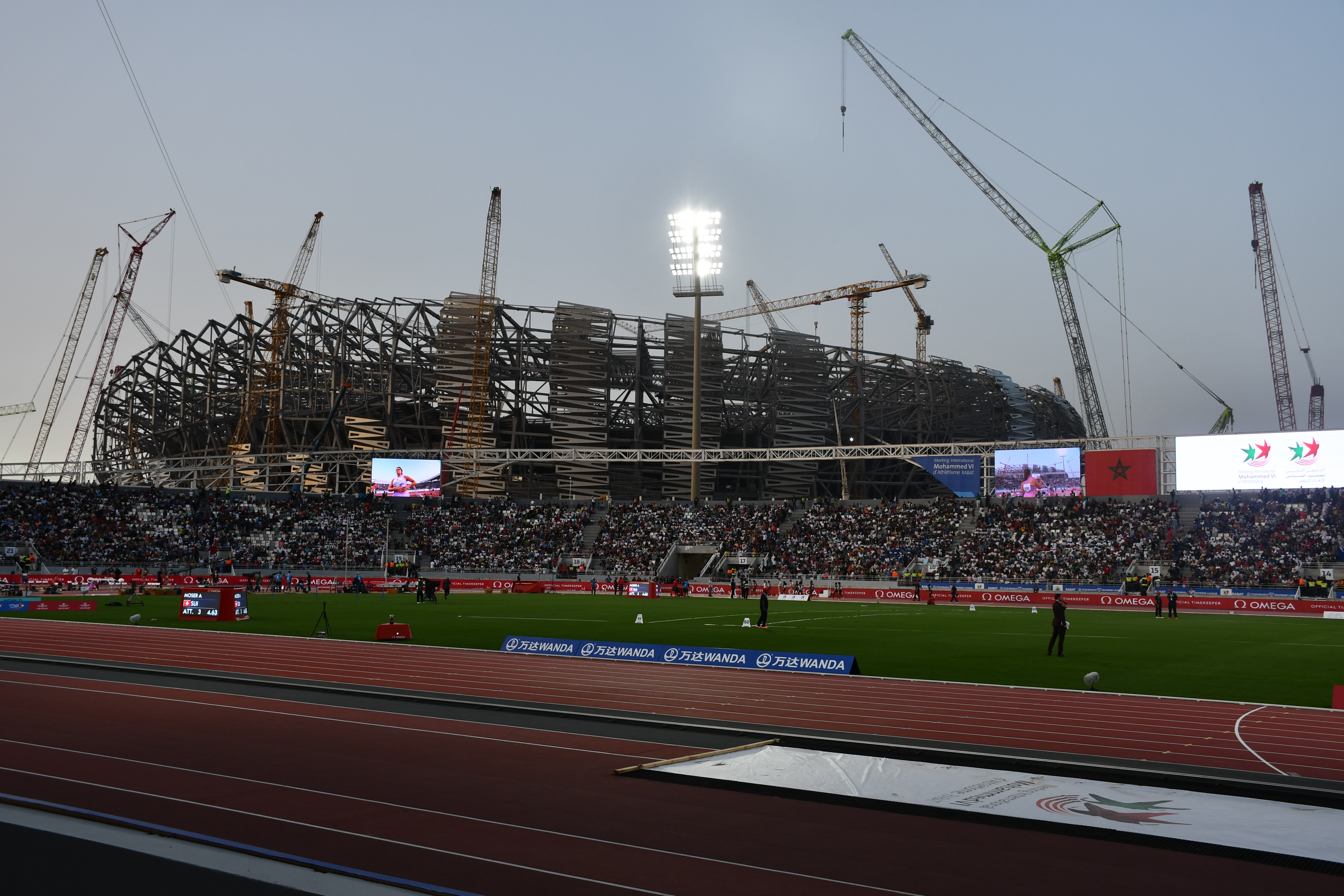
- Level: 2026 Diamond League

The 2026 Meeting International Mohammed VI d'Athlétisme de Rabat was the 17th edition of the annual outdoor track and field meeting in Rabat, Morocco. Held on 31 May at the Rabat Olympic Stadium, it was the third leg of the 2026 Diamond League – the highest level international track and field circuit.

== Diamond+ events results ==
=== Men's ===
200 Metres
Place	Athlete	Nation	Time	Points	Notes
1st place, gold medalist(s)	Kenny Bednarek	United States	19.69	8	MR, SB
2nd place, silver medalist(s)	Letsile Tebogo	Botswana	19.96	7	SB
3rd place, bronze medalist(s)	Sinesipho Dambile	South Africa	20.03	6	
4	Cheickna Traore	Ivory Coast	20.15	5	
5	Andre De Grasse	Canada	20.16	4	
6	Yassine Hssine	Morocco	20.18	3	NR
7	Courtney Lindsey	United States	20.21	2	SB
8	Aaron Brown	Canada	20.30	1	
9	Bryan Levell	Jamaica	20.44		
			Wind: (+0.3 m/s)		

400 Metres
Place	Athlete	Nation	Time	Points	Notes
1st place, gold medalist(s)	Jacory Patterson	United States	44.11	8	MR, SB
2nd place, silver medalist(s)	Matthew Hudson-Smith	Great Britain	44.25	7	SB
3rd place, bronze medalist(s)	Khaleb McRae	United States	44.40	6	SB
4	Zakithi Nene	South Africa	44.41	5	
5	Bayapo Ndori	Botswana	44.68	4	
6	Attila Molnár	Hungary	44.73	3	SB
7	Mohamed Yassine Zerhoumi	Morocco	45.44	2	
8	Quincy Hall	United States	45.54	1	SB

3000 Metres steeplechase
Place	Athlete	Nation	Time	Points	Notes
1st place, gold medalist(s)	Soufiane El Bakkali	Morocco	7:57.25	8	WL
2nd place, silver medalist(s)	Frederik Ruppert	Germany	7:57.80	7	AR
3rd place, bronze medalist(s)	Simon Koech	Kenya	7:59.44	6	PB
4	Edmund Serem	Kenya	8:01.61	5	PB
5	Matthew Wilkinson	United States	8:09.56	4	PB
6	Salaheddine Ben Yazide	Morocco	8:10.64	3	SB
7	Mohamed Tindouft	Morocco	8:10.77	2	SB
8	Daniel Arce	Spain	8:11.42	1	SB
9	Faid El Mostafa	Morocco	8:11.64		PB
10	Nicolas-Marie Daru	France	8:11.81		SB
11	Abraham Kibiwot	Kenya	8:12.39		SB
12	Samuel Firewu	Ethiopia	8:12.55		SB
13	Geordie Beamish	New Zealand	8:16.80		SB
14	Baptiste Fourmont	France	8:18.46		SB
15	Djilali Bedrani	France	8:28.03		SB
15	Mohamed Amin Jhinaoui	Tunisia	8:32.18		SB
—	Abderrafia Bouassel	Morocco	DNF		
—	Nahuel Carabaña	Andorra	DNF		PM
—	Alexis Miellet	France	DNF		PM

Shot put
Place	Athlete	Nation	Distance	Points	Notes
1st place, gold medalist(s)	Joe Kovacs	United States	22.58 m	8	MR, WL
2nd place, silver medalist(s)	Ryan Crouser	United States	21.59 m	7	SB
3rd place, bronze medalist(s)	Jordan Geist	United States	21.56 m	6	
4	Roger Steen	United States	21.52 m	5	
5	Leonardo Fabbri	Italy	21.42 m	4	
6	Tom Walsh	New Zealand	21.24 m	3	
7	Rajindra Campbell	Jamaica	21.04 m	2	
8	Adrian Piperi	United States	20.98 m	1	SB
9	Wictor Petersson	Sweden	20.39 m		

=== Women's ===
100 Metres
Place	Athlete	Nation	Time	Points	Notes
1st place, gold medalist(s)	Tina Clayton	Jamaica	10.85	8	SB
2nd place, silver medalist(s)	Lavanya Williams	Jamaica	10.95	7	PB
3rd place, bronze medalist(s)	Jonielle Smith	Jamaica	11.00	6	
4	Patrizia Van der Weken	Luxembourg	11.08	5	SB
5	McKenzie Long	United States	11.19	4	
6	Torrie Lewis	Australia	11.20	3	
7	Zaynab Dosso	Italy	11.25	2	
8	Delphine Nkansa	Belgium	11.34	1	
9	Ajla Del Ponte	Switzerland	11.40		
			Wind: (+0.3 m/s)		

200 Metres
Place	Athlete	Nation	Time	Points	Notes
1st place, gold medalist(s)	Cambrea Sturgis	United States	22.21	8	
2nd place, silver medalist(s)	Kayla White	United States	22.28	7	SB
3rd place, bronze medalist(s)	Audrey Leduc	Canada	22.41	6	SB
4	Shaunae Miller-Uibo	Bahamas	22.42	5	
5	McKenzie Long	United States	22.43	4	
6	Torrie Lewis	Australia	22.78	3	
7	Léonie Pointet	Switzerland	22.85	2	
8	Ajla Del Ponte	Switzerland	23.99	1	
			Wind: (+1.3 m/s)		

Pole Vault
Place	Athlete	Nation	Height	Points	Notes
1st place, gold medalist(s)	Nina Kennedy	Australia	4.80 m	8	
2nd place, silver medalist(s)	Imogen Ayris	New Zealand	4.70 m	7	
3rd place, bronze medalist(s)	Katie Moon	United States	4.70 m	6	
3rd place, bronze medalist(s)	Angelica Moser	Switzerland	4.70 m	6	
5	Emily Grove	United States	4.60 m	4	
5	Olivia McTaggart	New Zealand	4.60 m	4	
7	Molly Caudery	Great Britain	4.60 m	2	
8	Tina Šutej	Slovenia	4.45 m	1	
9	Sandi Morris	United States	4.45 m		
10	Marie-Julie Bonnin	France	4.45 m		

Discus Throw
Place	Athlete	Nation	Distance	Points	Notes
1st place, gold medalist(s)	Valarie Sion	United States	68.75 m	8	
2nd place, silver medalist(s)	Jorinde van Klinken	Netherlands	66.72 m	7	
3rd place, bronze medalist(s)	Laulauga Tausaga	United States	65.94 m	6	
4	Cierra Jackson	United States	65.79 m	5	
5	Feng Bin	China	64.51 m	4	
6	Jayden Ulrich	United States	63.48 m	3	
7	Shanice Craft	Germany	62.59 m	2	
8	Liliana Cá	Portugal	61.86 m	1	
9	Marike Steinacker	Germany	61.84 m		
10	Erika Beistle	United States	61.59 m		
11	Vanessa Kamga	Sweden	59.78 m		

== Diamond events results ==
=== Men's ===
800 Metres
Place	Athlete	Nation	Time	Points	Notes
1st place, gold medalist(s)	Max Burgin	Great Britain	1:42.98	8	SB
2nd place, silver medalist(s)	Emmanuel Wanyonyi	Kenya	1:43.56	7	SB
3rd place, bronze medalist(s)	Slimane Moula	Algeria	1:43.73	6	SB
4	Gabriel Tual	France	1:44.03	5	SB
5	Donavan Brazier	United States	1:44.03	4	SB
6	Eliott Crestan	Belgium	1:44.08	3	
7	Kethobogile Haingura	Botswana	1:44.21	2	
8	Yanis Meziane	France	1:44.38	1	
9	Francesco Pernici	Italy	1:44.40		SB
10	Abdelati El Guesse	Morocco	1:44.62		SB
11	Mark English	Ireland	1:45.00		
12	Imad Bouchajda	Morocco	1:45.15		PB
—	Patryk Sieradzki	Poland	DNF		PM

1500 Metres
Place	Athlete	Nation	Time	Points	Notes
1st place, gold medalist(s)	Yared Nuguse	United States	3:30.35	8	MR, SB
2nd place, silver medalist(s)	Isaac Nader	Portugal	3:30.43	7	SB
3rd place, bronze medalist(s)	Azeddine Habz	France	3:30.68	6	SB
4	Vincent Ciattei	United States	3:30.90	5	PB
5	Tshepo Tshite	South Africa	3:31.53	4	SB
6	Andrew Coscoran	Ireland	3:31.65	3	SB
7	Reynold Cheruiyot	Kenya	3:32.00	2	SB
8	Fouad Messaoudi	Morocco	3:32.11	1	PB
9	Anass Essayi	Morocco	3:32.23		SB
10	Flavien Szot	France	3:32.24		SB
11	Ruben Verheyden	Belgium	3:32.38		SB
12	Narve Gilje Nordås	Norway	3:33.45		
13	Festus Lagat	Kenya	3:33.66		SB
14	José Carlos Pinto	Portugal	3:33.94		
15	Elliot Giles	Great Britain	3:42.41		
—	Mounir Akbache	France	DNF		PM
—	Samuel Pihlström	Sweden	DNF		
—	Žan Rudolf	Slovenia	DNF		PM

Javelin Throw
Place	Athlete	Nation	Distance	Points	Notes
1st place, gold medalist(s)	Anderson Peters	Grenada	86.08 m	8	SB
2nd place, silver medalist(s)	Rumesh Tharanga	Sri Lanka	85.97 m	7	
3rd place, bronze medalist(s)	Keshorn Walcott	Trinidad and Tobago	82.52 m	6	SB
4	Thomas Röhler	Germany	81.61 m	5	
5	Julius Yego	Kenya	80.59 m	4	SB
6	Curtis Thompson	United States	77.88 m	3	
7	Jakub Vadlejch	Czech Republic	77.75 m	2	
8	Dawid Wegner	Poland	71.18 m	1	
—	Jakub Kubínec	Slovakia	NM		

=== Women's ===
800 Metres
Place	Athlete	Nation	Time	Points	Notes
1st place, gold medalist(s)	Audrey Werro	Switzerland	1:56.56	8	MR, SB
2nd place, silver medalist(s)	Tsige Duguma	Ethiopia	1:57.24	7	SB
3rd place, bronze medalist(s)	Lilian Odira	Kenya	1:57.27	6	SB
4	Oratile Nowe	Botswana	1:57.32	5	SB
5	Anaïs Bourgoin	France	1:57.39	4	SB
6	Prudence Sekgodiso	South Africa	1:57.41	3	SB
7	Sarah Billings	Australia	1:57.61	2	PB
8	Sage Hurta-Klecker	United States	1:58.18	1	SB
9	Eloisa Coiro	Italy	1:58.42		PB
10	Souad Elhaddad	Morocco	1:58.51		PB
11	Nigist Getachew	Ethiopia	1:58.58		SB
12	Addison Wiley	United States	2:00.19		
—	Anna Gryc	Poland	DNF		PM

400 Metres hurdles
Place	Athlete	Nation	Time	Points	Notes
1st place, gold medalist(s)	Emma Zapletalová	Slovakia	52.82	8	NR, WL
2nd place, silver medalist(s)	Anna Cockrell	United States	53.18	7	PB
3rd place, bronze medalist(s)	Rushell Clayton	Jamaica	53.75	6	
4	Gianna Woodruff	Panama	54.08	5	SB
5	Amalie Iuel	Norway	54.35	4	
6	Savannah Sutherland	Canada	54.91	3	
7	Ayomide Folorunso	Italy	55.25	2	
8	Andrenette Knight	Jamaica	55.37	1	

High jump
Place	Athlete	Nation	Height	Points	Notes
1st place, gold medalist(s)	Yaroslava Mahuchikh	Ukraine	1.97 m	8	
2nd place, silver medalist(s)	Eleanor Patterson	Australia	1.94 m	4	
3rd place, bronze medalist(s)	Angelina Topić	Serbia	1.94 m	7	
4	Yuliya Levchenko	Ukraine	1.91 m	6	
5	Lamara Distin	Jamaica	1.91 m	5	
6	Charity Hufnagel	United States	1.91 m	3	
7	Elena Kulichenko	Cyprus	1.87 m	2	
8	Maria Żodzik	Poland	1.83 m	1	
9	Vashti Cunningham	United States	1.83 m		
10	Imke Onnen	Germany	1.78 m		

== Promotional events results ==
=== Women's ===
1500 Metres
Place	Athlete	Nation	Time	Notes
1st place, gold medalist(s)	Freweyni Hailu	Ethiopia	3:58.25	SB
2nd place, silver medalist(s)	Haregeweyni Kalayu	Ethiopia	3:59.28	PB
3rd place, bronze medalist(s)	Agathe Guillemot	France	3:59.60	SB
4	Patricia Silva	Portugal	4:00.40	PB
5	Laura Muir	Great Britain	4:00.77	SB
6	Lucia Stafford	Canada	4:00.83	PB
7	Likina Amebaw	Ethiopia	4:01.56	SB
8	Aster Areri	Ethiopia	4:01.70	PB
9	Salomé Afonso	Portugal	4:01.84	SB
10	Nancy Jepngetich	Kenya	4:03.90	PB
11	Caren Chepchirchir	Kenya	4:03.91	PB
12	Yordanos Tsegab	Ethiopia	4:03.99	PB
13	Nelly Jepkosgei	Bahrain	4:04.57	SB
14	Bérénice Cleyet-Merle	France	4:04.76	
15	Soukaina Hajji	Morocco	4:04.79	PB
16	Samrawit Mulugeta	Ethiopia	4:08.81	
—	Amina Maatoug	Netherlands	DNF	PM

100 Metres Hurdles
Place	Athlete	Nation	Time	Notes
1st place, gold medalist(s)	Tobi Amusan	Nigeria	12.28	MR, =SB
2nd place, silver medalist(s)	Devynne Charlton	Bahamas	12.40	
3rd place, bronze medalist(s)	Nadine Visser	Netherlands	12.47	SB
4	Marione Fourie	South Africa	12.62	SB
5	Kendra Harrison	United States	12.65	
6	Ditaji Kambundji	Switzerland	12.66	
7	Sacha Alessandrini	France	12.70	=PB
8	Alaysha Johnson	United States	12.71	
9	Kerrica Hill	Jamaica	12.71	SB
			Wind: (+1.2 m/s)	

== National events results ==
=== Men's ===
200 Metres
Place	Athlete	Nation	Time	Notes
1st place, gold medalist(s)	Aymane El Haddaoui	Morocco	21.08	
2nd place, silver medalist(s)	Mohamed Lameti	Morocco	21.21	
3rd place, bronze medalist(s)	Adam Fourar	Morocco	21.31	
4	Saad Fatouhi	Morocco	21.59	
5	Said Aberchih	Morocco	21.60	
6	Walid Jabri	Morocco	21.77	
7	Otmane Mahieddine	Morocco	21.84	
8	Mohammed Edraoui	Morocco	21.97	
9	Oussama Khali	Morocco	22.51	
			Wind: (+0.3 m/s)	

400 Metres
Place	Athlete	Nation	Time	Notes
1st place, gold medalist(s)	Ismail Manyani	Morocco	46.03	
2nd place, silver medalist(s)	Walid el Boussiri	Morocco	46.46	
3rd place, bronze medalist(s)	Adnane Sahmoudi	Morocco	46.58	
4	Rachid Mhamdi	Morocco	46.67	
5	Adam Namar	Morocco	46.81	
6	Elmehdi Dimmokrati	Morocco	47.70	
7	Aimrane Bintaoui	Morocco	47.91	
8	Moussa Banour	Morocco	48.05	
9	Lotfi Adam el Meliani	Morocco	48.17	

800 Metres
Place	Athlete	Nation	Time	Notes
1st place, gold medalist(s)	Marouane Ennadi	Morocco	1:47.06	
2nd place, silver medalist(s)	Abdellah Mouzlib	Morocco	1:47.77	
3rd place, bronze medalist(s)	Soufiane Zraidi	Morocco	1:48.81	
4	Faical Agour	Morocco	1:49.13	
5	Hassan ben Hachimi	Morocco	1:49.16	
6	Othmane Elbarkaoui	Morocco	1:49.73	
7	Hassan Bouazaoui	Morocco	1:49.93	
8	Aziz Haiti	Morocco	1:51.03	
9	Rayan Sahraoui	Morocco	1:51.75	
10	Saad Hajjar	Morocco	1:51.91	
11	Hamza el Mandili	Morocco	1:51.94	
12	Youssef el Fassi	Morocco	1:52.35	
13	Mohcine Ouaissa	Morocco	1:52.64	
14	Marouane Khribach	Morocco	1:52.78	
15	Ayoub Moutawaqqil	Morocco	1:52.96	
16	Hicham Tarfaoui	Morocco	1:53.30	
17	Amr Echchab	Morocco	1:53.77	
18	Taha Khachani	Morocco	1:54.62	
—	Oussama Fagrach	Morocco	DNF	

1500 Metres
Place	Athlete	Nation	Time	Notes
1st place, gold medalist(s)	Abdelhafed Ahajri	Morocco	3:40.30	
2nd place, silver medalist(s)	Mohammed Elmoussalit	Morocco	3:40.83	
3rd place, bronze medalist(s)	Ahmed Mantiq	Morocco	3:41.87	
4	Mohammed Ezzaouyah	Morocco	3:43.40	
5	Osama Er Redouani	Morocco	3:43.40	
6	Bilal Raggad	Morocco	3:43.55	
7	Mustapha Beridi	Morocco	3:44.27	
8	Mohammed Amine Edmary	Morocco	3:45.10	
9	Abdelwahed Aachour	Morocco	3:45.68	
10	Abdelhakam Bouhou	Morocco	3:47.42	
11	Hatim Aalil	Morocco	3:48.08	
12	Ayoub Serrakh	Morocco	3:48.19	
13	Mahfoud Bellal	Morocco	3:49.36	
14	Mohammed el Mobaraky	Morocco	3:54.37	
15	Omar Jabrane	Morocco	3:58.40	
—	Hicham Akankam	Morocco	DNF	
—	Mohamed el Talhaoui	Morocco	DNF	
—	Reda Ouazzaouit	Morocco	DNF	

=== Women's ===
200 Metres
Place	Athlete	Nation	Time	Notes
1st place, gold medalist(s)	Sara El-Hachimi	Morocco	23.47	
2nd place, silver medalist(s)	Salma Lehlali	Morocco	23.69	
3rd place, bronze medalist(s)	Houda Nouiri	Morocco	24.01	
4	Kaltoum el Barbouchi	Morocco	24.47	
5	Loubna Housaini	Morocco	24.65	
6	Imane Mefhoul	Morocco	24.78	
7	Halima el Barbouchi	Morocco	25.06	
8	Fatima el Haoukali	Morocco	25.11	
			Wind: (+0.3 m/s)	

800 Metres
Place	Athlete	Nation	Time	Notes
1st place, gold medalist(s)	Lamyae Abbassi	Morocco	2:06.84	
2nd place, silver medalist(s)	Khadija Elmostaqim	Morocco	2:09.89	
3rd place, bronze medalist(s)	Ahlam Barghout	Morocco	2:10.25	
4	Khadija Benkassem	Morocco	2:10.82	
5	Wissal Azzaba	Morocco	2:11.08	
6	Meryem el Barodi	Morocco	2:12.88	
7	Hadda Sabiri	Morocco	2:13.49	
8	Meryem Elmoutacharraf	Morocco	2:13.75	
9	Hasnaa Essadik	Morocco	2:14.95	
10	Rajaa Naoui	Morocco	2:15.16	
11	Maryam Sofi	Morocco	2:16.80	
12	Kawthar el Mhajjar	Morocco	2:17.46	
13	Marwa Ouass	Morocco	2:17.80	
14	Imane el Bouzy	Morocco	2:18.43	

1500 Metres
Place	Athlete	Nation	Time	Notes
1st place, gold medalist(s)	Saida el-Bouzy	Morocco	4:16.23	
2nd place, silver medalist(s)	Fatima Ezzahra Birdaha	Morocco	4:16.90	
3rd place, bronze medalist(s)	Assia Nouri	Morocco	4:19.44	
4	Sara Zouhair	Morocco	4:21.87	
5	Oumaima Chihab	Morocco	4:23.01	
6	Housna Ibnabdel-Matey	Morocco	4:24.34	
7	Ahlam el Kaddouri	Morocco	4:25.05	
8	Chaimae Zahiri	Morocco	4:26.88	
9	Khaddouj el Bali	Morocco	4:28.74	
10	Saida Habib	Morocco	4:31.50	
11	Douae Elalami	Morocco	4:32.58	
12	Salma Kassimi	Morocco	4:33.06	
13	Sara Dahrouch	Morocco	4:36.95	
14	Wissam Elbaldi	Morocco	4:42.86	
—	Asmaa Bassou	Morocco	DNF	
—	Marwa Benchrifa	Morocco	DNF	

== See also ==
- 2026 Diamond League
