= 2024 African Championships in Athletics – Women's 800 metres =

Women's 800 metres at the 2024 African Championships in Athletics
- Venue: Japoma Stadium
- Location: Douala, Cameroon
- Dates: 22 June (heats); 23 June (final)
- Competitors: 17 from 14 nations
- Winning time: 2:00.27

Medalists
gold medal	Sarah Moraa	Kenya
silver medal	Lilian Odira	Kenya
bronze medal	Soukaina Hajji	Morocco

The women's 800 metres event at the 2024 African Championships in Athletics was held on 22 and 23 June in Douala, Cameroon.

== Records ==
Records before the 2024 African Athletics Championships
Record	Athlete (nation)	Time (s)	Location	Date
World record	Jarmila Kratochvílová (TCH)	1:53.28	Munich, West Germany	26 July 1983
African record	Pamela Jelimo (KEN)	1:54.01	Zurich, Switzerland	29 August 2008
Championship record	Caster Semenya (RSA)	1:56.06	Asaba, Nigeria	5 August 2018
World leading	Keely Hodgkinson (GBR)	1:55.78	Eugene, United States	25 May 2024
African leading	Mary Moraa (KEN)	1:56.71	Eugene, United States	25 May 2024

== Results ==
=== Heats ===
Qualification: First 3 of each heat (Q) and the next 2 fastest (q) qualified for the final.

Rank	Heat	Name	Nationality	Time	Notes
1	2	Sarah Moraa	Kenya	2:02.02	Q
2	2	Ksanet Alemu	Ethiopia	2:02.99	Q
3	2	Assia Raziki	Morocco	2:03.15	Q
4	1	Charne Swart	South Africa	2:03.49	Q
5	1	Oratile Nowe	Botswana	2:03.95	Q
6	2	Soukaina Hajji	Morocco	2:04.24	q
7	1	Lilian Odira	Kenya	2:04.43	Q
8	2	Susan Aneno	Uganda	2:04.52	q
9	2	Firezewid Tesfaye	Ethiopia	2:06.16	
10	1	Adanu Nenko	Ethiopia	2:09.53	
11	1	Tuuliki Angala	Namibia	2:10.28	
12	1	Comfort James	Nigeria	2:11.38	qR
13	2	Odette Sawekoua	Benin	2:12.68	
14	1	Dusamane Hassaue	Chad	2:16.63	
15	1	Liliane Nguetsa	Cameroon	2:16.67	
16	2	Belvia Boy-Fini	Central African Republic	2:18.09	
17	1	Chalene Dusaba	Burundi	2:18.38	
	1	Fraida Hassanatte	Chad	DNS	
	2	Vidette Ndayikenburvaye	Burundi	DNS	

=== Final ===
Rank	Athlete	Nationality	Time	Notes
1st place, gold medalist(s)	Sarah Moraa	Kenya	2:00.27	
2nd place, silver medalist(s)	Lilian Odira	Kenya	2:00.36	
3rd place, bronze medalist(s)	Soukaina Hajji	Morocco	2:00.91	
4	Oratile Nowe	Botswana	2:01.39	
5	Assia Raziki	Morocco	2:02.14	
6	Charne Swart	South Africa	2:02.43	
7	Susan Aneno	Uganda	2:02.54	
8	Comfort James	Nigeria	2:04.45	
9	Ksanet Alemu	Ethiopia	2:04.54	

== See also ==
- Athletics at the 2023 African Games – Women's 800 metres
