= Athletics at the 2026 Commonwealth Games – Women's 800 metres =

Women's 800 metres at the 2026 Commonwealth Games
- Venue: Scotstoun Stadium, Glasgow
- Dates: 27 July 2026 (round 1); 29 July 2026 (semi-finals); 31 July 2026 (final)
- Competitors: 32 from 21 nations
- Winning time: 1:59.51

Medalists
gold medal	Georgia Hunter Bell	England
silver medal	Lilian Odira	Kenya
bronze medal	Sarah Billings	Australia

The women's 800 metres at the 2026 Commonwealth Games, as part of the athletics programme, will take place at the Scotstoun Stadium from 27 to 31 July 2026.

== Records ==
Prior to this competition, the existing world, Commonwealth and Commonwealth Games records were as follows:

Women's 800 Metres
World record	1:53.28	Jarmila Kratochvílová (TCH)	München, West Germany	26 Jul 1983
Commonwealth record	1:54.01	Pamela Jelimo (KEN)	Zürich, Switzerland	29 Aug 2008
Games record	1:56.70	Caster Semenya (RSA)	Gold Coast, Australia	13 April 2018

== Schedule ==
The schedule is as follows:

Date	Time	Round
27 July 2026	18:30	Round 1
29 July 2026	18:30	Semifinals
31 July 2026	18:30	Final

All times are United Kingdom time (UTC+1)

== Results ==
=== Round 1 ===
Round 1 took place on the evening of 27 July 2026. First 3 in each heat (Q) and the next 4 fastest (q) advance to the semi-finals.

==== Heat 1 ====
Place	Athlete	Nation	Time	Notes
1	Sarah Billings	Australia	2:01.51	Q
2	Oratile Nowe	Botswana	2:02.11	Q
3	Janet Jepkemoi Amimo	Kenya	2:02.30	Q
4	Adelle Tracey	Jamaica	2:02.58	q
5	Manqabang Tsibela	Lesotho	2:03.64	q
6	Aaliyah Moore	Guyana	2:05.54	
7	Fasuhaa Ahmed	Maldives	2:19.86	SB
8	Jane Kargbo	Sierra Leone	2:20.43	SB

==== Heat 2 ====
Place	Athlete	Nation	Time	Notes
1	Lilian Odira	Kenya	2:01.05	Q
2	Isabelle Boffey	Wales	2:01.53	Q
3	Kelly-Ann Beckford	Jamaica	2:01.63	Q
4	Maeliss Trapeau	Canada	2:03.89	q
5	Mena Scatchard	Scotland	2:03.94	
6	Claire Uwitonze	Rwanda	2:06.95	SB
7	Scholastica Herman	Papua New Guinea	2:19.20	

==== Heat 3 ====
Place	Athlete	Nation	Time	Notes
1	Georgia Hunter Bell	England	2:02.61	Q
2	Jemma Reekie	Scotland	2:03.09	Q
3	Halimah Nakaayi	Uganda	2:04.33	Q
4	Nicole McKenzie	Canada	2:05.07	
5	Abigail Abugire	Ghana	2:06.31	
6	Adi Ceva Sova Lutumailagi	Fiji	2:22.58	
7	Tanesia Sylvina Gardiner	Turks and Caicos Islands	2:24.28	

==== Heat 4 ====
Place	Athlete	Nation	Time	Notes
1	Shafiqua Maloney	Saint Vincent and the Grenadines	2:02.83	Q
2	Rachel Klopfenstein	Mauritius	2:03.04	Q
3	Erin Wallace	Scotland	2:03.15	Q
4	Prudence Sekgodiso	South Africa	2:03.84	q
5	Honorine Iribagiza	Rwanda	2:05.36	PB
6	Vivian Chebet Kiprotich	Kenya	2:13.00	
—	Mary Kamara	Sierra Leone	DQ	TR17.2.3
—	Glandness Simpson	Fiji	DQ	TR17.2.3

=== Semi-finals ===
The semi-finals took place on the evening of 29 July 2026. First 3 in each heat (Q) and the next 2 fastest (q) advance to the Final.

==== Heat 1 ====
Place	Athlete	Nation	Time	Notes
1	Lilian Odira	Kenya	1:59.39	Q
2	Shafiqua Maloney	Saint Vincent and the Grenadines	1:59.81	Q
3	Kelly-Ann Beckford	Jamaica	1:59.96	Q
4	Isabelle Boffey	Wales	2:00.24	q
5	Rachel Klopfenstein	Mauritius	2:00.48	q
6	Erin Wallace	Scotland	2:00.76	
7	Prudence Sekgodiso	South Africa	2:01.57	
8	Maeliss Trapeau	Canada	2:02.42	

==== Heat 2 ====
Place	Athlete	Nation	Time	Notes
1	Georgia Hunter Bell	England	1:59.88	Q
2	Sarah Billings	Australia	2:00.05	Q
3	Oratile Nowe	Botswana	2:00.60	Q
4	Adelle Tracey	Jamaica	2:01.54	
5	Janet Jepkemoi	Kenya	2:02.08	
6	Halimah Nakaayi	Uganda	2:03.36	
7	Jemma Reekie	Scotland	2:03.46	
8	Manqabang Tsibela	Lesotho	2:03.93	

=== Final ===
The final of the women's 800 metres took place on the evening of 31 July 2026.

Place	Lane	Athlete	Nation	Time	Notes
1st place, gold medalist(s)	5	Georgia Hunter Bell	England	1:59.51	
2nd place, silver medalist(s)	7	Lilian Odira	Kenya	2:00.58	
3rd place, bronze medalist(s)	4	Sarah Billings	Australia	2:00.61	
4	6	Oratile Nowe	Botswana	2:01.29	
5	8	Isabelle Boffey	Wales	2:01.44	
6	3	Shafiqua Maloney	Saint Vincent and the Grenadines	2:02.17	
7	2	Kelly-Ann Beckford	Jamaica	2:02.77	
8	1	Rachel Klopfenstein	Mauritius	2:03.81	
