= 2026 Xiamen Diamond League =

Athletics meeting in Xiamen, China

- Dates: 23 May 2026
- Host city: Xiamen, China
- Venue: Xiamen Egret Stadium
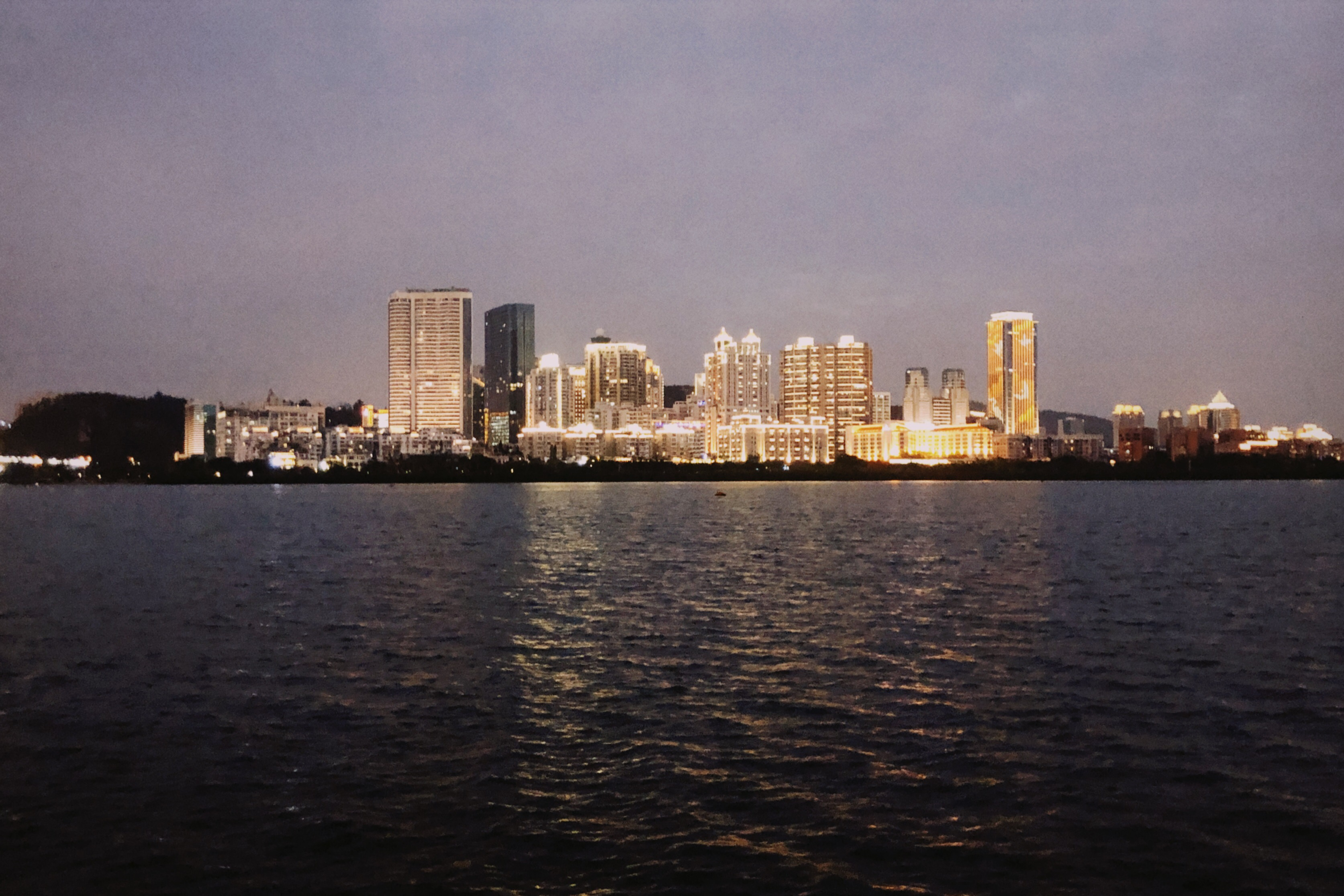
- Level: 2026 Diamond League

The 2026 Xiamen Diamond League was an outdoor track and field meeting in Xiamen, China. Held on 23 May 2026 at Xiamen Egret Stadium, it was the second leg of the 2026 Diamond League – the highest level international track and field circuit.

== Diamond+ events results ==
=== Men's ===
400 Metres
Place	Athlete	Nation	Time	Points	Notes
1st place, gold medalist(s)	Collen Kebinatshipi	Botswana	43.92	8	MR, WL
2nd place, silver medalist(s)	Muzala Samukonga	Zambia	44.04	7	SB
3rd place, bronze medalist(s)	Zakithi Nene	South Africa	44.40	6	SB
4	Christopher Bailey	United States	44.70	5	
5	Bayapo Ndori	Botswana	44.88	4	
6	Christopher Morales Williams	Canada	45.24	3	
7	Attila Molnár	Hungary	45.49	2	
8	Vernon Norwood	United States	45.51	1	
9	Liu Kai	China	46.60		

110 Metres hurdles
Place	Athlete	Nation	Time	Points	Notes
1st place, gold medalist(s)	Jamal Britt	United States	13.07	8	=PB
2nd place, silver medalist(s)	Rachid Muratake	Japan	13.13	7	
3rd place, bronze medalist(s)	Orlando Bennett	Jamaica	13.20	6	=SB
4	Jason Joseph	Switzerland	13.24	5	SB
5	Cordell Tinch	United States	13.28	4	
6	Xu Zhuoyi	China	13.33	3	SB
7	Liu Junxi	China	13.35	2	
8	Enrique Llopis	Spain	13.36	1	SB
9	Eric Edwards Jr.	United States	13.43		
10	Enzo Diessl	Austria	13.44		SB
			Wind: (+0.5 m/s)		

Long jump
Place	Athlete	Nation	Distance	Points	Notes
1st place, gold medalist(s)	Miltiadis Tentoglou	Greece	8.46 m Wind: (±0.0 m/s)	8	MR, WL
2nd place, silver medalist(s)	Tajay Gayle	Jamaica	8.32 m Wind: (+0.2 m/s)	7	SB
3rd place, bronze medalist(s)	Bozhidar Sarâboyukov	Bulgaria	8.29 m Wind: (+0.1 m/s)	6	
4	Mattia Furlani	Italy	8.28 m Wind: (+0.1 m/s)	5	
5	Anvar Anvarov	Uzbekistan	8.01 m Wind: (−0.4 m/s)	4	
6	Wayne Pinnock	Jamaica	7.93 m Wind: (+0.5 m/s)	3	=SB
7	Shu Heng	China	7.84 m Wind: (+0.4 m/s)	2	SB
8	Liam Adcock	Australia	7.76 m Wind: (+0.8 m/s)	1	
9	Shi Yuhao	China	7.70 m Wind: (+0.2 m/s)		
10	Zhang Mingkun	China	7.66 m Wind: (±0.0 m/s)		

Shot put
Place	Athlete	Nation	Height	Points	Notes
1st place, gold medalist(s)	Rajindra Campbell	Jamaica	22.34 m	8	NR
2nd place, silver medalist(s)	Jordan Geist	United States	21.52 m	7	
3rd place, bronze medalist(s)	Ryan Crouser	United States	21.41 m	6	SB
4	Roger Steen	United States	21.25 m	5	
5	Chukwuebuka Enekwechi	Nigeria	21.14 m	4	
6	Tom Walsh	New Zealand	21.13 m	3	
7	Adrian Piperi	United States	20.57 m	2	SB
8	Uziel Muñoz	Mexico	20.28 m	1	
9	Xing Jialiang	China	19.75 m		
—	Leonardo Fabbri	Italy	NM		

=== Women's ===
200 Metres
Place	Athlete	Nation	Time	Points	Notes
1st place, gold medalist(s)	Shericka Jackson	Jamaica	21.87	8	MR, SB
2nd place, silver medalist(s)	Shaunae Miller-Uibo	Bahamas	22.04	7	SB
3rd place, bronze medalist(s)	Anavia Battle	United States	22.29	6	SB
4	Sha'Carri Richardson	United States	22.38	5	SB
5	Jenna Prandini	United States	22.46	4	
6	McKenzie Long	United States	22.63	3	
7	Amy Hunt	Great Britain	22.67	2	
8	Chen Yujie	China	23.01	1	
9	Torrie Lewis	Australia	23.25		
			Wind: (+0.2 m/s)		

100 Metres hurdles
Place	Athlete	Nation	Time	Points	Notes
1st place, gold medalist(s)	Masai Russell	United States	12.14	8	AR, DLR, WL
2nd place, silver medalist(s)	Tobi Amusan	Nigeria	12.28	7	SB
3rd place, bronze medalist(s)	Devynne Charlton	Bahamas	12.37	6	NR
4	Megan Simmonds	Jamaica	12.52	5	SB
5	Ditaji Kambundji	Switzerland	12.62	4	SB
6	Ackera Nugent	Jamaica	12.64	3	SB
7	Danielle Williams	Jamaica	12.90	2	SB
8	Wu Yanni	China	13.06	1	SB
9	Tonea Marshall	United States	13.13		
10	Liu Jingyang	China	13.26		SB
			Wind: (+0.5 m/s)		

High jump
Place	Athlete	Nation	Height	Points	Notes
1st place, gold medalist(s)	Yuliya Levchenko	Ukraine	1.99 m	8	=SB
2nd place, silver medalist(s)	Iryna Herashchenko	Ukraine	1.97 m	7	SB
3rd place, bronze medalist(s)	Lamara Distin	Jamaica	1.94 m	6	
4	Maria Żodzik	Poland	1.94 m	5	
5	Eleanor Patterson	Australia	1.94 m	4	
6	Charity Hufnagel	United States	1.91 m	3	
7	Lu Jiawen	China	1.88 m	2	
8	Morgan Lake	Great Britain	1.88 m	1	
9	Imke Onnen	Germany	1.88 m		
10	Shao Yuqi	China	1.84 m		=SB

Discus throw
Place	Athlete	Nation	Distance	Points	Notes
1st place, gold medalist(s)	Valarie Sion	United States	68.45 m	8	
2nd place, silver medalist(s)	Feng Bin	China	65.03 m	7	SB
3rd place, bronze medalist(s)	Jorinde van Klinken	Netherlands	64.27 m	6	
4	Erika Beistle	United States	64.07 m	5	
5	Vanessa Kamga	Sweden	64.02 m	4	SB
6	Shanice Craft	Germany	63.96 m	3	
7	Cierra Jackson	United States	62.66 m	2	
8	Laulauga Tausaga	United States	61.51 m	1	
9	Veronica Fraley	United States	61.27 m		
10	Silinda Morales	Cuba	59.07 m		

== Diamond events results ==
=== Men's ===
100 Metres
Place	Athlete	Nation	Time	Points	Notes
1st place, gold medalist(s)	Ferdinand Omanyala	Kenya	9.94	8	SB
2nd place, silver medalist(s)	Gift Leotlela	South Africa	10.00	7	
3rd place, bronze medalist(s)	Trayvon Bromell	United States	10.03	6	
4	Kenny Bednarek	United States	10.03	5	
5	Akani Simbine	South Africa	10.04	4	
6	Lachlan Kennedy	Australia	10.06	3	
7	Christian Coleman	United States	10.08	2	SB
8	Letsile Tebogo	Botswana	10.10	1	SB
9	Deng Xinrui	China	10.27		
10	Wang Shengjie	China	10.33		
			Wind: (+0.2 m/s)		

5000 Metres
Place	Athlete	Nation	Time	Points	Notes
1st place, gold medalist(s)	Addisu Yihune	Ethiopia	12:57.32	8	MR, WL
2nd place, silver medalist(s)	Mohamed Abdilaahi	Germany	12:57.90	7	SB
3rd place, bronze medalist(s)	Biniam Mehary	Ethiopia	12:58.51	6	SB
4	Eduardo Herrera	Mexico	13:00.69	5	SB
5	Edwin Kurgat	Kenya	13:01.47	4	SB
6	Khairi Bejiga	Ethiopia	13:06.45	3	PB
7	Birhanu Balew	Bahrain	13:07.75	2	SB
8	Cornelius Kemboi	Kenya	13:08.45	1	SB
9	Santiago Catrofe	Uruguay	13:08.72		SB
10	Keneth Kiprop	Uganda	13:08.79		SB
11	Mathew Kipsang	Kenya	13:12.82		SB
12	Mezgebu Sime	Ethiopia	13:13.17		SB
13	Timothy Cheruiyot	Kenya	13:16.41		PB
14	Seth O'Donnell	Australia	13:18.68		
15	Harbert Kibet	Uganda	13:46.45		SB
16	Tim Verbaandert	Netherlands	13:54.63		SB
—	Andreas Almgren	Sweden	DNF		
—	Abdisa Fayisa	Ethiopia	DNF		
—	Kuma Girma	Ethiopia	DNF		
—	Boaz Kiprugut	Kenya	DNF		PM
—	Filip Sasínek	Czech Republic	DNF		PM

400 Metres hurdles
Place	Athlete	Nation	Time	Points	Notes
1st place, gold medalist(s)	Alison dos Santos	Brazil	46.72	8	WL
2nd place, silver medalist(s)	Karsten Warholm	Norway	46.82	7	SB
3rd place, bronze medalist(s)	Caleb Dean	United States	47.75	6	SB
4	Trevor Bassitt	United States	47.90	5	
5	Abderrahman Samba	Qatar	47.93	4	SB
6	Matheus Lima	Brazil	48.22	3	SB
7	CJ Allen	United States	49.18	2	
8	Gong Debin	China	50.14	1	SB
9	Kyron McMaster	British Virgin Islands	52.41		SB

=== Women's ===
1500 Metres
Place	Athlete	Nation	Time	Points	Notes
1st place, gold medalist(s)	Abbey Caldwell	Australia	3:57.26	8	
2nd place, silver medalist(s)	Birke Haylom	Ethiopia	3:57.79	7	
3rd place, bronze medalist(s)	Emily Mackay	United States	3:58.13	6	SB
4	Dorcus Ewoi	Kenya	3:58.91	5	
5	Jessica Hull	Australia	3:58.97	4	
6	Saron Berhe	Ethiopia	4:00.32	3	SB
7	Gabija Galvydytė	Lithuania	4:00.41	2	
8	Linden Hall	Australia	4:00.55	1	
9	Revée Walcott-Nolan	Great Britain	4:00.78		SB
10	Joceline Wind	Switzerland	4:01.41		PB
11	Sarah Billings	Australia	4:02.00		
12	Gracie Morris	United States	4:02.14		
13	Claudia Hollingsworth	Australia	4:06.46		
14	Li Chunhui	China	4:07.43		SB
15	Worknesh Mesele	Ethiopia	4:07.53		
—	Taryn Parks	United States	DNF		

3000 Metres steeplechase
Place	Athlete	Nation	Time	Points	Notes
1st place, gold medalist(s)	Peruth Chemutai	Uganda	8:51.06	8	MR, WL
2nd place, silver medalist(s)	Winfred Yavi	Bahrain	8:51.54	7	SB
3rd place, bronze medalist(s)	Faith Cherotich	Kenya	8:52.53	6	
4	Marwa Bouzayani	Tunisia	8:59.25	5	
5	Kena Tufa	Ethiopia	9:11.36	4	
6	Norah Jeruto	Kazakhstan	9:13.86	3	
7	Lexy Halladay-Lowry	United States	9:14.96	2	
8	Alemnat Walle	Ethiopia	9:15.79	1	
9	Frehiwot Gesese	Ethiopia	9:16.83		PB
10	Kaylee Mitchell	United States	9:24.54		
11	Adva Cohen	Israel	9:28.81		SB
12	Cara Feain-Ryan	Australia	9:29.10		
13	Courtney Wayment	United States	9:29.51		
14	Angelina Ellis	United States	9:29.97		
15	Olivia Gürth	Germany	9:35.82		SB
16	Olivia Markezich	United States	9:38.79		
17	Luo Xia	China	9:49.83		
—	Veerle Bakker	Netherlands	DNF		PM

Javelin throw
Place	Athlete	Nation	Distance	Points	Notes
1st place, gold medalist(s)	Yan Ziyi	China	71.74 m	8	WU20R, AR, DLR, WL
2nd place, silver medalist(s)	Sigrid Borge	Norway	65.00 m	7	
3rd place, bronze medalist(s)	Adriana Vilagoš	Serbia	63.64 m	6	
4	Maria Andrejczyk	Poland	62.51 m	5	
5	Flor Ruiz	Colombia	60.84 m	4	
6	Tori Peeters	New Zealand	60.37 m	3	
7	Haruka Kitaguchi	Japan	60.08 m	2	
8	Dai Qianqian	China	59.20 m	1	
9	Małgorzata Maślak-Glugla	Poland	58.59 m		
10	Elina Tzengko	Greece	55.96 m		

== National events results ==
=== Men's ===
100 Metres
Place	Athlete	Nation	Time	Notes
1st place, gold medalist(s)	Xiangrui Li	China	10.72	
2nd place, silver medalist(s)	Juncheng Liu	China	10.74	
3rd place, bronze medalist(s)	Shuo Yuan	China	10.76	
4	Guanzong Huang	China	10.80	
5	Xianming Jiang	China	10.87	
6	Jie Chen	China	11.04	
7	Yongkang Ou	China	11.08	
8	Dongwei Ge	China	11.20	
9	Peilong Chen	China	11.59	
10	Yuchen Cai	China	11.80	
			Wind: (−0.4 m/s)	

=== Women's ===
100 Metres
Place	Athlete	Nation	Time	Notes
1st place, gold medalist(s)	Zhixuan Xiao	China	11.94	
2nd place, silver medalist(s)	Yuxuan Sun	China	12.60	
3rd place, bronze medalist(s)	Kexin Lin	China	12.63	
4	Shixuan Wu	China	12.70	
5	Peiyu Chen	China	12.74	
6	Mengxi Li	China	12.76	
7	Chengxue Yu	China	12.80	
8	Tiantian Ding	China	12.88	
9	Shiyu Wu	China	12.89	
10	Mingyi Yu	China	13.56	
			Wind: (−0.5 m/s)	

== See also ==
- 2026 Diamond League
