= Simone Plourde =

Canadian middle-distance runner (born 2000)

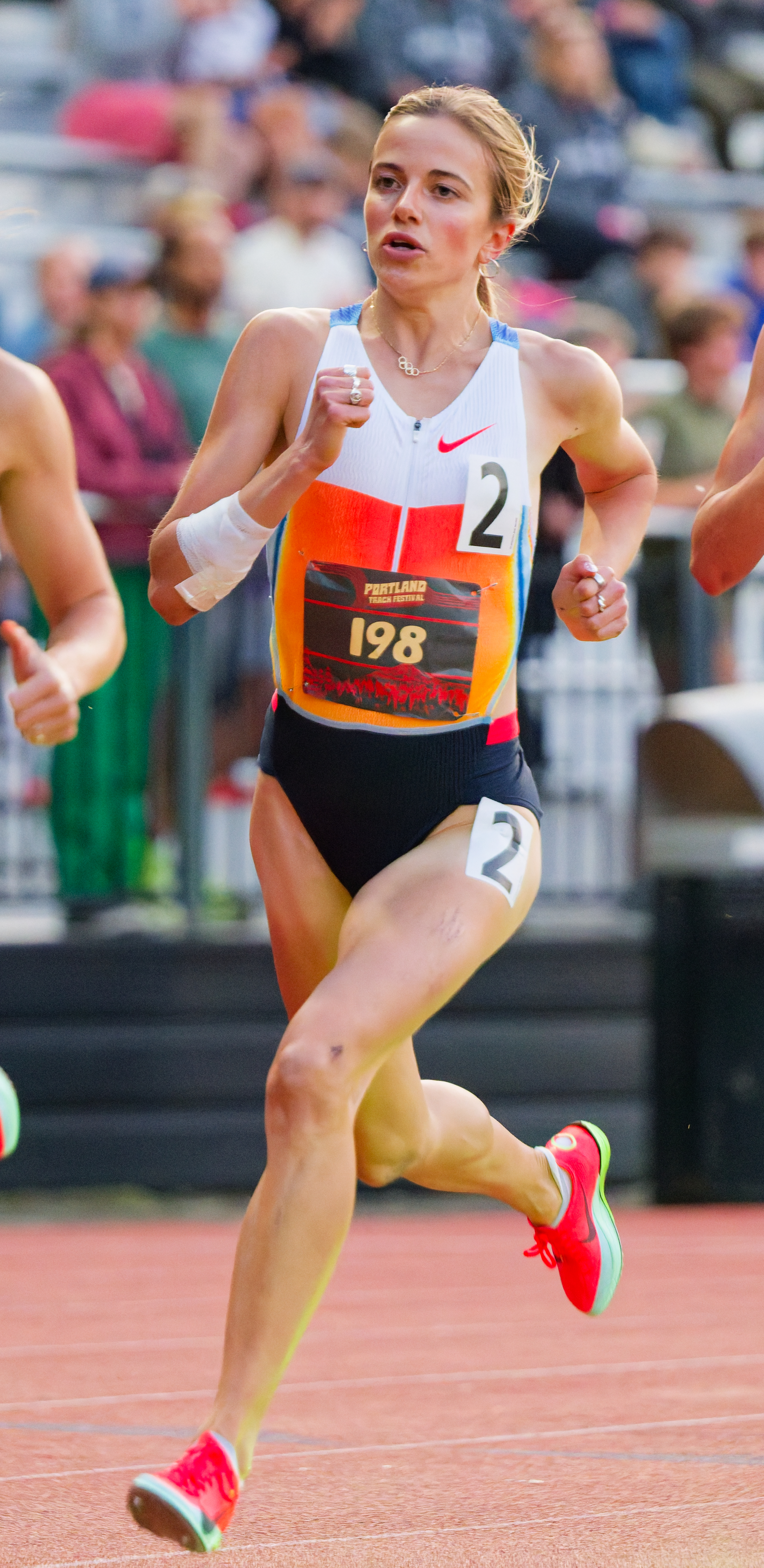
- Plourde in 2025

Personal information
- Born: 8 July 2000 (age 26) Montreal, Quebec, Canada
- Education: University of Utah
- Employer: Nike
- Height: 5 ft 5 in (165 cm)

Sport
- Sport: Athletics
- Event: Middle distance running
- University team: Utah Utes (2021-23); BYU Cougars (2020-21)
- Club: Nike Swoosh Track Club
- Coached by: Diljeet Taylor

Achievements and titles
- Personal bests: 800 m: 2:00.94 (Los Angeles 2025); 1500 m: 4:02.91 (Los Angeles 2025); Mile: 4:22.41 (Boston 2025); 3000 m: 8:53.95 (Seattle 2023); 5000 m: 15:01.21 (Boston 2025)

Simone Plourde (born 8 July 2000) is a Canadian middle distance runner who competes in the 1500 m. From 2021 to 2023, she competed for the Utah Utes, before signing professionally with Nike and joining the Union Athletics Club in 2023. She also represented Canada at the 2023 World Athletics Championships in Budapest, Hungary.

== Early life ==
Born and raised in Montreal, Quebec, Plourde's initial main sporting interests were in skiing and soccer. She started to train seriously in athletics in 2018.

Plourde attended secondary school at Pensionnat Saint-Nom-de-Marie and CEGEP at Collège André-Grasset, before enrolling at Brigham Young University in fall 2020. Citing difficulties with fitting into BYU's primarily Mormon population, she before transferred to the University of Utah in 2021.

== Athletics career ==
=== Collegiate ===
Competing for the University of Utah, Plourde won the 1500 m at the Pac-12 Championships in May 2023, breaking Shelby Houlihan’s conference record by close to two seconds. In the 5000 m, she placed seventh at the 2023 NCAA Championships in Austin, Texas in June.

=== Professional ===
On June 29, 2023, She set a Quebec provincial record as she ran a personal best over 1500m at La Classique d’athlétisme de Montréal. She turned professional in July 2023, joining the Nike Union Athletics Club based in Portland, Oregon. Making her Union Athletics Club debut at the Harry Jerome Classic, she set another personal best and Quebec record of 4:06.47 She finished second in the 1500 m at the Canadian Track and Field Championships in July 2023. She was selected for the 2023 World Athletics Championships in Budapest in August 2023 where she finished tenth in her heat.

In February 2024, she ran a huge personal best in the Wanamaker Mile at the Millrose Games in New York, recording 4:24.67, an improvement of more than 17 seconds. This placed her third all-time among Canadian women, behind only Gabriela DeBues-Stafford and her sister, Lucia Stafford. She was selected for the 2024 World Athletics Indoor Championships in Glasgow as part of the Canadian team, to compete in the 1500 metres, where she was eliminated in the heats. She competed in the 1500 metres at the 2024 Summer Olympics in Paris in August 2024.

She was selected for the 2025 World Athletics Indoor Championships in Nanjing in March 2025.

Plourde was a finalist in the mile at the 2026 Commonwealth Games in Glasgow, Scotland.
