= Athletics at the 2026 Commonwealth Games – Women's mile =

Women's Mile at the 2026 Commonwealth Games
- Venue: Scotstoun Stadium, Glasgow
- Dates: 30 July (round 1); 1 August (final)
- Winning time: 4:39.31

Medalists
gold medal	Abbey Caldwell	Australia
silver medal	Jessica Hull	Australia
bronze medal	Claudia Hollingsworth	Australia

The women's mile at the 2026 Commonwealth Games, as part of the athletics programme, took place at the Scotstoun Stadium from 30 July to 1 August 2026. The women's mile comes to the programme for the first time.

== Records ==
Prior to this competition, the existing world and Commonwealth record for the mile is as follows:

Women's Mile run
World record	4:07.60	Faith Kipyegon (KEN)	Stade Louis II, Monaco	21 Jul 2023
Commonwealth record	4:07.60	Faith Kipyegon (KEN)	Stade Louis II, Monaco	21 Jul 2023
Games record				

== Schedule ==
The schedule is as follows:

Date	Time	Round
30 July 2026	12:05	Round 1
1 August 2026	21:45	Final

All times are United Kingdom time (UTC+1)

== Results ==
=== Round 1 ===
Round 1 took place on the morning of 30 July 2026. First 6 in each heat (Q) advance to the final.

==== Heat 1 ====
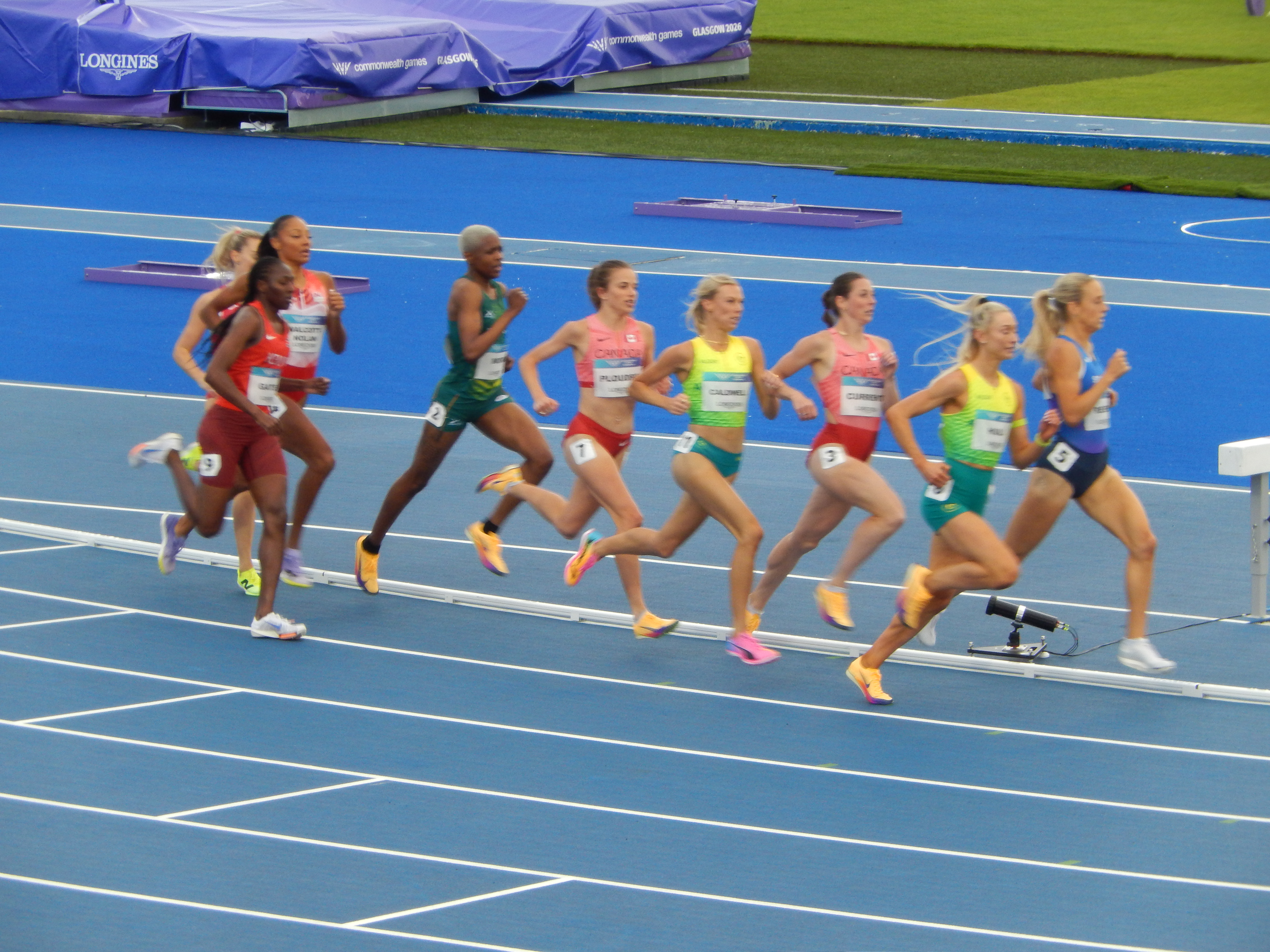
First heat

Place	Athlete	Nation	Time	Notes
1	Teresiah Muthoni Gateri	Kenya	4:33.11	Q, SB
2	Jessica Hull	Australia	4:34.20	Q
3	Abbey Caldwell	Australia	4:34.87	Q, SB
4	Jemma Reekie	Scotland	4:35.15	Q, SB
5	Karabo More	South Africa	4:37.97	Q, SB
6	Simone Plourde	Canada	4:38.50	Q, SB
7	Melissa Courtney-Bryant	Wales	4:39.50	SB
8	Kate Current	Canada	4:39.66	
9	Revee Walcott-Nolan	England	4:44.93	SB
10	Maureen Chebet	Uganda	5:09.81	SB
11	Jane Kargbo	Sierra Leone	5:22.20	SB

==== Heat 2 ====
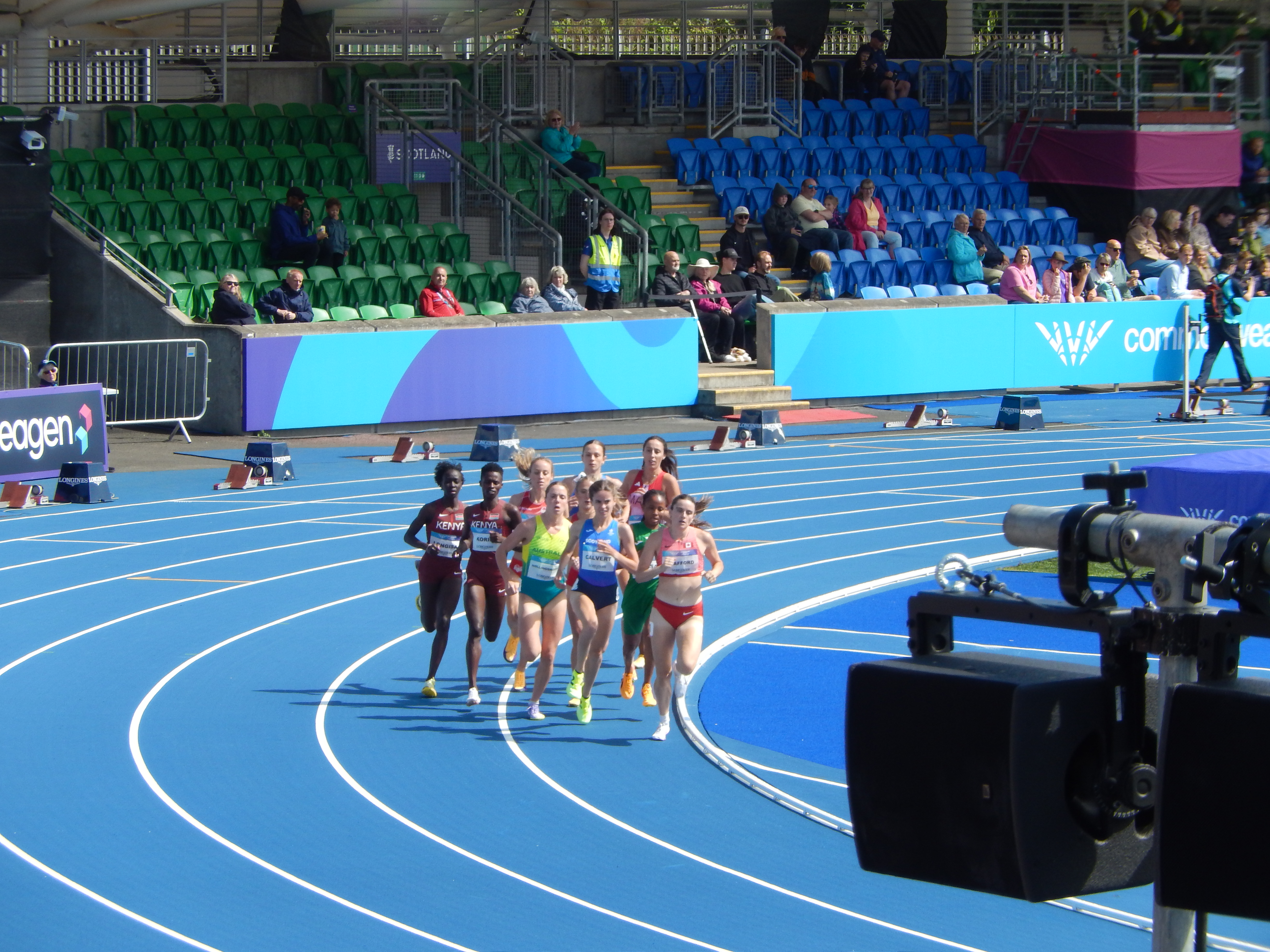
Second heat

Place	Athlete	Nation	Time	Notes
1	Claudia Hollingsworth	Australia	4:31.17	Q, PB
2	Lucia Stafford	Canada	4:31.27	Q, SB
3	Ava Lloyd	Wales	4:31.41	Q, PB
4	Naomi Korir	Kenya	4:31.80	Q, SB
5	Rosemary Longisa	Kenya	4:32.02	Q
6	Sarah Calvert	Scotland	4:32.04	Q, SB
7	Erin Wallace	Scotland	4:32.08	SB
8	Katie Snowden	England	4:33.46	
9	Manqabang Tsibela	Lesotho	4:45.44	SB
10	Gina McNamara	Malta	4:48.33	
11	Hamida Mussa	Tanzania	5:01.34	SB
12	Scholastica Herman	Papua New Guinea	5:14.08	

=== Final ===
The final of the first women's Commonwealth Mile is scheduled for the evening of 1 August 2026.

Place	Athlete	Nation	Time	Notes
1st place, gold medalist(s)	Abbey Caldwell	Australia	4:39.31	
2nd place, silver medalist(s)	Jessica Hull	Australia	4:39.86	
3rd place, bronze medalist(s)	Claudia Hollingsworth	Australia	4:40.20	
4	Lucia Stafford	Canada	4:40.46	
5	Naomi Korir	Kenya	4:40.62	
6	Ava Lloyd	Wales	4:40.73	
7	Sarah Calvert	Scotland	4:40.90	
8	Teresiah Muthoni Gateri	Kenya	4:40.93	
9	Rosemary Longisa	Kenya	4:42.75	
10	Jemma Reekie	Scotland	4:42.93	
11	Simone Plourde	Canada	4:46.45	
12	Karabo More	South Africa	4:50.96	
