= Sophia Gorriaran =

American athlete (born 2005)

Personal information
- Born: 20 June 2005 (age 21)

Sport
- Sport: Athletics
- Event: Middle distance running
- University team: Harvard Crimson
Medal record
Women's athletics
Representing United States
World U20 Championships
Bronze medal – third place	2024 Lima	800 m
Pan American U20 Championships
Gold medal – first place	2023 Mayagüez	800 m

Sophia Gorriaran (born 20 June 2005) is an American middle distance runner.

== Career ==
Running the 800 metres in 2:00.58 on 11 February 2022 at the BU David Hemery Valentine Invitational in Boston, Massachusetts, Gorriaran set a new world U18 best time. She ran a 600m time of 1:25.22 on 30 April 2022 at the Penn Relays in Philadelphia, United States to set a world under-20 record.

She won the gold medal in the 800 metres at the 2023 Pan American U20 Athletics Championships in Puerto Rico.

Running for Harvard University she was part of a distance medley relay including Maia Ramsden and Victoria Bossong, that ran 10:37.55 at the Penn Relays which set a US college record on April 26, 2024. In June 2024, she reached the final of the NCAA Championships and won the USATF U20 Championships in Eugene, Oregon over 800 metres. She won the bronze medal in the 800 metres at the 2024 Word Athletics U20 Championships in Lima, Peru in August 2024.

Gorriaran was a finalist in the 800 metres at the 2025 NCAA Indoor Championships in Virginia Beach on 15 March. She also placed third overall with the women’s 4 x 400 metres relay at the championships in 3:30.49.

Competing for Harvard, Gorriaran moved to third on the NCAA all-time list for the 1000 metres with 2:38.75 at the BU Terrier Classic in Boston on 30 January 2026. The following month, Gorriaran set a new 1000 metres NCAA record of 2:37.72 in Boston. She was a finalist over 800 metres at the 2026 NCAA Division I Indoor Track and Field Championships.

== Personal life ==
She is from Providence, Rhode Island, where she attended Moses Brown School. She was trained by her father Steve, formerly a wide receiver at Brown University. Her mother Carine was her doctor, and she would train with her siblings Natasha and Max, who themselves became college athletes. Her grandfather Manuel Gorriaran was a wrestler who emigrated to the United States from Cuba.
