= Erika Beistle =

American discus thrower (born 2003)

Personal information
- Born: 8 May 2003 (age 23)

Sport
- Sport: Athletics
- Event: Discus throw

Achievements and titles
- Personal bests: Discus: 66.72m (2026); Shot Put: 18.26m (2026)

Erika Beistle (born 8 May 2003) is an American discus thrower and shot putter.

== Biography ==
From Rodney, Michigan, she attended Big Rapids High School, and did not start in the discus throw until joining the track and field team in high school. In her senior year, she was state champion in both the discus throw and shot put. After considering the military she instead began to attend Grand Valley State University and worked with throws coach Matt Conly. In her freshman year, she was runner-up at the D2 NCAA Div II Outdoor Championships.

She was an US Olympic Trials finalist in the discus throw in June 2024, placing fourth overall with a best throw of 62.50 metres. While a student at Grand Valley State University, Beistle won the NCAA Division II title in the discus throw in 2024 and 2025, setting a new meeting record in 2025 with a winning throw of 65.05 meters. In April 2025, she threw 66.63 meters, a new NCAA D2 record. In August 2025, she placed seventh at the 2025 USA Championships.

Competing indoors in 2026, she broke the Grand Valley State record in the shot put, also breaking the NCAA Division II record with a throw of 17.68 meters. In February 2026, Beistle set a new personal best of 18.26 metres in the shot put at the GVSU Big Meet in Allendale, Michigan, winning ahead of compatriot Adelaide Aquilla. On 10 May 2026, Beistle set a new personal best of 66.72 metres at the GVSU Last Day Meet in Allendale, winning ahead of Julia Tunks of Canada. She placed fourth in the discus throw at the 2026 Xiamen Diamond League meeting on 23 May 2026, with a throw of 64.07 metres. With 61.32 metres she placed fifth in July at the 2026 Prefontaine Classic. Competing at the 2026 USA Outdoor Track and Field Championships in New York on 26 July, she finished third in the discus behind Cierra Jackson and defending champion Valarie Sion with 65.29 metres.

== Personal life ==
She typically competes in sunglasses, which she has described as her "little shield, so that nobody can kind of see what’s going on in my head.” Outside of track and field, she is keen on fishing.
