= Msgana Hailu =

Ethiopian runner (born 2005)

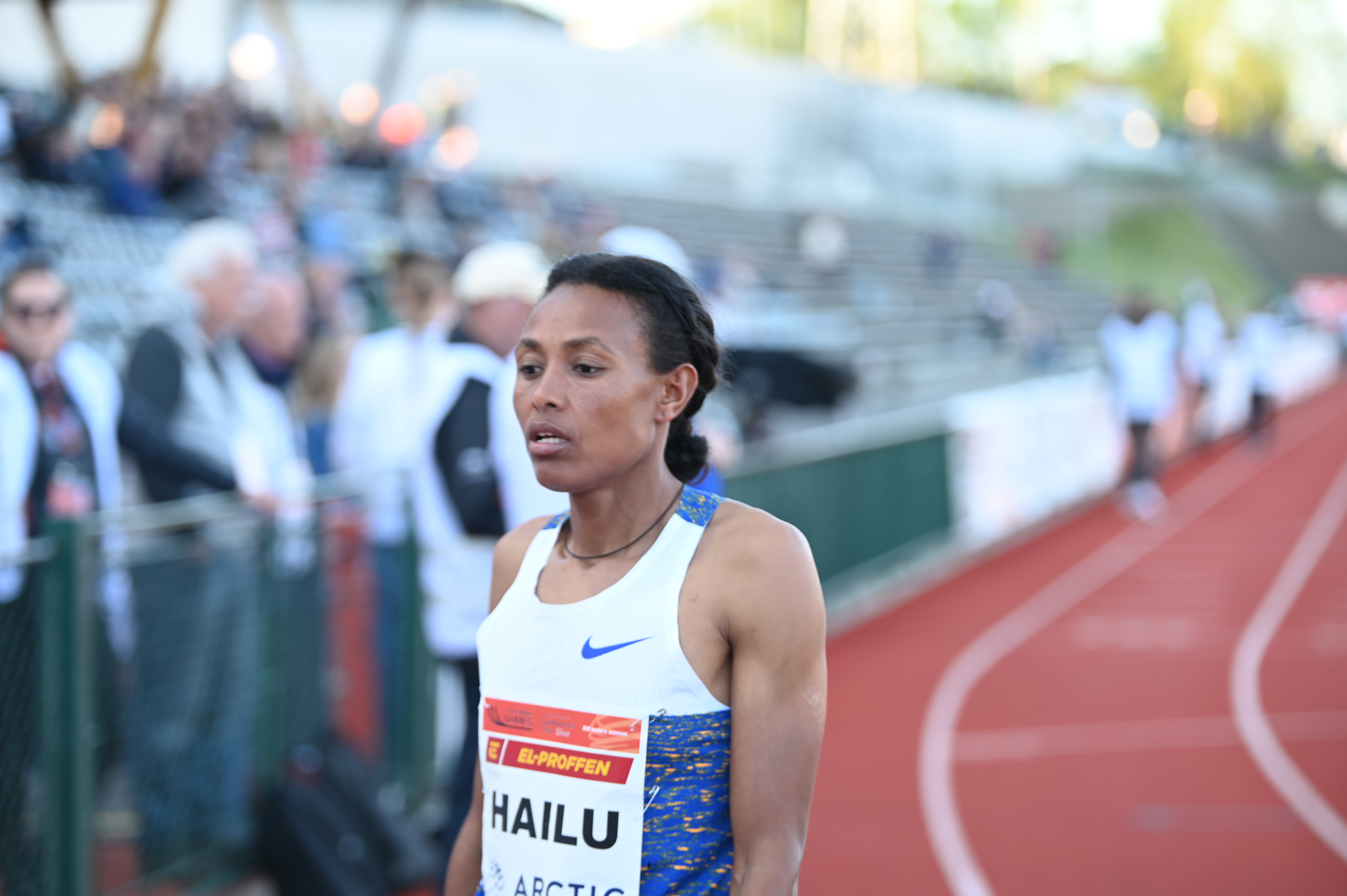
- Hailu at the 2026 Trond Mohn Games

Personal information
- Full name: Msgana Zemedkun Hailu
- Born: 22 December 2005 (age 20)

Sport
- Sport: Athletics
- Event: Middle-distance

Achievements and titles
- Personal best: 800m: 1:59.02 (2026)
Medal record
Women's athletics
Representing Ethiopia
African Championships
Gold medal – first place	2026 Accra	800 m

Msgana Zemedkun Hailu (born 22 December 2005) is an Ethiopian middle-distance runner. She won the Ethiopian championships over 800 metres in 2026 and won the gold medal in the 800 metres at the 2026 African Championships in Athletics.

== Biography ==
In March 2026, Hailu won the 800 metres title at the Ethiopian Athletics Championships, running a time of 2:01.22 in Addis Ababa. She was runner-up to Nigist Getachew over 800 metres the following month at the Abbis Abada Grand Prix, on the World Athletics Continental Tour. In May, she won the gold medal in the 800 metres at the 2026 African Championships in Athletics in Accra, Ghana, in 1:59.02, winning ahead of Botswana's national record-holder Oratile Nowe. In June, she ran 2:02.64 to win over 800 metres at the Josef Odložil Memorial in Prague. On her debut in the 2026 Diamond League on 19 June 2026, she had a top-ten finish in 2:01.47 for the 800 metres at the 2026 Doha Diamond League.
