= Oratile Nowe =

Botswana athlete (born 2000)

Personal information
- Full name: Oratile Rose Nowe
- Nationality: Botswana
- Born: 20 May 2000 (age 26) Mahalapye, Central, Botswana

Sport
- Sport: Athletics
- Event: Middle distance running

Achievements and titles
- Personal bests: 800m: 1:56.76 (Chorzów, 2025) NR; 1000m: 2:40.87 (Pretoria, 2024) NR; 1500m: 4:11.50 (Pretoria, 2025) NR
Medal record
Women's Athletics
Representing Botswana
African Games
Silver medal – second place	2019 Rabat	4x400m relay
Bronze medal – third place	2023 Accra	4x400m relay
African Championships
Silver medal – second place	2026 Accra	800 m

Oratile Rose Nowe (born 20 May 2000) is a runner from Botswana. She is a multiple-time national champion and the national record holder over 800 metres, 1000 metres, and 1500 metres.

== Biography ==
Nowe grew up playing football before focusing on athletics, and competed as a long distance runner. She is a member of Serowe Athletics Club. She was second in the 5000 metres at the Botswana Games in 2015.

In 2019, she won a silver medal at the 2019 African Games in Rabat in the Women's 4 × 400 metres relay.

She won the 800m at the Botswana Championships in May 2023 in Gaborone. In August 2023, she set a national record time of 2:01.62 for the 800 metres at the 2023 World Athletics Championships in Budapest. At the championships she was also part of the Botswana women's 4 × 400 m relay team.

She ran 2:01.62 again to finish fifth at the delayed 2023 African Games in Accra in March 2024. At those championships she also won a bronze medal in the women's 4 × 400 m relay. In April 2024, she ran a personal best 1:59.69 for the 800 metres in Cape Town. This time was her first time under the two-minute barrier and set a new national record.

In May 2024, she was nominated for Botswana Sportswoman of the Year. She competed in the 800 metres at the 2024 Summer Olympics in Paris in August 2024.

On 12 April 2025, she improved her own national record to 1:58.96 in Gaborone. She ran a new personal best of 1:58.47 in the 800 metres at the Kip Keino Classic in Nairobi on 31 May 2025. She placed sixth over 800 metres in June 2025 in Stockholm at the 2025 BAUHAUS-galan event, part of the 2025 Diamond League. She set a national record of 1:57.49 to finish in second place in the 800 metres at the Golden Spike Ostrava on 24 June. She set a new national record at the 2025 Kamila Skolimowska Memorial, in Poland, with a run of 1:56.76 to finish third behind Lilian Odira and Keely Hodgkinson in the 800 metres. On 20 August, she placed fifth over 800 metres at the 2025 Athletissima in wet conditions in Lausanne.

In September 2025, she was a semi-finalist in the women's 800 metres at the 2025 World Athletics Championships in Tokyo, Japan.

In May 2026, she won the silver medal behind Ethiopian Msgana Hailu in the 800 metres at the 2026 African Championships in Athletics in Accra, Ghana. Later that month, she finished fourth in the 800 metres in the 2026 Diamond League meeting in Rabat. On 19 June, she placed fifth in 1:58.66 at the 2026 Doha Diamond League. She was a finalist in the 800 metres at the 2026 Commonwealth Games in Glasgow, Scotland, placing fourth overall. At the 2026 Diamond League Final in Brussels in September, she placed fifth over 800 metres. Later that month, she competed over 800 m at the inaugural World Ultimate Championship in Budapest.
