= 2026 African Championships in Athletics – Women's 1500 metres =

Women's 1500 metres at the 2026 African Championships in Athletics
- Venue: Legon Sports Stadium
- Location: Accra, Ghana
- Dates: 17 May
- Competitors: 13 from 8 nations
- Winning time: 4:15.40

Medalists
gold medal	Karabo More	South Africa
silver medal	Vivian Chebet Kiprotich	Kenya
bronze medal	Souad Elhaddad	Morocco

The men's 1500 metres event at the 2026 African Championships in Athletics was held on 17 May in Accra, Ghana. The competition took place in pouring rain.

== Results ==
Rank	Athlete	Nationality	Time	Notes
1st place, gold medalist(s)	Karabo More	South Africa	4:15.4	
2nd place, silver medalist(s)	Vivian Chebet Kiprotich	Kenya	4:15.5	
3rd place, bronze medalist(s)	Souad Elhaddad	Morocco	4:16.0	
4	Desta Tadele	Ethiopia	4:16.2	
5	Adanu Nenko	Ethiopia	4:17.6	
6	Faith Chebet	Kenya	4:19.0	
7	Knight Aciru	Uganda	4:23.5	
8	Mary Ekiru	Kenya	4:23.7	
9	Kanari Teclemaryam	Eritrea	4:29.2	
10	Aderonke Akanbi	Nigeria	4:34.7	
11	Adiam Yehdego	Eritrea	4:37.5	
12	Matebe Fikadu	Ethiopia	4:39.7	
12	Joana Haleca	Angola	4:39.7	
	Sisilia Ginoka Panga	Tanzania	DNS	
