= Claudia Hollingsworth =

Australian athlete (born 2005)

- Hollingsworth at the 2026 Commonwealth Games

Personal information
- Born: 12 April 2005 (age 21) East Melbourne, Victoria Australia
- Height: 1.66 m (5 ft 5 in)

Sport
- Sport: Track and Field
- Events: 800 metres, 1500 metres

Achievements and titles
- Personal bests: 800 m: 1:57.67 (Chorzów, 2025) AR; 1500 m: 3:58.09 (Box Hill, 2026); 3000m: 8:37.42 (Hobart, 2026)
Medal record
Women's athletics
Representing Australia
Commonwealth Games
| Bronze medal – third place | 2026 Glasgow | Mile |
World U20 Championships
| Silver medal – second place | 2024 Lima | 800 m |

Claudia Hollingsworth (/ˈklaʊdiːə/ KLOW-dee-ə; born 12 April 2005) is an Australian athlete. In 2022, she became the Oceanic champion in the 1500 metres as a 17-year-old. In 2024, she became Australian champion and national under-20 record holder over 800 metres and was the silver medalist at the 2024 World U20 Championships. She represented Australia at the 2024 Olympic Games and 2025 World Athletics Championships, setting a senior Oceania record for the 800 metres in 2025. The following year, she also became Australian champion over 1500 m and 3000 metres and won the bronze medal in the mile run at the 2026 Commonwealth Games.

== Early life ==
Hollingsworth was a student at Mentone Grammar and was a keen Australian rules football player, playing for the East Brighton Vampires and the Sandringham Dragons, and considered a future application to the AFL Women's draft process before deciding to focus on track and field athletics. Hollingsworth is coached by four-time Olympian and former world 5000m bronze medallist Craig Mottram.

== Career ==
Hollingsworth was selected for the Australian team to compete in the 2021 World U20 Championships, but ultimately the team didn't travel to Nairobi for the Championships due to the COVID-19 pandemic. She was competing with Olympic standard athletes before she was sixteen years old. In March 2021, Hollingsworth aged 15 ran the fastest-ever time worldwide for an U18 athlete in the 1000 metres.

Hollingsworth won the 2022 Oceania Athletics Championships in the 1500 metres and was runner up in the 800 metres. She was chosen to compete for Australia at the 2022 World Athletics Championships. Due to her young age Hollingsworth could only choose one distance race to compete in, and chose the 800 metres. She also competed at the 2022 World Athletics U20 Championships in Cali, Colombia.

In Canberra in March 2024, Hollingsworth ran her third consecutive Australian and area under-20 record of 1:58.81 for the 800 metres. In Adelaide in April 2024, she ran 1:58.40 to win the Australian Athletics Championships 800 metres race, and set a new national under-20 record. She competed in the 800 metres at the 2024 Summer Olympics in Paris in August 2024, reaching the semi-finals.

Hollingsworth won the silver medal in the 800 metres at the 2024 World Athletics U20 Championships in Lima, Peru in August 2024.

In March 2025, Hollingsworth ran a meeting record 4:05.98 for the 1500 metres to win at the Maurie Plant Meet in Melbourne.

She set a new area record at the 2025 Kamila Skolimowska Memorial, in Poland, part of the 2025 Diamond League, with a run of 1:57.67 for the 800 metres. She was a semi-finalist in the women's 800 metres at the 2025 World Athletics Championships in Tokyo, Japan.

In February 2026, Hollingsworth ran 8:37.42 to become Australian champion over 3000 metres at the Hobart Track Classic. Competing at the 2026 Maurie Plant Meet in Melbourne she won the 1500 metres in 4:01.30, ahead of Great Britain's world indoor champion Georgia Hunter Bell. On 10 April 2026, she was first across the line in the 1500 metres at the Australian Championships but was initially disqualified for a racing incident that saw Jessica Hull fall on the home straight, before later being reinstated on appeal. On 12 April, she was runner-up to defending champion Abbey Caldwell over 800 metres at the championships. On 14 July, she was runner-up to Caldwell again at the István Gyulai Memorial, in Budapest, over 1500 metres with Caldwell later also leading an Australian 1-2-3 in the mile run at the 2026 Commonwealth Games with Jess Hull in silver and Hollingsworth winning the bronze medal.

== Personal life ==
Her twin sister Gemma is a singer who has appeared on stage and as a contestant on television series The Voice Australia, while another sister, Sunday, competes as a trampolinist.
