= Manqabang Tsibela =

Mosotho runner (born 2004)

Personal information
- Nationality: Lesotho
- Born: 4 March 2004 (age 22)

Sport
- Sport: Athletics
- Event: Middle-distance running

Achievements and titles
- Personal bests: 800 m: 2:02.30 NR (2026)

Manqabang Tsibela (Born 4 March 2004) is a Mosotho middle-distance runner. She is the current national record holder in the 800 metres and has represented Lesotho internationally at the 2022 and 2026 Commonwealth Games.

== Biography ==
Tsibela competed in the 800 and 1500 metres events at the 2022 Commonwealth Games in Birmingham and did not progress past the heats. In 2023, she raced the 800 metres at the 2023 African U20 Championships in Ndola. At the 2026 Commonwealth Games in Glasgow, Tsibela competed in the 800 metres and the mile, qualifying for the semi-finals in the former event.
