= Karabo More =

South African long-distance runner (born 2002)

Personal information
- Born: 21 April 2002 (age 24) Orlando, Soweto, South Africa

Sport
- Country: South Africa
- Sport: Athletics
- Events: Middle-distance running, Long-distance running, Cross country running
- Club: Boxer Athletics Club
- Coached by: Violet Semenya and Caster Semenya

Achievements and titles
- Personal bests: 800m: 2:04.03 (2026); 1500m: 4:05.90(2026); Mile Run: 4:29:11 NR (2026); 5000m: 15:51.84 (2025); 10,000m: 37:16.79 (2023); Road; 5k: 16:38 (2025); 10k: 32:34 (2026)
Medal record
Women's athletics
Representing South Africa
African Championships
Gold medal – first place	2026 Accra	1500 m
- Updated on 19 October 2026

Karabo More (born 21 April 2002) is a South African middle- and long-distance and cross country runner. She represented South Africa at the 2026 World Athletics Cross Country Championships and won the South Africa national title and the 2026 African Championships over 1500 metres that year.

== Biography ==
From Orlando, Soweto, More had a top-ten finish during the Johannesburg leg of the 2023 Totalsports Women's Race. The following year, she began training with Violet Semenya in Pretoria as part of the Caster Semenya running group.

More won the South African national 4 km cross country title in September 2024, which she then followed with victory at the Boxer Super Run 5 km in Durban the following month. That month, she had a second-place finish at the Thembisa Mile 10 km, running 35:02 to finish as runner-up to her training partner Karabo Mailula.

Running for Athletics Gauteng North (AGN), More won the 5 km event at the 2025 Athletics South Africa (ASA) Road Running Championships in Phalaborwa, Limpopo. On 3 October, she won the 2 km cross country race at the South African Cross Country Trials, which was incorporated into the USSA Cross Country Championships, at Tshwane University of Technology. More subsequently represented South Africa in the mixed relay at the 2026 World Athletics Cross Country Championships in Tallahassee in January 2026, placing sixth overall alongside Luan Munnik, Christopher Swart and Carina Viljoen.

In February, she won over 1000 metres in 2:39.72 at the USN Simbine Classic Shootout. In April, More won the South Africa national title over 1500 metres ahead of Prudence Sekgodiso. Later that month, she placed second to Sekgodiso in the 1500 metres in 4:11.90 at the Simbine Classic in South Africa. In May, More won the gold medal in 4:15.40 at the 2026 African Championships in Athletics in Accra, Ghana, ahead of Vivian Chebet Kiprotich of Kenya. More won in the mile run in 4:37 at the ASA Road Running Championships on 27 June in Gqeberha. More was a finalist in the mile at the 2026 Commonwealth Games in Glasgow, Scotland.
