= Janet Jepkemoi =

Kenyan middle-distance runner

Personal information
- Full name: Janet Jepkemoi Amimo
- Born: 20 August 2005 (age 20)

Sport
- Sport: Athletics
- Event: Middle-distance running

Achievements and titles
- Personal best: 800m: 1:59.01 (2026)

Janet Jepkemoi Amimo (born 20 August 2005) is a Kenyan middle-distance runner.

== Biography ==
In June 2024, Jepkemoi ran 2:03.18 for 800 metres to place second behind Sarah Moraa in the Kenyan U20 Trials in Nairobi. She represented Kenya in the 800 metres at the 2024 World Athletics U20 Championships in Lima, Peru in August 2024.

Competing for the University of Kentucky in the United States in May 2026, Jepkemoi ran a personal best 1:59.01 to place second in the 800 metres at the 2026 SEC Outdoor Championahips in Auburn. She placed eighth at the 2026 NCAA Outdoor Championships over 800 metres in June.

In June 2026, she placed third over 800 metres at the Kenyan Athletics Championships and Commonwealth Games trials. She was subsequently selected for her senior international debut at the age of 20 years-old as part of the Kenyan team for the 2026 Commonwealth Games in Glasgow, Scotland, where she qualified for the semi-final of the 800 metres.
