= Cierra Jackson =

American discus thrower

Personal information
- Born: 28 August 2002 (age 24)

Sport
- Sport: Athletics
- Event: Discus throw

Achievements and titles
- Personal bests: Discus: 71.72m (2026); Shot Put: 17.77m (2025); Hammer: 65.89m (2025)

Cierra Jackson (born 28 August 2002) is an American discus thrower. She won the 2025 NCAA Outdoor Championships title and set a Diamond League record of 71.72 metres at the 2026 London Athletics Meet.

== Early life ==
She is from Chandler, Arizona and has four siblings. She attended Chandler High School where she took part in cheerleading as well as athletics, not taking athletics too seriously until the latter stages of her time in high school when she also became interested in weight lifting. She graduated from Fresno State University in 2025.

== Career ==
Attending Fresno State University, she broke school records in the shot put (indoors and outdoors) and the discus throw; breaking the discus record of Lacy Barnes. In 2024 became the first Fresno State Bulldog to win medals in three separate events at a single Mountain West Conference championship.

She competed for Fresno State and won the 2025 NCAA Division I Outdoor Track and Field Championships in Eugene, Oregon, throwing a personal best and meet record of 65.82 metres in the first round, beating the previous championship record set in 2021 by Jorinde Van Klinken. She became the first athlete from Fresno State to win an outdoor title and the first to win one at all since pole vaulter Melissa Price indoors in 1999. She also gained first-team All-America honours in the shot put competition, placing eighth overall with a best throw of 17.70m and in doing so, became the first Fresno State athlete to earn two first-team honours at the same championships.

Shortly after winning the NCAA title she turned professional, signing with Elite Athletes Network. In her first meeting as a pro she placed second with a personal best 67.82 metres at the 2025 Prefontaine Classic. She placed ninth in the discus at the 2025 USA Outdoor Track and Field Championships in Eugene, Oregon on 3 August 2025 with a throw of 58.33 metres.

On 28 March 2026, she placed third in the discus throw at the USATF Winter Long Throws National Championship in Arizona with a throw of 62.83 metres. She placed seventh in the discus throw at the 2026 Xiamen Diamond League meeting on 23 May, with a throw of 62.66 metres. Later that month, she placed fourth with a throw of 65.79 metres in the 2026 Diamond League meeting in Rabat. Competing at the 2026 London Athletics Meet on 18 July, Jackson produced a Diamond League record of 71.72m in the final round, an improvement of her personal best by four metres, and added 34cm to the previous diamond league record set by Sandra Elkasević in Doha in 2018. It was also the longest discus throw anywhere in the world, apart from Ramona, Oklahoma, since 1989. Competing at the 2026 USA Outdoor Track and Field Championships in New York on 26 July, she finished runner-up to defending champion Valarie Sion with 67.40 metres.
