= Nigist Getachew =

Ethiopian middle-distance runner (born 2002)

Personal information
- Nationality: Ethiopian
- Born: 28 February 2002 (age 24)

Sport
- Sport: Athletics
- Event: Middle-distance running

Achievements and titles
- Personal bests: 800m: 1:57.01 (Heusden-Zolder, 2025); 1500m: 3:58.98 (Paris, 2024); Indoor; 800m: 1:59.32 (Toruń, 2026)
Medal record
Women's athletics
Representing Ethiopia
World Indoor Championships
Silver medal – second place	2025 Nanjing	800 metres

Nigist Getachew (28 February 2002) is an Ethiopian middle-distance runner. She was a silver medalist over 800 metres at the 2025 World Athletics Indoor Championships.

== Biography ==
=== 2024 ===
She was active on the Diamond League circuit in 2024. She raced over 1500 metres at the 2024 Xiamen Diamond League in China. She ran under two minutes for the 800 metres at the 2024 BAUHAUS-galan in Stockholm, in a race won by Scotland's Jemma Reekie in June 2024. She ran a 1500 metres personal best of 3:58.98 in the Diamond League at the 2024 Meeting de Paris event in July 2024.

She was named as a travelling reserve for the Ethiopian squad for the 2024 Olympic Games in Paris in July 2024. In September 2024, she ran a personal best 1:57.47 for the 800 metres on the World Athletics Continental Gold Tour event in Zagreb.

=== 2025 ===
She was selected for the 2025 World Athletics Indoor Championships in Nanjing in March 2025, where she ran an indoor personal best 1:59.63 to win the silver medal in the women's 800 metres race. She placed sixth in the 800 metres at the 2025 Shanghai Diamond League event in China on 3 May 2025. In September 2025, she competed in the women's 800 metres at the 2025 World Athletics Championships in Tokyo, Japan.

=== 2026 ===
Getachew opened 2026 with a victory and meeting record of 1:59.98 for the 800 metres at the Czech Golden Gala in Ostrava on 3 February 2026. She lowered her indoor personal best to 1:59.54 on 19 February in Liévin. Getachew improved her PB to 1:59.32 to win the 800 metres at the Copernicus Cup in Toruń on 22 February 2026. The following month in Toruń, Poland, she placed fourth overall in the final of the 800 m 2026 World Athletics Indoor Championships.

In April, Getachew won the women's 800m, defeating world champion Lilian Odira, in a time of 1:58.79 at the Kip Keino Classic in Nairobi. In May, she ran 1:58.58 in the 800 metres competing in the 2026 Diamond League meeting in Rabat and on 19 June placed sixth in 1:59.12 at the 2026 Doha Diamond League. In September, she was a finalist over 800 m at the inaugural World Ultimate Championship in Budapest.
