= Lorenza De Noni =

Italian middle-distance runner (born 2006)

Personal information
- Born: 19 January 2006 (age 20)

Sport
- Sport: Athletics
- Event: Middle-distance running

Achievements and titles
- Personal best(s): 800m: 2:01.48 (2025); 1500m: 4:20.25 (2024)
Medal record
Women's athletics
Representing Italy
European U20 Championships
| Bronze medal – third place | 2025 Tampere | 800 m |
European Youth Olympic Festival
| Silver medal – second place | 2022 Banská Bystrica | 800 m |

Lorenza De Noni (born 19 January 2006) is an Italian middle-distance runner.

== Early and personal life ==
From Conegliano, in Treviso, the daughter of Paolo and Veronica Piutti, herself a former Italian 800m runner. She has a twin brother, Michele, who is also an athlete, and an older sister, Stella. She graduated from the Marconi Scientific High School in Conegliano, and later enrolled in the Faculty of Agriculture at the University of Udine.

== Career ==
A member of Atletica Silca Conegliano as a youngster, De Noni was trained by Massimo Furcas. She placed second over 800 metres at the 2022 European Youth Olympic Festival in Banská Bystrica, Slovakia.

In 2023, De Noni won the Italian youth championships in the 800 meters, had a fourth place finish at that distance at the 2023 European Youth Olympic Festival in Maribor, Slovenia and represented the Italian national team at the 2023 European Athletics U20 Championships in Jerusalem, Israel.

De Noni won the 1500 metres and was runner-up in the 800m at the Italian U20 Indoor Championships in February 2024. De Noni placed fifth overall in the 800 metres at the 2024 World Athletics U20 Championships in Lima, Peru, in August 2024.

She won the bronze medal in the 800 metres at the 2025 European Athletics U20 Championships in Tampere, Finland, in a time of in 2:01:86. In October 2025, De Noni joined the Penitentiary Police Corps' athletics team, Fiamme Azzurre.

De Noni opened her 2026 indoor season with a win over 800 metres at the Antequera Indoor Match, a 2026 World Athletics Indoor Tour Challenger meeting, on 17 January 2026, ahead of Shaikira King of Great Britain.
