= Lilian Odira =

Kenyan athlete (born 1999)

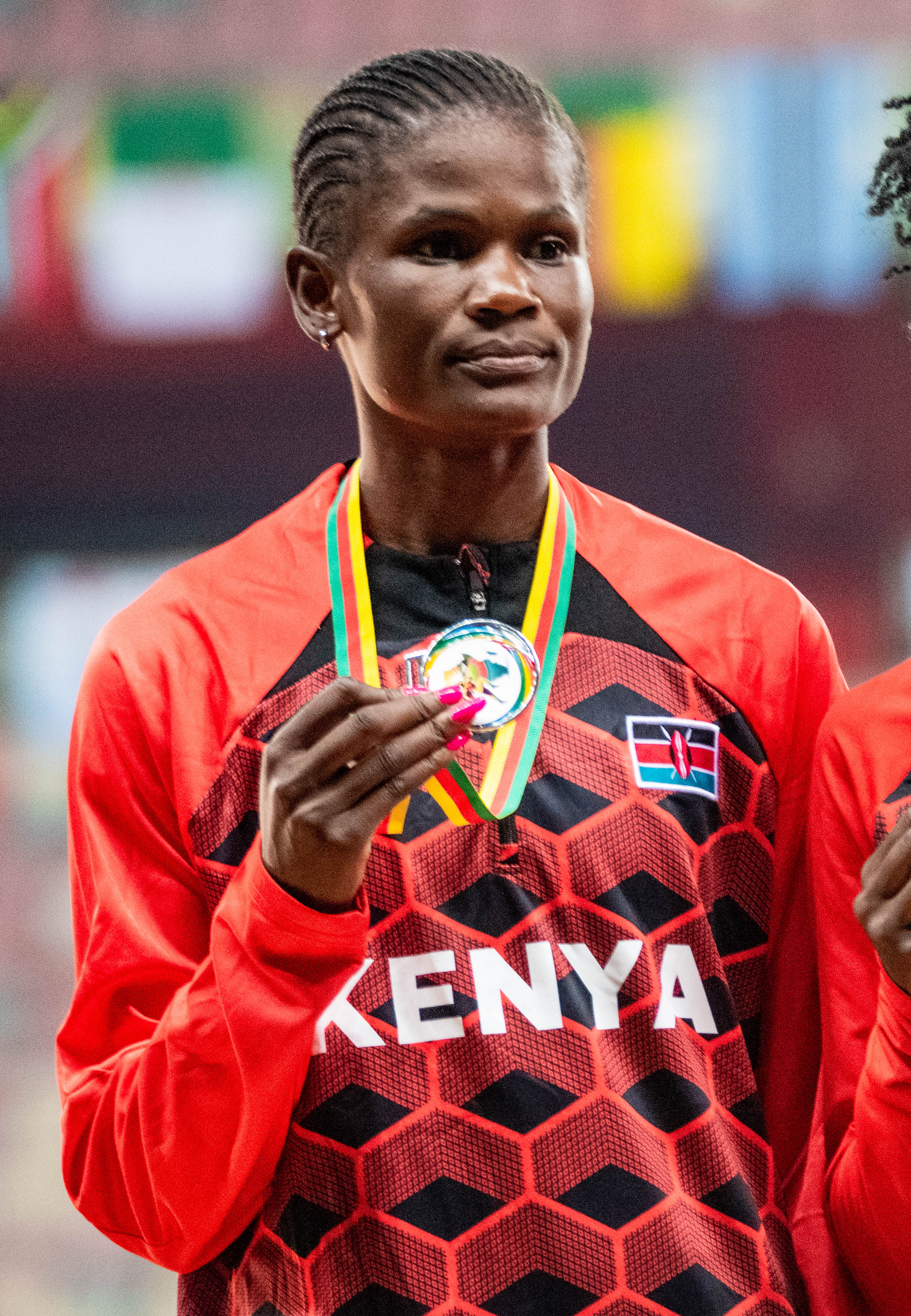

Personal information
- Nationality: Kenyan
- Born: 18 April 1999 (age 27) Migori County, Kenya

Sport
- Sport: Athletics
- Event: Middle distance running

Achievements and titles
- Personal best: 800 m: 1:54.62 ( 2025)
Medal record
Women's athletics
Representing Kenya
World Championships
Gold medal – first place	2025 Tokyo	800 m
Commonwealth Games
Silver medal – second place	2026 Glasgow	800 m
African Championships
Silver medal – second place	2024 Douala	800 m

Lilian Odira (born 18 April 1999) is a Kenyan middle distance runner. She is the reigning World Champion over 800 metres, having won the title at the 2025 World Championships. In 2024, she became Kenyan national champion over 800 metres, retaining her title in 2025. She was a semi-finalist at the 2024 Olympic Games and 2025 World Indoor Championships.

== Biography ==
Odira is from Migori County and grew up in a rural setting. She attended St. Peters Keberesi Secondary School in Kisii County. Initially a cross country runner, in 2016, aged 17, Odira won the Kenyan national high school title in the 800 metres before placing third at the East African School Games.

She had a maternity break in 2020 and returned to competition in 2023. She runs for the Kenyan Prisons services and has been coached since close to the start of her career by Jacinta Murigura.

She competed at the 2024 African Games in Accra in March 2024, and ran 2:00.81 to finish fourth in the women's 800 m. In May 2024, she became Kenyan national champion over 800 metres in Nairobi, running a time of 2:02.21.

She won the Kenyan Olympic qualifier in June 2024, ahead of Mary Moraa in a time of 1:59.27. This time also met the qualifying standard for the 2024 Paris Olympics. She won silver at the African Championships in Doula, Cameroon in June 2024, running a time of 2:00.36.

She competed in the 800 metres at the 2024 Summer Olympics in Paris in August 2024, reaching the semi-finals where she finished fourth in her heat in 1:58.53 behind Keely Hodgkinson, Nia Akins and Prudence Sekgodiso.

Odira placed third at the Athletics Kenya (AK) Prisons Cross Country Championships, held on 18 January 2025, in Ruiru. She was a semifinalist at the 2025 World Athletics Indoor Championships in Nanjing in March 2025.

She ran a new personal best of 1:58.31 to win the 800 metres at the Kip Keino Classic in Nairobi on 31 May 2025. She retained her 800 metres title at the Kenyan Athletics Championships in June 2025. She won the Athletics Kenya World Championship Trials the following month. She set a new personal best in the 800 metres at the 2025 Kamila Skolimowska Memorial, part of the 2025 Diamond League, with a run of 1:56.52 to finish runner-up to Keely Hodgkinson.

She was subsequently named in the Kenyan team for the 800 metres at the 2025 World Athletics Championships in Tokyo, Japan. In Tokyo, she won her semifinal heat in 1:56.85 ahead of Switzerland's Audrey Werro, before winning the final in a personal best time of 1:54.62 ahead of Georgia Hunter Bell and Keeley Hodgkinson with compatriot Sarah Moraa in fourth, in a race in which teammate Mary Moraa took the race out fast in the first 400 metres. Speaking after the race, Odira said that the Kenyans "worked as a team. We knew Mary was strong over 400 m, so she was to set the pace. From there, the best athlete would emerge". The time was the seventh all-time best performance and a championship record beating by 0.06sec the previous best set by Czech runner Jarmila Kratochvilova in 1983.

In her first race since the world championships triumph, Odira was runner-up to Nigist Getachew in the women's 800m, having run 1:59.15, at the Kip Keino Classic in April 2026. On 31 May, she placed third in 1:57.27 in the 800 metres at the 2026 Diamond League in Rabat. In June, she won the Kenyan national title over 800 metres for the third consecutive year. On 4 July, Odira won the 800 metres at the 2026 Prefontaine Classic in 1:56.19, winning ahead of Hodgkinson for her first Diamond League victory. On 31 July, she won the silver medal in the 800 metres at the 2026 Commonwealth Games in Glasgow, finishing behind Georgia Hunter Bell but 0.03 seconds ahead of Australian Sarah Billings.

== Personal life ==
Odira moved to Nairobi in 2017 after leaving school. She has two sons, born in 2020 and 2023, who were aged four and two when she won the world championships 800 metres title in September 2025.

== Personal bests ==
Personal bests in individual events
Event	Time	Location	Date
400 metres	58.26	Nairobi, Kenya	27 April 2023
800 metres	1:54.62	Tokyo, Japan	21 September 2025
800 metres short track	2:01.24 i	Lyon, France	15 February 2025
1500 metres	4:21.5 h	Nairobi, Kenya	26 April 2025
