= Sarah Moraa =

Kenyan athlete (born 2005)

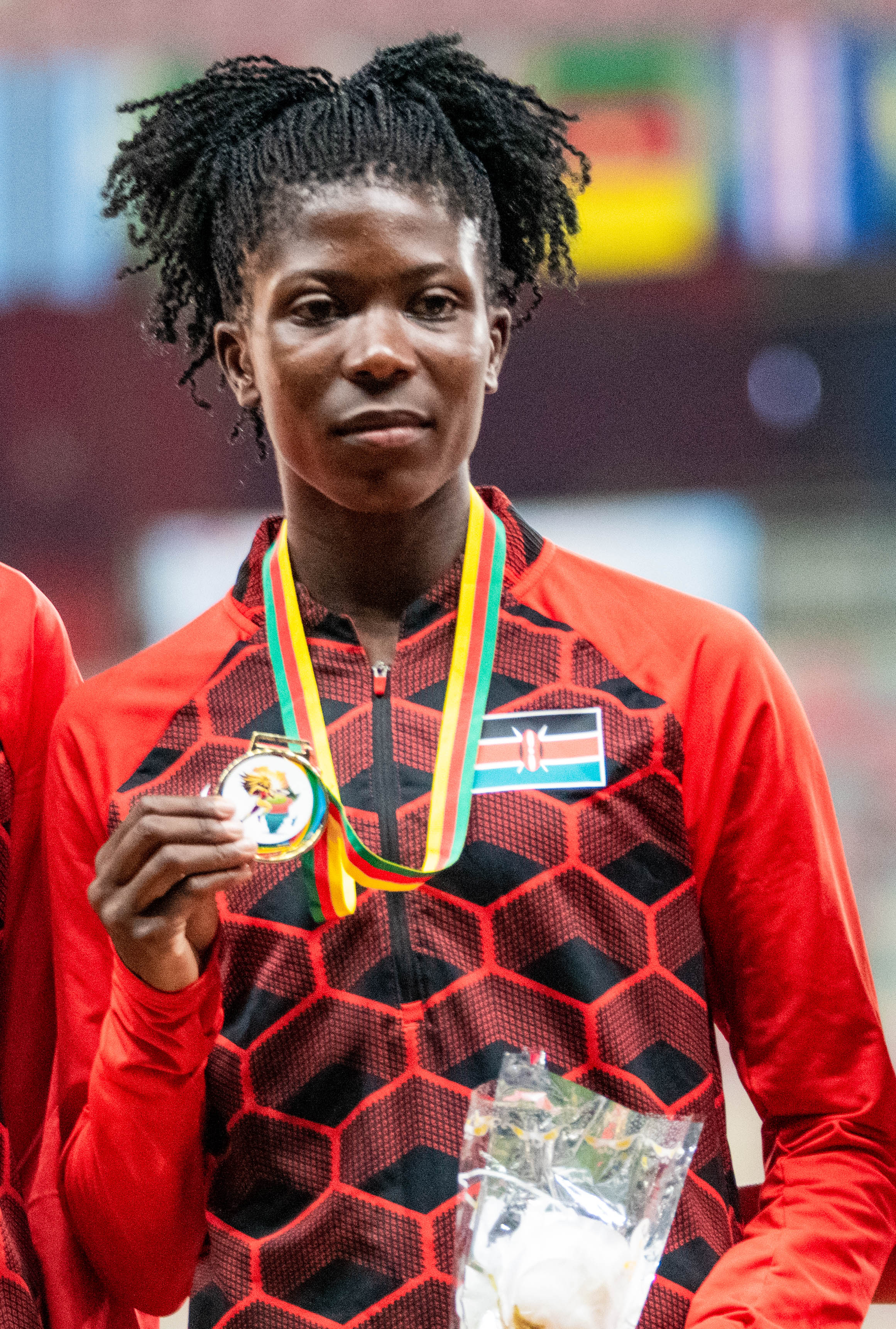

Personal information
- Nationality: Kenyan
- Born: 26 October 2005 (age 21)

Sport
- Sport: Athletics
- Event: Middle distance running

Achievements and titles
- Personal bests: 800m: 1:55.74 (Tokyo, 2025)
Medal record
Women's athletics
Representing Kenya
African Championships
Gold medal – first place	2024 Douala	800 m
World U20 Championships
Gold medal – first place	2024 Lima	800 m

Sarah Moraa (born 26 October 2005) is a Kenyan middle distance runner. She was a gold medalist at the 2024 African Championships over 800 metres and placed fourth in the 800 metres at the 2025 World Championships.

Moraa attended Mogonga Pag Secondary School. She is the cousin of Kenyan runner Mary Moraa, who has described her as her "kid sister" on social media.

Moraa finished third at the Kenyan Olympic trials over 800 metres in June 2024. She won gold over that distance at the African Championships in Doula, Cameroon in June 2024, running a time of 2:00.27. She won gold in the 800 metres at the 2024 World Athletics U20 Championships in Lima, Peru in August 2024.

She ran a new personal best of 1:58.96 in the 800 metres at the Kip Keino Classic in Nairobi on 31 May 2025. She was runner-up to Lilian Odira in the 800 metres at the Kenyan Athletics Championships in June 2025. The following month, she placed third at the Athletics Kenya World Championship Trials. She was subsequently named in the Kenyan team for the women's 800 metres at the 2025 World Athletics Championships in Tokyo, Japan, placing fourth in the final in a new personal best of 1:55.74, finishing behind her gold medal-winning compatriot Lilian Odira.

== International competitions ==
Representing Kenya
Year	Competition	Venue	Position	Event	Time
2024	African Championships	Douala, Cameroon	1st	800 m	2:00.27
2024	World U20 Championships	Lima, Peru	1st	800 m	2:00.36
2025	World Championships	Tokyo, Japan	4th	800 m	1:55.74
