= Vivian Chebet Kiprotich =

Kenyan athlete (born 1996)

Vivian Kiprotich
Personal information
- Full name: Vivian Chebet Kiprotich
- Nationality: Kenyan
- Born: 7 January 1996 (age 30)

Sport
- Sport: Athletics

Achievements and titles
- Personal bests: 800m: 1:58.26 (Nairobi, 2024)
Medal record
Women's athletics
Representing Kenya
African Games
Bronze medal – third place	2023 Accra	800 m
African Championships
Silver medal – second place	2026 Accra	1500 m

Vivian Chebet Kiprotich (born 7 January 1996), also known as Vivian Kiprotich or Vivian Chebet, is a Kenyan track and field athlete who competes as a middle-distance runner.

== Biography ==
In May 2023, she ran a personal best time of 2:00.53 for the 800 metres at the Kip Keino Classic. In June 2023 she lowered her personal best to a time of 1:58.80 for 800 metres in Huelva. She competed for Kenya at the 2023 World Athletics Championships – Women's 800 metres in Budapest.

She was selected to compete for Kenya at the 2024 World Athletics Indoor Championships. She ran a personal best indoors time of 2:00.80 to qualify for the semi-final, and lowered it to 1:59.65 to qualify for the final. In the final she finished in fourth place.

In March 2024, she won bronze in the 800 metres at the African Games. She lowered her personal best to 1:58.26 as she finished runner-up to Mary Moraa at the Kip Keino Classic in April 2024. She finished second in the 800 metres at the 2024 BAUHAUS-galan in Stockholm on 2 June 2024.

She competed in the 800 metres at the 2024 Summer Olympics in Paris in August 2024, where she reached the semi-finals.

She was selected for the 2025 World Athletics Indoor Championships in Nanjing in March 2025. In July 2025, she was runner-up at the Athletics Kenya World Championship Trials. She subsequently competed in the women's 800 metres at the 2025 World Athletics Championships in Tokyo, Japan.

In May 2026, she won the silver medal over 1500 metres at the 2026 African Championships in Athletics in Accra, Ghana, behind Karabo More of South Africa. She represented Kenya in the 800 metres at the 2026 Commonwealth Games in Glasgow, Scotland.
