= SALC =

SALC or Salc may refer to:

- Salč, a settlement in Ulcinj Municipality, Montenegro
- South Andhra Lutheran Church, Christian denomination in India
- South Australian Land Company, formed before British colonisation of South Australia
- South Australian Legislative Council, one of the two chambers of the Parliament of South Australia
- Southern Africa Litigation Centre, litigant in Southern Africa Litigation Centre v National Director of Public Prosecutions
- Symmetry-adapted linear combination (disambiguation)

== See also ==
- Salk (disambiguation)
