= Muluka-Anne Miti-Drummond =

Zambian lawyer

- Education: University of Venda, University of Pretoria Faculty of Law and Open University
- Occupation: lawyer
- Employer: Amnesty International et al

Muluka-Anne Miti-Drummond is a Zambian lawyer who became the United Nations Independent Expert on the "enjoyment of human rights by persons with albinism".

== Life ==
Miti-Drummond graduated with a law degree from the University of Venda in South Africa. Her master's degree is from the University of Pretoria Faculty of Law and she studied with the Open University to obtain a Master of Science degree in Development Management.

Miti-Drummond has worked for Amnesty International using her knowledge of Spanish and Portuguese in their research. She has also worked until 2021 for the International Bar Association’s Human Rights Institute who support the High Level Panel of Legal Experts on Media Freedom. She became the second United Nations Independent Expert on the "enjoyment of human rights by persons with Albinism" in August 2021.

She has worked for the Southern Africa Litigation Centre. The centre has campaigned to get South Africa to adopt the United Nations Declaration on Human Rights. Miti-Drummond complained that the Sudanese President Omar al-Bashir (who is accused of genocide) was able to visit South Africa. In her opinion he should be arrested to face charges under international law.

She visited Madagascar in September 2022 as part of her work on human rights and albinism. She wrote a report recording the positive measures they are taking in Madagascar to avoid discrimination and she made recommendation to the United Nations Human Rights Council in 2023. During her term she has visited and reported on other countries including Brazil, Fiji, Kenya, Malawi, Panama and Tanzania. In 2024 she submitted her report on the right to education by people with albinism to the 55th session of the UN's Human Rights Council.

She has been a visiting fellow of Staffordshire University.

== See also ==
- Naomie Pilula
- Makebi Zulu
- Justin Chinyanta
