= Jeremy Gauntlett =

British–South African lawyer

Jeremy Gauntlett SC, KC
- Born: Jeremy John Gauntlett; 10 November 1950 (age 75); Salisbury, Southern Rhodesia (now Harare, Zimbabwe)
- Citizenship: South Africa, United Kingdom
- Education: Stellenbosch University; New College, Oxford
- Spouse: Tessa Finlay (deceased)

Jeremy John Gauntlett SC, KC (born 10 November 1950) is a British–South African lawyer practising public and commercial law. He entered legal practice as an advocate in Cape Town in 1976 and was admitted to the Bar of England and Wales in 1994. In addition to his chambers in Cape Town and Johannesburg.

== Early life and education ==
Gauntlett was born on 10 November 1950 in Harare, Zimbabwe, where he grew up. He attended Stellenbosch University on a Beit Scholarship, graduating with a BA cum laude in 1971 and a BA cum laude in 1973 and then took a Rhodes Scholarship, completing a BCL at New College, Oxford in 1976.

== Legal career ==
Upon his return to South Africa from Oxford, Gauntlett moved to Cape Town, joining the Cape Bar as an advocate in December 1976. He took silk in South Africa in 1989 and joined the Johannesburg Bar in 1994. At the same time, he was called to the Bar of England and Wales in 1994 and in February 2017, he was named Queen's Counsel by Elizabeth II.

=== Notable briefs ===
Gauntlett has frequently acted for South African state agencies in high-profile matters, including President Jacob Zuma in Economic Freedom Fighters v Speaker of the National Assembly (on the Nkandla saga), the state in Minister of Justice and Constitutional Development v Southern African Litigation Centre (on South Africa's obligation to arrest Omar al-Bashir under the Rome Statute), the South African Police Service in National Commissioner of the South African Police Service v Southern African Human Rights Litigation Centre (on universal jurisdiction), the South African Reserve Bank in South African Reserve Bank and Another v Shuttleworth (Mark Shuttleworth's challenge to exchange control regulations), the KwaZulu-Natal government in Abahlali BaseMjondolo Movement v Premier of KwaZulu-Natal (Abahlali baseMjondolo's challenge to the KwaZulu-Natal Slums Act), Eskom in National Energy Regulator of South Africa v Borbet, Eskom v Borbet (on energy tariffs), and the South African Human Rights Commission in Semenya v Switzerland (Caster Semenya's appeal to the European Court of Human Rights).

His non-state clients in South Africa have included Solidarity, in Solidarity v Department of Correctional Services in the Constitutional Court; the Mail & Guardian, in President v M&G Media, a right to information matter in the Supreme Court of Appeal; and Schabir Shaik in his corruption trial.

=== Other activities ===
Gauntlett was a sessional appeal judge in the Lesotho Court of Appeal between March 1997 and December 2010, and he was an acting judge in the High Court of South Africa on several occasions from 1991 onwards. After two terms as president of the Cape Bar, from 1997 to 1999, he was elected chairman of the General Council of the Bar of South Africa in July 1999; he held the latter position until 2002. He was also a South African Law Reform Commission commissioner between 1996 and 2006.

== Judicial nominations in South Africa ==
On several occasions, Gauntlett was interviewed unsuccessfully by the Judicial Service Commission as a candidate for permanent judicial appointment in South Africa. In September 2009, he was interviewed for a possible appointment to one of four vacancies on the Constitutional Court, nominated by Sydney Kentridge and Gerald Friedman. Still, the Judicial Service Commission did not recommend him for appointment.

The following year, in April 2010, he was shortlisted for permanent appointment to the Western Cape High Court. During his interview with the Judicial Service Commission, he was asked by Commissioner Fatima Chohan about his relationship with Western Cape Judge President John Hlophe, with whom he had publicly clashed. After the interview, the Judicial Service Commission did not recommend him for appointment; several observers objected to his exclusion, including Wim Trengove, who said it was "inexplicable".

In October 2012, Gauntlett was shortlisted for the Western Cape High Court for a final time as one of eight candidates for five vacancies but the Judicial Service Commission of South Africa again declined to recommend him for appointment. The Mail & Guardian suggested that the commission was concerned about Gauntlett's "abrasive" temperament, and the commission itself ultimately wrote to retired justice Louis Harms, who had nominated Gauntlett, to explain its concerns about his "humility" and temperament. In addition, Pierre de Vos suggested that, though "brilliant", Gauntlett was unsuitable because of his "conservative legal philosophy" and "formalistic methods of interpretation," Gauntlett rejected that characterisation.

Shortly afterwards, in November 2012, Gauntlett emerged as a potential candidate to replace Zak Yacoob on the Constitutional Court of South Africa bench. He was nominated by over 60 people, including Mamphela Ramphele, Sir Sydney Kentridge, opposition leaders Helen Zille and Mangosuthu Buthelezi, and 47 legal academics. He was interviewed in February 2013 as one of five candidates for the vacant seat. However, after a fractious interview, the Judicial Service Commission recommended all the candidates but Gauntlett as suitable for appointment.

== Personal life ==
Gauntlett was married to the late Tessa Finlay and has three daughters.

== Controversy ==
On the 16th of January 2025, an academic at the University of the Witwatersrand, Hylton White, posted on social media that Gauntlett had initiated a sexual relationship with him in the 1980s when he was in his 'early teens' and Gauntlett was already practising as an advocate. According to White, he had attempted to inform the Anglican Church in South Africa that Gauntlett was unfit to serve on a three-person panel investigating the Church's handling of sexual assault by John Smyth. The failures of the Anglican Church in the UK regarding Smyth led to the resignation of Archbishop Justin Welby in 2024.

After failing to get a satisfactory response, White decided to publish the information, saying that "the findings of any panel on child sex abuse allegations that involves the influence of Jeremy Gauntlett have no credibility whatsoever."

The accusations were widely reported in South African media on the 18th of January 2025. It was then reported that Gauntlett had already resigned from the panel on the preceding day after the allegations had been made.
