= Athletics at the 2015 African Games – Women's 800 metres =

The women's 800 metres event at the 2015 African Games was held on 13 and 15 September.

== Medalists ==
| Gold | Silver | Bronze |
|---|---|---|
| Caster Semenya; South Africa | Annet Mwanzi; Kenya | Chaltu Shume; Ethiopia |

== Results ==
=== Heats ===
Qualification: First 2 in each heat (Q) and the next 2 fastest (q) advanced to the final.

| Rank | Heat | Name | Nationality | Time | Notes |
|---|---|---|---|---|---|
| 1 | 3 | Habitam Alemu | Ethiopia | 2:03.60 | Q |
| 2 | 3 | Winnie Chebet | Kenya | 2:03.81 | Q |
| 3 | 3 | Winnie Nanyondo | Uganda | 2:05.24 | q |
| 4 | 2 | Chaltu Shume | Ethiopia | 2:06.49 | Q |
| 5 | 3 | Abike Egbeniyi | Nigeria | 2:06.52 | q |
| 6 | 2 | Annet Mwanzi | Kenya | 2:06.82 | Q |
| 7 | 1 | Caster Semenya | South Africa | 2:07.25 | Q |
| 8 | 1 | Amina Bakhit | Sudan | 2:07.28 | Q |
| 9 | 1 | Kore Tola | Ethiopia | 2:07.44 | |
| 10 | 2 | Adama Alawia | Sudan | 2:07.84 | |
| 11 | 1 | Sylvia Chesebe | Kenya | 2:08.03 | |
| 12 | 1 | Neide Dias | Angola | 2:09.14 | |
| 13 | 3 | Victoire Elisabe Mandaba | Central African Republic | 2:12.18 | |
| 14 | 3 | Hawa Bundor | Sierra Leone | 2:12.27 | |
| 15 | 2 | Leo Bafoundissa Missamou | Republic of the Congo | 2:12.53 | |
| 16 | 2 | Fiyori Asmelash | Eritrea | 2:13.56 | |
| 17 | 1 | Tsepiang Sello | Lesotho | 2:14.87 | |
| 18 | 3 | Elizabet Nabiala Nkengue | Republic of the Congo | 2:19.87 | |
| 19 | 2 | Mari Nigh Augusto Otolio | South Sudan | 2:41.36 | |
| | 2 | Francine Niyonsaba | Burundi | DNS | |

=== Final ===
| Rank | Name | Nationality | Time | Notes |
|---|---|---|---|---|
| 1st place, gold medalist(s) | Caster Semenya | South Africa | 2:00.97 | |
| 2nd place, silver medalist(s) | Annet Mwanzi | Kenya | 2:01.54 | |
| 3rd place, bronze medalist(s) | Chaltu Shume | Ethiopia | 2:01.59 | SB |
| 4 | Habitam Alemu | Ethiopia | 2:02.29 | |
| 5 | Winnie Chebet | Kenya | 2:02.67 | |
| 6 | Amina Bakhit | Sudan | 2:02.85 | SB |
| 7 | Winnie Nanyondo | Uganda | 2:04.53 | |
| 8 | Abike Egbeniyi | Nigeria | 2:09.36 | |
