= Southern Africa Litigation Centre =

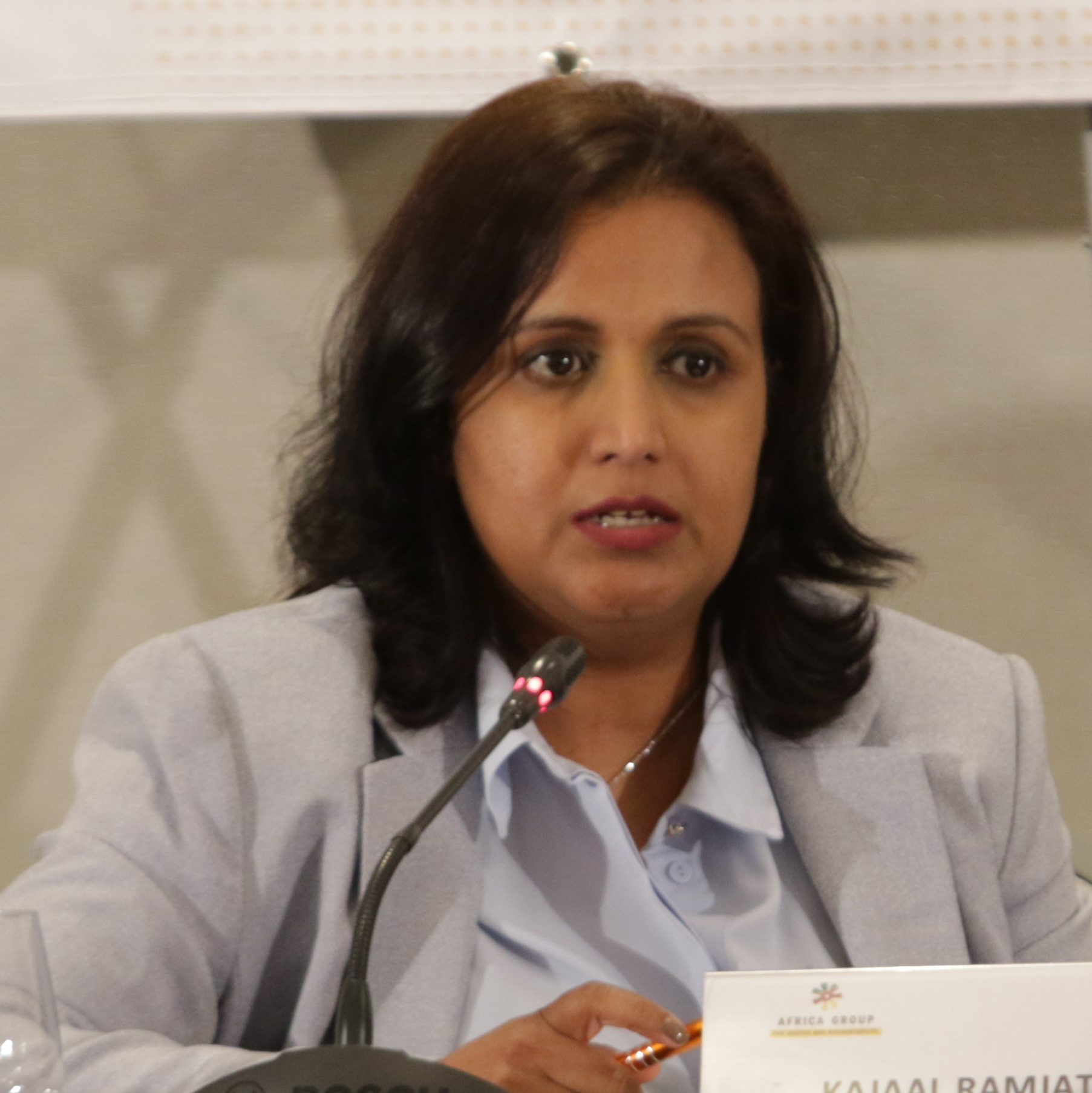
Kaajal Ramjathan-Keogh was the centre's Director from 2015 to 2020

The Southern Africa Litigation Centre or SALC is a non-profit organisation based in Johannesburg, South Africa. The primary objective of SALC is to promote and advance human rights, democratic governance, the rule of law, and access to justice in Southern Africa. The organisation achieves this through strategic litigation, advocacy, and capacity strengthening.

It was founded in 2005 by Dr. Mark Ellis and Dr. Tawanda Mutasah. They conceptualised the organisation and hired Nicole Fritz who served as the first director for ten years. Later, Kaajal Ramjathan-Keogh was appointed director and replaced by Anneke Meerkotter, who currently leads the organisation.

SALC was a joint undertaking of the International Bar Association's and the Open Society Foundations' Initiative for Southern Africa (OSISA). The organisation operates in Angola, Botswana, the Democratic Republic of Congo, Eswatini, Lesotho, Malawi, Mozambique, Namibia, South Africa, Tanzania, Zambia, and Zimbabwe. The organisation promotes human rights and the rule of law in Southern Africa by providing litigation support.

== Overview ==
The Southern Africa Litigation Centre (SALC) provides support to community-based organizations by offering legal assistance and organizational capacity strengthening. The organization's work is divided into five different clusters aimed at advancing the United Nations Sustainable Development Goals, SDGs 1, 2, 3, 5, 6, 10, 11, 13, 14, 15, and 16. The clusters are:

1. Civic Rights Cluster: This cluster focuses on challenging laws and policies that limit freedom of expression, assembly and association.

2. Criminal Justice Cluster: This cluster aims to challenge the use of the criminal justice system in a manner that targets poor and marginalized persons, wide-scale impunity for abusive policing practices, over-criminalization, and overcrowding in prisons.

3. Equality Cluster: This cluster aims to challenge the lack of bodily autonomy, discrimination, unequal access, and legal barriers to the enjoyment of rights. It seeks to support and empower communities to assert their rights, obtain redress for rights violations, and counter any anti-rights backlash.

4. International Justice Cluster: This cluster seeks accountability for international crimes and grave human rights violations by challenging decisions that enable impunity, enforcing international law, and strengthening corporate accountability.

5. Socio-Economic Rights Cluster: This cluster aims to challenge large-scale agricultural and extractive land use that results in customary land dispossession without adequate consent, consultation, and compensation.

== History ==
The Southern Africa Litigation Centre (SALC) has a strong track record of promoting human rights in the region. They have supported landmark cases like ensuring access to antiretroviral medication for foreign prisoners with HIV/AIDS in Botswana, and defending the rights of Lesbian, Gay, Bisexual and Transgender individuals in Botswana by supporting LEGABIBO's campaign to decriminalise same-sex intimacy.

SALC's work extends beyond litigation; they also train human rights lawyers and advocate for positive legal changes throughout Southern Africa. The organisation partners with the UNDP to host the annual African Regional Judges Forum (ARJF). Muluka-Anne Miti-Drummond who is the United Nations Special Rapporteur on Albinism has worked for the centre.

The SALC and Chikondi Chijozi's Centre for Human Rights, Education, Advice and Assistance supported Mayeso Gwanda who had been charged with being "a rogue and a vagabond". He was trying to sell plastic bags in Blantyre, but this arbitrary law was applied to him. This was a British colonial law that existed in several countries. In 2017 the High Court agreed that the law was unconstitutional because it ignored Mayeso Gwanda's "rights to dignity, freedom of movement, and security of person."

Other important cases in which the centre has acted include Southern Africa Litigation Centre v National Director of Public Prosecutions, National Commissioner of the SAPS v Southern Africa Litigation Centre, and Mmusi and Others v Ramantele and Another. The organisation incubated AfricanLII from October 2010 to March 2013.

The organisation supported litigation to review the anti-terrorism laws in Eswatini, where the High Court ruled that some provisions are not constitutional as they infringe on the right to freedom of expression. SALC successfully challenged the common law marital power in Eswatini. The court victory granted equal rights to sue or be sued, contract, and administer property to all Swazi women married under the civil system. The women had also asked the Court to strike those portions of the Marriage Act that distinguish on the basis of race, specifically parts of Section 24 and the entirety of Section 25.

The organisation celebrated the seventy fifth anniversary of the Universal Declaration of Human Rights in New York, where with a panel discussion highlighting the impact of criminalisation in Africa. The panel had speakers including human rights lawyers, academics and grassroots activist share their experiences and insights. Also speaking on the panel was United States Presidential Envoy on LGBTIQ+ rights, Jessica Stern.

The organisation won a landmark case in Malawi where Rastafari children were refused registration in a public school due to their dreadlocks.

The organisation currently works as part of the Global Campaign to Decriminalise Poverty and Status, where it highlights the abuse of power which has a profound human rights cost, manifesting in discrimination, use of lethal force, torture, excessive imprisonment and inhumane conditions of detention. The Campaign is a coalition of organisations from across the world that advocate for the repeal of laws that target people based on poverty, status or for their activism.
