= Eric Vilain =

French-American physician-scientist

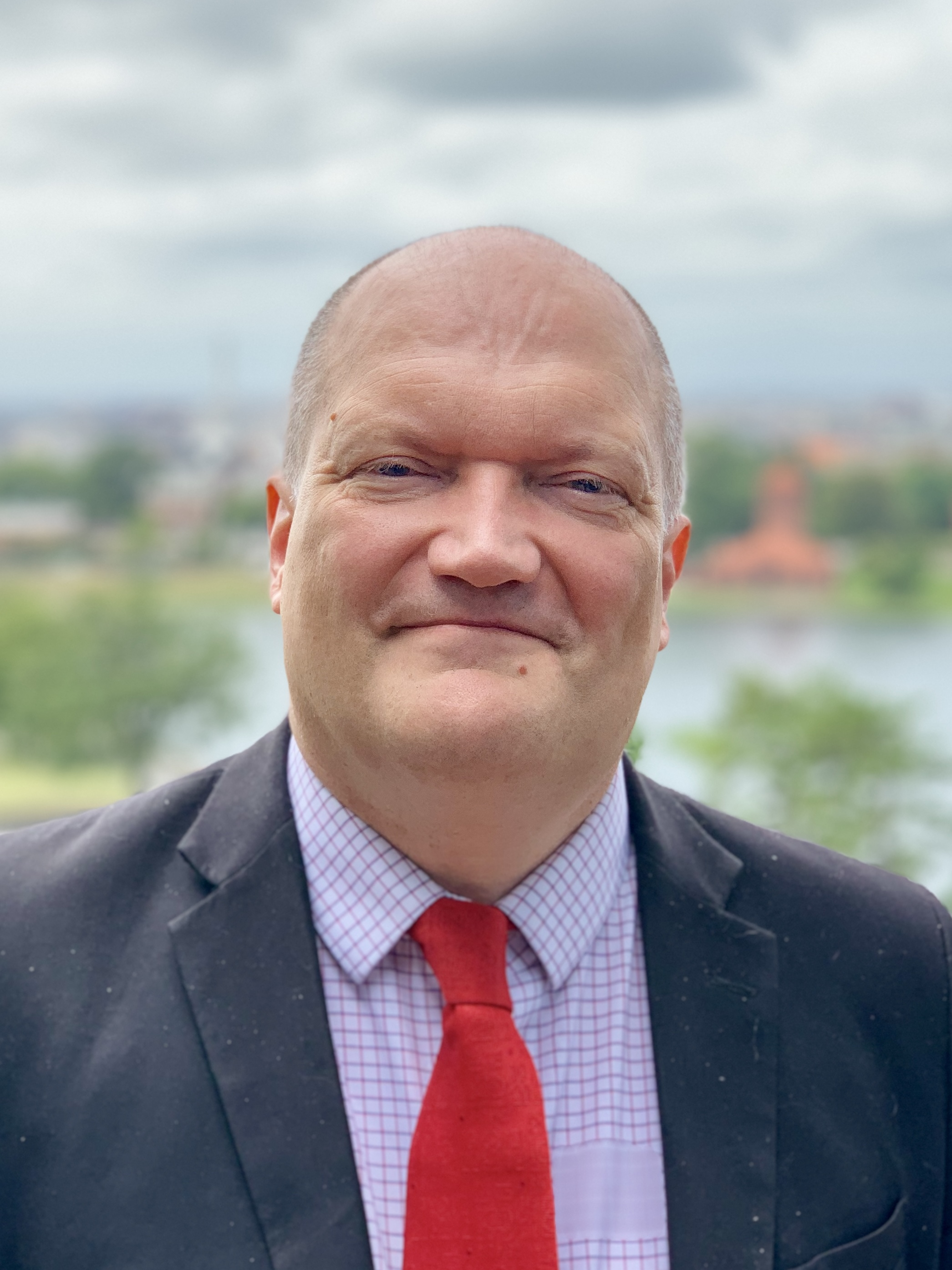
- Vilain in 2019
- Born: 1966 (age 59–60); Paris, France
- Education: Pierre and Marie Curie University; Faculté de Médecine Necker Enfants Malades
- Known for: Genetics of disorders/differences of sex development, biology of gender identity, biology of sexual orientation
- Scientific career
- Fields: Genetics, endocrinology, sexual development
- Workplaces: University of California, Los Angeles – David Geffen School of Medicine Children's National Medical Center George Washington University School of Medicine and Health Sciences University of California, Irvine
- Doctoral advisor: Marc Fellous

Eric J. Vilain is a physician-scientist and professor in the fields of differences of sex development (DSDs) and precision medicine. He is the Associate Vice Chancellor for Scientific Affairs at the University of California, Irvine Health Affairs and also the director of the UCI Institute for Clinical and Translational Science. He previously was the director of the Center for Genetic Medicine Research at Children's National Medical Center and the chair of the Department of Genomics and Precision Medicine at the George Washington University School of Medicine & Health Sciences in Washington, D.C. Vilain is a fellow of the American College of Medical Genetics, serves on the International Olympic Committee's Medical Commission, and sits on the Board of Scientific Counselors for the National Institute of Child Health and Human Development (NICHD).

Vilain is known for his research on the molecular mechanisms of DSDs, using DNA sequencing and animal models to discover the biological bases of sex differentiation. In addition to DSDs, Vilain has also published a large body of research on sex differences in the brain, the biology of sexual orientation, and gender identity. Vilain is described as "one of the world's foremost experts on the genetic determinants of DSDs" in the journal Nature.

== Biography ==
Vilain was born in 1966, in Paris, France. He attended the Faculté de Médecine Necker Enfants Malades in 1983, and obtained his MD in 1989. His first rotation as a medical student was in the referral center for the intersex newborns, which, he notes, was what first drove him to research DSDs. In 1990, Vilain attended the Pasteur Institute at the Université Pierre et Marie Curie and obtained his PhD in genetics in 1994. Vilain then moved to Los Angeles, California in 1995 to complete his residency and to train as a postdoctoral research fellow of Medical Genetics at the University of California, Los Angeles. In 1998, Vilain became a professor of Human Genetics and Pediatrics at the UCLA School of Medicine, and was Chief of Medical Genetics at the Department of Pediatrics and the Department of Urology until 2017. Vilain left UCLA in 2017 to become the director of the Center for Genetic Medicine Research at the Children's National Medical Center and the chair of the Department of Genomics and Precision Medicine at the George Washington University School of Medicine and Health Sciences. In 2022 Vilain became the Associate Vice Chancellor for Scientific Affairs at University of California, Irvine.

== Career and research ==
Vilain is an expert on the Disorders of Sex Development and has published widely on the genetic pathways and molecular mechanisms underlying human sexual development. His early research focused on the gene SRY and its role in the formation of the testes, as well as how certain mutations could explain diseases such as gonadal dysgenesis. During his time at UCLA, he created mouse models to observe the effects of mutations on genes linked to sexual development. In 1999, Vilain was the first geneticist to describe IMAGe syndrome, a rare and severe congenital disease, and in 2012, identified its causative mutations.

In 2005, he was one of the pediatricians present at the International Consensus Conference on Intersex in Chicago, to advocate for the term "disorders of sex development." He also worked with intersex advocate Bo Laurent to remove the term "hermaphrodite" from the medical vocabulary. In August 2006, Vilain, along with other members of pediatric societies signed the Consensus statement on management of intersex disorders, which stated that "terms such as intersex, pseudohermaphroditism, hermaphroditism, sex reversal, and gender based diagnostic labels are particularly controversial." Vilain would write in a 2007 article for Nature Genetics titled "We Used to Call Them Hermaphrodites," that terms such as "intersex" and "hermaphrodite" should be abandoned, due to their connotations. Vilain is currently one of the principal investigators of the Differences/Disorders of Sex Development Translational Research Network (DSD-TRN), a large research network of 10 different medical sites. Vilain and his collaborators started the DSD-TRN in 2012 as a registry to assist in the care of patients with DSDs. As the Chief of Medical Genetics at UCLA, Vilain helped standardize the genetic and phenotypic reporting of DSDs to assist clinicians in interpretation and diagnosis.

In 2011, Vilain was one of the members of the International Olympic Committee Medical Commission and helped revise the policies on female athletes with DSDs such as androgen insensitivity syndrome (AIS), spurred by the case of South African runner Caster Semenya in 2009. The Medical Commission settled on a testosterone limit of 10 nanomoles per liter of blood to be able to participate in women's events. Vilain has expressed reticence on the policy, citing the inconsistent application of the policy by the International Association of Athletic Federations. In 2019, Vilain served as an expert witness defending Caster Semenya's right to compete as a woman in athletic competitions.

Vilain also researches sex differences in the brain, most notably the biology of gender identity and sexual orientation. Along with other collaborators, Vilain and his team have published papers on the expression of sex-regulating genes effecting the differentiation of brains using mouse models and studied the role the SRY gene plays in regulating adult brain function. In 2006, his team, along with geneticist Dean Hamer, published research studying the linkage of gay males and markers on their mothers' X chromosome. During the 2015 conference of the American Society of Human Genetics, his team presented findings on potential epigenetic differences in identical male twins discordant in sexual orientation. Researchers, however, noted and criticized the small sample size and questioned the statistical power of the study. Since 2014, Vilain has led the joint research unit between the French Centre National de la Recherche Scientifique (CNRS) called EpiDaPo (Epigenetics, Data, Politics), an interdisciplinary research unit which studies the societal effects of genetics, environment, and big data research. Vilain has been conducting global health research in the Democratic Republic of the Congo since 2018, mainly focusing on infectious diseases such as Ebola and genetic factors influencing diet-induced neurodegenerative diseases.
