= Salk (disambiguation) =

Jonas Salk (1914–1995) was the developer of the first effective polio vaccine.

Salk may also refer to:

- Designation for the inactivated (dead) poliovirus form of polio vaccine
- Lee Salk (1926–1992), psychologist and author
- Salk Institute for Biological Studies, a research institute in La Jolla, California, US
- Salk School of Science, middle school in Manhattan
- Salk Hall
- Salk Oval, sporting venue named after Jonas Salk

== See also ==
- SALC (disambiguation)
