= Caster Semenya =

South African middle-distance runner (born 1991)

Caster Semenya OIB
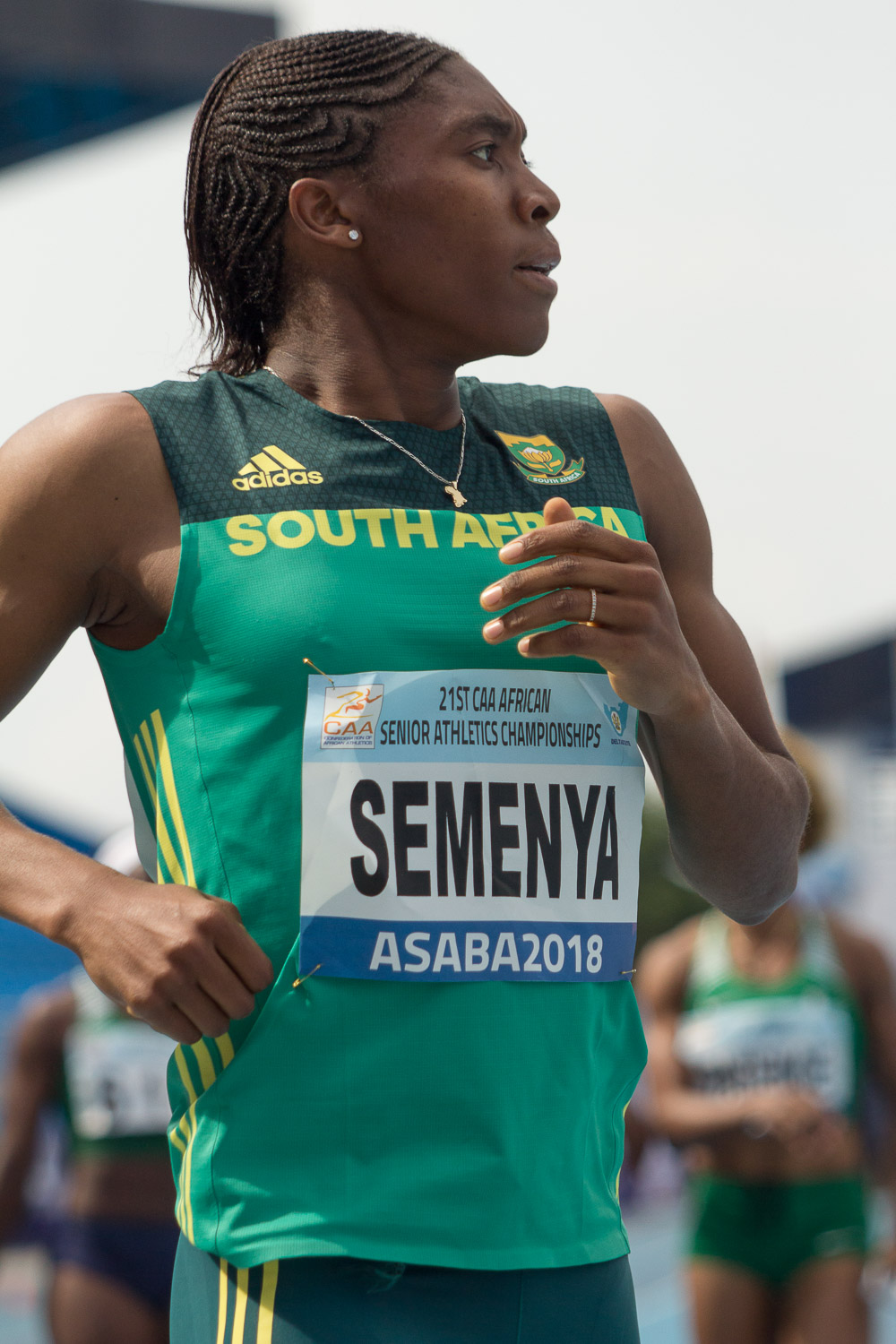
- Caster Semenya at the African Athletics Championships

Personal information
- Nationality: South African
- Born: 7 January 1991 (age 35) Pietersburg, Transvaal, (Note: Now Limpopo) South Africa
- Education: North-West University
- Height: 1.78 m (5 ft 10 in)
- Weight: 70 kg (154 lb)
Association football career
Senior career*
Years	Team	Apps	(Gls)
2019–present	JVW F.C.		
- * Club domestic league appearances and goals

Sport
- Sport: Running
- Events: 800 metres, 1500 metres
- Now coaching: Glenrose Xaba

Achievements and titles
- Personal bests: 400 m: 49.62 NR; 600 m: 1:21.77 NB; 800 m: 1:54.25 NR; 1000 m: 2:30.70 NR; 1500 m: 3:59.92 NR
Medal record
Women's athletics
Representing South Africa
Olympic Games
Gold medal – first place	2012 London	800 m
Gold medal – first place	2016 Rio de Janeiro	800 m
World Championships
Gold medal – first place	2009 Berlin	800 m
Gold medal – first place	2011 Daegu	800 m
Gold medal – first place	2017 London	800 m
Bronze medal – third place	2017 London	1500 m
Commonwealth Games
Gold medal – first place	2018 Gold Coast	800 m
Gold medal – first place	2018 Gold Coast	1500 m
African Games
Gold medal – first place	2015 Brazzaville	800 m
African Championships
Gold medal – first place	2016 Durban	800 m
Gold medal – first place	2016 Durban	1500 m
Gold medal – first place	2016 Durban	4 × 400 m relay
Gold medal – first place	2018 Asaba	400 m
Gold medal – first place	2018 Asaba	800 m
Representing Africa
Continental Cup
Gold medal – first place	2018 Ostrava	800 m
Silver medal – second place	2018 Ostrava	400 m
Silver medal – second place	2018 Ostrava	4 × 400 m mixed

Caster Semenya OIB (born 7 January 1991) is a South African middle-distance runner and winner of two Olympic gold medals, as well as three World Championships in the women's 800 metres. She first won gold at the World Championships in 2009 and went on to win at the 2016 Olympics and the 2017 World Championships, where she also won a bronze medal in the 1500 metres. After the doping disqualification of Mariya Savinova, she was also awarded gold medals for the 2011 World Championships and the 2012 Olympics.

Following Semenya's victory at the 2009 World Championships, she was made to undergo sex testing and cleared to return to competition the following year. The decision to perform sex testing sparked controversy in the sporting world and in Semenya's home country of South Africa. Later reports disclosed that Semenya has the condition 5α-Reductase 2 deficiency (5αR2D) and natural testosterone levels in the typical male range.

In 2019, new IAAF (World Athletics) rules came into force for athletes like Semenya with certain disorders of sex development (DSDs) requiring medication to suppress testosterone levels in order to participate in 400 m, 800 m, and 1500 m women's events. Semenya refused to undergo the treatment, which is now mandatory. She has filed a series of legal cases to restore her ability to compete in these events without testosterone suppression, arguing that the World Athletics rules are discriminatory.

== Early life and education ==
Semenya was born on 7 January 1991 in Ga-Masehlong, a village in South Africa near Polokwane, and grew up in the village of Fairlie in South Africa's northern Transvaal province (now Limpopo). She has three sisters and a brother. Semenya attended Nthema Secondary School and the University of North West as a sports science student. She began running as training for association football.

Although Semenya was assigned female at birth, she has the condition 5α-Reductase 2 deficiency (5-ARD). This condition only affects people with XY chromosomes. Individuals with 5-ARD have normal male internal structures that are not fully masculinised during the development of the reproductive system in utero, due to low levels of the hormone dihydrotestosterone (DHT). As a result, the external genitalia may appear ambiguous or female at birth.

Semenya said that she was born with a vagina and internal undescended testes but that she has no uterus or fallopian tubes and does not menstruate. Her internal testes produce natural testosterone levels in the typical male range. Semenya rejects the label of "intersex", calling herself "a different kind of woman".

External videos
- "Too Fast to Be a Woman The Story of Caster Semenya", Maxx Ginane
- "Dorcas and Caster Semenya", P&G
- "The problem with sex testing in sports", Vox

== Career ==
=== 2008 ===
In July, Semenya participated in the 2008 World Junior Championships in the 800 m and did not qualify for the finals. She won gold at the 2008 Commonwealth Youth Games with a time of 2:04.23.

=== 2009 ===
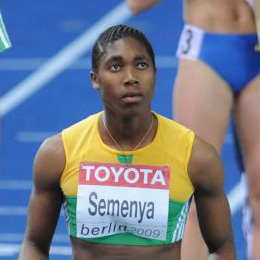
Semenya in 2009

In the African Junior Championships, Semenya won both the 800 m and 1500 m races with the times of 1:56.72 and 4:08.01, respectively. With that race she improved her 800 m personal best by seven seconds in less than nine months, including four seconds in that race alone. The 800 m time was the world leading time in 2009 at that date. It was also a national record and a championship record. Semenya simultaneously beat the Senior and Junior South African records held by Zelda Pretorius at 1:58.85, and Zola Budd at 2:00.90, respectively. In August 2009, Semenya won gold in the 800 metres at the World Championships with a time of 1:55.45 in the final, again setting the fastest time of the year. In December 2009, Track and Field News voted Semenya the Number One Women's 800-metre runner of the year.

=== Sex verification tests ===
Following her victory at the world championships, questions were raised about her sex. Having beaten her previous 800 m best by four seconds at the African Junior Championships just a month earlier, her quick improvements came under scrutiny. The combination of her rapid athletic progression and her appearance culminated in World Athletics (formerly called the IAAF) asking her to take a sex verification test to ascertain whether she was female.

The World Athletics said it was "obliged to investigate" after she made improvements of 25 seconds at 1500 m and eight seconds at 800 m – "the sort of dramatic breakthroughs that usually arouse suspicion of drug use". The sex test results were never published officially, but some results were leaked in the press and were widely discussed, resulting in at the time unverified claims about Semenya having an intersex trait. In November 2009, South Africa's sports ministry issued a statement that Semenya had reached an agreement with the IAAF to keep her medal and award. Eight months later, in July 2010, she was cleared again to compete in women's competitions.

==== Reaction ====
News that the IAAF requested the test broke three hours before the 2009 World Championships 800 m final. IAAF president Lamine Diack stated, "There was a leak of confidentiality at some point and this led to some insensitive reactions." The IAAF's handling of the case spurred many negative reactions. A number of athletes, including retired sprinter Michael Johnson, criticised the organisation for its response to the incident. There was additional outcry from South Africans, alleging undertones of European racism and imperialism embedded in the gender testing. Many local media reports highlighted these frustrations and challenged the validity of the tests with the belief that through Semenya's testing, members of the Global North did not want South Africans to excel.

The IAAF said it confirmed the requirement for a sex verification test after the news had already been reported in the media, denying charges of racism and expressing regret about "the allegations being made about the reasons for which these tests are being conducted". The federation also explained that the motivation for the test was not suspected cheating but a desire to determine whether she had a "rare medical condition" giving her an "unfair advantage". The president of the IAAF stated that the case could have been handled with more sensitivity.

On 7 September 2009, Wilfred Daniels, Semenya's coach with Athletics South Africa (ASA), resigned because he felt that ASA "did not advise Ms. Semenya properly". He apologised for personally having failed to protect her. ASA President Leonard Chuene admitted on 19 September 2009 to having subjected Semenya to testing. He had previously lied to Semenya about the purpose of the tests and to others about having performed the tests. He ignored a request from ASA team doctor Harold Adams to withdraw Semenya from the World Championships over concerns about the need to keep her medical records confidential.

Prominent South African civic leaders, commentators, politicians, and activists characterised the controversy as racist, as well as an affront to Semenya's privacy and human rights. On the recommendation of South Africa's Minister for Sport and Recreation, Makhenkesi Stofile, Semenya retained the legal firm Dewey & LeBoeuf, acting pro bono, "to make certain that her civil and legal rights and dignity as a person are fully protected". In an interview with South African magazine YOU Semenya stated, "God made me the way I am and I accept myself." Following the furore, Semenya received great support within South Africa, to the extent of being called a cause célèbre.

=== 2010 ===
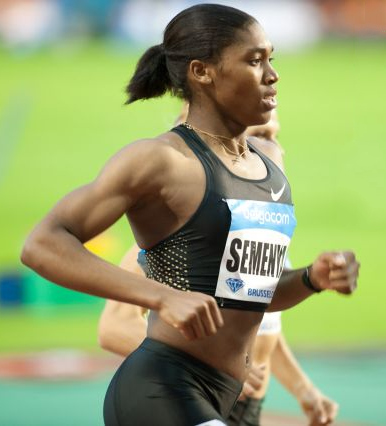
Semenya on the 2010 Diamond League circuit

In March 2010, Semenya was denied the opportunity to compete in the local Yellow Pages Series V Track and Field event in Stellenbosch, South Africa, because the IAAF had yet to release its findings from her sex test. On 6 July, the IAAF cleared Semenya to return to international competition. The results of the sex tests, however, were not released for privacy reasons. She returned to competition nine days later, winning two minor races in Finland.

On 22 August 2010, running on the same track as her World Championship victory, Semenya started slowly but finished strongly, dipping under 2:00 for the first time since the controversy, while winning the ISTAF meet in Berlin. Not being in full form, she did not enter the World Junior Championships or the African Championships, both held in July 2010, and opted to target the Commonwealth Games to be held in October 2010. She improved her season's best to 1:58.16 at the Notturna di Milano meeting in early September and returned to South Africa to prepare for the Commonwealth Games. Eventually, she was forced to skip the games due to an injury.

=== 2011 ===
After the controversy of the previous year, Semenya returned to action with a moderately low profile, running only 1:58.61 at the Bislett Games as her best prior to the World Championships. During the championships, she easily won her semi-final heat. In the final, she remained in the front of the pack leading into the final straightaway. While she separated from the rest of the field, Mariya Savinova followed her, then sprinted past Semenya before the finish line, leaving her to finish second. In 2017, Savinova was banned for doping and her results were disqualified, resulting in Semenya being awarded the gold medal.

=== 2012 Olympics ===
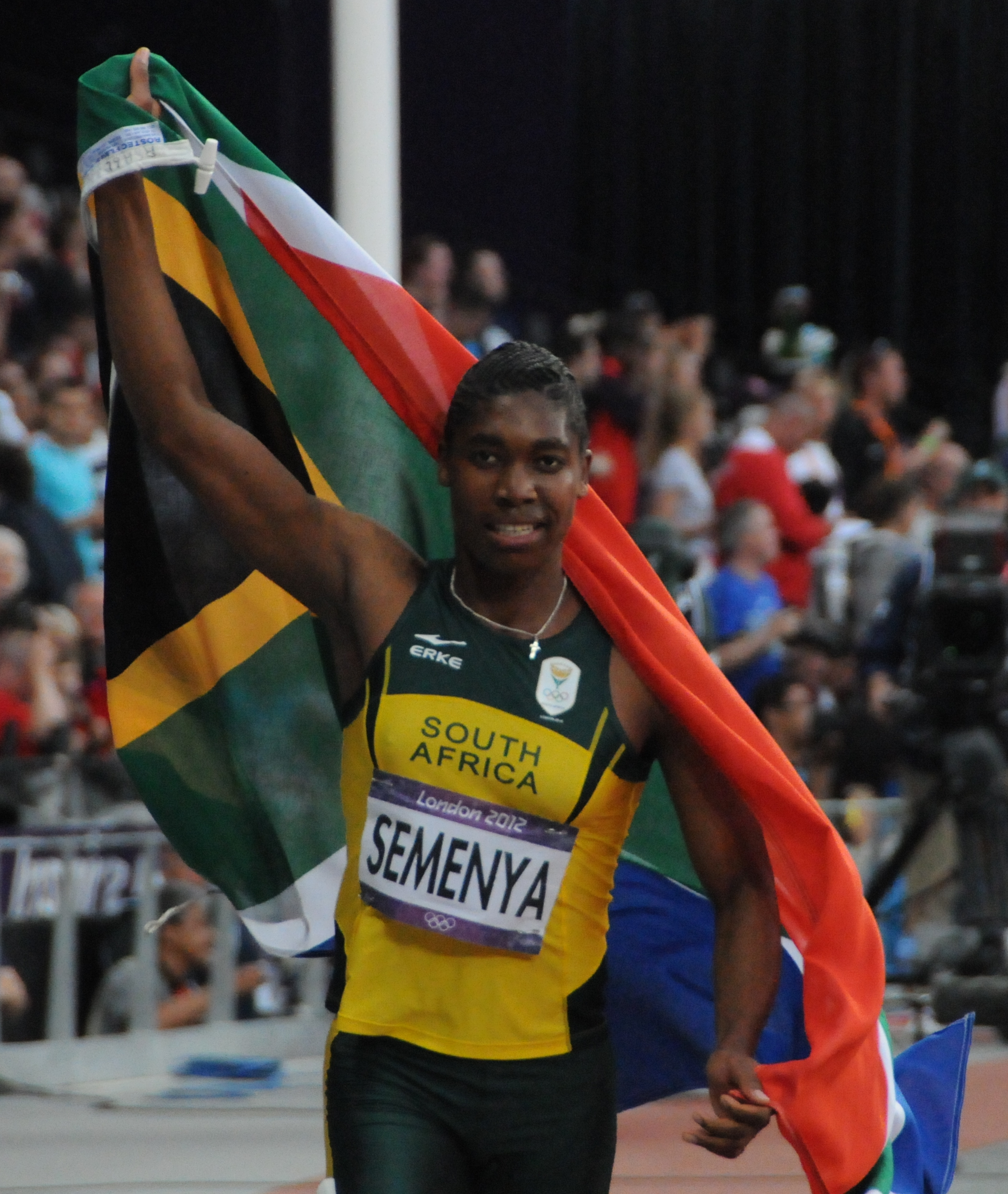
Caster Semenya at the 2012 Summer Olympics

Caster Semenya was chosen to carry the country's flag during the opening ceremony of the 2012 Summer Olympics. She later won a silver medal in the women's 800 metres of these games, with a time of 1:57.23 seconds, her season's best. She passed six competitors in the last 150 metres, but did not pass World Athletics champion Mariya Savinova of Russia, who took gold in a time of 1:56.19, finishing 1.04 seconds before Semenya. During the BBC coverage after the race, former British hurdler Colin Jackson raised the question whether Semenya had thrown the race, as the time that had been run was well within her capability, though in fact Semenya had at that point only once in her life run faster than Savinova's winning time, when winning the 2009 World Championships.

In November 2015, the World Anti-Doping Agency recommended Savinova and four other Russian athletes be given a lifetime ban for doping violations at the Olympics. On 10 February 2017, the Court of Arbitration for Sport (CAS) officially disqualified Savinova's results backdated to July 2010. The International Olympic Committee reallocated the London 2012 medals, and Semenya's silver was upgraded to gold.

=== 2015 testosterone rule change ===
The IAAF policy on high natural levels of testosterone in women, which had been in place since 2011, was suspended following the case of Dutee Chand v. Athletics Federation of India (AFI) & The International Association of Athletics Federations, in the Court of Arbitration for Sport, decided in July 2015. The ruling found that there was a lack of evidence provided that testosterone increased female athletic performance and notified the IAAF that it had two years to provide the evidence.

=== 2016 ===
On 16 April, Semenya became the first person to win all three of the 400 m, 800 m, and 1500 m titles at the South African National Championships, setting world leading marks of 50.74 and 1:58.45 in the first two events, and a 4:10.93 in the 1500 m, all within a nearly four-hour span of each other. On 16 July, she set a new national record for 800 metres of 1:55:33. On 20 August, she won the gold medal in the women's 800 metres at the 2016 Summer Olympics in Rio with a time of 1:55.28. The win reignited controversy over the rules on permissible testosterone levels; immediately after the race Lynsey Sharp, finishing sixth, broke into tears, having previously said that "everyone can see it's two separate races", while fifth-placed Joanna Jóźwik stated "I feel like the silver medalist ... I'm glad I'm the first European, the second white", to finish the race. Bioethicist Katrina Karkazis criticised the indignant response to Semenya's win as discriminatory. Semenya set a new personal best for the 400 m of 50.40 at the 2016 Memorial Van Damme track and field meet in Brussels.

=== 2017 ===
Semenya won the bronze medal in the 1500 metres at the 2017 World Championships held in London. She also won the gold medal in the women's 800m event.

=== 2018 testosterone rule change ===
In April 2018, the IAAF announced new rules effective 8 May 2019 that applied to athletes with certain disorders of sex development (DSDs) that result in androgen sensitivity and testosterone levels above 5 nmol/L. Under the new rules, these athletes would be required to take medication to lower their testosterone levels below the 5 nmol/L threshold for at least six months in order to compete in the female classification for certain events.

In a report explaining its decision, the IAAF wrote that there was a "broad medical and scientific consensus" that athletes with high testosterone can "significantly enhance their sporting potential" due to greater muscle mass, strength, and haemoglobin levels. The report added that "there is no other genetic or biological trait encountered in female athletics that confers such a huge performance advantage." The IAAF's changes applied to eight different events—including the 400 m, 800 m, and 1500 m, which Semenya regularly competed in. Sports scientist Ross Tucker estimated that the new rules could make Semenya "five to seven seconds slower over 800 metres." Female athletes without a DSD are not subject to any testosterone limits.

=== 2019 football career ===
In September 2019, Semenya joined the South African SAFA Sasol Women's League football club JVW owned by Janine van Wyk.

=== Tokyo 2020 Olympics ===
In 2020, Semenya announced that she had decided to switch to the 200 meters for the 2020 Tokyo Olympics, in order to avoid the 400 m to one mile ban. In order to qualify for the 200 meters, Semenya would have needed to achieve the qualifying time of 22.80. She had previously won the 5000 m at the South African championship in 2019. On 15 April 2021, Semenya confirmed she would not try to make the Tokyo 2020 200 m qualifying standard. On 28 May 2021, Semenya ran a personal best of 15:32.15 in the 5000m, 22 seconds slower than the necessary time to be allowed to compete at the Olympics.

=== 2022 World Championships ===
Semenya ran in the 5000 meter race at the 2022 World Athletics Championships in Eugene, Oregon. It was her first major international competition since 2017. She finished almost a minute behind first place in her heat of the semifinals, and did not advance to the finals.

== Legal cases against World Athletics ==
In June 2018, Semenya announced that she would legally challenge the IAAF rules, calling them "discriminatory, irrational, [and] unjustifiable". She claimed that testosterone-suppressing medication, which she had taken from 2010 to 2015, had made her feel "constantly sick" and caused her abdominal pain, and that the IAAF had used her as a "guinea pig" to test the medication's effects. The case divided both legal and scientific commentators. Duke Law School professor and former middle-distance runner Doriane Lambelet Coleman argued that the organization's rules guaranteed a "protected space" for female athletes. Physician and genetics researcher Eric Vilain argued in favor of Semenya, claiming that "sex is not defined by one particular parameter ... it's so difficult to exclude women who've always lived their entire lives as women." During the proceedings, the IAAF clarified that the regulations would only apply to DSD athletes with XY chromosomes.

In May 2019, the Court of Arbitration for Sport (CAS) rejected Semenya's challenge in a 2–1 decision, paving the way for the new rules to come into effect. Although the CAS agreed with Semenya that the rules were discriminatory, it concluded that this discrimination was "a necessary, reasonable and proportionate means of achieving the IAAF's aim of preserving the integrity of female athletics". That same month, Semenya appealed the decision to the Federal Supreme Court of Switzerland. The court provisionally suspended the World Athletics rules while deciding whether to issue an interlocutory injunction in June; however, this decision was reversed in July, leaving Semenya unable to compete in World Athletics races between 400m and one mile while her appeal continued.

The Swiss supreme court ultimately dismissed Semenya's appeal in September 2020. In its decision, the court affirmed that the CAS had the right to uphold World Athletics' rules "in order to guarantee fair competition for certain running disciplines in female athletics." The court also declared that because Semenya was "free to refuse treatment to lower testosterone levels", her "guarantee of human dignity" was not violated. In February 2021, Semenya appealed the case to the European Court of Human Rights (ECtHR). In March 2023, World Athletics made its rules for Semenya and other DSD athletes even more restrictive, requiring them to lower their testosterone levels below a threshold of 2.5 nmol/L for at least 24 months before competing. The ECtHR ruled in Semenya's favor in a 4–3 decision in July 2023, finding that the competition rules had discriminated against her and infringed on her human rights; however, the decision did not overturn the rules themselves, and World Athletics stated that the regulations would "remain in place".

After a request from the Swiss government, Semenya's case was referred to the Grand Chamber of the ECtHR in November 2023 for a final ruling. On 10 July 2025, in a 15–2 vote, the Grand Chamber of the ECtHR upheld the 2023 decision of the Swiss Federal Tribunal, finding that Semenya's appeal against World Athletics' regulations for athletes with differences of sexual development "had not been properly heard". Four of the 17 judges, including the chamber president Marko Bošnjak from Slovenia, filed a partial dissent to the majority opinion and argued that the ECtHR should have been able to pronounce on "substantive conclusions" reached by the CAS. The judges wrote that as World Athletics eligibility rules "specifically targeted the applicant, since they concerned only the events in which she competed", the fact that they "amounted to a kind of 'lex Semenya' clearly demonstrates the arbitrariness of those regulations as a whole", expressing their disappointment that "her expectations have not been met". Kaajal Ramjathan-Keogh, a South African lawyer with the International Commission of Jurists argued that she was being asked to "conform to an arbitrary and subjective standard of femininity." Semenya, who has since turned to coaching and is not seeking a return to competition, stated she would continue to fight on behalf of other DSD athletes.

== Competition record ==
Representing South Africa
Year	Competition	Venue	Position	Event	Notes
2008; 800m world rank: NR	World Junior Championships	Bydgoszcz, Poland	7th (h)	800 m	2:11.98
2008; 800m world rank: NR	Commonwealth Youth Games	Pune, India	1st	800 m	2:04.23 GR
2009; 800m world rank: 1st	South African Championships	Stellenbosch, South Africa	1st	800 m	2:03.16
2009; 800m world rank: 1st	South African Championships	Stellenbosch, South Africa	2nd	1500 m	4:16.43
2009; 800m world rank: 1st	South African U18/U20 Championships	Pretoria, South Africa	1st	800 m	2:02.00
2009; 800m world rank: 1st	South African U18/U20 Championships	Pretoria, South Africa	1st	1500 m	4:25.70
2009; 800m world rank: 1st	African Junior Championships	Bambous, Mauritius	1st	800 m	1:56.72 NR CR
2009; 800m world rank: 1st	African Junior Championships	Bambous, Mauritius	1st	1500 m	4:08.01
2009; 800m world rank: 1st	IAAF World Championships	Berlin, Germany	1st	800 m	1:55.45
IAAF formalizes testosterone policy
2011; 800m world rank: 2nd	South African Championships	Durban, South Africa	1st	800 m	2:02.10
2011; 800m world rank: 2nd	South African Championships	Durban, South Africa	1st	1500 m	4:12.93
2011; 800m world rank: 2nd	South African Championships	Durban, South Africa	1st	4 × 400 m	3:41.30
2011; 800m world rank: 2nd	IAAF World Championships	Daegu, South Korea	1st	800 m	1:56.35 (Note: In the 2011 World Championships and the 2012 Olympic Games, Semenya finished 2nd to Mariya Savinova, but Savinova was later disqualified due to failing an antidoping test, promoting Semenya to the gold medal in both races.)
2012; 800m world rank: 5th	South African Championships	Port Elizabeth, South Africa	1st	800 m	2:02.68
2012; 800m world rank: 5th	South African Championships	Port Elizabeth, South Africa	1st	4 × 400 m	3:36.92
2012; 800m world rank: 5th	Olympic Games	London, United Kingdom	1st	800 m	1:57.23
2014; 800m world rank: NR	South African Championships	Pretoria, South Africa	1st	800 m	2:03.05
2015; 800m world rank: NR	South African Championships	Stellenbosch, South Africa	1st	800 m	2:05.05
2015; 800m world rank: NR	South African Championships	Stellenbosch, South Africa	8th	1500 m	4:29.60
2015; 800m world rank: NR	IAAF World Championships	Beijing, China	8th (h)	800 m	2:03.18
2015; 800m world rank: NR	All-Africa Games	Brazzaville, Congo	1st	800 m	2:00.97
2015; 800m world rank: NR	All-Africa Games	Brazzaville, Congo	8th	1500 m	4:23.00
Court of Arbitration in Sport temporarily lifts testosterone regulations
2016; 800m world rank: 1st	South African Championships	Stellenbosch, South Africa	1st	400 m	50.74
2016; 800m world rank: 1st	South African Championships	Stellenbosch, South Africa	1st	800 m	1:58.45
2016; 800m world rank: 1st	South African Championships	Stellenbosch, South Africa	1st	1500 m	4:10.91
2016; 800m world rank: 1st	African Championships	Durban, South Africa	1st	1500 m	4:01.99
2016; 800m world rank: 1st	African Championships	Durban, South Africa	1st	800 m	1:58.20
2016; 800m world rank: 1st	African Championships	Durban, South Africa	1st	4 × 400 m	3:28.49
2016; 800m world rank: 1st	Olympic Games	Rio de Janeiro, Brazil	1st	800 m	1:55.28 NR
2017; 800m world rank: 1st	South African Championships	Potchefstroom, South Africa	1st	400 m	51.60
2017; 800m world rank: 1st	South African Championships	Potchefstroom, South Africa	1st	800 m	2:01.03
2017; 800m world rank: 1st	IAAF World Championships	London, United Kingdom	3rd	1500 m	4:02.90
2017; 800m world rank: 1st	IAAF World Championships	London, United Kingdom	1st	800 m	1:55.16
IAAF reinstates testosterone rules
2018; 800m world rank: 1st	South African Championships	Pretoria, South Africa	1st	1500 m	4:10.68
2018; 800m world rank: 1st	South African Championships	Pretoria, South Africa	1st	800 m	1:57.80
2018; 800m world rank: 1st	Commonwealth Games	Gold Coast, Australia	1st	1500 m	4:00.71 GR
2018; 800m world rank: 1st	Commonwealth Games	Gold Coast, Australia	1st	800 m	1:56.68 GR
2018; 800m world rank: 1st	African Championships	Asaba, Nigeria	1st	400 m	49.96
2018; 800m world rank: 1st	African Championships	Asaba, Nigeria	1st	800 m	1:56.06 CR
2019	South African Championships	Germiston, South Africa	1st	5000 m	16:05.97
2019	South African Championships	Germiston, South Africa	1st	1500 m	4:13.59
2022	World Athletics Championships	Eugene, Oregon	13th in semifinals	5000 m	15:46.12

== Works ==
- Semenya, Caster (31 October 2023). The Race to Be Myself. W. W. Norton. ISBN 978-1-324-03577-0.

== Personal life and honours ==
In 2010, the British magazine New Statesman included Semenya in its annual list of "50 People That Matter" for unintentionally instigating "an international and often ill-tempered debate on gender politics, feminism, and race, becoming an inspiration to gender campaigners around the world". In 2012, Semenya was awarded South African Sportswoman of the Year Award at the SA Sports Awards in Sun City. Semenya received the bronze Order of Ikhamanga on 27 April 2014, as part of Freedom Day festivities. Semenya married her long-term partner, Violet Raseboya, in December 2015 (traditional ceremony) and January 2017 (civil ceremony). They have two daughters: one born in 2019 and another in 2022. Their first daughter was conceived through artificial insemination.

In October 2016, the IAAF announced that Semenya was shortlisted for women's 2016 World Athlete of the Year. Semenya was named one of Time magazine's 100 Most Influential People of 2019. Semenya was one of the athletes whose cases were profiled in Phyllis Ellis's 2022 documentary film Category: Woman. On 31 October 2023, Semenya's memoir, The Race to Be Myself, was published by #Merky Books (an imprint of Penguin Random House UK). In The Guardian, Emma John wrote that Semenya's "timely, sometimes angry memoir inspires compassion" while acknowledging that it presented mainly her side of the controversy about her running career. The book was named a New York Times Book Review Editors' Choice in December 2023.

== See also ==
- Dutee Chand
- Imane Khelif
- Ewa Kłobukowska
- Maria José Martínez-Patiño
- Francine Niyonsaba
- Santhi Soundarajan
- Margaret Wambui
- List of intersex Olympians

== Notes ==
Olympic Games
Preceded by Oliver Kraas	Flagbearer for South Africa; London 2012	Succeeded by Wayde van Niekerk
Awards
Preceded by (Poland) Anita Włodarczyk	Women's Track & Field Athlete of the Year; 2018	Succeeded by (United States) Dalilah Muhammad
