= South African Police Service v Southern African Human Rights Litigation Centre =

South African legal case

- Court: Constitutional Court of South Africa
- Full case name: National Commissioner of the South African Police Service v Southern African Human Rights Litigation Centre and Another
- Decided: 30 October 2014
- Docket nos.: CCT 02/14
- Citations: [2014] ZACC 30; 2015 (1) SA 315 (CC); 2015 (1) SACR 255 (CC); 2014 (12) BCLR 1428 (CC)

Case history
- Prior actions: National Commissioner of the South African Police Service v Southern African Human Rights Litigation Centre [2013] ZASCA 168 in the Supreme Court of Appeal; Southern African Litigation Centre v National Director of Public Prosecutions [2012] ZAGPPHC 61 in the High Court of South Africa, Gauteng Division

Court membership
- Judges sitting: Mogoeng CJ, Moseneke DCJ, Cameron J, Froneman J, Jafta J, Khampepe J, Madlanga J, van der Westhuizen J, Zondo J and Majiedt AJ

Case opinions
- Decision by: Majiedt AJ (unanimous)

National Commissioner of The South African Police Service v Southern African Human Rights Litigation Centre and Another, sometimes known as the torture docket case, is a 2014 decision of the Constitutional Court of South Africa on universal jurisdiction in international criminal law. The court held unanimously that the South African state was obligated, both under South African law and under international law, to prosecute the international crime of torture. However, that obligation was limited by the requirements of subsidiarity, complementarity, and practicality.

The case arose from credible allegations that Zimbabwean officials had tortured members of the Movement for Democratic Change inside Zimbabwe in 2007. The two respondents, the Southern African Human Rights Litigation Centre and the Zimbabwean Exiles' Forum, had laid suit after the acting National Director of Public Prosecutions, Mokotedi Mpshe, informed them that the National Prosecuting Authority did not intend to investigate the allegations.

The matter was initially heard as Southern African Litigation Centre v National Director of Public Prosecutions in the North Gauteng High Court, where Judge Hans Fabricius ruled in the non-profits' favour on 8 May 2012. It was then appealed unsuccessfully to the Supreme Court of Appeal, where the High Court's ruling was upheld by Judge of Appeal Mahomed Navsa on 27 November 2013. Finally, the National Commissioner of the South African Police Service (SAPS) appealed to the Constitutional Court, where the matter was heard on 19 May 2014 and decided on 30 October 2014. Jeremy Gauntlett SC represented the National Commissioner and Wim Trengove SC represented the non-profit respondents.

In May 2020, the Mail & Guardian reported that South African law enforcement had been slow to implement the court's order.
