= The Race to Be Myself =

2023 memoir by Caster Semenya

- First edition cover
- Author: Caster Semenya
- Publisher: W. W. Norton & Company
- Publication date: October 31, 2023
- ISBN: 978-1324035770

The Race to Be Myself is a 2023 memoir by South African middle-distance runner Caster Semenya. The book details Semenya's running career and her legal fights following World Athletics' 2018 rulings barring her and other female athletes with testosterone levels beyond certain thresholds from competing in certain women's running events, as well as her personal life and childhood.

An adapted version for young readers was published on May 28, 2024.

== Summary ==
The Race to Be Myself covers Semenya's life, including her childhood in Limpopo, her running career, and her relationship with her eventual wife Violet Raseboya. A major element of the memoir is the events after Semenya, then 18 years old, won the Women's 800 metres race at the World Championships in 2009, where she was subjected to a sex verification test and learned she has 5α-Reductase 2 deficiency, causing her to have testosterone levels in what is typically considered the male range. It further recounts the competitive ban on Semenya following World Athletics' 2018 ruling regarding testosterone levels for female athletes and Semenya's subsequent legal fights aiming to allow herself and other athletes affected by the decision to compete.

== Reception ==
Kirkus Reviews concluded that The Race to Be Myself was a "moving, inspiring testimony." A review of the young readers' edition, while critical of a lack of cohesion in the early sections of book, positively commented on its "intimate, loose, conversational tone." Reviewing the audiobook adaption narrated largely by Becky Motumo-Molete, they remarked that despite Motumo-Molete's voice being audibly different from Semenya's, "her graceful performance channels the same resoluteness and stoic authenticity that Semenya does."

Publishers Weekly called the book a "chronicle of supreme resilience," stating it would appeal even to readers uninterested in sports.

Library Journal gave the book a starred review. It was also included in Library Journal's list of the best memoirs and biographies of 2023.

School Library Journal gave the young readers edition a starred review.

The Race to Be Myself was shortlisted for the non-fiction category for the 2024 Sunday Times CNA Literary Awards, while the young readers edition was included in Rise: A Feminist Book Project's Top Ten of 2025.
