= Symmetry-adapted linear combination =

Symmetry-adapted linear combination may refer to:

- The linear combination of atomic orbitals in the subject of molecular orbitals
- Configuration state function, the linear combination of Slater determinants
- Orbital hybridization, the linear combination of orbitals on the same atom in valence bond theory
- Resonance (chemistry), the linear combination of contributing structures in valence bond theory
