= Kaajal Ramjathan-Keogh =

South African human rights lawyer

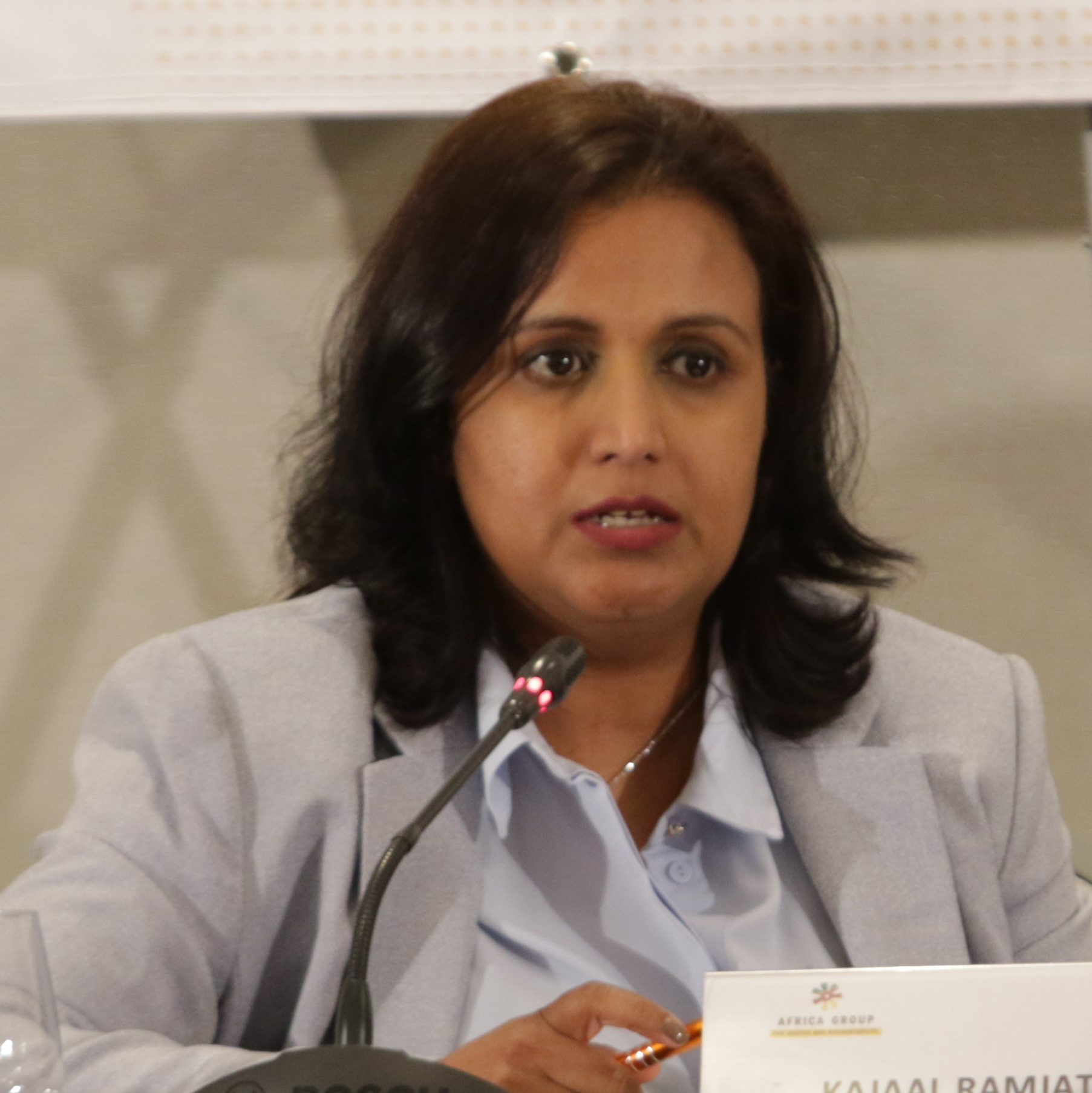
- Occupation: Lawyer
- Employer: Southern Africa Litigation Centre

Kaajal Ramjathan-Keogh is a South African lawyer who led the Southern Africa Litigation Centre from 2015 to 2020. She was involved in the failed arrest of Sudanese President Omar Al Bashir when he visited South Africa in 2015.

== Biography ==
Ramjathan-Keogh studied law at the University of Kwa Zulu Natal in South Africa.

She was in charge of the Refugee and Migrants Rights Programme at Lawyers for Human Rights, which she joined in 2002. The refugees were from the Democratic Republic of the Congo, Somalia, Sudan, and Rwanda, and the legal issues that the women had been involved in included discrimination, torture and rape.

Ramjathan-Keogh led the Johannesburg-based Southern Africa Litigation Centre from 2015. And until 2020. The centre focused on women's issues.

During the Africa Union Summit in South Africa in 2015, Ramjathan-Keogh led the court application to have Sudanese President Omar Al Bashir arrested for war crimes while he visited South Africa. He was allowed to leave the country despite a claim from the International Criminal Court (ICC). South Africa considered leaving the ICC. In 2016, South Africa's Supreme Court ruled that the failure to detain Al Bashir was "disgraceful". Ramjathan-Keogh noted that he could never enter the country again without being arrested.

In 2018, Ramjathan-Keogh and Bonita Maeyersfeld lodged their appeal to be heard at the International Criminal Court concerning the arrest of Al Bashir. In 2019, Al Bashir was ousted from power and placed in a Sudanese high security prison.

Ramjathan-Keogh chaired the board of the International Detention Coalition when its executive director was Carolina Gottardo.

In 2023, Ramjathan-Keogh was consulted with, when the South African government appeared to briefly leave the ICC. Commentators reported that this had been done in the mistaken belief that this would allow Vladimir Putin to visit the country. Putin would, however, be arrest-able because ICC members are required to comply with ICC instructions for a year after leaving membership.
