= Naomie Pilula =

Zambian lawyer, human rights advocate, and social media personality

- Born: September 26, 1987 (age 39); Zambia
- Education: University of Zambia; University of Queensland; University of Auckland; University of London (LLM candidate, Financial Services Law)
- Alma mater: University of Zambia
- Occupations: Corporate lawyer, human rights advocate, social media personality
- Years active: 2010s–present
- Employer(s): In-house legal counsel and legislative drafting institutions (financial services and fintech)
- Known for: Advocacy for self-acceptance and body positivity; viral social media activism (2025)

Naomie Pilula (September 26, 1987) is a Zambian corporate lawyer, human rights advocate, and content creator on beauty and fashion who gained attention for her advocacy of self-acceptance and body positivity.

== Personal life and advocacy ==
Naomie is a Zambian being the youngest of seven children. While growing up, she built her career in law and finance. She gained attention in late 2025 after sharing a regular selfie on Instagram about her natural hair and skin care on June 22, 2025, which went viral with over 500,000 shares and comments, including cyberbullying and cruel comments about her physical features, specifically suggesting she needed a nose job, prompting her to start talking about self-love. Naomie refused to be brought down by criticism, including deleting her photo, but rather stood her ground and responded that her nose is a feature inherited from her father and instead released a personal statement which says:

"I am not an aesthetically beautiful person. I’m not, and that’s okay. But I love myself, and I can be myself. And with that comes a certain level of beauty, because there is a light that everyone has, and that deserves to shine."

This led to her story being picked up by global media outlets, including People Magazine, resulting in recognition for her fight against cyberbullying. Her story was further amplified by platforms such as TheGrio and OkayAfrica. This led to massive follower growth on Instagram from roughly 1,000 followers to over 200,000, as people rallied behind her message. Naomie has since used her platform to discuss beauty standards and self-esteem on media programs, including a featured spot on the Nkwazi Unfiltered podcast.

== Education ==
She pursues advanced legal training and works toward her Master's in Financial Services Law from the University of London. She also studied at the University of Queensland in Brisbane, Australia, and at the University of Auckland in New Zealand. She also studied at the University of Zambia.

== Career ==
She works for in-house legal counsel and legislative drafters who specialise in financial services regulation and fintech law in Zambia.

== See also ==
- Mahlagha Jaberi
- Instagram tourism
- Leah Halton
