= Southern African Litigation Centre v National Director of Public Prosecutions =

South African court case

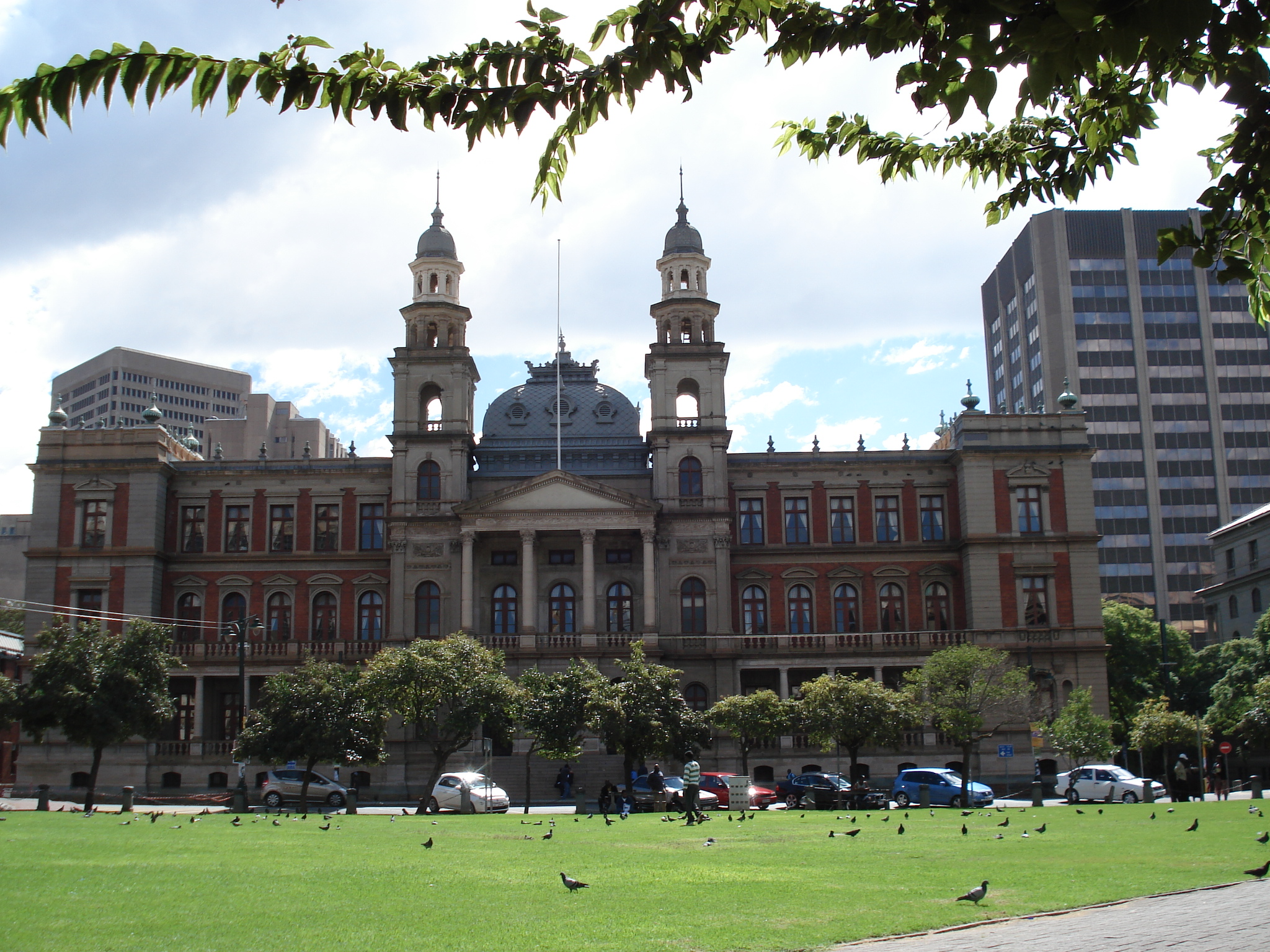
- Court: North Gauteng High Court
- Full case name: Southern African Litigation Centre and Another v National Director of Public Prosecutions and Others
- Decided: 8 May 2012
- Docket nos.: 77150/09
- Citations: [2012] ZAGPPHC 61; 2012 (10) BCLR 1089 (GNP); 2012 (3) All SA 198 (GNP)

Case history
- Appealed to: National Commissioner of the South African Police Service v Southern African Human Rights Litigation Centre [2013] ZASCA 168 in the Supreme Court of Appeal
- Subsequent action: South African Police Service v Southern African Human Rights Litigation Centre [2014] ZACC 30 in the Constitutional Court

Court membership
- Judge sitting: Fabricius J

Southern African Litigation Centre and Another v National Director of Public Prosecutions and Others was decided in the North Gauteng High Court on 8 May 2012. It concerned South Africa's obligations under international law and, in particular, under the Rome Statute of the International Criminal Court Act.

== Background ==
In March 2007 Zimbabwe police raided Harvest House, the headquarters of the political opposition the Movement for Democratic Change, and detained and tortured scores of people. After hearing about this incident Johannesburg-based NGO the Southern African Litigation Centre (SALC) documented the torture and set out the legal landscape in a detailed dossier which was submitted to the Priority Crimes Litigation Unit in the National Prosecuting Authority (NPA). The document maintained that because the evidence supported the conclusion that the torture was widespread and systematic it should be regarded as a crime against humanity. SALC requested that the South African prosecuting and police services initiate an investigation into the torture, and argued that South Africa's domestic and international obligations in respect of international crimes compelled the authorities to do so.

The South African Implementation of the Rome Statute of the International Criminal Court Act (the ICC Act) had been enacted to give effect to the country's obligations as a signatory to the Rome Statute of the International Criminal Court, and so to enable South African courts to try perpetrators of international crimes as set out in the Rome Statute. The ICC Act empowers South Africa authorities to investigate and prosecute persons accused of committing crimes against humanity, genocide and war crimes if the perpetrator is present in South Africa, even if the perpetrator is not South African and the crimes were not committed on South African territory. The SALC dossier stated that the Zimbabwean officials suspected of committing the torture regularly travelled to South Africa and so the country had jurisdiction under the ICC Act to investigate them.

In June 2009 the NPA informed SALC that the South African authorities – the NPA and the South African Police Service (SAPS) – had taken the decision not to investigate the allegations contained in the dossier.

== Litigation ==
SALC and the Zimbabwe Exiles Forum (ZEF) launched review proceedings in the North Gauteng High Court, requesting the court to review and set aside the decision not to investigate on the basis that the authorities had failed to properly consider SALC's request and that by refusing to investigate they were not giving effect to their obligations under the ICC Act and international criminal law.

The case was heard from 26–29 March 2012 at the North Gauteng High Court, presided over by Judge Hans Fabricius.

== Judgment ==
Judge Fabricius found in favour of SALC and ZEF and held that the decision taken by the NPA and the SAPS not to initiate an investigation into the allegations of torture committed by Zimbabwean officials was “unlawful, inconsistent with the Constitution and therefore invalid.” The Judge set aside the decision and ordered that the South African authorities work together in reassessing SALC's request for an investigation.

== Significance ==
This case was the first case brought before a South African court involving the interpretation of the ICC Act, and so was the first judgment to give content to the authorities’ obligations under that legislation.

The judgment confirmed that the ICC Act and international criminal law conferred obligations on South African authorities to investigate and prosecute perpetrators of international crimes. Judge Fabricius held that this obligation is not limited to crimes that were committed in South Africa territory.

== Further developments ==
The NPA and the SAPS applied for leave to appeal the judgment, which was refused by the North Gauteng High Court. The authorities then petitioned the Supreme Court of Appeal (SCA) which referred the application for oral argument, following which the SCA will decide whether it will hear the merits of the appeal. Dates for the oral argument have not yet been allocated.
