= 2023 Belgian Athletics Championships =

- Dates: 29–30 July
- Host city: Bruges, Belgium
- Venue: Sportcentrum Julien Saelens

The 2023 Belgian Athletics Championships (Dutch: Belgische kampioenschappen atletiek 2023, French: Championnats de Belgique d'athlétisme 2023) was the year's national outdoor track and field championships for Belgium. It was held from 29 to 30 July at the Sportcentrum Julien Saelens in Bruges. The national championships in 10,000 metres took place on 29 April in Huizingen.

== Results ==
=== Men ===
Event	Gold		Silver		Bronze	
100 metres	Kobe Vleminckx	10.32	Ward Merckx	10.34	Valentijn Hoornaert	10.46
200 metres	Antoine Snyders	21.24	Amine Kasmi	21.29	Julien Watrin	21.33
400 metres	Alexander Doom	45.83	Florent Mabille	46.34	Robin Vanderbemden	46.53
800 metres	Eliott Crestan	1:46.90	Pieter Sisk	1:47.18	Tibo De Smet	1:47.37
1500 metres	Ruben Verheyden	3:41.78	Ismael Debjani	3:41.84	Jochem Vermeulen	3:42.07
5000 metres	Isaac Kimeli	13:25.56	John Heymans	13:27.06	Robin Hendrix	13:34.30
10,000 metres	Enzo Noel	29:15.54	Steven Casteele	30:18.02	Noah Konteh	30:21.30
110 m hurdles	Michael Obasuyi	13.57	Nolan Vancauwemberghe	13.66	François Grailet	13.82
400 m hurdles	Wout Bex	52.81	Dries Peeters	53.01	Mimoun Abdoul Wahab	53.64
3000 m s'chase	Clement Deflandre	8:41.03	Remi Schyns	8:43.17	Tim Van de Velde	8:53.92
Long jump	Yanni Sampson	7.40 m (+1.9 m/s)	Giebe Algoet	7.21 m (+2.1 m/s)	Jeroen Gonnissen	7.18 m (+1.9 m/s)
Triple jump	Björn De Decker	14.87 m (+2.6 m/s)	Désiré Kingunza	14.85 m (+2.4 m/s)	Gregory Geerts	14.39 m (+0.8 m/s)
High jump	Thomas Carmoy	2.20 m	Giebe Algoet	2.15 m	Lars Van Looy	2.13 m
Pole vault	Ben Broeders	5.72 m	Thomas Van Nuffelen	5.20 m	Lukas Urbanczyk	5.10 m
Shot put	Andreas De Lathauwer	17.08 m	Kwinten Cools	16.47 m	Kasper Verbeylen	15.69 m
Discus throw	Philip Milanov	64.15 m	Leander Casteels	54.25 m	Lars Coene	53.52 m
Javelin throw	Timothy Herman	80.26 m	Cedric Sorgeloos	70.55 m	Ides Verhulst	64.00 m
Hammer throw	Rémi Malengreaux	61.41 m	Devlin Neyens	58.87 m	Orry Willems	58.40 m

=== Women ===
Event	Gold		Silver		Bronze	
100 metres	Delphine Nkansa	11.03	Mariam Oulare	11.19	Alizée Morency Poilvach	11.34
200 metres	Mariam Oulare	23.56	Imke Vervaet	23.95	Lotte De Foer	24.66
400 metres	Helena Ponette	52.26	Naomi Van Den Broeck	52.61	Cloë Van der Meulen	54.72
800 metres	Camille Laus	2:05.35	Vanessa Scaunet	2:06.95	Annelies Nijssen	2:07.33
1500 metres	Elise Vanderelst	4:11.66	Mariska Parewyck	4:17.83	Marie Bilo	4:20.63
5000 metres	Lisa Rooms	15:51.27	Chloé Herbiet	16:01.97	Victoria Warpy	16:19.01
10,000 metres	Jana Van Lent	34:14.95	Anne Schreurs	35:10.30	Yewbdar Denys	35:16.50
100 m hurdles	Yanla Ndjip-Nyemeck	13.09	Anne Zagré	13.13	Amber Vanden Bosch	13.64
400 m hurdles	Nina Hespel	57.44	Kylie Lambert	57.88	Ilana Hanssens	57.96
3000 m s'chase	Rhune Vanroose	10:34.76	Eline Dalemans	10:40.13	Elia Cappa	11:05.76
Long jump	Sennah Vanhoeijen	6.06 m (+0.8 m/s)	Maité Beernaert	6.04m (+3.8 m/s)	Bo Brasseur	6.02 m (+0.9 m/s)
Triple jump	Ilona Masson	13.40 m (+2.9 m/s)	Saliyya Guisse	12.59 m (+4.5 m/s)	Elsa Loureiro	12.28 m (+2.7 m/s)
High jump	Merel Maes	1.80 m	Zita Goossens	1.77 m	Yorunn Ligneel	1.74 m
Pole vault	Elien Vekemans	4.40 m	Fleur Hooyberghs	4.00 m	Lola Lepère	4.00 m
Shot put	Jolien Boumkwo	16.53 m	Elena Defrère	15.01 m	Noor Vidts	13.99 m
Discus throw	Babette Vandeput	54.98 m	Jihane Mrabet	50.11 m	Anouska Hellebuyck	50.04 m
Javelin throw	Nafissatou Thiam	51.95 m	Pauline Smal	49.29 m	Cassandre Evans	43.27 m
Hammer throw	Vanessa Sterckendries	66.11 m	Jolien Boumkwo	63.25 m	Ilke Lagrou	56.80 m
