= 2022 Belgian Athletics Championships =

- Dates: 24–26 June
- Host city: Gentbrugge, Belgium
- Venue: Wouter Weylandt Atletiekstadion

The 2022 Belgian Athletics Championships (Dutch: Belgische kampioenschappen atletiek 2022, French: Championnats de Belgique d'athlétisme 2022) was the year's national outdoor track and field championships for Belgium. It was held from 26 to 27 June at the Wouter Weylandt Atletiekstadion in Gentbrugge. The national championships in 10,000 metres took place on 30 April in Malmedy.

== Results ==
=== Men ===
Event	Gold		Silver		Bronze	
100 metres	Kobe Vleminckx	10.25	Ward Merckx	10.36	Simon Verherstraeten	10.49
200 metres	Dylan Borlée	21.19	Robin Vanderbemden	21.25	Amine Kasmi	21.41
400 metres	Alexander Doom	45.36	Kevin Borlée	46.04	Jonas De Smet	46.71
800 metres	Tibo De Smet	1:45.32	Aurèle Vandeputte	1:45.65	Tarik Moukrime	1:48.15
1500 metres	Ruben Verheyden	3:38.11	Jochem Vermeulen	3:39.01	Stijn Baeten	3:41.44
5000 metres	Ismael Debjani	13:33.04	Michael Somers	13:33.92	Ward D'Hoore	14:04.46
10,000 metres	Lahsene Bouchikhi	29:06.96	Pierre Denays	30:10.24	Valentin Poncelet	30:12.54
110 m hurdles	Nolan Vancauwemberghe	14.08	Senne Segers	14.44	Jente Hauttekeete	14.50
400 m hurdles	Dries Van Nieuwenhove	49.56	Robin Van Damme	50.86	Dylan Owusu	51.11
3000 m s'chase	Remi Schyns	8:50.40	Pieter-Jan Hannes	8:50.42	Marco Vanderpoorten	8:59.13
Long jump	Björn De Decker	7.24 m (+2.8 m/s)	Yanni Sampson	7.19 m (-1.1 m/s)	Jente Hauttekeete	7.09 m (+1.2 m/s)
Triple jump	Leopold Kapata	15.10 m (+2.7 m/s)	Björn De Decker	14.95 m (+0.5 m/s)	Simon Baerts	14.07 m (+0.5 m/s)
High jump	Thomas Carmoy	2.17 m	Jef Vermeiren	2.13 m	Giebe Algoet	2.13 m
Pole vault	Ben Broeders	5.75 m	Arnaud Art	5.30 m	Thomas Van der Plaetsen	5.30 m
Shot put	Matthias Quintelier	16.83 m	Kwinten Cools	16.12 m	Jarno Wagemans	15.82 m
Discus throw	Philip Milanov	61.72 m	Lars Coene	51.94 m	Kwinten Cools	51.63 m
Javelin throw	Timothy Herman	75.28 m	Cedric Sorgeloos	70.78 m	Jonas De Busscher	66.91 m
Hammer throw	Rémi Malengreaux	62.61 m	Orry Willems	60.16 m	Kobe Gieghase	60.63 m

=== Women ===
Event	Gold		Silver		Bronze	
100 metres	Rani Rosius	11.28	Delphine Nkansa	11.42	Rani Vincke	11.54
200 metres	Delphine Nkansa	23.34	Imke Vervaet	23.39	Rani Rosius	23.60
400 metres	Naomi Van Den Broeck	51.73	Helena Ponette	51.93	Camille Laus	51.96
800 metres	Vanessa Scaunet	2:04.84	Rani Baillievier	2:04.90	Mariska Parewyck	2:06.77
1500 metres	Elise Vanderelst	4:13.61	Sofie Van Accom	4:18.12	Lotte Scheldeman	4:18.89
5000 metres	Lisa Rooms	16:06.64	Chloé Herbiet	16:15.36	Anne Schreurs	16:51.93
10,000 metres	Lisa Rooms	33:20.50	Nina Lauwaert	33:24.87	Chloé Herbiet	33:25.95
100 m hurdles	Anne Zagré	13.22	Nafissatou Thiam	13.50	Emma De Naeyer	13.99
400 m hurdles	Paulien Couckuyt	55.30	Nina Hespel	56.08	Hanne Claes	56.49
3000 m s'chase	Eline Dalemans	9:49.41	Fien Van Brussel	11:07.54	Emma Dubie	11:19.54
Long jump	Nafissatou Thiam	6.63 m (+1.0 m/s)	Sennah Vanhoeijen	6.18 m (+0.3 m/s)	Bo Brasseur	6.11 m (+1.7 m/s)
Triple jump	Saliyya Guisse	12.95 m (+1.0 m/s)	Ilona Masson	12.56 m (+0.3 m/s)	Elsa Loureiro	12.28 m (+1.8 m/s)
High jump	Zita Goossens	1.86 m	Noor Vidts	1.84 m	Merel Maes	1.82 m
Pole vault	Melanie Vissers	4.00 m	Fleur Hooyberghs	3.90 m	Kyani Joosten	3.60 m
Shot put	Jolien Boumkwo	16.08 m	Elena Defrère	15.55 m	Sietske Lenchant	14.61 m
Discus throw	Babette Vandeput	56.00 m	Anouska Hellebuyck	51.82 m	Katelijne Lyssens	50.61 m
Javelin throw	Pauline Smal	48.71 m	Kirsten Umans	44.57 m	Fleur Verstraete	43.71 m
Hammer throw	Vanessa Sterckendries	66.35 m	Ilke Lagrou	57.47 m	Evelyne Claes	46.90 m
