= 2021 Memorial Van Damme =

- Dates: 3 September (discus throw held on 1 September)
- Host city: Brussels, Belgium
- Venue: King Baudouin Stadium
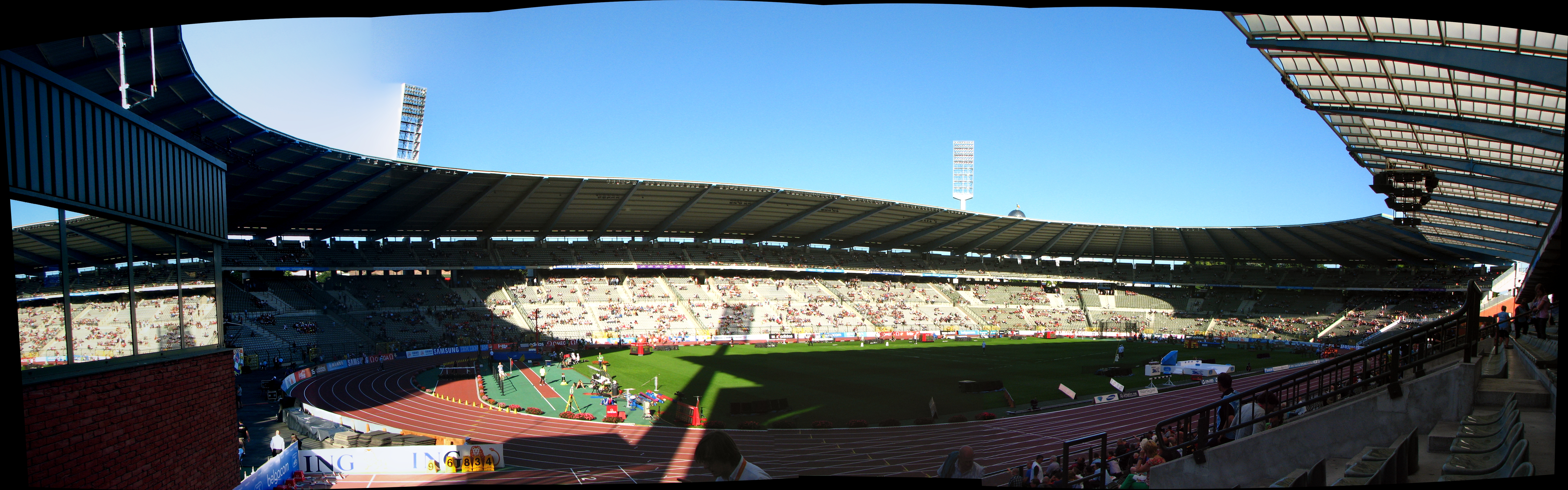
- Level: 2021 Diamond League

The 2021 Memorial Van Damme was the 45th edition of the annual track and field meeting in Brussels, Belgium. Held on 3 September at the King Baudouin Stadium, it was the thirteenth and penultimate leg of the 2021 Diamond League – the highest level international track and field circuit. The discus throw events were held on 1 September, two days before the rest of the meeting. Although Memorial Van Damme and Weltklasse Zürich co-hosted the finals during the last full season in 2019, in 2021 the series moved to a single final in Zürich.

The meeting was highlighted by Sifan Hassan nearly breaking the mile run world record with a 4:14.74 winning time. Additionally, the meeting attracted attention as two women's events (5000 metres and 200 metres) were won by women with XY disorders of sex development, affected by World Athletics' regulations on testosterone levels.

== Results ==
Athletes competing in the Diamond League disciplines earned extra compensation and points which went towards qualifying for the Diamond League finals in Zürich. First place earned 8 points, with each step down in place earning one less point than the previous, until no points are awarded in 9th place or lower.

The top-3 athletes in throwing and horizontal jumping events are ranked by the "Final 3" format, with their best mark overall in italics if it differs from their final trial.

=== Diamond Discipline ===
Men's Discus Throw
Place	Athlete	Country	Mark	Points
1st place, gold medalist(s)	Daniel Ståhl	Sweden	67.01 m / 69.31 m	8
2nd place, silver medalist(s)	Fedrick Dacres	Jamaica	61.75 m / 65.17 m	7
3rd place, bronze medalist(s)	Kristjan Čeh	Slovenia	NM / 65.68 m	6
4	Andrius Gudžius	Lithuania	64.14 m	5
5	Daniel Jasinski	Germany	63.84 m	4
6	Simon Pettersson	Sweden	63.57 m	3
7	Philip Milanov	Belgium	63.01 m	2
8	Mauricio Ortega	Colombia	62.76 m	1
9	Chad Wright	Jamaica	59.64 m	

Women's Discus Throw
Place	Athlete	Country	Mark	Points
1st place, gold medalist(s)	Yaime Pérez	Cuba	63.41 m / 66.47 m	8
2nd place, silver medalist(s)	Valarie Allman	United States	63.38 m / 64.25 m	7
3rd place, bronze medalist(s)	Sandra Perković	Croatia	NM / 65.14 m	6
4	Denia Caballero	Cuba	62.28 m	5
5	Marija Tolj	Croatia	61.80 m	4
6	Liliana Cá	Portugal	61.66 m	3
7	Kristin Pudenz	Germany	61.37 m	2
8	Mélina Robert-Michon	France	58.62 m	1
9	Claudine Vita	Germany	57.09 m	
—	Shadae Lawrence	Jamaica	NM	

Men's 100m (+0.1 m/s)
Place	Athlete	Country	Time	Points
1st place, gold medalist(s)	Fred Kerley	United States	9.94	8
2nd place, silver medalist(s)	Trayvon Bromell	United States	9.97	7
3rd place, bronze medalist(s)	Michael Norman	United States	9.98	6
4	Ferdinand Omanyala	Kenya	10.02	5
5	Rohan Browning	Australia	10.14	4
6	Akani Simbine	South Africa	10.18	3
7	Mouhamadou Fall	France	10.19	2
8	Arthur Cissé	Ivory Coast	10.34	1

Men's 400m
Place	Athlete	Country	Time	Points
1st place, gold medalist(s)	Michael Cherry	United States	44.03	8
2nd place, silver medalist(s)	Kirani James	Grenada	44.51	7
3rd place, bronze medalist(s)	Isaac Makwala	Botswana	44.83	6
4	Liemarvin Bonevacia	Netherlands	45.00	5
5	Deon Lendore	Trinidad and Tobago	45.06	4
6	Alexander Doom	Belgium	45.84	3
7	Christopher Taylor	Jamaica	45.88	2
8	Jonathan Sacoor	Belgium	46.66	1

Men's 1500m
Place	Athlete	Country	Time	Points
1st place, gold medalist(s)	Stewart McSweyn	Australia	3:33.20	8
2nd place, silver medalist(s)	Ollie Hoare	Australia	3:33.79	7
3rd place, bronze medalist(s)	Michał Rozmys	Poland	3:33.96	6
4	Abel Kipsang	Kenya	3:34.08	5
5	Charles Simotwo	Kenya	3:34.37	4
6	Simon Denissel	France	3:34.43	3
7	Mohamed Katir	Spain	3:34.50	2
8	Charles Grethen	Luxembourg	3:34.59	1
9	Adel Mechaal	Spain	3:35.37	
10	Samuel Tefera	Ethiopia	3:36.20	
11	Ismael Debjani	Belgium	3:43.08	
12	Jochem Vermeulen	Belgium	3:53.36	
	Boaz Kiprugut	Kenya	DNF	
	Erik Sowinski	United States	DNF	

Men's 400mH
Place	Athlete	Country	Time	Points
1st place, gold medalist(s)	Alison dos Santos	Brazil	48.23	8
2nd place, silver medalist(s)	Kyron McMaster	British Virgin Islands	48.31	7
3rd place, bronze medalist(s)	Yasmani Copello	Turkey	48.45	6
4	Jaheel Hyde	Jamaica	48.91	5
5	Rasmus Mägi	Estonia	49.13	4
6	Ramsey Angela	Netherlands	49.53	3
7	Chris McAlister	Great Britain	50.09	2
8	Constantin Preis	Germany	50.12	1

Men's Pole Vault
Place	Athlete	Country	Mark	Points
1st place, gold medalist(s)	Armand Duplantis	Sweden	6.05 m	8
2nd place, silver medalist(s)	Chris Nilsen	United States	5.85 m	7
3rd place, bronze medalist(s)	KC Lightfoot	United States	5.85 m	6
4	Ben Broeders	Belgium	5.75 m	5
5	Timur Morgunov	Authorised Neutral Athletes	5.75 m	4
6	Rutger Koppelaar	Netherlands	5.65 m	3
7	Piotr Lisek	Poland	5.65 m	2
8	Menno Vloon	Netherlands	5.65 m	1
9	Bo Kanda Lita Baehre	Germany	5.65 m	
10	EJ Obiena	Philippines	5.65 m	
11	Valentin Lavillenie	France	5.50 m	
12	Harry Coppell	Great Britain	5.50 m	

Men's Long Jump
Place	Athlete	Country	Mark	Points
1st place, gold medalist(s)	Steffin McCarter	United States	7.99 m (+0.6 m/s)	8
2nd place, silver medalist(s)	Ruswahl Samaai	South Africa	7.89 m (+0.0 m/s) / 7.95 m (+0.6 m/s)	7
3rd place, bronze medalist(s)	Filippo Randazzo	Italy	NM / 7.89 m (+0.7 m/s)	6
4	Benjamin Gföhler	Switzerland	7.77 m (+0.8 m/s)	5
5	Artem Primak	Authorised Neutral Athletes	7.71 m (+0.5 m/s)	4
6	Erwan Konaté	France	7.68 m (+0.7 m/s)	3
7	Eusebio Cáceres	Spain	7.55 m (+0.8 m/s)	2
8	Fabian Heinle	Germany	7.42 m (+0.3 m/s)	1
9	Jente Hauttekeete	Belgium	7.18 m (+0.4 m/s)	

Women's 200m (+0.4 m/s)
Place	Athlete	Country	Time	Points
1st place, gold medalist(s)	Christine Mboma	Namibia	21.84	8
2nd place, silver medalist(s)	Shericka Jackson	Jamaica	21.95	7
3rd place, bronze medalist(s)	Dina Asher-Smith	Great Britain	22.04	6
4	Sha'Carri Richardson	United States	22.45	5
5	Beatrice Masilingi	Namibia	22.50	4
6	Imke Vervaet	Belgium	23.28	3
7	Lilly Kaden	Germany	23.40	2
8	Rani Rosius	Belgium	23.79	1

Women's 800m
Place	Athlete	Country	Time	Points
1st place, gold medalist(s)	Natoya Goule	Jamaica	1:58.09	8
2nd place, silver medalist(s)	Keely Hodgkinson	Great Britain	1:58.16	7
3rd place, bronze medalist(s)	Jemma Reekie	Great Britain	1:58.77	6
4	Habitam Alemu	Ethiopia	1:59.01	5
5	Kate Grace	United States	1:59.22	4
6	Lovisa Lindh	Sweden	1:59.49	3
7	Halimah Nakaayi	Uganda	1:59.55	2
8	Mary Moraa	Kenya	1:59.79	1
	Noélie Yarigo	Benin	DNF	

Women's Mile
Place	Athlete	Country	Time	Points
1st place, gold medalist(s)	Sifan Hassan	Netherlands	4:14.74	8
2nd place, silver medalist(s)	Axumawit Embaye	Ethiopia	4:21.08	7
3rd place, bronze medalist(s)	Linden Hall	Australia	4:21.38	6
4	Marta Pérez	Spain	4:21.58	5
5	Elise Cranny	United States	4:21.90	4
6	Josette Andrews	United States	4:22.71	3
7	Esther Guerrero	Spain	4:22.81	2
8	Winnie Nanyondo	Uganda	4:23.09	1
9	Kristiina Mäki	Czech Republic	4:23.38	
10	Edinah Jebitok	Kenya	4:25.11	
11	Mebriht Mekonen	Ethiopia	4:28.39	
12	Elise Vanderelst	Belgium	4:32.44	
	Aneta Lemiesz	Poland	DNF	
	Eglay Nafuna Nalyanya	Kenya	DNF	

Women's 5000m
Place	Athlete	Country	Time	Points
1st place, gold medalist(s)	Francine Niyonsaba	Burundi	14:25.34	8
2nd place, silver medalist(s)	Ejgayehu Taye	Ethiopia	14:25.63	7
3rd place, bronze medalist(s)	Hellen Obiri	Kenya	14:26.23	6
4	Margaret Kipkemboi	Kenya	14:27.12	5
5	Lilian Kasait Rengeruk	Kenya	14:30.32	4
6	Eva Cherono	Kenya	14:30.77	3
7	Eilish McColgan	Great Britain	14:31.26	2
8	Konstanze Klosterhalfen	Germany	14:35.88	1
9	Alicia Monson	United States	14:42.56	
10	Karoline Bjerkeli Grøvdal	Norway	14:43.26	
11	Beatrice Chebet	Kenya	14:47.31	
12	Abersh Minsewo	Ethiopia	14:50.88	
13	Bosena Mulatie	Ethiopia	14:55.18	
14	Daisy Cherotich	Kenya	14:56.46	
15	Dominique Scott-Efurd	South Africa	15:01.66	
	Kate Van Buskirk	Canada	DNF	
	Michelle Finn	Ireland	DNF	

Women's 100mH (+0.7 m/s)
Place	Athlete	Country	Time	Points
1st place, gold medalist(s)	Nadine Visser	Netherlands	12.69	8
2nd place, silver medalist(s)	Tobi Amusan	Nigeria	12.69	7
3rd place, bronze medalist(s)	Megan Tapper	Jamaica	12.77	6
4	Cindy Sember	Great Britain	12.79	5
5	Gabbi Cunningham	United States	12.89	4
6	Anne Zagré	Belgium	12.96	3
7	Noor Vidts	Belgium	13.55	2
	Danielle Williams	Jamaica	DQ	

Women's High Jump
Place	Athlete	Country	Mark	Points
1st place, gold medalist(s)	Yaroslava Mahuchikh	Ukraine	2.02 m	8
2nd place, silver medalist(s)	Mariya Lasitskene	Authorised Neutral Athletes	2.00 m	7
3rd place, bronze medalist(s)	Nicola Olyslagers	Australia	2.00 m	6
4	Iryna Herashchenko	Ukraine	1.92 m	5
5	Karyna Demidik	Belarus	1.92 m	4
6	Nafissatou Thiam	Belgium	1.92 m	3
7	Eleanor Patterson	Australia	1.92 m	2
8	Yuliya Levchenko	Ukraine	1.88 m	1
9	Alessia Trost	Italy	1.80 m	

=== National Events ===
Men's 800m
Place	Athlete	Country	Time
1st place, gold medalist(s)	Ferguson Rotich	Kenya	1:43.81
2nd place, silver medalist(s)	Eliott Crestan	Belgium	1:45.24
3rd place, bronze medalist(s)	Cornelius Tuwei	Kenya	1:45.29
4	Aurèle Vandeputte	Belgium	1:45.49
5	Mouad Zahafi	Morocco	1:45.70
6	Collins Kipruto	Kenya	1:46.56
7	Tibo De Smet	Belgium	1:47.68
8	Ruben Verheyden	Belgium	1:47.81
9	Pieter Sisk	Belgium	1:48.39
	Patryk Sieradzki	Poland	DNF

Women's 400m
Place	Athlete	Country	Time
1st place, gold medalist(s)	Camille Laus	Belgium	52.34
2nd place, silver medalist(s)	Eveline Saalberg	Netherlands	52.38
3rd place, bronze medalist(s)	Andrea Bouma	Netherlands	53.39
4	Paulien Couckuyt	Belgium	53.68
5	Laura de Witte	Netherlands	54.84
6	Manon Depuydt	Belgium	55.37
7	Ilana Hanssens	Belgium	56.27
	Maureen Ellsworth	Netherlands	DQ

=== U18 Events ===
Men's 100m (+0.6 m/s)
Place	Athlete	Country	Time
1st place, gold medalist(s)	Luca Laurent	Belgium	10.73
2nd place, silver medalist(s)	Marnix de Pauw	Belgium	10.80
3rd place, bronze medalist(s)	Dieter Bergs	Belgium	10.83
4	Cédric Verschueren	Belgium	10.84
5	Cédric Motieh	Belgium	10.94
6	Ibrahim Camara	Belgium	11.07
7	Stijn van der Vreken	Belgium	11.12
8	Senne de Vos	Belgium	11.14

Men's 1000m
Place	Athlete	Country	Time
1st place, gold medalist(s)	Régis Thibert	Belgium	2:28.35
2nd place, silver medalist(s)	Mathis Lievens	Belgium	2:31.03
3rd place, bronze medalist(s)	Simon Jeukenne	Belgium	2:32.90
4	Balder van Eenoo	Belgium	2:33.29
5	Ugo Desclin	Belgium	2:33.77
6	Viktor Leenaert	Belgium	2:33.87
7	Kobe Wachtelaer	Belgium	2:34.17
8	Matteo Scieur	Belgium	2:35.50
9	Arthur Engelen	Belgium	2:35.97
10	Yeabsera van den Bulck	Belgium	2:36.54
11	Nicolas Mearegu	Belgium	2:36.56
12	Piotr Zagorski	Poland	2:36.67
13	Wout Logier	Belgium	2:36.89
14	Niels Oosterlinck	Belgium	2:36.92
15	Noah Coetsier	Belgium	2:37.27
16	Tristan Gevaert	Belgium	2:37.48

Men's Long Jump
Place	Athlete	Country	Mark
1st place, gold medalist(s)	Yanni Sampson	Belgium	6.97 m
2nd place, silver medalist(s)	Sasha Sijbers	Belgium	6.78 m
3rd place, bronze medalist(s)	Clément Bouchard	Belgium	6.70 m
4	Bert Hermens	Belgium	6.64 m
5	Gatien Vandooren	Belgium	6.56 m
6	Dai Keïta	Belgium	6.52 m
7	Noe Mohring	Belgium	6.13 m
8	Maxim Verniers	Belgium	6.11 m

Women's 100m (−0.5 m/s)
Place	Athlete	Country	Time
1st place, gold medalist(s)	Tinne Vertongen	Belgium	12.03
2nd place, silver medalist(s)	Zoë Laureys	Belgium	12.18
3rd place, bronze medalist(s)	Noor Vermeiren	Belgium	12.54
4	Hanne Bastiaansen	Belgium	12.62
5	Calista Museur	Belgium	12.72
6	Alexandra Mortant	Belgium	12.72
7	Noor Koekelkoren	Belgium	13.03
8	Sennah Vanhoeijen	Belgium	13.54

Women's 1000m
Place	Athlete	Country	Time
1st place, gold medalist(s)	Fien Peusens	Belgium	2:50.56
2nd place, silver medalist(s)	Elena Kluskens	Belgium	2:51.38
3rd place, bronze medalist(s)	Jana Kluskens	Belgium	2:51.91
4	Nina van Pelt	Belgium	2:52.11
5	Hannah Enkels	Belgium	2:52.48
6	Femke D'Hauwers	Belgium	2:53.10
7	Maaike Vander Cruyssen	Belgium	2:54.13
8	Charlotte Penneman	Belgium	2:55.14
9	Nel Vanopstal	Belgium	2:55.27
10	Léa Scutnaire	Belgium	2:55.42
11	Adeline Temmerman	Belgium	2:55.43
12	Emma Vanhoeck	Belgium	2:58.24
13	Elke de Dobbelaere	Belgium	3:02.10
14	Noor Quintelier	Belgium	3:02.14
15	Marthe Nagels	Belgium	3:02.79

Women's High Jump
Place	Athlete	Country	Mark
1st place, gold medalist(s)	Anne-Laure Hervers	Belgium	1.75 m
2nd place, silver medalist(s)	Svenia de Coninck	Belgium	1.60 m
3rd place, bronze medalist(s)	Lola de Rijck	Belgium	1.60 m
4	Charlot Swanckaert	Belgium	1.60 m
5	Flora Collette	Belgium	1.55 m

== See also ==
- 2021 Weltklasse Zürich (2021 Diamond League final)
