= 2023 Belgian Indoor Athletics Championships =

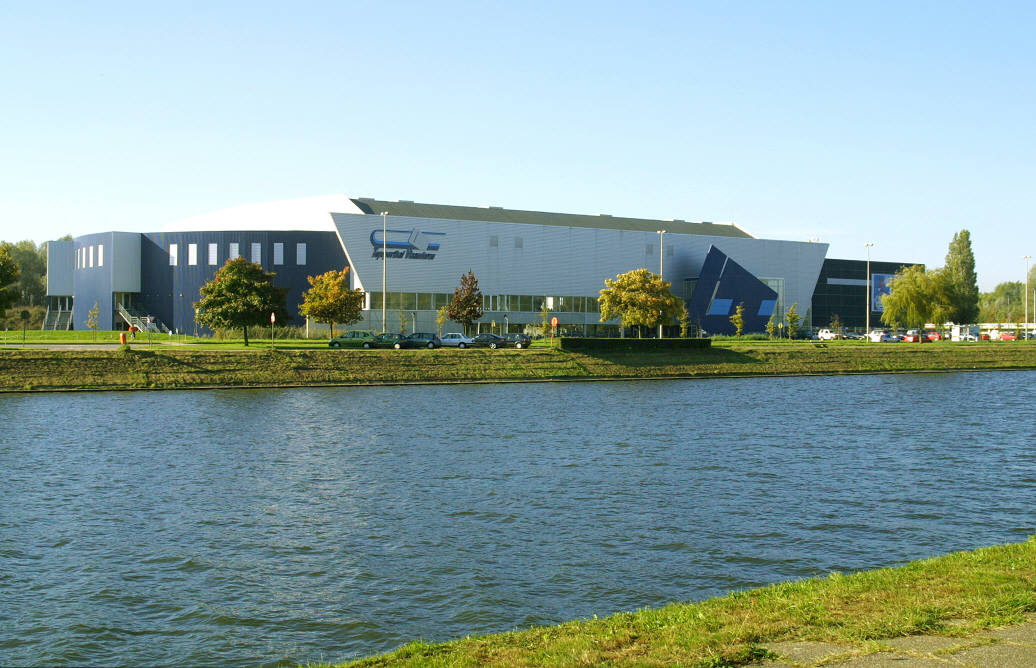
- The host stadium
- Dates: 19 February
- Host city: Ghent
- Venue: Flanders Sports Arena
- Events: 25

The 2023 Belgian Indoor Athletics Championships (Dutch: Belgische kampioenschappen indoor atletiek 20233, French: Championnats de Belgique d'athlétisme en salle 2023) was the year's national championship in indoor track and field for Belgium. It was held on Sunday 19 February at the Flanders Sports Arena in Ghent. A total of 25 events, 13 for men and 12 for women, were contested. It served as preparation for the 2023 European Athletics Indoor Championships.

Two Belgian indoor records were broken at the competition: Imke Vervaet ran 23.26 seconds to win the women's 200 metres and Jolien Boumkwo won the women's shot put with 17.87 m.

== Results ==
=== Men ===
Event	Gold		Silver		Bronze	
60 metres	Ward Merckx	6.67	Rendel Vermeulen	6.88	Simon Verherstraeten	6.89
200 metres	Christian Iguacel	20.90	Julien Watrin	20.90	Jaron De Vriese	21.25
400 metres	Florent Mabille	47.85	Dries Van Nieuwenhove	47.87	Maarten Heylen	48.12
800 metres	Eliott Crestan	1:49.26	Tibo De Smet	1:49.65	Aurèle Vandeputte	1:50.83
1500 metres	Jochem Vermeulen	3:55.44	Pieter Sisk	3:56.03	Julien Celis	4:00.67
3000 metres	Donald Lalmand	8:55.40	Simon Vandebon	9:01.79	Only two finishers	
5000 m walk	Benjamin Leroy	27:45.50	Peter Van Hove	28:05.06	Jasper Van Hove	28:33.72
60 m hurdles	Dylan Caty	7.92	Nolan Vancauwemberghe	7.99	Senne Segers	8.15
Long jump	Jente Hauttekeete	7.19 m	Yanni Sampson	6.99 m	Kwinten Torfs	6.82 m
Triple jump	Leopold Kapata	14.82 m	Björn De Decker	14.72 m	David Boda	14.68 m
High jump	Thomas Carmoy	2.20 m	Lars Van Looy	2.13 m	Bram Ghuys Jef Vermeiren	2.10 m
Pole vault	Ben Broeders	5.80 m	Robin Bodart	5.40 m	Thomas Van Nuffelen	5.20 m
Shot put	Andreas De Lathauwer	17.49 m	Kwinten Cools	17.21 m	Jarno Wagemans	15.79 m

=== Women ===
Event	Gold		Silver		Bronze	
60 metres	Rani Rosius	7.20	Delphine Nkansa	7.28	Rani Vincke	7.40
200 metres	Imke Vervaet	23.26 NR	Kylie Lambert	23.98	Justine Goossens	24.01
400 metres	Naomi Van Den Broeck	52.89	Camille Laus	53.01	Hanne Claes	53.03
800 metres	Rani Baillievier	2:07.90	Renée Eykens	2:08.81	Lize De Vlieger	2:08.84
1500 metres	Mariska Parewyck	4:23.16	Lore Quataker	4:30.92	Caroline Baudinet	4:39.55
3000 m walk	Liesbet De Smet	18:01.31	Myriam Nicolas	18:07.89	Ellen Piedfort	21:27.86
60 m hurdles	Laures Bauwens	8.49	Noor Koekelkoren	8.53	Emma De Naeyer	8.53
Long jump	Maité Beernaert	5.98 m	Laura Ooghe	5.88 m	Stefanie Brosens	5.84 m
Triple jump	Elsa Loureiro	12.28 m	Géraldine Dheur	11.78 m	Estelle Goffin	11.77 m
High jump	Merel Maes	1.88 m	Anne-Laure Hervers	1.79 m	Yorunn Ligneel	1.77 m
Pole vault	Fleur Hooyberghs	4.05 m	Melanie Vissers	4.00 m	Elien Vekemans	4.00 m
Shot put	Jolien Boumkwo	17.87 m NR	Elena Defrère	15.68 m	Elise Helsen	13.77 m
