= 2022 Belgian Indoor Athletics Championships =

- Dates: 26 February
- Host city: Louvain-la-Neuve
- Venue: Complexe sportif de Blocry
- Events: 23

The 2022 Belgian Indoor Athletics Championships (Dutch: Belgische kampioenschappen indoor atletiek 2022, French: Championnats de Belgique d'athlétisme en salle 2022) was the year's national championship in indoor track and field for Belgium. It was held on Saturday 26 February at the Complexe sportif de Blocry in Louvain-la-Neuve. A total of 23 events, 12 for men and 11 for women, were contested. It served as preparation for the 2022 World Athletics Indoor Championships.

Three national records were broken at the competition, with Julien Watrin winning the men's 400 metres in 46.15 seconds, Eliott Crestan winning the men's 800 metres in 1:46.11, and Matthias Quintelier taking the men's shot put title with 18.92 m.

== Results ==
=== Men ===
Event	Gold		Silver		Bronze	
60 metres	Ward Merckx	6.71	Guelord Kola Biasu	6.85	Rendel Vermeulen	6.88
200 metres	Jordan Paquot	21.39	Amine Kasmi	21.51	Rendel Vermeulen	21.58
400 metres	Julien Watrin	46.15 s NR	Alexander Doom	47.46	Jonas De Smet	48.37
800 metres	Eliott Crestan	1:46.11 NR	Aurèle Vandeputte	1:46.49	Tibo De Smet	1:46.80
1500 metres	Ruben Verheyden	3:43.00	Valere Hustin	3:45.09	Ward Leunckens	3:47.83
3000 metres	Isaac Kimeli	7:46.62	Michael Somers	7:48.72	Simon Debognies	7:50.53
60 m hurdles	François Grailet	7.73	Senne Segers	8.12	Robin Van Damme	8.15
Long jump	Jente Hauttekeete	7.27 m	Thomas Van der Poel	7.19 m	Kwinten Torfs	6.82 m
Triple jump	Björn De Decker	15.06 m	Gregory Geerts	14.63 m	Pierrick Renard	13.77 m
High jump	Thomas Carmoy	2.19 m	Lars Van Looy	2.17 m	Bram Ghuys	2.15 m
Pole vault	Robin Bodart	5.10 m	Loïc Joannes	4.90 m	Guillaume Gobin	4.80 m
Shot put	Matthias Quintelier	18.92 m NR	Andreas De Lathauwer	16.84 m	Jarno Wagemans	15.63 m

=== Women ===
Event	Gold		Silver		Bronze	
60 metres	Rani Rosius	7.35	Elise Mehuys	7.40	Rani Vincke	7.48
200 metres	Imke Vervaet	23.47	Alizée Morency Poilvache	24.21	Justine Goossens	24.38
400 metres	Naomi Van Den Broeck	53.11	Hanne Claes	53.27	Nina Hespel	54.23
800 metres	Vanessa Scaunet	2:06.92	Camille Muls	2:08.57	Elena Kluskens	2:08.91
1500 metres	Jenna Wyns	4:23.24	Lore Quataker	4:26.30	Mathilde Deswaef	4:32.06
60 m hurdles	Anne Zagré	8.17	Noor Vidts	8.24	Victoria Rausch	8.25
Long jump	Hanne Maudens	6.15 m	Sennah Verhoeijen	5.91 m	Ilona Masson	5.87 m
Triple jump	Ilona Masson	12.91 m	Saliyya Guisse	12.79 m	Elsa Loureiro	12.64 m
High jump	Yorunn Ligneel	1.79 m	Anne-Laure Hervers	1.79 m	Marie De Troyer	1.68 m
Pole vault	Chloé Henry	3.90 m	Melanie Vissers	3.80 m	Dag-Ferene Van Capellen	3.60 m
Shot put	Jolien Boumkwo	16.21 m	Elena Defrère	14.99 m	Sietske Lenchant	14.50 m
