= 2023 Memorial Van Damme =

- Dates: 8 September (shot put held on 7 September)
- Host city: Brussels, Belgium
- Venue: King Baudouin Stadium
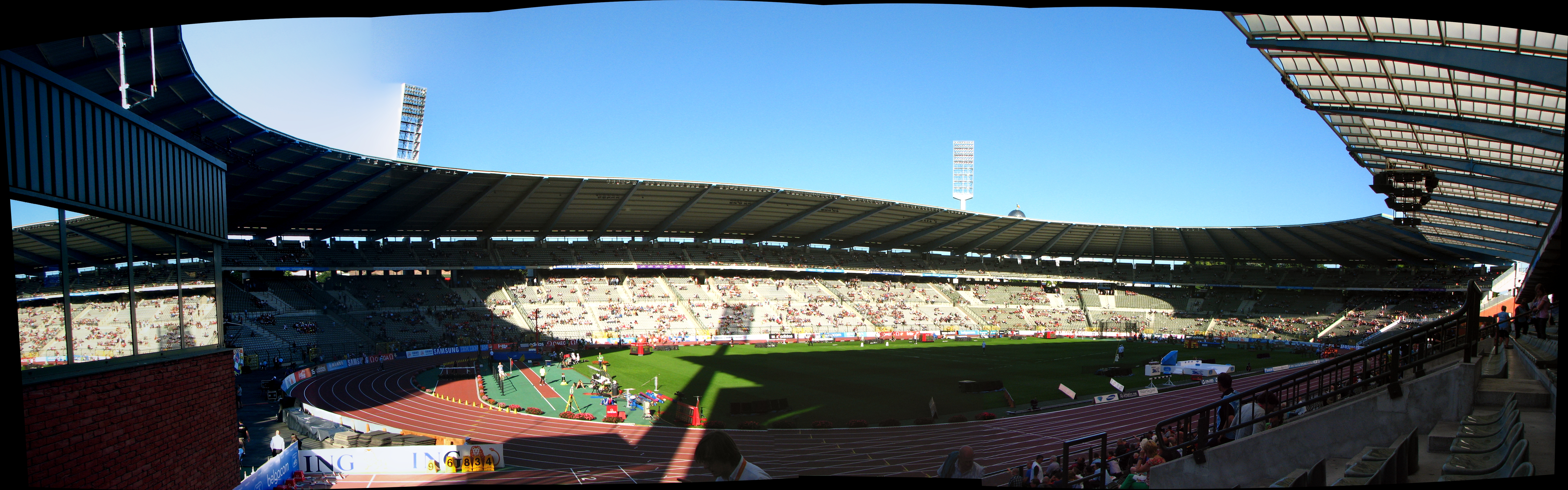
- Level: 2023 Diamond League

The 2023 Memorial Van Damme was the 47th edition of the annual track and field meeting in Brussels, Belgium. Held on 8 September at the King Baudouin Stadium, it was the 13th and penultimate leg of the 2023 Diamond League – the highest level international track and field circuit. The shot put event was held on 8 September, the day before the rest of the meeting.

At the meeting, Jakob Ingebrigtsen broke Hicham El Guerrouj's 2000 metres world record, with a time of 4:43.13. He passed through the 1600 metres in 3:48 before running his last lap in 54.9 seconds. In the women's 1500 metres, Laura Muir won while Addison Wiley became the only non-NCAA runner to break an American collegiate record, running 3:59.17.

== Results ==
Athletes competing in the Diamond League disciplines earned extra compensation and points which went towards qualifying for the 2023 Diamond League finals. First place earned 8 points, with each step down in place earning one less point than the previous, until no points are awarded in 9th place or lower.

=== Diamond Discipline ===
Women's Shot Put
Place	Athlete	Country	Mark	Points
1st place, gold medalist(s)	Chase Jackson	United States	20.05 m	8
2nd place, silver medalist(s)	Sarah Mitton	Canada	19.76 m	7
3rd place, bronze medalist(s)	Maggie Ewen	United States	19.64 m	6
4	Auriol Dongmo	Portugal	19.31 m	5
5	Adelaide Aquilla	United States	19.20 m	4
6	Jessica Schilder	Netherlands	18.93 m	3
7	Danniel Thomas-Dodd	Jamaica	18.88 m	2
8	Fanny Roos	Sweden	18.88 m	1
9	Jessica Woodard	United States	18.82 m	
10	Yemisi Ogunleye	Germany	17.57 m	

Men's 200m (−0.1 m/s)
Place	Athlete	Country	Time	Points
1st place, gold medalist(s)	Kenny Bednarek	United States	19.79	8
2nd place, silver medalist(s)	Zharnel Hughes	Great Britain	19.82	7
3rd place, bronze medalist(s)	Andre De Grasse	Canada	19.89	6
4	Aaron Brown	Canada	19.98	5
5	Joseph Fahnbulleh	Liberia	20.24	4
6	Filippo Tortu	Italy	20.30	3
7	Kyree King	United States	20.52	2
8	Reynier Mena	Cuba	20.93	1

Men's 400m
Place	Athlete	Country	Time	Points
1st place, gold medalist(s)	Rusheen McDonald	Jamaica	44.84	8
2nd place, silver medalist(s)	Alexander Ogando	Dominican Republic	44.93	7
3rd place, bronze medalist(s)	Håvard Bentdal Ingvaldsen	Norway	45.07	6
4	Leungo Scotch	Botswana	45.14	5
5	Gilles Biron	France	45.26	4
6	Dylan Borlée	Belgium	45.39	3
7	Alexander Doom	Belgium	45.77	2

Men's 800m
Place	Athlete	Country	Time	Points
1st place, gold medalist(s)	Djamel Sedjati	Algeria	1:43.60	8
2nd place, silver medalist(s)	Yanis Meziane	France	1:43.94	7
3rd place, bronze medalist(s)	Tshepiso Masalela	Botswana	1:44.03	6
4	Daniel Rowden	Great Britain	1:44.12	5
5	Ben Pattison	Great Britain	1:44.32	4
6	Bryce Hoppel	United States	1:44.37	3
7	Wyclife Kinyamal	Kenya	1:44.38	2
8	Saúl Ordóñez	Spain	1:44.84	1
9	Slimane Moula	Algeria	1:45.80	
	Khalid Benmahdi	Algeria	DNF	
	Collins Kipruto	Kenya	DNF	

Men's 2000m
Place	Athlete	Country	Time	Points
1st place, gold medalist(s)	Jakob Ingebrigtsen	Norway	4:43.13	8
2nd place, silver medalist(s)	Reynold Cheruiyot	Kenya	4:48.14	7
3rd place, bronze medalist(s)	Stewart McSweyn	Australia	4:48.77	6
4	Niels Laros	Netherlands	4:49.68	5
5	Mario García	Spain	4:49.85	4
6	Narve Gilje Nordås	Norway	4:50.64	3
7	Abel Kipsang	Kenya	4:50.68	2
8	Charles Philibert-Thiboutot	Canada	4:51.54	1
9	Ruben Verheyden	Belgium	4:52.37	
10	Sam Tanner	New Zealand	4:53.09	
11	Jochem Vermeulen	Belgium	5:03.24	
	Mounir Akbache	France	DNF	
	Ismael Debjani	Belgium	DNF	
	Boaz Kiprugut	Kenya	DNF	
	Cornelius Tuwei	Kenya	DNF	

Men's Pole Vault
Place	Athlete	Country	Mark	Points
1st place, gold medalist(s)	Armand Duplantis	Sweden	6.10 m	8
2nd place, silver medalist(s)	Sam Kendricks	United States	5.92 m	7
3rd place, bronze medalist(s)	EJ Obiena	Philippines	5.92 m	6
4	Chris Nilsen	United States	5.82 m	5
5	KC Lightfoot	United States	5.82 m	4
6	Zach McWhorter	United States	5.82 m	3
7	Thibaut Collet	France	5.82 m	2
8	Sondre Guttormsen	Norway	5.72 m	1
9	Ben Broeders	Belgium	5.72 m	
10	Kurtis Marschall	Australia	5.62 m	

Women's 100m (±0.0 m/s)
Place	Athlete	Country	Time	Points
1st place, gold medalist(s)	Elaine Thompson-Herah	Jamaica	10.84	8
2nd place, silver medalist(s)	Natasha Morrison	Jamaica	10.95	7
3rd place, bronze medalist(s)	Dina Asher-Smith	Great Britain	10.97	6
4	Zoe Hobbs	New Zealand	11.14	5
5	Shashalee Forbes	Jamaica	11.17	4
6	Gina Bass	Gambia	11.18	3
7	Rani Rosius	Belgium	11.31	2

Women's 200m (+0.2 m/s)
Place	Athlete	Country	Time	Points
1st place, gold medalist(s)	Shericka Jackson	Jamaica	21.48	8
2nd place, silver medalist(s)	Anthonique Strachan	Bahamas	22.31	7
3rd place, bronze medalist(s)	Jenna Prandini	United States	22.47	6
4	Daryll Neita	Great Britain	22.59	5
5	Maboundou Koné	Ivory Coast	22.79	4
6	Tasa Jiya	Netherlands	22.96	3
7	Delphine Nkansa	Belgium	23.43	2

Women's 400m
Place	Athlete	Country	Time	Points
1st place, gold medalist(s)	Cynthia Bolingo	Belgium	50.09	8
2nd place, silver medalist(s)	Lieke Klaver	Netherlands	50.16	7
3rd place, bronze medalist(s)	Shamier Little	United States	50.58	6
4	Victoria Ohuruogu	Great Britain	50.81	5
5	Candice McLeod	Jamaica	50.82	4
6	Laviai Nielsen	Great Britain	50.84	3
7	Helena Ponette	Belgium	51.87	2

Women's 1500m
Place	Athlete	Country	Time	Points
1st place, gold medalist(s)	Laura Muir	Great Britain	3:55.34	8
2nd place, silver medalist(s)	Ciara Mageean	Ireland	3:55.87	7
3rd place, bronze medalist(s)	Nelly Chepchirchir	Kenya	3:56.93	6
4	Jessica Hull	Australia	3:57.75	5
5	Katie Snowden	Great Britain	3:58.03	4
6	Hirut Meshesha	Ethiopia	3:58.06	3
7	Melissa Courtney-Bryant	Great Britain	3:58.09	2
8	Addison Wiley	United States	3:59.17	1
9	Sinclaire Johnson	United States	3:59.19	
10	Linden Hall	Australia	4:00.41	
11	Saron Berhe	Ethiopia	4:00.46	
12	Marta Pérez	Spain	4:00.53	
13	Esther Guerrero	Spain	4:02.27	
14	Cory McGee	United States	4:02.32	
15	Elise Vanderelst	Belgium	4:10.65	
	Noélie Yarigo	Benin	DNF	
	Purity Chepkirui	Kenya	DNF	
	Claudia Bobocea	Romania	DNF	

Women's 5000m
Place	Athlete	Country	Time	Points
1st place, gold medalist(s)	Lilian Kasait Rengeruk	Kenya	14:26.46	8
2nd place, silver medalist(s)	Medina Eisa	Ethiopia	14:28.94	7
3rd place, bronze medalist(s)	Nozomi Tanaka	Japan	14:29.18	6
4	Winnie Jemutai	Kenya	14:39.05	5
5	Ayal Dagnachew	Ethiopia	14:39.11	4
6	Mekedes Alemeshete	Ethiopia	14:45.13	3
7	Karoline Bjerkeli Grøvdal	Norway	14:47.84	2
8	Jessica Warner-Judd	Great Britain	14:51.53	1
9	Edinah Jebitok	Kenya	14:52.28	
10	Maureen Koster	Netherlands	14:52.90	
11	Elise Cranny	United States	14:57.52	
12	Camilla Richardsson	Finland	15:13.69	
13	Tigist Ketema	Ethiopia	15:17.27	
	Lorena Martín	Spain	DNF	
	Caroline Nyaga	Kenya	DNF	

Women's 400mH
Place	Athlete	Country	Time	Points
1st place, gold medalist(s)	Femke Bol	Netherlands	52.11	8
2nd place, silver medalist(s)	Janieve Russell	Jamaica	53.80	7
3rd place, bronze medalist(s)	Rushell Clayton	Jamaica	54.10	6
4	Anna Cockrell	United States	54.29	5
5	Ayomide Folorunso	Italy	54.42	4
6	Andrenette Knight	Jamaica	54.75	3
7	Hanne Claes	Belgium	54.95	2
8	Viktoriya Tkachuk	Ukraine	54.98	1

Women's High Jump
Place	Athlete	Country	Mark	Points
1st place, gold medalist(s)	Yaroslava Mahuchikh	Ukraine	2.00 m	8
2nd place, silver medalist(s)	Angelina Topić	Serbia	1.97 m	7
3rd place, bronze medalist(s)	Eleanor Patterson	Australia	1.94 m	6
4	Iryna Herashchenko	Ukraine	1.91 m	5
5	Morgan Lake	Great Britain	1.91 m	4
6	Lia Apostolovski	Slovenia	1.91 m	3
7	Nawal Meniker	France	1.84 m	2
8	Merel Maes	Belgium	1.84 m	1
9	Elisabeth Pihela	Estonia	1.80 m	
10	Heta Tuuri	Finland	1.80 m	

Women's Triple Jump
Place	Athlete	Country	Mark	Points
1st place, gold medalist(s)	Shanieka Ricketts	Jamaica	15.01 m (+0.3 m/s)	8
2nd place, silver medalist(s)	Maryna Bekh-Romanchuk	Ukraine	14.57 m (−0.1 m/s)	7
3rd place, bronze medalist(s)	Thea LaFond	Dominica	14.49 m (+0.4 m/s)	6
4	Dariya Derkach	Italy	14.17 m (+0.7 m/s)	5
5	Kimberly Williams	Jamaica	13.96 m (+0.4 m/s)	4
6	Ottavia Cestonaro	Italy	13.76 m (+0.2 m/s)	3
7	Dovilė Kilty	Lithuania	13.44 m (+0.2 m/s)	2
8	Diana Zagainova	Lithuania	13.26 m (+0.5 m/s)	1

Women's Javelin Throw
Place	Athlete	Country	Mark	Points
1st place, gold medalist(s)	Haruka Kitaguchi	Japan	67.38 m	8
2nd place, silver medalist(s)	Victoria Hudson	Austria	64.65 m	7
3rd place, bronze medalist(s)	Līna Mūze	Latvia	63.00 m	6
4	Flor Ruiz	Colombia	62.51 m	5
5	Nikola Ogrodníková	Czech Republic	60.18 m	4
6	Tori Peeters	New Zealand	59.93 m	3
7	Annu Rani	India	57.74 m	2
8	Liveta Jasiūnaitė	Lithuania	56.70 m	1

=== National events ===
Men's Shot Put
Place	Athlete	Country	Mark
1st place, gold medalist(s)	Kwinten Cools	Belgium	17.24 m
2nd place, silver medalist(s)	Andreas De Lathauwer	Belgium	16.97 m
3rd place, bronze medalist(s)	Max Vlassak	Belgium	16.17 m
4	Cédric Broeckaert	Belgium	15.20 m
5	Jonathan Guillaume	Belgium	15.08 m
6	Leander Casteels	Belgium	14.59 m

Women's Shot Put
Place	Athlete	Country	Mark
1st place, gold medalist(s)	Jolien Boumkwo	Belgium	16.84 m
2nd place, silver medalist(s)	Melissa Boekelman	Netherlands	16.42 m
3rd place, bronze medalist(s)	Elena Defrère	Belgium	15.01 m
4	Cassandre Evans	Belgium	13.18 m
5	Florence Boeynaems	Belgium	13.17 m
6	Elise Helsen	Belgium	12.87 m
7	Jo-Anne Liefooghe	Belgium	12.48 m

Men's 4 × 100 m
Place	Athlete	Country	Time
1st place, gold medalist(s)	Xavi Mo-Ajok; Taymir Burnet; Hensley Paulina; Raphael Bouju	Netherlands	38.49
2nd place, silver medalist(s)	Kobe Vleminckx; Ward Merckx; Antoine Snyders; Valentijn Hoornaert	Belgium	38.77

=== Promotional events ===
Men's 10,000m
Place	Athlete	Country	Time
1st place, gold medalist(s)	Daniel Ebenyo	Kenya	26:57.80
2nd place, silver medalist(s)	Jimmy Gressier	France	27:25.48
3rd place, bronze medalist(s)	Stanley Mburu	Kenya	27:30.36
4	Amanal Petros	Germany	27:47.62
5	Nicholas Kimeli	Kenya	28:05.12
6	Andrew Butchart	Great Britain	28:11.60
7	Yann Schrub	France	28:13.96
8	Aron Kifle	Eritrea	30:23.33
	Bashir Abdi	Belgium	DNF
	Santiago Catrofe	Uruguay	DNF
	Youssouf Hiss Bachir	Djibouti	DNF
	Benard Kibet	Kenya	DNF
	Magnus Tuv Myhre	Norway	DNF
	Ayele Tadesse	Ethiopia	DNF

Men's 400m
Place	Athlete	Country	Time
1st place, gold medalist(s)	Isayah Boers	Netherlands	45.47
2nd place, silver medalist(s)	Robin Vanderbemden	Belgium	45.51
3rd place, bronze medalist(s)	Julien Watrin	Belgium	45.60
4	Isaya Klein Ikkink	Netherlands	45.71
5	Patrik Šorm	Czech Republic	45.80
6	Lewis Davey	Great Britain	45.82
7	Florent Mabille	Belgium	46.11
8	Jonathan Sacoor	Belgium	46.18

Women's 400m
Place	Athlete	Country	Time
1st place, gold medalist(s)	Amandine Brossier	France	51.40
2nd place, silver medalist(s)	Imke Vervaet	Belgium	52.00
3rd place, bronze medalist(s)	Kaylin Whitney	United States	52.11
4	Eveline Saalberg	Netherlands	52.31
5	Cathelijn Peeters	Netherlands	52.72
6	Camille Laus	Belgium	53.31
7	Fatou Gaye	Senegal	54.19
8	Kylie Lambert	Belgium	54.84

Women's Long Jump
Place	Athlete	Country	Mark
1st place, gold medalist(s)	Ivana Španović	Serbia	6.74 m (+0.3 m/s)
2nd place, silver medalist(s)	Noor Vidts	Belgium	6.38 m (−0.3 m/s)
3rd place, bronze medalist(s)	Tissanna Hickling	Jamaica	6.19 m (−0.1 m/s)
4	Rougui Sow	France	6.14 m (+0.2 m/s)

=== U18 events ===
Men's 100m (−0.4 m/s)
Place	Athlete	Country	Time
1st place, gold medalist(s)	Rune Vandezande	Belgium	10.99
2nd place, silver medalist(s)	Niels van de Cloodt	Belgium	11.07
3rd place, bronze medalist(s)	Xavier Rousseau	Belgium	11.08
4	Jilcien Planchon	Belgium	11.12
5	Kobe van Raemdonck	Belgium	11.22
6	Robbe Carchon	Belgium	11.29
7	Tiago Lecomte	Belgium	11.30
8	Mateo Bogaert	Belgium	11.37

Men's 1000m
Place	Athlete	Country	Time
1st place, gold medalist(s)	Reda Aouragh	Belgium	2:28.10
2nd place, silver medalist(s)	Gauthier Walcarius	Belgium	2:29.07
3rd place, bronze medalist(s)	Mats Vervoort	Belgium	2:29.45
4	Amadeo Cortes	Belgium	2:30.07
5	Tijl Wachtelaer	Belgium	2:30.72
6	Diego Rocks	Belgium	2:31.08
7	Pierre Marchandise	Belgium	2:31.12
8	Gust van Canneyt	Belgium	2:31.65
9	Miro Verledens	Belgium	2:31.68
10	Willem Renders	Belgium	2:32.07
11	Enzo Legendre	Belgium	2:32.60
12	Sterre Dieltjens	Belgium	2:33.96
13	Daan Lievens	Belgium	2:34.88

Men's Javelin Throw (700gr)
Place	Athlete	Country	Mark
1st place, gold medalist(s)	Tuur Lambrechts	Belgium	60.47 m
2nd place, silver medalist(s)	Lukas Sarrazyn	Belgium	55.14 m
3rd place, bronze medalist(s)	Finn Coene	Belgium	54.09 m

Men's 4 × 100 m
Place	Athlete	Country	Time
1st place, gold medalist(s)		Belgium	42.25
		Belgium	DNF

Women's 100m (+0.4 m/s)
Place	Athlete	Country	Time
1st place, gold medalist(s)	Djemine Kudura	Belgium	11.92
2nd place, silver medalist(s)	Camille Sonneville	Belgium	11.99
3rd place, bronze medalist(s)	Lore Foesters	Belgium	12.10
4	Jana de Raedt	Belgium	12.11
5	Ine Impens	Belgium	12.23
6	Lauren Petroci-Coninx	Belgium	12.27
7	Chloe Philippe	Belgium	12.36
8	Anyssa Laurent	Belgium	12.52

Women's 1000m
Place	Athlete	Country	Time
1st place, gold medalist(s)	Astrid van Breedam	Belgium	3:01.81
2nd place, silver medalist(s)	Ninte Kegeleers	Belgium	3:01.90
3rd place, bronze medalist(s)	Julie Charlier	Belgium	3:02.60
4	Sophie Dethier	Belgium	3:02.61
5	Eline Debaere	Belgium	3:02.82
6	Pauline Inghelbrecht	Belgium	3:03.94
7	Flore Vergote	Belgium	3:04.95
	Myrthe Baeten	Belgium	DNF
	Cyrielle Henriques	Belgium	DNF

Women's High Jump
Place	Athlete	Country	Mark
1st place, gold medalist(s)	Maryna Kovtunova	Ukraine	1.80 m
2nd place, silver medalist(s)	Svea van Laere	Belgium	1.65 m
3rd place, bronze medalist(s)	Olivia Daumerie	Belgium	1.60 m
4	Emeline Lippens	Belgium	1.60 m
5	Camille Dedoyart	Belgium	1.55 m

Women's 4 × 100 m
Place	Athlete	Country	Time
1st place, gold medalist(s)		Belgium	46.78
2nd place, silver medalist(s)		Belgium	47.90
3rd place, bronze medalist(s)		Belgium	48.01

== See also ==
- 2023 Diamond League
