= 2019 Belgian Indoor Athletics Championships =

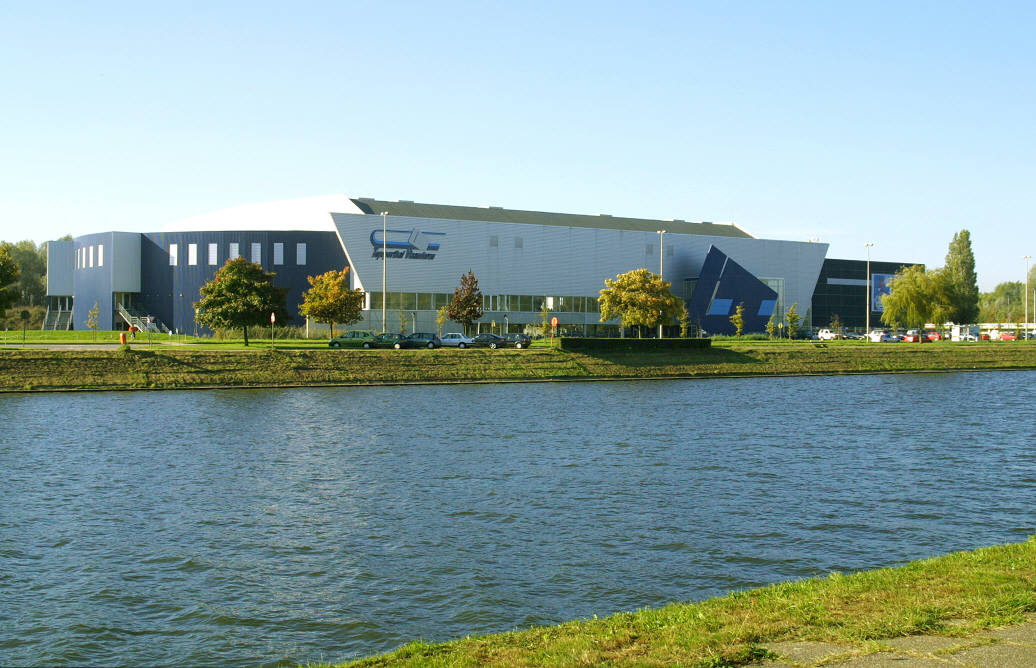
- The host stadium
- Dates: 17 February
- Host city: Ghent
- Venue: Flanders Sports Arena
- Events: 25

The 2019 Belgian Indoor Athletics Championships (Dutch: Belgische kampioenschappen indoor atletiek 2019, French: Championnats de Belgique d'athlétisme en salle 2019) was the year's national championship in indoor track and field for Belgium. It was held on Sunday 17 February at the Flanders Sports Arena in Ghent. A total of 25 events, 13 for men and 12 for women, were contested. It served as preparation for the 2019 European Athletics Indoor Championships.

== Results ==
=== Men ===
Event	Gold		Silver		Bronze	
60 metres	Guelord Kola Biasu	6.78	Kobe Vleminckx	6.79	Gaylord Kuba Di Vita	6.79
200 metres	Antoine Snyders	21.34	Camille Snyders	21.41	Jordan Pacquot	21.97
400 metres	Kevin Borlée	46.69	Julien Watrin	47.21	Dylan Borlée	47.68
800 metres	Aaron Botterman	1:48.02	Pieter Sisk	1:50.57	Quentin Kebron	1:51.30
1500 metres	Ali Hamdi	3:52.23	Kevin De Kerpel	3:52.36	Oussama Lonneux	3:53.71
3000 metres	Wesley De Kerpel	8:33.80	Mathijs Casteele	8:41.70	Dorian Fintolini	8:42.69
5000 m walk	Peter Van Hove	27:34.62	Tristan Van Hove	29:54.07	Not awarded	
60 m hurdles	Quentin Ruffacq	7.89	Sander Maes	7.96	Dario De Borger	7.96
Long jump	Corentin Campener	7.70 m	François Grailet	7.57 m	Mathias Broothaerts	7.34 m
Triple jump	Björn De Decker	15.27 m	Désiré Kingunza	14.48 m	Matthias De Leenheer	14.45 m
High jump	Thomas Carmoy	2.21 m	Bram Ghuys	2.19 m	Lars Van Looy	2.10 m
Pole vault	Ben Broeders	5.30 m	Frederik Ausloos	5.30 m	Bram Charle	4.90 m
Shot put	Philip Milanov	17.77 m	Matthias Quintelier	17.38 m	Max Vlassak	16.85 m

=== Women ===
Event	Gold		Silver		Bronze	
60 metres	Manon Depuydt	7.42	Rani Rosius	7.43	Elise Mehuys	7.46
200 metres	Lucie Ferauge	23.65	Imke Vervaet	23.74	Charlotte Duyck	24.55
400 metres	Cynthia Bolingo	52.70 NR	Camille Laus	53.22	Margo Van Puyvelde	54.68
800 metres	Camille Muls	2:06.50	Syrah Ghijselings	2:10.41	Hanne Pardaens	2:10.65
1500 metres	Anne Schreurs	4:28.61	Mathilde Deswaef	4:30.03	Eléa Henrard	4:30.42
3000 m walk	Annelies Sarrazin	16:08.17	Liesbet De Smet	17:46.60	Laura Ida Luna Hernandez	17:59.43
60 m hurdles	Eline Berings	8.06	Sarah Missinne	8.22	Angel Agwazie	8.35
Long jump	Hanne Maudens	6.53 m NR	Imke Vervaet	6.11 m	Cassandre Evans	5.93 m
Triple jump	Saliyya Guisse	13.17 m	Elsa Loureiro	12.71 m	Sietske Lenchant	12.55 m
High jump	Claire Orcel	1.90 m	Zita Goossens	1.77 m	Hanne Van Hessche	1.74 m
Pole vault	Aurélie De Ryck	4.30 m	Chloé Henry	4.25 m	Melanie Vissers	4.05 m
Shot put	Jolien Boumkwo	14.99 m	Yoika De Pauw	13.99 m	Anouska Hellebuyck	13.47 m
