= Manon Depuydt =

Belgian sprinter (born 1997)

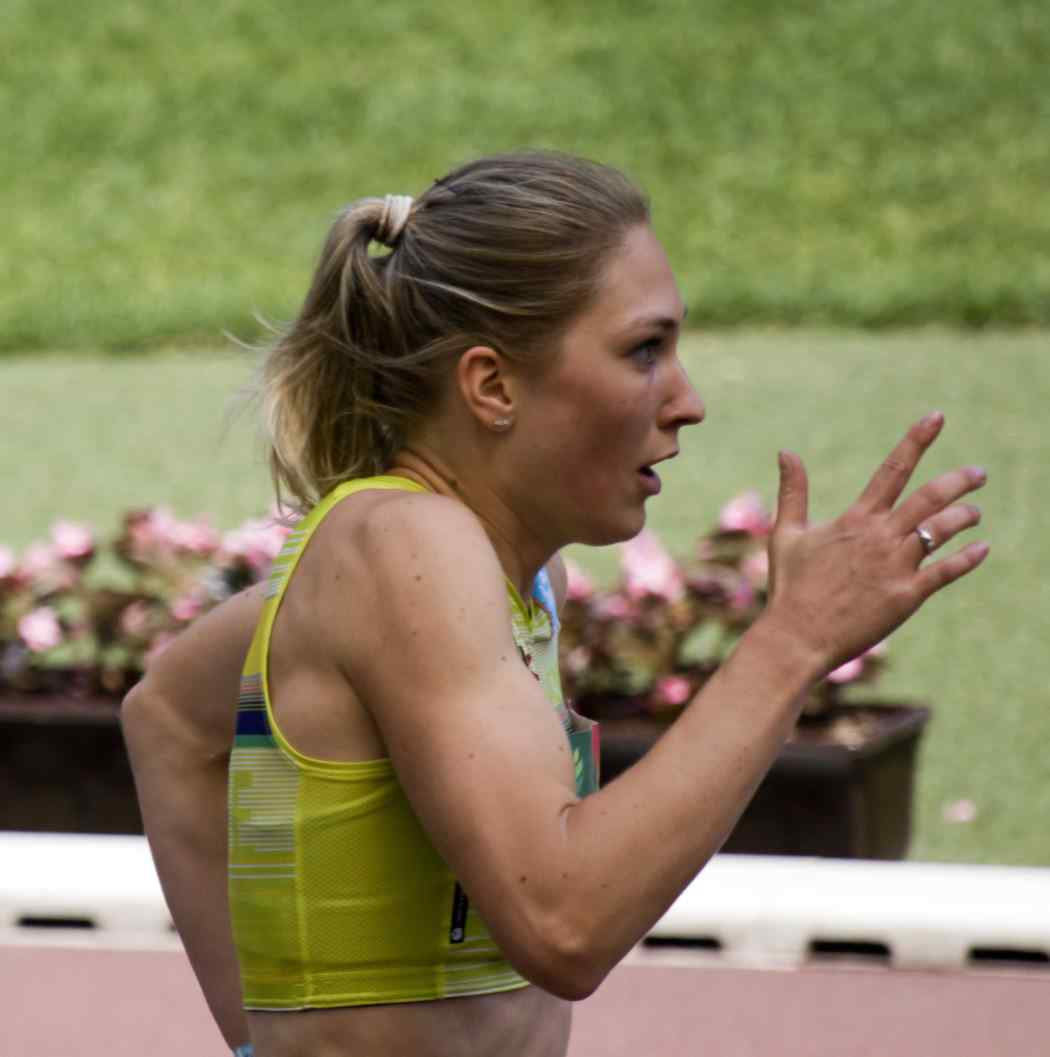
- Depuydt at the 2019 Belgian Athletics Championships, where she won the 100 m and finished 2nd in the 200 m

Personal information
- Nationality: Belgium
- Born: 2 April 1997 (age 29) Ostend, Belgium
- Home town: Klemskerke, De Haan, Ostend, Belgium

Sport
- Sport: Athletics
- Events: 60 metres, 200 metres
- Club: ACME
- Coached by: Marie-Christine Caron; Philip Gilson

Achievements and titles
- National finals: 2014 Belgian Champs; • 100m, 8th; 2014 Belgian Champs; • 200m, 4th; 2015 Belgian U20s; • 100m, 1st (gold); 2015 Belgian U20s; • 200m, 2nd (silver); 2016 Belgian Indoors; • 200m, 5th; 2016 Belgian Indoor U20s; • 60m, 1st (gold); 2016 Belgian Indoor U20s; • 200m, 1st (gold); 2016 Belgian Champs; • 200m, 3rd (bronze); 2017 Belgian Indoors; • 60m, 1st (gold); 2017 Belgian Champs; • 100m, 2nd (silver); 2017 Belgian Champs; • 200m, 2nd (silver); 2017 Belgian U23s; • 100m, 1st (gold); 2018 Belgian Indoors; • 60m, 1st (gold); 2018 Belgian Champs; • 100m, 1st (gold); 2019 Belgian Indoors; • 60m, 1st (gold); 2019 Belgian Indoor U23s; • 200m, 1st (gold); 2019 Belgian U23s; • 200m, 1st (gold); 2019 Belgian Champs; • 100m, 1st (gold); 2019 Belgian Champs; • 200m, 2nd (silver); 2020 Belgian Indoors; • 200m, 3rd (bronze); 2020 Belgian Champs; • 100m, 8th; 2021 Belgian Indoors; • 200m, 3rd (bronze); 2021 Belgian Champs; • 200m, 3rd (bronze); 2022 Belgian Champs; • 100m, 7th; 2023 Belgian Champs; • 200m, 4th
- Personal bests: 60m: 7.32 (2020); 200m (indoor): 23.59 (2020)
Medal record
Women's athletics
Representing Belgium
European Team Champs First Division
Third place	2017 Vaasa	4 × 100 m
First place	2019 Sandnes	4 × 100 m

Manon Depuydt (born 2 April 1997) is a Belgian sprinter. She is a three-time national champion outdoors and two-time indoor champion.

== Biography ==
Depuydt grew up in Klemskerke, a village in De Haan, Belgium within the arrondissement of Ostend. Her first major competition was at the 2013 European Youth Summer Olympic Festival, where she finished 5th in the 200 m. Depuydt was exposed to high-level competition from a young age, having competed in the youth sections of the 2013 Memorial Van Damme and 2014 BAUHAUS-galan Diamond League meetings.

Depuydt achieved her first senior national podium finish at the 2016 Belgian Athletics Championships, placing 3rd in the 200 m. The following year, she won the Belgian Indoor Athletics Championships 60 m. Depuydt did particularly well in her debut at the 2017 European Team Championships First League, placing third in the 4 × 100 m.

In 2018, Depuydt competed for the first time at the European Championships. In the women's 200 m, she advanced past the first round but was eliminated in the semifinals.

Depuydt improved markedly in 2019 and 2020, setting personal bests at every sprint distance from 60 m to 400 m. At the 2019 European U23 Championships, she advanced past the heats and semifinals of the 200 m to make her first international final, ultimately finishing 7th. She won her first international championship title at the 2019 European Athletics Team Championships, where she helped the Belgian team to a First League victory in the 4 × 100 m. At the 2019 World Athletics Championships, Depuydt was selected as part of the Belgian 4 × 400 m squad, but the Belgian team coach Carole Bam decided not to run her in the prelims or finals, saying that it was difficult to choose between her and Imke Vervaet.

== Statistics ==
=== Personal bests ===
Event	Mark	Competition	Venue	Date
60 metres (indoors)	7.32		Ghent, Belgium	22 February 2020
200 metres (indoors)	23.59		Ghent, Belgium	22 February 2020
