= 2021 Belgian Indoor Athletics Championships =

- Dates: 20 February
- Host city: Louvain-la-Neuve
- Venue: Complexe sportif de Blocry
- Events: 16

The 2021 Belgian Indoor Athletics Championships (Dutch: Belgische kampioenschappen indoor atletiek 2021, French: Championnats de Belgique d'athlétisme en salle 2021) was the year's national championship in indoor track and field for Belgium. It was held on Saturday 20 February at the Complexe sportif de Blocry in Louvain-la-Neuve. A total of 16 events, 8 for men and 8 for women, were contested. The competition was heavily affected by restrictions due to the COVID-19 pandemic, with several events abandoned due to lack of entries and all events having greatly reduced numbers of entries. The competition was not held before the public. In spite of restrictions, women's pole vaulter Fanny Smets broke the Belgian indoor record with a clearance of 4.53 m.

== Results ==
=== Men ===
Event	Gold		Silver		Bronze	
60 metres	Antoine Snyders	6.87	Camille Snyders	6.90	Raphael Kapenda	6.92
200 metres	Robin Vanderbemden	21.22	Antoine Snyders	21.42	Camille Snyders	21.58
400 metres	Alexander Doom	47.00	Christian Iguacel	47.16	Dylan Owusu	48.60
800 metres	Eliott Crestan	1:46.83	Only one entrant			
1500 metres	Ruben Verheyden	3:46.15	Tim Van de Velde	3:46.33	Oussama Lonneux	3:46.40
3000 metres	John Heymans	7:51.71	Michael Somers	7:52.67	Thomas Vanoppen	8:24.44
60 m hurdles	Nolan Vancauwemberghe	8.08	Only one entrant			
High jump	Thomas Carmoy	2.25 m	Only one entrant			

=== Women ===
Event	Gold		Silver		Bronze	
60 metres	Rani Rosius	7.39	Cassandre Evans	7.90	Only two entrants	
200 metres	Imke Vervaet	23.51	Justine Goossens	23.84	Manon Depuydt	23.99
400 metres	Cynthia Bolingo	52.72	Camille Laus	53.27	Hanne Maudens	53.52
800 metres	Renée Eykens	2:02.24	Elise Vanderelst	2:02.50	Mirte Fannes	2:04.68
60 m hurdles	Anne Zagré	8.09	Eline Berings	8.12	Noor Vidts	8.33
High jump	Merel Maes	1.91 m	Noor Vidts	1.77 m	Only two entrants	
Pole vault	Fanny Smets	4.53 m NR	Lola Lepère	3.95 m	Only two entrants	
Shot put	Cassandre Evans	12.72 m	Only one entrant			
