= Rani Rosius =

Belgian sprinter (born 2000)

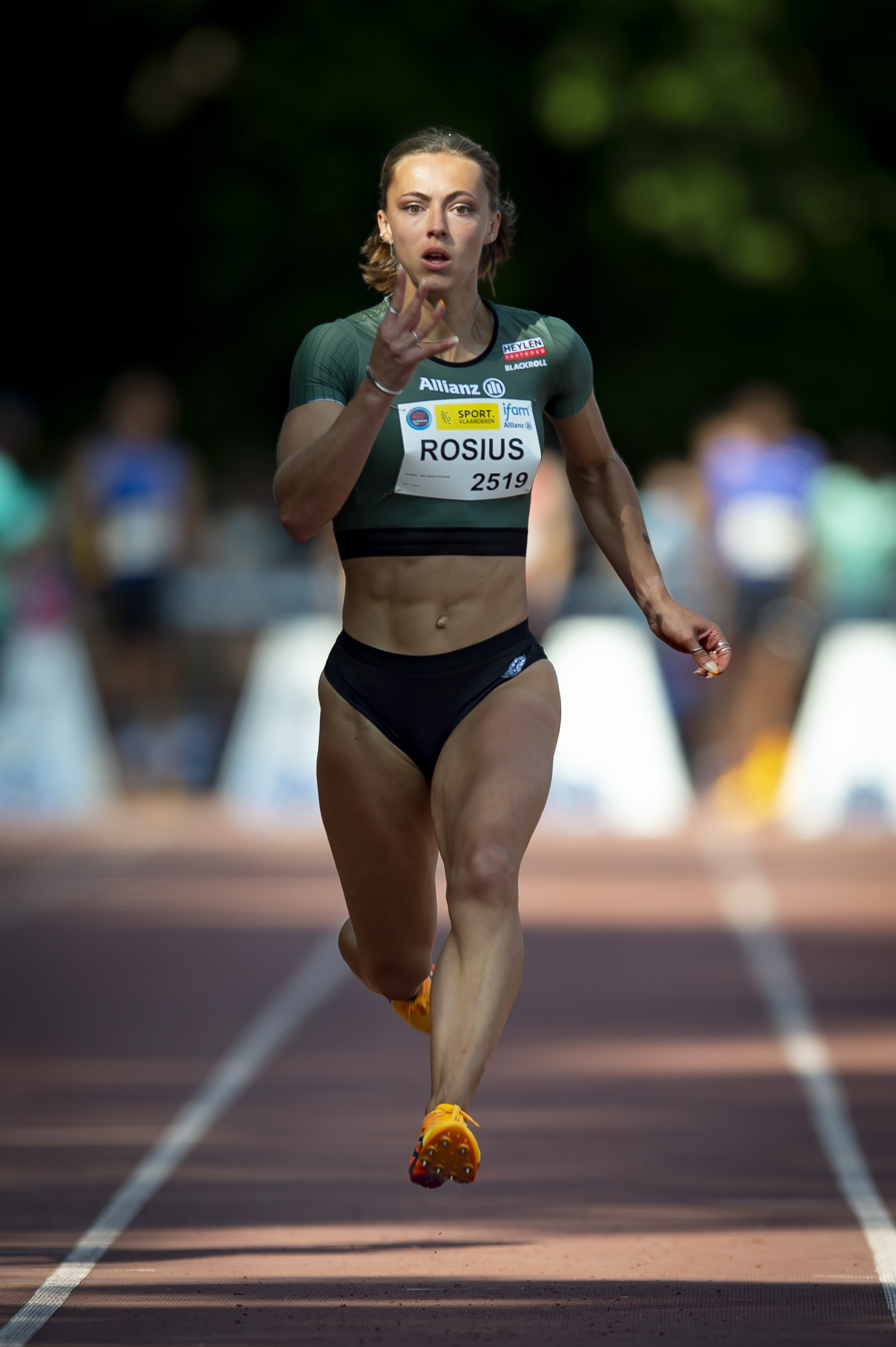
- Rosius in 2023

Personal information
- Nationality: Belgian
- Born: 25 April 2000 (age 26)

Sport
- Sport: Sprinting
- Events: 60 metres, 100 metres, 200 metres
Medal record
Representing Belgium
European Games
Silver medal – second place	2023 Kraków-Małopolska	100 m

Rani Rosius (born 25 April 2000) is a Belgian sprinter.

== Career ==
=== 2020 ===
At just 21 years of age, Rosius tied the second-best Belgian time ever on the 100 metres event, with a time of 11.39. Olivia Borlée ran the same time in 2007, while only Kim Gevaert has ever run faster, still holding the Belgian record at 11.04.

=== 2023 ===
Selected for the 2023 World Athletics Championships in Budapest, she qualified for the semi-final of the 100 metres.

=== 2024 ===
Early 2024 she reached the finals and finished 6th in the women's 60 metres at the 2024 World Athletics Indoor Championships in Glasgow. Later that year, she ran as part of the Belgian 4 × 100 m relay team at the 2024 World Relays Championships in Nassau, Bahamas that failed to qualify directly for the 2024 Summer Olympics. She represented Belgium at the 2024 European Athletics Championships in Rome in June 2024. Finishing 1st in her round 1 heat of the women's 100 metres, she advanced directly to the semi-finals where she finished 5th in her semi-final, not advancing to the final. She was also part of the Belgian 4 × 100 m relay team which qualified for the final and finished 6th. Having qualified for the women's 100 metres at the 2024 Summer Olympic Games via the World Athletics Rankings, she finished 4th in her round 1 heat posting a PB of 11.10s that allowed her to progress to the semi-finals as fastest athlete not directly qualified. She finished 8th in her semi-final. She also ran in the women's 4 × 100 metres relay, the Belgian team also having qualified for the 2024 Summer Olympic Games via the World Athletics Rankings. The team was however disqualified in round 1 when Elise Mehuys passed the baton to Delphine Nkansa outside the takeover zone.

=== 2025 ===
In March 2025, she broke Kim Gevaert's national record on the 60 m dash that had stood since 2007 in the semi-finals of the women's 60 metres at the 2025 European Athletics Indoor Championships in Apeldoorn, The Netherlands. She competed at the 2025 World Athletics Relays in China in the Women's 4 × 100 metres relay in May 2025. In June she was forced to stop competition for three weeks due to a sore achilles tendon.

=== 2026 ===
The persistent problem with her achilles tendon prevented Rosius from running pain free and at full strength during the indoor season. As a result, having reached the finals of the two previous World Athletics Indoor Championships, she did not even meet the qualifying standard for the 2026 World Athletics Indoor Championships in Toruń, Poland in March. After deciding to undergo ankle surgery, Rosius returned to competition in the summer and at the Meeting International d'Athlétisme de la Province de Liège met the European Athletic Association's entree time for the women's 100 metres at the 2026 European Athletics Championships in Birmingham, United Kingdom posting a time of 11.18s. At those championhips, she was eliminated in the semi-finals of the women's 100 metres and finished fifth with the Belgium team in the final of the women's 4 × 100 metres relay.

== Athletic Achievements ==
=== Personal bests ===
Type	Distance	Time (s)	Wind (m/s)	Venue	Date	Notes
Individual events
Indoor	60 metres	7.08	—N/a	Apeldoorn, Netherlands	9 March 2025	NR
Indoor	200 metres sh	23.67	—N/a	Gent, Belgium	1 February 2025	
Outdoor	100 metres	11.10	+0.8	Paris, France	2 August 2024	
Outdoor	200 metres	23.11	+1.0	Brussels, Belgium	30 June 2024	
Team events
Outdoor	4 × 100 metres relay	42.80	—N/a	Guangzhou, China	10 May 2025	

=== International competitions ===
Representing Belgium
Year	Competition	Venue	Position	Event	Time	Notes
2019	European U20 Championships	Borås, Sweden	—	4 × 100 m relay	DQ	TR24.7
2019	European Team Championships First League	Sandnes, Norway	1st	4 × 100 m relay	44.53	SB
2021	European Indoor Championships	Toruń, Poland	11th (sf)	60 m	7.29	
2021	European Team Championships First League	Cluj-Napoca, Romania	2nd	100 m	11.44	
2021	European Team Championships First League	Cluj-Napoca, Romania	5th	4 × 100 m relay	44.39	
2021	European U23 Championships	Tallinn, Estonia	2nd	100 m	11.43	
2021	European U23 Championships	Tallinn, Estonia	—	4 × 100 m relay	DQ	TR17.3.1
2022	World Indoor Championships	Belgrade, Serbia	28th (h)	60 m	7.33	
2022	European Championships	Munich, Germany	19th (sf)	100 m	11.53	
2022	European Championships	Munich, Germany	6th	4 × 100 m relay	43.98	
2023	European Indoor Championships	Istanbul, Turkey	4th	60 m	7.15	PB
2023	European Team Championships First Division	Chorzów, Poland	2nd	100 m	11.20	=PB
2023	World Championships	Budapest, Hungary	20th (sf)	100 m	11.20	
2024	World Indoor Championships	Glasgow, United Kingdom	6th	60 m	7.14	
2024	World Relays	Nassau, Bahamas	—	4 × 100 m relay	DQ	Re
2024	World Relays	Nassau, Bahamas	8th	4 × 100 m relay	43.17	
2024	European Championships	Rome, Italy	13th (sf)	100 m	11.25	
2024	European Championships	Rome, Italy	6th	4 × 100 m relay	43.48	
2024	Olympic Games	Paris, France	20th (sf)	100 m	11.29	
2024	Olympic Games	Paris, France	—	4 × 100 m relay	DQ	TR 24.7
2025	European Indoor Championships	Apeldoorn, Netherlands	5th	60 m	7.10	
2025	World Indoor Championships	Nanjing, China	7th	60 m	7.14	
2025	World Relays	Guangzhou, China	6th	4 × 100 m relay	42.85	
2025	World Championships	Tokyo, Japan	24th (h)	100 m	11.25	
2025	World Championships	Tokyo, Japan	—	4 × 100 m relay	DQ	TR 24.7
2026	European Championships	Birmingham, United Kingdom	9th (sf)	100 m	11.24	
2026	European Championships	Birmingham, United Kingdom	5th	4 × 100 m relay	43.31	

=== National championships and competitions ===
Year	Competition	Venue	Position	Event	Time	Notes
2016	Belgian U18 Championships	Herentals	5th	100 m	12.41	
2017	Belgian U18 Indoor Championships	Ghent	3rd	60 m	7.69	
2017	Belgian U18 Championships	Mouscron	3rd	100 m	11.90	
2018	Belgian Indoor Championships, U20 events	Ghent	1st	60 m	7.59	
2018	Belgian Championships, U20 events	Mouscron	4th	100 m	12.25	
2019	Belgian Indoor Championships	Ghent	2nd	60 m	7.43	
2019	Belgian Indoor Championships, U20 events	Ghent	2nd	200 m sh	24.66	
2019	Belgian Indoor Championships, U20 events	Ghent	1st	60 m	7.50	
2019	Belgian Championships, U20 events	Lebbeke	2nd	100 m	11.79	
2019	Belgian Championships	Brussels	2nd	100 m	11.67	
2019	Belgian Championships	Brussels	3rd	200 m	24.17	
2020	Belgian Indoor Championships	Ghent	2nd	60 m	7.37	
2020	Belgian U23 Indoor Championships	Louvain-la-Neuve	3rd	200 m sh	24.36	
2020	Belgian U23 Indoor Championships	Louvain-la-Neuve	1st	60 m	7.35	
2020	Belgian Championships	Brussels	2nd	100 m	11.39	
2020	Belgian Championships	Brussels	3rd	200 m	23.90	
2021	Belgian Indoor Championships	Louvain-la-Neuve	1st	60 m	7.39	
2021	Belgian Championships	Brussels	1st	100 m	11.39	
2021	Belgian Championships	Brussels	2nd	200 m	23.49	
2022	Belgian Indoor Championships	Louvain-la-Neuve	1st	60 m	7.35	
2022	Belgian Championships	Gentbrugge	1st	100 m	11.28	
2022	Belgian Championships	Gentbrugge	3rd	200 m	23.60	
2023	Belgian Indoor Championships	Ghent	1st	60 m	7.20	
2024	Belgian Indoor Championships	Louvain-la-Neuve	1st	60 m	7.20	
2024	Belgian Championships	Brussels	2nd	100 m	11.23	
2024	Belgian Championships	Brussels	2nd	200 m	23.11	
2025	Belgian Indoor Championships	Ghent	1st	60 m	7.20	
2025	Belgian Championships	Brussels	1st	100 m	11.27	
2026	Belgian Indoor Championships	Louvain-la-Neuve	1st	60 m	7.20	
2026	Belgian Championships	Kessel-Lo	3rd	100 m	11.22	
2026	Belgian Championships	Kessel-Lo	2nd	200 m	24.00	
