= Florent Mabille =

Belgian athlete (born 1996)

Personal information
- Nationality: Belgian
- Born: 27 October 1996 (age 29)

Sport
- Sport: Athletics
- Event: 400 m

Achievements and titles
- Personal bests: 400 m: 45.71 (Heusden-Zolder, 2023)
Medal record
Men's athletics
Representing Belgium
European Championships
Gold medal – first place	2024 Rome	4 × 400 m relay
European Indoor Championships
Bronze medal – third place	2025 Apeldoorn	4 × 400 m relay

Florent Mabille (born 27 October 1996) is a Belgian sprinter. In 2023, he became Belgian national champion over 400 metres indoors. He won a gold medal at the 2024 European Athletics Championships and a bronze medal at the 2025 European Athletics Indoor Championships.

== Career ==
=== 2023 ===
In February 2023, he won the 2023 Belgian Indoor Athletics Championships over 400 metres in Gent.

He lowered his 400 m personal best to 45.71 seconds in Heusden in May 2023. It was the tenth fastest time ever recorded by a Belgian at the distance. In July 2023, he finished as runner-up to Alexander Doom at the 2023 Belgian Athletics Championships in Bruges. He ran at the 2023 World Athletics Championships in Budapest, Hungary, in August 2023, in the Belgian mixed 4 × 400 m relay team, alongside Robin Vanderbemden, Imke Vervaet, and Camille Laus in the heat as they team qualified for the final and ultimately placed fifth overall.

=== 2024 ===
He ran as part of the Belgian mixed 4 × 400 m relay alongside Vervaet, Christian Iguacel, and Laus as the Belgian team qualified for the 2024 Paris Olympics, at the 2024 World Athletics Relays in Nassau, Bahamas.

He was a member of the Belgian men's 4 × 400 m relay team that won qualified for the final at the 2024 European Athletics Championships in Rome, Italy, running in the heat alongside Vanderbemden, Iguacel and Dylan Borlée as they qualified for the final and ultimately won the gold medal. He was a member of the Belgian men's 4 × 400 metres relay at the 2024 Summer Olympics alongside Jonathan Sacoor, Dylan Borlée, and Kevin Borlée, as they just missed out on a medal. Despite the team posting a national record in the final, it finished 4th for the 3rd straight Olympics.

=== 2025 ===
In March 2025, he won a bronze medal at the 2025 European Athletics Indoor Championships in Apeldoorn, The Netherlands as a member of the Belgium men's 4 × 400 m relay team alongside Sacoor, Iguacel and Julien Watrin. He competed at the 2025 World Athletics Relays in China in the Mixed 4 × 400 metres relay in May 2025. He was selected for the Belgian relay team for the 2025 World Athletics Championships in Tokyo, Japan.
