= Belgian Indoor Athletics Championships =

- Sport: Indoor track and field
- Founded: 1989
- Country: Belgium

The Belgian Indoor Athletics Championships (French: Championnats de Belgique d'athlétisme en salle, Dutch: Belgische kampioenschappen indoor atletiek) is an annual indoor track and field competition organised by the Royal Belgian Athletics League, which serves as the Belgian national championship for the sport. Typically held over two to three days in February during the Belgian winter, it was first added to the national calendar in 1989, supplementing the main outdoor Belgian Athletics Championships held in the summer since 1889. National championships in relay and combined track and field events are contested separately.

== Events ==
The following athletics events feature as standard on the Belgian Indoor Championships programme:

- Sprint: 60 m, 200 m, 400 m
- Distance track events: 800 m, 1500 m, 3000 m
- Hurdles: 60 m hurdles
- Jumps: long jump, triple jump, high jump, pole vault
- Throws: shot put
- Racewalking: 5000 m (men), 3000 m (women)
- Combined events: heptathlon (men), pentathlon (women)

== Editions ==
Year	Date	Venue	Location	Results
1989	29 January	Hall omnisports du Pas-de-Calais	Liévin, France	Results
1990	11 February	Flanders Sports Arena	Ghent	Results
1991	24 February	Flanders Sports Arena	Ghent	Results
1992	16 February	Flanders Sports Arena	Ghent	Results
1993	7 February	Flanders Sports Arena	Ghent	Results
1994	6 February	Flanders Sports Arena	Ghent	Results
1995	5 February	Flanders Sports Arena	Ghent	Results
1996	4 February	Flanders Sports Arena	Ghent	Results
1997	February	Flanders Sports Arena	Ghent	Results
1998	February	Flanders Sports Arena	Ghent	Results
1999	February	Stade Couvert Régional	Liévin, France	Results
2000	February	Stade Couvert Régional	Liévin, France	Results
2001	February	Flanders Sports Arena	Ghent	Results
2002	February	Flanders Sports Arena	Ghent	Results
2003	February	Flanders Sports Arena	Ghent	Results
2004	February	Flanders Sports Arena	Ghent	Results
2005	20 February	Flanders Sports Arena	Ghent	Results
2006	19 February	Flanders Sports Arena	Ghent	Results
2007	18 February	Flanders Sports Arena	Ghent	Results
2008	17 February	Flanders Sports Arena	Ghent	Results
2009	22 February	Flanders Sports Arena	Ghent	Results
2010	21 February	Flanders Sports Arena	Ghent	Results
2011	20 February	Flanders Sports Arena	Ghent	Results
2012	26 February	Flanders Sports Arena	Ghent	Results
2013	17 February	Flanders Sports Arena	Ghent	Results
2014	15 February	Flanders Sports Arena	Ghent	Results
2015	21 February	Flanders Sports Arena	Ghent	Results
2016	20 February	Flanders Sports Arena	Ghent	Results
2017	18 February	Flanders Sports Arena	Ghent	Results
2018	17 February	Flanders Sports Arena	Ghent	Results
2019	17 February	Flanders Sports Arena	Ghent	Results
2020	16 February	Flanders Sports Arena	Ghent	Results
2021	20 February	Complexe sportif de Blocry	Louvain-la-Neuve	Results
2022	26 February	Complexe sportif de Blocry	Louvain-la-Neuve	Results
2023	19 February	Flanders Sports Arena	Ghent	Results
2024	18 February	Complexe sportif de Blocry	Louvain-la-Neuve	
2025
2026	1 March	Complexe sportif de Blocry	Louvain-la-Neuve	Results

== Championships records ==
=== Men ===
Event	Record	Athlete/Team	Date	Meet	Place	Ref.
60 m	6.52 NR	Simon Verherstraeten	1 March 2026	2026 Championships	Louvain-La-Neuve	
800 m	46.15	Julien Watrin	26 February 2022	2022 Championships	Louvain-la-Neuve	
800 m	1:46.11	Elliot Crestan	26 February 2022	2022 Championships	Louvain-la-Neuve	
60 m hurdles	7.54 NR	Michael Obasuyi	18 February 2024	2024 Championships	Louvain-La-Neuve	
Shot put	18.92 m NR	Matthias Quintelier	26 February 2022	2022 Championships	Louvain-la-Neuve	

=== Women ===
Event	Record	Athlete/Team	Date	Meet	Place	Ref.
200 m	23.26 NR	Imke Vervaet	19 February 2023	2023 Championships	Ghent	
Pole vault	4.53 m NR	Fanny Smets	20 February 2021	2021 Championships	Louvain-la-Neuve	
Shot put	17.87 m NR	Jolien Boumkwo	19 February 2023	2023 Championships	Ghent	

== See also ==
- List of Belgian records in athletics
