= Ilona Masson =

Belgian athlete (born 2001)

Personal information
- Born: 31 August 2001 (age 24)

Sport
- Sport: Athletics
- Event: Triple jump

Achievements and titles
- Personal best: Triple jump: 14.52 m (2026)

Ilona Masson (born 31 August 2001) is a Belgian triple jumper. A former national under-23 record holder, she is a multiple-time senior national champion, winning titles indoors and outdoors.

== Biography ==
Masson won the senior Belgian Indoor Athletics Championships in February 2022, winning the triple jump in Louvain-La-Neuve with a jump of 12.91 metres.

Masson won the senior Belgian Athletics Championships in 2023, winning the triple jump in Brugge with a jump of 13.40 metres. That summer, Masson broke the Belgian under-23 record for the fourth time in two months when she jumped 13.69m at the Belgian U23 Championships. The following year proved to be full of setbacks and a struggle with allergies, an ankle injury in competition, and months out with back problems.

Masson won the Belgian Indoor Athletics Championships in February 2025, winning the triple jump in Ghent with a jump of 13.75 metres. This improved her personal best coming into the year by 1 cm.

In June 2025, she jumped over 14 metres for the first time; initially at a meeting in Athens, Greece, without a legal wind measurement (14.31 metres, before completing a new personal best jump of 14.06 metres whilst competing in Geneva, Switzerland. It was the sixth time she had improved her personal best that year. She represented Belgium at the 2025 European Athletics Team Championships Second Division in Maribor, Slovenia, placing fifth with a jump of 13.96 metres.

Masson was selected for the Belgian team for the 2025 World Athletics Championships in Tokyo, Japan, for her senior major championships debut, having qualified via her world ranking. She jumped 13.79 metres at the championships, without advancing to the final.

In July 2026, at the Meeting National de Thonon-Les-Bains in France, Masson jumped a huge personal best of 14.52 metres. A month later, she jumped 13.77 metres to win the 2026 Belgian Indoor Championships. In August, she placed fourth at the 2026 European Athletics Championships in Birmingham, England, with her best jump of 14.37m three centimetres from the medal positions.

== Personal life ==
She is from Hannut in the province of Liège, Belgium. She is the daughter of two athletes, former Belgian national champion 400 metres Frédéric Masson and former Belgian 100 meter hurdles runner Carine Boux. She holds a Master's degree in physiotherapy from the Haute École de la Province de Liège.
