= Merel Maes =

Belgian athlete (born 2005)

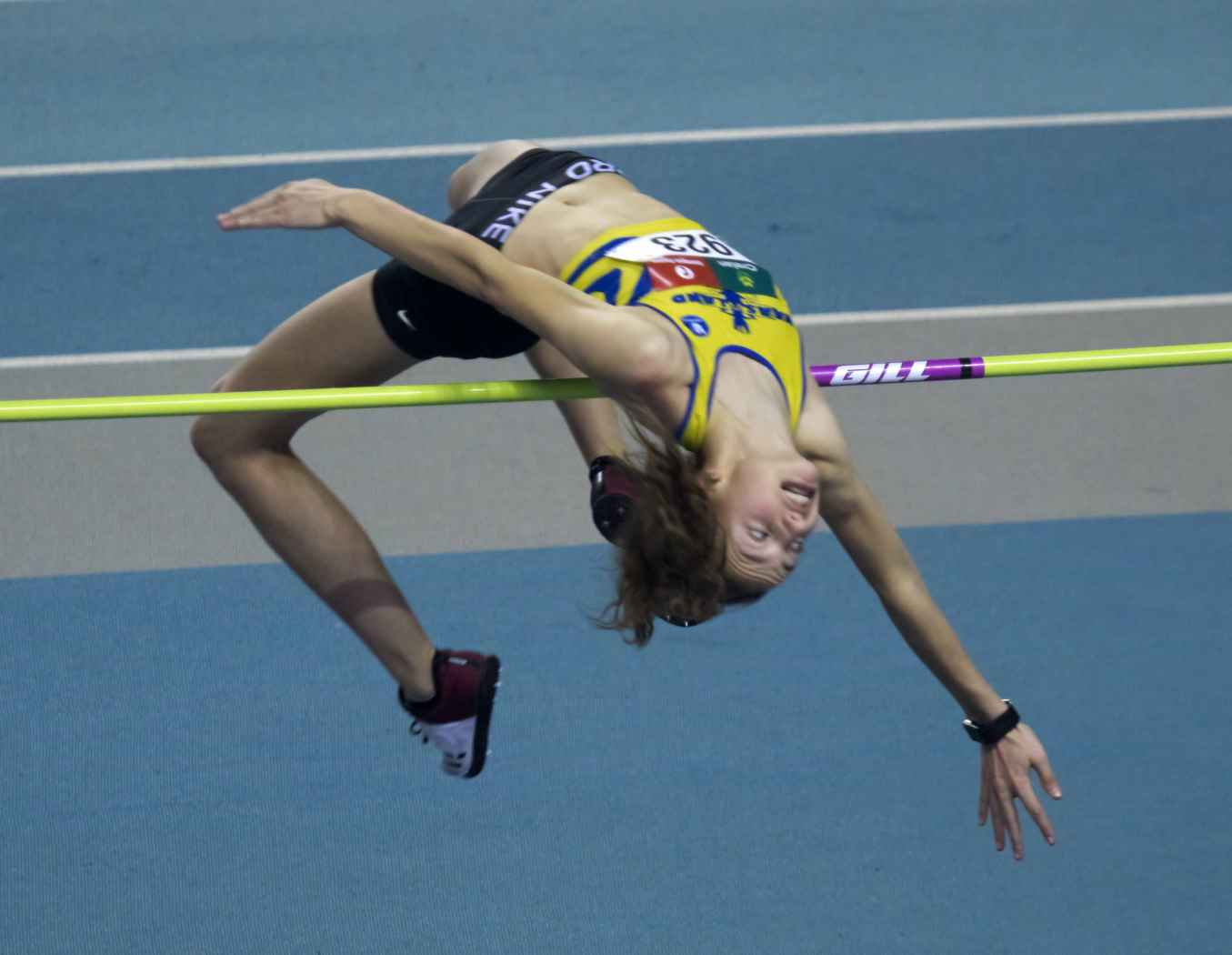

Personal information
- Nationality: Belgian
- Born: 22 January 2005 (age 21)

Sport
- Sport: Athletics
- Event: High jump

Achievements and titles
- Personal bests: High jump: 1.93m (Kortrijk, 2023)
Medal record
Women's athletics
Representing Belgium
European U18 Championships
Bronze medal – third place	2022 Jerusalem	High jump

Merel Maes (born 22 January 2005) is a Belgian high jumper. She is a multiple-time national champion.

== Early life ==
A keen footballer from the age of seven, she played as a full back for East Flemish provincial team Vrasene. She started the high jump in 2017.

== Career ==
In August 2020 as a 15-year-old, she won the Belgian Athletics Championships title in the high jump for the first time, setting a Belgian U16 record of 1.79 metres. In February 2021, whilst still 16 years-old, she won the high jump at the 2021 Belgian Indoor Athletics Championships with a personal best height of 1.91 metres. This was a 10 cm improvement from her 1.81m best in 2020. She was the youngest competitor at the 2021 European Athletics Indoor Championships in Toruń in March.

She was runner-up at the Belgian Athletics Championships in Brussels in June 2021, with a height of 1.88 metres. She finished fifth at the 2021 World Athletics U20 Championships in Nairobi with a 1.84m clearance.

She finished third at the Belgian Championships in Gentbrugge in June 2022, clearing 1.82 metres. She won bronze at the 2022 European Athletics U18 Championships in Jerusalem with a height of 1.86 metres. She finished fifth at the 2022 World Athletics U20 Championships in Cali, Colombia with a height of 1.88 metres.

In February 2023, she won the high jump at the 2023 Belgian Indoor Athletics Championships in Ghent. She finished second in the Division I high jump competition at the 2023 European Athletics Team Championships in Silesia in June 2023, equalling her personal best of 1.92 metres and only losing on count back to Nawal Meniker of France. In July 2023, she equaled the Belgian U20 record set by Sabrina De Leeuw in 1993, with a 1.93m clearance in Kortrijk. She finished sixth at the 2023 European Athletics U20 Championships in Jerusalem. She won the Belgian national title again in July 2023 clearing a height of 1.80 metres in poor weather conditions in Bruges.

In August 2023, she made her senior major global championship debut, at the age of 18 years-old, at the 2023 World Athletics Championships in Budapest. She cleared a height of 1.89 metres without qualifying for the final.

She was selected for the 2024 European Athletics Championships in Rome in June 2024.

In June 2025, she won the high jump competition to help Belgium achieve promotion at the 2025 European Athletics Team Championships Second Division in Maribor. She was a finalist in September at the 2025 World Athletics Championships in Tokyo, Japan, placing tenth overall with a clearance of 1.93 metres in the final.

In August 2026, she was a finalist at the 2026 European Athletics Championships in Birmingham, England. At the 2026 Diamond League Final in Brussels in September, she placed seventh with a jump of 1.84 metres.
