= Yanni Sampson =

Belgian long jumper (born 2004)

Personal information
- Born: 7 October 2004 (age 21)

Sport
- Sport: Athletics
- Event: Long jump

Achievements and titles
- Personal best: Long jump: 8.02 m (2026)

Yanni Sampson (born 7 October 2004) is a Belgian long jumper. He is a multiple-time national champion.

== Biography ==
From Flémalle, he is a member of RFCL Athlétisme in Liège. Sampson became Belgian long jump champion for the first time at the 2023 Belgian Athletics Championships as an 18 year-old, and represented Belgium at the 2023 European Athletics Team Championships in Chorzow, Poland.

In February 2024 he won the Belgian Indoor Championships title and competing outdoors that summer he retained his Belgian title with a new personal best jump of 7.54 metres. In 2025, he again won Belgian long jump titles both indoors and outdoors, and represented Belgium at the 2025 European Athletics Team Championships in Maribor, Slovenia.

In July 2026, he set a new personal best of 8.02 metres while competing in Thonon-les-Bains, France. On 10 August 2026, he qualified for the final of the 2026 European Championships in Birmingham, jumping 7.91 m with his first jump and improving to 7.97 m in the preliminary heat. At the 2026 Diamond League Final in Brussels in September, he finished sixth with 7.82 metres.
