= Flanders Sports Arena =

Sporting venue

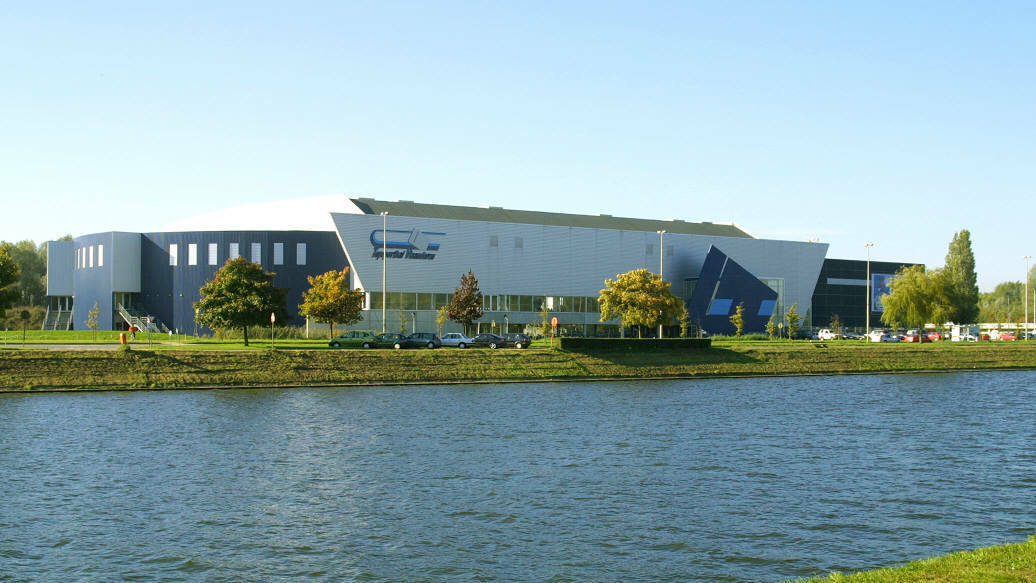
- Flanders Sports Arena in 2015
- Interactive map of Flanders Sports Arena
- Location: Ghent, Belgium
- Coordinates: 51°2′55.96″N 3°41′8.04″E
- Operator: Sport Vlaanderen Gent
- Capacity: 5,000 (sport)

Construction
- Opened: 2000
- Architects: Van Acker B. & Partners

The Flanders Sports Arena (Dutch: Topsporthal Vlaanderen) is a multi-purpose indoor arena in Ghent, Belgium. Opened in 2000, the Flanders Sports Arena can hold up to 5,000 people in sporting events.

It was realized through a public-private partnership between the Flemish Government, Bloso, the provincial Government of East Flanders, Flanders Expo and the city council of Ghent. The venue is managed by agency Sport Vlaanderen Ghent.

== Facilities ==
The hall has 3,539 seats which, if required, can be expanded to more than 5,000 seats. This accommodation has a fixed athletics track with 6 lanes of 200 meters. The central area has an area of 2150 m^{2} that can be increased to 3000 m^{2}. It is used for other athletic disciplines such as 60-meter sprint, high jump, long jump, hop jump, pole vault and shot put. In the winter the emphasis is mainly on athletics. In addition, this accommodation is also suitable for the organization of other (top) sporting events and competitions.

== Events ==
Since it was opened in 2000, the arena has hosted the annual Indoor Flanders meeting, an indoor track and field competition. It hosted the 2001 World Artistic Gymnastics Championships and the 2000 European Athletics Indoor Championships.

== See also ==
- List of indoor arenas in Belgium

Preceded by Palau Velódrom Lluís Puig; Valencia	European Indoor Championships in Athletics; Venue; 2000	Succeeded by Ferry-Dusika-Hallenstadion; Vienna
