= Amine Kasmi =

Belgian sprinter (born 2000)

Personal information
- Born: 25 June 2000 (age 26)

Sport
- Sport: Athletics
- Event: Sprint
Medal record
Men's athletics
Representing Belgium
European Championships
Bronze medal – third place	2026 Birmingham	4 × 100 m relay

Amine Kasmi (born 25 June 2000) is a Belgian sprinter. He won the bronze medal with the Belgium men's 4 × 100 m relay team at the 2026 European Championships.

== Biography ==
A member of Excelsior Bruxelles from an early age, Kasmi placed third over 100 metres at the 2025 Belgian Athletics Championships. He had previously represented Belgium at the 2025 European Athletics Team Championships and was included that year in the Belgium relay pool for the 2025 World Championships in Tokyo.

Kasmi was selected to compete for Belgium at the 2026 European Athletics Championships in Birmingham, England. On 15 August, he ran in the preliminary round for the Belgian team that won the bronze medal in the men's 4 × 100 m relay.
