= Saliyya Guisse =

Belgian triple jumper

Personal information
- Nationality: Belgian
- Born: 8 July 1996 (age 30) Brussels, Belgium

Sport
- Sport: Track and Field
- Event: Triple jump
- Club: Belgium: Royal Excelsior Sports Club Brussels; France:Entente Sambre Avesnois 59*
- Coached by: Marilyn Milants
Medal record
Women's athletics
Representing Belgium
European Championships
Silver medal – second place	2026 Birmingham	Triple jump

Saliyya Guisse (born 8 July 1996) is a Belgian athlete specializing in triple jump. In the 2026 European Athletics Championships she won the silver medal. At the time this was the best ever result of a Belgian triple jumper in an international competition, bettering the bronze medal of Svetlana Bolshakova in the 2010 European Athletics Championships.

== Career ==
Guisse won six Belgian triple jump championship titles, 3 indoor and 3 outdoor. Indoor, she became the Belgian triple jump champion for the first time in 2018. The following year, she successfully defended the title. In 2024, she won the indoor title for the third time. Outdoor, she became the Belgian triple jump champion for the first time in 2022. She won the title for a second time in 2024. In 2025, she won the outdoor title for the third time.

Guisse represented Belgium at the 2023 European Athletics Team Championships First Division in Chorzów, Poland. She never qualified for an international individual competition until, at age 30, she was chosen to represent Belgium at the 2026 European Athletics Championships in Birmingham, Great Britain. Having entered the competition with a personal best of 13.97 metres set at the Belgian Athletics Championships a fortnight earlier, she qualified for the finale with her first ever jump over 14.00 metres.. In the final she surprised everyone by bettering her personal best with nearly 40 centimeters and taking the silver medal. As an amateur without a contract with Belgian Athletics, Guisse credited her success as the result of a close-knit family team: during her whole career her mother was her head coach and technical coach, her father oversaw her sprint and strength training, her partner—former pole vaulter Arnaud Art—often trained alongside her and her sister was one of her physiotherapists.

== Personal life ==
Guisse is the partner of Belgium pole vaulter Arnaud Art. In January 2025 Guisse, became the sporting patron of the Erasmus Fund's sporting events. The Erasmus Fund fosters and supports the development of research and medical advances at the Erasmus Hospital in Anderlecht, Brussels, Belgium, for the benefit of all..

== Honours ==
- Sporting ambassador of Waterloo, Belgium
