= Tibo De Smet =

Belgian middle-distance runner

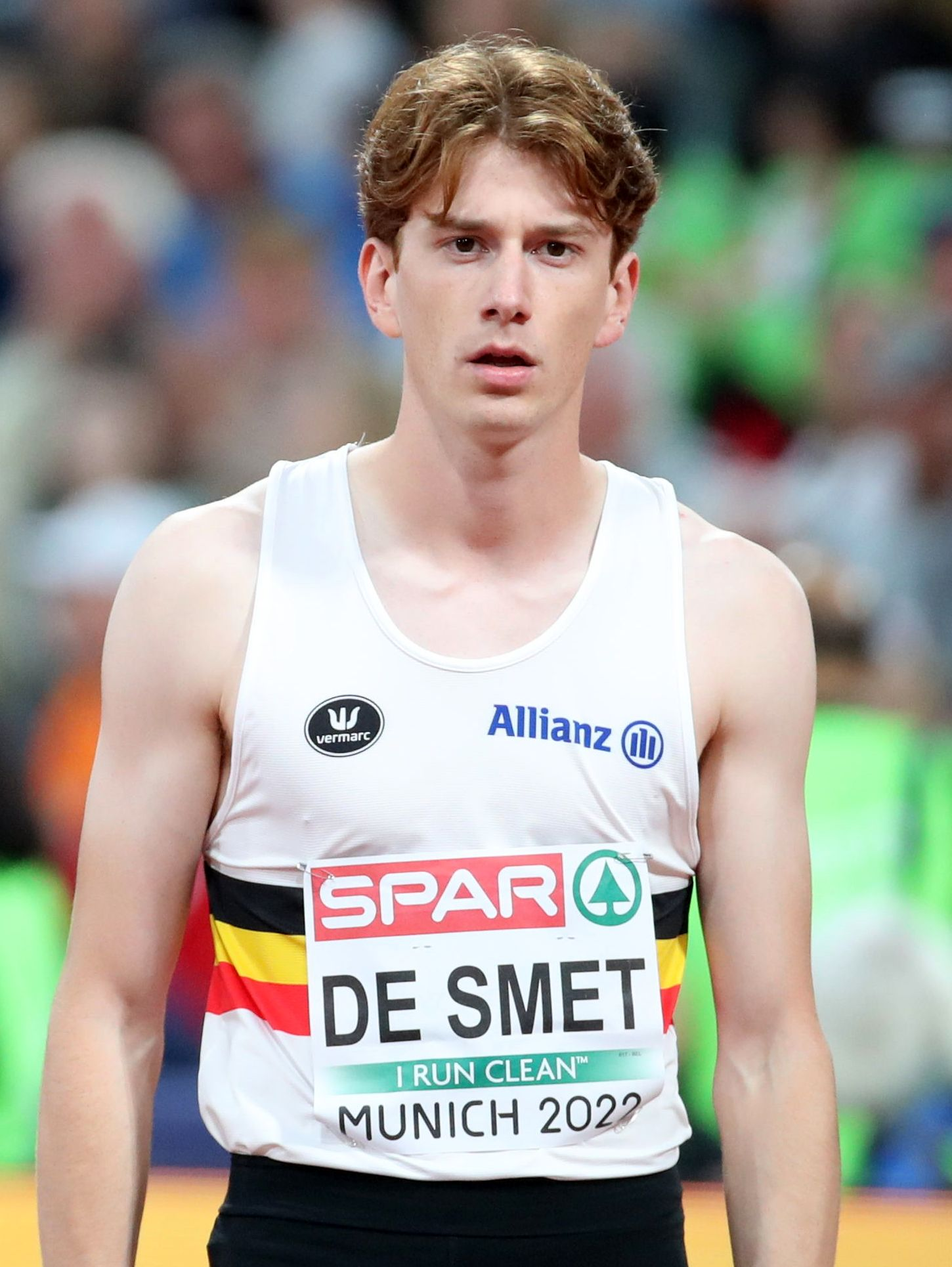
- De Smet in 2022

Personal information
- Nationality: Belgian
- Born: 28 May 1999 (age 26)

Sport
- Country: Belgium
- Sport: Track and field
- Event(s): 400 m, 800 m, 1500 m
- Club: Racing Club Gent Atletiek
- Coached by: Tine Bex

Tibo De Smet (born 28 May 1999) is a Belgian middle-distance runner, who specializes in the 800 metres.

De Smet set a new Belgian indoor 800 meters record in Luxembourg in January 2023, breaking Eliott Crestan's record with a time of 1:45.04. This was also the 25th fastest all time indoor 800 m. He also won the same event at the 2022 Belgian Athletics Championships. De Smet participated at the 2024 Summer Olympics in Paris, France where he was eliminated after finishing 7th in the heats and 4th in the repechage.

== Personal bests ==
Outdoor

- 400 m: 46.33 (Oordegem 2023)
- 800 m: 1:44.53 (Ninove 2023)
- 1500 m: 3:47.93 (Leuven 2021)

Indoor

- 400 m: 46.59 (Ghent 2023)
- 800 m: 1:45.04 (Luxembourg 2023)
