= Pieter Sisk =

Belgian middle-distance runner

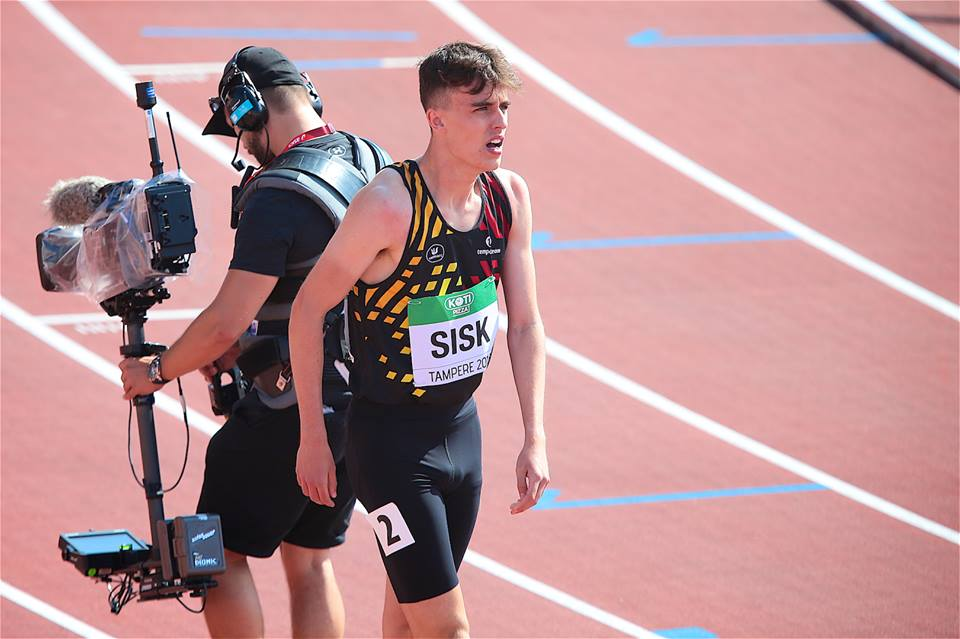
- Sisk in 2019

Personal information
- Nationality: Belgian
- Born: 8 December 1999 (age 26) Leuven, Belgium
- Height: 1.91 m (6 ft 3 in)

Sport
- Country: Belgium
- Sport: Track and field
- Events: 800m, 1500m, 3000m
- Club: Daring Club Leuven Atletiek
- Coached by: Ivo Hendrix

Pieter Sisk (born 8 December 1999) is a Belgian middle-distance runner, who specializes in the 800 metres.

== Career ==
=== 2024 ===
Sisk qualified for the 800 meters at the 2024 Summer Olympics with his time of 1:44.46, which he ran in Brussels on 25 May 2024. At the Olympics, he failed to qualify for the semi-finals after finishing 6th in the heats and 3rd in the repechages.

=== 2026 ===
In January 2026, Sisk met the qualifying time for the 2026 World Athletics Indoor Championships in Toruń, Poland at the CMCM Indoor Meeting in Luxembourg, ran a European record over the unusual distance of 2000 metres at the New Balance Indoor Grand Prix 2026 in Boston, Massachusetts, and set a Belgian indoor record for the mile that was faster even than the Belgian outdoor record for that distance at the time. In March, he was eliminated in round 1 of the 2026 World Athletics Indoor Championships in Toruń, Poland and in August he suffered the same fate in round 1 of the 2026 European Athletics Championships in Birmingham, England.

== Personal bests ==
- 800 meters – 1:43.48 (Lausanne 2024)
  - 800 metres indoor – 1:46.10 (Apeldoorn 2024)
- 1000 metres – 2:15.29 (Oordegem 2025) NR
  - 1000 metres indoor – 2:17.17 (Ghent 2024) NR
- 1500 meters – 3:31.85 (Paris 2025)
  - 1500 metres indoor – 3:33.32+ (Boston 2026) NR
- 1 mile – 3:50.31 (Boston 2025) NR
  - 1 mile indoor – 3:50.31 (Boston 2025) NR
- 2000 meters indoor – 4:52.41 (Boston 2025) ABP, NR
- 3000 meters – 7:51.07 (Herentals 2023)
