= Jochem Vermeulen =

Belgian middle-distance runner

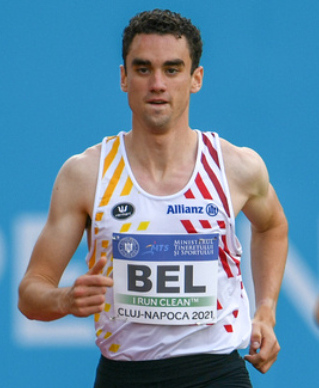
- Vermeulen in 2021

Personal information
- Nationality: Belgian
- Born: 2 August 1998 (age 28)

Sport
- Country: Belgium
- Sport: Track and field
- Event: 1500 metres
- Coached by: Rik Didden

Achievements and titles
- Personal bests: Outdoor; 800 m: 1:46.38 (Heusden-Zolder 2022); 1500 m: 3:31.74 (Lausanne 2024) NR; Mile: 3:51.00 (London 2024) NR; Indoor; 800 m: 1:52.08 (Ghent 2016); 1500 m: 3:36.17 (Boston 2025); Mile: 3:59.32 (Boston 2023)
Medal record
Representing Belgium
European Championships
Silver medal – second place	2024 Rome	1500 metres

Jochem Vermeulen (born 2 August 1998) is a Belgian middle-distance runner, who specializes in the 1500 metres.

== Career ==
Vermeulen placed 4th over 1500 m at the 2019 Belgian Championships.

In 2021, Vermeulen ran a new PB of 3:35.21 at the KBC Night of Athletics. Also in 2021, He made his Diamond League debut at the Memorial van Damme.

He won the 1500 m at the 2023 Belgian Indoor Athletics Championships

He competed at the 2023 World Championships in the 1500 m, he finished 9th in his heat and did not progress to the semifinals.

In 2024, he won the silver medal at the 2024 European Championships, finishing in a new PB of 3:33.60, behind Jakob Ingebrigtsen. With that PB, Vermeulen qualified for the 2024 Summer Olympics in Paris, France. At those Olympics, Vermeulen, 7th in his heat and 6th in the repechages, failed to qualify for the semi-finals. Later that month, on August 22, he broke the 1500 metres national record at the Athletissima Diamond League meeting in Lausanne, Switzerland posting a time of 3:31.74 meeting the qualification criterium for the 2025 World Athletics Championships in Tokyo, Japan.

In February 2025, he broke the 1500 metres national indoor record at the New Balance Indoor Grand Prix leg of the 2025 World Athletics Indoor Tour Gold meeting in Boston, Massachusetts. Early March he represented Belgium at the 2025 European Athletics Indoor Championships in Apeldoorn, The Netherlands, but plagued by injury he was eliminated in the first round of the 1500 metres. He made his return to competition in mid August at the Belgian national championships a month before the 2025 World Athletics Championships. At those championships he was eliminated in the heats.

Vermeulen started off 2026 well, running personal bests in February at the Gold Level World Athletics Indoor Tour Meetings in Karlsruhe, Germany and Liévin, France. In March he represented Belgium at the 2026 World Athletics Indoor Championships in Torun, Poland where he was eliminated in the heats of the 1500 metres. His outdoor season was again marred by injury, his first race being the Belgian championships in late July. Having failed to meet Belgian Athletics qualification time, he was nonetheless selected by Belgian Athletics as he had met European Athletics' criteria. At the 2026 European Athletics Championships, he was eliminated in the first round.

== Personal life ==
Vermeulen joined the Kapé Athletics Club at six years old.

Outside of athletics, Vermeulen is a physiotherapist.
