= Belgian Athletics Championships =

Annual track and field competition

- Sport: Track and field
- Founded: 1889
- Country: Belgium

The Belgian Athletics Championships (Dutch: Belgische kampioenschappen atletiek; French: Championnats de Belgique d'athlétisme) is an annual outdoor track and field competition organised by the Royal Belgian Athletics League, which serves as the national championship for the sport in Belgium.

Typically organised in July in Brussels, the event was first held in 1889 and introduced the first events for women in 1921. The competition was not held in the years from 1915 to 1918 due to World War I and also did not take place in 1940 and 1944 due to World War II.

Separate annual championship events are held for the 10,000 metres, relay races, combined track and field events, cross country running and the road running and racewalking events. There is also a Belgian Indoor Athletics Championships and an outdoor Belgian club championships.

== Events ==
The competition programme features a total of 34 individual Belgian Championship athletics events, 17 for men and 17 for women. There are six track running events, three obstacle events, four jumps, and four throws.

Track running

- 100 metres, 200 metres, 400 metres, 800 metres, 1500 metres, 5000 metres

Obstacle events

- 100 metres hurdles (women only), 110 metres hurdles (men only), 400 metres hurdles, 3000 metres steeplechase

Jumping events

- Pole vault, high jump, long jump, triple jump

Throwing events

- Shot put, discus throw, javelin throw, hammer throw

Men competed in a 200 metres hurdles until 1964, by which point the event had fallen out of favour in international competitions. The women's programme was gradually expanded from the 1960s onwards, with the 1500 m appearing in 1969, the 3000 m in 1973, triple jump in 1991, hammer throw and pole vault in 1995, and steeplechase in 2001. The women's hurdles events gradually changed too: the 80 metres hurdles became the 100 m version in 1969, a 200 m version was held from 1969 to 1975, then the women's 400 m hurdles began in 1976. The women's combined event was the athletics pentathlon up to 1980 and the 3000 metres was extended to match the men's 5000 m distance in 1995.

== Editions ==
Year	Date	Venue
1889		Brussels (Velodrome La Cambre)
1890		Brussels
1891		Brussels
1892		Brussels
1893		Brussels
1894		Brussels
1895		Brussels
1896		Brussels
1897	June 30	Anderlecht (Wielerbaan Brussels South)
1898	October 9	Brussels (Cinquantenaire)
1899	June 11	Brussels (Cinquantenaire)
1900	July 1	Forest (United SC)
1901		
1902		
1903	August 7	Brussels (Wielerbaan La Cambre)
1904	July 3	Brussels (Wielerbaan La Cambre)
1905	June 25	Brussels (Wielerbaan La Cambre)
1906	July 1	Brussels
1907	July 7	Uccle (Leopold Club)
1908	August 2	Uccle (Leopold Club)
1909	June 27	Uccle (The Goose Pond)
1910	June 19	Forest (Excelsior)
1911	June 25	Uccle (Leopold Club)
1912	June 30	Uccle (The Goose Pond)
1913	June 29	Ghent
1914	June 28	Antwerp (Beerschot)
1919	August 3	
1920		
1921		
1922		
1923		
1924		
1925		
1926		
1927	10 and 17 July	Antwerp
1928	1 and 8 July	Brussels
1929	14 and 21 July	Ghent
1930	6 and 13 July	Antwerp
1931	5 and 12 July	Liege
1932		
1933	July 9	Antwerp (Olympic Stadium)
1934	July 8	Antwerp (Olympic Stadium)
1935	July 7	Antwerp (Olympic Stadium)
1936	July 5	Antwerp (Olympic Stadium)
1937	July 25	Brussels (Heysel Stadium)
1938		Antwerp (Beerschot)
1939		Antwerp (Beerschot)
1941		Antwerp (Beerschot)
1942	August 2	Antwerp (Olympic Stadium)
1943	July 25	Antwerp (Olympic Stadium)
1945		Antwerp (Beerschot)
1946	July 28	Antwerp (Olympic Stadium)
1947		
1948		
1949		
1950		
1951	21–22 July	Brussels
1952	28–29 June	Antwerp
1953	11–12 July	Brussels
1954	7–8 August	Brussels
1955	9–10 July	Brussels (Heysel)
1956	4–5 August	Brussels (Heysel)
1957	3–4 August	Brussels (Heysel)
1958	2–3 August	Brussels (Heysel)
1959	1–2 August	Brussels (Heysel)
1960	30–31 July	Brussels (Heysel)
1961	29–30 July	Brussels (Heysel)
1962	14–15 July	Brussels (Heysel)
1963	July 28	Leuven (sports)
1964	1–2 August	Brussels (Heysel)
1965	7–8 August	Brussels (Heysel)
1966	6–7 August	Brussels (Heysel)
1967	5–6 August	Brussels (Heysel)
1968	3–4 August	Brussels (Heysel)
1969	2–3 August	Brussels (Heysel)
1970	8–9 August	Brussels
1971	July 31 and August 1	Brussels
1972	5–6 August	Brussels
1973	1–19 August	Brussels
1974	2–4 August	Brussels
1975	8–10 August	Brussels
1976	20–22 August	Brussels
1977	8–10 July	Brussels
1978	4–6 August	Brussels (Heysel)
1979	10–12 August	Brussels (Heysel)
1980	910 –August	Brussels
1981	8–9 August	Brussels
1982	7–8 August	Brussels
1983	23–24 July	Brussels
1984	7–8 July	Brussels
1985	3–4 August	Brussels
1986	9–10 August	Brussels
1987	31 July–2 August	Brussels
1988	2–4 September	Brussels
1989	28–30 July	Leuven–Heverlee
1990	8–9 September	Naimette-Xhovémont
1991	3–4 August	Brussels
1992	15–16 August	Brussels
1993	24–25 July	Brussels
1994	15–17 July	Brussels
1995	15–16 July	Oordegem
1996	10–11 August	Oordegem
1997	5–6 July	Brussels (King Baudouin Stadium)
1998	18–19 July	Brussels
1999	17–18 July	Brussels
2000	29–30 July	Brussels
2001	June 30–July 1	Brussels
2002	6–7 July	Brussels
2003	9–10 August	Jambes
2004	10–11 July	Brussels
2005	9–10 July	Brussels
2006	8–9 July	Brussels
2007	4–5 August	Brussels
2008	5–6 July	Naimette-Xhovémont
2009	1–2 August	oordegem
2010	17–18 July	Brussels
2011	23–24 July	Brussels
2012	16–17 June	Brussels
2013	20–21 July	Brussels
2014	26–27 July	Brussels
2015	25–26 July	Brussels
2016	25–26 June	Brussels
2017	1–2 July	Brussels
2018	7–8 July	Brussels
2019	31 August–1 September	Brussels (King Baudouin Stadium)
2020	14–16 August	Brussels (King Baudouin Stadium)
2021	26–27 June	Brussels (King Baudouin Stadium)
2022	24–26 June	Gentbrugge (Wouter Weylandt Atletiekstadion)
2023	29–30 July	Bruges (Sportcentrum Julien Saelens)
2024	29–30 June	Brussels (King Baudouin Stadium)
2025	2–3 August	Brussels (King Baudouin Stadium)
2026	25–26 July	Kessel-Lo (Leuven)

== Championships records ==
=== Men ===
Event	Record	Athlete/Team	Date	Place	Ref.
100 m					
200 m					
Pole vault					

=== Women ===
Event	Record	Athlete/Team	Date	Place	Ref.
100 m					
10000 m	30:51.18 NR	Jana Van Lent	6 June 2026	Louvain-la-Neuve	
