= Jolien Boumkwo =

Belgian athletics competitor

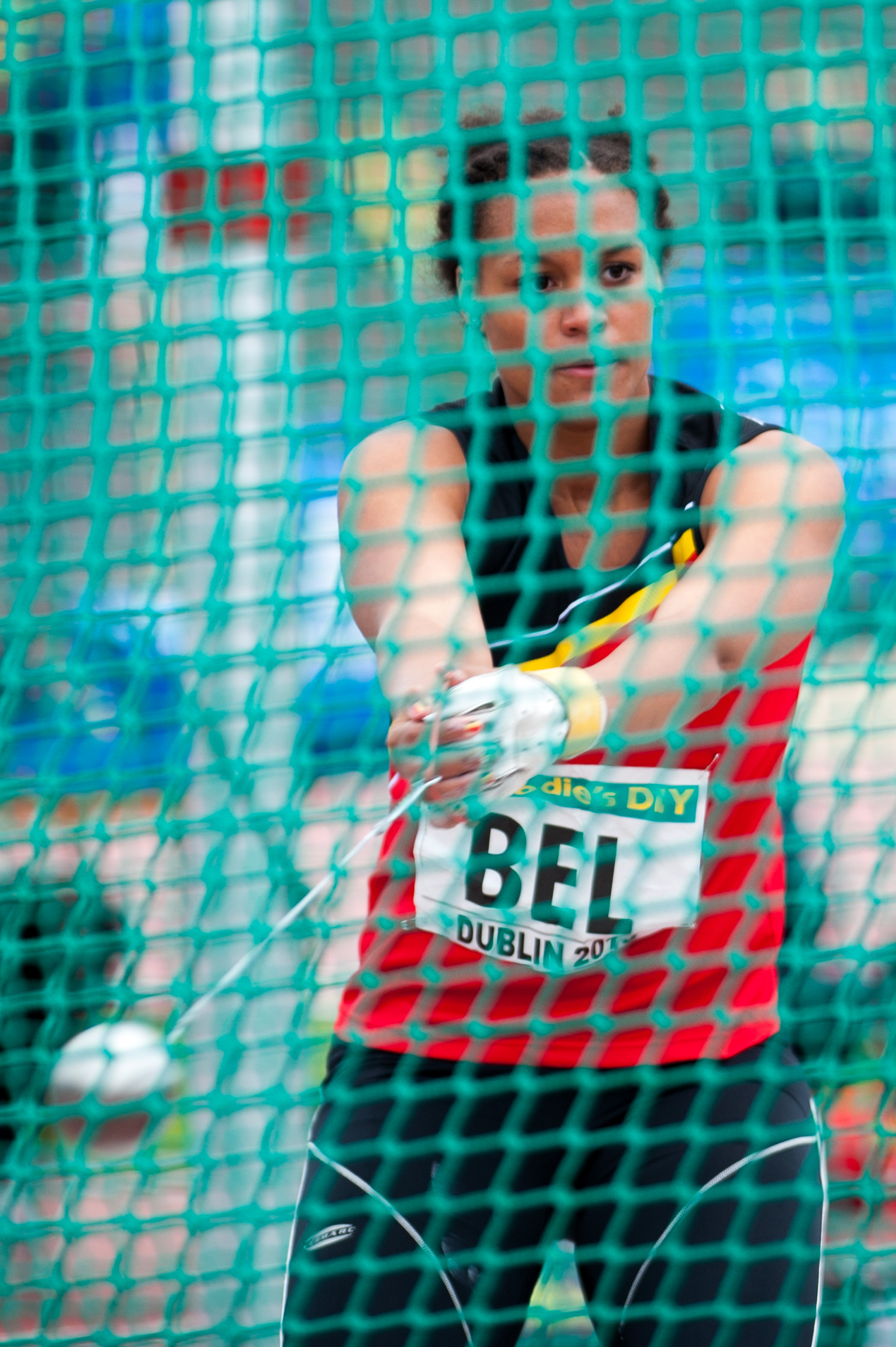
- Jolien Boumkwo at the 2013 European Team Championships

Personal information
- Born: 27 August 1993 (age 32) Ghent, Belgium
- Education: Ghent University

Sport
- Sport: Athletics
- Event(s): Shot put, hammer throw
- Club: Racing Gent
- Coached by: Philip Gilson; Tim De Coster; Veerle Blondeel

Jolien Maliga Boumkwo (born 27 August 1993) is a Belgian athlete competing in the shot put and hammer throw. She holds national records in both indoor and outdoor shot put.

In 2023 she attracted international attention after stepping in to replace injured teammate Anne Zagré (with fellow hurdler Hanne Claes also injured) in the 100m hurdles event at the 2023 European Athletics Team Championships. Taking the course at a relaxed pace to avoid risk of injury, she finished last with a time of 32.81s, picking up two points towards the national score due to a false start by another hurdler.

== International competitions ==
Year	Competition	Venue	Position	Event	Notes
Representing Belgium
2011	European Junior Championships	Tallinn, Estonia	13th (q)	Shot put	14.32 m
2012	World Junior Championships	Barcelona, Spain	10th	Shot put	15.31 m
2013	European U23 Championships	Tampere, Finland	14th (q)	Shot put	15.21 m
2015	European U23 Championships	Tallinn, Estonia	6th	Shot put	16.47 m
2015	European U23 Championships	Tallinn, Estonia	14th (q)	Hammer throw	63.24 m
2016	European Championships	Amsterdam, Netherlands	14th (q)	Shot put	16.66 m
2023	European Indoor Championships	Istanbul, Turkey	15th (q)	Shot put	16.18 m
2023	European Team Championships	Chorzów, Poland	8th	100m Hurdles	32.81 s
2023	European Team Championships	Chorzów, Poland	7th	Shot put	16.58 m

== Personal bests ==
Outdoor

- Shot put – 17.09 m (Brussels 2016) NR
- Discus throw – 50.60 m (Kessel-Lo 2014)
- Hammer throw – 67.30 m (Brussels 2016)
- 100m Hurdles - 32.81 s (Chorzów 2023)

Indoor

- Shot put – 17.87 m (Ghent 2023) NR
