= Imke Vervaet =

Belgian sprinter

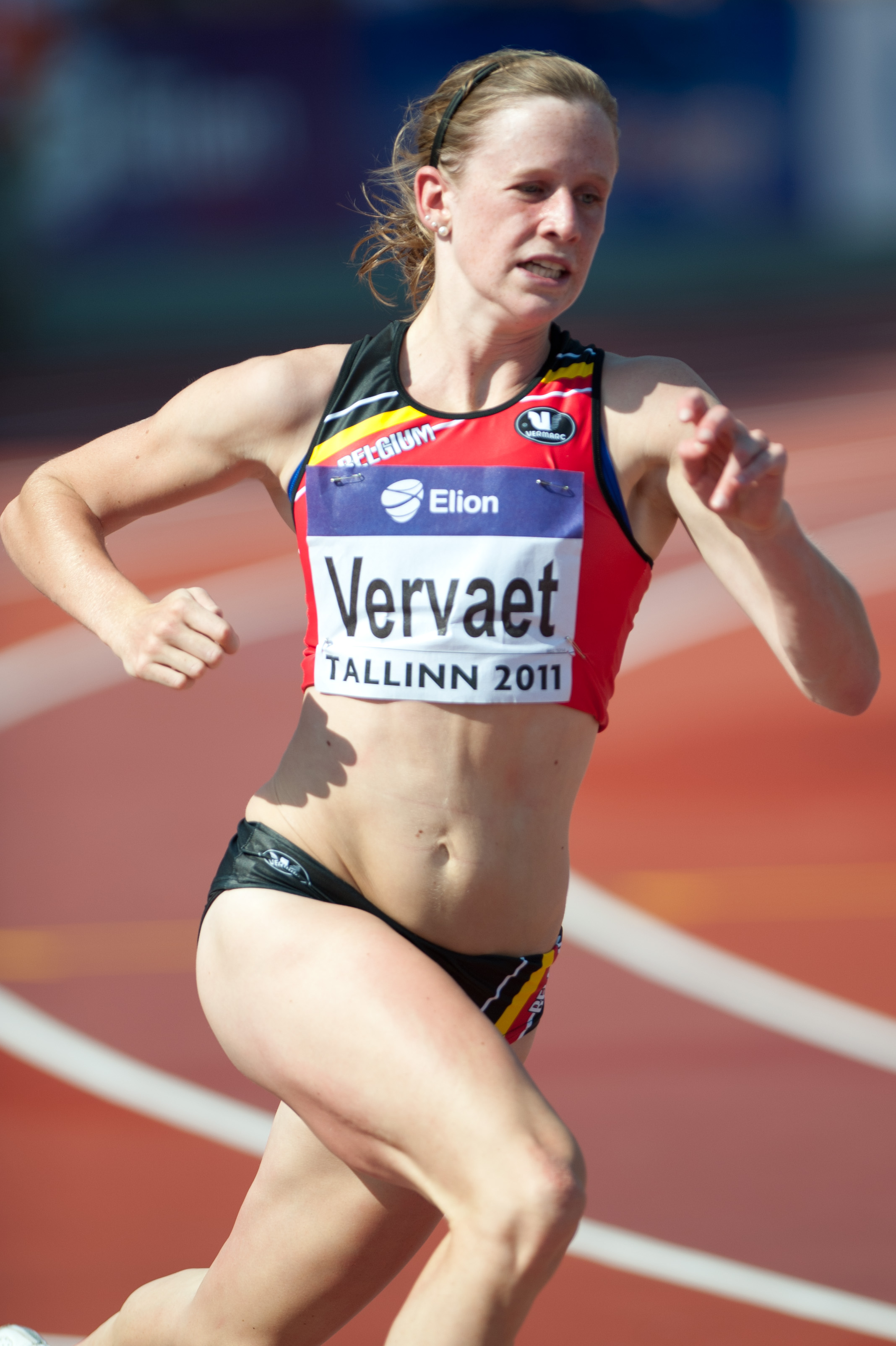
- Vervaet in 2018

Personal information
- Nationality: Belgian
- Born: 11 April 1993 (age 33) Ghent, Belgium

Sport
- Sport: Athletics
- Event: Sprinting
Medal record
Women's athletics
Representing Belgium
World Championships
Bronze medal – third place	2025 Tokyo	4 × 400 m mixed
European Championships
Bronze medal – third place	2024 Rome	4 × 400 m relay
Bronze medal – third place	2024 Rome	4 × 400 m mixed
European Indoor Championships
Silver medal – second place	2025 Apeldoorn	4 × 400 m mixed

Imke Vervaet (born 11 April 1993) is a retired Belgian athlete. She competed at the 2020 and 2024 Summer Olympics as a 200 metres runner and as a member of the Belgian women's 4 × 400 metres and mixed 4 × 400 metres relay teams. She also participated at multiple World and European Athletics championships, indoor and outdoor, individually and as a member of the 4 × 400 metres relay teams. She was national champion in the women's 200 metres in 2019, 2020, 2021 and 2024. In November 2025, she announced her retirement from the sport.

== Career ==
=== 2019 ===
She ran in the heats of the mixed 4 × 400 metres relay event at the 2019 World Athletics Championships in Doha, Qatar qualifying with the Belgium team for the final and the 2020 Summer Olympics in Tokyo, Japan. Later that week, she also ran in the heats and final of the women's 4 × 400 metres relay event, finishing 5th in the final and again qualifying with the team for the 2020 Summer Olympics. In between, she also ran a personal best of 23.24s in the heats of the women's 200 metres event but missed out on the semi-finals.

=== 2020 ===
In 2020, she won the silver medal in the women's long jump event at the 2020 Belgian Indoor Athletics Championships held in Ghent, Belgium.

=== 2021 ===
In May 2021, at the World Athletics Relays in Chorzów, Poland, she was on the team that qualified Belgium for the women's 4 × 400 metres relay at the 2022 World Athletics Championships in Oregon, USA.

Having qualified for the women's 200 metres at the 2020 Summer Olympic Games via the World Athletics Rankings, she finished 4th in her round 1 heat, setting a personal best of 23.05s, and proceeded to the semi-finals where she finished 7th and was eliminated. She also ran in the heats and final of the women's 4 × 400 metres relay with the Belgium team finishing 7th in the final as well as in the heats and final of the mixed 4 × 400 metres relay with the Belgium team finishing 5th in the final.

=== 2022 ===
In March 2022, she ran in the heats and final of the women's 4 × 400 metres relay at the 2022 World Athletics Indoor Championships in Belgrade, Serbia finishing 6th in the final. In July 2022 she ran in the heats and final of the women's 4 × 400 metres relay at the 2022 World Athletics Championships in Eugene, Oregon again finishing 6th in the final. She also participated in the women's 200 metres but was eliminated in the heats. Barely a month later, she ran in the heats of the women's 4 × 400 metres relay at the 2022 European Athletics Championships in Munich, Germany finishing 2nd and qualifying the Belgian team for the final but was replaced in the final.

=== 2023 ===
In August 2023, she ran in the heats and final of the mixed 4 × 400 metres relay at the 2023 World Athletics Championships in Budapest, Hungary finishing 5th in the final. And as in 2022, she ran in the heats and final of the women's 4 × 400 metres relay at the 2023 World Athletics Championships in Budapest, Hungary also finishing 5th in the final, one place better than in 2022.

=== 2024 ===
In March 2024, she ran in the heats of the women's 4 × 400 metres relay at the 2024 World Athletics Indoor Championships in Glasgow, Scotland, helping the team to qualify for the final. In May 2024, at the World Athletics Relays in The Bahamas, she was on the teams that qualified Belgium for the 4 × 400 metres mixed relay and the women's 4 × 400 metres relay at the 2024 Summer Olympic Games in Paris, France. And later that same year, she was on the Belgian 4 × 400 metres women's relay team that won a bronze medal at the European Athletics Championships. Having qualified for the women's 200 metres at the 2024 Summer Olympic Games via the World Athletics Rankings, she finished 7th in her round 1 heat and was eliminated in the repechages. She also ran in the heats and final of the women's 4 × 400 metres relay with the Belgium team finishing 7th in the final.

=== 2025 ===
In February 2025, she set an indoor Belgian national of 23.01s on the 200 metres, breaking her own record dating from February 2023. In March, she won a silver medal at the 2025 European Athletics Indoor Championships in Apeldoorn, The Netherlands as a member of Belgium's 4 × 400 m mixed relay team. In May 2025, at the World Athletics Relays in Guangzhou,China, she ran as a member of both the Belgium women's 4 × 400 metres relay and the mixed 4 × 400 metres relay teams qualifying both teams for the 2025 World Athletics Championships. In June 2025, she helped promote the Belgium team to the First Division of the European Athletics Team Championships by winning the Second Division of the 2025 European Athletics Team Championships in Maribor, Slovenia where she set personal bests in both the individual 200 and 400 metres and broke 23 seconds on the 200 metres for the first time in her career. At the 2025 World Athletics Championships in Tokyo, Japan, she won a bronze medal with the Belgian team in the mixed 4 × 400 metres relay and finished fourth in the final of the women's 4 × 400 metres relay. Having qualified on the basis of the world rankings, she also ran the women's 200 metres where she reached the semi-finals.

== International competitions ==
Year	Competition	Venue	Position	Event	Notes
Representing Belgium
2019	World Championships	Doha, Qatar	8th (h)	4 × 400 m relay mixed	3:16.16
2019	World Championships	Doha, Qatar	27th (h)	200 m	23.24
2019	World Championships	Doha, Qatar	5th	4 × 400 m relay	3:27.15
2021	World Relays	Chorzów, Poland	2nd (h)	4 × 400 m relay	3:28.27
2021	Olympic Games	Tokyo, Japan	7th (sf)	200 m	23.31
2021	Olympic Games	Tokyo, Japan	7th	4 × 400 m relay	3:23.96 NR
2021	Olympic Games	Tokyo, Japan	5th	4 × 400 m relay mixed	3:11.51 NR
2022	World Indoor Championships	Belgrade, Serbia	6th	4 × 400 m relay	3:33.61
2022	European Championships	Munich, Germany	6th (sf)	200 m	23.48
2022	European Championships	Munich, Germany	2nd (h)	4 × 400 m relay	3:25.44
2022	World Championships	Eugene, Oregon, USA	5th (h)	200 m	23.28
2022	World Championships	Eugene, Oregon, USA	6th	4 × 400 m relay	3:26.29
2023	World Championships	Budapest, Hungary	5th	4 × 400 m relay mixed	3:13.83
2023	World Championships	Budapest, Hungary	5th	4 × 400 m relay	3:22.84
2024	World Indoor Championships	Glasgow, Scotland	3rd (h)	4 × 400 m relay	3:28.07
2024	World Relays	Nassau, The Bahamas	DQ (f)	4 × 400 m relay mixed	DQ
2024	World Relays	Nassau, The Bahamas	1st (r)	4 × 400 m relay	3:26.79
2024	European Championships	Rome, Italy	3rd	4 × 400 m relay	3:22.95
2024	Olympic Games	Paris, France	7th (h)	200 m	23.20
2024	Olympic Games	Paris, France	7th	4 × 400 m relay	3:22.40
2025	European Indoor Championships	Apeldoorn, Netherlands	2nd	4 × 400 m relay mixed	3:16.19
2025	European Indoor Championships	Apeldoorn, Netherlands	11th (sf)	400 m	52.84
2025	World Relays	Guangzhou, China	1st (r1)	4 × 400 m relay mixed	3:11.83
2025	World Relays	Guangzhou, China	2nd (r2)	4 × 400 m relay	3:24.52
2025	World Championships	Tokyo, Japan	6th (sf)	200 m	22.79
2025	World Championships	Tokyo, Japan	4th	4 × 400 m relay	3:22.15
2025	World Championships	Tokyo, Japan	3rd	4 × 400 m mixed	3:10.61

== Personal bests ==
Outdoor

- 200 metres – 22.85 (Maribor 2025)
- 400 metres – 50.86 (Maribor 2025)

Indoor

- 200 metres – 23.01 (Gent 2025)
- 400 metres – 51.94 (Apeldoorn 2025)
