= National records in the 10,000 metres =

The following table is an overview of national records in the 10,000 metres.

== Outdoor ==
=== Men ===
Country	Time	Athlete	Date	Place	Ref.
Uganda	26:11.00	Joshua Cheptegei	7 October 2020	Valencia	R1
Ethiopia	26:17.53	Kenenisa Bekele	26 August 2005	Brussels	R1
Kenya	26:27.85	Paul Tergat	22 August 1997	Brussels	R1
United States	26:33.84	Grant Fisher	6 March 2022	San Juan Capistrano	R1
Canada	26:34.14	Mohammed Ahmed	6 March 2022	San Juan Capistrano	R1
Eritrea	26:37.25	Zersenay Tadese	25 August 2006	Brussels	R1
Morocco	26:38.08	Salah Hissou	23 August 1996	Brussels	R1
Qatar	26:38.76	Ahmad Hassan Abdullah	5 September 2003	Brussels	R1
Great Britain	26:46.57	Mo Farah	3 June 2011	Eugene	R1
Spain	26:49.49	Thierry Ndikumwenayo	2 August 2024	Paris-Saint-Denis	R1
South Africa	26:50.64	Adriaan Wildschutt	2 August 2024	Paris-Saint-Denis	R1
Belgium	26:52.30	Mohammed Mourhit	3 September 1999	Brussels	R1
Sweden	26:52.87	Andreas Almgren	16 March 2024	San Juan Capistrano	R1
France	26:58.67	Jimmy Gressier	2 August 2024	Paris-Saint-Denis	R1
India	27:00.22	Gulveer Singh	29 March 2025	San Juan Capistrano	R1
Japan	27:05.92	Mebuki Suzuki	22 November 2025	Hachioji	
Tanzania	27:06.17	John Yuda Msuri	30 August 2002	Brussels	R1
Bahrain	27:07.49	Birhanu Balew	19 May 2021	Ostrava	R1
Mexico	27:08.23	Arturo Barrios	18 August 1989	Berlin	R1
Australia	27:09.57	Jack Rayner	16 March 2024	San Juan Capistrano	R1
Italy	27:10.76	Yemaneberhan Crippa	6 October 2019	Doha	R1
Portugal	27:12.47	António Pinto	30 July 1999	Stockholm	R1
Thailand	27:17.14	Kieran Tuntivate	20 February 2021	San Juan Capistrano	R1
Switzerland	27:17.29	Julien Wanders	17 July 2019	Hengelo	R1
Burundi	27:20.38	Aloÿs Nizigama	7 July 1995	London	R1
Netherlands	27:20.52	Mike Foppen	28 March 2026	San Juan Capistrano	
Germany	27:21.53	Dieter Baumann	5 April 1997	Baracaldo	R1
Rwanda	27:22.28	Dieudonné Disi	14 September 2007	Brussels	R1
Djibouti	27:22.38	Mohamed Ismail	18 May 2024	London	R1
Turkey	27:24.09	Ali Kaya	2 May 2015	Mersin	R1
Norway	27:24.78	Sondre Nordstad Moen	14 July 1990	Kristiansand	R1
Guatemala	27:26.02	Luis Grijalva	16 March 2024	San Juan Capistrano	R1
Ireland	27:26.95	Efrem Gidey	29 March 2025	San Juan Capistrano	
Brazil	27:28.12	Marílson dos Santos	2 June 2007	Neerpelt	R1
New Zealand	27:30.90	Jake Robertson	13 April 2018	Gold Coast	R1
Finland	27:30.99	Martti Vainio	29 August 1978	Prague	R1
Lithuania	27:31.50	Aleksandras Antipovas	29 August 1978	Prague	R2
Saudi Arabia	27:31.61	Mukhlid Al-Otaibi	9 June 2012	Radès	R1
Ecuador	27:32.59	Bayron Piedra	1 May 2011	Palo Alto	R1
Israel	27:33.99	Tadesse Getahon	20 May 2023	London	R1
Sudan	27:35.92; 28:09.80	Jamal Abdelmaji Eisa Mohammed (Note: Sudanese-born Eisa Mohammed was a member of the Athlete Refugee Team in 2022 and 2024; World Athletics accepted at least his 2022 time as a Sudanese record.)	2 August 2024; 26 April 2022	Paris-Saint-Denis; Tel Aviv	R1; R2
Austria	27:36.46	Günther Weidlinger	4 May 2008	Palo Alto	R1
Scotland	27:36.77	Andrew Butchart	6 March 2022	San Juan Capistrano	
Argentina	27:38.72	Antonio Silio	26 September 1993	Brussels	R1
Romania	27:40.06	Ilie Floroiu	29 August 1978	Prague	R1
Estonia	27:40.61	Enn Sellik	29 August 1978	Prague	R2
Belarus	27:41.89	Aleksandr Fedotkin	4 September 1979	Brussels	R2
Slovakia	27:42.98	Róbert Štefko	29 June 1997	Lille	R1
China	27:47.53	Wang Wenjie	30 May 2026	Yokohama	
Czech Republic	27:47.90	Jan Pešava	8 June 1998	Prague	R1
Botswana	27:48.2 h	Matthews Motshwarateu	7 May 1979	Stellenbosch	R1
Colombia	27:53.02	Domingo Tibaduiza	11 June 1978	Vienna	R1
Russia	27:53.12	Sergey Ivanov	17 July 2008	Kazan	R1
Peru	27:53.58	Luis Ostos	5 May 2016	Stanford	R1
Poland	27:53.61	Jerzy Kowol	29 August 1978	Prague	R1
Tunisia	27:54.69	Mohammed Gammoudi	8 August 1972	Munich	R1
Denmark	27:54.76	Carsten Jørgensen	4 April 1998	Lisbon	R1
Bulgaria	27:56.26	Evgeni Ignatov	2 July 1988	Oslo	R1
Zimbabwe	27:57.34	Cuthbert Nyasango	28 July 2007	Avilés	R1
Algeria	27:58.03	Khoudir Aggoune	6 June 2008	Saint-Maur	R1
Serbia	27:58.38	Danijel Korica	10 August 1971	Helsinki	R2
Kazakhstan	27:58.9 h	Anatoly Badrankov	3 November 1978	Tashkent	R2
Chile	27:58.97	Carlos Díaz	20 May 2023	London	R1
Ukraine	27:59.8 h	Pavlo Andreiev	10 July 1973	Moscow	R2
Ghana	28:00.09	William Amponsah	11 April 2024	Azusa	R1
Zambia	28:00.33	Charles Mulinga	14 April 1995	Walnut	R1
Kyrgyzstan	28:00.9 h	Vadim Mochalov	10 July 1973	Sochi	R2
Lesotho	28:01.00	Kamohelo Mofolo	28 July 2026	Glasgow	
Hungary	28:01.88	Zoltán Káldy	6 July 1991	Oslo	R1
Palestine	28:04.76	Mohammed Baket	24 August 1996	Troisdorf	R1
Jamaica	28:06.40	Kemoy Campbell	31 March 2017	Stanford	R1
Somalia	28:06.65	Abdi Abdirahman (Note: Abdirahman ran a personal best of 27:16.99 on 8 June 2008, after he became a U.S. citizen in 2000.)	8 May 1999	Palo Alto	R2
Greece	28:07.17	Spyros Andriopoulos	30 August 1987	Rome	R1
Uruguay	28:14.96	Valentín Soca	29 March 2024	Palo Alto	R1
Georgia	28:16.15	Oleg Strizhakov	25 July 1990	Seattle	R2
Moldova	28:16.4 h	Vasiliy Nikolayev	18 July 1978	Vilnius	R2
Latvia	28:19.49	Artūrs Niklāvs Medveds	11 May 2024	Los Angeles	R1
Puerto Rico	28:23.26	Héctor Pagán	16 April 2026	Azusa	
South Korea	28:23.62	Jeon Eun-hoi	23 October 2010	Yokohama	R1
Croatia	28:24.32	Slavko Petrović	2 April 2005	Barakaldo	R1
North Korea	28:26.86	Ryu Ok-Hyon	9 June 1990	Moscow	R1
Cyprus	28:26.87	Marios Kassianidis	19 June 1981	Prague	R1
Cape Verde	28:28.93	Samuel Freire	20 April 2024	Caldas da Rainha	R1
Malta	28:29.85	Jordan Gusman	31 March 2023	Palo Alto	R1
Libya	28:30.58	Mohamed Hrezi	6 March 2022	San Juan Capistrano	R1
Angola	28:31.09; 28:20.0 h#	João N'Tyamba	24 August 1999; 5 May 2001	Seville; Lubango	R2
Venezuela	28:31.14	Marvin Blanco	6 December 2015	Sacramento	R1
South Sudan	28:32.72	Dominic Lokinyomo Lobalu	4 June 2021	Uster	R2
Slovenia	28:32.86	Stane Rozman	30 June 1983	Lausanne	R2
Bolivia	28:34.37	Vidal Basco	9 August 2019	Lima	R1
Iceland	28:36.80	Hlynur Andrésson	5 June 2021	Birmingham	R1
Namibia	28:38.2 h	Mynhardt Kawanivi	9 April 2016	Swakopmund	R2
Madagascar	28:42.0 (Note: This record is rumored to be one lap short (9600m).(R2)); 29:13.3	Jules Randrianarivelo; Haja Ramananjatovo	21 July 1979; 15 June 1998	Moscow; Saint-Paul	R1 R2; R2
Iran	28:45.44 (Note: Accepted by World Athletics, but not by the Iranian athletic federation; Abootorabi transferred from Iran to Sweden on 13 June 2022, a month after this record.); 29:22.65	Mohammadreza Abootorabi; Hamid Sajjadi	14 May 2022; 26 July 1996	London; Atlanta	R2
Luxembourg	28:46.4 h	Justin Gloden	15 June 1984	Leuven	R1
Andorra	28:47.06	Nahuel Carabaña	23 May 2026	La Spezia	
Costa Rica	28:48.4 h	Rafael Ángel Pérez	8 May 1976	Knoxville	R1
Uzbekistan	28:48.4 h	Abdirahman Ibragimov	9 August 1980	Kharkiv	R2
Cuba	28:48.96 (Note: World Athletics lists Cuba's time of 28:48.96 as the Cuban national record, but by mistake also has a personal best for the Cuban runner Luis Medina of 28:18.16, run on 25 July 1975 at the Pre-Olympic track and field meet in Montreal.(R1) Medina was not there and this was instead the time run by Luis Hernández from Mexico.)	Alberto Cuba	10 February 1989	Havana	R2
Turkmenistan	28:50.0 h	Rashid Kakadshanov	18 July 1978	Vilnius	R2
Azerbaijan	28:55.82	Evans Kiplagat	20 May 2017	Baku	R2
Paraguay	28:56.39	Derlys Ayala	19 April 2018	Torrance	R1
Congo DR	28:57.28	Danny Kassap	9 July 2003	Hamilton	R1
Philippines	29:02.36	Eduardo Buenavista	7 October 2002	Busan	R1
Nigeria	29:04.5 h	Itsifamus Choolon	7 June 1998	Lagos	R1
North Macedonia	29:07.94	Dario Ivanovski	4 April 2026	Skopje	
Malawi	29:11.13	Rodwell Kamwendo	26 July 2002	Manchester	R2
Chinese Taipei	29:12.1 h	Hsu Gi-sheng	28 November 1993	Hachioji	R2
Aruba	29:12.53	Kimball Reynierse	14 May 1986	Leiden	R2
New Caledonia	29:13.0 h	Alain Lazare	7 July 1979	Nouméa	R2
Mongolia	29:17.72	Ser-Od Bat-Ochir	9 October 2020	Tajimi	R2
Sri Lanka	29:18.0 h	Lucien Sellapuliage B. Rosa	13 May 1975	Arkansas City	R2
Haiti	29:18.03	Steeve Gabart	27 March 2009	Palo Alto	R2
U.S. Virgin Islands	29:18.25	Eduardo Garcia	28 May 2021	Portland	R2
Eswatini	29:19.71	Siphesihle Mdluli	26 July 2002	Manchester	R2
Egypt	29:20.91	Muharram Hamedallah Mohamad	16 March 2017	Cairo	R2
Jordan	29:24.35	Awad Al-Hasini	10 October 1994	Hiroshima	R2
Gambia	29:24.43	Nfamara Njie	10 April 2022	Correggio	R2
Indonesia	29:25.77	Agus Prayogo	26 November 2010	Guangzhou	R2
Tajikistan	29:29.0 h	Anatoliy Belogurov	8 May 1977	Dushanbe	R2
Bosnia and Herzegovina	29:29.8 h	Sead Kondo	7 June 1975	Sarajevo	R2
Malaysia	29:30.19	Ramachandran Murusamy	27 August 1994	Victoria	R2
Nepal	29:35.06	Deepak Adhikari	30 September 2023	Hangzhou	
Myanmar	29:37.4 h	Gopal Thein Win	24 February 1993	Rangoon	R2
Albania	29:41.5 h	Isuf Curri	21 October 1989	Tirana	R2
Vietnam	29:44.82	Nguyễn Văn Lai	19 December 2013	Naypyidaw	R2
Saint Lucia	29:48.97	Zepherinus Joseph	23 March 2001	Tallahassee	R2
Mauritius	29:50.6 h (Note: Accepted by World Athletics, but not ratified by the Mauritius Athletics Association); 30:26.42	Menon Ramsamy	10 August 1998; 4 September 2003	Saint-Paul; Réduit	R2
Armenia	29:52.8 h	Artashes Mikoyan	20 July 1976	Chişinău	R2
Saint Vincent and the Grenadines	29:58.3 h	Pamenos Ballantyne	19 July 1998	Derby	R2
Hong Kong	30:00.65	Tse Chun Yin	1 December 2024	Yokohama	
United Arab Emirates	30:04.1 h	Mohamed Ahmed Amer	8 August 1997	Västerås	R2
Iraq	30:06.0 h	Abdulkarim Al-Sadi	9 November 1986	Mosul	R2
Panama	30:07.0 h	Agustín Morán	22 March 1997	Panama City	R2
Cameroon	30:07.3 h	Pierre Foka	26 August 1995	Yaoundé	R2
Lebanon	30:08.20	Ali Alrida Kanaan	10 July 2025	Beirut	
Bermuda	30:08.21; 30:04.66 (Note: Not listed by World Athletics as a Bermudan result nor ratified by the BNAA.)	Lamont Marshall; Christopher Estwanik	19 April 2018; 3 July 2015	Walnut; Saint Clement	R2
Ivory Coast	30:09.16	Jonathan Atse Herrera	4 May 2024	Pacé	
Mozambique	30:09.3 h	Pedro Mulomo	16 May 1982	Maputo	R2
Togo	30:13.81	Kama Pakoula Lekadé	15 September 1995	Rome	R2
Syria	30:14.5 h	Farouk Khadour	10 October 1986	Yalta	R2
Senegal	30:15.17	Ibrahima Gning	22 June 2007	Dakar	R2
Chad	30:16.43	Ahmat Abdou-Daoud	23 July 2017	Abidjan	R2
Dominican Republic	30:17.03	Amauri Rodriguez	25 February 2022	Santo Domingo	R2
Niger	30:18.5 h	Inni Aboubacar	11 July 1980	Grasse	R2
Fiji	30:19.92	Yeshnil Karan	22 April 2025	Gold Coast	
Nicaragua	30:25.25	William Aguirre	10 March 1989	Havana	R2
Pakistan	30:27.2 h	Mazhar Hussain	2 August 1977	Troisdorf	R2
Bangladesh	30:27.7 h	Mohamed Eliysuddin	18–20 March 1999	Dhaka	R2
El Salvador	30:27.96	Ronald Arias	25 May 2001	Havana	R2
Trinidad and Tobago	30:30.42	Quintin John	27 May 1994	Kingston, Jamaica	R2
Gabon	30:30.5 h	Jérôme Abi	20 July 1978	Algiers	R2
Bahamas	30:32.11	Gabriel Curtis	17 April 2021	Charlottesville	R2
Singapore	30:33.29	Soh Rui Yong	29 November 2025	Tokyo	
Kuwait	30:39.25; 30:29.73 #	Abdulrahman Abdulrahman; Ali Saleh	16 May 2022; 9 November 1983	Kuwait City; Kuwait City	R2.
Cayman Islands	30:39.42	Dominic Dyer	5 April 2019	Williamsburg	R2
Central African Republic	30:41.5 h	Jules Yadagba	12 July 2003	Bangui	R2
Barbados	30:44.30	Leo Garnes	22 April 1993	Albany	R2
Honduras	30:44.8 h	Clovis Morales	3 August 1977	Ludenscheid	R2
Montenegro	30:45.0 h	Osman Erović	31 May 1987	Kumbor	R2
San Marino	30:45.4 h	Gian Luigi Macina	12 April 1992	Rubiera	R2
Kosovo	30:47.0 h #	Nexhmidin Ibishi	29 May 1971	Belgrade	R2
Mali	30:47.98	Youssouf Diallo	20 July 1994	Lisbon	R2
Congo Republic	30:48.27	Obva Elengha	22 September 1991	Cairo	R2
Yemen	30:49.58	Khalid Al-Etashi	31 July 1992	Barcelona	R2
Timor-Leste	30:52.52	Felisberto de Deus	7 December 2019	New Clark City	R2
Gibraltar	30:59.87	Michael Sánchez	10 July 2005	Lerwick	R2
Oman	31:02.00	Ahmad Saeed Al-Rawahi	7 November 1997	Bangkok	R2
Seychelles	31:05.55	Simon Labiche	21 June 1997	Durban	R2
Sierra Leone	31:06.29	Alifu Massaquoi	18 July 1970	Edinburgh	R2
Guyana	31:14.14	Kelvin Johnson	21 June 2013	Port of Spain	
Burkina Faso	31:16.19	Aboubacar S. Nebié	15 July 2023	Bobo-Dioulasso	
Papua New Guinea	31:21.4 h	Tau John Tokwepota	1976	Lae	R2
Benin	31:24.6 h	Imorou Zato	18 July 1997	Cotonou	R2
French Polynesia	31:27.50	Charles Delys	22 April 2023	Pacé	
Liechtenstein	31:29.18	Roland Wille	7 July 1994	Dübendorf	R2
Grenada	31:31.1 h	Emerald Frederick	8 March 1991	St. George's	R2
Guam	31:39.24	Johnson Lee	18 April 2008	Monmouth	R2
Equatorial Guinea	31:52.2 h	José Luis Ebatela	7 July 2002	Mongomo	R2
Laos	31:52.66	Sinlasone Sanith	21 August 1996	Sydney	R2
Dominica	31:53.3 h	Steve Agar	16 April 1989	St. George's	R2
Monaco	32:00.76	Antoine Berlin	22 April 2010	Philadelphia	R2
Comoros	32:15.56	Daou Bacar Mouhamadi	11 March 2017	Saint-Denis	R2
Guinea	32:20.96	Mamadi Kaba	18 April 2021	Rubiera	R2
Macau	32:40.0 h	Fong Kim Fong	1 March 1989	Guangzhou	R2
Solomon Islands	32:44.0 h	Chris Votu	26 April 2003	Lae	R2
Maldives	32:46.14	Hussain Fazeel Haroon	21 April 2019	Doha	R2
Bhutan	32:47.22 A	Sangay Wangchuk	4 December 2019	Kathmandu	R2
Cambodia	32:52.13	Pheara Vann	30 September 2023	Hangzhou	
Liberia	33:04.0 h	Nimley Twegbe	1 September 1984	Monrovia	R2
Guinea-Bissau	33:04.04	Aruna Dabo	18 July 1989	Casablanca	R2
Vanuatu	33:04.1 h	Jimmy Sandy Sam	7 July 2003	Suva	R2
Mauritania	33:04.49	Ismaël Ould Adermaz	5 August 1995	Gothenburg	R2
Suriname	33:24.9 h	Marcus Aminta	1 July 1983	Paramaribo	R2
Afghanistan	33:25.6 h	Nouruddin	1961	Kabul	R2
São Tomé and Príncipe	33:30.0 h	Mário Pitra	5 June 1982	São Tomé	R2
Antigua and Barbuda	33:32.6 h	Tyrone Thibou	1986	Bridgetown	R2
Brunei	33:56.35	Sifli Anak Ahar	8 December 2003	Hanoi	R2
Niue	34:17.1 h	Palana Ahotala	16 October 1982	Paliati	
American Samoa	34:28.0 h	Sailala Solilai	9 September 1971	Pirae	R2
Belize	34:32.59	Christopher Pinelo	13 March 2015	Los Angeles	R2
Samoa	34:42.5; 33:34.1 (Note: Although officially ratified, Samuelu's time was achieved in a 10k road race.)	James Hoeflich; Samulu Samuelu	30 August 1979; 1987	Apia; Suva	R2; R2
Saint Kitts and Nevis	35:18.4 h	Jesse Mulcaire	13 May 1990	Basseterre	R2
Cook Islands	35:23.0 h	Muriaroa Ngaro	30 August 1979	Suva	R2
Micronesia	35:46.1 h	Elias Rodriguez	27 March 1994	Mangilao	R2
Wallis and Futuna	35:57.6 h	Sosefo Aikilikopi	30 August 1979	Suva	
Northern Mariana Islands	36:30.64	Victor Nash Santos	4 July 2025	Koror	
Kiribati	36:46.2 h	Tara Mango	31 August 1963	Suva	R2
Tonga	37:33.6 h	Peau'afi Houkinima	30 August 1979	Suva	R2
Palau	38:24.2 h	Richard Madrekewet	8 July 1990	San Antonio	R2
Norfolk Island	38:42.1 h	Trevor Calder	7 November 1992	Middlegate	R2
Marshall Islands	40:11.92	Bob Sholar	3 August 1998	Koror	R2

=== Women ===
Country	Time	Athlete	Date	Place	Ref.
Kenya	28:54.14	Beatrice Chebet	25 May 2024	Eugene	R3
Ethiopia	29:01.03	Letesenbet Gidey	8 June 2021	Hengelo	R3
Netherlands	29:06.82	Sifan Hassan	6 June 2021	Hengelo	R3
China	29:31.78	Wang Junxia	8 September 1993	Beijing	R3
Bahrain	29:50.77	Kalkidan Gezahegne	8 May 2021	Maia	R3
Great Britain	30:00.86	Eilish McColgan	4 March 2023	San Juan Capistrano	R3
United States	30:03.82	Alicia Monson	4 March 2023	San Juan Capistrano	R3
Eritrea	30:12.15	Rahel Daniel	16 July 2022	Eugene	R3
Norway	30:13.74	Ingrid Kristiansen	5 July 1986	Oslo	R3
Kazakhstan	30:17.64	Caroline Chepkoech Kipkirui	16 July 2022	Eugene	R3
Japan	30:20.44	Hitomi Niiya	4 December 2020	Osaka	R3
Turkey	30:21.67	Elvan Abeylegesse	15 April 2006	Antalya	R3
Portugal	30:22.88	Fernanda Ribeiro	30 September 2000	Sydney	R3
Russia	30:23.07	Alla Zhilyayeva	23 August 2003	Saint-Denis	R3
Uganda	30:24.04	Sarah Chelangat	25 May 2024	Eugene	R3
Australia	30:34.11	Rose Davies	11 June 2025	Oslo	
New Zealand	30:35.54	Kimberley Smith	4 May 2008	Palo Alto	R3
Italy	30:38.23	Nadia Battocletti	13 September 2025	Tokyo	
Latvia	30:38.78	Jeļena Prokopčuka	7 August 2006	Gothenburg	R3
Burundi	30:41.93	Francine Niyonsaba	7 August 2021	Tokyo	R3
Israel	30:46.37	Lonah Chemtai Salpeter	15 August 2022	Munich	R3
Ireland	30:47.59	Sonia O'Sullivan	6 August 2002	Munich	R3
Belgium	30:51.18	Jana Van Lent	6 June 2026	Louvain-la-Neuve	
Spain	30:51.69	Marta Domínguez	7 August 2006	Gothenburg	R3
South Africa	30:52.51	Elana Meyer	10 September 1994	London	R3
Germany	31:01.71	Konstanze Klosterhalfen	27 February 2021	Austin	R3
Mexico	31:04.08	Laura Galván	4 March 2023	San Juan Capistrano	R3
Slovenia	31:06.63	Helena Javornik	27 August 2004	Athens	R3
Sweden	31:08.05	Meraf Bahta	4 May 2021	Stockholm	R3
Ukraine	31:08.89	Nataliya Berkut	25 June 2004	Tula	R3
United Arab Emirates	31:10.25	Alia Saeed Mohammed	23 April 2016	Dubai	R3
Romania	31:11.24 (Note: World Athletics has a typo in the entry for Iulia Olteanu, giving her a what would be national record time of 31:00.25 instead of the actual 32:00.25 for her 10,000m race on 15 June 1996 in La Celle-Saint-Cloud. (R3))	Mihaela Botezan	27 August 2004	Athens	R4
Finland	31:12.78	Camilla Richardsson	20 May 2023	London	R3
Canada	31:13.94	Andrea Seccafien	14 May 2021	Irvine	R3
Morocco	31:16.94	Asmae Leghzaoui	12 September 2001	Tunis	R3
France	31:23.45	Mekdes Woldu	14 June 2025	Leiden	
Serbia	31:29.65	Olivera Jevtić	30 September 2000	Sydney	R4
Tanzania	31:32.02	Restituta Joseph Kemi	13 June 1999	Villeneuve-d'Ascq	R3
Argentina	31:33.07	Florencia Borelli	16 March 2024	San Juan Capistrano	R3
Switzerland	31:35.96	Daria Nauer	13 August 1994	Helsinki	R3
Greece	31:36.16	Alexi Pappas	12 August 2016	Rio de Janeiro	R3
Kyrgyzstan	31:36.90	Darya Maslova	12 August 2016	Rio de Janeiro	R3
Hungary	31:40.31	Anikó Kálovics	5 July 2003	Watford	R3
Belarus	31:42.02	Yekaterina Khramenkova	2 August 1988	Kyiv	R4
Moldova	31:42.43	Svetlana Guskova	30 August 1986	Stuttgart	R4
Poland	31:43.51	Karolina Nadolska	27 June 2013	Ostrava	R3
Rwanda	31:43.73	Florence Niyonkuru	15 May 2026	Accra	
Denmark	31:45.4 h Mx; 32:02.89	Loa Olafsson; Dorthe Rasmussen	6 April 1978; 4 September 1983	Copenhagen; Knarvik	R3 R4
Brazil	31:47.76	Carmen de Oliveira	21 August 1993	Stuttgart	R3
India	31:50.47	Preeja Sreedharan	21 November 2010	Guangzhou	R3
Peru	31:56.62	Inés Melchor	2 May 2015	Palo Alto	R3
Uzbekistan	31:57.42	Sitora Khamidova	5 August 2017	London	R3
North Korea	32:02.0 h	Hong Myong-Hui	20 June 1997	Pyongyang	R3
Czech Republic	32:08.96	Moira Stewartová	28 May 2022	Pacé	R3
Austria	32:12.33	Susanne Pumper	7 May 2005	Salzburg	R3
Algeria	32:13.15	Souad Ait Salem	23 July 2004	Mataró	R3
Albania	32:16.25	Luiza Gega	5 June 2021	Birmingham	R3
Luxembourg	32:16.97	Danièle Kaber	30 August 1986	Stuttgart	R3
Djibouti	32:17.72	Samiyah Hassan Nour	17 November 2025	Riyadh	
Azerbaijan	32:18.05	Layes Abdullayeva	15 July 2011	Ostrava	R3
Colombia	32:19.59	Carolina Tabares	2 May 2019	Palo Alto	R3
Croatia	32:28.67	Bojana Bjeljac	20 May 2023	London	R3
Venezuela	32:29.73	Edymar Brea	25 March 2023	Burjassot	R3
Bulgaria	32:30.07	Militsa Mircheva	29 March 2019	Palo Alto	R3
Lithuania	32:30.48	Živilė Balčiūnaitė	14 June 2005	Tula	R3
South Korea	32:33.61	Ahn Seul-ki	11 July 2018	Fukagawa	R3
Guatemala	32:35.19	Viviana Aroche	28 March 2026	San Juan Capistrano	
Puerto Rico	32:36.03	Beverly Ramos	5 May 2017	Palo Alto	R3
Hong Kong	32:39.88	Maggie Chan Man Yee	19 April 2002	Walnut	R3
Ecuador	32:42.25	Martha Tenorio	30 May 1992	Vancouver	R3
Slovakia	32:47.24	Ľudmila Melicherová	30 August 1986	Stuttgart	R4
Iceland	32:47.40	Martha Ernstdóttir	11 June 1994	Dublin	R3
Estonia	32:47.86	Sirje Eichelmann	2 August 1988	Kyiv	R4
Indonesia	32:49.47	Triyaningsih Triyaningsih	17 December 2009	Vientiane	R3
Cyprus	32:59.30	Andri Avraam	26 September 1988	Seoul	R3
Trinidad and Tobago	33:11.71	Tonya Nero	25 March 2011	Palo Alto	R3
Tunisia	33:12.98	Soulef Bouguerra	9 August 2003	Bucharest	R3
Cuba	33:13.0 h	Anisleidis Ochoa	8 March 2025		
Vietnam	33:13.23	Nguyễn Thị Oanh	17 December 2022	Hanoi	R3
Nigeria	33:16.11	Rose Akuso	25 June 2019	Abuja	R3
Georgia	33:16.91	Valeriya Zhandarova	6 August 2023	Chelyabinsk	R3
Paraguay	33:18.22	Carmen Martínez	5 August 2017	London	R3
Sudan	33:20.09	Amina Bakhit	23 April 2016	Dubai	R3
Zimbabwe	33:20.16	Julia Sakara	19 August 1993	Stuttgart	R3
Chile	33:23.12	Érika Olivera	30 November 1996	Concepción	R3
Mongolia	33:24.79	Bayartsogtyn Mönkhzayaa	13 July 2023	Bangkok	R3
Lesotho	33:27.35	Neheng Khatala	3 August 2022	Birmingham	R3
Chinese Taipei	33:39.90	Hsieh Chien-Ho (Note: 謝千鶴, also romanized as Xie Qianhe)	9 March 2021	New Taipei City	R4
Namibia	33:42.19	Elizabeth Mongudhi	25 July 1999	Windhoek	R4
Malaysia	33:50.80	Jayanthi Palaniappan	16 July 1994	Brussels	R4
Myanmar	33:52.20	Win Win Mar	20 July 1997	Rangoon	R4
Madagascar	33:52.25	Clarisse Rasoarizay	11 August 1998	Saint-Paul	R4
Sri Lanka	33:55.06	Hiruni Wijayaratne	9 June 2018	Portland	R4
Dominican Republic	33:58.79	Andreina de la Rosa	17 June 2017	Santo Domingo	R4
Jordan	34:00.81	Tamara Armoush	19 May 2018	London	R4
Bosnia and Herzegovina	34:03.23	Lucia Kimani	12 April 2008	Istanbul	R4
Bolivia	34:09.54	Jhoselyn Camargo	29 May 2021	Guayaquil	R4
Iran	34:10.61	Parisa Arab	9 May 2025	Rasht	
El Salvador	34:13.91	Rosa del Toro	28 April 2013	Palo Alto	R4
Cayman Islands	34:21.19	Michele Bush-Cuke	27 April 1989	Philadelphia	R4
Malta	34:25.1 h Mx; 34:55.78	Carol Galea	30 April 1997; 1 June 2001	Watford; San Marino	R4
Costa Rica	34:35.74	Diana Bogantes	27 June 2021	San José	R4
Philippines	34:40.3 h	Christabel Martes	17 May 2001	Manila	R4
Mauritius	34:43.31	Marie Perrier	13 April 2019	Pacé	R4
Zambia	34:46.40	Mirriam Kaumba	16 April 2005	Wichita	R4
Thailand	34:46.61	Jane Vongvorachoti	25 April 2013	Philadelphia	R4
Nepal	34:47.77	Santoshi Shrestha	26 October 2025	Ranchi	
Palestine	34:48.07	Mayada Al Sayad	7 May 2016	Celle	R4
Montenegro	34:57.0 h	Slađana Perunović	13 April 2014	Bar	R4
North Macedonia	35:00.30	Adrijana Pop Arsova	17 April 2022	Skopje	R4
Malawi	35:03.6 hA	Catherine Chikwakwa	3 July 2005	Harare	R4
Angola	35:06.9 h	Ernestina Paulino	2 August 2008	Luanda	R4
Mozambique	35:20.02	Hortencia Lichimane	14 September 2011	Maputo	R4
Ghana	35:27.23	Lydia Mato	14 May 2015	Hutchinson	R4
Andorra	35:41.96	Ariadna Fenes	30 May 2023	Marsa	
Iraq	35:44.93	Maisaa Hussein Matrood	2 August 1997	Athens	R4
Uruguay	35:56.58	Lorena Sosa	6 March 2021	Montevideo	R4
Singapore	36:00.95	Vanessa Lee Ying Zhuang	24 September 2026	Nagoya	
Syria	36:11.94	Zeinab Bakour	14 December 1998	Bangkok	R4
Armenia	36:12.00	Nune Avagian	30 May 1991	Krasnodar	R4
Egypt	36:17.1 h	Sarah Ahmed Abou Hassan	5 April 2007	Maadi	R4
Congo Republic	36:20.5 h	Clème Prudence Mambéké	8 July 2018	Brazzaville	R4
Gibraltar	36:23.35	Kim Baglietto	2 July 2015	Saint Clement	R4
U.S. Virgin Islands	36:27.71	Jackie Morgan	16 April 1999	Walnut	R4
Lebanon	36:31.80	Maria Nehme Pia	12 July 2019	Quebec	R4
Eswatini	36:46.75	Priscilla Mamba	17 September 1999	Johannesburg	R4
Cameroon	36:47.3 h	Tatou Tchinda	31 May 2010	Yaoundé	R4
Northern Mariana Islands	36:48.49	Nathania Tan	12 April 2024	Azusa	
Honduras	36:58.70	Yessica Carolina Espinal	7 May 2023	San José	
Laos	37:24.85	Inthakoumman Lodkeo	27 April 2023	Singapore	
Solomon Islands	37:54.60	Sharon Firisua	1 July 2017	Suva	R4
South Sudan	37:55.31	Falicia Oyo	25 June 2016	Durban	R4
Macao	38:52.01 (Note: ratified by AAMC; not recognized by World Athletics)	Hoi Long	22 October 2021	Xi'an	
Pakistan	40:42.7 h	Rabia Ashiq	21 April 2011	Lahore	R4
Bangladesh	42:34.1 h	Rinki Biswas	4 January 2022	Dhaka	R4
Bahamas	45:50.79	Jennaya Hield	29 March 2015	Towson	R4
Afghanistan	46:11.52	Shabnam Fayyaz	13 April 2019	Greencastle	R4
