= 2019 European Athletics U23 Championships – Men's 10,000 metres =

The men's 10,000 metres event at the 2019 European Athletics U23 Championships was held in Gävle, Sweden, at Gavlehof Stadium Park on 11 July.

== Records ==
Prior to the competition, the records were as follows:

European U23 record	Ali Kaya (TUR)	27:24.09	Mersin, Turkey	2 May 2015
Championship U23 record	Ali Kaya (TUR)	27:53.38	Tallinn, Estonia	9 July 2015

== Results ==
Rank	Name	Nationality	Time	Notes
1st place, gold medalist(s)	Jimmy Gressier	France	28:44.17	
2nd place, silver medalist(s)	Tadesse Getahon	Israel	28:46.97	
3rd place, bronze medalist(s)	Emile Cairess	Great Britain	28:50.21	
4	Nils Voigt	Germany	28:54.16	PB
5	Abdessamad Oukhelfen	Spain	28:54.19	
6	Narve Gilje Nordås	Norway	28:59.04	PB
7	Andrei Dorin Rusu	Romania	28:59.47	PB
8	Jake Smith	Great Britain	29:01.08	PB
9	Barry Keane	Ireland	29:01.57	PB
10	Godadaw Belachew	Israel	29:02.79	
11	Mohamed Mohumed	Germany	29:04.21	PB
12	Dorian Boulvin	Belgium	29:04.30	PB
13	Ahmed Ouhda	Italy	29:09.40	PB
14	Mahamed Mahamed	Great Britain	29:10.46	
15	Davor Aaron Bienenfeld	Germany	29:12.67	
16	Bukayaw Malede	Israel	29:17.57	SB
17	Sezgin Ataç	Turkey	29:36.45	
18	Mários Anagnóstou	Greece	29:36.64	PB
19	Garry Campbell	Ireland	30:24.94	
20	Dario De Caro	Italy	30:28.04	
21	Marcell Kovács	Hungary	30:37.72	
22	Clement Leduc	France	30:38.63	
23	Vadym Loskyy	Ukraine	31:20.51	
	Alberto Mondazzi	Italy	DNF	
	Yeoryios-Mihail Tassis	Greece	DNF	
