= 2026 European Athletics Championships – Men's 10,000 metres =

Men's 10,000 metres at the 2026 European Athletics Championships
- Venue: Alexander Stadium
- Location: Birmingham, United Kingdom
- Dates: 15 August 2026
- Competitors: 27 (target)
- Winning time: 27:23.44 CR

Medalists
gold medal	Andreas Almgren	Sweden
silver medal	Dominic Lokinyomo Lobalu	Switzerland
bronze medal	Jimmy Gressier	France

The men's 10,000 metres at the 2026 European Athletics Championships took place at the Alexander Stadium in Birmingham, United Kingdom, on 15 August 2026.

== Background ==
Records before the 2026 European Athletics Championships
Record	Athlete (nation)	Time	Location	Date
World record	Joshua Cheptegei (UGA)	26:11.00	Valencia, Spain	7 October 2020
European record	Mo Farah (GBR)	26:46.57	Eugene, United States	3 June 2011
Championship record	Martti Vainio (FIN)	27:30.99	Prague, Czechoslovakia	29 August 1978
World leading	Mohamed Abdilaahi (GER)	26:56.58	San Juan Capistrano, United States	28 March 2026
European leading	Mohamed Abdilaahi (GER)	26:56.58	San Juan Capistrano, United States	28 March 2026

== Qualification ==
For the men's 10,000 metres, the qualification period was from 27 January 2025 to 26 July 2026. Athletes qualified by running the entry standard of 27:50.00 min or faster, by wildcard for the 2024 European Athletics Champion, or by their position on the World Athletics Rankings for the event. The target number was 27 athletes.

Qualification standings per 31 July 2026
QP	CP	Country	Athlete	Status	Details
1	1	Switzerland	Dominic Lokinyomo Lobalu	Qualified by Wild Card	Defending European Champion
2	1	Germany	Mohamed Abdilaahi	Qualified by Entry Standard	26:56.58 - JSerra Catholic HS, San Juan Capistrano, CA (USA) - 28 MAR 2026
3	1	Netherlands	Mike Foppen	Qualified by Entry Standard	27:20.52 - JSerra Catholic HS, San Juan Capistrano, CA (USA) - 28 MAR 2026
4	1	Great Britain & N.I.	Scott Beattie	Qualified by Entry Standard	27:23.20 - JSerra Catholic HS, San Juan Capistrano, CA (USA) - 28 MAR 2026
5	2	Great Britain & N.I.	David Mullarkey	Qualified by Entry Standard	27:26.58 - JSerra Catholic HS, San Juan Capistrano, CA (USA) - 28 MAR 2026
6	2	Switzerland	Jonas Raess	Qualified by Entry Standard	27:36.96 - JSerra Catholic HS, San Juan Capistrano, CA (USA) - 29 MAR 2025
7	2	Netherlands	Mahadi Abdi Ali	Qualified by Entry Standard	27:40.96 - JSerra Catholic HS, San Juan Capistrano, CA (USA) - 28 MAR 2026
8	1	Italy	Yemaneberhan Crippa	Qualified by Entry Standard	27:43.23 - Stadio Comunale, Pergine Valsugana (ITA) - 13 JUN 2026
9	1	France	Simon Bédard	Qualified by Entry Standard	27:44.72 - JSerra Catholic HS, San Juan Capistrano, CA (USA) - 28 MAR 2026
10	1	Belgium	Simon Debognies	Qualified by Entry Standard	27:48.40 - Stade Complexe Sportif Jean-Paul Chasseboeuf, Pacé (FRA) - 24 MAY 2025
11	1	Sweden	Andreas Almgren	Qualified by Entry Standard	26:45 - Valencia (ESP) - 11 JAN 2026
12	3	Netherlands	Tim Verbaandert	Qualified by Entry Standard	27:17 - Lille (FRA) - 04 APR 2026
13	1	Norway	Magnus Tuv Myhre	Qualified by Entry Standard	27:22 - Valencia (ESP) - 11 JAN 2026
14	2	Belgium	Isaac Kimeli	Qualified by Entry Standard	27:29 - Valencia (ESP) - 11 JAN 2026
15	3	Great Britain & N.I.	Joseph Wigfield	Qualified by Entry Standard	27:38 - Valencia (ESP) - 11 JAN 2026
16	2	Italy	Francesco Guerra	Qualified by Entry Standard	27:39 - Lille (FRA) - 15 NOV 2025
17	1	Iceland	Baldvin Magnusson	Qualified by Entry Standard	27:40 - Valencia (ESP) - 11 JAN 2026
18	1	Ireland	Jack O'Leary	Qualified by Entry Standard	27:41 - Valencia (ESP) - 11 JAN 2026
19	3	Switzerland	Morgan Le Guen	Qualified by Entry Standard	27:42 - Valencia (ESP) - 11 JAN 2026
reserve	4	Great Britain & N.I.	Andrew Butchart	Qualified by Entry Standard	27:43 - Valencia (ESP) - 11 JAN 2026
20	1	Israel	Dereje Chekole	Qualified by Entry Standard	27:43 - Valencia (ESP) - 11 JAN 2026
21	2	France	Baptiste Guyon	Qualified by Entry Standard	27:46 - Valencia (ESP) - 11 JAN 2026
22	2	Israel	Zemenu Muchie	Qualified by Entry Standard	27:46 - Valencia (ESP) - 11 JAN 2026
23	1	Spain	Jesús Ramos	Qualified by Entry Standard	27:47 - Valencia (ESP) - 11 JAN 2026
24	3	France	Jimmy Gressier	Qualified by Entry Standard	27:47 - Troyes (FRA) - 10 MAY 2026
25	2	Spain	Abdessamad Oukhelfen	Qualified by Entry Standard	27:48 - Castellón (ESP) - 22 FEB 2026
26	3	Italy	Pasquale Selvarolo	Qualified by Entry Standard	27:48 - Lille (FRA) - 04 APR 2026
27	1	Finland	Mustafe Muuse	Qualified by Entry Standard	27:50 - Valencia (ESP) - 11 JAN 2026
reserve	3	Spain	Eduardo Menacho	Next best by World Rankings	21st - 1155 points
reserve	3	Belgium	Clément Deflandre	Next best by World Rankings	46th - 1116 points
reserve	2	Ireland	Cormac Dalton	Next best by World Rankings	55th - 1103 points
reserve	4	Italy	Konjoneh Maggi	Next best by World Rankings	62nd - 1097 points
reserve	4	Netherlands	Nathan Houwaard	Next best by World Rankings	63rd - 1097 points
reserve	1	Hungary	Gábor Karsai	Next best by World Rankings	64th - 1097 points
reserve	3	Ireland	Shay McEvoy	Next best by World Rankings	71st - 1091 points
reserve	1	Slovenia	Jan Kokalj	Next best by World Rankings	201st - 1010 points

Bye to semi-finals	Reserve activated	Withdrawal / reserve unused

== Schedule ==
Date	Time	Round
15 August 2026	20:25	Final

All times are local times (UTC+1)

== Results ==
Place	Athlete	Nation	Time	Notes
1st place, gold medalist(s)	Andreas Almgren	Sweden	27:23.44	CR, SB
2nd place, silver medalist(s)	Dominic Lokinyomo Lobalu	Switzerland	27:42.67	SB
3rd place, bronze medalist(s)	Jimmy Gressier	France	28:07.90	SB
4	Yemaneberhan Crippa	Italy	28:08.56	
5	Baptiste Guyon	France	28:20.61	
6	Magnus Tuv Myhre	Norway	28:21.25	SB
7	Abdessamad Oukhelfen	Spain	28:21.89	SB
8	Jonas Raess	Switzerland	28:22.41	SB
9	Simon Bédard	France	28:24.62	
10	Jack O'Leary	Ireland	28:24.89	SB
11	Simon Debognies	Belgium	28:25.55	
12	David Mullarkey	Great Britain & N.I.	28:25.58	
13	Baldvin Magnússon	Iceland	28:25.67	NR
14	Dereje Chekole	Israel	28:31.28	SB
15	Scott Beattie	Great Britain & N.I.	28:50.35	
16	Mahadi Abdi Ali	Netherlands	29:05.68	
17	Joseph Wigfield	Great Britain & N.I.	29:09.43	
18	Mustafe Muuse	Finland	29:17.11	PB
19	Zemenu Muchie	Israel	29:26.22	SB
20	Pasquale Selvarolo	Italy	29:33.43	
21	Jesús Ramos	Spain	30:28.30	
	Mike Foppen	Netherlands	DNF	
	Isaac Kimeli	Belgium	DNF	
	Francesco Guerra	Italy	DNF	
	Tim Verbaandert	Netherlands	DNF	
