= Yann Schrub =

French runner

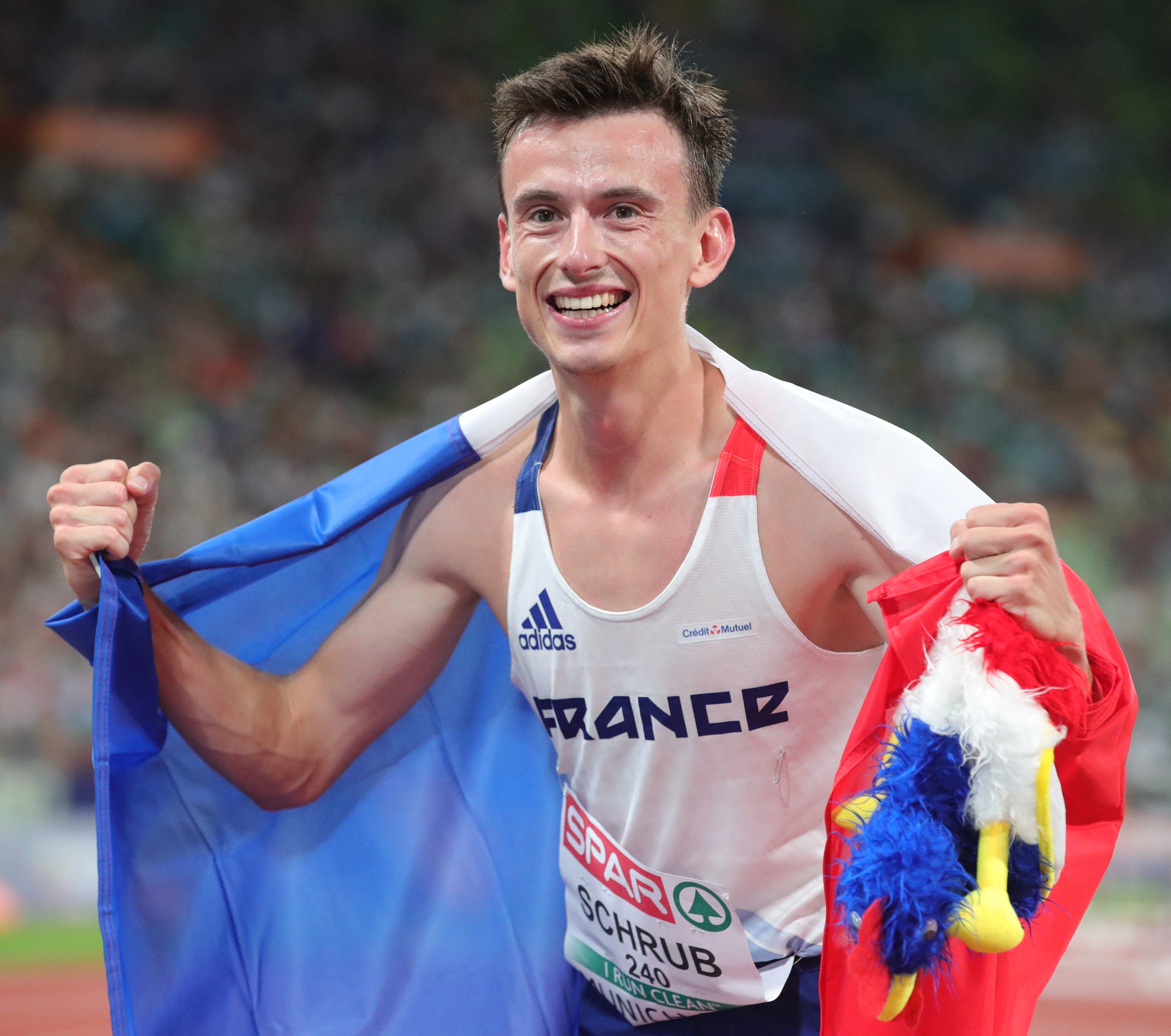
- Schrub at the 2022 European Athletics Championships in Munich

Personal information
- Born: 20 March 1996 (age 30) Thionville, France

Sport
- Sport: Athletics
- Events: Middle-, Long-distance running

Achievements and titles
- Personal bests: 1500 m: 3:31.42 (Decines 2025); 3000 m: 7:29.38i (Metz 2026); 5000 m: 12:56.57 (Paris 2025); 10,000 m: 27:47.13 (Munich 2022); 5 km: 12:56 (Lille 2026); 10 km: 26:43 P AR (Castellón 2026)
Medal record
Men's athletics
Representing France
World Indoor Championships
Bronze medal – third place	2026 Toruń	3000 m
European Championships
Silver medal – second place	2024 Rome	10,000 m
Bronze medal – third place	2022 Munich	10,000 m
European Cross Country Championships
Gold medal – first place	2018 Tilburg	U23 team
Gold medal – first place	2021 Dublin	Senior team
Gold medal – first place	2022 Turin	Senior team
Gold medal – first place	2023 Brussels	Senior race
European Running Championships
Gold medal – first place	2025 Brussels	10000 metres

Yann Schrub (born 20 March 1996) is a French middle- and long-distance runner. In the 10,000 metres, he won the bronze medal at the 2022 European Athletics Championships and the silver medal at the 2024 European Athletics Championships.

Schrub is a two-time French national champion.

In December 2023 he won a gold medal at the 2023 European Cross Country Championships in Brussels.

== Achievements ==
=== International competitions ===
Representing France
Year	Competition	Venue	Position	Event	Result
2013	World Youth Championships	Donetsk, Ukraine	10th (h1)	3000 m	8:57.41
2017	European 10,000m Cup	Minsk, Belarus	22nd	10,000 m	30:30.43
2018	European 10,000m Cup	London, United Kingdom	47th	10,000 m	29:35.23
2018	European Cross Country Championships	Tilburg, Netherlands	18th	XC 8.3km U23	24:25
2018	European Cross Country Championships	Tilburg, Netherlands	1st	U23 team	11 pts
2019	Summer Universiade	Naples, Italy	2nd	5000 m	14:03.24
2019	European Cross Country Championships	Lisbon, Portugal	18th	XC 10.3km	31:12
2021	European 10,000m Cup	Birmingham, United Kingdom	5th	10,000 m	27:49.64 PB
2021	European Cross Country Championships	Dublin, Ireland	6th	XC 10.0km	30:39
2021	European Cross Country Championships	Dublin, Ireland	1st	Senior team	13 pts
2022	European 10,000m Cup	Pacé, France	4th	10,000 m	27:59.32 SB
2022	European Championships	Munich, Germany	3rd	10,000 m	27:47.13 PB
2022	European Cross Country Championships	Turin, Italy	7th	XC 9.572 km	29:52
2022	European Cross Country Championships	Turin, Italy	1st	Senior team	24 pts
2023	World Championships	Budapest, Hungary	9th	10,000 m	28:07.42
2023	European Cross Country Championships	Brussels, Belgium	1st	XC 10 km	30:17
2023	European Cross Country Championships	Brussels, Belgium	2nd	Senior team	26 pts
2024	European Championships	Rome, Italy	2nd	10,000 m	28:00.48
2024	Olympic Games	Paris, France	12th	5000 m	13:20.63
2024	Olympic Games	Paris, France	–	10,000 m	DNF
2025	European Running Championships	Brussels-Leuven, Belgium	3rd	10 km	27:37
2025	World Championships	Tokyo, Japan	9th	5000 m	13:01.34
2026	World Indoor Championships	Toruń, Poland	3rd	3000 m	7:35.71

=== National titles ===
- French Athletics Championships
  - 10,000 metres: 2018
- French Indoor Athletics Championships
  - 3000 metres: 2017
