= 2017 European Athletics U23 Championships – Men's 10,000 metres =

The men's 10,000 metres event at the 2017 European Athletics U23 Championships was held in Bydgoszcz, Poland, at Zdzisław Krzyszkowiak Stadium on 13 July.

== Records ==
Prior to the competition, the records were as follows:

European U23 record	Ali Kaya (TUR)	27:24.09	Mersin, Turkey	2 May 2015
Championship U23 record	Ali Kaya (TUR)	27:53.38	Tallinn, Estonia	9 July 2015

== Results ==
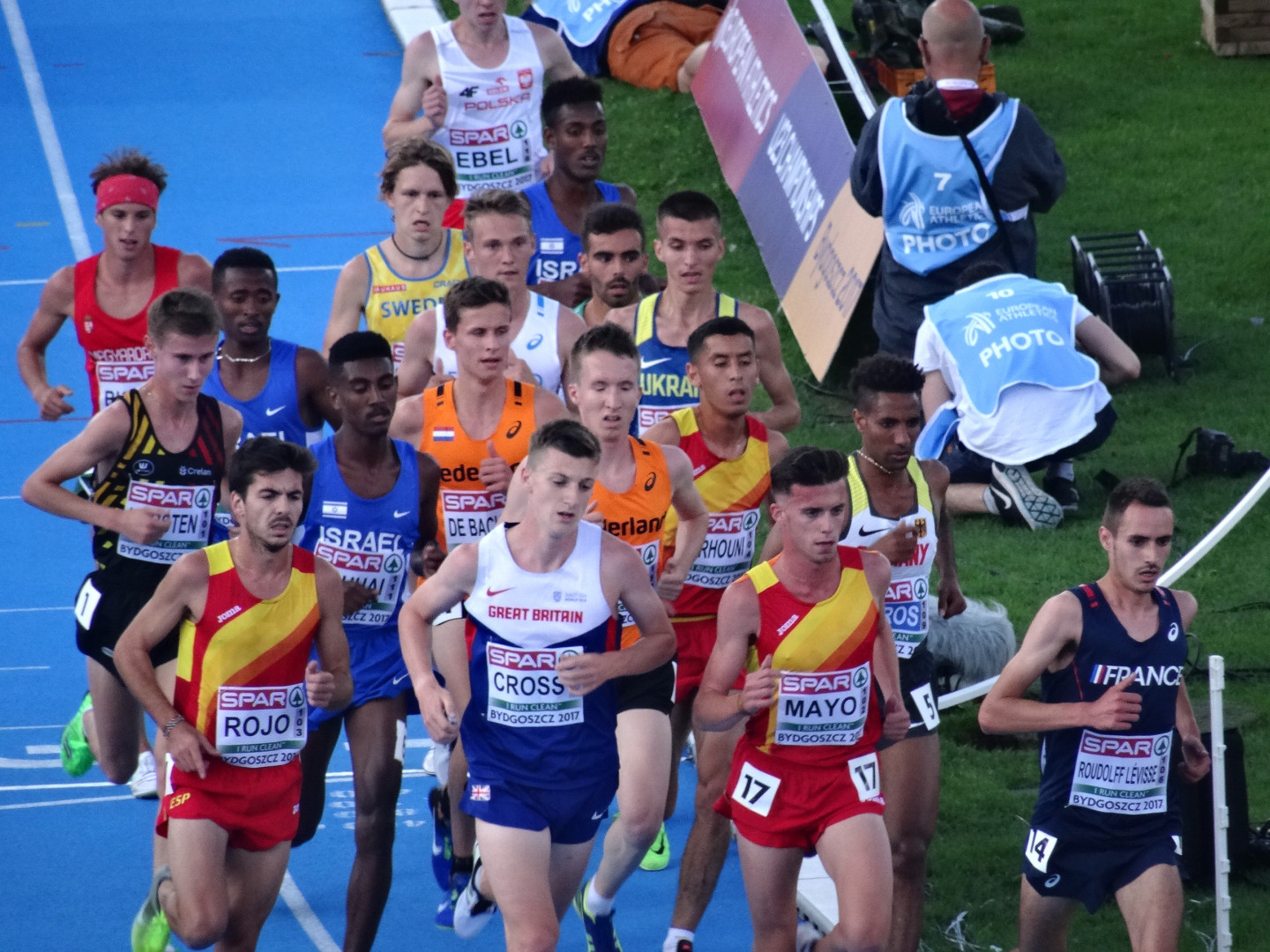
The race underway

Rank	Name	Nationality	Time	Notes
1st place, gold medalist(s)	Carlos Mayo	Spain	29:28.06	
2nd place, silver medalist(s)	Amanal Petros	Germany	29:34.94	
3rd place, bronze medalist(s)	Emmanuel Roudolff Lévisse	France	29:42.85	
4	Mohamed Zarhouni	Spain	29:52.02	
5	Ellis Cross	Great Britain	29:53.64	
6	Tobias Blum	Germany	29:54.02	
7	Bence Bicsák	Hungary	29:54.82	
8	Mykola Nyzhnyk	Ukraine	29:55.97	
9	Bart van Nunen	Netherlands	29:56.31	
10	Shmuel Abuhai	Israel	30:09.37	
11	Robin Ryynänen	Finland	30:14.14	
12	Yago Rojo	Spain	30:23.09	
13	Manuel de Backer	Netherlands	30:25.08	
14	Dieter Kersten	Belgium	30:36.63	
15	Tadesse Getahon	Israel	30:37.49	
16	Bukayaw Malede	Israel	31:02.24	
17	Grzegorz Ebel	Poland	31:02.43	
18	Miguel Marques	Portugal	31:08.92	
	Gabriel Steffensen	Sweden	DNF	
