= Dominic Lokinyomo Lobalu =

Swiss middle- and long-distance runner (born 1998)

Dominic Lobalu
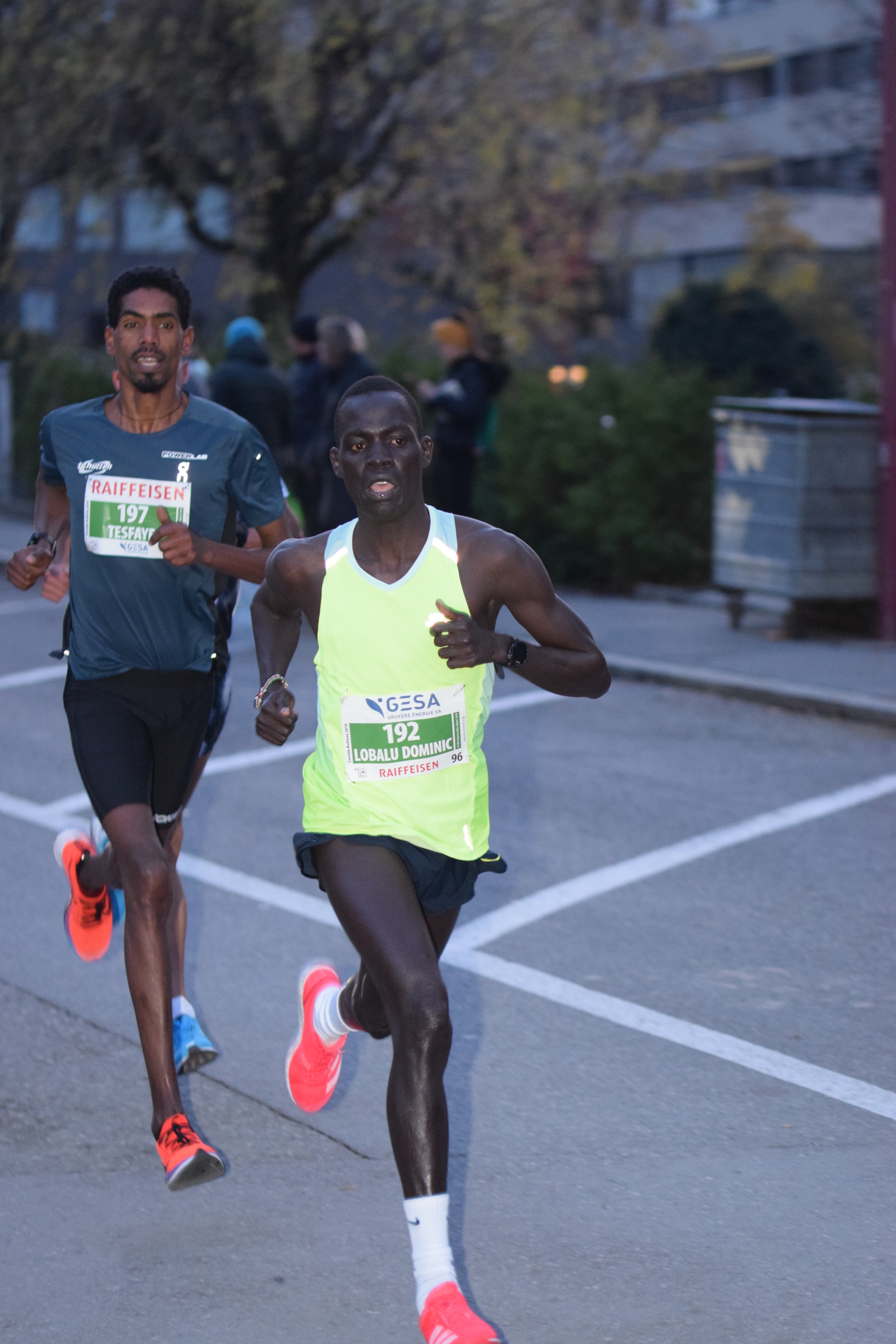
- Lobalu at the 2019 Corrida Bulloise

Personal information
- Full name: Dominic Lokinyomo Lobalu
- National team: ART (2016–2019)
- Born: 16 August 1998 (age 28) Chukudum, Sudan (present-day South Sudan)

Sport
- Sport: Track and field
- Event: 1500 metres – Half marathon
- Club: LC Brühl/On (2019–); Tegla Loroupe Peace Foundation (2016–2019)
- Coached by: Markus Hagmann (2019–); Tegla Loroupe (2016—2019)

Achievements and titles
- Personal bests: Outdoor; 800 m: 1:50.90 (Thun 2023); 1500 m: 3:34.39 (Lausanne 2024); 3000 m: 7:27.68 (London 2024) NR; 5000 m: 12:50.87 (Oslo 2025) NR; 10,000 m: 27:13 (Valencia 2024); Half marathon: 59:12 (Copenhagen 2022) NR; Indoor; 3000 m: 7:50.59 (Magglingen 2022) NR
Medal record
Men's athletics
Representing Switzerland
| Event | 1st | 2nd | 3rd |
|---|---|---|---|
| European Championships | 1 | 1 | 1 |
| Total | 1 | 1 | 1 |
European Championships
| Gold medal – first place | 2024 Rome | 10,000 m |
| Silver medal – second place | 2026 Birmingham | 10,000 m |
| Bronze medal – third place | 2024 Rome | 5000 m |
European Cross Country Championships
| Bronze medal – third place | 2025 Lagoa | Senior Men |

Dominic Lokinyomo Lobalu (born 16 August 1998) is a South Sudanese born middle and long-distance runner who represents Switzerland in international championships. He currently lives and trains in Switzerland and competes for On Running.

Lobalu left South Sudan when he was 8 and took refuge in Kenya. He took up running at the age of 15, and trained as part of the Athlete Refugee Team. He competed for the team in the 1500 metres at the 2017 World Championships in Athletics. In May 2019, he competed in the Geneva Marathon and decided to permanently settle in Switzerland.

In 2022, he set South Sudanese national records in the 1500 metres, 3000 metres, 5000 metres and 10,000 metres. He won the 3000 m at the BAUHAUS-galan in Stockholm, Sweden setting a world leading time of 7:29.48.

At the 2024 European Athletics Championships, he won the gold medal in 10,000 metres and the bronze medal in 5000 metres.

== Early life and background ==
Dominic Lokinyomo Lobalu was born on 16 August 1998 in Chukudum, a small and remote village located in the southeast corner of Sudan (present-day South Sudan), only 25 kilometers away from the border of Kenya and Uganda. He is from the Didinga tribe. He lost both of his parents at age 9 due to the Second Sudanese Civil War, a conflict which lasted from 1983 to 2005 and devastated Sudan. The political unrest caused him and his four sisters to flee their village in Chukudum to neighbouring Kenya.

He spent the next 10 years staying at an orphanage—separated from his sisters—for a short period of time in mid-2007 before crossing over into a town outside of Nairobi with the assistance of an Italian non-governmental organization. There, he went to school and played football. But, he transitioned to running at age 15 because of its individual nature. He received an offer in September 2016 from an athletics training camp associated with the Tegla Loroupe Peace Foundation.

Tegla Loroupe, a famous Kenyan long-distance runner, noticed his skills and recruited him to be a member of the Athlete Refugee Team (ART). She and World Athletics formed the programme in 2014 as an initiative to provide support to the growing number of refugees in camps throughout the globe. Aspiring runners develop their athletic skills as well as engage in prestigious high level competitions, ranging from the Olympics to the World Championships. Lobalu viewed running as a way to attain a better life and trained under her for three years in Ngong, Kenya.

== Career ==
=== 2017–2018 ===
Lobalu's debut at the 2017 World Relays in Nassau, Bahamas on 5 April marked the beginning of his professional career. He and his teammates did the 4 × 800 metres relay and came in seventh place. Just shy of his 19th birthday, he went to the 2017 World Championships in London, United Kingdom on 10 August. He concluded the second heat of 1500 metres without advancing forward to the final rounds. After, he increased his distance to the 5000 metres at the 2018 African Championships in Asaba, Nigeria on 5 August. He finished in 11th place.

=== 2019: Sudden Departure from the Athlete Refugee Team ===
Altogether, Lobalu's time with the Athlete Refugee Team consisted of only a handful of events. It ended unexpectedly on 11 May 2019 at the Harmony Geneva Marathon for UNICEF. He travelled from Kenya to run in the 10 kilometres. Following his win, he decided to leave the Athlete Refugee Team unannounced and snuck out of the team's hotel room. He was supposed to return to Kenya the day after the marathon, however, he adamantly chose to remain in Switzerland no matter the consequences. As a result, he changed the course of his career and drastically crushed his chances of being selected for the 2020 Olympics in Tokyo, Japan.

Prior to his abrupt departure, he questioned his managers about the prize money for the Geneva Marathon but they informed him that there was no prize money. He thought that their responses to him were evasive and it led him to believe that they were hiding something. According to Lobalu, the managers' perception of the refugees was that they "should accept whatever they had, whether there was prize money or not". He frowned upon this idea. His fellow athletes shared similar sentiments concerning "rising tensions over their training" and cited "dissatisfaction with a system that, to them, appeared to deny them opportunities to create lives outside the program" as contributing factors to their defection. The International Olympic Committee (IOC) and United Nations Human Rights Council (UNHRC) delivered a ruling in July 2021 that disallowed Lobalu and Gai John Nyang—another athlete who absconded while in Mainz, Germany—from being on the Refugee Olympic Team (ROT). The two organisations feared that more of the refugees might be encouraged to imitate the rogue actions of Lobalu and Nyang.

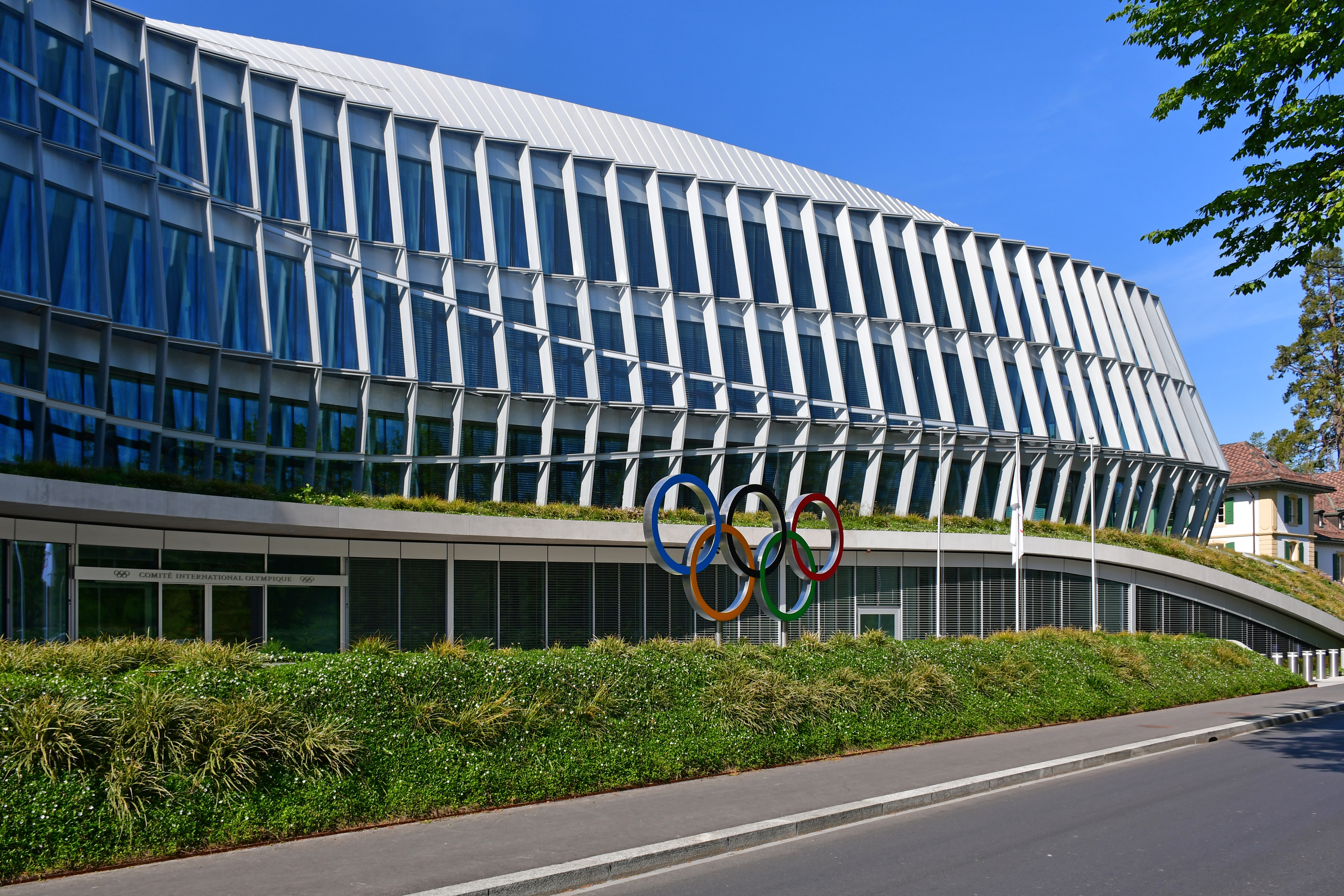
The IOC excluded Lobalu from the Refugee Olympic Team in 2021

Gatkuoth Puok Thiep, a South Sudanese runner wanting to hastily exit the Athlete Refugee Team in the same manner, accompanied Lobalu as they wandered the streets of Geneva without any money or local contacts. Eventually, they applied for asylum at a Swiss refugee centre and continued pursuing their running ambitions. An immigration officer at the centre connected the men to Coach Markus Hagmann, who subsequently invited them to LC Brühl in St. Gallen.

=== 2022: Diamond League Victory ===
Lobalu's success at the Diamond League in Stockholm on 30 June was a big surprise, because he managed to beat the half-marathon world champion Jacob Kiplimo, among other medallists in the 3000 metres. Prior to that point, he had been mainly unknown and obscure. However, he immediately elevated his status thanks to his world leading time of 7:29.48. During the race, he hung out close to the back of the pack but finally made his move around the last 200 metres. He quickly picked up his pace and charged straight ahead of everyone else to catch Kiplimo. They battled head-to-head for a few seconds as they headed toward the home stretch. Kiplimo refused to relinquish his position at the front and fought to maintain a wider gap between them. Ultimately, Lobalu overtook him just before they crossed the finish line. It was Lobalu's first Diamond League win and the first ever for his sponsor On. His stellar results were a slight glimpse of what was to come in the future. Furthermore, he asserted his role as a promising world-class athlete, in spite of being a refugee.

=== 2023: Zagreb Meeting Record ===
Lobalu won the Hanžeković Memorial in Zagreb, Croatia on 10 September. During the process, he set a new meeting record of 7:33.95 in the 3000 metres. He defeated Henrik Ingebrigtsen in his scrimmage for the number one spot by sprinting to the finish line in the last lap. Thanks to his big win, Lobalu received an invitation to the final stage of the Diamond League in Eugene. He could have potentially been crowned the 5000 metres champion for the 2023 season at the Prefontaine Classic, however, his Swiss residence permit presents problems entering the United States, as is typical for refugee athletes to encounter.

He won the silver medal at 10.000 meters at the 2026 European Championship in Birmingham.

== The Right to Race documentary ==
A 30-minute documentary about Dominic Lobalu called The Right to Race was released at the Cannes Lions International Festival of Creativity on 20 June 2023, which is World Refugee Day. On, the Swiss sportswear company, collaborated with Lobalu to create the project. Australian filmmaker Richard Bullock played a role in writing and directing it, alongside Hungry Man Productions. The short film chronicles various moments in Lobalu's journey to become an elite athlete and details his prominent rise to the running world stage.

Highlights from it include features of Lobalu's coach, Markus Hagmann. Although they struggled initially to communicate, given that Lobalu spoke little English or German, their bond grew instantly over their interest in athletics. Coach Hagmann recognised Lobalu's talent as soon as he saw Lobalu run. Hagmann started working with him and put him in small races which Lobalu performed well in. Later, Lobalu would gradually go on to compete against some of the biggest names in his sport and break several South Sudanese records.

Additionally, The Right to Race tackles an important issue affecting many refugee athletes who are currently stateless in the wake of the refugee crisis: national identity and sense of belonging. Audiences get to see the difficulties that countless others like Lobalu experience when they attempt to enter major international events such as the Olympics. In most cases, they need to either obtain a special visa if possible or accept missing out on large portions of sports meetings outside of their new home countries. Lobalu hopes to make it to the Olympics. Despite having shown on multiple occasions that he is capable of challenging the top contenders in his field, he is ineligible to participate without a national identity—the central and reoccurring theme throughout the video.

His options to escape his legal limbo are minimal. The International Olympic Committee has strict protocols limiting who can join the Refugee Olympic Team. His previous separation from the Athlete Refugee Team, in favour of the safety of Switzerland, disqualified him from being considered a refugee under the legal criteria since he no longer actively faces the risk of persecution or threat of violence where he resides. As it stands, Switzerland requires that Lobalu wait up to 10 years—with 2031 being the earliest he could apply for naturalisation—in order to gain citizenship in the country.

=== Swiss Athletics Intervention and World Athletics Nationality Review Panel ===
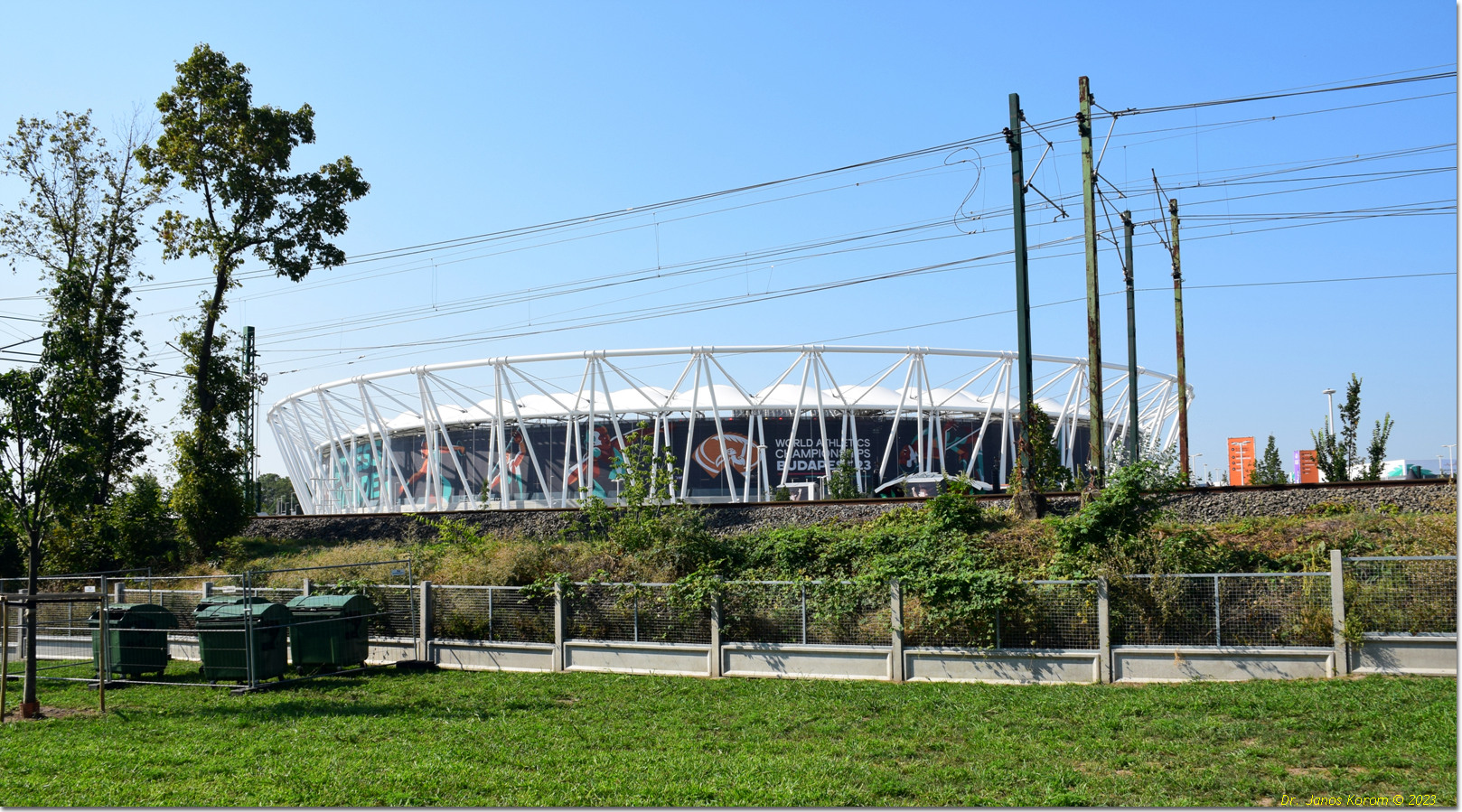
Swiss Athletics petitioned World Athletics, on behalf of Lobalu, to let him register for the World Championships

The Swiss Athletics Federation, on 6 April 2023, requested that the World Athletics Nationality Review Panel grant Lobalu a spot back on the Athlete Refugee Team so that he can represent Switzerland at the 2023 World Championships in Budapest, Hungary and potentially the 2024 Olympics in Paris, France. While proceeded, it was temporarily unclear how the panel would choose to proceed. Lobalu's situation is unique and World Athletics was reluctant to authorise him into the World Championships as a Swiss competitor. Instead, it repeated reservations that the IOC raised about the pressing matter in July 2021, right as the 2020 Olympics neared. The panel critically asked:

- How could Lobalu represent a nation of which he is not a citizen?
- Who does the medal or award go to in that case? Would it be the individual or the nation?
- If it approves Lobalu, then what is to stop athletes from switching nationalities?

Lobalu anticipated an answer from the panel before the World Championships commenced on 19 August 2023. However, when the date arrived, he was absent from the Swiss delegation. An official update was made available on 4 September 2023 determining that he can start for Switzerland beginning on 6 April 2026 based on the condition that he must 'strengthen his ties' to the country. Although his presence at the 2024 Olympics is still uncertain, he and his coach keep up their spirits about reaching a suitable resolution.

Lobalu's legal representatives are carefully reading over the terms of his eligibility and might appeal the time frame designated by the panel. They would prefer that Lobalu instantly be allowed to compete for Switzerland as opposed to waiting three years. Following the decision, Lobalu expressed gratitude toward the panel and Swiss Athletics but pointed out that "there is still a long way to go". He repeated that he wants to run today, rather than tomorrow, "for the country and the people who, as a refugee, made [him] feel at home for the first time in [his] life".

== Achievements ==
Information from his World Athletics profile unless otherwise noted.

=== International competitions ===
| Year | Competition | Venue | Position | Event | Time | Notes |
Representing the Athlete Refugee Team (2016–2019, 2024)
| 2017 | World Relays | Nassau, Bahamas | 7th | 4 × 800 m relay | 8:12.57 | |
| 2017 | World Championships | London, United Kingdom | 40th (h) | 1500 m | 3:52.78 | PB |
| 2018 | African Championships | Asaba, Nigeria | 11th | 5000 m | 14:07.22 | |
| 2024 | Olympic Games | Paris, France | 4th | 5000 m | 13:15.27 | |
Representing Switzerland
| 2024 | European Championships | Rome, Italy | 1st | 10,000 m | 28:00.32 | |
| 2025 | European Running Championships | Leuven, Belgium | – | 10 km | DNF | |
| 2025 | World Championships | Tokyo, Japan | 11th (h) | 5000 m | 13:19.57 | |
| 2025 | World Championships | Tokyo, Japan | 14th | 10,000 m | 29:11.65 | |
| 2026 | European Championships | Birmingham, United Kingdom | 7th | 5000 m | 13:18.24 | |
| 2026 | European Championships | Birmingham, United Kingdom | 2nd | 10,000 m | 27:42.67 | |

=== Circuit wins and titles ===
- Diamond League

(3000 metres wins, other events specified in parentheses)
- 2022: Stockholm Bauhaus-Galan (WL)

- World Athletics Continental Tour

(3000 metres wins, other events specified in parentheses)
- 2022: Bellinzona Galà dei Castelli

- IAAF World Challenge

(3000 metres wins, other events specified in parentheses)
- 2023: Zagreb Hanžeković Memorial (MR)

== See also ==
- National records in the 1500 metres
- National records in the 10,000 metres
- List of South Sudanese records in athletics
- Sport in South Sudan
- Refugees of Sudan
