= 2019 European Athletics U23 Championships – Men's 5000 metres =

The men's 5000 metres event at the 2019 European Athletics U23 Championships was held in Gävle, Sweden, at Gavlehof Stadium Park on 13 July.

== Results ==
Rank	Name	Nationality	Time	Notes
1st place, gold medalist(s)	Jimmy Gressier	France	14:16.55	
2nd place, silver medalist(s)	Hugo Hay	France	14:17.00	
3rd place, bronze medalist(s)	Abdessamad Oukhelfen	Spain	14:17.23	
4	Tadesse Getahon	Israel	14:17.43	
5	Suldan Hassan	Sweden	14:19.96	
6	Tariku Novales	Spain	14:22.76	
7	Said Mechaal	Spain	14:24.41	
8	Elzan Bibić	Serbia	14:26.40	
9	Mohamed Mohumed	Germany	14:27.36	
10	Francesco Breusa	Italy	14:27.91	
11	Petros Surafel	Great Britain	14:28.63	
12	Godadaw Belachew	Israel	14:29.32	
13	Fabien Palcau	France	14:31.83	
14	Sebastiano Parolini	Italy	14:32.72	
15	William Fuller	Great Britain	14:32.86	
16	Jens Mergenthaler	Germany	14:38.32	
17	Fearghal Curtin	Ireland	14:39.50	
18	Micheal Power	Ireland	14:40.59	
19	Jennen Mortier	Belgium	14:42.00	
20	Devin Meyrer	Germany	14:43.63	
21	Pierre Murchan	Ireland	15:00.23	
22	Emil Danielsson	Sweden	15:06.67	
23	Dillon Cassar	Malta	15:30.77	PB
	Dorin Andrei Rusu	Romania	DNF	
	Dario Ivanovski	North Macedonia	DNS	
