= Tariku Novales =

Spanish long-distance runner (born 1998)

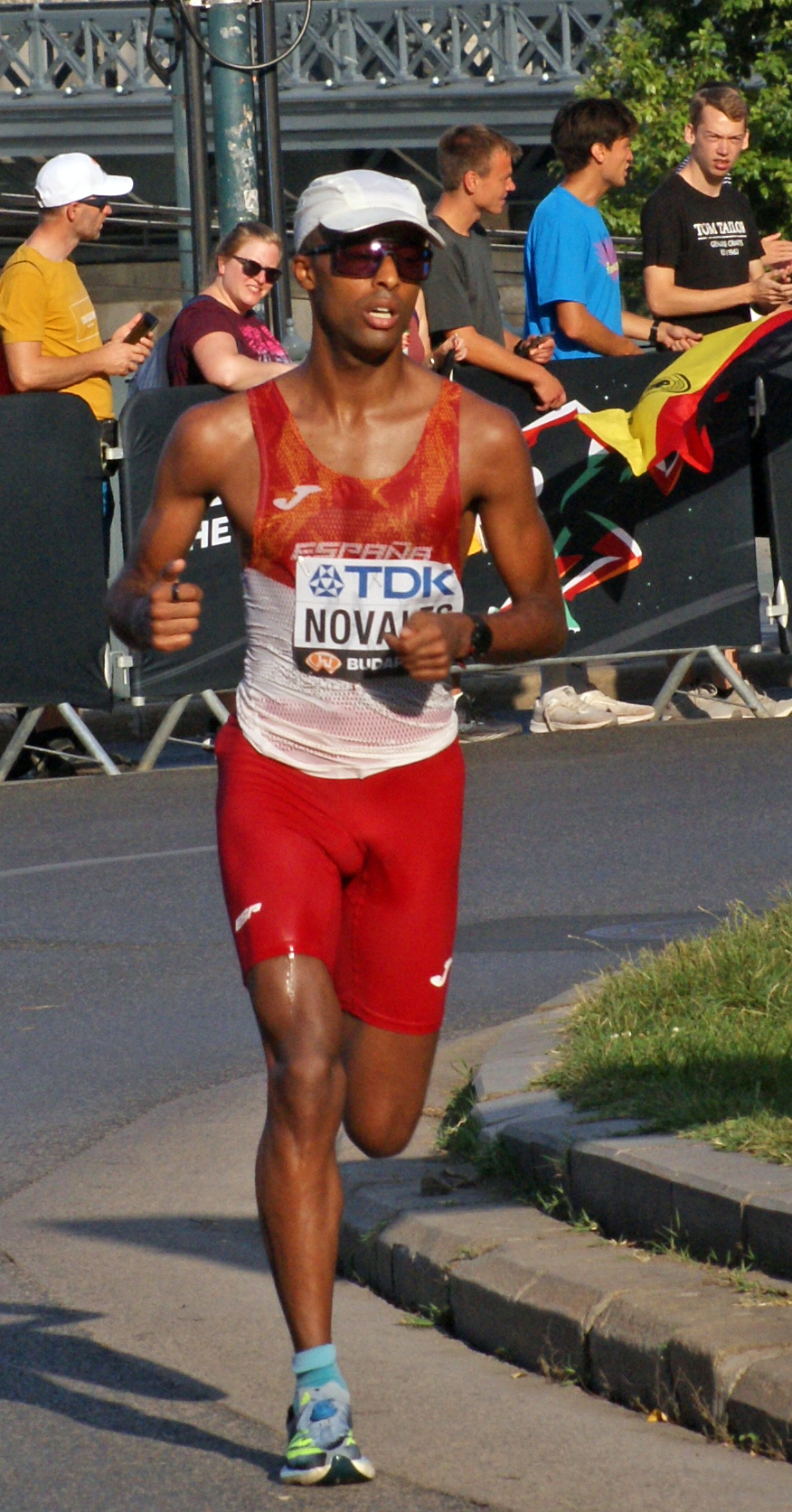

Personal information
- Full name: Tariku Novales Quinteiro
- Born: 8 March 1998 (age 27) Jijiga, Ethiopia
- Height: 1.78 m (5 ft 10 in)
- Weight: 59 kg (130 lb)

Sport
- Country: Spain
- Sport: Track and field
- Event: Marathon

Tariku Novales Quinteiro (born 8 March 1998) is a long-distance runner who specialises in the marathon. Born in Ethiopia, he was adopted at 6 years old from an orphanage in Addis Abeba by a Spanish couple. He represents Spain internationally.

== Personal bests ==
Outdoor

- 5000 metres - 13:33.08 (Oordegem, 2019)
- 10,000 metres – 29:24.66 (Burjassot, 2019)
- Half marathon – 1:01:46 (Valencia, 2021)
- Marathon – 2:05:48 (Valencia, 2023)

== Achievements ==
| Year | Competition | Venue | Position | Event | Notes |
Representing Spain
| 2014 | European Youth Olympic Trials | Baku, Azerbaijan | 6th | 1500 m | 3:58.59 |
| 2015 | World Youth Championships | Cali, Colombia | 12th | 3000 m | 8:40.88 |
| 2017 | European U20 Championships | Grosseto, Italy | 2nd | 5000 m | 14:44.66 |
| 2017 | Mediterranean U23 Championships | Jesolo, Italy | 2nd | 5000 m | 14:39.57 |
| 2019 | European U23 Championships | Gävle, Sweden | 6th | 5000 m | 14:22.76 |
| 2023 | World Championships | Budapest, Hungary | 21st | Marathon | 2:12:39 |
| 2024 | Olympic Games | Paris, France | 68th | Marathon | 2:25:50 |
