= Jake Smith (runner) =

British long-distance runner (born 1998)

Personal information
- Born: 19 May 1998 (age 28)

Sport
- Country: United Kingdom
- Sport: Athletics
- Event: Long-distance running
- Team: NN Running Team

Jake Smith (born 19 May 1998) is a British long-distance runner. In 2020, he competed in the men's race at the 2020 World Athletics Half Marathon Championships held in Gdynia, Poland.

== Career ==
In 2019, he finished in 8th place in the men's 10,000 metres event at the 2019 European Athletics U23 Championships held in Gävle, Sweden.

In April 2021, he ran his first full marathon in a time of 2:11:00 having originally planned to run as a pacer competing only part of the course.

In 2023, Smith revealed he had been diagnosed with RED-S and was taking a break from running.
