= 2022 European Athletics Championships – Men's 10,000 metres =

Men's 10,000 metres at the 2022 European Athletics Championships
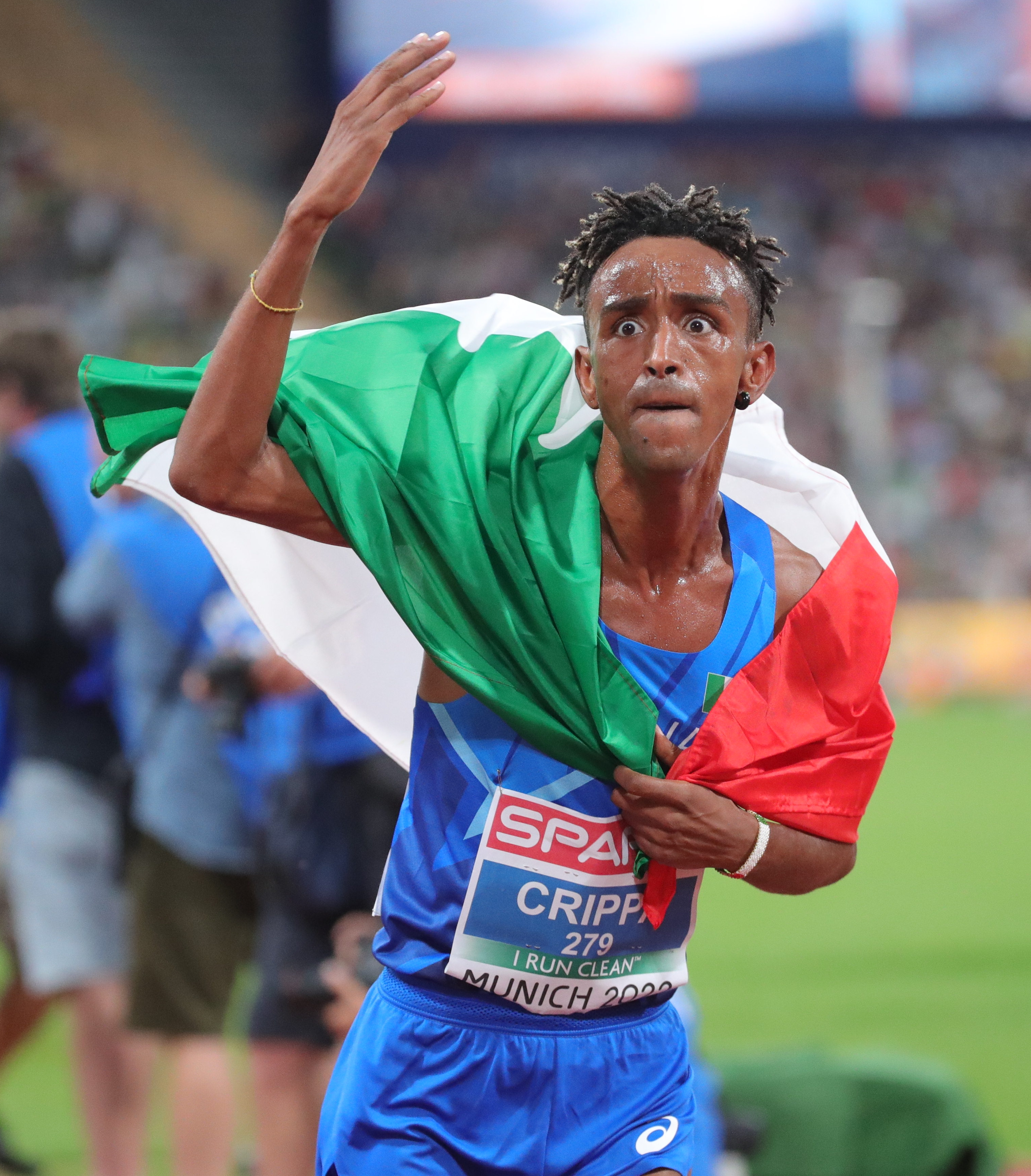
- Venue: Olympiastadion
- Location: Munich
- Dates: 21 August
- Competitors: 26 from 13 nations
- Winning time: 27:46.13

Medalists
gold medal	Yemaneberhan Crippa	Italy
silver medal	Zerei Kbrom Mezngi	Norway
bronze medal	Yann Schrub	France

The men's 10,000 metres at the 2022 European Athletics Championships took place at the Olympiastadion on 21 August.

== Records ==
Standing records prior to the 2022 European Athletics Championships
World record	Joshua Cheptegei (UGA)	26:11.00	Valencia, Spain	7 October 2020
European record	Mo Farah (GBR)	26:46.57	Eugene, United States	3 June 2011
Championship record	Martti Vainio (FIN)	27:30.99	Prague, Czechoslovakia	29 August 1978
World Leading	Grant Fisher (USA)	26:33.83	San Juan Capistrano, United States	6 March 2022
Europe Leading	Yemaneberhan Crippa (ITA)	27:16.18	London, Great Britain	14 May 2022

== Schedule ==
Date	Time	Round
21 August 2022	20:00	Final

All times are local times (UTC+2)

== Results ==
The race was started at 21:00.

Rank	Name	Nationality	Time	Note
1st place, gold medalist(s)	Yemaneberhan Crippa	Italy	27:46.13	
2nd place, silver medalist(s)	Zerei Kbrom Mezngi	Norway	27:46.94	PB
3rd place, bronze medalist(s)	Yann Schrub	France	27:47.13	PB
4	Jimmy Gressier	France	27:49.84	
5	Pietro Riva	Italy	27:50.51	PB
6	Efrem Gidey	Ireland	27:59.22	PB
7	Magnus Tuv Myhre	Norway	28:02.18	PB
8	Nils Voigt	Germany	28:02.19	
9	Samuel Fitwi Sibhatu	Germany	28:03.92	PB
10	Tadesse Getahon	Israel	28:04.37	PB
11	Emile Cairess	Great Britain	28:07.37	
12	Marc Scott	Great Britain	28:07.72	SB
13	Simon Debognies	Belgium	28:08.60	
14	Roberto Aláiz	Spain	28:14.86	
15	Yoann Kowal	France	28:17.39	
16	Aras Kaya	Turkey	28:23.77	
17	Juan Antonio Pérez	Spain	28:38.21	
18	Hiko Tonosa Haso	Ireland	28:38.82	
19	Filimon Abraham	Germany	28:53.54	
20	Bjørnar Sandnes Lillefosse	Norway	28:59.67	
21	Michael Somers	Belgium	29:10.13	
22	Andreas Vojta	Austria	29:56.71	
	Isaac Kimeli	Belgium	DNF	
	Sam Atkin	Great Britain	DNF	
	Samuel Barata	Portugal	DNF	
	Jamal Abdelmaji Eisa Mohammed	ART	DNF	
