= Emile Cairess =

British long-distance runner (born 1997)

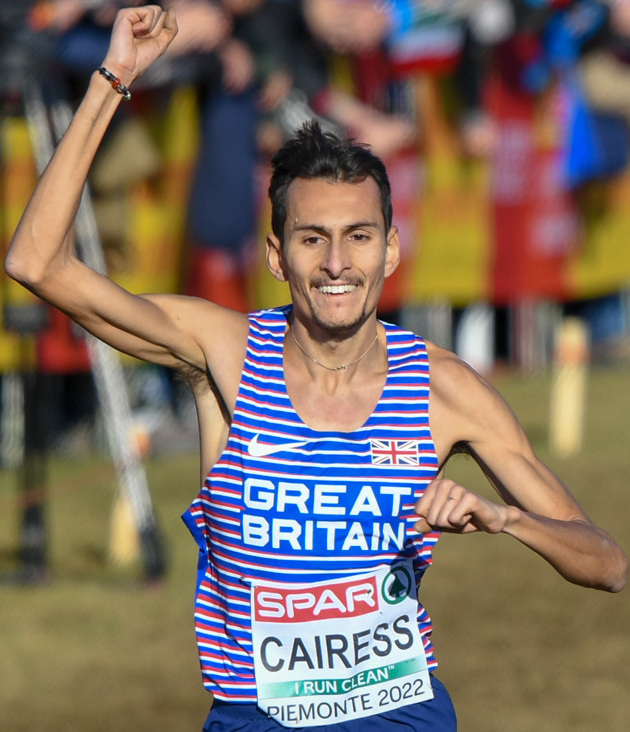
- Cairess at the 2022 European Cross Country Championships in Turin

Personal information
- Nationality: British (English)
- Born: 27 December 1997 (age 28) Bradford, England
- Education: St Mary's University, Twickenham

Sport
- Sport: Athletics
- Event: Long-distance running
- Club: Leeds City AC
- Coached by: Renato Canova

Achievements and titles
- Olympic finals: 2024 Marathon, 4th
Medal record
Men's athletics
Representing Great Britain
European U23 Championships
Bronze medal – third place	2019 Gävle	10,000 m
European Cross Country Championships
Silver medal – second place	2018 Tilburg	U23 team
Silver medal – second place	2022 Turin	Senior race
World Marathon Majors
Bronze medal – third place	2024 London	Marathon

Emile Michael John Cairess (born 27 December 1997) is a British long-distance runner. He won the bronze medal in the 10,000 metres at the 2019 European Under-23 Championships and a silver for the men's race at the 2022 European Cross Country Championships. Cairess is the European record holder for the road 10 miles. He finished fourth in the marathon in the 2024 Summer Olympics, the highest position for a British runner for over 20 years.

== Early life ==
Cairess was born in Bradford and grew up in Saltaire. He won a bursary to attend Bradford Grammar School, completing his A Levels in 2016. He then studied at St Mary's University, Twickenham.

== Career ==
During the under-23 race at the 2018 European Cross Country Championships, Emile Cairess fell over at half-mile stage but managed to move up 59 places for eighth position and a team silver medal.

In January 2022 at the Valencia Ibercaja, he tied Mo Farah's over 10-year-old British 10 kilometres record with his time of 27:44. The 24-year-old set five other personal bests that year (3000 m, 5000 m, 10,000 m, 5 km, half marathon). At the European Cross Country Championships held in Turin, Italy in December, Cairess achieved his best performance up to that point, with silver medal in the men's senior race behind only reigning world 5000 m champion and European record holder in the event Jakob Ingebrigtsen.

On 4 March 2023, Cairess broke Richard Nerurkar's 30-year European 10-mile record (46:02) with a time of 45:57 at the 'Breaking 10' in Barrowford. Later that year, he finished sixth on debut in the London Marathon in a time of 02:08:07.

On 21 April 2024, Cairess finished third in the London Marathon, qualifying for the 2024 Olympic Games in Paris, where he finished fourth.

In 2025, Cairess became the British 10,000 metres champion as the highest ranked Briton at the 2025 UK Athletics Championships.

== Statistics ==
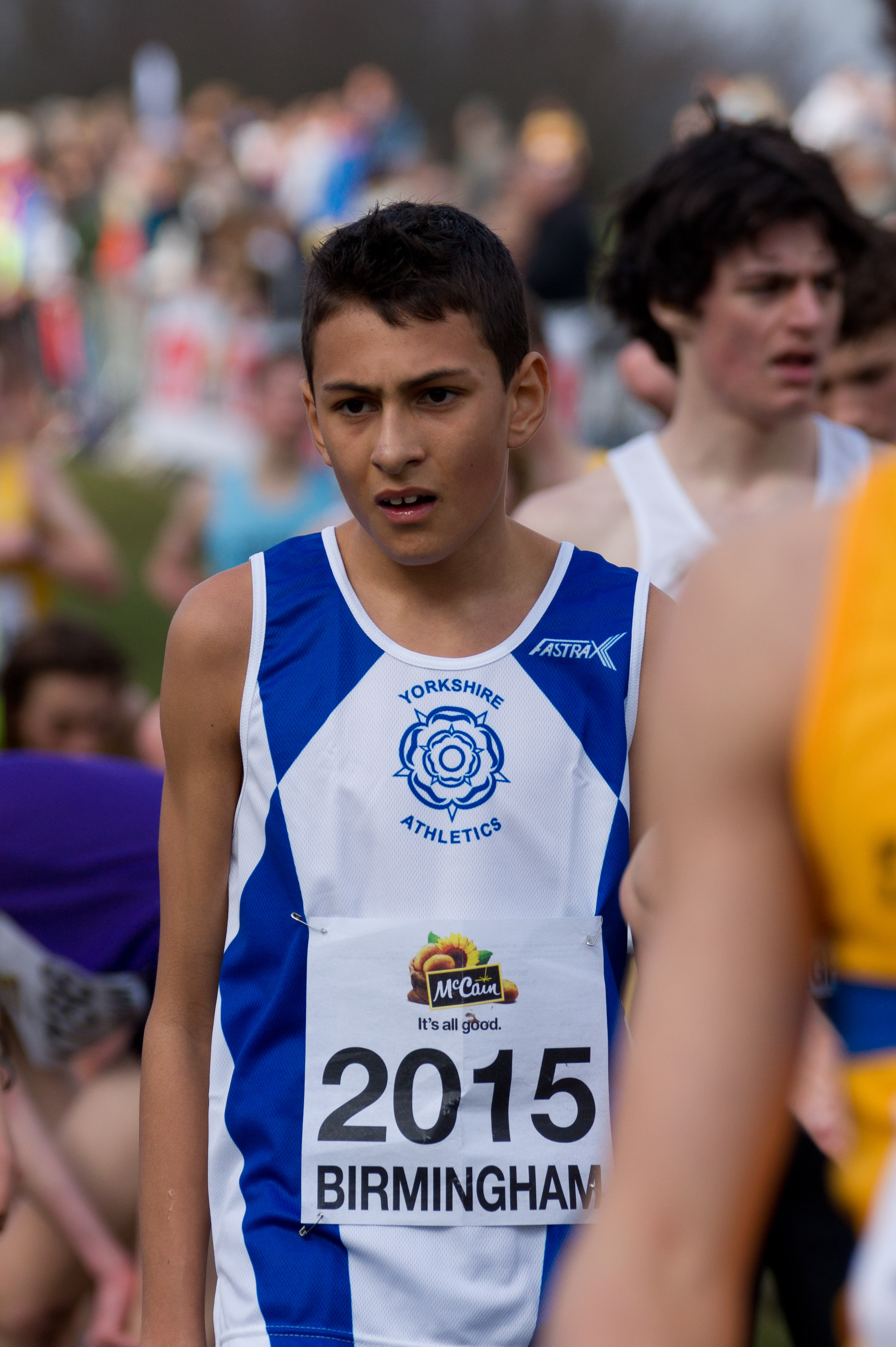
Cairess at age 14 at the Inter-counties Cross Country (2012).

=== International competitions ===
Representing Great Britain / England
Year	Competition	Venue	Position	Event	Result
2018	European Cross Country Championships	Tilburg, Netherlands	8th	XC 8.3 km U23	24:07
2018	European Cross Country Championships	Tilburg, Netherlands	2nd	U23 team	30 pts
2019	European U23 Championships	Gävle, Sweden	3rd	10,000 m	28:50.21
2019	European Cross Country Championships	Lisbon, Portugal	60th	XC 8.3 km U23	26:34
2021	European 10,000m Cup	Birmingham, United Kingdom	10th	10000 m	27:53.19 PB
2021	European 10,000m Cup	Birmingham, United Kingdom	2nd	Team	1:23:33.77
2022	European Championships	Munich, Germany	11th	10,000 m	28:07.37
2022	European Cross Country Championships	Turin, Italy	2nd	XC 9.572 km	29:42
2022	European Cross Country Championships	Turin, Italy	6th	Team	46 pts
2024	Olympic Games	Paris, France	4th	Marathon	2:07:29
2025	World Championships	Tokyo, Japan	–	Marathon	DNF

=== Personal bests ===
- 3000 metres – 7:44.74 (Nembro 2022)
  - 3000 metres indoor – 7:59.45 (Manchester 2021)
- 5000 metres – 13:26.40 (Heusden-Zolder 2022)
- 10,000 metres – 27:34.08 (London 2022)

Road

- 5 kilometres – 13:38 (Herzogenaurach 2022)
- 10 kilometres – 27:44 (Valencia 2022)
- 10 miles – 45:57 (Barrowford 2023)
- Half marathon – 1:00:01 (Naples 2024)
- Marathon – 2:06:46 (London 2024)
