= 2024 European Athletics Championships – Men's 10,000 metres =

Men's 10,000 metres at the 2024 European Athletics Championships
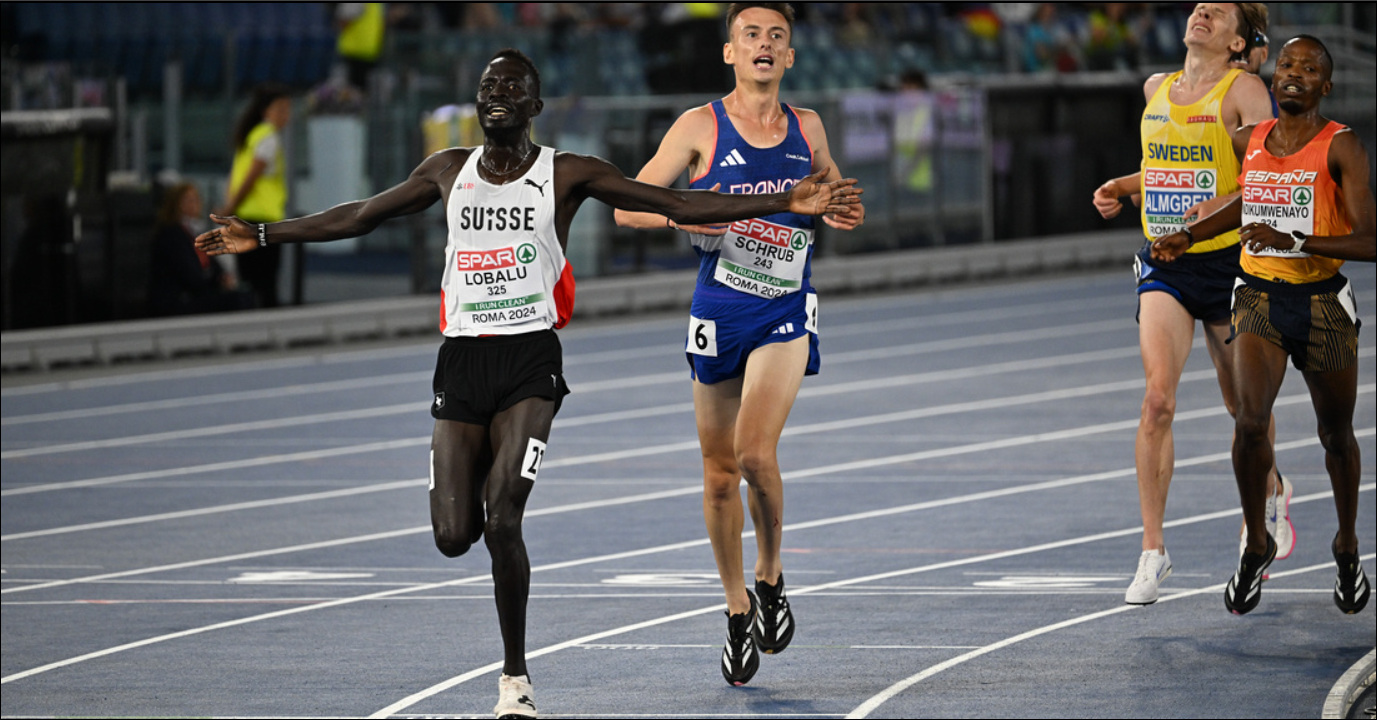
- Venue: Stadio Olimpico
- Location: Rome
- Dates: 12 June (final)
- Competitors: 46 from 16 nations
- Winning time: 28:00.32

The men's 10,000 metres at the 2024 European Athletics Championships took place at the Stadio Olimpico on 12 June.

== Records ==
Standing records prior to the 2024 European Athletics Championships
| World record | Joshua Cheptegei (UGA) | 26:11.00 | Valencia, Spain | 7 October 2020 |
| European record | Mo Farah (GBR) | 26:46.57 | Eugene, Oregon, United States | 3 June 2011 |
| Championship record | Martti Vainio (FIN) | 27:30.99 | Prague, Czechoslovakia | 29 August 1978 |
| World Leading | Daniel Mateiko (KEN) | 26:50.81 | Eugene, Oregon, United States | 25 May 2024 |
| Europe Leading | Andreas Almgren (SWE) | 26:52.87 | San Juan Capistrano, California, United States | 16 March 2024 |

== Schedule ==
| Date | Time | Round |
|---|---|---|
| 12 June 2024 | 20:12 | Final B |
| 12 June 2024 | 21:44 | Final A |

All times are local times (UTC+2)

== Results ==
| Rank | Heat | Name | Nationality | Time | Note |
|---|---|---|---|---|---|
| 1st place, gold medalist(s) | A | Dominic Lokinyomo Lobalu | Switzerland | 28:00.32 | |
| 2nd place, silver medalist(s) | A | Yann Schrub | France | 28:00.48 | SB |
| 3rd place, bronze medalist(s) | A | Thierry Ndikumwenayo | Spain | 28:00.96 | |
| 4 | A | Andreas Almgren | Sweden | 28:01.16 | |
| 5 | A | Jimmy Gressier | France | 28:01.42 | SB |
| 6 | A | Patrick Dever | Great Britain | 28:04.43 | |
| 7 | A | Tadesse Getahon | Israel | 28:09.87 | |
| 8 | A | Abdessamad Oukhelfen | Spain | 28:10.97 | |
| 9 | A | Simon Bedard | France | 28:11.61 | |
| 10 | A | Valentin Gondouin | France | 28:11.86 | |
| 11 | A | Ilias Fifa | Spain | 28:14.10 | |
| 12 | A | Efrem Gidey | Ireland | 28:16.94 | |
| 13 | A | Jonas Raess | Switzerland | 28:17.79 | |
| 14 | A | Isaac Kimeli | Belgium | 28:17.84 | |
| 15 | A | Davor Aaron Bienenfeld | Germany | 28:18.19 | |
| 16 | A | Nils Voigt | Germany | 28:21.28 | |
| 17 | B | Jesús Ramos | Spain | 28:24.93 | |
| 18 | A | Zakariya Mahamed | Great Britain | 28:25.31 | |
| 19 | B | Eduardo Menacho | Spain | 28:25.62 | |
| 20 | B | Oliver Löfqvist | Sweden | 28:28.42 | |
| 21 | A | Noah Schutte | Netherlands | 28:28.52 | |
| 22 | B | Dereje Chekole | Israel | 28:30.93 | |
| 23 | B | Francesco Guerra | Italy | 28:31.15 | |
| 24 | B | Ahmed Ouhda | Italy | 28:33.50 | |
| 25 | A | Rory Leonard | Great Britain | 28:33.66 | |
| 26 | B | Simon Sundström | Sweden | 28:33.93 | |
| 27 | A | Brian Fay | Great Britain | 28:40.53 | |
| 28 | B | Tom Förster | Germany | 28:41.95 | |
| 29 | B | Adisu Guadia | Israel | 28:42.39 | |
| 30 | B | Luca Ursano | Italy | 28:47.63 | |
| 31 | A | Barry Keane | Great Britain | 28:53.34 | |
| 32 | A | Peter Lynch | Ireland | 29:02.00 | |
| 33 | A | Yitayew Abuhay | Israel | 29:05.32 | |
| 34 | B | Artūrs Niklāvs Medveds | Latvia | 29:09.03 | |
| 35 | A | Cormac Dalton | Ireland | 29:15.30 | SB |
| 36 | A | Bukayawe Malede | Israel | 29:27.90 | |
| 37 | B | Bjørnar Sandnes Lillefosse | Norway | 29:47.03 | SB |
| 38 | B | Mohammadreza Abootorabi | Sweden | 29:55.11 | SB |
| 39 | B | Konstantinos Stamoulis | Greece | 30:09.67 | |
| 40 | B | Nikolaos Stamoulis | Greece | 30:42.47 | |
| 41 | B | Mika Kotiranta | Finland | 31:25.10 | |
| 42 | B | Marios Anagnostou | Greece | 31:53.73 | |
| | B | Loic Scomparin | France | DNF | |
| | A | Yemaneberhan Crippa | Italy | DNS | |
| | A | Pietro Riva | Italy | DNS | |
| | A | Samuel Barata | Portugal | DNS | |
