= Jimmy Gressier =

French long-distance runner (born 1997)

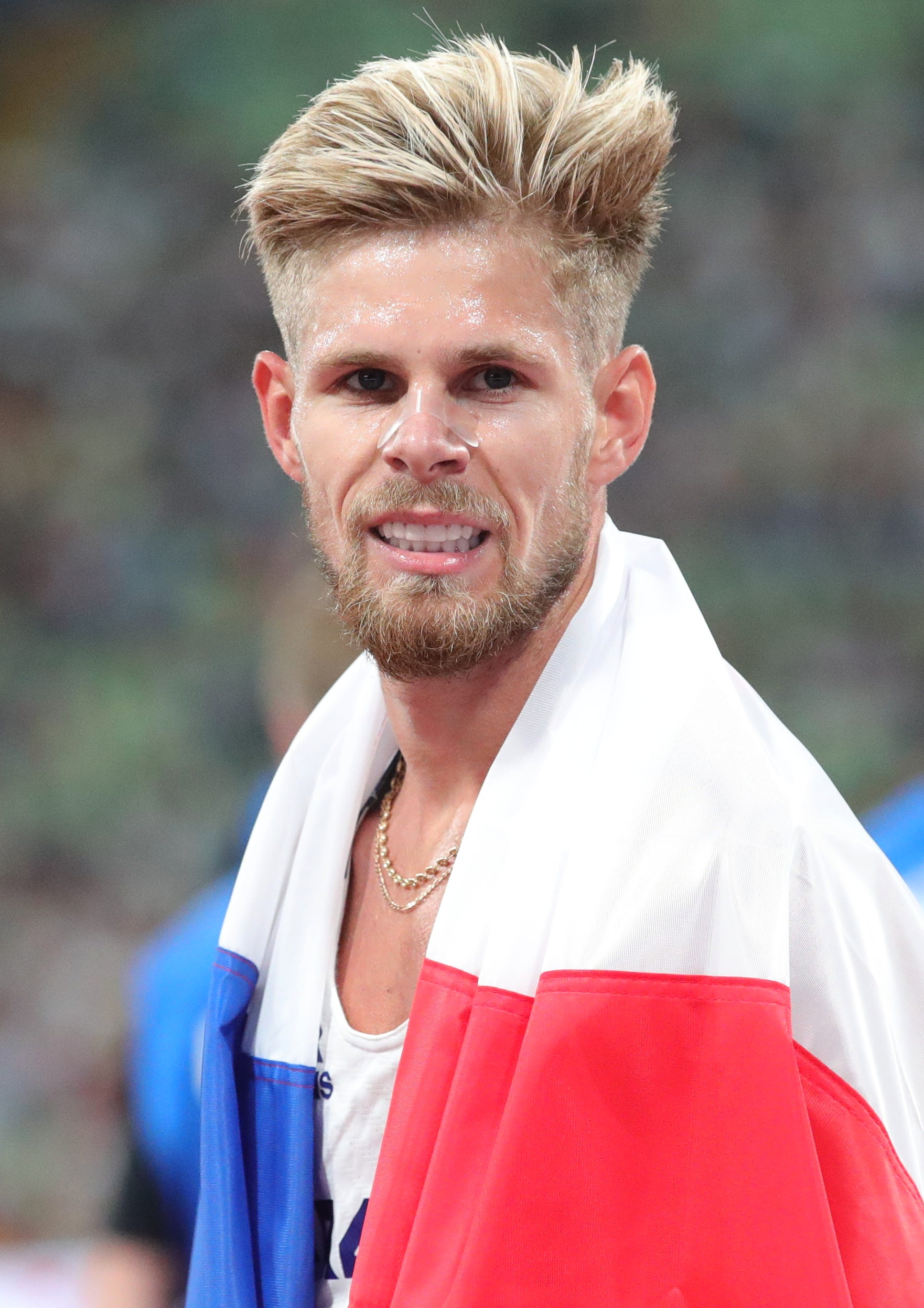
- Gressier at the 2022 European Athletics Championships

Personal information
- Born: 4 May 1997 (age 29) Boulogne-sur-Mer, France
- Height: 1.75 m (5 ft 9 in)
- Weight: 62 kg (137 lb)

Sport
- Country: France
- Sport: Athletics
- Events: Middle-, Long-distance running
- Club: Boulogne AC
- Coached by: Dinielle Arnaud (2015–)
Medal record
Athletics
Representing France
World Championships
Gold medal – first place	2025 Tokyo	10,000 m
Bronze medal – third place	2025 Tokyo	5000 m
European Championships
Bronze medal – third place	2026 Birmingham	10,000 m
Diamond League
First place	2025 Zürich	3000 m (Note: 3000 m was the event only in the final, others 2025 meetings included 5000 m events)
European Running Championships
Gold medal – first place	2025 Brussels	Half marathon
European U23 Championships
Gold medal – first place	2019 Gävle	5000 m
Gold medal – first place	2019 Gävle	10,000 m
European Cross Country Championships
Gold medal – first place	2017 Šamorín	U23 Race
Gold medal – first place	2018 Tilburg	U23 Race
Gold medal – first place	2019 Lisbon	U23 Race
Silver medal – second place	2025 Lagoa	Senior Men
Bronze medal – third place	2021 Dublin	Senior Race

Jimmy Gressier (born 4 May 1997) is a French middle- and long-distance runner. He won gold in the 10,000 metres and bronze in the 5000 metres at the 2025 World Athletics Championships. He has also won gold medals in the 5000 metres and 10,000 metres at the 2019 European Under-23 Championships. Gressier claimed four individual medals at the European Cross Country Championships, including three U23 titles. He is the European record holder for the 5 km road race. He won the 3000 metres at the 2025 Diamond League Final.

== Career ==
Competing in cross country running, Gressier was part of France's gold medal-winning team in the U20 race at the European Cross Country Championships in 2015 and 2016. Gressier won the gold medal at the 2017 European Cross Country Championships in Šamorín in the U23 race. Gressier won the gold medal again at the 2018 European Cross Country Championships in Tilburg in the U23 race.

Competing at the 2019 European Athletics U23 Championships, Gressier won the gold medal in the 5000 m in Gävle, also winning the gold medal in the 10,000 m at the championships. Later that year, Gressier ran the Corrida de Houilles, a road race in Paris over 10 km in a European-leading time of 27:43 to move to second on the European all-time list behind only Julien Wanders of Switzerland. Gressier also won the gold medal at the 2019 European Cross Country Championships in Lisbon in the U23 race, for the third consecutive year.

Gressier represented France at the delayed 2020 Summer Olympics, held in Tokyo in 2021, in the men's 5000 metres, qualifying for the final and placing 13th overall. Stepping up to the seniors after his under-23 victories, he was a bronze medalist at the 2021 European Cross Country Championships in Dublin, Ireland, finishing behind Jakob Ingebrigtsen and Aras Kaya of Turkey.

Gressier placed eleventh at the 2022 World Athletics Championships over 10,000 metres in Eugene, Oregon, and fourth over that distance at the 2022 European Athletics Championships in Munich, Germany.

=== 2023: European 5 km road record ===
Gressier held the European 5 km road race record of 13:18 from February 2020 until April 2022, when Italy's Yemaneberhan Crippa set a new continental best mark of 13:14. On 12 February 2023, Gressier regained his record at the Monaco Run – 5 km Herculis with a time of 13:12.

That year, he had a top-ten finish in the final of the 5000 metres at the 2023 World Athletics Championships in Budapest, and a top-five finish at the 2023 World Athletics Road Running Championships in the half marathon in Riga, Latvia.

Gressier placed fifth over 10,000 metres at the 2024 European Athletics Championships in Rome, Italy. Competing at the 2024 Olympic Games, he was eliminated in the heats over 5000 metres, and placed thirteenth in the 10,000 metres.

=== 2025: 10,000 m world champion ===
In February 2025, Gressier set a new European indoor record over 5000 metres of 12:54.92 at the BU David Hemery Valentine International in Boston, Massachusetts, finishing behind a world-record setting Grant Fisher. Competing in the half marathon, Gressier won the gold medal at the 2025 European Running Championships in Brussels in April 2025, running a personal best time of 59:45 to win ahead of Awet Nftalem Kibrab. It was his first senior-level title.

In August, Gressier won the 2025 Diamond League final in Zurich over 3000 metres. At the 2025 World Athletics Championships held in Tokyo, Gressier was the surprise winner of the 10,000 m. Gressier won with a late burst of speed in the finishing straight, coming in with a time of 28 minutes 55.77 seconds. He is the first Frenchman and the third European male to have won at this distance in the world championship, and only the second male champion not to be born in Africa after Alberto Cova in 1983. On the final day of the World Championships, Gressier added a bronze medal to his haul after finishing third in the 5000 m race.

Gressier won the silver medal at the 2025 European Cross Country Championships in Lagoa, Portugal, behind Thierry Ndikumwenayo of Spain.

Gressier improved his own European 5 km record to 12:51, missing the world record by just two seconds, at the Urban Trail de Lille in France on 4 April 2026. On 17 June, Gressier broke the French 3000m record at the Meeting de Montreuil, with 7:28.67, also moving into the European all-time top-10 list.

He won the bronze medal at 10.000 meters at the 2026 European Championship in Birmingham.

== Miscellaneous ==
Gressier is known for race finish celebrations. At the 2018 edition of the European cross country while in first place at the end of the U23 race he attempted a football player like knee slide but ended up falling flat on his face as he crossed the line. At the 2019 edition of the same race Gressier was so far clear of the other competitors that he walked across the line. At the 2019 French Cross Country Championships, Gressier began slapping hands with the crowd and high-fived a mascot before looking back to discover that he wasn't leading as big a margin as he thought and had to sprint for the finish. At the French Cross Country Championships in March 2023, he celebrated by eating a crepe before the finish line. He attempted, unsuccessfully, to feed some of his victory crepe to second-place finisher Markus Georger, who declined. He then offered some to third-place Fabien Palcau, who happily accepted. He celebrated his victory in the half marathon at the 2025 European Running Championships in April 2025, by hurdling over the victory tape.

== Personal life ==
He lived in Boulogne-sur-Mer in Northern France and played football as well as competing in athletics as a teenager. In 2015, Gressier was selected to play for a football team representing France at the World Schools Football Cup in Guatemala, as well as being selected for the Junior Cross-Country World Championships in China. However, it became difficult to pursue both and he stopped football at the age of 17.

== Achievements ==
=== International competitions ===
Year	Competition	Venue	Position	Event	Result
2015	World Cross Country Championships	Guiyang, China	80th	Junior race	27:10
2015	European Cross Country Championships	Hyères, France	4th	Junior race	17:48
2015	European Cross Country Championships	Hyères, France	1st	Junior team	27 pts
2016	World U20 Championships	Bydgoszcz, Poland	10th	5000 m	13:55.07
2016	European Cross Country Championships	Chia, Italy	4th	Junior race	17:19
2016	European Cross Country Championships	Chia, Italy	1st	Junior team	26 pts
2017	European U23 Championships	Bydgoszcz, Poland	–	5000 m	DQ
2017	European Cross Country Championships	Šamorín, Slovakia	1st	U23 race	24:35
2017	European Cross Country Championships	Šamorín, Slovakia	1st	U23 team	7 pts
2018	Mediterranean U23 Championships	Jesolo, Italy	1st	5000 m	14:35.85
2018	Mediterranean Games	Tarragona, Spain	8th	5000 m	14:01.13
2018	European Cross Country Championships	Tilburg, Netherlands	1st	U23 race	23:37
2018	European Cross Country Championships	Tilburg, Netherlands	1st	U23 team	11 pts
2019	European Indoor Championships	Glasgow, United Kingdom	7th	3000 m	8:00.89
2019	European U23 Championships	Gävle, Sweden	1st	5000 m	14:16.55
2019	European U23 Championships	Gävle, Sweden	1st	10,000 m	28:44.17
2019	European Cross Country Championships	Lisbon, Portugal	1st	U23 race	24:17
2019	European Cross Country Championships	Lisbon, Portugal	1st	U23 team	17 pts
2021	European Indoor Championships	Toruń, Poland	8th	3000 m	7:52.43
2021	Olympic Games	Tokyo, Japan	13th	5000 m	13:11.33
2021	European Cross Country Championships	Dublin, Ireland	3rd	Senior race	30:34
2021	European Cross Country Championships	Dublin, Ireland	1st	Senior team	13 pts
2022	European 10,000m Cup	Pacé, France	1st	10,000 m	27:24.51
2022	World Championships	Eugene, United States	11th	10,000 m	27:44.55
2022	European Championships	Munich, Germany	4th	10,000 m	27:49.84
2023	World Championships	Budapest, Hungary	9th	5000 m	13:17.20
2024	European Championships	Rome, Italy	5th	10,000 m	28:01.42
2024	Olympic Games	Paris, France	27th (h)	5000 m	14:09.95
2024	Olympic Games	Paris, France	13th	10,000 m	26:58.67
2026	European Running Championships	Leuven, Belgium	1st	Half marathon	59:45
2026	World Championships	Tokyo, Japan	3rd	5000 m	12:59.33
2026	World Championships	Tokyo, Japan	1st	10,000 m	28:55.77
2026	European Championships	Birmingham, United Kingdom	4th	5000 m	13:16.36
2026	European Championships	Birmingham, United Kingdom	3rd	10,000 m	28:07.90
2026	World Road Running Championships	Copenhagen, Denmark	14th	5 km	13:17

=== Personal bests ===
- 800 metres – 1:54.33 (Calais 2017)
- 1000 metres – 2:24.84 (Saint-Pol-sur-Ternoise 2017)
- 1500 metres – 3:32.71 (Heusden-Zolder 2025)
  - 1500 metres indoor – 3:37.41 (Metz 2022)
- 3000 metres – 7:28.67 (Montreuil 2026) NR
  - 3000 metres indoor – 7:30.18 (New York 2025) NR
- 5000 metres – 12:51.59 (Paris 2025) NR
  - 5000 metres indoor - 12:54.92 (Boston 2025) AR
- 10,000 metres – 26:58.67 (Paris 2024) NR
- 3000 m steeplechase – 8:24.72 (Décines 2020)

Road

- 5 kilometres – 12:51 (Lille 2026) AR
- 10 kilometres – 27:07 (Lille 2024)
- Half marathon - 59:45 (Brussels 2025)
