= Andreas Almgren =

Swedish middle-distance runner

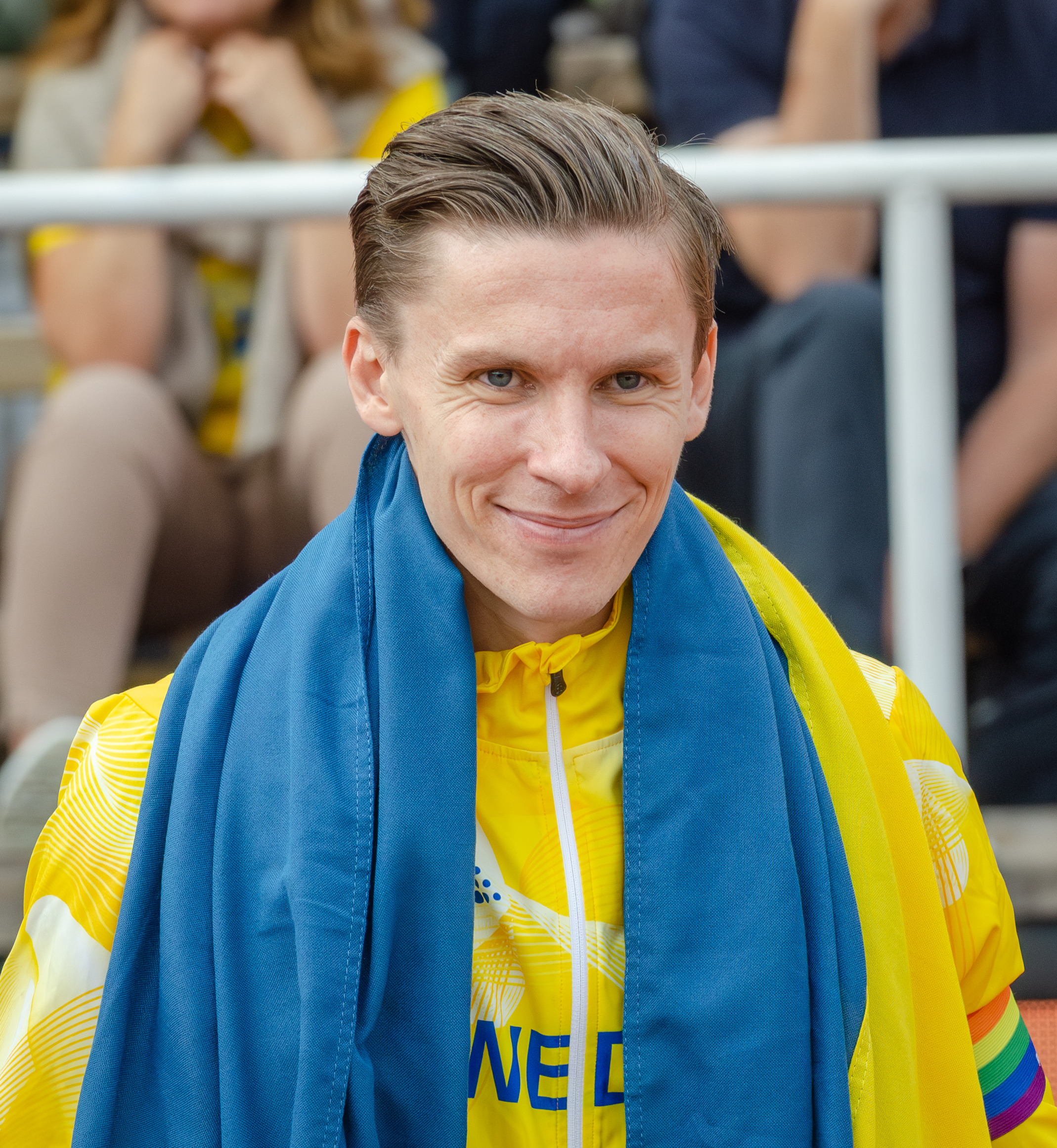
- Andreas Almgren in 2023.

Personal information
- Nationality: Swedish
- Born: 12 June 1995 (age 31)
- Height: 1.77 m (5 ft 10 in)

Sport
- Sport: Running
- Events: Marathon; 800 metres
Medal record
Men's athletics
Representing Sweden
World Championships
Bronze medal – third place	2025 Tokyo	10,000 m
World Road Running Championships
Gold medal – first place	2026 Copenhagen	Half marathon
European Championships
Gold medal – first place	2026 Birmingham	10,000 m
European Games
Silver medal – second place	2023 Kraków-Małopolska	5000 m
World Junior Championships
Bronze medal – third place	2014 Oregon	800 m
World Marathon Majors
Gold medal – first place	2026 New York	Marathon

Andreas Almgren (born 12 June 1995) is a Swedish long-distance runner and former middle-distance runner. In 2026, he won the New York City Marathon on his debut at the distance.

Earlier that year, he won the half marathon at the 2026 World Athletics Road Running Championships in Copenhagen and the 10,000 metres at the 2026 European Athletics Championships in Birmingham, setting championship records in both events.

Almgren also won the bronze medal in the 10,000 metres at the 2025 World Athletics Championships in Tokyo and holds the European records in the 5000 metres and half marathon.

Earlier in his career, Almgren won the bronze medal in the 800 metres at the 2014 World Junior Championships in Athletics in Eugene, Oregon, on 27 July 2014. Almgren qualified for the 5000m race at the 2024 Olympics and traveled to Paris to compete, but was forced to withdraw due to a lingering shinbone injury.

Outside athletics, Almgren has worked as a data scientist for the sports technology company Svexa.

== Achievements ==
Year	Competition	Venue	Position	Event	Notes
2011	World Youth Championships	Lille, France	19th (sf)	800 m	1:52.26
2014	World Junior Championships	Eugene, US	3rd	800 m	1:45.65 NJR
2014	European Championships	Zürich, Switzerland	10th (sf)	800 m	1:47.55
2015	European Indoor Championships	Prague, Czech Republic	4th	800 m	1:47.78
2015	World Championships	Beijing, China	25th (h)	800 m	1:48.06
2022	European Championships	Munich, Germany	4th	5000 m	13:26.48
2023	World Championships	Budapest, Hungary	20th (h)	5000 m	13:36.57
2024	European Championships	Rome, Italy	4th	10,000 m	28:01.16
2025	European Indoor Championships	Apeldoorn, Netherlands	4th	3000 m	7:50.66
2025	World Championships	Tokyo, Japan	9th (h)	5000 m	13:16.38
2025	World Championships	Tokyo, Japan	3rd	10,000 m	28:56.02
2026	European Championships	Birmingham	1st	10,000 m	27:23.44
2026	World Road Running Championships	Copenhagen, Denmark	1st	Half marathon	58:06
2026	New York City Marathon	New York, US	1st	Marathon	2:06:01

== Personal bests ==
Outdoor

- 800 metres – 1:45.59 (Sollentuna 2015)
- 1500 metres – 3:32.00 (Oslo 2023)
- 3000 metres – 7:26.48 (Shaoxing 2026) NR
- 5000 metres – 12:44.27 (Stockholm 2025) ER
- 10,000 metres – 26:52.87 (San Juan Capistrano 2024) NR
- 10 km road - 26:45 (Valencia 2026) NR, ER
- Half marathon - 58:06 (Copenhagen 2026) NR, ER
- Marathon - 2:06:01 (New York 2026)

Indoor

- 800 metres – 1:46.56 (Stockholm 2015)
- 3000 metres – 7:34.31 (Liévin 2022) NR
