= Tadesse Getahon =

Israeli long-distance runner

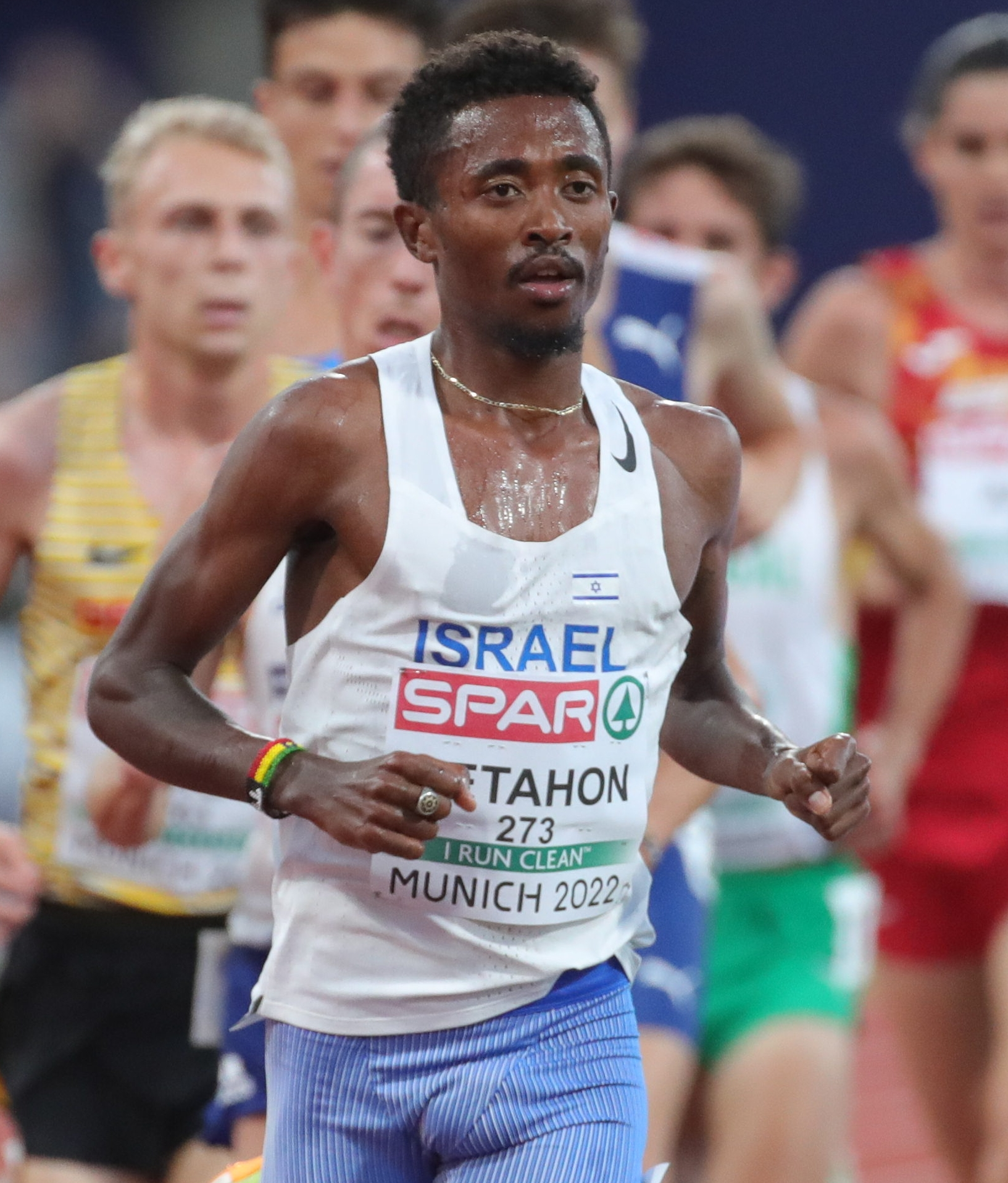
- Getahon in 2022

Personal information
- Native name: טדסה גטהון
- Born: 20 December 1997 (age 28)

Sport
- Country: Israel
- Sport: Athletics
- Event: Long-distance running
Medal record
Men's athletics
Representing Israel
European Championships
Gold medal – first place	2026 Birmingham	Marathon team

Tadesse Getahon (Hebrew: טדסה גטהון; born 20 December 1997) is an Israeli long-distance runner.

== Career ==
In 2017, he competed in the men's 10,000 metres event at the European Athletics U23 Championships held in Bydgoszcz, Poland.

Two years later, in 2019, he won the silver medal in the men's 10,000 metres event at the European Athletics U23 Championships held in Gävle, Sweden. He also finished in 4th place in the men's 5000 metres event.

In 2020, he competed in the men's race at the World Athletics Half Marathon Championships held in Gdynia, Poland.

In 2022 he was banned for Anti-Doping Rule Violation by Israel National Anti-Doping Organization

== Achievements ==
Year	Competition	Venue	Position	Event	Notes
Representing Israel
2020	World Championships (HM)	Gdynia, Poland	25th	Half marathon	1:00:52
2022	European Championships	Munich, Germany	10th	10,000 m	28:04.37
2024	European Championships	Rome, Italy	7th	10,000 m	28:09.87
2026	European Championships	Birmingham, United Kingdom	5th	Marathon	2:09:31
