= Nils Voigt =

German long-distance runner

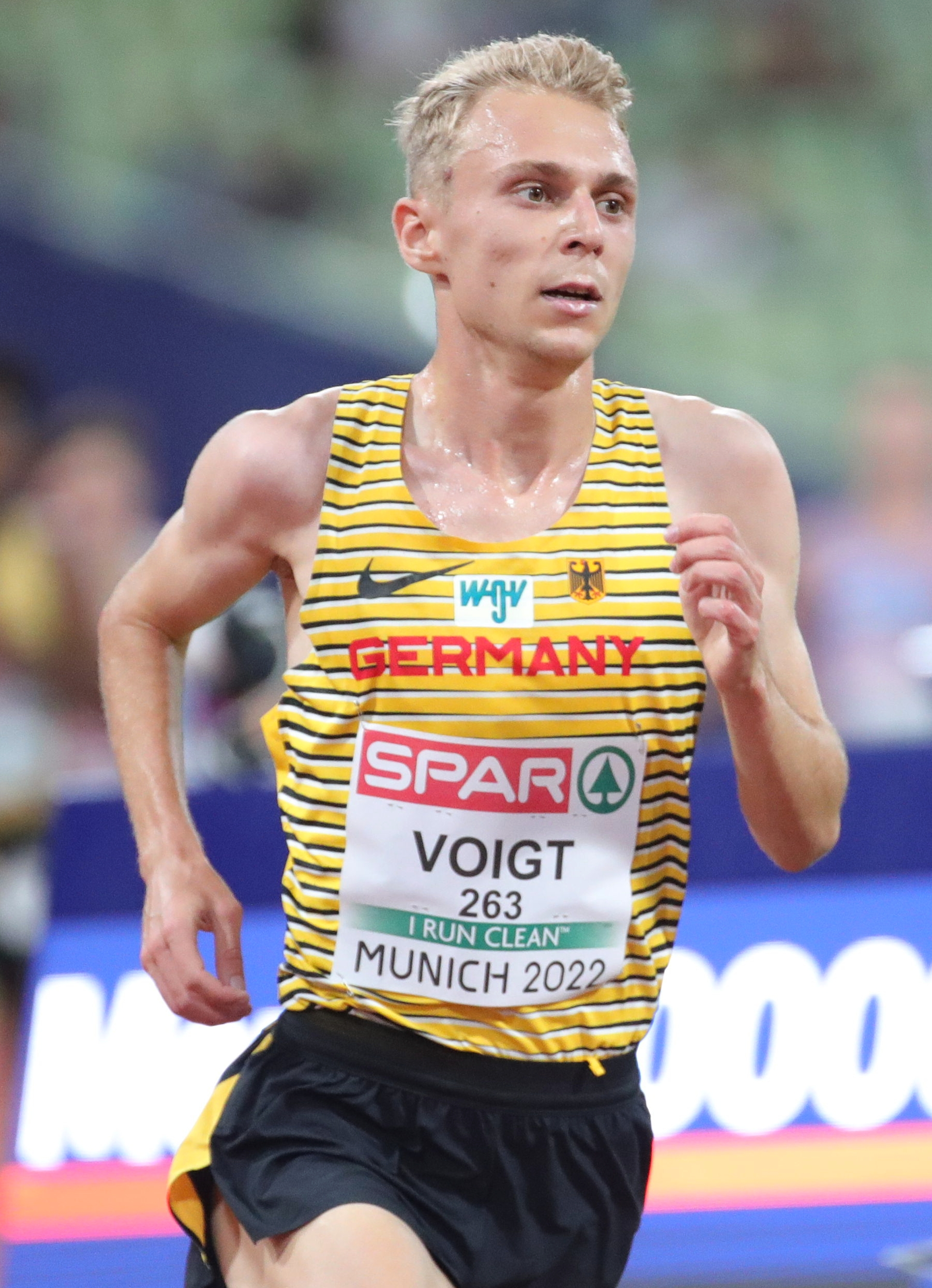
- Voigt at the 2022 European Athletics Championships

Personal information
- Nationality: German
- Born: 2 May 1997 (age 29) Münster, Germany

Sport
- Sport: Track
- Event: 3000 metres – Half marathon
- Club: TV Wattenscheid
- Coached by: Anton Kirschbaum

Nils Voigt (born 2 May 1997) is a German long-distance runner. He is a four-time German national champion. He also placed 21st in the 10,000 metres at the 2023 World Athletics Championships and 8th in the 10,000 metres at the 2022 European Athletics Championships.

== Achievements ==
Information from World Athletics unless otherwise noted.

=== International competitions ===
Representing Germany
Year	Competition	Venue	Position	Event	Time	Notes
2022	European Championships	Munich, Germany	8th	10,000 m	28:02.19	
2023	World Championships	Budapest, Hungary	21st	10,000 m	29:06.79	
2024	European Championships	Rome, Italy	16th	10,000 m	28:21.28	
2025	European Running Championships	Leuven, Belgium	6th	10 km	28:08	

=== Personal bests ===
Outdoor

- 3000 metres – 7:51.07 (Trier 2022)
- 5000 metres – 13:31.20 (Heusden-Zolder 2022)
- 10,000 metres – 27:30.01 (San Juan Capistrano 2023)

Indoor

- 3000 metres – 7:51.30 (Istanbul 2023)

Road

- 10K – 28:03 (Houilles 2022)
- 15K – 43:18 (Nijmegen 2022)
- Half marathon – 1:01:35 (Dresden 2021)

=== National titles ===
- German Athletics Championships
  - 10,000 metres: 2021, 2023
  - 10K (road): 2021
- German Indoor Athletics Championships
  - 3000 metres: 2023
