= Abdessamad Oukhelfen =

Spanish long-distance runner (born 1998)

Personal information
- Full name: Abdessamad Oukhelfen Ben Haddou
- Nationality: Spanish
- Born: 18 December 1998 (age 27) Ksar Iminouzrou, Morocco

Sport
- Country: Spain
- Sport: Athletics
- Event(s): Middle-, Long-distance running
- Club: CD Nike Running
Medal record
Men's athletics
Representing Spain
European U23 Championships
Bronze medal – third place	2019 Gävle	5000 m
European Cross Country Championships
Gold medal – first place	2024 Antalya	Team race
Silver medal – second place	2021 Dublin	Senior team
Bronze medal – third place	2019 Lisbon	U23 Race
Bronze medal – third place	2022 Turin	Senior team

Abdessamad Oukhelfen Ben Haddou (born 18 December 1998) is a middle- and long-distance runner. Born in Morocco, he represents Spain internationally. He won bronze medals in the 5000 metres at the 2019 European Under-23 Championships and for the U23 race at the 2019 European Cross Country Championships.

Oukhelfen was the 5000 m 2020 Spanish national champion.

In 2021, he won the Cross Internacional de la Constitución 10.06 km cross-country race held in Alcobendas, Spain.

== Personal bests ==
- 1500 metres – 3:40.45 (Barcelona 2022)
- 3000 metres – 7:45.24 (Barcelona 2020)
  - 3000 metres indoor – 7:55.26 (Metz 2021)
- 5000 metres – 13:17.95 (Ostrava 2020)
- 10,000 metres – 28:30.03 (Burjassot 2019)

Road

- 5 kilometres – 13:37 (Barcelona 2022)
- 10 kilometres – 27:44 (Valencia 2024)
