= Belgium at the 2026 European Athletics Championships =

- WA code: BEL
- National federation: Royal Belgian Athletics League
- Website: www.belgian-athletics.be

in Birmingham, United Kingdom
- Competitors: 61 (33 men and 28 women)
- Medals Ranked 20th: Gold 0 Silver 1 Bronze 3 Total 4

European Athletics Championships appearances (overview)
- 1934; 1938; 1946; 1950; 1954; 1958; 1962; 1966; 1969; 1971; 1974; 1978; 1982; 1986; 1990; 1994; 1998; 2002; 2006; 2010; 2012; 2014; 2016; 2018; 2022; 2024; 2026

Belgium competed at the 2026 European Athletics Championships in Birmingham, United Kingdom, between 10 and 16 August 2026. A delegation of 59 athletes (48 individual athletes and 6 relay teams) was sent to represent the country.

== Medals ==
Medal	Name	Event	Date
Silver	Saliyya Guisse	Women's triple jump	13 August
Bronze	Delphine Nkansa	Women's 100 m	10 August
Bronze	Jana Van Lent	Women's 10,000 m	14 August
Bronze	Emiel Botterman; Ibrahim Camara; Antoine Snyders; Simon Verherstraeten	Men's 4 × 100 m relay	15 August

== Results ==
The following athletes were selected to compete by Belgian Athletics.

- including alternates

Key

- Note–Ranks given for track events are within the athlete's heat only
- Q = Qualified by place in Track Events or by standard in Field Events
- q = Qualified by time in Track Events or without standard in Field Events
- qR= Advanced to the next round by referee.
- NR = National record
- CHB = Championship best
- WL = World Leading
- PB = Personal best
- SB = Season's best
- — = Round not applicable for the event
- Bye = Athlete not required to compete in round
- DNF = Did Not Finish (Running or Race Walking Events)
- DNS = Did not start
- DQ = Disqualified
- NM = No Mark (No valid trial recorded in Field Events

Men
Track and road events

Athlete	Event	Heat		Semifinal		Final	
Athlete	Event	Result	Rank	Result	Rank	Result	Rank
Emiel Botterman	100 metres	10.42	1 q	10.45	5	Did not qualify	
Antoine Snyders	100 metres	10.61	5	Did not qualify			
Simon Verherstraeten	100 metres	10.39	2 q	10.27	3 q	13.12	8
Antoine Snyders	200 metres	Bye		20.65	5	Did not qualify	
Dylan Borlée	400 metres	46.17	17	Did not qualify			
Jonathan Sacoor	400 metres	45.60	5 q	46.14	8	Did not qualify	
Daniel Segers	400 metres	Bye		45.03	3 q	45.48	8
Eliott Crestan	800 metres	DNS					
Pieter Sisk	1500 metres	3:44.67	13	—N/a		Did not advance	
Ruben Verheyden	1500 metres	3:38.19	9	—N/a		Did not advance	
Jochem Vermeulen	1500 metres	3:43.41	12	—N/a		Did not advance	
Isaac Kimeli	5000 metres	—N/a				13:23.17	9
Isaac Kimeli	10,000 metres	—N/a				DNF	
Simon Debognies	10,000 metres	—N/a				28:25.55	11
Vincent Bierinckx	Marathon	—N/a				2:15:32 SB	25
Nathan Sevenois	Marathon	—N/a				2:16:34 SB	29
Yohan Zaradzki	Marathon	—N/a				2:18:58	38
Elie Bacari	110 metres hurdles	Bye		DNF		Did not qualify	
Zeno Van Neygen	110 metres hurdles	13.54 SB	2 q	13.41 PB	3	Did not qualify	
Julien Watrin	400 metres hurdles	49.24	1 q	49.39	5	Did not qualify	
Rémi Schyns	3000 metres steeplechase	8:34.63	2 Q	—N/a		8:29.25	7
Tim Van de Velde	3000 metres steeplechase	8:59.67	15	—N/a		Did not qualify	
Emiel Botterman; Ibrahim Camara; Amine Kasmi; Antoine Snyders; Simon Verherstraeten; Cedric Verschueren	4 × 100 metres relay	38.84	3 Q	—N/a		38.70	3rd place, bronze medalist(s)
Dylan Borlée; Jonathan Sacoor; Daniel Segers; Julien Watrin	4 × 400 metres relay	2:59.35 SB	2 Q	—N/a		2:59.51	4

Field events

Athlete	Event	Qualification		Final	
Athlete	Event	Distance	Position	Distance	Position
Thomas Carmoy	High Jump	2.23 SB	10 q	2.18	=8
Jef Vermeiren	High Jump	2.10	23	Did not qualify	
Ben Broeders	Pole vault	5.60	10 q	5.70	8
Ylio Philtjens	Pole vault	5.60	1 q	5.70 =PB	10
Yanni Sampson	Long jump	7.97	10 q	7.59	11
Timothy Herman	Javelin throw	75.65	24	Did not advance	

Combined events – Decathlon

Athlete	Event	100 m	LJ	SP	HJ	400 m	110H	DT	PV	JT	1500 m	Final	Rank
Dai Keïta	Result	10.90	7.33	12.77	1.96	47.97 PB	14.84	39.04	5.00	53.36	4:35.49	7878	15
Dai Keïta	Points	883	893	653	767	911	869	645	910	638	709	7878	15

Women
Track and road events

Athlete	Event	Heat		Semifinal		Final	
Athlete	Event	Result	Rank	Result	Rank	Result	Rank
Delphine Nkansa	100 metres	11.07 PB	3 q	11.09	2 Q	11.06 PB	3rd place, bronze medalist(s)
Rani Rosius	100 metres	11.17	5 q	11.24	4	Did not qualify	
Delphine Nkansa	200 metres	23.41	4	Did not qualify			
Helena Ponette	400 metres	51.56	1 q	50.31 PB	4 q	51.43	7
Camille Laus	800 metres	1:59.43 PB	7	Did not qualify			
Mariska Parewyck	800 metres	2:01.40	8	Did not qualify			
Elise Vanderelst	5000 metres	—N/a				16:08.70 SB	21
Chloé Herbiet	10,000 metres	—N/a				32:11.71 SB	11
Lisa Rooms	10,000 metres	—N/a				32:10.22 PB	10
Jana Van Lent	10,000 metres	—N/a				31:47.81	3rd place, bronze medalist(s)
Malejeva Mathijs	Marathon	—N/a				2:57:37	47
Victoria Mathy	Marathon	—N/a				2:37:32 PB	28
Valentine Warpy	Marathon	—N/a				2:37:23	27
Yanla Ndjip-Nyemeck	100 metres hurdles	12.87	4 q	12.83	2 Q	12.97	7
Paulien Couckuyt	400 metres hurdles	Bye		53.87 PB	1 Q	53.87 =PB	4
Janie De Naeyer; Delphine Nkansa; Rani Rosius; Rani Vincke	4 × 100 metres relay	42.98 SB	4 q	—N/a		43.31	5
Paulien Couckuyt; Ilana Hanssens; Kylie Lambert; Camille Laus; Helena Ponette	4 × 400 metres relay	3:26.59 SB	4 q	—N/a		3.25.19 PB	6

Field events

Athlete	Event	Qualification		Final	
Athlete	Event	Distance	Position	Distance	Position
Merel Maes	High jump	1.91 SB	=9 Q	1.83	=13
Elien Vekemans	Pole vault	4.50	5 q	4.60 SB	=4
Saliyya Guisse	Triple jump	14.07 PB	10 q	14.46	2nd place, silver medalist(s)
Ilona Masson	Triple jump	14.35	3 Q	14.37	4

Combined events – Heptathlon

Athlete	Event	100H	HJ	SP	200 m	LJ	JT	800 m	Final	Rank
Noor Vidts	Result	13.38	1.77 SB	14.25	24.14 SB	6.22 SB	40.33	2:14.01	6286	11
Noor Vidts	Points	1068	941	811	967	918	674	907	6286	11

Mixed
Track and road events

Athlete	Event	Heat		Semifinal		Final	
Athlete	Event	Result	Rank	Result	Rank	Result	Rank
Ibrahim Camara; Janie De Naeyer; Cédric Verschueren; Rani Vincke	4 × 100 metres relay	—N/a				DQ	
Robin Vanderbemden; Ilana Hanssens; Florent Mabille; Kylie Lambert	4 × 400 metres relay	—N/a				3:17.92	8

== See also ==
- Belgian men's 4 × 400 metres relay team
