= Belgium at the 2024 European Athletics Championships =

- WA code: BEL
- National federation: Royal Belgian Athletics League
- Website: www.belgian-athletics.be

in Rome
- Medals Ranked 7th: Gold 3 Silver 1 Bronze 2 Total 6

European Athletics Championships appearances (overview)
- 1934; 1938; 1946; 1950; 1954; 1958; 1962; 1966; 1969; 1971; 1974; 1978; 1982; 1986; 1990; 1994; 1998; 2002; 2006; 2010; 2012; 2014; 2016; 2018; 2022; 2024; 2026

Belgium competed at the 2024 European Athletics Championships in Rome, Italy, between 7 and 12 June 2024. A delegation of 59 athletes (41 individual athletes and 5 relay teams) was sent to represent the country.

== Medals ==
Medal	Name	Event	Date
Gold	Nafissatou Thiam	Women's heptathlon	8 June
Gold	Alexander Doom	Men's 400 m	10 June
Gold	Dylan Borlée; Alexander Doom; Christian Iguacel; Florent Mabille; Jonathan Sacoor; Robin Vanderbemden	Men's 4 × 400 m relay	12 June
Silver	Jochem Vermeulen	Men's 1500 m	12 June
Bronze	Noor Vidts	Women's heptathlon	8 June
Bronze	Cynthia Bolingo; Camille Laus; Helena Ponette; Naomi Van den Broeck; Imke Vervaet	Women's 4 × 400 m relay	12 June

== Results ==
The following athletes were selected to compete by the Royal Belgian Athletics Federation.

- including alternates

Key

- Note–Ranks given for track events are within the athlete's heat only
- Q = Qualified by place in Track Events or by standard in Field Events
- q = Qualified by time in Track Events or without standard in Field Events
- qR= Advanced to the next round by referee.
- NR = National record
- CHB = Championship best
- WL = World Leading
- PB = Personal best
- SB = Season's best
- — = Round not applicable for the event
- Bye = Athlete not required to compete in round
- DNF = Did Not Finish (Running or Race Walking Events)
- DNS = Did not start
- DQ = Disqualified
- NM = No Mark (No valid trial recorded in Field Events

Men
Track and road events

Athlete	Event	Heat		Semifinal		Final	
Athlete	Event	Result	Rank	Result	Rank	Result	Rank
Dylan Borlée	400 metres	45.62 SB	4 q	45.46 SB	6	Did not advance	
Alexander Doom	400 metres	Bye		44.87	1 Q	44.15 CHB NR	1st place, gold medalist(s)
Jonathan Sacoor	400 metres	45.50	1 q	44.99 PB	2 Q	44.98 PB	4
Eliott Crestan	800 metres	1:46.48	4	Did not advance			
Tibo De Smet	800 metres	1:46.71	6	Did not advance			
Pieter Sisk	800 metres	1:45.87	8	Did not advance			
Ismael Debjani	1500 metres	3:42.57 SB	12	—N/a		Did not advance	
Ruben Verheyden	1500 metres	3:44.19	3 Q	—N/a		3:33.40 PB	4
Jochem Vermeulen	1500 metres	3:40.21	8 qR	—N/a		3:33.30 PB	2nd place, silver medalist(s)
Robin Hendrix	5000 metres	—N/a				13:36.19	20
John Heymans	5000 metres	—N/a				13:25.99	10
Isaac Kimeli	10,000 metres	—N/a				28:17.84	14
Elie Bacari	110 metres hurdles	13.61	1 q	13.44 PB	4 q	DQ	
Michael Obasuyi	110 metres hurdles	Bye		13.31	2 Q	13.46	6
Clément Deflandre	3000 metres steeplechase	DNF		—N/a		Did not advance	
Rémi Schyns	3000 metres steeplechase	DNF		—N/a		Did not advance	
Tim Van de Velde	3000 metres steeplechase	DNF		—N/a		Did not advance	
Dorian Boulvin	Half marathon	—N/a				1:03:15	23
Simon Debognies	Half marathon	—N/a				1:02:15	15
Michael Somers	Half marathon	—N/a				1:03:20 SB	25
Ward Merckx; Antoine Snyders; Simon Verherstraeten; Kobe Vleminckx	4 × 100 metres relay	38.55 NR	2 Q	—N/a		38.65	4
Dylan Borlée; Alexander Doom; Christian Iguacel; Florent Mabille; Jonathan Sacoor; Robin Vanderbemden	4 × 400 metres relay	3:01.09	2 Q	—N/a		2:59.84 EL	1st place, gold medalist(s)

Field events

Athlete	Event	Qualification		Final	
Athlete	Event	Distance	Position	Distance	Position
Thomas Carmoy	High jump	2.21	=1 q	2.26 SB	4
Ben Broeders	Pole vault	5.60	=1 q	5.50	12
Philip Milanov	Discus throw	60.49	21	Did not advance	
Timothy Herman	Javelin throw	77.35	19	Did not advance	

Combined events – Decathlon

Athlete	Event	100 m	LJ	SP	HJ	400 m	110H	DT	PV	JT	1500 m	Final	Rank
Jente Hauttekeete	Result	10.91 SB	7.04	14.57 SB	2.08	48.63 PB	14.41	39.87	5.00 =SB	56.52 PB	4:28.85 PB	8156 PB	8
Jente Hauttekeete	Points	881	823	763	878	879	922	662	910	686	752	8156 PB	8
Thomas van der Plaetsen	Result	11.52 SB	7.47	14.13	1.96 SB	50.72 SB	14.75 SB	47.37 SB	5.00 =SB	68.45 SB	4:44.54 SB	8084	11
Thomas van der Plaetsen	Points	748	927	736	767	782	880	816	910	866	652	8084	11

Women
Track and road events

Athlete	Event	Heat		Semifinal		Final	
Athlete	Event	Result	Rank	Result	Rank	Result	Rank
Rani Rosius	100 metres	11.20 SB	1 q	11.25	5	Did not advance	
Delphine Nkansa	100 metres	11.28 SB	2 q	11.21 PB	4	Did not advance	
Helena Ponette	400 metres	52.57	3^{1}	51.65	4	Did not advance	
Elise Vanderelst	1500 metres	4:11.03	9	—N/a		Did not advance	
Chloé Herbiet	10,000 metres	—N/a				32:17.88	10
Jana Van Lent	10,000 metres	—N/a				32:35.23	11
Anne Zagré	100 metres hurdles	13.79	7	Did not advance			
Hanne Claes	400 metres hurdles	Bye		55.36 SB	6	Did not advance	
Paulien Couckuyt	400 metres hurdles	55.73	3 q	55.24	4	Did not advance	
Juliette Thomas	Half marathon	—N/a				1:11:35	21
Hanne Verbruggen	Half marathon	—N/a				1:12:12	30
Janie De Naeyer; Elise Mehuys; Delphine Nkansa; Rani Rosius; Rani Vincke	4 × 100 metres relay	42.85 SB	4 q	—N/a		43.48	6
Cynthia Bolingo; Camille Laus; Helena Ponette; Naomi Van den Broeck; Imke Vervaet	4 × 400 metres relay	3:25.16 SB	3 Q	—N/a		3:22.95 SB	3rd place, bronze medalist(s)

^{1}proceeded through to the semi-finals as 'lucky loser' after the withdrawal of 2 athletes

Field events

Athlete	Event	Qualification		Final	
Athlete	Event	Distance	Position	Distance	Position
Merel Maes	High jump	1.85	=19	Did not advance	
Elien Vekemans	Pole vault	NM		Did not advance	

Combined events – Heptathlon

Athlete	Event	100H	HJ	SP	200 m	LJ	JT	800 m	Final	Rank
Nafissatou Thiam	Result	13.74 SB	1.95 SB	15.06 SB	24.81 SB	5.59 SB	53.00 SB	2:11.79 PB	6848 CHB WL	1st place, gold medalist(s)
Nafissatou Thiam	Points	1015	1171	865	904	1036	918	939	6848 CHB WL	1st place, gold medalist(s)
Noor Vidts	Result	13.16 PB	1.80	14.79 PB	23.85 SB	6.46	42.12 PB	2:09.35 SB	6596 PB	3rd place, bronze medalist(s)
Noor Vidts	Points	1100	978	847	995	994	708	974	6596 PB	3rd place, bronze medalist(s)

Mixed
Track and road events

Athlete	Event	Heat		Semifinal		Final	
Athlete	Event	Result	Rank	Result	Rank	Result	Rank
Helena Ponette; Naomi Van Den Broeck; Alexander Doom; Jonathan Sacoor	4 × 400 metres relay	—N/a				3.11.03	4 NR

Jordan Pacquot, Liefde Schoemaker and Lotte Van Lent were in the selection of the relay teams but did not participate.
