= Belgium at the European Athletics Championships =

- WA code: BEL
- National federation: Royal Belgian Athletics Federation
- Website: www.belgian-athletics.be
- Medals: Gold 16 Silver 16 Bronze 15 Total 47

European Athletics Championships appearances (overview)
- 1934; 1938; 1946; 1950; 1954; 1958; 1962; 1966; 1969; 1971; 1974; 1978; 1982; 1986; 1990; 1994; 1998; 2002; 2006; 2010; 2012; 2014; 2016; 2018; 2022; 2024; 2026

These are the results of the Belgian athletes at the European Athletics Championships.

== List of medalists ==
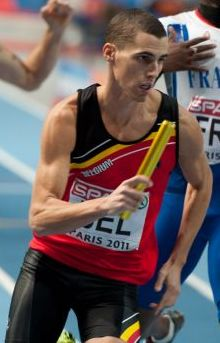
Kevin Borlée

=== Men ===
Medal	Athlete	Championship	Discipline
Silver	Joseph Mostert	1938 Paris	1500 m
Silver	Hippolyte Braekman	1946 Oslo	110 m hurdles
Bronze	Gaston Reiff	1950 Brussels	5000 m
Silver	Lucien De Muynck	1954 Bern	800 m
Gold	Gaston Roelants	1962 Belgrade	3,000 m steeplechase
Silver	Aurèle Vandendriessche	1962 Belgrade	Marathon
Silver	Aurèle Vandendriessche	1966 Budapest	Marathon
Bronze	Gaston Roelants	1966 Budapest	3,000 m steeplechase
Silver	Gaston Roelants	1969 Athens	Marathon
Gold	Karel Lismont	1971 Helsinki	Marathon
Bronze	Gaston Roelants	1974 Rome	Marathon
Bronze	Karel Lismont	1978 Prague	Marathon
Silver	Armand Parmentier	1982 Athens	Marathon
Bronze	Karel Lismont	1982 Athens	Marathon
Silver	Vincent Rousseau	1994 Helsinki	10,000 m
Bronze	Patrick Stevens	1994 Helsinki	200 m
Bronze	William Van Dijck	1994 Helsinki	3,000 m steeplechase
Gold	Kevin Borlée	2010 Barcelona	400 m
Bronze	Jonathan Borlée (only final); Kevin Borlée; Arnaud Destatte (only final); Nils Duerinck (only heat); Antoine Gillet (only heat); Cédric Van Branteghem	2010 Barcelona	4 × 400 metres relay
Gold	Jonathan Borlée (only final); Kevin Borlée; Jente Bouckaert; Nils Duerinck (only heat); Antoine Gillet	2012 Helsinki	4 × 400 metres relay
Gold	Thomas van der Plaetsen	2016 Amsterdam	Decathlon
Gold	Jonathan Borlée; Kevin Borlée (only final); Dylan Borlée; Robin Vanderbemden (only heat); Julien Watrin	2016 Amsterdam	4 × 400 metres relay
Silver	Philip Milanov	2016 Amsterdam	Discus throw
Gold	Jonathan Borlée (only final); Kevin Borlée (only final); Dylan Borlée; Jonathan Sacoor; Robin Vanderbemden (only heat); Julien Watrin (only heat)	2018 Berlin	4 × 400 metres relay
Gold	Koen Naert	2018 Berlin	Marathon
Silver	Bashir Abdi	2018 Berlin	10,000 m
Silver	Kevin Borlée	2018 Berlin	400 m
Bronze	Jonathan Borlée	2018 Berlin	400 m
Silver	Dylan Borlée; Jonathan Borlée (only heats); Kevin Borlée (only final); Alexander Doom; Jonathan Sacoor(only heats); Julien Watrin (only final)	2022 Munich	4 × 400 metres relay
Gold	Alexander Doom	2024 Rome	400 m
Gold	Dylan Borlée; Alexander Doom; Christian Iguacel; Florent Mabille; Jonathan Sacoor; Robin Vanderbemden	2024 Rome	4 × 400 metres relay
Silver	Jochem Vermeulen	2024 Rome	1500 m
Bronze	Emiel Botterman; Ibrahim Camara; Amine Kasmi (only heats); Antoine Snyders; Simon Verherstraeten; Cedric Verschueren (only heats)	2026 Birmingham	Men's 4 × 100 metres relay

=== Women ===
Medal	Athlete	Championship	Discipline
Silver	Kim Gevaert	2002 Munich	100 m
Silver	Kim Gevaert	2002 Munich	200 m
Gold	Kim Gevaert	2006 Gothenburg	100 m
Gold	Kim Gevaert	2006 Gothenburg	200 m
Gold	Tia Hellebaut	2006 Gothenburg	High jump
Bronze	Svetlana Bolshakova	2010 Barcelona	Triple jump
Bronze	Nafissatou Thiam	2014 Zürich	Heptathlon
Gold	Nafissatou Thiam	2018 Berlin	Heptathlon
Gold	Nafissatou Thiam	2022 Munich	Heptathlon
Gold	Nafissatou Thiam	2024 Rome	Heptathlon
Bronze	Noor Vidts	2024 Rome	Heptathlon
Bronze	Cynthia Bolingo; Camille Laus; Helena Ponette; Naomi Van Den Broeck; Imke Vervaet	2024 Rome	4 × 400 metres relay
Silver	Saliyya Guisse	2026 Birmingham	Triple jump
Bronze	Delphine Nkansa	2026 Birmingham	100 m
Bronze	Jana Van Lent	2026 Birmingham	10,000 m

== See also ==
- Belgium at the World Athletics Championships
- Belgium at the World Indoor Athletics Championships
- Belgium at the European Athletics Indoor Championships
