= Belgium at the 2022 European Athletics Championships =

- WA code: BEL
- National federation: Royal Belgian Athletics League
- Website: www.belgian-athletics.be

in Munich
- Competitors: 59 (34 men and 25 women) in 32 events
- Medals Ranked 17th: Gold 1 Silver 1 Bronze 0 Total 2

European Athletics Championships appearances (overview)
- 1934; 1938; 1946; 1950; 1954; 1958; 1962; 1966; 1969; 1971; 1974; 1978; 1982; 1986; 1990; 1994; 1998; 2002; 2006; 2010; 2012; 2014; 2016; 2018; 2022; 2024; 2026

Belgium competed at the 2022 European Athletics Championships in Munich, Germany, between 15 and 21 August 2022. A delegation of 59 athletes was sent to represent the country.

== Medals ==
Medal	Name	Event	Date
Gold	Nafissatou Thiam	Women's heptathlon	18 August
Silver	Dylan Borlée; Kevin Borlée; Alexander Doom; Julien Watrin	Men's 4×400 m relay	20 August

== Results ==
The following athletes were selected to compete by the Royal Belgian Athletics Federation.

- including alternates

Key

- Note–Ranks given for track events are within the athlete's heat only
- Q = Qualified for the next round
- q = Qualified for the next round as a fastest loser or, in field events, by position without achieving the qualifying target
- NR = National record
- CHB = Championship best
- WL = World Leading
- PB = Personal best
- SB = Season's best
- — = Round not applicable for the event
- Bye = Athlete not required to compete in round
- DNF = Did not finish
- DNS = Did not start
- NM = No valid trial recorded

Men
Track and road events

Athlete	Event	Heat		Semifinal		Final	
Athlete	Event	Result	Rank	Result	Rank	Result	Rank
Kobe Vleminckx	100 metres	10.34	3 Q	10.34	7	did not advance	
Robin Vanderbemden	200 metres	20.90	5	did not advance			
Dylan Borlée	400 metres	Bye		45.67	2 Q	45.39	5
Kevin Borlée	400 metres	Bye		DNF		did not advance	
Alexander Doom	400 metres	Bye		45.77	6	did not advance	
Eliott Crestan	800 metres	1:47.41	1 Q	1:47.13	5 q	1:45.68 SB	8
Tibo De Smet	800 metres	1:46.48	4 q	1:49.10	6	did not advance	
Aurèle Vandeputte	800 metres	1:48.46	8	did not advance			
Ismael Debjani	1500 metres	3:38.96	2 Q	—N/a		3:43.28	12
Tarik Moukrime	1500 metres	3:41.46	11	—N/a		did not advance	
Ruben Verheyden	1500 metres	3:44.76	13	—N/a		did not advance	
Isaac Kimeli	5000 metres	—N/a				13:33.39	11
Michael Somers	5000 metres	—N/a				13:57.82	23
Simon Debognies	10,000 metres	—N/a				28:08.60	13
Isaac Kimeli	10,000 metres	—N/a				DNF	
Michael Somers	10,000 metres	—N/a				29:10.13	21
Michael Obasuyi	110 metres hurdles	13.90	5	did not advance			
Dries Van Nieuwenhove	400 metres hurdles	50.85	3	51.14	8	did not advance	
Julien Watrin	400 metres hurdles	Bye		48.81 NR	3 q	48.98	6
Rémi Schyns	3000 metres steeplechase	9:21.85	16	—N/a		did not advance	
Tim Van de Velde	3000 metres steeplechase	8:38.23	9	—N/a		did not advance	
Soufiane Bouchikhi	Marathon	—N/a				DNF	
Koen Naert	Marathon	—N/a				2:11:28 SB	8
Nicolaï Saké	Marathon	—N/a				DNF	
Valentijn Hoornaert^{3} Ward Merckx; Jordan Paquot^{2} Robin Vanderbemden; Simon Verherstraeten^{1} Kobe Vleminckx	4 × 100 metres relay	38.73 NR	4 q	—N/a		39.01	6
Dylan Borlée; Jonathan Borlée^{1} Kévin Borlée^{2} Alexander Doom; Jonathan Sacoor^{1} Julien Watrin^{2}	4 × 400 metres relay	3:01.81	4 q	—N/a		2:59.49	2nd place, silver medalist(s)

^{1}ran only the heats ^{2} ran only the final ^{3}did not come in action

Field events

Athlete	Event	Qualification		Final	
Athlete	Event	Distance	Position	Distance	Position
Thomas Carmoy	High jump	2.21	=1 q	2.23	5
Ben Broeders	Pole vault	5.50	=15	did not advance	
Philip Milanov	Discus throw	61.04	15	did not advance	
Timothy Herman	Javelin throw	77.20	12 q	74.84	10

Combined events – Decathlon

Athlete	Event	100 m	LJ	SP	HJ	400 m	110H	DT	PV	JT	1500 m	Final	Rank
Niels Pittomvils	Result	11.32 SB	7.10 SB	15.25	2.02 SB	51.09	14.81 SB	46.77 SB	4.70	56.30	4:42.62 SB	7862	12
Niels Pittomvils	Points	791	838	805	822	765	873	803	819	682	664	7862	12

Women
Track and road events

Athlete	Event	Heat		Semifinal		Final	
Athlete	Event	Result	Rank	Result	Rank	Result	Rank
Rani Rosius	100 metres	11.47	5 q	11.53	6	did not advance	
Delphine Nkansa	100 metres	11.33	1 Q	11.39	4	did not advance	
Delphine Nkansa	200 metres	23.08	2 Q	23.28	4	did not advance	
Imke Vervaet	200 metres	23.05 =PB	2 Q	23.48	6	did not advance	
Cynthia Bolingo	400 metres	Bye		50.83 SB	2 Q	50.94	7
Camille Laus	400 metres	51.91	4 q	54.28	8	did not advance	
Naomi Van den Broeck	400 metres	52.80	7	did not advance			
Vanessa Scaunet	800 metres	DNF		did not advance			
Elise Vanderelst	1500 metres	4:07.62	7	—N/a		did not advance	
Lisa Rooms	5000 metres	—N/a				15:50.59 PB	15
Anne Zagré	100 metres hurdles	13.12	1 Q	13.12	5	did not advance	
Hanne Claes	400 metres hurdles	Bye		55.31	4	did not advance	
Paulien Couckuyt	400 metres hurdles	Bye		56.14	6	did not advance	
Nina Hespel	400 metres hurdles	56.72	5 q	59.15	7	did not advance	
Eline Daelemans	3000 metres steeplechase	10:15.73	16	—N/a		did not advance	
Mieke Gorissen	Marathon	—N/a				2:31:48	13
Hanne Verbruggen	Marathon	—N/a				2:29:44 SB	8
Astrid Verhoeven	Marathon	—N/a				2:40:03	33
Team	Marathon	—N/a				7:41:35	4
Marine Jehaes^{3} Elise Mehuys; Delphine Nkansa; Mariam Oularé^{3} Rani Rosius; Rani Vincke	4 × 100 metres relay	43.58 SB	4 q	—N/a		43.98	6
Cynthia Bolingo^{2} Hanne Claes^{2} Camille Laus; Helena Ponnet; Naomi Van den Broeck^{1} Imke Vervaet^{1}	4 × 400 metres relay	3:25.44 SB	2 Q	—N/a		3:22.12 NR	4

^{1} ran only the heats ^{2}ran only the final ^{3}did not come in action

Field events

Athlete	Event	Qualification		Final	
Athlete	Event	Distance	Position	Distance	Position
Vanessa Sterckendries	Hammer throw	66.95	11	did not advance	

Combined events – Heptathlon

Athlete	Event	100H	HJ	SP	200 m	LJ	JT	800 m	Final	Rank
Nafissatou Thiam	Result	13.34	1.98 CHB PB	14.95	24.64	6.08	48.89	2:17.95	6628	1st place, gold medalist(s)
Nafissatou Thiam	Points	1074	1211	858	920	874	839	852	6628	1st place, gold medalist(s)
Noor Vidts	Result	13.29	1.83	13.86	24.14	6.31	41.82 PB	2:09.63	6467	4
Noor Vidts	Points	1081	1016	785	967	946	702	970	6467	4
