= Belgium at the 2012 European Athletics Championships =

- WA code: BEL
- National federation: Royal Belgian Athletics League
- Website: www.belgian-athletics.be

in Zürich
- Medals: Gold 1 Silver 0 Bronze 0 Total 1

European Athletics Championships appearances (overview)
- 1934; 1938; 1946; 1950; 1954; 1958; 1962; 1966; 1969; 1971; 1974; 1978; 1982; 1986; 1990; 1994; 1998; 2002; 2006; 2010; 2012; 2014; 2016; 2018; 2022; 2024; 2026

Belgium competed at the 2012 European Athletics Championships held in Helsinki, Finland, between 27 June to 1 July 2012.

== Medals ==
Medal	Name	Event	Date
Gold	Antoine Gillet; Jonathan Borlée; Jente Bouckaert; Kevin Borlée	Men's 4 × 400 m relay	1 July

== Results ==
=== Men ===
==== Track ====
Event	Athletes	Heats		Semifinal		Final	
Event	Athletes	Result	Rank	Result	Rank	Result	Rank
200 m	Jonathan Borlée	20.61	1 Q	20.74	4 Q	20.99	4
400 m	Jonathan Borlée	46.37	13 Q	DQ		did not advance	
400 m	Antoine Gillet	46.62	17 Q	47.15	19	did not advance	
800 m	Jan van den Broeck	1:48.35	22 Q	1:50.63	23	did not advance	
5000 m	Bashir Abdi	—N/a				13:39.01	8
5000 m	Mats Lunders	—N/a				14:06.55	21
10000 m	Bashir Abdi	—N/a				28:23.72	4
10000 m	Mats Lunders	—N/a				29:16.46	16
10000 m	Koen Naert	—N/a				29:02.08	11
110 m hurdles	Adrien Deghelt	13.66	14 q	DNF		did not advance	
110 m hurdles	Dario Seghers	13.95	22 Q	13.81	21	did not advance	
400 m hurdles	Michaël Bultheel	49.65	1 Q	49.98	10	did not advance	
4 × 400 m relay	Nils Duerinck; Antoine Gillet; Jonathan Borlée; Jente Bouckaert; Kevin Borlée	3:05.29	1 Q	—N/a		3:01.09	1st place, gold medalist(s)

==== Combined ====
Decathlon	Event	Cédric Nolf		
Decathlon	Event	Results	Points	Rank
	100 m	10.93	876	5
	Long jump	7.13	845	14
	Shot put	13.07	672	21
	High jump	1.88	696	19
	400 m	49.74	827	13
	110 m hurdles	14.79	875	16
	Discus	37.90	622	20
	Pole vault	4.60	790	14
	Javelin	DNS		
	1500 m	DNS		
Final			DNF	

=== Women ===
==== Track ====
Event	Athletes	Heats		Semifinal		Final	
Event	Athletes	Result	Rank	Result	Rank	Result	Rank
200 m	Olivia Borlée	23.77	20 Q	23.66	17	did not advance	
200 m	Hanne Claes	23.26	9 Q	23.68	19	did not advance	
5000 m	Almensh Belete	—N/a				15:22.15	8
5000 m	Barbara Maveau	—N/a				15:33.68	13
100 m hurdles	Eline Berings	13.09	7 Q	13.17	9	did not advance	
100 m hurdles	Anne Zagré	13.14	13 q	13.08	4 Q	13.02	5
400 m hurdles	Axelle Dauwens	57.19	17	did not advance			
400 m hurdles	Élodie Ouédraogo	55.39	3 Q	55.77	6 Q	55.95	6
4 × 100 m relay	Olivia Borlée; Hanna Mariën; Hanne Claes; Anne Zagré	43.81	9	—N/a		did not advance	

==== Field ====
Event	Athletes	Qualification		Final	
Event	Athletes	Result	Rank	Result	Rank
Triple jump	Svetlana Bolshakova	14.09	11 q	14.07	9

==== Combined ====
Heptathlon	Event	Sara Aerts		
Heptathlon	Event	Results	Points	Rank
	100 m hurdles	14.25	943	17
	High jump	DNS		
	Shot Put	DNS		
	200 m	DNS		
	Long jump			
	Javelin throw			
	800 m			
Final			DNF	
