= Belgium at the 2010 European Athletics Championships =

- WA code: BEL
- National federation: Royal Belgian Athletics League
- Website: www.belgian-athletics.be

in Barcelona
- Medals: Gold 1 Silver 0 Bronze 2 Total 3

European Athletics Championships appearances (overview)
- 1934; 1938; 1946; 1950; 1954; 1958; 1962; 1966; 1969; 1971; 1974; 1978; 1982; 1986; 1990; 1994; 1998; 2002; 2006; 2010; 2012; 2014; 2016; 2018; 2022; 2024; 2026

Belgium was represented by 31 athletes (15 male/16 female) at the 2010 European Athletics Championships held in Barcelona, Spain, from 27 July to 1 August 2010.

== Medals ==
| Medal | Name | Event | Date |
|---|---|---|---|
| Gold | Kevin Borlée | Men's 400 m | 30 July |
| Bronze | Svetlana Bolshakova | Women's Triple jump | 31 July |
| Bronze | Jonathan Borlée^{1} Kevin Borlée; Arnaud Destatte^{1} Nils Duerinck^{2} Antoine Gillet^{2} Cédric Van Branteghem | Men's 4 × 400 m relay | 1 August |

^{1}only the final ^{2}only the heats

== Participants ==
=== Men ===
==== Track and road events ====
| Event | Athletes | Heats | | Semifinal | | Final | |
| Event | Athletes | Result | Rank | Result | Rank | Result | Rank |
|---|---|---|---|---|---|---|---|
| 400 m | Jonathan Borlée | 45.91 | 6 Q | 44.71 (NR, EL) | 1 Q | 45.35 | 7 |
| 400 m | Kevin Borlée | 45.71 | 2 Q | 45.32 | 7 Q | 45.08 | 1st place, gold medalist(s) |
| 400 m | Arnaud Destatte | 46.42 | 18 Q | 46.38 | 18 | Did not advance | |
| 800 m | Andreas Smout | 1:52.04 | 27 | Did not advance | | | |
| 800 m | Jan Van den Broeck | 1:51.79 | 25 | Did not advance | | | |
| 1500 m | Kim Ruell | 3:42.94 | 16 | | | Did not advance | |
| 1500 m | Kristof Van Malderen | 3:42.80 | 14 | | | Did not advance | |
| 10000 m | Monder Rizki | | | | | Did not finish | |
| 400 m hurdles | Michael Bultheel | 50.48 | 11 Q | 50.60 | 11 | Did not advance | |
| 400 m hurdles | Nils Duerinck | 50.89 | 15 Q | 50.46 | 9 | Did not advance | |
| 400 m hurdles | Stef Vanhaeren | 50.71 PB | 13 q | 50.86 | 12 | Did not advance | |
| 3000 m steeplechase | Pieter Desmet | Did not finish | | | | Did not advance | |
| 3000 m steeplechase | Krijn Van Koolwijk | 8:33.00 | 15 | | | Did not advance | |
| 4 × 400 m relay | Jonathan Borlée; Kevin Borlée; Arnaud Destatte; Nils Duerinck; Antoine Gillet; Cédric Van Branteghem | 3:03.49 | 1 Q | | | 3:02.60 | 3rd place, bronze medalist(s) |

==== Combined events ====
| Decathlon | Event | Hans van Alphen | | |
| Decathlon | Event | Results | Points | Rank |
|---|---|---|---|---|
| | 100 m | 11.20 | 817 | 19 |
| | Long jump | 7.26 (SB) | 876 | 17 |
| | Shot put | 15.08 (SB) | 795 | 4 |
| | High jump | 1.89 | 705 | 20 |
| | 400 m | 49.44 | 841 | 14 |
| | 110 m hurdles | 14.89 (SB) | 863 | 12 |
| | Discus throw | 47.67 (PB) | 822 | 2 |
| | Pole vault | 4.75 (PB) | 834 | 11 |
| | Javelin throw | 58.47 | 715 | 11 |
| | 1500 m | 4:21.06 | 804 | 3 |
| Final | | | 8072 (PB) | 5 |

=== Women ===
==== Track and road events ====
| Event | Athletes | Heats | | Semifinal | | Final | |
| Event | Athletes | Result | Rank | Result | Rank | Result | Rank |
|---|---|---|---|---|---|---|---|
| 200 m | Olivia Borlée | 23.59 | 10 Q | 23.44 | 13 | Did not advance | |
| 1500 m | Lindsey De Grande | 4:10.24 PB | 18 | | | Did not advance | |
| 100 m hurdles | Eline Berings | 13.27 | 17 | Did not advance | | | |
| 100 m hurdles | Elisabeth Davin | 13.12 SB | 9 Q | 13.15 | 13 | Did not advance | |
| 100 m hurdles | Anne Zagré | 13.31 | 19 | Did not advance | | | |
| 400 m hurdles | Elodie Ouedraogo | 55.80 | 9 Q | 58.60 | 16 | Did not advance | |
| 4 × 100 m relay | Olivia Borlée; Hanna Mariën; Elodie Ouedraogo; Frauke Penen | 43.82 | 6 q | | | Did not finish | |
| 4 × 400 m relay | Elke Bogemans; Lindsy Cozijns; Axelle Dauwens; Wendy Den Haeze | 3:37.56 | 13 | | | Did not advance | |

==== Field events ====
| Event | Athletes | Qualification | | Final | |
| Event | Athletes | Result | Rank | Result | Rank |
|---|---|---|---|---|---|
| Triple jump | Svetlana Bolshakova | 14.33 | 7 Q | 14.55 (NR) | 3rd place, bronze medalist(s) |
| High jump | Hannelore Desmet | 1.83 | 25 | Did not advance | |
| High jump | Tia Hellebaut | 1.92 | 12 Q | 1.97 SB | 5 |

==== Combined events ====
| Heptathlon | Event | Sara Aerts | | |
| Heptathlon | Event | Results | Points | Rank |
|---|---|---|---|---|
| | 100 m | 13.38 | 1068 | 3 |
| | High jump | 1.74 | 903 | 13 |
| | Shot put | 13.13 | 736 | 14 |
| | 200 m | 24.62 | 922 | 9 |
| | Long jump | 6.17 | 902 | 11 |
| | Javelin throw | 40.30 =PB | 673 | 17 |
| | 800 m | 2.15.90 PB | 880 | 13 |
| | Final | | 6084 PB | 12 |
