= Belgium at the 2006 European Athletics Championships =

- WA code: BEL
- National federation: Royal Belgian Athletics League
- Website: www.belgian-athletics.be

in Zürich
- Medals: Gold 3 Silver 0 Bronze 0 Total 3

European Athletics Championships appearances (overview)
- 1934; 1938; 1946; 1950; 1954; 1958; 1962; 1966; 1969; 1971; 1974; 1978; 1982; 1986; 1990; 1994; 1998; 2002; 2006; 2010; 2012; 2014; 2016; 2018; 2022; 2024

Belgium sent 32 athletes to the 2006 European Athletics Championships, which is a very big delegation for Belgium, as they only once sent more athletes, 44 to the 1950 European Athletics Championships. The most important names were Kim Gevaert, Tia Hellebaut and Cédric Van Branteghem.

== Results ==
2006 Gothenburg	Gold	Silver	Bronze	Total
Belgium (BEL)	3	0	0	3

Place	Athlete	Event	Result
1	Kim Gevaert	100m W	F: 11.06
1	Kim Gevaert	200m W	F: 22.68
1	Tia Hellebaut	High Jump W	F: 2m03 CR/NR
4	Kristof Beyens	200m M	F: 20.57 SB
5	Veerle Dejaeghere	3,000m Steeplechase W	F: 9:35.78
9	Hanna Mariën	200m W	SF: 23.59
10	Tom Compernolle	5,000m M	F: 14:03.37
10	Nathalie De Vos	10,000m W	F: 31:45.94 PB
11	Olivia Borlée	200m W	SF: 23.90
11	Nathalie De Vos	5,000m W	F: 15:22:68 PB
11	Monder Rizki	5,000m M	F: 14:04.96
13	Pieter Desmet	3,000m Steeplechase M	SF: 8:32.93
13	François Gourmet	Decathlon M	7921 SB
13	Thomas Matthys	800m M	SF: 1:49.65
13	Tom van Hooste	5,000m M	F: 14:15.32
15	Willem van Hoof	10,000m M	F: 28:57.11
15	Erik Wijmeersch	100m M	SF: 10.47
16	Jesse Stroobants	10,000m M	F: 28:59.91
16	Cédric Van Branteghem	400m M	SF: DNF
17	Monder Rizki	10,000m M	F: 29:13.62
17	Michael Velter	Triple Jump M	Q: 16m56
21	Tim Clerbout	1,500m M	SF: 3:48.43
22	Eline Berings	100m Hurdles W	R1: 13.42
23	Kevin Rans	Pole Vault M	Q: 5.35
27	Matthieu Vandiest	1,500m M	SF: 3:50.28
DNF	Fatiha Baouf	10,000m W	
DNF	Belgium	4 × 100 m Relay W	F: DNF
DNF	Belgium	4 × 100 m Relay M	SF: DNF
DNF	Jonathan Nsenga	110m Hurdles M	
DNF	Anja Smolders	10,000m W	

== Competitors ==
=== Men ===
100m: Erik Wijmeersch
200m: Kristof Beyens
400m: Cédric Van Branteghem
800m: Thomas Matthys
1,500m: Tim Clerbout, Matthieu Vandiest
5,000m: Tom Compernolle, Monder Rizki, Tom Van Hooste
10,000m: Monder Rizki, Jesse Stroobants, Willem Van Hoof
3,000m Steeplechase: Pieter Desmet
110m Hurdles: Jonathan N'Senga
4 × 100 m Relay: Kristof Beyens, Nathan Bongelo, Xavier De Baerdemaker, Tom Schippers, Erik Wijmeersch
Pole Vault: Kevin Rans
Triple Jump: Michael Velter
Decathlon: François Gourmet

=== Women ===
100m: Kim Gevaert
200m: Olivia Borlée, Kim Gevaert, Hanna Mariën
5,000m: Nathalie De Vos
10,000m: Fatiha Baouf, Nathalie De Vos, Anja Smolders
3,000m Steeplechase: Veerle Dejaeghere
100m Hurdles: Eline Berings
4 × 100 m Relay: Olivia Borlée, Elizabeth Davin, Kim Gevaert, Hanna Mariën, Élodie Ouédraogo, Frauke Penen.
High Jump: Tia Hellebaut
