= Belgium at the 2018 European Athletics Championships =

- WA code: BEL
- National federation: Royal Belgian Athletics League
- Website: www.belgian-athletics.be

in Berlin
- Competitors: 34 (20 men and 14 women) in 23 events
- Medals Ranked =5th: Gold 3 Silver 2 Bronze 1 Total 6

European Athletics Championships appearances (overview)
- 1934; 1938; 1946; 1950; 1954; 1958; 1962; 1966; 1969; 1971; 1974; 1978; 1982; 1986; 1990; 1994; 1998; 2002; 2006; 2010; 2012; 2014; 2016; 2018; 2022; 2024; 2026

Belgium competed at the 2018 European Athletics Championships in Berlin, Germany, between 7 and 12 August 2018. A delegation of 34 athletes were sent to represent the country.

The following athletes were selected to compete by the Royal Belgian Athletics League.

== Medals ==
| Medal | Name | Event | Date |
|---|---|---|---|
| Gold | Nafissatou Thiam | Heptathlon | 10 August |
| Gold | Dylan Borlée; Jonathan Borlée; Kevin Borlée; Jonathan Sacoor; Robin Vanderbemden*; Julien Watrin* | Men's 4 × 400 metres relay | 11 August |
| Gold | Koen Naert | Men's marathon | 12 August |
| Silver | Bashir Abdi | Men's 10,000 metres | 7 August |
| Silver | Kevin Borlée | Men's 400 metres | 10 August |
| Bronze | Jonathan Borlée | Men's 400 metres | 10 August |

* – Indicates the athlete competed in preliminaries but not the final

== Results ==
Men
Track and road

| Athletes | Event | Heats | | Semifinal | | Final | |
| Athletes | Event | Result | Rank | Result | Rank | Result | Rank |
|---|---|---|---|---|---|---|---|
| Robin Vanderbemden | 200 metres | 20.50 | 3 Q | 20.62 | 14 | did not advance | |
| Dylan Borlée | 400 metres | 45.84 | 10 Q | 45.63 | 17 | did not advance | |
| Jonathan Borlée | 400 metres | 45.19 SB | 1 Q | 44.87 SB | 2 Q | 45.19 | 3rd place, bronze medalist(s) |
| Kevin Borlée | 400 metres | 45.29 SB | 2 Q | 45.07 SB | 5 q | 45.13 | 2nd place, silver medalist(s) |
| Elliott Crestan | 800 metres | 1:47.35 | 12 | did not advance | | | |
| Peter Callahan | 1500 metres | 3:54.23 | 30 | —N/a | | did not advance | |
| Ismael Debjani | 1500 metres | 3:41.09 | 9 q | —N/a | | 3:39.48 | 8 |
| Isaac Kimeli | 1500 metres | 3:42.77 | 15 | —N/a | | did not advance | |
| Soufiane Bouchikhi | 5000 metres | —N/a | | | | 13:25.22 | 10 |
| Robin Hendrix | 5000 metres | —N/a | | | | 3:39.48 | 8 |
| Isaac Kimeli | 5000 metres | —N/a | | | | Disqualified | |
| Bashir Abdi | 10,000 metres | —N/a | | | | 28:11.76 | 2nd place, silver medalist(s) |
| Soufiane Bouchikhi | 10,000 metres | —N/a | | | | 28:19.04 | 6 |
| Simon Debognies | 10,000 metres | —N/a | | | | 29:00.98 | 15 |
| Koen Naert | Marathon | —N/a | | | | 2:09:51 CR | 1st place, gold medalist(s) |
| Michael Obasuyi | 110 metres hurdles | 13.78 | 13 q | 13.78 | 23 | did not advance | |
| Dylan Borlée; Jonathan Borlée; Kevin Borlée; Jonathan Sacoor; Robin Vanderbemden*; Julien Watrin* | 4 × 400 metres relay | 3:02.55 | 4 Q | —N/a | | 2:59.47 EL | 1st place, gold medalist(s) |

* – Indicates the athlete competed in preliminaries but not the final

Field events

| Athletes | Event | Qualification | | Final | |
| Athletes | Event | Distance | Position | Distance | Position |
|---|---|---|---|---|---|
| Bram Ghuys | High jump | 2.16 | 25 | did not advance | |
| Arnaud Art | Pole vault | 5.61 | 9 q | 5.65 | 9 |
| Ben Broeders | Pole vault | No mark | | did not advance | |
| Corentin Campener | Long jump | 7.41 | 27 | did not advance | |

Combined events – Decathlon

| Athlete | Event | 100 m | LJ | SP | HJ | 400 m | 110H | DT | PV | JT | 1500 m | Final | Rank |
|---|---|---|---|---|---|---|---|---|---|---|---|---|---|
| Thomas van der Plaetsen | Result | 11.48 | 7.41 | 13.35 | 2.05 | DNS | did not finish | | | | | | |
| Thomas van der Plaetsen | Points | 757 | 913 | 689 | 850 | 0 | did not finish | | | | | | |

Women
Track and road

| Athletes | Event | Heats | | Semifinal | | Final | |
| Athletes | Event | Result | Rank | Result | Rank | Result | Rank |
|---|---|---|---|---|---|---|---|
| Manon Depuydt | 200 metres | 23.59 | 9 q | 23.60 | 20 | did not advance | |
| Cynthia Bolingo Mbongo | 400 metres | 51.69 PB | 2 Q | 51.92 | 16 | did not advance | |
| Camille Laus | 400 metres | 52.40 | 12 Q | 52.40 | 21 | did not advance | |
| Renée Eykens | 800 metres | 2:56.24 | 32 | did not advance | | | |
| Elise Vanderelst | 1500 metres | 4:10.30 | 13 | —N/a | | did not advance | |
| Louise Carton | 5000 metres | —N/a | | | | 15:53.27 | 13 |
| Elise Berings | 100 metres hurdles | —N/a | | 12.94 | 9 | did not advance | |
| Hanne Claes | 400 metres hurdles | —N/a | | 55.75 | 9 Q | 55.75 | 4 |
| Justien Grillet | 400 metres hurdles | 56.94 | 8 Q | 57.40 | 21 | did not advance | |
| Margo van Puyvelde | 400 metres hurdles | 56.70 | 6 Q | did not start | | did not advance | |
| Cynthia Bolingo Mbongo; Hanne Claes; Manon Depuydt*; Justien Grillet; Camille Laus; Margo van Puyvelde* | 4 × 400 metres relay | 3:30.62 | 5 Q | —N/a | | 3:27.69 NR | 4 |

* – Did not run in either the heats or the finals

Field events

| Athletes | Event | Qualification | | Final | |
| Athletes | Event | Distance | Position | Distance | Position |
|---|---|---|---|---|---|
| Claire Orcel | High jump | 1.81 | 23 | did not advance | |

Combined events – Heptathlon

| Athlete | Event | 100H | HJ | SP | 200 m | LJ | JT | 800 m | Final | Rank |
|---|---|---|---|---|---|---|---|---|---|---|
| Hanne Maudens | Result | 14.04 | 1.73 | 12.90 | 24.10 PB | 6.42 | 38.40 | 2:12.41 | 6104 | 10 |
| Hanne Maudens | Points | 973 | 891 | 721 | 971 | 981 | 637 | 930 | 6104 | 10 |
| Nafissatou Thiam | Result | 13.69 | 1.91 | 15.35 PB | 24.81 | 6.60 | 57.91 CB | 2:19.35 | 6816 WL | 1st place, gold medalist(s) |
| Nafissatou Thiam | Points | 1023 | 1119 | 884 | 904 | 1040 | 1014 | 832 | 6816 WL | 1st place, gold medalist(s) |
| Noor Vidts | Result | 14.08 SB | 1.79 SB | 11.83 | 24.80 | 6.04 | 24.81 | 2:16.69 | 5598 | 20 |
| Noor Vidts | Points | 967 | 966 | 650 | 905 | 862 | 379 | 869 | 5598 | 20 |
