= 2023 Mediterranean Athletics U23 Indoor Championships – Results =

These are the full results of the 2023 Mediterranean Athletics U23 Indoor Championships in Valencia, Spain on 22 January 2023 at the Velódromo Luis Puig.

== Results ==
Men's 60m
Place	Athlete	Country	Time
1st place, gold medalist(s)	William Aguessy	France	6.71
2nd place, silver medalist(s)	Edhem Vikalo	Bosnia and Herzegovina	6.73
3rd place, bronze medalist(s)	Matteo Melluzzo	Italy	6.74
4	Antoine Thoraval	France	6.75
5	Guillem Crespi	Spain	6.77
6	Orestis Chaidas	Greece	6.87
7	Roko Farkaš	Croatia	6.88
8	Anej Čurin Prapotnik	Slovenia	7.86

Men's 60m Round 1
Place	Athlete	Country	Time	Heat
1	Edhem Vikalo	Bosnia and Herzegovina	6.76	2
2	Anej Čurin Prapotnik	Slovenia	6.78	1
3	William Aguessy	France	6.81	1
4	Guillem Crespi	Spain	6.81	1
5	Matteo Melluzzo	Italy	6.82	1
6	Antoine Thoraval	France	6.85	2
7	Roko Farkaš	Croatia	6.89	2
8	Orestis Chaidas	Greece	6.92	2
9	Jose Luis Jimenez Cabello	Spain	6.92	2
10	Igor Oliveira	Portugal	7.03	1

Men's 400m
Place	Athlete	Country	Time
1st place, gold medalist(s)	Markel Fernández	Spain	46.99
2nd place, silver medalist(s)	Jakov Vukovic	Croatia	47.55
3rd place, bronze medalist(s)	Lorenzo Benati	Italy	47.71
4	Ibai Serrano	Spain	47.72
5	Ericsson Tavares	Portugal	48.11
6	Rodrigo Caetano	Portugal	49.15

Men's 400m Round 1
Place	Athlete	Country	Time	Heat
1	Lorenzo Benati	Italy	47.64	1
2	Ibai Serrano	Spain	47.87	1
3	Markel Fernández	Spain	47.88	2
4	Ericsson Tavares	Portugal	47.99	1
5	Jakov Vukovic	Croatia	48.17	2
6	Rodrigo Caetano	Portugal	49.19	2
7	Marc Anthony Ibrahim	Lebanon	50.15	2
8	Abdosalam Abosheekah	Libya	52.86	1

Men's 800m
Place	Athlete	Country	Time
1st place, gold medalist(s)	Yanis Meziane	France	1:51.91
2nd place, silver medalist(s)	David Carranza	Spain	1:52.79
3rd place, bronze medalist(s)	Paul Anselmini	France	1:52.84
4	David Barroso	Spain	1:52.89
5	Francesco Pernici	Italy	1:53.13
6	David Garcia	Portugal	1:53.67
7	Georgios Matzaridis	Greece	1:54.39

Men's 1500m
Place	Athlete	Country	Time
1st place, gold medalist(s)	Mohamed Attaoui	Spain	3:53.89
2nd place, silver medalist(s)	Flavien Szot	France	3:54.16
3rd place, bronze medalist(s)	Thomas Piquart	France	3:54.53
4	Masresha Costa	Italy	3:56.95
5	Nino Jambrešić	Croatia	3:57.72
6	Petros Papaioannou	Greece	3:59.89

Men's 60mH
Place	Athlete	Country	Time
1st place, gold medalist(s)	Christos-Panagiotis Roumtsios	Greece	7.90
2nd place, silver medalist(s)	Kenny Fletcher	France	7.93
3rd place, bronze medalist(s)	Mario Revenga	Spain	7.93
4	Lukas Cik	Croatia	8.15
5	Ioannis Kamarinos	Greece	8.17
6	Widy Zahana-Oni	France	8.26
7	Pablo Roelas	Spain	8.33
	Sisínio Ambriz	Portugal	DQ

Men's 60mH Round 1
Place	Athlete	Country	Time	Heat
1	Kenny Fletcher	France	7.94	1
2	Mario Revenga	Spain	8.02	1
3	Ioannis Kamarinos	Greece	8.02	1
4	Sisínio Ambriz	Portugal	8.03	2
5	Widy Zahana-Oni	France	8.05	2
6	Christos-Panagiotis Roumtsios	Greece	8.10	2
7	Pablo Roelas	Spain	8.22	2
8	Lukas Cik	Croatia	8.27	2
	Serhat Bulut	Turkey	DQ	1

Men's High Jump
Place	Athlete	Country	Mark
1st place, gold medalist(s)	Edoardo Stronati	Italy	2.17 m
2nd place, silver medalist(s)	Jason Bayindoula	France	2.14 m
3rd place, bronze medalist(s)	Paul Metayer	France	2.08 m
4	Kyriakos Pampaka	Cyprus	2.02 m

Men's Triple Jump
Place	Athlete	Country	Mark
1st place, gold medalist(s)	Thomas Martinez	France	15.73 m
2nd place, silver medalist(s)	Federico Lorenzo Bruno	Italy	15.70 m
3rd place, bronze medalist(s)	Batuhan Çakır	Turkey	15.22 m

Men's Shot Put
Place	Athlete	Country	Mark
1st place, gold medalist(s)	Miguel Gómez	Spain	18.77 m
2nd place, silver medalist(s)	Riccardo Ferrara	Italy	18.75 m
3rd place, bronze medalist(s)	Stephen Mailagi	France	17.96 m
4	Andre Muller	Spain	16.59 m
5	Athanasios Annivas Oikonomou	Greece	16.08 m

Women's 60m
Place	Athlete	Country	Time
1st place, gold medalist(s)	Polyniki Emmanouilidou	Greece	7.37
2nd place, silver medalist(s)	Hillary Gode	France	7.42
3rd place, bronze medalist(s)	Hope Eghonghon Esekheigbe	Italy	7.43
4	Chloé Galet	France	7.48
5	Alessandra Gasparelli	San Marino	7.53
6	Simay Özçiftçi	Turkey	7.56
7	Elena Guiu	Spain	7.56
8	Beatriz Andrade	Portugal	7.62

Women's 60m Round 1
Place	Athlete	Country	Time	Heat
1	Polyniki Emmanouilidou	Greece	7.39	2
2	Chloé Galet	France	7.46	2
3	Hope Eghonghon Esekheigbe	Italy	7.47	1
4	Elena Guiu	Spain	7.48	2
5	Hillary Gode	France	7.54	1
6	Simay Özçiftçi	Turkey	7.56	1
7	Alessandra Gasparelli	San Marino	7.57	2
8	Beatriz Andrade	Portugal	7.60	1
9	Íris Silva	Portugal	7.64	2
10	Haya Kobrosly	Lebanon	8.09	1
11	Charlotte Afriat	Monaco	8.19	2

Women's 400m
Place	Athlete	Country	Time
1st place, gold medalist(s)	Veronika Drljacic	Croatia	54.16
2nd place, silver medalist(s)	Berta Segura	Spain	54.88
3rd place, bronze medalist(s)	Laura Elena Rami	Italy	55.11
4	Pauline Toriel	France	55.17
5	Ana Garitaonandia	Spain	55.36
6	Ana Rus	Slovenia	56.45

Women's 800m
Place	Athlete	Country	Time
1st place, gold medalist(s)	Nina Vuković	Croatia	2:09.09
2nd place, silver medalist(s)	Julia Cherot	France	2:09.17
3rd place, bronze medalist(s)	Sofia Bella	Italy	2:10.64
4	Jarraz el Ghaita	Spain	2:11.44

Women's 1500m
Place	Athlete	Country	Time
1st place, gold medalist(s)	Klara Andrijašević	Croatia	4:24.07
2nd place, silver medalist(s)	Mireya Arnedillo	Spain	4:24.27
3rd place, bronze medalist(s)	María González	Spain	4:24.93
4	Matilde Prati	Italy	4:31.04
5	Lea Haler	Slovenia	4:35.24
6	Rihab Dhahri	Tunisia	4:55.06

Women's 60mH
Place	Athlete	Country	Time
1st place, gold medalist(s)	Paula Blanquer	Spain	8.16
2nd place, silver medalist(s)	Claudia Villalante	Spain	8.24
3rd place, bronze medalist(s)	Lea Vendôme	France	8.28
4	Lucija Grd	Croatia	8.32
5	Luna Goureau	France	8.44
6	Elena Carraro	Italy	8.47
7	Cansu Nimet Sayin	Turkey	8.62
8	Klara Koščak	Croatia	8.68

Women's 60mH Round 1
Place	Athlete	Country	Time	Heat
1	Paula Blanquer	Spain	8.21	2
2	Claudia Villalante	Spain	8.26	2
3	Lucija Grd	Croatia	8.28	2
4	Luna Goureau	France	8.30	2
5	Klara Koščak	Croatia	8.37	1
6	Lea Vendôme	France	8.37	1
7	Elena Carraro	Italy	8.40	1
8	Cansu Nimet Sayin	Turkey	8.42	1
9	Mariana Bento	Portugal	8.61	1

Women's Pole Vault
Place	Athlete	Country	Mark
1st place, gold medalist(s)	Elina Giallurachis	France	4.35 m
2nd place, silver medalist(s)	Marie-Julie Bonnin	France	4.35 m
3rd place, bronze medalist(s)	Giulia Valletti Borgnini	Italy	4.15 m
4	Ana Chacón	Spain	4.10 m
5	Clara Fernández	Spain	3.80 m

Women's Long Jump
Place	Athlete	Country	Mark
1st place, gold medalist(s)	Larissa Iapichino	Italy	6.45 m
2nd place, silver medalist(s)	Tessy Ebosele	Spain	6.24 m
3rd place, bronze medalist(s)	Evelyn Yankey	Spain	6.18 m
4	Alice Chivet	France	6.00 m
5	Spyridoula Karydi	Greece	5.95 m
