= Belgium at the 2014 European Athletics Championships =

- WA code: BEL
- National federation: Royal Belgian Athletics League
- Website: www.belgian-athletics.be

in Zürich
- Competitors: 35
- Medals: Gold 0 Silver 0 Bronze 1 Total 1

European Athletics Championships appearances (overview)
- 1934; 1938; 1946; 1950; 1954; 1958; 1962; 1966; 1969; 1971; 1974; 1978; 1982; 1986; 1990; 1994; 1998; 2002; 2006; 2010; 2012; 2014; 2016; 2018; 2022; 2024; 2026

Belgium competed at the 2014 European Athletics Championships in Zürich, Switzerland, between 12 and 17 August 2014. A delegation of 35 athletes were sent to represent the country.

== Medals ==
Medal	Name	Event	Date
Bronze	Nafissatou Thiam	Women's heptathlon	15 August

== Results ==
Men

Track & road events

Athlete	Event	Heat		Semifinal		Final	
Athlete	Event	Result	Rank	Result	Rank	Result	Rank
Jonathan Borlée	400 m	45.77	3 Q	45.38	2 Q	DNS	
Kevin Borlée	400 m	45.72	2 Q	46.15	3	did not advance	
Julien Watrin	400 m	46.31	5	did not advance			
Jan Van Den Broeck	800 m	1:52.09	9	—N/a		did not advance	
Pieter-Jan Hannes	1500 m	3:40.34	9	—N/a		did not advance	
Isaac Kimeli	1500 m	3:41.96	9	—N/a		did not advance	
Tarek Moukrime	1500 m	3:39.50	4 Q	—N/a		3:47.33	8
Bashir Abdi	5000 m	—N/a				14:24.73	16
Soufiane Bouchikhi	5000 m	—N/a				14:17.43	15
Bashir Abdi	10,000 m	—N/a				28:13.61	5
Mats Lunders	10,000 m	—N/a				29:12.86	13
Koen Naert	10,000 m	—N/a				29:04.87	11
Adrien Deghelt	110 m hurdles	14.33	8	did not advance			
Michaël Bultheel	400 m hurdles	50.18	2 Q	49.62	5	did not advance	
Tim Rummens	400 m hurdles	50.80	5	did not advance			
Stef Vanhaeren	400 m hurdles	49.98	5 q	50.63	6	did not advance	
Kevin Borlée; Michaël Bultheel; Antoine Gillet^{2} Stef Vanhaeren^{2} Julien Watrin	4 × 400 m relay	3:03.83	4 q	—N/a		3:02.60	6
Abdelhadi El Hachimi	Marathon	—N/a				2:16:35	14

^{1}only the heats ^{2}only the final

Field Events

Athlete	Event	Qualification		Final	
Athlete	Event	Distance	Rank	Distance	Rank
Arnaud Art	Pole vault	5.30	=16	did not advance	
Mathias Broothaerts	Long jump	7.48	25	did not advance	
Philip Milanov	Discus throw	59.85	20	did not advance	

Combined events – Decathlon

Athlete	Event	100 m	LJ	SP	HJ	400 m	110H	DT	PV	JT	1500 m	Final	Rank
Niels Pittomvils	Result	11.23 PB	6.88	13.33	1.98 SB	50.42	14.63	44.74	5.10 SB	57.76 SB	4:38.57	7852	14
Niels Pittomvils	Points	810	785	687	785	795	895	761	941	704	689	7852	14
Thomas Van der Plaetsen	Result	11.25	7.54	14.12	2.10 SB	50.41	14.85	41.92	5.20	60.95	4:48.18	8105	10
Thomas Van der Plaetsen	Points	806	945	736	896	796	868	704	972	752	630	8105	10

Women

Track & road events

Athlete	Event	Heat		Semifinal		Final	
Athlete	Event	Result	Rank	Result	Rank	Result	Rank
Almensch Belete	10,000 m	—N/a				33:03.87	15
Eline Berings	100 m hurdles	13.00	3 Q	12.95	5 q	13.24	8
Anne Zagré	100 m hurdles	12.76	1 Q	12.83 SB	2 Q	12.89	4
Hanne Claes	400 m hurdles	1:00.20	5	did not advance			
Axelle Dauwens	400 m hurdles	56.15	2 Q	55.63 PB	3 Q	56.29	6
Olivia Borlée; Kimberley Efonye; Justien Grillet; Laetitia Libert	4 × 400 m relay	3:32.22	4 q	—N/a		3:31.82	8

Combined events – Heptathlon

Athlete	Event	100H	HJ	SP	200 m	LJ	JT	800 m	Final	Rank
Nafissatou Thiam	Result	14.05	1.98 =WHB	14.29	25.19	6.18	49.69	2:20.79 PB	6423	3rd place, bronze medalist(s)
Nafissatou Thiam	Points	971	1198	813	869	905	854	813	6423	3rd place, bronze medalist(s)
