= 2026 European Athletics Championships – Mixed 4 × 100 metres relay =

Mixed 4 × 100 metres relay at the 2026 European Athletics Championships
- Venue: Alexander Stadium
- Location: Birmingham, United Kingdom
- Dates: 16 August 2026
- Nations: 8
- Winning time: 39.97 AR

Medalists
gold medal	Jeremiah Azu; Dina Asher-Smith; Zharnel Hughes; Amy Hunt	Great Britain
silver medal	Kevin Kranz; Rebekka Haase; Heiko Gussmann; Gina Lückenkemper	Germany
bronze medal	Guillem Crespí; María Isabel Pérez; Andoni Calbano; Jaël Bestué	Spain

The mixed 4 × 100 metres relay at the 2026 European Athletics Championships took place at the Alexander Stadium in Birmingham, United Kingdom, on 16 August 2026. This was the first time the event was held at the European Championships.

== Background ==
Records before the 2026 European Athletics Championships
Record	Athlete (nation)	Time	Location	Date
World record	Jamaica (Ackeem Blake, Tina Clayton, Kadrian Goldson, Tia Clayton)	39.62	Gaborone, Botswana	3 May 2026
World leading	Jamaica (Ackeem Blake, Tina Clayton, Kadrian Goldson, Tia Clayton)	39.62	Gaborone, Botswana	3 May 2026
European record	Germany (Yannick Wolf, Sophia Junk, Heiko Gussmann, Sina Kammerschmitt)	40.15	Gaborone, Botswana	2 May 2026
European leading	Germany (Yannick Wolf, Sophia Junk, Heiko Gussmann, Sina Kammerschmitt)	40.15	Gaborone, Botswana	2 May 2026
Championship record	Vacant	—	—	—

== Qualification ==
For the mixed 4 × 100 metres relay, the qualification period is from 1 January 2025 to 26 July 2026. The qualification procedure will be based on the aggregate of the two fastest times achieved by national teams in the qualification period. For being ranked, the results of relay races shall be valid only on condition that they are part of a competition staged in compliance with World Athletics Rules (and included into World Athletics Global Calendar) and that at least 2 international teams, representing at least 2 countries compete in the race. A total of 8 national teams can compete in the event. Host nation Great Britain has the right to be represented with one national team in the event. If they wish to participate and are not qualified as indicated above, the number of national teams to qualify will be reduced to 7.

Qualification standings per 31 July 2026
QP	Country	Athletes	Status	Accumulated times	Result 1	Result 2
1	Great Britain & N.I.		Allocated to Host Country			
2	Germany		Qualified by European Ranking	80.67	40.15	40.52
3	Netherlands		Qualified by European Ranking	81.16	40.20	40.96
4	Spain		Qualified by European Ranking	81.56	40.51	41.05
5	Italy		Qualified by European Ranking	81.65	40.69	40.96
6	Switzerland		Qualified by European Ranking	82.03	41.01	41.02
7	Belgium		Qualified by European Ranking	82.15	40.99	41.16
8	Portugal		Qualified by European Ranking	82.21	40.76	41.45

== Schedule ==
Date	Time	Round
16 August 2026	20:35	Final

All times are local times (UTC+1)

== Results ==
=== Final ===
The final was held on 16 August 2026, at 20:35 in the evening.

Place	Lane	Nation	Athletes	Time	Notes
1st place, gold medalist(s)	4	Great Britain & N.I.	Jeremiah Azu, Dina Asher-Smith, Zharnel Hughes, Amy Hunt	39.97	AR
2nd place, silver medalist(s)	8	Germany	Kevin Kranz, Rebekka Haase, Heiko Gussmann, Gina Lückenkemper	40.11	NR
3rd place, bronze medalist(s)	5	Spain	Guillem Crespí, María Isabel Pérez, Andoni Calbano, Jaël Bestué	40.42	NR
4	2	Switzerland	Daryl Bachmann, Géraldine di Tizio-Frey, William Reais, Fabienne Hoenke	40.87	NR
5	9	Portugal	Gabriel Maia, Tatjana Pinto, Delvis Santos, Arialis Gandulla	40.90	
	6	Italy	Eduardo Longobardi, Vittoria Fontana, Eseosa Fostine Desalu, Alice Pagliarini	DNF	
	7	Netherlands	Jaimie Omalla, Britt de Blaauw, Xavi Mo-Ajok, Fenna Achterberg	DNF	
	3	Belgium	Ibrahim Camara, Janie de Naeyer, Cédric Verschueren, Rani Vincke	DQ	TR24.7
