= 2023 European Athletics U23 Championships – Men's 4 × 100 metres relay =

Men's 4 × 100 metres relay at the 2023 European Athletics U23 Championships
- Venue: Leppävaara Stadium
- Location: Espoo, Finland
- Dates: 15 July
- Competitors: 85 from 20 nations
- Winning time: 38.92

Medalists
gold medal	Eric Marek; Matteo Melluzzo; Marco Ricci; Junior Tardioli; Angelo Ulisse	Italy
silver medal	Jordan Jalce; Hugo Cerra; Mohammed Badru; Pablo Matéo; Edmilson Varela; Aurélien Larue	France
bronze medal	Igor Bogaczyński; Adam Łukomski; Łukasz Żok; Patryk Krupa; Jakub Lempach; Anton Bachorski	Poland

The men's 4 × 100 metres relay event at the 2023 European Athletics U23 Championships was held in Espoo, Finland, at Leppävaara Stadium on 15 July.

== Records ==
Prior to the competition, the records were as follows:

European U23 record	Germany (GER)	38.70	Tallinn, Estonia	11 July 2021
Championship U23 record	Germany (GER)	38.70	Tallinn, Estonia	11 July 2021

== Results ==
=== Heats ===
First 2 in each heat (Q) and the next 2 fastest (q) advance to the final.

==== Heat 1 ====
Place	Nation	Athletes	Time	Notes
1	Greece	Vasilios Mirianthopoulos, Ioannis Kariofyllis, Ioannis Granitsiotis, Nikolaos Panagiotopoulos	39.31	Q, NU23R
2	Belgium	Olivier Lifrange, Emiel Botterman, Timber Huysmans, Rendel Vermeulen	39.77	Q, SB
3	Austria	Klaus Grünbart, Lukas Pullnig, Stephan Pacher, Noel Waroschitz	40.12	NU23R
4	Switzerland	Lucien Kern, Nick Stalder, Simon Graf, Joe Martin	40.35	SB
5	Slovenia	Timotej Cvelbar, Jernej Gumilar, Andrej Skočir, Tan Černigoj	40.40	SB
—	Germany	Felix Frühn, James Adebola, Eddie Reddemann, Simon Wulff	DNF	
—	Sweden	Thomas Jones, Linus Pihl, Rafael Tejada de Leon, Milo Wahlgren	DNF	

==== Heat 2 ====
Place	Nation	Athletes	Time	Notes
1	Netherlands	Cédric Fini, Raphael Bouju, Nsikak Ekpo, Xavi Mo-Ajok	38.88	Q, EU23L
2	Poland	Jakub Lempach, Adam Łukomski, Łukasz Żok, Anton Bachórski	39.00	Q, SB
3	Italy	Eric Marek, Matteo Melluzzo, Angelo Ulisse, Junior Tardioli	39.23	q, SB
4	Finland	Eino Vuori, Valtteri Louko, Lassi Kaukonen, Arttu Peltola	39.84	q, SB
5	Ukraine	Vladyslav Yemets, Andrii Vasyliev, Oleksandr Sosnowenko, Ilya Popov	40.01	SB
6	Norway	August Hemstad, Jacob Vaula, Jonas Berggård Skåden, Kenny Emi Tijani-Ajayi	40.62	SB
7	Turkey	Umut Uysal, Oğuz Uyar, Volkan Erdoğan, Anthony Smith	41.25	SB

==== Heat 3 ====
Place	Nation	Athletes	Time	Notes
1	Ireland	Gabriel Kehinde, Runo Ayavoro, Colin Doyle, Israel Olatunde	39.52	Q, NU23R
2	France	Edmilson Varela, Hugo Cerra, Mohammed Badru, Aurélien Larue	39.78	Q, SB
3	Spain	Pablo Arranz, Guillem Crespí, Miguel Gasch, Jose Luis Jimenez Cabello	39.88	SB
4	Denmark	Sofus Lassen, Mikkel Linnemand Johansson, Victor Kiplagat Kondrup, Tazana Kamanga-Dyrbak	40.38	SB
5	Israel	Priel Rada, Thomas Dubnov-Raz, Aviv Koffler, Amit Rutman	40.44	SB
—	Czech Republic	Adam Raška, Ondřej Macík, Eduard Kubelík, Jan Václav Ondráček	DNF	

=== Final ===
Place	Nation	Athletes	Time	Notes
1st place, gold medalist(s)	Eric Marek, Matteo Melluzzo, Marco Ricci, Junior Tardioli	Italy	38.92	NU23R
2nd place, silver medalist(s)	Jordan Jalce, Hugo Cerra, Mohammed Badru, Pablo Matéo	France	38.92	SB
3rd place, bronze medalist(s)	Igor Bogaczyński, Adam Łukomski, Łukasz Żok, Patryk Krupa	Poland	39.06	
4	Vasilios Mirianthopoulos, Ioannis Kariofyllis, Ioannis Granitsiotis, Nikolaos Panagiotopoulos	Greece	39.09	NU23R
5	Gabriel Kehinde, Runo Ayavoro, Colin Doyle, Israel Olatunde	Ireland	39.51	NU23R
—	Eino Vuori, Valtteri Louko, Lassi Kaukonen, Arttu Peltola	Finland	DNF	
—	Olivier Lifrange, Emiel Botterman, Timber Huysmans, Rendel Vermeulen	Belgium	DNF	
—	Cédric Fini, Raphael Bouju, Nsikak Ekpo, Xavi Mo-Ajok	Netherlands	DNF	
