= Belgium at the 2002 European Athletics Championships =

- WA code: BEL
- National federation: Royal Belgian Athletics League
- Website: www.belgian-athletics.be

in Zürich
- Medals: Gold 0 Silver 2 Bronze 0 Total 2

European Athletics Championships appearances (overview)
- 1934; 1938; 1946; 1950; 1954; 1958; 1962; 1966; 1969; 1971; 1974; 1978; 1982; 1986; 1990; 1994; 1998; 2002; 2006; 2010; 2012; 2014; 2016; 2018; 2022; 2024; 2026

Belgium was represented by 18 athletes (10 male/8 female) and 1 reserve at the 2002 European Athletics Championships held in Munich, Germany, from 6 August to 11 August 2002.

== Medals ==
Medal	Name	Event	Date
Silver	Kim Gevaert	Women's 100 metres	7 August
Silver	Kim Gevaert	Women's 200 metres	9 August

== Participants ==
=== Men ===
==== Track and road events ====
Event	Athletes	Heats		Semifinal		Final	
Event	Athletes	Result	Rank	Result	Rank	Result	Rank
400 m	Cédric Van Branteghem	46.23	2 Q	45.94 PB	2 Q	45.95	6
800 m	Tom Omey	1:48.27	5	did not advance			
800 m	Joeri Jansen	1:47.71	3 Q	1:48.62	4	did not advance	
5000 m	Tom Compernolle	—N/a				13:57.46	13
Marathon	Guy Fays	—N/a				DNF	
Marathon	Gino Van Heyte	—N/a				2:16:04	15
110 m hurdles	Jonathan N’Senga	13.88	5	did not advance			

==== Field events ====
Event	Athletes	Qualification		Final	
Event	Athletes	Result	Rank	Result	Rank
Pole Vault	Thibaut Duval	NM		did not advance	
Triple jump	Michael Velter	16.47	13	did not advance	
Discus throw	Jo Van Daele	62.71	11 Q	61.07	10

=== Women ===
==== Track and road events ====
Event	Athletes	Heats		Semifinal		Final	
Event	Athletes	Result	Rank	Result	Rank	Result	Rank
100 m	Kim Gevaert	11.19	1 Q	11.27	1 Q	11.22	2nd place, silver medalist(s)
200 m	Kim Gevaert	22.97	1 Q	22.73	1 Q	22.53	2nd place, silver medalist(s)
800 m	Sandra Stals	2:03.13	3 Q	2:02.44	5	did not advance	
1500 m	Veerle Dejaeghere	4:10.88	7	—N/a		did not advance	
Marathon	Marleen Renders	—N/a				DNF	
400 m hurdles	Ann Mercken	57.02	4	did not advance			
4 × 100 m relay	Nancy Callaerts; Katleen De Caluwé; Kim Gevaert; Elodie Ouedraogo	43.57 NR	3 q	—N/a		43.22 NR	4
