= 2023 European Athletics U23 Championships – Men's 100 metres =

Men's 100 metres at the 2023 European Athletics U23 Championships
- Venue: Leppävaara Stadium
- Location: Espoo, Finland
- Dates: 13 July (heats & semi-finals); 14 July (final)
- Competitors: 30 from 18 nations
- Winning time: 10.05

Medalists
gold medal	Jeremiah Azu	Great Britain
silver medal	Raphael Bouju	Netherlands
bronze medal	Pablo Matéo	France

The men's 100 metres event at the 2023 European Athletics U23 Championships was held in Espoo, Finland, at Leppävaara Stadium on 13 and 14 July.

== Records ==
Prior to the competition, the records were as follows:

European U23 record	Christophe Lemaitre (FRA)	9.92	Albi, France	29 July 2011
Championship U23 record	Simeon Williamson (GBR)	10.10	Debrecen, Hungary	13 July 2007

== Results ==
=== Heats ===
First 3 in each heat (Q) and the next 4 fastest (q) will qualify for the semi-finals.

==== Heat 1 ====
Place	Athlete	Nation	Time	Notes
1	Pablo Matéo	France	10.43	Q
2	Andrii Vasyliev	Ukraine	10.53	Q
3	Israel Olatunde	Ireland	10.55	Q
4	Anej Čurin Prapotnik	Slovenia	10.63	
5	Jacob Vaula	Norway	10.78	
6	Patrik Bundschu	Hungary	10.80	
7	Oğuz Uyar	Turkey	10.97	
8	Guillem Arderiu Vilanova	Andorra	11.22	
			Wind: (−1.9 m/s)	

==== Heat 2 ====
Place	Athlete	Nation	Time	Notes
1	Raphael Bouju	Netherlands	10.26	Q
2	Guillem Crespí	Spain	10.42	Q
3	Junior Tardioli	Italy	10.48	Q
4	Valtteri Louko	Finland	10.52	q
5	Felix Frühn	Germany	10.53	
6	Noel Waroschitz	Austria	10.66	
7	Oliver Swinney	Ireland	10.66	
			Wind: (+0.2 m/s)	

==== Heat 3 ====
Place	Athlete	Nation	Time	Notes
1	Matteo Melluzzo	Italy	10.38	Q
2	Jeremiah Azu	Great Britain	10.44	Q
3	Niilo Mustalahti	Finland	10.63	Q
4	Chidiera Onuoha	Germany	10.70	
5	Daniljo Vriendwijk	Netherlands	10.75	
6	Beppe Grillo	Malta	10.91	
—	Robert McDonnell	Ireland	DNS	
			Wind: (+0.7 m/s)	

==== Heat 4 ====
Place	Athlete	Nation	Time	Notes
1	Nsikak Ekpo	Netherlands	10.39	Q
2	Eric Marek	Italy	10.39	Q
3	Robin Ganter	Germany	10.40	Q
4	Adam Łukomski	Poland	10.43	q
5	Eino Vuori	Finland	10.44	q, SB
6	Tazana Kamanga-Dyrbak	Denmark	10.44	q
7	Dominik Illovszky	Hungary	10.56	
8	Umut Uysal	Turkey	10.69	
			Wind: (−0.3 m/s)	

=== Semi-finals ===
First 3 in each heat (Q) and the next 2 fastest (q) will qualify for the final.

==== Heat 1 ====
Place	Athlete	Nation	Time	Notes
1	Jeremiah Azu	Great Britain	10.04	Q, CR
2	Nsikak Ekpo	Netherlands	10.28	Q, PB
3	Guillem Crespí	Spain	10.28	Q, PB
4	Israel Olatunde	Ireland	10.32	q, SB
5	Junior Tardioli	Italy	10.34	
6	Tazana Kamanga-Dyrbak	Denmark	10.35	
7	Matteo Melluzzo	Italy	10.36	=SB
8	Eino Vuori	Finland	10.44	
			Wind: (+1.0 m/s)	

==== Heat 1 ====
Place	Athlete	Nation	Time	Notes
1	Raphael Bouju	Netherlands	10.01	Q
2	Pablo Matéo	France	10.10	Q
3	Andrii Vasyliev	Ukraine	10.24	Q
4	Robin Ganter	Germany	10.25	q
5	Adam Łukomski	Poland	10.35	
6	Valtteri Louko	Finland	10.38	
7	Eric Marek	Italy	10.43	
—	Niilo Mustalahti	Finland	DNS	
			Wind: (+2.5 m/s)	

=== Final ===
Place	Lane	Athlete	Nation	Time	Notes
1st place, gold medalist(s)	6	Jeremiah Azu	Great Britain	10.05	
2nd place, silver medalist(s)	5	Raphael Bouju	Netherlands	10.17	
3rd place, bronze medalist(s)	4	Pablo Matéo	France	10.18	
4	1	Robin Ganter	Germany	10.31	
5	7	Guillem Crespí	Spain	10.34	
6	3	Nsikak Ekpo	Netherlands	10.39	
7	2	Andrii Vasyliev	Ukraine	10.41	
8	8	Israel Olatunde	Ireland	10.44	
				Wind: (+2.1 m/s)	
