= Belgium at the 2016 European Athletics Championships =

- WA code: BEL
- National federation: Royal Belgian Athletics League
- Website: www.belgian-athletics.be

in Amsterdam
- Competitors: 30 (19 men and 11 women) in 21 events
- Medals Ranked 10th: Gold 2 Silver 1 Bronze 0 Total 3

European Athletics Championships appearances (overview)
- 1934; 1938; 1946; 1950; 1954; 1958; 1962; 1966; 1969; 1971; 1974; 1978; 1982; 1986; 1990; 1994; 1998; 2002; 2006; 2010; 2012; 2014; 2016; 2018; 2022; 2024; 2026

Belgium competed at the 2016 European Athletics Championships in Amsterdam, Netherlands, between 6 and 10 July 2016.

== Medals ==
Medal	Name	Event	Date
Gold	Thomas van der Plaetsen	Men's decathlon	7 July
Gold	Jonathan Borlee Kévin Borlee Julien Watrin Dylan Borlée Robin Vanderbemden	Men's 4 × 400 m relay	10 July
Silver	Philip Milanov	Men's Discus throw	9 July

== Results ==
Men

Track & road events

Athlete	Event	Heat		Semifinal		Final	
Athlete	Event	Result	Rank	Result	Rank	Result	Rank
Robin Vanderbemden	200 m	21.17	16	Did not advance			
Jonathan Borlée	400 m	47.45	18	Did not advance			
Kevin Borlée	400 m	—N/a		45.26	4 Q	45.60	4
Julien Watrin	400 m	46.10	2 Q	45.76	10	Did not advance	
Aaron Botterman	800 m	1:48.35	7 q	—N/a		1:49.92	14
Peter Callahan	1500 m	3:41.75	10	—N/a		Did not advance	
Ismael Debjani	1500 m	3:42.62	13 Q	—N/a		3:49.12	11
Isaac Kimeli	1500 m	3:41.25	9 q	—N/a		3:47.92	9
Soufiane Bouchikhi	10,000 m	—N/a				29:03.74	8
Michaël Bultheel	400 m hurdles	—N/a		49.72	15	Did not advance	
Arnaud Ghislain	400 m hurdles	53.65	26	Did not advance			
Jeroen D'Hoedt	3000 m steeplechase	8:42.75	17	—N/a		Did not advance	
Dylan Borlée; Jonathan Borlée; Kevin Borlée (only in final); Robin Vanderbemden; Julien Watrin	4 × 400 m relay	3:03.15 SB	4 Q	—N/a		3:01.10 EL	1st place, gold medalist(s)
Soufiane Bouchikhi	Half marathon	—N/a				1:05:31	28

Field Events

Athlete	Event	Qualification		Final	
Athlete	Event	Distance	Rank	Distance	Rank
Arnaud Art	Pole vault	5.50	11 q	5.30	=11
Ben Broeders	Pole vault	5.35	=12 q	5.50	=4
Philip Milanov	Discus throw	64.53	7 Q	65.71	2nd place, silver medalist(s)

Combined events – Decathlon

Athlete	Event	100 m	LJ	SP	HJ	400 m	110H	DT	PV	JT	1500 m	Final	Rank
Niels Pittomvils	Result	11.18	7.15	13.79	1.98	50.01 SB	DNF	40.42	DNS			DNF	
Niels Pittomvils	Points	821	850	715	785	814	—	673	—			DNF	
Hans van Alphen	Result	11.39	7.17	15.62 SB	1.98	51.42	DNS					DNF	
Hans van Alphen	Points	776	854	828	785	750	—					DNF	
Thomas van der Plaetsen	Result	11.23	7.64	13.17	2.10 SB	50.50	14.64	44.32	5.40	57.23	4:37.84	8218	1st place, gold medalist(s)
Thomas van der Plaetsen	Points	810	970	678	896	792	894	753	1035	696	694	8218	1st place, gold medalist(s)

Women

Track & road events

Athlete	Event	Heat		Semifinal		Final	
Athlete	Event	Result	Rank	Result	Rank	Result	Rank
Olivia Borlée	200 m	23.64	18	Did not advance			
Renée Eykens	800 m	2:02.76	6 q	2:02.38	14	Did not advance	
Louise Carton	5000 m	—N/a				15:42.79	7
Almensch Belete	10,000 m	—N/a				DNF	
Anne Zagré	100 m hurdles	13.12	8 Q	12.89 SB	3 q	12.97	5
Axelle Dauwens	400 m hurdles	—N/a		56.62	13	Did not advance	
Nenah de Coninck	400 m hurdles	57.45	9 q	57.63	21	Did not advance	

Field Events

Athlete	Event	Qualification		Final	
Athlete	Event	Distance	Rank	Distance	Rank
Nafissatou Thiam	High jump	1.89	5 q	1.93	4
Chloé Henry	Pole vault	4.00	24	Did not advance	
Fanny Smets	Pole vault	4.35	19	Did not advance	
Jolien Boumkwo	Shot put	16.66	14	Did not advance	
