= Belgium at the 1934 European Athletics Championships =

- WA code: BEL
- National federation: Royal Belgian Athletics League
- Website: www.belgian-athletics.be

in Turin
- Competitors: 3 (3 men) in 23 events
- Medals: Gold 0 Silver 0 Bronze 0 Total 0

European Athletics Championships appearances (overview)
- 1934; 1938; 1946; 1950; 1954; 1958; 1962; 1966; 1969; 1971; 1974; 1978; 1982; 1986; 1990; 1994; 1998; 2002; 2006; 2010; 2012; 2014; 2016; 2018; 2022; 2024; 2026

Belgium competed at the 1934 European Athletics Championships in Turin, Italy, between 7 and 9 September 1934.

== Results ==
Men

Track & road events

Athlete	Event	Heat		Semifinal		Final	
Athlete	Event	Result	Rank	Result	Rank	Result	Rank
René Geeraert	1500 m	4:01.2 CR	1 Q	—N/a		NT	–
Frans Vendersteen	Marathon	—N/a				Did not finish	

Combined events – Decathlon

Athlete	Event	100 m	LJ	SP	HJ	400 m	110H	DT	PV	JT	1500 m	Final	Rank
Maurice Boulanger	Result	12.0	6.28	10.81	1.60	53	18.4	28.90	3.40	46.46	4:33.0	5552 NR	9
Maurice Boulanger	Points											5552 NR	9
