= Andoni Calbano =

Spanish sprinter (born 2000)

Personal information
- Full name: Andoni Calbano Osinaga
- Nationality: Spanish
- Born: 11 December 2000 (age 25)

Sport
- Sport: Athletics
- Event: Sprint
- Club: Real Sociedad

Achievements and titles
- Personal bests: 60 m: 6.80 (2026); 100 m 10.29 (2025); 200 m: 20.41 (2025)
Medal record
Men's athletics
Representing Spain
European Championships
Bronze medal – third place	2026 Birmingham	4 × 100 m mixed

Andoni Calbano Osinaga (born 11 December 2000) is a Spanish sprinter. He won the Spanish Athletics Championships in 2026 over 200 metres.

== Career ==
From Bergara in the province of Gipuzkoa, in the Basque Country, Calbano became the fastest Basque athlete over 200 metres in 2023 with a run of 20.77 seconds in Anoeta. In doing so, he improved the mark of 20.89 set by the Bilbao athlete Luis Sarria in 1974 by twelve hundredths of a second. That year, he placed second over 200 metres at the 2023 Spanish Athletics Championships and also placed third over 200 metres at the 2024 Spanish Indoor Championships. That summer, he was part of the Real Sociedad 4 × 100 metres relay team which won the national title at the Spanish Championships.

Calbano set a new Euskadi indoor record in the 200 metres at the 2025 Spanish Indoor Championships in Madrid, with a time of 20.95 seconds. That summer, Calbano won the 200 metres title in a time of 20.41 seconds (+2.0) finishing ahead of Jaime Sancho at the senior Spanish Athletics Championships in Tarragona in August 2025, having previously lowered the Basque record to 20.56 seconds in the semi-finals. The time moved him to third on the Spanish all-time list behind only Bruno Hortelano and Pol Retamal.

Calbano placed second in the 200 metres with a time of 21.17 seconds at the 2026 Spanish Indoor Championships. He was selected as part of the Spanish team for the 2026 World Athletics Relays. On the opening day, he ran as a member of the mixed 4 × 100 m relay alongside Guillem Crespí, Maribel Pérez and Jaël Bestué as they ran a time of 40.51, setting the first national record in this event, qualifying for the final. He also ran in the men's 4 × 100 metres relay at the championships in Gaborone, Botswana.

Calbano competed alongside Spanish teammates Crespí, Perez and Bestue and won the bronze medal in the mixed 4 × 100 m at the 2026 European Athletics Championships in Birmingham, England, in August 2026. He also ran in the men's 4 × 100 metres relay at the championships.

== Personal life ==
A student of engineering, he supplemented his income by working as a waiter. He is a keen football fan, and of playing chess.
