= Janie De Naeyer =

Belgian sprinter (born 2001)

Personal information
- Nationality: Belgian
- Born: 17 August 2001 (age 25)
- Home town: Brasschaat, Belgium

Sport
- Country: Belgium
- Sport: Athletics
- Events: 60 metres, 100 metres, 200 metres
- Club: OEH & Antwerp Racing Team
- Coached by: Patrick Himschoot

Janie De Naeyer (born 17 August 2001) is a Belgian sprinter who represented Belgium at the 2024 Summer Olympics in Paris, France.

== Career ==
Both her parents being athletes, De Naeyer grew up around the track. Age 18 she belonged to Belgium's elite junior sprinters posting a best of 11.82s in the 100 metres. In late May 2019, De Naeyer was involved in a severe collision during a full sprint in training that resulted in a fractured tibia and emergency surgery. Rehabilitation took longer than expected and it would be 2023 before she returned to form.

=== 2023 ===
In July De Naeyer ran in both the heat and final of the women's 4 × 100 metres relay at the 2023 European Athletics U23 Championships in Espoo, Finland finishing fifth with the Belgian team.

=== 2024 ===
In May De Naeyer ran as part of the Belgian women's 4 × 100 m relay team in the repechage Olympic qualifying round at the 2024 World Relays Championships in Nassau, Bahamas that failed to qualify directly for the 2024 Summer Olympics. In June De Naeyer represented Belgium at the 2024 European Athletics Championships in Rome as a member of the Belgian women's 4 × 100 m relay team that qualified for the final. She was left out of the team in the heats but ran in the final where the Belgian team finished 6th. She represented Belgium at the 2024 Summer Olympics in Paris, France as a member of Belgium's women's 4 × 100 metres relay team that, having missed direct qualification at the World Relays Championships managed to qualify for the 2024 Summer Olympic Games via the World Athletics Rankings. The team was however disqualified in round 1 of the women's 4 × 100 metres relay when Elise Mehuys passed the baton to Delphine Nkansa outside the takeover zone.

=== 2025 ===
In May she ran in both the heats and the final as a member of the Belgian mixed 4 × 100 m relay team at the 2025 World Athletics Relays in the Guangdong Olympic Stadium in Guangzhou, China, finishing eight in the final. In June, she was a member of the winning BelgiAN women's 4 × 100 m relay team at the 2025 European Athletics Team Championships Second Division in Maribor that contributed to Belgium's promotion to the top division. In September 2025, she competed in the women's 4 × 100 metres at the 2025 World Championships in Tokyo, Japan, where the team was disqualified in the heats.

=== 2026 ===
She represented Belgium at the 2026 European Athletics Championships in Birmingham, United Kingdom in August as a member of the Belgian women's 4 × 100 m relay team that qualified for the final and finished 5th and as a member of the mixed 4 × 100 m relay team that was disqualified in the final when Cédric Verschueren passed the baton to Rani Vincke outside the takeover zone.

== Personal life ==
De Naeyer is the daughter of Belgian pole-vaulter Alan De Naeyer. She holds a Masters Degree in Obstetrics from the Artesis Plantijn University College of Antwerp

== Personal bests ==
Outdoor

- 100 metres – 11.29 (+1.1 m/s Kessel-Lo 2026)
- 200 metres – 23.24 (+0.2 m/s Oordegem 2026)

Indoor

- 60 metres – 7.32 (Ghent 2026)
- 200 metres – 25.57 (Ghent 2017)
