= Robin Ganter =

German athlete (born 2001)

Personal information
- Nationality: German
- Born: 3 January 2001 (age 25)

Sport
- Sport: Athletics
- Events: Sprints; Relays
- Club: MTG Mannheim

Achievements and titles
- Personal bests: Outdoor; 100 m: 10.13 (Leverkusen, 2024); 200 m: 20.60 (Wetzlar, 2024); Indoor; 60 m: 6.56 (Dortmund, 2025)

Robin Ganter (born 3 January 2001) is a German sprinter. He is a multiple-time German indoor champion over 200 metres, and in 2025 became German indoor champion over 60 metres.

== Career ==
=== 2023 ===
From Mannheim, and a member of MTG Mannheim, he was runner-up over 60 metres at the German Indoor Athletics Championships in February 2023. Subsequently, he made his senior championship debut, at the 2023 European Athletics Indoor Championships in Istanbul, where he reached the semi-finals of the 60 metres. He competed for Germany at the 2023 European Games in Poland over 100 metres and 200 metres, finishing in fifth and sixth place, respectively.

He finished third over 100 metres at the German Athletics Championships in 10.29 seconds. He finished fourth in the 100 metres at the 2023 European Athletics U23 Championships in Espoo, Finland, where he lowered his personal best to 10.28 seconds in the semi final.

=== 2024 ===
He ran as part of the German 4x100m relay team which qualified for the 2024 Paris Olympics at the 2024 World Relays Championships in Nassau, Bahamas. He qualified for the final of the 100 metres at the 2024 European Athletics Championships in Rome, but had to withdraw from the final with a muscle injury, which also caused him to miss-out on the relay race at the Championships, as well as a later chance to run at the Olympic Games.

=== 2025 ===
He ran a personal best 6.56 seconds to win the German Indoor Athletics Championships over 60 metres in February 2025 in Dortmund. He also won his third consecutive 200 metres national title at the championships, running an indoor personal best time of 20.85 seconds. He reached the semi-finals of the 60 metres at the 2025 European Athletics Indoor Championships in Apeldoorn.

=== 2026 ===
In February 2026, Ganter returned to competitive action after an injury break, and placed third defending his title at the German Indoor Championships in the 60 metres final, running 6.57 seconds, but successfully defended his national indoor 200 metres title at the championships, running 21.01 seconds.
