= Belgium at the 1978 European Athletics Championships =

- WA code: BEL
- National federation: Royal Belgian Athletics League
- Website: www.belgian-athletics.be

in Prague
- Competitors: 31
- Medals: Gold 0 Silver 0 Bronze 1 Total 1

European Athletics Championships appearances (overview)
- 1934; 1938; 1946; 1950; 1954; 1958; 1962; 1966; 1969; 1971; 1974; 1978; 1982; 1986; 1990; 1994; 1998; 2002; 2006; 2010; 2012; 2014; 2016; 2018; 2022; 2024

Belgium took 31 competitors to the 1978 European Athletics Championships which took place between 29 August and 3 September 1978 in Prague. Belgium took one medal during the Championship.

== Medalists ==
Medals	Name	Events
3rd place, bronze medalist(s)	Karel Lismont	Men's marathon
