= Guillem Crespí =

Spanish athlete (born 2002)

Personal information
- Nationality: Spanish
- Born: 26 December 2002 (age 23)

Sport
- Sport: Athletics
- Event: Sprint

Achievements and titles
- Personal bests: 60 m: 6.57 (Torun, 2026); 100 m: 10.18 (Rome, 2024)
Medal record
Men's athletics
Representing Spain
European Championships
Bronze medal – third place	2026 Birmingham	4 × 100 m mixed

Guillem Crespí (born 26 December 2002) is a Spanish sprinter. He competed at the 2025 World Athletics Indoor Championships.

== Biography ==
He is a member of Barcelona Atlètisme in Catalonia. He set a personal best time of 10.28 seconds to reach the 100 metres final of the 2023 European Athletics U23 Championships in Espoo in July 2023.

In January 2024, he won the 60 metres at the Catalan Indoor Championships in Sabadell in a championships record time of 6.72 seconds, lowering the 6.74 previous record set by Bernat Canet. In February 2024, he finished in second place at the Spanish Athletics Indoor Championships over 60 metres, running a personal best 6.70 seconds. He ran as part of the Spanish 4 × 100 m relay team at the 2024 World Relays Championships in Nassau, Bahamas.

He qualified for the final of the 100 metres at the 2024 European Athletics Championships in Rome with a personal best time of 10.19 seconds. He finished sixth in the final where he lowered his personal best to 10.18 seconds.

He competed at the 2025 European Athletics Indoor Championships in Apeldoorn, Netherlands in March 2025. He came through qualifying to reach the final, running a personal best of 6.58 seconds in the semi-final. In the final he ran 6.59 seconds to finish in sixth place overall. Later that month, he was selected for the Spanish team to compete at the 2025 World Athletics Indoor Championships in Nanjing, China. He qualified for the semi-finals, where he ran 6.64 seconds but did not progress through to the final.

Crespi won the 60 metres at the 2026 Spanish Indoor Championships in Valencia, running 6.66 seconds in the final. He was selected for the 2026 World Athletics Indoor Championships in Poland, where he reached the semifinals, running a personal best of 6.57 seconds.

Competing at the 2026 World Athletics Relays, he ran as a member of the mixed 4 × 100 m relay alongside Andoni Calbano, Maribel Pérez and Jaël Bestué as they ran a time of 40.51, setting the first national record in this event and qualifying for the final. He also ran in the men's 4 × 100 metres relay at the championships in Gaborone, Botswana. He competed in the 100 metres at the 2026 European Athletics Championships in Birmingham, England in August 2026. Later at the championships, he was a bronze medalist as part of the Spain mixed 4 × 100 m relay team alongside Pérez, Calbano and Bestué. He also ran in the men's 4 × 100 metres relay at the championships.

== International competitions ==
Year	Competition	Venue	Position	Event	Notes
Representing Spain
2023	Mediterranean U23 Indoor Championships	Valencia, Spain	6th	60 m i	6.77
2023	European U23 Championships	Espoo, Finland	5th	100 m	10.34
2023	European U23 Championships	Espoo, Finland	9th (h)	4 × 100 m relay	39.88
2024	World Relays	Nassau, Bahamas	26th (h)	4 × 100 m relay	39.35
2024	European Championships	Rome, Italy	6th	100 m	10.18
2025	European Indoor Championships	Apeldoorn, Netherlands	6th	60 m i	6.59
2025	World Indoor Championships	Nanjing, China	15th (sf)	60 m	6.64
2026	World Indoor Championships	Toruń, Poland	10th (sf)	60 m	6.57
2026	European Championships	Birmingham, United Kingdom	22nd (h)	100 m	10.74
2026	European Championships	Birmingham, United Kingdom	–	4 × 100 m relay	DNF
