= Łukasz Żok =

Polish athlete (born 2001)

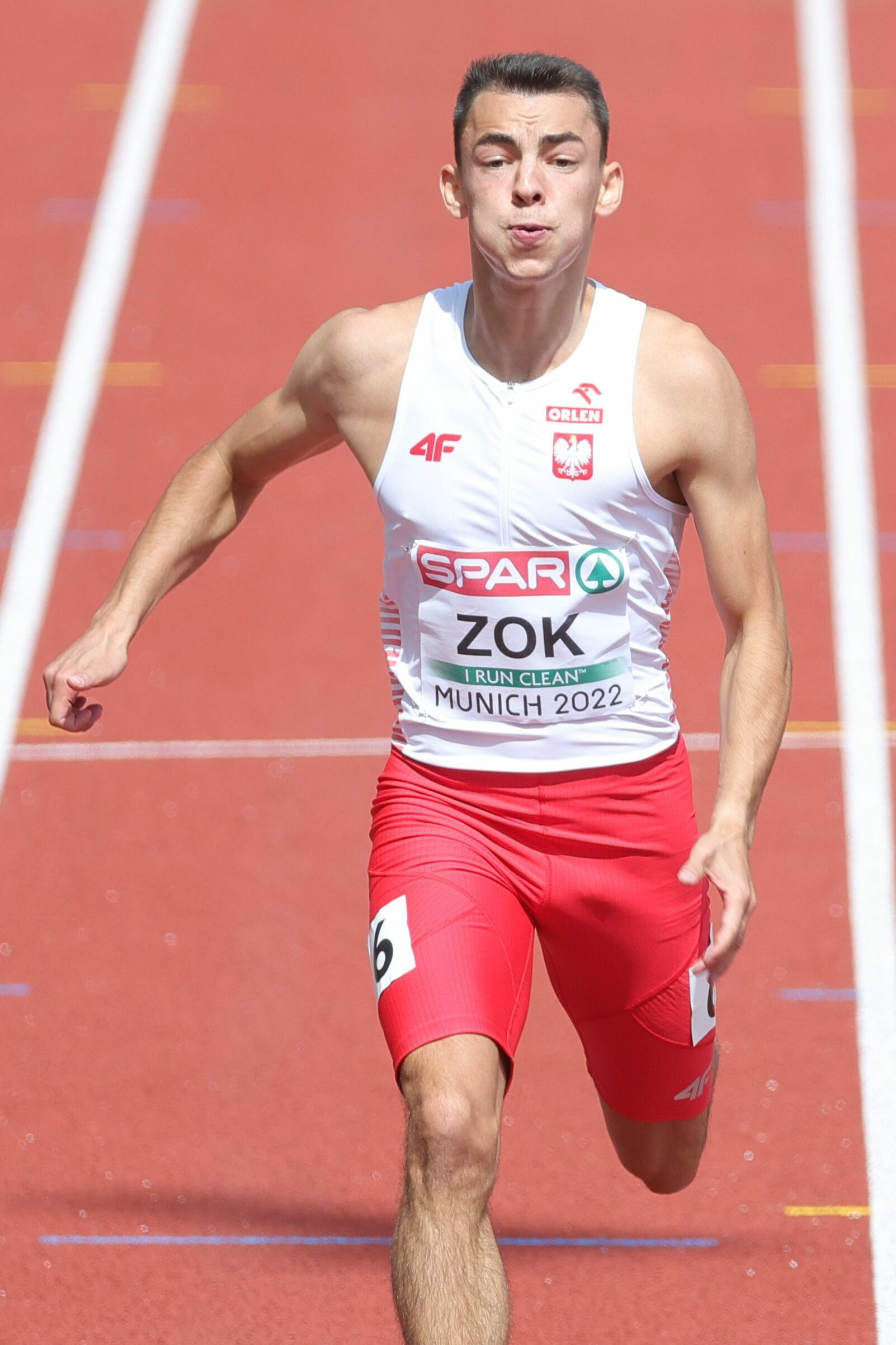
- Żok in 2022

Personal information
- Nationality: Polish
- Born: 17 May 2001 (age 25)

Sport
- Sport: Athletics
- Event: Sprint

Achievements and titles
- Personal best(s): 60m: 6.68 (2025); 100m: 10.39 (2023); 200m: 20.65 (2024); 400m: 49.14 (2023)
Medal record
Men's athletics
Representing Poland
European U23 Championships
| Bronze medal – third place | 2023 Espoo | 4 × 100 m relay |

Łukasz Żok (born 17 May 2001) is a Polish sprinter. He is a multiple-time national champion over 200 metres.

== Biography ==
Żok represented ALKS AJP Gorzów bur later became a member of Lumel Zielona Góra. He was part of the Polish team at the 2021 World Athletics Relays, held in Chorzów, Poland. Żok won the Polish Indoor Athletics Championships over 200 metres in March 2022 in Toruń in a personal best 20.68 seconds.

Żok won the Polish Athletics Championships over 200 metres in July 2022 in Suwalki. In August, Żok represented Poland at the 2022 European Athletics Championships in Munich, Germany, reaching the semi-finals in the 200 metres.

As a member of the Polish 4 x 100 metres relay team, he placed sixth at the 2023 European Athletics Team Championships First Division, held in Chorzów. Żok won the Polish Athletics Championships over 200 metres in Wielkopolski in July 2023. Żok was a bronze medalist at the 2023 European Athletics U23 Championships in Espoo, Finland. He also a finalist in the 200 metres, and placed sixth overall. He was part of the Polish teams at the 2023 Summer World University Games and 2023 World Athletics Championships.

Żok won the Polish Indoor Athletics Chapionships over 200 metres in Toruń in February 2024. In May, he ran as part of the Polish 4 x 100m relay team at the 2024 World Relays Championships in Nassau, Bahamas, helping the team qualify for the Olympic Games. In June, Żok represented Poland at the 2024 European Athletics Championships in Rome, Italy, competing in the 200 metres and the men's sprint relay. Later that month, he ran a personal best 20.65 second for the 200 metres at the Polish Championships to place third.

Żok competed for Poland at the 2026 World Athletics Relays, and was part of the mixed 4 x 100 metres team which set a Polish national record. He also ran in the men's 4 × 100 metres relay at the championships in Gaborone, Botswana.
