= Nathalie De Vos =

Belgian long-distance runner

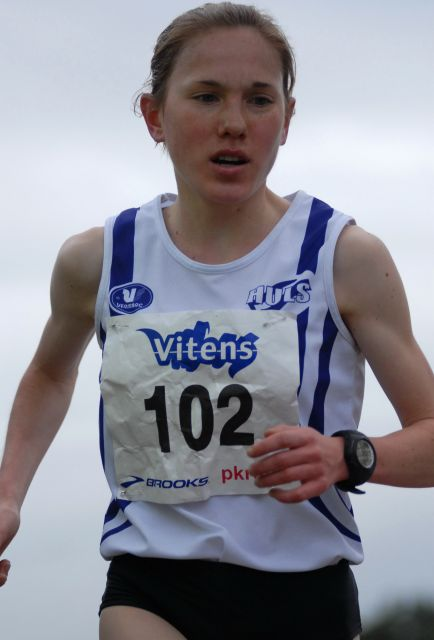
Nathalie De Vos

Nathalie De Vos (born 9 December 1982 in Ghent) is a Belgian long-distance runner who specializes in the 5000 and 10,000 metres.

At the 2006 European Championships she finished eleventh in the 5000 m and tenth in the 10,000 m. Then, in the 10,000 metres, she finished eleventh at the 2007 World Championships and twenty-fourth at the 2008 Olympic Games.

== Personal bests ==
- 5000 metres – 15:22.68 min (2006)
- 10,000 metres – 31:22.80 min (2007)
