= Rodrigo Caetano =

Brazilian sports director and former footballer

Personal information
- Full name: Rodrigo Vilaverde Caetano
- Date of birth: 18 February 1970 (age 56)
- Place of birth: Santo Antônio da Patrulha, Brazil
- Height: 1.70 m (5 ft 7 in)
- Position: Midfielder

Youth career
- 1986–1990: Grêmio

Senior career*
Years	Team	Apps	(Gls)
1989–1991	Grêmio		
1991	→ Aimoré (loan)		
1992–1993	Mogi Mirim		
1993	Brusque		
1994–1995	Brasil de Farroupilha		
1996	Juventude		
1997	Brasil de Farroupilha		
1998	Caxias		
1999	Brasil de Pelotas		
1999	Náutico		
2000	Avenida		
2001	Guarani-VA		
2001	Passo Fundo		
2002	Veranópolis		
2003	São José-CS		

Managerial career
- 2003–2004: RS Futebol (staff)
- 2005–2008: Grêmio (youth sectors)
- 2009–2011: Vasco da Gama (director of football)
- 2012–2013: Fluminense (director of football)
- 2014: Vasco da Gama (director of football)
- 2015–2018: Flamengo (director of football)
- 2018–2020: Internacional (director of football)
- 2021–2024: Atlético Mineiro (director of football)
- 2024–: Brazil (general coordinator)
- * Club domestic league appearances and goals as of 5 May 2025

Rodrigo Vilaverde Caetano (born 18 February 1970), simply known as Rodrigo Caetano, is a Brazilian former professional footballer and football executive.

== Playing career ==
Left midfielder, Rodrigo Caetano was discovered by the youth teams of Grêmio FBPA. He played for most of his career for teams in Rio Grande do Sul, but in 1992 he was part of the Mogi Mirim squad known as "carrosel caipira", alongside Rivaldo and Válber. He experienced his best individual moment in 1996 playing for Juventude, signing a pre-contract with Compostela, but it ended up not being fulfilled due to an injury.

== Executive career ==
Due to a serious knee injury, Caetano struggled in the final part of his career, retiring as a player after playing for São José de Cachoeira do Sul. In 2003, he was invited to work on the staff of RS Futebol, a team founded by then manager Paulo César Carpegiani. After this experience, he studied business administration at Pontifical Catholic University of Rio Grande do Sul and completed an MBA in Business Management at Fundação Getulio Vargas. In 2005, he began working in the youth categories of Grêmio, which lasted until 2008 when, prompted by Roberto Dinamite, then president of Vasco da Gama, he accepted the position of football director of the club.

As director of Vasco, Caetano was part of the club's restructuring after relegation to Série B in 2008 season, which later culminated in the 2011 Copa do Brasil title and runner-up in the 2011 Campeonato Brasileiro Série A. In 2012, he was hired by Fluminense where he remained until 2014, being part of the group that won the state and Brazilian championship in 2012. He returned to Vasco da Gama in 2014, who had again been relegated to Série B.

In 2015, he was chosen by Flamengo as one of the responsibles for the club's financial restructuring, a process led by the management of president Eduardo Bandeira de Mello. Caetano was also responsible for the sale of Vinícius Júnior to Real Madrid for 45 million euros. In March 2018 he was fired from Flamengo, signing in May with Internacional. He remained at the club until the end of 2020, when it was speculated that he would join São Paulo, who later hired Rui Costa for the position. In 2021, he arrived at Atlético Mineiro, having great success again in his work with the club's titles in the 2021 Campeonato Brasileiro and 2021 Copa do Brasil. Caetano remained in the position until 17 February 2024, when he was appointed general coordinator of the CBF, being responsible for the Brazil national team until 2026.
