= Raphael Bouju =

Dutch sprinter (born 2002)

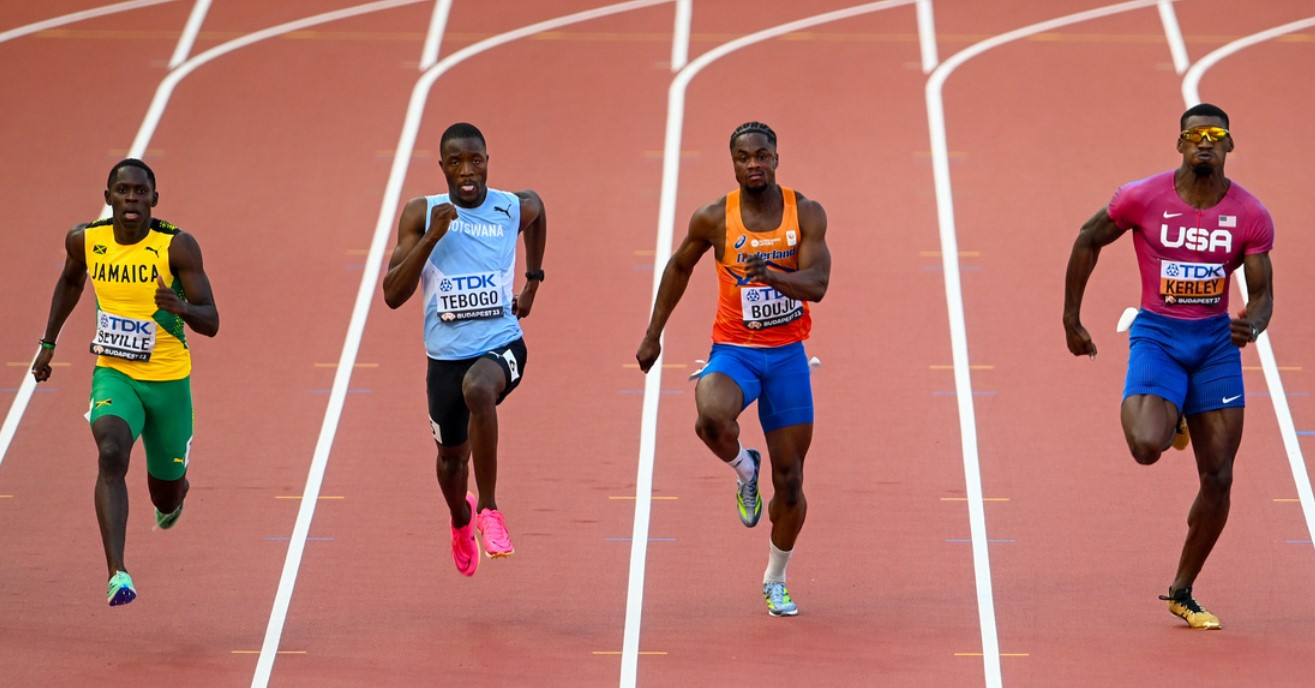
- Raphael Bouju in 2023

Personal information
- Nationality: Dutch
- Born: 15 May 2002 (age 24) Amsterdam, Netherlands

Sport
- Sport: Athletics
- Events: 60m 100m

Achievements and titles
- Personal bests: 60m: 6.56 (Belgrade 2025) NR; 100m: 10.01 (Geneva 2023); 200m: 20.65 (Oordegem 2023)
Medal record
Men's athletics
Representing the Netherlands
European Games
Silver medal – second place	2023 Kraków-Małopolska	100 m
European U23 Championships
Silver medal – second place	2023 Espoo	100 m
Silver medal – second place	2023 Espoo	200 m
European U18 Championships
Gold medal – first place	2018 Győr	100 m
- Updated on 16 July 2023

Raphael Bouju (born 15 May 2002) is a Dutch track and field athlete who competes as a sprinter. A successful junior, he has won senior national Dutch titles over 60m and 100m.

== Early life ==
Born in the Netherlands, Bouju moved to England with his mum and sister in 2006. He returned the Netherlands to train at the Papendal in 2018. He studied International Business at HAN University of applied sciences in Arnhem.

== Junior career ==
In 2018 Bouju won the English Schools inter boys’ 100m in a time of 10.66s. That summer he also won gold in the 100 metres at the 2018 European Athletics U18 Championships. In February 2020 he finished runner up in both the Dutch and British indoor 60m championships, his time of 6.70s setting a new Dutch U-20 record.

== Senior career ==
In June 2022, Bouju won gold in the 100 meters at the Dutch championships in Apeldoorn, and at the same time recorded a new personal best of 10.27 seconds.

In August 2022 at the European Athletics Championships in Munich, he was part of the Netherlands' relay team that finished fourth overall in the 4×100 meters relay.

In February 2023, Bouju took gold in the 60 meters at the Dutch Indoor Championships in Apeldoorn. The following month he competed in the 60 meters at the European Indoor Athletics Championships held in Istanbul. He ran a new personal best time of 6.59 seconds to reach the semi-finals.

In June 2023 he ran a new 100m personal best, running 10.09 in Hengelo. On 2 July 2023 he finished fourth in the 100m at the Diamond League meeting in Stockholm. On 14 July 2023, he won a silver medal at the 2023 European Athletics U23 Championships in the 100 metres behind Jeremiah Azu in Espoo, Finland.

He was selected for the 2023 World Athletics Championships in Budapest. He reached the semi-finals of the 100m.

In January 2025, he ran 6.56 for the 60m at the Belgrade Indoor Meeting in January 2025, breaking the Dutch national indoor record.

He was selected for the Dutch team for the 2025 World Athletics Championships in Tokyo, Japan.
