= Monder Rizki =

Belgian long-distance runner

Monder Rizki (born 16 August 1979) is a Belgian long-distance runner. He was born in Brussels.

At the 2006 European Athletics Championships Rizki finished eleventh in the 5000 metres and seventeenth in the 10,000 metres.

== Personal bests ==
- 3000 metres - 7:42.84 min (2004)
- 5000 metres - 13:04.06 min (2008)
- 10,000 metres - 28:07.10 min (2006)

== Personal Best Indoor ==
- 1500 metres 3:42.83 Gent 22/02/2004
- 3000 metres 7:53.67 Stuttgart 04/02/2006
- Two miles 8:27.23 Birmingham 18/02/2005

== Progression - Outdoor ==
3000 Metres

- 2012 8:01.39 Karlstad GP 19/06/2012
- 2008 7:43.73 Monaco 29/07/2008
- 2007 7:46.94 Oordegem 07/07/2007
- 2005 8:11.70 Leiria 19/06/2005
- 2004 7:42.84 Rehlingen 31/05/2004
- 2003 7:49.26 Oordegem 16/08/2003

5000 Metres

- 2013 13.37.52 Finland 15/06/2013
- 2012 13:35.33 Tunis 16/06/2012
- 2012 13:41.62 Sollentuna 05/06/2012
- 2010 13:31.60 Huelva 09/06/2010
- 2008 13:04.06 Heusden-Zolder 20/07/2008
- 2006 13:27.46 Heusden-Zolder 22/07/2006
- 2005 13:25.66 Rovereto 31/08/2005
- 2004 13:15.51 Heusden-Zolder 31/07/2004
- 2003 13:38.57 Arnhem 25/06/2003

10,000 Metres

- 2009 28:38.27 Ribeira Brava (Madeira06/06/2009
- 2006 28:07.10 Neerpelt 05/06/2006

half marathon

- 2012 67'16" Rouen Fr.
- 2009 61'47" Austine USA
- 2007 64'16" Dallas TX/USA

Road Race 5 km

- 2013 14:03.8 San Jose 28/11/2013

Road Race 30 km

- 2012 1:42:25 Lidingöloppet cross Stockholm SWE 26/09/2012

== Honours ==
1500 Metres

- 10th IAAF World Indoor Championships 9 h 3:49.88 Budapest (SA) 06/03/2004
- European Cup 1st League 3 f 3:44.89 Lappeenranta (Fin) 22/06/2003

3000 Metres

- European Cup First League Group B 3 f 8:11.70 Leiria (Por) 19/06/2005

5000 Metres

- 28e Coupe d'Europe des nations d'athlétisme 1 f 14:15.46 Munich (olympic stadium) 23/06/2007
- The XXIX Olympic Games 8 h 13:54.41 Beijing (National Stadium) 20/08/2008
- 19th European Athletics Championships 11 f 14:04.96 Göteborg 13/08/2006
- 28th Olympic Games 16 h 14:03.58 Athína (Olympic Stadium) 25/08/2004

10,000 Metres

- 13th European Cup 10,000m 7 f 28:38.27 Ribeira Brava (Madeira) 06/06/2009
- 19th European Athletics Championships 17 f 29:13.62 Göteborg 08/08/2006

Short Race

- 31st IAAF World Cross Country Championships 112 f 12:42 Lausanne 29/03/2003
