= Matteo Melluzzo =

Italian sprinter (born 2002)

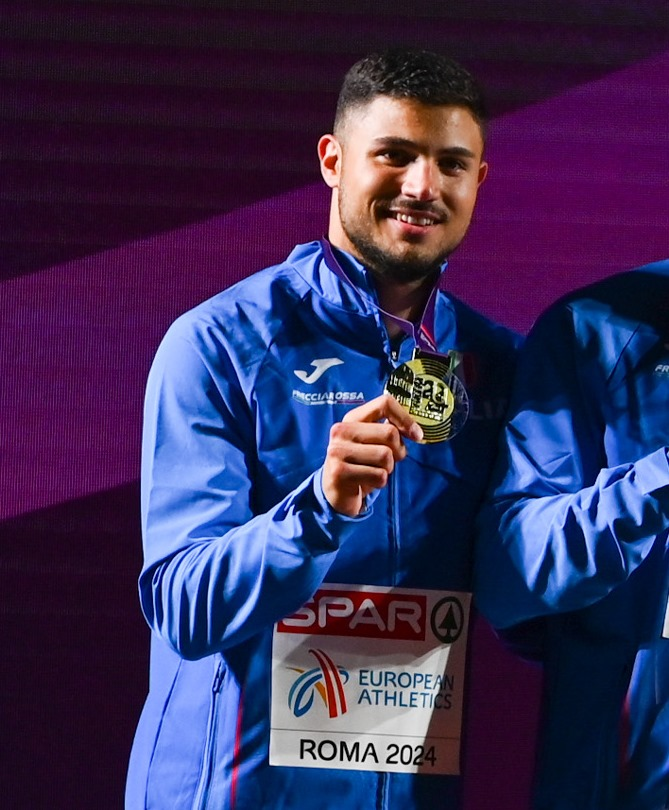

Personal information
- Nationality: Italian
- Born: 29 July 2002 (age 23) Siracusa

Sport
- Sport: Athletics
- Event: Sprint
- Club: Gruppi Sportivi Fiamme Gialle
- Personal best(s): 60 m: 6.65 (Ancona, 2024); 100 m: 10.12 (La Spezia, 2024); 200 m: 21.23 (Siracusa, 2021)
Medal record
Men's athletics
Representing Italy
European Championships
Gold medal – first place	2024 Rome	4 × 100 m relay
European U23 Championships
Gold medal – first place	2023 Espoo	4 × 100 m relay
European U20 Championships
Bronze medal – third place	2021 Tallinn	100 m
Bronze medal – third place	2021 Tallinn	4 × 100 m relay

Matteo Melluzzo (born 29 July 2002) is an Italian sprinter. He won a gold medal at the 2024 European Athletics Championships in the men's 4 × 100 metres relay.

== Biography ==
Melluzzo was a bronze medalist in the 100 metres at the 2021 European Athletics U20 Championships in Tallinn, running 10.31 seconds. At the same event he was a bronze medalist in the men's 4 × 100 m relay.

Melluzzo ran as part of the Italian 4 × 100 m relay team at the 2022 European Athletics Championships in Munich.

Melluzzo was a gold medalist at the 2023 European Athletics U23 Championships in Espoo in the 4 × 100 m relay.

In May 2024, he lowered his 100 m personal best to 10.13 seconds in Rome. He competed for Italy at the 2024 European Athletics Championships in Rome. He competed in the men's 100 metres at the event, and reached the semi-final. However, in his semi-final there was a faulty start which he did not hear. He completed a what-would-have-been personal best run of 10.12 seconds, only to discover the race had been recalled. After another false start, the running of the race did not go well for him with Melluzzo pulling up with a muscle twinge in his calf. His original 10.12 time would have qualified for the final. Later in the championships, he ran as part of the Italian team that won the gold medal in the 4 × 100 m relay.

On 20 June 2024, he won the Italian national 100 metres title with a personal best time of 10.12 seconds. He competed in the men's 4 × 100 metres relay at the 2024 Paris Olympics.

Melluzzo competed at the 2025 World Athletics Relays in China in the Men's 4 × 100 metres relay in May 2025. On the second day of the competition he helped Italy finish fifth overall having previously helped them secure a qualifying place for the upcoming World Championships. In September 2025, he competed in the men's 4 × 100 metres at the 2025 World Championships in Tokyo, Japan.

== Personal life ==
From Syracuse, Sicily, he is a member of Gruppi Sportivi Fiamme Gialle.
