= Rani Vincke =

Belgian sprinter (born 2000)

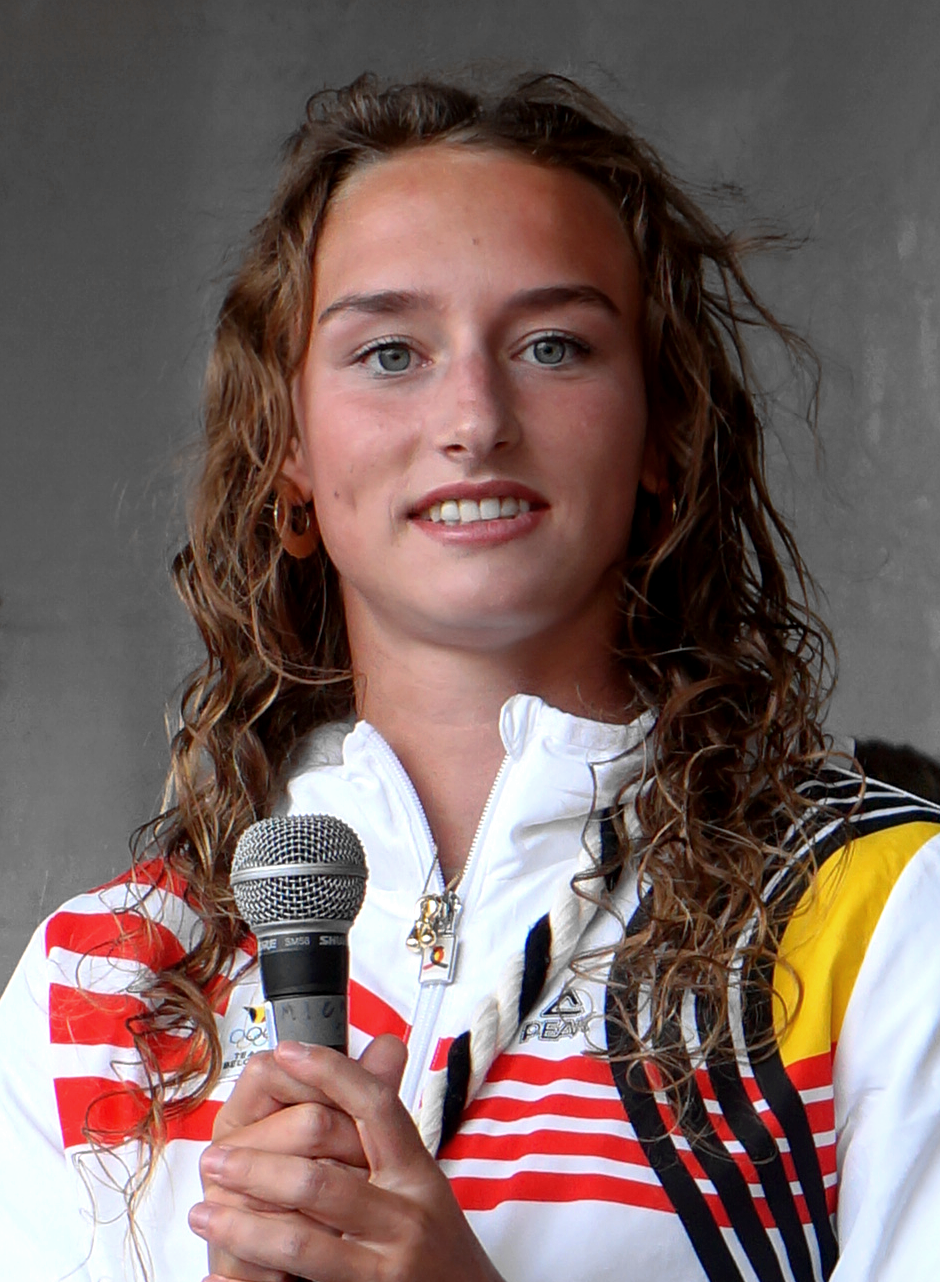

Personal information
- Nationality: Belgian
- Born: 1 March 2000 (age 26)

Sport
- Country: Belgium
- Sport: Athletics
- Events: 60 metres, 100 metres, 200 metres
- Club: KAA Gent Athletic Club
- Coached by: Patrick Himschoot

Rani Vincke (born 1 March 2000) is a Belgian sprinter who represented Belgium at the 2024 Summer Olympics in Paris, France.

== Career ==
Vincke tried different sports at a young age. She swam, danced, and did ten years artistic gymnastics in a local club, the Koninklijke Turnkring Germinal Gistel (Royal Gymnastics circle Germinal Gistel). As she routinely out sprinted the boys in school, her parents enrolled her in an athletics club, Hermes Oostende, and later athletics club Houtland AC in Torhout. When starting her academic studies in Ghent, she joined the sprinter's training group in Ghent under national sprint and hurdles coach Patrick Himschoot. Vincke became a member of the Belgian women's 4 x 100 metres relay team in 2019.

=== 2022 ===
In August, Vincke was a member of the Belgian women's 4 x 100 metres relay team that qualified for the final of the 4 × 100 metres relay at the 2022 European Athletics Championships in Munich, Germany with a seasons best time of 43.58 in the semi-final, before finishing sixth in the final.

=== 2024 ===
In May, Vincke was a member of the Belgian 4 × 100 m relay team at the 2024 World Relays Championships in Nassau, Bahamas that failed to qualify in the Olympic Qualifying round for the 2024 Summer Olympics.

She represented Belgium at the 2024 European Athletics Championships in Rome in June 2024 as a member of the Belgian 4 × 100 m relay team that qualified for the final and finished 6th.

She represented Belgium at the 2024 Summer Olympics in Paris, France as a member of Belgium's women's 4 × 100 metres relay team that, having missed direct qualification at the World Relays Championships managed to qualify for the 2024 Summer Olympic Games via the World Athletics Rankings. The team was however disqualified in round 1 of the women's 4 × 100 metres relay when Elise Mehuys passed the baton to Delphine Nkansa outside the takeover zone.

=== 2026 ===
She represented Belgium at the 2026 European Athletics Championships in Birmingham, United Kingdom in August as a member of the Belgian 4 × 100 m relay team that qualified for the final and finished 5th and as a member of the mixed 4 × 100 m relay team that was disqualified in the final when Cédric Verschueren passed the baton to her outside the takeover zone.

== Personal life ==
Vincke has one brother and three sisters. She attended primary school Klimop in Gistel, then the Royal Atheneum KA Pegasus in Ostend, and finally the Royal Technical Atheneum KTA in Bruges where she finished off middle school with a diploma in sciences-sports. She holds a bachelor interior design from the Royal Academy of Fine Arts (KASK) in Ghent, Belgium and is studying for a Master of Science degree in Urbanism and Spatial Planning at the Ugent in Ghent.

== Personal bests ==
Outdoor

- 100 metres – 11.32* (+4.6 m/s Heusden-Zolder 2024)
- 200 metres – 23.41 (+0.0 m/s Ninove 2024)

Indoor

- 60 metres – 7.34 (Ghent 2023)
- 200 metres – 23.96 (Ghent 2023)
