= Cédric Verschueren =

Belgian sprinter (born 2004)

Personal information
- Nationality: Belgian
- Born: 16 January 2004 (age 22)

Sport
- Sport: Athletics
- Event: Sprints
Medal record
Men's athletics
Representing Belgium
European Championships
Bronze medal – third place	2026 Birmingham	4 × 100 m relay

Cédric Verschueren (born 16 January 2004) is a Belgian sprinter.

== Career ==
In August 2026, he competed at the 2026 European Athletics Championships and was part of the Belgian quartet team that won a historic bronze medal in the 4×100 metres relay. He ran in the preliminary round for the Belgian team. This was Belgium's first ever medal in the event at an international competition.
