= Koen Naert =

Belgian long-distance runner

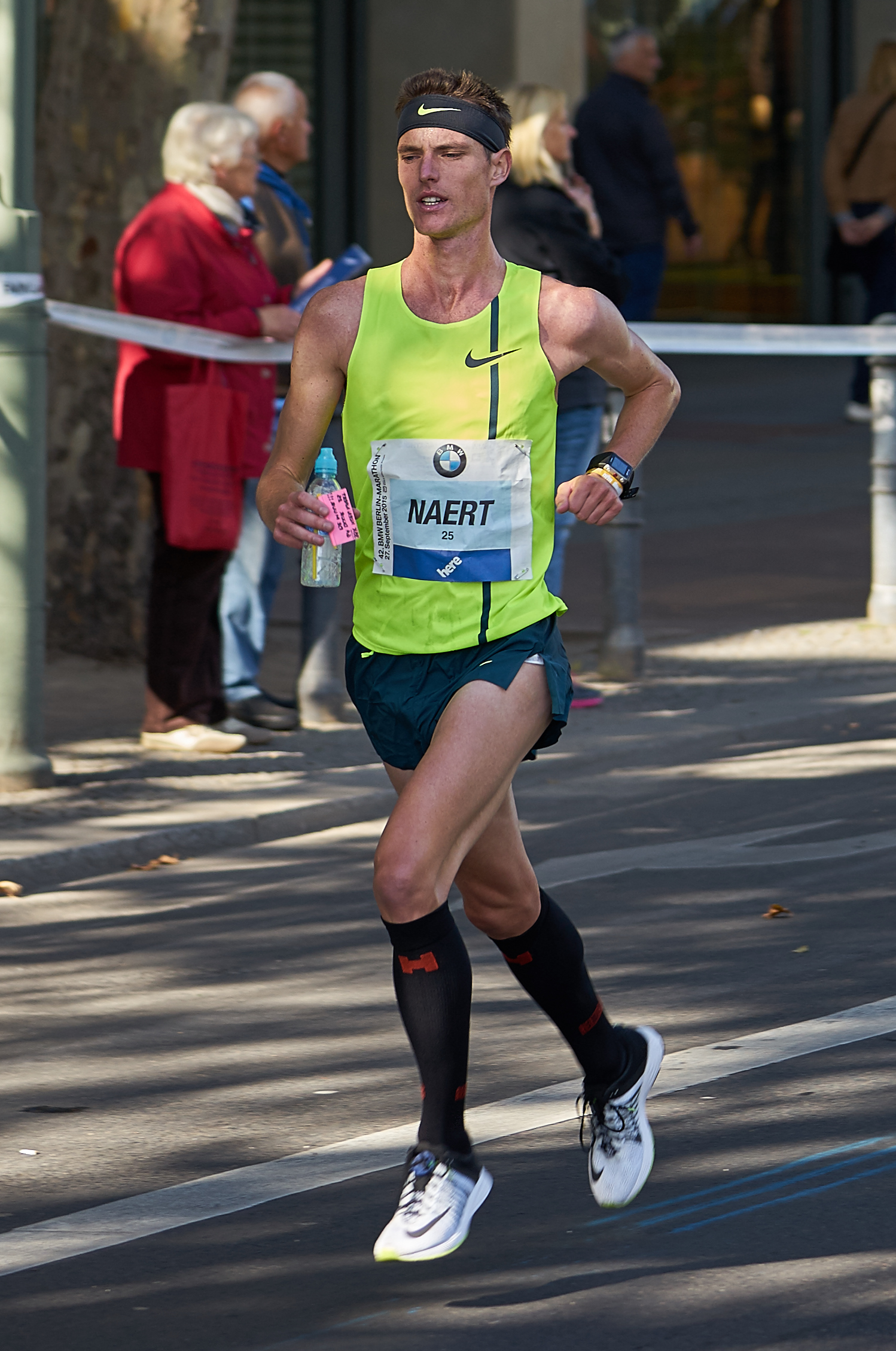
- Naert at the 2015 Berlin Marathon

Personal information
- Born: 3 September 1989 (age 36) Roeselare, Belgium

Sport
- Sport: Athletics

Achievements and titles
- Personal bests: Half marathon: 61:42 (Valencia 2018); Marathon: 2:06:56 (Rotterdam 2023)
Medal record
Men's athletics
Representing Belgium
European Championships
| Gold medal – first place | 2018 Berlin | Marathon |

Koen Naert (born 3 September 1989) is a Belgian athlete who specializes in cross-country and long-distance running.

Naert finished seventh at the 2015 Berlin Marathon and 13th at the 2015 Hamburg Marathon. In 2018, he won the gold medal in the marathon at the European Athletics Championships in Berlin with 2:09:51 for a championship record. His personal best of 2:06:56 comes from the 2023 Rotterdam Marathon, where he placed sixth.

In 2020, he competed in the men's race at the 2020 World Athletics Half Marathon Championships held in Gdynia, Poland.

As a marathon runner, he represented Belgium in 3 successive Summer Olympic Games, finishing in 22nd place in the 2016 Summer Olympics in Rio de Janeiro, Brazil, in 10th place in the 2020 Summer Olympics in Tokyo, Japan, and, after an offday, in 61st place in the 2024 Summer Olympics in Paris, France.

== Statistics ==
=== International competition ===
| Year | Competition | Venue | Position | Event | Notes |
Representing Belgium
| 2008 | European Cross Country Championships | Brussels, Belgium | 35th | U20 Men Individual | 19:35 |
| 2009 | European Cross Country Championships | Dublin, Ireland | 40th | U23 Men Individual | 26:26 |
| 2010 | European Cross Country Championships | Albufeira, Portugal | 39th | U23 Men Individual | 25:22 |
| 2011 | European U23 Championships | Ostrava, Czech Republic | 6th | 10000 m | 29:18.73 |
| 2011 | European Cross Country Championships | Velenje, Slovenia | 14th | U23 Men Individual | 24:05 |
| 2012 | European Championships | Helsinki, Finland | 11th | 10000 m | 29:02.08 |
| 2013 | European Team Championships | Dublin, Ireland | 6th | 3000 m | 8:20.63 |
| 2013 | European Cross Country Championships | Belgrade, Serbia | 9th | Senior Men Individual | 29:54 |
| 2014 | European Team Championships | Tallinn, Estonia | 2nd | 5000 m | 14:16.51 |
| 2014 | European Championships | Zurich, Switzerland | 11th | 10000 m | 29:04.87 |
| 2015 | Hamburg Marathon | Hamburg, Germany | 13th | Marathon | 2:13:39 |
| 2015 | Berlin Marathon | Berlin, Germany | 7th | Marathon | 2:10:31 |
| 2015 | European Cross Country Championships | Hyères, France | 28th | Senior Men Individual | 30:54 |
| 2016 | Great Birmingham Run | Birmingham, United Kingdom | 3rd | Half Marathon | 1:04:24 |
| 2016 | Olympic Games | Rio de Janeiro, Brazil | 22nd | Marathon | 2:14:53 |
| 2016 | Frankfurt Marathon | Frankfurt, Germany | 8th | Marathon | 2:12:27 |
| 2017 | Rotterdam Marathon | Rotterdam, Netherlands | 10th | Marathon | 2:10:16 |
| 2017 | New York City Marathon | New York City, United States | 8th | Marathon | 2:13:21 |
| 2018 | World Half Marathon Championships | Valencia, Spain | 22nd | Half Marathon | 1:01:42 |
| 2018 | European Championships | Berlin, Germany | 1st | Marathon | 2:09:51 |
| 2019 | Rotterdam Marathon | Rotterdam, Netherlands | 7th | Marathon | 2:07:39 |
| 2019 | Fukuoka Marathon | Fukuoka, Japan | 17th | Marathon | 2:15:51 |
| 2020 | World Half Marathon Championships | Gdynia, Poland | 73rd | Half Marathon | 1:03:44 |
| 2021 | Olympic Games | Sapporo, Japan | 10th | Marathon | 2:12:13 |
| 2021 | Valencia Marathon | Valencia, Spain | 18th | Marathon | 2:08:41 |
| 2022 | European Championships | Munich, Germany | 8th | Marathon | 2:11:28 |
| 2023 | Rotterdam Marathon | Rotterdam, Netherlands | 6th | Marathon | 2:06:56 |
| 2023 | New York City Marathon | New York City, United States | 5th | Marathon | 2:10:25 |
| 2024 | Olympic Games | Paris, France | 61st | Marathon | 2:16:55 |
| 2025 | World Championships | Tokyo, Japan | 17th | Marathon | 2:12:52 |
