= Belgian Athletics =

Sports governing body in Belgium

- Sport: Athletics
- Abbreviation: BA
- Affiliation: World Athletics
- Regional affiliation: EAA
- Headquarters: Brussels

Official website
- www.belgian-athletics.be
- (Belgium)

Belgian Athletics (formerly Royal Belgian Athletics Federation, Dutch: Koninklijke Belgische Atletiekbond (KBAB); French: Ligue royale belge d'athlétisme (LRBA)) is the governing body for the sport of athletics in Belgium.

It consists of the Flanders Athletics (Dutch: Atletiek Vlaanderen) and the Francophone League of Athletics (French: Ligue Belge Francophone d'Atléthisme), cooperating for organising the national championships and for participation in international competitions.

== Affiliations ==
- World Athletics
- European Athletic Association (EAA)
- Belgian Olympic and Interfederal Committee

== See also ==
- Belgian men's 4 × 400 metres relay team

== National records ==
The Federation maintains the Belgian records in athletics.
