= 2018 European Cross Country Championships =

- Organisers: EAA
- Edition: 25th
- Date: 9 December
- Host city: Tilburg, Netherlands
- Events: 7
- Distances: 10.3 km – Men; 8.3 km – Women; 5.8 km – Mixed relay 8.3 km – U23 men 6.3 km – U23 women 6.3 km – U20 men 4.30 km – U20 women
- Participation: 555 athletes from 38 nations

The 2018 European Cross Country Championships was the 25th edition of the cross country running competition for European athletes. It was hosted in Tilburg, Netherlands.

== Medal summary ==
Event	Gold		Silver		Bronze	
Senior men	Filip Ingebrigtsen (NOR)	28:49	Isaac Kimeli (BEL)	28:52	Aras Kaya (TUR)	28:56
U23 men	Jimmy Gressier (FRA)	23:37	Samuel Fitwi (GER)	23:45	Hugo Hay (FRA)	23:48
Junior men	Jakob Ingebrigtsen (NOR)	18:00	Ouassim Oumaiz (ESP)	18:09	Elzan Bibić (SRB)	18:11
Senior women	Yasemin Can (TUR)	26:05	Fabienne Schlumpf (SUI)	26:06	Karoline Bjerkeli Grøvdal (NOR)	26:07
U23 women	Anna Emilie Møller (DEN)	20:34	Anna Gehring (GER)	20:36	Weronika Pyzik (POL)	20:46
Junior women	Nadia Battocletti (ITA)	13:46	Delia Sclabas (SUI)	13:47	İnci Kalkan (TUR)	13:48
Senior men's team	Turkey (TUR); Aras Kaya; Kaan Kigen Özbilen; Polat Kemboi Arıkan	14 pts	Great Britain (GBR); Marc Scott; Kristian Jones; Dewi Griffiths	34 pts	Italy (ITA); Yemaneberhan Crippa; Daniele Meucci; Nekagenet Crippa	37 pts
U23 men's team	France (FRA); Jimmy Gressier; Hugo Hay; Fabien Palcau	11 pts	Great Britain (GBR); Patrick Dever; Emile Cairess; Mahamed Mahamed	30 pts	Spain (ESP); Tariku Novales; Adrián Ben; Amin Houkmi	42 pts
Junior men's team	Norway (NOR); Jakob Ingebrigtsen; Simen Halle Haugen; Håkon Stavik	28 pts	Great Britain (GBR); Jake Heyward; Isaac Akers; Mathew Willis	30 pts	Germany (GER); Mohamed Mohumed; Nick Jäger; Dominik Müller	38 pts
Senior women's team	Netherlands (NED); Susan Krumins; Jip Vastenburg; Maureen Koster	20 pts	Great Britain (GBR); Charlotte Arter; Melissa Courtney; Pippa Woolven	24 pts	Germany (GER); Elena Burkard; Fabienne Amrhein; Caterina Granz	50 pts
U23 women team	Germany (GER); Anna Gehring; Miriam Dattke; Lisa Tertsch	22 pts	Spain (ESP); Célia Antón; Carmela Cardama; Marta García	25 pts	Great Britain (GBR); Amy Griffiths; Poppy Tank; Abbie Donnelly	33 pts
Junior women's team	Great Britain (GBR); Amelia Quirk; Khahisa Mhlanga; Grace Brock	23 pts	Netherlands (NED); Jasmijn Lau; Famke Heinst; Roos Blokhuis	28 pts	Turkey (TUR); İnci Kalkan; Emine Akbingöl; Derya Kunur	39 pts
Mixed relay	Spain (ESP); Saúl Ordóñez; Esther Guerrero; Víctor Ruiz; Solange Pereira	16:10	France (FRA); Alexis Miellet; Rénelle Lamote; Mahiedine Mekhissi-Benabbad; Johanna Geyer-Carles	16:12	Belarus (BLR); Artsiom Lohish; Ilona Ivanau; Siarhei Platonau; Volha Nemahai	16:21

== Race results ==
=== Senior men ===
Individual race
Rank	Athlete	Country	Time (m:s)
1st place, gold medalist(s)	Filip Ingebrigtsen	Norway	28:49
2nd place, silver medalist(s)	Isaac Kimeli	Belgium	28:52
3rd place, bronze medalist(s)	Aras Kaya	Turkey	28:56
4	Kaan Kigen Özbilen	Turkey	29:04
5	Napoleon Solomon	Sweden	29:12
6	Yemaneberhan Crippa	Italy	29:14
7	Polat Kemboi Arıkan	Turkey	29:14
8	Adel Mechaal	Spain	29:20
9	Marc Scott	Great Britain	29:21
10	Seán Tobin	Ireland	29:22
11	Daniele Meucci	Italy	29:26
12	Kristian Jones	Great Britain	29:28
13	Dewi Griffiths	Great Britain	29:31
14	Antonio Abadía	Spain	29:35
15	Robin Hendrix	Belgium	29:36
16	Daniel Mateo	Spain	29:40
17	Charlie Hulson	Great Britain	29:43
18	Henrik Ingebrigtsen	Norway	29:45
19	Ole Hesselbjerg	Denmark	29:46
20	Nekagenet Crippa	Italy	29:47
21	Dame Tasama	Belgium	29:47
22	Michael Somers	Belgium	29:49
23	Florian Orth	Germany	29:49
24	Mitko Tsenov	Bulgaria	29:51
25	Hassan Chahdi	France	29:51
26	Kevin Dooney	Ireland	29:53
27	Abdi Hakin Ulad	Denmark	29:53
28	Michel Butter	Netherlands	29:54
29	Ahmed El Mazoury	Italy	29:54
30	Ross Millington	Great Britain	29:57
31	Javier Guerra	Spain	30:00
32	Félix Bour	France	30:02
33	Adhanom Abraha	Sweden	30:03
34	Kevin Maunsell	Ireland	30:11
35	Rui Pinto	Portugal	30:13
36	Tom Erling Kårbø	Norway	30:16
37	Juan Pérez	Spain	30:17
38	Khalid Choukoud	Netherlands	30:18
39	Vasyl Koval	Ukraine	30:19
40	Robel Fsiha	Sweden	30:21
41	Hlynur Andrésson	Iceland	30:25
42	Simon Boch	Germany	30:25
43	Ørjan Grønnevig	Norway	30:26
44	Thijs Nijhuis	Denmark	30:27
45	Miguel Marques	Portugal	30:28
46	Peter Glans	Denmark	30:30
47	Nick Goolab	Great Britain	30:31
48	Andrea Sanguinetti	Italy	30:31
49	André Pereira	Portugal	30:34
50	Simas Bertašius	Lithuania	30:36
51	Fernando Carro	Spain	30:37
52	Yegor Nikolayev	Russia	30:37
53	Mehdi Belhadj	France	30:39
54	Alexandre Saddedine	France	30:39
55	Kevin Batt	Ireland	30:41
56	Philipp Reinhardt	Germany	30:44
57	Damien Gras	France	30:46
58	Kaur Kivistik	Estonia	30:50
59	Artyom Alekseyev	Russia	30:51
60	Konstantin Wedel	Germany	30:53
61	Jiří Homoláč	Czech Republic	30:54
62	António Silva	Portugal	30:58
63	Ruslan Savchuk	Ukraine	31:03
64	Marhu Teferi	Israel	31:05
65	Ronald Schröer	Netherlands	31:06
66	Andreas Vojta	Austria	31:09
67	Mick Clohisey	Ireland	31:11
68	Olavi Allase	Estonia	31:14
69	Jacob Simonsen	Denmark	31:20
70	Cihat Ulus	Turkey	31:26
71	Roy Hoornweg	Netherlands	31:26
72	Mikkel Dahl-Jessen	Denmark	31:32
73	David Nikolli	Italy	31:42
74	Bohdan-Ivan Horodyskyy	Ukraine	31:48
75	Timon Theuer	Austria	31:48
76	Marco Kern	Switzerland	31:54
77	Justinas Beržanskis	Lithuania	31:55
78	Damian Landers	Ireland	32:08
79	Tibor Sahajda	Slovakia	32:12
80	Ilias Hernandez	Switzerland	32:17
81	Karel Hussar	Estonia	32:34
82	Florian Lussy	Switzerland	32:38
83	Yehor Zhukov	Ukraine	32:58
84	Ilir Këllëzi	Albania	34:12
85	Sonny Folcheri	Monaco	36:03
—	Jannik Arbogast	Germany	DNS
—	Marouan Razine	Italy	DNF
—	David Nilsson	Sweden	DNF
—	Iolo Nikolov	Bulgaria	DNF

Team race
Rank	Team	Points
1st place, gold medalist(s)	Turkey; Aras Kaya; Kaan Kigen Özbilen; Polat Kemboi Arıkan; Cihat Ulus	14 (3+4+7)
2nd place, silver medalist(s)	Great Britain; Marc Scott; Kristian Jones; Dewi Griffiths; Charlie Hulson; Ross Millington; Nick Goolab	34 (9+12+13)
3rd place, bronze medalist(s)	Italy; Yemaneberhan Crippa; Daniele Meucci; Nekagenet Crippa; Ahmed El Mazoury; Andrea Sanguinetti; Marouan Razine	37 (6+11+20)
4	Belgium; Isaac Kimeli; Robin Hendrix; Dame Tasama; Michael Somers	38 (2+15+21)
5	Spain; Adel Mechaal; Antonio Abadía; Daniel Mateo; Javier Guerra; Juan Pérez; Fernando Carro	38 (8+14+16)
6	Norway; Filip Ingebrigtsen; Henrik Ingebrigtsen; Tom Erling Kårbø; Ørjan Grønnevig	55 (1+18+36)
7	Ireland; Seán Tobin; Kevin Dooney; Kevin Maunsell; Kevin Batt; Mick Clohisey; Damian Landers	70 (10+26+34)
8	Sweden; Napoleon Solomon; Adhanom Abraha; Robel Fsiha; David Nilsson	78 (5+33+40)
9	Denmark; Ole Hesselbjerg; Abdi Hakin Ulad; Thijs Nijhuis; Peter Glans; Jacob Simonsen; Mikkel Dahl-Jessen	90 (19+27+44)
10	France; Hassan Chahdi; Félix Bour; Mehdi Belhadj; Alexandre Saddedine; Damien Gras	110 (25+32+53)
11	Germany; Florian Orth; Simon Boch; Philipp Reinhardt; Konstantin Wedel; Jannik Arbogast	121 (23+42+56)
12	Portugal; Rui Pinto; Miguel Marques; André Pereira; António Silva	129 (35+45+49)
13	Netherlands; Michel Butter; Khalid Choukoud; Ronald Schröer; Roy Hoornweg	131 (28+38+65)
14	Ukraine; Vasyl Koval; Ruslan Savchuk; Bohdan-Ivan Horodyskyy; Yehor Zhukov	176 (39+63+74)
15	Estonia; Kaur Kivistik; Olavi Allase; Karel Hussar	207 (58+68+81)
16	Switzerland; Marco Kern; Ilias Hernandez; Florian Lussy	238 (76+80+82)

=== Senior women ===
Individual race
Rank	Athlete	Country	Time (m:s)
1st place, gold medalist(s)	Yasemin Can	Turkey	26:05
2nd place, silver medalist(s)	Fabienne Schlumpf	Switzerland	26:06
3rd place, bronze medalist(s)	Karoline Bjerkeli Grøvdal	Norway	26:07
4	Susan Krumins	Netherlands	26:16
5	Jip Vastenburg	Netherlands	26:45
6	Elena Burkard	Germany	26:53
7	Charlotte Arter	Great Britain	26:57
8	Melissa Courtney	Great Britain	26:59
9	Pippa Woolven	Great Britain	27:02
10	Jess Piasecki	Great Britain	27:03
11	Maureen Koster	Netherlands	27:08
12	Trihas Gebre	Spain	27:16
13	Charlotta Fougberg	Sweden	27:17
14	Anna Gosk	Poland	27:20
15	Kate Avery	Great Britain	27:20
16	Liv Westphal	France	27:20
17	Marie Bouchard	France	27:21
18	Maja Alm	Denmark	27:22
19	Fabienne Amrhein	Germany	27:26
20	Verity Ockenden	Great Britain	27:30
21	Julia van Velthoven	Netherlands	27:30
22	Nina Lauwaert	Belgium	27:34
23	Samrawit Mengsteab	Sweden	27:39
24	Özlem Kaya	Turkey	27:41
25	Caterina Granz	Germany	27:43
26	Sara Louise Treacy	Ireland	27:46
27	Deborah Schöneborn	Germany	27:47
28	Carla Salomé Rocha	Portugal	27:48
29	Moira Stewartová	Czech Republic	27:49
30	Ancuța Bobocel	Romania	27:50
31	Hanna Klein	Germany	27:53
32	Viktoriya Kalyuzhna	Ukraine	27:54
33	Silje Fjørtoft	Norway	27:54
34	Roxana Bârcă	Romania	27:55
35	Nuria Lugueros	Spain	27:58
36	Imana Truyers	Belgium	27:59
37	Aurore Guerin	France	28:00
38	Tania Carretero	Spain	28:02
39	Valeria Roffino	Italy	28:02
40	Militsa Mircheva	Bulgaria	28:03
41	Inês Monteiro	Portugal	28:05
42	Paula Todoran	Romania	28:07
43	Ciara Mageean	Ireland	28:08
44	Lisa Havell	Sweden	28:10
45	María José Pérez	Spain	28:11
46	Cristina Simion	Romania	28:11
47	Christine Santi	Italy	28:12
48	Sophie Duarte	France	28:13
49	Giovanna Epis	Italy	28:15
50	Claire Perraux	France	28:19
51	Michelle Finn	Ireland	28:23
52	Yevheniya Prokofyeva	Ukraine	28:23
53	Valeriya Zinenko	Ukraine	28:26
54	Hanna Vandenbussche	Belgium	28:26
55	Sigrid Jervell Våg	Norway	28:32
56	Ophélie Claude-Boxberger	France	28:35
57	Ann Marie McGlynn	Ireland	28:40
58	Catarina Ribeiro	Portugal	28:42
59	Zulema Fuentes-Pila	Spain	28:45
60	Aleksandra Brzezińska	Poland	28:46
61	Elena Loyo	Spain	28:47
62	Fionnuala Ross	Ireland	28:48
63	Tubay Erdal	Turkey	28:57
64	Kerry O'Flaherty	Ireland	29:00
65	Cátia Santos	Portugal	29:01
66	Claudia Prisecaru	Romania	29:10
67	Oksana Rayta	Ukraine	29:23
68	Jill Holterman	Netherlands	29:39
69	Loreta Kančytė	Lithuania	29:48
—	Jéssica Augusto	Portugal	DNF
—	Simone Christensen Glad	Denmark	DNF
—	Sara Moreira	Portugal	DNF

Team race
Rank	Team	Points
1st place, gold medalist(s)	Netherlands; Susan Krumins; Jip Vastenburg; Maureen Koster; Julia van Velthoven; Jill Holterman	20 (4+5+11)
2nd place, silver medalist(s)	Great Britain; Charlotte Arter; Melissa Courtney; Pippa Woolven; Jess Piasecki; Kate Avery; Verity Ockenden	24 (7+8+9)
3rd place, bronze medalist(s)	Germany; Elena Burkard; Fabienne Amrhein; Caterina Granz; Deborah Schöneborn; Hanna Klein	50 (6+19+25)
4	France; Liv Westphal; Marie Bouchard; Aurore Guerin; Sophie Duarte; Claire Perraux; Ophélie Claude-Boxberger	70 (16+17+37)
5	Sweden; Charlotta Fougberg; Samrawit Mengsteab; Lisa Havell	80 (13+23+44)
6	Spain; Trihas Gebre; Nuria Lugueros; Tania Carretero; María José Pérez; Zulema Fuentes-Pila; Elena Loyo	85 (12+35+38)
7	Turkey; Yasemin Can; Özlem Kaya; Tubay Erdal	88 (1+24+63)
8	Norway; Karoline Bjerkeli Grøvdal; Silje Fjørtoft; Sigrid Jervell Våg	91 (3+33+55)
9	Romania; Ancuța Bobocel; Roxana Bârcă; Paula Todoran; Cristina Simion; Claudia Prisecaru	106 (30+34+42)
10	Belgium; Nina Lauwaert; Imana Truyers; Hanna Vandenbussche	112 (22+36+54)
11	Ireland; Sara Louise Treacy; Ciara Mageean; Michelle Finn; Ann Marie McGlynn; Fionnuala Ross; Kerry O'Flaherty	120 (26+43+51)
12	Portugal; Carla Salomé Rocha; Inês Monteiro; Catarina Ribeiro; Cátia Santos; Jéssica Augusto; Sara Moreira	127 (28+41+58)
13	Italy; Valeria Roffino; Christine Santi; Giovanna Epis	135 (39+47+49)
14	Ukraine; Viktoriya Kalyuzhna; Yevheniya Prokofyeva; Valeriya Zinenko; Oksana Rayta	137 (32+52+53)

=== Senior mixed relay ===
Rank	Team	Time (m:s)
1st place, gold medalist(s)	Spain; Saúl Ordóñez, Esther Guerrero, Víctor Ruiz, Solange Andreia Pereira	16:10
2nd place, silver medalist(s)	France; Alexis Miellet, Rénelle Lamote, Mahiedine Mekhissi-Benabbad, Johanna Geyer-Carles	16:12
3rd place, bronze medalist(s)	Belarus; Artsiom Lohish, Ilona Ivanau, Siarhei Platonau, Volha Nemahai	16:21
4	Great Britain; Jamie Williamson, Alexandra Bell, Phil Sesemann, Jessica Judd	16:24
5	Ukraine; Oleh Kayafa, Orysya Demyanyuk, Volodymyr Kyts, Iryna Bubnyak	16:30
6	Sweden; Emil Blomberg, Hanna Hermansson, Elmar Engholm, Anna Silvander	16:32
7	Belgium; Ismael Debjani, Elise Vanderelst, Pieter-Jan Hannes, Sofie Van Accom	16:34
8	Latvia; Alberts Blajs, Līga Velvere, Ugis Jocis, Agata Strausa	16:40
9	Ireland; Paul Robinson, Síofra Cléirigh Büttner, John Travers, Claire Tarplee	16:40
10	Portugal; Emanuel Rolim, Salomé Afonso, Paulo Pinheiro, Susana Francisco	16:44
11	Italy; Abdikadar Sheikh Ali, Eleonora Vandi, Ala Zoghlami, Giulia Aprile	16:51
12	Denmark; Nick Jensen, Dagmar Olsen, Andreas Holst Lindgreen, Laura Rosing Møller	17:02

=== U23 men ===
Individual race
Rank	Athlete	Country	Time (m:s)
1st place, gold medalist(s)	Jimmy Gressier	France	23:37
2nd place, silver medalist(s)	Samuel Fitwi	Germany	23:45
3rd place, bronze medalist(s)	Hugo Hay	France	23:48
4	Ryan Forsyth	Ireland	23:49
5	Patrick Dever	Great Britain	24:05
6	Tariku Novales	Spain	24:05
7	Fabien Palcau	France	24:06
8	Emile Cairess	Great Britain	24:07
9	Louis Gilavert	France	24:11
10	Adrian Ben	Spain	24:12
11	Stan Niesten	Netherlands	24:13
12	Simone Colombini	Italy	24:13
13	Markus Görger	Germany	24:17
14	Dorian Boulvin	Belgium	24:19
15	Amanuel Gergis	Sweden	24:20
16	Tadesse Getahon	Israel	24:23
17	Mahamed Mahamed	Great Britain	24:24
18	Yann Schrub	France	24:25
19	Oliver Fox	Great Britain	24:25
20	Mike Foppen	Netherlands	24:29
21	Dieter Kersten	Belgium	24:31
22	Jonas Gertsen	Denmark	24:36
23	Simon Debognies	Belgium	24:41
24	Topi Raitanen	Finland	24:42
25	Clément Deflandre	Belgium	24:43
26	Amin Houkmi El Jarmouni	Spain	24:43
27	Paulos Surafel	Great Britain	24:46
28	John Millar	Great Britain	24:47
29	Brian Fay	Ireland	24:47
30	Ivo Balabanov	Bulgaria	24:52
31	Emil Danielsson	Sweden	24:54
32	Gashau Ayale	Israel	24:55
33	Davor Aaron Bienenfeld	Germany	24:56
34	Jannik Seelhöfer	Germany	24:57
35	Viktor Šinágl	Czech Republic	24:58
36	Paul O'Donnell	Ireland	24:58
37	Pablo Sánchez	Spain	25:00
38	Lukas Eisele	Germany	25:01
39	Yitayew Abuhay	Israel	25:02
40	Alessandro Giacobazzi	Italy	25:03
41	Jennen Mortier	Belgium	25:06
42	Luca Sinn	Austria	25:07
43	Onur Aras	Turkey	25:08
44	Godadaw Belachew	Israel	25:08
45	Riccardo Mugnosso	Italy	25:10
46	Ferhat Bozkurt	Turkey	25:10
47	Tom Hendrikse	Netherlands	25:10
48	João Pereira	Portugal	25:11
49	Siarhei Krauchenia	Belarus	25:14
50	Simon Sundström	Sweden	25:16
51	Cathal Doyle	Ireland	25:17
52	Gabriel Steffensen	Sweden	25:21
53	Bukayawe Malede	Israel	25:23
54	Dariusz Boratyński	Poland	25:27
55	Ignacio Fontes	Spain	25:29
56	Jack O'Leary	Ireland	25:31
57	Ricardo Ferreira	Portugal	25:31
58	Ahmed Ouhda	Italy	25:33
59	Andrei Sushchenia	Belarus	25:34
60	Filipe Fialho	Portugal	25:34
61	Wojciech Sowik	Poland	25:36
62	Andres Jimenez	Spain	25:38
63	Manuel De Backer	Netherlands	25:45
64	Pedro Silva	Portugal	25:45
65	Mateusz Kaczmarek	Poland	25:46
66	Artem Alfimov	Ukraine	25:47
67	Viachaslau Skudny	Belarus	25:48
68	Jáchym Kovář	Czech Republic	25:50
69	Jacopo De Marchi	Italy	25:55
70	Serhiy Shevchenko	Ukraine	25:55
71	Nikodem Dworczak	Poland	25:59
72	Mateusz Dębski	Poland	26:00
73	Siarhei Zeliankouskiy	Belarus	26:00
74	Ömer Günen	Turkey	26:03
75	Pavel Nebyt	Belarus	26:04
76	Konstantinos Stamoulis	Greece	26:04
77	Yani Khelaf	France	26:04
78	Nicolae Marian Felix Coman	Romania	26:09
79	Andriy Aliksiychuk	Ukraine	26:14
80	Gary Campbell	Ireland	26:14
81	Kristian Holm Jensen	Denmark	26:15
82	Dario Ivanovski	North Macedonia	26:16
83	Taras Chukan	Ukraine	26:18
84	Ramazan Karagöz	Turkey	26:19
85	Petar Bratulić	Croatia	26:25
86	Leonid Latsepov	Estonia	26:31
87	Mark Abner	Estonia	26:42
88	Laviniu Madalin Chis	Romania	26:49
89	Ionut Valentin Dragusin	Romania	26:52
90	Julian Kreutzer	Austria	26:59
91	Aliaksei Amelchanka	Belarus	27:09
92	Georgios Michalis Tassis	Greece	27:15
	Dorin Andrei Rusu	Romania	DNF

Team race
Rank	Team	Points
1st place, gold medalist(s)	France; Jimmy Gressier, Hugo Hay, Fabien Palcau, Louis Gilavert, Yann Schrub, Yani Khelaf	1+3+7=11
2nd place, silver medalist(s)	Great Britain; Patrick Dever, Emile Cairess, Mahamed Mahamed, Oliver Fox, Paulos Surafel, John Millar	5+8+17=30
3rd place, bronze medalist(s)	Spain; Tariku Novales, Adrian Ben, Amin Houkmi El Jarmouni, Pablo Sánchez, Ignacio Fontes, Andres Jimenez	6+10+26=42
4	Germany; Samuel Fitwi, Markus Görger, Davor Aaron Bienenfeld, Jannik Seelhöfer, Lukas Eisele	2+13+33=48
5	Belgium; Dorian Boulvin, Dieter Kersten, Simon Debognies, Clément Deflandre, Jennen Mortier	14+21+23=58
6	Ireland; Ryan Forsyth, Brian Fay, Paul O'Donnell, Cathal Doyle, Jack O'Leary, Gary Campbell	4+29+36=69
7	Netherlands; Stan Niesten, Mike Foppen, Tom Hendrikse, Manuel De Backer	11+20+47=78
8	Israel; Tadesse Getahon, Gashau Ayale, Yitayew Abuhay, Godadaw Belachew, Bukayawe Malede	16+32+39=87
9	Sweden; Amanuel Gergis, Emil Danielsson, Simon Sundström, Gabriel Steffensen	15+31+50=96
10	Italy; Simone Colombini, Alessandro Giacobazzi, Riccardo Mugnosso, Ahmed Ouhda, Jacopo De Marchi	12+40+45=97
11	Turkey; Onur Aras, Ferhat Bozkurt, Ömer Günen, Ramazan Karagöz	43+46+74=163
12	Portugal; João Pereira, Ricardo Ferreira, Filipe Fialho, Pedro Silva	48+57+60=165
13	Belarus; Siarhei Krauchenia, Andrei Sushchenia, Viachaslau Skudny, Siarhei Zeliankouskiy, Pavel Nebyt, Aliaksei Amelchanka	49+59+67=175
14	Poland; Dariusz Boratyński, Wojciech Sowik, Mateusz Kaczmarek, Nikodem Dworczak, Mateusz Dębski	54+61+65=180
15	Ukraine; Artem Alfimov, Serhiy Shevchenko, Andriy Aliksiychuk, Taras Chukan	66+70+79=215
16	Romania; Nicolae Marian Felix Coman, Laviniu Madalin Chis, Ionut Valentin Dragusin, Dorin Andrei Rusu	78+88+89=255

=== U23 women ===
Individual race
Rank	Athlete	Country	Time (m:s)
1st place, gold medalist(s)	Anna Emilie Møller	Denmark	20:34
2nd place, silver medalist(s)	Anna Gehring	Germany	20:36
3rd place, bronze medalist(s)	Weronika Pyzik	Poland	20:46
4	Chiara Scherrer	Switzerland	20:48
5	Célia Antón	Spain	20:57
6	Miriam Dattke	Germany	20:58
7	Amy Griffiths	Great Britain	21:04
8	Carmela Cardama	Spain	21:04
9	Poppy Tank	Great Britain	21:05
10	Mathilde Senechal	France	21:06
11	Eglė Morėnaitė	Lithuania	21:07
12	Marta García	Spain	21:13
13	Yayla Kiliç	Turkey	21:13
14	Lisa Tertsch	Germany	21:13
15	Lea Meyer	Germany	21:14
16	Eilish Flanagan	Ireland	21:17
17	Abbie Donnelly	Great Britain	21:19
18	Kristýna Dvořáková	Czech Republic	21:22
19	Rebecca Lonedo	Italy	21:24
20	Flavia Stutz	Switzerland	21:24
21	Dani Chattenton	Great Britain	21:30
22	Leila Hadji	France	21:30
23	Federica Zanne	Italy	21:31
24	Emeline Delanis	France	21:31
25	Aoibhe Richardson	Ireland	21:32
26	Büsra Nur Koku	Turkey	21:34
27	Alberte Kjær Pedersen	Denmark	21:36
28	Josephine Thestrup	Denmark	21:42
29	Tifenn Piolot-Doco	France	21:42
30	Lydia Turner	Great Britain	21:43
31	Karyna Radzeyuk	Belarus	21:44
32	Svenja Pingpank	Germany	21:44
33	Noemi Cano	Spain	21:45
34	Vanessa Scaunet	Belgium	21:47
35	Alice Mitard	France	21:49
36	Mara Ghidini	Italy	21:49
37	Patrycja Kapała	Poland	21:58
38	Sümeyye Erol	Turkey	22:01
39	Bahar Yıldırım	Turkey	22:02
40	Tatsiana Shabanava	Belarus	22:02
41	Roisin Flanagan	Ireland	22:04
42	Lilia Martins	Portugal	22:07
43	Fian Sweeney Sullivan	Ireland	22:08
44	Lisa Rooms	Belgium	22:09
45	Emily Moyes	Great Britain	22:10
46	Maria Ahm	Denmark	22:11
47	Veronika Zrastáková	Slovakia	22:11
48	Gabrielė Paužaitė	Lithuania	22:11
49	Aneta Chlebiková	Czech Republic	22:11
50	Anna Zhmurko	Ukraine	22:17
51	Burcu Subatan	Turkey	22:17
52	Yuliya Moroz	Ukraine	22:23
53	Maria Larsen	Denmark	22:23
54	Siobhra O'Flaherty	Ireland	22:25
55	Kamilė Vaidžiulytė	Lithuania	22:27
56	Ellen Van Der Kolk	Netherlands	22:28
57	Lara Alemanni	Switzerland	22:30
58	Tereza Hrochová	Czech Republic	22:31
59	Manuela Martins	Portugal	22:34
60	Paula González	Spain	22:41
61	Maider Leoz	Spain	22:47
62	Maryna Nemchenko	Ukraine	22:54
63	Sara Schou Kristensen	Denmark	22:55
64	Viktoriya Fedchyk	Ukraine	22:55
65	Tereza Korvasová	Czech Republic	22:56
66	Sorcha McAllister	Ireland	23:16
67	Helena Alves	Portugal	23:19
68	Alina Butnariu	Romania	23:23
69	Zuzana Durcová	Slovakia	23:59
	Kateřina Divišová	Czech Republic	DNF
	Elsa Racasan	France	DNS

Team race
Rank	Team	Points
1st place, gold medalist(s)	Germany; Anna Gehring, Miriam Dattke, Lisa Tertsch, Lea Meyer, Svenja Pingpank	2+6+14=22
2nd place, silver medalist(s)	Spain; Célia Antón, Carmela Cardama, Marta García, Noemi Cano, Paula González, Maider Leoz	5+8+12=25
3rd place, bronze medalist(s)	Great Britain; Amy Griffiths, Poppy Tank, Abbie Donnelly, Dani Chattenton, Lydia Turner, Emily Moyes	7+9+17=33
4	France; Mathilde Senechal, Leila Hadji, Emeline Delanis, Tifenn Piolot-Doco, Alice Mitard, Elsa Racasan	10+22+24=56
5	Denmark; Anna Emilie Møller, Alberte Kjær Pedersen, Josephine Thestrup, Maria Ahm, Maria Larsen, Sara Schou Kristensen	1+27+28=56
6	Turkey; Yayla Kiliç, Büsra Nur Koku, Sümeyye Erol, Bahar Yıldırım, Burcu Subatan	13+26+38=77
7	Italy; Rebecca Lonedo, Federica Zanne, Mara Ghidini	19+23+36=78
8	Switzerland; Chiara Scherrer, Flavia Stutz, Lara Alemanni	4+20+57=81
9	Ireland; Eilish Flanagan, Aoibhe Richardson, Roisin Flanagan, Fian Sweeney Sullivan, Siobhra O'Flaherty, Sorcha McAllister	16+25+41=82
10	Lithuania; Eglė Morėnaitė, Gabrielė Paužaitė, Kamilė Vaidžiulytė	11+48+55=114
11	Czech Republic; Kristýna Dvořáková, Aneta Chlebiková, Tereza Hrochová, Tereza Korvasová, Kateřina Divišová	18+49+58=125
12	Ukraine; Anna Zhmurko, Yuliya Moroz, Maryna Nemchenko, Viktoriya Fedchyk	50+52+62=164
13	Portugal; Lilia Martins, Manuela Martins, Helena Alves	42+59+67=168

=== U20 men ===
Individual race
Rank	Athlete	Country	Time (m:s)
1st place, gold medalist(s)	Jakob Ingebrigtsen	Norway	18:00
2nd place, silver medalist(s)	Ouassim Oumaiz	Spain	18:09
3rd place, bronze medalist(s)	Elzan Bibić	Serbia	18:11
4	Jake Heyward	Great Britain	18:16
5	Simen Halle Haugen	Norway	18:18
6	Mohamed Mohumed	Germany	18:27
7	Mohamed-Amine Kodad	France	18:28
8	Ayetullah Aslanhan	Turkey	18:45
9	Nick Jäger	Germany	18:47
10	Valentin Bresc	France	18:47
11	Bram Anderiessen	Netherlands	18:47
12	Isaac Akers	Great Britain	18:48
13	Ramazan Baştuğ	Turkey	18:48
14	Matthew Willis	Great Britain	18:49
15	Tim Van De Velde	Belgium	18:53
16	Darragh McElhinney	Ireland	18:53
17	Marios Anagnostou	Greece	18:54
18	Seán O'Leary	Ireland	19:01
19	Ryan Oosting	Netherlands	19:02
20	Omar Ismail	Sweden	19:02
21	Jamie Battle	Ireland	19:03
22	Håkon Stavik	Norway	19:05
23	Dominik Müller	Germany	19:06
24	Arthur Gervais	France	19:07
25	Adrian Garcea	Romania	19:08
26	Tim Verbaandert	Netherlands	19:09
27	Lucas Da Silva	Belgium	19:09
28	Jack Meijer	Great Britain	19:09
29	Mario García	Spain	19:12
30	Pasquale Selvarolo	Italy	19:12
31	Manuel Peris	Spain	19:12
32	Tom Mortimer	Great Britain	19:13
33	Andrii Krakovetskyi	Ukraine	19:13
34	Enrico Vecchi	Italy	19:14
35	Maël Gouyette	France	19:14
36	István Palkovits	Hungary	19:15
37	Jannik Weiß	Germany	19:15
38	Duarte Gomes	Portugal	19:15
39	Pietro Arese	Italy	19:15
40	Robin van Riel	Netherlands	19:17
41	Luca Alfieri	Italy	19:18
42	Elias Schreml	Germany	19:19
43	Illian Martens	Netherlands	19:19
44	Abdullah Özdemir	Turkey	19:19
45	Leevi Keronen	Finland	19:19
46	Mika Kotiranta	Finland	19:21
47	Enrique Herreros	Spain	19:22
48	Andrés Rodríguez	Spain	19:22
49	Alain Cavagna	Italy	19:23
50	Aliaksandr Shustsik	Belarus	19:24
51	Theo Lapouge	France	19:24
52	Nahuel Carabaña	Andorra	19:26
53	Markus Kirk Kjeldsen	Denmark	19:27
54	Anton Østdal	Denmark	19:27
55	Emil Millán de la Oliva	Sweden	19:29
56	Luuk Maas	Netherlands	19:30
57	Julien Stalhandske	Switzerland	19:30
58	Mikołaj Czeronek	Poland	19:30
59	Jonatan Andersen Vedvik	Norway	19:31
60	Micheal Power	Ireland	19:32
61	Maksym Panteleyev	Ukraine	19:33
62	Isaac Nader	Portugal	19:35
63	Albert Kokaly	Austria	19:35
64	Giedrius Valinčius	Lithuania	19:37
65	Ahmet Mutlu	Turkey	19:37
66	Joan Tapias	Spain	19:39
67	Nuno Pereira	Portugal	19:39
68	Bjarne Kölle	Switzerland	19:40
69	Bartosz Jarczok	Poland	19:40
70	Magnus Nyman Hall	Denmark	19:41
71	Rory Leonard	Great Britain	19:46
72	Loris Pellaz	Switzerland	19:48
73	Karlo Ciban	Croatia	19:50
74	Simon Steinshamn	Norway	19:50
75	Fintan Stewart	Ireland	19:50
76	Imran Balouma	France	19:52
77	Nesim Amsellek	Italy	19:52
78	René Sasyn	Czech Republic	19:53
79	Artūrs Niklāvs Medveds	Latvia	19:54
80	Maurice Christen	Switzerland	19:56
81	Nikolaos Sakis	Greece	19:59
82	Matevž Cimermančič	Slovenia	20:02
83	Nicola Hagger	Switzerland	20:04
84	Thomas Vanoppen	Belgium	20:05
85	Vadym Lonskyi	Ukraine	20:06
86	Daire Finn	Ireland	20:08
87	Miguel Ribeiro	Portugal	20:09
88	Elias Ariel Aarestrup Shifris	Denmark	20:11
89	Illya Sosnytskyy	Ukraine	20:11
90	Mustafe Muuse	Finland	20:17
91	Matija Rizmal	Slovenia	20:17
92	Yves Florent Cornillie	Switzerland	20:22
93	Zlatko Kožuhar	Croatia	20:57
94	Aljaž Renko	Slovenia	21:11
95	Lovro Nedeljković	Croatia	22:52
	Tomislav Novosel	Croatia	DNF

Team race
Rank	Team	Points
1st place, gold medalist(s)	Norway; Jakob Ingebrigtsen, Simen Halle Haugen, Håkon Stavik, Jonatan Andersen Vedvik, Simon Steinshamn	1+5+22=28
2nd place, silver medalist(s)	Great Britain; Jake Heyward, Isaac Akers, Mathew Willis, Jack Meijer, Tom Mortimer, Rory Leonard	4+12+14=30
3rd place, bronze medalist(s)	Germany; Mohamed Mohumed, Nick Jäger, Dominik Müller, Jannik Weiß, Elias Schreml	6+9+23=38
4	France; Mohamed-Amine Kodad, Valentin Bresc, Arthur Gervais, Maël Gouyette, Theo Lapouge, Imran Balouma	7+10+24=41
5	Ireland; Darragh McElhinney, Seán O'Leary, Jamie Battle, Micheal Power, Fintan Stewart, Daire Finn	16+18+21=55
6	Netherlands; Bram Anderiessen, Ryan Oosting, Tim Verbaandert, Robin van Riel, Illian Martens, Luuk Maas	11+19+26=56
7	Spain; Ouassim Oumaiz, Mario García, Manuel Peris, Enrique Herreros, Andrés Rodríguez, Joan Tapias	2+29+31=62
8	Turkey; Ayetullah Aslanhan, Ramazan Baştuğ, Abdullah Özdemir, Ahmet Mutlu	8+13+44=65
9	Italy; Pasquale Selvarolo, Enrico Vecchi, Pietro Arese, Luca Alfieri, Alain Cavagna, Nesim Amsellek	30+34+39=103
10	Belgium; Tim Van De Velde, Lucas Da Silva, Thomas Vanoppen	15+27+84=126
11	Portugal; Duarte Gomes, Isaac Nader, Nuno Pereira, Miguel Ribeiro	38+62+67=167
12	Denmark; Markus Kirk Kjeldsen, Anton Østdal, Magnus Nyman Hall, Elias Ariel Aarestrup Shifris	53+54+70=177
13	Ukraine; Andrii Krakovetskyi, Maksym Panteleyev, Vadym Lonskyi, Illya Sosnytskyy	33+61+85=179
14	Finland; Leevi Keronen, Mika Kotiranta, Mustafe Muuse	45+46+90=181
15	Switzerland; Julien Stalhandske, Bjarne Kölle, Loris Pellaz, Maurice Christen, Nicola Hagger, Yves Florent Cornillie	57+68+72=197
16	Croatia; Karlo Ciban, Zlatko Kožuhar, Lovro Nedeljković, Tomislav Novosel	73+93+95=261
17	Slovenia; Matevž Cimermančič, Matija Rizmal, Aljaž Renko	82+91+94=267

=== U20 women ===
Individual race
Rank	Athlete	Country	Time (m:s)
1st place, gold medalist(s)	Nadia Battocletti	Italy	13:46
2nd place, silver medalist(s)	Delia Sclabas	Switzerland	13:47
3rd place, bronze medalist(s)	İnci Kalkan	Turkey	13:48
4	Jasmijn Lau	Netherlands	13:51
5	Amelia Quirk	Great Britain	13:57
6	Carla Gallardo	Spain	13:58
7	Khahisa Mhlanga	Great Britain	14:00
8	Emma O'Brien	Ireland	14:01
9	Sarah Healy	Ireland	14:03
10	Famke Heinst	Netherlands	14:04
11	Grace Brock	Great Britain	14:05
12	Sibylle Häring	Switzerland	14:06
13	Cari Hughes	Great Britain	14:10
14	Roos Blokhuis	Netherlands	14:11
15	Mariana Machado	Portugal	14:12
16	Cristina Ruiz	Spain	14:12
17	Emine Akbingöl	Turkey	14:16
18	Elisa Palmero	Italy	14:19
19	Derya Kunur	Turkey	14:22
20	Anna MacFadyen	Great Britain	14:22
21	Laia Casajoana	Spain	14:23
22	Ludovica Cavalli	Italy	14:23
23	Lisa Oed	Germany	14:24
24	Elia Saura	Spain	14:25
25	Stephanie Cotter	Ireland	14:25
26	Carolina Hernandez-Pita	Switzerland	14:27
27	Moona Korkealaakso	Finland	14:27
28	Sandra Šrut	Croatia	14:28
29	Diane van Es	Netherlands	14:29
30	Isabel Barreiro	Spain	14:30
31	Klara Lukan	Slovenia	14:30
32	Mélody Julien	France	14:31
33	Mathilde Deswaef	Belgium	14:32
34	Joceline Wind	Switzerland	14:32
35	Jodie McCann	Ireland	14:33
36	Tiffany Penfold	Great Britain	14:33
37	Paula Schneiders	Germany	14:34
38	Anneke Vortmeier	Germany	14:34
39	Ana Patricia Campos Moreno	Spain	14:36
40	Jasmijn Bakker	Netherlands	14:38
41	Astrid Snäll	Finland	14:39
42	Francesca Marangi Agostino	Italy	14:40
43	Eliza Megger	Poland	14:40
44	Anna Mark Helwigh	Denmark	14:40
45	Katarina Vukančič	Croatia	14:41
46	Kristine Mygind Sørensen	Denmark	14:41
47	Laura Valgreen Petersen	Denmark	14:41
48	Patricia Silva	Portugal	14:42
49	Lia Lemos	Portugal	14:44
50	Martina Cornia	Italy	14:45
51	Anna Hightower	Netherlands	14:47
52	Laura Giudice	Switzerland	14:47
53	Laura Taborda	Portugal	14:48
54	Carina Reicht	Austria	14:48
55	Sara Benfares	France	14:51
56	Eugenie Morel	France	14:51
57	Greta Karinauskaitė	Lithuania	14:52
58	Manon Trapp	France	14:52
59	Febe Triest	Belgium	14:54
60	Sophie O'Sullivan	Ireland	14:59
61	Laura Nicholson	Ireland	15:00
62	Bohdana Semyonova	Ukraine	15:00
63	Aita Ammann	Switzerland	15:01
64	Annasophie Drees	Germany	15:01
65	Klaudia Pawlus	Poland	15:01
66	Jenipher Contois	France	15:02
67	Klara Koppe	Germany	15:02
68	Dafni-Eftychia-Tereza Lavasa	Greece	15:02
69	Adéla Koláčková	Czech Republic	15:03
70	Elena Dušková	Slovakia	15:04
71	Salla Laukkanen	Finland	15:10
72	Sophie Søefeldt	Denmark	15:11
73	Ugnė Žvinklytė	Lithuania	15:12
74	Leonarda Farkaš	Croatia	15:13
75	Angela Mattevi	Italy	15:15
76	Ivanna Kukh	Ukraine	15:18
77	Angela Veronica Olenici	Romania	15:20
78	Sabriye Güzelyurt	Turkey	15:28
79	Paula Rakijašić	Croatia	15:28
80	Viktoriya Kovba	Ukraine	15:33
81	Alexandra Závadská	Slovakia	15:33
82	Meda Repšytė	Lithuania	15:38
83	Efstathia Florou	Greece	15:41
84	Dominyka Petraškaitė	Lithuania	15:43
85	Daria Vdovychenko	Ukraine	16:34
86	Anna Marija Petrakova	Latvia	16:44
	Alessia Zarbo	France	DNS
	Špela Gonza	Slovenia	DNF
	Ramunė Klybaitė	Lithuania	DNF

Team race
Rank	Team	Points
1st place, gold medalist(s)	Great Britain; Amelia Quirk, Khahisa Mhlanga, Grace Brock, Cari Hughes, Anna MacFadyen, Tiffany Penfold	5+7+11=23
2nd place, silver medalist(s)	Netherlands; Jasmijn Lau, Famke Heinst, Roos Blokhuis, Diane van Es, Jasmijn Bakker, Anna Hightower	4+10+14=28
3rd place, bronze medalist(s)	Turkey; İnci Kalkan, Emine Akbingöl, Derya Kunur, Sabriye Güzelyurt	3+17+19=39
4	Switzerland; Delia Sclabas, Sibylle Häring, Carolina Hernandez-Pita, Joceline Wind, Laura Giudice, Aita Ammann	2+12+26=40
5	Italy; Nadia Battocletti, Elisa Palmero, Ludovica Cavalli, Francesca Marangi Agostino, Martina Cornia, Angela Mattevi	1+18+22=41
6	Ireland; Emma O'Brien, Sarah Healy, Stephanie Cotter, Jodie McCann, Sophie O'Sullivan, Laura Nicholson	8+9+25=42
7	Spain; Carla Gallardo, Cristina Ruiz, Laia Casajoana, Elia Saura, Isabel Barreiro, Ana Patricia Campos Moreno	6+16+21=43
8	Germany; Lisa Oed, Paula Schneiders, Anneke Vortmeier, Annasophie Drees, Klara Koppe	23+37+38=98
9	Portugal; Mariana Machado, Patricia Silva, Lia Lemos, Laura Taborda	15+48+49=112
10	Denmark; Anna Mark Helwigh, Kristine Mygind Sørensen, Laura Valgreen Petersen, Sophie Søefeldt	44+46+47=137
11	Finland; Moona Korkealaakso, Astrid Snäll, Salla Laukkanen	27+41+71=139
12	France; Mélody Julien, Sara Benfares, Eugenie Morel, Manon Trapp, Jenipher Contois, Alessia Zarbo	32+55+56=143
13	Croatia; Sandra Šrut, Katarina Vukančič, Leonarda Farkaš, Paula Rakijašić	28+45+74=147
14	Lithuania; Greta Karinauskaitė, Ugnė Žvinklytė, Meda Repšytė, Dominyka Petraškaitė, Ramunė Klybaitė	57+73+82=212
15	Ukraine; Bohdana Semyonova, Ivanna Kukh, Viktoriya Kovba, Daria Vdovychenko	62+76+80=218
