= 2021 Belgian Athletics Championships =

- Dates: 26–27 June
- Host city: Brussels, Belgium
- Venue: King Baudouin Stadium
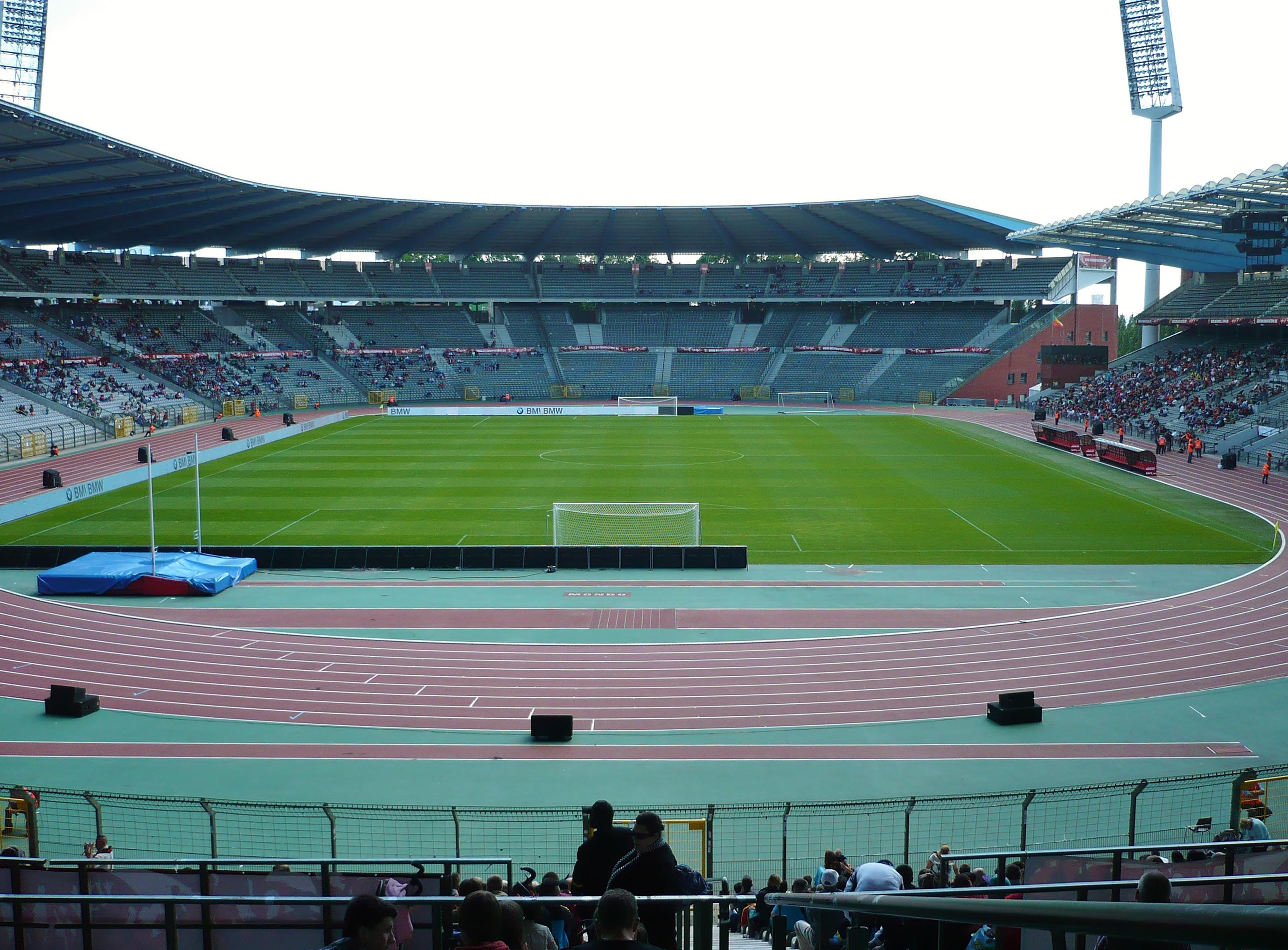

The 2021 Belgian Athletics Championships (Dutch: Belgische kampioenschappen atletiek 2021, French: Championnats de Belgique d'athlétisme 2021) was the year's national outdoor track and field championships for Belgium. It was held from 26 to 27 June at the King Baudouin Stadium in Brussels, with the exception of the hammer throw events which took place in Kessel-Lo. The national championships in 10,000 metres and women's 3000 metres steeplechase took place on Saturday 12 June in Gentbrugge.

== Results ==
=== Men ===
Event	Gold		Silver		Bronze	
100 metres	Kobe Vleminckx	10.65	Ward Merckx	10.71	Gaylord Kuba Di-Vita	10.74
200 metres	Robin Vanderbemden	21.08	Amine Kasmi	21.11	Yoran Deschepper	21.35
400 metres	Alexander Doom	45.34	Jonathan Sacoor	46.06	Dylan Borlée	46.08
800 metres	Eliott Crestan	1:48.45	Aurèle Vandeputte	1:48.79	Tibo De Smet	1:49.28
1500 metres	Peter Callahan	3:40.51	Ruben Verheyden	3:44.73	Sven Bombeke	3:45.59
5000 metres	Soufiane Bouchikhi	13:33.98	Michael Somers	13:39.53	Sander Vercauteren	14:08.52
10,000 metres	Lucas Da Silva	29:38.50	Steven Casteele	29:44.48	Bjarne Rasschaert	29:54.64
110 m hurdles	Michael Obasuyi	13.32	François Grailet	13.93	Nolan Vancauwemberghe	14.13
400 m hurdles	Tuur Bras	50.58	Dries Van Nieuwenhove	50.73	Dylan Owusu	51.54
3000 m s'chase	Tim Van de Velde	9:06.03	Lucas Da Silva	9:11.62	Lucas Lievens	9:21.96
Long jump	Mathias Broothaerts	7.50 m (-0.3 m/s)	Arnaud Caluwe	7.24 m (+1.4 m/s)	Kwinten Torfs	7.19 m (+0.7 m/s)
Triple jump	Björn De Decker	15.09 m (+0.8 m/s)	Desire Kingunza	14.91 m (+0.2 m/s)	Gregory Geerts	14.51 m (+1.2 m/s)
High jump	Thomas Carmoy	2.23 m	Giebe Algoet	2.15 m	Arne Min	2.15 m
Pole vault	Robin Bodart	5.25 m	Thomas Van Nuffelen	5.00 m	Frederik Ausloos Pierre Straet	4.60 m
Shot put	Matthias Quintelier	18.10 m	Philip Milanov	17.32 m	Jarno Wagemans	15.66 m
Discus throw	Philip Milanov	61.36 m	Lars Coene	49.32 m	Edwin Nys	48.68 m
Javelin throw	Timothy Herman	71.52 m	Jonas De Busscher	62.16 m	Bram Van der Reysen	61.59 m
Hammer throw	Rémi Malengreaux	64.00 m	Kobe Gieghase	58.03 m	Orry Willems	57.58 m

=== Women ===
Event	Gold		Silver		Bronze	
100 metres	Rani Rosius	11.39	Alizée Morency Poilvache	11.71	Cloé Chavepeyer	11.72
200 metres	Imke Vervaet	23.30	Rani Rosius	23.49	Manon Depuydt	23.70
400 metres	Naomi Van Den Broeck	52.72	Camille Laus	53.41	Hanne Maudens	53.43
800 metres	Camille Muls	2:05.85	Vanessa Scaunet	2:06.16	Rani Baillievier	2:06.77
1500 metres	Elise Vanderelst	4:15.09	Sofie Van Accom	4:16.33	Lindsey De Grande	4:17.92
5000 metres	Febe Triest	16:34.26	Florence De Cock	16:36.59	Juliette Thomas	16:51.74
10,000 metres	Florence De Cock	34:26.65	Lore Tack	35:49.84	Marta Alexandra Chylinski	36:36.48
100 m hurdles	Anne Zagré	12.94	Eline Berings	13.26	Siliane Vancauwemberghe	13.86
400 m hurdles	Hanne Claes	57.28	Ilana Hanssens	59.68	Margaux Bastil	60.30
3000 m s'chase	Eline Dalemans	10:41.21	Chiara Wastijn	11:36.51	Zarah Steurbaut	11:37.70
Long jump	Bo Brasseur	6.04 m (-0.3 m/s)	Stefanie Brosens	6.04 m (+0.3 m/s)	Ilona Masson	5.97 m (-1.1 m/s)
Triple jump	Elsa Loureiro	12.89 m (+0.0 m/s)	Ilona Masson	12.70 m (+1.2 m/s)	Sietske Lenchant	12.36 m (+1.2 m/s)
High jump	Zita Goossens	1.90 m	Merel Maes	1.88 m	Claire Orcel	1.88 m
Pole vault	Fanny Smets	4.40 m	Chloé Henry	4.20 m	Fleur Hooyberghs	4.10 m
Shot put	Elena Defrère	15.18 m	Nafissatou Thiam	14.99 m	Sietske Lenchant	13.54 m
Discus throw	Babette Vandeput	51.45 m	Anouska Hellebuyck	49.92 m	Katelijne Lyssens	49.71 m
Javelin throw	Pauline Smal	46.23 m	Sarah Vermeir	43.54 m	Cassandre Evans	43.17 m
Hammer throw	Vanessa Sterckendries	68.92 m	Ilke Lagrou	57.57 m	Evi Vercruysse	51.89 m
