= 2018 Belgian Athletics Championships =

- Dates: 7–8 July
- Host city: Brussels, Belgium
- Venue: King Baudouin Stadium
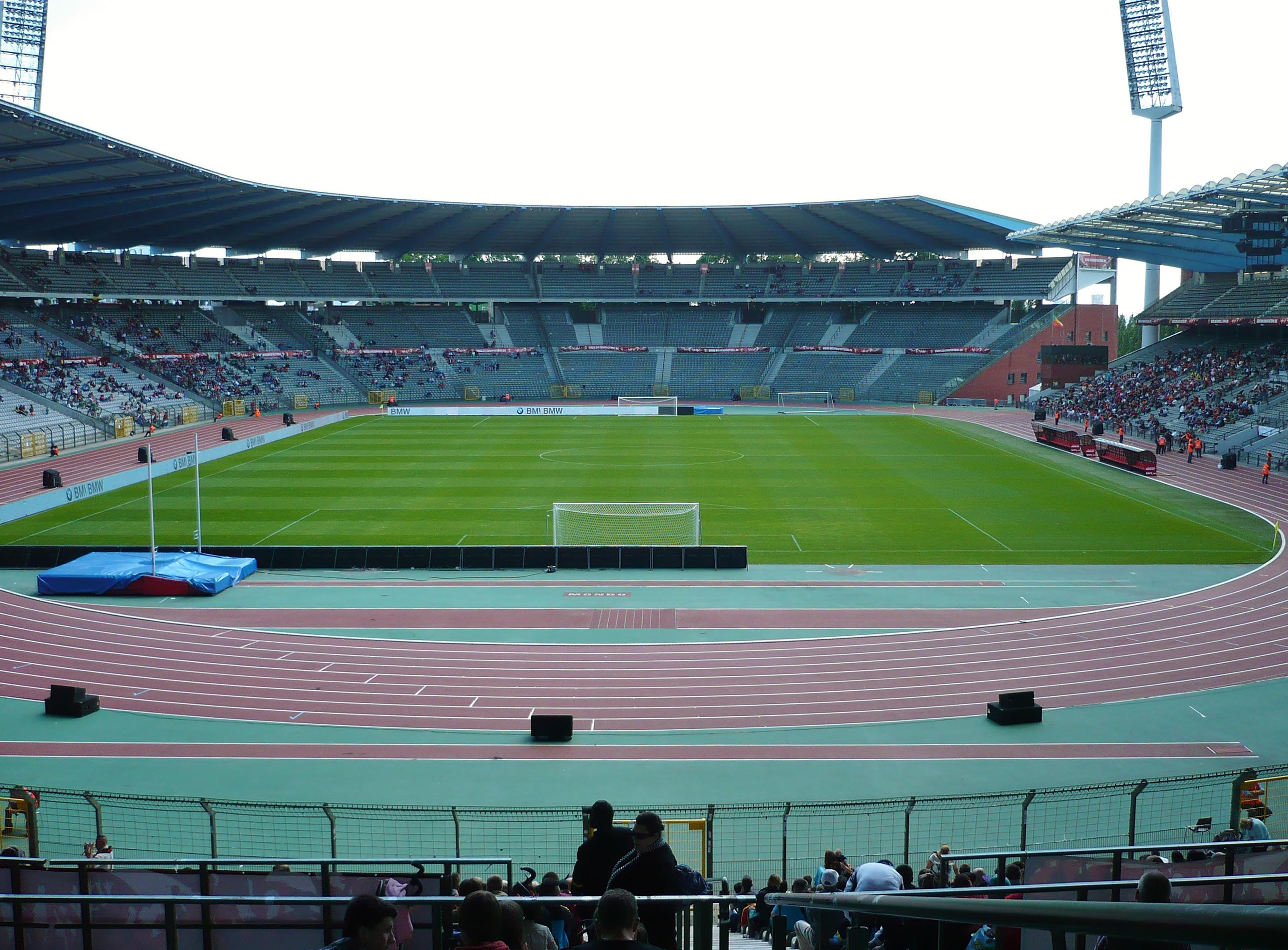

The 2018 Belgian Athletics Championships (Dutch: Belgische kampioenschappen atletiek 2018, French: Championnats de Belgique d'athlétisme 2018) was the year's national outdoor track and field championships for Belgium. It was held on 7 and 8 July at the King Baudouin Stadium in Brussels.

The 10,000 m for men and women and the 3000 m steeplechase for women were held separately in Naimette-Xhovémont on 5 May. The hammer throw events took place in Nivelles. It served as the selection meeting for Belgium at the 2018 European Athletics Championships.

== Results ==
=== Men ===
Event	Gold		Silver		Bronze	
100 metres	Andreas Vranken	10.49	Guelord Kola Biasu	10.50	Jean-Marie Louis	10.53
200 metres	Jonathan Borlée	20.78	Kobe Vleminckx	20.96	Arnout Matthijs	21.15
400 metres	Kevin Borlée	45.52	Dylan Borlée	45.55	Robin Vanderbemden	46.09
800 metres	Aaron Botterman	1:46.89	Thomas Engels	1:50.10	Arthur Bruyneel	1:50.30
1500 metres	Pieter Claus	3:53.84	Ali Hamdi	3:54.32	Michael Somers	3:54.43
5000 metres	Jennen Mortier	14:20.11	Thomas De Bock	14:22.51	Kim Ruell	14:23.11
10,000 metres	Nick Van Peborgh	29:46.87	Stijn De Vulder	30:09.58	Clement Deflandre	30:24.32
110 m hurdles	Dylan Caty	14.11	Denis Hanjoul	14.18	Jordi Van Den Eynden	14.26
400 m hurdles	Romain Nicodème	51.49	Dylan Owusu	51.67	Jasper De Vooght	52.58
3000 m s'chase	Clement Deflandre	8:57.87	Mathijs Casteele	9:05.34	Jill De Brauwer	9:13.33
Long jump	Corentin Campener	7.66 m (+1.0 m/s)	François Grailet	7.56 m (+0.5 m/s)	Vincent Stas	7.43 m (+0.2 m/s)
Triple jump	Leopold Kapata	15.73 m (-0.9 m/s)	Nicolas Thomas	14.80 m (+0.5 m/s)	Gregory Geerts	14.68 m (-0.5 m/s)
High jump	Bram Ghuys	2.24 m	Giebe Algoet	2.07 m	Brett Jacobs	2.04 m
Pole vault	Arnaud Art	5.40 m	Ben Broeders	5.30 m	Frederik Ausloos	5.30 m
Shot put	Philip Milanov	17.29 m	Matthias Quintelier	16.77 m	Stijn Spilliaert	15.91 m
Discus throw	Philip Milanov	63.39 m	Edwin Nys	53.11 m	Stijn Spilliaert	50.82 m
Javelin throw	Timothy Herman	75.62 m	Jarne Duchateau	64.67 m	Michael Boa	64.67 m
Hammer throw	Remi Malengreaux	61.86 m	Stef Vanbroekhoven	56.66 m	Walter De Wyngaert	53.62 m

=== Women ===
Event	Gold		Silver		Bronze	
100 metres	Manon Depuydt	11.72	Laures Bauwens	11.99	Elise Mehuys	12.03
200 metres	Cynthia Bolingo Mbongo	23.68	Lucie Ferauge	24.10	Elise Mehuys	24.32
400 metres	Marlien De Jans	54.92	Ine Hugaerts	56.40	Marie Fickers	56.57
800 metres	Lotte Hellinckx	2:11.22	Eléa Henrard	2:11.39	Riet Vanfleteren	2:11.91
1500 metres	Sofie Van Accom	4:18.12	Lisa Rooms	4:24.22	Vanessa Scaunet	4:28.54
5000 metres	Nina Lauwaert	16:14.25	Hanne Verbruggen	16:32.61	Hanna Vandenbussche	16:38.41
10,000 metres	Hanne Verbruggen	35:11.55	Kim Geypen	35:18.98	Maureen Kramer	36:16.14
100 m hurdles	Eline Berings	12.98	Anne Zagré	13.15	Sarah Missinne	13.33
400 m hurdles	Hanne Claes	55.20	Margo Van Puyvelde	56.13	Justien Grillet	56.31
3000 m s'chase	Elke Godden	10:58.59	Jolien Van Hoorebeke	12:24.82	Charlotte Sijmens	12:36.76
Long jump	Nafissatou Thiam	6.60 m (-0.1 m/s)	Hanne Maudens	6.51 m (+1.1 m/s)	Bo Nijs	5.74 m (-0.4 m/s)
Triple jump	Sietske Lenchant	12.63 m (-0.8 m/s)	Saliyya Guisse	12.58 m (+0.8 m/s)	Elsa Loureiro	12.27 m (-1.1 m/s)
High jump	Claire Orcel	1.91 m	Hanne Van Hessche	1.74 m	Eline Nenin	1.71 m
Pole vault	Aurélie De Ryck	4.20 m	Chloé Henry	4.20 m	Melanie Vissers	4.10 m
Shot put	Yoika De Pauw	13.47 m	Hanne Maudens	13.06 m	Sophie Verlinden	12.89 m
Discus throw	Katelijne Lyssens	50.71 m	Babette Vandeput	49.86 m	Anouska Hellebuyck	49.47 m
Javelin throw	Pauline Smal	46.89 m	Nele Meylemans	45.26 m	Yoika De Pauw	43.94 m
Hammer throw	Vanessa Sterckendries	65.69 m	Ilke Lagrou	54.19 m	Wege Vanbaelenberghe	50.36 m
