= 2020 Belgian Athletics Championships =

- Dates: 14 August–16 August
- Host city: Brussels, Belgium
- Venue: King Baudouin Stadium
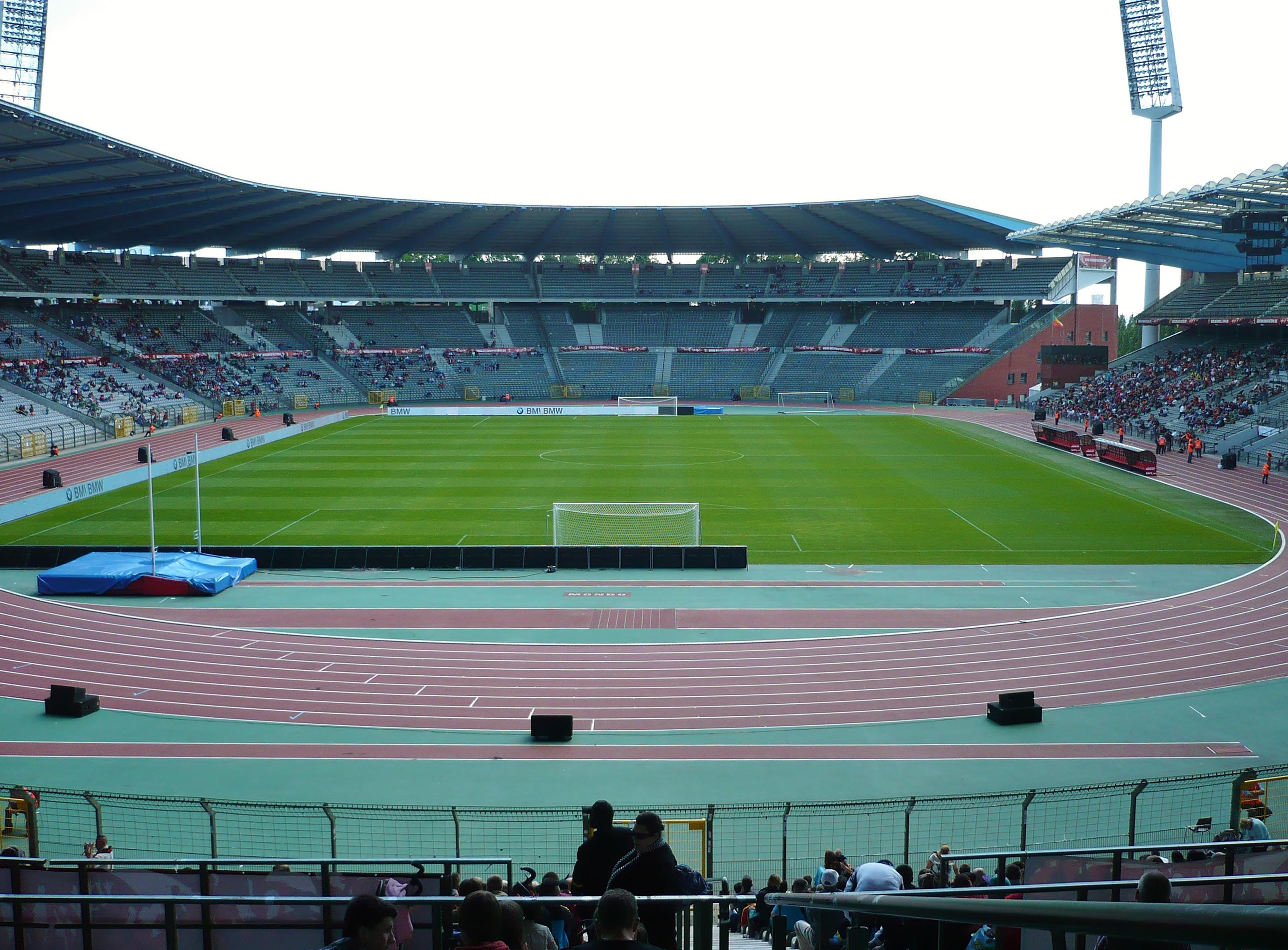

The 2020 Belgian Athletics Championships (Dutch: Belgische kampioenschappen atletiek 2020, French: Championnats de Belgique d'athlétisme 2020) was the year's national outdoor track and field championships for Belgium. These were held from 14 August to 16 August at the King Baudouin Stadium in Brussels, with the exception of the hammer throw events which took place in Kessel-Lo. The national championships in 10,000 metres and women's 3000 metres steeplechase took place on Saturday 27 September in Braine-l'Alleud. Due to the COVID-19 pandemic, no supporters were present at any of the events.

== Results ==
=== Men ===
Event	Gold		Silver		Bronze	
100 metres	Kobe Vleminckx	10.43	Robin Vanderbemden	10.51	Kevin Borlée	10.62
200 metres	Julien Watrin	21.15	Jordan Paquot	21.63	Yoran Deschepper	21.67
400 metres	Christian Iguacel	46.80	Camille Snyders	47.26	Sven Van Den Bergh	47.40
800 metres	Eliott Crestan	1:49.89	Aurele Vandeputte	1:50.35	Tibo De Smet	1:50.45
1500 metres	Ismael Debjani	3:47.47	Thomas Vanoppen	3:47.91	Ruben Verheyden	3:48.82
5000 metres	Ward D'Hoore	14:08.92	Lahsene Bouchikhi	14:10.97	Steven Casteele	14:11.45
10,000 metres	Mats Lunders	29:29.92	Nicolaï Saké	29:34.06	Clement Deflandre	29:34.60
110 m hurdles	Michael Obasuyi	13.82	François Grailet	14.45	Ewout Dumon	14.67
400 m hurdles	Tuur Bras	50.69	Dylan Owusu	51.37	Dries Van Nieuwenhove	51.49
3000 m s'chase	Clement Deflandre	9:08.61	Ulysse Lenoir	9:12.91	Marco Vanderpoorten	9:19.06
Long jump	Daniel Segers	7.89 m	Mathias Broothaerts	7.51 m	Corentin Campener	7.44 m
Triple jump	Bjorn De Decker	14.67 m	Matthias De Leenheer	14.20 m	Desiré Kingunza	14.15 m
High jump	Thomas Carmoy	2.25 m	Lars Van Looy	2.15 m	Jef Vermeiren	2.09 m
Pole vault	Ben Broeders	5.60 m	Robin Bodart	5.00 m	Thomas Van Nuffelen Jules Vanlangenaker	4.90 m 4.90 m
Shot put	Philip Milanov	16.65 m	Matthias Quintelier	16.64 m	Jarno Wagemans	15.36 m
Discus throw	Philip Milanov	60.16 m	Edwin Nys	49.66 m	Stijn Spilliaert	49.06 m
Javelin throw	Timothy Herman	77.53 m	Cedric Sorgeloos	73.41 m	Michael Boa	60.16 m
Hammer throw	Remi Malengreaux	63.19 m	Stef Vanbroekhoven	62.42 m	Kobe Gieghase	59.19 m
Decathlon	Niels Pittomvils	7516 pts	Dimitri Montilla	7013 pts	Sander Maes	6703 pts

=== Women ===
Event	Gold		Silver		Bronze	
100 metres	Rani Rosius	11.39	Cynthia Bolingo	11.63	Imke Vervaet	11.68
200 metres	Imke Vervaet	23.42	Cynthia Bolingo	23.43	Rani Rosius	23.90
400 metres	Camille Laus	53.13	Elise Lasser	54.30	Liefde Schoemaker	54.51
800 metres	Renée Eykens	2:03.90	Mariska Parewyk	2:05.74	Vanessa Scaunet	2:06.16
1500 metres	Elise Vanderelst	4:18.69	Sofie Van Accom	4:22.79	Jenna Wyns	4:24.63
5000 metres	Nina Lauwaert	16:31.36	Britt Vanthillo	17:14.53	Lindsey De Grande	17:14.71
10,000 metres	Hanne Verbruggen	34:29.98	Florence De Cock	34:31.56	Mieke Gorissen	34:32.58
100 m hurdles	Anne Zagré	13.07	Sarah Missinne	13.37	Chloé Beaucarne	13.59
400 m hurdles	Paulien Couckuyt	56.14	Eline Claeys	57.80	Kylie Lambert	60.08
3000 m s'chase	Eline Dalemans	10:05.02	Sofie Gallein	11:09.55	Jolien Van Hoorebeke	11:25.39
Long jump	Bo Brasseur	5.98 m	Ilona Masson	5.93 m	Anne-dominique Baramoto	5.78 m
Triple jump	Elsa Loureiro	12.79 m	Saliyya Guisse	12.75 m	Ilona Masson	12.48 m
High jump	Merel Maes	1.84 m	Zita Goossens	1.82 m	Yorunn Ligneel	1.74 m
Pole vault	Elien Vekemans	4.20 m	Melanie Vissers	4.10 m	Lola Lepere	4.00 m
Shot put	Myrthe Van Der Borght	14.28 m	Elise Helsen	13.69 m	Elena Defrere	13.50 m
Discus throw	Katelijne Lyssens	51.48 m	Anouska Hellebuyck	50.94 m	Emilie Dodrimont	48.52 m
Javelin throw	Cassandre Evans	44.24 m	Ann Telemans	43.84 m	Nele Meylemans	42.25 m
Hammer throw	Vanessa Sterckendries	67.62 m	Ilke Lagrou	56.89 m	Nele Lambrecht	46.44 m
Heptathlon	Hanne Maudens	6167 pts	Stefanie Brosens	5230 pts	Yoika De Pauw	4929 pts
