= 2019 Belgian Athletics Championships =

- Dates: 31 August–1 September
- Host city: Brussels, Belgium
- Venue: King Baudouin Stadium
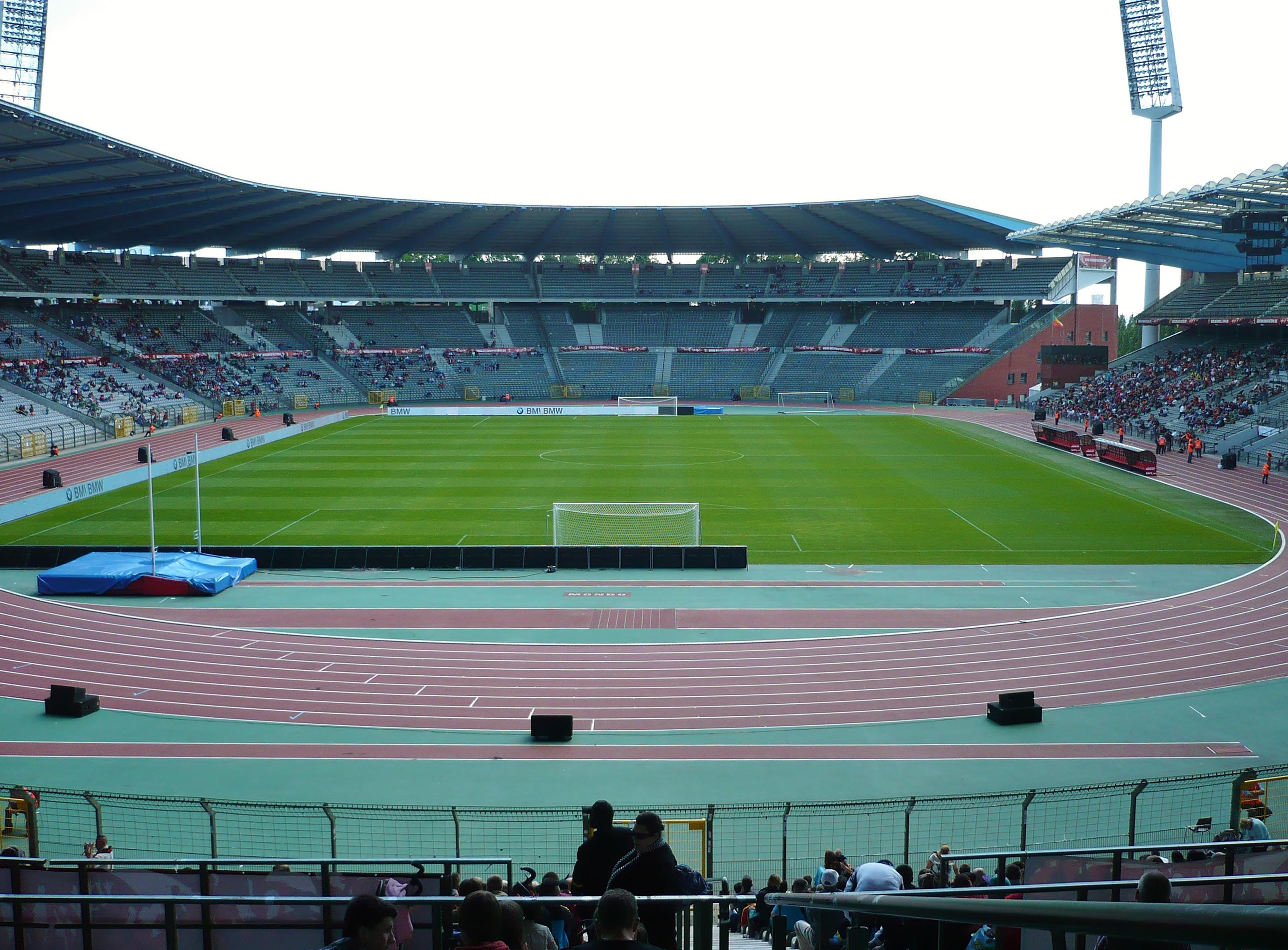

The 2019 Belgian Athletics Championships (Dutch: Belgische kampioenschappen atletiek 2019, French: Championnats de Belgique d'athlétisme 2019) was the year's national outdoor track and field championships for Belgium. It was held on 31 August and 1 September at the King Baudouin Stadium in Brussels.

The national championships in 10,000 metres and women's 3000 metres steeplechase took place on Saturday 4 May in Oudenaarde. Hammer throw events took place in Nivelles.

== Results ==
=== Men ===
Event	Gold		Silver		Bronze	
100 metres	Kobe Vleminckx	10.61	Gaylord Kuba Di Vita	10.62	Charles Niesen	10.73
200 metres	Robin Vanderbemden	20.87	Jonathan Borlée	21.02	Simon Verherstraeten	21.63
400 metres	Jonathan Sacoor	45.31	Kevin Borlée	45.61	Dylan Borlée	45.73
800 metres	Eliott Crestan	1:48.43	Aaron Botterman	1:49.00	Aurèle Vandeputte	1:49.20
1500 metres	Pieter Claus	3:51.29	Tim Van De Velde	3:51.65	Ruben Verheyden	3:51.74
5000 metres	Michael Somers	14:15.34	Ward D'hoore	14:15.90	Steven Casteele	14:25.05
10,000 metres	Régis Thonon	29:46.15	Mathijs Casteele	29:48.41	Steven Casteele	30:04.50
110 m hurdles	Michael Obasuyi	13.57	Denis Hanjoul	14.10	Nolan Vancauwemberghe	14.57
400 m hurdles	Julien Watrin	49.92	Dylan Owusu	50.93	Tuur Bras	51.57
3000 m s'chase	Mathijs Casteele	9:15.28	Marco Vanderpoorten	9:27.97	Jill De Brauwer	9:30.10
Long jump	Mathias Broothaerts	7.64 m (+0.2 m/s)	Corentin Campener	7.55 m (+0.5 m/s)	François Grailet	7.34 m (-0.5 m/s)
Triple jump	Björn De Decker	14.61 m (+1.0 m/s)	Desire Kingunza	14.35 m (+0.1 m/s)	Matthias De Leenheer	14.04 m (+0.1 m/s)
High jump	Thomas Carmoy	2.20 m	Bram Ghuys	2.11 m	Jef Vermeiren	2.11 m
Pole vault	Ben Broeders	5.51 m	Arnaud Art	5.01 m	Diego Secci	4.91 m
Shot put	Matthias Quintelier	17.31 m	Max Vlassak	17.26 m	Stijn Spilliaert	16.97 m
Discus throw	Philip Milanov	60.33 m	Edwin Nys	52.99 m	Stijn Spilliaert	52.95 m
Javelin throw	Timothy Herman	78.37 m	Cedric Sorgeloos	71.31 m	Niel Mory	66.06 m
Hammer throw	Remi Malengreaux	61.01 m	Stef Vanbroekhoven	60.52 m	Claudio Salvaggio	57.03 m

=== Women ===
Event	Gold		Silver		Bronze	
100 metres	Manon Depuydt	11.61	Rani Rosius	11.67	Laures Bauwens	11.96
200 metres	Imke Vervaet	23.25	Manon Depuydt	23.26	Rani Rosius	24.17
400 metres	Camille Laus	52.27	Elise Lasser	54.17	Kine Gaye	54.28
800 metres	Renée Eykens	2:02.47	Camille Muls	2:06.37	Louise Hayez	2:08.93
1500 metres	Jenna Wyns	4:21.22	Lindsey De Grande	4:22.00	Zenobie Vangansbeke	4:24.71
5000 metres	Lisa Rooms	16:31.35	Hanne Verbruggen	16:33.98	Eline Dalemans	17:10.53
10,000 metres	Nina Lauwaert	33:49.47	Karen Van Proeyen	35:06.55	Ameli Saussez	36:12.80
100 m hurdles	Anne Zagré	13.10	Nafissatou Thiam	13.36	Eline Berings	13.38
400 m hurdles	Hanne Claes	55.36	Paulien Couckuyt	55.46	Nenah De Coninck	58.73
3000 m s'chase	Eline Dalemans	10:22.94	Antse Meylaers	11:09.41	Jolien Van Hoorebeke	11:11.38
Long jump	Hanne Maudens	5.97 m (-0.6 m/s)	Maite Beernaert	5.93 m (0.0 m/s)	Sietske Lenchant	5.75 m (+0.7 m/s)
Triple jump	Elsa Loureiro	12.83 m (+0.5 m/s)	Sietske Lenchant	12.57 m (+0.6 m/s)	Ine Mylle	12.28 m (+0.5 m/s)
High jump	Claire Orcel	1.86 m	Zita Goossens	1.74 m	Osaratin Kefayetou	1.71 m
Pole vault	Fanny Smets	4.21 m	Aurélie De Ryck	4.21 m	Melanie Vissers	3.91 m
Shot put	Elena Defrere	13.97 m	Yoika De Pauw	13.94 m	Elise Helsen	13.49 m
Discus throw	Anouska Hellebuyck	50.69 m	Katelijne Lyssens	46.36 m	Elena Defrere	44.25 m
Javelin throw	Sarah Vermeir	48.64 m	Yoika De Pauw	43.79 m	Ann Telemans	43.79 m
Hammer throw	Vanessa Sterckendries	64.77 m	Ilke Lagrou	54.40 m	Evi Vercruysse	49.78 m
