= 2020 Belgian Indoor Athletics Championships =

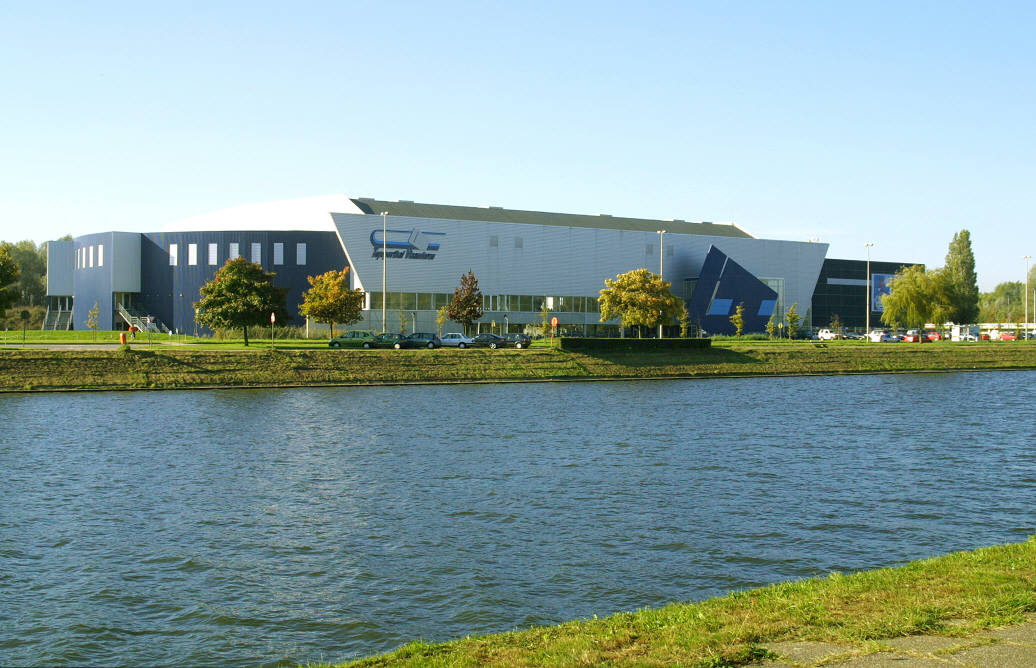
- The host stadium
- Dates: 16 February
- Host city: Ghent
- Venue: Flanders Sports Arena
- Events: 25

The 2020 Belgian Indoor Athletics Championships (Dutch: Belgische kampioenschappen indoor atletiek 2020, French: Championnats de Belgique d'athlétisme en salle 2020) was the year's national championship in indoor track and field for Belgium. It was held on Sunday 16 February at the Flanders Sports Arena in Ghent. A total of 25 events, 13 for men and 12 for women, were contested. It was to serve as preparation for the 2020 World Athletics Indoor Championships, which was postponed due to the COVID-19 outbreak in China before the national championships.

== Results ==
=== Men ===
| Event | Gold | | Silver | | Bronze | |
|---|---|---|---|---|---|---|
| 60 metres | Kobe Vleminckx | 6.71 | Gaylord Kuba Di Vita | 6.73 | Charles Niesen | 6.89 |
| 200 metres | Victor Hofmans | 21.27 | Jordan Pacquot | 21.56 | Simon Mengal | 21.64 |
| 400 metres | Alexander Doom | 47.63 | Dylan Owusu | 48.22 | Asamti Badji | 48.34 |
| 800 metres | Aurèle Vandeputte | 1:49.26 | Aaron Botterman | 1:49.46 | Yoni Van Herck | 1:51.94 |
| 1500 metres | Stijn Baeten | 3:43.46 | Joachim Cardillo | 3:54.65 | Dieter Aerssens | 3:59.39 |
| 3000 metres | Robin Hendrix | 7:51.29 | Oussama Lonneux | 8:07.26 | Wesley De Kerpel | 8:09.84 |
| 5000 m walk | Peter Van Hove | 27:58.05 | Tristan Van Hove | 31:38.61 | Jasper Van Hove | 38:11.09 |
| 60 m hurdles | Michael Obasuyi | 7.69 | Dylan Caty | 7.88 | Nolan Van Cauwemberghe | 8.12 |
| Long jump | Corentin Campener | 7.79 m | Mathias Broothaerts | 7.36 m | Mathew Ugwu | 7.11 m |
| Triple jump | Björn De Decker | 14.86 m | Matthias De Leenheer | 14.37 m | Désiré Kingunza | 14.34 m |
| High jump | Thomas Carmoy | 2.23 m | Bram Ghuys | 2.19 m | Lars Van Looy | 2.10 m |
| Pole vault | Frederik Ausloos | 5.30 m | Arnaud Art | 5.10 m | Jaan Bal | 5.00 m |
| Shot put | Max Vlassak | 17.08 m | Jonathan Guillaume | 15.78 m | Jarno Wagemans | 15.75 m |

=== Women ===
| Event | Gold | | Silver | | Bronze | |
|---|---|---|---|---|---|---|
| 60 metres | Elise Mehuys | 7.31 | Rani Rosius | 7.37 | Rani Vincke | 7.51 |
| 200 metres | Lucie Ferauge | 23.51 | Imke Vervaet | 23.56 | Manon Depuydt | 23.68 |
| 400 metres | Camille Laus | 53.11 | Naomi Van Den Broeck | 54.00 | Orphée Depuydt | 55.61 |
| 800 metres | Camille Muls | 2:08.80 | Mirte Fannes | 2:10.84 | Milly Welsch | 2:14.22 |
| 1500 metres | Elise Vanderelst | 4:12.71 | Lindsey De Grande | 4:28.95 | Zenobie Vangansbeke | 4:32.76 |
| 3000 m walk | Annelies Sarrazin | 16:34.87 | Liesbet De Smet | 17:12.79 | Myriam Nicolas | 17:13.78 |
| 60 m hurdles | Eline Berings | 8.10 | Sarah Missinne | 8.27 | Nafissatou Thiam | 8.34 |
| Long jump | Hanne Maudens | 6.21 m | Imke Vervaet | 6.05 m | Bo Nijs | 5.83 m |
| Triple jump | Elsa Loureiro | 12.98 m | Ilona Masson | 12.24 m | Géraldine Dheur | 11.90 m |
| High jump | Claire Orcel | 1.90 m | Merel Maes | 1.79 m | Yorunn Ligneel | 1.71 m |
| Pole vault | Fanny Smets | 4.40 m NR | Chloé Henry | 4.15 m | Melanie Vissers | 3.85 m |
| Shot put | Elena Defrère | 14.20 m | Hanne Maudens | 13.99 m | Sietske Lenchant | 13.76 m |
