= Bo Brasseur =

Belgian long jumper (born 1998)

Personal information
- National team: Belgium
- Born: 14 May 1998 (age 28) Lubbeek, Flemish Brabant, Belgium
- Education: Western Illinois University

Sport
- Sport: Athletics
- Event: Long jump
- University team: Western Illinois Leathernecks

Bo Brasseur (born 14 May 1998) is a Belgian athlete who specialises in the long jump, twice winning the event at the Belgian National Championships, in 2020 and 2021.

== Early life and education ==
Bo Brasseur was born on 14 May 1998 in Lubbeek. After winning a 200-metre race against her entire class at the age of 5, her teacher recommended to Brasseur's parents that she attend a track and field class. Brasseur officially started competing in athletics from the age of 6. She was educated at the Koninklijk Athneum Tienen school, where she graduated from in 2016 with majors in Modern Languages and Science. Afterwards, she attended the Western Illinois University and was a part of the Western Illinois Leathernecks. While at the university, she set records in both the 4x400 relay and the indoor and outdoor long jump. Brasseur also competed in the Summit League, where she twice won the long jump title, in addition to placing third in the 4x400. In 2020, Brasseur graduated from the university with a 3.9 GPA and a bachelor's degree in Dietetics with minors in French and Forensic Science.

== Career ==
At the 2020 Belgian Athletics Championships, with a jump of 5.98 metres, Brasseur won the long jump title. She won the same title again at the following championship with a jump of 6.04 metres in 2021. The same year she was selected to be a part of the Belgian team at the 2021 European Athletics Team Championships. At the 2022 Belgian Athletics Championships, Brasseur placed third with a mark of 6.11 metres. Brasseur again placed third the following year at the next championship in 2023 with a jump of 6.04 metres.
