= Brian Fay =

Brian Fay may refer to:

- Brian Fay (philosopher)
- Brian Fay (runner)
