= Ouassim Oumaiz =

Spanish long-distance runner

Personal information
- Nationality: Spanish
- Born: 30 March 1999 (age 27) Nerja, Spain

Sport
- Country: Spain
- Sport: Long-distance running
- Event(s): 1500m, 3000m, 5000m
Medal record
Men's athletics
Representing Spain
European Cross Country Championships
Silver medal – second place	2018 Tilburg	Junior race

Ouassim Oumaiz (born 30 March 1999) is a Spanish long-distance runner. He is the Spanish national record holder in the 5km road race with a time of 13:19, which he set in 2020 at the Seven Hills 5K Invitational. He also won the Cross de Atapuerca cross-country race in 2019.

During his successful 2023 season, Oumaiz set a personal best and Andalusian record in the 5,000 m to gain a spot representing Spain at the 2023 World Athletics Championships. However, in March 2024, news broke that Oumaiz had tested positive for a banned substance, GHRP-2, during a routine anti-doping test. He claimed that he was innocent in an interview with Sur. As of May 2024, the investigation into the positive test is ongoing.

== Personal bests ==
Outdoor

- 1500 m: 3:36.83 (Nerja 2021)
- 3000 m: 7:40.62 (Barcelona 2020)
- 5000 m: 13:06.74 (Huelva 2022)
- 5km: 13:19 (Nijmegen 2020) NR
- 10km: 28:35 (Madrid 2020)

Indoor

- 1500 m: 3:47.41 (Ourense 2018)
- 3000 m: 7:44.39 (Madrid 2020)

== Achievements ==
Year	Competition	Venue	Position	Event	Notes
Representing Spain
2016	European Youth Championships	Tbilisi, Georgia	7th	3000 m	8:29.75
2019	World Cross Country Championships	Aarhus, Denmark	20th	9.858 km XC	33:10
2023	World Championships	Budapest, Hungary	16th	5000 m	13:31.99
2023	World Road Running Championships	Riga, Latvia	20th	5 km	13:39
