= Hanne Verbruggen (athlete) =

Belgian long-distance runner

Personal information
- Nationality: Belgian
- Born: 27 May 1993 (age 33) Brussels, Belgium

Sport
- Country: Belgium
- Sport: Athletics
- Event: Long-distance running
- Club: Atletiekclub VITA Ninove
- Coached by: Frans Mattens

Achievements and titles
- Personal bests: 5,000 metres: 15:56.01 (Heusden-Zolder 2019); 10,000 metres: 33:30.67 (London 2019); Half marathon: 1:10:15 (Mainz 2024); Marathon: 2:26:32 (Sevilla 2023)

Hanne Verbruggen (born 27 May 1993) is a Belgian long-distance runner. She represented Belgium at the 2020 and 2024 Summer Olympics in the women's marathon.

== Career ==
Vebruggen won multiple Belgian titles over several distances on the track and on the road. In July 2017 she was the Belgian track champion over 5000 metres, in August of that same year, she won the Belgium championship 10 km road race, and a month later, she won the national title in the half marathon. In May 2018, Verbruggen competed at the 2018 Belgian Athletics Championships and won a silver medal in the 5,000 metres and gold medal in the 10,000 metres. In August 2019, she won for the second time the Belgium championship 10 km road race, and later that month she competed at the 2019 Belgian Athletics Championships and won a silver medal in the 5000 metres. In September 2020, she competed at the 2020 Belgian Athletics Championships in the 10,000 metres and won a gold medal. In March 2023 she won her second national title in the half marathon.

Verbruggen represented Belgium at the 2022 European Athletics Championships in Munich, Germany, finishing 8th in the marathon, and at the 2024 European Athletics Championships in Rome, Italy, finishing 30th in the half marathon. She also participated at the 2023 World Athletics Championships in Budapest, Hungary, finishing 39th in the marathon.

Verbruggen represented Belgium at the 2020 Summer Olympics in the women's marathon and finished in 49th place. 4 years later, she finished 19th in the women's marathon at the 2024 Summer Olympics in Paris, France, the best ever finish in an Olympic marathon for a Belgian women up to that time. She was later moved up to 18th place when the IOC Executive Board approved an Olympic diploma reallocation for Paris 2024 after the final disqualification of Kenyan-born Romanian runner Delvine Relin Meringor, who originally finished seventh.

In April 2025, at the inaugural European Running Championships in Brussels and Leuven in her home country of Belgium, she was at the center of a controversy when in the 10K run in a leading group of four, she started hyperventilating in the final stages, fainted, got up and finished 12th, afterwards claiming that she had felt intimidated by two companions in the leading group of four who accused her of taking a gel and a water bottle along the course outside the official feed zones.

== Personal life ==
Verbruggen is a full-time science teacher in the Middenschool in Halle, Belgium. An amateur throughout her whole athletics career, she would take unpaid leave to prepare for the Olympics, financing her training camps and sporting materials by selling cakes.
