= Mieke Gorissen =

Belgian long-distance runner (born 1982)

Personal information
- Nationality: Belgian
- Born: 29 November 1982 (age 43) Hasselt, Belgium

Sport
- Sport: Athletics
- Event: Long-distance running
- Club: Atletiekclub De Demer
- Coached by: Gilbert Simal - Christophe Roosen

Mieke Gorissen (born 29 November 1982) is a Belgian long-distance runner. She represented Belgium at the 2020 Summer Olympics in the women's marathon.

== Career ==
Gorissen only began running competitively at the age of 35.

In August 2020, Gorissen competed at the 2020 Belgian Athletics Championships in the 10,000 metres and won a bronze medal.

Gorissen represented Belgium at the 2020 Summer Olympics in the women's marathon and finished in 28th place.

She competed in the women's marathon at the 2022 World Athletics Championships held in Eugene, Oregon, United States.

== Personal life ==
Gorissen holds a master's degree and a PhD in physics from Hasselt University and teaches mathematics and physics at a high school in Diepenbeek.
