= Jack O'Leary =

American football and basketball coach, college athletics administrator

Biographical details
- Born: February 12, 1929; Portsmouth, New Hampshire, U.S.
- Died: December 2, 1983 (aged 54)

Playing career

Football
- 1948: Miami (FL)
- 1956: Colorado College
- Positions: Halfback, quarterback

Coaching career (HC unless noted)

Football
- 1954: Portsmouth HS (NH) (assistant)
- 1957–1958: Colorado College (assistant)
- 1959: St. Mary of the Plains (assistant)
- 1960–1962: St. Mary of the Plains
- 1963–1967: Tulane (assistant)

Basketball
- 1954–1955: New Hampshire Tech
- 1957–1959: Colorado College (assistant)

Administrative career (AD unless noted)
- 1954–1955: New Hampshire Tech
- 1971–1974: Colorado State (assistant AD)
- 1974–1976: Colorado State
- 1976–1981: UCF

Head coaching record
- Overall: 8–18 (college football)

John Thomas O'Leary (February 12, 1929 – December 2, 1983) was an American football and basketball coach and college athletics administrator. He served as the head football coach at St. Mary of the Plains College in Dodge City, Kansas from 1960 to 1962, compiling a record of 8–18. O'Leary was also the athletic director at Colorado State University from 1974 to 1976 and the University of Central Florida (UCF) from 1976 to 1981.

Born and raised in Portsmouth, New Hampshire, O'Leary was a multi-sport star Portsmouth High School and captain of the All-New Hampshire football team in 1946. He began his college football career in 1948 at the University of Miami, playing halfback for head coach Andy Gustafson. O'Leary served in the United States Army during the Korean War, later becoming a commissioned officer. He began his coaching career while in the military, first as head football coach and assistant administrator of athletics at Fort Carson in El Paso County, Colorado in 1952 and then as football and track coach at Fort Devens in Massachusetts the following year.

In 1954, O'Leary was an assistant football coach at his alma mater, Portsmouth High School, before moving to New Hampshire Technical Institute—now known as NHTI, Concord's Community College—in Concord, New Hampshire to serve as athletic director and head basketball coach. After transferring from the University of New Hampshire, O'Leary resumed his college football career in 1956 at Colorado College in Colorado Springs, Colorado, playing quarterback for head coach Roy B. Robertson. From 1957 to 1959, O'Leary was an assistant coach at Colorado College in football, basketball, baseball, and ice hockey, before he was named to the coaching staff at St. Mary of the Plains College in August 1959.

O'Leary died of a heart attack, on December 2, 1983, at the age of 54.

== Head coaching record ==
=== College football ===
Year	Team	Overall	Conference	Standing	Bowl/playoffs
St. Mary of the Plains Cavaliers (NAIA independent) (1960–1962)
1960	St. Mary of the Plains	3–5			
1961	St. Mary of the Plains	4–5			
1962	St. Mary of the Plains	1–8			
St. Mary of the Plains:		8–18			
Total:		8–18			
