= Sara Benfares =

German-French runner (born 2001)

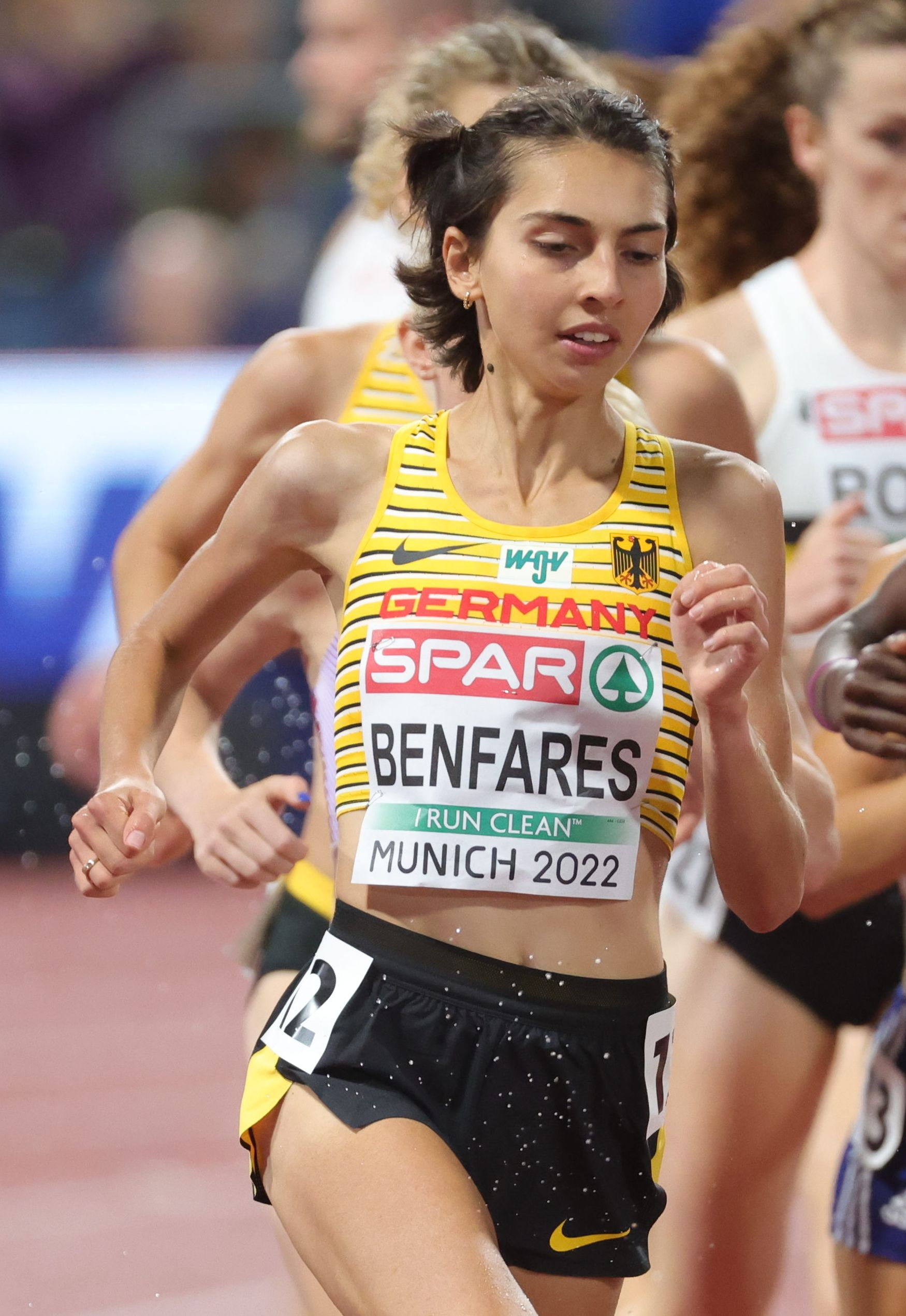
- Benfares in Women's 5000 metres at the European Athletics Championships, Munich 2022

Personal information
- Nationality: Germany; France
- Born: 27 May 2001 (age 25) France

Sport
- Sport: Athletics
- Event(s): Middle-distance and long-distance running, Cross country, 10 km road running
- Club: LC Rehlingen (2019–2024)
- Coached by: Samir Benfares
- Retired: 2024
Medal record
Women's Athletics
German Athletics Championships
Bronze medal – third place	Braunschweig 2021	1500 metres
Gold medal – first place	Sonsbeck 2021	Cross Country (Team)
Silver medal – second place	Saarbrücken 2022	5000 metres
Gold medal – first place	Saarbrücken 2022	10 km Road Running
Gold medal – first place	Saarbrücken 2022	10 km Road Running (Team)

Sara Hildegard Benfares (born 27 May 2001) is a former German-French middle-distance and long-distance runner.

== Career ==
Benfares grew up in Fontainebleau near Paris with her older and younger sister and a younger brother, where the siblings attended a German school. Since 2021, she has been studying Pharmacy at the Saarland University.

In July 2022, Benfares switched her international representation from France to Germany. In August 2022, she finished 11th in the 5000m at the 2022 European Athletics Championships in Munich with a personal best time.

In April 2024, Benfares was issued with a five-year ban for an anti-doping rule violation after testing positive for testosterone, clenbuterol and EPO.

== Personal Bests ==
Outdoor
Discipline	Time	Location	Date
800 metres	2:06.32	Eaubonne	13 February 2021
1500 metres	4:07.30	Monaco	9 July 2021
3000 metres	8:56.36	Ninove	10 August 2022
5000 metres	15:20.94	Munich	18 August 2022
5 km Road	15:50	Lille	20 March 2022
10 km Road	31:46	Houilles	18 December 2022
