= Mateusz Kaczmarek =

Polish footballer

Personal information
- Date of birth: 26 February 2003 (age 23)
- Place of birth: Częstochowa, Poland
- Height: 1.75 m (5 ft 9 in)
- Position: Midfielder

Team information
- Current team: Warta Gorzów Wielkopolski
- Number: 10

Youth career
- –2014: APN Częstochowa
- 2014–2020: Raków Częstochowa

Senior career*
Years	Team	Apps	(Gls)
2020	Raków Częstochowa	1	(0)
2021–2023	Miedź Legnica	10	(0)
2021–2022	Miedź Legnica II	27	(3)
2022–2023	→ Wisła Puławy (loan)	21	(2)
2023–2024	Wisła Puławy	4	(0)
2024	→ Skra Częstochowa (loan)	10	(0)
2024–2025	Skra Częstochowa	8	(0)
2025–	Warta Gorzów Wielkopolski	42	(2)

International career
2018	Poland U15	2	(0)
- * Club domestic league appearances and goals as of 10:55, 5 June 2026 (UTC)

Mateusz Kaczmarek (born 26 February 2003) is a Polish professional footballer who plays as a midfielder for III liga club Warta Gorzów Wielkopolski.

== Career statistics ==
As of match played 23 May 2026

Appearances and goals by club, season and competition
Club	Season	League			Polish Cup		Continental		Other		Total	
Club	Season	Division	Apps	Goals	Apps	Goals	Apps	Goals	Apps	Goals	Apps	Goals
Raków Częstochowa	2019–20	Ekstraklasa	1	0	0	0	—		—		1	0
Miedź Legnica	2020–21	I liga	1	0	0	0	—		—		1	0
Miedź Legnica	2021–22	I liga	2	0	0	0	—		—		2	0
Miedź Legnica	Total		3	0	0	0	—		—		3	0
Miedź Legnica II	2020–21	III liga, gr. III	1	0	—		—		—		1	0
Miedź Legnica II	2021–22	III liga, gr. III	26	3	—		—		—		26	3
Miedź Legnica II	Total		27	3	—		—		—		27	3
Wisła Puławy (loan)	2022–23	II liga	21	2	1	0	—		—		22	2
Wisła Puławy	2023–24	II liga	4	0	1	0	—		—		5	0
Wisła Puławy	Total		25	2	2	0	—		—		27	2
Skra Częstochowa (loan)	2023–24	II liga	10	0	—		—		—		10	0
Skra Częstochowa	2024–25	II liga	8	0	1	0	—		—		9	0
Skra Częstochowa	Total		18	0	1	0	—		—		19	0
Warta Gorzów Wielkopolski	2024–25	III liga, gr. III	13	0	—		—		—		13	0
Warta Gorzów Wielkopolski	2025–26	III liga, gr. III	29	2	—		—		—		29	2
Warta Gorzów Wielkopolski	Total		42	2	—		—		—		42	2
Career total			116	7	3	0	0	0	0	0	119	7

== Honours ==
Raków Częstochowa II

- Polish Cup (Częstochowa regionals): 2019–20

Miedź Legnica

- I liga: 2021–22
