= Laura Nicholson =

Irish athlete (born 2000)

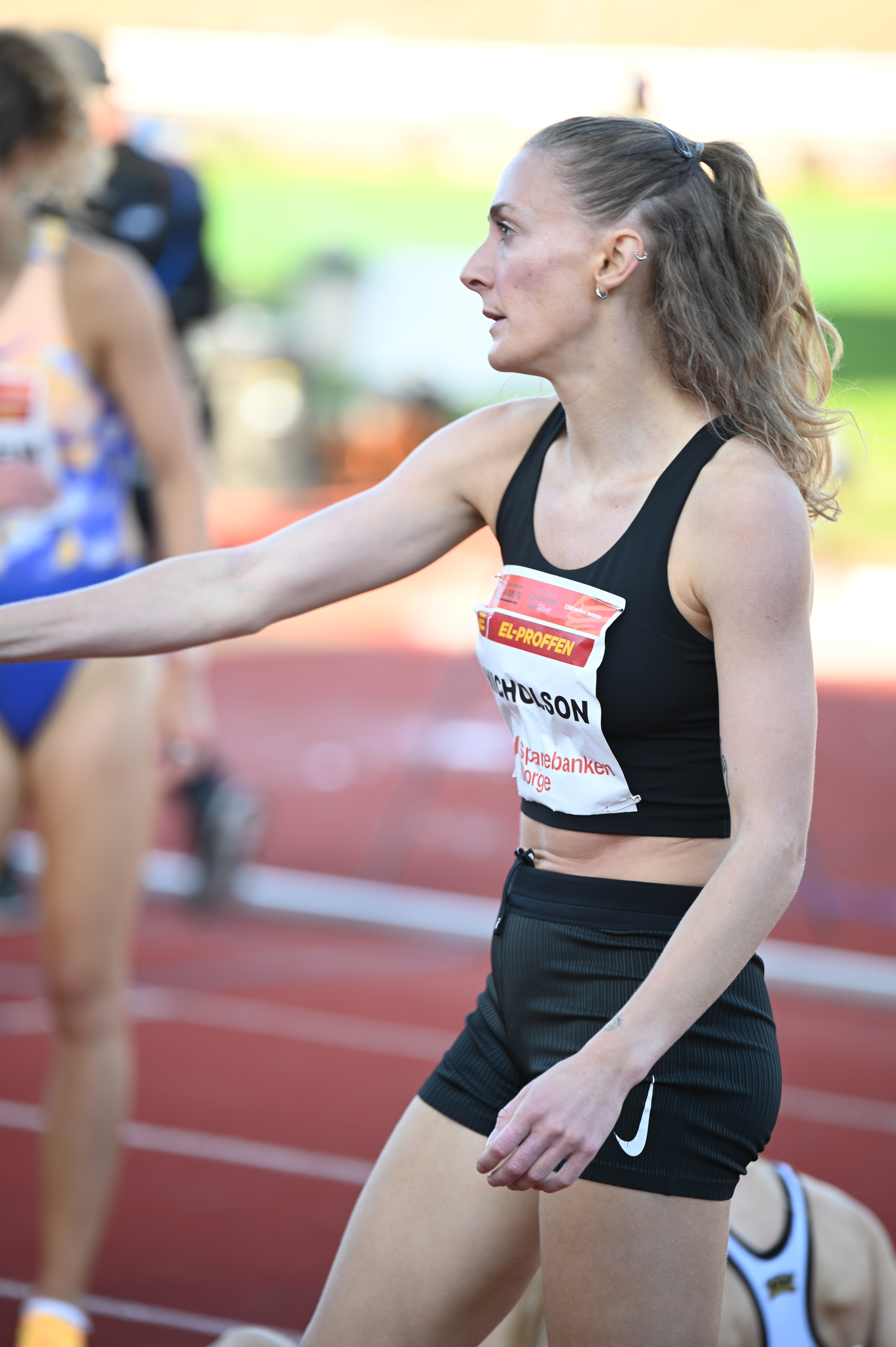
- Laura Nicholson in 2026

Personal information
- Born: 29 March 2000 (age 26)

Sport
- Sport: Athletics
- Events: Middle-distance running, Cross country running

Achievements and titles
- Personal bests: 800m: 2:02.01 (2026); 1500m: 4:07.17 (2025); Mile 4:30.85 (2025); 3000m: 9:13.54 (2024); 5000m: 15:33.04 (2025)

Laura Nicholson (born 29 March 2000) is an Irish middle-distance runner. She won the Irish Athletics Championships in 2025 over 1500 metres and represented Ireland at the 2025 World Athletics Championships.

== Biography ==
Nicholson is from Ballinascarty in County Cork and is a member of Bandon Athletics Club. She was educated in the a United States at the University of Toledo in Ohio. In May 2025, she set a Toledo program record for the 800 metres, running 2:04.80. That year, she was named the Mid-American Conference (MAC) Track Athlete of the Week on several occasions, and was crowned the MAC Most Valuable Performer after winning three titles over the mile run, 800m, and 3000 metres at the MAC indoor Championships.

Nicholson competed for Ireland at the 2025 European Athletics Team Championships Second Division in June 2025, in Maribor, Slovenia, and finished fourth on her Irish senior international debut with a time of 4:20.48 foe the 1500 metres, as the Irish team finished fifth overall. She was selected for the Irish team for the 2025 Summer World University Games in Bochum, Germany, where she qualified for the final of the 1500 metres and placed eighth overall.

Nicholson won the 1500 metres at the Irish Athletics Championships in August 2025 in Dublin, running 4:13.32. In September 2025, she competed over 1500 metres at the 2025 World Championships in Tokyo, Japan, without advancing to the semi-finals. She was selected to compete in the mixed team relay at the 2025 European Cross Country Championships in Portugal, placing sixth overall. Competing at the Perth Track Classic in February 2026, Nicholson was fourth overall in the 1500m, just outside her personal best, in 4:07.52. On 26 July, she placed second over 1500 metres at the Irish championships with 4:08.27.
