= Maria Ahm =

Danish long-distance runner

Personal information
- Born: 23 June 1998 (age 27)

Sport
- Country: Denmark
- Sport: Long-distance running

Maria Ahm (born 23 June 1998) is a Danish long-distance runner. In 2019, she competed in the senior women's race at the 2019 IAAF World Cross Country Championships held in Aarhus, Denmark. She finished in 97th place.
