= Nina Lauwaert =

Belgian long-distance runner

Personal information
- Born: 6 August 1988 (age 37)

Sport
- Country: Belgium
- Event: Long-distance running
Medal record
Women's long-distance running
Belgian Athletics Championships
Gold medal – first place	2018 Brussels	5000 m
Gold medal – first place	2020 Brussels	5000 m
Gold medal – first place	2019 Brussels	10,000 m
Silver medal – second place	2022 Gentbrugge	10,000 m

Nina Lauwaert (born 6 August 1988) is a Belgian long-distance runner.

In 2019, she competed in the women's event at the 2019 European 10,000m Cup held in London, United Kingdom. In 2020, she competed in the women's race at the 2020 World Athletics Half Marathon Championships held in Gdynia, Poland.
