= Yevheniya Prokofyeva =

Ukrainian long-distance runner

Yevheniya Prokofyeva Yevheniia Prokofieva
Personal information
- Born: 5 June 1995 (age 30)

Sport
- Country: Ukraine
- Sport: Long-distance running

Yevheniya Prokofyeva or Yevheniia Prokofieva (Ukrainian: Євгенія Прокоф'єва; born 5 June 1995) is a Ukrainian long-distance runner. In 2020, she competed in the women's half marathon at the 2020 World Athletics Half Marathon Championships held in Gdynia, Poland.

Prokofyeva was issued with a three-year competition ban to serve to June 2027 in relation to an anti-doping rule violation after testing positive for EPO in April 2024.
