= Brian Fay (philosopher) =

American philosopher

Brian C. Fay
- Born: October 5, 1943 (age 83)

Education
- Education: University of Oxford (Ph.D.); Loyola University of Los Angeles (B.A.)

Philosophical work
- Era: 21st-century philosophy
- Region: Western philosophy
- School: Continental
- Institutions: Wesleyan University
- Main interests: political philosophy, philosophy of social sciences
- Website: https://www.wesleyan.edu/academics/faculty/bfay/profile.html

Brian C. Fay (born October 5, 1943) is an American philosopher and William Griffin Professor of Philosophy at Wesleyan University. He is known for his works on the philosophy of social sciences.

== Books ==
- Social Theory and Political Practice (1975)
- Critical Social Science: Liberation and its Limits (1987)
- Contemporary Philosophy of Social Science: A Multicultural Approach (1996)
- Louis Mink: Historical Understanding (ed.) (1987)
- History and Theory: Contemporary Readings (ed.) (1998)
