= Michael Somers =

Belgian long-distance runner

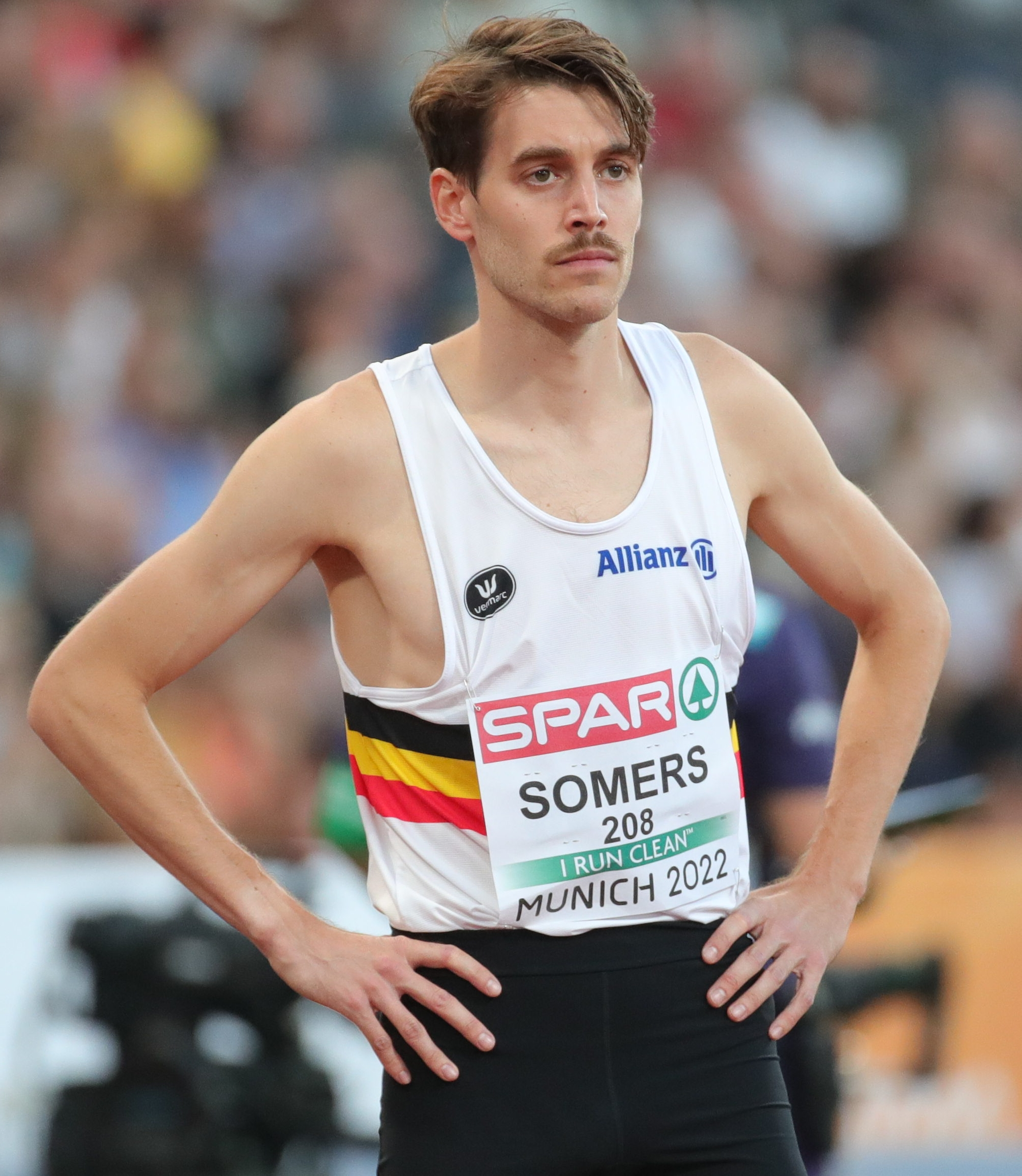
- Somers in 2022

Personal information
- Nationality: Belgian
- Born: 2 March 1995 (age 31)

Sport
- Country: Belgium
- Sport: Track and Field
- Event(s): 1500m, 3000m, 5000m, 10,000m, Marathon
- Club: Atletiekclub Lyra ( - 2022); Royal CABW Nivelles (2022 - )
- Coached by: Rik Didden ( - 2022); Hamish Carson (2022 - )

Achievements and titles
- Personal bests: Outdoor; 1500 m: 3:39.36 (Heusden-Zolder 2021); 3000 m: 8:03.22 (Herentals 2018); 5000 m: 13:29.03 (Heusden-Zolder 2022); 10,000 m: 27:53.50 (Leiden 2022); Indoor; 1500 m: 3:40.61 (Kirchberg 2021); 3000 m: 7:48.72 (Louvain-la-Neuve 2022); Two miles: 8:43.77 (Dortmund 2022)

Michael Somers (born 2 March 1995) is a Belgian long-distance runner. He won the 5000 meters at the 2019 Belgian Athletics Championships. He also won the overall title of the 2021–22 Lotto Cross Cup. In December 2021, he finished 5th at the 2021 European Cross Country Championships in Dublin, Ireland in a race won by Norway's Jakob Ingebrigtsen.

In January 2023 Somers made his debut in the half-marathon, finishing 4th in the half-marathon in Seville In June he represented Belgium at the 2024 European Athletics Championships in Rome, Italy, finishing 25th in the men's half marathon. In September 2023 he qualified for the marathon at the 2024 Summer Olympics in Paris, France by finishing 16th in the Berlin Marathon in a time of 2h08:09, a mere 1 second within the required qualification marker of 2h08:10. At those Olympics he finished 22nd in the marathon. Immediately after finishing, he touched the nation by first asking a Sporza TV reporter to lend him his phone so he could call his dad who was suffering at home from a lingering illness, not getting through and then addressing in tears via live TV his dad to let him know that his name was now "forever in the record books". His dad died 3 days later.

In March 2025, Somers was suddenly forced to retire from the sport for medical reasons after a routine check-up found scar tissue on his heart muscle, which can lead to heart rhythm disorders.

== Competition record ==
Year	Competition	Venue	Position	Event	Time
Representing Belgium
2018	European Cross Country Championships	Tilburg, The Netherlands	22nd	Senior race	29:49
2019	European Cross Country Championships	Lisbon, Portugal	24th	Senior race	31:25
2021	European Cross Country Championships	Dublin, Ireland	5th	Senior race	30:38
2024	European Championships	Rome, Italy	25th	Half marathon	1:03:20 SB
2024	Olympic Games	Paris, France	22nd	Marathon	2:10:32
