= Hanna Vandenbussche =

Belgian long-distance runner

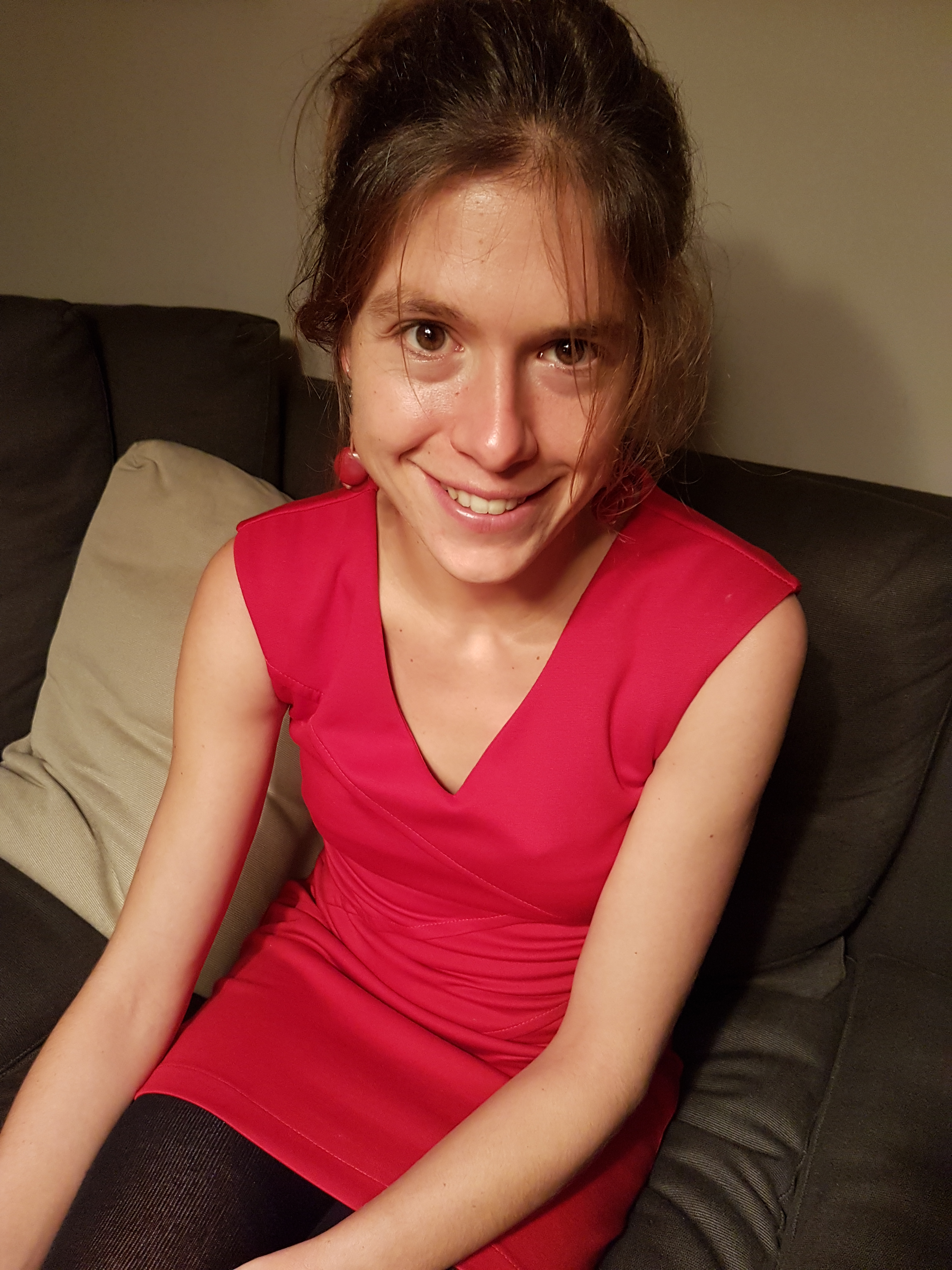

Personal information
- Nationality: Belgian
- Born: 3 July 1987 (age 38)

Sport
- Sport: Athletics
- Event: Marathon

Hanna Vandenbussche (born 3 July 1987) is a Belgian athlete. She competed in the women's marathon event at the 2019 World Athletics Championships.
