= Hanne Maudens =

Belgian heptathlete (born 1997)

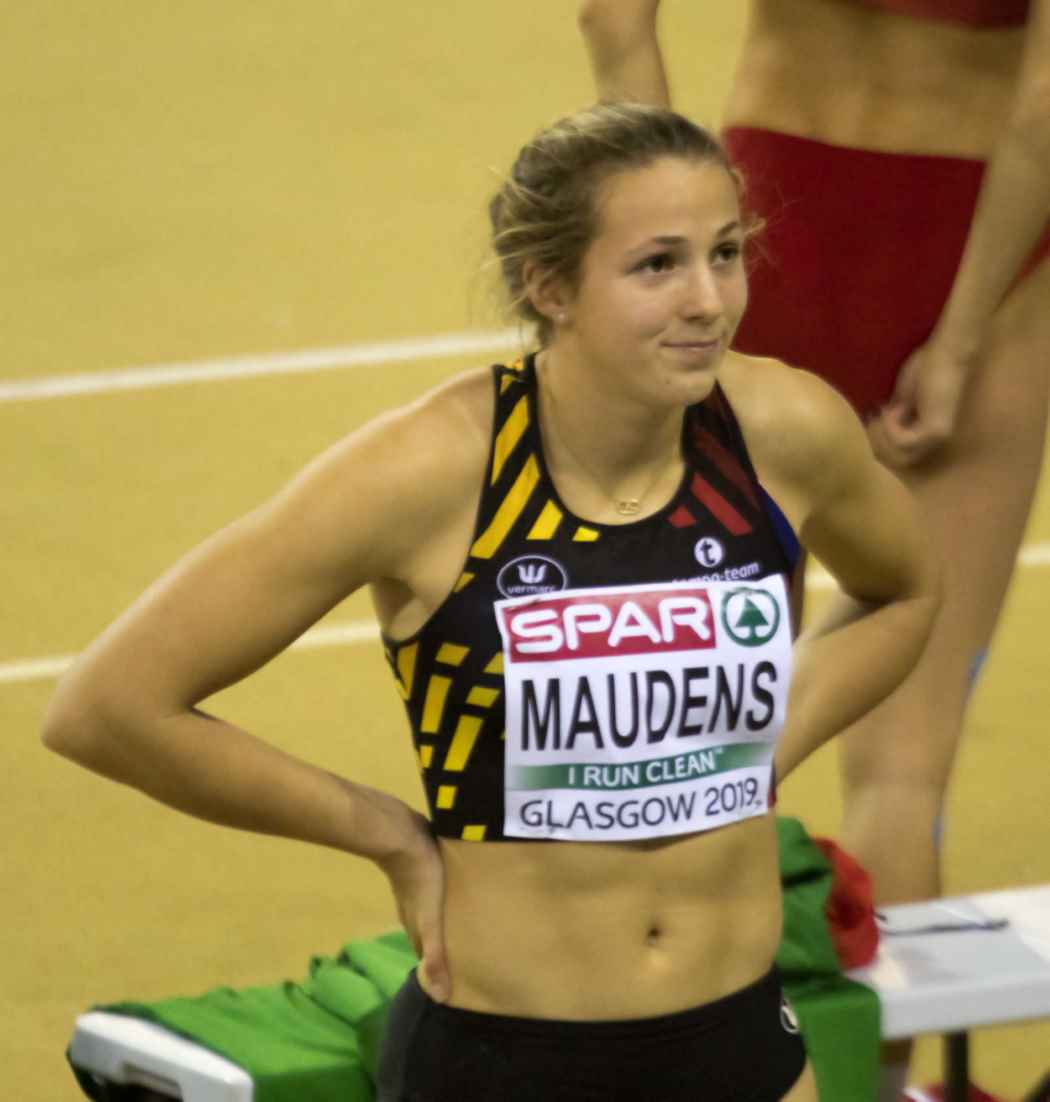
- Hanne Maudens in 2019

Personal information
- Nationality: Belgian
- Born: 12 March 1997 (age 28); Wetteren, Belgium

Sport
- Sport: Athletics
- Event: Heptathlon

Hanne Maudens (born 12 March 1997) is a Belgian heptathlete. She competed in the women's heptathlon at the 2017 World Championships in Athletics. In 2020, she won the gold medal in the women's long jump event at the 2020 Belgian Indoor Athletics Championships held in Ghent, Belgium.
