= Mathias Broothaerts =

Belgian athletics competitor

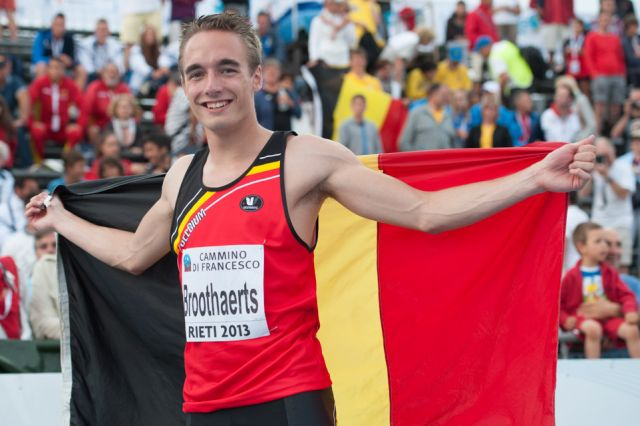
- Broothaerts in 2013

Personal information
- Born: 12 July 1994 (age 32) Wilrijk, Belgium
- Years active: 2010–present
- Height: 1.78 m (5 ft 10 in)
- Weight: 71 kg (157 lb)

Sport
- Country: Belgium
- Sport: Track and field
- Event: Long jump
Medal record
Men's long jump
Representing Belgium
European Junior Championships
Silver medal – second place	2013 Rieti	Long jump

Mathias Broothaerts is a Belgian athletics competitor who competes primarily in the long jump, Broothaerts has also competed professionally in the 100 metres and 4 × 100 metres relay the last time being in 2013.

== Career ==
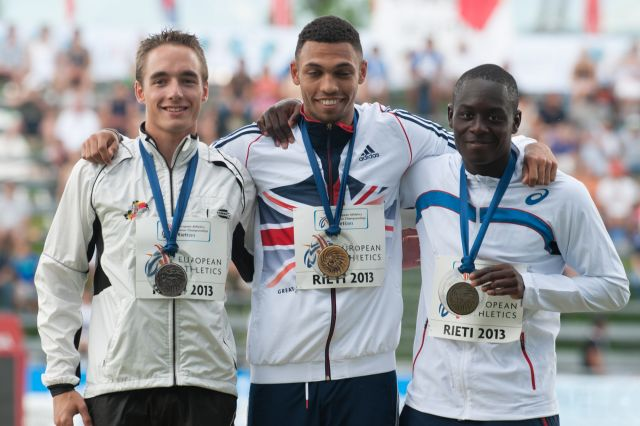
Broothaerts (left) in 2013

Broothaerts began his career in 2010 during the Youth Olympics first in the 100 metre and later in the long jump. He did not qualify for the 100 meter final and finished in 7th in the long jump. In 2012, at the Belgian Athletics Championships, his first time at the event he finished in 2nd in long jump earning himself a silver medal. Broothaerts competed in the Belgian indoor and outdoor championships in 2012 finishing 2nd and 3rd respectively.

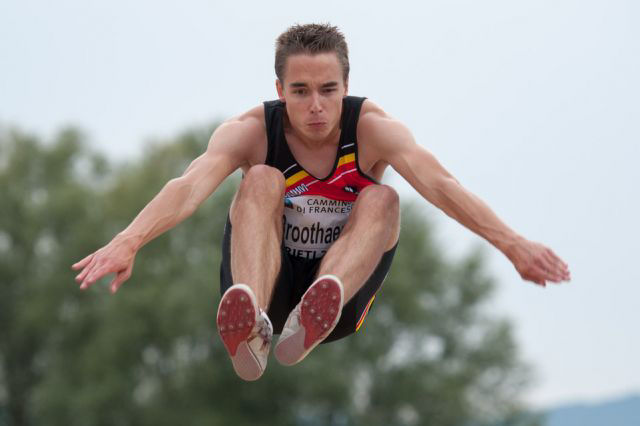
Broothaerts in 2013 at the European Athletics Junior Championships

In 2014 after strong showings at domestic and international competition Broothaerts qualified for the 2014 European Athletics Championships however he finished in 25th and was eliminated from competition. However, after the competition Broothaerts thanked his fans for the support and vowed he would return better.

== Personal bests ==
Outdoor

- Long jump — 8.07 m. in 2014
- 100 metre — 10.85 sec. in 2017.

Indoor

- Long jump — 7.66 m. in 2014
