= Timothy Herman =

Belgian athlete (born 1990)

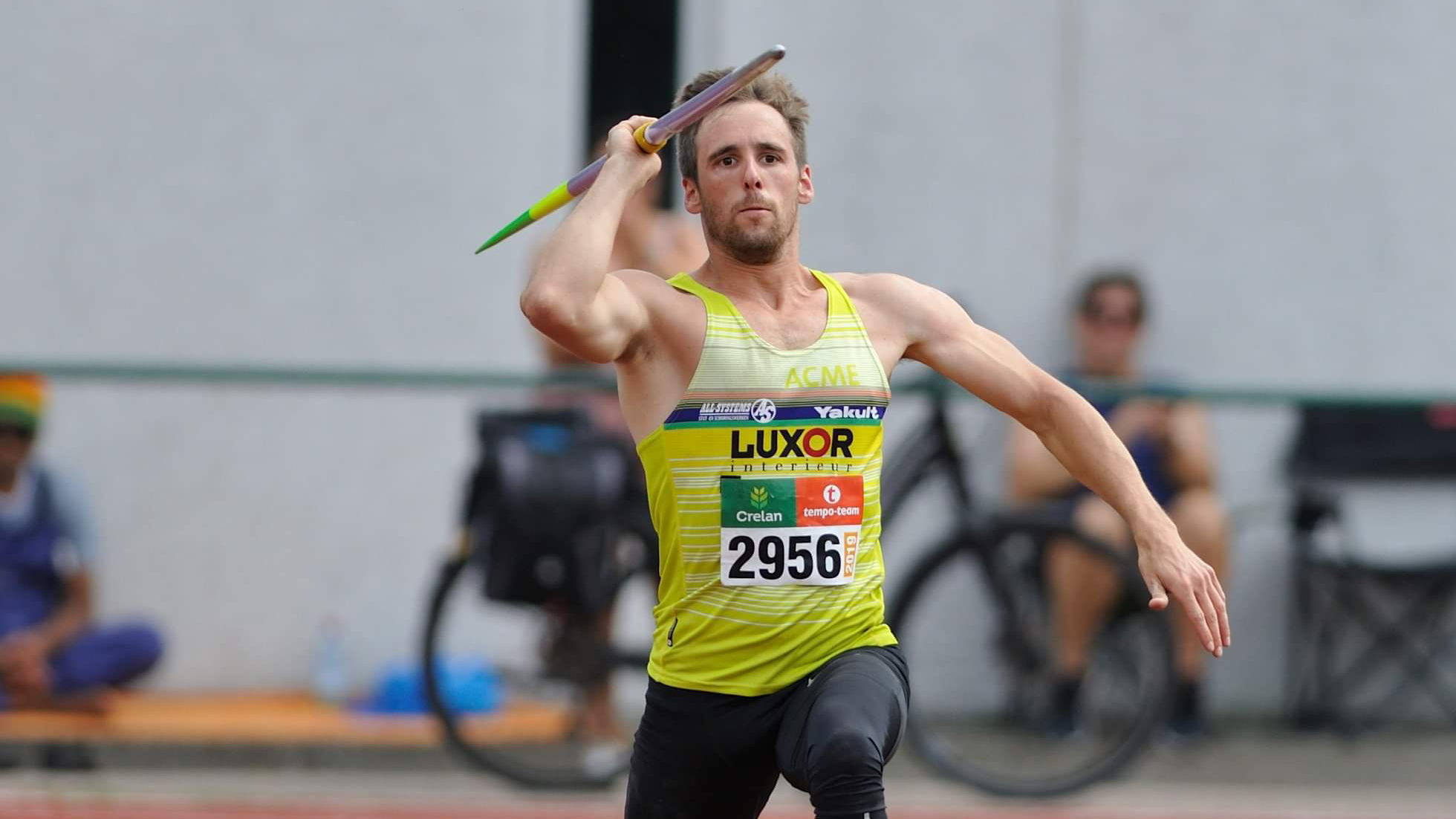
- Herman in 2019

Personal information
- Nationality: Belgian
- Born: 19 October 1990 (age 35) Oudenaarde, Belgium

Sport
- Sport: Athletics
- Event: Javelin

Achievements and titles
- Personal bests: Javelin: 87.35m (Nairobi, 2023) NR

Timothy Herman (born 19 October 1990) is a Belgian track and field athlete. He is a multiple time national champion and national record holder in the javelin.

His grandfather was Olympic runner Frans Herman.

== Biography ==
At a young age he started with athletics, but did not like the running events. He started with a javelin variant called hockey ball (Dutch: hockeybal), a sport aimed to throw a ball of 140 gram as far as possible. It appeared that he was talented and was able to throw 64.90 metres. As a result of that he switched to javelin. While having sponsors, he needed to combine his sport with work. Herman was injured from 2015 to the end of 2016.

From ACME Zomergem, he is coached by Johan Kloeck and Luc van Maldegem. On May 30, 2019, he threw 80.48m at the Flemish championships in Heusden-Zolder. It was his first throw over 80 metres.

In 2022, Herman took part in the 2022 European Athletics Championships in Munich. He qualified for the final, and finished in tenth place overall.

In 2023, at the Kip Keino Classic in Nairobi, he improved the 24-year-old Belgian national record set by Johan Kloeck, throwing 87.35 metres. In June 2023, he finished second in Division One of the javelin throw at the 2023 European Athletics Team Championships in Silesia, Poland, with a distance of 81.67 metres.

He was selected for the 2024 European Athletics Championships in Rome in June 2024 where he threw 77.45 metres to place nineteenth in qualifying and did not progress to the final. He competed in the javelin at the 2024 Summer Olympics in Paris in August 2024, throwing 79.42 metres to finish twentieth in the qualifying, and did not proceed to the final.

In August 2026, he competed at the 2026 European Athletics Championships in Birmingham, England, in the javelin throw. At the 2026 Diamond League Final in Brussels in September, he placed sixth with a throw of 71.79 metres.
