= 2021 European Cross Country Championships =

- Organisers: EAA
- Edition: 27th
- Date: 12 December
- Host city: Dublin, Ireland
- Venue: National Sports Campus
- Events: 7
- Distances: 10.052 km – Men; 8.025 km – Women; 6.011 km – Mixed relay 8.025 km – U23 men 6.011 km – U23 women 6.011 km – U20 men 3.984 km – U20 women
- Participation: 606 athletes from 37 nations

Video on YouTube Men's Senior Race – official video

Video on YouTube Women's Senior Race – official video

The 2021 European Cross Country Championships was the 27th edition of the cross country running competition for European athletes. It was held on 12 December 2021 in Dublin, Ireland. The event was held on a course which included a big loop of 1,517 meters, a smaller loop of 1,007 meters. The start and finish straights reduces the total distance by 57 meters.

== Medal summary ==
Event	Gold		Silver		Bronze	
Senior men (10.052 km)	Jakob Ingebrigtsen (NOR)	30:15	Aras Kaya (TUR)	30:29	Jimmy Gressier (FRA)	30:34
Senior women (8.025 km)	Karoline Bjerkeli Grøvdal (NOR)	26:34	Meraf Bahta (SWE)	26:44	Alina Reh (GER)	26:53
U23 men (8.025 km)	Charles Hicks (GBR)	24:29	Darragh McElhinney (IRL)	24:33	Ruben Querinjean (LUX)	24:36
U23 women (6.011 km)	Nadia Battocletti (ITA)	20:32	Klara Lukan (SLO)	20:36	Mariana Machado (POR)	20:36
U20 men (6.011 km)	Axel Vang Christensen (DEN)	17:53	Abdullahi Dahir Rabi (NOR)	18:18	Joel Ibler Lillesø (DEN)	18:21
U20 women (3.984 km)	Megan Keith (GBR)	13:41	Ingeborg Østgård (NOR)	13:44	Emma Heckel (GER)	13:46
Senior men's team	France (FRA); Jimmy Gressier; Hugo Hay; Yann Schrub; Felix Bour; Duncan Perrillat; Mehdi Frère	13 pts	Spain (ESP); Nassim Hassaous; Carlos Mayo; Abdessamad Oukhelfen; Raúl Celada; Adel Mechaal; Ayad Lamdassem	30 pts	Norway (NOR); Jakob Ingebrigtsen; Bjørnar Sandnes Lillefosse; Narve Gilje Nordås; Zerei Kbrom Mezngi; Tom Erling Kårbø; Filip Ingebrigtsen	47 pts
Senior women's team	Great Britain (GBR); Jessica Judd; Jennifer Nesbitt; Jessica Gibbon; Abbie Donnelly; Kate Avery; Lauren Heyes	25 pts	Germany (GER); Alina Reh; Konstanze Klosterhalfen; Domenika Mayer; Vera Coutellier; Céline Kaiser	29 pts	Sweden (SWE); Meraf Bahta; Samrawit Mengsteab; Sara Christiansson; Charlotte Andersson	38 pts
U23 men's team	Ireland (IRL); Darragh McElhinney; Keelan Kilrehill; Micheal Power; Donal Devane; Jamie Battle; Thomas Devaney	21 pts	Great Britain (GBR); Charles Hicks; Zakariya Mahamed; Thomas Mortimer; Rory Leonard; Matthew Stonier; Samuel Charlton	24 pts	France (FRA); Antoine Senard; Valentin Gondouin; Florian Le Pallec; Baptiste Fourmont; Baptiste Guyon; Bastien Augusto	36 pts
U23 women's team	Italy (ITA); Nadia Battocletti; Anna Arnaudo; Giovanna Selva; Sara Nestola; Ludovica Cavalli; Michela Moretton	18 pts	France (FRA); Manon Trapp; Margaux Sieracki; Aude Clavier; Flavie Renouard; Mélody Julien; Eugénie Lorain	25 pts	Great Britain (GBR); Izzy Fry; Amelia Quirk; Cari Hughes; Eloise Walker; Eleanor Bolton; Jemima Elgood	37 pts
U20 men's team	Great Britain (GBR); Will Barnicoat; Hamish Armitt; Henry McLuckie; Osian Perrin; Liam Rawlings; Lewis Hannigan	34 pts	Ireland (IRL); Abdel Laadjel; Dean Casey; Nick Griggs; Scott Fagan; Sean Kay; Cathal O'Reilly	35 pts	Israel (ISR); Matan Ivri; Adisu Guadia; Derba Ayale; Dego Abebe; Ataka Damsia; Harel Shain	37 pts
U20 women's team	Germany (GER); Emma Heckel; Anneke Vortmeier; Mia Jurenka; Johanna Pulte; Jasmina Nanette Stahl	15 pts	Spain (ESP); Mireya Arnedillo; Ángela Viciosa; María Forero; Marta Serrano; Claudia Gómez; Carla Domínguez	27 pts	Great Britain (GBR); Megan Keith; Ellen Weir; Phoebe Anderson; Beatrice Wood; Alice Garner; Ella Greenway	32 pts
Mixed relay (6.011 km)	Great Britain (GBR); Hannah Nuttall; Luke Duffy; Alexandra Bell; Benjamin West	18:01	France (FRA); Aurore Fleury; Azeddine Habz; Alexa Lemitre; Alexis Miellet	18:05	Belgium (BEL); Elise Vanderelst; Ruben Verheyden; Vanessa Scaunet; Stijn Baeten	18:06

== Results ==
=== Senior Men ===
Individual race
Rank	Athlete	Country	Time (m:s)
1st place, gold medalist(s)	Jakob Ingebrigtsen	Norway	30:15
2nd place, silver medalist(s)	Aras Kaya	Turkey	30:29
3rd place, bronze medalist(s)	Jimmy Gressier	France	30:34
4	Hugo Hay	France	30:38
5	Michael Somers	Belgium	30:38
6	Yann Schrub	France	30:39
7	Nassim Hassaous	Spain	30:42
8	Felix Bour	France	30:44
9	Isaac Kimeli	Belgium	30:45
10	Brian Fay	Ireland	30:45
11	Carlos Mayo	Spain	30:51
12	Abdessamad Oukhelfen	Spain	31:03
13	Hiko Tonosa Haso	Ireland	31:05
14	Filimon Abraham	Germany	31:07
15	Raúl Celada	Spain	31:12
16	Adel Mechaal	Spain	31:12
17	Jonas Raess	Switzerland	31:16
18	Jack Rowe	United Kingdom	31:18
19	Samuel Fitwi Sibhatu	Germany	31:19
20	Mike Foppen	Netherlands	31:20
21	Bjørnar Sandnes Lillefosse	Norway	31:21
22	Rinas Akhmadeyev	Authorised Neutral Athletes	31:24
23	Andrew Butchart	United Kingdom	31:26
24	Jamie Crowe	United Kingdom	31:28
25	Narve Gilje Nordås	Norway	31:30
26	Zerei Kbrom Mezngi	Norway	31:32
27	Stuart McCallum	United Kingdom	31:32
28	Cormac Dalton	Ireland	31:33
29	Andreas Vojta	Austria	31:35
30	Duncan Perrillat	France	31:35
31	Jamal Abdelmaji Eisa Mohammed	ART	31:38
32	Jake Smith	United Kingdom	31:40
33	William Battershill	United Kingdom	31:43
34	Miguel Marques	Portugal	31:44
35	Mehdi Frère	France	31:49
36	Stepan Kiselyov	Authorised Neutral Athletes	32:01
37	Samuel Barata	Portugal	32:01
38	Jacob Sommer Simonsen	Denmark	32:02
39	Johannes Motschmann	Germany	32:02
40	Joey Hadorn	Switzerland	32:03
41	Tom Hendrikse	Netherlands	32:05
42	Ayad Lamdassem	Spain	32:10
43	Rui Teixeira	Portugal	32:13
44	Emmet Jennings	Ireland	32:14
45	Pieter-Jan Hannes	Belgium	32:14
46	Yassin Bouih	Italy	32:15
47	Markus Görger	Germany	32:16
48	Artur Olejarz	Poland	32:17
49	Tachlowini Gabriyesos	ART	32:19
50	Vitaliy Shafar	Ukraine	32:27
51	Urs Schönenberger	Switzerland	32:29
52	Tom Erling Kårbø	Norway	32:31
53	Ersin Tekal	Turkey	32:32
54	Nicolaï Saké	Belgium	32:33
55	Jonathan Dahlke	Germany	32:44
56	Paul O'Donnell	Ireland	32:49
57	Giuseppe Gerratana	Italy	32:54
58	Ryan Forsyth	Ireland	32:58
59	Jáchym Kovář	Czech Republic	33:04
60	Sergiy Polikarpenko	Italy	33:09
61	Fouad Idbafdil	ART	33:11
62	André Pereira	Portugal	33:13
63	Julien Wanders	Switzerland	33:13
64	Leonid Latsepov	Estonia	33:20
65	Otmane Nait Hammou	ART	33:28
66	Ignas Brasevičius	Lithuania	33:33
67	Ilie Alexandru Corneschi	Romania	33:36
68	Uģis Jocis	Latvia	33:38
69	Ahmed Ouhda	Italy	33:51
70	Mikkel Dahl-Jessen	Denmark	33:51
71	Jakob Dybdal Abrahamsen	Denmark	34:00
72	Jānis Višķers	Latvia	34:11
73	Jamal Ismail Gabir Arabi	ART	34:11
74	Lukas Tarasevičius	Lithuania	34:17
75	Harvey Dixon	Gibraltar	34:26
76	Dillon Cassar	Malta	35:03
77	Karel Hussar	Estonia	35:14
78	Arnold Rogers	Gibraltar	38:12
79	Sonny Folcheri	Monaco	38:57
80	Robert Matto	Gibraltar	40:52
81	Steven Walker	Gibraltar	42:37
82	Maurice Turnock	Gibraltar	43:34
—	Yemaneberhan Crippa	Italy	DNF
—	Filip Ingebrigtsen	Norway	DNF
—	Simas Bertašius	Lithuania	DNF

Team race
Rank	Team	Points
1st place, gold medalist(s)	France; Jimmy Gressier; Hugo Hay; Yann Schrub; Felix Bour; Duncan Perrillat; Mehdi Frère	13 pts (3+4+6)
2nd place, silver medalist(s)	Spain; Nassim Hassaous; Carlos Mayo; Abdessamad Oukhelfen; Raúl Celada; Adel Mechaal; Ayad Lamdassem	30 pts (7+11+12)
3rd place, bronze medalist(s)	Norway; Jakob Ingebrigtsen; Bjørnar Sandnes Lillefosse; Narve Gilje Nordås; Zerei Kbrom Mezngi; Tom Erling Kårbø; Filip Ingebrigtsen	47 pts (1+21+25)
4	Ireland; Brian Fay; Hiko Tonosa Haso; Cormac Dalton; Emmet Jennings; Paul O'Donnell; Ryan Forsyth	51 pts (10+13+28)
5	Belgium; Michael Somers; Isaac Kimeli; Pieter-Jan Hannes; Nicolaï Saké	59 pts (5+9+45)
6	United Kingdom; Jack Rowe; Andrew Butchart; Jamie Crowe; Stuart McCallum; Jake Smith; William Battershill	65 pts (18+23+24)
7	Germany; Filimon Abraham; Samuel Fitwi Sibhatu; Johannes Motschmann; Markus Görger; Jonathan Dahlke	72 pts (14+19+39)
8	Switzerland; Jonas Raess; Joey Hadorn; Urs Schönenberger; Julien Wanders	108 pts (17+40+51)
9	Portugal; Miguel Marques; Samuel Barata; Rui Teixeira; André Pereira	114 pts (34+37+43)
10	ART; Jamal Abdelmaji Eisa Mohammed; Tachlowini Gabriyesos; Fouad Idbafdil; Otmane Nait Hammou; Jamal Ismail Gabir Arabi	141 pts (31+49+61)
11	Italy; Yassin Bouih; Giuseppe Gerratana; Sergiy Polikarpenko; Ahmed Ouhda; Yemaneberhan Crippa	163 pts (46+57+60)
12	Denmark; Jacob Sommer Simonsen; Mikkel Dahl-Jessen; Jakob Dybdal Abrahamsen	179 pts (38+70+71)
13	Gibraltar; Harvey Dixon; Arnold Rogers; Robert Matto; Steven Walker; Maurice Turnock	233 pts (75+78+80)
—	Lithuania; Ignas Brasevičius; Lukas Tarasevičius; Simas Bertašius	NM (66+74)

=== Senior Women ===
Individual race
Rank	Athlete	Country	Time (m:s)
1st place, gold medalist(s)	Karoline Bjerkeli Grøvdal	Norway	26:34
2nd place, silver medalist(s)	Meraf Bahta	Sweden	26:44
3rd place, bronze medalist(s)	Alina Reh	Germany	26:53
4	Jess Judd	United Kingdom	27:01
5	Konstanze Klosterhalfen	Germany	27:12
6	Samrawit Mengsteab	Sweden	27:34
7	Selamawit Teferi	Israel	27:34
8	Carmela Cardama	Spain	27:41
9	Fionnuala McCormack	Ireland	27:52
10	Jennifer Nesbitt	United Kingdom	27:58
11	Jessica Gibbon	United Kingdom	28:12
12	Abbie Donnelly	United Kingdom	28:24
13	Dina Aleksandrova	Authorised Neutral Athletes	28:34
14	Yasemin Can	Turkey	28:38
15	Eilish Flanagan	Ireland	28:39
16	Anna Pataki	Hungary	28:40
17	Rebecca Lonedo	Italy	28:40
18	Carolina Robles	Spain	28:44
19	Anna Tropina	Authorised Neutral Athletes	28:46
20	Fatma Karasu	Turkey	28:46
21	Domenika Mayer	Germany	28:47
22	Mekdes Woldu	France	28:48
23	Aoibhe Richardson	Ireland	28:48
24	Ancuța Bobocel	Romania	28:53
25	Méline Rollin	France	28:54
26	Roisin Flanagan	Ireland	28:54
27	Vera Coutellier	Germany	28:55
28	Johanna Peiponen	Finland	28:57
29	Mathilde Sénéchal	France	28:57
30	Sara Christiansson	Sweden	28:59
31	Roxana Elisabeta Rotaru	Romania	29:00
32	Yayla Günen	Turkey	29:04
33	Blanca Fernández	Spain	29:07
34	Laura Luengo	Spain	29:09
35	Jip Vastenburg	Netherlands	29:10
36	Kate Avery	United Kingdom	29:11
37	Anna Emilie Møller	Denmark	29:11
38	Aoife Cooke	Ireland	29:15
39	Julia Mayer	Austria	29:17
40	Federica Zanne	Italy	29:18
41	Valentine Chapelotte	France	29:19
42	Alicja Konieczek	Poland	29:19
43	Lauren Heyes	United Kingdom	29:20
44	Charlotte Andersson	Sweden	29:26
45	Céline Kaiser	Germany	29:28
46	Michelle Finn	Ireland	29:34
47	Nina Chydenius	Finland	29:36
48	Giulia Zanne	Italy	29:38
49	Tereza Hrochová	Czech Republic	29:38
50	Ine Bakken	Norway	29:39
51	Martina Merlo	Italy	29:40
52	Claudia Prisecaru	Romania	29:43
53	Michela Cesarò	Italy	29:47
54	Leila Hadji	France	29:48
55	Helene Svane	Denmark	29:49
56	Lidia Campo	Spain	29:54
57	Mathilde Theisen	Norway	29:54
58	Natalya Leontyeva	Authorised Neutral Athletes	29:55
59	Chiara Scherrer	Switzerland	30:02
60	Esma Aydemir	Turkey	30:18
61	Adela Paulina Baltoi	Romania	30:23
62	Militsa Mircheva	Bulgaria	30:28
63	Carolien Millenaar	Denmark	30:28
64	Gaia Colli	Italy	30:43
65	Liliana Maria Dragomir	Romania	30:45
66	Vaida Žūsinaitė-Nekriošienė	Lithuania	30:47
67	Viktorija Varnagirytė	Lithuania	31:19
68	Anastasia Marinakou	Greece	31:35
69	Aikaterini Asimakopoulou	Greece	31:44
70	Elena Adelina Panaet	Romania	31:51
71	Vytautė Budavičienė	Lithuania	31:59
72	Laura Maasik	Estonia	32:10
73	Lisa Bezzina	Malta	32:46
74	Nataliya Lehonkova	Ukraine	32:59
—	Sophie Duarte	France	DNF

Team race
Rank	Team	Points
1st place, gold medalist(s)	United Kingdom; Jessica Judd; Jennifer Nesbitt; Jessica Gibbon; Abbie Donnelly; Kate Avery; Lauren Heyes	25 pts (4+10+11)
2nd place, silver medalist(s)	Germany; Alina Reh; Konstanze Klosterhalfen; Domenika Mayer; Vera Coutellier; Céline Kaiser	29 pts (3+5+21)
3rd place, bronze medalist(s)	Sweden; Meraf Bahta; Samrawit Mengsteab; Sara Christiansson; Charlotte Andersson	38 pts (2+6+30)
4	Ireland; Fionnuala McCormack; Eilish Flanagan; Aoibhe Richardson; Roisin Flanagan; Aoife Cooke; Michelle Finn	47 pts (9+15+23)
5	Spain; Carmela Cardama; Carolina Robles; Blanca Fernández; Laura Luengo; Lidia Campo	59 pts (8+18+33)
6	Turkey; Yasemin Can; Fatma Karasu; Yayla Günen; Esma Aydemir	66 pts (14+20+32)
7	France; Mekdes Woldu; Méline Rollin; Mathilde Sénéchal; Valentine Chapelotte; Leila Hadji; Sophie Duarte	76 pts (22+25+29)
8	Authorised Neutral Athletes; Dina Aleksandrova; Anna Tropina; Natalya Leontyeva	90 pts (13+19+58)
9	Italy; Rebecca Lonedo; Federica Zanne; Giulia Zanne; Martina Merlo; Michela Cesarò; Gaia Colli	105 pts (17+40+48)
10	Romania; Ancuța Bobocel; Roxana Elisabeta Rotaru; Claudia Prisecaru; Adela Paulina Baltoi; Liliana Maria Dragomir; Elena Adelina Panaet	107 pts (24+31+52)
11	Norway; Karoline Bjerkeli Grøvdal; Ine Bakken; Mathilde Theisen	108 pts (1+50+57)
12	Denmark; Anna Emilie Møller; Helene Svane; Carolien Millenaar	155 pts (37+55+63)
13	Lithuania; Vaida Žūsinaitė-Nekriošienė; Viktorija Varnagirytė; Vytautė Budavičienė	204 pts (66+67+71)

=== Senior mixed relay ===
Rank	Team	Time (m:s)
1st place, gold medalist(s)	United Kingdom; Hannah Nuttall, Luke Duffy, Alexandra Bell, Benjamin West	18:01
2nd place, silver medalist(s)	France; Aurore Fleury, Azeddine Habz, Alexa Lemitre, Alexis Miellet	18:05
3rd place, bronze medalist(s)	Belgium; Elise Vanderelst, Ruben Verheyden, Vanessa Scaunet, Stijn Baeten	18:06
4	Ireland; Ciara Mageean, Luke McCann, Síofra Cléirigh Büttner, Andrew Coscoran	18:06
5	Spain; Esther Guerrero, Abderrahman El Khayami, Marta García, Víctor Ruiz	18:13
6	Hungary; Lili Anna Tóth, Márton Pápai, Kinga Ohn, István Szögi	18:25
7	Switzerland; Lore Hoffmann, Michael Curti, Selina Fehler, Jonas Schöpfer	18:31
8	Italy; Joyce Mattagliano, Ossama Meslek, Micol Majori, Mohad Abdikadar Sheik Ali	18:37
9	Ukraine; Natalіia Krol, Volodymyr Kyts, Anna Mishchenko, Roman Rostikus	18:49
10	Turkey; Şilan Ayyıldız, Ibrahim Erata, Tuğba Toptaş, Abdurrahman Gediklioğlu	18:58
11	Andorra; Aina Cinca Bons, Pol Moya, Xènia Mourelo, Carles Gómez Lozano	20:40

=== U23 Men ===
Individual race
Rank	Athlete	Country	Time (m:s)
1st place, gold medalist(s)	Charles Hicks	United Kingdom	24:29
2nd place, silver medalist(s)	Darragh McElhinney	Ireland	24:33
3rd place, bronze medalist(s)	Ruben Querinjean	Luxembourg	24:36
4	Magnus Tuv Myhre	Norway	24:39
5	Guillaume Grimard	Belgium	24:41
6	Keelan Kilrehill	Ireland	24:42
7	Antoine Senard	France	24:48
8	Aarón Las Heras	Spain	24:49
9	Zakariya Mahamed	United Kingdom	24:52
10	Valentin Gondouin	France	24:55
11	Emil Millán de la Oliva	Sweden	24:57
12	Omar Nuur	Sweden	25:00
13	Micheal Power	Ireland	25:03
14	Tom Mortimer	United Kingdom	25:04
15	Duarte Gomes	Portugal	25:10
16	Rory Leonard	United Kingdom	25:14
17	Omar Ismail	Sweden	25:15
18	Luca Alfieri	Italy	25:17
19	Florian Le Pallec	France	25:19
20	Ömer Amaçtan	Turkey	25:20
21	Baptiste Fourmont	France	25:21
22	Pietro Arese	Italy	25:21
23	Matthew Stonier	United Kingdom	25:23
24	Dereje Chekole	Israel	25:23
25	Samuel Charlton	United Kingdom	25:25
26	Vadym Lonskyi	Ukraine	25:26
27	Eemil Helander	Finland	25:31
28	Baptiste Guyon	France	25:33
29	Francesco Guerra	Italy	25:34
30	Assaf Harari	Israel	25:35
31	Mathias Flak	Norway	25:37
32	Malte Propp	Germany	25:38
33	Marco Vanderpoorten	Belgium	25:38
34	Bastien Augusto	France	25:38
35	Ward Leunckens	Belgium	25:39
36	Julius Hild	Germany	25:42
37	Arnaud Collard	Belgium	25:43
38	Etson Barros	Portugal	25:45
39	Marco Fontana Granotto	Italy	25:45
40	Donal Devane	Ireland	25:46
41	Ramazan Baştuğ	Turkey	25:47
42	Maximilian Pingpank	Germany	25:49
43	Alexandre Figueiredo	Portugal	25:50
44	Jamie Battle	Ireland	25:51
45	Zemenu Muchie	Israel	25:51
46	Marios Anagnostou	Greece	25:54
47	Dimitrios Tsakalos	Greece	25:55
48	Nick Jäger	Germany	25:56
49	Axel Djurberg	Sweden	25:57
50	Giedrius Valinčius	Lithuania	26:00
51	Markus Kirk Kjeldsen	Denmark	26:01
52	Diego Bravo	Spain	26:02
53	Jonathan Carmin	Israel	26:09
54	Adam Maijo	Spain	26:11
55	Stan Schipperen	Netherlands	26:12
56	Rúben Amaral	Portugal	26:15
57	Abdullah Tuğluk	Turkey	26:19
58	Eduardo Menacho	Spain	26:20
59	Florian Bremm	Germany	26:28
60	Miguel Moreira	Portugal	26:29
61	Pasquale Selvarolo	Italy	26:31
62	Alejandro Quijada	Spain	26:38
63	Yehonatan Haim	Israel	26:39
64	Lovro Nedeljković	Croatia	26:41
65	Martin Kováčech	Czech Republic	26:42
66	Nestoras Kolios	Greece	26:43
67	Thomas Devaney	Ireland	26:43
68	Nahuel Carabaña	Andorra	26:48
69	Alejandro Onís	Spain	26:49
70	Peter-Daniel Herman	Romania	26:51
71	David Foller	Czech Republic	27:03
72	Daniel Kryzel	Poland	27:09
73	Juri Kovaljov	Estonia	27:29
—	Isaac Nader	Portugal	DNF
—	Mikołaj Czeronek	Poland	DNF

Team race
Rank	Team	Points
1st place, gold medalist(s)	Ireland; Darragh McElhinney; Keelan Kilrehill; Micheal Power; Donal Devane; Jamie Battle; Thomas Devaney	21 pts (2+6+13)
2nd place, silver medalist(s)	United Kingdom; Charles Hicks; Zakariya Mahamed; Thomas Mortimer; Rory Leonard; Matthew Stonier; Samuel Charlton	24 pts (1+9+14)
3rd place, bronze medalist(s)	France; Antoine Senard; Valentin Gondouin; Florian Le Pallec; Baptiste Fourmont; Baptiste Guyon; Bastien Augusto	36 pts (7+10+19)
4	Sweden; Emil Millán de la Oliva; Omar Nuur; Omar Ismail; Axel Djurberg	40 pts (11+12+17)
5	Italy; Luca Alfieri; Pietro Arese; Francesco Guerra; Marco Fontana Granotto; Pasquale Selvarolo	69 pts (18+22+29)
6	Belgium; Guillaume Grimard; Marco Vanderpoorten; Ward Leunckens; Arnaud Collard	73 pts (5+33+35)
7	Portugal; Duarte Gomes; Etson Barros; Alexandre Figueiredo; Rúben Amaral; Miguel Moreira; Isaac Nader	96 pts (15+38+43)
8	Israel; Dereje Chekole; Assaf Harari; Zemenu Muchie; Jonathan Carmin; Yehonatan Haim	99 pts (24+30+45)
9	Germany; Malte Propp; Julius Hild; Maximilian Pingpank; Nick Jäger; Florian Bremm	110 pts (32+36+42)
10	Spain; Aarón Las Heras; Diego Bravo; Adam Maijo; Eduardo Menacho; Alejandro Quijada; Alejandro Onís	114 pts (8+52+54)
11	Turkey; Ömer Amaçtan; Ramazan Baştuğ; Abdullah Tuğluk	118 pts (20+41+57)
12	Greece; Marios Anagnostou; Dimitrios Tsakalos; Nestoras Kolios	159 pts (46+47+66)

=== U23 Women ===
Individual race
Rank	Athlete	Country	Time (m:s)
1st place, gold medalist(s)	Nadia Battocletti	Italy	20:32
2nd place, silver medalist(s)	Klara Lukan	Slovenia	20:36
3rd place, bronze medalist(s)	Mariana Machado	Portugal	20:36
4	Manon Trapp	France	20:42
5	Sarah Healy	Ireland	20:48
6	Anna Arnaudo	Italy	20:55
7	Cristina Ruiz	Spain	21:07
8	Margaux Sieracki	France	21:10
9	Izzy Fry	United Kingdom	21:15
10	Eva Dieterich	Germany	21:18
11	Giovanna Selva	Italy	21:19
12	Amelia Quirk	United Kingdom	21:27
13	Aude Clavier	France	21:29
14	Nathalie Blomqvist	Finland	21:31
15	Águeda Marqués	Spain	21:31
16	Cari Hughes	United Kingdom	21:33
17	Beata Topka	Poland	21:34
18	Flavie Renouard	France	21:34
19	Eloise Walker	United Kingdom	21:37
20	Mélody Julien	France	21:39
21	Linnéa Sennström	Sweden	21:40
22	Isabel Barreiro	Spain	21:43
23	Elia Saura	Spain	21:45
24	Lia Lemos	Portugal	21:45
25	Ruken Tek	Turkey	21:47
26	Eleanor Bolton	United Kingdom	21:48
27	Bohdana Semyonova	Ukraine	21:51
28	Jemima Elgood	United Kingdom	21:52
29	Aleksandra Płocińska	Poland	21:53
30	Andrea Romero	Spain	22:00
31	Danielle Donegan	Ireland	22:03
32	Aoife O'Cuill	Ireland	22:06
33	Sara Nestola	Italy	22:09
34	Elena Dušková	Slovakia	22:10
35	Emilia Lillemo	Sweden	22:11
36	Ludovica Cavalli	Italy	22:11
37	Carla Gallardo	Spain	22:12
38	Julia Afelt	Poland	22:16
39	Eugénie Lorain	France	22:20
40	Derya Kunur	Turkey	22:20
41	Devora Avramova	Bulgaria	22:22
42	Greta Karinauskaitė	Lithuania	22:24
43	Diane van Es	Netherlands	22:25
44	Kim Bödi	Germany	22:28
45	Selma Benfares	Germany	22:32
46	Lauren Tinkler	Ireland	22:34
47	Dafni-Eftychia-Tereza Lavasa	Greece	22:34
48	Michela Moretton	Italy	22:41
49	Jodie McCann	Ireland	22:48
50	Ruth Heery	Ireland	22:51
51	Yonca Kutluk	Turkey	22:51
52	Lisa Oed	Germany	23:01
53	Laura Astrup	Denmark	23:32
54	Anna Málková	Czech Republic	23:34
55	Sonja Vernikov	Germany	23:45
56	Ismini Panagiotopoulou	Greece	24:12
57	Nikoleta Kynatidou	Greece	24:35
—	Liliya Mendayeva	Authorised Neutral Athletes	DNF
—	Dominyka Petraškaitė	Lithuania	DNF

Team race
Rank	Team	Points
1st place, gold medalist(s)	Italy; Nadia Battocletti; Anna Arnaudo; Giovanna Selva; Sara Nestola; Ludovica Cavalli; Michela Moretton	18 pts (1+6+11)
2nd place, silver medalist(s)	France; Manon Trapp; Margaux Sieracki; Aude Clavier; Flavie Renouard; Mélody Julien; Eugénie Lorain	25 pts (4+8+13)
3rd place, bronze medalist(s)	United Kingdom; Izzy Fry; Amelia Quirk; Cari Hughes; Eloise Walker; Eleanor Bolton; Jemima Elgood	37 pts (9+12+16)
4	Spain; Cristina Ruiz; Águeda Marqués; Isabel Barreiro; Elia Saura; Andrea Romero; Carla Gallardo	44 pts (7+15+22)
5	Ireland; Sarah Healy; Danielle Donegan; Aoife O'Cuill; Lauren Tinkler; Jodie McCann; Ruth Heery	68 pts (5+31+32)
6	Poland; Beata Topka; Aleksandra Płocińska; Julia Afelt	84 pts (17+29+38)
7	Germany; Eva Dieterich; Kim Bödi; Selma Benfares; Lisa Oed; Sonja Vernikov	99 pts (10+44+45)
8	Turkey; Ruken Tek; Derya Kunur; Yonca Kutluk	116 pts (25+40+51)
9	Greece; Dafni-Eftychia-Tereza Lavasa; Ismini Panagiotopoulou; Nikoleta Kynatidou	160 pts (47+56+57)

=== U20 Men ===
Individual race
Rank	Athlete	Country	Time (m:s)
1st place, gold medalist(s)	Axel Vang Christensen	Denmark	17:53
2nd place, silver medalist(s)	Abdullahi Dahir Rabi	Norway	18:18
3rd place, bronze medalist(s)	Joel Ibler Lillesø	Denmark	18:21
4	Pol Oriach	Spain	18:24
5	Andrii Atamaniuk	Ukraine	18:30
6	Abdel Laadjel	Ireland	18:30
7	Matan Ivri	Israel	18:30
8	Edouard Morin-Luzuy	France	18:31
9	Will Barnicoat	United Kingdom	18:31
10	Hamish Armitt	United Kingdom	18:32
11	Adisu Guadia	Israel	18:34
12	Sebastian Frey	Austria	18:37
13	Dean Casey	Ireland	18:38
14	Vebjørn Hovdejord	Norway	18:40
15	Henry McLuckie	United Kingdom	18:42
16	Nicholas Griggs	Ireland	18:42
17	Jules Robin	France	18:44
18	Noah Konteh	Belgium	18:46
19	Derebe Ayele	Israel	18:47
20	Benjamin Dern	Germany	18:48
21	Scott Fagan	Ireland	18:49
22	Osian Perrin	United Kingdom	18:49
23	Luc Le Baron	France	18:51
24	Kevin Kamenschak	Austria	18:52
25	Liam Rawlings	United Kingdom	18:53
26	Philip Massacand	Norway	18:56
27	Marc Fernández	Spain	18:58
28	Pedro Amaro	Portugal	18:58
29	Eric Loré	Spain	18:58
30	Théo Seingier	France	18:59
31	Dego Ababa	Israel	18:59
32	João Amaro	Portugal	19:01
33	Fikadu Gonzalez	Spain	19:04
34	Bastian Mrochen	Germany	19:05
35	Emil Bezecny	Austria	19:09
36	Esten Hansen-Møllerud Hauen	Norway	19:09
37	Kirill Mitrofanov	Authorised Neutral Athletes	19:11
38	Mateusz Gos	Poland	19:11
39	Eliot Bidet	France	19:12
40	Romuald Brosset	Switzerland	19:13
41	Sharmarke Ahmed	Sweden	19:13
42	Elia Mattio	Italy	19:14
43	Devrim Kazan	Turkey	19:14
44	Manuel Jiménez	Spain	19:15
45	Ateka Demisie	Israel	19:19
46	Filip Rak	Poland	19:19
47	Vid Botolin	Slovenia	19:20
48	Mathis Lievens	Belgium	19:20
49	David Šlapák	Czech Republic	19:21
50	Sean Kay	Ireland	19:22
51	Hugo Macquet	France	19:25
52	Jesse Fokkenrood	Netherlands	19:27
53	Hamza Hariri	Germany	19:28
54	Mads Meijer	Netherlands	19:28
55	Maxim Wyss	Switzerland	19:31
56	Muhammet Can Çatal	Turkey	19:32
57	Massimiliano Berti	Italy	19:32
58	Hakan Buǧanli	Turkey	19:32
59	Michal Staník	Slovakia	19:33
60	Malthe Juel Bøgebjerg	Denmark	19:33
61	Azat Demirtaş	Turkey	19:35
62	Kurt Lauer	Germany	19:36
63	Duarte Santos	Portugal	19:38
64	Konjoneh Maggi	Italy	19:38
65	Lewis Hannigan	United Kingdom	19:38
66	Noah Baltus	Netherlands	19:40
67	David Cantero	Spain	19:40
68	Jegors Ivanovs	Latvia	19:43
69	Raphael Siebenhofer	Austria	19:45
70	Nicolò Cornali	Italy	19:49
71	Petros Papaioannou	Greece	19:50
72	Julian Gering	Germany	19:52
73	Jacinto Gaspar	Portugal	19:52
74	Panagiotis-Orfeas Giannatis	Greece	19:54
75	Harel Shain	Israel	19:56
76	Elias Ariel Aarestrup Shifris	Denmark	20:00
77	Cathal O'Reilly	Ireland	20:01
78	Thomas Serafini	Italy	20:02
79	Wout Louagie	Belgium	20:06
80	Nicolò Gallo	Italy	20:09
81	Nino Jambrešić	Croatia	20:11
82	Mathias Vanem Aas	Norway	20:11
83	Artūrs Lapiņš	Latvia	20:12
84	Navid Kerber	Switzerland	20:22
85	Nikita Bogdanovs	Latvia	20:25
86	Martin Glerup	Denmark	20:25
87	Gabriel Farrugia	Malta	20:30
88	David Borg	Malta	20:31
89	Lauris Grīniņš	Latvia	20:32
90	Kobe van Rie	Belgium	20:41
91	Jürgen Joonas	Estonia	20:44
92	Gaspar Klückers	Luxembourg	20:44
93	Jakub Davidík	Czech Republic	20:51
94	Ignas Vanagas	Lithuania	20:55
95	Gustav Mørch	Denmark	21:53
96	Maurice Gierens	Luxembourg	22:34
97	Lovro Kasunić	Croatia	22:45

Team race
Rank	Team	Points
1st place, gold medalist(s)	United Kingdom; Will Barnicoat; Hamish Armitt; Henry McLuckie; Osian Perrin; Liam Rawlings; Lewis Hannigan	34 pts (9+10+15)
2nd place, silver medalist(s)	Ireland; Abdel Laadjel; Dean Casey; Nick Griggs; Scott Fagan; Sean Kay; Cathal O'Reilly	35 pts (6+13+16)
3rd place, bronze medalist(s)	| Israel; Matan Ivri; Adisu Guadia; Derba Ayele; Dego Ababa; Ataka Damsia; Harel Shain	37 pts (7+11+19)
4	Norway; Abdullahi Dahir Rabi; Vebjørn Hovdejord; Philip Massacand; Esten Hansen-Møllerud Hauen; Mathias Vanem Aas	42 pts (2+14+26)
5	France; Edouard Morin-Luzuy; Jules Robin; Luc Le Baron; Théo Seingier; Eliot Bidet; Hugo Macquet	48 pts (8+17+23)
6	Spain; Pol Oriach; Marc Fernández; Eric Loré; Fikadu Gonzalez; Manuel Jiménez; David Cantero	60 pts (4+27+29)
7	Denmark; Axel Vang Christensen; Joel Ibler Lillesø; Malthe Juel Bøgebjerg; Elias Ariel Aarestrup Shifris; Martin Glerup; Gustav Mørch	64 pts (1+3+60)
8	Austria; Sebastian Frey; Kevin Kamenschak; Emil Bezecny; Raphael Siebenhofer	71 pts (12+24+35)
9	Germany; Benjamin Dern; Bastian Mrochen; Hamza Hariri; Kurt Lauer; Julian Gering	107 pts (20+34+53)
10	Portugal; Pedro Amaro; João Amaro; Duarte Santos; Jacinto Gaspar	123 pts (28+32+63)
11	Belgium; Noah Konteh; Mathis Lievens; Wout Louagie; Kobe van Rie	145 pts (18+48+79)
12	Turkey; Devrim Kazan; Muhammet Can Çatal; Hakan Buǧanli; Azat Demirtaş	157 pts (43+56+58)
13	Italy; Elia Mattio; Massimiliano Berti; Konjoneh Maggi; Nicolò Cornali; Thomas Serafini; Nicolò Gallo	163 pts (42+57+64)
14	Netherlands; Jesse Fokkenrood; Mads Meijer; Noah Baltus	172 pts (52+54+66)
15	Switzerland; Romuald Brosset; Maxim Wyss; Navid Kerber	179 pts (40+55+84)
16	Latvia; Jegors Ivanovs; Artūrs Lapiņš; Nikita Bogdanovs; Lauris Grīniņš	236 pts (68+83+85)

=== U20 Women ===
Individual race
Rank	Athlete	Country	Time (m:s)
1st place, gold medalist(s)	Megan Keith	United Kingdom	13:41
2nd place, silver medalist(s)	Ingeborg Østgård	Norway	13:44
3rd place, bronze medalist(s)	Emma Heckel	Germany	13:46
4	Ilona Mononen	Finland	13:49
5	Anneke Vortmeier	Germany	13:49
6	Mireya Arnedillo	Spain	13:51
7	Mia Jurenka	Germany	13:52
8	Angela Viciosa	Spain	13:52
9	Johanna Pulte	Germany	13:52
10	Livia Wespe	Switzerland	13:56
11	Emmy van den Berg	Netherlands	13:58
12	Laure Bertrand	France	14:02
13	María Forero	Spain	14:02
14	Ellen Weir	United Kingdom	14:02
15	Sofia Thøgersen	Denmark	14:02
16	Ilaria Bruno	Italy	14:02
17	Phoebe Anderson	United Kingdom	14:03
18	Camille Place	France	14:03
19	Marta Serrano	Spain	14:03
20	Mădălina-Elena Sîrbu	Romania	14:04
21	Amina Maatoug	Netherlands	14:04
22	Anne Knijnenburg	Netherlands	14:06
23	Aoife McGreevy	Ireland	14:07
24	Emma McEvoy	Ireland	14:07
25	Giulia Marangon	Italy	14:08
26	Margot Dajoux	France	14:11
27	Jade Le Corre	France	14:13
28	Gréta Varga	Hungary	14:13
29	Anna Marie Nordengen Sirevåg	Norway	14:14
30	Jane Buckley	Ireland	14:15
31	Ina Halle Haugen	Norway	14:16
32	Julia Koralewska	Poland	14:17
33	Aurora Bado	Italy	14:19
34	Mari Ruud	Norway	14:20
35	Zuzana Porubčanová	Czech Republic	14:20
36	Annelies Nijssen	Belgium	14:21
37	Claudia Gómez	Spain	14:22
38	Rebecca Rossiter	Ireland	14:22
39	Julia Svennblad	Sweden	14:23
40	Maria Kassou	Greece	14:23
41	Astrid My Rønde Kristensen	Denmark	14:23
42	Valentina Rosamilia	Switzerland	14:24
43	Nora Lundin	Sweden	14:25
44	Beatrice Wood	United Kingdom	14:26
45	Julia Ścisłowska	Poland	14:27
46	Rita Figueiredo	Portugal	14:28
47	Oliwia Wawrzyniak	Poland	14:28
48	Eleni Ioannidou	Greece	14:29
49	Lilly Nägeli	Switzerland	14:29
50	Rita Máramarosi	Hungary	14:29
51	Alice Garner	United Kingdom	14:32
52	Filippa Hägglund	Sweden	14:32
53	Liza Šajn	Slovenia	14:33
54	Carla Domínguez	Spain	14:35
55	Laura Mooney	Ireland	14:36
56	Emma Kiplagat Kondrup	Denmark	14:37
57	Romane Wolhauser	Switzerland	14:37
58	Coralie Driss	France	14:37
59	Lisa De Bruyn	Switzerland	14:39
60	Beatriz Fernandes	Portugal	14:39
61	Maria Mihaela Blaga	Romania	14:39
62	Emma Casati	Italy	14:40
63	Jasmina Nanette Stahl	Germany	14:40
64	Yasmine Abbes	Netherlands	14:41
65	Paulina Hultberg	Sweden	14:41
66	Maëlle Porcher	France	14:42
67	Zuzana Michaličková	Slovakia	14:46
68	Ulyana Andreyeva	Authorised Neutral Athletes	14:47
69	Ella Greenway	United Kingdom	14:47
70	Elena Eichenberger	Switzerland	14:48
71	Kamilla Vanadziņa	Latvia	14:48
72	Zita Urbán	Hungary	14:49
73	Uliana Rachynska	Ukraine	14:49
74	Loti Rotar	Slovenia	14:51
75	Olimpia Breza	Poland	14:53
76	Líza Hazuchová	Slovakia	14:54
77	Roise Roberts	Ireland	14:54
78	Maria-Talida Sfarghiu	Romania	14:54
79	Camila Gomes	Portugal	14:54
80	Iulia Florina Marginean	Romania	14:56
81	Arianna Reniero	Italy	15:00
82	Hatice Yıldırım	Turkey	15:00
83	Emilie Langschwager	Denmark	15:02
84	Panna Merényi	Hungary	15:03
85	Gabriella K. Szabó	Hungary	15:08
86	Marie-Louise Jørgensen	Denmark	15:12
87	Vasileia Spyrou	Greece	15:16
88	Natalia Bielak	Poland	15:20
89	Shahar Etgar	Israel	15:25
90	Ana Silva	Portugal	15:26
91	Simona Jambrošić	Croatia	15:29
92	Lorena Bartaković	Croatia	15:38
93	Veronika Sadek	Slovenia	15:41
94	Chiara Pizzolato	Italy	15:47
95	Lea Haler	Slovenia	15:55
96	Mathilde Meedom Larsen	Denmark	16:06
97	Anna Minullina	Authorised Neutral Athletes	16:18
98	Hana Grobovšek	Slovenia	16:20
99	Nazire Güleç	Turkey	16:20

Team race
Rank	Team	Points
1st place, gold medalist(s)	Germany; Emma Heckel; Anneke Vortmeier; Mia Jurenka; Johanna Pulte; Jasmina Nanette Stahl	15 pts (3+5+7)
2nd place, silver medalist(s)	Spain; Mireya Arnedillo; Ángela Viciosa; María Forero; Marta Serrano; Claudia Gómez; Carla Domínguez	27 pts (6+8+13)
3rd place, bronze medalist(s)	United Kingdom; Megan Keith; Ellen Weir; Phoebe Anderson; Beatrice Wood; Alice Garner; Ella Greenway	32 pts (1+14+17)
4	Netherlands; Emmy van den Berg; Amina Maatoug; Anne Knijnenburg; Yasmine Abbes	54 pts (11+21+22)
5	France; Laure Bertrand; Camille Place; Margot Dajoux; Jade Le Corre; Coralie Driss; Maëlle Porcher	56 pts (12+18+26)
6	Norway; Ingeborg Østgård; Anna Marie Nordengen Sirevåg; Ina Halle Haugen; Mari Ruud	62 pts (2+29+31)
7	Italy; Ilaria Bruno; Giulia Marangon; Aurora Bado; Emma Casati; Arianna Reniero; Chiara Pizzolato	74 pts (16+25+33)
8	Ireland; Aoife McGreevy; Emma McEvoy; Jane Buckley; Rebecca Rossiter; Laura Mooney; Roise Roberts	77 pts (23+24+30)
9	Switzerland; Livia Wespe; Valentina Rosamilia; Lilly Nägeli; Romane Wolhauser; Lisa De Bruyn; Elena Eichenberger	101 pts (10+42+49)
10	Denmark; Sofia Thøgersen; Astrid My Rønde Kristensen; Emma Kiplagat Kondrup; Emilie Langschwager; Marie-Louise Jørgensen; Mathilde Meedom Larsen	112 pts (15+41+56)
11	Poland; Julia Koralewska; Julia Ścisłowska; Oliwia Wawrzyniak; Olimpia Breza; Natalia Bielak	124 pts (32+45+47)
12	Sweden; Julia Svennblad; Nora Lundin; Filippa Hägglund; Paulina Hultberg	134 pts (39+43+52)
13	Hungary; Gréta Varga; Rita Máramarosi; Zita Urbán; Panna Merényi; Gabriella K. Szabó	150 pts (28+50+72)
14	Romania; Mădălina-Elena Sîrbu; Maria Mihaela Blaga; Maria-Talida Sfarghiu; Iulia Florina Marginean	159 pts (20+61+78)
15	Greece; Maria Kassou; Eleni Ioannidou; Vasileia Spyrou	175 pts (40+48+87)
16	Portugal; Rita Figueiredo; Beatriz Fernandes; Camila Gomes; Ana Silva	185 pts (46+60+79)
17	Slovenia; Liza Šajn; Loti Rotar; Veronika Sadek; Lea Haler; Hana Grobovšek	220 pts (53+74+93)

== Medal table ==
Rank	Nation	Gold	Silver	Bronze	Total
1	Great Britain (GBR)	5	1	2	8
2	Norway (NOR)	2	2	1	5
3	Italy (ITA)	2	0	0	2
4	France (FRA)	1	2	2	5
5	Ireland (IRL)	1	2	0	3
6	Germany (GER)	1	1	2	4
7	Denmark (DEN)	1	0	1	2
8	Spain (ESP)	0	2	0	2
9	Sweden (SWE)	0	1	1	2
10	Slovenia (SLO)	0	1	0	1
10	Turkey (TUR)	0	1	0	1
12	Belgium (BEL)	0	0	1	1
12	Israel (ISR)	0	0	1	1
12	Luxembourg (LUX)	0	0	1	1
12	Portugal (POR)	0	0	1	1
Totals (15 entries)		13	13	13	39
