= Miguel Márquez =

Miguel Márquez may refer to:

- Miguel Márquez (sculptor) (1911–1990), Spanish sculptor and footballer
- Miguel Márquez (poet) (born 1955), Venezuelan poet
- Miguel Marquez (journalist) (born 1967), U.S. journalist, correspondent for CNN
- Miguel Márquez Márquez (born 1968), Mexican politician, governor of Guanajuato (2012–2018)

== See also ==
- Miguel Marques (disambiguation)
