= 2023 European Athletics Indoor Championships – Men's 3000 metres =

Men's 3000 metres at the 2023 European Athletics Indoor Championships
- Venue: Ataköy Athletics Arena
- Location: Istanbul, Turkey
- Dates: 4 March 2023 (round 1); 5 March 2023 (final)
- Competitors: 20 from 14 nations
- Winning time: 7:40.32 NR

Medalists
gold medal	Jakob Ingebrigtsen	Norway
silver medal	Adel Mechaal	Spain
bronze medal	Elzan Bibić	Serbia

The men's 3000 metres event at the 2023 European Athletics Indoor Championships was held on 4 March at 10:00 (heats) and on 5 March at 20:00 (final) local time.

== Records ==
Standing records prior to the 2023 European Athletics Indoor Championships
World record	Lamecha Girma (ETH)	7:23.81	Liévin, France	15 February 2023
European record	Mohamed Katir (ESP)	7:24.68	Liévin, France	15 February 2023
Championship record	Ali Kaya (TUR)	7:38.42	Prague, Czech Republic	7 March 2015
World Leading	Lamecha Girma (ETH)	7:23.81	Liévin, France	15 February 2023
European Leading	Mohamed Katir (ESP)	7:24.68	Liévin, France	15 February 2023

== Results ==
=== Heats ===
Qualification: First 6 in each heat (Q) and the next fastest 3 (q) advance to the Final.

Rank	Heat	Athlete	Nationality	Time	Note
1	2	Elzan Bibić	Serbia	7:50.21	Q
2	2	Adel Mechaal	Spain	7:50.69	Q
3	2	James West	Great Britain	7:50.73	Q
4	2	Darragh McElhinney	Ireland	7:51.11	Q
5	2	Charles Grethen	Luxembourg	7:51.30	Q
6	2	Simon Sundström	Sweden	7:51.30	Q, PB
7	2	Robin Hendrix	Belgium	7:51.32	q
8	2	Mike Foppen	Netherlands	7:51.61	q
9	2	Magnus Tuv Myhre	Norway	7:52.47	q, PB
10	2	Mattia Padovani	Italy	7:54.31	SB
11	1	Jakob Ingebrigtsen	Norway	7:56.57	Q, SB
12	1	Bastien Augusto	France	7:56.71	Q
13	1	Sam Parsons	Germany	7:57.18	Q
14	1	Tim Verbaandert	Netherlands	7:57.28	Q
15	1	Jack Rowe	Great Britain	7:57.29	Q
16	1	Emil Danielsson	Sweden	7:57.45	Q
17	1	John Heymans	Belgium	7:57.87	
18	1	Pietro Riva	Italy	7:58.89	
19	1	Joel Ibler Lillesø	Denmark	8:00.48	
20	1	Dario Ivanovski	North Macedonia	8:17.93	

=== Final ===
Rank	Athlete	Nationality	Time	Note
1st place, gold medalist(s)	Jakob Ingebrigtsen	Norway	7:40.32	NR
2nd place, silver medalist(s)	Adel Mechaal	Spain	7:41.75	SB
3rd place, bronze medalist(s)	Elzan Bibić	Serbia	7:44.03	
4	Darragh McElhinney	Ireland	7:44.72	PB
5	Charles Grethen	Luxembourg	7:46.65	
6	Tim Verbaandert	Netherlands	7:47.24	
7	Sam Parsons	Germany	7:48.01	
8	James West	Great Britain	7:48.22	
9	Jack Rowe	Great Britain	7:48.32	
10	Robin Hendrix	Belgium	7:50.46	
11	Mike Foppen	Netherlands	7:50.95	
12	Magnus Tuv Myhre	Norway	7:51.30	PB
13	Simon Sundström	Sweden	7:52.54	
14	Bastien Augusto	France	8:20.60	
	Emil Danielsson	Sweden	DQ	TR17.3.2 (Note: infringement of the inside border)
