= Abdel Laadjel =

Irish athlete (born 2003)

Personal information
- Nationality: Irish
- Born: 9 September 2003 (age 23) Dublin, Ireland

Sport
- Sport: Athletics
- Events: Long-distance running, Cross country running

Achievements and titles
- Personal bests: Mile: 3:59.89 (Boston, 2024); 3000m: 7:48.74 (Boston, 2026); 5000m: 13:24.17 (Boston, 2025); 10,000m: 28:29.17 (Palo Alto, 2025)
Medal record
Men's athletics
Representing Ireland
European Cross Country Championships
Silver medal – second place	2021 Dublin	U20 team

Abdel Laadjel (born 9 September 2003) is an Irish long-distance and cross country runner. He is the Irish under-23 indoor record holder over 5000 metres.

== Early life ==
Born in Dublin, Laadjel attended Kishoge Community College in Lucan, Dublin, before attending the Providence College in Rhode Island in the United States on a full scholarship. In Ireland, he was a member of Donore Harriers, and won the All-Ireland Schools Cross Country championship in March 2020.

== Career ==
Laadjel was a member of the Irish team which won the silver medal in the U20 men's team event at the 2021 European Cross Country Championships in Dublin in December 2021, and was the highest Irish finisher in sixth place. In February 2022, he broke Darragh McElhinney's Irish under-20 5000 metres indoor record, before breaking the Irish U20 10,000 metres record the following month, which had been set in 1970 by Frank Greally.

Laadjel placed fourth at the 2023 European Athletics U23 Championships over 10,000 metres in Espoo, Finland, in a time of 29:23:33.

Laadjel transferred from Providence College to the University of Oregon prior to the start of the 2025 indoor season. Laadjel ran 28:29.17 for the 10,000 metres to move to ninth on the university or Oregon all-time list, at the Stanford Invitational on 4 April 2025.

Laadjel won the individual men's race and the team title with Oregon at the Big Ten Conference cross country championships on 31 October 2025. He had a sixth-place finish at the NCAA West Regional cross country championships on 14 November 2025 at in Sacramento, California, helping the Oregon Ducks to the team title. On 22 November, he had a top-ten finish at the 2025 NCAA Cross Country Championships in Missouri. The following month, competing in Boston, Massachusetts, Laadjel broke Irish U23 indoor record in the 5000m, running 13:24.17 to also move to fourth on the Irish senior indoor all-time list. At the BU Valentine Invitational on 13 February 2026, Laadjel took four seconds off his personal best in the indoor 3000m, running 7:48.74. He ran 14:00.11 in the 5000m on 13 March at the 2026 NCAA Indoor Championships.
