= Ayetullah Aslanhan =

Turkish long-distance runner (born 2001)

Personal information
- Nationality: Turkish
- Born: 1 January 2001 (age 25) Turkey
- Home town: Turkey
- Education: Physical education and Sports at Bitlis Eren University

Sport
- Country: Turkey
- Sport: Long-distance running
- Event(s): 3000 m, 5000 m, 10,000 m, half marathon, cross country running
- Team: Fenerbahçe Athletics
Medal record
Men's Athletics
Representing Turkey
Balkan Championships
Bronze medal – third place	2024 İzmir	5000 m
Bronze medal – third place	2019 Pravets	5000 m
Balkan Indoor Championships
Bronze medal – third place	2025 Belgrade	3000 m
FISU World University Games
Silver medal – second place	2025 Bochum	Half marathon Team
Silver medal – second place	2021 Chengdu	Half marathon Ind.
Gold medal – first place	2021 Chengdu	Half marathon Team
European U20 Championships
Silver medal – second place	2019 Borås	U20 5000 m
European Cross Country Championships
Silver medal – second place	2019 Lisbon	U20 Cross country
Balkan U18 Championships
Gold medal – first place	2018 Istanbul	U18 3000 m
Silver medal – second place	2017 Istanbul	U18 3000 m

Ayetullah Aslanhan (born 1 January 2001) is a Turkish long-distance runner, who competes in the 3000 m, 5000 m, 10,000 m, half marathon as well as cross country running events.

== Personal life ==
Ayetullag Aslanhan was born on 1 January 2001. After completing his secondary education at Private Altınyıldız College Anatolian High School in Nevşehir, he entered Physical Education and Sports College of the Bitlis Eren University. He lives in Bitlis, eastern Turkey.

== Sport career ==
Aslanhan started athletics in 2015 with the support of his older brother. He continued to run long-distance during his high school years. In 2018, he became champion at the Turkish CrossCountry Championships. He is a member of Fenerbahçe Athletics.

Aslanhan took the silver medal in the 3000 m event at the 2017 Balkan U18 Championships held in Istanbul, Turkey.

He captured the gold medal in the 3000 m event at the 2018 Balkan U18 Championships in Istanbul.

He won the silver medal in the 5000 m event at the 2019 European Athletics U20 Championships in Borås, Sweden, the bronze medal in the 5000 m event at the 2019 Balkan Athletics Championships in Pravets, Bulgaria, and another silver medal in the 6 km event of the U20 category at the 2019 European Cross Country Championships in Lisbon, Portugal.

During the COVID-19 pandemic in Turkey, he trained running 20 km every day at the Bitlis 8 Ağustos Stadium under the supervision of the national team coach Fahri Tunçtan.

Aslanhan received the silver medal in the half marathon individual event, and the gold medal in the half marathon team event with teammates Sezgin Ataç, Ömer Amaçtan and Mahsun Değer at the 2021 Summer World University Games in Chengdu, China, which were held in 2023.

In 2024, he became bronze medalist in the 5000 m event at the Balkan Athletics Championships in İzmir, Turkey.

He took the bronze medal in the 3000 m event with 8:21.71 at the 2025 Balkan Athletics Indoor Championships in Belgrade, Serbia. He competed at the 2025 Summer World University Games in Bochum, Germany, and won the silver medal in the half marathon team event with teammates Ramazan Baştuğ, Azat Demirtaş and Ömer Amaçtan.
