= Scott Beattie (runner) =

British athlete (born 1998)

Personal information
- Nationality: British
- Born: 4 December 1998 (age 27) Morpeth, England

Sport
- Sport: Athletics
- Event: Long distance running

Achievements and titles
- Personal bests: 1500m: 3:39.71 (London, 2024); 3000m: 7:43.48 (London, 2024); 5000m: 13:19.41 (Maisons-Laffitte, 2024); 10000m: 27:23.20 (San Juan Capistrano, 2026); 5km (road): 13:32 (Riga, 2023); 10km (road): 27 :41 (Valencia, 2026)

Scott Beattie (born 4 December 1998) is a British long-distance runner. He won the 2023 British national 5 km road running title.

== Biography ==
A former student at the University of Tulsa, Beattie runs for the Morpeth Harriers athletics club. He won the British national 5K run road title in Newcastle upon Tyne in September 2023.

Beattie made his British representative debut in finishing ninth in the 2023 World Athletics Road Running Championships 5 km race in Riga. In January 2024, he placed fourth behind Berihu Aregawi, Aarón Las Heras and Mohamed Katir at the San Silvestre Vallecana, a World Athletics Elite Label road race, in Madrid, Spain, running 27:58 for the 10 km road race.

Beattie finished fourth at the 2024 UK Athletics Championships over 5000 metres. He finished second behind Marc Scott at the UK Athletics 5K Road Running Championships on 6 September 2024.

In November 2024, he finished third at the Liverpool Cross Challenge, which doubled up as the British trials for the European Cross Country Championship. He was subsequently selected for the British team for the 2024 European Cross Country Championships in Antalya, Turkey, however he was unable to travel due to an issue with his passport.

Beattie won the 2025 Liverpool Cross Challenge to gain automatic selection for the 2025 European Cross Country Championships, finishing ahead of fellow Morpeth Harrier Rory Leonard. At the championships, he narrowly missed a bronze medal on a photo finish, credited with the same time as Dominic Lobalu, with the British men’s team placing fourth. Later that month, Beattie won in Newcastle on New Year's Eve over 5 km at the inaugural HogmanHoway race ahead of Aron Gebremariam.

Competing in Valencia on 11 January 2026, he ran a personal best over 10 km, with 27:41, 3 seconds outside the British record. In March, he ran a 10,000 metres personal best of 27:23.20 at The Ten in San Juan Capistrano. On 21 June 2026, he placed fourth over 5000 metres at the 2026 UK Athletics Championships. He was selected to represent England at the 2026 Commonwealth Games in Glasgow, placing fifth with 27:54.50 in the men's 10,000 metres. Representing Great Britain in the 10,000 metres at the 2026 European Athletics Championships in Birmingham on 15 August, he finished 15th in 28:50.35.
