= Henry McLuckie =

British athlete (born 2002)

Personal information
- Nationality: British (Scottish)
- Born: 13 May 2002 (age 24)

Sport
- Sport: Athletics
- Event: Middle-distance running

Achievements and titles
- Personal bests: 1500m: 3:34.17 (Trier, 2025); Mile: 3:51.38 (Dublin, 2026); 3000m 7:36.81 (Cork, 2025); 5000m: 13:36.01 (Los Angeles, 2025); 10,000m: 28:57.18 (London, 2023)
Medal record
Men's athletics
Representing Great Britain
European U20 Championships
Bronze medal – third place	2021 Tallinn	1500 m

Henry McLuckie (born 13 May 2002) is a British middle- and long-distance runner.

== Early life ==
He is from the Isle of Wight and attended Nine Acres Primary School, Christ the King College and the Isle of Wight College before studying sports science at St Mary’s University, Twickenham.

== Career ==
In January 2020 as a junior athlete, he won ahead of Samuel Charig at the Hampshire U20 Cross Country Championships. He had a top-fifteen finish in the individual U20 race was a gold medalist in the team U20 race at the 2021 European Cross Country Championships, as part of the British team including Will Barnicoat and Hamish Armitt, in Dublin. He was a bronze medalist over 1500 metres at the 2021 European Athletics U20 Championships in Tallinn.

In May 2023, he ran 13:36.26 for the 5000 metres in Walnut, California before running 28:57.18 for the 10,000 metres at the Great Britain 10,000m Championships, held at the Night Of The 10,000 PBs, at Parliament Hill Fields in London. He ran 13:52.11 for seventh in the 5000 metres at the 2023 European Athletics U23 Championships in Espoo, Finland. In Stirling at the Monument Mile in August 2023, he improved his personal best over the mile to 3:57.69.

Indoors in 2024, he ran personal best times of 3:56.56 for the mile and 7:47.18 for 3000m before winning the Friday Night Under the Lights event over 5 km on the road in Battersea, London. He won the BMC Gold Classic in Watford in August 2024 over 1500 metres, in a time of 3:38.33. In November 2024, he was named by British Athletics on the Olympic Futures Programme for 2025.

In February 2025, he was a pacemaker for Grant Fisher as he set a new 5000 metres world record in Boston, Massachusetts. He placed third overall himself in the 3000 metres at the 2025 British Indoor Athletics Championships in Birmingham, on 23 February 2025, running 7:48.88. He set a meeting record of 7:36.81 for the 3000 metres in July 2025 in Cork. That month, he also lowered his personal best to 3:34.73 for the 1500 metres whilst racing in Belgium. In August, he won the Monument Mile in Stirling in a time of 3:53.99. In October 2025, he was retained on the British Athletics Olympic Futures Programme for 2025/26.

On 15 February, McLuckie ran 7:51.70 to place second in the 3000 metres at the 2026 British Indoor Athletics Championships in Birmingham, finishing narrowly behind Tom Keen (7:51.68). In May, he ran 7:43.64 to win the 3000m at The Belfast Classic and broke the stadium record previously belonging to Steve Ovett. In July, he ran a personal best in the mile run of 3:51.38 at the Morton Games in Dublin.
