= 2023 European Athletics U23 Championships – Men's 10,000 metres =

Men's 10,000 metres at the 2023 European Athletics U23 Championships
- Venue: Leppävaara Stadium
- Location: Espoo, Finland
- Dates: 15 July
- Competitors: 26 from 14 nations
- Winning time: 29:08.33

Medalists
| gold medal | Rory Leonard | Great Britain |
| silver medal | Francesco Guerra | Italy |
| bronze medal | Miguel Baidal | Spain |

The men's 10,000 metres event at the 2023 European Athletics U23 Championships was held in Espoo, Finland, at Leppävaara Stadium on 15 July.

== Records ==
Prior to the competition, the records were as follows:

| European U23 record | Ali Kaya (TUR) | 27:24.09 | Mersin, Turkey | 2 May 2015 |
| Championship U23 record | Ali Kaya (TUR) | 27:53.38 | Tallinn, Estonia | 9 July 2015 |

== Results ==
| Place | Athlete | Nation | Time | Notes |
|---|---|---|---|---|
| 1st place, gold medalist(s) | Rory Leonard | Great Britain | 29:08.33 | |
| 2nd place, silver medalist(s) | Francesco Guerra | Italy | 29:11.86 | |
| 3rd place, bronze medalist(s) | Miguel Baidal | Spain | 29:14.91 | |
| 4 | Abdel Laadjel | Ireland | 29:23.33 | |
| 5 | Sebastian Frey | Austria | 29:29.02 | |
| 6 | Ayetullah Aslanhan | Turkey | 29:32.58 | |
| 7 | Mateusz Gos | Poland | 29:37.65 | |
| 8 | Antonin Marquant | France | 29:43.10 | |
| 9 | Adria Ceballos | Spain | 29:45.03 | |
| 10 | Philip Massacand | Norway | 29:48.75 | |
| 11 | Ömer Amaçtan | Turkey | 29:50.68 | |
| 12 | Nicolò Bedini | Italy | 29:52.10 | |
| 13 | Noah Konteh | Belgium | 30:01.88 | |
| 14 | Mario Priego | Spain | 30:04.35 | |
| 15 | Adisu Guadia | Israel | 30:05.39 | |
| 16 | Tom Förster | Germany | 30:11.52 | |
| 17 | Addiso Bitew | Israel | 30:21.69 | |
| 18 | Assaf Harari | Israel | 30:24.04 | |
| 19 | İsmail Taşyürek | Turkey | 30:32.70 | |
| 20 | Tomer Tarragano | Great Britain | 30:33.52 | |
| 21 | François Guilhot | France | 30:38.17 | |
| 22 | Ibrahim Buras | Norway | 30:49.64 | |
| 23 | Jacinto Gaspar | Portugal | 30:58.22 | |
| 24 | Abdullahi Dahir Rabi | Norway | 31:18.49 | SB |
| — | Konjoneh Maggi | Italy | DNF | |
| — | Nikolaos Stamoulis | Greece | DNF | |
