= Sam Parsons (runner) =

German-American distance runner (born 1994)

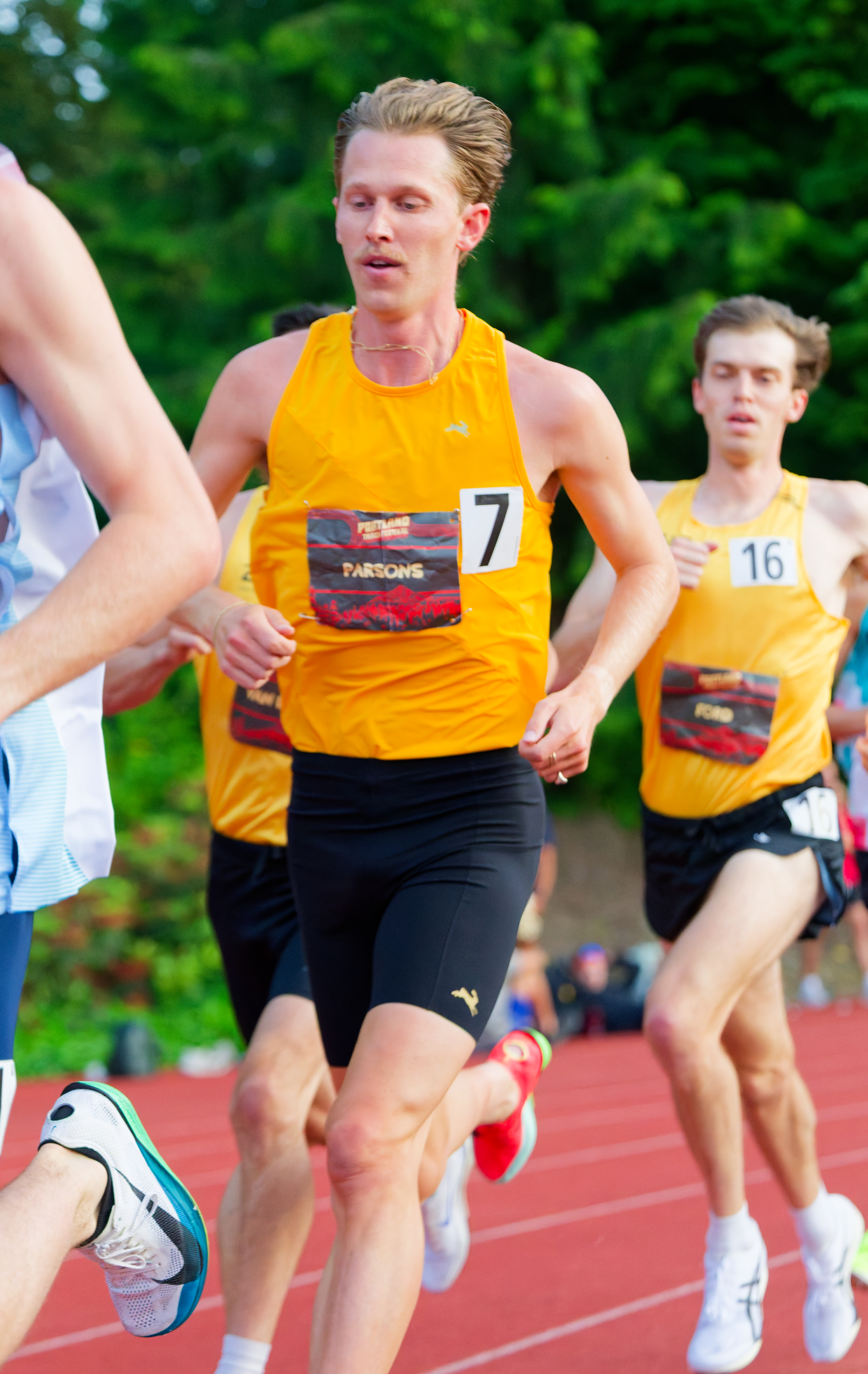
- Parsons in 2025

Personal information
- Citizenship: United States; Germany
- Born: June 18, 1994 (age 32) Wilmington, Delaware, United States
- Education: Tatnall School; NC State University
- Employer: Adidas

Sport
- Country: Germany (since 2019)
- Sport: Track and field
- Event: 5000 m
- University team: North Carolina State Wolfpack
- Club: Tinman Elite
- Turned pro: 2017
- Coached by: Joan Hunter

Achievements and titles
- Personal bests: 1500 m: 3:36.22 (Berlin 2022); Mile: 3:54.08 (Pfungstadt 2023); 3000 m: 7:38.06i (Boston 2025); 5000 m: 13:12.69 (Oordegem 2025); 10,000 m: 28:43.74 (Palo Alto 2017)

Sam Parsons (born June 18, 1994) is a German-American long-distance runner. He attended the Tatnall School of Wilmington, Delaware and later competed on the collegiate level at North Carolina State University. In 2019, he gained German citizenship and has since represented the country at the 2019, 2022, and 2023 World Athletics Championships.

== Athletics career ==
=== High school ===
Parsons was coached by Patrick Castagno and competed in cross country or track and field all 12 seasons. Parsons raced a personal best of 1:58 in the 800 meters, 4:12 in the mile, 9:00 in the 3200 meters, and 14:47 in the 5000 meters at New Balance Indoor Nationals. Parsons also individually qualified for Nike Cross Nationals as a senior. Parsons led his team to multiple state championships, including going undefeated during the 2012 season by winning the cross country, indoor track, and outdoor track Delaware state championships for the Tatnall School.

=== College ===
Parsons ran for Rollie Geiger at North Carolina State. He achieved personal bests of 3:44 in the 1500 meters, 13:52 in the 5000 meters, and 28:43 in the 10,000 meters. In cross country, Parsons was a four-time participant at the NCAA Cross Country Championship placing as high as 51st during his final cross country season at the 2016 NCAA Men's Division I Cross Country Championships with a time of 30:33 for 10,000 meters.

=== Professional ===
In 2018, Parsons traveled to Germany to visit his mother’s native country. He was hesitant to continue in track but decided to turn pro by signing a three-year deal with Adidas in 2018. Parsons teamed with Drew Hunter to found the professional running team, Tinman Elite.

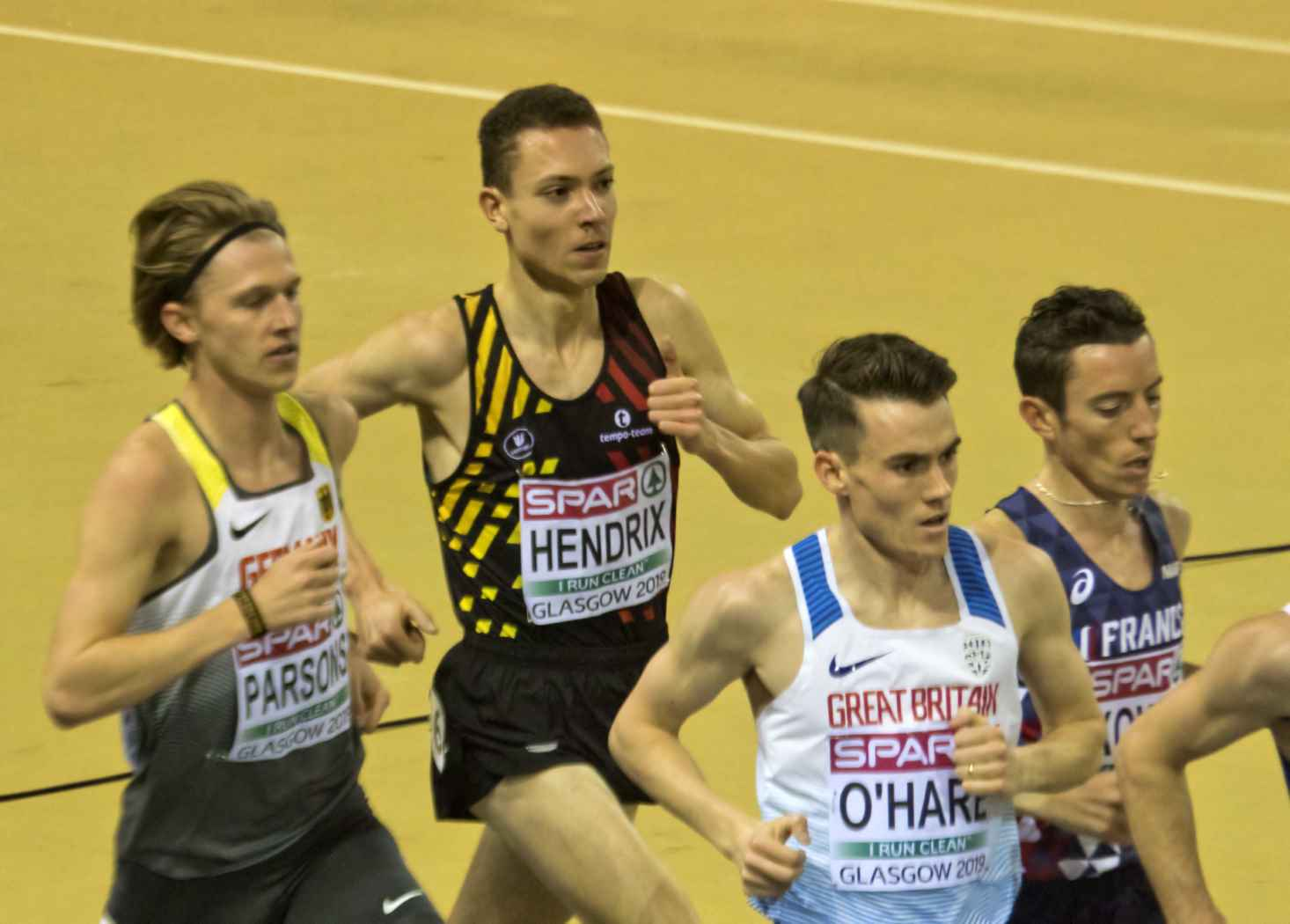
Parsons (left) at the 2019 European Athletics Indoor Championships

==== 2019 ====
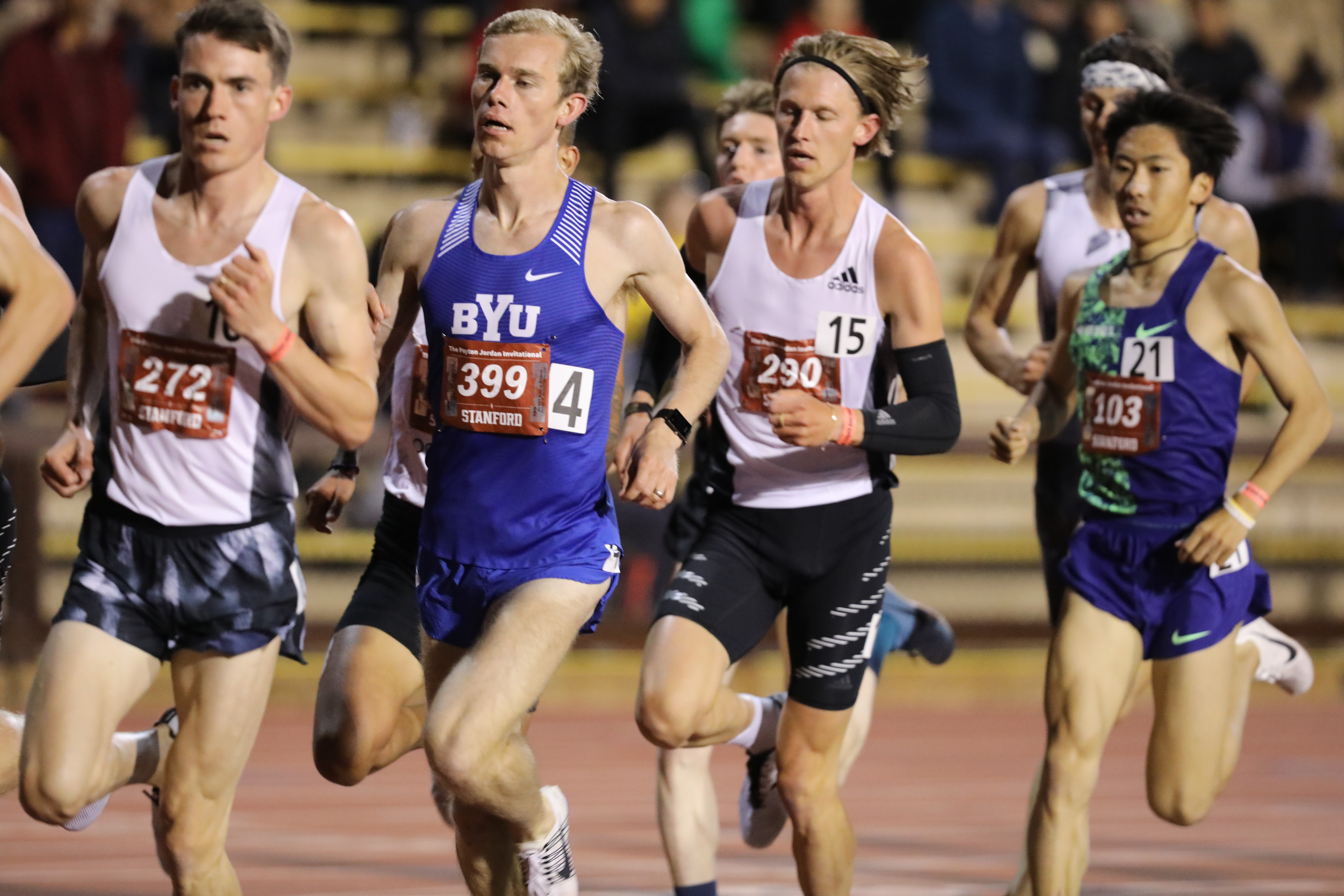
Parsons (second from right) at the 2019 Payton Jordan Invitational

In February 2019, Parsons acquired German citizenship in an attempt to qualify for the 2020 Summer Olympics in the 5000 metres. At the Payton Jordan Invitational (April 2019) Parsons ran with two of his teammates (Drew Hunter and Jordan Gusman) in an attempt to meet the World Championships qualifying standard (13:22.5) in the 5,000 m. Parsons ran 13:22.32; right behind his teammates who ran 13:21. He would go on to represent Germany 5000 m at the 2019 World Athletics Championships held in Doha, Qatar. He did not advance to the final.

==== 2022 ====
Parsons competed in the 3000 m at the 2022 World Athletics Indoor Championships, finishing seventh in his qualifying heat, not advancing to the final. In April 2022, Parsons became the first person to break 4 minutes in the mile on Delaware soil, running 3:58.17 on the track of his alma mater, Tatnall High School. In May, he ran a 5000 m personal best of 13:21.17 to take tenth at the Track Meet in San Juan Capistrano, California.

Following a second place finish at the German Championships, he was selected to compete at the 2022 World Championships in Eugene, Oregon in the 5000 m. He advanced to the final as a time qualifier with a 13:24.50 in the first round and ran 13:45.89 to place 15th in the final. Later that summer, he competed at the 2022 European Athletics Championships, placing sixth over 5000 m.

==== 2023 ====
In January 2023, Parsons ran a 5000 m personal best of 13:12.78 at Boston University, setting a German indoor record in the process. In February, he ran a 3000 m personal best of 7:39.94 at the Millrose Games in New York City and the following month finished seventh at the 2023 European Athletics Indoor Championships over 3000 m.

He competed in the 5000 m at the World Championships in Budapest, Hungary. However with 900 metres to go in his qualifying heat, he tripped, dashing his hopes of making another world final.

== Championships results ==
Representing Germany
Year	Competition	Venue	Position	Event	Time
2019	European Indoor Championships	Glasgow, Scotland	12th	3000 m	8:05.83
2019	World Championships	Doha, Qatar	24th	5000 m	13:38.53
2022	World Indoor Championships	Belgrade, Serbia	18th	3000 m	7:55.97
2022	World Championships	Eugene, OR, United States	15th	5000 m	13:45.89
2022	European Championships	Munich, Germany	6th	5000 m	13:30.38
2023	European Indoor Championships	Istanbul, Turkey	7th	3000 m	7:48.01
2023	World Championships	Budapest, Hungary	39th	5000 m	14:03.14
2025	European Indoor Championships	Apeldoorn, Netherlands	18th (h)	3000 m	7:56.68
2025	World Indoor Championships	Nanjing, China	12th	3000 m	7:54.15
