= Jessica Gibbon =

British athlete (born 1996)

Personal information
- Nationality: British
- Born: 19 August 1996 (age 29)

Sport
- Sport: Athletics
- Event: Long distance running
Medal record
Representing Great Britain
European Cross Country Championships
| Gold medal – first place | 2021 Dublin | Team |
| Silver medal – second place | 2024 Antalya | Team |

Jessica Gibbon (born 19 August 1996) is a British cross country runner. She won the 2022 and 2025 English National Cross Country Championships.

== Early life ==
From Henley-on-Thames, she competed for Oxfordshire in inter-counties cross country and was a junior British international athlete.

== Career ==
She is a member of Reading Athletic Club. In January 2020, she won the South of England Cross Country Championships. The following month, she was the Southern Area champion at the Senior Women's Cross-Country Championships in Nottingham. She won the Milton Keynes Cross Country challenge in 2021. She was a gold medalist in the team event at the 2021 European Cross Country Championships in Dublin, finishing eleventh in the individual race to be the third Brit across the line counting to the tally.

She finished seventh in the Home Countries Cross Country International in Dundonald, Northern Ireland on 22 January 2022. In February 2022, she won the South of England cross country championships and the English National Cross Country Championships. She was part of the British team which won the silver medal at the 2022 European Cross Country Championships, placing fourteenth overall in the individual race.

She won the South of England cross country championships in Beckenham in January 2024. She then won the Lotto Cross Cup in Belgium in February 2024. In October 2024, she became only the second British runner after Roger Hackney to win the Roeselare cross country in Belgium, part of the 2024/2025 CrossCup series. She was selected for the British team for the 2024 European Cross Country Championships in Antalya, Turkey, where she finished twelfth to help Britain win the silver medal in the team race.

In February 2025, she was selected to represent England at the 2025 Home Countries International. That month, she won the English National cross-country title in Parliament Hill. The following month, she won the UK Athletics Cross Challenge Final and UK Inter Counties Championships in Nottingham.

On 8 November 2025, she had a top-ten finish in the women's 6.4 km race at the Cardiff Cross Challenge in Wales, a gold race part of the World Athletics Cross Country Tour. In January 2026, she placed sixth at the Lotto Cross Cup de Hannut in Belgium. The following month, she had a fourth place finish at the English National Cross Country Championships in Sedgefield. On 7 March, she retained her title at the UK Athletics Cross Challenge Final and UK Inter Counties Championships in Nottingham.
