= 2026 European Athletics Championships – Men's 5000 metres =

Men's 5000 metres at the 2026 European Athletics Championships
- Venue: Alexander Stadium
- Location: Birmingham, United Kingdom
- Dates: 10 August 2026
- Competitors: 24 (entered)
- Winning time: 13:15.29

Medalists
gold medal	Jakob Ingebrigtsen	Norway
silver medal	Florian Bremm	Germany
bronze medal	Etienne Daguinos	France

The men's 5000 metres at the 2026 European Athletics Championships took place at the Alexander Stadium in Birmingham, United Kingdom, on 10 August 2026.

== Background ==
Records before the 2026 European Athletics Championships
Record	Athlete (nation)	Time	Location	Date
World record	Joshua Cheptegei (UGA)	12:35.36	Fontvieille, Monaco	14 August 2020
European record	Andreas Almgren (SWE)	12:44.27	Stockholm, Sweden	15 June 2025
Championship record	Jack Buckner (GBR)	13:10.15	Stuttgart, West Germany	31 August 1986
World leading	Addisu Yihune (ETH)	12:47.62	Oslo, Norway	10 June 2026
European leading	Andreas Almgren (SWE)	12:48.61	Oslo, Norway	10 June 2026

== Qualification ==
For the men's 5000 metres, the qualification period was from 27 July 2025 to 26 July 2026. Athletes qualified by running the entry standard of 13:08.00 min or faster, by wildcard for the 2024 European Athletics Champion, or by their position on the World Athletics Rankings for the event. The target number was 25 athletes.

Qualification standings per 31 July 2026
QP	CP	Country	Athlete	PB	SB	Status	Details
1	1	Norway	Jakob Ingebrigtsen	12:48.45	–	Qualified by Wild Card	Defending European Champion
2	1	Switzerland	Dominic Lokinyomo Lobalu	12:50.87	12:52.54	Qualified by Entry Standard	12:52.54 - Stade Louis II, Monaco (MON) - 10 JUL 2026
3	1	Germany	Florian Bremm	12:56.80	12:56.80	Qualified by Entry Standard	12:56.80 - Paavo Nurmen Stadion, Turku (FIN) - 03 JUN 2026
4	1	France	Jimmy Gressier	12:51.59	12:57.79	Qualified by Entry Standard	12:57.79 - Stade Charléty, Paris (FRA) - 28 JUN 2026
5	2	Germany	Mohamed Abdilaahi	12:53.63	12:57.90	Qualified by Entry Standard	12:57.90 - Egret Stadium, Xiamen (CHN) - 23 MAY 2026
6	1	Belgium	Isaac Kimeli	12:56.53	13:13.17	Qualified by Entry Standard	12:58.78 - National Stadium, Tokyo (JPN) - 21 SEP 2025
7	1	Portugal	José Carlos Pinto	12:59.75	12:59.75	Qualified by Entry Standard	12:59.75 - Stadion De Veen, Heusden-Zolder (BEL) - 18 JUL 2026
8	2	France	Etienne Daguinos	12:55.76	13:01.92	Qualified by Entry Standard	13:01.92 - Stade Louis II, Monaco (MON) - 10 JUL 2026
9	1	Ireland	Darragh McElhinney	13:02.06	13:15.90	Qualified by Entry Standard	13:02.06 - Putbosstadion, Oordegem (BEL) - 09 AUG 2025
10	1	Netherlands	Mahadi Abdi Ali	13:04.05	13:22.34	Qualified by Entry Standard	13:04.05 - Putbosstadion, Oordegem (BEL) - 09 AUG 2025
11	2	Ireland	Nicholas Griggs	13:05.75	13:16.19	Qualified by Entry Standard	13:05.75 - Putbosstadion, Oordegem (BEL) - 09 AUG 2025
12	2	Netherlands	Mike Foppen	13:02.43	13:19.47	Qualified by Entry Standard	13:05.94 - National Stadium, Tokyo (JPN) - 21 SEP 2025
13	3	Netherlands	Tim Verbaandert	13:06.14	13:13.34	Qualified by Entry Standard	13:06.14 - Putbosstadion, Oordegem (BEL) - 09 AUG 2025
14	2	Norway	Magnus Tuv Myhre	13:06.98	13:32.08	Qualified by Entry Standard	13:06.98 - Putbosstadion, Oordegem (BEL) - 09 AUG 2025
15	3	Ireland	Brian Fay	13:01.40	13:13.30	Qualified by World Rankings	21st - 1180 points
16	3	Norway	Andreas Fjeld Halvorsen	13:18.44	13:18.44	Qualified by World Rankings	26th - 1160 points
17	1	Great Britain & N.I.	James West	13:09.07	13:23.49	Qualified by World Rankings	29th - 1149 points
18	1	Serbia	Elzan Bibić	13:13.06	–	Qualified by World Rankings	30th - 1148 points
19	1	Denmark	Joel Ibler Lillesø	13:14.98	13:22.77	Qualified by World Rankings	31st - 1143 points
20	1	Lithuania	Simas Bertašius	13:25.92	13:25.92	Qualified by World Rankings	36th - 1135 points
21	4	Norway	Filip Ingebrigtsen	13:11.75	13:22.06	Qualified by World Rankings	38th - 1132 points
22	1	Italy	Francesco Guerra	13:21.59	13:21.59	Qualified by World Rankings	39th - 1130 points
23	1	Finland	Tuomas Heikkilä	13:25.85	13:25.85	Qualified by World Rankings	50th - 1118 points
24	2	Italy	Konjoneh Maggi	13:24.05	13:24.05	Qualified by World Rankings	55th - 1112 points
25	3	Italy	Sebastiano Parolini	13:25.71	13:34.63	Qualified by World Rankings	63rd - 1101 points
reserve	1	Austria	Kevin Kamenschak	13:36.43	13:36.43	Next best by World Rankings	64th - 1101 points
reserve	1	Israel	Matan Ivri	13:23.11	13:23.11	Next best by World Rankings	67th - 1097 points

Bye to semi-finals	Reserve activated	Withdrawal / reserve unused

== Schedule ==
Date	Time	Round
10 August 2026	20:40	Final

All times are local times (UTC+1)

== Results ==
Place	Athlete	Nation	Time	Notes
1st place, gold medalist(s)	Jakob Ingebrigtsen	Norway	13:15.29	SB
2nd place, silver medalist(s)	Florian Bremm	Germany	13:15.60	
3rd place, bronze medalist(s)	Etienne Daguinos	France	13:16.09	
4	Jimmy Gressier	France	13:16.36	
5	Magnus Tuv Myhre	Norway	13:16.59	SB
6	Mahadi Abdi Ali	Netherlands	13:17.17	SB
7	Dominic Lokinyomo Lobalu	Switzerland	13:18.24	
8	Nick Griggs	Ireland	13:21.07	
9	Isaac Kimeli	Belgium	13:23.17	
10	Tim Verbaandert	Netherlands	13:23.23	
11	Mike Foppen	Netherlands	13:23.67	
12	James West	Great Britain & N.I.	13:24.63	
13	Tuomas Heikkilä	Finland	13:30.64	
14	Brian Fay	Ireland	13:31.15	
15	Joel Ibler Lillesø	Denmark	13:32.58	
16	Francesco Guerra	Italy	13:33.30	
17	Simas Bertašius	Lithuania	13:36.22	
18	Darragh McElhinney	Ireland	13:37.62	
19	Konjoneh Maggi	Italy	13:39.79	
20	Sebastiano Parolini	Italy	13:41.30	
21	Andreas Fjeld Halvorsen	Norway	14:00.73	
—	Filip Ingebrigtsen	Norway	DNF	
—	José Carlos Pinto	Portugal	DNF	
