= Tim Verbaandert =

Dutch long-distance runner

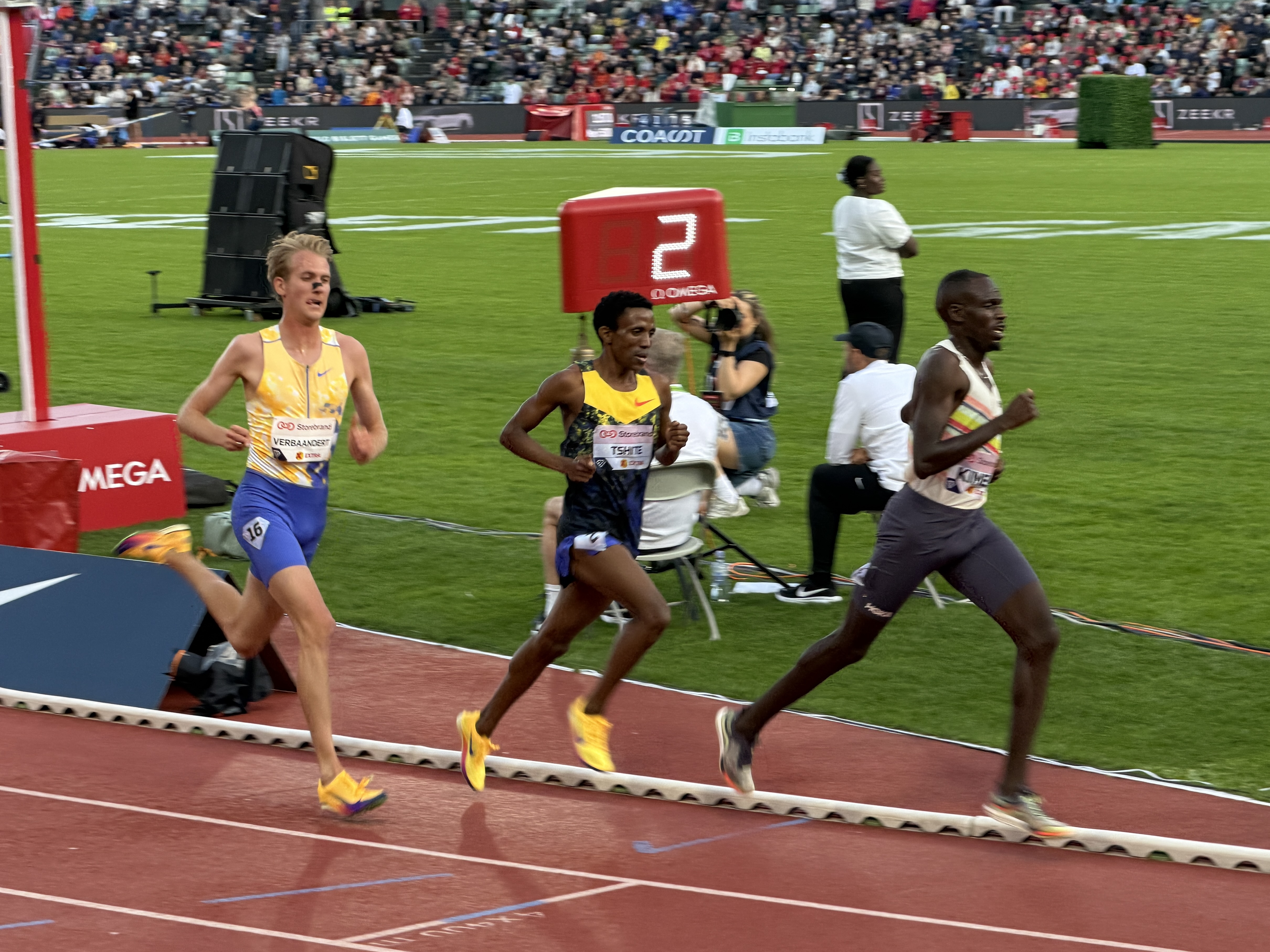
- Verbaandert at the 2026 Bislett Games

Personal information
- Born: 17 July 2000 (age 26)

Sport
- Sport: Athletics
- Events: Middle-distance running, Long-distance running

Achievements and titles
- Personal bests: 800m: 1:54.75 (2020); 1500m: 3:32.60 (2025); 3000m: 7:30.42 (2026) NR; 5000m: 13:06.14 (2025); Road; 5k: 13:25 (2026); 10k: 27:17 (2026) NR

Tim Verbaandert (born 17 July 2000) is a Dutch middle- and long-distance runner. He won the 2025 and 2026 Dutch Athletics Championships over 5000 metres and in 2026 set a Dutch national record in the 10k run.

== Biography ==
A member of Eindhoven Atletiek, he played locally as a footballer before focusing on athletics. Verbaandert won the Dutch national indoor titles over both 1500 metres and 3000 metres in February 2022. That year, he had a top-twenty finish at the 2022 European Cross Country Championships in Turin, Italy.

Verbaandert won the Dutch national indoor title over 3000 metres in February 2023. He placed sixth overall at the 2023 European Athletics Indoor Championships in Istanbul in the men's 3000 metres.

From October 2024, Verbaandert has been training with coach Tomasz Lewandowski. Verbaandert won the Dutch national indoor title over 3000 metres in February 2025 in Apeldoorn. He won the Dutch outdoor championships over 5000 metres in August 2025 in Hengelo.

On 15 February 2026, Verbaandert won a 5k run in Monaco on the road with a time of 13:25 to set a new Dutch national record. Competing in Lille, France, over 10 kilometres on the road, he ran 27:17 a new Dutch national record on 4 April 2026. At the 2026 Shanghai Diamond League meeting on May 16, he improved the 3000 metres national record to 7:30.42. In July, he retained his title over 5000 metres at the Dutch Outdoor Championships. In August, he competed at the 2026 European Athletics Championships in Birmingham, England, in the 5000 metres, placing tenth overall.

== Personal life ==
He is from Veldhoven but was later based at Sportcentrum Papendal in Arnhem, training daily with fellow runners such as Niels Laros and Stefan Nillessen.
