= Ömer Amaçtan =

Turkish long-distance runner (born 2001)

Personal information
- Nationality: Turkish
- Born: 5 May 2001 (age 25) Çaldiran, Van Province, Turkey
- Home town: Turkey
- Education: Erciyes University

Sport
- Country: Turkey
- Sport: Long-distance running
- Event(s): 3000 m, 5000 m, 10,000 m, half marathon, cross country running
- Team: Enka SK
Medal record
Men's Athletics
Representing Turkey
FISU World University Games
Silver medal – second place	2025 Bochum	Half marathon Team
Gold medal – first place	2021 Chengdu	Half marathon Team
Balkan Championships
Bronze medal – third place	2022 Craiova	3000 m
Bronze medal – third place	2021 Smederevo	3000 m
Bronze medal – third place	2020 Cluj-Napoca	3000 m
Bronze medal – third place	2020 Cluj-Napoca	5000 m
European U20 Championships
Bronze medal – third place	2019 Borås	U20 3000 m
European U18 Championships
Silver medal – second place	2018 Győr	U18 3000 m
European Cross Country Championships
Bronze medal – third place	2017 Šamorín	Junior Team
European Youth Summer Olympic Festival
Gold medal – first place	2017 Győr	Youth 3000

Ömer Amaçtan (born 5 May 2001) is a Turkish long-distance runner, who competes in the 3000 m, 5000 m, 10,000 m, half marathon as well as in the cross country running events.

== Personal life ==
Ömer Amaçtan was born in Çaldıran district of Van Province, eastern Turkey on 5 May 2001. Due to financial difficulties in the family, he had to work at an early age in consturctions to earn his living during his school years. He is a student of Physical Education and Sport Teaching at Erciyes University in Kayseri.

== Sport career ==
Amaçtan started sport during his school years. He became Turkish and Balkan champion in 2013, Balkan champion and third-placed between 2015 and 2017. He was admitted to the Olympics Preparation Center (TOHM) in Erzurum in 2018, where he continued his education and was trained at the same time. He later moved to the TOHM in Kayseri. Before he transferred to Enka SK, he was a member of Fenerbahçe Athletics.

He captured the gold medal in the 3000 m event at the 2017 European Youth Summer Olympic Festival held in Győr, Hungary. He and his teammates Ramazan Barbaros and Abdurrahman Gediklioğlu received the bronze medal in the junior team event at the 2017 European Cross Country Championships in Šamorín, Slovakia.

In 2018, he took the silver medal in the 3000 m event at the European Athletics U18 Championships in Győr, Hungary. At the 2018 Summer Youth Olympics in Buenos Aires, Argentina, he finished the 3000 m event in 8th place.

He took the bronze medal in the 3000 m event at the 2019 European Athletics U20 Championships in Borås, Sweden.

Amaçtan won two bronze medals in the 3000 m and 5000 m events at the 2020 Balkan Athletics Championships in Cluj-Napoca, Romania.

He was qualified for the 2021 European Athletics U23 Championships after running the 10,000 m in Bursa, Turkey in his personal best time of 29.38. He finished the 10,000 m event in 10th place at the 2021 European Athletics U23 Championships in Tallinn, Estonia. At the 2021 Balkan Athletics Championships in Smederevo, Serbia, he became bronze medalist in the 3000 m event. The same year at the European Athletics U23 Championships, he ranked 18th in the 5000 m event.

The 2022 European 10,000m Cup in Pacé, France, he placed 30th. That year, he won the bronze medal in the 3000 m event at the Balkan Athletics Championships in Craiova, Romania.

The 2023 European 10,000m Cup in Pacé, France, he did not finish. In the 10,000 m event at the 2023 European Athletics U23 Championships in Espoo, Finland, he ranked 11th. The same year, at the rescheduled 2021 Summer World University Games in Chengdu, China, he and his teammates Sezgin Ataç, Ayetullah Aslanhan and Mahsun Değer captured the gold medal in the half marathon team event.

At the 2025 International Adana Half Marathon, he placed third. He competed at the 2025 Summer World University Games in Bochum, Germany, and won the silver medal in the half marathon team event with teammates Ramazan Baştuğ, Azat Demirtaş and Ayetullah Aslanhan.
