= Athletics at the 2021 Summer World University Games – Men's half marathon =

The men's half marathon event at the 2021 Summer World University Games was held on 6 August 2023 at the Shuangliu Sports Centre Stadium in Chengdu, China.

== Medalists ==
Gold	Silver	Bronze
Sezgin Ataç; Turkey	Ayetullah Aslanhan; Turkey	Yang Kegu; China
Turkey; Sezgin Ataç; Ayetullah Aslanhan; Ömer Amaçtan; Mahsum Değer	China; Yang Kegu; Ma Rui; Ma Yujie; Chen Tianyu; Wang Congzheng	Japan; Reishi Yoshida; Kotaro Shinohara; Rei Matsunaga

== Results ==
=== Individual ===
Rank	Name	Nationality	Time	Notes
1st place, gold medalist(s)	Sezgin Ataç	Turkey	1:04:36	
2nd place, silver medalist(s)	Ayetullah Aslanhan	Turkey	1:04:37	PB
3rd place, bronze medalist(s)	Yang Kegu	China	1:04:48	
4	Reishi Yoshida	Japan	1:05:00	
5	Ömer Amaçtan	Turkey	1:05:18	
6	Kotaro Shinohara	Japan	1:05:39	
7	Leonid Latsepov	Estonia	1:06:05	
8	Isaac Chelimo	Uganda	1:06:10	PB
9	Ma Rui	China	1:06:11	
10	Sam Cheptegei	Uganda	1:06:13	PB
11	Ma Yujie	China	1:06:14	
12	Rei Matsunaga	Japan	1:06:39	
13	Kelvin Chepsigor	Kenya	1:06:56	
14	Arun Rathod	India	1:06:56	
15	Henrik Laukli	Norway	1:07:05	
16	Collins Kgadima	South Africa	1:07:27	
17	Chris Mhlanga	South Africa	1:07:32	PB
18	Brian Wangwe	Uganda	1:07:33	PB
19	Nodirbek Mutalipov	Uzbekistan	1:07:34	
20	Seth Akampa	Uganda	1:07:41	
21	Shin Yong-min	South Korea	1:07:42	
22	Chen Tianyu	China	1:07:50	
23	Tim Vincent	Australia	1:07:59	
24	Lee Joon-su	South Korea	1:09:24	
25	Wang Congzheng	China	1:09:27	
26	Mahsum Değer	Turkey	1:09:48	
27	Vincent Lam	Hong Kong	1:10:49	
28	Harrison Bagley	Australia	1:11:05	
29	Attila Arany	Hungary	1:12:33	
30	Chou Hsien-feng	Chinese Taipei	1:12:56	
31	Chong See Yeung	Hong Kong	1:13:43	
32	Serame Gumede	South Africa	1:14:53	
33	Cho Min-hyeok	South Korea	1:17:56	
–	Themba Thingane	South Africa	DNF	
–	Imad Al-Farsi	Oman	DNF	
–	Wong Wan Chun	Hong Kong	DNS	
–	Abdurrahman Gedikoğlu	Turkey	DNS	

=== Team ===
Rank	Nation	Athletes	Time	Notes
1st place, gold medalist(s)	Turkey	Sezgin Ataç; Ayetullah Aslanhan; Ömer Amaçtan; Mahsum Değer	3:14:31	
2nd place, silver medalist(s)	China	Yang Kegu; Ma Rui; Ma Yujie	3:17:12	
3rd place, bronze medalist(s)	Japan	Reishi Yoshida; Kotaro Shinohara; Rei Matsunaga	3:17:18	
4	Uganda	Isaac Chelimo; Sam Cheptegei; Brian Wangwe	3:19:56	
5	South Africa	Collins Kgadima; Chris Mhlanga; Serame Gumede; Themba Thingane	3:29:52	
6	South Korea	Shin Yong-min; Lee Joon-su; Cho Min-hyeok	3:35:02	
