= 2022 European Athletics Championships – Men's 5000 metres =

Men's 5000 metres at the 2022 European Athletics Championships
- Location: Munich
- Dates: 16 August 2022
- Competitors: 24 from 13 nations
- Winning time: 13:21.13

Medalists
gold medal	Jakob Ingebrigtsen	Norway
silver medal	Mohamed Katir	Spain
bronze medal	Yemaneberhan Crippa	Italy

The men's 5000 metres at the 2022 European Athletics Championships took place at the Olympiastadion on 17 August.

== Records ==
Standing records prior to the 2022 European Athletics Championships
World record	Joshua Cheptegei (UGA)	12:35.36	Monaco	14 August 2020
European record	Jakob Ingebrigtsen (NOR)	12:48.45	Florence, Italy	10 June 2021
Championship record	Jack Buckner (GBR)	13:10.15	Stuttgart, West Germany	31 August 1986
World Leading	Nicholas Kimeli (KEN)	12:46.33	Rome, Italy	9 June 2022
Europe Leading	Jakob Ingebrigtsen (NOR)	13:03.02	San Juan Capistrano, United States	6 May 2022

== Schedule ==
Date	Time	Round
16 August 2022	21:08	Final

All times are local times (UTC+2)

== Results ==
The start on 21:08.

Rank	Name	Nationality	Time	Note
1st place, gold medalist(s)	Jakob Ingebrigtsen	Norway	13:21.13	
2nd place, silver medalist(s)	Mohamed Katir	Spain	13:22.98	SB
3rd place, bronze medalist(s)	Yemaneberhan Crippa	Italy	13:24.83	
4	Andreas Almgren	Sweden	13:26.48	PB
5	Mike Foppen	Netherlands	13:27.93	
6	Sam Parsons	Germany	13:30.38	
7	Andrew Butchart	Great Britain	13:31.47	
8	Brian Fay	Ireland	13:31.87	
9	Sam Atkin	Great Britain	13:32.35	
10	Jonas Glans	Sweden	13:32.71	
11	Isaac Kimeli	Belgium	13:33.39	
12	Abdessamad Oukhelfen	Spain	13:33.63	
13	Pietro Riva	Italy	13:34.09	
14	Adel Mechaal	Spain	13:35.92	
15	Jonas Raess	Switzerland	13:36.18	
16	Darragh McElhinney	Ireland	13:39.11	
17	Narve Gilje Nordås	Norway	13:39.12	
18	Elzan Bibić	Serbia	13:39.60	
19	Hugo Hay	France	13:45.63	
20	Davor Aaron Bienenfeld	Germany	13:45.70	
21	Patrick Dever	Great Britain	13:45.89	
22	Joel Ibler Lillesø	Denmark	13:50.24	
23	Michael Somers	Belgium	13:57.82	
24	Felix Bour	France	14:05.84	
