= Aron Gebremariam =

Eritrean long-distance runner (born 2006)

Personal information
- Born: 21 July 2006 (age 20)

Sport
- Sport: Athletics
- Events: Long-distance running, Cross country running

Achievements and titles
- Personal bests: 1500: 3:42.45 (2024); 3000m: 7:48.77 (2025); 5000m: 13:15.06 (2026); Road; 5k: 13:32 (2025)

Aron Gebremariam (born 21 July 2006) is an Eritrean long-distance runner based in England. He represented the Athlete Refugee Team at the 2026 World Athletics Road Running Championships.

== Biography ==
Born in Eritrea, Gebremariam moved to England as a refugee, displaced by war. A member of Birchfield Harriers in Birmingham, England, he won the English Schools' Athletic Association Cross Country Championships in March 2024. That month, he also won the UK Athletics U20 Cross Challenge Final and UK Inter Counties Championships. He retained his U20 title the following year in Nottingham, finishing ahead of William Rabjohns in March 2025.

He became the English Schools 3000m champion and improved his 5km best to 13:31 in May 2025. He ran a personal best in the 5000m of 13:36.71 the BMC Grand prix in Birmingham in June 2025. Gebremariam was announced In June 2025 by The International Olympic Committee as one of the refugees receiving Olympic Solidarity Scholarships. On 31 December 2025, he was runner-up to Scott Beattie in Newcastle on New Year's Eve over 5km at the inaugural HogmanHoway race.

In June 2026, he won The London 5000 at Parliament Hill, running a 5000 metres personal best of 13:26.84, a time which qualifies for the 2027 European U23 Championships, where he is eligible to compete as a refugee athlete. In July 2026, he won over 5000 metres at the Morton Games in Dublin, running a personal best 13:15.06 to win ahead of Irish pair Darragh McElhinney and Nick Griggs. Representing the Athlete Refugee Team, he finished 26th in 13:36 in the 5k race at the 2026 World Athletics Road Running Championships on 19 September, in Copenhagen.
