= Keelan Kilrehill =

Irish long-distance runner (born 2000)

Personal information
- Nationality: Irish
- Born: 29 September 2000 (age 26)
- Education: University College Dublin

Sport
- Country: Ireland
- Sport: Athletics
- Event: Long-distance running
Medal record
Men's athletics
Representing Ireland
European Cross Country Championships
Gold medal – first place	2021 Dublin	U23 team
Bronze medal – third place	2022 Turin	U23 Team

Keelan Kilrehill (born 29 September 2000) is an Irish long distance runner. In 2024, he became the Irish National Cross Country champion.

== Early life ==
He is from Dromore West in County Sligo. He was a keen Gaelic footballer, hurler and soccer player in his youth before focusing on running. In 2015, he suffered severe injuries as a 14 year old following a bicycle crash that gave him three broken vertebrae in his back and a fracture in his C1 vertebra in his neck which required surgery to place a long bar into his back, with six screws drilled into his spine to hold it in place.

== Career ==
He runs for Moy Valley Athletics Club. In 2021, he finished sixth in the U23 individual race and won gold in the U23 team race at the 2021 European Cross Country Championships in Dublin. The following year, at the 2022 European Cross Country Championships in Turin, he finished ninth in the U-23 race and was part of the Irish U23 team that won bronze.

Kilrehill came fourth in the 2023 Irish National Cross Country Championships. He was then part of the Irish Senior Men's team who finished fourth at the 2023 European Cross Country Championships. In March 2024, he was selected to compete at the World Cross Country Championships in Belgrade.

In July 2024, he broke the County Sligo record for the 5000 metres whilst competing at The Morton Games, running a personal best time of 13.53.03. In November 2024, he won the Irish National Cross Country Championship in Irvinestown, Fermanagh.

== Personal life ==
He graduated from Dublin City University with a degree in economics, politics and law.
