= Aoife Cooke =

Irish long-distance runner

Personal information
- Nationality: Irish
- Born: 13 September 1986 (age 40) Cork, Ireland

Sport
- Sport: Track and Field
- Event: Marathon

Aoife Cooke (born 13 September 1986) is an Irish national champion long-distance runner. She competed in the marathon at the 2020 Olympic Games.

== Early and personal life ==
She is from Ballincollig in County Cork. She joined an athletics club at 11 years-of-age, but and also played soccer and camogie when she was growing-up. As a 17-year-old she took up a college scholarship in the United States at Arkansas Tech University. She enrolled in 2008 at University College Cork and later worked as a full-time personal trainer. She became based in Tower, County Cork. She is a lesbian and came out as gay when she was 18 years-old. In 2020, she gave a public webinar, in association with Athletics Ireland and Sporting Pride entitled Standing Proud, My Life as an Elite LGBTQ+ Marathon Runner.

== Career ==
Whilst in her second year in the American college system she won conference and regional cross-country titles and finished ninth at the Division II national championships. However, her momentum was halted by a pelvic stress fracture the following year before having a run of injuries and stress fractures that led to a diagnosis of low bone density which she treats with nutrition.

She won the 2019 Dublin Marathon in a time of 2:32:34, a fourteen-minute personal best. For her efforts, she also won the national title that came with being the top Irish woman at the event. She won the Cheshire Elite Marathon women's race on 25 April 2021, her first marathon since the Dublin marathon 18 months previously. In doing so, she improved her personal best by almost four minutes to 2:28:36, becoming only the fifth Irish woman to break 2:30. With the time, she qualified for the marathon race at the upcoming Olympic Games. The time also moved he from 55th to fifth on the all-time Irish list. Competing at the delayed 2020 Olympic Games, held in Tokyo, Japan in 2021, Cooke struggled in the hot and humid conditions and did not finish the marathon.

In June 2024, she won the Cork City marathon.
