= Cristina Ruiz Sandoval =

Mexican politician

Cristina Ruíz Sandoval
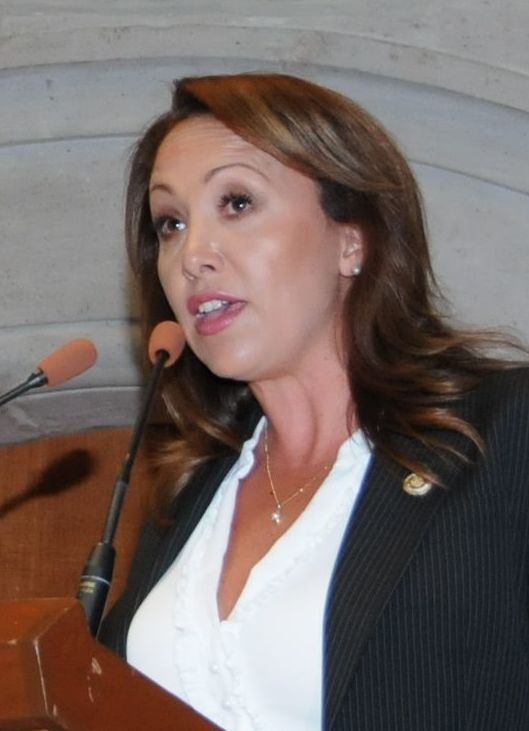
- Born: 23 October 1972 (age 53); State of Mexico, Mexico
- Occupation: Politician
- Political party: PRI

Cristina Ruiz Sandoval (born 23 October 1972) is a Mexican politician affiliated with the Institutional Revolutionary Party (PRI).

Her first elected office was a seat in the Congress of the State of Mexico for the 2009–12 term. In the 2012 general election she was subsequently elected to the Chamber of Deputies to represent the State of Mexico's 21st district during the 62nd session of Congress.

She was elected for a further term in the Chamber of Deputies in the 2021 mid-terms as a plurinominal deputy and, in the 2024 general election, she was elected to the Senate from the PRI's national list.
