= Florian Bremm =

German long-distance runner

Personal information
- Born: 14 August 2000 (age 25)

Sport
- Sport: Athletics
- Events: Long distance running, Cross country running

Achievements and titles
- Personal bests: 3000 m: 7:39.01 (2025); 5000 m: 12:56.80 (2026)
Medal record
Men's athletics
Representing Germany
European Championships
Silver medal – second place	2026 Birmingham	5000 m

Florian Bremm (born 14 August 2000) is a German long-distance runner. He won the silver medal at the 2026 European Athletics Championships over 5000 metres having won the German Athletics Championships over 5000 metres in 2023 and 2024.

== Biography ==
From Colmberg in the district of Ansbach in Bavaria, Bremm is a member of TV 1862 Leutershausen. He qualified for the 2019 European Cross Country Championships in the under-20 category.

Bremm won the 2023 German Athletics Championships title over 5000 metres in Kassel, in a time of 13:35.65. He then also won the German Indoor Athletics Championships title over 3000 metres in February 2024. That summer, he competed for Germany at the 2024 European Athletics Championships in Rome, Italy, over 5000 metres in June 2024. He retained his German Athletics Championships title over 5000 metres later that month. He concluded his season with a victory over 3000 metres at the Gyulai István Memorial in Hungary.

Competing at the 2025 World Athletics Indoor Tour meeting in Luxembourg in January 2025, he took the meeting record and set a new personal best over 3000 metres with a run of 7:39.01. He placed seventh in the final of the 3000 metres at the 2025 European Athletics Indoor Championships in Apeldoorn, Netherlands, in March. In June 2025, he recorded a win in Bergen over home favourite Narve Gilje Nordås over 3000 m. He was runner-up over 5000 metres at the German Athletics Championships in August 2025 in Dresden, running 13:50.42. In September 2025, he competed for Germany over 5000 metres at the 2025 World Championships in Tokyo, Japan, without advancing to the final.

On 10 August 2026, Bremm won the silver medal at the 2026 European Athletics Championships in Birmingham, England, in the 5000 metres. Having led on the last lap, he was only overtaken on the home straight by a surge from Jakob Ingebrigtsen who won his fourth consecutive European title.

== Personal life ==
Alongside fellow international athlete Niklas Buchholz, he is a member of a Erlangen-based running group who also post comedic athletics themed videos on YouTube under the name "Running Gags".
