= Ramazan Baştuğ =

Turkish long-distance runner (born 2000)

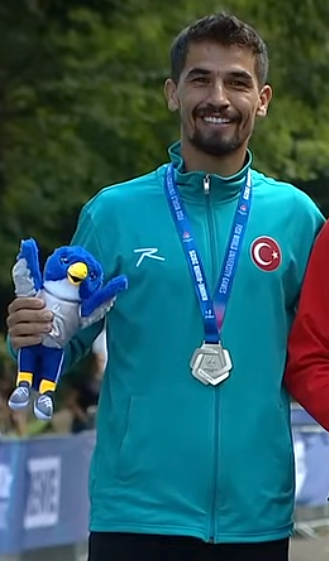
- At the 2025 Summer World University Games

Personal information
- Nationality: Turkish
- Born: 1 December 2000 (age 25) Turkey
- Home town: Turkey
- Education: Aksaray University

Sport
- Country: Turkey
- Sport: Long-distance running
- Events: 5000 m, 10,000 m, half marathon, cross country running
- Team: Enka SK
Medal record
Men's Athletics
Representing Turkey
Balkan Championships
Silver medal – second place	2023 Kraljevo	5000 m
FISU World University Games
Silver medal – second place	2025 Bochum	Half marathon Ind.
Silver medal – second place	2025 Bochum	Half marathon Team
Mediterranean Games
Bronze medal – third place	2026 Taranto	Half marathon
Mediterranean U23 Championships
Silver medal – second place	2022 Pescara	5000 m

Ramazan Baştuğ (born 1 December 2000) is a Turkish long-distance runner who competes in the 5000 m, 10,000 m, the half marathon and cross-country running events.

== Personal life ==
Ramazan Baştuğ was born on 1 December 2000.

== Sport career ==
Baştuğ is a member of Enka SK in Istanbul.

At the 2022 Mediterranean Athletics U23 Championships held in Pescara, Italy, he took the silver medal in the 5000 m event with 14:29.27.

In 2023, he became silver medalist in the 5000 m event at the 2023 Balkan Athletics Championships in Kraljevo, Serbia.

Baştuğ competed at the 2025 Summer World University Games in Bochum, Germany, and won the silver medal in the half marathon event with 1:02.35. He received another silver medal in the half marathon team event with teammates Ayetullah Aslanhan, Azat Demirtaş and Ömer Amaçtan.
