= Miguel Márquez (sculptor) =

Spanish sculptor and footballer (1911–1996)

Personal information
- Full name: Miguel Márquez Peñate
- Date of birth: 26 December 1911
- Place of birth: Las Palmas, Canary Islands, Spain
- Date of death: 28 March 1996 (aged 84)
- Place of death: Santa Cruz de Tenerife, Spain
- Position: Forward

Senior career*
Years	Team	Apps	(Gls)
?–1932	Athletic de Palma		
1932–1934	Espanyol		
1934–1936	Manresa		
- * Club domestic league appearances and goals

Miguel Márquez Peñate (26 December 1911 – 28 March 1996) was a Spanish sculptor, professor, and footballer who played as a forward for Espanyol in the early 1930s.

== Early life and education ==
Born on 26 December 1911 in the Canary Islands town of Las Palmas, Márquez's older brother, the sculptor and furniture designer Juan Márquez, enlisted the 11-year-old Miguel in the Luján Pérez School, where he studied with Juan Carló Medina and Eduardo Gregorio, participating in the school's first historical exhibition in 1929.

== Playing career ==
Márquez began his football career at his hometown club Athletic de Palma, where he quickly stood out from the rest, so in 1932, he was signed by Espanyol, with whom he played for two seasons, scoring a total of 5 goals in 9 matches, including 1 goal in 3 La Liga matches and 4 goals in 6 Catalan championship matches. He then joined Manresa, but his career was cut short by the outbreak of the Spanish Civil War in 1936.

== Professional career ==
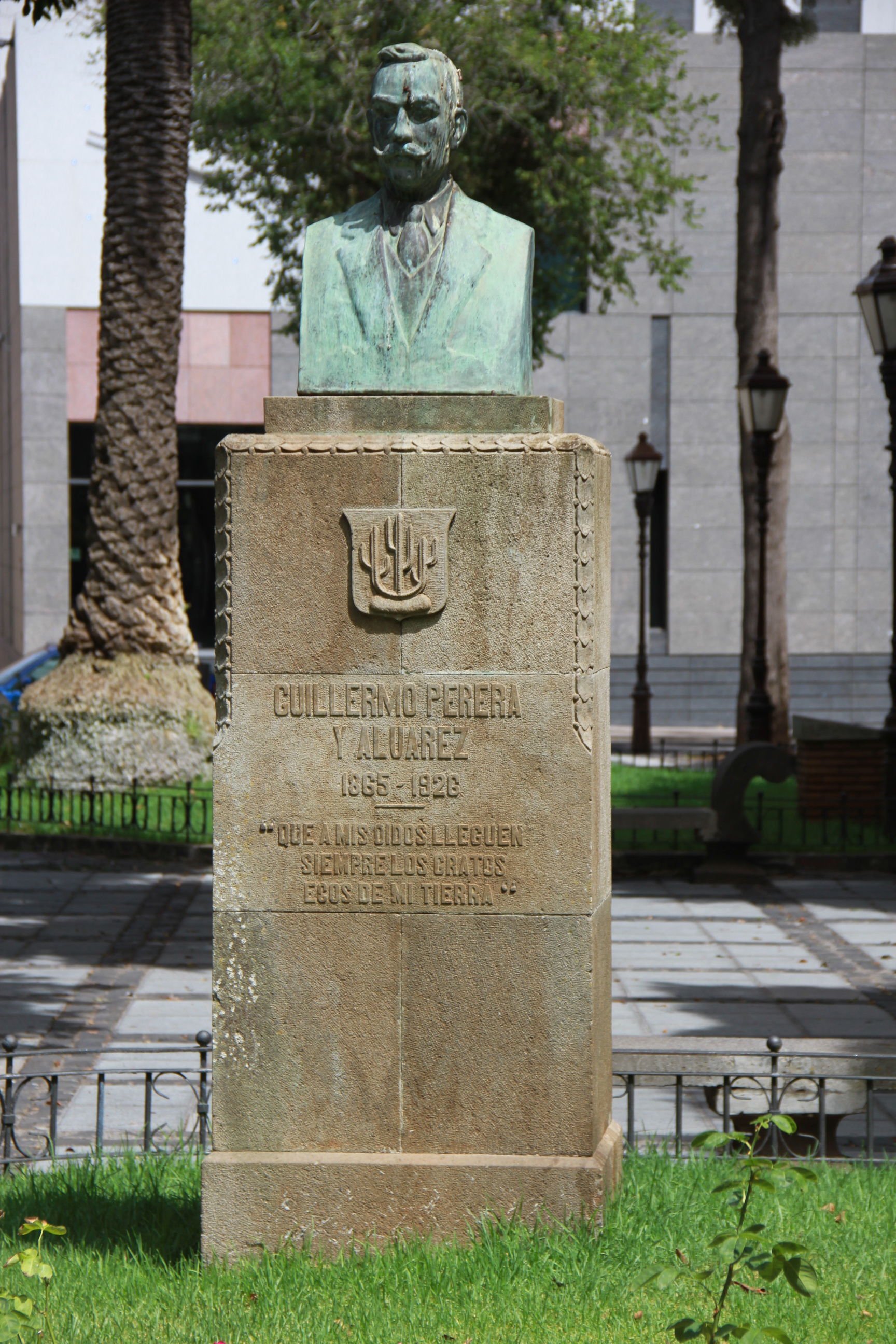
The Bust of Guillermo Perera y Álvarez, made by Miguel Márquez.

Márquez took advantage of his stint in the Catalan capital to continue his artistic training, participating in several group exhibitions, where he exchanged ideas with other sculptors. He later worked at the Sant Jordi School of Fine Arts in Barcelona, where he learned about different stone materials and carved his first sculptures. Having settled in Santa Cruz de Tenerife in 1939, he organized a solo exhibition of sculptures at the local Círculo de Bellas Artes in 1941, after which he was invited to take up the chair of Wood Carving and Modeling at the local Arts and Crafts School, a position that he held for 38 years, from 1943 until his retirement in 1981, aged 70. His studies at the Luján Pérez School, however, lacked academic validity, so he had to renew them in the early 1960s, doing so in Seville, where he obtained the official qualification that allowed him to continue working in Tenerife, where he taught not only future artists, but also secondary school teachers.

His personal work was mainly focused on preparing exhibitions and commissions, such as the bust of Guillermo Perera y Álvarez in 1952. His work is noted for his charm and realism, and has been described by his biographer Teo Mesa, as seeking "its typology around man as the epicenter of the earth, within a figurative style based on his innate emotionality". Another leading scholar of his work, Carlos Pérez Reyes, divided his work into three periods: Formation in the late 1920s, Equilibrium (1940–57), and Formal Refinement, which lasted from 1958 to 1975. On 26 December 1986, the 75-year-old Márquez was elected as a Full Academician of the RACBA, but his deteriorating health prevented him from performing his solemn induction ceremony.

== Death ==
After marrying Dolores Zárate Méndez, a Burgos native who had settled in Barcelona, Márquez returned to the Canary Islands in 1939, settling in Tenerife, where he died on 28 March 1996, at the age of 84. His son José Miguel Márquez Zárate also had a distinguished professional career in architecture.
