= James West (runner) =

British athlete

Personal information
- Nationality: British (English)
- Born: 30 January 1996 (age 30)

Sport
- Sport: Athletics
- Events: 3000m, 5000m
- Club: Tonbridge AC

Achievements and titles
- Personal bests: Outdoor; 3000m: 7:43.79 (Bromley, 2020); 5000m: 13:09.07 (Brussels, 2024)
Medal record
British Athletics Championships
Gold medal – first place	2023 Manchester	5000m
Gold medal – first place	2024 Manchester	5000m
British Athletics Indoor Championships
Gold medal – first place	2023 Birmingham	3000m
Gold medal – first place	2024 Birmingham	3000m

James West (born 30 January 1996) is a British track and field athlete. He is a multiple-time British champion.

== Biography ==
From Thanet, Kent, he is member of Tonbridge Athletics Club. He attended Loughborough University and the University of Oregon, where he competed for the Oregon Ducks track and field team.

In 2022 West finished as runner-up to Marc Scott in the 5000m at the British national championships, running a 13.44.47 new personal best.

West won the 3000m national title in February 2023. He was selected for the Great Britain squad for the 2023 European Indoor Athletics Championships held at the Ataköy Athletics Arena in Istanbul. He finished eighth in Istanbul, with a time of 7:48.22s.

In July 2023, he won the British 5000m title, at the British National Championships in Manchester in a time of 13:42.03.

On 18 February 2024, he retained his British indoor title over 3000 metres in Birmingham.

In May 2024, he lowered his 5000m personal best to 13:09.07 in Brussels. That month, he was selected to run the 5000 metres for Britain at the 2024 European Athletics Championships in Rome. In June 2024, he won the 5000m at the 2024 British Athletics Championships in Manchester. He ran 4:56.23 for the 2000 metres at the Boris Hanžeković Memorial in Croatia in September to go fifth on the UK 2000m all-time list. It was the fastest time by a British man since 1988.

He finished runner-up over 3000 metres at the 2025 British Indoor Athletics Championships. He was selected for the British team for the 2025 European Athletics Indoor Championships in Apeldoorn.

On 21 June 2026, West placed third over 5000 metres at the 2026 UK Athletics Championships. In August, he competed at the 2026 European Athletics Championships in Birmingham, England, in the 5000 metres, placing twelfth overall.
