= Adela Paulina Baltoi =

Romanian long-distance runner (born 1992)

Personal information
- Born: 19 September 1992 (age 33)

Sport
- Country: Romania
- Sport: Long-distance running

Adela Paulina Baltoi (born 19 September 1992) is a Romanian long-distance runner. In 2020, she competed in the women's half marathon at the 2020 World Athletics Half Marathon Championships held in Gdynia, Poland.
