= Hamish Armitt =

Scottish cyclist (born 2002)

Personal information
- Born: 24 June 2002 (age 24) Glasgow, Scotland

Cycling career
- Sport: Cycling
- Current team: Team Novo Nordisk
- Discipline: Road
- Role: Rider

Amateur team
- 2024: Project1

Professional team
- 2025–: Team Novo Nordisk

Hamish Armitt (born 24 June 2002) is a Scottish cyclist, who currently rides for UCI ProTeam Team Novo Nordisk.

== Early and personal life ==
He is from Glasgow, Scotland. He was diagnosed with type 1 diabetes aged 15 years-old. He studied sports marketing at the University of Stirling.

== Athletics ==
Hamish Armitt
Sport
- Sport: Athletics
- Event: 5000m

Achievements and titles
- Personal bests: 3000m: 8:29.39 (Glasgow, 2019); Road: 5km: 14:00 (Armagh, 2020)
Medal record
Men's athletics
Representing Great Britain
European Cross Country Championships
Gold medal – first place	2021 Dublin	U20 race

He was one of Britain’s best junior runners, his time of 14 minutes for the 5 km was top five all-time for his age group, and in 2025 still ranked as the sixth-fastest by a UK under-20 athlete.

He had a top-ten finish in the individual U20 race was a gold medalist in the team U20 race at the 2021 European Cross Country Championships, as part of the British team including Will Barnicoat in Dublin.

However, the high-impact of running led to stress fractures in his feet and hips and he stepped away from the sport in favour of cycling.

== Cycling ==
He signed his maiden professional contract within a year of his first senior race. He signed for Project1 for 2024, and raced in the United Kingdom and on the continent. He then signed for UCI ProTeam Team Novo Nordisk for the 2025 season.
