= Miguel Márquez (poet) =

Venezuelan writer, poet and editor

- Born: 1955 (age 70–71); Caracas, Venezuela
- Citizenship: Venezuelan
- Occupations: Writer; Newspaper editor; Poet
- Known for: Co-founder of Grupo Tráfico

Miguel Márquez (born 1955) was a Venezuelan writer, poet, and editor.

== Early life and education ==
Born in the Venezuelan capital of Caracas in 1955, Márquez got a degree in Philosophy from the Andrés Bello Catholic University (UCAB).

== Career ==
Márquez dedicated most of his life to books, either as an author, researcher, editor, and bookstore manager. He served as a director of both the Literature of the National Council of Culture of Venezuela (CONAC) and the Kuai-Mare Foundation's network of bookstores. Márquez has been involved with other bookstores, including the one at the University of the Andes, and the Ateneo de Caracas bookstore, where he worked as a collaborator. He also participated in the Hojas de Calicanto workshop, worked as a researcher at the Rómulo Gallegos Center for Latin American Studies (CELARG), and even collaborated with the National Library of Venezuela.

In 1981, Márquez, together with other poets of the literary Calicanto workshop, co-founded the Grupo Tráfico. The following year, in 1982, he received the Fernando Paz Castillo Award for his work Cosas por decir ("Things to Say"). He has been included in various anthologies, including the Anthology of Venezuelan Poetry, which was written by Rafael Arraiz Lucca.

He also served as the president of the state-owned publishing house El Perro y la Rana, a position that he held until 31 December 2009, when he resigned, citing personal reasons. A few years later, he helped organize the inaugural edition of the World Poetry Festival of Venezuela, which was held in March 2014. According to him, the World Poetry Festival should be looked at merely "as one more activity in the broader policy of inclusion and democratization of books and reading; that is, it is one more element within a whole that emerged alongside the Declaration of Venezuela as a country free of illiteracy".

== Works ==
- Cosas por decir (1982)
- Soneto al aire libre (1986)
- Poemas de Berna (1992)
- La casa, el paso (1991)
- A salvo en la penumbra (1999)
- Linaje de ofrenda (2004)

== Bibliography ==
- Miranda, Julio (2001). Antología histórica de la poesía venezolana del siglo XX, 1907-1996 [Historical anthology of 20th-century Venezuelan poetry, 1907-1996] (in Spanish). San Juan: Editorial de la Universidad de Puerto Rico. ISBN 978-0-847-70121-6.
