= Bitlis Eren University =

Public university in Bitlis, Turkey

- Established: 2007
- Location: Rahva Yerleşkesi Beş Minare Mah. Ahmet Eren Bulvarı 13100, Bitlis, Turkey; 38.4371°N 42.1387°E
- Campus: Rahva Campus
- Website: Official website

Bitlis Eren University (BEU) (Turkish: Bitlis Eren Üniversitesi) is a university located in Bitlis, Turkey. It was established in 2007. The university was named after Eren Holding, the company which sponsored and constructed the university infrastructure.

== Affiliations ==
The university is a member of the Caucasus University Association.
