= Darragh McElhinney =

Irish long-distance runner (born 2000)

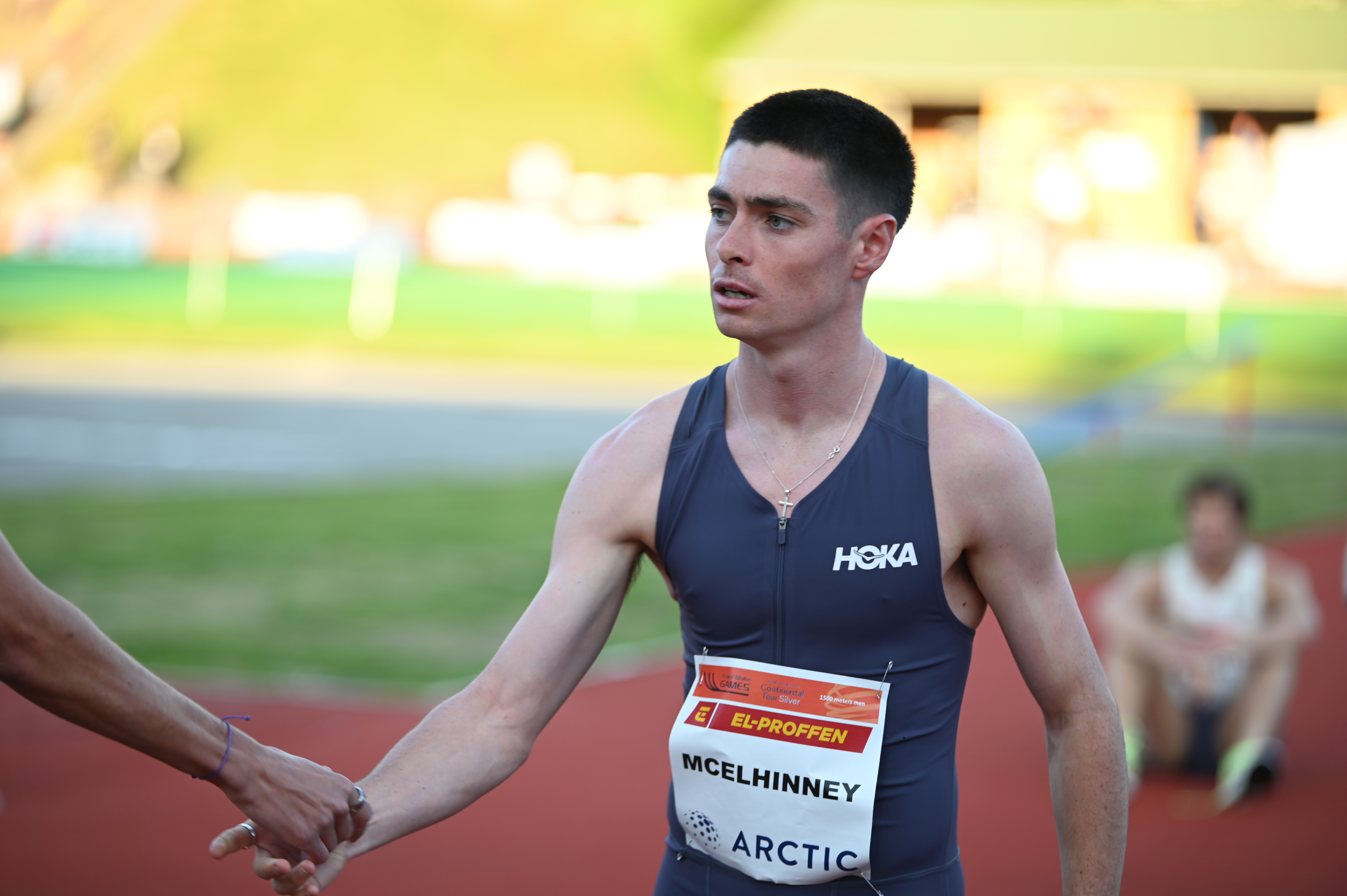
- Darragh McElhinney in 2026

Personal information
- Nationality: Irish
- Born: 9 November 2000 (age 25)
- Education: University College Dublin

Sport
- Country: Ireland
- Sport: Athletics
- Events: Middle-, long-distance running

Achievements and titles
- Personal bests: 1500m: 3:37.38 (Dublin, 2025); Mile: 3:51.99 (Dublin, 2025); 3000m: 7:35.16 (Budapest, 2025); 5000m: 13:02.06 (Oordegem, 2025)
Medal record
Men's athletics
Representing Ireland
European Cross Country Championships
Gold medal – first place	2021 Dublin	U23 team
Silver medal – second place	2021 Dublin	U23 race
Bronze medal – third place	2022 Turin	U23 Team
European U20 Championships
Bronze medal – third place	2019 Borås	5000 m

Darragh McElhinney (born 9 November 2000) is an Irish middle and long distance runner. He is a multiple-time national champion.

== Early life ==
From County Cork, he attended Coláiste Pobail Bheanntraí. He runs for Bantry Athletics Club. His father Tony is involved with Glengarriff GAA, and Darragh played as a youngster helping Beara win the U16 county Premier 1 football championship final, but stopped in 2016 to concentrate on athletics. He won junior Irish 1500m, U16 mile, and intermediate 1500m titles. He was the first Irish teenager to ever run under 14 minutes for the 5000m.

== Career ==
In 2017, aged 16 years-old he broke John Treacy's outdoor youth 3000 metres record that had stood since 1974, running 8:18.18.

He set a new personal best time of 14:06.05 to win bronze in the 5000 metres at the 2019 European Athletics U20 Championships in Borås, Sweden.

He won his first senior national title in 2020 in the 5000m. On July 28, 2021, he ran 3:58.20 at a one-mile race in London, to break the four-minute barrier for the first time. It was also an Irish U23 record. In 2021, McElhinney, was second in the 2021 European Cross Country Championships under-23 race staged at Abbotstown, also winning the U23 team gold with Ireland.

In March 2022, he made his senior international debut at the 2022 World Athletics Indoor Championships in Belgrade. That month he won the national indoor 3000m title, and set a new national U23 1500m indoor record time of 3:39.63. In May 2022, he set a personal best and new national U23 record in the 5000m, when he ran 3:17.17 in Belgium. That year, he also won the national title in the 5000m outdoors. He broke the national U23 3000m record twice, when he ran 7:44.01 in Cork in July and 7:42.86 in Italy in August. That month he competed at the 2022 European Athletics Championships in the 5000 metres in Munich, and finished 16th in the final. He won the Irish National Cross Country Championships in Donegal in November 2022.

In March 2023, he finished fourth at the 3000 metres at the 2023 European Athletics Indoor Championships in Istanbul.

He set a personal best time of 7:39.92 over 3000 metres in Metz, France in February 2024. A few days later, he finished third in the 3000 metres at the 2024 Copernicus Cup in Poland.

In June 2024, he finished third in the 1500 metres race at the Irish Championshios in Dublin.

In May 2025, McElhinney won the men's 1500m in 3:37.86, 0.14 outside of his personal best, at the Belfast Milers Meet in Northern Ireland. He ran a 5000-metre personal best of 13:02.06 in Oordegem, Belgium in August 2025. In September 2025, he competed over 5000 metres at the 2025 World Championships in Tokyo, Japan, without advancing to the final.

On 1 March 2026, he was runner-up to Nick Griggs in the 3000 metres in 8:15.08 at the Irish Indoor Athletics Championships having been involved in a racing incident with Andrew Coscoran from which Coscoran fell, with 100 metres to go. In May, he won the 1500 metres at the Trond Mohn Games in Bergen, running 3:38.10. In July 2026, he placed second over 5000 metres at the Morton Games in Dublin, running 13:15.90 to finish behind Aron Gebremariam. On 26 July, he won the national title in the 5000 metres at the 2026 Irish Championships, finishing ahead of training partner Jack O'Leary. In August, he competed at the 2026 European Athletics Championships in Birmingham, England, in the 5000 metres. Competing in the 5k at the 2026 World Athletics Road Running Championships on 19 September, McElhinney ran an Irish record of 13:22 to finish in 16th place.

== Personal life ==
He studied for a history and politics degree at University College Dublin. He was one of the students who feature in the RTÉ One documentary television series My Uni Life, which charts a year in the life of Ireland's universities.
