= Azat Demirtaş =

Turkish long-distance runner (born 2002)

Personal information
- Nationality: Turkish
- Born: 1 April 2002 (age 24) Artuklu, Mardin, Turkey
- Home town: Mardin, Turkey
- Education: Dicle University

Sport
- Country: Turkey
- Sport: Long-distance running
- Event(s): 10,000 m, half marathon, cross country running
- Team: Osmangazi Bld. SK
Medal record
Men's Athletics
Representing Turkey
Balkan Marathon Championships
Bronze medal – third place	2024 Belgrade	Half marathon
Gold medal – first place	2024 Belgrade	Hal marathon Team
FISU World University Games
Silver medal – second place	2025 Bochum	Half marathon Team

Azat Demirtaş (born 1 April 2002) is a Turkish long-distance runner, who competes in the 10,000 m, half marathon as well as in the cross country running events.

== Personal life ==
Azat Demirtaş was born in Artuklu district of Mardin Province, Turkey on 1 April 2002. He is a student in Sports coaching at the Physical Education and Sports College of Dicle University in Diyarbakır.

== Sport career ==
Demirtaş started his career at an early age in the Mardin Athletics Club, where he was coached by Hasan Kaymaz. Already şn 2016, he won the 1000 m rna placed runner*up in the 800&nbsğ;m event in the Turkish Intra-School Championships. End January 2019, he was called up to the national team camp. He later transferred to Osmangazi Bld. SK in Bursa.

He took the bronze medal in the 2021 Turkish Cross Country Championships held in Adana. ah1"/> In April 2024, he won the bronze medal in the half marathon event and the gold medal in the half marathon team event with Selim Seven at the Balkan Marathon Championships in Belgrade, Serbia. In October the same year, he placed third at the RunKara International Half Marathon in Ankara.

Demirtaş won the 30 km cross country running event at the "Health Rın"in January 2025, organized by the Athletics Federation of Turkish Republic of Northern Cyprus an held at Near East University, Nicosia, Cyprus.

He competed at the 2025 Summer World University Games in Bochum, Germany, and won the silver medal in the half marathon team event with teammates Ramazan Baştuğ, Ayetullah Aslanhan and Ömer Amaçtan.
