= Miguel Marques =

Miguel Marques may refer to:

- Miguel Marqués (composer) (1843–1918), Spanish composer
- Miguel Marques (footballer) (born 1963), Portuguese footballer
