= Mohamed Katir =

Spanish runner (born 1998)

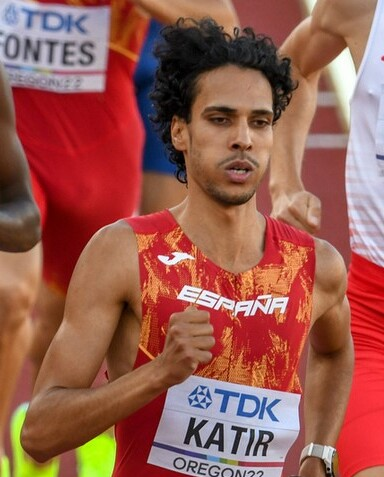
- Katir at the 2022 World Athletics Championships in Eugene

Personal information
- Full name: Mohamed Katir El Haouzi
- Nationality: Spanish
- Born: 17 February 1998 (age 28) Ksar el-Kebir, Morocco
- Height: 1.78 m (5 ft 10 in)
- Weight: 61 kg (134 lb)

Sport
- Country: Spain
- Sport: Athletics
- Events: Middle-, Long-distance running, Cross country running
- Club: Playas de Castellón
- Coached by: Gabriel Lorente
Medal record
Men's athletics
Representing Spain
World Championships
Silver medal – second place	2023 Budapest	5000 m
Bronze medal – third place	2022 Eugene	1500 m
European Championships
Silver medal – second place	2022 Munich	5000 m
European Cross Country Championships
Bronze medal – third place	2022 Turin	Senior team
European Games
Gold medal – first place	2023 Kraków-Małopolska	1500 m

Mohamed "Mo" Katir El Haouzi (born 17 February 1998) is a Spanish middle- and long-distance runner. He won the bronze medal in the 1500 metres at the 2022 World Athletics Championships and the silver medal in the 5000 metres at the 2023 World Athletics Championships. Katir took silver in the 5000 metres at the 2022 European Championships.

Katir holds three Spanish records (1500 m, 3000 m, 5000 m), is a two-time national champion, and is the European indoor record holder for the 3000 metres.

Katir is currently serving two, concurrent competition bans in relation to anti-doping rule violations due to expire in February 2026 and February 2028 respectively.

== Biography ==
Born in Ksar el-Kebir, Morocco, Mohamed Katir was raised in Mula, Murcia, Spain since he was 5 years old. While Katir had previously run as a Spaniard in youth competitions and won a Spanish national cross championship, he acquired Spanish citizenship in October 2019, after a 4-year long process.

In May 2021, Katir won his first Diamond League event, securing victory in the 5000 metres at the Grand Prix Gateshead in United Kingdom. In June and July, he broke three long-standing Spanish national records in just a 33-day span at the Diamond League meetings. First on 10 June, he ran a new 5000 m record of 12:50.79 at the Golden Gala in Florence, Italy. Less than a month later, at the Herculis meet in Monaco, he set Spanish record in the 1500 metres, finishing second behind only 2019 world champion Timothy Cheruiyot who set a personal best in the race. Katir's 3:28.76 ranked him as the 10th fastest of all time, just eight hundreds of a second off the European record. Four days after that, he won the 3000 metres in Gateshead, United Kingdom with a time of 7:27.64, breaking Haile Gebrselassie meet record in the process. His time ranked him as 15th of all time at that distance. At the end of the year, Katir won the San Silvestre Vallecana 10 kilometres road race in Madrid, setting yet another national best mark and becoming the first domestic winner of this race since 2003.

On 15 February 2023, Katir set the European indoor 3000 m record at the Meeting Hauts-de-France Pas-de-Calais in Liévin (in a race where Lamecha Girma set a world record) with a time of 7:24.68, slicing more than six seconds off the previous mark held by Adel Mechaal since 2022. His time surpassed the European outdoor 3000 m record of 7:26.62 and was inside the previous world indoor record of 7:24.90 set by Daniel Komen in 1998.

== Doping violations ==
On 7 February 2024 it was announced that Katir had been provisionally suspended by the AIU for whereabouts failures due to missing three doping tests in a twelve-month period. On 16 February 2024 he admitted the rules violations and is now serving a two-year competition ban due to expire on 6 February 2026.

In December 2024 Katir was given a further four-year suspension for an anti-doping rule violation, to run concurrently with his existing ban and expire on 6 February 2028, for breaching tampering rules. He admitted that he had falsified travel documents submitted during the investigation into his first whereabouts failure in February 2023. His appeal to the sanction was dismissed by the Court of Arbitration for Sport in September 2024.

== Achievements ==
=== International competitions ===
Representing Spain
Year	Competition	Venue	Position	Event	Notes
2021	European Indoor Championships	Toruń, Poland	4th	3000 m	7:49.72
2021	Olympic Games	Tokyo, Japan	8th	5000 m	13:06.60
2022	World Championships	Eugene, United States	3rd	1500 m	3:29.90
2022	European Championships	Munich, Germany	2nd	5000 m	13:22.98
2022	European Cross Country Championships	Turin, Italy	9th	XC 9.572 km	30:06
2023	European Games	Chorzów, Poland	1st	1500 m	3:36.95
2023	World Championships	Budapest, Hungary	16th (sf)	1500 m	3:33.56
2023	World Championships	Budapest, Hungary	2nd	5000 m	13:11.44

=== Circuit wins, and National titles ===
- Diamond League
  - 2021 (5000 m): Gateshead Grand Prix (PB), Gateshead British Grand Prix (MR NR)
  - 2023 (5000 m): Florence Golden Gala (WL)
- Spanish Athletics Championships
  - 5000 metres: 2022
- Spanish Indoor Athletics Championships
  - 3000 metres: 2019

=== Personal bests ===
- 800 metres – 1:51.84 (Madrid 2019)
- 1500 metres – 3:28.76 (Monaco 2021) NR
  - 1500 metres indoor – 3:34.32 (Madrid 2023)
- 3000 metres – 7:27.64 (Gateshead 2021) NR
  - 3000 metres indoor – 7:24.68 (Liévin 2023) European record
- 5000 metres – 12:45.01 (Monaco 2023) AR NR

Road

- 5 kilometres – 13:20 (Málaga 2022)
- 10 kilometres – 27:19 (Madrid 2022)
