= Sezgin Ataç =

Turkish long-distance runner

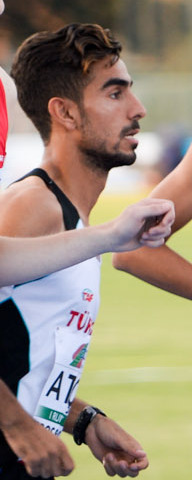

Personal information
- Born: 21 March 1998 (age 28) Varto, Muş

Sport
- Country: Turkey
- Sport: Athletics
- Event: Long-distance running
Medal record
Men's long-distance running
Representing Turkey
Balkan Athletics Championships
Bronze medal – third place	2018 Stara Zagora	5000 m
Summer World University Games
Gold medal – first place	2021 Chengdu	Half marathon
Gold medal – first place	2021 Chengdu	Half marathon team
Silver medal – second place	2021 Chengdu	10,000 m

Sezgin Ataç (born 21 March 1998) is a Turkish long-distance runner. He competed in the men's race at the 2020 World Athletics Half Marathon Championships held in Gdynia, Poland.

In 2019, he competed in the men's event at the 2019 European 10,000m Cup held in London, United Kingdom. In the same year, he finished in 17th place in the men's 10,000 metres event at the 2019 European Athletics U23 Championships held in Gävle, Sweden.
