= Elisa Palmero =

Italian athlete (born 1999)

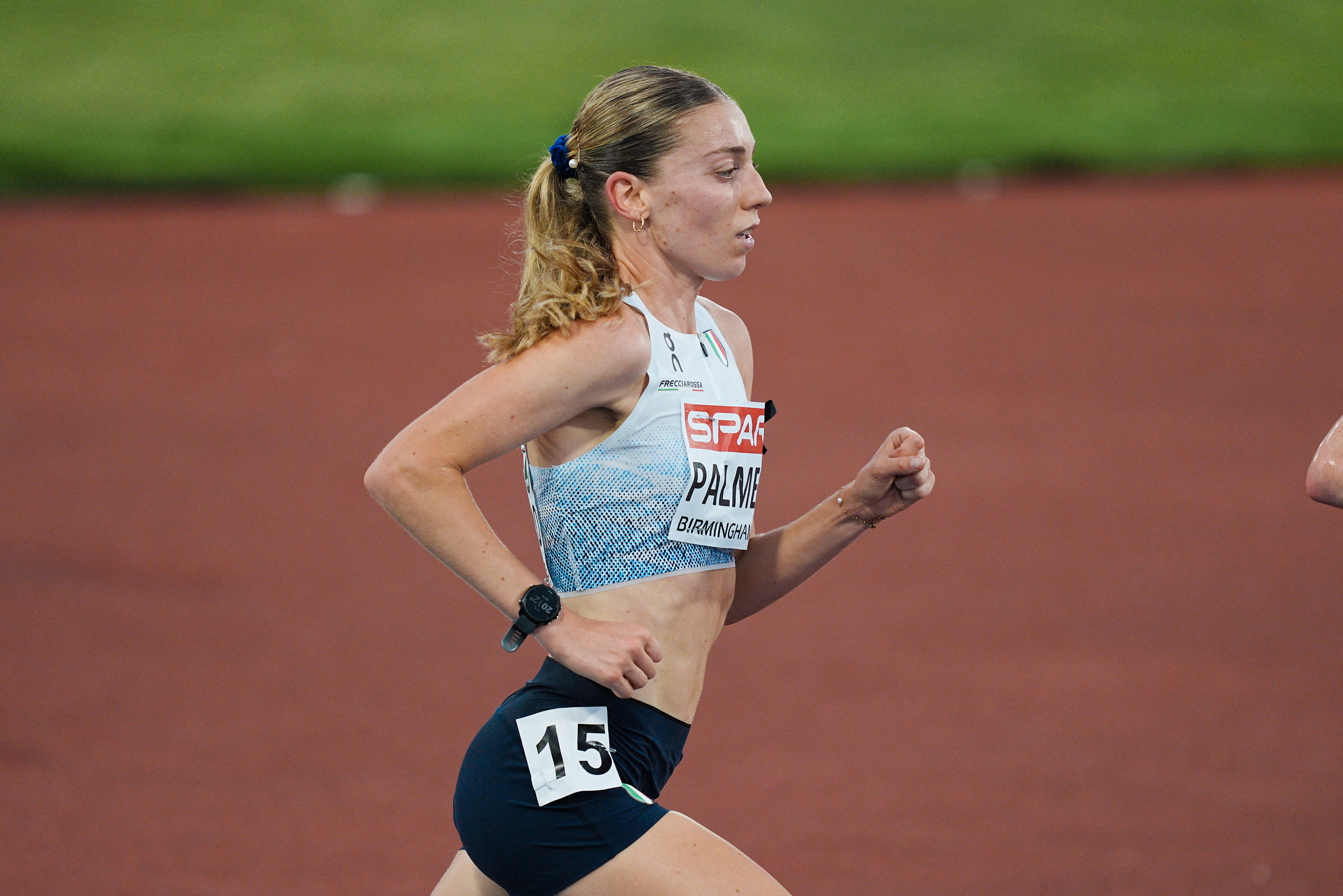

Personal information
- Born: 10 July 1999 (age 27)

Sport
- Sport: Athletics
- Event: Long distance running

Achievements and titles
- Personal bests: 10000m: 31:18.03 (Birmingham, 2025)
Medal record
Women's athletics
Representing Italy
European 10,000m Cup
Gold medal – first place	2026 La Spezia	Team race
Bronze medal – third place	2026 La Spezia	10,000 m
European Cross Country Championships
Gold medal – first place	2024 Antalya	Team race

Elisa Palmero (born 10 July 1999) is an Italian long distance runner. She won gold medals as a member of the Italian women’s team at the 2024 European Cross Country Championships and the 2025 European Running Championships.

== Early life ==
From Turin, she had a sporting background. Her father was a ski instructor, and she trained in gymnastic and classical dance before focusing on athletics. She competed as a teenager in the 1500 metres at the 2018 World Athletics U20 Championships in Tampere. That year, she was runner-up in both the 800 metres and 1500 metres at the Italian youth indoor athletics championships in Ancona.

== Career ==
=== 2023 ===
In January 2023, she won The Corrida di San Geminiano road race in her debut in the event. In February 2023, she was runner-up at the Italian indoor championships over 3000 metres in Ancona. The following month, she finished runner-up at the again Cross Country Championships. In June 2023, she competed in the 2023 European 10,000m Cup in France.

In November 2023, she won La Corsa dei Santi road race in the centre of Rome. That year, she competed at the 2023 European Cross Country Championships in Brussels.

=== 2024 ===
In June 2024, she finished sixth at the 2024 European Athletics Championships in Rome, in the Women's 10,000 metres. At the Championships, she also finished fifteenth in the Women's half marathon. She finished fifth with the Italian team at the 2024 European Half Marathon Cup.

In December 2024, she won a gold medal as part of the Italian team at the 2024 European Cross Country Championships.

=== 2025 ===
She won a gold medal in the women’s team race in the 10 km race at the 2025 European Running Championships in Belgium and placed fifth at the 2025 European 10,000m Cup in Pacé. She won over 10,000m in Birmingham in June 2025, running a time of 31:18.03. In September 2025, she competed over 10,000 metres at the 2025 World Championships in Tokyo, Japan.

=== 2026 ===
Palmero made her debut at the marathon distance, running 2:24:10 to finish fourth overall at the Seville Marathon in February 2026. In May, she won the gold medal in the team event and bronze in the individual race, running 31:59.49 to finish behind Elżbieta Glinka of Poland and Alessia Zarbo of France at the European 10,000m Cup in La Spezia. In August, she competed at the 2026 European Athletics Championships in Birmingham, England, placing fifth in the 10,000 metres.
