= 2026 European Athletics Championships – Women's 10,000 metres =

Women's 10,000 metres at the 2026 European Athletics Championships
- Venue: Alexander Stadium
- Location: Birmingham, United Kingdom
- Dates: 14 August 2026
- Competitors: 27 (target)

Medalists
gold medal	Nadia Battocletti	Italy
silver medal	Maureen Koster	Netherlands
bronze medal	Jana Van Lent	Belgium

The women's 10,000 metres at the 2026 European Athletics Championships took place at the Alexander Stadium in Birmingham, United Kingdom, on 14 August 2026.

== Background ==
Records before the 2026 European Athletics Championships
Record	Athlete (nation)	Time	Location	Date
World record	Beatrice Chebet (KEN)	28:54.14	Eugene, United States	25 May 2024
European record	Sifan Hassan (NED)	29:06.82	Hengelo, Netherlands	6 June 2021
Championship record	Paula Radcliffe (GBR)	30:01.09	Munich, Germany	6 August 2002
World leading	Janeth Nyiva Muntungi (KEN)	30:29.18	Chitose, Japan	5 July 2026
European leading	Maureen Koster (NED)	30:50.31	Ostrava, Czech Republic	15 June 2026

== Qualification ==
For the women's 10,000 metres, the qualification period was from 27 January 2025 to 26 July 2026. Athletes qualified by running the entry standard of 32:00.00 min or faster, by wildcard for the 2024 European Athletics Champion, or by their position on the World Athletics Rankings for the event. The target number was 27 athletes.

Qualification standings per 31 July 2026
QP	CP	Country	Athlete	Status	Details
1	1	Italy	Nadia Battocletti	Qualified by Wild Card	Defending European Champion
2	1	Netherlands	Maureen Koster	Qualified by Entry Standard	30:50.31 - Mestský Stadion, Ostrava (CZE) - 15 JUN 2026
3	1	Belgium	Jana Van Lent	Qualified by Entry Standard	30:51.18 - Complexe Sportif de Blocry, Louvain-La-Neuve (BEL) - 06 JUN 2026
4	2	Netherlands	Diane van Es	Qualified by Entry Standard	31:08.05 - Bislett Stadion, Oslo (NOR) - 11 JUN 2025
5	2	Italy	Elisa Palmero	Qualified by Entry Standard	31:18.03 - Birmingham University Athletics Track, Birmingham (GBR) - 14 JUN 2025
6	1	Great Britain & N.I.	Megan Keith	Qualified by Entry Standard	31:19.88 - Birmingham University Athletics Track, Birmingham (GBR) - 14 JUN 2025
7	1	Slovenia	Klara Lukan	Qualified by Entry Standard	31:25.84 - Lohrheidestadion, Wattenscheid, Bochum (GER) - 21 JUL 2025
8	1	Germany	Lisa Merkel	Qualified by Entry Standard	31:32.25 - JSerra Catholic HS, San Juan Capistrano, CA (USA) - 28 MAR 2026
9	2	Germany	Eva Dieterich	Qualified by Entry Standard	31:45.18 - Jahnkampfbahn, Hamburg (GER) - 03 MAY 2025
10	1	Poland	Elżbieta Glinka	Qualified by Entry Standard	31:45.36 - Centro Sportivo A. Montagna, La Spezia (ITA) - 23 MAY 2026
11	3	Italy	Federica Del Buono	Qualified by Entry Standard	31:46.35 - Sportcomplex De Leidse Hout, Leiden (NED) - 13 JUN 2026
12	2	Great Britain & N.I.	Izzy Fry	Qualified by Entry Standard	31:47.60 - Birmingham University Athletics Track, Birmingham (GBR) - 14 JUN 2025
13	1	France	Alessia Zarbo	Qualified by Entry Standard	31:50.62 - Stade Complexe Sportif Jean-Paul Chasseboeuf, Pacé (FRA) - 24 MAY 2025
14	1	Norway	Anna Marie Nordengen Sirevåg	Qualified by Entry Standard	31:52.53 - Herrenwaldhalle, Stadtallendorf (GER) - 06 JUN 2026
15	2	Belgium	Chloé Herbiet	Qualified by Entry Standard	31:54.06 - Stade Complexe Sportif Jean-Paul Chasseboeuf, Pacé (FRA) - 24 MAY 2025
16	2	Slovenia	Maruša Mišmaš Zrimšek	Qualified by Entry Standard	31:57.85 - Herrenwaldhalle, Stadtallendorf (GER) - 06 JUN 2026
17	1	Portugal	Mariana Machado	Qualified by Entry Standard	31:30 - Brussels-Leuven (BEL) - 13 APR 2025
18	3	Belgium	Lisa Rooms	Qualified by Entry Standard	31:34 - Schoorl (NED) - 08 FEB 2026
19	1	Finland	Ilona Mononen	Qualified by Entry Standard	31:38 - Turku (FIN) - 24 APR 2026
20	3	Netherlands	Jennifer Gulikers	Qualified by Entry Standard	32:00 - Schoorl (NED) - 08 FEB 2026
21	1	Spain	Carla Gallardo	Qualified by World Rankings	19th - 1175 points
22	2	Spain	Idaira Prieto	Qualified by World Rankings	26th - 1159 points
23	3	Great Britain & N.I.	Poppy Tank	Qualified by World Rankings	28th - 1153 points
24	2	Norway	Hanne Mjøen Maridal	Qualified by World Rankings	36th - 1134 points
25	2	Finland	Nina Chydenius	Qualified by World Rankings	38th - 1132 points
26	1	Ireland	Niamh Allen	Qualified by World Rankings	39th - 1131 points
27	2	Ireland	Fiona Everard	Qualified by World Rankings	41st - 1127 points
reserve	3	Ireland	Anika Thompson	Next best by World Rankings	69th - 1106 points

Bye to semi-finals	Reserve activated	Withdrawal / reserve unused

== Schedule ==
Date	Time	Round
14 August 2026	19:45	Final

All times are local times (UTC+1)

== Results ==
Place	Athlete	Nation	Time	Notes
1st place, gold medalist(s)	Nadia Battocletti	Italy	31:41.17	SB
2nd place, silver medalist(s)	Maureen Koster	Netherlands	31:45.76	
3rd place, bronze medalist(s)	Jana Van Lent	Belgium	31:47.81	
4	Idaira Prieto	Spain	31:59.84	PB
5	Elisa Palmero	Italy	32:00.06	
6	Federica Del Buono	Italy	32:01.42	
7	Maruša Mišmaš Zrimšek	Slovenia	32:02.57	
8	Megan Keith	Great Britain & N.I.	32:04.81	SB
9	Lisa Merkel	Germany	32:09.07	
10	Lisa Rooms	Belgium	32:10.22	PB
11	Chloé Herbiet	Belgium	32:11.71	SB
12	Elżbieta Glinka	Poland	32:16.65	
13	Klara Lukan	Slovenia	32:18.16	SB
14	Mariana Machado	Portugal	32:27.09	
15	Hanne Mjøen Maridal	Norway	32:32.12	
16	Izzy Fry	Great Britain & N.I.	32:37.22	
17	Anna Marie Nordengen Sirevåg	Norway	32:41.21	
18	Jennifer Gulikers	Netherlands	32:48.71	
19	Carla Gallardo	Spain	33:02.58	
20	Fiona Everard	Ireland	33:08.60	
21	Alessia Zarbo	France	33:13.10	
22	Eva Dieterich	Germany	33:32.38	
23	Poppy Tank	Great Britain & N.I.	34:03.99	
—	Niamh Allen	Ireland	DNF	
—	Diane van Es	Netherlands	DNF	
