= Race and sports =

Issues related to race and sports

Issues related to race and sports have been examined by scholars for a long time. Among these issues are the observation that there are overrepresentation and underrepresentation of different races in different sports, with racial discrimination often proposed as the major cause.

== Participation and performance disparities ==
=== Sprinting ===
In 1991, Namibian (formerly South-West Africa) Frankie Fredericks became the first sub-10-second 100 metres runner of non-West African heritage and in 2003 Australia's Patrick Johnson (who has Irish and Indigenous Australian heritage) became the first to achieve the feat without an African background.

In 2010, Frenchman Christophe Lemaitre became the first white European under ten seconds, (although Poland's Marian Woronin had unofficially surpassed the barrier with a time of 9.992 seconds in 1984). In 2017, Ramil Guliyev became the second white sprinter in history to break the 10-second barrier. In 2011, Zimbabwean Ngonidzashe Makusha became the 76th man to break the barrier, yet only the fourth man not of West African descent. No sprinter from South Asia or North Africa has officially achieved this feat. In 2015 Su Bingtian of China became the first ethnic East Asian athlete to officially break the 10 second barrier and British athlete Adam Gemili—who is of mixed Iranian and Moroccan descent—became the first athlete with either North African or Middle Eastern heritage to break the ten second barrier. Before the 2004 Athens Games, 494 of the top 500 times for the 100m were held by sprinters who were of West African descent.

Olympic 100 m medallists in the early phase of the Modern Olympic Games were principally white, Western sprinters of European descent, largely reflecting the euro-centric make up of the nations that took part and the ideological environment of racial segregation at the time. As the Olympic competition began to attract wider international participation, athletes with African heritage began to reach and eventually dominate the 100 m Olympic podium, particularly African-Americans and Afro-Caribbeans.

Eddie Tolan became the first non-white winner of the event in 1932 and this signified the start of a prolonged period of success by black male sprinters; since 1932 only five men's Olympic champions in the event have not had significant African heritage. The women's event was dominated by runners of European descent until Wilma Rudolph won the title in 1960. Soviet and German women returned to the podium in the period from 1972 to 1980, but since then African-American and Jamaican women have won the great majority of 100 m medals. Dominance in the men's event has been particularly pronounced from 1984 to 2016, during which time in a span of almost 40 years all the men's Olympic 100 m finalists have been of African heritage.

In the 2020 Olympics, Chinese sprinter Su Bingtian ran 9.83 in his semi-final heat and became the first athlete without African heritage to run sub-9.90 or sub-9.85 and the first athlete without African heritage to reach the final since 1980 within the span of 40 years, setting the fastest 60 metres split record en route. 9.83 is also the second fastest semi-final time and made him the fifth fastest man in the history of 100 metres at the Olympics behind Usain Bolt, Yohan Blake, Justin Gatlin and Marcel Jacobs.

=== Endurance running ===
Many Nilotic groups also excel in long and middle distance running. It has been suggested that this may be a function of slim body morphology and slender legs, a preponderance of slow twitch muscle fibers, a low heart rate gained from living at high-altitude, as well as a culture of running to school from a young age. A study by Pitsiladis et al. (2006) questioning 404 elite distance runners from Kenya found that 76% of the international-class respondents hailed from the Kalenjin ethnic group and that 79% spoke a Nilotic language. As of January 2021, of the 100 athletes from each sex holding the best marathon times in history, 76 women and 93 men were born in East Africa.

Joseph L. Graves argues that Kenyan athletes from the African Great Lakes region who have done well in long distance running all have come from high-altitude areas, whereas those from low-altitude areas do not perform particularly well. He also argues that Koreans and Ecuadorians from high-altitude areas compete well with Kenyans in long-distance races. According to Graves, this suggests that it is the fact of having trained in a high altitude, combined with possible local level physiological adaptations to high-altitude environments that is behind the success in long distance running, not race.

Graves also argues that while it is superficially true that most of the world record-holders in the 100-meter dash are of West African heritage, they also all have partial genetic heritage from Europe and Native America, they have also all trained outside of West Africa, and West African nations have not trained any top-level runners. Graves says these factors make it impossible to say to which degree the success is best attributed to genetic or to environmental factors.

=== Views in the United States ===
Various individuals, including scholars and sportswriters, have commented on the apparent over-representations and under-representations of different races in different sports. African Americans accounted for 75% of players in the National Basketball Association (NBA) near the end of 2008. According to the latest National Consortium for Academics and Sports equality report card, 65% of National Football League players were African Americans. However, in 2008, about 8.5% of Major League Baseball players were African American (who make up about 13% of the US population), and 29.1% were Hispanics of any race (compared with about 16% of the US population). In 2020, less than 5% of the National Hockey League (NHL) players are black or of mixed black heritage.

=== Chinese views ===
The idea among Chinese people that "genetic differences" cause Asian athletes to be "slower at sprinting" than their American, African or European rivals is "widely accepted". The People's Daily, a Chinese newspaper, wrote that Chinese are "suited" to sports that draw upon "agility and technique", such as table tennis, badminton, diving, and gymnastics. The newspaper said that Chinese people have "congenital shortcomings" and "genetic differences" that meant that they are disadvantaged at "purely athletic events" when competing against "black and white athletes". The success of hurdler Liu Xiang was explained by the hurdles event requiring technique which fit with the stereotype that Chinese are disciplined and intelligent. However, the recent successes of Chinese lightweight and middleweight weightlifters contradicts conventional belief, as weightlifting is one of the sports that demonstrates raw strength and explosive power best. Chinese and Korean professional weightlifters are especially overrepresented in olympic weightlifting, dominating international competitions such as weightlifting at the Summer Olympics and the International Weightlifting Federation.

Li Aidong, a researcher with the China Institute of Sports Science, said that sports coaches believed that Chinese athletes could have success in long jumping, high jumping and race walking. However, Li doubted that Chinese could compete in "pure sprinting", although there did not exist any "credible scientific studies" which supported the idea that "Asians" were disadvantaged in "sprinting". Professional sprinters Su Bingtian of China and Yoshihide Kiryū of Japan have contradicted this view of East Asians struggling to achieve quick footspeed, as both have broken the 10-second barrier in the 100 m and Su has ranked in the top five all-time fastest runners over 60 metres.

== Explanations for participation and performance disparities ==
=== Physiological factors ===
A 1994 examination of 32 English sport/exercise science textbooks found that seven suggested that there are biophysical differences due to race that might explain differences in sports performance, one expressed caution with the idea, and the other 24 did not mention the issue.

=== Socioeconomic factors ===
In Stuck in the Shallow End: Education, Race, and Computing, UCLA researcher Jane Margolis outlines the history of segregation in swimming in the United States to show how people of colour have been affected up to the present day by inadequate access to swimming facilities and lessons. Margolis asserts that physiological differences between ethnic groups are relatively minor and says: "In most cases of segregation, stereotypes and belief systems about different ethnic gender groups' genetic make-up and physical abilities (and inabilities) emerge to rationalize unequal access and resulting disparities." According to Margolis, views regarding "buoyancy problems" of African Americans are merely part of folklore which have been passed down from generation to generation. Joan Ferrante, a professor of sociology at Northern Kentucky University, suggests that geographic location, financial resources, and the influence of parents, peers, and role models are involved in channeling individuals of certain races towards particular sports and away from others.

=== Haplogroup inheritance ===
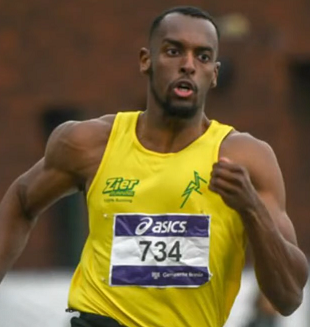
Although Horner athleticism is renowned for elite long-distance endurance performance, Horner athlete Mustafa Mahamuud is a standout exception of explosive short distance speed.

Elite athletic capacity has also been correlated with differing patterns of haplogroup inheritance. Moran et al. (2004) observed that among Y-DNA (paternal) clades borne by elite endurance athletes in Ethiopia, the E*, E3*, K*(xP), are positively correlated with elite athletic endurance performance, whereas the haplogroup E3b1 is significantly less frequent among the elite endurance athletes.

Citing haplogroup data from various previous studies, Ahmetov and Fedotovskaya (2012) report that the mtDNA (maternal) haplogroups I, H, L0, M*, G1, N9, and V have been positively correlated with elite athletic endurance performance, whereas the mtDNA haplogroups L3*, B, K, J2, and T are negatively correlated with athletic endurance performance. Japanese sprinters were also found to have a higher distribution of the mtDNA F.

== Racial prejudices, discrimination, segregation, and integration ==
The baseball color line, which included separate Negro league baseball, was one example of racial segregation in the United States.

In the United States, a study found that a form of racial discrimination exists in NBA basketball, as white players received higher salaries than do blacks related to actual performance. Funk says this may be due to viewer discrimination. Viewership increases when there is greater participation by white players, which means higher advertising incomes. This explains much of the salary gap.

=== Black Women + Bobsledding ===
Bobsledding has much representation for Black women. At the 2018 Winter Olympics, Nigerian and Jamaican bobsled teams debuted. The United States, Britain, Canada, and Germany also have Black women compete in bobsledding at the Olympic level. The high diversity is somewhat due to bobsledding recruiting athletes from other sports, especially track.

Black women who have competed in bobsled include: Vonetta Flowers, Elana Meyers Taylor, Lauryn Williams, and Sylvia Hoffman.

== Portrayals in film ==
While there are discrepancies in "based on a true story" sports movies, the movies are still representing the harsh realities of race and sports well.

Invictus deals with the subject of the 1995 Rugby World Cup in post-apartheid South Africa.

== Australia ==
Inequality in sport for the Aboriginal Australians exists due to material barriers. A 2007 report by the Australian Human Rights Commission suggested that fear of "racial vilification" was partly responsible for the under-representation of Aboriginal and other ethnic groups in Australian sports.

In the recent years, the influence of Polynesian players on the NRL National Rugby League has grown, with figures from the 2011 season showing that 35% of NRL players and over 45% of NRL Under-20s players are of Polynesian background. (By way of comparison, less than 3% of the Australian population identified themselves as Polynesian in the 2021 Australian census). This increase in Polynesian players has been blamed for the decline of Indigenous players, dropping from 21% in the 1990s to 11% for the 2009 season.

At the elite level of the game, Aboriginal Australians represented 35% of the roster for the Kangaroos, 21% of players at the 2012 State of Origin series, 12% of NRL players and a further 8% of the NRL Under-20s players. By way of comparison, 2.3% of the Australian population identified themselves as Indigenous in the 2006 Australian census.

== South Africa ==
In South Africa, black representation on the cricket and rugby national sports teams is ensured via the introduction of quotas.

== See also ==
- Rugby union and apartheid
- 10-second barrier
- Melanin theory
