= 2026 European 10,000m Cup =

- Organisers: European Athletics
- Edition: 28th
- Date: 23 May
- Host city: La Spezia, Italy
- Venue: Centro Sportivo A. Montagna
- Events: 4
- Participation: 29 nations

The 27th edition of the European 10,000m Cup took place on 24 May 2025, in Pacé, France.

== Medallists ==
Event	Gold	Silver	Bronze
Individual
Men	(Italy) Iliass Aouani; 27:50.05	(France) Simon Bedard; 27:52.66	(France) Valentin Gondouin; 27:53.09
Women	(Poland) Elżbieta Glinka; 31:45.36	(France) Alessia Zarbo; 31:56.18	(Italy) Elisa Palmero; 31:59.49
Team
Men	France; 1:23:40.28	Italy; 1:24:36.65	Spain; 1:25:23.46
Women	Italy; 1:37:24.57	Ireland; 1:38:16.07	Spain; 1:38:42.07

== Results ==
=== Men's ===
Individual race
Rank	Heat	Athlete	Nationality	Time	Note
1st place, gold medalist(s)	A	Iliass Aouani	Italy	27:50.05	SB
2nd place, silver medalist(s)	A	Simon Bedard	France	27:52.66	
3rd place, bronze medalist(s)	A	Valentin Gondouin	France	27:53.09	SB
4	A	Simon Debognies	Belgium	27:54.06	SB
5	A	Baptiste Guyon	France	27:54.53	PB
6	A	Pasquale Selvarolo	Italy	28:00.03	PB
7	A	Jesús Ramos	Spain	28:11.26	SB
8	A	Bastien Augusto	France	28:19.79	PB
9	A	Eduardo Menacho	Spain	28:26.40	
10	A	Gábor Karsai	Hungary	28:31.00	PB
11	A	Bas van Hooren	Netherlands	28:31.54	PB
12	A	Robin Hendrix	Belgium	28:34.05	SB
13	A	Giedrius Valinčius	Lithuania	28:44.68	PB
14	A	Mesfin Escamilla	Spain	28:45.80	
15	A	Konjoneh Maggi	Italy	28:46.57	
16	A	Alberto Mondazzi	Italy	28:46.58	SB
17	A	Nahuel Carabaña	Andorra	28:47.06	NR
18	A	Pablo Alba	Spain	28:52.00	
19	A	Miguel Borges	Portugal	28:56.05	SB
20	A	Juan Antonio Pérez	Spain	28:57.66	SB
21	A	Oliver Löfqvist	Sweden	29:03.88	SB
22	B	Matthew Ramsden	Great Britain	29:11.69	PB
23	B	Martin Zajíc	Czech Republic	29:13.02	SB
24	B	Rui Pinto	Portugal	29:13.86	SB
25	B	Lorenzo Brunier	Italy	29:17.06	PB
26	B	Oisín Ó Gailín	Ireland	29:17.30	SB
27	A	Francesco Guerra	Italy	29:25.86	SB
28	B	Seare Weldezghi	ART	29:28.41	PB
29	A	Duarte Gomes	Portugal	29:36.00	SB
30	B	Jack Kavanagh	Great Britain	29:47.08	SB
31	B	Frank Futselaar	Netherlands	29:55.77	SB
32	B	Ádám Lomb	Hungary	29:58.32	
33	B	Jan Kokalj	Slovenia	29:59.15	PB
34	B	Morten Siht	Estonia	30:07.45	PB
35	B	Tomislav Novosel	Croatia	30:09.88	
36	B	Jamie Battle	Ireland	30:11.63	SB
37	B	Guillaume Cachelin	Switzerland	30:19.64	SB
38	B	Cas Kopmels	Netherlands	30:24.27	SB
39	B	Robin Mennet	Switzerland	30:27.81	PB
40	B	Luke Micallef	Malta	30:30.39	PB
41	B	Ties van den Hurk	Netherlands	30:33.10	SB
42	A	Abdulhalik Çağıran	Turkey	30:38.02	
43	B	Vadym Lonskyi	Ukraine	30:38.76	
44	B	Gianluca Assorgia	Netherlands	31:00.17	SB
45	B	Maxim Raileanu	Maldives	31:01.98	SB
46	B	Tom Hoogeboom	Netherlands	31:28.13	SB
47	B	Enbiya Yazıcı	Turkey	31:45.52	
48	A	Mert Selek	Turkey	32:01.01	
	B	Nino Freitag	Switzerland	DNF	
	A	Emile Hafashimana	Burundi	DNF	Pace
	A	Célestin Ndikumana	Burundi	DNF	Pace
	A	Callum Morgan	Ireland	DNF	
	B	Thierry Irakoze	Burundi	DNF	Pace
	B	Michael Murphy	Ireland	DNF	

Teams
Rank	Team	Time	Note
1st place, gold medalist(s)	France	1:23:40.28	
2nd place, silver medalist(s)	Italy	1:24:36.65	
3rd place, bronze medalist(s)	Spain	1:25:23.46	
4	Portugal	1:27:45.91	
5	Netherlands	1:28:51.58	
6	Turkey	1:34:24.55	
	Switzerland	–	
	Ireland	–	

=== Women's ===
Individual race
Rank	Heat	Athlete	Nationality	Time	Note
1st place, gold medalist(s)	A	Elżbieta Glinka	Poland	31:45.36	PB
2nd place, silver medalist(s)	A	Alessia Zarbo	France	31:56.18	SB
3rd place, bronze medalist(s)	A	Elisa Palmero	Italy	31:59.49	SB
4	A	Jennifer Gulikers	Netherlands	32:01.57	PB
5	A	Mariana Machado	Portugal	32:11.96	PB
6	A	Niamh Allen	Ireland	32:15.79	SB
7	A	Federica Del Buono	Italy	32:27.95	SB
8	A	Alicia Berzosa	Spain	32:32.48	SB
9	A	Derya Kunur	Turkey	32:40.60	PB
10	A	Fiona Everard	Ireland	32:41.28	PB
11	A	Beatriz Álvarez	Spain	32:47.71	
12	A	Tereza Hrochová	Czech Republic	32:51.72	PB
13	A	Elvanie Nimbona	Italy	32:57.13	SB
14	A	Rebecca Lonedo	Italy	32:58.13	PB
15	A	Nataliya Strebkova	Ukraine	33:00.43	PB
16	A	Jess Martin	Great Britain	33:09.61	SB
17	A	Amelia Quirk	Great Britain	33:15.33	SB
18	A	Charlotte Dannatt	Great Britain	33:18.04	SB
19	A	Bahar Yıldırım	Turkey	33:18.27	
20	A	Sorcha Nic Dhomhnaill	Ireland	33:19.00	SB
21	A	Isabel Barreiro	Spain	33:21.88	
22	B	Cordula Lassacher	Austria	33:22.44	PB
23	A	Lucy Jones	Great Britain	33:25.13	SB
24	A	Nina Chydenius	Finland	33:28.19	SB
25	B	Greta Settino	Italy	33:31.10	PB
26	A	Mariia Mazurenko	Ukraine	33:31.46	SB
27	B	Ineke van Koldam	Netherlands	33:36.47	PB
28	B	Andrea Romero	Spain	33:41.35	SB
29	A	Irene Sánchez-Escribano	Spain	33:46.24	
30	A	Viktoriia Shkurko	Ukraine	33:50.32	PB
31	A	Farida Abaroge	ART	33:54.07	SB
32	B	Marta Galimany	Spain	34:10.56	SB
33	B	Anna Marie Nordengen Sirevåg	Norway	34:30.81	SB
34	B	Federica Zanne	Italy	34:31.30	
35	A	Nursena Çeto	Turkey	34:32.25	PB
36	B	Faye Dervan	Ireland	34:32.84	PB
37	B	Vaida Žusinaite-Nekriošiene	Lithuania	34:33.00	PB
38	B	Lisa De Bruyn	Switzerland	34:33.59	PB
39	B	Lizzie Wellsted	Great Britain	34:33.59	SB
40	B	Emily Haggard-Kearney	Ireland	34:39.91	SB
41	B	Patricia Jackman	Ireland	34:40.54	SB
42	B	Mónica Silva	Portugal	34:41.63	PB
43	B	Tetiana Kohut	Ukraine	34:43.31	
44	B	Holly Weedall	Great Britain	35:35.86	SB
	A	Francine Niyomukunzi	Burundi	DNF	Pace
	A	Susana Santos	Portugal	DNF	
	B	Devora Avramova	Bulgaria	DNF	
	B	Tess Goessens	Netherlands	DNF	
	B	Agate Caune	Latvia	DNF	
	B	Giulia Fulginiti	Switzerland	DNF	
	B	Andrea Meier	Switzerland	DNF	
	B	Joyce Mattagliano	Italy	DNF	Pace
	B	Madalina-Elena Sîrbu	Romania	DNF	
	B	Lisa Redlinger	Austria	DNS	

Teams
Rank	Team	Time	Note
1st place, gold medalist(s)	Italy	1:37:24.57	
2nd place, silver medalist(s)	Ireland	1:38:16.07	
3rd place, bronze medalist(s)	Spain	1:38:42.07	
4	Great Britain	1:39:42.98	
5	Ukraine	1:40:22.21	
6	Turkey	1:40:31.12	
	Netherlands	–	
	Portugal	–	
	Switzerland	–	
