= 2021 European Athletics U23 Championships – Women's 5000 metres =

Women's 5000 metres at the 2021 European Athletics U23 Championships
- Venue: Kadriorg Stadium, Tallinn
- Dates: 11 July
- Competitors: 14 from 9 nations
- Winning time: 15:37.4-

Medalists
gold medal	Nadia Battocletti	Italy
silver medal	Klara Lukan	Slovenia
bronze medal	Diane van Es	Netherlands

The women's 5000 metres event at the 2021 European Athletics U23 Championships was held in Tallinn, Estonia, at Kadriorg Stadium on 11 July.

== Records ==
Prior to the competition, the records were as follows:

European U23 record	Elvan Abeylegesse (TUR)	14:24.68	Bergen, Norway	11 June 2004
Championship U23 record	Yasemin Can (TUR)	15:01.67	Bydgoszcz, Poland	16 July 2017

== Results ==
Hand timing due to stadium power cut

Rank	Name	Nationality	Time	Notes
1st place, gold medalist(s)	Nadia Battocletti	Italy	15:37.4-	
2nd place, silver medalist(s)	Klara Lukan	Slovenia	15:44.0-	
3rd place, bronze medalist(s)	Diane van Es	Netherlands	15:48.4-	
4	Isabel Barreiro	Spain	15:51.3-	
5	Manon Trapp	France	15:52.7-	
6	Cristina Ruiz	Spain	15:54.8-	
7	Alessia Zarbo	France	15:57.9-	
8	Izzy Fry	Great Britain	16:01.6-	
9	Lia Lemos	Portugal	16:13.2-	
10	Yonca Kutluk	Turkey	16:33.1-	
11	Carla Gallardo	Spain	16:35.4-	
12	Sara Duarte	Portugal	16:35.6-	
13	Julia Afelt	Poland	16:42.6-	
	Mariana Machado	Portugal	DNF	
	Eleanor Bolton	Great Britain	DNS	
	Andrea Modin Engesæth	Norway	DNS	
	Beata Topka	Poland	DNS	
