= 2018 IAAF World U20 Championships – Women's 3000 metres =

Women's 3000 metres at the 2018 World U20 Championships
- Venue: Ratina Stadium
- Dates: 11 July
- Competitors: 20 from 13 nations
- Winning time: 8:54.01

Medalists
gold medal	Nozomi Tanaka	Japan
silver medal	Meselu Berhe	Ethiopia
bronze medal	Tsigie Gebreselama	Ethiopia

The women's 3000 metres at the 2018 IAAF World U20 Championships was held at Ratina Stadium on 11 July.

== Records ==
Standing records prior to the 2018 IAAF World U20 Championships in Athletics
World Junior Record	Zola Pieterse (GBR)	8:28.83	Rome, Italy	7 September 1985
Championship Record	Beyenu Degefa (ETH)	8:41.76	Bydgoszcz, Poland	20 July 2016
World Junior Leading	Meskerem Mamo (ETH)	8:33.63	Doha, Qatar	4 May 2018

== Results ==
Rank	Name	Nationality	Time	Note
1st place, gold medalist(s)	Nozomi Tanaka	Japan	8:54.01	PB
2nd place, silver medalist(s)	Meselu Berhe	Ethiopia	8:56.39	PB
3rd place, bronze medalist(s)	Tsigie Gebreselama	Ethiopia	8:59.20	PB
4	Yuna Wada	Japan	9:00.50	PB
5	Zenah Jemutai Yego	Kenya	9:00.76	PB
6	Amelia Mazza-Downie	Australia	9:09.19	PB
7	Carla Gallardo	Spain	9:10.07	PB
8	Nadia Battocletti	Italy	9:13.45	PB
9	Cristina Ruiz	Spain	9:13.75	PB
10	Taryn O'Neill	Canada	9:15.03	PB
11	Lara Crouch	Australia	9:16.28	PB
12	Cailie Logue	United States	9:16.78	PB
13	Josina Papenfuß	Germany	9:18.39	PB
14	Amanda Vestri	United States	9:21.95	PB
15	Katrina Robinson	New Zealand	9:22.80	
16	Cameron Ormond	Canada	9:27.51	
17	Astrid Snäll	Finland	9:32.25	PB
18	Lamyae Himi	Morocco	9:41.32	
	Silviya Georgieva	Bulgaria	DNF	
	Mercy Chepkorir Kirarei	Kenya	DNS	
