= Selamawit Teferi =

Israeli runner (born 1994)

Selamawit ("Selam") Teferi
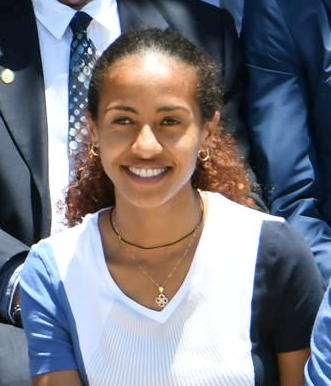
- Teferi in 2021

Personal information
- Native name: סלאמוויט באיולין-טפרי
- Full name: Selamawit Dagnachew Bayoulgn-Teferi
- National team: Israel
- Citizenship: Israeli
- Born: Selamawit Dagnachew Bayoulgn ሰላማዊት ዳኛቸው ባዩልኝ; 24 March 1994 (age 32) Ethiopia
- Spouse: Marhu Teferi

Sport
- Country: Israel
- Sport: Athletics
- Events: 800 meters, 1,500 meters, 5,000 meters, 10,000 meters, 15 kilometers

Achievements and titles
- National finals: won Israeli championships at 800 meters (2017) and 1,500 meters (2019)
- Personal bests: 5,000 meters (14:53 in July 2020); women's road running (50:48 in September 2019); 10,000 meters (31:19.50 in June 2021)

Selamawit ("Selam") Dagnachew Bayoulgn-Teferi (Hebrew: סלאמוויט דאגנאצ'ו באיולין-טפרי; born 24 March 1994) is an Olympic runner. Born in Ethiopia, she qualified to represent Israel at the 2020 Summer Olympics in Tokyo in the 5,000 meters. She has also won Israeli championships at 800 meters and 1,500 meters.

== Early and personal life ==
Selamawit was born in Ethiopia, to a non-Jewish family. She became an Israeli citizen in April 2018, on account of her marriage to an Israeli citizen.

She is married to Ethiopian-born Israeli Olympic marathoner Marhu Teferi, who also competed in the 2020 Summer Olympics. They are the first married couple to represent Israel at the Olympics.

== Running career ==
Selamawit won the Israeli National Championship in 800 meters with a time of 2:13.11 on July 5, 2017, and won the Israeli National Championship in 1,500 meters with a time of 4:14.07 on July 4, 2019.

As of November 2019, her highest world ranking in the 5,000 meters was 22nd (and her personal best was 15:08.39 in July 2019), her highest world ranking in women's road running was 28th (and her personal best was 50:48 in September 2019; the third-fastest time in the world for the year), and her highest world ranking in 10,000 meters was 57th (and her personal best was 32:16.84 in April 2019). At the same time, Selamawit's time in the 15 kilometers of 49:21 in February 2019 was the 12th-fastest in the world for the year. In July 2019, she won the 1,500 meters with a 4.11.37 at the 18th Meeting International de la Province de Liège.

Selamawit qualified to represent Israel at the 2020 Summer Olympics in Tokyo in the 5,000 meters with a time of 15:08.39 in the Guldensporenmeeting in Kortrijk, Belgium, on July 13, 2019, where she won a bronze medal. She placed 10th in the Olympic final.
