= Nadia Battocletti =

Italian long-distance runner (born 2000)

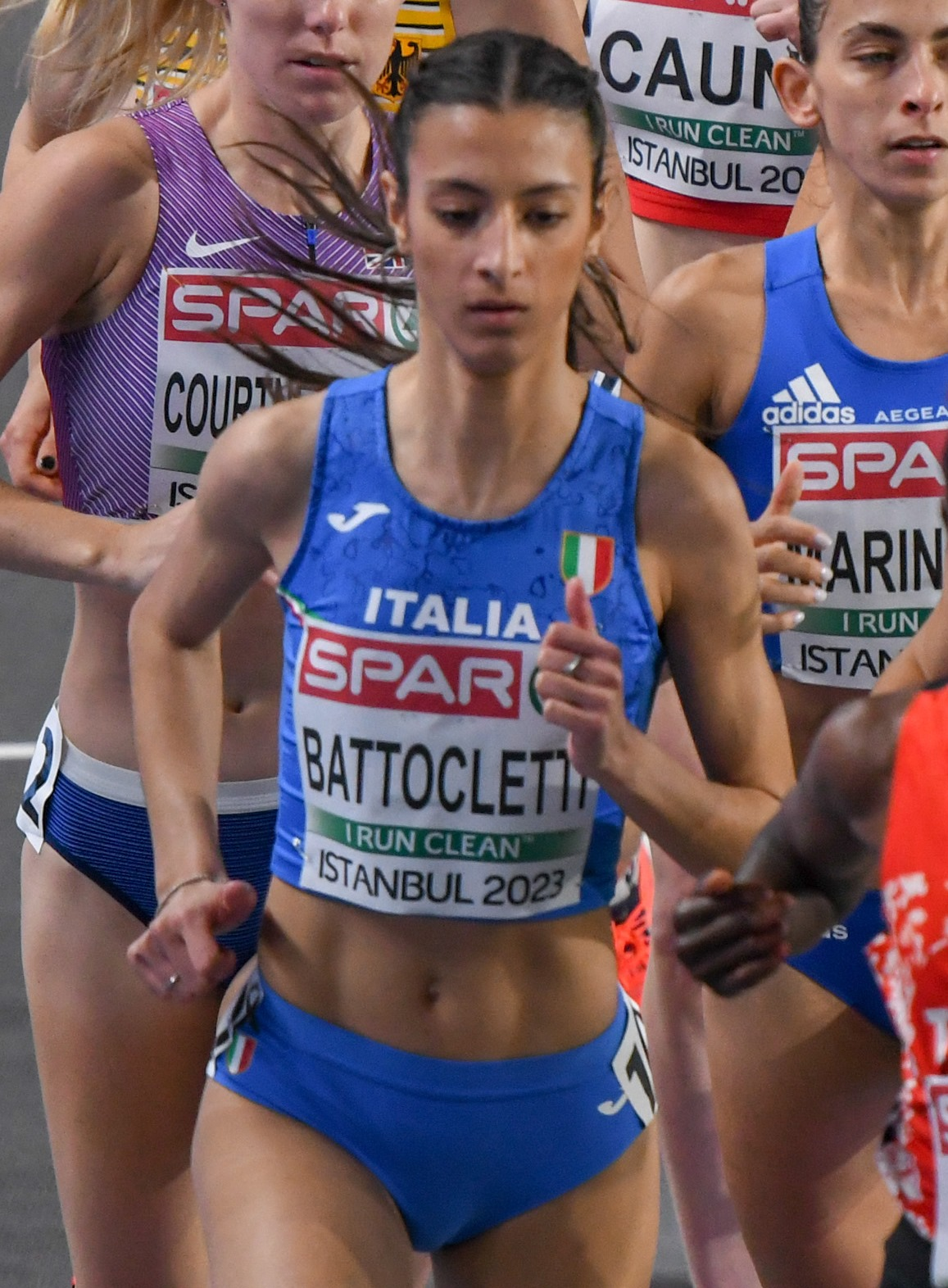
- Battocletti at the 2023 European Indoor Championships in Istanbul, Turkey

Personal information
- National team: Italy: 15 caps (2020-)
- Born: 12 April 2000 (age 26) Cles, Trentino, Italy
- Height: 1.68 m (5 ft 6 in)
- Weight: 49 kg (108 lb)

Sport
- Sport: Athletics
- Events: Middle-, Long-distance running Cross-country running
- Club: G.S. Fiamme Azzurre
- Coached by: Giuliano Battocletti (her father)

Achievements and titles
- Personal bests: 1500 m: 3:57.54 NR (Bellinzona 2026); 3000 m: 8:26.27 NR (Rabat 2025); 5000 m: 14:23.15 NR (Rome 2025); 10,000 m: 30:38.25 NR (Tokyo 2025); Indoors; 1500 m: 4:03.59 NR (Madrid 2026); 3000 m: 8:26.44 NR (Lievin 2026); Road; 5K run: 14:32 NR (Tokyo 2025); 10K run: 30:08 NR (Lille 2026)
Medal record
Women's athletics
Representing Italy
International competitions
Event	1st	2nd	3rd
Olympic Games	0	1	0
World Championships	0	1	1
World Indoor Championships	1	0	0
European Championships	4	0	0
European Games	1	1	0
European Cross Country C'ships	7	4	0
European U23 Championships	1	0	0
European U20 Championships	0	1	1
Total	14	8	2
Olympic Games
Silver medal – second place	2024 Paris	10,000 m
World Championships
Silver medal – second place	2025 Tokyo	10,000 m
Bronze medal – third place	2025 Tokyo	5000 m
World Indoor Championships
Gold medal – first place	2026 Toruń	3000 m
European Championships
Gold medal – first place	2024 Rome	5000 m
Gold medal – first place	2024 Rome	10000 m
Gold medal – first place	2026 Birmingham	5000 m
Gold medal – first place	2026 Birmingham	10000 m
European Running Championships
Gold medal – first place	2025 Brussels	10 km
European Games
Gold medal – first place	2023 Kraków-Małopolska	Team race
Silver medal – second place	2023 Kraków-Małopolska	5000 m
European U23 Championships
Gold medal – first place	2021 Tallinn	5000 m
European U20 Championships
Silver medal – second place	2019 Borås	5000 m
Bronze medal – third place	2017 Grosseto	3000 m
European Cross Country Championships
Gold medal – first place	2018 Tilburg	U20 race
Gold medal – first place	2019 Lisbon	U20 race
Gold medal – first place	2021 Dublin	U23 race
Gold medal – first place	2021 Dublin	U23 team
Gold medal – first place	2022 Turin	U23 race
Gold medal – first place	2024 Antalya	Senior race
Gold medal – first place	2024 Antalya	Senior team
Gold medal – first place	2025 Lagoa	Senior race
Silver medal – second place	2017 Šamorín	U20 team
Silver medal – second place	2019 Lisbon	U20 team
Silver medal – second place	2022 Turin	U23 team
Silver medal – second place	2023 Brussels	Senior race

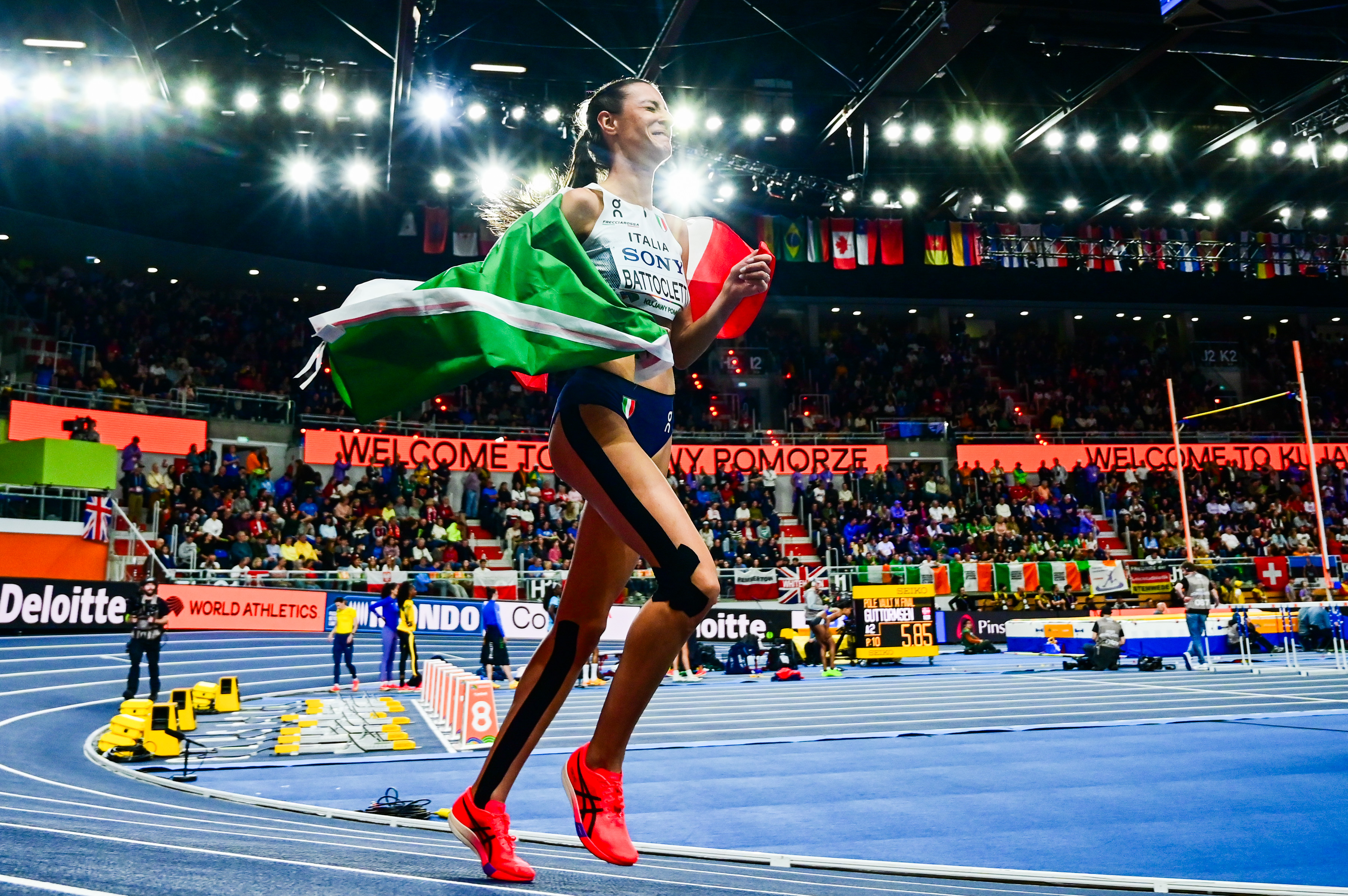
At the 2026 World Indoor Championships, held in Toruń, Poland, Battocletti won world title in 3000 m.

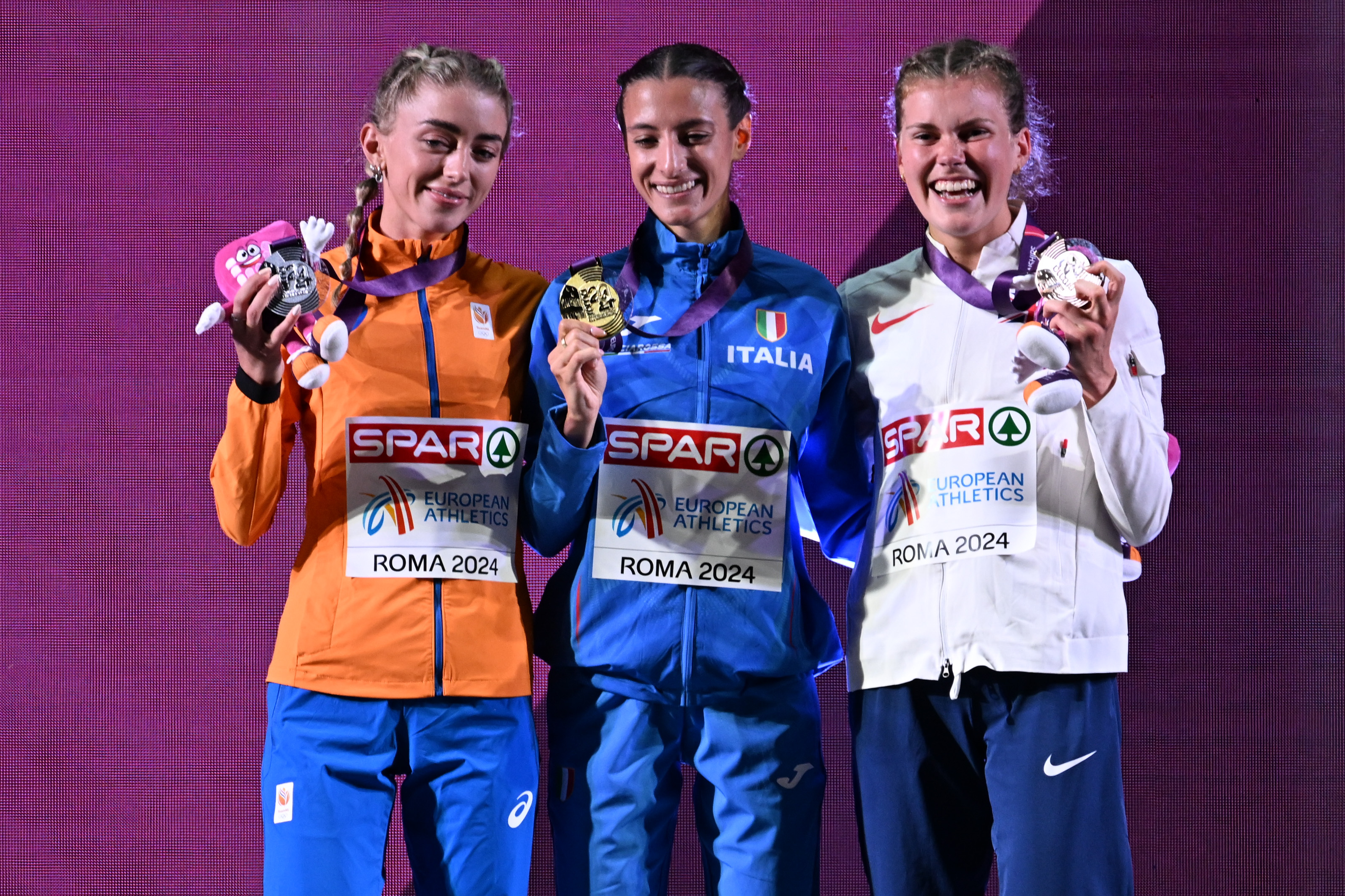
Battocletti (center) on the 10,000 m podium at the 2024 European Athletics Championships

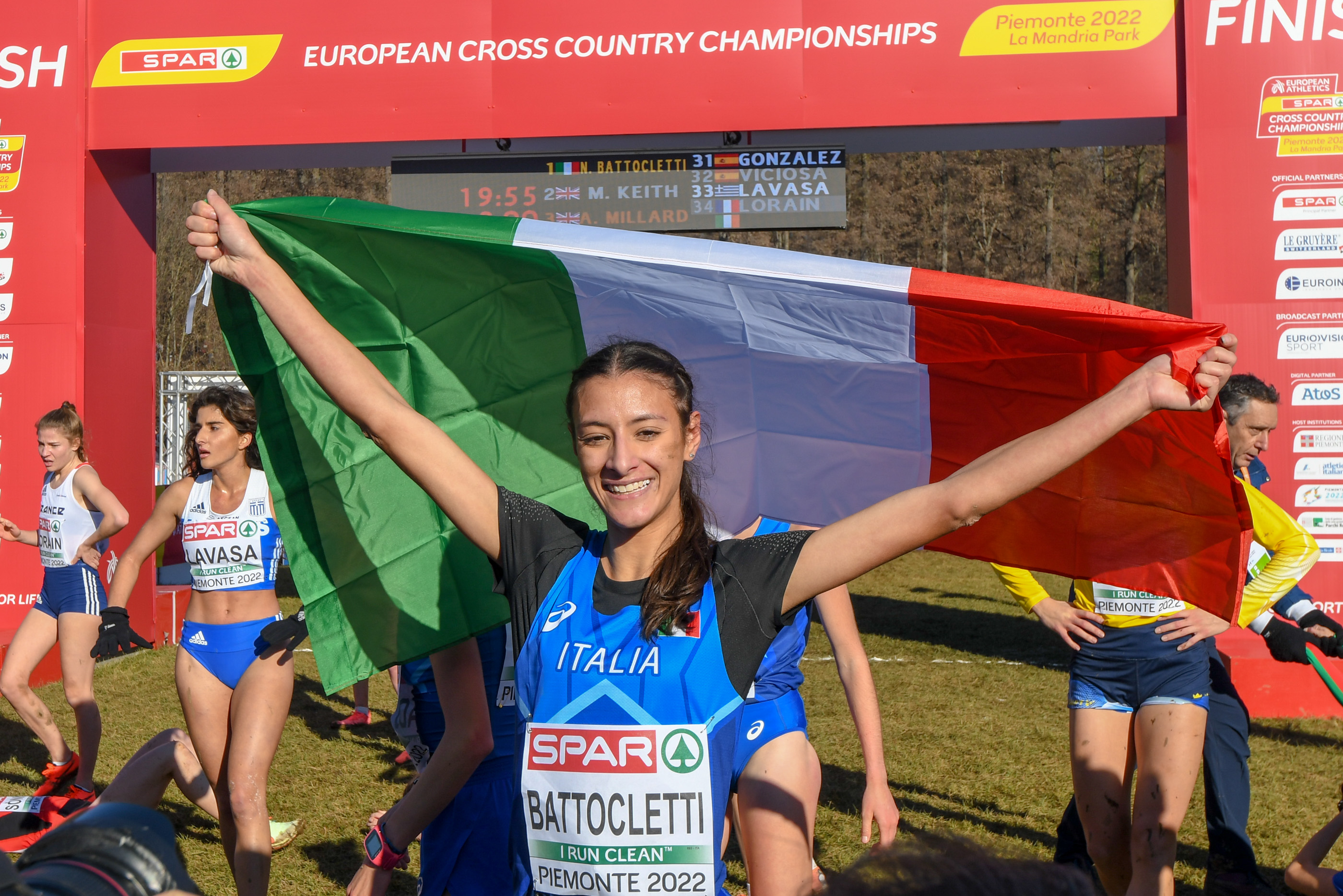
At the 2022 European Cross Country Championships, held in Turin, Italy, Battocletti took her fourth consecutive continental age-group cross country victory.

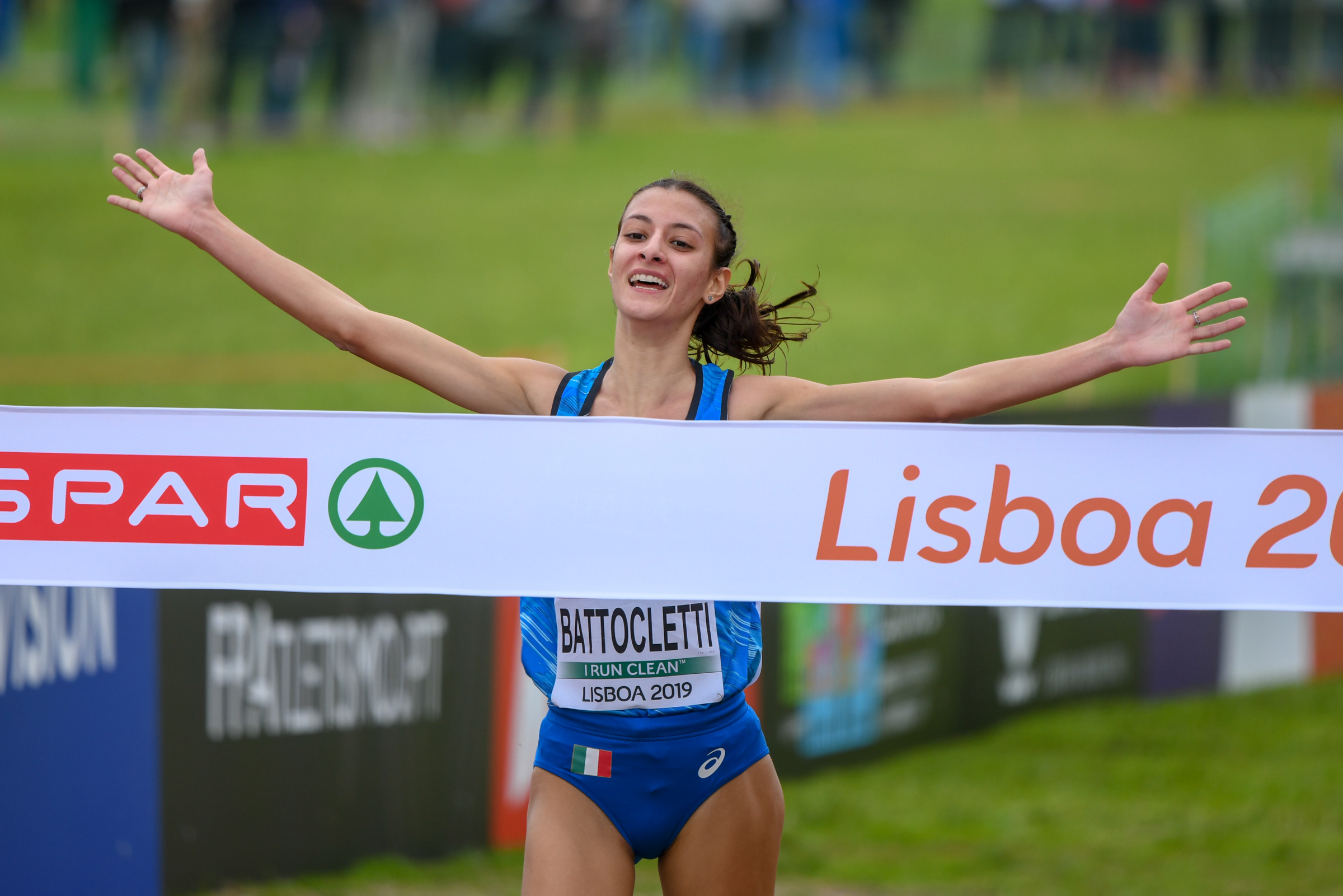
Battocletti's triumphal finish in the U20 race at the 2019 European Cross Country Championships held in Lisbon, Portugal

Nadia Battocletti (born 12 April 2000) is an Italian middle- and long-distance runner. At the 2024 Summer Olympics, she won a silver medal in the 10,000 m and placed fourth in the 5000 m. She won gold medals in the 5000 m and 10,000 m at both the 2024 and 2026 European Championships.

In 2021, Battocletti won gold over 5000 m at the European U23 Championships. She went onto place seventh in the event at the delayed 2020 Summer Olympics. At the 2024 European Championships, she won gold in the 5000 m and 10,000 m. She won silver in the 10,000 m and placed fourth in the 5000 m at the 2024 Summer Olympics. In December of that year, she won gold in the senior race at the European Cross Country Championships. At the 2025 World Championships, she won a silver in the 10,000 m and bronze in the 5000 m, before retaining her European Cross Country title later that year. In 2026, she won gold over 3000 m at the World Indoor Championships and retained her 5000 m and 10,000 m European titles.

Battocletti has won the 5000 m at the European Team Championships three times (2021, 2023, 2025). She holds a total of nine Italian national records including in the 1500 metres, 3000 metres, 5000 metres and 10,000 metres. She holds the European record for the road 5 km. Her 5000 m best of 14:23.15 also makes her the second-fastest European of all time in the event. She is an eleven-time national champion.

== Biography ==
Battocletti was born on 12 April 2000 in Cles, Trentino, to an Italian father and a Moroccan-born mother. As of 2022, she lives in her native Trentino region of northern Italy, where she was a student of architecture engineering at the University of Trento. She is coached by her father Giuliano, a former national champion long-distance runner. Battocletti is Muslim and has spoken about the challenges of adjusting her training schedule for Ramadan.

== Career ==
She won the gold medal for the 5000 metres at the 2021 European Under-23 Championships. Battocletti earned four individual gold medals in the U20 and U23 age groups at the European Cross Country Championships. She is the Italian record holder for the indoor 3000 metres and 5 km road race.

As a 17-year-old, Battocletti won the bronze medal in the 3000 m at the 2017 European U20 Championships. At the 2019 edition of this championships, she earned silver for the 5000 m. She represented Italy at the 2020 Tokyo Olympics competing in the 5000 m. She won an Italian national title at senior level in 2018, becoming the first Italian millennial to do that. Battocletti is a seven-time national senior champion and, as of 2023, has amassed 31 Italian titles across all surfaces and age-groups.

In August 2019 in Gothenburg, Sweden, she broke Italian under-20 record in the 3000 metres that had lasted for more than 30 years in a time of 9:04.46. In December that year, Battocletti was elected European Athlete of the Month by the European Athletic Association (EAA), the only Italian to succeed in this undertaking in 2019.

At the postponed 2020 Tokyo Olympics in 2021, the 21-year-old competed in the women's 5000 metres event, finishing seventh in the final in a personal best of 14:46.29.

=== 2022–present ===
On 14 February 2022, Battocletti set her first senior Italian record at a meeting in Val-de-Reuil, France, breaking almost 15-year-old 3000 m indoor record of 8:44.81 established by Silvia Weissteiner; she clocked a 8:41.72 performance to finish second. On 23 April that year, she broke the national best in the two miles in Milan. Just seven days later, Battocletti set an Italian record in the 5 km road race at the adizero Road to Records event in Herzogenaurach, Germany, improving her personal best by 42 seconds for sixth place. She broke Maura Viceconte's record dating back to 2000 by 32 seconds.

The 22-year-old missed the World Championships held in Eugene, Oregon, U.S. in July with shin splints injury. In August, she was hit by glandular fever at the European Championships Munich 2022, where she finished seventh in the 5000 m.

At the pre-championships press conference of the European Cross Country Championships on home soil in Turin in December, Battocletti revealed that she had been on antibiotics until ten days back. Despite this, she won decisively on a hilly and demanding 5.722 km course her fourth consecutive European Cross Country gold medal, successfully defending her U23 title. She became only the second runner in history to claim back-to-back U23 titles.

At the Paris 2024 Olympics, Battocletti finished in fourth place in the women's 5000 metres, setting a national record for Italy with a time of 14:31.64. Initially upgraded to bronze following Faith Kipyegon's disqualification for obstruction, she was displaced from the podium after Kipyegon was reinstated following Kenya's successful appeal. She proceeded to win the silver medal in the women's 10,000 metres, setting a national record for Italy with a time of 30:43.35.

In 2025, Battocletti lowered her own Italian national record in the 10,000 m at the World Championships in Tokyo. She finished second overall in 30:38.23 and received the silver medal, her first World Championships medal.

In 2026, despite being an outdoor specialist and training while observing Ramadan, Battocletti won gold in the 3000 m at the World Indoor Championships.

On 11 August 2026, Battocletti won the gold medal in the 5000 metres at the European Championships in Birmingham, England. Three days later, she won the 10,000 metres gold medal.

== Statistics ==
=== Personal bests ===
She holds nine national records at the senior level.

Outdoor

- 1500 metres: 3:58.15 (Rovereto, Italy, 2 June 2025)
- 3000 metres: 8:26.27 (Rabat, Morocco, 25 May 2025) NR
- 5000 metres: 14:23.15 (Rome, Italy, 6 June 2025) NR
- 10,000 metres: 30:38.23 (Tokyo, Japan, 13 September 2025) NR
- 2 miles: 30:08 (Milan, Italy, 23 April 2022) NR

Indoor

- 1500 metres: 4:03.59 (Madrid, Spain, 6 February 2026) NR
- 3000 metres: 8:26.44 (Liévin, France, 19 February 2026) NR

Road

- 5 km: 14:32 (Tokyo, Japan, 3 May 2025) ER
- 10 km: 30:08 (Lille, France, 4 April 2026) NR

=== Achievements ===
Representing Italy
Year	Competition	Venue	Position	Event	Time
2016	European U18 Championships	Tbilisi, Georgia	6th	3000 m	9:49.53
2017	World Cross Country Championships	Kampala, Uganda	34th	U20 race	21:27
2017	European U20 Championships	Grosseto, Italy	3rd	3000 m	9:24.01 PB
2017	European Cross Country Championships	Šamorín, Slovakia	5th	XC 4.18 km U20	14:07
2017	European Cross Country Championships	Šamorín, Slovakia	2nd	U20 team	33 pts
2018	World U20 Championships	Tampere, Finland	8th	3000 m	9:13.45 PB
2018	European Cross Country Championships	Tilburg, Netherlands	1st	XC 4.3 km U20	13:46
2018	European Cross Country Championships	Tilburg, Netherlands	5th	U20 team	41 pts
2019	World Cross Country Championships	Aarhus, Denmark	23rd	U20 race	22:24
2019	European U20 Championships	Borås, Sweden	2nd	5000 m	16:09.39 PB
2019	European Cross Country Championships	Lisbon, Portugal	1st	XC 4.3 km U20	13:58
2019	European Cross Country Championships	Lisbon, Portugal	2nd	U20 team	29 pts
2021	European Team Championships Super League	Chorzów, Poland	1st	5000 m	15:46.95
2021	European U23 Championships	Tallinn, Estonia	1st	5000 m	15:37.4
2021	Olympic Games	Tokyo, Japan	7th	5000 m	14:46:29 PB
2021	European Cross Country Championships	Dublin, Ireland	1st	XC 6.0 km U23	20:32
2021	European Cross Country Championships	Dublin, Ireland	1st	U23 team	18 pts
2022	European Championships	Munich, Germany	7th	5000 m	15:10.90 SB
2022	European Cross Country Championships	Turin, Italy	1st	XC 5.722 km U23	19:55
2022	European Cross Country Championships	Turin, Italy	2nd	U23 team	31 pts
2023	European Indoor Championships	Istanbul, Turkey	4th	3000 m	8:44.96 SB
2023	World Championships	Budapest, Hungary	16th	5000 m	15:27.86
2024	European Championships	Rome, Italy	1st	5000 m	14:35.29 CR, NR
2024	European Championships	Rome, Italy	1st	10,000 m	30:51.32 NR
2024	Olympic Games	Paris, France	4th	5000 m	14:31.64 NR
2024	Olympic Games	Paris, France	2nd	10000 m	30:43.35 NR
2025	European Running Championships	Leuven, Belgium	1st	10 km	31:10
2025	World Championships	Tokyo, Japan	3rd	5000 m	14:55.42
2025	World Championships	Tokyo, Japan	2nd	10000 m	30:38.23
2026	World Indoor Championships	Toruń, Poland	1st	3000 m	8:57.64
2026	European Championships	Birmingham, United Kingdom	1st	5000 m	15:37.84
2026	European Championships	Birmingham, United Kingdom	1st	10000 m	31:41.17

=== National titles ===
Battocletti has won 17 national championships at individual senior level.

- Italian Athletics Championships
  - 1500 metres: 2021, 2025, 2026 (3)
  - 5000 metres: 2018, 2020, 2023, 2024, 2025, 2026 (6)
  - 10,000 metres: 2023 (1)
- Italian 10 km road Championship
  - 10 km road: 2023 (1)
- Italian Cross Country Championships
  - Long course: 2021, 2022, 2023, 2024, 2025, 2026 (6)

== See also ==
- European Athlete of the Month
- Italian records in athletics
- Italian all-time lists – 5000 metres
- Italian all-time lists – 10,000 metres
