= Nozomi Tanaka =

Japanese long-distance runner

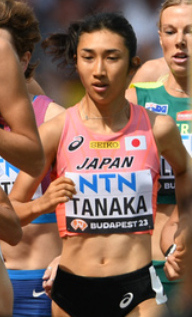
- Nozomi Tanaka in 2023

Personal information
- Born: 4 September 1999 (age 27) Ono, Hyōgo, Japan

Sport
- Country: Japan
- Sport: Track and field
- Events: Middle-distance, Long-distance

Achievements and titles
- Personal bests: 800 m: 2:02.18 (2026); 1500 m: 3:59.19 (2021) NR; 3000 m: 8:33.52 (2025) NR; 5000 m: 14:29.18 (2023) NR; 10,000 m: 30:54.40 (2025)
Medal record
Women's athletics
Representing Japan
Asian Indoor Athletics Championships
Gold medal – first place	2026 Tianjin	1500 m
Silver medal – second place	2026 Tianjin	3000 m
World U20 Championships
Gold medal – first place	2018 Tampere	3000 m
Asian Junior Championships
Gold medal – first place	2018 Gifu	3000 m
Asian Games
Silver medal – second place	2026 Aichi–Nagoya	10,000 m
Bronze medal – third place	2026 Aichi–Nagoya	1500 m

Nozomi Tanaka (田中 希実, Tanaka Nozomi; born 4 September 1999) is a Japanese track and field athlete who specializes in middle and long-distance running. She is the current Japanese record holder in the women's 1000 metres, 1500 metres, 3000 metres, and 5000 metres. She also holds the Asian Area records in many indoor events, such as the 1000 metres, 3000 metres, and 5000 metres.

Tanaka represented Japan at the 2019 World Athletics Championships in the 5000 metres, and at the 2020 Tokyo Olympics, competing in the 1500 and 5000 m.

In November 2024, it was announced that she had signed up for the inaugural season of the Michael Johnson founded Grand Slam Track.

== Early life ==
Born in Ono, Hyōgo Prefecture on September 4, 1999, Tanaka was the child of two competitive runners. Her father, Katsutoshi, ran for a corporate team, while her mother, Chihiro, won the Hokkaido Marathon in 2003. Tanaka is coached by her father.

Tanaka first began running at a young age in local non-competitive races, where she enjoyed running with her family. Her father also organized many events, which allowed her to become even closer to the sport. She eventually won her first road race in her fifth year of elementary schooling. In sixth grade, her mother participated in an Australian marathon, where Tanaka won in the kids' division. Winning overseas ignited her competitive spirit and love for running.

== Early career ==
During her high school years, Tanaka began to make a name for herself in middle and long-distance running. At the age of 16, she competed in the 3000 meters at the 2016 World U20 Championships in Athletics in Bydgoszcz, Poland, finishing eighth with a time of 9:01.16. The next year, she placed fourth in the 1500 meters at the 2017 Asian Athletics Championships as the youngest in the entire field, clocking 4:20.43

In 2018, Tanaka continued to develop as an athlete. She dominated the 3000 meters at the Asian U20 Championships in Gifu, Japan, beating the rest of the field by nearly 10 seconds with a time of 9:04.36. Later that year, she took home the gold medal in the 3000 meters at the World U20 Championships in Tampere, Finland, setting a personal best of 8:54.01. This performance caught the attention of New Balance, who would later become her sponsor.

== Senior career ==
Following her U20 world title in 2018, Tanaka became Japan’s top middle and long distance runner. She won the Japanese national title in the 1500 m in 2020, 2021, 2022, and 2023. She also won the Japanese national 5000 m in 2020, 2022, and 2023. At the 2020 Tokyo Summer Olympics, Tanaka reached the final of the 1500 m, becoming the first Japanese women to do so, and doing it in front of her home crowd. Her semifinal time of 3:59.19 also broke the Japanese record.

In the coming years Tanaka would continue to set numerous national records for Japan, including the 5000 m in 2023, the 2000 m in 2024, and the 3000 m in 2025. She also competed in the 800 m, 1500 m, and 5000 m at the 2022 World Championships in Oregon, becoming the first Japanese athlete to do so. As of November 2025, she now holds a total of 13 Japanese records.

== Competition record ==
Year	Competition	Venue	Position	Event	Notes
Major international competitions
2021	Olympic Games	Tokyo, Japan	16th (h)	5000 m	14:59.93 PB
2021	Olympic Games	Tokyo, Japan	8th	1,500 m	3:59.95 (PB h)
2019	World Cross Country Championships	Aarhus, Denmark	39th	10 km	39:27
2019	World Championships	Doha, Qatar	14th	5000 m	15:00.01 PB
2018	World U20 Championships	Tampere, Finland	1st	3000 m	8:54.01 PB
2018	Asian U20 Championships	Gifu, Japan	1st	3000 m	9:04.36 CR
2017	DécaNation	Paris, France	3rd	2000 m	5:53.47
2017	Asian Championships	Bhubaneswar, India	4th	1500 m	4:20.43
2016	World U20 Championships	Bydgoszcz, Poland	8th	3000 m	9:01.16 PB

=== Circuit performances ===
Grand Slam Track results
Slam	Race group	Event	Pl.	Time	Prize money
2025 Kingston Slam	Long distance	3000 m	7th	8:49.10	US$10,000
2025 Kingston Slam	Long distance	5000 m	7th	15:31.93	US$10,000
2025 Miami Slam	Long distance	5000 m	7th	15:06.78	US$12,500
2025 Miami Slam	Long distance	3000 m	8th	8:44.51	US$12,500
2025 Philadelphia Slam	Long distance	3000 m	7th	8:51.64	US$6,250

=== National titles ===
- Japan Championships in Athletics
  - 1500 metres: 2020, 2021, 2022, 2023
  - 5000 metres: 2020, 2022, 2023
