= Sorcha Nic Dhómhnaill =

Irish athlete (born 1990)

Personal information
- Nationality: Ireland
- Born: 27 February 1990 (age 36)

Sport
- Sport: Athletics
- Events: Long-distance running, Cross-country
Medal record
Women's athletics
Representing Ireland
European 10,000m Cup
Silver medal – second place	2026 La Spezia	Team race

Sorcha Nic Dhómhnaill (born 27 February 1990) is an Irish long-distance runner. In 2026, she won the silver medal with the Ireland women's team at the European 10,000m Cup.

== Biography ==
From Newcastle West in County Limerick, she runs as a member of Limerick Country Club AC, also training with Dublin Track Club.

In May 2026, she ran a course record 71:25 to win the Dublin City Half Marathon, breaking the previous course record by over six and-a-half minutes. Running alongside Niamh Allen and Fiona Everard later that month, she won the silver medal in the team event at the 2026 European 10,000m Cup, placing 20th overall in the individual race in La Spezia, Italy. Later that month, she was runner-up to Chaltu Dida at the Dublin Women's Mini Marathon, running 32:44.

== Personal life ==
Her twin sister Ide Nic Dhómhnaill is also a long-distance runner. Latterly based in Dublin, alongside her running, she has worked as a school teacher and is a mother, giving birth to a daughter, Siún, in April 2025.
