= Simon Bédard =

French athlete

Personal information
- Born: 3 January 1997 (age 29) Vannes

Sport
- Country: France
- Sport: Athletics
- Events: 1500 metres, 5000 metres

Achievements and titles
- Personal bests: 1500 m: 3:37.83 (2026); 5000 m: 13:15.46 (2024); 10000 m: 27:42.72 (2024)
Medal record
Men's athletics
Representing France
European 10,000m Cup
Silver medal – second place	2026 La Spezia	10,000 m
European Cross Country Championships
Silver medal – second place	2024 Antalya	Mixed relay
Summer World University Games
Gold medal – first place	2021 Chengdu	5000 m

Simon Bédard (born 3 January 1997) is a French track and field athlete.

He won a gold medal in the 5000 metres at the 2021 Summer World University Games. He is studying at the Butler University.

In December 2024, he won a silver medal with the French mixed relay team at the 2024 European Cross Country Championships in Antalya, Turkey. In May 2026, he won the silver medal in the individual race and team gold for France at the European 10,000m Cup in La Spezia, Italy.
