= 2022 Dutch Athletics Championships =

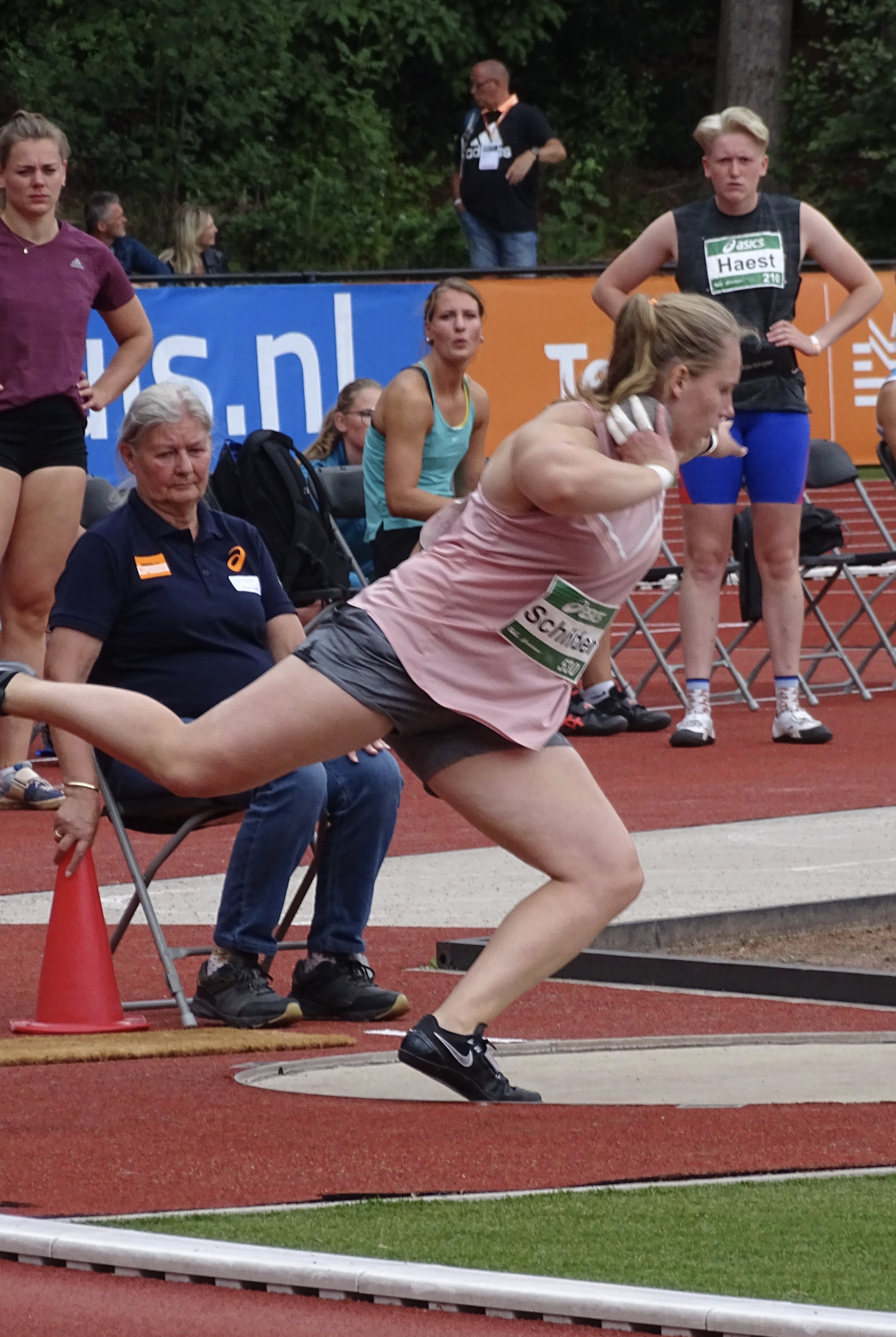
- Jessica Schilder competing in the shot put
- Dates: 24–26 June 2022
- Host city: Apeldoorn, Netherlands
- Venue: Sportpark Orderbos

The 2022 Dutch Athletics Championships was the national championship in outdoor track and field for the Netherlands. It was held 24–26 June 2022 at the Sportpark Orderbos in Apeldoorn. It was organised by local organisation AV'34 and the Royal Dutch Athletics Federation. The competition was held before the public again, following closed events in 2020 and 2021 due to the COVID-19 pandemic. The 10,000 metres races were held separately at the Golden Spike Leiden meet on 11 June.

Shot putter Jessica Schilder won the women's shot put with a Dutch national record mark of 19.68 m.

== Results ==
=== Men ===
Event	Gold		Silver		Bronze	
100 metres Wind: +0.2 m/s	Raphael Bouju	10.27	Joris van Gool	10.30	Hensley Paulina	10.39
200 metres Wind: -0.5 m/s	Mustafa Mahamuud	20.90	Taymir Burnet	21.03	Onyema Adigida	21.14
400 metres	Liemarvin Bonevacia	45.34	Isayah Boers	46.02	Ramsey Angela	46.44
800 metres	Djoao Lobles	1:48.04	Maarten Plaum	1:48.16	Rick van Riel	1:48.24
1500 metres	Noah Baltus	3:41.90	Robin van Riel	3:42.35	Tim Verbaandert	3:42.60
5000 metres	Richard Douma	14:03.04	Abdirahman Mohamed	14:04.27	Filmon Tesfu	14:07.18
10,000 metres	Stan Niesten	28:50.62	Frank Futselaar	29:18.78	Filmon Tesfu	29:23.87
110 m hurdles Wind: +0.4 m/s	Timme Koster	13.80	Mark Heiden	13.91	Koen Smet	13.92
400 m hurdles	Nick Smidt	49.43	Binne Brok	51.70	Martin Meijer	52.26
3000 m s'chase	Tsega Kifle	9:10.93	Ahmed Abubakar	9:12.51	Thom Reynders	9:16.63
Long jump	Fabian Blondina	7.62 m (+3.3 m/s)	Jeff Tesselaar	7.54 m (+0.9 m/s)	David Cairo	7.39 m (+1.0 m/s)
Triple jump	Baboucar Sallah Mohammed	15.27 m (-0.8 m/s)	Daan Hoomoedt	15.05 m (+0.9 m/s)	Roy van Zijl	14.70 m (+1.3 m/s)
High jump	Douwe Amels	2.16 m	Jamie Sesay	2.05 m	Wuill Vrolijk	2.05 m
Pole vault	Rutger Koppelaar	5.50 m	Koen van der Wijst	5.50 m	Paulo Benavides	5.30 m
Shot put	Sven Poelmann	19.46 m	Ruben Rolvink	17.02 m	Bjorn van Kins	16.11 m
Discus throw	Ruben Rolvink	62.79 m	Shaquille Emanuelson	60.38 m	Sebastiaan Bonte	55.67 m
Javelin throw	Thomas van Ophem	73.15 m	Tom Egbers	70.36 m	Thomas Knoop	68.89 m
Hammer throw	Etiènne Orbons	61.68 m	Dennis Hemelaar	59.00 m	Luuk Vos	58.31 m
Decathlon	Sven Roosen	8020 pts	Sven Jansons	7627 pts	Owen Beuckens	7271 pts

=== Women ===
Event	Gold		Silver		Bronze	
100 metres Wind: -0.1 m/s	Dafne Schippers	11.29	Zoë Sedney	11.32	Naomi Sedney	11.36
200 metres Wind: -0.9 m/s	Lieke Klaver	22.74	Femke Bol	23.05	Jamile Samuel	23.24
400 metres	Hanneke Oosterwegel	53.52	Andrea Bouma	53.61	Anne van de Wiel	54.08
800 metres	Anne Knijnenburg	2:09.86	Marissa Damink	2:10.08	Celine van Heerikhuize	2:10.33
1500 metres	Maureen Koster	4:12.32	Ineke van Koldam	4:14.56	Dagmar Smid	4:16.80
5000 metres	Diane van Es	15:48.38	Marcella Herzog	16:12.39	Jennifer Gulikers	16:17.89
10,000 metres	Marcella Herzog	32:47.94	Silke Jonkman	33:05.38	Jennifer Gulikers	34:24.06
100 m hurdles Wind: +0.0 m/s	Nadine Visser	12.77	Zoë Sedney	13.09	Eefje Boons	13.47
400 m hurdles	Cathelijn Peeters	56.51	Femke Frijters	60.34	Lianne Holtermann	61.15
3000 m s'chase	Veerle Bakker	9:59.35	Fanke Heinst	10:14.74	Marije Hijman	10:26.30
Long jump	Pauline Hondema	6.16 m (+0.6 m/s)	Maureen Herremans	6.11 m (+0.6 m/s)	Tara Yoro	6.07 m (+0.9 m/s)
Triple jump	Daniëlle Spek	12.66 m (+1.0 m/s)	Sica Verwasch	12.36 m (+0.8 m/s)	Louise Taatgen	12.15 m (+1.0 m/s)
High jump	Britt Weerman	1.83 m	Glenka Antonia	1.78 m	Tanita Hofmans	1.78 m
Pole vault	Femke Pluim	4.25 m	Killiana Heijmans	4.05 m	Marijke Wijnmaalen	4.05 m
Shot put	Jessica Schilder	19.68 m	Benthe König	17.81 m	Alida van Daalen	16.01 m
Discus throw	Alida van Daalen	54.15 m	Corinne Nugter	53.01 m	Danara Stoppels	47.76 m
Javelin throw	Danien ten Berge	52.38 m	Dewi Lafontaine	50.07 m	Sietske Verkade	49.67 m
Hammer throw	Audrey Jacobs	60.90 m	Sina Mai Holthuijsen	57.55 m	Lotte Smink	56.65 m
Heptathlon	Sofie Dokter	6144 pts	Myke van de Wiel	5798 pts	Sophia Mulder	5599 pts
