= 2016 IAAF World U20 Championships – Women's 3000 metres =

The women's 3000 metres event at the 2016 IAAF World U20 Championships was held at Zdzisław Krzyszkowiak Stadium on 20 July.

== Medalists ==
Gold	Beyenu Degefa; Ethiopia
Silver	Dalila Abdulkadir Gosa; Bahrain
Bronze	Konstanze Klosterhalfen; Germany

== Records ==
Standing records prior to the 2016 IAAF World U20 Championships in Athletics
World Junior Record	Zola Pieterse (GBR)	8:28.83	Rome, Italy	7 September 1985
Championship Record	Zhang Linli (CHN)	8:46.86	Seoul, South Korea	20 September 1992
World Junior Leading	Dalila Abdulkadir Gosa (BHR)	8:51.31	Ostrava, Czech Republic	20 May 2016

== Results ==
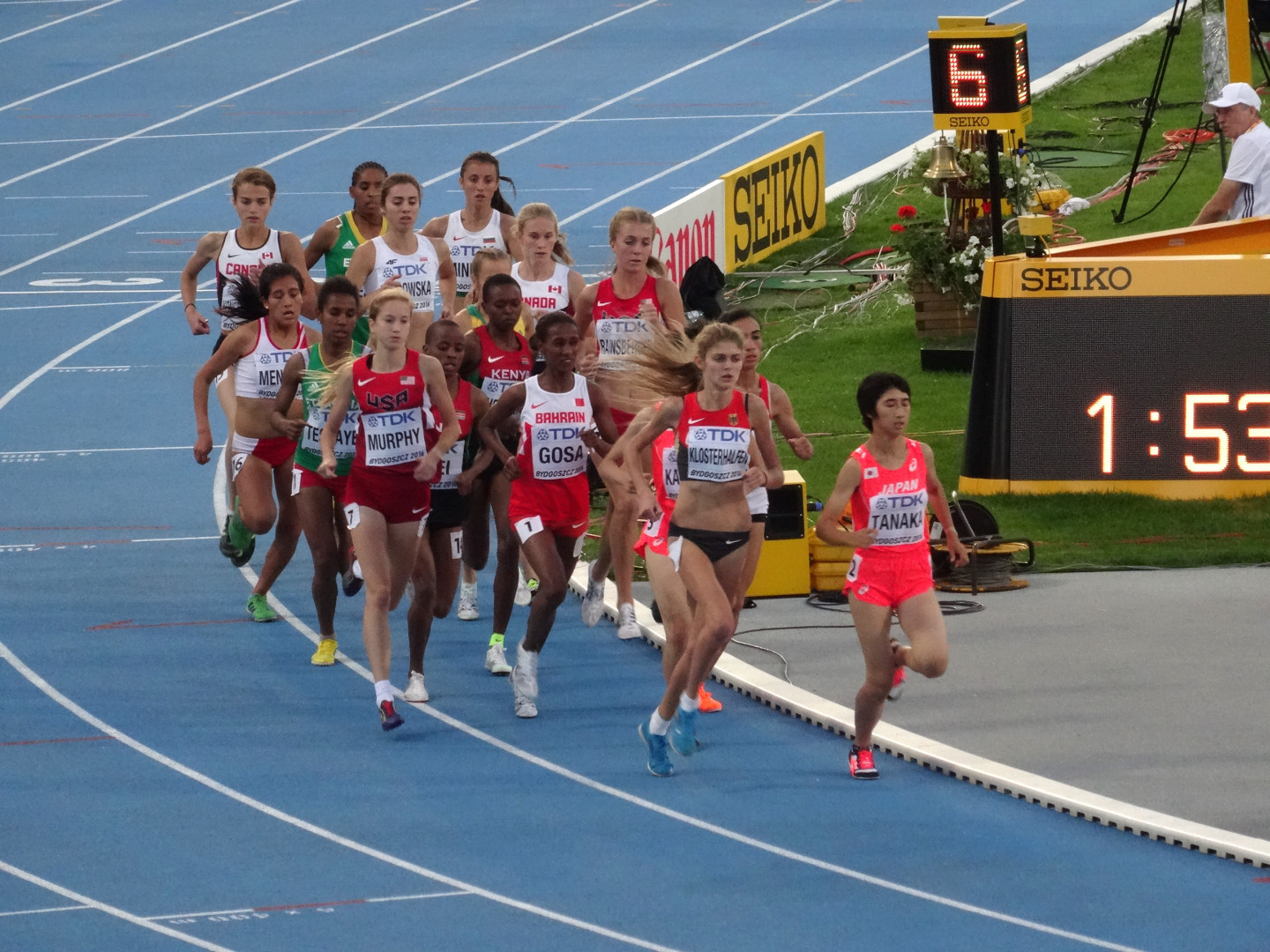
The race underway

Rank	Name	Nationality	Time	Note
1st place, gold medalist(s)	Beyenu Degefa	Ethiopia	8:41.76	CR
2nd place, silver medalist(s)	Dalila Abdulkadir Gosa	Bahrain	8:46.42	
3rd place, bronze medalist(s)	Konstanze Klosterhalfen	Germany	8:46.74	
4	Fotyen Tesfay	Ethiopia	8:47.46	
5	Sandrafelis Chebet Tuei	Kenya	8:55.77	PB
6	Sheila Chelangat	Kenya	8:59.89	PB
7	Katie Rainsberger	United States	9:00.62	PB
8	Nozomi Tanaka	Japan	9:01.16	PB
9	Wakana Kabasawa	Japan	9:10.20	
10	Fatma Arık	Turkey	9:13.27	PB
11	Shona McCulloch	Canada	9:16.93	PB
12	Kate Murphy	United States	9:17.01	
13	Lauren Ryan	Australia	9:21.21	PB
14	Christiane Konstantopoulos	Canada	9:29.21	PB
15	Dilyana Minkina	Bulgaria	9:30.80	PB
16	Saida Meneses	Peru	9:36.79	
17	Agnieszka Filipowska	Poland	10:12.75	
