= Athletics at the 2020 Summer Olympics – Women's 5000 metres =

Women's 5000 metres at the Games of the XXXII Olympiad
- Olympic Athletics
- Venue: Japan National Stadium
- Dates: 30 July 2021 (heats); 2 August 2021 (final)
- Competitors: 38 from 21 nations
- Winning time: 14:36.79

Medalists
1st place, gold medalist(s)		Sifan Hassan	Netherlands
2nd place, silver medalist(s)		Hellen Obiri	Kenya
3rd place, bronze medalist(s)		Gudaf Tsegay	Ethiopia

The women's 5000 metres event at the 2020 Summer Olympics took place on 30 July and 2 August 2021 at the Japan National Stadium. Approximately 45 athletes competed; the exact number was dependent on how many nations use universality places to enter athletes in addition to the 42 qualifying through time or ranking (1 universality place was used in 2016).

== Summary ==
Sifan Hassan had already announced her intention to attempt to win the 1500, 5000, and 10,000 metres triple at the Olympics. Prior to the Olympics, she had won the 1500 and 10,000 metres at the World Championships. Vivian Cheruiyot of Kenya had won the previous 5000 metres at the 2016 Olympics, but did not compete in the 2020 Olympics. Hellen Obiri, also of Kenya, was second in Rio and had won the 5000 metres at the 2019 World Championships

Earlier in the day, during the qualifying heat for the 1500 metres, Hassan suffered a fall but was able to continue, winning her heat to qualify for the semi-finals. The race started off slowly, with Elise Cranny taking an early lead as Hassan dropped to the back of the pack. Wanting a faster pace, Ririka Hironaka ran around the pack and assumed the lead. Over the next three laps, the pack let Hironaka breakaway to as much as a 10 metre lead. Then the Kenyan trio of Hellen Obiri, Agnes Jebet Tirop, and Lilian Kasait Rengeruk; the Ethiopian trio of Gudaf Tsegay, Senbere Teferi, and Ejgayehu Taye; and Kenyan-born Turkish athlete Yasemin Can moved forward.

With three laps to go, the lead group accelerated, with Hassan moving up from her position at the rear of the race to the back of the lead group. With Rengeruk falling off, the lead group consisted of the three Ethiopians, two Kenyans, Can, and Hassan. On the penultimate lap, Hassan moved up a further two positions, as Can and Teferi could not match the pace of the lead group All the leaders strived to be first at the bell, going four wide across the track, followed by Hassan.

At the start of the final lap Hassan moved to the outside, and began increasing her pace to pass the runners in front of her; Tirop, Taye, and Tsegay were passed during the turn, and finally mid-backstretch she passed the leader Obiri who went into full sprint to try to hold her off. It didn't match Hassan's speed, and Hassan carried the lead going into the final turn. Coming out of the final turn, Hassan accelerated again, opening up a 12 metre gap down the final straight, winning gold with a time 14:36.79. Obiri finished second some 1.57 seconds behind; 14:38.36, Tsegay completed the podium in third finishing in 14:38.87. It was Obiri's second straight silver.

== Background ==
This was the seventh time the event was held, having appeared at every Olympics since 1996.

== Qualification ==
A National Olympic Committee (NOC) could enter up to 3 qualified athletes in the women's 5000 metres event if all athletes meet the entry standard or qualify by ranking during the qualifying period. (The limit of 3 has been in place since the 1930 Olympic Congress.) The qualifying standard is 15:10.00. This standard was "set for the sole purpose of qualifying athletes with exceptional performances unable to qualify through the IAAF World Rankings pathway." The world rankings, based on the average of the best five results for the athlete over the qualifying period and weighted by the importance of the meet, will then be used to qualify athletes until the cap of 42 is reached.

The qualifying period was originally from 1 May 2019 to 29 June 2020. Due to the COVID-19 pandemic, the period was suspended from 6 April 2020 to 30 November 2020, with the end date extended to 29 June 2021. The world rankings period start date was also changed from 1 May 2019 to 30 June 2020; athletes who had met the qualifying standard during that time were still qualified, but those using world rankings would not be able to count performances during that time. The qualifying time standards could be obtained in various meets during the given period that have the approval of the IAAF. Both indoor and outdoor meets were eligible for qualifying. The most recent Area Championships may be counted in the ranking, even if not during the qualifying period.

NOCs can also use their universality place—each NOC can enter one female athlete regardless of time if they had no female athletes meeting the entry standard for an athletics event—in the 5000 metres.

== Competition format ==
The event continued to use the two-round format introduced in 2012.

== Records ==
Prior to this competition, the existing global and area records were as follows.

World record	Letesenbet Gidey (ETH)	14:06.62	Valencia, Spain	7 October 2020
Olympic record	Vivian Cheruiyot (KEN)	14:26.17	Rio de Janeiro, Brazil	19 August 2016
World Leading	Gudaf Tsegay (ETH)	14:13.32	Hengelo, Netherlands	8 June 2021

Area
Area	Time (s)	Athlete	Nation
Africa (records)	14:06.62 WR	Letesenbet Gidey	Ethiopia
Asia (records)	14:28.09	Jiang Bo	China
Europe (records)	14:22.12	Sifan Hassan	Netherlands
North, Central America and Caribbean (records)	14:23.92	Shelby Houlihan	United States
Oceania (records)	14:39.89	Kim Smith	New Zealand
South America (records)	15:18.85	Simone Alves da Silva	Brazil

The following national records were established during the competition:

Nation	Athlete	Round	Time	Notes
Israel	Selamawit Teferi	Round 1	14:53.43	
Mexico	Laura Galván	Round 1	15:00.16	
Japan	Ririka Hironaka	Final	14:52.84	

== Schedule ==
All times are Japan Standard Time (UTC+9)

The women's 5000 metres took place over two separate days.

Date	Time	Round
Friday, 30 July 2021	19:00	Round 1
Monday, 2 August 2021	19:00	Final

== Results ==
=== Round 1 ===
Qualification Rules: First 5 in each heat (Q) and the next 5 fastest (q) advance to the Final.

==== Heat 1 ====
Rank	Athlete	Nation	Time	Notes
1	Sifan Hassan	Netherlands	14:47.89	Q
2	Agnes Jebet Tirop	Kenya	14:48.01	Q, SB
3	Senbere Teferi	Ethiopia	14:48.31	Q
4	Ejgayehu Taye	Ethiopia	14:48.52	Q
5	Lilian Kasait Rengeruk	Kenya	14:50.36	Q, SB
6	Yasemin Can	Turkey	14:50.92	q
7	Karissa Schweizer	United States	14:51.34	q, SB
8	Selamawit Teferi	Israel	14:53.43	q, NR
9	Ririka Hironaka	Japan	14:55.87	q, PB
10	Andrea Seccafien	Canada	14:59.55	q
11	Laura Galván	Mexico	15:00.16	NR
12	Kaede Hagitani	Japan	15:04.95	PB
13	Jessica Judd	Great Britain	15:09.47	
14	Camille Buscomb	New Zealand	15:24.39	
15	Prisca Chesang	Uganda	15:25.72	
16	Lucía Rodríguez	Spain	15:26.19	PB
17	Julie-Anne Staehli	Canada	15:33.39	
18	Rose Davies	Australia	15:50.07	
19	Sarah Chelangat	Uganda	15:59.40	SB

==== Heat 2 ====
Rank	Athlete	Nation	Time	Notes
1	Gudaf Tsegay	Ethiopia	14:55.74	Q
2	Hellen Obiri	Kenya	14:55.77	Q
3	Nadia Battocletti	Italy	14:55.83	Q, PB
4	Elise Cranny	United States	14:56.14	Q, SB
5	Karoline Bjerkeli Grovdal	Norway	14:56.82	Q
6	Nozomi Tanaka	Japan	14:59.93	PB
7	Rachel Schneider	United States	15:00.07	
8	Rahel Daniel	Eritrea	15:02.59	
9	Amy-Eloise Markovc	Great Britain	15:03.22	PB
10	Eilish McColgan	Great Britain	15:09.68	
11	Jenny Blundell	Australia	15:11.27	
12	Esther Chebet	Uganda	15:11.47	
13	Dominique Scott	South Africa	15:13.94	SB
14	Kate van Buskirk	Canada	15:14.96	
15	Isobel Batt-Doyle	Australia	15:21.65	
16	Diane van Es	Netherlands	15:47.01	
17	Marthe Yankurije	Rwanda	15:55.94	SB
–	Francine Niyonsaba	Burundi	DQ	TR 17.3.2
–	Klara Lukan	Slovenia	DNF	

=== Final ===
Rank	Athlete	Nation	Time	Notes
1st place, gold medalist(s)	Sifan Hassan	Netherlands	14:36.79	
2nd place, silver medalist(s)	Hellen Obiri	Kenya	14:38.36	
3rd place, bronze medalist(s)	Gudaf Tsegay	Ethiopia	14:38.87	
4	Agnes Jebet Tirop	Kenya	14:39.62	SB
5	Ejgayehu Taye	Ethiopia	14:41.24	
6	Senbere Teferi	Ethiopia	14:45.11	
7	Nadia Battocletti	Italy	14:46.29	PB
8	Yasemin Can	Turkey	14:46.49	
9	Ririka Hironaka	Japan	14:52.84	NR
10	Selamawit Teferi	Israel	14:54.39	
11	Karissa Schweizer	United States	14:55.80	
12	Lilian Kasait Rengeruk	Kenya	14:55.85	
13	Elise Cranny	United States	14:55.98	SB
14	Karoline Bjerkeli Grovdal	Norway	15:09.37	
15	Andrea Seccafien	Canada	15:12.09	
