= Niamh Allen =

Irish athlete

Personal information
- Nationality: Ireland
- Born: 19 April 1995 (age 31)

Sport
- Sport: Athletics
- Events: Long-distance running, Cross-country

Achievements and titles
- Personal bests: 3000m: 8:51.08 (Cork, 2025); 5000m: 15:35.90 (Dublin, 2025); Road; 10k: Road 32:25 (Brussels, 2025); Half Marathon: 1:12:44 (Sydney, 2023)
Medal record
Women's athletics
Representing Ireland
European 10,000m Cup
Silver medal – second place	2026 La Spezia	Team race

Niamh Allen (born 19 April 1995) is an Irish long-distance and cross country runner. She won the Irish national title over 5000 metres in 2025 and 2026, and represented Ireland at the 2024 and 2025 European Cross Country Championships, and the 2025 European Running Championships. In 2026, she won the silver medal with the Ireland women's team at the European 10,000m Cup.

== Biography ==
Allen is a member of Allen, Leevale AC, in County Cork. In November 2024, she finished second at the Irish national cross country championship, just twelfth weeks after giving birth. Allen was the top Irish finisher and she placed eleventh overall at the 2024 European Cross Country Championships in Antalya, Turkey, in December 2024.

In March 2025, Allen won the Irish national 1 km road title in 31:44, the fastest time ran by an Irish woman in Ireland. The following month, Allen represented Ireland at the 2025 European Running Championships in Belgium, placing eighteenth overall. In May, she won the Midleton five-mile road race, beating all the men as well as the women in a field of 340 runners. In July, she ran 8:51.08 for 3000 metres in Cork. Allen won the 5000m at the Irish Athletics Championships in August 2025. In September, she won the Cork Women's Mini Marathon.

Allen placed second again at the 2025 Irish National Cross Country Championships held in Derry on 23 November. Allen was selected to represent Ireland at the 2025 European Cross Country Championships in Lagoa, Portugal on 14 December, placing twenty-third overall.

Allen was selected for the 2026 World Athletics Cross Country Championships in Tallahassee, where she was the first Irish finisher in the women's race, placing 21st. In May 2026, she placed sixth in the individual race, running 32:15.79, and won the silver medal in the team event at the European 10,000m Cup in La Spezia, Italy, alongside Fiona Everard and Sorcha Nic Dhómhnaill. Later that month, she ran 32:14 to win the 10k race at the Analog Devices Cork City Marathon. On 26 July, Allen won the national title in the 5000 metres at the 2026 Irish Championships, finishing ahead of Fiona Everard. In August, she competed at the 2026 European Athletics Championships in Birmingham, England, in the 10,000 metres.

== Personal life ==
Allen attended University College Cork. She gave birth to a daughter, Lily, in 2024. She lives in Cork with her husband Will.
