= Diane van Es =

Dutch athlete

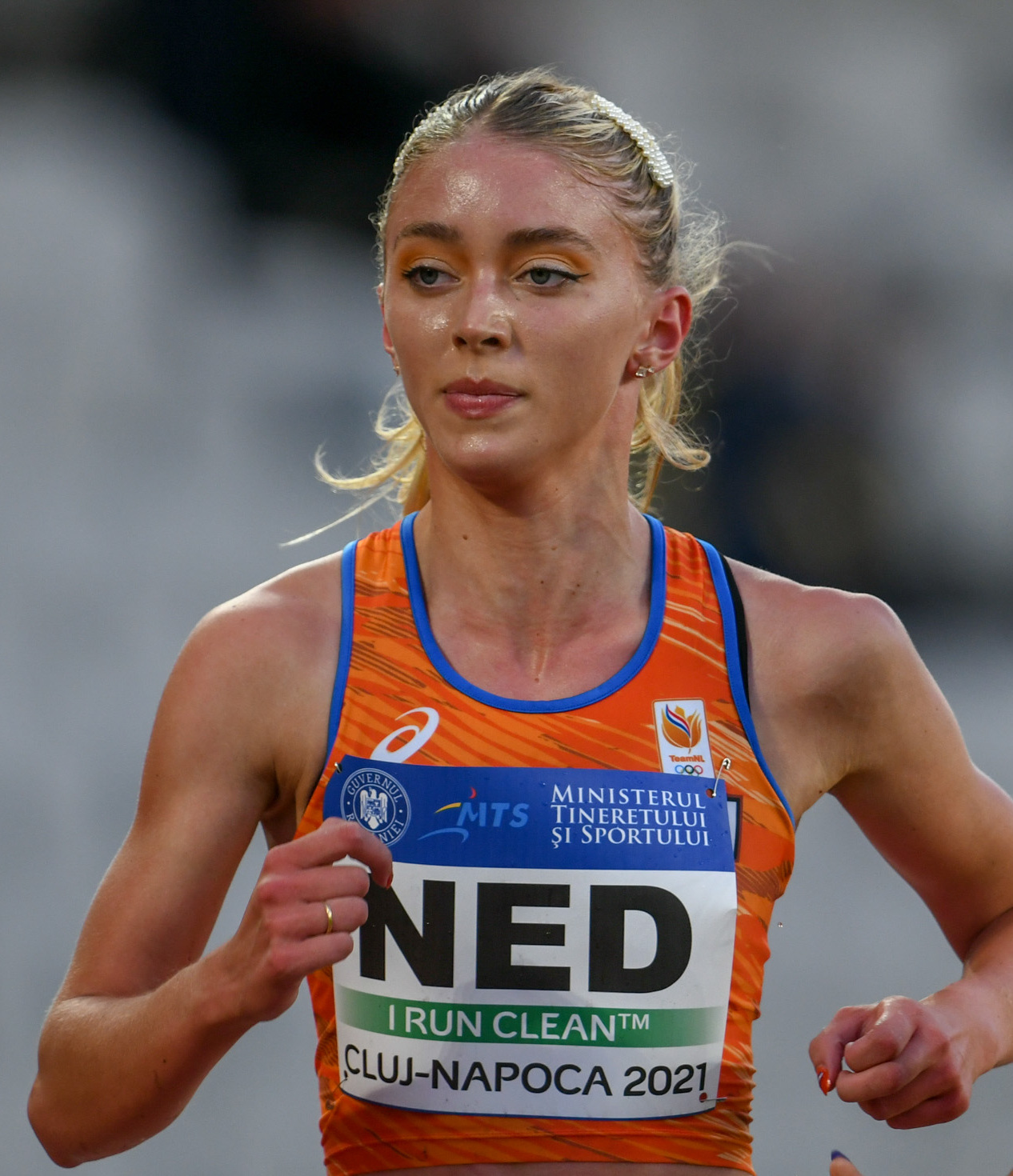
- Van Es at the 2021 European Team Championships in Cluj-Napoca

Personal information
- Full name: Diane Gabriëlla van Es
- Born: 22 March 1999 (age 27) Rotterdam, Netherlands
- Height: 1.70 m (5 ft 7 in)

Sport
- Country: Netherlands
- Sport: Athletics
- Events: Middle-, Long-distance running
Medal record
Women's athletics
Representing the Netherlands
European Championships
Silver medal – second place	2024 Rome	10,000 m
European U23 Championships
Bronze medal – third place	2021 Bergen	5000 m
European Youth Olympic Festival
Gold medal – first place	2015 Tbilisi	3000 m
European Cross Country Championships
Gold medal – first place	2019 Lisbon	U23 team
Silver medal – second place	2018 Tilburg	U20 team

Diane Gabriëlla van Es (pronounced [diˈjaːnə ɣaːbriˈɛlaː vɑn ˈɛs]; born 22 March 1999) is a Dutch middle- and long-distance runner. She won the silver medal in the 10,000 metres at the 2024 European Championships and the bronze medal in the 5000 metres at the 2021 European Under-23 Championships.

Van Es is the former holder of the European record in the 5 kilometres road with a time of 14:39 minutes set on 9 February 2025 and the current holder of the Dutch record in the 10 kilometres road with a time of 30:29 minutes set on 12 February 2023. She won four national titles (5000 m, 10 km).

== Career ==
Diane van Es competed internationally at youth level, winning the 3000 metres at the 2015 European Youth Olympic Festival held in Tbilisi, and placing 12th in that event at the 2017 European Under-20 Championships in Grosseto two years later.

In 2019, she represented Netherlands in the 5000 metres final at the European U23 Championships held in Gävle and was part of the gold medal-winning women's U23 Dutch team at the European Cross Country Championships in Lisbon.

Van Es established herself in the senior ranks with a 5000 m win at the 2020 Dutch Athletics Championships.

On 29 May 2021, she set a 5000 m personal best of 15:07.52 during the Next Generation Athletics meeting in Nijmegen, which qualified her for the postponed 2020 Tokyo Olympics.

She won the silver medal in the 10,000 metres at the 2024 European Championships in Rome on 11 June 2024, running a personal best time of 30:57.24.

== Personal bests ==
All information from World Athletics profile.

Personal best times
Event	Time	Location	Date	Notes
1500 metres	4:02.79	Dublin, Ireland	11 July 2025	
1500 metres short track	4:11.67	Stockholm, Sweden	23 February 2025	
3000 metres	8:38.12	Rabat, Morocco	25 May 2025	
3000 metres short track	9:01.32	Apeldoorn, Netherlands	10 February 2021	
5000 metres	14:43.80	London, United Kingdom	18 July 2025	
5 kilometres road	14:33	Monaco	15 February 2026	NR
8 kilometres road	25:24	Apeldoorn, Netherlands	2 February 2020	
10,000 metres	30:57.24	Rome, Italy	11 June 2024	
10 kilometres road	30:29	Schoorl, Netherlands	12 February 2023	NR
15 kilometres road	47:51	Nijmegen, Netherlands	17 November 2024	
10 miles road	53:02	Zaandam, Netherlands	17 September 2023	
Half marathon	1:08:03	New York City, New York, United States	16 March 2025	

== Competition results ==
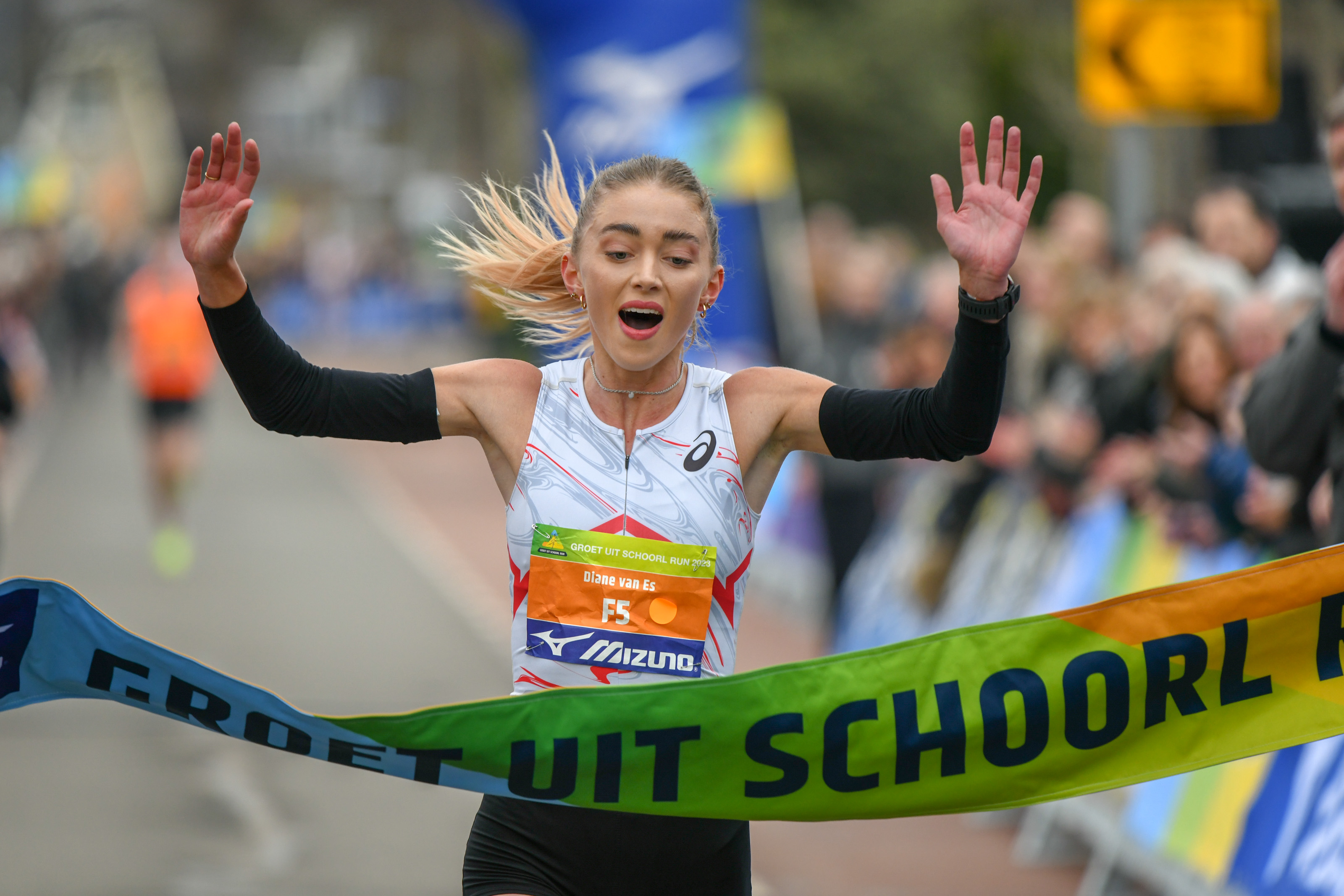
Diane van Es finished fourth at the 2023 New York City Half Marathon as the second non-African woman. Pictured at the 2023 Dutch 10 km Championships.

All information from World Athletics profile.

=== International competitions ===
Representing the Netherlands
Year	Competition	Venue	Position	Event	Result	Notes
2015	European Youth Olympic Festival	Tbilisi, Georgia	1st	3000 m	9:58.49	
2017	European U20 Championships	Grosseto, Italy	12th	3000 m	9:55.43	
2018	European Cross Country Championships	Tilburg, Netherlands	29th	U20 race	14:29	
2018	European Cross Country Championships	Tilburg, Netherlands	2nd	U20 team	28 pts	
2019	European U23 Championships	Gävle, Sweden	13th	5000 m	16:09.28	
2019	European Cross Country Championships	Lisbon, Portugal	11th	U23 race	21:53	
2019	European Cross Country Championships	Lisbon, Portugal	1st	U23 team	17 pts	
2021	European Team Championships First League	Cluj-Napoca, Romania	3rd	3000 m	9:07.41	PB
2021	European U23 Championships	Bergen, Norway	3rd	5000 m	15:48.4-	
2021	Olympic Games	Tokyo, Japan	33rd (h)	5000 m	15:47.01	
2021	European Cross Country Championships	Lisbon, Portugal	43rd	U23 race	22:25	
2022	European Championships	Munich, Germany	13th	5000 m	15:26.44	
2023	World Championships	Budapest, Hungary	13th	10,000 m	32:05.85	
2024	European Championships	Rome, Italy	2nd	10,000 m	30:57.24	PB
2024	Olympic Games	Paris, France	16th	10,000 m	31:25.51	
2025	World Championships	Tokyo, Japan	30th (h)	5000 m	15:12.57	
2026	European Championships	Birmingham, United Kingdom	–	10,000 m	DNF	

=== National titles ===
- Dutch Athletics Championships
  - 5000 metres: 2020, 2022, 2024
- Dutch 10 km Championships
  - 10 km: 2023
