= Fiona Everard =

Irish athlete

Personal information
- Nationality: Ireland
- Born: 30 November 1998 (age 27)

Sport
- Sport: Athletics
- Events: Cross-country, Long-distance running

Achievements and titles
- Personal bests: 1500m: 4:26.05 (Dublin, 2025); 3000m: 8:51.72 (Cork, 2026); 5000m: 15:30.34 (Dublin, 2026); 10000m: 32:41.28 (La Spezia, 2026)
Medal record
Women's athletics
Representing Ireland
European 10,000m Cup
Silver medal – second place	2026 La Spezia	Team race

Fiona Everard (born 30 September 1998) is an Irish cross country and long-distance runner. In 2023 and 2025 she won the Irish national cross country championship. In 2026, she won the silver medal with the Ireland women's team at the European 10,000m Cup.

== Biography ==
From Enniskeane in County Cork, Everard is a member of Cork-based running club Bandon AC, having joined the club at the age of seven years-old.

In December 2022, she won the National Novice Cross-Country Championship, held in Conna. Everard had not long started to receive the input of her coach Matt Lockett, with whom she began working in October 2022, and who she has since said helped her overcome a succession of bone injuries and stress fractures. In late 2022, she also finished in the top 10 at the 2022 National Senior Cross Country Championships held in Donegal.

In February 2023, she made her debut competing internationally for Ireland. She finished 14th at the Cross Cup de Hannut in Belgium, finishing one place and one second behind leading Irish woman on the day Fionnuala Ross. Representing the University of Galway, she won the IUAA cross-country event in Limerick in March 2023. The following month she won the Irish Universities Championship over 5000m in Dublin, in what was in only her second-ever 5000m on the track. She was subsequently named Cork City Sports Athlete of the month for April.

In October 2023, she finished runner-up to Lizzie Lee at the Cork County cross-country championships in Macroom. Everard won the 2023 Irish National Cross Country Championships in Gowran, Kilkenny in November 2023. She finished 37 seconds clear of the field, in a race competed in extreme muddy conditions. Everard credited her experience of conditions training in Bandon which have helped her to favour muddy and hilly courses. The win secured her a place on the Irish team for the 2023 European Cross Country Championships scheduled for December 10, 2023 in Brussels, in which she finished 34th overall. In March 2024, she was selected for the 2024 World Athletics Cross Country Championships in Serbia.

In May 2025, she ran 9:13.38 for the 3000 metres at the Belfast Milers event in Northern Ireland. Later that month, Ave ran a 15:49.79 personal best for the 5000 metres at the IFAM outdoor meet in Brussels, Belgium. In October, she won the Autumn Open International Cross Country Festival, a World Athletics Cross Country Tour Bronze meeting, in Dublin. She won the Irish National Cross Country Championships held in Derry on 23 November 2025. With the win, she secured automatic selection for a third successive European Cross Country Championships appearance, where she placed tenth in Lagoa, Portugal, in the senior women's race. Everard was subsequently selected for the 2026 World Athletics Cross Country Championships in Tallahassee, where she placed 22nd overall.

In April, she began to be coached by Mark Kenneally. In May, she ran as part of the Ireland team alongside Niamh Allen and Sorcha Nic Dhómhnaill as they won the silver medal in the team event at the European 10,000m Cup in La Spezia, Italy, running a personal best of 32:41.28 for a top-ten finish in the individual race. In July, she ran a new 3000 metres personal best of 8:51.72 at the Cork City Sports in Ireland. On 26 July, she placed second overall behind Niamh Allen in the 5000 metres at the 2026 Irish championships with a personal best of 15:30.34. In August, she competed at the 2026 European Athletics Championships in Birmingham, England, in the 10,000 metres. On 22 November, Everard won the Irish Cross Country Championships title for the third in four years.

== Personal life ==
In 2022, Everard began studying for a master's degree in Biomedical Science at the University of Galway.
