= Beyenu Degefa =

Ethiopian middle- and long-distance runner

Personal information
- Full name: Beyenu Degefa Begna
- Nationality: Ethiopian
- Born: 12 July 1999 (age 26)

Sport
- Sport: Athletics
- Event(s): 3000 metres, marathon

Achievements and titles
- Personal bests: 3000m: 8:35.76 (2018); MAR: 2:23:04 (2021)
Medal record
Women's athletics
Representing Ethiopia
World U20 Championships
Gold medal – first place	2016 Bydgoszcz	3000 m

Beyenu Degefa Begna (also spelled Beyenu Degefu; born 12 July 1999) is an Ethiopian middle-distance runner. She is the 2016 World Junior Champion in the 3000 metres and her time still stands as the championship record in that event.

== Biography ==
In 2016, Degefa began winning a series of cross country races. At the Cross de l'Acier, she bested teammate Fantu Worku and Olympic champion Peruth Chemutai to win by four seconds. The following year, Degefa won the Cinque Mulini race. She outkicked Kalkidan Fentie in the final stretch to win by four seconds again.

Degefa's first and only global medal came in 2016 at the World Athletics Under-20 Championships, where she won the 3000 metres in a championship record time of 8:41.76.

In 2021, Degefa made her debut at the marathon distance at the Valencia Marathon, finishing 3rd in 2:23:01. Her position was later moved up to 2nd after race winner Nancy Jelagat was suspended for an anti-doping rules violation.

== Statistics ==
=== Personal bests ===
Event	Mark	Competition	Venue	Date
3000 metres	8:35.76	Doha Diamond League	Doha, Qatar	4 May 2018
Marathon	2:23:04	Valencia Marathon	Valencia, Spain	5 December 2021
