= Mustafa Mahamuud =

Dutch-Somali sprinter

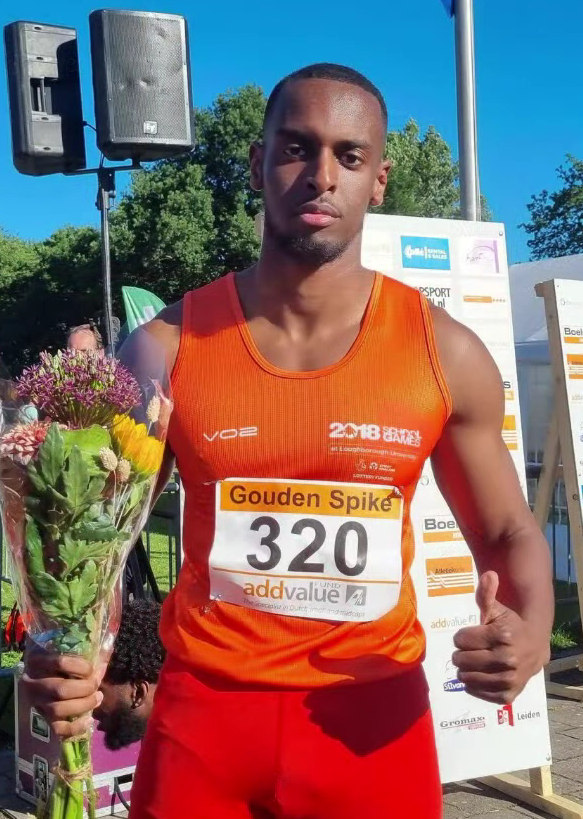
- Mustafa Mahamuud

Personal information
- Born: 1 July 1998 (age 28) Amsterdam, Netherlands
- Employer: New Balance
- Height: 1.83 m (6 ft 0 in)
- Weight: 80 kg (176 lb)

Sport
- Country: Netherlands, United Kingdom
- Sport: Athletics
- Events: 100 metres, 200 metres
- Club: Birchfield Harriers (Great Britain, United Kingdom)
- Coached by: self-help

Mustafa Mahamuud (born 1 July 1998 in Amsterdam) is a sprinter based in the Netherlands and the United Kingdom who is ethnically of Somali descent. and selected for the Netherlands team for the 2024 Olympic games.

He was the winner in the 200 metres in the 2022 Dutch Athletics Championships.

== Racing ==
Representing the Netherlands
Year	Competition	Venue	Position	Event	Notes
2022	Dutch Athletics Championships	Apeldoorn, Netherlands	1st	200 m	20.90

== Personal bests ==
Outdoor

- 100 metres – 10.38 (+1.7 m/s, Birmingham University Athletics Track, Birmingham (GBR) 2022)
- 200 metres – 20.63 (+0.9 m/s, Résisprint International, Stade de La Charrière, La Chaux-de-Fonds (SUI) 2022)

== Gallery ==
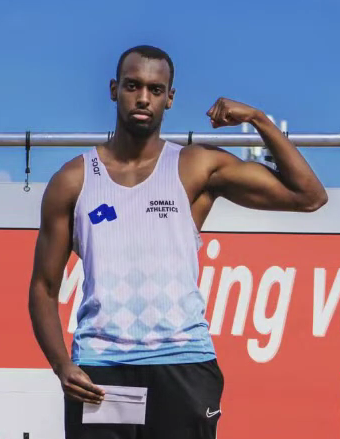

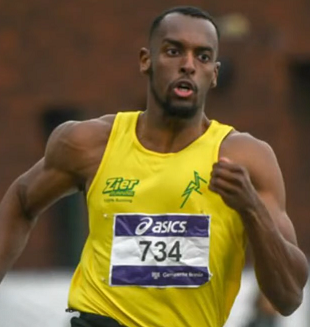
