= Carla Gallardo =

Spanish long-distance runner (born 1999)

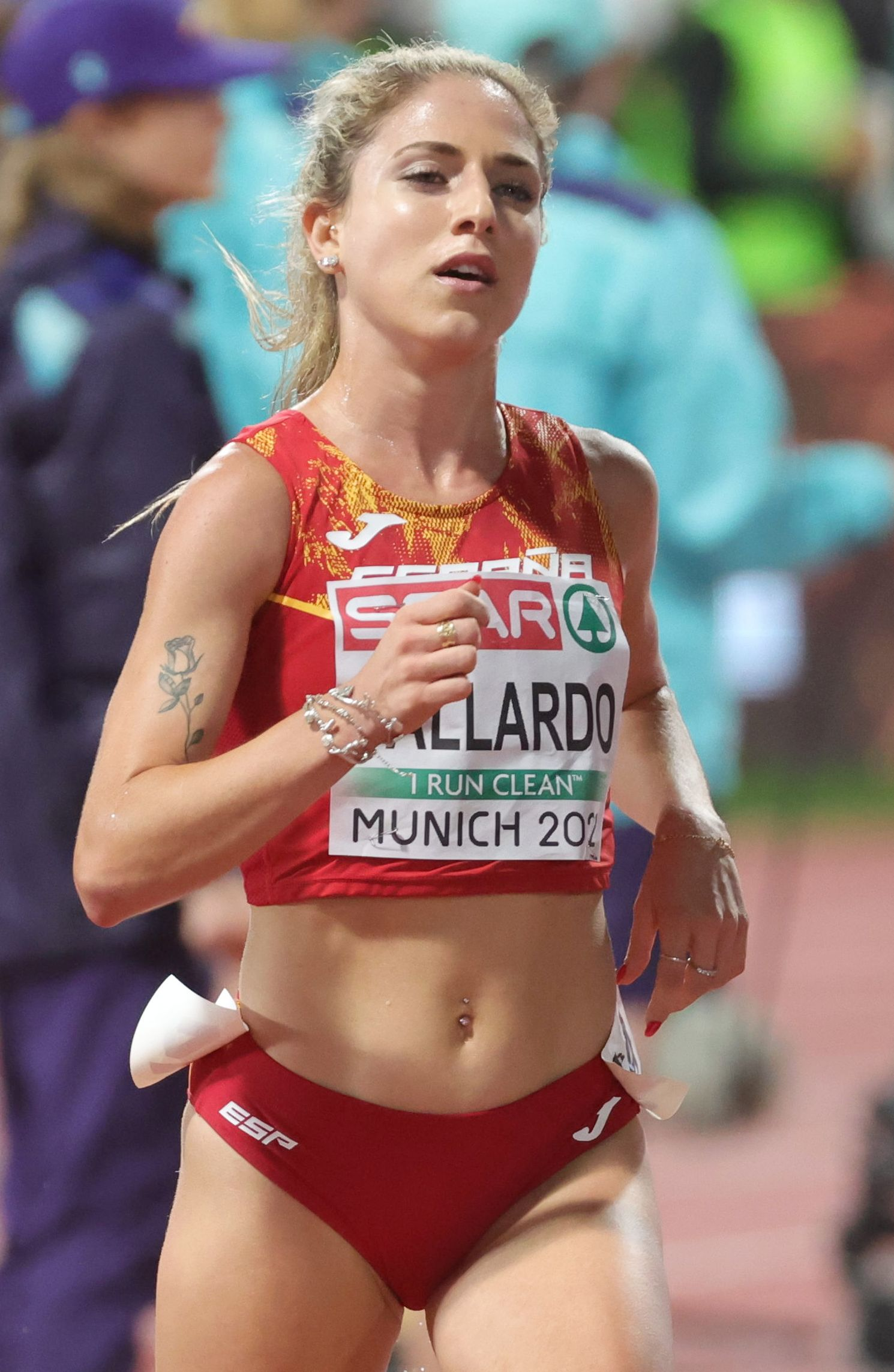
- Gallardo at the 2022 European Athletics Championships – Women's 5000 metres

Personal information
- Full name: Carla Gallardo Puertas
- Nationality: Spain
- Born: 9 February 1999 (age 27)
- Home town: Palencia

Sport
- Sport: Athletics
- Events: 5000 metres 3000 metres
- Coached by: Santiago de la Parte

Achievements and titles
- National finals: 2015 Spanish U18s; • 800m, 2nd (silver); 2016 Spanish Indoor U18s; • 1500m, 1st (gold); 2016 Spanish U18s; • 1500m, 1st (gold); 2017 Spanish Indoor U20s; • 3000m, 2nd (silver); 2017 Spanish U20 XC; • 6.15km XC, 3rd (bronze); 2017 Spanish U20s; • 3000m, 3rd (bronze); 2018 Spanish Indoor U20s; • 3000m, 1st (gold); 2018 Spanish U20 XC; • 6km XC, 1st (gold); 2018 Spanish Champs; • 1500m, 11th; 2019 Spanish Indoor U23s; • 3000m, 1st (gold); 2019 Spanish U23 XC; • 10.05km XC, 3rd (bronze); 2021 Spanish U23s; • 5000m, 3rd (bronze); 2021 Spanish Champs; • 5000m, 8th; 2022 Spanish XC; • 10.22km XC, 2nd (silver); 2022 Spanish Indoors; • 3000m, 2nd (silver); 2022 Spanish Champs; • 5000m, 7th
- Personal bests: Half Marathon: 1:08:30 (2026); 10 Km: 31:11 (2025); 5000m: 15:10.62 (2022); 3000m: 9:02.72sh (2022)
Medal record
Women's athletics
Representing Spain
European Cross Country Championships
Bronze medal – third place	2017 Šamorín	U20 team
- Updated on 1 January 2024

Carla Gallardo Puertas (born 9 February 1999) is a Spanish long-distance runner. She finished 7th at the 2018 IAAF World U20 Championships in the 3000 metres, and she contributed to the Spanish U20 team's bronze medal at the 2017 European Cross Country Championships.

== Biography ==
Gallardo is from Palencia, Spain and has studied to become a medical doctor in parallel with her athletics career.

At the 2017 IAAF World Cross Country Championships in the U20 women's race, Gallardo finished 71st. She won her first international medal later at the 2017 European Cross Country Championships U20 race, placing 19th and contributing to the Spanish team's bronze medal finish.

In her first global track final, Gallardo finished 7th at the 2018 IAAF World U20 Championships in the 3000 metres. Her time of 9:10.07 was the second-fastest ever ran by a Spanish U20 athlete. In December at the 2018 European Cross Country Championships, Gallardo finished 6th in the U20 race.

At the 2021 Spanish Athletics Championships, Gallardo finished 8th in 17:04.38, and was not selected for the Spanish 2021 Olympic team. Gallardo's next international championship was at the 2021 European Athletics U23 Championships, where she ran the 5000 m and placed 11th.

At the 2022 European Athletics Championships, Gallardo finished 16th in the 5000 m. She ran with an infection while taking antibiotics, and she injured both of her achilles tendons at the competition. The injury caused her to miss the 2023 indoor season, and Gallardo ran just one race outdoors.

Gallardo is coached by Santiago de la Parte, 1984 Olympian for Spain in the marathon.

== Statistics ==
=== Personal bests ===
Event	Mark	Place	Competition	Venue	Date	Ref
5000 metres	15:10.62	8th	Anniversary Games	Birmingham, United Kingdom	21 May 2022	
3000 metres	9:09.72 sh	8th	Meeting Elite en Salle de Miramas	Miramas, France	4 February 2022	
