= Alessia Zarbo =

French athlete (born 2001)

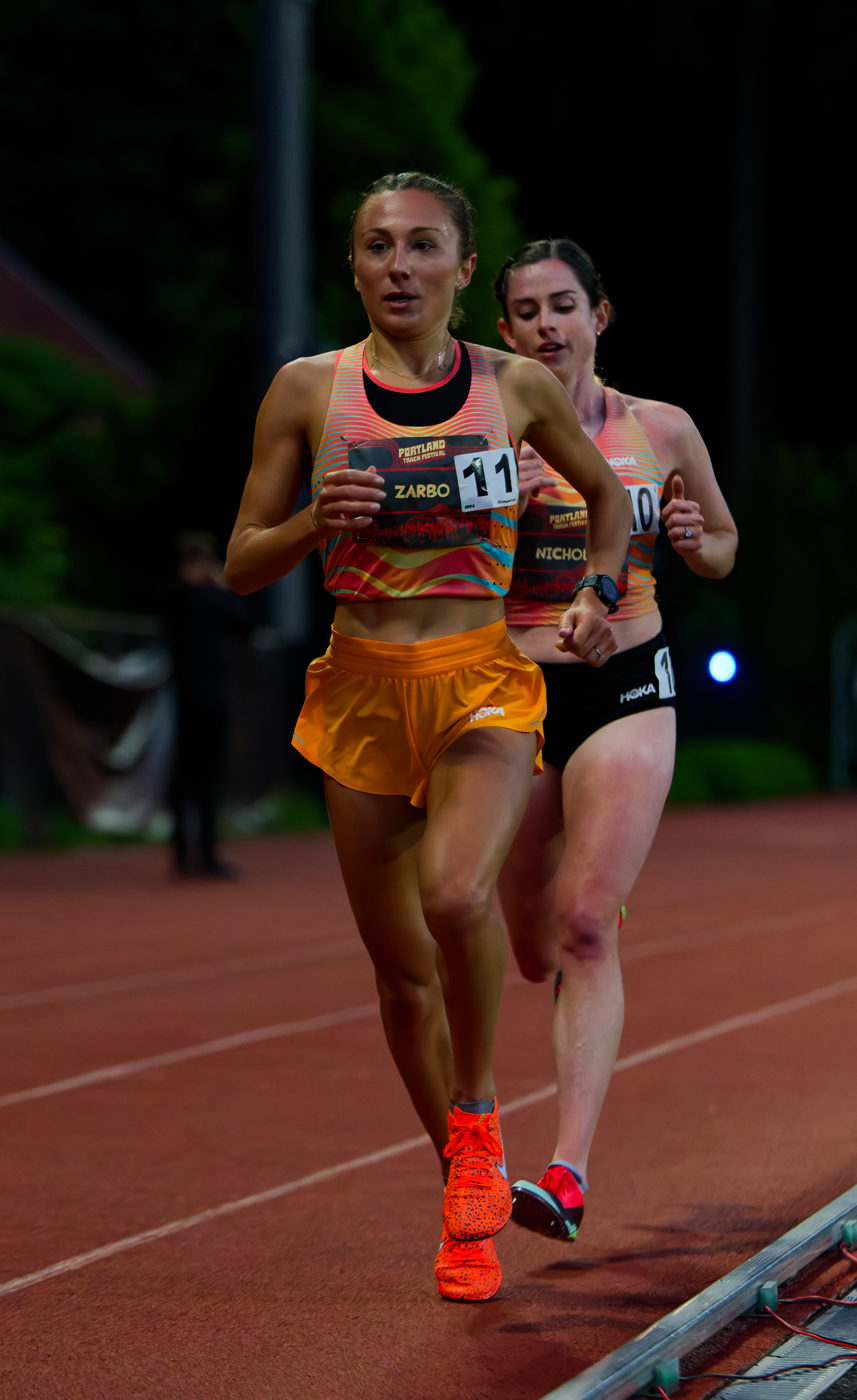
- Zarbo in 2025

Personal information
- Born: 11 September 2001 (age 25) Antibes, France
- Height: 157 cm (5 ft 2 in)
- Weight: 45 kg (99 lb)

Sport
- Country: France
- Sport: Athletics
- Events: Long distance running, Cross country running

Achievements and titles
- Personal bests: 10000m: 31:50:62 (Pacé, 2025); Road; 10 km: 31:00 NR (Valencia, 2025); Half Marathon: 1:08:20 NR (Prague, 2025)
Medal record
Women's athletics
Representing France
European 10,000m Cup
Silver medal – second place	2025 Pacé	10,000 m
Silver medal – second place	2026 La Spezia	10,000 m
European U18 Championships
Bronze medal – third place	2018 Győr	3000m
European Youth Olympic Festival
Gold medal – first place	2017 Győr	3000m
European Cross Country Championships
Bronze medal – third place	2025 Lagoa	Team

Alessia Zarbo (born 11 September 2001) is a French long distance and cross country runner. In 2020, she became French national champion over 10,000 metres.

== Biography ==
Zarbo was a gold medallist in the 3,000 metres at the 2017 European Youth Olympic Festival in Győr, Hungary. She was a bronze medallist in the same distance at the 2018 European Athletics U18 Championships in the same city with a personal best 9:25.25. She finished eighth in the 3000 metres at the 2018 Youth Olympic Games in Buenos Aires.

Zarbo became French national champion in the 5000 metres at the 2020 French Athletics Championships in Albi. She ran a personal best time for the 10,000 metres in May 2022 in Eugene, Oregon, United States, running a time of 32:28.57. She competed at the 2022 European Athletics Championships in the 10,000 metres in August 2022.

In April 2024, she qualified for the 10,000m event at the 2024 Paris Olympics, by finishing in 6th place in the world cross-country rankings. She competed in the 10,000 metres in Paris in August 2024 but did not finish the race.

In May 2025, she ran a personal best 31:50:62 and won the silver medal in the senior women’s race at the European 10,000m Cup in Pacé, France. She represented France at the 2025 European Athletics Team Championships First Division in June 2025. That year, Zarbo set new French national records on the roads at 10km (31:00) and the half marathon (68:20). In November 2025, she was runner-up at the Cross d'Allonnes, part of the World Athletics Cross Country Tour. She was selected for the 2025 European Cross Country Championships in Portugal in December 2025, helping France with Agathe Guillemot and Anaëlle Guillonnet to team bronze, their first medal in the senior women's race at the Championships since 2015.

On 4 January 2026, she placed second Jana Van Lent in 31:12 at the Prom Classic 10km in Nice, France. Later that year, she won the French 10,000m title and placed second in 31:56.18 behind Elżbieta Glinka of Poland at the European 10,000m Cup in Italy. In August, she competed at the 2026 European Athletics Championships in Birmingham, England, in the 10,000 metres.

== Personal life ==
From Antibes, she trains in Nice, France. Her brother Raffael Zarbo is a cyclist. She attended the University of Oregon.
