= Jennifer Gulikers =

Dutch long-distance runner (born 1994)

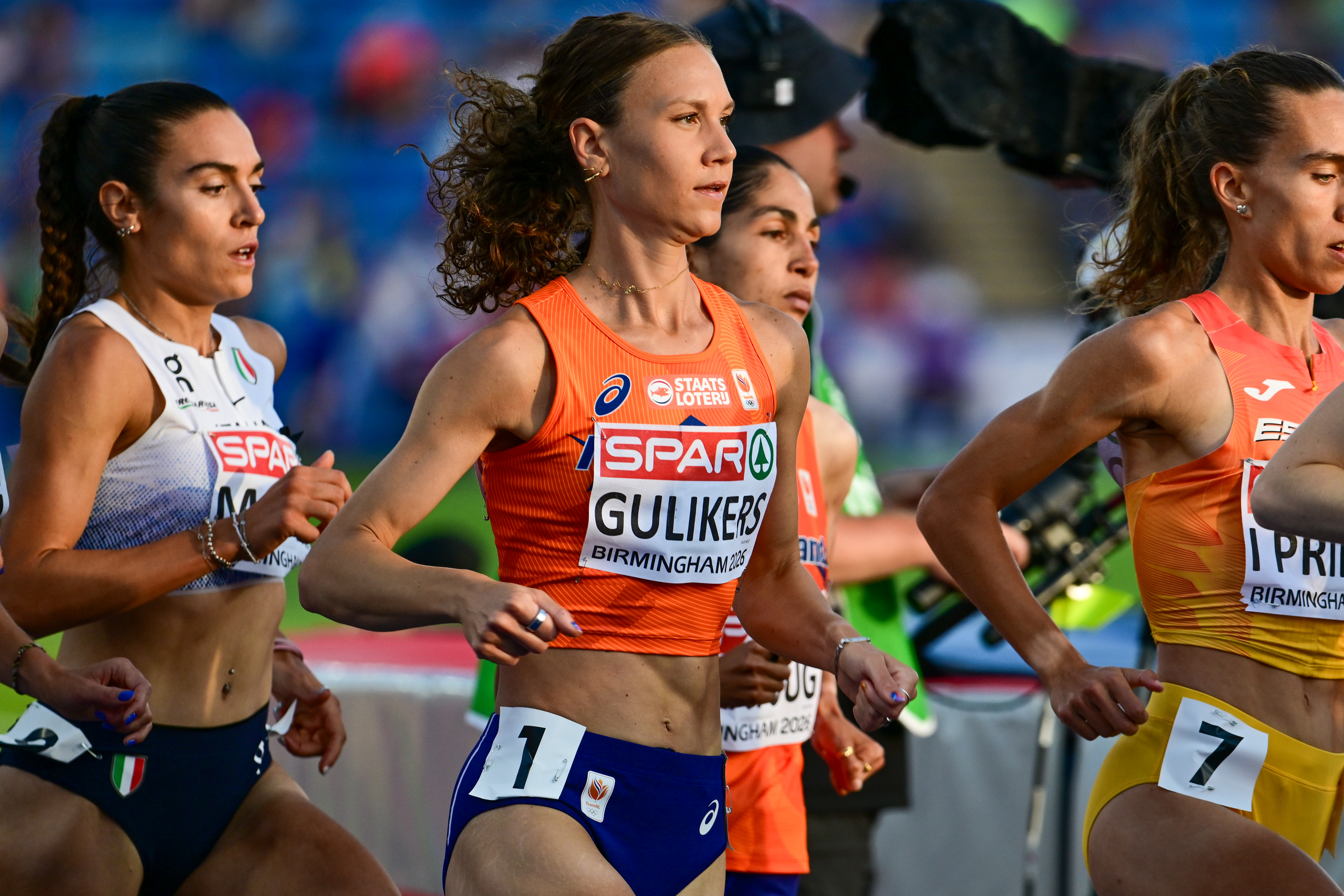
- Competing at the 2026 European Championships

Personal information
- Born: 18 August 1994 (age 32)

Sport
- Sport: Athletics
- Event: Long-distance running

Jennifer Gulikers (born 18 August 1994) is a Dutch long-distance runner. She won the Dutch Athletics Championships in 2025 and 2026 over 5000 metres. She has also won Dutch titles on the road including over 10km and half marathon distances.

== Early and personal life ==
From Elsloo, Limburg, but later based in Ede and Castricum, she combines athletics with working as a civil servant in Sittard-Geleen.

== Career ==
From the age of six years-old she had played handball but gave up the sport having torn an anterior cruciate knee ligament three times by the age of 23 she started focusing more on athletics, having started running more during rehabilitation and joined Athletics Club Caesar in Beek.

Gulikers was runner-up at the 2022 Dutch 10 km Road Running Championships in Venlo. Gulikers placed third over both 5000 metres and 10,000 metres at the 2022 Dutch Athletics Championships and had a third place in the Egmond Half Marathon and a fourth place at the national 10 km road championships in February 2023. In June 2023, she was runner-up at the Dutch 10,000m Championships in Leiden.

In March 2025, she became the Dutch half marathon champion in Venlo. On the track that year, she ran a personal best of 15:05.68 in Oordegem, Belgium. With that time, she moved to sixth on the Dutch all-time list. In June, she won the Dutch title over 10,000 metres, finishing as the first Dutch woman at the Gouden Spike in Leiden with a time of 32:35.08. She then also won the Dutch Athletics Championships in August 2025 over 5000 metres. She won her fourth national title in a year with victory over 10km on the roads in Utrecht in October 2025.

In May 2026, she placed fourth in the European 10,000m Cup in La Spezia, Italy, in a time of 32:01.57. She retained the Dutch Championships title in 2026 over 5000 metres. She competed over 5000 metres at the 2026 European Athletics Championships in Birmingham, England, placing thirteenth overall.
