= Elżbieta Glinka =

Polish long-distance runner

Personal information
- Born: 30 October 1993 (age 32)
- Height: 1.69 m (5 ft 7 in)
- Weight: 62 kg (137 lb)

Sport
- Sport: Athletics
- Event: Long-distance running
- Club: Passion First Warszawa
- Coached by: Mikołaj Raczyński

Achievements and titles
- Personal bests: 5000m: 15:08.19 (2026); 10,000m: 31:45.37 (2026); Road; 5k: 15:41 (2026); 10k: 31:47 (2026) NR; Half marathon: 1:09:25 (2026); Marathon: 2:34:06 (2024)
Medal record
Representing Poland
European 10,000m Cup
Gold medal – first place	2026 La Spezia	10,000 m

Elżbieta Glinka (born 30 October 1993) is a Polish long-distance runner. She became Polish champion over 10,000 metres in 2026 and won the European 10,000m Cup that year. She is the Polish national record holder in the 10k run.

== Biography ==
Glinka was a recreational runner for some years prior to competing in professional races relatively late, having ran 1:33:51 at the Poznan half marathon. In 2024, she ran a time of 16:38 in the 5k run at the AR Mokotowska Piątka.

In February 2025, she ran 1:12:46 to finish runner-up at the Polish half marathon championships. She first represented Poland at the 2025 European Running Championships in Brussels-Leuven, where she placed 33rd overall in the 10k run. In November 2025, she set the Polish national record in the 10k run at the Warsaw Independence Run with 32:00, before also improving her personal best in the half marathon later that month as she won the Milano21 in a time of 1:10:49, to move into the top-five on the Polish all-time list.

In January 2026, she set a new Polish 10k run national record of 31:47 on the roads in Valencia, Spain. She then ran 32:18:90 in winning the Polish 10,000 metres championships in April 2026. The following month, she won the European 10,000m Cup in La Spezia, Italy, becoming the first Polish winner of the event, and winning in a lifetime best of 31:45.37. The following month, she also won the Polish 5km title in Warsaw. In August, she competed at the 2026 European Athletics Championships in Birmingham, England, placing twelfth in the 10,000 metres.

== Personal life ==
She holds a Master's degree in Civil Engineering from the Faculty of Civil Engineering, Mechanics and Petrochemistry in Płock, a branch of the Warsaw University of Technology.

== International competitions ==
Year	Competition	Venue	Position	Event	Notes
Representing Poland
2025	European Running Championships	Leuven, Belgium	33rd	10 km	32:57
2026	European 10,000m Cup	La Spezia, Italy	1st	10,000 m	31:45.36
2026	European Championships	Birmingham, United Kingdom	12th	10,000 m	32:16.65
2026	World Road Running Championships	Copenhagen, Denmark	22nd	5 km	15:41
