= Turkey at the 2022 European Championships =

in (Germany) Munich 11 August 2022 – 22 August 2022
- Competitors: 73 in 7 sports
- Medals Ranked 24th: Gold 1 Silver 4 Bronze 3 Total 8

European Championships appearances
- 2018; 2022

Turkey competed at the 2022 European Championships in Munich from August 11 to August 22, 2022.

== Medallists ==
| Medal | Name | Sport | Event | Date |
|---|---|---|---|---|
| Gold | Yasemin Can | Athletics | Women's 10,000 metres | 15 August |
| Silver | Enes Yenipazarlı; Bayram Sönmez | Rowing | Men's lightweight coxless pair | 14 August |
| Silver | Ahmet Önder | Gymnastics | Men's individual all-around | 18 August |
| Silver | Yasemin Can | Athletics | Women's 5000 metres | 18 August |
| Silver | Adem Asil | Gymnastics | Men's rings | 21 August |
| Bronze | Adem Asil | Gymnastics | Men's individual all-around | 18 August |
| Bronze | Yasmani Copello | Athletics | Men's 400 metres hurdles | 19 August |
| Bronze | Ferhat Arıcan; Adem Asil; Mehmet Ayberk Koşak; Ahmet Önder; Kerem Şener | Gymnastics | Men's team all-around | 20 August |

== Competitors ==
The following is the list of number of competitors in the Championships:

| Sport | Men | Women | Total |
|---|---|---|---|
| Athletics | 26 | 15 | 41 |
| Gymnastics (men and women) | 5 | 5 | 10 |
| Canoe sprint | 5 | 1 | 6 |
| Cycling mountain bike | 3 | 0 | 3 |
| Rowing | 4 | 0 | 4 |
| Table tennis | 3 | 3 | 6 |
| Triathlon | 3 | 0 | 3 |
| Total | 49 | 24 | 73 |

== Athletics ==
Turkey entered the following athletes.

Key

- Q = Qualified for the next round
- q = Qualified for the next round as a fastest loser or, in field events, by position without achieving the qualifying target
- NR = National record
- PB = Personal best
- SB = Season best
- N/A = Round not applicable for the event

=== Men ===
Track and road events

| Athlete | Event | Heat | | Semifinal | | Final | |
| Athlete | Event | Result | Rank | Result | Rank | Result | Rank |
|---|---|---|---|---|---|---|---|
| Kayhan Özer | 100 m | 10.31 | 6 Q | 10.34 | 20 | Did not advance | |
| Emre Zafer Barnes | 100 m | 10.33 | 7 Q | 10.41 | 22 | Did not advance | |
| Jak Ali Harvey | 100 m | Bye | | DQ | | Did not advance | |
| Ramil Guliyev | 200 m | Bye | | 20.44 | 9 Q | DNF | |
| Aras Kaya | 10,000 m | —N/a | | | | 28:23.77 | 16 |
| Ömer Alkanoğlu | Marathon | —N/a | | | | DNF | |
| Polat Kemboi Arıkan | Marathon | —N/a | | | | DNF | |
| Mikdat Sevler | 110 m hurdles | Bye | | DNS | | Did not advance | |
| Yasmani Copello | 400 m hurdles | Bye | | 49.34 | 8 Q | 48.78 | 3rd place, bronze medalist(s) |
| İsmail Nezir | 400 m hurdles | Bye | | 49.78 | 16 | Did not advance | |
| Hillary Yego | 3000 m steeplechase | 8:43.76 | 23 | —N/a | | Did not advance | |
| Salih Korkmaz | 20 km walk | —N/a | | | | 1:20:50 PB | 7 |
| Abdulselam İmük | 20 km walk | —N/a | | | | DNF | |
| Şahin Şenoduncu | 20 km walk | —N/a | | | | DQ | |
| Emre Zafer Barnes; Jak Ali Harvey; Kayhan Özer; Ertan Özkan | 4 × 100 m relay | 38.98 | 7 q | —N/a | | 39.20 | 7 |
| Oğuzhan Kaya; Kubilay Ençü; Batuhan Altıntaş; İsmail Nezir | 4 × 400 m relay | 3:06.68 | 14 | —N/a | | Did not advance | |

Field events

| Athlete | Event | Qualification | | Final | |
| Athlete | Event | Distance | Position | Distance | Position |
|---|---|---|---|---|---|
| Enes Talha Şenses | High jump | 2.12 | 23 | Did not advance | |
| Ersu Şaşma | Pole vault | 5.50 | 19 | Did not advance | |
| Necati Er | Triple jump | NM | | Did not advance | |
| Alperen Karahan | Shot put | 19.25 | 20 | Did not advance | |
| Özkan Baltacı | Hammer throw | 70.34 | 22 | Did not advance | |
| Emin Öncel | Javelin throw | 68.97 | 24 | Did not advance | |

=== Women ===
Track and road events

| Athlete | Event | Heat | | Semifinal | | Final | |
| Athlete | Event | Result | Rank | Result | Rank | Result | Rank |
|---|---|---|---|---|---|---|---|
| Ekaterina Guliyev | 800 m | 2:01.59 | 3 Q | 2:01.32 | 10 | Did not advance | |
| Yasemin Can | 5000 m | —N/a | | | | 14:56.91 | 2nd place, silver medalist(s) |
| Yasemin Can | 10,000 m | —N/a | | | | 30:32.57 SB | 1st place, gold medalist(s) |
| Tuğba Güvenç | 3000 m steeplechase | 9:31.86 SB | 2 Q | —N/a | | 9:25.58 PB | 5 |
| Ruken Tek | 3000 m steeplechase | 10:31.84 | 31 | —N/a | | Did not advance | |
| Meryem Bekmez | 20 km walk | —N/a | | | | 1:39:30 | 17 |
| Kader Dost | 20 km walk | —N/a | | | | 1:42:26 | 19 |
| Ayşe Tekdal | 20 km walk | —N/a | | | | DNF | |

Field events

| Athlete | Event | Qualification | | Final | |
| Athlete | Event | Distance | Position | Distance | Position |
|---|---|---|---|---|---|
| Buse Arıkazan | Pole vault | NM | | Did not advance | |
| Gizem Akgöz | Triple jump | 13.40 | 18 | Did not advance | |
| Tuğba Danışmaz | Triple jump | NM | | Did not advance | |
| Emel Dereli | Shot put | 16.56 | 21 | Did not advance | |
| Pınar Akyol | Shot put | 15.89 | 23 | Did not advance | |
| Özlem Becerek | Discus throw | 56.01 | 19 | Did not advance | |
| Kıvılcım Kaya | Hammer throw | 67.68 | 12 q | 67.04 | 11 |
| Eda Tuğsuz | Javelin throw | 56.33 | 15 | Did not advance | |

== Gymnastics ==
Turkey has entered 5 men and 5 women.

=== Men ===
Qualification

| Athlete | Event | Qualification | | | | | | | | Final | | | | | | | |
| Athlete | Event | Apparatus | | | | | | Total | Rank | Apparatus | | | | | | Total | Rank |
| Athlete | Event | F | PH | R | V | PB | HB | Total | Rank | F | PH | R | V | PB | HB | Total | Rank |
|---|---|---|---|---|---|---|---|---|---|---|---|---|---|---|---|---|---|
| Ferhat Arıcan | Team | | | | | | | | | | | | | | | —N/a | |
| Adem Asil | Team | | | | | | | | | | | | | | | —N/a | |
| İbrahim Çolak | Team | | | | | | | | | | | | | | | —N/a | |
| Sercan Demir | Team | | | | | | | | | | | | | | | —N/a | |
| Ahmet Önder | Team | | | | | | | | | | | | | | | —N/a | |
| Total | Team | | | | | | | | | | | | | | | | |

=== Women ===
Qualification

| Athlete | Event | Qualification | | | | | | Final | | | | | |
| Athlete | Event | Apparatus | | | | Total | Rank | Apparatus | | | | Total | Rank |
| Athlete | Event | V | UB | BB | F | Total | Rank | V | UB | BB | F | Total | Rank |
|---|---|---|---|---|---|---|---|---|---|---|---|---|---|
| Ceren Biner | Team | | | | | | | | | | | —N/a | |
| Sevgi Kayışoğlu | Team | | | | | | | | | | | —N/a | |
| Nazlı Savranbaşı | Team | | | | | | | | | | | —N/a | |
| Bilge Tarhan | Team | | | | | | | | | | | —N/a | |
| Bengisu Yıldız | Team | | | | | | | | | | | —N/a | |
| Total | Team | | | | | | | | | | | | |

== Triathlon ==
| Athlete | Event | Swim (1.5 km) | Trans 1 | Bike (40 km) | Trans 2 | Run (10 km) | Total Time | Rank |
|---|---|---|---|---|---|---|---|---|
| Gültigin Er | Men's | | | | | | | |
