= 2019 European Athletics U23 Championships – Women's 5000 metres =

The women's 5000 metres event at the 2019 European Athletics U23 Championships was held in Gävle, Sweden, at Gavlehof Stadium Park on 14 July.

== Results ==
Rank	Name	Nationality	Time	Notes
1st place, gold medalist(s)	Anna Emilie Møller	Denmark	15:07.70	NR
2nd place, silver medalist(s)	Alina Reh	Germany	15:11.25	
3rd place, bronze medalist(s)	Célia Antón	Spain	15:28.66	NU23R
4	Miriam Dattke	Germany	15:40.61	PB
5	Francesca Tommasi	Italy	15:44.90	PB
6	Jodie Judd	Great Britain	15:51.67	PB
7	Yayla Kiliç	Turkey	15:52.88	PB
8	Sylwia Indeka	Poland	15:57.86	PB
9	Federica Zanne	Italy	16:05.36	PB
10	Leah Hanle	Germany	16:05.87	
11	Cristina Ruiz	Spain	16:07.13	PB
12	Amelia Quirk	Great Britain	16:08.71	
13	Diane van Es	Netherlands	16:09.28	
14	Aneta Chlebiková	Czech Republic	16:09.77	PB
15	Sara Christiansson	Sweden	16:13.72	
16	Leila Hadji	France	16:14.21	
17	Isabel Barreiro	Spain	16:23.92	
18	Mathilde Senechal	France	16:25.63	
19	Ylva Traxler	Austria	17:00.59	
	Eglė Morėnaitė	Lithuania	DNF	
