= Turkey at the 2018 European Championships =

- IOC code: TUR

in (United Kingdom) Glasgow (Germany) Berlin 2 August 2018 – 12 August 2018
- Competitors: 94 in 3 sports
- Medals Ranked 22nd: Gold 1 Silver 3 Bronze 2 Total 6

European Championships appearances
- 2018; 2022

Turkey competed at the inaugural 7 sports 2018 European Championships from 2 to 12 August 2018. It competed in 3 sports.

== Medallists ==
Medal	Name	Sport	Event	Date
Gold	Ramil Guliyev	Athletics	Men's 200 metres	9 August
Silver	Yasmani Copello	Athletics	Men's 400 metres hurdles	9 August
Silver	İbrahim Çolak	Gymnastics	Men's rings	12 August
Silver	Aykut Ay; Emre Zafer Barnes; Ramil Guliyev; Jak Ali Harvey; Yiğitcan Hekimoğlu; İzzet Safer	Athletics	Men's 4 × 100 metres relay	12 August
Bronze	Jak Ali Harvey	Athletics	Men's 100 metres	7 August
Bronze	Yasemin Can	Athletics	Women's 5000 metres	12 August
