= 2016 European Athletics Championships – Women's 10,000 metres =

Women's 10,000 metres at the 2016 European Athletics Championships
- Venue: Olympic Stadium
- Location: Amsterdam
- Dates: July 6 (final)
- Competitors: 18 from 14 nations
- Winning time: 31:12.86

Medalists
gold medal	Yasemin Can	Turkey
silver medal	Ana Dulce Félix	Portugal
bronze medal	Karoline Bjerkeli Grøvdal	Norway

The women's 10,000 metres at the 2016 European Athletics Championships took place at the Olympic Stadium on 6 July.

== Records ==
Standing records prior to the 2016 European Athletics Championships
World record	Wang Junxia (CHN)	29:31.78	Beijing, China	8 September 1993
European record	Elvan Abeylegesse (TUR)	29:56.34	Beijing, China	15 August 2008
Championship record	Paula Radcliffe (GBR)	30:01.09	Munich, Germany	6 August 2002
World Leading	Netsanet Gudeta (ETH)	30:56.26	Herzogenaurach, Germany	13 May 2016
European Leading	Yasemin Can (TUR)	31:30.58	Mersin, Turkey	1 May 2016

== Schedule ==
Date	Time	Round
6 July 2016	18:55	Final

All times are local times (UTC+2)

== Results ==
=== Final ===
Rank	Name	Nationality	Time	Note
1st place, gold medalist(s)	Yasemin Can	Turkey	31:12.86	EL, EU23
2nd place, silver medalist(s)	Dulce Félix	Portugal	31:19.03	PB
3rd place, bronze medalist(s)	Karoline Bjerkeli Grøvdal	Norway	31:23.45	PB
4	Fionnuala McCormack	Ireland	31:30.74	SB
5	Jo Pavey	Great Britain	31:34.61	SB
6	Veronica Inglese	Italy	31:37.43	PB
7	Jess Andrews	Great Britain	31:38.02	PB
8	Jip Vastenburg	Netherlands	32:04.00	
9	Sarah Lahti	Sweden	32:14.17	
10	Trihas Gebre	Spain	32:20.45	
11	Alexi Pappas	Greece	32:27.80	
12	Carla Salomé Rocha	Portugal	32:57.44	
13	Christelle Daunay	France	33:03.36	
14	Tara Jameson	Ireland	33:19.85	
15	Olha Skrypak	Ukraine	33:36.79	SB
16	Johanna Peiponen	Finland	34:39.91	
	Almensch Belete	Belgium	DNF	
	Sara Moreira	Portugal	DNF	

Source: European-athletics.org
