= 2022 European Athletics Championships – Women's 5000 metres =

Women's 5000 metres at the 2022 European Athletics Championships
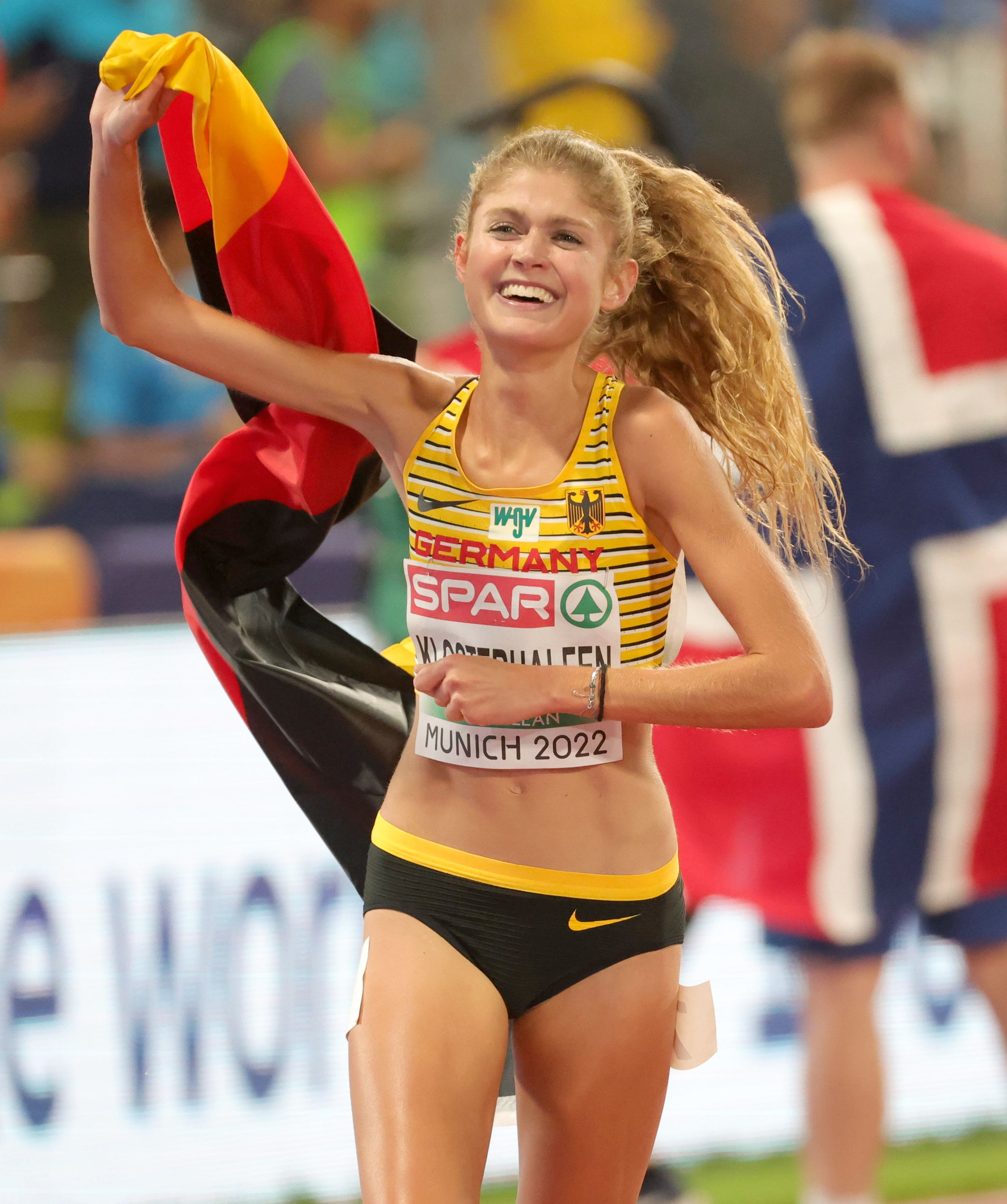
- Venue: Olympic Stadium
- Location: Munich
- Dates: 18 August (final)
- Competitors: 21 from 13 nations
- Winning time: 14:50.47

Medalists
gold medal	Konstanze Klosterhalfen	Germany
silver medal	Yasemin Can	Turkey
bronze medal	Eilish McColgan	Great Britain

The women's 5000 metres at the 2022 European Athletics Championships took place at the Olympic Stadium on 18 August.

== Records ==
Standing records prior to the 2022 European Athletics Championships
World record	Letesenbet Gidey (ETH)	14:06.62	Valencia, Spain	7 October 2020
European record	Sifan Hassan (NED)	14:22.12	London, Great Britain	21 July 2019
Championship record	Sifan Hassan (NED)	14:46.12	Berlin, Germany	12 August 2018
World Leading	Ejgayehu Taye (ETH)	14:12.98	Eugene, Oregon, United States	27 May 2022
European Leading	Karoline Bjerkeli Grøvdal (NOR)	14:31.07	Oslo, Norway	16 June 2022

== Schedule ==
Date	Time	Round
18 August 2022	21:42	Final

== Results ==
=== Final ===
Place	Athlete	Nation	Time	Notes
1st place, gold medalist(s)	Konstanze Klosterhalfen	Germany	14:50.47	
2nd place, silver medalist(s)	Yasemin Can	Turkey	14:56.91	
3rd place, bronze medalist(s)	Eilish McColgan	Great Britain	14:59.34	
4	Maureen Koster	Netherlands	15:03.29	
5	Amy-Eloise Markovc	Great Britain	15:08.75	
6	Calli Thackery	Great Britain	15:08.79	
7	Nadia Battocletti	Italy	15:10.90	SB
8	Selamawit Teferi	Israel	15:14.36	SB
9	Viktória Wagner-Gyürkés	Hungary	15:16.11	PB
10	Camilla Richardsson	Finland	15:20.94	PB
11	Sara Benfares	Germany	15:20.94	PB
12	Marta García	Spain	15:23.36	PB
13	Diane Van Es	Netherlands	15:26.44	
14	Roisin Flanagan	Ireland	15:33.72	
15	Lisa Rooms	Belgium	15:50.59	
16	Carla Gallardo	Spain	15:52.64	
17	Cristina Ruiz	Spain	16:07.70	
18	Ilona Mononen	Finland	16:10.97	
19	Manon Trapp	France	16:15.44	
	Alina Reh	Germany	DNF	
	Karoline Bjerkeli Grøvdal	Norway	DNF	
	Sarah Lahti	Sweden	DNS	
