= The Big Half =

Annual race held in London, England

- Date: September
- Location: London, United Kingdom
- Event type: Road
- Distance: Half marathon
- Established: 4 March 2018; 8 years ago
- Course records: Men: 1:00:22 (Kenenisa Bekele, 2020); Women: 1:07:35 (Eilish McColgan, 2022)
- Website: www.thebighalf.co.uk

The Big Half is an annual road running event over the half marathon distance (21.1 km), held in central London, United Kingdom. The event, first held in 2018, initially took place in early March, a few weeks before the London Marathon, but after the COVID-19 pandemic switched to dates in late August/early September.

== Course ==
The event, organised by London Marathon Events, attracts both mass and elite participation, with runners following a course that is closed to road traffic. They start near the north side of Tower Bridge on the Highway then run eastwards, including a stretch through the Limehouse Link tunnel, to the Canary Wharf district before returning through Wapping to cross Tower Bridge. Runners then route through Bermondsey, Rotherhithe, Surrey Quays and Deptford to finish by the Cutty Sark in Greenwich. Finish area facilities are accommodated in the grounds of the Old Royal Naval College, the National Maritime Museum and Queen's House and in Greenwich Park.

The 2023 event attracted over 16,000 runners, and was also the official British Athletics trial race for the 2023 World Athletics Road Running Championships.

The Big Mile is a free mass participation event using the same finishing stretch as The Big Half.

== Records ==
Mo Farah and Charlotte Purdue are respectively both three-time winners of the elite men's and elite women's categories of the event. The men's course record holder is Kenenisa Bekele; the women's course record holder is Eilish McColgan.

=== Editions ===
Edition	Date	Men's winner	Time	Women's winner	Time
1	4 March 2018	Mo Farah (GBR)	1:01:40	Charlotte Purdue (GBR)	1:10:29
2	10 March 2019	Mo Farah (GBR)	1:01:15	Charlotte Purdue (GBR)	1:10:38
3	1 March 2020	Kenenisa Bekele (ETH)	1:00:22	Lily Partridge (GBR)	1:10:50
4	22 August 2021	Jake Smith (GBR)	1:02:06	Charlotte Purdue (GBR)	1:09:51
5	4 September 2022	Mo Farah (GBR)	1:01:49	Eilish McColgan (GBR)	1:07:35
6	3 September 2023	Jack Rowe (GBR)	1:01:08	Calli Thackery (GBR)	1:09:15
7	1 September 2024	Jack Rowe (GBR)	1:02:35	Eilish McColgan (GBR)	1:09:14

== Gallery ==
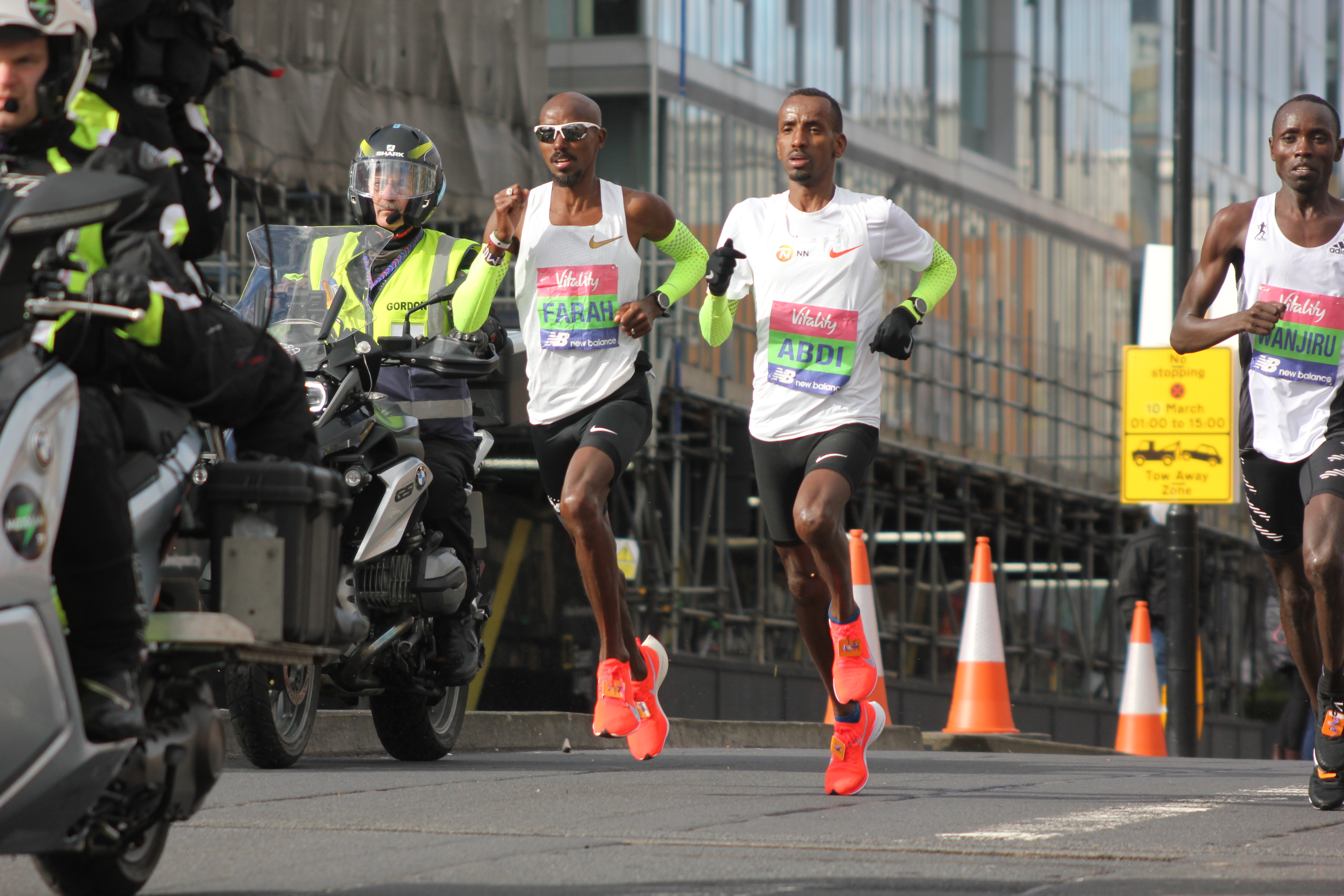
Mo Farah, Bashir Abdi and Daniel Wanjiru compete in the 2019 Big Half, finishing in that order

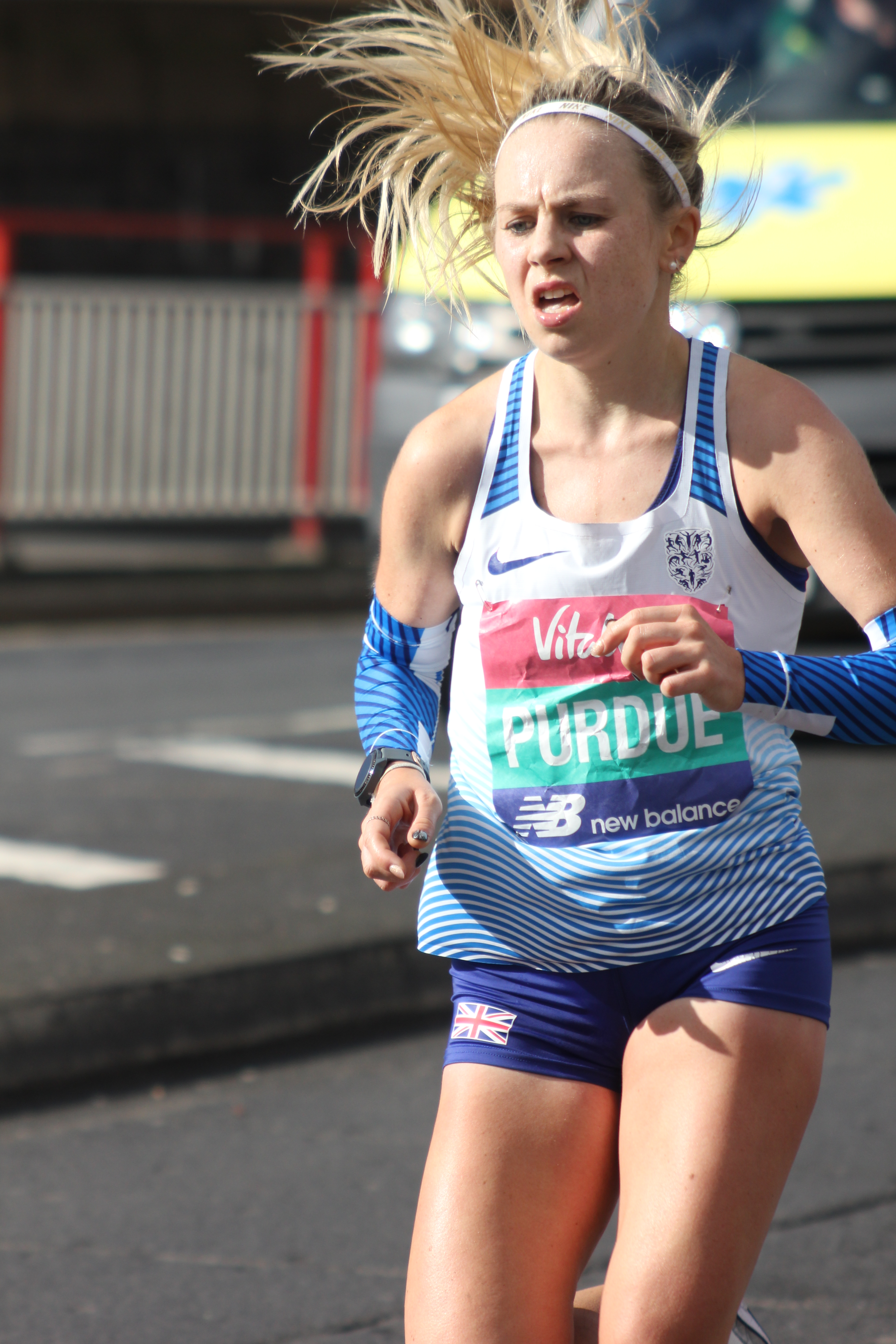
Charlotte Purdue heading to victory in 2019 Big Half

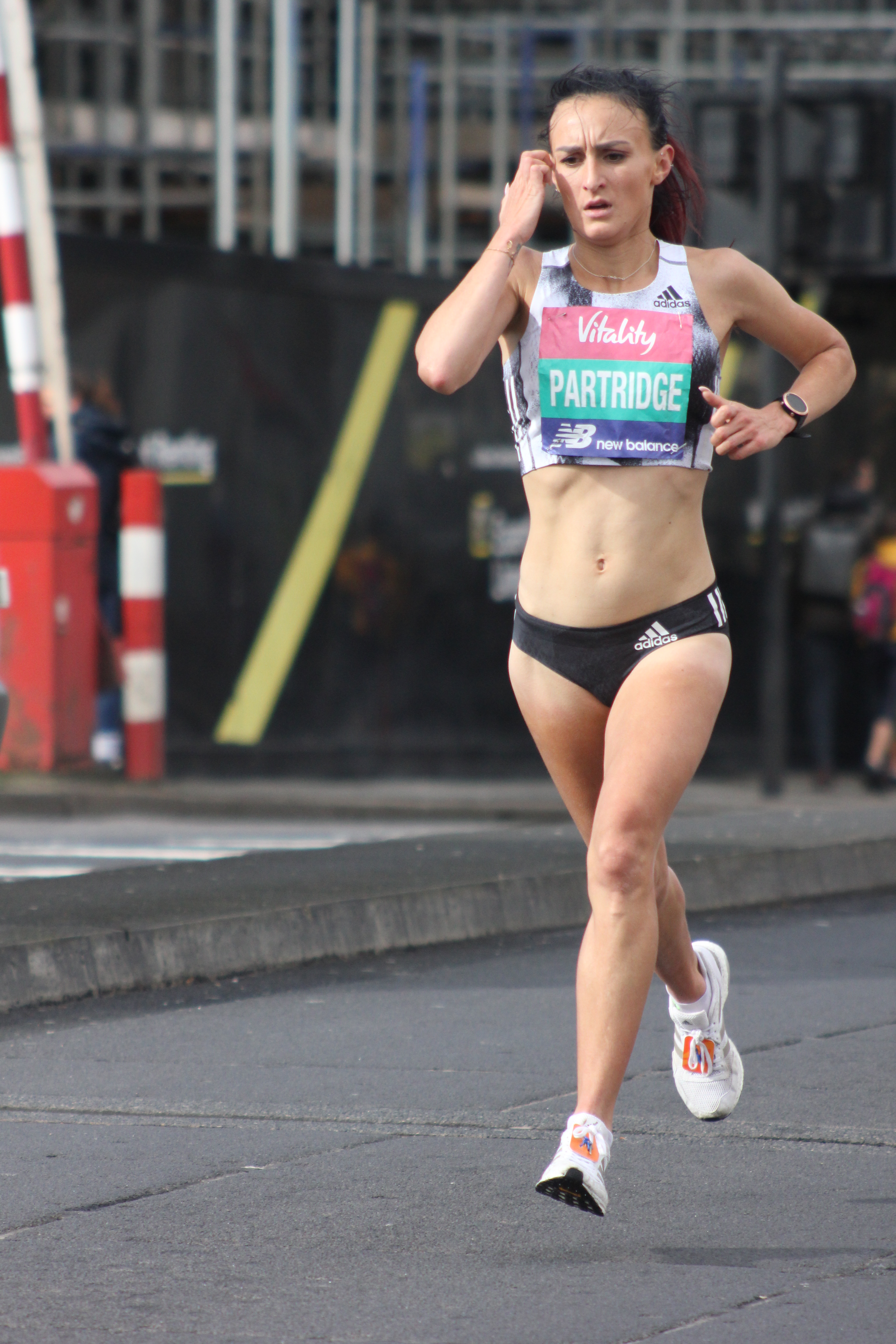
Winner in 2020, Lily Partridge in the 2019 Big Half

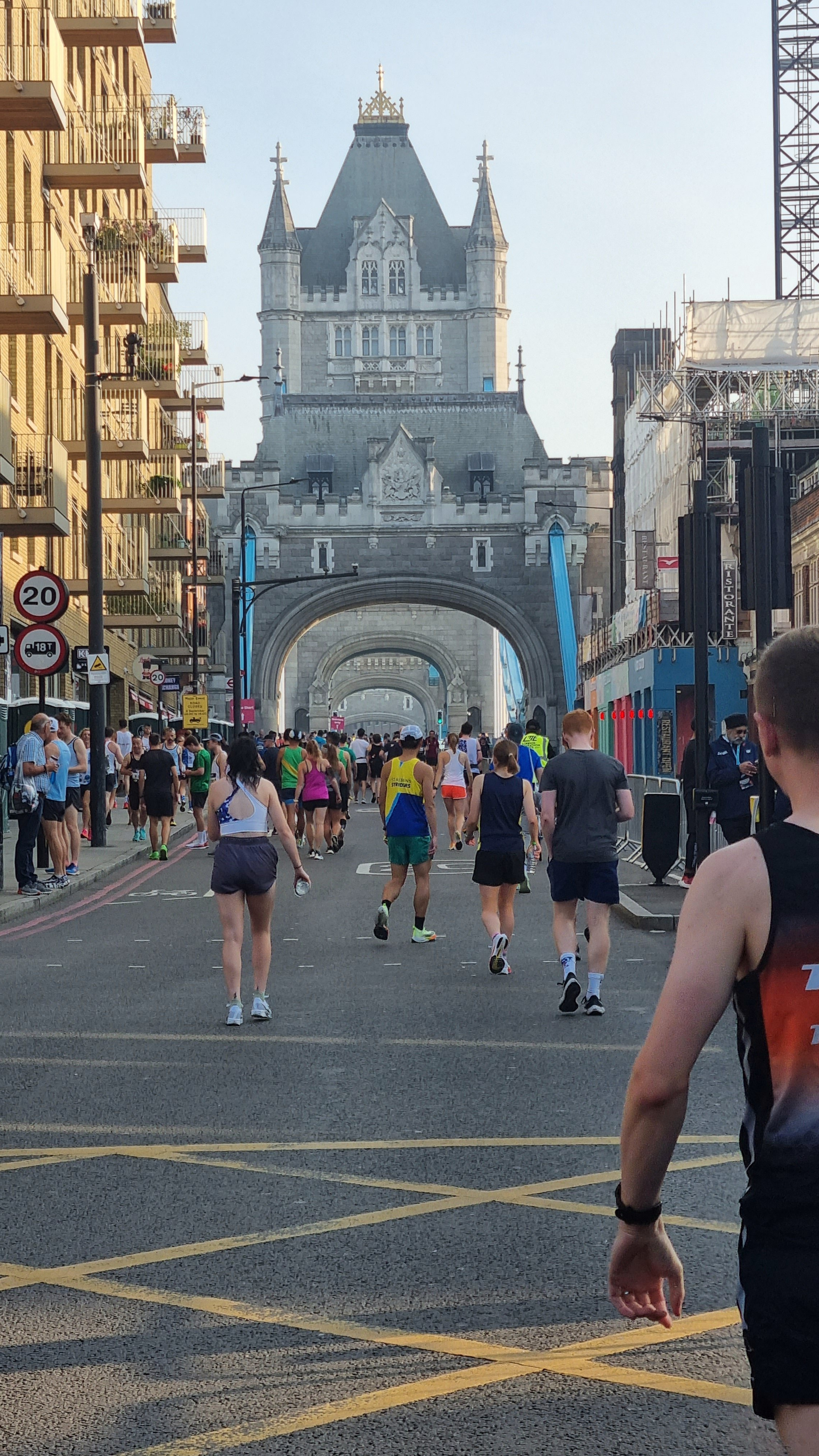
Runners walking northwards towards Tower Bridge before 2023 Big Half

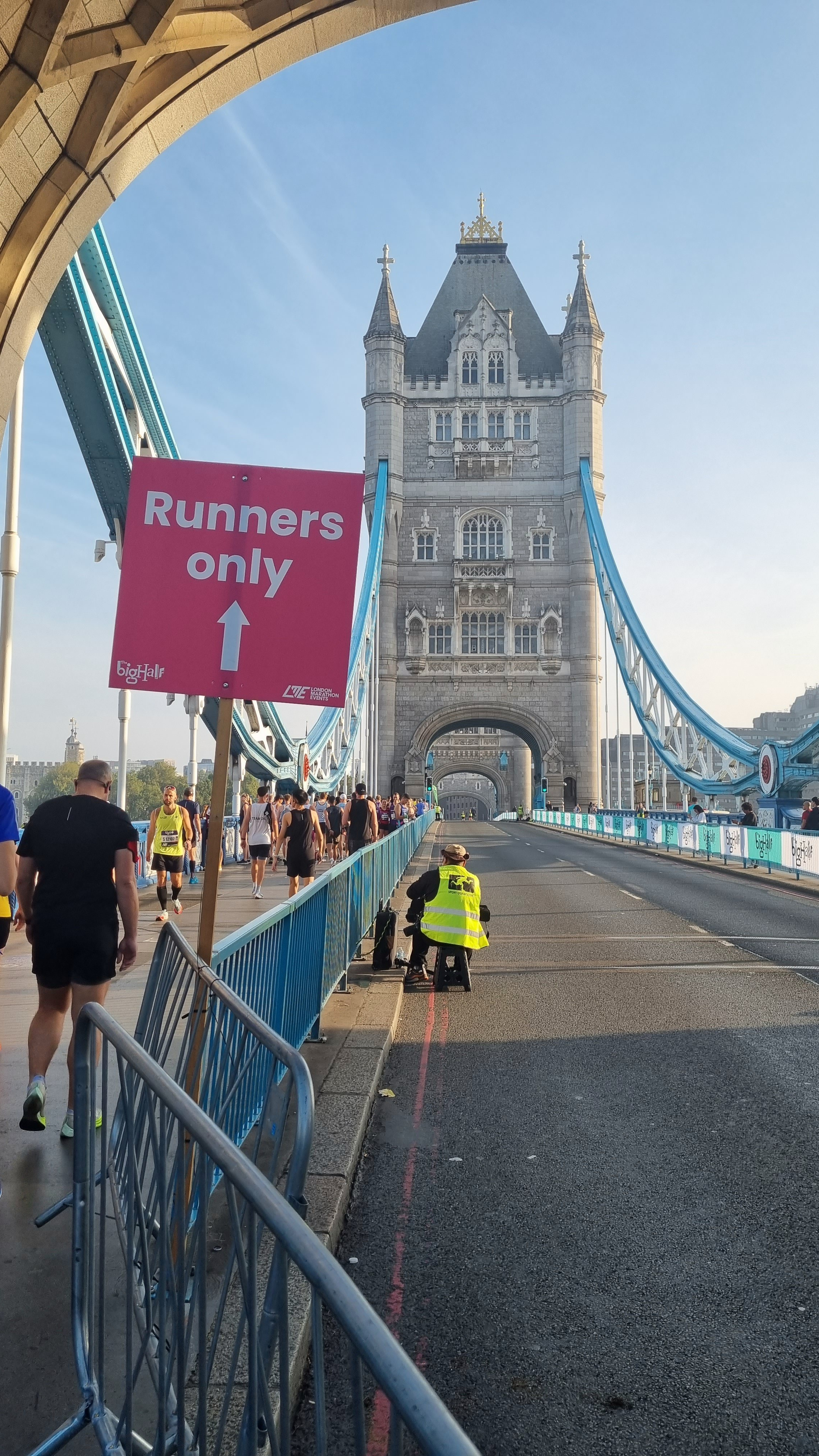
Big Half 'Runners only' sign on Tower Bridge

Spectators along the course near Millwall

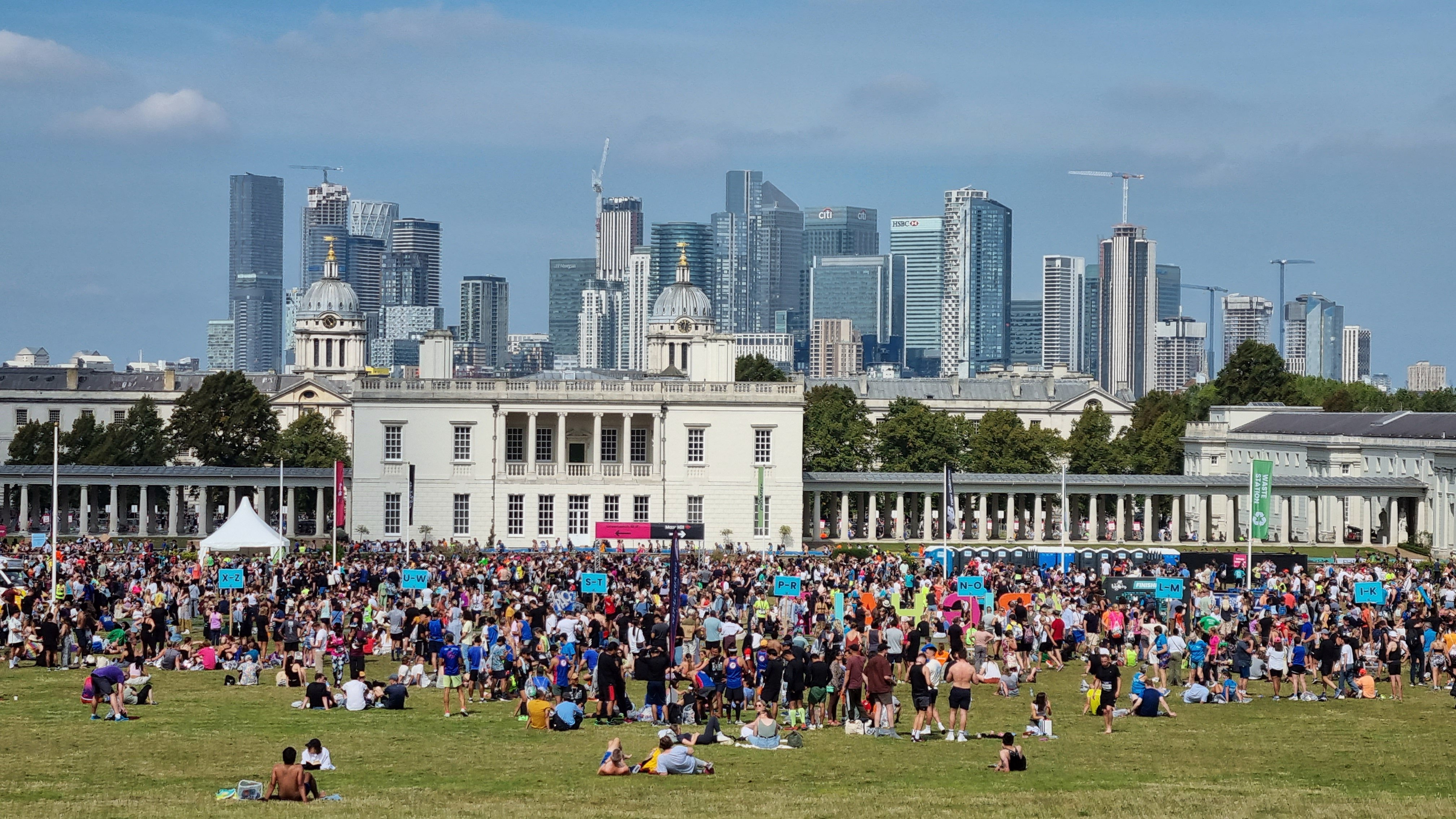
Greenwich Park being used for 2023 Big Half (Canary Wharf district in background)

Runners before the start of the race

== See also ==
- List of half marathon races
