= 2017 European Athletics Indoor Championships – Women's 3000 metres =

The women's 3000 metres event at the 2017 European Athletics Indoor Championships was held on 3 March 2017 at 12:15 (heats) and on 5 March 16:30 (final) local time.

== Medalists ==
Gold	Silver	Bronze
Laura Muir; Great Britain	Yasemin Can; Turkey	Eilish McColgan; Great Britain

== Records ==
Standing records after the 2017 European Athletics Indoor Championships
World record	Genzebe Dibaba (ETH)	8:16.60	Stockholm, Sweden	6 February 2014
European record	Laura Muir (GBR)	8:26.41	Karlsruhe, Germany	4 February 2017
Championship record	Fernanda Ribeiro (POR)	8:39.49	Stockholm, Sweden	9 March 1996
World Leading	Laura Muir (GBR)	8:26.41	Karlsruhe, Germany	4 February 2017
European Leading	Laura Muir (GBR)	8:26.41	Karlsruhe, Germany	4 February 2017

== Results ==
=== Heats ===
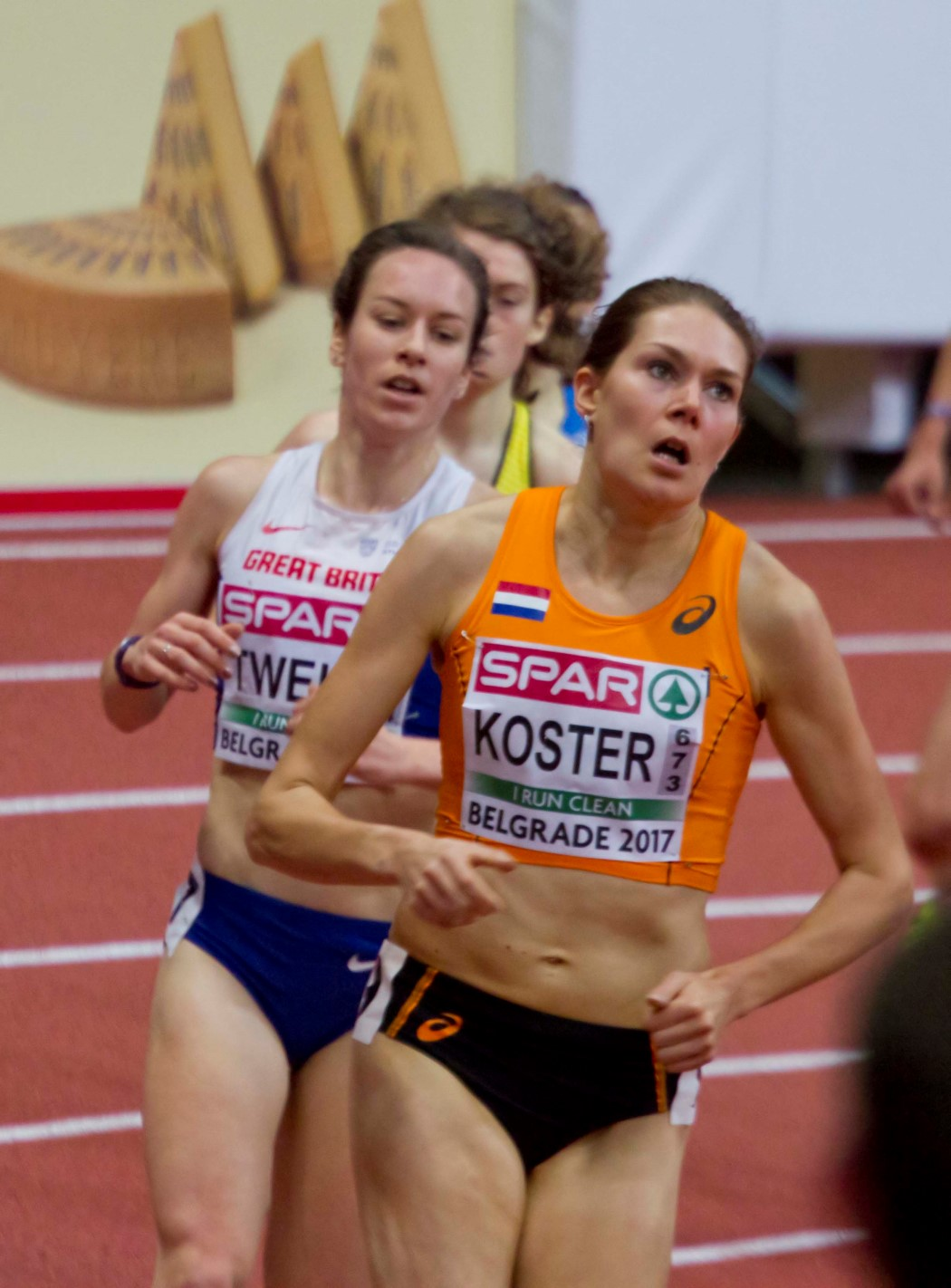
Scene from the final

Qualification: First 4 in each heat (Q) and the next 4 fastest (q) advance to the Final.

Rank	Heat	Athlete	Nationality	Time	Note
1	2	Yasemin Can	Turkey	8:52.33	Q, PB
2	2	Stephanie Twell	Great Britain	8:55.02	Q
3	2	Charlotta Fougberg	Sweden	8:55.21	Q, PB
4	2	Alina Reh	Germany	8:55.23	Q
5	2	Laura Muir	Great Britain	8:55.56	q
6	2	Ana Lozano	Spain	8:56.01	q, PB
7	1	Maureen Koster	Netherlands	8:57.52	Q
8	1	Eilish McColgan	Great Britain	8:57.85	Q
9	1	Giulia Viola	Italy	8:57.86	Q, SB
10	1	Nuria Fernández	Spain	8:58.20	Q, SB
11	1	Hanna Klein	Germany	8:58.45	q
12	2	Ancuța Bobocel	Romania	8:58.91	q, SB
13	2	Sviatlana Kudzelich	Belarus	9:03.21	SB
14	1	Roxana Bârcă	Romania	9:13.36	
15	1	Blanca Fernández	Spain	9:13.38	
16	2	Tuğba Güvenc	Turkey	9:35.86	
17	1	Emine Hatun Tuna	Turkey	9:36.78	

=== Final ===
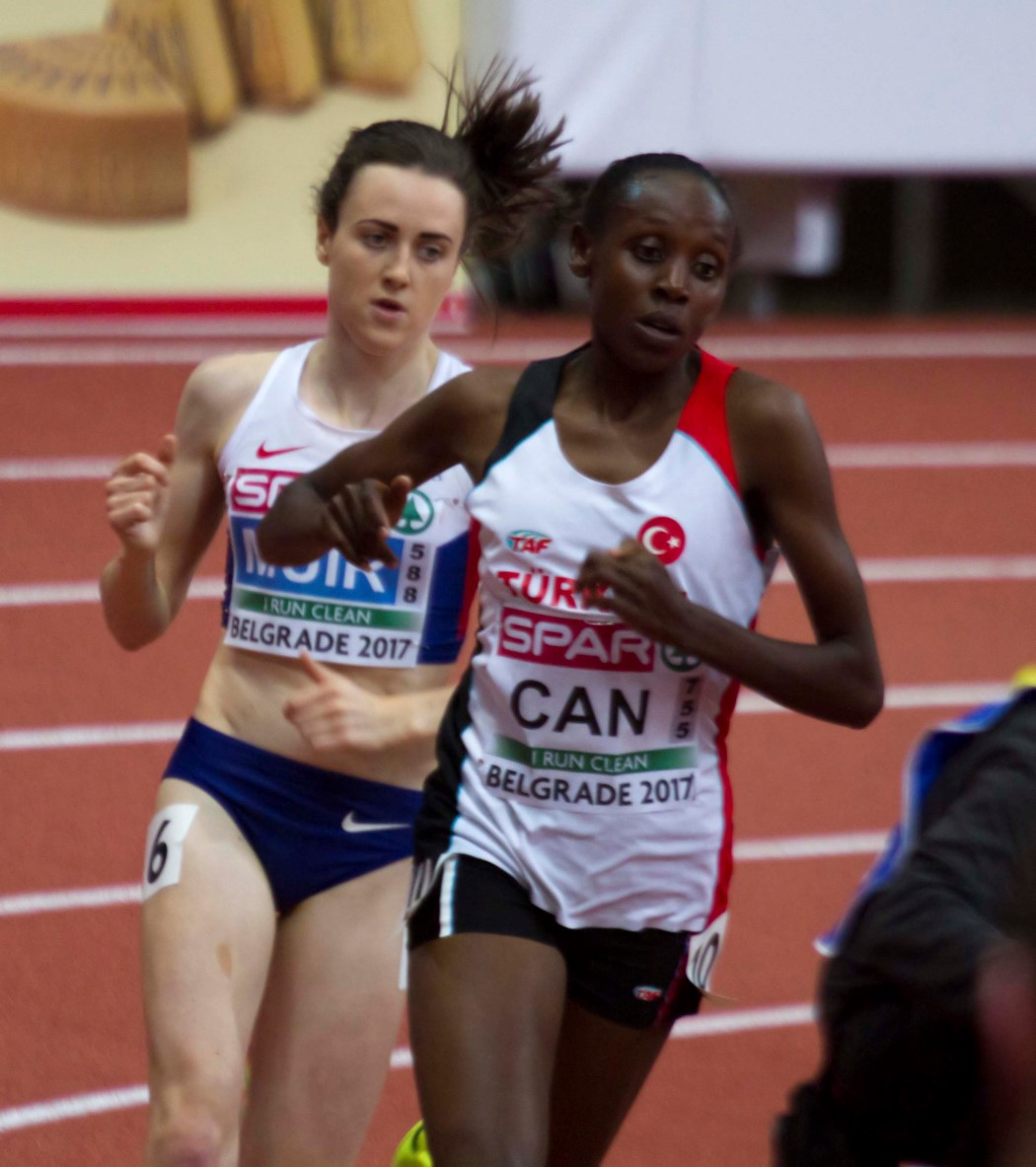
Scene from the final

Rank	Athlete	Nationality	Time	Note
1st place, gold medalist(s)	Laura Muir	Great Britain	8:35.67	CR
2nd place, silver medalist(s)	Yasemin Can	Turkey	8:43.46	NR
3rd place, bronze medalist(s)	Eilish McColgan	Great Britain	8:47.43	
4	Maureen Koster	Netherlands	8:48.99	
5	Stephanie Twell	Great Britain	8:50.40	
6	Ana Lozano	Spain	8:55.20	PB
7	Giulia Viola	Italy	8:56.19	PB
8	Alina Reh	Germany	8:57.87	
9	Hanna Klein	Germany	8:58.57	
10	Nuria Fernández	Spain	9:05.17	
11	Ancuța Bobocel	Romania	9:05.74	
12	Charlotta Fougberg	Sweden	9:09.53	
