= Mathilde Sénéchal =

French long-distance runner

Personal information
- Born: 24 January 1998 (age 28)

Sport
- Country: France
- Sport: Long-distance running
Medal record
Women's long-distance running
Representing France
Mediterranean U23 Championships
Gold medal – first place	2018 Jesolo	5000 m
European U20 Championships
Silver medal – second place	2017 Grosseto	3000 m

Mathilde Sénéchal (born 24 January 1998) is a French long-distance runner. In 2019, she competed in the senior women's race at the 2019 IAAF World Cross Country Championships held in Aarhus, Denmark. She finished in 60th place.

In 2017, she won the silver medal in the women's 3000 metres event at the 2017 European Athletics U20 Championships held in Grosseto, Italy.

In 2018, she won the gold medal in the women's 5000 metres event at the 2018 Mediterranean Athletics U23 Championships held in Jesolo, Italy.

In 2019, she competed in the women's 5000 metres event at the 2019 European Athletics U23 Championships held in Gävle, Sweden. She finished in 18th place.
