= Jack Rowe (runner) =

British long-distance runner (born 1996)

Personal information
- Nationality: British (English)
- Born: 30 January 1996 (age 30) Norwich, England

Sport
- Sport: Athletics
- Event: long distance

Achievements and titles
- Personal bests: 1500m: 3:38.57 (Chorzow, 2024); Mile: 3:58.76 (London 2021); 3000m: 7:38.35 (Boston 2024); 5000m: 13:04.74 (Boston, 2024); 10000m: 27:54.55 (Capistrano, 2024); Half marathon: 1:00:17 (New York, 2026); Marathon: 2:07:47 (London, 2026)

Jack Rowe (born 30 January 1996) is a British long-distance runner. He has competed at multiple major championships for Great Britain both on the track and on the road.

== Biography ==
Born in Norwich, Rowe attended St Mary's University, Twickenham and the University of San Francisco.

In 2020 he won silver in the 5000m at the British Championships. In December 2021 he finished eighteenth at the European Cross Country Championship that took place in Fingal, Dublin.

He was selected for the Great Britain squad to compete in the 3000m, for the 2021 and 2023 European Indoor Athletics Championships, held at the Arena Toruń in Poland, and the Ataköy Athletics Arena in Istanbul respectively. In both 2021 and 2023 Rowe qualified for the final in the 3000m race.

In September 2023, he won The Big Half in London. His time met the qualifying mark for the half-marathon at the inaugural World Road Running Championships, held in October 2023 in Riga. In September 2023, he also won the Vitality London 10,000m in a time of 28:13.

In January 2024, he ran a new 3000m indoors personal best of 7:38.35 in Boston, Massachusetts. In May, he was selected to run the 5000 metres for Britain at the 2024 European Athletics Championships in Rome. Competing at the 2024 British Athletics Championships in Manchester he placed third overall on 30 June 2024. He ran an outdoor personal best of 7:38.70 over 3000m at the 2024 London Athletics Meet. Rowe in 2024 also recorded personal bests in the 1500m, 5000m and 10,000m. He finalised his season with a victories at The Big Half in London and the Vitality London 10,000m.

In March 2025, he ran 1:02:51 to finish eleventh overall at the New York City half marathon, in the United States. In September, he won the Big Half for a third time, equalling the record of Mo Farah, but becoming the first man to win the event three years in a row.

In April 2026, Rowe ran 2:07:47 for an 14th place finish at the 2026 London Marathon.
