= Alina Reh =

German long-distance runner (born 1997)

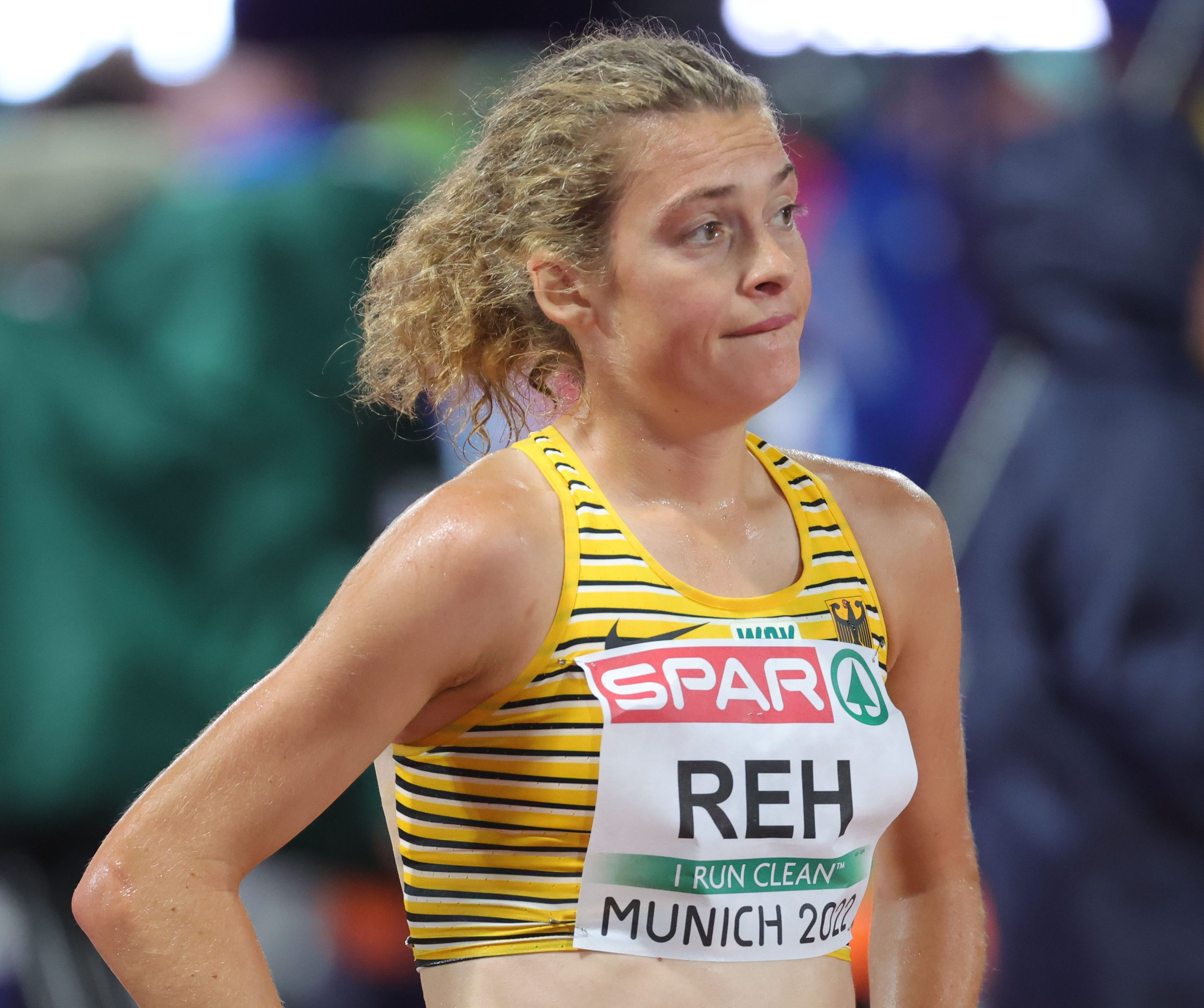
- Reh at the 2022 European Championships in Munich

Personal information
- Born: 23 May 1997 (age 29) Laichingen, Germany
- Height: 1.75 m (5 ft 9 in)
- Weight: 54 kg (119 lb)

Sport
- Country: Germany
- Sport: Athletics
- Event(s): Middle-, long-distance running
- Club: SCC Berlin
- Coached by: Jürgen Austin-Kerl
Medal record
Women's athletics
Representing Germany
European Championships
Bronze medal – third place	2018 Berlin	10,000 m
European Team Championships
Gold medal – first place	2017 Lille	5000 m
European U23 Championships
Gold medal – first place	2019 Gävle	10,000 m
Silver medal – second place	2017 Bydgoszcz	5000 m
Silver medal – second place	2019 Gävle	5000 m
European U20 Championships
Gold medal – first place	2015 Eskilstuna	3000 m
Gold medal – first place	2015 Eskilstuna	5000 m
Youth Olympic Games
Silver medal – second place	2014 Nanjing	3000 m
European Cross Country Championships
Gold medal – first place	2015 Hyères	Team
Gold medal – first place	2017 Šamorín	U23 race
Gold medal – first place	2022 Turin	Senior Team
Silver medal – second place	2016 Chia	U20 Team
Silver medal – second place	2017 Šamorín	U23 Team
Silver medal – second place	2021 Dublin	Senior Team
Bronze medal – third place	2014 Samokov	U20 Team
Bronze medal – third place	2015 Hyères	U20 race
Bronze medal – third place	2021 Dublin	Senior race
Bronze medal – third place	2022 Turin	Senior race

Alina Reh (born 23 May 1997) is a German middle- and long-distance runner. She won the bronze medal in the 10,000 metres at the 2018 European Athletics Championships. At the European U23 Championships, Reh earned silver for the 5000 metres in 2017 and silver in the event and gold for the 10,000 m in 2019. She took four individual medals at the European Cross Country Championships, including bronze in the senior race in 2021 and 2022.

Reh won silver for the 3000 m at the 2014 Summer Youth Olympics, and gold medals for the 3000 m and 5000 m at the 2015 European Junior Championships. She won several national titles.

She struggled with injuries for much of 2021 missing postponed 2020 Tokyo Olympics.

== Achievements ==
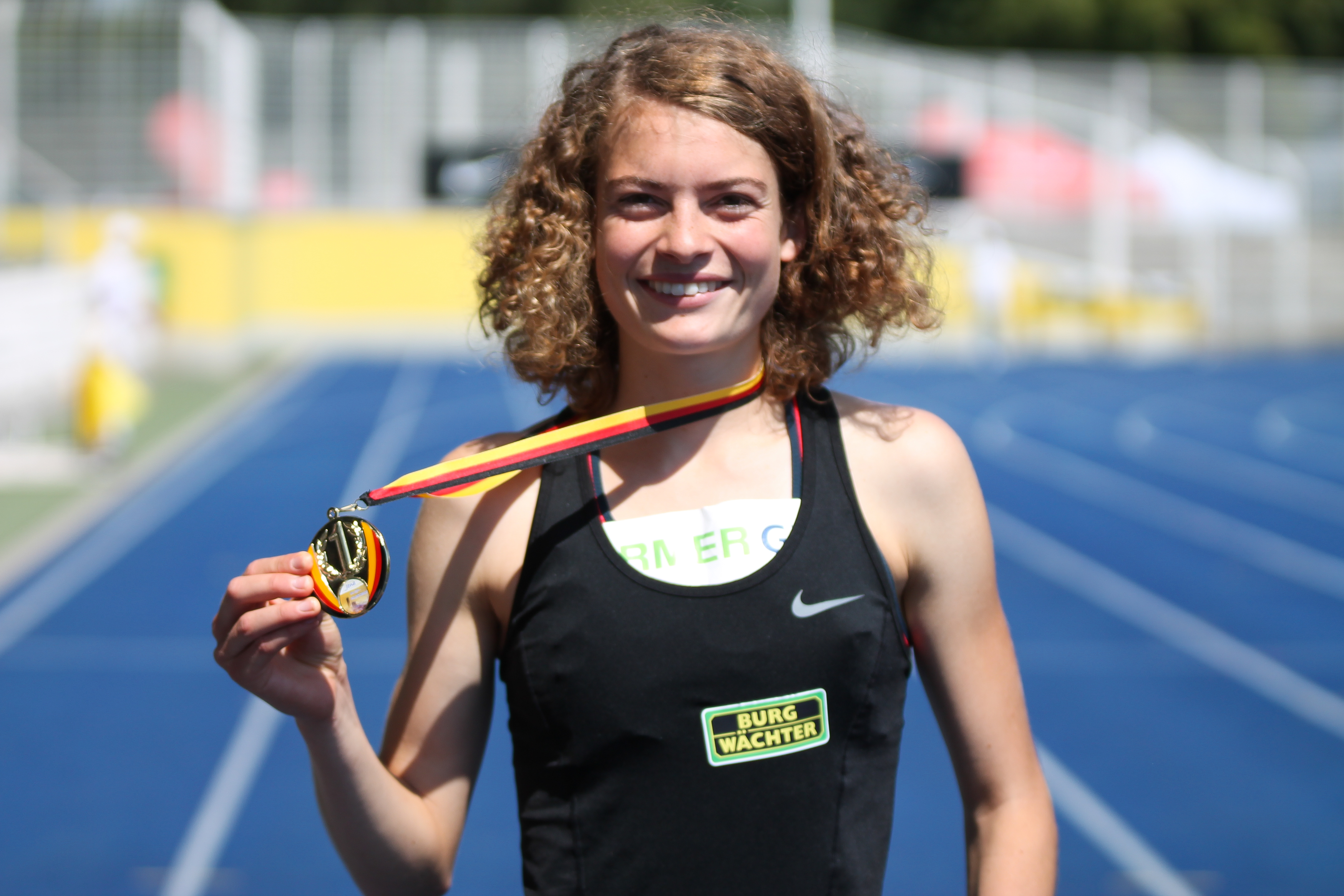
Reh at the 2015 German Under-20 Championships held in Jena.

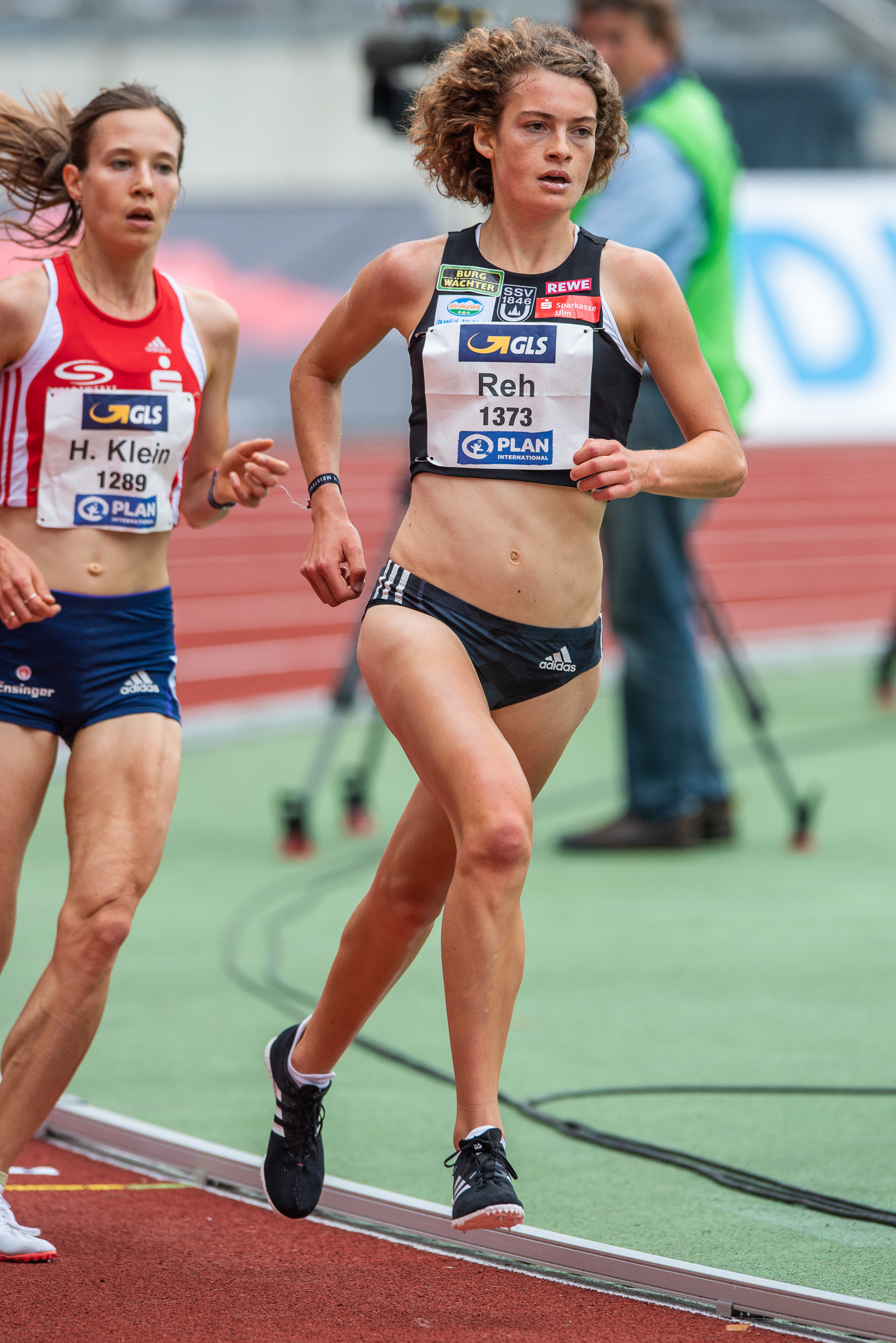
Alina Reh at the 2018 German Championships in Nuremberg.

=== International competitions ===
Representing Germany
Year	Competition	Venue	Position	Event	Result
2013	World Youth Championships	Donetsk, Ukraine	5th	3000 m	9:20.99
2013	European Cross Country Championships	Belgrade, Serbia	5th	XC 4.0 km U20	13:34
2013	European Cross Country Championships	Belgrade, Serbia	5th	U20 Team	95 pts
2014	European Youth Olympic Trials	Baku, Azerbaijan	1st	3000 m	9:26.52
2014	Youth Olympic Games	Nanjing, China	2nd	3000 m	9:05.07
2014	Youth Olympic Games	Nanjing, China	58th (h)	Medley relay	1:54.39
2014	European Cross Country Championships	Samokov, Bulgaria	4th	XC 3.857 km U20	14:34
2014	European Cross Country Championships	Samokov, Bulgaria	3rd	U20 Team	74 pts
2015	European Junior Championships	Eskilstuna, Sweden	1st	3000 m	9:12.29
2015	European Junior Championships	Eskilstuna, Sweden	1st	5000 m	16:02.01
2015	European Cross Country Championships	Hyères, France	3rd	XC 4.157 km U20	13:20
2015	European Cross Country Championships	Hyères, France	1st	U20 Team	20 pts
2016	World U20 Championships	Bydgoszcz, Poland	9th	5000 m	15:41.62 NU20R
2016	European Cross Country Championships	Chia, Italy	4th	XC 4.06 km U20	12:53
2016	European Cross Country Championships	Chia, Italy	2nd	U20 Team	57 pts
2017	European Indoor Championships	Belgrade, Serbia	8th	3000 m	8:57.87
2017	European Team Championships Super League	Lille, France	3rd	5000 m	15:32.50
2017	European U23 Championships	Bydgoszcz, Poland	2nd	5000 m	15:10.57 PB
2017	World Championships	London, United Kingdom	17th (h)	5000 m	15:10.01 PB
2017	European Cross Country Championships	Šamorín, Slovakia	1st	XC 6.28 km U23	20:22
2017	European Cross Country Championships	Šamorín, Slovakia	2nd	U23 Team	15 pts
2018	European Championships	Berlin, Germany	3rd	10,000 m	32:28.48
2019	European Indoor Championships	Glasgow, United Kingdom	4th	3000 m	8:39.45 PB
2019	European U23 Championships	Gävle, Sweden	2nd	5000 m	15:11.25
2019	European U23 Championships	Gävle, Sweden	1st	10,000 m	31:39.34
2019	World Championships	Doha, Qatar	–	10,000 m	DNF
2021	European Cross Country Championships	Dublin, Ireland	3rd	XC 8.0 km	26:53
2021	European Cross Country Championships	Dublin, Ireland	2nd	Senior Team	29 pts
2022	European 10,000m Cup	Pacé, France	2nd	10,000 m	31:39.86 SB
2022	World Championships	Eugene, OR, United States	17th (h)	5000 m	15:13.92
2022	European Championships	Munich, Germany	–	5000 m	DNF
2022	European Championships	Munich, Germany	8th	10,000 m	32:14.02
2022	European Cross Country Championships	Turin, Italy	3rd	XC 7.662 km	27:19
2022	European Cross Country Championships	Turin, Italy	1st	Senior Team	9 pts

=== National championships ===
- German Athletics Championships
  - 5000 metres: 2015, 2020, 2022
  - 10,000 metres: 2019, 2022
- German Indoor Athletics Championships
  - 3000 metres: 2017

=== Personal bests ===
- 1500 metres – 4:14.64 (Regensburg 2016)
- 1500 metres indoor – 4:13.71 (Dortmund 2019)
- 3000 metres – 9:05.07 (Nanjing 2014) NU18R
- 3000 metres indoor – 8:39.45 (Glasgow 2019)
- 5000 metres – 15:04.10 (Stockholm 2019)
- 10,000 metres – 31:19.87 (Essen 2019)

Road

- 5 kilometres – 15:22 (Berlin 2020)
- 10 kilometres – 31:23 (Berlin 2018)
- Half marathon – 1:09:31 (Cologne 2018)
