= 2017 European Athletics U23 Championships – Women's 10,000 metres =

The women's 10,000 metres event at the 2017 European Athletics U23 Championships was held in Bydgoszcz, Poland, at Zdzisław Krzyszkowiak Stadium on 14 July.

== Records ==
Prior to the competition, the records were as follows:

European U23 record	Yasemin Can (TUR)	30:26.41	Rio de Janeiro, Brazil	12 August 2016
Championship U23 record	Layes Abdullayeva (AZE)	32:18.05	Ostrava, Czech Republic	15 July 2011

== Results ==
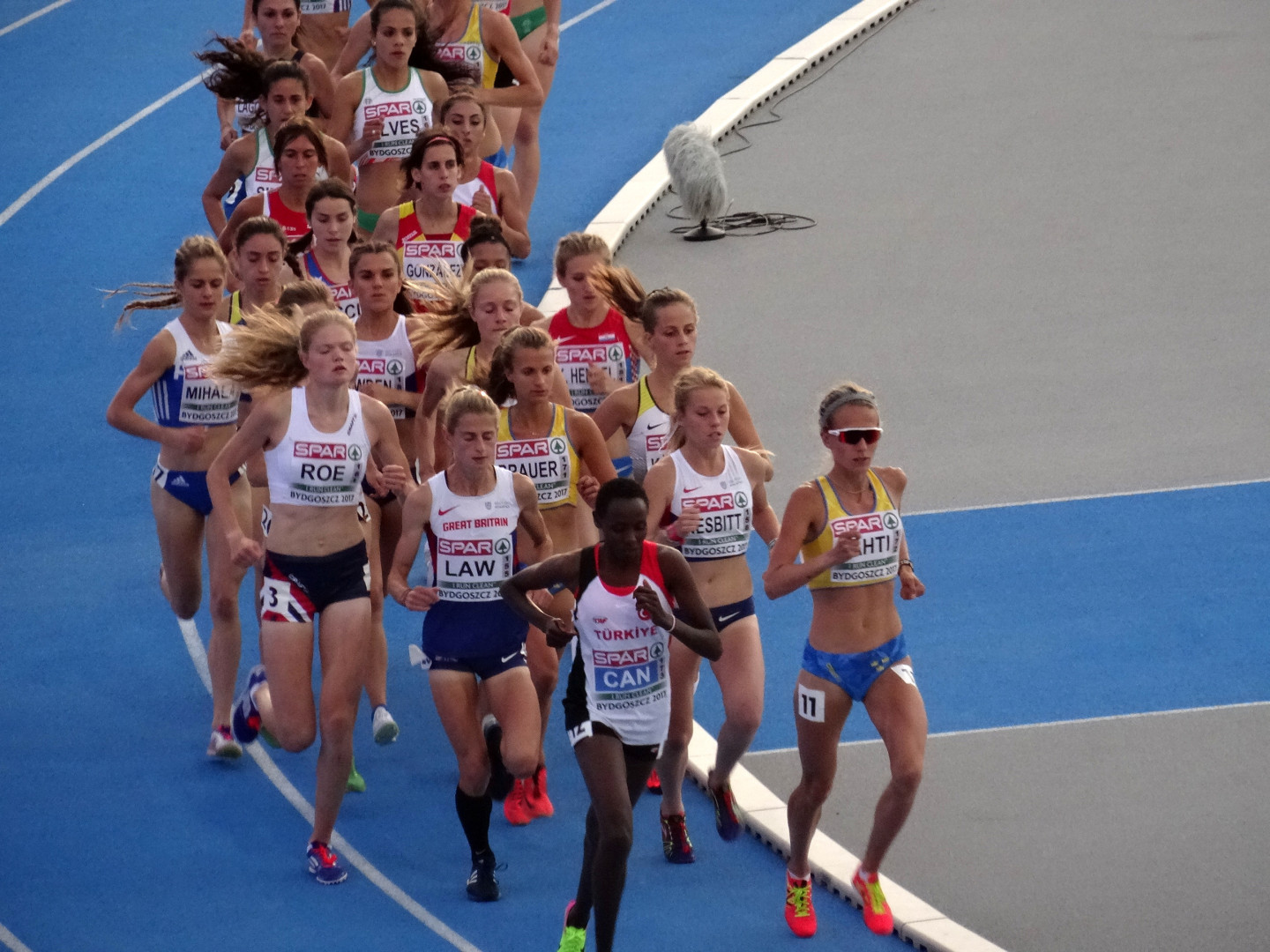
The race underway

Rank	Name	Nationality	Time	Notes
1st place, gold medalist(s)	Yasemin Can	Turkey	31:39.80	CR
2nd place, silver medalist(s)	Sarah Lahti	Sweden	32:46.91	
3rd place, bronze medalist(s)	Büsra Nur Koku	Turkey	33:33.22	
4	Phoebe Law	Great Britain	33:40.75	
5	Maryna Nemchenko	Ukraine	33:44.13	PB
6	Jenny Nesbitt	Great Britain	33:50.37	
7	Andreea Alina Piscu	Romania	33:51.53	PB
8	Philippa Bowden	Great Britain	34:04.57	
9	Mariann Roe	Norway	34:13.77	PB
10	Isabelle Brauer	Sweden	34:14.12	
11	Tatjana Schulte	Germany	34:15.15	PB
12	Valeriya Zinenko	Ukraine	34:20.21	PB
13	Irini-ria Mihala	Greece	35:04.60	PB
14	Tubay Erdal	Turkey	35:04.87	PB
15	Kristina Hendel	Croatia	35:20.98	
16	Rute Simões	Portugal	35:25.33	PB
17	Evelyne Dietschi	Switzerland	35:29.24	PB
18	Flavia Stutz	Switzerland	35:41.54	
19	Paula González	Spain	35:56.04	
20	Helena Alves	Portugal	36:18.40	
21	Felicia Körner	Germany	36:23.58	
22	Zuzana Durcová	Slovakia	36:28.92	PB
23	Laura Guzelj Blatnik	Slovenia	37:22.04	
24	Lisa Bergdahl	Sweden	37:47.56	
	Sónia Ferreira	Portugal	DNF	
	Rodama Lagonidou	Cyprus	DNF	
