= 2017 European Athletics U23 Championships – Women's 5000 metres =

The women's 5000 metres event at the 2017 European Athletics U23 Championships was held in Bydgoszcz, Poland, at Zdzisław Krzyszkowiak Stadium on 16 July.

== Results ==
Rank	Name	Nationality	Time	Notes
1st place, gold medalist(s)	Yasemin Can	Turkey	15:01.67	CR
2nd place, silver medalist(s)	Alina Reh	Germany	15:10.57	PB
3rd place, bronze medalist(s)	Sarah Lahti	Sweden	15:14.17	SB
4	Emine Hatun Tuna	Turkey	16:03.90	PB
5	Lisa Rooms	Belgium	16:15.58	
6	Weronika Pyzik	Poland	16:15.84	
7	Moira Stewartowá	Czech Republic	16:16.83	
8	Carolin Kirtzel	Germany	16:16.94	
9	Andreea Alina Piscu	Romania	16:19.87	PB
10	Maryna Nemchenko	Ukraine	16:24.04	
11	Kristina Hendel	Croatia	16:33.90	PB
12	Claudia Estévez	Spain	16:47.08	
	Anna Gehring	Germany	DNS	
