= 2019 European Athletics U23 Championships – Women's 10,000 metres =

The women's 10,000 metres event at the 2019 European Athletics U23 Championships was held in Gävle, Sweden, at Gavlehof Stadium Park on 12 July.

== Results ==
Rank	Name	Nationality	Time	Notes
1st place, gold medalist(s)	Alina Reh	Germany	31:39.34	
2nd place, silver medalist(s)	Miriam Dattke	Germany	32:29.45	PB
3rd place, bronze medalist(s)	Jasmijn Lau	Netherlands	33:35.66	
4	Yayla Kiliç	Turkey	33:41.14	
5	Emeline Delanis	France	33:48.64	PB
6	Julia Paternain	Great Britain	33:51.31	
7	Viktoriia Shkurko	Ukraine	33:55.55	
8	Leah Hanle	Germany	34:02.54	
9	Nuran Satilmis	Turkey	34:08.71	
10	Nerea Izcue	Spain	34:42.51	PB
11	Bohdana Semyonova	Ukraine	34:54.29	
12	Anna Máté	Hungary	34:57.36	PB
13	Mariia Mazurenko	Ukraine	35:07.71	PB
14	Flóra Bicsák	Hungary	35:09.75	PB
15	Manuela Martins	Portugal	35:14.16	PB
16	Klaara Leponiemi	Finland	35:29.15	
17	Irini-Ria Mihala	Greece	35:39.98	SB
18	Siobhra O'Flaherty	Ireland	35:45.89	
19	Katarina Vukančić	Croatia	35:54.88	
20	Andrea Kolbeinsdóttir	Iceland	36:04.22	
21	Sara Duarte	Portugal	36:09.55	PB
22	Claire Fagan	Ireland	37:06.48	
	Helena Alves	Portugal	DNF	
