= Athletics at the 2015 Summer Universiade – Women's half marathon =

The women's half marathon event at the 2015 Summer Universiade was held on 12 July at the Gwangju Universiade Main Stadium.

== Medalists ==
=== Individual ===
Gold	Silver	Bronze
Zhang Yingying; China	Nanako Kanno; Japan	Yuta Takahashi; Japan

=== Team ===
Gold	Silver	Bronze
Japan; Nanako Kanno; Ayumi Uehara; Maki Izumida; Sakurako Fukuuchi	China; Zhang Yingying; Zhang Meixia; Xiao Huinin	Turkey; Nilay Ersun; Şeyma Yıldız; Yasemin Can; Elif Tozlu; Burcu Büyükbezgin

== Results ==
=== Individual ===
Rank	Name	Nationality	Time	Notes
1st place, gold medalist(s)	Zhang Yingying	China	1:15:06	
2nd place, silver medalist(s)	Nanako Kanno	Japan	1:15:24	
3rd place, bronze medalist(s)	Ayumi Uehara	Japan	1:15:35	
4	Maki Izumida	Japan	1:16:09	
5	Nilay Ersun	Turkey	1:16:57	
6	Munkhzaya Bayartsogt	Mongolia	1:17:19	SB
7	Sakurako Fukuuchi	Japan	1:17:44	
8	Kathya García	Mexico	1:18:08	
9	Seyma Yildiz	Turkey	1:18:21	
10	Zhang Meixia	China	1:19:22	
11	Yasemin Can	Turkey	1:20:18	
12	Xiao Huimin	China	1:20:47	
13	Hanane Oubaali	Morocco	1:21:32	
14	Elif Tozlu	Turkey	1:22:18	
15	Janet Okeago	Kenya	1:25:52	
16	Thembi Baloyi	South Africa	1:28:02	
17	Laune Meyer	South Africa	1:28:46	
18	Grete Tonne	Estonia	1:29:25	PB
19	Thembeka Ngwenya	South Africa	1:29:32	
20	Murendwa Davhana	South Africa	1:30:41	
21	Burcu Büyükbezgin	Turkey	1:34:50	
22	Marcelat Sakobi	Democratic Republic of the Congo	1:35:33	
23	Smah Al-Najjar	Jordan	1:40:26	
	Sakie Arai	Japan	DNF	
	Faith Keitany	Kenya	DNF	

=== Team ===
Rank	Team	Time	Notes
1st place, gold medalist(s)	Japan	3:47:09	
2nd place, silver medalist(s)	China	3:55:15	
3rd place, bronze medalist(s)	Turkey	3:55:37	
4	South Africa	4:26:21	
