= Eilish McColgan =

Scottish runner (born 1990)

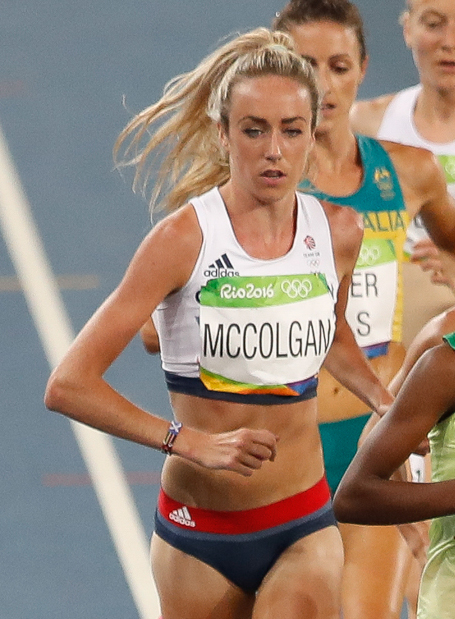
- McColgan at the 2016 Rio Olympics

Personal information
- Born: 25 November 1990 (age 35) Dundee, Scotland
- Height: 1.74 m (5 ft 9 in)
- Weight: 53 kg (117 lb)

Sport
- Country: Great Britain; Scotland
- Sport: Athletics
- Events: Middle-, long-distance running Steeplechase
- Club: Dundee Hawkhill Harriers
- Coached by: Liz McColgan

Achievements and titles
- Personal bests: 3000 m: 8:31.00 (2017); 5000 m: 14:28.55 NR (2021); 10,000 m: 30:00.86 NR (2023); 3000 m SC: 9:35.82 (2013); Road; 5 km: 14:45 NR (2022); 10 km: 30:08 AR (2026); 15 km: 47:12 NRS (2022); 10 miles: 50:43 AB (2021); 20 km: 1:03:06 NRS (2022); Half marathon: 1:05:43 NR (2023)
Medal record
Event	1st	2nd	3rd
Commonwealths	1	1	0
European Outdoors	0	2	1
European Indoors	0	0	1
Total	1	3	2
Women's athletics
Representing Great Britain
European Championships
Silver medal – second place	2018 Berlin	5000 m
Silver medal – second place	2022 Munich	10,000 m
Bronze medal – third place	2022 Munich	5000 m
European Indoor Championships
Bronze medal – third place	2017 Belgrade	3000 m
European 10,000m Cup
Gold medal – first place	2021 Birmingham	10,000 m
Bronze medal – third place	2019 London	10,000 m
Representing Scotland
Commonwealth Games
Gold medal – first place	2022 Birmingham	10,000 m
Silver medal – second place	2022 Birmingham	5000 m

Eilish McColgan (born 25 November 1990) is a Scottish middle- and long-distance runner. She is the 2022 Commonwealth Games 10,000 metres champion with the Games record, and 5000 metres silver medallist. McColgan is a four-time European Championships medallist, winning silver medals for the 5000 m in 2018 and 10,000 m in 2022, bronze in the 5000 m in 2022, and a bronze for the indoor 3000 metres in 2017. She is the European record holder for the 10 km road race, and the British record holder for the 5000 m, 10,000 m, 5 km and half marathon. She also holds the European best in the 10 miles on the roads.

McColgan represented Great Britain at the 2012 London, 2016 Rio, 2020 Tokyo, and 2024 Paris Olympics. She represented Scotland at Commonwealth Games in 2014 in Glasgow, in 2018 in Gold Coast in addition to the 2022 Games in Birmingham. She is the Scottish record holder in the event she originally specialised in, the 3000 metres steeplechase, from 2013 before injury forced her to move away from steeplechase. She holds the Scottish record in 10,000 metres. McColgan is a seven-time national champion.

== Early and personal life ==
Eilish McColgan was born in Dundee, Scotland to Liz and Peter McColgan, both athletes. She is a member of Dundee's Hawkhill Harriers Club and is coached by her mother, former 10,000 metres World Champion and Olympic silver medallist Elizabeth Nuttall known more commonly during her racing career as Liz McColgan.

She attended the High School of Dundee and studied mathematics and accountancy at the University of Dundee, graduating in 2013. She supports Dundee United F.C.

Following her mother's second marriage, McColgan is step-daughter of long-distance runner John Nuttall and step-sister of his son, para-athlete Luke Nuttall and daughter, athlete Hannah Nuttall. Her partner is former international middle-distance runner for Great Britain and England Michael Rimmer.

In 2019, her home in East Didsbury was the target of a burglary while she was away on training. McColgan reported the house was "completely ransacked", with numerous priceless materials stolen in the burglary, with McColgan also criticizing the police response to her report.

In 2025, McColgan announced her engagement with her partner Michael Rimmer following her London Marathon debut.

== Career ==
=== 2006–2019 ===
In 2006, she won a silver medal at the Scottish Schools Championships in the 1500 metres and a bronze medal at the International Under-17s Schools Championships. In 2007, she came fifth in the Scottish Senior Championships 1500 metres. At the 2008 Scottish Indoor Championships she won a bronze medal in the 1500 m.

McColgan was selected for the 2008 Commonwealth Youth Games in India but suffered a major knee injury which took her a year-and-a-half to recover from. In 2011, she came fourth in the 1500 metres at the 2011 UK Indoor Championships. She won the gold medal in the 1500 m at the 2011 Scottish University Championships. Her senior debut for Great Britain came at the 2011 European Team Championships in Stockholm, Sweden. Initially selected as a travelling reserve to cover a range of events, she was called upon to compete in the 3000 metres steeplechase, an event which she had only competed in twice before, and ran a personal best of 9:55.13 while finishing ninth. She went on to won the silver medal in the 5000 metres at the UK Outdoor Championships. However, McColgan missed the 2011 World Championships, held in Daegu, South Korea, after breaking her foot at the London Diamond League.

McColgan won two gold medals at the 2012 Scottish Universities Indoor Championships, placing first in both the 1500 and 3000 metres events. In June 2012 at a meeting in Oslo, Norway she ran a time of 9:38.45 to beat the Olympic 'A' qualification standard in the 3000 metres steeplechase. McColgan confirmed her qualification for the steeplechase at the 2012 Summer Olympics in London by winning the British trials in a time of 9:56.90. She was the only athlete to finish in under 10 minutes and the only British athlete to have achieved the 'A' qualifying standard. After achieving Olympic qualification, McColgan chose not to compete at the 2012 European Athletics Championships in Helsinki, Finland. She competed for Great Britain team at the 2012 Summer Olympics in the women's 3000 m steeplechase alongside compatriot Barbara Parker. Her time of 9:54.36 was not sufficient for her to reach the final.

At the 2013 World Championships in Moscow, McColgan made the final in the 3000 m steeplechase, finishing 10th. Having competed in the steeplechase at the 2014 Glasgow Commonwealth Games and finished sixth, the Dundonian switched from the barriers to the flat following a broken ankle, which prevented her from competing in the 2015 season.

She placed second over 5000 m at the 2016 British Championships, securing her place at the 2016 Olympic Games in Rio de Janeiro, where she reached the final of the women's 5000 metres.

In 2017, McColgan won over 3000 m and placed second over 1500 m at the British Indoor Championships, qualifying her for the European Indoor Championships in Belgrade, where she won bronze over 3000 m. She placed tenth over 5000 m at the London World Championships, having set a personal best of 15:00.38 in the heats. A few weeks later, McColgan improved that personal best and set a new Scottish record in finishing eighth at the Brussels Diamond League.

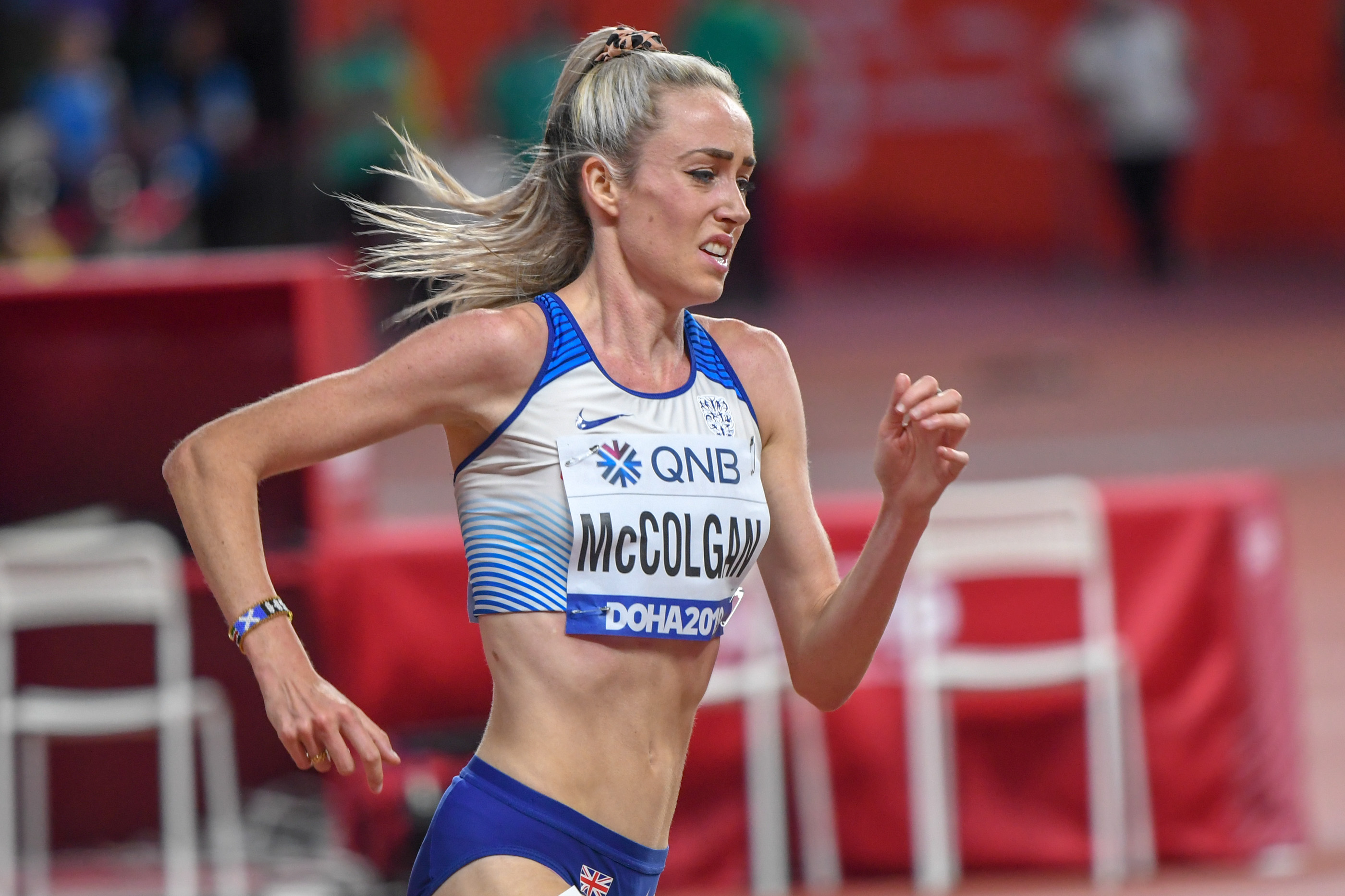
McColgan at the 2019 World Athletics Championships in Doha

McColgan opened her 2018 season by winning at the Doha 10 km in a personal best of 31:53. She qualified for the 3000 metres at the 2018 World Indoor Championships where she finished in a tenth. In the 5000 metres event at the 2018 European Championships in Berlin, she won the silver medal. In October, she won the Great South Run in Portsmouth, clocking 54:43 in her maiden run at the 10 mile distance. Her mother had won the race twice previously, in 1995 and 1997.

In 2019, her training regime included a daily run, cross training and a track session twice a week. On 9 June, she set a new Scottish record of 14:47.94 over 5000 m at the FBK Games. The Scotswoman finished tenth in the 5000 m event at the 2019 World Athletics Championships held in Doha, setting another Scottish record of 14:46.17. On 20 October, she retained her Great South Run title, setting a personal best of 51:38.

=== 2021 ===
On 24 April, McColgan won the 5000 m at the USATF Grand Prix in a time of 14:52.55. She also won over 10,000 m at the European 10,000 m Cup in a time of 31:19.35. On 1 July in Oslo, McColgan set a British 5000 m record with her time of 14:28.55, beating the 17-year mark of Paula Radcliffe.

At the delayed 2020 Tokyo Olympics in Japan, she failed to advance to the 5000 m final on 30 July, finishing in 10th place of her heat in a time of 15:09.68. A few days later, she also competed in the 10,000 m event, finishing ninth in the final with a time of 31:04.46.

In September, she finished runner-up to Hellen Obiri in the half marathon at the Great North Run in 67:48, and won the 10 km race at the Great Manchester Run in a new personal best of 30:52.

After a long track season, on 17 October, McColgan won her third consecutive Great South Run title in a time of 50:43, breaking Sonia O'Sullivan's course record and the European best mark for the 10 miles. She took almost half a minute off Radcliffe's UK record, and two seconds off the previous European best held by Israel's Lonah Chemtai Salpeter. Thus, McColgan improved on double win of her mother.

=== 2022 ===
In February, the Dundonian set a new British record in the 5 km road race, clocking 14:48 in Dubai to break the mark of 14:51 set by Paula Radcliffe in 2003. McColgan bettered her mother's unofficial 14:57 from 1991, and was only four seconds short of a European record. Later that month, she beat Radcliffe's 21-year-old British half marathon record by 21 seconds, in a time of 1:06.26, improving her mother's best yet again (1:07:11).

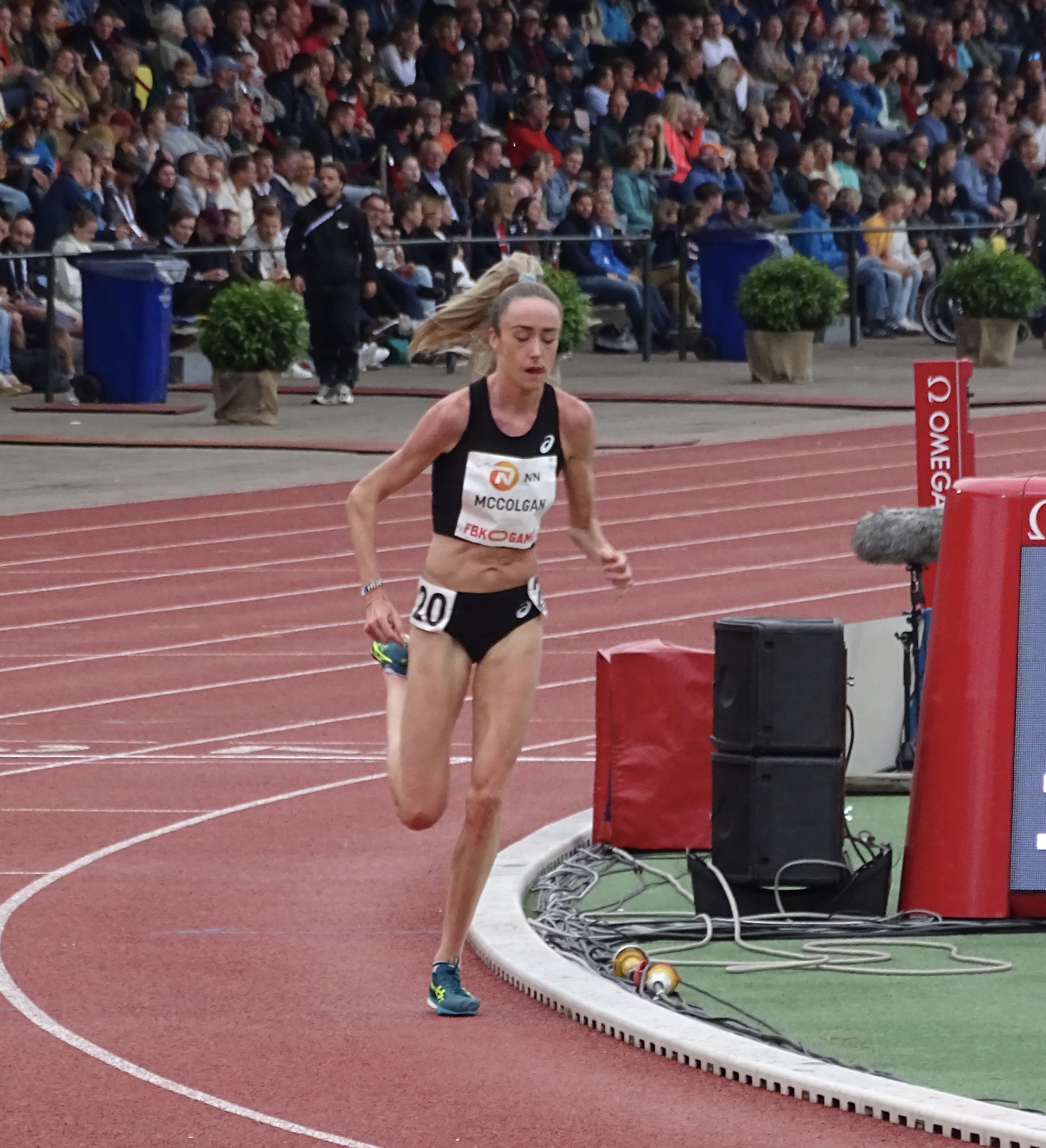
Eilish McColgan on her way to a new Scottish 10,000 m record at the 2022 FBK Games in Hengelo

In March, McColgan launched a non-profit organisation Giving Back to Track with her partner Michael Rimmer with the aim to encourage young people to get involved in athletics and to fund the next generation of female athletes.

In May, she broke Radcliffe's European 10 km record at the Great Manchester Run in a time of 30 minutes 19 seconds, shaving two seconds off the previous marker set by Radcliffe in 2003. McColgan finished second behind only Hellen Obiri who set the course record of 30:15. In June at the FBK Games in Hengelo, she set a new Scottish 10,000 m record of 30:19.02, beating the time set by her mother at the same venue in 1991.

After experiencing some health problems before the World Championships in Eugene, Oregon in July, McColgan finished 11th in the 5000 metres and 10th over the 10,000 metres.

On 3 August, the 31-year-old claimed the first major title of her career as she won the gold medal in the 10,000 metres final at the Commonwealth Games in Birmingham. Her winning time of 30:48:60 was a new Games record, breaking her mother's 32-year mark. Thus, she completed the family hat-trick as her mother won over the same distance at Commonwealth Games Edinburgh 1986 and Auckland 1990. McColgan later added silver in the 5000 metres, which marked Scotland's 500th overall medal at the Commonwealth Games.

The Dundonian continued her outstanding season at about a week later securing two additional medals at the 2022 European Championships in Munich. First she won a silver in the 10,000 metres (behind Yasemin Can), and added bronze for the 5000 metres three days later (behind Konstanze Klosterhalfen and Can), becoming the first British distance runner to compete in six championship outdoor finals in the same season.

In September, McColgan set a course record and the joint-fourth fastest women's half marathon in British history at The Big Half in London with a time of 67:35. She improved the previous best mark by more than two minutes.

She had to withdraw from the 2022 London Marathon due to 'rebound hypoglycemia' refuelling problems. McColgan improved her own European 10 kilometres record by a second, when winning at the Great Scottish Run in Glasgow in October. However, the record set in Glasgow was invalidated when it was found that the course was 150 m short. In November, she set a new British record in the 15 kilometres with her fourth-place finish in a time of 47:40 at the Zevenheuvelenloop in Netherlands, breaking her mother's official record of 47:43.

=== 2023 ===
On 4 March, after five weeks of altitude training in Colorado, McColgan broke Radcliffe's 21-year British 10,000 m record by 0.23 s with a time of 30:00.86 at the Sound Running The TEN in San Juan Capistrano, California. In Europe only Sifan Hassan had run faster. On 2 April, the Scotswoman chopped 43 seconds from her British half marathon record set 14 months earlier, clocking the second-fastest female non-African mark in history of 1:05:43 for a win at the Berlin Half Marathon. She became the first British woman to win the competition. Later that month, she again missed her debut over the classic marathon distance in London due to a knee injury.

=== 2024 ===
McColgan made her comeback from injury on 26 May, as she won the Österreichischer Frauenlauf 5 km in Wien with a time of 15:19. However, she was unable to finish the 10,000 m at the European Athletics Championships.

At the 2024 Summer Olympics in Paris, McColgan finished fifteenth in the 10,000 m. She won on her return to the half marathon, taking victory at The Big Half in 1:09.14. On 8 September, McColgan competed over the same distance at the Great North Run, finishing fifth in 1:07.45.

=== 2025 ===
On 27 April McColgan made her long-awaited marathon debut at the 2025 London Marathon, placing 8th in 2:24:25 as the top British finisher. On 21 July McColgan was announced as the first Games Ambassador for the 2026 Commonwealth Games, which is set to be hosted in Glasgow.

=== 2026 ===
On 11 January McColgan regained the women's European 10 km record at the 10K Valencia, with a time of 30:08, recapturing the record from Jana Van Lent

In July, ahead of the 2026 Commonwealth Games in Glasgow, McColgan's victory in the women's 10,000 metres at the 2022 Commonwealth Games was voted the "Greatest Commonwealth Games Moment" in a public poll organised by Commonwealth Sport.

== Achievements ==
=== Personal bests ===
Information from World Athletics profile unless otherwise noted.

- 1500 metres – 4:00.97 (Rabat 2019)
- One mile – 4:24.71 Birmingham (2019)
- 3000 metres – 8:31.00 (Birmingham 2017)
- 5000 metres – 14:28.55 (Oslo 2021) NR
- 10,000 metres – 30:00.86 (San Juan Capistrano, CA 2023) NR
- 3000 metres steeplechase – 9:35.82 (Moscow 2013) (NR Scottish)

Road

- 5 kilometres – 14:45 (Málaga 2022) Wo NR
- 10 kilometres – 30:08 (Valencia 2026) European record
- 10 miles – 50:43 (Portsmouth 2021) European best
- Half marathon – 1:05:43 (Berlin 2023) Mx NR
- Marathon - 2:24:25 (London 2025) (NR Scottish)

=== National titles ===
- British Athletics Championships
  - 5000 metres: 2019
  - 10,000 metres: 2021
  - 3000 m steeplechase: 2012, 2013, 2014
- British Indoor Athletics Championships
  - 1500 metres: 2018
  - 3000 metres: 2017
- Scottish Athletics Championships
  - 3000 m steeplechase: 2011

=== Competition record ===
Representing Great Britain & Scotland
Year	Competition	Venue	Position	Event	Time
2008	Commonwealth Youth Games	Pune, India	5th (h1)	1500 m	4:32.10
2008	Commonwealth Youth Games	Pune, India	8th	3000 m	9:58.42
2011	European Team Championships Super League	Stockholm, Sweden	9th	3000 m st.	9:55.13 PB
2011	European U23 Championships	Ostrava, Czech Republic	6th	3000 m st.	9:52.02
2012	Olympic Games	London, United Kingdom	30th (h)	3000 m st.	9:54.36
2013	World Championships	Moscow, Russia	10th	3000 m st.	9:37.33
2014	Commonwealth Games	Glasgow, United Kingdom	6th	3000 m st.	9:44.65 SB
2016	European Championships	Amsterdam, Netherlands	6th	5000 m	15:28.53
2016	Olympic Games	Rio de Janeiro, Brazil	13th	5000 m	15:12.09
2017	European Indoor Championships	Belgrade, Serbia	3rd	3000 m	8:47.43
2017	World Championships	London, United Kingdom	10th	5000 m	15:00.43
2018	World Indoor Championships	Birmingham, United Kingdom	20th (h)	1500 m	4:13.32
2018	World Indoor Championships	Birmingham, United Kingdom	10th	3000 m	9:01.32
2018	Commonwealth Games	Gold Coast, Australia	6th	1500 m	4:04.30
2018	Commonwealth Games	Gold Coast, Australia	6th	5000 m	15:34.88
2018	European Championships	Berlin, Germany	2nd	5000 m	14:53.05
2019	European Indoor Championships	Glasgow, United Kingdom	7th	3000 m	8:59.71
2019	European 10,000m Cup	London, United Kingdom	3rd	10,000 m	31:16.76 PB
2019	The Match Europe v USA	Minsk, Belarus	3rd	1500 m	4:05.58
2019	The Match Europe v USA	Minsk, Belarus	3rd	3000 m	9:01.03
2019	World Championships	Doha, Qatar	10th	5000 m	14:46.17 PB
2021	European 10,000m Cup	Birmingham, United Kingdom	1st	10,000 m	31:19.35
2021	Olympic Games	Tokyo, Japan	23rd (h)	5000 m	15:09.68
2021	Olympic Games	Tokyo, Japan	9th	10,000 m	31:04.46
2022	World Championships	Eugene, OR, United States	11th	5000 m	15:03.03
2022	World Championships	Eugene, OR, United States	10th	10,000 m	30:34.60
2022	Commonwealth Games	Birmingham, United Kingdom	2nd	5000 m	14:42.14 SB
2022	Commonwealth Games	Birmingham, United Kingdom	1st	10,000 m	30:48.60 GR
2022	European Championships	Munich, Germany	3rd	5000 m	14:59.34
2022	European Championships	Munich, Germany	2nd	10,000 m	30:41.05
2024	European Championships	Rome, Italy	–	10,000 m	DNF
2024	Olympic Games	Paris, France	15th	10,000 m	31:20.51 SB

== Awards and honours ==
2022

- British Athletics Writers' Association: Cliff Temple Award for British Female Athlete of the Year (jointly with Laura Muir)
- BT Sport Action Woman of the Year
- Sunday Times Sportswoman of the Year
- Sports Journalists' Association: SJA Committee Award
- British Athletics Supporters Club's Athlete of the Year
- Women's Sport Alliance Athlete of the Year
- Scottish Women in Sport Sportswoman of the Year
- Scottish Athletics Commonwealth Games Achievement Trophy
- Scottish Sports Awards: Moment of the Year
- Athletics Weekly: British Female Athlete of the Year
- University of Dundee Honorary Doctor of Laws degree
