= Sarah Lahti =

Swedish middle-distance runner

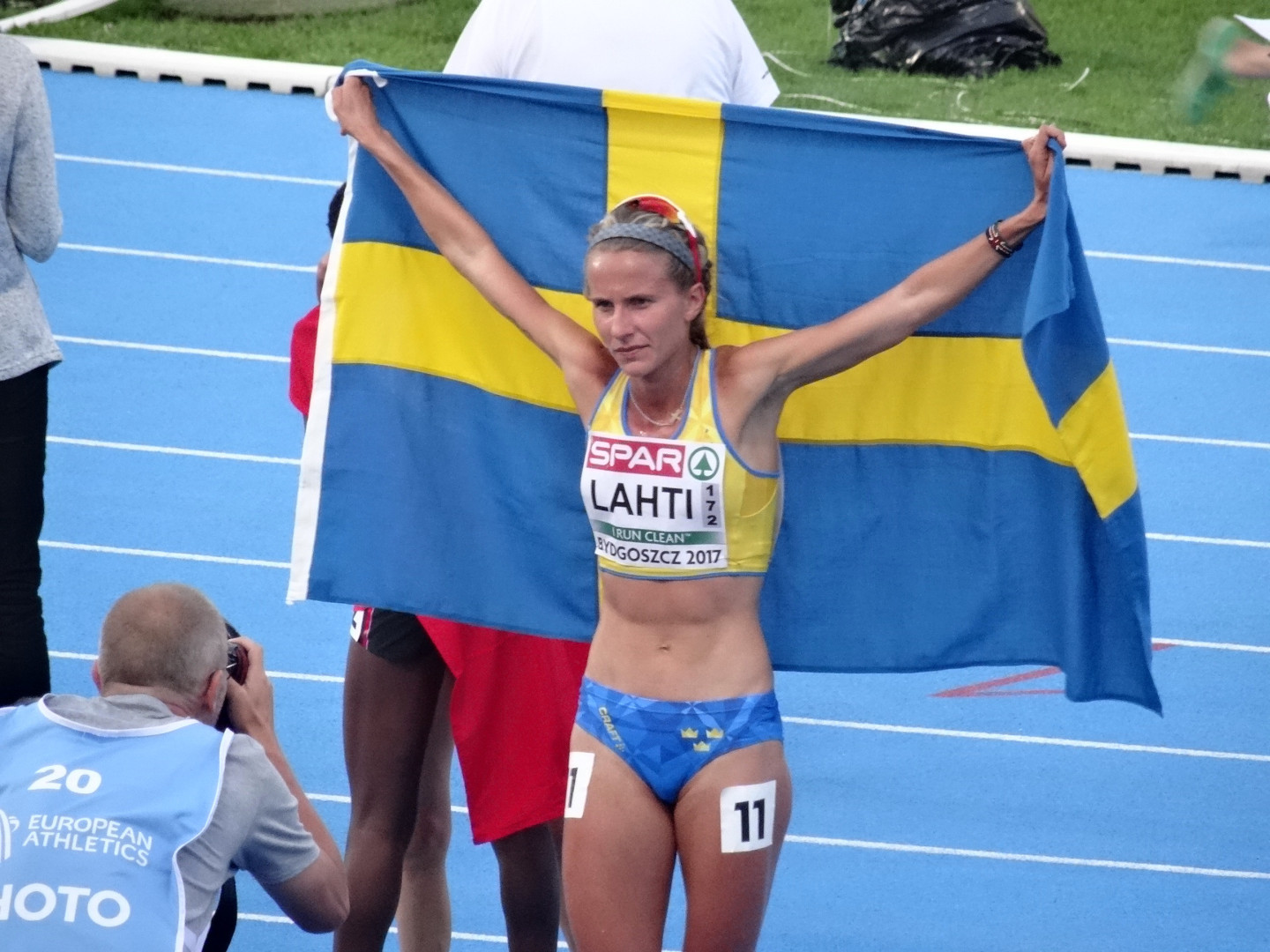
- Sarah Lahti in 2017

Personal information
- Born: 18 February 1995 (age 31) Klippan, Sweden
- Height: 1.77 m (5 ft 10 in)
- Weight: 57 kg (126 lb)

Sport
- Sport: Track and field
- Event: 1500 metres
- Club: Hässelby SK

Sarah Lahti (born 18 February 1995) is a Swedish middle-distance runner. She competed in the 1500 metres at the 2016 IAAF World Indoor Championships without qualifying for the final. She is the current Swedish record holder in the half marathon, and previously held the Swedish record at 10,000 metres, which she set at the 2016 Summer Olympics.

== Competition record ==
Year	Competition	Venue	Position	Event	Notes
Representing Sweden
2012	World Junior Championships	Barcelona, Spain	33rd (h)	3000 m s'chase	11:23.61
2013	European Junior Championships	Rieti, Italy	–	3000 m	DNF
2014	World Junior Championships	Eugene, United States	–	5000 m	DNF
2016	World Indoor Championships	Portland, United States	14th (h)	1500 m	4:11.68
2016	European Championships	Amsterdam, Netherlands	9th	10,000 m	32:14.17
2016	Olympic Games	Rio de Janeiro, Brazil	12th	10,000 m	31:28.43 (NR)
2017	European U23 Championships	Bydgoszcz, Poland	3rd	5000 m	15:14.17
2017	European U23 Championships	Bydgoszcz, Poland	2nd	10,000 m	32:46.91
2017	World Championships	London, United Kingdom	–	10,000 m	DNF
2021	Olympic Games	Tokyo, Japan	–	10,000 m	DNF
2022	World Championships	Eugene, United States	22nd (h)	5000 m	15:26.05
2022	European Championships	Munich, Germany	14th	10,000 m	32:42:27
2023	World Championships	Budapest, Hungary	18th	10,000 m	33:09.22
2025	European Running Championships	Leuven, Belgium	6th	10 km	31:35
2025	World Championships	Tokyo, Japan	22nd (h)	5000 m	15:05.13

== Personal bests ==
Outdoor

- 3000 metres – 8:50.97 (Utrecht 2016)
- 5000 metres – 15:10.76 (Hengelo 2016)
- 10000 metres – 31:28.43 (Rio de Janeiro 2016, former national record)
- 3000 metres steeplechase – 10:32.61 (Hässleholm 2012)
- Half marathon - 1:09:52 (Dresden 2020, national record)

Indoor

- 1500 metres – 4:11.68 (Portland 2016)
- One mile – 4:30.42 (Stockholm 2016)
- 3000 metres – 9:01.16 (Växjö 2016)

== Personal life ==
Lahti is of Finnish descent through her grandfather, who as a child was evacuated from Finland to Sweden during World War II.
