= 2022 European Athletics Championships – Women's 10,000 metres =

Women's 10,000 metres at the 2022 European Athletics Championships
- Venue: Olympic Stadium
- Location: Munich
- Dates: August 16 (final)
- Competitors: 18 from 11 nations
- Winning time: 30:32.57

Medalists
gold medal	Yasemin Can	Turkey
silver medal	Eilish McColgan	Great Britain
bronze medal	Lonah Chemtai Salpeter	Israel

The women's 10,000 metres at the 2022 European Athletics Championships took place at the Olympic Stadium on 15 August.

== Records ==
Standing records prior to the 2022 European Athletics Championships
World record	Letesenbet Gidey (ETH)	29:01.03	Hengelo, Netherlands	8 June 2021
European record	Sifan Hassan (NED)	29:06.82	Hengelo, Netherlands	6 June 2021
Championship record	Paula Radcliffe (GBR)	30:01.09	Munich, Germany	6 August 2002
World Leading	Letesenbet Gidey (ETH)	30:09.94	Eugene, Oregon, United States	16 July 2022
European Leading	Sifan Hassan (NED)	30:10.56	Eugene, Oregon, United States	16 July 2022

== Schedule ==
Date	Time	Round
15 August 2022	21:48	Final

== Results ==
=== Final ===
Place	Athlete	Nation	Time	Notes
1st place, gold medalist(s)	Yasemin Can	Turkey	30:32.57	SB
2nd place, silver medalist(s)	Eilish McColgan	Great Britain	30:41.05	
3rd place, bronze medalist(s)	Lonah Chemtai Salpeter	Israel	30:46.37	NR
4	Konstanze Klosterhalfen	Germany	31:05.21	SB
5	Selamawit Teferi	Israel	31:24.03	SB
6	Samantha Harrison	Great Britain	31:46.87	
7	Valeriia Zinenko	Ukraine	31:55.60	PB
8	Alina Reh	Germany	32:14.02	
9	Camilla Richardsson	Finland	32:19.27	PB
10	Jessica Judd	Great Britain	32:23.98	
11	Silke Jonkman	Netherlands	32:30.92	
12	Alessia Zarbo	France	32:36.28	
13	Mekdes Woldu	France	32:39.54	
14	Sarah Lahti	Sweden	32:42:27	SB
15	Beatriz Álvarez	Spain	33:04.18	
16	Jasmijn Lau	Netherlands	33:14.00	SB
17	Maitane Melero	Spain	33:46.71	
18	Julia Mayer	Austria	33:57.29	
