= Miriam Dattke =

German runner (born 1998)

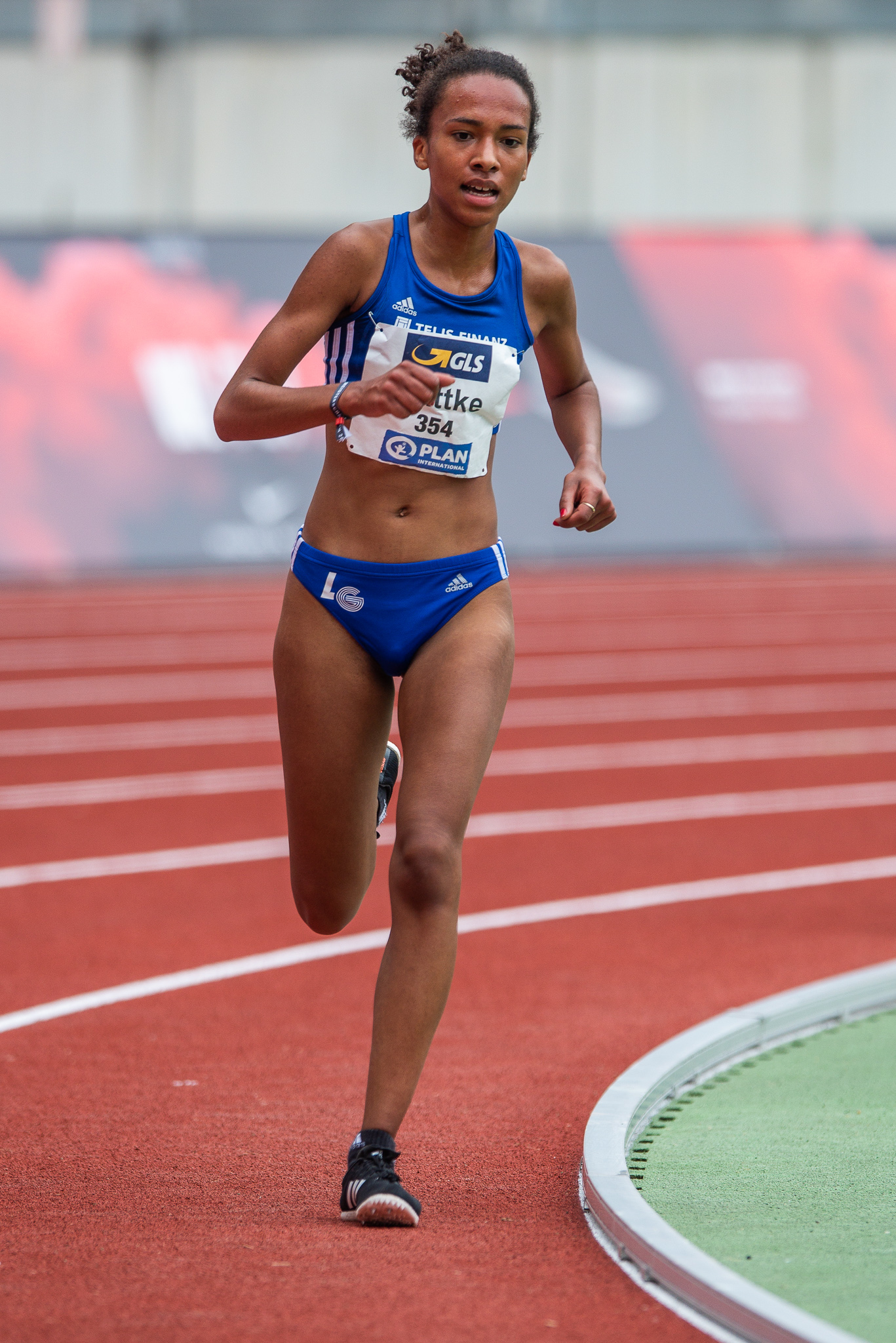
- Dattke at the 2018 German Athletics Championships in Nuremberg

Personal information
- Born: 24 June 1998 (age 28) Mannheim, Germany

Sport
- Country: Germany
- Sport: Athletics
- Event: Long-distance running
- Club: LG Telis Finanz Regensburg
- Coached by: Kurt Ring
Medal record
Women's athletics
Representing Germany
European U23 Championships
Silver medal – second place	2019 Gävle	10,000 m
European U20 Championships
Gold medal – first place	2017 Grosseto	5000 m

Miriam Dattke (born 24 June 1998) is a German long-distance runner. She won the silver medal in the 10,000 metres at the 2019 European Under-23 Championships. Dattke finished fourth in the women's marathon at the 2022 European Athletics Championships with same time as bronze medalist Nienke Brinkman.

She was the 2017 European U20 5000 metres champion. She won four German national titles.

== Personal life ==
Dattke was born in Mannheim, Germany to a German father and Rwandan mother.

== Statistics ==
=== Personal bests ===
- 5000 metres – 15:28.37 (Karlsruhe 2021)
- 10,000 metres – 31:10.21 (London 2023)

Road

- 5 kilometres – 15:47 (Herzogenaurach 2022)
- 10 kilometres – 31:38 (Berlin 2021)
- 15 kilometres – 50:31 ('s-Heerenberg 2023)
- Half marathon – 1:09:43 (Dresden 2020)
- Marathon – 2:26:50 (Sevilla 2022)

=== National titles ===
- 10 kilometres: 2019
- Half marathon: 2019, 2021, 2023
