= Yasemin Can =

Kenyan-Turkish long-distance runner

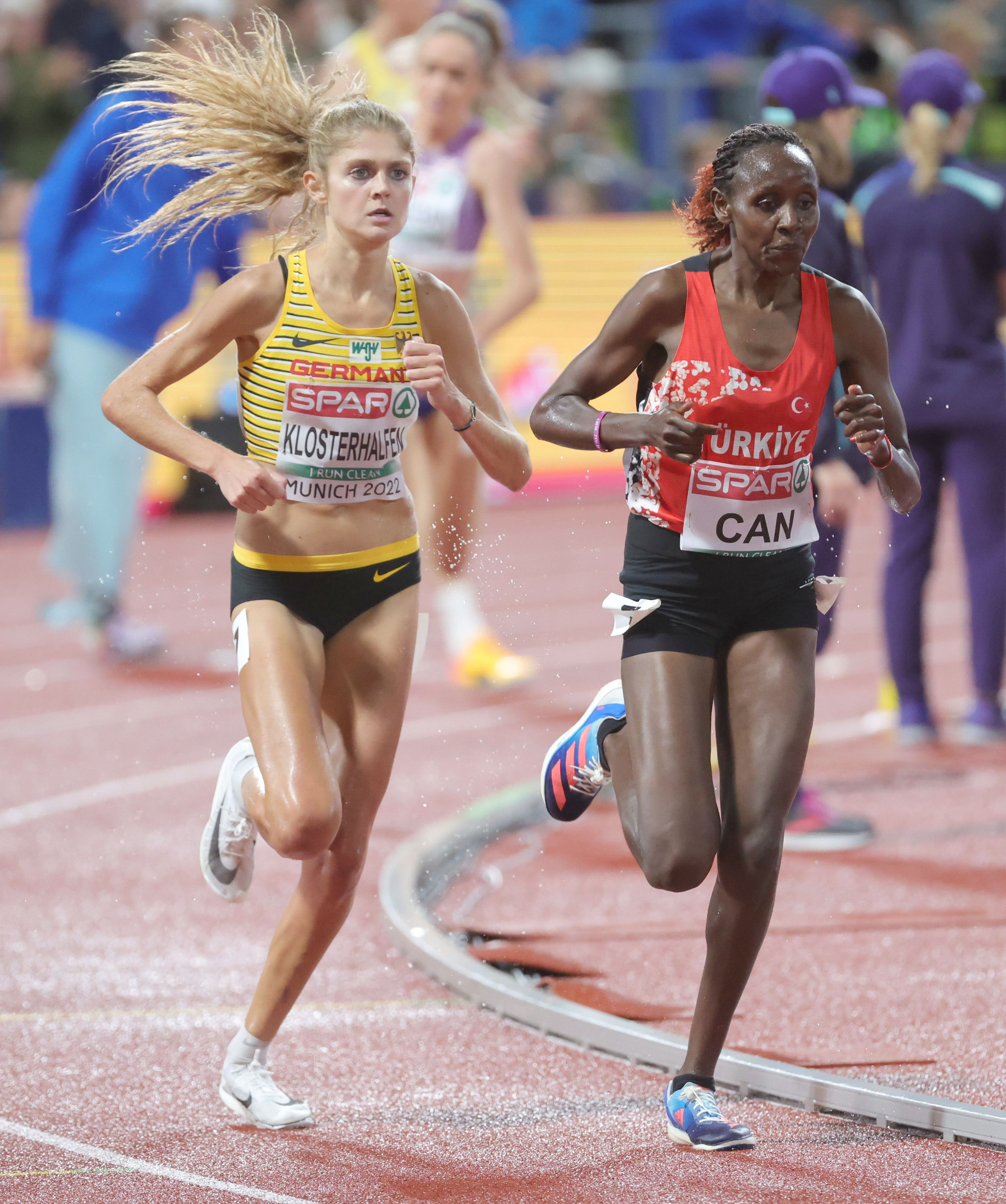
- Can (right) at the 2022 European Athletics Championships

Personal information
- Nationality: Kenyan; Turkish
- Born: Vivian Jemutai; 11 December 1996 (age 29) Nairobi, Kenya
- Height: 1.66 m (5 ft 5 in)
- Weight: 49 kg (108 lb)

Sport
- Country: Turkey
- Sport: Long-distance running
- Club: Enkaspor (Istanbul)

Achievements and titles
- Personal bests: 5000 m: 14:36.82 (2017); 10,000 m: 30:26.41 (2016)
Medal record
Women's athletics
Representing Turkey
European Championships
Gold medal – first place	2016 Amsterdam	5000 m
Gold medal – first place	2016 Amsterdam	10,000 m
Gold medal – first place	2022 Munich	10,000 m
Silver medal – second place	2022 Munich	5000 m
Bronze medal – third place	2018 Berlin	5000 m
European Indoor Championships
Silver medal – second place	2017 Belgrade	3000 m
Mediterranean Games
Gold medal – first place	2022 Oran	5000 m
Islamic Solidarity Games
Gold medal – first place	2017 Baku	10,000 m
Gold medal – first place	2021 Konya	5000 m
Gold medal – first place	2021 Konya	10,000 m
Silver medal – second place	2017 Baku	5000 m
European U23 Championships
Gold medal – first place	2017 Bydgoszcz	5000 m
Gold medal – first place	2017 Bydgoszcz	10,000 m
European Cross Country Championships
Gold medal – first place	2016 Chia	Senior race
Gold medal – first place	2017 Šamorín	Senior race
Gold medal – first place	2018 Tilburg	Senior race
Gold medal – first place	2019 Lisbon	Senior race
Bronze medal – third place	2016 Chia	Senior team
Bronze medal – third place	2017 Šamorín	Senior team
Bronze medal – third place	2024 Antalya	Senior Women
Bronze medal – third place	2025 Lagoa	Senior race

Yasemin Can (born Vivian Jemutai on 11 December 1996) is a Kenyan female long-distance runner representing Turkey who specialises in the 5000 metres and 10,000 metres. She is the reigning 10,000 m European champion. Can is a six-time European Championship medalist, including three gold medals and the 5000 m/10,000 m double in 2016, and a four-time European Cross Country champion.

She competed for Kenya before 13 March 2016, when she officially became eligible to represent Turkey at international competitions. Can is the Turkish record holder for the half marathon, and the Turkish indoor record holder for the 3000 m and 5000 m. She is a two-time Turkish champion.

== Career ==
Can earned a quota spot for the women's 5000 m event in the 2016 Rio Olympics running 15:08.46 at the Turkish Indoor Championships in Istanbul. She secured another quota spot for the 10,000 m event running 31:30.58 at the Turkish Championships in Mersin. She set a new European under-23 record with her time.

She took part at the Golden Gala leg of 2016 IAAF Diamond League in Rome, Italy, and placing sixth in the 5000 m in a time of 14:37.61.

Can won the gold medal in the women's 10,000 m at the 2016 European Athletics Championships in Amsterdam, Netherlands. Her time of 31:12.86 improved her own European U23 record by 18 seconds. She won her second gold medal in the 5000 m at the same championship.

At the 2016 Rio Olympics, she was a finalist in the fastest 10,000 m race in the history, placing seventh with a personal best time of 30:26.41.

On 5 March 2017, Can won a silver medal in the 3000 m at the 2017 European Athletics Indoor Championships in Belgrade behind Laura Muir.

Can won gold medals in the women's 10,000 m and 5000 m at the 2017 European Athletics U23 Championships in Bydgoszcz, Poland.

In 2020, she competed in the women's half marathon at the 2020 World Athletics Half Marathon Championships held in Gdynia, Poland.

On 15 August 2022, Can won the gold medal and regained her European 10,000 m title at Munich 2022, finishing in a time of 30:32.57. She placed second in the 5000 m behind Konstanze Klosterhalfen and ahead of Eilish McColgan three days later.

== Achievements ==
=== International competitions ===
Representing Turkey
Year	Competition	Venue	Position	Event	Result	Notes
2015	Universiade	Gwangju, South Korea	11th	Half marathon	1:20:18	
2015	Universiade	Gwangju, South Korea	3rd	Team	3:55:37	
2016	European Championships	Amsterdam, Netherlands	1st	5000 m	15:18.15	
2016	European Championships	Amsterdam, Netherlands	1st	10,000 m	31:12.86	EL
2016	Olympic Games	Rio de Janeiro, Brazil	6th	5000 m	14:56.96	
2016	Olympic Games	Rio de Janeiro, Brazil	7th	10,000 m	30:26.41	PB
2016	European Cross Country Championships	Chia, Italy	1st	Senior race	24:46	
2016	European Cross Country Championships	Chia, Italy	1st	Senior team	35 pts	
2017	European Indoor Championships	Belgrade, Serbia	2nd	3000 m i	8:43.46	NR
2017	Islamic Solidarity Games	Baku, Azerbaijan	2nd	5000 m	14:53.50	
2017	Islamic Solidarity Games	Baku, Azerbaijan	1st	10,000 m	31:18.20	GR
2017	European U23 Championships	Bydgoszcz, Poland	1st	5000 m	15:01.67	CR
2017	European U23 Championships	Bydgoszcz, Poland	1st	10,000 m	31:39.80	CR
2017	World Championships	London, United Kingdom	16th (h)	5000 m	15:08.20	
2017	World Championships	London, United Kingdom	11th	10,000 m	31:35.48	
2017	European Cross Country Championships	Šamorín, Slovakia	1st	Senior race	26:48	
2017	European Cross Country Championships	Šamorín, Slovakia	3rd	Senior team	54 pts	
2018	European Championships	Berlin, Germany	3rd	5000 m	14:57.63	SB
2018	European Championships	Berlin, Germany	4th	10,000 m	32:34.34	
2018	European Cross Country Championships	Tilburg, Netherlands	1st	Senior race	26:05	
2018	European Cross Country Championships	Tilburg, Netherlands	7th	Senior team	88 pts	
2019	European Cross Country Championships	Lisbon, Portugal	1st	Senior race	26:52	
2019	European Cross Country Championships	Lisbon, Portugal	4th	Senior team	53 pts	
2020	World Half Marathon Championships	Gdynia, Poland	7th	Half marathon	1:06:20	NR
2020	World Half Marathon Championships	Gdynia, Poland	6th	Team	3:31:39	
2021	Olympic Games	Tokyo, Japan	8th	5000 m	14:46.49	
2021	Olympic Games	Tokyo, Japan	11th	10,000 m	31:10.05	SB
2021	European Cross Country Championships	Dublin, Ireland	14th	Senior race	28:38	
2022	European 10,000 m Cup	Pacé, France	1st	10,000 m	31:20.18	EL
2022	European 10,000 m Cup	Pacé, France	2nd	Team	1:37:14.68	
2022	Mediterranean Games	Oran, Algeria	1st	5000 m	15:23.47	
2022	Islamic Solidarity Games	Konya, Turkey	1st	5000 m	16:23.1h	
2022	Islamic Solidarity Games	Konya, Turkey	1st	10,000 m	32:34.33	IRM
2022	European Championships	Munich, Germany	2nd	5000 m	14:56.91	
2022	European Championships	Munich, Germany	1st	10,000 m	30:32.57	SB
2022	European Cross Country Championships	Turin, Italy	–	Senior race	DNF	
2023	European Indoor Championships	Istanbul, Turkey	12th (h)	3000 m	9:01.34^{1}	
2025	European Running Championships	Leuven, Belgium	39th	10 km	33:07	

^{1}Did not finish in the final

=== Personal bests ===
- 3000 metres indoor – 8:43.46 (Belgrade 2017) NR

- 5000 metres – 14:36.82 (Rome 2017)
  - 5000 metres indoor – 15:08.46 (Istanbul 2016) NR
- 10,000 metres – 30:26.41 (Rio de Janeiro 2016)

Road

- 5 km – 15:23 (Herzogenaurach 2021) NB
- 10 km – 32:01 (Chon Buri 2020)
- Half marathon – 1:06:20 (Gdynia 2020) NR

=== National titles ===
- Turkish Athletics Championships
  - 10,000 metres: 2016
- Turkish Indoor Athletics Championships
  - 5000 metres: 2016
