= 2025 European 10,000m Cup =

- Organisers: European Athletics
- Edition: 27th
- Date: 24 May
- Host city: Pacé, Ille-et-Vilaine, France
- Venue: Complexe sportif Jean-Paul Chassebœuf
- Events: 2
- Participation: 70 athletes from 20 nations

The 27th edition of the European 10,000m Cup took place on 24 May 2025, in Pacé, France.

== Medallists ==
Event	Gold	Silver	Bronze
Individual
Men	(Republic of Ireland) Efrem Gidey; 27:40.47	(France) Valentin Gondouin; 27:41.95	(France) Felix Bour; 27:42.00
Women	(Belgium) Jana Van Lent; 31:32.28	(France) Alessia Zarbo; 31:50.62	(Belgium) Chloé Herbiet; 31:54.06
Team
Men	France; 1:23:30.67	Belgium; 1:24:51.35	Spain; 1:24:58.61
Women	Belgium; 1:36:02.12	Italy; 1:36:40.32	France; 1:37:40.49

== Results ==
=== Men's ===
Individual race
Rank	Heat	Athlete	Nationality	Time	Note
1st place, gold medalist(s)	A	Efrem Gidey	Ireland	27:40.47	
2nd place, silver medalist(s)	A	Valentin Gondouin	France	27:41.95	SB
3rd place, bronze medalist(s)	A	Felix Bour	France	27:42.00	SB
4	A	Simon Debognies	Belgium	27:48.40	PB
5	A	Eduardo Menacho	Spain	28:05.33	PB
6	A	Simon Bédard	France	28:06.72	SB
7	A	Baptiste Guyon	France	28:09.13	SB
8	A	Francesco Guerra	Italy	28:23.59	SB
9	A	Nils Voigt	Germany	28:25.33	
10	A	Juan Antonio Pérez	Spain	28:26.39	SB
11	A	Jesús Ramos	Spain	28:26.89	SB
12	B	Clément Deflandre	Belgium	28:30.91	PB
13	A	Aarón Las Heras	Spain	28:31.43	
14	A	Dorian Boulvin	Belgium	28:32.04	PB
15	A	Yohanes Chiappinelli	Italy	28:32.67	SB
16	B	Nassim Hassaous	Spain	28:32.79	SB
17	B	Luca Ursano	Italy	28:36.06	SB
18	B	Miguel Marques	Portugal	28:39.22	PB
19	B	Lukas Ehrle	Portugal	28:40.22	PB
20	B	Luca Alfieri	Italy	28:46.67	SB
21	A	Florian Le Pallec	France	29:00.69	
22	B	Oisín Ó Gailín	Ireland	29:02.05	SB
23	B	Guillaume Grimard	Belgium	29:03.25	SB
24	B	Vegard Vesterhaug Warnes	Norway	29:11.45	PB
25	B	Ivo Balabanov	Bulgaria	29:15.81	SB
26	B	Alfie Manthorpe	Great Britain	29:19.52	PB
27	B	Frank Futselaar	Netherlands	29:24.20	SB
28	B	Gábor Karsai	Hungary	29:32.89	SB
29	B	Uģis Jocis	Latvia	29:48.48	SB
	A	Othmane El Goumri	Morocco	DNF	Pace
	A	Tom Förster	Germany	DNF	
	A	Martin Kiprotich	Uganda	DNF	Pace
	A	Ilias Fifa	Spain	DNF	
	B	Mohcin Outalha	Morocco	DNF	Pace
	B	Ahmed Ouhda	Italy	DNF	
	B	Timo Hinterndorfer	Austria	DNF	

Teams
Rank	Team	Time	Note
1st place, gold medalist(s)	France	1:23:30.67	
2nd place, silver medalist(s)	Belgium	1:24:51.35	
3rd place, bronze medalist(s)	Spain	1:24:58.61	
4	Italy	1:25:32.32	
	Germany	DNF	

=== Women's ===
Individual race
Rank	Heat	Athlete	Nationality	Time	Note
1st place, gold medalist(s)	A	Jana Van Lent	Belgium	31:32.28	PB
2nd place, silver medalist(s)	A	Alessia Zarbo	France	31:50.62	PB
3rd place, bronze medalist(s)	A	Chloé Herbiet	Belgium	31:54.06	PB
4	A	Eva Dieterich	Germany	31:56.91	
5	A	Elisa Palmero	Italy	32:05.95	SB
6	A	Federica Del Buono	Italy	32:12.72	SB
7	A	Bahar Yıldırım	Turkey	32:15.78	PB
8	A	Alicia Berzosa	Spain	32:20.49	PB
9	A	Sara Nestola	Italy	32:21.65	PB
10	B	Viktoriia Kaliuzhna	Ukraine	32:30.35	PB
11	B	Nursena Çeto	Turkey	32:34.69	PB
12	A	Hanne Verbruggen	Belgium	32:35.78	PB
13	A	Esther Navarrete	Spain	32:36.85	SB
14	B	Mariia Mazurenko	Ukraine	32:49.19	PB
15	A	Célia Tabet	France	32:50.15	SB
16	A	Philippine De La Bigne	France	32:59.72	SB
17	B	Victoria Warpy	Belgium	33:17.08	PB
18	B	Viktoriia Shkurko	Ukraine	33:17.49	
19	A	Coraline Maâmouri	France	33:18.13	SB
20	B	Karawan Halabi Kablan	Israel	33:18.24	PB
21	A	Agate Caune	Latvia	33:21.16	SB
22	A	Rebecca Lonedo	Italy	33:25.05	SB
23	A	Lili Anna Vindics-Tóth	Hungary	33:34.07	
24	A	Mélody Julien	France	33:42.93	SB
25	B	Dilek Öztürk	Turkey	33:48.34	
26	B	Devora Avramova	Bulgaria	33:52.91	PB
27	A	Yonca Kutluk	Turkey	33:53.22	
28	B	Derya Kunur	Turkey	34:02.93	
29	B	Olga Nyzhnyk	Ukraine	34:04.02	
30	B	Olimpia Breza	Poland	34:09.34	
31	B	Andrea Meier	Switzerland	34:13.29	SB
32	B	Nele Heymann	Germany	34:33.64	
33	B	Elena Eichenberger	Switzerland	34:40.15	SB
34	B	Denisa Balla	Greece	34:40.95	PB
35	B	Anna Arnaudo	Italy	34:49.16	SB
36	B	Romane Wolhauser	Switzerland	34:57.71	PB
37	B	Giulia Fulginiti	Switzerland	35:48.78	SB
	A	Soukaina Atanane	Morocco	DNF	Pace
	B	María José Pérez	Spain	DNS	

Teams
Rank	Team	Time	Note
1st place, gold medalist(s)	Belgium	1:36:02.12	
2nd place, silver medalist(s)	Italy	1:36:40.32	
3rd place, bronze medalist(s)	France	1:37:40.49	
4	Ukraine	1:38:37.03	
5	Turkey	1:38:38.81	
6	Switzerland	1:43:51.15	
