= 2025 European Running Championships =

1st European Athletics Running Championships
- Dates: 12 – 13 April
- Host city: Brussels and Leuven, Belgium
- Level: Senior
- Type: Outdoor
- Participation: 323 athletes from 45 nations

The 1st European Running Championships took place in Brussels and Leuven, Belgium, from April 12 to 13, 2025. The event included marathon, half-marathon, and 10-kilometer races for both men and women. The marathon route began in the heart of Brussels, the Belgian capital, and finished in the historic center of Leuven. Meanwhile, the half-marathon and 10 km races started in Leuven, traversing the city and its surrounding areas.

== Results ==
=== Men ===
Event	Gold		Silver		Bronze	
10 kilometres	Yann Schrub (FRA)	0:27:37	Etienne Daguinos (FRA)	0:27:46	Isaac Kimeli (BEL)	0:27:58
Half marathon	Jimmy Gressier (FRA)	0:59:45	Awet Nftalem Kibrab (NOR)	1:01:08	Valentin Gondouin (FRA)	1:01:54
Marathon	Iliass Aouani (ITA)	2:09:05	Gashau Ayale (ISR)	2:09:08	Maru Teferi (ISR)	2:09:17
Team marathon	Israel; Gashau Ayale; Maru Teferi; Haimro Alame; Bukayawe Malede; Godadaw Belachew; Yitayew Abuhay	6:27:52	Belgium; Dorian Boulvin; Thomas de Bock; Yohan Zaradzki; Simon Mestdagh; Nathan Sevenois; Joris Keppens	6:38:39	Turkey; İlham Tanui Özbilen; Kaan Kigen Özbilen; Hüseyin Can	6:39:17

=== Women ===
Event	Gold		Silver		Bronze	
10 kilometres	Nadia Battocletti (ITA)	0:31:10	Eva Dieterich (GER)	0:31:25	Klara Lukan (SLO)	0:31:26
Half marathon	Chloé Herbiet (BEL)	1:10:43	Juliette Thomas (BEL)	1:10:57	Sara Nestola (ITA)	1:11:26
Marathon	Fatima Azzahraa Ouhaddou Nafie (ESP)	2:27:14	Majida Maayouf (ESP)	2:27:41	Lonah Chemtai Salpeter (ISR)	2:28:01
Team marathon

== Medal table ==
Rank	Nation	Gold	Silver	Bronze	Total
1	France (FRA)	2	1	1	4
2	Italy (ITA)	2	0	1	3
3	Belgium (BEL)	1	1	1	3
4	Spain (ESP)	1	1	0	2
5	Israel (ISR)	0	1	2	3
6	Germany (GER)	0	1	0	1
6	Norway (NOR)	0	1	0	1
8	Slovenia (SLO)	0	0	1	1
Totals (8 entries)		6	6	6	18

== Participation ==
- Albania (1)
- Andorra (2)
- Armenia (2)
- Austria (1)
- Belgium (36)
- Bulgaria (3)
- Croatia (2)
- Cyprus (3)
- Czech Republic (4)
- Denmark (8)
- Estonia (5)
- Finland (3)
- France (20)
- Georgia (1)
- Germany (6)
- Great Britain (13)
- Greece (3)
- Hungary (5)
- Iceland (7)
- Israel (13)
- Ireland (7)
- Italy (21)
- Kosovo (5)
- Latvia (8)
- Lithuania (8)
- Luxembourg (4)
- Malta (4)
- Maldives (2)
- Monaco (2)
- Montenegro (1)
- Netherlands (11)
- North Macedonia (3)
- Norway (7)
- Poland (8)
- Portugal (23)
- Romania (3)
- San Marino (2)
- Serbia (1)
- Slovakia (4)
- Slovenia (3)
- Spain (23)
- Sweden (4)
- Switzerland (6)
- Turkey (17)
- Ukraine (8)

== Men's results ==
=== 10 kilometres ===
Held on 13 April in Leuven.

Individual race
Rank	Name	Nationality	Time	Notes
1st place, gold medalist(s)	Yann Schrub	France	27:37	
2nd place, silver medalist(s)	Etienne Daguinos	France	27:46	
3rd place, bronze medalist(s)	Isaac Kimeli	Belgium	27:58	
4	Fabien Palcau	France	28:05	
5	Jesús Ramos	Spain	28:07	
6	Nils Voigt	Germany	28:08	
7	Sezgin Ataç	Turkey	28:11	
8	Mike Foppen	Netherlands	28:13	
9	Eyob Faniel	Italy	28:14	
10	Juan Antonio Pérez	Spain	28:16	
11	Narve Gilje Nordås	Norway	28:22	
12	Ellis Cross	Great Britain	28:30	
13	Ilias Fifa	Spain	28:32	
14	Rory Leonard	Great Britain	28:33	
15	Davor Aaron Bienenfeld	Germany	28:34	
16	Francesco Guerra	Italy	28:35	
17	Noah Schutte	Netherlands	28:35	
18	Ferdinand Kvan Edman	Norway	28:37	
19	Simon Bedard	France	28:39	
20	Clément Deflandre	Belgium	28:39	
21	Charles Wheeler	Great Britain	28:40	
22	Arnaud Dely	Belgium	28:45	
23	Zemenu Muchie	Israel	28:46	
24	Cormac Dalton	Ireland	28:49	
25	Per Svela	Norway	28:52	
26	Tim Verbaandert	Netherlands	28:55	
27	Adam Nowicki	Poland	28:59	
28	Sander Vercauteren	Belgium	29:03	
29	José Carlos Pinto	Portugal	29:03	
30	Luca Alfieri	Italy	29:05	
31	Ramazan Baştuğ	Turkey	29:07	
32	Alfie Manthorpe	Great Britain	29:09	
34	Ruben Querinjean	Luxembourg	29:09	
35	Baptiste Guyon	France	29:12	
36	Marco Vanderpoorten	Belgium	29:12	
37	Hugo Rocha	Portugal	29:12	
38	Jan Friš	Czech Republic	29:13	
39	Nino Freitag	Switzerland	29:14	
40	Damián Vích	Czech Republic	29:18	
41	Giedrius Valinčius	Lithuania	29:22	
42	Seán Tobin	Ireland	29:22	
43	Peter Ďurec	Slovakia	29:26	
44	João Pereira	Portugal	29:29	
45	Gianluca Assorgia	Netherlands	29:33	
46	Dereje Chekole	Israel	29:34	
47	Keelan Kilrehill	Ireland	29:36	
48	Noah Konteh	Belgium	29:38	
49	Rúben Amaral	Portugal	29:45	
50	Yassin Bouih	Italy	29:48	
51	Abdulhalik Çağıran	Turkey	29:48	
52	Badr Jaafari	Italy	29:53	
53	Simas Bertašius	Lithuania	29:56	
54	Tomislav Novosel	Croatia	30:00	
55	Necho Tayachew	Israel	30:04	
56	Mohammadreza Abootorabi	Sweden	30:09	
57	İsmail Taşyürek	Turkey	30:09	
58	Duarte Santos	Portugal	30:16	
59	Pedro Amaro	Portugal	30:22	
60	Uģis Jocis	Latvia	30:23	
61	Morten Siht	Estonia	30:23	
62	Luke Micallef	Malta	30:34	
63	Hlynur Andrésson	Iceland	30:47	
64	Dmitrijs Serjogins	Latvia	30:59	
65	Nikolaos Stamoulis	Greece	31:31	
66	Carles Gómez	Andorra	31:46	
67	Ðuro Borbelj	Serbia	31:48	
68	Andrii Atamaniuk	Ukraine	31:50	
69	Jānis Razgalis	Latvia	31:54	
70	Albion Ymeri	Kosovo	32:03	
71	Ignas Vanagas	Lithuania	32:09	
72	Lorenzo Bugli	San Marino	32:34	
73	Miljan Kukuličić	Montenegro	32:45	
74	Stefán Kári Smárason	Iceland	33:46	
	Jonas Raess	Switzerland	DNF	
	Abdessamad Oukhelfen	Spain	DNF	
	Dominic Lokinyomo Lobalu	Switzerland	DNF	

Teams
Rank	Team	Time	Note
1st place, gold medalist(s)	France	83:28	
2nd place, silver medalist(s)	Spain	84:55	
3rd place, bronze medalist(s)	Belgium	85:22	
4	Great Britain	85:43	
5	Netherlands	85:43	
6	Norway	85:51	
7	Germany	85:53	
8	Italy	85:54	
9	Turkey	87:06	
10	Portugal	87:44	
11	Ireland	87:47	
12	Israel	88:24	
13	Lithuania	91:27	
14	Latvia	93:16	
	Switzerland	DNF	

=== Half marathon ===
Held on 12 April in Leuven.

Individual race
Rank	Name	Nationality	Time	Notes
1st place, gold medalist(s)	Jimmy Gressier	France	59:45	
2nd place, silver medalist(s)	Awet Nftalem Kibrab	Norway	1:01:08	
3rd place, bronze medalist(s)	Valentin Gondouin	France	1:01:54	
4	Efrem Gidey	Ireland	1:01:55	
5	Yohanes Chiappinelli	Italy	1:02:11	
6	Simon Debognies	Belgium	1:02:27	
7	Jorge Blanco	Spain	1:02:29	
8	Carlos Mayo	Spain	1:02:30	
9	Javier Guerra	Spain	1:02:31	
10	Ebba Tulu Chala	Sweden	1:02:34	
11	Bas van Hooren	Netherlands	1:02:46	
12	Jorge González	Spain	1:02:52	
13	Nassim Hassaous	Spain	1:02:52	
14	Ahmed Ouhda	Italy	1:02:58	
15	Bastien Augusto	France	1:02:58	
16	Raphaël Montoya	France	1:03:16	
17	Xavier Chevrier	Italy	1:03:33	
18	Timo Hinterndorfer	Austria	1:03:36	
19	Pasquale Selvarolo	Italy	1:04:02	
20	Pablo Sánchez	Spain	1:04:11	
21	Amaury Paquet	Belgium	1:04:34	
22	Mykola Nyzhnyk	Ukraine	1:04:42	
23	André Pereira	Portugal	1:04:46	
24	Luís Oliveira	Portugal	1:04:47	
25	Nicolas Schyns	Belgium	1:04:47	
26	Vincent Bierinckx	Belgium	1:04:48	
27	Mikael Johnsen	Denmark	1:04:53	
28	Miguel Marques	Portugal	1:04:57	
29	Arnaud Collard	Belgium	1:05:07	
30	Ahmet Alkanoğlu	Turkey	1:05:07	
31	Jens Sloth	Denmark	1:05:08	
32	Gáspár Csere	Hungary	1:06:29	
33	Edgars Šumskis	Latvia	1:06:45	
34	Dawid Malina	Poland	1:06:56	
35	Alberto Mondazzi	Italy	1:07:38	
36	Murat Emektar	Turkey	1:07:43	
37	Dillon Cassar	Malta	1:07:45	
38	Ádám Lomb	Hungary	1:07:51	
39	Ivan Siuris	North Macedonia	1:07:55	
40	Ersin Tekal	Turkey	1:08:09	
41	Rafael Lopes	Portugal	1:08:13	
42	Giorgos Tofi	Cyprus	1:08:18	
43	Lukas Tarasevičius	Lithuania	1:08:42	
44	Ivan Dračar	Croatia	1:08:50	
45	Panagiotis Karaiskos	Greece	1:08:55	
46	Nicolaï Saké	Belgium	1:09:43	
47	Jakob Medved	Slovenia	1:10:56	
48	Martin Zajíc	Czech Republic	1:16:17	
49	Ilir Këllezi	Albania	1:18:53	
50	Michele Agostini	San Marino	1:19:48	
51	Tirron Mamusha	Kosovo	1:25:03	
	Arnar Pétursson	Iceland	DNF	

Teams
Rank	Team	Time	Note
1st place, gold medalist(s)	France	3:04:37	
2nd place, silver medalist(s)	Spain	3:07:30	
3rd place, bronze medalist(s)	Italy	3:08:42	
4	Belgium	3:11:48	
5	Portugal	3:14:30	
5	Turkey	3:20:59	

=== Marathon ===
Held on 13 April between Brussels and Leuven.

Individual race
Rank	Name	Nationality	Time	Notes
1st place, gold medalist(s)	Iliass Aouani	Italy	2:09:05	
2nd place, silver medalist(s)	Gashau Ayale	Israel	2:09:08	
3rd place, bronze medalist(s)	Maru Teferi	Israel	2:09:17	
4	Haimro Alame	Israel	2:09:27	
5	George James	Great Britain	2:10:10	
6	Ilham Tanui Özbilen	Turkey	2:10:26	
7	Ibrahim Chakir	Spain	2:10:31	
8	Rui Pinto	Portugal	2:11:28	
9	Dorian Boulvin	Belgium	2:11:43	
10	Thomas De Bock	Belgium	2:12:03	
11	Kaan Kigen Özbilen	Turkey	2:13:50	
12	Tiidrek Nurme	Estonia	2:14:02	
13	Dario Ivanovski	North Macedonia	2:14:22	
14	Yohan Zaradzki	Belgium	2:14:53	
15	Hüseyin Can	Turkey	2:15:01	
16	Archie Casteel	Sweden	2:15:27	
17	Bukayawe Malede	Israel	2:16:14	
18	Leonid Latsepov	Estonia	2:16:47	
19	Simon Mestdagh	Belgium	2:17:24	
20	João Almeida	Portugal	2:17:54	
21	José Sousa	Portugal	2:18:20	
22	Godadaw Belachew	Israel	2:18:35	
23	Nathan Sevenois	Belgium	2:18:46	
24	Daviti Kharazishvili	Georgia	2:20:44	
25	Yitayew Abuhay	Israel	2:20:50	
26	Matúš Hujsa	Slovakia	2:21:22	
27	Remigijus Kančys	Lithuania	2:21:58	
28	Simon Spiteri	Malta	2:23:47	
29	Karel Hussar	Estonia	2:24:17	
30	Fábio Oliveira	Portugal	2:25:50	
31	Renārs Roze	Latvia	2:26:44	
32	Joris Keppens	Belgium	2:27:05	
33	Nicolas D'Angelo	Monaco	2:27:11	NR
34	Miroslav Spasov	Bulgaria	2:33:42	
35	Kristján Svanur Eymundsson	Iceland	2:38:51	
36	Michaël Gras	France	2:38:51	
37	Roman Aleksanyan	Armenia	2:53:19	
38	Oleksandr Miroshnychenko	Ukraine	2:53:32	
39	Naim Foniqi	Kosovo	3:26:34	
	Emmanuel Roudolff Levisse	France	DNF	
	Benjamin Choquert	France	DNF	
	Thijs Nijhuis	Denmark	DNF	

Teams
Rank	Team	Time	Note
1st place, gold medalist(s)	Israel	6:27:52	
2nd place, silver medalist(s)	Belgium	6:38:39	
3rd place, bronze medalist(s)	Turkey	6:39:17	
4	Portugal	6:47:42	
5	Estonia	6:55:06	
	France	DNF	

== Women's results ==
=== 10 kilometres ===
Held on 13 April in Leuven.

Individual race
Rank	Name	Nationality	Time	Notes
1st place, gold medalist(s)	Nadia Battocletti	Italy	31:10	
2nd place, silver medalist(s)	Eva Dieterich	Germany	31:25	
3rd place, bronze medalist(s)	Klara Lukan	Slovenia	31:26	
4	Mariana Machado	Portugal	31:30	
5	Jana Van Lent	Belgium	31:32	
6	Sarah Lahti	Sweden	31:35	
7	Sofiia Yaremchuk	Italy	31:39	
8	Mekdes Woldu	France	31:43	
9	Valentina Gemetto	Italy	31:44	
10	Elena Burkard	Germany	31:52	
11	Verity Ockenden	Great Britain	32:11	
12	Leonie Periault	France	32:11	
13	Lisa Rooms	Belgium	32:16	
14	Beth Potter	Great Britain	32:16	
15	Carla Gallardo	Spain	32:18	
16	Ilona Mononen	Finland	32:20	
17	Lisa Merkel	Germany	32:21	
18	Niamh Allen	Ireland	32:25	
19	Aude Clavier	France	32:34	
20	Laura Luengo	Spain	32:35	
21	Agate Caune	Latvia	32:38	
22	Elisa Palmero	Italy	32:39	
23	Julie Voet	Belgium	32:44	
24	Célia Tabet	France	32:44	
25	Carolina Robles	Spain	32:44	
26	Laura Taborda	Portugal	32:44	
27	Kaoutar Boulaid	Spain	32:45	
28	Federica Del Buono	Italy	32:46	
29	Gaia Colli	Italy	32:47	
30	Emily Haggard-Kearney	Ireland	32:51	
31	Phoebe Anderson	Great Britain	32:52	
32	Amelia Quirk	Great Britain	32:55	
33	Elżbieta Glinka	Poland	32:57	
34	Lili Anna Vindics-Tóth	Hungary	33:01	
35	Alicia Berzosa	Spain	33:02	
36	Sarah Astin	Great Britain	33:02	
37	Isabel Barreiro	Spain	33:04	
38	Roxane Cleppe	Belgium	33:07	
39	Yasemin Can	Turkey	33:07	
40	Alicja Konieczek	Poland	33:16	
41	Stella Rutto	Romania	33:19	
42	Alberte Kjær Pedersen	Denmark	33:20	
43	Eline Dalemans	Belgium	33:23	
44	Juliane Hvid	Denmark	33:24	
45	Ineke van Koldam	Netherlands	33:26	
46	Veerle Bakker	Netherlands	33:27	
47	Jennifer Nesbitt	Great Britain	33:30	
48	Oria Liaci	Switzerland	33:33	
49	Kristine Lande Dommersnes	Norway	33:37	
50	Viktoriia Shkurko	Ukraine	33:37	
51	Jennifer Gulikers	Netherlands	33:38	
52	Viktória Wagner-Gyürkés	Hungary	33:41	
53	Derya Kunur	Turkey	33:41	
54	Nóra Szabó	Hungary	33:42	
55	Nina Chydenius	Finland	33:45	
56	Giulia Fulginiti	Switzerland	33:48	
57	Monika Olejarz	Poland	33:49	
58	Karawan Halabi Kablan	Israel	33:52	
59	Izabela Paszkiewicz	Poland	33:57	
60	Meryem Akda	Turkey	33:59	
61	Ana Mafalda Ferreira	Portugal	34:07	
62	Anna Emilie Møller	Denmark	34:12	
63	Pelinsu Şahin	Turkey	34:15	
64	Ana Marinho	Portugal	34:16	
65	Emmy van den Berg	Netherlands	34:24	
66	Andrea Kolbeinsdóttir	Iceland	34:24	
67	Mădălina-Elena Sîrbu	Romania	34:26	
68	Devora Avramova	Bulgaria	34:28	
69	Julia Koralewska	Poland	34:30	
70	Sigrid Jervell Våg	Norway	34:34	
71	Coraline Maâmouri	France	34:36	
72	Elena Eichenberger	Switzerland	34:41	
73	Febe Triest	Belgium	35:10	
74	Adrijana Pop Arsova	North Macedonia	35:15	
75	Sandra Lieners	Luxembourg	35:17	
76	Auksė Linkutė	Lithuania	35:29	
77	Ariadna Fenes	Andorra	35:44	
78	Lucia Pelikánová	Slovakia	35:45	
79	Mihaela Botnari	Moldova	36:16	
80	Mónica Silva	Portugal	36:28	
81	Liliana Maria Dragomir	Romania	37:13	
82	Maria Papanastasiou	Cyprus	37:36	
83	Lisa Marie Bezzina	Malta	38:06	
84	Agathe Julien	Monaco	44:14	
85	Valentina Kelmendi-Musa	Kosovo	44:39	
	Anastasia Marinakou	Greece	DNF	

Teams
Rank	Team	Time	Note
1st place, gold medalist(s)	Italy	94:33	
2nd place, silver medalist(s)	Germany	95:38	
3rd place, bronze medalist(s)	France	96:28	
4	Belgium	96:32	
5	Great Britain	97:19	
6	Spain	97:37	
7	Portugal	98:21	
8	Poland	100:02	
9	Hungary	100:24	
10	Netherlands	100:31	
11	Turkey	100:47	
12	Denmark	100:56	
13	Switzerland	102:02	
14	Romania	104:58	

=== Half marathon ===
Held on 12 April in Leuven.

Individual race
Rank	Name	Nationality	Time	Notes
1st place, gold medalist(s)	Chloé Herbiet	Belgium	1:10:43	
2nd place, silver medalist(s)	Juliette Thomas	Belgium	1:10:57	
3rd place, bronze medalist(s)	Sara Nestola	Italy	1:11:26	
4	Meritxell Soler	Spain	1:11:39	
5	Mariia Mazurenko	Ukraine	1:11:51	
6	Susana Santos	Portugal	1:12:03	
7	Rebecca Lonedo	Italy	1:12:43	
8	Olga Nyzhnyk	Ukraine	1:12:45	
9	Bahar Yıldırım	Turkey	1:12:51	
10	María José Pérez	Spain	1:12:52	
11	Liza Šajn	Slovenia	1:12:53	
12	Mélanie Allier	France	1:13:05	
13	Nursena Çeto	Turkey	1:13:09	
14	Victoria Warpy	Belgium	1:13:19	
15	Susanna Saapunki	Finland	1:13:20	
16	Hannah Irwin	Great Britain	1:13:54	
17	Nicole Svetlana Reina	Italy	1:14:11	
18	Carla Martinho	Portugal	1:14:27	
19	Ikram Rharsalla	Spain	1:14:35	
20	Sümeyye Erol	Turkey	1:14:38	
21	Jacelyn Gruppen	Netherlands	1:14:51	
22	Rafaela Almeida	Portugal	1:14:58	
23	Amélie Bihain	Belgium	1:15:05	
24	Marinela Nineva	Bulgaria	1:15:07	
25	Sara Schou Kristensen	Denmark	1:15:22	
26	Ann-Marie McGlynn	Ireland	1:15:53	
27	Maria Sagnes Wågan	Norway	1:15:54	
28	Liis-Grete Arro	Estonia	1:16:33	
29	Vaida Žūsinaitė-Nekriošienė	Lithuania	1:16:38	
30	Lina Kiriliuk	Lithuania	1:17:11	
31	Carolien Millenaar	Denmark	1:17:13	
32	Jolien Denis	Belgium	1:17:46	
33	Malejeva Mathijs	Belgium	1:19:01	
34	Ecaterina Cernat	Moldova	1:19:09	
35	Sigþóra Brynja Kristjánsdóttir	Iceland	1:20:14	
36	Daryna Omarova	Ukraine	1:21:57	
37	Anny Wolter	Luxembourg	1:23:08	
38	Eleni Ioannou	Cyprus	1:23:15	
39	Agata Strausa	Latvia	1:26:39	
40	Qendresa Ramadani	Kosovo	1:39:38	
	Esther Pfeiffer	Germany	DNF	
	Diane van Es	Netherlands	DNF	

Teams
Rank	Team	Time	Note
1st place, gold medalist(s)	Belgium	3:34:59	
2nd place, silver medalist(s)	Italy	3:38:20	
3rd place, bronze medalist(s)	Spain	3:39:06	
4	Turkey	3:40:38	
5	Portugal	3:41:28	
6	Ukraine	3:46:33	

=== Marathon ===
Held on 13 April between Brussels and Leuven.

Individual race
Rank	Name	Nationality	Time	Notes
1st place, gold medalist(s)	Fatima Ouhaddou	Spain	2:27:14	
2nd place, silver medalist(s)	Majida Maayouf	Spain	2:27:41	
3rd place, bronze medalist(s)	Lonah Chemtai Salpeter	Israel	2:28:01	
4	Maor Tiyouri	Israel	2:28:01	
5	Giovanna Epis	Italy	2:29:14	
6	Solange Jesus	Portugal	2:29:39	
7	Ester Navarrete	Spain	2:29:49	
8	Aleksandra Brzezińska	Poland	2:31:54	
9	Tereza Hrochová	Czech Republic	2:32:15	
10	Mélody Julien	France	2:33:41	
11	Clémence Calvin	France	2:34:20	
12	Hanne Verbruggen	Belgium	2:35:40	
13	Georgina Schwiening	Great Britain	2:40:17	
14	Nina Usubyan	Armenia	2:40:40	
15	Kim Geypen	Belgium	2:42:00	
16	Amelie Saussez	Belgium	2:43:57	
17	Helen Volfson	Israel	2:44:16	
18	Anna Kļučņika	Latvia	2:48:17	
19	Valentine Mathy	Belgium	2:49:06	
20	Hanna Vandenbussche	Belgium	2:51:19	
21	Elín Edda Sigurðardóttir	Iceland	2:51:27	
22	Ivanna Melnyk	Ukraine	2:53:32	
23	Margaux Bruls	Luxembourg	2:59:19	
24	Karen Van Proeyen	Belgium	3:50:44	
	Veronika Páleníková	Slovakia	DNF	

Teams
Rank	Team	Time	Note
1st place, gold medalist(s)	Spain	7:24:44	
2nd place, silver medalist(s)	Israel	7:40:18	
3rd place, bronze medalist(s)	Belgium	8:01:37	
