= 2023 European 10,000m Cup =

- Organisers: EAA
- Edition: 26th
- Date: 3 June
- Host city: Pacé, Ille-et-Vilaine, France
- Venue: Complexe sportif Jean-Paul Chassebœuf
- Events: 2
- Participation: 109 athletes from 25 nations

The 26th edition of the European 10,000m Cup took place on 3 June 2023, in Pacé, France.

== Medallists ==
Event	Gold	Silver	Bronze
Individual
Men	(Italy) Yemaneberhan Crippa; 28:08.83 SB	(Israel) Tadesse Getahon; 28:09.48	(Spain) Ilias Fifa; 28:12.62
Women	(Germany) Alina Reh; 32:15.47 SB	(Ukraine) Valeriya Zinenko; 32:29.81	(Germany) Domenika Mayer; 32:35.95
Team
Men	Israel; 1:25:01.92	Italy; 1:25:10.56	France; 1:25:26.15
Women	Germany; 1:37:40.69	Spain; 1:38:50.68	Ukraine; 1:39:03.17

== Results ==
=== Men's ===
Individual race
Rank	Heat	Athlete	Nationality	Time	Note
1st place, gold medalist(s)	A	Yemaneberhan Crippa	Italy	28:08.83	SB
2nd place, silver medalist(s)	A	Tadesse Getahon	Israel	28:09.48	
3rd place, bronze medalist(s)	A	Ilias Fifa	Spain	28:12.62	
4	A	Gashau Ayale	Israel	28:15.32	
5	A	Eyob Faniel	Italy	28:19.01	PB
6	A	Valentin Gondouin	France	28:20.78	
7	A	Thomas George	Great Britain	28:23.06	
8	A	Mehdi Frère	France	28:25.44	SB
9	A	Jesús Ramos	Spain	28:29.44	SB
10	A	Dereje Chekole	Israel	28:37.12	
11	A	Yitayew Abuhay	Israel	28:37.70	
12	A	Jack Gray	Great Britain	28:38.25	
13	A	Félix Bour	France	28:39.93	
14	A	Sezgin Ataç	Turkey	28:41.17	
15	A	Fabien Palcau	France	28:41.48	SB
16	A	Etienne Daguinos	France	28:42.49	SB
17	A	Iliass Aouani	Italy	28:42.72	
18	A	Fearghal Curtin	Ireland	28:44.31	
19	A	Godadaw Belachew	Israel	28:46.88	
20	A	Filmon Teklebrhan	Germany	28:47.51	
21	A	Matthew Leach	Great Britain	28:48.01	
22	A	Andreas Vojta	Austria	28:55.99	SB
23	A	Juan Pérez	Spain	28:57.11	SB
24	A	Jan Lukas Becker	Germany	28:57.47	
25	A	Morgan Le Guen	Switzerland	28:58.08	PB
26	A	Yago Rojo	Spain	29:01.39	SB
27	B	Mohammadreza Abootorabi	Sweden	29:04.95	
28	A	Roberto Aláiz	Spain	29:07.64	SB
29	A	Alberto Mondazzi	Italy	29:08.16	
30	A	Pasquale Selvarolo	Italy	29:08.39	
31	B	Dmytro Siruk	Ukraine	29:08.61	SB
32	B	Peter Durec	Slovakia	29:14.33	PB
33	A	Ramazan Özdemir	Turkey	29:15.67	
34	A	Bukayaw Malede	Israel	29:16.54	
35	B	Ihor Porozov	Ukraine	29:44.16	
36	B	Vasyl Koval	Ukraine	29:49.61	
37	B	Luís Oliveira	Portugal	29:52.62	
38	B	Dominik Stadlmann	Austria	29:54.23	PB
39	B	Evan Byrne	Ireland	29:54.37	SB
40	B	Marios Anagnostou	Greece	30:08.13	
41	B	Jonathan Dahlke	Germany	30:10.59	
42	B	Uģis Jocis	Latvia	30:17.30	SB
43	B	Conor Bradley	Ireland	30:26.14	SB
44	B	Roman Romanenko	Ukraine	30:35.11	
45	B	Leonid Latsepov	Estonia	30:56.66	SB
46	B	Malte Propp	Germany	31:13.17	
	A	Nekagenet Crippa	Italy	DNF	
	B	Bohdan-Ivan Horodyskyy	Ukraine	DNF	
	B	Primož Kobe	Slovenia	DNF	
	B	Olle Ahlberg	Sweden	DNF	
	B	Ömer Amaçtan	Turkey	DNF	
	B	Timo Hinterndorfer	Austria	DNF	

Teams
Rank	Team	Time	Note
1st place, gold medalist(s)	Israel	1:25:01.92	
2nd place, silver medalist(s)	Italy	1:25:10.56	
3rd place, bronze medalist(s)	France	1:25:26.15	
4	Spain	1:25:39.17	
5	Great Britain	1:25:49.32	
6	Germany	1:27:55.57	
7	Ukraine	1:28:42.38	
8	Ireland	1:29:04.82	
	Austria	–	
	Turkey	–	

=== Women's ===
Individual race
Rank	Heat	Athlete	Nationality	Time	Note
1st place, gold medalist(s)	A	Alina Reh	Germany	32:15.47	SB
2nd place, silver medalist(s)	A	Valeriya Zinenko	Ukraine	32:29.81	
3rd place, bronze medalist(s)	A	Domenika Mayer	Germany	32:35.95	
4	A	Mekdes Woldu	France	32:37.52	SB
5	A	Chloe Herbiet	Belgium	32:42.54	
6	A	Yayla Günen	Turkey	32:43.29	PB
7	A	Esther Navarrete	Spain	32:45.04	
8	A	Eva Dieterich	Germany	32:49.27	
9	A	Cristina Ruiz	Spain	32:49.60	
10	A	Moira Stewartová	Czech Republic	32:54.86	SB
11	A	Fatma Demir	Turkey	32:56.80	
12	A	Elisa Palmero	Italy	33:02.48	PB
13	A	Abbie Donnelly	Great Britain	33:04.40	
14	A	Sara Nestola	Italy	33:05.54	PB
15	A	Yevheniya Prokofyeva	Ukraine	33:14.19	SB
16	A	Laura Priego	Spain	33:16.04	
17	A	Viktoriya Kalyuzhna	Ukraine	33:19.17	SB
18	A	Melanie Allier	France	33:19.80	
19	B	Ide Nic Dhomhnaill	Ireland	33:24.10	PB
20	B	Shona Heaslip	Ireland	33:26.96	SB
21	B	Rebecca Lonedo	Italy	33:28.75	SB
22	B	Hanne Mjøen Maridal	Norway	33:46.01	SB
23	A	Aoibhe Richardson	Ireland	33:49.01	SB
24	B	Johanna Peiponen	Finland	33:54.22	SB
25	B	Lilla Böhm	Hungary	33:58.60	PB
26	A	Maitane Melero	Spain	34:26.48	
27	A	Sara Catarina Ribeiro	Portugal	34:27.49	
28	A	Bahar Atalay	Turkey	34:30.32	
29	A	Rebecca Murray	Great Britain	34:33.94	
30	B	Melody Julien	France	34:40.55	
31	B	Mathilde Theisen	Norway	34:50.24	SB
32	B	Laura Luengo	Spain	34:59.60	SB
33	B	Devora Avramova	Bulgaria	34:59.74	PB
34	B	Kristin Waaktaar Opland	Norway	35:00.17	PB
35	B	Irini Tsoupaki	Greece	35:26.24	
36	B	Lina Kiriliuk	Lithuania	35:30.22	
37	B	Mariia Mazurenko	Ukraine	35:51.30	
38	B	Neja Kršinar	Slovenia	35:57.14	
39	B	Vaida Žūsinaitė	Lithuania	36:03.17	SB
40	B	Selina Ummel	Switzerland	36:19.63	SB
41	A	Liza Šajn	Slovenia	37:01.41	
	A	Anna Arnaudo	Italy	DNF	
	A	Hannah Irwin	Great Britain	DNF	
	A	Giovanna Epis	Italy	DNF	
	B	Aude Korotchansky	France	DNF	
	B	Giovanna Selva	Italy	DNF	
	B	Nina Chydenius	Finland	DNF	

Teams
Rank	Team	Time	Note
1st place, gold medalist(s)	Germany	1:37:40.69	
2nd place, silver medalist(s)	Spain	1:38:50.68	
3rd place, bronze medalist(s)	Ukraine	1:39:03.17	
4	Italy	1:39:36.77	
5	Turkey	1:40:10.41	
6	France	1:40:37.87	
7	Ireland	1:40:40.07	
8	Norway	1:43:36.42	
	Great Britain	–	
