= Juliette Thomas (runner) =

Belgian athlete (born 2000)

Personal information
- Nationality: Belgian
- Born: 30 October 2000 (age 25)

Sport
- Sport: Athletics
- Event: Long distance running
Medal record
Representing Belgium
European Running Championships
Silver medal – second place	2025 Leuven	Half marathon
European Cross Country Championships
Bronze medal – third place	2023 Brussels	Team

Juliette Thomas (born 30 October 2000) is a Belgian long-distance runner. She has won senior national titles over the marathon, and the half marathon distances and she was a silver medalist at the 2025 European Running Championships in the half marathon.

== Biography ==
She is from Gaume and is a French-speaker. She has competed for Dampicourt AC in the Wallonia region of Belgium.

She was a bronze medalist in the team event alongside Lisa Rooms and Chloé Herbiet at the 2023 European Cross Country Championships in Brussels, the first time the Belgian women's team had won a medal at the event.

In January 2024, she ran the Seville half marathon in 1:10.16 to move to second on the Belgian all-time list for the distance. It was also the seventh fastest time in Belgian history in the event, with Marleen Renders holding the six fastest recorded times. She won the Belgian Half Marathon Championships in May 2024 running 1:09:48 to be the highest Belgian finisher in Gentbrugge. In June, she competed in the half marathon at the 2024 European Athletics Championships in Rome, Italy, running a time of 1:11:35. She was named Belgian champion after placing second at the Eindhoven Marathon in October 2024 in 2:27:23.

She was a silver medalist behind Chloe Herbiet at the 2025 European Running Championships in the half marathon in Leuven, Belgium, in April 2025. In May 2025, in Vienna, Austria, she became the Belgian record holder in the 5 km road race, running 15:21 to beat the previous record held by Jana Van Lent and set just five months prior.
