= Athletics at the 2025 Summer World University Games – Women's 10,000 metres =

Women's 10,000 metres at the 2025 Summer World University Games
- Venue: Lohrheidestadion
- Location: Bochum, Germany
- Dates: 21 July
- Competitors: 27 from 18 nations
- Winning time: 31:25.84 GR

Medalists
gold medal	Klara Lukan	Slovenia
silver medal	Sarah Wanjiru	Kenya
bronze medal	Alicia Berzosa	Spain

The women's 10,000 metres event at the 2025 Summer World University Games was held in Bochum, Germany, at Lohrheidestadion on 21 July.

== Records ==
Prior to the competition, the records were as follows:

Record	Athlete (nation)	Time (s)	Location	Date
Games record	Viorica Ghican (ROU)	31:46.43	Duisburg, Germany	29 August 1989

== Results ==
Place	Athlete	Nation	Time	Notes
1st place, gold medalist(s)	Klara Lukan	Slovenia	31:25.84	GR
2nd place, silver medalist(s)	Sarah Wanjiru	Kenya	31:41.80	PB
3rd place, bronze medalist(s)	Alicia Berzosa	Spain	32:00.73	PB
4	Mei Hosomi	Japan	32:01.91	PB
5	Bronte Oates	Australia	32:11.77	PB
6	Mariana Machado	Portugal	32:27.06	
7	Julia Koralewska	Poland	32:28.02	PB
8	Rasara Wijesuriya	Sri Lanka	32:52.20	NR
9	Nursena Çeto	Turkey	32:52.25	
10	Nicola Jansen	South Africa	32:56.14	SB
11	Liza Šajn	Slovenia	32:56.40	SB
12	Ma Xiuzhen	China	33:04.85	
13	Karabo Mailula	South Africa	33:06.34	PB
14	Holly Weedall	Great Britain	33:07.23	PB
15	Ayaka Maeda	Japan	33:13.83	
16	Yonca Kutluk	Turkey	33:15.49	
17	Carly Wilkes	United States	33:40.81	
18	Wakana Hashimoto	Japan	33:49.84	
19	Kristine Meinert Rød	Norway	34:29.54	
20	Dilek Öztürk	Turkey	34:49.90	
21	Saskia Lloyd	Australia	35:06.30	
22	Thi Thu Ha Bui	Vietnam	35:39.13	
23	Janeth Aracely Andrade	Ecuador	40:17.70	SB
24	Natasha Hassan	Pakistan	43:55.91	PB
—	Judy Jepkoech Kosgei	Kenya	DNF	
—	Kira Weis	Germany	DNF	
—	Li Yingcui	China	DQ	
