= 2024 European Athletics Championships – Women's 10,000 metres =

Event at international athletics competition

Women's 10,000 metres at the 2024 European Athletics Championships
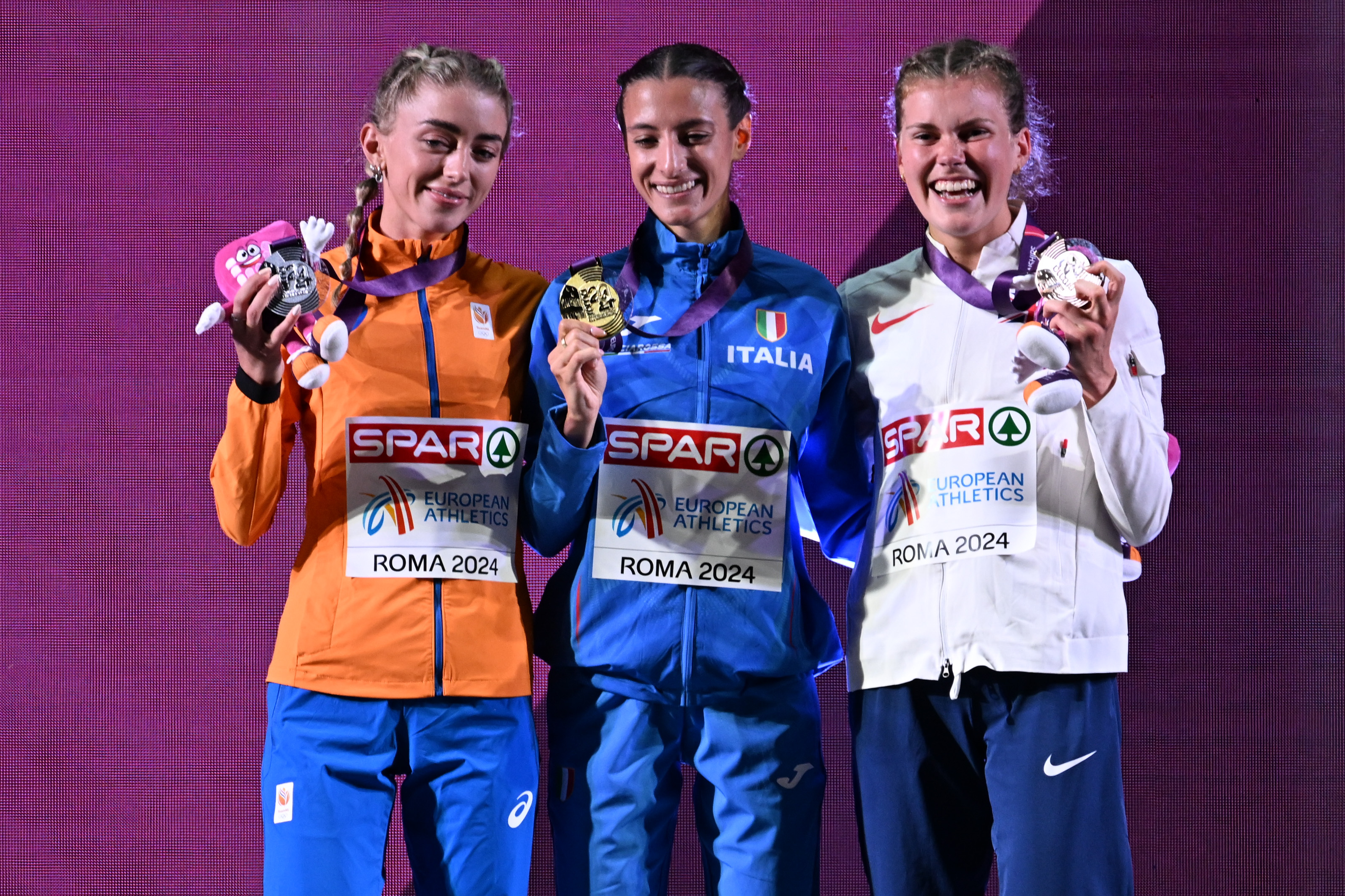
- The podium
- Venue: Stadio Olimpico
- Location: Rome
- Dates: 11 June (final)
- Competitors: 33 from 15 nations
- Winning time: 30:51.32

Medalists
gold medal	Nadia Battocletti	Italy
silver medal	Diane van Es	Netherlands
bronze medal	Megan Keith	Great Britain

The women's 10,000 metres at the 2024 European Athletics Championships took place at the Stadio Olimpico on 11 June.

== Records ==
Standing records prior to the 2024 European Athletics Championships
World record	Beatrice Chebet (KEN)	28:54.14	Eugene, United States	25 May 2024
European record	Sifan Hassan (NED)	29:06.82	Hengelo, Netherlands	6 June 2021
Championship record	Paula Radcliffe (GBR)	30:01.09	Munich, Germany	6 August 2002
World Leading	Beatrice Chebet (KEN)	28:54.14	Eugene, United States	25 May 2024
Europe Leading	Megan Keith (GBR)	30:36.84	San Juan Capistrano, United States	16 March 2024

== Schedule ==
Date	Time	Round
11 June 2024	21:30	Final A

All times are local times (UTC+2)

== Results ==
Jessica Warner-Judd collapsed during the race with a seizure from previously undiagnosed epilepsy.

Rank	Name	Nationality	Time	Note
1st place, gold medalist(s)	Nadia Battocletti	Italy	30:51.32	NR
2nd place, silver medalist(s)	Diane van Es	Netherlands	30:57.24	PB
3rd place, bronze medalist(s)	Megan Keith	Great Britain	31:04.77	
4	Federica del Buono	Italy	31:25.41	PB
5	Klara Lukan	Slovenia	31:34.90	
6	Elisa Palmero	Italy	31:38.45	PB
7	Jasmijn Lau	Netherlands	32:15.91	PB
8	Nina Chydenius	Finland	32:16.85	PB
9	Lisa Merkel	Germany	32:17.24	
10	Chloé Herbiet	Belgium	32:17.88	
11	Jana Van Lent	Belgium	32:35.23	
12	Alicia Berzosa	Spain	32:37.60	PB
13	Silke Jonkman	Netherlands	32:38.73	SB
14	Laura Priego	Spain	32:40.25	PB
15	Lilla Böhm	Hungary	32:41.41	PB
16	Anastasia Marinakou	Greece	32:42.34	
17	Hanne Mjøen Maridal	Norway	32:50.62	PB
18	Veerle Bakker	Netherlands	33:07.14	
19	Eva Dieterich	Germany	33:17.78	
20	Anika Thompson	Ireland	33:19.42	
21	Valentina Gemetto	Italy	33:23.43	
22	Bojana Bjeljac	Croatia	33:48.63	SB
23	Deborah Schöneborn	Germany	33:48.90	SB
24	Dafni-Eftychia-Tereza Lavasa	Greece	33:57.79	
25	Yonca Kutluk	Turkey	34:01.21	
26	Laura Mooney	Ireland	34:03.94	
27	Liza Šajn	Slovenia	34:13.15	
28	Yasna Petrova	Bulgaria	34:56.89	
	Bahar Atalay	Turkey	DNF	
	Jessica Warner-Judd	Great Britain	DNF	
	Jennifer Gulikers	Netherlands	DNF	
	Eilish McColgan	Great Britain	DNF	
	Anna Arnaudo	Italy	DNF	
