= Bahar Yıldırım =

Turkish long-distance runner (born 1998)

Personal information
- Full name: Bahar Atalay Yıldırım
- Nationality: Turkish
- Born: Bahar Atalay; 1 October 1998 (age 27) Kars, Turkey

Sport
- Sport: Running
- Event(s): 3000 m, 5000 m, 10000 m, cross country and half-marathon
Medal record
Representing Turkey
Women's athletics
World Mountain Running Championships
Silver medal – second place	2017 Premana	J Mountain
Balkan Championships
Silver medal – second place	2024 İzmir	3000 m
Balkan Indoor Championships
Silver medal – second place	2025 Belgrade	3000 m

Bahar Atalay Yıldırım (born Bahar Atalay; 1 October 1998) is a Turkish long-distance running athlete, who competes over the distances 3000 m, 5000 m, 10000 m as well as in cross country and half-marathon.

== Personal life ==
Bahar Atalay was born in Kars, Turkey on 1 October 1998. After marriage, she took the surname Yıldırım.

== Sport career ==
=== 2017 ===
She won the silver medal in the juniors category running the 6.5 km in 33:02 at the 2017 World Mountain Running Championships in Premana, Italy.

=== 2019 ===
She competed in the U23 category at the 2019 European Cross Country Championships in Lisbon, Portugal, and placed 19th with 22:12 in 8 km.

=== 2023 ===
At the 2023 European Cross Country Championships in Brussels, Belgium, her time of 36:56 for seniors in 8 km placed herin the 31st place. She ranked 22nd with 34:30.32 at the 2023 European 10,000m Cup in Pacé, Ille-et-Vilaine, France.

=== 2024 ===
She won the silver medal in the 3000 m event with 9:21.37 at the 2024 Balkan Athletics Championships in İzmir, Turkey. The race at the 2024 European Athletics Championships – Women's 10,000 metres in Rome, Italy, she did not finish. Yıldırım took part in the 7.5 km Senior Women event at the 2024 European Cross Country Championships in Antalya, Turkey, and placed 15th with 26:36.53.

=== 2025 ===
She competed as part of the Turkish women's team with Nursema Çeto and Sümeyye Erol in the half-marathon event at the 2025 European Running Championships in Leuven, Brussels, Belgium. She had a time of 1:12.51 and her team placed fourth. In May 2025, she became Turkish champion, and was selected to the national team. She took part at the 2025 European 10,000m Cup in Pacé, Ille-et-Vilaine, France, and placed seventh running her personal best time of 32:15.78. She won the silver medal in the 3000 m event with 9:00.84 at the 2025 Balkan Athletics Indoor Championships in Belgrade, Serbia. She competed in the 5000 m event at the 2025 European Athletics Team Championships Second Division in Maribor, Slovenia, and placed fifth with her time of 15:56.04. She contributed to her team's record with twelve points.
