= Félix Bour =

French long-distance runner (born 1994)

Personal information
- Born: 25 March 1994 (age 32) Bar-le-Duc, France

Sport
- Sport: Athletics
- Events: Long distance running, Cross country running
Medal record
Men's athletics
Representing France
European 10,000m Cup
Bronze medal – third place	2025 Pacé	10,000 m
European Cross Country Championships
Gold medal – first place	2021 Dublin	Senior team

Félix Bour (born 25 March 1994) is a French long-distance runner. He competed at the 2024 Olympic Games.

== Biography ==
In September 2021, he was runner-up at the French senior cross country championships. He won the gold medal with the France team at the 2021 European Cross Country Championships in Dublin, Ireland, where he also placed eighth overall in the individual race.

In March 2023, he became French champion in the 10 km event ahead of Valentin Gondouin, his time of 28:02 moved him the fifth on the French all-time list.

In May 2024, he became French champion over 10,000 metres. In 2024, he ran a marathon personal best of 2:06::46 in Valencia, Spain. He ran in the marathon at the 2024 Olympic Games in Paris, placing fiftieth overall.

In January 2025, he finished in second place at the Seville half marathon, achieving a personal best of 1:00.00. In March 2025, he won his first French elite cross-country championship title. He won the bronze medal at the 2025 European 10,000m Cup in May 2025 in Pacé, France.

In August 2026, he competed at the 2026 European Athletics Championships in Birmingham, England, in the men's marathon.
