= Alfie Manthorpe =

British long-distance runner (born 1999)

Personal information
- Born: 26 September 1999 (age 27) Chester, United Kingdom

Sport
- Sport: Athletics
- Events: Middle-distance running, Long-distance running
- Club: Hallamshire Harriers Sheffield

Achievements and titles
- Personal bests: 1500m: 3:46.68 (Manchester, 2024); Mile: 4:09.75 (Loughborough, 2024); 3000m: 7:53.54 (Sheffield, 2024); 5000m: 13:47.61 (Watford, 2024); 10,000m: 29:19.52 (Pacé, 2025); Road; 5km: 14:05 (London, 2024); 10km 27:40 (Valencia, 2026); Half Marathon 1:01:26 (Valencia, 2025); Marathon: 2:11:31 (London, 2026)

Alfie Manthorpe (born 26 September 1999) is a British middle-distance and long-distance runner.

== Biography ==
A member of the Hallamshire Harriers, Manthorpe is originally from Mosborough, Sheffield, although he was later based in Manchester.

Manthorpe won the England Athletics 10k Road Running Championships in Telford on 15 December 2021. In November 2023, Manthorpe ran the quickest 5-mile time in the UK in 2023 with 23:29. In February 2024, Manthorpe finished seventh over 3000 metres at the 2024 British Indoor Athletics Championships in Birmingham. He placed third at the UK Athletics 5K Road Running Championships on 6 September 2024. At the 2024 Malaga Half Marathon in December, Manthorpe was first across the finish line acting as a pacer, finishing in 1:02:29.

In January 2025, Manthorpe ran a 10k run personal best of 28:12 in Valencia, Spain. He was selected for the British 10 km team to run at the 2025 European Running Championships in Belgium in April 2025, where he placed 32nd overall. He placed fifth at the Great Manchester Run in England on 18 May 2025. The following week he placed eleventh in the 2025 European 10,000m Cup B Race in Pacé, Ille-et-Vilaine, France. In August 2025, he ran as part of a team which completed a 607 km relay run challenge across Iceland, alongside William Goodge and 'Hardest Geezer' Russ Cook, amongst others. That month, he had a top-ten finish over 5000 metres at the 2025 UK Athletics Championships.

Manthorpe won the Sheffield 10k in September 2025 in 29:50. He ran a personal best by over nine minutes of 61:26 at the 2025 Valencia Half Marathon in October. Competing in Valencia on 11 January 2026, he also ran a personal best over 10 km, with his 27:40 gun time moving him to third on the British all-time list (with a 27:38 chip time). On 15 March, he placed third behind Joe Wigfield and Phil Sesemann at the official British Athletics trial race for the half marathon at the 2026 World Athletics Road Running Championships, held at the Bath Half Marathon in 62:14, with seven seconds separating the front three finishers. In April, he ran 2:11:31 for a top-twenty finish at the 2026 London Marathon. In September, he represented Great Britain at the 2026 World Athletics Road Running Championships in Copenhagen and placed 55th with a time of 62:40 for the half marathon.

In October 2026, Manthorpe signed a professional running contract with Skechers. and announced his goal to participate in the marathon at the 2028 Summer Olympics in Los Angeles.
