= Awet Nftalem Kibrab =

Norwegian long-distance runner (born 1995)

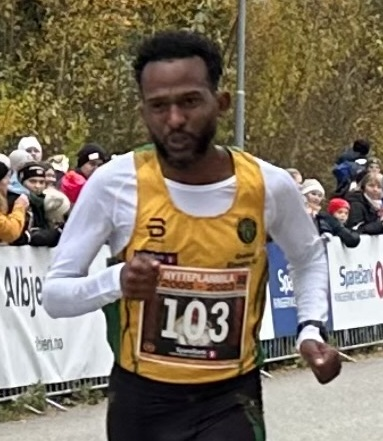

Personal information
- Born: 9 May 1995 (age 31)

Sport
- Sport: Athletics
- Event(s): Long distance running, Cross country running
- Club: IK Tjalve; Ullensaker/Kisa IL
Medal record
Men's athletics
Representing Norway
European Running Championships
Silver medal – second place	2025 Brussels	Half-marathon

Awet Nftalem Kibrab (born 9 May 1995) is an Eritrean-born Norwegian long-distance runner. He was a silver medalist at the 2025 European Running Championships in the half marathon.

== Biography ==
He was born in Eritrea, representing the country at the 2013 World Youth Championships. He joined the club IK Tjalve. Together with compatriot Senay Fissehatsion he moved to Ull/Kisa, before rejoining Tjalve in 2025.

Kibrab began representing Norway internationally in June 2023. He made his international debut in a Norwegian vest at the 2023 World Athletics Road Running Championships in Riga, Latvia, where he finished eighth in the 5 km in a time of 13:28.

He won the silver medal behind Frenchman Jimmy Gressier in the Half Marathon race at the 2025 European Running Championships on 12 April 2025 in Leuven, Belgium.

In August 2025, he won his first national title, winning the 10,000 meters after a largely solo run and resultant personal best time of 28:06.36. In September, he competed over 10,000 metres at the 2025 World Championships in Tokyo, Japan, finishing in seventeenth place.

In December 2025 he set a Norwegian record in marathon with the time 2:04.24 at the 2025 Valencia Marathon, beating Sondre Nordstad Moen's previous record of 2:05.48 from 2017. The time moved him to sixth on the European all-time list.

On 12 April, he finished fifth in 2:05:46 at the 2026 Paris Marathon.
