= Etienne Daguinos =

French runner (born 2000)

Personal information
- Nationality: France
- Born: 15 February 2000 (age 26)
- Home town: Bordeaux, France
- Height: 180 cm (5 ft 11 in)
- Weight: 63 kg (139 lb)

Sport
- Sport: Athletics
- Events: 3000 metres 5000 metres
- Club: US Talence Athlétisme

Achievements and titles
- National finals: 2017 French U18s; • 3000 m, 3rd (bronze); 2018 French U20 XC; • 7.7km XC, 1st (gold); 2019 French U20 XC; • 7.8km XC, 1st (gold); 2020 French Champs; • 5000 m, 7th; 2021 French Indoors; • 3000 m, 9th; 2021 French Champs; • 5000 m, 8th; 2021 French U23s; • 5000 m, 2nd (silver); 2022 French XC; • 10.29km XC, 10th; 2022 French U23s; • 5000 m, 1st (gold); • 1500 m, 3rd (bronze); 2022 French 5K; • 5km, road, 2nd (silver); 2023 French XC; • 9.81km XC, 7th; 2023 French Champs; • 5000 m, 2nd (silver)
- Personal bests: 3000 m: 7:43.42sh (2024) 5000 m: 12:57.49 (2025) 10 km: 27.04 (2024)
Medal record
Men's athletics
Representing France
European Championships
Bronze medal – third place	2026 Birmingham	5000 m
European Running Championships
Silver medal – second place	2025 Brussels	10,000 metres
European Cross Country Championships
Silver medal – second place	2022 Turin	U23 team
Mediterranean U23 Championships
Gold medal – first place	2022 Pescara	5000 m
- Updated on 20 February 2024

Etienne Daguinos (born 15 February 2000) is a French middle- and long-distance runner. With a 5000 metres best of 13:15.26, he was the 2022 Mediterranean Athletics U23 Championships gold medallist and he represented France at the 2023 World Athletics Road Running Championships.

== Career ==
Specializing in the 3000 metres since 2016, Daguinos contested that discipline at the 2017 French U20 Championships, where he finished 3rd. He won his first national title in the U20 race at the 2018 French Cross Country Championships.

A successful title defense at the 2019 French Cross Country Championships qualified him for the 2019 World Cross Country Championships, where he competed in the U20 race and finished 54th, contributing to the French team's 10th-place showing. In his first international track competition at the 2019 European Athletics U20 Championships, Daguinos finished in 21st place in the 5000 m. Daguinos' 86th-place performance at the 2019 European Cross Country Championships U20 race helped the French team place 5th and end his season.

After racing mainly domestically in 2020 and 2021 due to the COVID-19 pandemic, Daguinos improved his 5000 metres personal best from 13:45 to 13:26 at the 2022 IFAM Oordegem meeting, and in September he won the 2022 Mediterranean Athletics U23 Championships in that event. He won his first continental medal at the 2022 European Cross Country Championships, finishing 4th overall in the U23 race behind countryman Valentin Bresc to lead his team to the silver medal.

At the 2023 European 10,000m Cup, Daguinos placed 16th in his international debut at that distance. But it was Daguinos' earlier 5000 m personal best of 13:15.26 at the IFAM Oordegem meeting that earned him qualification to the inaugural 2023 World Athletics Road Running Championships, where he finished 6th in the 5K run.

== Personal life ==
Daguinos is from Bordeaux where he trains with the US Talence Athlétisme club, occasionally also training in Font-Romeu. In 2023, he completed the third year of his degree in economics and accounting, though he put graduate school on pause to pursue qualification for the 2024 Summer Olympics.

Daguinos has also participated in some trail running races, typically running between 100 and 110 kilometres per week in training.

== Statistics ==
=== Personal best progression ===
3000 m progression
#	Mark	Pl.	Competition	Venue	Date	Ref.
1	8:48.94	2nd place, silver medalist(s)	Circuit des Meetings LAA Talence	Talence, France	14 Jun 2016	
2	8:47.39	7th	Championnats Individuels Qualificatifs Salle	Bordeaux, France	13 Jan 2017	
3	8:44.94	2nd place, silver medalist(s)	Interclubs Nouvelle-Aquitaine 1er Tour National	Bordeaux, France	6 May 2017	
4	8:29.75	6th	Championnat de France des Clubs N1a Poule B	Pontoise, France	20 May 2017	
5	8:25.27	4th	Meeting à Thème d'Angoulême	Angoulême, France	6 Jun 2017	
6	8:19.47	2nd place, silver medalist(s)	Championnats Régionaux Demi-Fond Aura	Bron, France	14 Jun 2019	
7	8:05.51	4th	Meeting Elite en Salle de Miramas	Miramas, France	21 Jan 2021	
8	8:04.82	9th	French Athletics Championships	Miramas, France	18 Feb 2021	
9	8:04.99	1st place, gold medalist(s)	Championnat De France Des Clubs Elite 1	Grenoble, France	21 May 2022	
10	7:53.90	1st place, gold medalist(s)	Championnat de France des Clubs Elite 2	Talence, France	20 May 2023	
11	7:53.84+	8th	Meeting de Paris	Paris, France	8 Jun 2023	
12	7:43.42	5th	Metz Moselle Athleor	Metz, France	2 Feb 2024	

5000 m progression
#	Mark	Pl.	Competition	Venue	Date	Ref.
1	14:31.07	13th (Round B)	Meeting National de Carquefou	Carquefou, France	20 Jun 2019	
2	14:01.21	7th	French Athletics Championships	Albi, France	11 Sep 2020	
3	13:55.50	9th	Mid Summer Track Night	Wien, Austria	14 May 2021	
4	13:45.80	1st place, gold medalist(s)	Meeting Christian Carmel	Pessac, France	29 Apr 2022	
5	13:26.41	10th	IFAM Oordegem	Oordegem, Belgium	27 May 2022	
6	13:15.26	5th	IFAM Oordegem	Oordegem, Belgium	26 May 2023	
7	12:57.49	9th	2025 Meeting de Paris	Paris, France	20 June 2025	
