= 2013 World Youth Championships in Athletics – Boys' 3000 metres =

Boys' 3000 metres at the 2013 World Youth Championships in Athletics
- Venue: RSC Olimpiyskiy
- Dates: 11 July (heats); 14 July (final)
- Competitors: 27
- Winning time: 7:53.56 PB

Medalists
gold medal	Yomif Kejelcha	Ethiopia
silver medal	Vedic Kipkoech	Kenya
bronze medal	Alexander Mutiso Munyao	Kenya

The boys' 3000 metres at the 2013 World Youth Championships in Athletics was held on 11 and 14 July.

== Medalists ==
Gold	Silver	Bronze
Yomif Kejelcha; Ethiopia	Vedic Kipkoech; Kenya	Alexander Mutiso Munyao; Kenya

== Records ==
Prior to the competition, the following records were as follows.

World Youth Best	Abreham Cherkos (ETH)	7:32.37	Lausanne, Switzerland	11 July 2006
Championship Record	William Malel Sitonik (KEN)	7:40.10	Lille, France	10 July 2011
World Youth Leading	Vedic Kipkoech (KEN)	7:52.0	Nairobi, Kenya	11 June 2013

== Heats ==
Qualification rule: first 5 of each heat (Q) plus the 5 fastest times (q) qualified.

=== Heat 1 ===
Rank	Name	Nationality	Time	Notes
1	Vedic Kipkoech	Kenya	8:26.25	Q
2	Mogos Tuemay	Ethiopia	8:26.69	Q
3	Awet Nftalem Kibrab	Eritrea	8:27.23	Q
4	Suguru Hirosue	Japan	8:30.26	Q
5	Josh Shanks	Canada	8:32.36	Q
6	Yohanes Chiappinelli	Italy	8:39.24	q, PB
7	El Hocine Zourkane	Algeria	8:42.83	q
8	James Sugira	Rwanda	8:45.49	
9	Jure Josipović	Croatia	8:46.07	
10	Martín Acebes	Spain	8:56.81	
11	Yann Schrub	France	8:57.41	
12	Bogdan Bălăşoiu	Romania	9:08.74	
13	Ayetullah Belir	Turkey	9:31.59	

=== Heat 2 ===
Rank	Name	Nationality	Time	Notes
1	Yomif Kejelcha	Ethiopia	8:22.11	Q
2	Alexander Mutiso Munyao	Kenya	8:25.30	Q
3	Denis Bashkirtsev	Russia	8:29.55	Q, PB
4	Takeshi Okada	Japan	8:31.68	Q
5	Enis Korkmaz	Turkey	8:34.12	Q, PB
6	Tawfiq Bouziane	Algeria	8:34.17	q, PB
7	Abubaker Haydar Abdalla	Qatar	8:36.08	q, PB
8	Lahcen Ait Alibou	Spain	8:39.46	q
9	Nathan Wadhwani	Canada	8:42.90	
10	Harry Sichaly	Malawi	8:44.25	
11	Moeketsi Sekosana	South Africa	8:53.12	
12	Abdalla Targan Yousif	Sudan	8:59.68	
13	Andriy Ivakhin	Ukraine	9:11.51	
	Andemichael Miebale	Eritrea	DQ	

== Final ==
Rank	Name	Nationality	Time	Notes
1st place, gold medalist(s)	Yomif Kejelcha	Ethiopia	7:53.56	PB
2nd place, silver medalist(s)	Vedic Kipkoech	Kenya	7:55.60	
3rd place, bronze medalist(s)	Alexander Mutiso Munyao	Kenya	7:56.86	PB
4	Mogos Tuemay	Ethiopia	8:03.83	PB
5	Awet Nftalem Kibrab	Eritrea	8:05.19	PB
6	Suguru Hirosue	Japan	8:24.37	PB
7	Denis Bashkirtsev	Russia	8:26.71	PB
8	Takeshi Okada	Japan	8:27.06	
9	El Hocine Zourkane	Algeria	8:27.43	PB
10	Yohanes Chiappinelli	Italy	8:27.76	PB
11	Tawfiq Bouziane	Algeria	8:35.53	
12	Josh Shanks	Canada	8:50.16	
13	Enis Korkmaz	Turkey	9:04.68	
14	Abubaker Haydar Abdalla	Qatar	9:13.96	
	Lahcen Ait Alibou	Spain	DQ	
