= Klara Lukan =

Slovenian long-distance runner

Personal information
- Nationality: Slovenian
- Born: 8 September 2000 (age 26) Šentjernej, Slovenia
- Height: 1.66 m (5 ft 5 in)
- Weight: 56 kg (123 lb)

Sport
- Sport: Athletics
- Event: 3000 metres
Medal record
Women's athletics
Representing Slovenia
European Running Championships
Bronze medal – third place	2025 Brussels	10 km
Summer World University Games
Gold medal – first place	2025 Bochum	10,000 m
Mediterranean Games
Silver medal – second place	2026 Taranto	Half marathon

Klara Lukan (born 8 September 2000) is a Slovenian athlete. She competed in the women's 3000 metres event at the 2021 European Athletics Indoor Championships.
