= 2016 European Athletics Championships – Men's 5000 metres =

Olympic stadium

Men's 5000 metres at the 2016 European Athletics Championships
- Venue: Olympic Stadium
- Location: Amsterdam
- Dates: 10 July (final)
- Competitors: 20 from 12 nations
- Winning time: 13:40.85

Medalists
gold medal	Ilias Fifa	Spain
silver medal	Adel Mechaal	Spain
bronze medal	Richard Ringer	Germany

The men's 5000 metres at the 2016 European Athletics Championships took place at the Olympic Stadium on 10 July.

== Summary ==
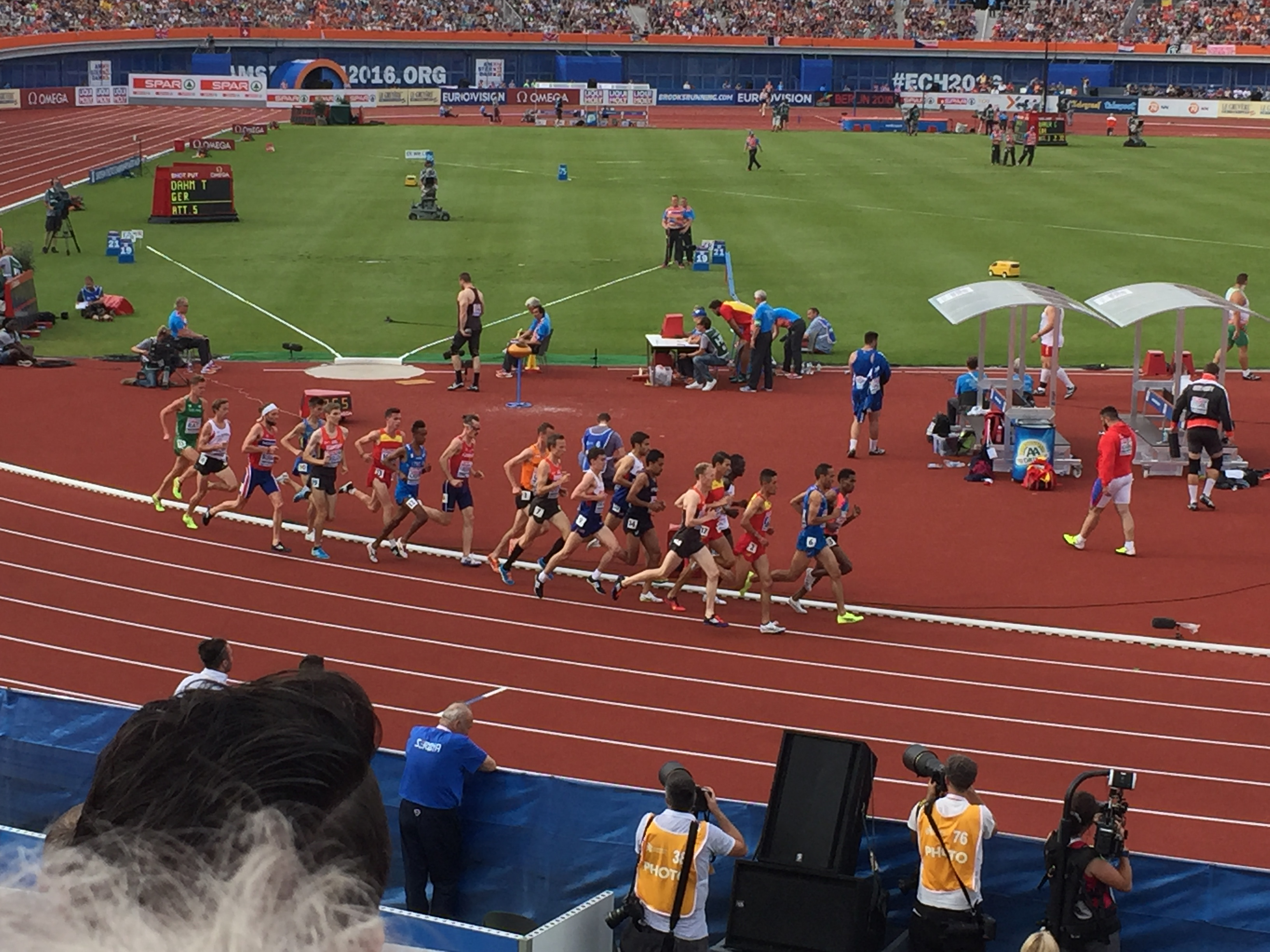
The race

This race had one of the closest finishes in championship distance racing. Coming off the turn, Ethiopian born Azerbaijani Hayle Ibrahimov held the curb and lead position. He held off all challenges to the position until the final straightaway, when the crowd of trailers passed him. Spaniard Adel Mechaal was pressuring in the more common outside shoulder position, so Ibrahimov came off the turn a little wide to force Mechaa to run extra distance, but that opened the door for Frenchman Mourad Amdouni to squeeze through on the inside. Behind them German Richard Ringer went wider into lane 2, followed by Norwegian Henrik Ingebrigtsen on the outside of lane 2. Trailing the group down the backstretch, Moroccan born Spaniard Ilias Fifa had just about made up the gap and was catching the back of the lead group as the sprinting began. Ibrahimov was unable to keep up, overstriding Mechaal, and held the edge over Amdouni, but Ringer and Ingebrigtsen were closing fast on the outside, still trailed by Fifa. Similar to Ibrahimov earlier, Ringer went wide to force Ingebrigtsen to run wider. That opened up a gap for Fifa to squeeze by on the inside of Ringer, outside of his teammate Mechaal. Fifa, Mechaal, Ringer, Ingebrigtsen and Amdouni hit the finish line as a wall, Amdouni was clearly the loser but the other four had to be separated by photo finish. It was ruled that the fast closing Fifa won, Mechaal second and Ringer third, all given the same time 13:40.85 accurate to a hundredth of a second. Ingebrigtsen was the odd man out, given a time of 13:40.86. Fifth place Amdouni was only .09 behind the winner. In comparison at these championships, fifth place in the 100 metres was .12 behind the winner (though the first two places did receive the same time in that race too).

== Records ==
Standing records prior to the 2016 European Athletics Championships
World record	Kenenisa Bekele (ETH)	12:37.35	Hengelo, Netherlands	31 May 2004
European record	Mohammed Mourhit (BEL)	12:49.71	Brussels, Belgium	25 August 2000
Championship record	Jack Buckner (GBR)	13:10.15	Stuttgart, West Germany	31 August 1986
World Leading	Muktar Edris (ETH)	12:59.43	Eugene, United States	28 May 2016
European Leading	Ilias Fifa (ESP)	13:11.83	Huelva, Spain	3 June 2016

== Schedule ==
Date	Time	Round
10 July 2016	18:10	Final

All times are local times (UTC+2)

== Results ==
=== Final ===
Rank	Name	Nationality	Time	Note
1st place, gold medalist(s)	Ilias Fifa	Spain	13:40.85	
2nd place, silver medalist(s)	Adel Mechaal	Spain	13:40.85	
3rd place, bronze medalist(s)	Richard Ringer	Germany	13:40.85	SB
4	Henrik Ingebrigtsen	Norway	13:40.86	
5	Mourad Amdouni	France	13:40.94	
6	Hayle Ibrahimov	Azerbaijan	13:42.20	
7	Florian Orth	Germany	13:45.40	
8	Yemaneberhan Crippa	Italy	13:46.30	
9	Aras Kaya	Turkey	13:47.42	
10	Martin Sperlich	Germany	13:48.81	
DQ	Jamel Chatbi	Italy	13:49.93	
11	Dennis Licht	Netherlands	13:54.21	
12	Jonathan Taylor	Great Britain	13:55.20	
13	Carlos Mayo	Spain	13:58.22	
14	Brenton Rowe	Austria	13:58.96	
15	Jonny Davies	Great Britain	14:04.13	
16	Kevin Batt	Ireland	14:20.50	
17	Sindre Buraas	Norway	14:26.05	
18	Mykola Nyzhnyk	Ukraine	14:28.24	
	Ali Kaya	Turkey	DNS	
