= Victoria Warpy =

Belgian athlete (born 1997)

Personal information
- Nationality: Belgian
- Born: 6 June 1997 (age 29)

Sport
- Sport: Athletics
- Event: Long distance running

Achievements and titles
- Personal bests: 5000m: 16:19.01 (Brugge, 2023); 10,000m 33:47.60 (Nijmegen, 2024); Half marathon 1:12:36 (Gentbrugge, 2024); Marathon 2:31:50 (Rotterdam, 2026)
Medal record
Representing Belgium
European Cross Country Championships
Gold medal – first place	2025 Lagoa	Team
Bronze medal – third place	2024 Antalya	Team

Victoria Warpy (born 6 June 1997) is a Belgian long distance runner. The winner of the Antwerp Marathon in 2021, she won a bronze medal in the team event at the 2024 European Cross Country Championships.

== Biography ==
From Leuven, she studied physiotherapy at the University of Leuven and ran as a hobby. Coming to competitive athletics late, she ran the 2021 Antwerp Marathon, and was a surprise winner with a time of 3:02:12. The race also doubled-up as the Belgian National Championships. However, she did not receive the title because she was not affiliated with an official club.

After that result, she began to be coached by Bart Raes and she went on to improve her marathon personal best by 15 minutes the following year. In 2023, at the Belgian Cross Country Championship in Brussels, she achieved a fourth-place finish. She ran the Runners' lab Half Marathon in Gentbrugge – also considered the Belgian Championship – and won the bronze medal by running a new best time of 74.04. That year, she also finished third on the track in the 5000 metres at the 2023 Belgian Athletics Championships. She was selected for the 2023 European Cross Country Championships in Brussels, where she placed 32nd overall.

At the Rotterdam Marathon in April 2024 she ran a new personal best time of 2:37:32.

In November 2024, she secured a place at the Belgian national cross country championships for the upcoming European Championships. She won a bronze medal in the team race at the 2024 European Cross Country Championships in Antalya, Turkey in December 2024.

She won a bronze medal in the team race at the 2025 European Running Championships in Belgium. In December 2025 at the 2025 European Cross Country Championships in Lagoa, Portugal, she finished in thirty second place and won gold in the senior women's team event, with compatriots Jana Van Lent, Lisa Rooms and Chloé Herbiet finishing in the top ten.

In August 2026, she competed at the 2026 European Athletics Championships in Birmingham, England, in the women's marathon.
