= Fadime Suna =

Turkish runner (born 1986)

Personal information
- Full name: Fadime Suna Çelik
- Nationality: Turkey
- Born: October 25, 1986 (age 39)
- Died: Eskişehir, Turkey
- Height: 1.66 m (5.4 ft)
- Weight: 50 kg (110 lb)

Sport
- Sport: Middle-distance and long-distance
- Club: Beşiktaş J.K. Athletics Team

Achievements and titles
- Personal bests: 1500 m 4:09.92 (2011); 5000 m 15:31.47 (2011); 10,000 m 33:11.92 (2011); 3000 m st 11:04 (2004)
Medal record
Women's athletics
Representing Turkey
Summer Universiades
Gold medal – first place	2011 Shenzhen	10,000 m

Fadime Suna Çelik (born October 25, 1986, in Eskişehir) is a Turkish female middle-distance and long-distance runner. She is a member of the Beşiktaş J.K. Athletics Team in Istanbul.

Fadime Suna began her athletic career after an unsuccessful start in basketball in primary school. She says she is thankful to her teacher, who drew her attention to running.

She won the gold medal in the 10,000 m event at the 2011 Summer Universiade held in Shenzhen, China.

In 2019, she competed in the women's marathon at the 2019 World Athletics Championships held in Doha, Qatar, however, she did not finish her race.

== Achievements ==
Year	Competition	Venue	Position	Event	Notes
Representing Turkey
2011	Summer Universiade	Shenzhen, China	Gold	10,000 m	33:11.92
