= Valentin Gondouin =

French long-distance runner (born 1999)

Personal information
- Born: 4 March 1999 (age 27) Flers, France
- Height: 177 cm (5 ft 10 in)
- Weight: 60 kg (132 lb)

Sport
- Country: France
- Sport: Athletics
- Events: Long distance running; Cross country running
Medal record
Men's athletics
Representing France
European Athletics Championships
Bronze medal – third place	2026 Birmingham	Marathon team
European Running Championships
Bronze medal – third place	2025 Brussels	Half-marathon
European 10,000m Cup
Silver medal – second place	2025 Pacé	10,000 m
Bronze medal – third place	2026 La Spezia	10,000 m
European U23 Championships
Bronze medal – third place	2021 Tallinn	10000 m
European Cross Country Championships
Gold medal – first place	2022 Turin	Team
Bronze medal – third place	2021 Dublin	U23 team

Valentin Gondouin (born 4 March 1999) is a French long-distance runner.

== Biography ==
Gondouin was a bronze medalist over 10,000 metres at the 2021 European Athletics U23 Championships in Tallinn, Estonia. He won the bronze medal in the U23 team event at the 2021 European Cross Country Championships in Dublin, Ireland.

Gondouin was a member of the French gold medal winning team at the 2022 European Cross Country Championships in Turin, Italy, finishing twentieth overall in his debut senior race. Competing in April 2023, he became French champion over 10,000 metres. In October 2023, he finished 23rd in the half marathon at the World Road Running Championships in Riga.

In March 2025 in Lille, he ran a personal best 27:23 over 10 km on the road, the fourth fastest French time in history over this distance. He was a bronze medalist in the Half Marathon race at the 2025 European Running Championships on 12 April 2025 in Leuven, Belgium. He won the silver medal at the 2025 European 10,000m Cup in May 2025 in Pacé, France. He competed in the 2025 Diamond League at the 2025 Meeting de Paris.

Gondouin was selected to represent France at the 2026 World Athletics Cross Country Championships in Tallahassee, Florida, placing 34th overall. In May, he won the bronze medal in the individual race and team gold for France at the 2026 European 10,000m Cup in La Spezia, Italy. On 16 August, he finished in sixth place with a time of 2:09:34 in the marathon at the 2026 European Championships in Birmingham, which helped France win the team bronze medal.

== Personal life ==
He was born in Flers, Orne, Normandy.
