= Eduardo Menacho =

Spanish long-distance runner (born 1999)

Personal information
- Born: 25 November 1999 (age 26)

Sport
- Sport: Athletics
- Event: Long-distance running

Achievements and titles
- Personal best(s): 3000m: 7:49.73 (2025); 5000m: 13:36.17 (2025); 10,000m: 28:05.33 (2025); Road; 5k: 13:47 (2024); 10k: 28:10 (2024)
Medal record
Men's athletics
Representing Spain
European 10,000m Cup
Silver medal – second place	2025 Pacé	10,000 m team
European U23 Championships
Gold medal – first place	2021 Tallinn	10000 m

Eduardo Menacho (born 25 November 1999) is a Spanish long-distance runner. He won the Spanish national title over 10,000 metres in 2025 and 2026.

== Biography ==
From Zaragoza, Menacho won the 2021 European Athletics U23 Championships over 10,000 metres in Tallinn, Estonia, running 29:14.92.

In March 2024, he was runner-up in the 10,000 metres Spanish championships race in 28:07.37. In June, he represented Spain in the 10,000 metres at the 2024 European Athletics Championships in Rome, Italy, marking his senior international debut for Spain, winning the B race and placing 19th overall in 28.25.62.

Menacho won the Spanish 10,000 metres national title in 2025. Competing at the 2025 European 10,000m Cup in Pacé, France, he placed fifth with a personal best time of 28:05.33, helping the Spanish team to the silver medal.

Menacho won the Spanish 10,000 metres national title in 2026 in Mahón with a time of 28:07.36.
