= Beşiktaş J.K. (athletics) =

Beşiktaş Athletics Team
- Full name: Beşiktaş J.K. Athletics Team
- Nickname: The Female Black Eagles
- Short name: Beşiktaş Athletics
- Founded: 1903
- Ground: Istanbul, Turkey
- Chairman: Ahmet Nur Çebi
- Manager: Ömer Aras
- League: Turkish Women's Athletics League
- Website: http://www.bjk.com.tr/tr/

Beşiktaş J.K. Athletics Team is the women's athletics section of Beşiktaş J.K., a major sports club in Istanbul, Turkey.

== Current squad ==
=== Technical staff ===
Name	Nat.	Job
Ömer Aras	(Turkey)	Manager general
Seda Özdemir	(Turkey)	Coach
Sibel Yılmaz	(Turkey)	Coach
Tülay Karaduman	(Turkey)	Coach
Lütfi Yılmaz	(Turkey)	Coach
Tuncay Kayacan	(Turkey)	Coach
Arif Kara	(Turkey)	Coach

=== Captains ===
Name	Nat.	Job
Hediye Işık Gürbüzoğulları	(Turkey)	A team
Bilge Zeynep Yıldırım	(Turkey)	Youth team
Sena Hıdırlar	(Turkey)	Youth girls team
Ezgi Doğan	(Turkey)	U-16 team

=== Current squad ===
==== A team ====
Turkey

- Sibel Ağan
- Büşra Akay (born 2005), sprinter
- Nurdem Aksu
- Gülüşan Aras
- Arzu Berk
- Hatice Sultan Elgün
- Esra Güllü
- Hediye Işık
- Narin Kahraman
- Şeyma Karagöz
- Ezgi Kaya (born 2001), long-distance runner
- Hülya Ongun
- Deniz Öz
- Türkan Özata
- Mehtap Sızmaz
- Şefika Soytürk
- Fadime Suna
- Tuğçe Şahutoğlu
- Mukadder Ulusoy
- Arzu Uyar
- Ayşenur Yazıcıoğlu

== Achievements ==
- Istanbul Athletics Clubs Championship
  - Winners (4): 1929, 1930, 1958, 1960
  - Runners (6): 1952, 1955, 1956, 1957, 1959, 1962
