= Ezgi Kaya =

Turkish long-distance runner (born 2001)

Personal information
- Nationality: Turkish
- Born: 1 January 2001 (age 25) Turkey
- Home town: Turkey
- Education: Istanbul Gedik University

Sport
- Country: Turkey
- Sport: Long-distance running
- Event(s): 5000 m, 10,000 m, half marathon
- Team: Beşiktaş Athletics
Medal record
Women's Athletics
Representing Turkey
FISU World University Games
Bronze medal – third place	2025 Bochum	Half marathon Team

Ezgi Kaya (born 1 January 2001) is a Turkish female long-distance runner, who competes in the 5000 m, 10,000 m and half marathon events.

== Personal life ==
Ezgi Kaya was born on 1 January 2001. She works as a teacher in the kindergarten of a Beşiktaş J.K. club facility.

== Sport career ==
Kaya is a member of Beşiktaş Athletics in Istanbul.

In 2021, she finished the 9 km road run at the MarmaRUN in Beykoz, Istanbul in the second place, and the 10 km event at the Gazi Half Marathon and 10 km Road Run in Gaziantep, Turkey in the third place with 36.45.

She competed at the 2025 Summer World University Games in Bochum, Germany, and won the bronze medal in the half marathon team event with teammates Nursena Çeto and Dilek Öztürk.
