= Ilias Fifa =

Spanish long-distance runner (born 1989)

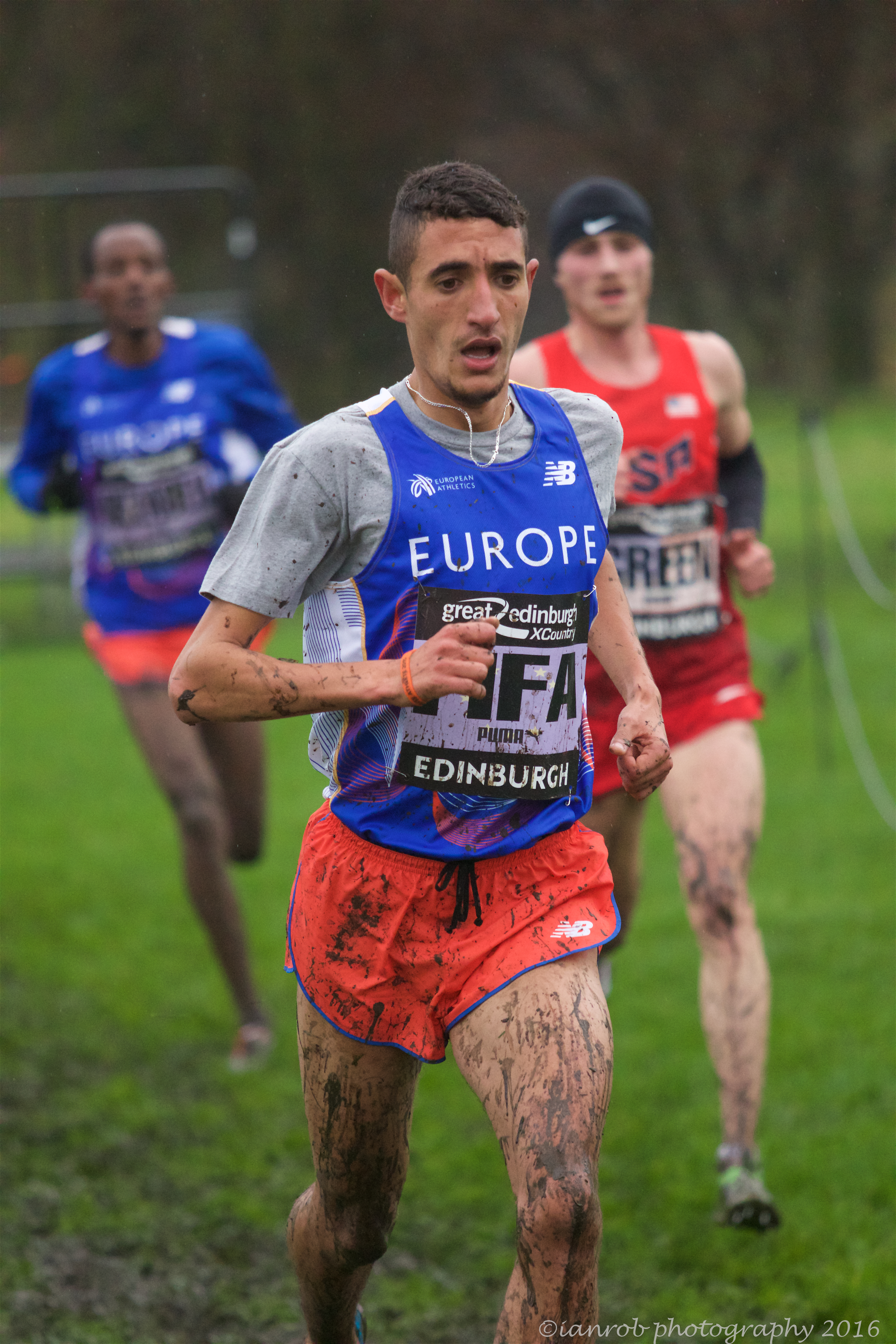
- Fifa in 2016

Personal information
- Born: 16 May 1989 (age 37) Tangier, Morocco

Sport
- Country: Spain
- Sport: Track and field
- Event: 5000 metres
- Club: F.C. Barcelona
- Coached by: Rafael Caro
Medal record
Men's athletics
Representing Spain
European Championships
Gold medal – first place	2016 Amsterdam	5000 m

Ilias Fifa (born 16 May 1989) is a long-distance runner. Born in Morocco, he competes internationally for Spain. He gained Spanish citizenship in July 2015 after entering Spain nine years earlier by hiding under a truck crossing the border.

== Career ==
He won the 2016 European Championship 5000 metres, in one of the closest long distance finishes ever. Video on YouTube

He participated in the 5000 metres at the 2015 World Championships in Beijing but with a time of 13:28.29 he did not reach the final. He qualified for the 5000 m event at the 2016 Summer Olympics, where he finished in a non-qualifying 9th place in his heat.

In 2018, Spanish athlete Ilias Fifa was sanctioned with a four-year suspension for doping violations. He was penalised by the Spanish Anti-Doping Agency (AEPSAD) following his arrest in 2017 for possession of prohibited substances as part of "Operación Chamberí." The suspension began in May 2018 and included a financial fine of €15,000. The sanction significantly impacted his professional career, including the termination of his contract with FC Barcelona. After serving his suspension, Fifa returned to competition in running and athletics events.

== International competitions ==
Year	Competition	Venue	Position	Event	Notes
Representing Spain
2015	World Championships	Beijing, China	13th (h)	5000 m	13:28.29
2016	European Championships	Amsterdam, Netherlands	1st	5000 m	13:40.85
2016	Olympic Games	Rio de Janeiro, Brazil	23rd (h)	5000 m	13:30.23
2017	World Championships	London, United Kingdom	34th (h)	5000 m	13:47.90
2023	European 10,000m Cup	Pacé, France	3rd	10,000 m	28:12.62
2024	Ibero-American Championships	Cuiabá, Brazil	1st	10 km	29:41
2024	European Championships	Rome, Italy	8th	10,000 m	28:10.97
2025	European Running Championships	Leuven, Belgium	13th	10 km	28:32
2026	European Championships	Birmingham, United Kingdom	16th	Marathon	2:11:33

== Personal bests ==
Outdoor

- 3000 metres – 7:49.13 (Barcelona 2014)
- 5000 metres – 13:05.61 (Rome 2015)
