= William Goodge (athlete) =

British athlete

William Goodge (born April 30, 1994) is a British ultra-endurance athlete from Bedfordshire, England.

== Ultramarathon and endurance career ==
- In December 2020, Goodge ran 12 marathons in 12 days over Christmas.
- In 2021, Goodge completed 48 marathons in 30 days, one in each English county.
- In 2022, Goodge ran the 257 km Marathon des Sables across the Sahara.
- In 2023, Goodge completed a 3,175 mi (5,109 km) transcontinental run across the US, from Los Angeles to New York in 55 days, becoming the fastest Brit to do so.
- In April–May 2025, Goodge ran from Cottesloe Beach (Perth) to Bondi Beach (Sydney), covering some 3,800 km in 35 days, claiming a new Trans‑Australia world record, four days faster than Chris Turnbull's previous 39-day mark. He ran approximately 110 km/day.
- In August 2025, Goodge was one of a group of seven who ran a combined 377 miles (607km) along the northern coastline of Iceland in two days, led by George Heaton and alongside ultra-endurance runners Russ Cook and Hercules Nicolaou, with British international runner Alfie Manthorpe, and Jake Dearden and Lucy Davis.

== Criticism ==
Critics have questioned his GPS and heart-rate data, pointing to improbable speed deviations, though Goodge denies wrongdoing and used multiple fitness and GPS trackers with some observers following his run to verify it. Known for keeping heart rates in Zones 1–2 across long distances, with debates arising about whether such consistently low data is plausible. In May 2025, he claimed to have broken the world record for running across Australia, completing the 3,800 km in 35 days, but doubts were cast upon his attempt.

== See also ==
- List of people who have run across Australia
