= 2021 European Athletics U23 Championships – Men's 10,000 metres =

Men's 10,000 metres at the 2021 European Athletics U23 Championships
- Venue: Kadriorg Stadium, Tallinn
- Dates: 8 July
- Competitors: 24 from 14 nations
- Winning time: 29:14.92

Medalists
gold medal	Eduardo Menacho	Spain
silver medal	Florian Le Pallec	France
bronze medal	Valentin Gondouin	France

The men's 10,000 metres event at the 2021 European Athletics U23 Championships was held in Tallinn, Estonia, at Kadriorg Stadium on 8 July.

== Records ==
Prior to the competition, the records were as follows:

European U23 record	Ali Kaya (TUR)	27:24.09	Mersin, Turkey	2 May 2015
Championship U23 record	Ali Kaya (TUR)	27:53.38	Tallinn, Estonia	9 July 2015

== Results ==
Rank	Name	Nationality	Time	Notes
1st place, gold medalist(s)	Eduardo Menacho	Spain	29:14.92	PB
2nd place, silver medalist(s)	Florian Le Pallec	France	29:23.82	
3rd place, bronze medalist(s)	Valentin Gondouin	France	29:24.40	
4	Pasquale Selvarolo	Italy	29:25.56	
5	Luuk Maas	Netherlands	29:29.02	
6	Luca Ursano	Italy	29:32.39	PB
7	Vadym Lonskyy	Ukraine	29:37.24	PB
8	Pierre Bordeau	France	29:38.39	
9	Marios Anagnostou	Greece	29:38.96	SB
10	Ömer Amaçtan	Turkey	29:50.34	
11	David McGlynn	Ireland	29:53.06	
12	Artūrs Niklāvs Medveds	Latvia	30:11.32	PB
13	Hüseyin Can	Turkey	30:13.26	
14	Trym Tønnesen	Norway	30:21.60	
15	Dereje Chekole	Israel	30:46.98	
16	Ramazan Baştuğ	Turkey	30:54.87	
17	Erik Gundersen	Norway	31:07.01	
18	Luís Oliveira	Portugal	31:08.24	
19	David Melville	Great Britain	31:11.42	
	Max Polak	Netherlands	DNF	
	Emil Millán de la Oliva	Sweden	DNF	
	Simon Steinshamn	Norway	DNF	
	Matthew Neill	Ireland	DNF	
	Maikel Peeman	Netherlands	DNF	
