= Chloé Herbiet =

Belgian long-distance runner

Personal information
- Born: 3 December 1998 (age 27) Marche, Belgium

Sport
- Country: Belgium
- Sport: Track and field
- Events: Long-distance running Marathon
- Coached by: Thomas Vandormael

Achievements and titles
- Personal bests: 10000m: 31:54:06 (2025); Half marathon: 1:10:04 (2025); Marathon: 2:20:38 (2025)
Medal record
Representing Belgium
European Running Championships
Gold medal – first place	2025 Brussels	Half-marathon
European Cross Country Championships
Gold medal – first place	2025 Lagoa	Team
Bronze medal – third place	2023 Brussels	Team
European 10,000m Cup
Bronze medal – third place	2025 Pacé	10,000 m

Chloé Herbiet (born 3 December 1998) is a Belgian long-distance runner. She won the 2025 European Running Championships in the half marathon.

== Career ==
She became the Belgium cross-country and marathon champion in 2023, winning both titles for the first time that year. She won the marathon title in October 2023, running 2:27:53 at the Belgian Marathon Championships held in Eindhoven, Netherlands, in her debut over the distance. It was the third-fastest Belgian performance of all time with only Marleen Renders (2:23:05) and Hanne Verbruggen (2:26:32) ahead of her on the Belgian all-time list. Her cross country win came in Hulshout on 23 November 2023. Also in 2023, she won a bronze medal with the Belgium's women team at the European Cross Country Championships in Brussels, Belgium alongside Juliette Thomas, Lisa Rooms and Victoria Warpy.

She ran 2:24.56 over the marathon distance in February 2024 at the Seville Marathon to meet the Olympic standard. It was only her second marathon after she debuted at the Eindhoven marathon.

She competed in the women's 10,000 metres at the 2024 European Athletics Championships in Rome, Italy, finishing in tenth place overall in a time of 32:17.18. She competed for Belgium in the women's marathon event at the 2024 Summer Olympics but did not complete the course.

Competing in 2025, she set two personal bests on the roads, running the Valencia 10 km in Spain in 31:50 on 12 January 2025, and the half marathon in 70:04 in winning the Cannes Half Marathon on 23 February 2025 in France. She won the 2025 European Running Championships in the half marathon on 11 April 2025, the event held on home soil in Leuven, Belgium, winning in a time of 70:43 from compatriot Juliette Thomas. In May 2025, she ran a personal best 31:54:06 and won the bronze medal in the senior women's race at the European 10,000m Cup in Pacé, France.

In December 2025, Herbiet set a new personal best on the marathon in Valencia, Spain, finishing third in 2h20:38 and breaking the 23-years old Belgian national record of Marleen Renders. In doing so, she also became the fifth European on the all-time list. One weekend later at the 2025 European Cross Country Championships in Lagoa, Portugal, she finished seventh, just behind compatriots Jana Van Lent in fourth and Lisa Rooms in fifth, winning the gold for Belgium in the senior women's team event.

In March 2026, Herbiet set a new personal best on the half marathon in Berlin, Germany, finishing sixth in 1h07:32 and breaking the 24-years old Belgian national record of Marleen Renders. In August, she ran in the women's 10,000 metres at the 2026 European Athletics Championships in Birmingham, United Kingdom, finishing eleventh. In September, she finished as nineteenth and first European athlete in the women's half marathon at the 2026 World Athletics Road Running Championships in Copenhagen, Denmark.
