= Efrem Gidey =

Irish athlete (born 2000)

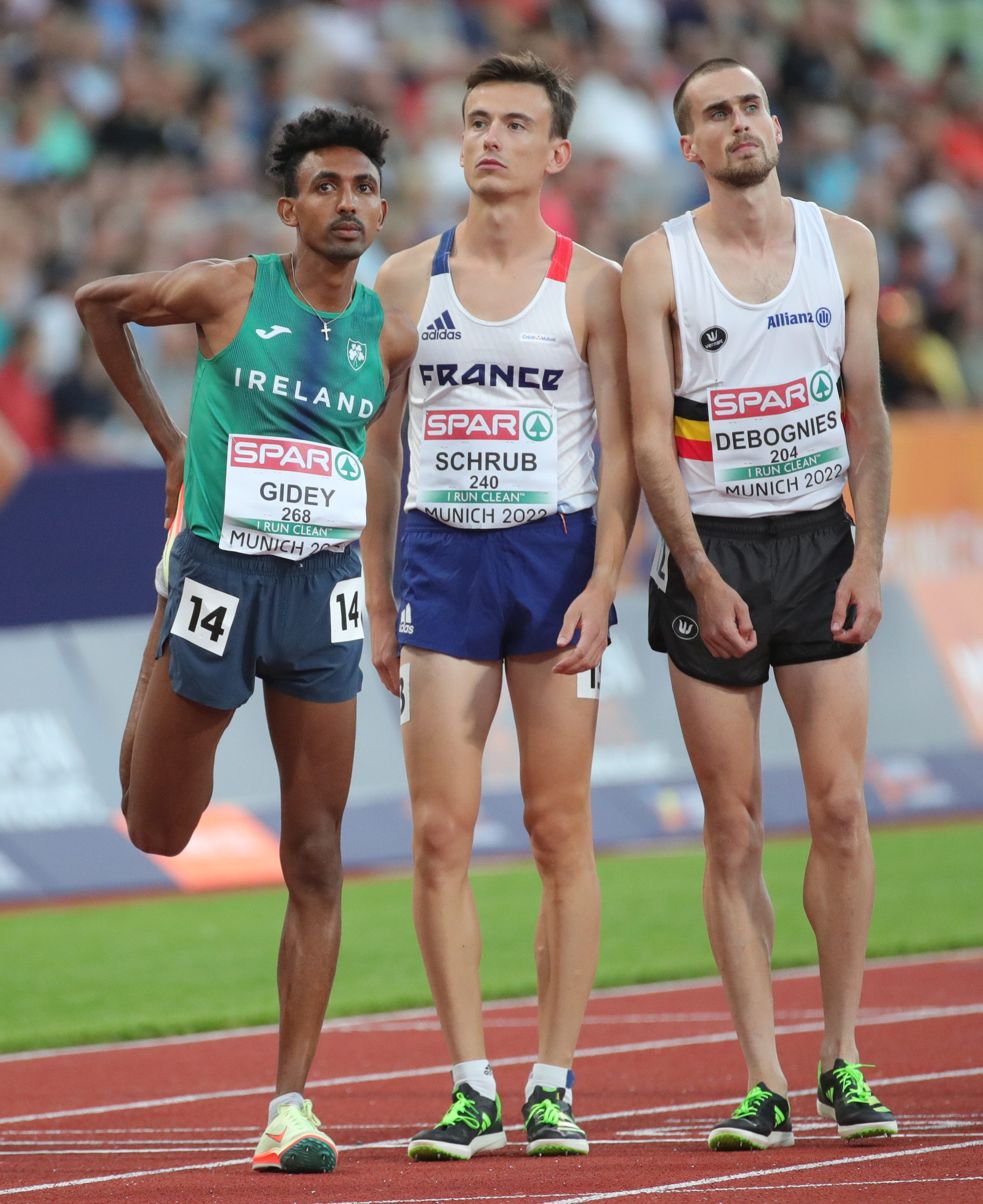
- Gidey at the 2022 European Athletics Championships

Personal information
- Nationality: Irish
- Born: 3 September 2000 (age 26)

Sport
- Sport: Athletics
- Event: Long distance running

Achievements and titles
- Personal bests: 3000m: 8:05.69 (Dublin, 2024); 5000m: 13:37.56 (Dublin, 2023); 10,000m: 27:26.95 (San Juan Capistrano, 2025); 10km (road) 27:38 (Valencia, 2026); Half marathon 1:00:51 (Copenhagen, 2024)
Medal record
Men's athletics
Representing Ireland
European 10,000m Cup
Gold medal – first place	2025 Pacé	10,000 m
European Cross Country Championships
Bronze medal – third place	2019 Lisbon	U20 Race

Efrem Gidey (born 3 September 2000) is an Irish long distance runner. He is the Irish record holder in the 10,000 metres, 10 km road race, and formerly the half marathon.

== Early life ==
Gidey fled Eritrea as a refugee in 2016 and spent six months at a refugee camp in Calais before arriving in Dublin in March 2017 when he was 16 years-old. He learned English at Le Chéile Secondary School in Tyrellstown, where he sat the Leaving Cert in 2019 and began training at Clonliffe Harriers under Joe Cooper. He later lived with Cooper's son Ian. He won the senior boys’ race at the Irish Schools Cross Country Championships and he won the senior boys’ 5,000m at the All-Ireland Schools Track and Field Championships in both 2018 and 2019. After Cooper's death in 2020 he continued a relationship with the family, with Cooper's wife Gladys and Ian supporting him at races.

== Career ==
Gidey received Irish citizenship in 2019. That year, he won the All Ireland Schools U20 men's 5000m race with a U20 national record time of 14:34.22. He won a bronze medal at the 2019 European Cross Country Championships in Lisbon in the U20 individual event, won by Jakob Ingebrigtsen.

Gidey finished sixth in the 10,000 metres at the 2022 European Athletics Championships in Munich. In October 2022, he set a course record in helping his Clonliffe team win the Northern Ireland and Ulster Road Relay Championships in Victoria Park, Belfast.

In September 2023, he finished fifth in the Great North Run in his debut run over the half marathon distance in a time of 1:04:3.

In January 2024, he ran a new personal best time of 27:56 competing in Valencia over 10 km on the road. Competing at the Night of 10,000m PB's meet in London on 18 May 2024, Gidey clocked 27:40.00 to go second on the all-time Irish list, and just 0.45 of a second from Alistair Cragg's national 10,000m record. He was selected for the Irish team for the 2024 European Athletics Championships.

He set an Irish record time of 1:00:51 at the Copenhagen half marathon in September 2024. In January 2025, he set a new Irish national record time of 27:43 at the 10K Valencia road race, improving the previous best set by John Treacy in 1985.

He set a new Irish senior 10,000m on 29 March 2025, running a time of 27:26.95 at The Ten meeting in San Juan Capistrano, California, to knock 13 seconds off the previous national record of Alistair Cragg. Competing in the Half Marathon race at the 2025 European Road Running Championships on 12 April 2025 in Leuven, Belgium, he finished in fourth place. He won gold at the 2025 European 10,000m Cup in May 2025. He finished second over 10,000m in Birmingham in June 2025, running a time of 28:09.36. In September 2025, he competed over 10,000 metres at the 2025 World Championships in Tokyo, Japan, finishing in nineteenth place.

On 11 January 2026, he set a new Irish 10 km national record in Valencia, with 27:38.

== Personal life ==
Gidey's family now live in Tigray, Ethiopia.
