= Georgina Schwiening =

English runner

Personal information
- Nationality: British (English)
- Born: 15 December 1994 (age 31) Cambridge, England

Sport
- Sport: Athletics
- Event: Marathon
- Club: Cambridge & Coleridge

Achievements and titles
- Personal best: Marathon 2:25:46

George Schwiening (born 15 December 1994) is an English international athlete. She has represented England at the Commonwealth Games.

== Biography ==
Schwiening was educated at the University of Bath and is a former World Junior Duathlon Champion. She switched to marathon running following problems over European duathlon Covid-related travel restrictions and disruption.

In 2022, she was selected for the women's marathon event at the 2022 Commonwealth Games in Birmingham, where she finished in 11th place in a time of 2:40:09. In December 2022 she took part in the Valencia marathon and finished in a time of 2:26:28.
