= Jana Van Lent =

Belgian athlete (born 2001)

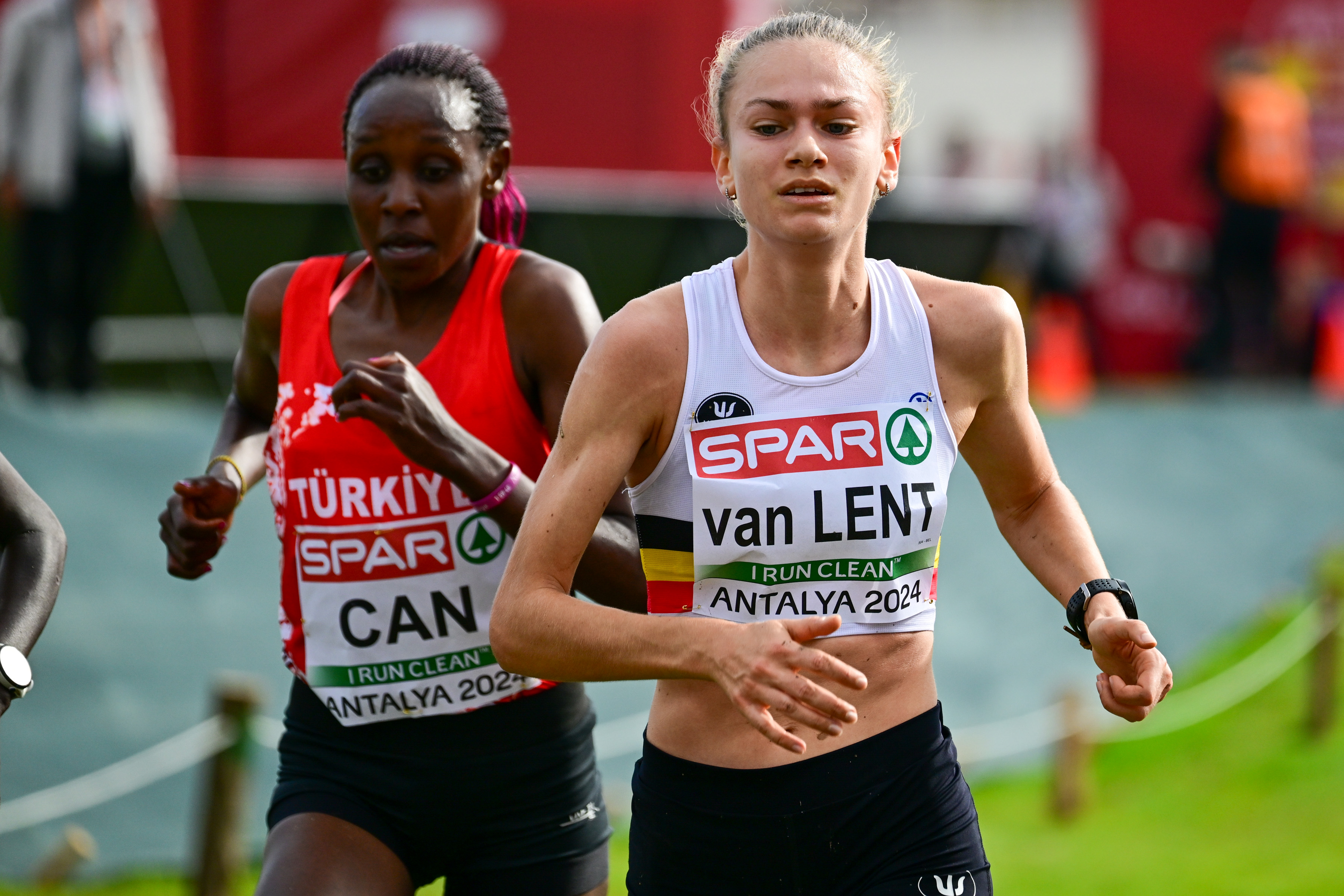
- Jana Van lent in action at the 2024 European Country Championships in Antalya, Turkey.

Personal information
- Nationality: Belgian
- Born: 22 April 2001 (age 25)

Sport
- Sport: Athletics
- Event: Long distance running
- Coached by: Geert Van Lent

Achievements and titles
- Personal bests: 3000 m: 8:36.14 (Monaco, 2026) NR; 5000 m: 14:37.47 (Brussels, 2025) NR; 10,000 m 30:51.18 (Louvian-la-Neuve, 2026) NR; Road; 5km: 14:48 (Monaco, 2026) NR; 10km 30:10 (Nice, 2026) NR
Medal record
Representing Belgium
Women's athletics
European Championships
| Bronze medal – third place | 2026 Birmingham | 10,000 m |
European Cross Country Championships
| Gold medal – first place | 2025 Lagoa | Team |
| Bronze medal – third place | 2024 Antalya | Team |
European 10,000m Cup
| Gold medal – first place | 2025 Pacé | 10,000 m |

Jana Van Lent (born 22 April 2001) is a Belgian long-distance runner. She won the Belgian national title over 10,000 metres in 2023. She finished fifth overall and won a bronze medal in the team race at the 2024 European Cross Country Championships, before winning the gold medal in the team event and having a fourth-place individual finish in 2025. That year, she set a Belgian national record on the track over 5000 metres. In 2026, she set Belgian national records competing over 5k and 10k on the road.

== Biography ==
She won the 10,000 metres at the 2023 Belgian Athletics Championships in Huizingen.

She finished seventh in the U23 race at the 2023 European Cross Country Championships in Brussels in December 2023. in February 2024, she was the overall winner of the CrossCup series in Belgium. In April 2024, she improved her 10,000 metres personal best to 32:45.22 in Oslo. The following month, she moved to sixth on the all-time Belgian list by running 31:59.57 for the 10,000 metres in London. She finished eleventh at the 2024 European Athletics Championships in Rome, Italy, in the Women's 10,000 metres in a June 2024.

In November 2024, she won the Belgian national cross country title. She subsequently finished fifth overall and won a bronze medal in the team race at the 2024 European Cross Country Championships in Antalya, Turkey in December 2024 alongside Lisa Rooms and Victoria Warpy.

In April 2025, she was named by Belgium for the European Running Championships in April 2025, to run in the 10 km road race. She set a new national record in May 2025 in the 5000 metres. That month, she also won the senior women's race at the European 10,000m Cup in Pacé, France. In July she twice bettered the national record in the 5000 metres, first at the Folksam Grand Prix in Karlstad, Sweden and then in the 2025 London Athletics Meet leg of that year's Diamond League in a time of 14:42.93 that qualified her for the World Championships. That record stood for only just over a month as she broke it again at the Brussels Memorial Van Damme meeting of the 2025 Diamond League setting a new best time of 14:37.47.

In September 2025, she competed over 5000 metres at the 2025 World Championships in Tokyo, Japan, without advancing to the final. At the championships, she also placed thirteenth in the women's 10,000 metres race. In December at the 2025 European Cross Country Championships in Lagoa, Portugal, she had a fourth-place finish, just ahead of compatriots Lisa Rooms in fifth and Chloe Herbiet in seventh, winning the gold for Belgium in the senior women's team event.

She started 2026 with good form, breaking the 10.000 metres European road record finishing first in the Nice, France Prom'Classic. Later in January 2026, she won the Lotto Cross Cup de Hannut. The following month, she lowered the Belgian national record in the 5k on the road to 14:48 in Monaco. In June, Van Lent broke the Belgian national record at the Belgian 10,000m Championships in Louvain-la-Neuve, running 30:51.18 to surpass the previous mark set by Marleen Renders in 2000. In July, she ran a personal best 8:36.14 for the 3000 metres at the 2026 Herculis event in Monaco. On 14 August 2026, Van Lent won the bronze medal in the 10,000 metres at the European Championships in Birmingham, England. With this bronze medal, she made Belgian athletics history. Never before had a Belgian woman won a European Athletics Championships medal in a middle- or long-distance event. In October, Van Lent clocked 67:39 on her first attempt in the half marathon in the Valencia Half Marathon to come within seven seconds of the Belgian record, a feat that contributed to her being voted European Athlete of the Month for October 2026.

== Personal life ==
She is from Mariekerke near Bornem in the Antwerp province. She studied nutrition and diet at the Erasmus Brussels University of Applied Sciences and Arts (EHB) in Brussels, and is a member of Excelsior Sports Club in Laeken.
