= Dilek Öztürk =

Turkish long-distance runner (born 2001)

Personal information
- Nationality: Turkish
- Born: 15 February 2001 (age 25) Turkey
- Home town: Turkey
- Education: Ağrı İbrahim Çeçen University

Sport
- Country: Turkey
- Sport: Long-distance running
- Events: 5000 m, 10,000 m, half marathon, cross country running
- Team: Fenerbahçe Athletics
Medal record
Women's Athletics
Representing Turkey
FISU World University Games
Bronze medal – third place	2025 Bochum	Half marathon Team

Dilek Öztürk (born 15 February 2001) is a Turkish female long-distance runner, who competes in the 5000 m, 10,000 m, half marathon as well as in the cross country running events.

== Personal life ==
Dilek Öztürk was born on 15 February 2001.

== Sport career ==
Öztürk is a member of Fenerbahçe Athletics in Istanbul.

She competed at the 2025 Summer World University Games in Bochum, Germany, and won the bronze medal in the half marathon team event with teammates Nursena Çeto and Ezgi Kaya.
