= Eva Dieterich =

German athlete (born 1999)

Personal information
- Born: 29 March 1999 (age 27)

Sport
- Sport: Athletics
- Event: Long-distance running

Achievements and titles
- Personal bests: 3000 m 8:59.27 (Cork, 2025); 5000 m: 15:30.28 (Braunschweig, 2024); 10,000 m 31:45.18 (Hamburg, 2025); Road; 10 km 31:25 (Leuven, 2025); Half marathon: 1:08:26 (Valencia, 2024)
Medal record
Women's athletics
Representing Germany
European Running Championships
Silver medal – second place	2025 Leuven	10,000 m

Eva Dieterich (born 29 March 1999) is a German long-distance runner. She has won German national titles over 10,000 metres, and over 10 km on the road, and was a silver medalist at the 2025 European Running Championships.

== Early life ==
From Kassel, she won the annual Kassel Mini Marathon three times. However, she contracted mononucleosis shortly before graduating from high school in 2017 and did not run for a significant period of time, but restarted a few years later during the COVID-19 pandemic and later trained again under her former coach, Winfried Aufenanger.

== Career ==
She placed sixth representing Germany over 10,000 m in Tallinn, Estonia at the 2021 European Athletics U23 Championships and tenth in the women's U23 race in Dublin, Ireland at the 2021 European Cross Country Championships. She won her first senior national title at the German Road Race Championships in Saarbrücken in October 2022 over 10 km.

She placed second behind Hanna Klein at the Bietigheimer Silvesterlauf over 10.75 km in 35:22. She won the German 10,000 m Championships on Wassenberg in May 2024. She competed at the 2024 European Athletics Championships in Rome, Italy in June 2024 in the women's 10,000 metres.

She won the silver medal over 10 km on the road, and was a silver medalist at the 2025 European Running Championships behind Nadia Battocletti in Belgium in April 2025, in 31:25, taking 23 seconds off her previous best. She placed fourth in May 2025 at the European 10,000 m Cup in France. In September 2025, she competed over 10,000 metres at the 2025 World Championships in Tokyo, Japan. She was selected for the 2025 European Cross Country Championships in Portugal in December 2025.

In August 2026, she competed at the 2026 European Athletics Championships in Birmingham, England, in the 10,000 metres.

== Personal life ==
She studied for a law degree at Eberhard Karls University of Tübingen. She is a musician and has played in an orchestra, playing violin and piano.
