= Nursena Çeto =

Turkish long-distance runner (born 2002)

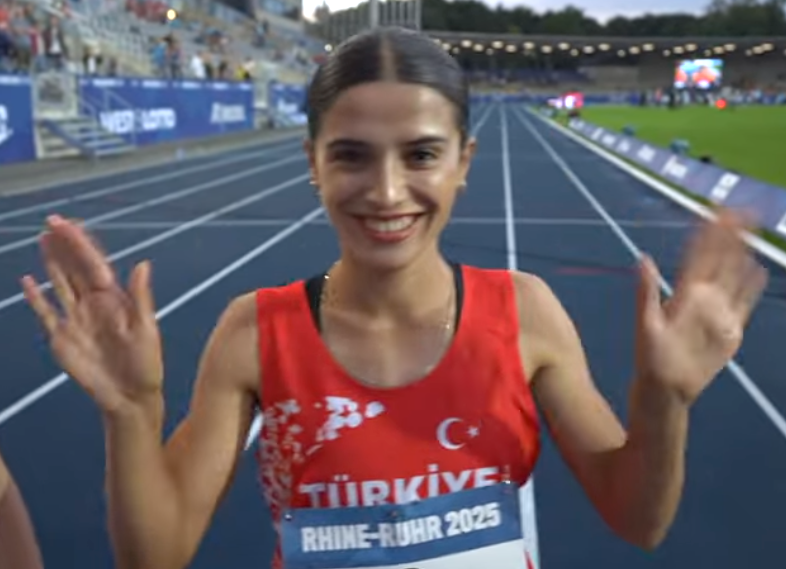
- At the 2025 Summer World University Games

Personal information
- Nationality: Turkish
- Born: 1 May 2002 (age 24) Turkey
- Home town: Turkey
- Education: Atatürk University

Sport
- Country: Turkey
- Sport: Long-distance running
- Events: 5000 m, 10,000 m, half marathon, cross country running
Medal record
Women's Athletics
Representing Turkey
European Cross Country Championships
Silver medal – second place	2024 Antalya	U23 Team
FISU World University Games
Bronze medal – third place	2025 Bochum	Half marathon Team

Nursena Çeto (born 1 May 2002) is a Turkish female long-distance runner, who competes in the 5000 m, 10,000 m, half marathon as well as in the cross country running events.

== Personal life ==
Nursena Çeto was born on 1 May 2002.

== Sport career ==
Çeto took the silver meadl in the U23 women's team event with Pelinsu Şahin, Esmanur Yılmaz, Sıla Bayır, Urkuş Işık and Merve Karakaya at the 2024 European Cross Country Championships in Antalya, Turkey.

She competed at the 2025 Summer World University Games in Bochum, Germany, and won the bronze medal in the half marathon team event with teammates Dilek Öztürk and Ezgi Kaya.
