= Lisa Rooms =

Belgian athlete (born 1996)

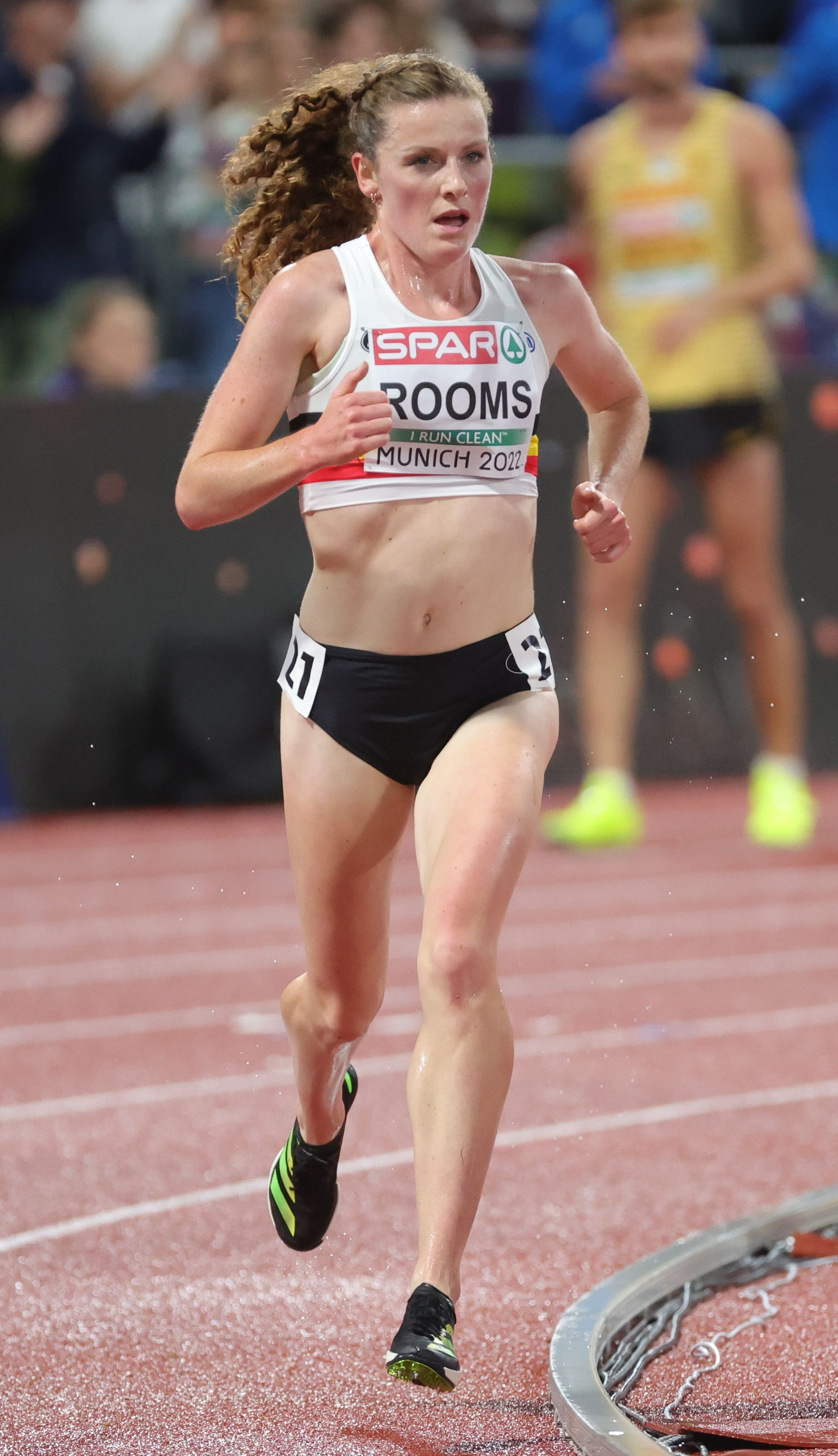

Personal information
- Nationality: Belgian
- Born: 17 June 1996 (age 30)

Sport
- Sport: Athletics
- Event: Long distance running

Achievements and titles
- Personal bests: 1500m: 4:14.03 (Oordegem, 2023); 3000m: 8:47.98 (Metz, 2024); 5000m: 15:26.27 (Walnut, 2023); 10,000m 32:10.22 (Birmingham, 2026); 10km: 32:24 (Rotterdam (2023)
Medal record
Representing Belgium
European Cross Country Championships
Gold medal – first place	2025 Lagoa	Team
Bronze medal – third place	2023 Brussels	Team
Bronze medal – third place	2024 Antalya	Team

Lisa Rooms (born 17 June 1996) is a Belgian long-distance runner. She is a multiple-time Belgian national champion and a Belgian record holder.

== Biography ==
A member of AV Lokeren, in 2019, she became Belgian champion for the first time, over 5000 metres in Brussels.

In 2022 she became the Belgian champion over 5000 metres. That year, she came 15th over 5000m at the 2022 European Athletics Championships in Munich in a time of 15:50.59. At the end of 2022, she changed her coach to Grete Koens after spending eight years with Tim Moriau.

In 2023, she finished in tenth place over 5000m in the at the 2023 European Athletics Team Championships in Chorzów, in a time of 15:44.24. She became the Belgian champion over 5000 metres, 10,000 metres, and the 10 km road race in 2023. She ran a 10 km personal best on the road in Rotterdam in October 2023.

Rooms finished sixth overall and was a bronze medalist in the team event at the 2023 European Cross Country Championships. It was the first time the Belgian women's team had ever been on the podium at the event.

In February 2024, she set a new Belgian national record in the 3000 metres indoors in Metz. She competed in the 5000 metres at the 2024 Summer Olympics in Paris in August 2024. And in December 2024, she and the Belgium team repeated their result from the previous year on home soil in Brussels and finished third in the women's team event at the 2024 European Cross Country Championships in Antalya, Turkey.

In April 2025, she was named by Belgium in their team for their home hosted 2025 European Running Championships in April 2025. In November 2025, she won ahead of Jana Van Lent at the Belgian Cross Country Championships. In December 2025 at the 2025 European Cross Country Championships in Lagoa, Portugal, she finished fifth, just behind compatriot Jana Van Lent in fourth and just before a third Belgian athlete Chloe Herbiet in seventh, winning the gold for Belgium in the senior women's team event. In January 2026, she placed seventh at the Lotto Cross Cup de Hannut to retain her place at the top of the overall CrossCup standings. In August, she competed at the 2026 European Athletics Championships in Birmingham, England, placing tenth in the 10,000 metres in a personal best time of 32:10.22.
