= European Running Championships =

International running competition

- Status: active
- Genre: sports event
- Frequency: biennial
- Location: various
- Inaugurated: 2025
- Next event: 2027
- Organiser: EAA

Starting in 2025 the European Running Championships lifted the marathon and half marathon from the European (track) Athletics Championships and bundled the road races into a new two-year championship. Elite runners compete for the European titles, but the championships simultaneously double as an ‘open’ championship which any recreational runner can enter as is the case in any big city marathon.

== Editions ==
The inaugural event was held in the host cities of Brussels and Leuven in Belgium.

Edition	Year	Host city	Host country	Date	Events	Nations	Athletes	Top of the medal table
1	2025	Brussels-Leuven	Belgium	12–13 April	6	45	323	France
2	2027	Belgrade	Serbia	17–18 April				
3	2029	Utrecht	Netherlands					

== See also ==
- European Athletics Indoor Championships
- International Athletics Championships and Games
- List of European Athletics Championships medalists (men)
- List of European Athletics Championships medalists (women)
- List of European records in athletics
- List of stripped European Athletics Championships medals
- World Para Athletics European Championships
