= Pacé, Ille-et-Vilaine =

Pacé Paczaé (Gallo) Pazieg (Breton)
- Commune
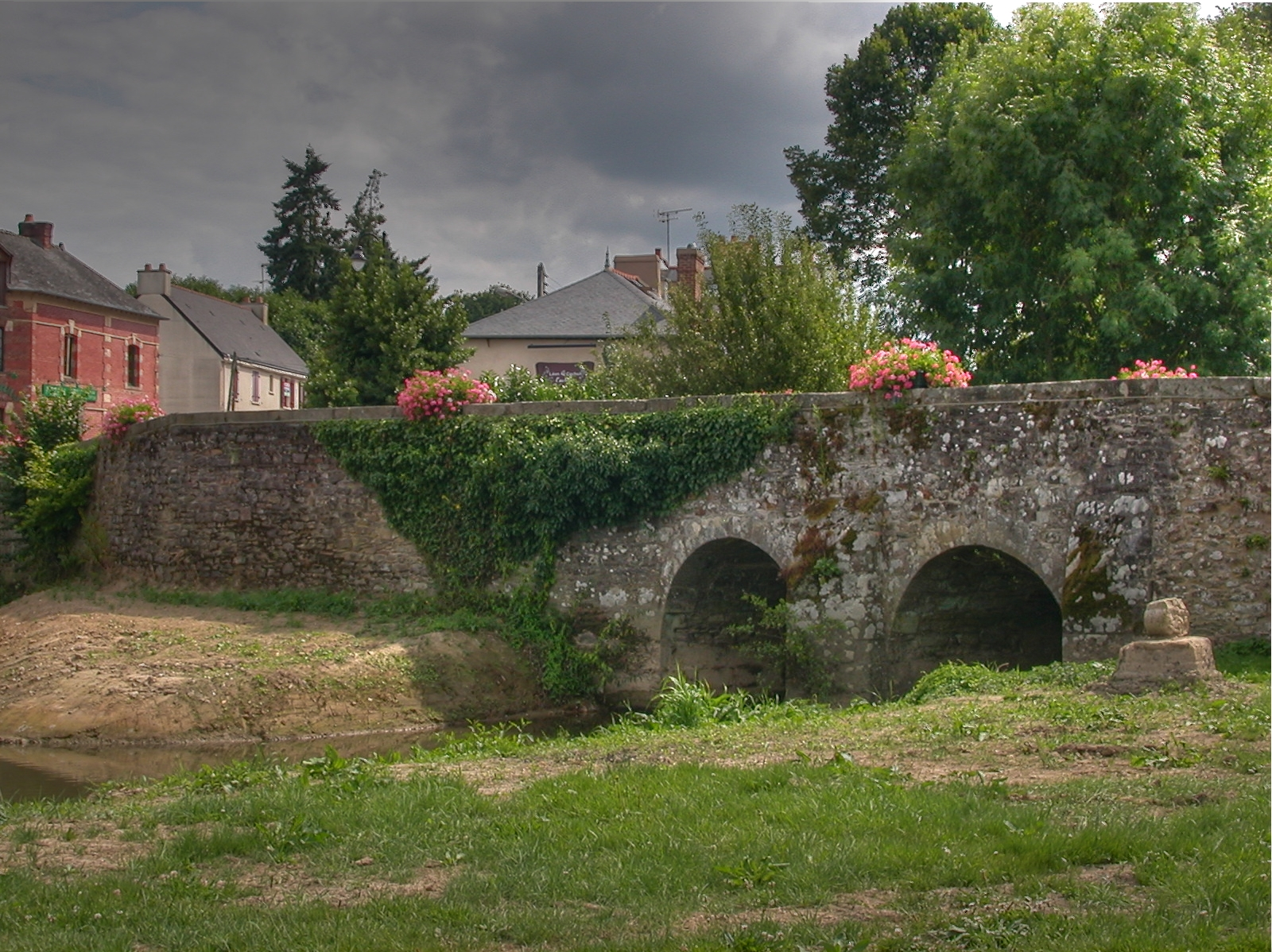
- Bridge over the Flume River

- Coat of arms
- Location of Pacé
- Location within France Location within Brittany
- Coordinates: 48°08′52″N 1°46′26″W
- Country: France
- Region: Brittany
- Department: Ille-et-Vilaine
- Arrondissement: Rennes
- Canton: Rennes-6
- Intercommunality: Rennes Métropole

Government
  - Mayor (2020–2026): Hervé Depouez
- Area^{1}: 35.03 km^{2} (13.53 sq mi)
- Highest elevation: 91 m (299 ft)
- Lowest elevation: 27 m (89 ft)
- Population (2023): 11,703
  - Density: 334.1/km^{2} (865.3/sq mi)
- Time zone: UTC+01:00 (CET)
  - Summer (DST): UTC+02:00 (CEST)
- INSEE/Postal code: 35210 /35740
- ^{1} French Land Register data, which excludes lakes, ponds, glaciers > 1 km^{2} (0.386 sq mi or 247 acres) and river estuaries.

Pacé (French pronunciation: [pase]; Breton: Pazieg; Gallo: Paczaé) is a commune in the Ille-et-Vilaine department of Brittany in northwestern France.

== Geography ==
Pacé is on the banks of the River Flûme, a tributary of the River Vilaine. Neighbouring municipalities include Gévezé to the north, La Mézière to the north-east, with La Chapelle-des-Fougeretz and Montgermont in the east. The capital of Brittany, Rennes lies to the south-east of Pacé.

The little town is positioned along the main road linking the coastal city of Saint-Brieuc with Rennes. The road has recently (2013) been upgraded, which has significantly improved access.

== Population ==
Inhabitants of Pacé are called in French Pacéens and Pacéennes .

Historical population
Year	Pop.	±% p.a.
1968	2,335	—
1975	3,669	+6.67%
1982	4,943	+4.35%
1990	5,548	+1.45%
1999	7,885	+3.98%
2007	8,651	+1.17%
2012	10,818	+4.57%
2017	11,739	+1.65%
2023	11,703	−0.05%
Source: INSEE

== See also ==
- Communes of the Ille-et-Vilaine department
