= 2023 European Cross Country Championships =

- Organisers: EAA
- Edition: 29th
- Date: 10 December
- Host city: Brussels, Belgium
- Venue: Laeken Park
- Events: 7
- Distances: ~10 km – Men; ~8 km – Women; ~8 km – U23 men ~6 km – U23 women ~6 km – U20 men ~4 km – U20 women ~6 km – Mixed relay
- Official website: EAA; Golazo Sports

The 2023 European Cross Country Championships was the 29th edition of the cross country running competition for European athletes. It was held on 10 December 2023 in Laeken Park in Brussels, Belgium.

Belgium staged the European Cross Country Championships for the third time after previous editions in Charleroi in 1996 and Brussels in 2008.

== Medal table ==
* Host nation (Belgium)

Rank	Nation	Gold	Silver	Bronze	Total
1	Great Britain (GBR)	7	1	3	11
2	France (FRA)	2	3	1	6
3	Norway (NOR)	1	1	2	4
4	Denmark (DEN)	1	1	0	2
5	Belgium (BEL)*	1	0	2	3
6	Ireland (IRL)	1	0	1	2
7	Germany (GER)	0	2	0	2
7	Netherlands (NED)	0	2	0	2
9	Spain (ESP)	0	1	2	3
10	Finland (FIN)	0	1	1	2
11	Italy (ITA)	0	1	0	1
12	Sweden (SWE)	0	0	1	1
Totals (12 entries)		13	13	13	39

== Medal summary ==
Event	Gold		Silver		Bronze	
Individual
Senior men	Yann Schrub; France	30:17	Magnus Tuv Myhre; Norway	30:20	Robin Hendrix; Belgium	30:22
Senior women	Karoline Bjerkeli Grøvdal; Norway	33:40	Nadia Battocletti; Italy	34:25	Abbie Donnelly; Great Britain	34:42
U23 men	Will Barnicoat; Great Britain	23:42	Valentin Bresc; France	23:42	Matthew Stonier; Great Britain	23:51
U23 women	Megan Keith; Great Britain	25:32	Ilona Mononen; Finland	26:55	Nathalie Blomqvist; Finland	27:06
U20 men	Axel Vang Christensen; Denmark	16:09	Niels Laros; Netherlands	16:10	Nick Griggs; Ireland	16:24
U20 women	Innes FitzGerald; Great Britain	18:19	Sofia Thøgersen; Denmark	18:38	Jade Le Corre; France	18:49
Team
Senior men's team	Belgium (BEL); Robin Hendrix; John Heymans; Isaac Kimeli; Marco Vanderpoorten; Pieter-Jan Hannes; Guillaume Grimard	20 pts (3+6+11)	France (FRA); Yann Schrub; Fabien Palcau; Hugo Hay; Donovan Christien; Bastien Augusto	26 pts (1+10+15)	Norway (NOR); Magnus Tuv Myhre; Henrik Ingebrigtsen; Jacob Boutera; Eivind Øygard; Even Brøndbo Dahl; Fredrik Sandvik	32 pts (2+12+18)
Senior women's team	Great Britain (GBR); Abbie Donnelly; Jessica Warner-Judd; Izzy Fry; Poppy Tank; Amelia Quirk; Niamh Bridson-Hubbard	18 pts (3+5+10)	Spain (ESP); Irene Sánchez-Escribano; Cristina Ruiz; Carolina Robles; Cristina Espejo; Marta García; Marta Pérez	37 pts (8+13+16)	Belgium (BEL); Lisa Rooms; Chloé Herbiet; Juliette Thomas; Victoria Warpy; Imana Truyers; Sofie van Accom	38 pts (6+9+23)
U23 men's team	Great Britain (GBR); Will Barnicoat; Matthew Stonier; James Kingston; Tomer Tarragano; Henry McLuckie; Rory Leonard	25 pts (1+3+21)	France (FRA); Valentin Bresc; Téo Rubens Banini; Flavien Szot; Luc Le Baron; Titouan Le Grix	34 pts (2+15+17)	Norway (NOR); Moa Abounnachat Bollerød; Vebjørn Hovdejord; Ibrahim Buras; Kristoffer Sagli	42 pts (4+13+25)
U23 women's team	Great Britain (GBR); Megan Keith; Alexandra Millard; Eloise Walker; Tia Wilson; Lynn McKenna; Olivia Mason	27 pts (1+11+15)	Germany (GER); Lisa Merkel; Anneke Vortmeier; Mia Jurenka; Jessica Keller	50 pts (14+16+20)	Spain (ESP); Angela Viciosa; Maria Forero; María González; Laura Domene; Mireya Arnedillo; Marta Serrano	50 pts (4+6+40)
U20 men's team	Ireland (IRL); Nick Griggs; Niall Murphy; Jonas Stafford; Seamus Robinson; Shane Brosnan; Harry Colbert	22 pts (3+9+10)	Great Britain (GBR); Sam Mills; Henry Dover; Rowan Miell-Ingram; Andrew McGill; Sam Hodgson; Louis Small	24 pts (5+6+13)	Spain (ESP); Rubén Leonardo; Unai Naranjo; Aleix Vives; Mesfin Escamilla; Sergio Del Barrio; Ronaldo Olivo	43 pts (8+15+20)
U20 women's team	Great Britain (GBR); Innes FitzGerald; Jess Bailey; Lizzie Wellsted; Katie Pye; Moli Lyons; Zoe Hunter	22 pts (1+8+13)	Germany (GER); Kira Weis; Franziska Drexler; Emily Junginger; Carolina Schäfer; Carolin Hinrichs	34 pts (4+9+21)	Sweden (SWE); Elsa Sundqvist; Ebba Broms; Tilda Månsson; Towa Nilsson; Hannah Kinane; Majken Söderlund Larsson	37 pts (5+14+18)
Relay
Mixed relay	France (FRA); Bérénice Cleyet-Merle; Antoine Senard; Sarah Madeleine; Alexis Miellet	19:44	Netherlands (NED); Kevin Viezee; Jetske van Kampen; Maureen Koster; Bram Anderiessen	19:46	Great Britain (GBR); Joshua Lay; Bethan Morley; Adam Fogg; Khahisa Mhlanga	19:48

- Note: Athletes in italics did not score for the team result.

== Results ==
=== Senior men ===
Individual race
Rank	Athlete	Country	Time (m:s)
1st place, gold medalist(s)	Yann Schrub	France	30:17
2nd place, silver medalist(s)	Magnus Tuv Myhre	Norway	30:20
3rd place, bronze medalist(s)	Robin Hendrix	Belgium	30:22
4	Hugo Milner	Great Britain	30:27
5	Tadesse Getahon	Israel	30:33
6	John Heymans	Belgium	30:34
7	Abdessamad Oukhelfen	Spain	30:40
8	Cormac Dalton	Ireland	30:40
9	Jamal Abdelmaji Eisa Mohammed	ART	30:43
10	Fabien Palcau	France	30:46
11	Isaac Kimeli	Belgium	30:46
12	Henrik Ingebrigtsen	Norway	30:46
13	Yemaneberhan Crippa	Italy	30:47
14	Davor Aaron Bienenfeld	Germany	30:48
15	Hugo Hay	France	30:48
16	Baldvin Magnússon	Iceland	30:48
17	Keelan Kilrehill	Ireland	30:52
18	Jacob Boutera	Norway	30:54
19	Oliver Löfqvist	Sweden	30:56
20	Hugh Armstrong	Ireland	30:56
21	Eivind Øygard	Norway	30:58
22	Brian Fay	Ireland	30:58
23	Calum Johnson	Great Britain	30:59
24	Ouassim Oumaiz	Spain	31:00
25	Marco Vanderpoorten	Belgium	31:01
26	Fernando Carro	Spain	31:04
27	Zakariya Mahamed	Great Britain	31:06
28	André Pereira	Portugal	31:15
29	Luca Alfieri	Italy	31:15
30	Jáchym Kovář	Czech Republic	31:20
31	Pieter-Jan Hannes	Belgium	31:23
32	Even Brøndbo Dahl	Norway	31:23
33	Fredrik Sandvik	Norway	31:25
34	Miguel Moreira	Portugal	31:30
35	Guillaume Grimard	Belgium	31:30
36	Nick Jäger	Germany	31:30
37	Kevin Mulcaire	Ireland	31:30
38	Angus McMillan	United Kingdom	31:31
39	Maximilian Thorwirth	Germany	31:31
40	Donovan Christien	France	31:37
41	Ivo Balabanov	Bulgaria	31:38
42	Andreas Vojta	Austria	31:39
43	Aarón Las Heras	Spain	31:46
44	Alfie Manthorpe	United Kingdom	31:47
45	Emil Danielsson	Sweden	31:47
46	Leo Magnusson	Sweden	31:47
47	Sergio Paniagua	Spain	31:51
48	Ole Hesselbjerg	Denmark	31:53
49	Iliass Aouani	Italy	31:58
50	Pasquale Selvarolo	Italy	32:02
51	Fearghal Curtin	Ireland	32:07
52	Bastien Augusto	France	32:09
53	Mikkel Dahl-Jessen	Denmark	32:09
54	Artūrs Niklāvs Medveds	Latvia	32:10
55	Dereje Chekole	Israel	32:11
56	Mohammadreza Abootorabi	Sweden	32:12
57	Alexandre Figueiredo	Portugal	32:23
58	João Pereira	Portugal	32:28
59	Callum Elson	United Kingdom	32:28
60	Nassim Hassaous	Spain	32:30
61	Yitayew Abuhay	Israel	32:33
62	Dmytro Siruk	Ukraine	32:42
63	Filmon Tesfu	Netherlands	32:49
64	Ersin Tekal	Turkey	33:01
65	Peter Ďurec	Slovakia	33:03
66	Kaur Kivistik	Estonia	33:07
67	Nahuel Carabaña	Andorra	33:12
68	Italo Quazzola	Italy	33:13
69	Filmon Teklebrhan-Berhe	Germany	33:40
70	Giedrius Valinčius	Lithuania	33:40
71	Habtom Amaniel Soquar	ART	33:51
72	Luke Micallef	Malta	34:12
73	Ramazan Baştuğ	Turkey	34:15
74	Yunus Emre Akkuş	Turkey	34:21
75	Bukayawe Malede	Israel	34:22
76	Yonas Kinde	Luxembourg	34:38
77	Ahmet Alkanoğlu	Turkey	34:45
78	Marios Anagnostou	Greece	34:47
79	Robertas Vališauskas	Lithuania	35:04
80	Shaun Galea	Malta	35:55
81	Charlton Debono	Malta	36:18
82	Arnold Rogers	Gibraltar	36:35
83	Nicolas D'Angelo	Monaco	NT
84	Philip Macedo	Gibraltar	NT
85	Leon Gordon	Gibraltar	NT
86	Maurice Turnock	Gibraltar	NT
87	Robert Matto	Gibraltar	NT
88	Ilir Këllezi	Albania	NT
	Duarte Gomes	Portugal	DNF
	Yassin Bouih	Italy	DNF

Team race
Rank	Team	Points
1st place, gold medalist(s)	Belgium; Robin Hendrix; John Heymans; Isaac Kimeli; Marco Vanderpoorten; Pieter-Jan Hannes; Guillaume Grimard	20 pts (3+6+11)
2nd place, silver medalist(s)	France; Yann Schrub; Fabien Palcau; Hugo Hay; Donovan Christien; Bastien Augusto	26 pts (1+10+15)
3rd place, bronze medalist(s)	Norway; Magnus Tuv Myhre; Henrik Ingebrigtsen; Jacob Boutera; Eivind Øygard; Even Brøndbo Dahl; Fredrik Sandvik	32 pts (2+12+18)
4	Ireland; Cormac Dalton; Keelan Kilrehill; Hugh Armstrong; Brian Fay; Kevin Mulcaire; Fearghal Curtin	45 pts (8+17+20)
5	United Kingdom; Hugo Milner; Calum Johnson; Zakariya Mahamed; Angus McMillan; Alfie Manthorpe; Callum Elson	54 pts (4+23+27)
6	Spain; Abdessamad Oukhelfen; Ouassim Oumaiz; Fernando Carro; Aarón Las Heras; Sergio Paniagua; Nassim Hassaous	57 pts (7+24+26)
7	Germany; Davor Aaron Bienenfeld; Nick Jäger; Maximilian Thorwirth; Filmon Teklebrhan-Berhe	89 pts (14+36+39)
8	Italy; Yemaneberhan Crippa; Luca Alfieri; Iliass Aouani; Pasquale Selvarolo; Italo Quazzola; Yassin Bouih	91 pts (13+29+49)
9	Sweden; Oliver Löfqvist; Emil Danielsson; Leo Magnusson; Mohammadreza Abootorabi	110 pts (19+45+46)
10	Portugal; André Pereira; Miguel Moreira; Alexandre Figueiredo; João Pereira; Duarte Gomes	119 pts (28+34+57)
11	Israel; Tadesse Getahon; Dereje Chekole; Yitayew Abuhay; Bukayawe Malede	121 pts (5+55+61)
12	Turkey; Ersin Tekal; Ramazan Baştuğ; Yunus Emre Akkuş; Ahmet Alkanoğlu	211 pts (64+73+74)
13	Malta; Luke Micallef; Shaun Galea; Charlton Debono	233 pts (72+80+81)
	Gibraltar; Arnold Rogers; Philip Macedo; Leon Gordon; Maurice Turnock; Robert Matto	NM

=== Senior women ===
Individual race
Rank	Athlete	Country	Time (m:s)
1st place, gold medalist(s)	Karoline Bjerkeli Grøvdal	Norway	33:40
2nd place, silver medalist(s)	Nadia Battocletti	Italy	34:25
3rd place, bronze medalist(s)	Abbie Donnelly	Great Britain	34:42
4	Fionnuala McCormack	Ireland	35:00
5	Jessica Warner-Judd	Great Britain	35:20
6	Lisa Rooms	Belgium	35:29
7	Cecile Jarousseau	France	35:31
8	Irene Sánchez-Escribano	Spain	35:32
9	Chloé Herbiet	Belgium	35:34
10	Izzy Fry	Great Britain	35:37
11	Poppy Tank	Great Britain	35:42
12	Marie Bouchard	France	35:42
13	Cristina Ruiz	Spain	36:00
14	Amelia Quirk	Great Britain	36:03
15	Elena Burkard	Germany	36:12
16	Carolina Robles	Spain	36:15
17	Juliane Hvid	Denmark	36:18
18	Maria Sagnes Wågan	Norway	36:22
19	Niamh Bridson-Hubbard	Great Britain	36:27
20	Margaux Sieracki	France	36:31
21	Lisa Tertsch	Germany	36:33
22	Tereza Hrochová	Czech Republic	36:37
23	Juliette Thomas	Belgium	36:41
24	Eva Dieterich	Germany	36:44
25	Valentina Gemetto	Italy	36:48
26	Merel van der Marel	Netherlands	36:49
27	Sibylle Häring	Switzerland	36:51
28	Anna Arnaudo	Italy	36:52
29	Célia Tabet	France	36:55
30	Fionnuala Ross	Ireland	36:56
31	Bahar Atalay	Turkey	36:56
32	Victoria Warpy	Belgium	36:58
33	Rebecca Lonedo	Italy	37:05
34	Fiona Everard	Ireland	37:06
35	Cristina Espejo	Spain	37:08
36	Marta García	Spain	37:08
37	Veerle Bakker	Netherlands	37:09
38	Mélanie Allier	France	37:10
39	Mary Mulhare	Ireland	37:10
40	Sabina Jarząbek	Poland	37:10
41	Ine Bakken	Norway	37:11
42	Susanna Saapunki	Finland	37:12
43	Imana Truyers	Belgium	37:14
44	Eilish Flanagan	Ireland	37:34
45	Militsa Mircheva	Bulgaria	37:36
46	Marta Pérez	Spain	37:37
47	Laura Maasik	Estonia	37:40
48	Sofie van Accom	Belgium	37:44
49	Roisin Flanagan	Ireland	37:47
50	Lilla Böhm	Hungary	38:38
51	Sümeyye Erol	Turkey	38:39
52	Devora Avramova	Bulgaria	39:10
53	Semra Karaslan	Turkey	39:24
54	Lisa Bezzina	Malta	NT
55	Rachel Borg	Malta	NT
	Gabija Galvydytė	Lithuania	DNF
	Sarah Lahti	Sweden	DNF
	Federica Zanne	Italy	DNF
	Elisa Palmero	Italy	DNF

Team race
Rank	Team	Points
1st place, gold medalist(s)	Great Britain; Abbie Donnelly; Jessica Warner-Judd; Izzy Fry; Poppy Tank; Amelia Quirk; Niamh Bridson-Hubbard	18 pts (3+5+10)
2nd place, silver medalist(s)	Spain; Irene Sánchez-Escribano; Cristina Ruiz; Carolina Robles; Cristina Espejo; Marta García; Marta Pérez	37 pts (8+13+16)
3rd place, bronze medalist(s)	Belgium; Lisa Rooms; Chloé Herbiet; Juliette Thomas; Victoria Warpy; Imana Truyers; Sofie van Accom	38 pts (6+9+23)
4	France; Cecile Jarousseau; Marie Bouchard; Margaux Sieracki; Célia Tabet; Mélanie Allier	39 pts (7+12+20)
5	Italy; Nadia Battocletti; Valentina Gemetto; Anna Arnaudo; Rebecca Lonedo; Federica Zanne; Elisa Palmero	55 pts (2+25+28)
6	Germany; Elena Burkard; Lisa Tertsch; Eva Dieterich	60 pts (15+21+24)
7	Norway; Karoline Bjerkeli Grøvdal; Maria Sagnes Wågan ne Bakken	60 pts (1+18+41)
8	Ireland; Fionnuala McCormack; Fionnuala Ross; Fiona Everard; Mary Mulhare; Eilish Flanagan; Roisin Flanagan	68 pts (4+30+34)
9	Turkey; Bahar Atalay; Sümeyye Erol; Semra Karaslan	135 pts (31+51+53)

=== U23 men ===
Individual race
Rank	Athlete	Country	Time (m:s)
1st place, gold medalist(s)	Will Barnicoat	Great Britain	23:42
2nd place, silver medalist(s)	Valentin Bresc	France	23:42
3rd place, bronze medalist(s)	Matthew Stonier	Great Britain	23:51
4	Moa Abounnachat Bollerød	Norway	23:56
5	Miguel Baidal	Spain	23:56
6	Joel Ibler Lillesø	Denmark	23:57
7	Adisu Guadia	Israel	24:05
8	Jonathan Hofer	Switzerland	24:05
9	Mustafe Muuse	Finland	24:15
10	Yorick van de Kerkhove	Belgium	24:17
11	Santtu Heikkinen	Finland	24:18
12	Jesse Fokkenrood	Netherlands	24:20
13	Vebjørn Hovdejord	Norway	24:21
14	Rúben Amaral	Portugal	24:23
15	Téo Rubens Banini	France	24:23
16	Felix Friedrich	Germany	24:25
17	Flavien Szot	France	24:26
18	Luc Le Baron	France	24:26
19	Mario Priego	Spain	24:27
20	Robbe Theeuwes	Belgium	24:27
21	James Kingston	Great Britain	24:28
22	Alejandro Quijada	Spain	24:30
23	Alain Cavagna	Italy	24:33
24	Roman Freitag	Germany	24:34
25	Ibrahim Buras	Norway	24:35
26	Nicolò Bedini	Italy	24:41
27	Tomer Tarragano	Great Britain	24:46
28	Oisin Spillane	Ireland	24:46
29	Dean Casey	Ireland	24:46
30	Jaime Migallon	Spain	24:49
31	Etson Barros	Portugal	24:49
32	João Pais	Portugal	24:50
33	Antoine Reul	Belgium	24:53
34	Aaron Decloedt	Belgium	24:55
35	Benjamin Dern	Germany	24:59
36	Mateusz Gos	Poland	25:00
37	Adam Maijó	Spain	25:02
38	Maciej Megier	Poland	25:05
39	Andrii Atamaniuk	Ukraine	25:05
40	Maxim Wyss	Switzerland	25:05
41	Callum Morgan	Ireland	25:09
42	Theodor Schucht	Germany	25:10
43	Nikolas Loss	Italy	25:12
44	Derebe Ayele	Israel	25:13
45	Noah Konteh	Belgium	25:14
46	Miguel Angel Martínez	Spain	25:14
47	Adam Ochnik	Poland	25:15
48	Titouan Le Grix	France	25:18
49	Luciano Spettoli	Italy	25:24
50	Léo Lädermann	Switzerland	25:25
51	Abdel Laadjel	Ireland	25:25
52	Wiktor Antosz	Poland	25:27
53	Jeppe Risvig	Denmark	25:27
54	Michael Morgan	Ireland	25:39
55	Gil Weicherding	Luxembourg	25:41
56	Ateka Demisie	Israel	25:41
57	Henry McLuckie	United Kingdom	25:44
58	Gabriel Matos	Switzerland	25:44
59	Niko Putkinen	Finland	25:45
60	Ayetullah Aslanhan	Turkey	25:47
61	Joseph Lavery	Ireland	25:55
62	Francesco Da Vià	Italy	25:56
63	Ömer Amaçtan	Turkey	26:06
64	Marcel Tobler	Austria	26:08
65	Andrea Palumbo	Italy	26:08
66	Michal Staník	Slovakia	26:17
67	Daniel Marszk	Poland	26:23
68	Nikita Bogdanovs	Latvia	26:32
69	Nestoras Kolios	Greece	26:36
70	Panagiotis-Orfeas Giannatis	Greece	26:45
71	Taner Tunçtan	Turkey	26:45
72	Ignas Dumbliauskas	Lithuania	26:58
73	David Borg	Malta	27:14
74	Orfeas Ioannou	Greece	27:45
75	Oliver Annus	Estonia	28:28
76	İsmail Taşyürek	Turkey	28:30
	Rory Leonard	United Kingdom	DNF
	Pedro Amaro	Portugal	DNF
	Kristoffer Sagli	Norway	DNF

Team race
Rank	Team	Points
1st place, gold medalist(s)	Great Britain; Will Barnicoat; Matthew Stonier; James Kingston; Tomer Tarragano; Henry McLuckie; Rory Leonard	25 pts (1+3+21)
2nd place, silver medalist(s)	France; Valentin Bresc; Téo Rubens Banini; Flavien Szot; Luc Le Baron; Titouan Le Grix	34 pts (2+15+17)
3rd place, bronze medalist(s)	Norway; Moa Abounnachat Bollerød; Vebjørn Hovdejord; Ibrahim Buras; Kristoffer Sagli	42 pts (4+13+25)
4	Spain; Miguel Baidal; Mario Priego; Alejandro Quijada; Jaime Migallon; Adam Maijo; Miguel Ángel Martínez	46 pts (5+19+22)
5	Belgium; Yorick van de Kerkhove; Robbe Theeuwes; Antoine Reul; Aaron Decloedt; Noah Konteh	63 pts (10+20+33)
6	Germany; Felix Friedrich; Roman Freitag; Benjamin Dern; Theodor Schucht	75 pts (16+24+35)
7	Portugal; Rúben Amaral; Etson Barros; João Pais; Pedro Amaro	77 pts (14+31+32)
8	Finland; Mustafe Muuse; Santtu Heikkinen; Niko Putkinen	79 pts (9+11+59)
9	Italy; Alain Cavagna; Nicolò Bedini; Nikolas Loss; Luciano Spettoli; Francesco Da Vià; Andrea Palumbo	92 pts (23+26+43)
10	Ireland; Oisin Spillane; Dean Casey; Callum Morgan; Abdel Laadjel; Michael Morgan; Joseph Lavery	98 pts (28+29+41)
11	Switzerland; Jonathan Hofer; Maxim Wyss; Léo Lädermann; Gabriel Matos	98 pts (8+40+50)
12	Israel; Adisu Guadia; Derebe Ayele; Ateka Demisie	107 pts (7+44+56)
13	Poland; Mateusz Gos; Maciej Megier; Adam Ochnik; Wiktor Antosz; Daniel Marszk	121 pts (36+38+47)
14	Turkey; Ayetullah Aslanhan; Ömer Amaçtan; Taner Tunçtan; İsmail Taşyürek	194 pts (60+63+71)
15	Greece; Nestoras Kolios; Panagiotis-Orfeas Giannatis; Orfeas Ioannou	213 pts (69+70+74)

=== U23 women ===
Individual race
Rank	Athlete	Country	Time (m:s)
1st place, gold medalist(s)	Megan Keith	Great Britain	25:32
2nd place, silver medalist(s)	Ilona Mononen	Finland	26:55
3rd place, bronze medalist(s)	Nathalie Blomqvist	Finland	27:06
4	Angela Viciosa	Spain	27:08
5	Greta Karinauskaitė	Lithuania	27:13
6	Maria Forero	Spain	27:21
7	Jana van Lent	Belgium	27:21
8	Danielle Donegan	Ireland	27:24
9	Emmy van den Berg	Netherlands	27:29
10	Yasna Petrova	Bulgaria	27:34
11	Alexandra Millard	Great Britain	27:37
12	Ina Halle Haugen	Norway	27:38
13	Amina Maatoug	Netherlands	27:40
14	Lisa Merkel	Germany	27:57
15	Eloise Walker	Great Britain	28:03
16	Anneke Vortmeier	Germany	28:06
17	Manon Cumy	France	28:10
18	Olimpia Breza	Poland	28:15
19	Shirley Lang	Switzerland	28:17
20	Mia Jurenka	Germany	28:19
21	Camille Laurent	France	28:20
22	Agnese Carcano	Italy	28:24
23	Heloise Laigle	France	28:27
24	Pelinsu Şahin	Turkey	28:31
25	Karoline Husted	Denmark	28:32
26	Mari Ruud	Norway	28:38
27	Uliana Rachynska	Ukraine	28:42
28	Sara Nestola	Italy	28:42
29	Thaïs Paris	France	28:43
30	Aurora Bado	Italy	28:44
31	Dafni-Eftychia-Tereza Lavasa	Greece	28:47
32	Julie Voet	Belgium	28:48
33	Beata Niemyjska	Poland	28:53
34	Tia Wilson	Great Britain	28:58
35	Lynn McKenna	Great Britain	28:59
36	Romane Wolhauser	Switzerland	29:04
37	Roxane Cleppe	Belgium	29:04
38	Inès Hamoudi	France	29:06
39	Julia Koralewska	Poland	29:08
40	María González	Spain	29:11
41	Sarah Peerik	Netherlands	29:12
42	Ilaria Bruno	Italy	29:15
43	Mădălina-Elena Sîrbu	Romania	29:16
44	Olivia Mason	Great Britain	29:18
45	Laura Domene	Spain	29:25
46	Marie Bilo	Belgium	29:31
47	Anika Thompson	Ireland	29:32
48	Inês Borba	Portugal	29:33
49	Sara Busic	Norway	29:34
50	Nursena Çeto	Turkey	29:35
51	Femke Rosbergen	Netherlands	29:41
52	Inci Kalkan	Turkey	29:41
53	Cordula Lassacher	Austria	29:41
54	Mireya Arnedillo	Spain	29:41
55	Vera Sjöberg	Sweden	29:45
56	Anna Málková	Czech Republic	29:49
57	Jessica Keller	Germany	29:50
58	Charlotte Van Laethem	Belgium	29:52
59	Emily Schoellkopf	Switzerland	30:21
60	Vivien Bonzi	Italy	30:24
61	Nuša Mali	Slovenia	30:26
62	Marta Serrano	Spain	30:33
63	Ava O'Connor	Ireland	30:40
64	Greta Settino	Italy	30:41
65	Lotte Seiler	Austria	30:54
66	Aoife Coffey	Ireland	30:56
67	Ivanna Potapchuk	Ukraine	31:01
68	Ezgi Kaya	Turkey	31:04
69	Emma D'Haene	Belgium	31:12
70	Aoife O'Cuill	Ireland	31:15
71	Małgorzata Karpiuk	Poland	31:22
72	Eimear Maher	Ireland	31:40
73	Daryna Omarova	Ukraine	32:19
74	Evelīna Krista Sitnika	Latvia	32:39

Team race
Rank	Team	Points
1st place, gold medalist(s)	Great Britain; Megan Keith; Alexandra Millard; Eloise Walker; Tia Wilson; Lynn McKenna; Olivia Mason	27 pts (1+11+15)
2nd place, silver medalist(s)	Germany; Lisa Merkel; Anneke Vortmeier; Mia Jurenka; Jessica Keller	50 pts (14+16+20)
3rd place, bronze medalist(s)	Spain; Angela Viciosa; Maria Forero; María González; Laura Domene; Mireya Arnedillo; Marta Serrano	50 pts (4+6+40)
4	France; Manon Cumy; Camille Laurent; Heloise Langle; Thaïs Paris; Inès Hamoudi	61 pts (17+21+23)
5	Netherlands; Emmy van den Berg; Amina Maatoug; Sarah Peerik; Femke Rosbergen	63 pts (9+13+41)
6	Belgium; Jana van Lent; Julie Voet; Roxane Cleppe; Marie Bilo; Charlotte Van Laethem; Emma D'Haene	76 pts (7+32+37)
7	Italy; Agnese Carcano; Sara Nestola; Aurora Bado; Ilaria Bruno; Vivien Bonzi; Greta Settino	80 pts (22+28+30)
8	Norway; Ina Halle Haugen; Mari Ruud; Sara Busic	87 pts (12+26+49)
9	Poland; Olimpia Breza; Beata Niemyjska; Julia Koralewska; Małgorzata Karpiuk	90 pts (18+33+39)
10	Switzerland; Shirley Lang; Romane Wolhauser; Emily Schoellkopf	114 pts (19+36+59)
11	Ireland; Danielle Donegan; Anika Thompson; Ava O'Connor; Aoife Coffey; Aoife O'Cuill; Eimear Maher	118 pts (8+47+63)
12	Turkey; Pelinsu Şahin; Nursena Çeto; Inci Kalkan; Ezgi Kaya	126 pts (24+50+52)
13	Ukraine; Uliana Rachynska; Ivanna Potapchuk; Daryna Omarova	167 pts (27+67+73)

=== U20 men ===
Individual race
Rank	Athlete	Country	Time (m:s)
1st place, gold medalist(s)	Axel Vang Christensen	Denmark	16:09
2nd place, silver medalist(s)	Niels Laros	Netherlands	16:10
3rd place, bronze medalist(s)	Nicholas Griggs	Ireland	16:24
4	Karl Ottfalk	Sweden	16:39
5	Sam Mills	United Kingdom	16:43
6	Henry Dover	United Kingdom	16:45
7	Simon Jeukenne	Belgium	16:47
8	Rubén Leonardo	Spain	16:48
9	Niall Murphy	Ireland	16:49
10	Jonas Stafford	Ireland	16:50
11	Aurélien Radja	France	16:51
12	Francesco Ropelato	Italy	16:52
13	Rowan Miell-Ingram	United Kingdom	16:54
14	Matthieu Bührer	Switzerland	16:54
15	Unai Naranjo	Spain	16:55
16	Gaston Rohmer	France	16:55
17	Lukas Ehrle	Germany	16:56
18	Gábor Karsai	Hungary	16:58
19	Juan Zijderlaan	Netherlands	16:59
20	Aleix Vives	Spain	17:00
21	Mathis Lievens	Belgium	17:02
22	Andrew McGill	United Kingdom	17:02
23	Tristan Gevaert	Belgium	17:04
24	Oscar Thebaud	France	17:08
25	Sam Hodgson	United Kingdom	17:09
26	Seamus Robinson	Ireland	17:11
27	Mesfin Escamilla	Spain	17:17
28	Shane Brosnan	Ireland	17:17
29	Louis Small	United Kingdom	17:17
30	Ali Tunç	Turkey	17:18
31	Ishak Dahmani	France	17:21
32	Casper Lievens	Belgium	17:23
33	Vittore Simone Borromini	Italy	17:24
34	Lourenço Rodrigues	Portugal	17:28
35	Youssef Boutayeb	France	17:29
36	Nino Freitag	Switzerland	17:32
37	Sergio Del Barrio	Spain	17:34
38	Régis Thibert	Belgium	17:37
39	Nathan Houwaard	Netherlands	17:38
40	Harry Colbert	Ireland	17:38
41	Elia Triaca	Switzerland	17:39
42	Utku Göler	Turkey	17:41
43	Caner Can Tunçtan	Turkey	17:41
44	Stefano Benzoni	Italy	17:43
45	Mick Wolvekamp	Netherlands	17:44
46	Ronaldo Olivo	Spain	17:45
47	Nicola Baiocchi	Italy	17:46
48	Joakim Bertelsen	Denmark	17:47
49	Lorenzo Pelliciardi	Italy	17:49
50	Andreas Fjeld Halvorsen	Norway	17:50
51	Tristan Kaufhold	Germany	17:50
52	Lucian Florin Ștefan	Romania	17:51
53	Aldin Ćatović	Serbia	17:53
54	Mihai-Alin Șavlovschi	Romania	17:59
55	Filip Jančík	Slovakia	18:00
56	Tobias Tent	Germany	18:01
57	Alex Hulka	Slovakia	18:01
58	Ioann Lobles	Netherlands	18:02
59	Aaron Schubert	Germany	18:02
60	Kristers Kudlis	Latvia	18:06
61	Aarno Liebl	Switzerland	18:06
62	Keanu Simasotchi	Switzerland	18:12
63	Daan Lievens	Belgium	18:13
64	Gabriel Farrugia	Malta	18:22
65	Emil Bezecny	Austria	18:25
66	Valentas Mockus	Lithuania	18:27
67	Rui Mineiro	Portugal	18:28
68	Jonas Weschle	Germany	18:29
69	Benjamin Azimi Khanlarkhani	Denmark	18:30
70	Morten Siht	Estonia	18:32
71	Róbert Árvai	Hungary	18:33
72	Roberts Aleksis Glazers	Latvia	18:38
73	Ármin Lesták	Hungary	18:39
74	Victor Tvistholm Jørgensen	Denmark	18:39
75	Nikola Mijailović	Serbia	18:40
76	Jiří Pavel Češka	Czech Republic	18:46
77	August Da Silva Sveen	Norway	18:48
78	Federico Sammartino	Italy	18:49
79	André Nathan Geada Da Silva	Portugal	19:00
80	Ciprian Costin	Romania	19:02
81	Mervan Haykir	Turkey	19:04
82	Veljko Vasiljević	Serbia	19:06
83	Vasyl Nesmiianov	Ukraine	19:06
84	Andrei Dascal	Romania	19:22
85	Dušan Đurđanović	Serbia	19:22
86	Dragoș Luca Pop	Romania	19:25
87	Luka Aljaž Pajek	Slovenia	19:37
88	Jory Teixeira	Luxembourg	19:47
	Ferenc Soma Kovács	Hungary	DNF
	Emmanouil-Georgios Sgouros	Greece	DNF
	Gaspar Klückers	Luxembourg	DNF
	André Barbosa	Portugal	DNF

Team race
Rank	Team	Points
1st place, gold medalist(s)	Ireland; Nicholas Griggs; Niall Murphy; Jonas Stafford; Seamus Robinson; Shane Brosnan; Harry Colbert	22 pts (3+9+10)
2nd place, silver medalist(s)	Great Britain; Sam Mills; Henry Dover; Rowan Miell-Ingram; Andrew McGill; Sam Hodgson; Louis Small	24 pts (5+6+13)
3rd place, bronze medalist(s)	Spain; Rubén Leonardo; Unai Naranjo; Aleix Vives; Mesfin Escamilla; Sergio Del Barrio; Ronaldo Olivo	43 pts (8+15+20)
4	Belgium; Simon Jeukenne; Mathis Lievens; Tristan Gevaert; Casper Lievens; Régis Thibert; Daan Lievens	51 pts (7+21+23)
5	France; Aurélien Radja; Gaston Rohmer; Oscar Thebaud; Ishak Dahmani; Youssef Boutayeb	51 pts (11+16+24)
6	Netherlands; Niels Laros; Juan Zijderlaan; Nathan Houwaard; Mick Wolvekamp; Ioann Lobles	60 pts (2+19+39)
7	Italy; Francesco Ropelato; Vittore Simone Borromini; Stefano Benzoni; Nicola Baiocchi; Lorenzo Pelliciardi; Federico Sammartino	89 pts (12+33+44)
8	Switzerland; Matthieu Bührer; Nino Freitag; Elia Triaca; Aarno Liebl; Keanu Simasotchi	91 pts (14+36+41)
9	Turkey; Ali Tunç; Utku Göler; Caner Can Tunçtan; Mervan Haykir	115 pts (30+42+43)
10	Denmark; Axel Vang Christensen; Joakim Bertelsen; Benjamin Azimi Khanlarkhani; Victor Tvistholm Jørgensen	118 pts (1+48+69)
11	Germany; Lukas Ehrle; Tristan Kaufhold; Tobias Tent; Aaron Schubert; Jonas Weschle	124 pts (17+51+56)
12	Hungary; Gábor Karsai; Róbert Árvai; Ármin Lesták; Ferenc Soma Kovács	162 pts (18+71+73)
13	Portugal; Lourenço Rodrigues; Rui Mineiro; André Nathan Geada Da Silva; André Barbosa	180 pts (34+67+79)
14	Romania; Lucian Florin Ștefan; Mihai-Alin Șavlovschi; Ciprian Costin; Andrei Dascal; Dragoș Luca Pop	186 pts (52+54+80)
15	Serbia; Aldin Ćatović; Nikola Mijailović; Veljko Vasiljević; Dušan Đurđanović	210 pts (53+75+82)

=== U20 women ===
Individual race
Rank	Athlete	Country	Time (m:s)
1st place, gold medalist(s)	Innes FitzGerald	Great Britain	18:19
2nd place, silver medalist(s)	Sofia Thögersen	Denmark	18:38
3rd place, bronze medalist(s)	Jade Le Corre	France	18:49
4	Kira Weis	Germany	18:54
5	Elsa Sundqvist	Sweden	19:10
6	Shirin Kerber	Switzerland	19:30
7	Anna Gardiner	Ireland	19:31
8	Jess Bailey	Great Britain	19:31
9	Franziska Drexler	Germany	19:34
10	Thea Charlotte Knutsen	Norway	19:38
11	Katarzyna Napiorkowska	Poland	19:41
12	Kirsty Maher	Ireland	19:43
13	Lizzie Wellsted	Great Britain	19:47
14	Ebba Broms	Sweden	19:51
15	Lara Costa	Portugal	19:52
16	Dilek Koçak	Turkey	19:53
17	Anna Marie Nordengren Sirevåg	Norway	19:54
18	Tilda Månsson	Sweden	19:54
19	Charlotte Penneman	Belgium	19:56
20	Adèle Gay	France	19:57
21	Emily Junginger	Germany	19:58
22	Hannah Enkels	Belgium	20:01
23	Laly Porentru	France	20:05
24	Clara Entresangle	France	20:05
25	Adele Roatta	Italy	20:06
26	Edibe Yağız	Turkey	20:07
27	Fien Paulussen	Belgium	20:10
28	Katie Pye	Great Britain	20:12
29	Amy Greene	Ireland	20:12
30	Fabienne Müller	Switzerland	20:13
31	Moli Lyons	Great Britain	20:13
32	Zoe Hunter	Great Britain	20:18
33	Carolina Schäfer	Germany	20:19
34	Elena Ribigini	Italy	20:20
35	María Viciosa	Spain	20:21
36	Maria Mihaela Blaga	Romania	20:21
37	Margot Dajoux	France	20:23
38	Carolin Hinrichs	Germany	20:25
39	Gioana Lopizzo	Switzerland	20:26
40	Astrid My Rønde Kristensen	Denmark	20:27
41	Rhune Vanroose	Belgium	20:28
42	Licia Ferrari	Italy	20:32
43	Blanca Batlle	Spain	20:33
44	Towa Nilsson	Sweden	20:34
45	Hannah Kehoe	Ireland	20:34
46	Marte Hovland	Norway	20:35
47	Saima Murić	Serbia	20:36
48	Ambar Tomas	Spain	20:39
49	Lucia Arnoldo	Italy	20:40
50	Nina Villiger	Switzerland	20:42
51	Astrid Van Breedam	Belgium	20:43
52	Malin Hoelsveen	Norway	20:45
53	Merve Karakaya	Turkey	20:46
54	Maebh Richardson	Ireland	20:49
55	Jana Johanová	Czech Republic	20:50
56	Femke D'Hauwers	Belgium	20:51
57	Petra Santos	Portugal	20:54
58	Hannah Kinane	Sweden	20:57
59	Avril Millerick	Ireland	20:57
60	Stela Fernandes	Portugal	21:16
61	Mari Mai Ruus	Estonia	21:25
62	Milica Tomašević	Serbia	21:27
63	Xela Martínez	Spain	21:31
64	Esmanur Yilmaz	Turkey	21:34
65	Ruth Marti	Spain	21:42
66	Margherita Voliani	Italy	21:44
67	Martyna Krawczyńska	Poland	21:54
68	Marwa El Khouya	Spain	21:54
69	Diana Fernandes	Portugal	21:57
70	Bieke Schipperen	Netherlands	21:59
71	Karolina Bliujūtė	Lithuania	22:04
72	Eleonora Višnevskytė	Lithuania	22:08
73	Claudia Ionela Costiuc	Romania	22:10
74	Loti Rotar	Slovenia	22:20
75	Alexandra Maria Hudea	Romania	22:24
76	Mejra Mehmedović	Serbia	22:38
77	Sofiia Hordiichuk	Ukraine	22:54
78	Diana Verdeș	Romania	22:56
79	Iulia Florina Marginean	Romania	23:10
80	Natalija Grujić	Serbia	24:02
	Majken Söderlund Larsson	Sweden	DNF
	Sofia Sidenius	Italy	DNF

Team race
Rank	Team	Points
1st place, gold medalist(s)	Great Britain; Innes FitzGerald; Jess Bailey; Lizzie Wellsted; Katie Pye; Moli Lyons; Zoe Hunter	22 pts (1+8+13)
2nd place, silver medalist(s)	Germany; Kira Weis; Franziska Drexler; Emily Junginger; Carolina Schäfer; Carolin Hinrichs	34 pts (4+9+21)
3rd place, bronze medalist(s)	Sweden; Elsa Sundqvist; Ebba Broms; Tilda Månsson; Towa Nilsson; Hannah Kinane; Majken Söderlund Larsson	37 pts (5+14+18)
4	France; Jade Le Corre; Adèle Gay; Laly Porentru; Clara Entresangle; Margot Dajoux	46 pts (3+20+23)
5	Ireland; Anna Gardiner; Kirsty Maher; Amy Greene; Hannah Kehoe; Maebh Richardson; Avril Millerick	48 pts (7+12+29)
6	Belgium; Charlotte Penneman; Hannah Enkels; Fien Paulussen; Rhune Vanroose; Astrid Van Breedam; Femke D'Hauwers	68 pts (19+22+27)
7	Norway; Thea Charlotte Knutsen; Anna Marie Nordengen Sirevåg; Marte Hovland; Malin Hoelsveen	73 pts (10+17+46)
8	Switzerland; Shirin Kerber; Fabienne Müller; Gioana Lopizzo; Nina Villiger	75 pts (6+30+39)
9	Turkey; Dilek Koçak; Edibe Yağız; Merve Karakaya; Esmanur Yilmaz	95 pts (16+26+53)
10	Italy; Adele Roatta; Elena Ribigini; Licia Ferrari; Lucia Arnoldo; Margherita Voliani; Sofia Sidenius	101 pts (25+34+42)
11	Spain; María Viciosa; Blanca Batlle; Ambar Tomas; Xela Martínez; Ruth Marti; Marwa El Khouya	126 pts (35+43+48)
12	Portugal; Lara Costa; Petra Santos; Stela Fernandes; Diana Fernandes	132 pts (15+57+60)
13	Romania; Maria Mihaela Blaga; Claudia Ionela Costiuc; Alexandra Maria Hudea; Diana Verdeș; Iulia Florina Marginean	184 pts (36+73+75)
14	Serbia; Saima Murić; Milica Tomašević; Mejra Mehmedović; Natalija Grujić	185 pts (47+62+76)

=== Mixed Relay ===
Team race
Rank	Team	Time (m:s)
1st place, gold medalist(s)	France; Bérénice Cleyet-Merle; Antoine Senard; Sarah Madeleine; Alexis Miellet	19:44
2nd place, silver medalist(s)	Netherlands; Kevin Viezee; Jetske van Kampen; Maureen Koster; Bram Anderiessen	19:46
3rd place, bronze medalist(s)	Great Britain; Joshua Lay; Bethan Morley; Adam Fogg; Khahisa Mhlanga	19:48
4	Italy; Gaia Sabbatini; Mohad Abdikadar Sheik Ali; Marta Zenoni; Pietro Arese	20:06
5	Belgium; Ziad Audah; Elise Vanderelst; Charlotte Van Hese; Ruben Verheyden	20:15
6	Hungary; Lili Anna Vindics-Tóth; István Szögi; Viktória Wagner-Gyürkés; István Palkovits	20:24
7	Poland; Filip Rak; Aleksandra Płocińska; Eliza Megger; Kamil Herzyk	20:27
8	Spain; Abderrahman El Khayami; Rosalía Tárraga; Naima Ait Alibou; Ignacio Fontes	20:44
9	Czech Republic; Daniel Kotyza; Bára Stýblová; Pavla Štoudková; Jakub Davidík	21:00
9	Slovenia; Veronika Sadek; Rok Markelj; Klara Lukan; Žan Rudolf	21:04
11	Ukraine; Vadym Lonskyi; Viktoriia Shkurko; Andrii Krakovetskyi; Anzhelika Bondar	21:44
12	Andorra; Carles Gómez Lozano; Aina Cinca Bons; Francesc Carmona Parada; Xènia Mourelo	22:59
