= Cormac Dalton =

Irish long-distance runner

Personal information
- Born: 1 September 1998 (age 28)

Sport
- Sport: Athletics
- Events: Long-distance running, Cross country running

Achievements and titles
- Personal bests: 1500m: 3:45.95 (Belfast, 2024); Mile: 3:59.51 (Stirling, 2024); 5000m: 13:27.81 (Dublin, 2023; 10000m 28:04.29 (Azusa, 2023); Indoors; 3000m: 7:50.09 (Boston, 2025); 5000m: 13:28.29 (Boston, 2025)
Medal record
Men's athletics
Representing Ireland
European Cross Country Championships
Silver medal – second place	2025 Lagoa	Team

Cormac Dalton (born 1 September 1998) is an Irish long-distance and cross country runner.

== Early and personal life ==
He was born in Lynn, Mullingar in County Westmeath into a family of runners. His mother Amanda won the Irish schools cross country title in the 1980s, and his grandfather was a Leinster champion runner. He became a member of the Mullingar Harriers athletics club at the age of nine years-old. He attended Gainstown primary school prior to graduating with a degree in biotechnology from Dublin City University. Following that, he completed a master's degree in business at the University of Tulsa in Oklahoma.

== Career ==
He won the 2023 Irish National Cross Country Championships in Gowran, Kilkenny in November 2023, in a race competed in extreme muddy conditions. He finished eighth overall at the 2023 European Cross Country Championships in Brussels in December 2023, leading the Irish men to a fourth-place team finish.

He competed at the 2024 European Athletics Championships in Rome in June 2024, over 10,000 metres. In August 2024, he ran his first sub-4 minute mile, running 3:59.51 at the Monument Mile Classic in Stirling. He finished third in the Irish Cross Country Championships in November 2024. He was the leading Irishman at the 2024 European Cross Country Championships in Antalya, finishing in 21st place as the Irish team finished eighth overall.

On 14 February 2025, he ran a personal best 13:28.29 over 5000 metres indoors at the BU David Hemery Valentine Invitational, to move to fourth-place on the Irish all-time indoor list. Dalton placed third behind Brian Fay and Nick Griggs at the Irish National Cross Country Championships held in Derry on 23 November 2025. Dalton helped the Irish men's team to a silver medal at the 2025 European Cross Country Championships in Lagoa, Portugal on 14 December 2025, placing eleventh overall in the men's individual race, the third Irishman home after Jack O'Leary and Brian Fay.
