= Jonas Stafford =

Irish athlete (born 2005)

Personal information
- Born: 3 February 2005 (age 21)

Sport
- Sport: Athletics
- Event(s): Long-distance running, Steeplechase
Medal record
Men's athletics
Representing IRE
European Cross Country Championships
| Gold medal – first place | 2023 Brussels | U20 team |

Jonas Stafford (born 3 February 2005) is an Irish long-distance, steeplechase and cross country runner.

== Biography ==
From County Wicklow, Stafford was a member of Ashford Athletics Club. As a 17-year-old, he was the youngest member of the Irish under-20 team who competed at the 2022 European Cross Country Championships in Turin, Italy.

Whilst a student at East Glendalough School in Wicklow, Stafford won the Senior boys title in the 123.ie All-Ireland Schools Cross Country Championships in Waterford in March 2023, winning ahead of Niall Murphy. In June, he won the 5000 metres at the 2023 All Ireland Schools’ Track & Field Championships in Tullamore.

He later moved to Dublin to study chemistry at University College Dublin and joined Dublin Track Club and trained with experienced professionals Andrew Coscoran, Mark English, and Brian Fay and worked with coach Feidhlim Kelly. Stafford was a gold medalist at the 2023 European Cross Country Championships in the men's under-20 team race, alongside Nick Griggs and Niall Murphy, with Stafford improving from 26th after the first lap to finish tenth overall.

Stafford was runner-up in the 3000 metres steeplechase at the Irish Athletics Championships in August 2025. He was selected for the under-23 race at the 2025 European Cross Country Championships in Portugal, in December 2025 as the Irish team won the gold medal in the team race.
