= Khahisa Mhlanga =

British middle-distance runner (born 1999)

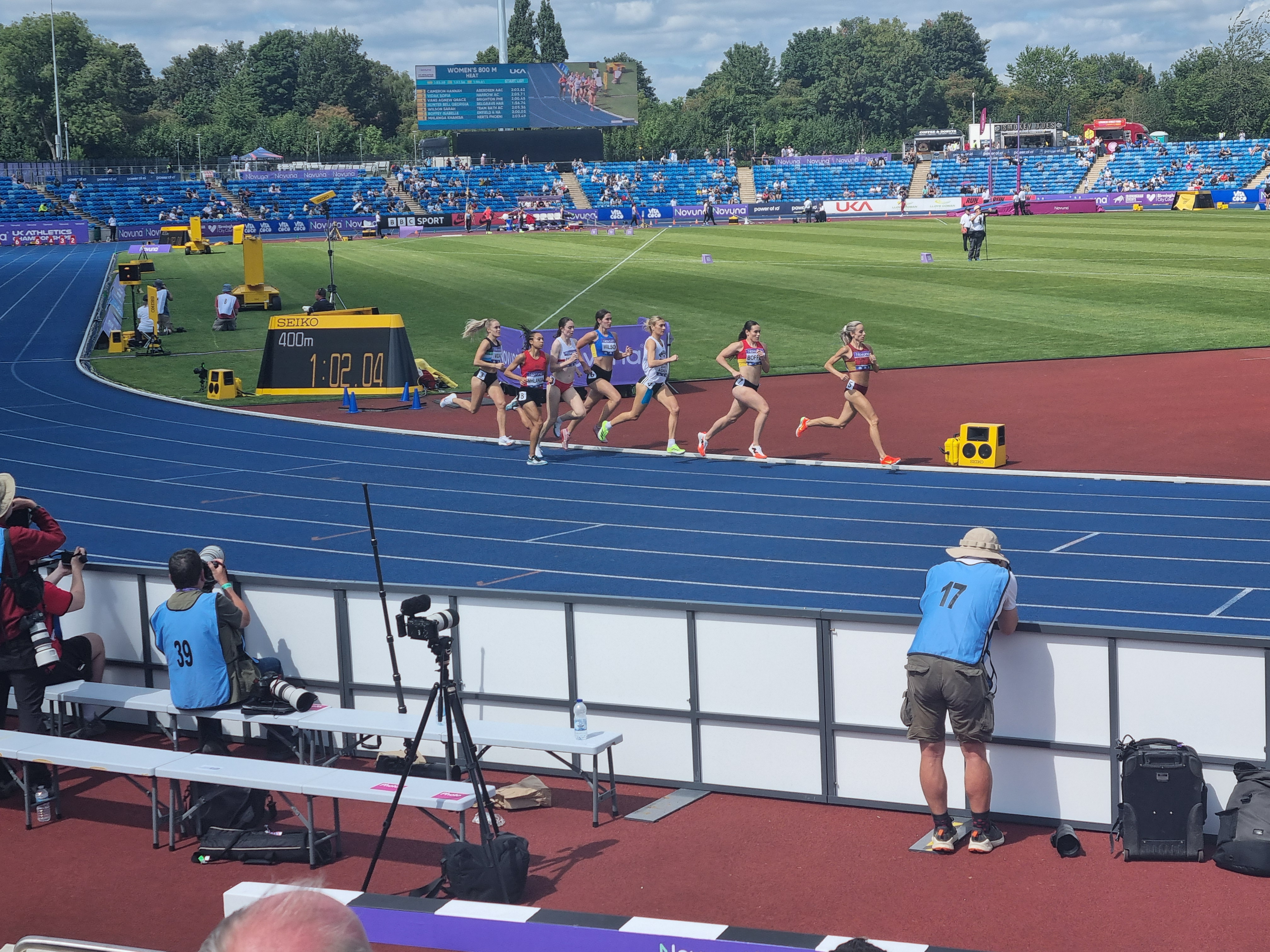
- Mhlanga at the 2025 UK Championships

Personal information
- Born: 26 December 1999 (age 26)

Sport
- Country: Great Britain; England
- Sport: Athletics
- Event: Middle-distance running
Medal record
Women's athletics
Representing Great Britain
European U20 Championships
Gold medal – first place	2017 Grosseto	800 m
European Cross Country Championships
Bronze medal – third place	2023 Brussels	Mixed relay
Gold medal – first place	2018 Tilburg	U20 Team
Gold medal – first place	2017 Samorin	U20 team

Khahisa Mhlanga (born 26 December 1999) is a British cross country and middle-distance runner.

== Biography ==
Coached by her stepfather Mick Judd, Mhlanga won the 2017 English Schools Cross Country Championships in Norwich ahead of her stepsister Jodie Judd, as well having a third place finish at the Inter-Counties Cross Country Championships and fourth at the English National Championships. That year, she won a gold medal over 800 metres at the 2017 European Athletics U20 Championships in Italy, winning ahead of compatriot Ellie Baker and Gabriela Gajanova of Slovakia.

At the 2018 European Cross Country Championships in Tilburg, she finished seventh in the U20 race and won the gold medal in the team competition alongside Amelia Quirk and Grace Brock.

In 2021, she finished fourth in the 800 metres at the 2021 European Athletics U23 Championships in Tallinn, with a time of 2:04.05. Competing for Great Britain at the 2022 European Cross Country Championships in Turin, she finished fifth with the mixed relay team. In December 2023, she was a bronze medalist in the mixed relay at the 2023 European Cross Country Championships in Brussels, running the final leg alongside Joshua Lay and Adam Fogg and Bethan Morley.

In September 2025, she placed second at the Westminster Mile in London behind Holly Dixon, in 4:31.

In May 2026, Mhpanga won over 800 metres at the British Milers Club Trafford Grand Prix. In June, she placed fifth in the final of the 800 metres at the 2026 British Championships.
