= Tia Wilson =

British athlete (born 2002)

Personal information
- Born: 7 June 2002 (age 24)

Sport
- Sport: Athletics
- Events: Middle-distance running, Cross Country running

Achievements and titles
- Personal bests: 800m: 2:11.56 (2025); 1500m: 4:06.43 (2026); Mile: 4:30.10 (2025); 3000m: 9:03.16 (2026); 5000m: 15:33.19 (2025); Road; 5k: 15:58 (2024)
Medal record
Women's athletics
Representing Great Britain
European Cross Country Championships
Gold medal – first place	2024 Antalya	U23 Team

Tia Wilson (born 7 June 2002) is a British middle-distance and cross country runner.

== Biography ==
Wilson is a member of Bedford and County Athletics Club. She was a member of the British U23 team at the 2023 European Cross Country Championships.

In February 2024, she was part of the British gold medal winning short course relay team at the World University Cross Country Championships in Muscat, Oman. Competing for Loughborough University, she was runner up in the 5000 metres at the British Universities and Colleges Sport (BUCS) Championships.

Having moved to the United States, in November 2024 she was a member of the University of Florida team which finished third at the Southeastern Conference Cross Country Championships. Returning to Europe, Wilson was a gold medalist in the team U23 event at the 2024 European Cross Country Championships in Antalya, Turkey in December 2024.

Competing for the University of Florida in May 2026 at the NCAA East Regionals, Wilson ran 4:09.38 for the 1500 metres and qualified for the 2026 NCAA Outdoor Championships. In June, she reached the final of the 1500 metres at the 2026 UK Championships, placing eighth overall. The following month, she had a second place finish over 1500 m behind Silan Ayyaldiz at the Folksam Grand Prix in Karlstad, Sweden.
