= Bethan Morley =

British athlete (born 2001)

Personal information
- Nationality: Great Britain
- Born: 9 October 2001 (age 24)

Sport
- Sport: Athletics
- Event: Cross country running

Achievements and titles
- Personal best(s): 800m: 2:02.76 (Loughborough, 2024); 1500m: 4:09.28 (Boston, 2025); Mile: 4:26.76 (Boston, 2025); 3000m: 9:28.04 (Loughborough, 2024); 5km (road): 16:08 (Leicester, 2024)
Medal record
Women's athletics
Representing Great Britain
World Cross Country Championships
Bronze medal – third place	2024 Belgrade	Mixed relay
European Cross Country Championships
Bronze medal – third place	2023 Brussels	Mixed relay

Bethan Morley (born 9 October 2001) is a British long distance and cross country runner.

== Early life ==
Morley attended Ilkley Grammar School. In 2018, she became the Yorkshire under-17 cross country champion. She went on to study Business Economics at Loughborough University, and the University of Florida.

== Career ==
In November 2023, Morley won the British Universities and Colleges (BUCS) short course cross country title in Liverpool.

In December 2023, she was a bronze medalist in the mixed relay at the 2023 European Cross Country Championships in Brussels alongside Joshua Lay and Adam Fogg and Khahisa Mhlanga.

In February 2024, she was part of the British gold medal winning short course relay team at the World University Cross Country Championships in Muscat, Oman.

In March 2024, she was a bronze medalist in the mixed relay at the 2024 World Cross Country Championships in Belgrade. In May 2024, she ran a personal best 4:11.84 for the 1500 metres at the British Milers Club in Manchester.
