= Eloise Walker =

Scottish athlete (born 2001)

Personal information
- Nationality: British (Scottish)
- Born: 27 May 2001 (age 25)

Sport
- Sport: Track and field
- Events: Middle distance, long distance running

Achievements and titles
- Personal bests: 1500m: 4:09.09 (Manchester, 2023); Mile: 4:30.64 (Stirling, 2025); 3000m: 8:34.80 (London, 2026); 5000m: 15:23.92 (Vienna, 2025); 5km: 15:34 (Newcastle, 2023)
Medal record
Representing Great Britain
European Cross Country Championships
Gold medal – first place	2023 Brussels	U23 Team
Gold medal – first place	2022 Turin	U23 Team
Bronze medal – third place	2021 Dublin	U23 Team

Eloise Walker (born 27 May 2001) is a British track and field athlete who competes as a middle distance, long distance and cross county runner.

== Biography ==
Walker set a new Scottish under-20 record in the 3000m in February 2020, running a time of 9:21.30 seconds. Later that month, at the British Indoor Championships, in Glasgow, she set a new indoor personal best in the 1500m of 4:23.32 seconds, finishing in fifth place in the final. That winter, she joined the Andy Young led training-squad that also contained compatriots Laura Muir and Jemma Reekie.

Walker represented Scotland in the 5000m at the 2022 Commonwealth Games. She was also selected for the 2022 European Cross Country Championships in Turin for the U23 race.

In September 2023, she ran a new 5000m personal best at the Diamond League event in Xiamen, China. She was selected for the 2023 European Cross Country Championships in Brussels in December 2023. She won gold as part of the successful British squad which won the U23 team event.

On 2 August, she finished sixth in the final of the 5000 metres at the 2025 UK Athletics Championships in Birmingham in 15:52.99.

On 15 February 2026, Walker placed third in the 3000 metres at the 2026 British Indoor Athletics Championships in Birmingham, in 8:48.45, behind Hannah Nuttall. She ran inside the course record in placing second to Izzy Fry in 15:19 over 5k in Battersea on 28 February 2026. On 20 June, Walker placed third behind Nuttall and Innes FitzGerald in the 5000 metres race at the 2026 UK Athletics Championships. Competing at the 2026 London Athletics Meet on 18 July, Walker ran a 3000 metres personal best of 8:34.80.

Walker was named in the Scottish team for the 2026 Commonwealth Games in Glasgow.

== Personal life ==
She is a Glasgow University student. She is a member of the M11 Track Club, coached by Trevor Painter and Jenny Meadows.
