= Niall Murphy (runner) =

Irish athlete (born 2004)

Personal information
- Born: 26 October 2004 (age 22)

Sport
- Sport: Athletics
- Event: Long distance running
Medal record
Men's athletics
Representing IRE
European Cross Country Championships
Gold medal – first place	2025 Lagoa	U23 team
Gold medal – first place	2023 Brussels	U20 team

Niall Murphy (born 26 October 2004) is an Irish long-distance and cross country runner.

== Biography ==
Murphy is from County Clare and a member of Ennis Track Club. He was runner-up at the Senior boys race at the All-Ireland Schools Cross Country Championships in Waterford in March 2023, finishing behind Jonas Stafford. He was a gold medalist representing Ireland at the 2023 European Cross Country Championships in the men's under-20 team race, alongside Nick Griggs and Stafford, and was the second Irish finisher with ninth overall, one place ahead of Stafford.

In December 2024, he was the second Irish finisher in the men's under-23 race at the 2024 European Cross Country Championships in Antalya, Turkey, with a 23rd-place finish.

Murphy was selected for the under-23 race at the 2025 European Cross Country Championships in Portugal, in December 2025. He had a tenth-place finish in Lagoa to score for Ireland as they won the team gold medal in the under-23 race with Griggs winning the individual race and Callum Morgan placing eighth.

Murphy placed third in the men's senior race at the 2026 Irish Cross Country Championships on 22 November 2026, also winning the men's under-23 title.
