= Hugh Armstrong =

Hugh Armstrong may refer to:

- Hugh Armstrong (politician) (1858–1926), Canadian politician
- Hugh Armstrong (actor) (1944–2016), British actor
- Hugh Armstrong (runner) (born 1994), Irish long-distance runner
