= Magnus Tuv Myhre =

Norwegian long-distance runner

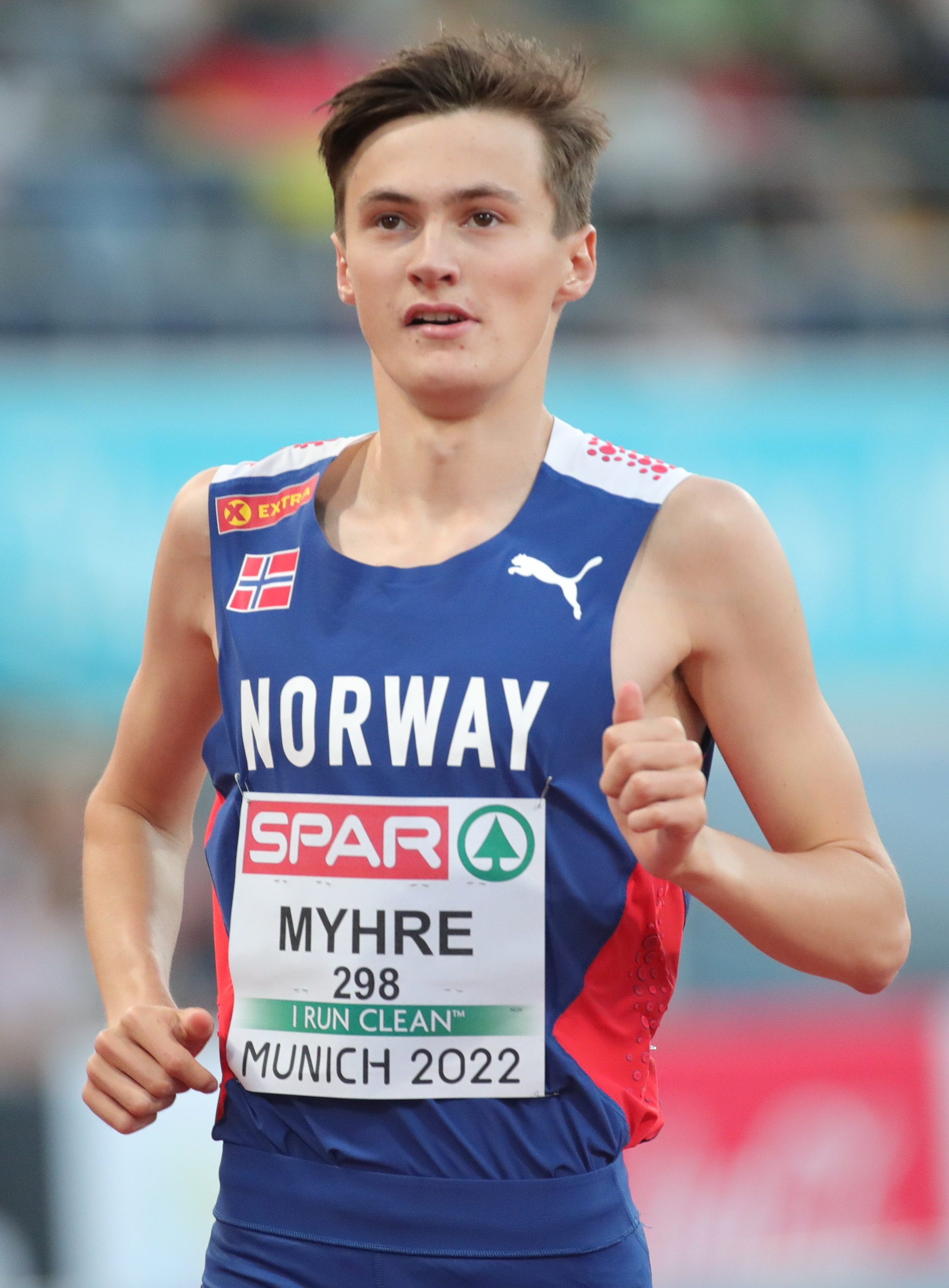
- Myhre in 2022

Personal information
- Nationality: Norwegian
- Born: 15 June 2000 (age 26)

Sport
- Sport: Track
- Event: 1500 metres – 10,000 metres
- Club: Brandbu IF
Medal record
Men's athletics
Representing Norway
European Cross Country Championships
Silver medal – second place	2023 Brussels	Senior race

Magnus Tuv Myhre (born 15 June 2000) is a Norwegian middle and long-distance runner. He won the 5000 metres at the 2022 and 2023 Norwegian Athletics Championships, as well as the 2022 national cross-country championships. He also competed in the 5000 metres at the 2023 World Athletics Championships.

In December 2023 he won a silver medal at the 2023 European Cross Country Championships in Brussels, placing second behind winner Yann Schrub.

== Personal bests ==
Outdoor

- 1500 metres – 3:37.89 (Jessheim 2023)
- 3000 metres – 7:48.07 (Bergan 2022)
- 5000 metres – 13:09.44 (Oslo 2023)
- 10,000 metres – 28:02.18 (Munich 2022)

Indoor

- 3000 metres – 7:51.30 (Istanbul 2023)
