= Flavien Szot =

French middle-distance runner (born 2001)

Personal information
- Born: 6 September 2001 (age 25) Montpellier, France
- Height: 178 cm (5 ft 10 in)
- Weight: 64 kg (141 lb)

Sport
- Country: France
- Sport: Athletics
- Events: Middle-distance running, cross country running
- Coached by: Adrien Taoudji

Achievements and titles
- Personal bests: 800m: 1:45.71 (2026); 1500m: 3:30.74 (2025); Mile: 3:52.67 (2025); 3000m: 7:39.89 (2026)
Medal record
Men's athletics
Representing France
European Cross Country Championships
Silver medal – second place	2023 Brussels	U23 team
Mediterranean Games
Gold medal – first place	2026 Taranto	1500 m

Flavien Szot (born 6 September 2001) is a French middle-distance and cross country runner.

== Biography ==
From Castres, his running clubs have included Bordeaux Athle, and Racing Multi Athlon. The French U23 Cross Country champion in Carhaix in 2023, and that year won a silver medal with the French U23 men's team at the 2023 European Cross Country Championships in Brussels.

Competing in Dresden, Germany, in the World Athletics Continental Tour on 1 June 2025, Szot ran a personal best time for the 1500 metres of 3:33.72. Later that month, Szot ran a new personal best 3:30.74 as he competed over 1500 metres at the 2025 Meeting de Paris. He ran 3:54.74 in the invitational mile the following month at the 2025 Prefontaine Classic on 5 July. That month, Szot set a meeting record of 7:41.63 for the 3000 metres at the Meeting International de Marseille. In Oslo, in August, Szot was runner-up to Canadian Max Davies in 3:34.52 for the 1500 metres at the Sankthanshaugen 5,000 meeting. He placed fifth in the 1500 metres at the 2025 French Championships, running 3:34.29 in Talence.

In January 2026, he won in the mile at the Dr. Sander Invitational in New York. The following month, he was runner-up to Azeddine Habz over 3000 metres at the 2026 French Indoor Athletics Championships in Aubiere.

In May 2026, he ran a season’s best 3:32.24 for the 1500 metres at the 2026 Meeting International Mohammed VI d'Athlétisme de Rabat, part of the 2026 Diamond League. On 7 June, he had a top-ten finish in the 1500 m at the Diamond League event in Stockholm. Competing in the mile run at the World Athletics Road Running Championships on 19 September 2026, Szot set a national record of 3:53.44 to finish in fifth place overall.
