= Danielle Donegan =

Irish athlete

Personal information
- Nationality: Ireland
- Born: 5 April 2001 (age 25)

Sport
- Sport: Athletics
- Event: Cross-country

Achievements and titles
- Personal bests: 5000m: 16:48.65 (Belfast, 2023); 10000m: 35:14.73 (London, 2023)

Danielle Donegan (born 5 April 2001) is an Irish cross country runner from County Offaly. She has won the Irish Cross Country Championships and represented Ireland at multiple European Cross Country Championships.

== Early life ==
She attended the Sacred Heart School in Tullamore, County Offaly. A high finish in the All Ireland Schools Cross Country competition in 2017 meant she was selected to run for Ireland at the Schools International Cross Country, in Port Talbot, Wales, that year.

== Career ==
A Tullamore Harriers AC athlete, she finished 31st she finished in the U23 race at the 2021 European Cross Country Championships in Dublin. The following year, she finished 28th at the 2022 European Cross Country Championships in the U23 race in Turin, Italy.

She finished third in the Irish senior cross country championships and won the Irish U23 national cross country title in 2023. She was subsequently selected for the 2023 European Cross Country Championships in Belgium in December 2023. She finished eighth in the U23 race in Brussels.

In March 2024, she led the Tullamore Harriers AC to team gold at the Irish 10 km national championships in Dunboyne. She was selected to compete at the 2024 World Athletics Cross Country Championships in Serbia for her debut senior international appearance. In November 2024, she finished third at the Irish national cross country championship. She was selected for the 2024 European Cross Country Championships in Istanbul, Turkey.

Donegan placed third again at the 2025 Irish National Cross Country Championships held in Derry on 23 November. The following year, she finished on the podium again as she placed second to defending champion Fiona Everard at the 2026 Irish Cross Country Championships.

== Personal life ==
She graduated from University College Dublin. In 2023 she started working as a radiographer in St Vincent's Hospital, Dublin. Her parents John and Marie are long time members of Tullamore Harriers. Her sister Nadine is also a national level cross-country runner. Her brothers Jason, Mark and Jack and younger sister Rachel also run competitively.
