= Axel Vang Christensen =

Danish athlete

Personal information
- Nationality: Danish
- Born: 30 July 2004 (age 22)

Sport
- Sport: Athletics
- Events: Steeplechase, cross-country

Achievements and titles
- Personal bests: 3000m Steeplechase: 8:29.12 (Bergen, 2022); 5km: 13:42 (Monaco, 2022); 10km: 29:01 (Århus, 2022)
Medal record
Men's athletics
Representing Denmark
European U20 Championships
Silver medal – second place	2021 Tallinn	3000m steeplechase
European Cross Country Championships
Bronze medal – third place	2024 Antalya	U23 Team
Gold medal – first place	2023 Brussels	U20 race
Gold medal – first place	2021 Dublin	U20 race

Axel Vang Christensen (born 30 July 2004) is a Danish track and field athlete and cross-country runner. He is the 2021 and 2023 European Cross Country U20 champion.

== Early life ==
Christensen was brought up in Hillerod, to the north of Copenhagen. He started running initially just in order to increase his fitness for football. However, he won an under-age national title when 11 years-old and changed his focus to athletics. He attended the University of Birmingham, where he was a contemporary of Will Barnicoat.

== Career ==
In 2021 he won silver in the 3000 Metres Steeplechase at the 2021 European Athletics U20 Championships in Tallinn. He won the U20 race at the 2021 European Cross Country Championships in Dublin.

In 2021, he also won the Danish national championships over 10k, and retained the title in 2022, finishing a minute ahead of Thijs Nijhuis. In 2022, in Lillesø, he beat the Jakob Ingebrigtsen's U20 European record for 3000 meters indoors. He competed in the 3000m steeplechase at the 2022 European Athletics Championships in Munich, however he picked up an injury during the race and could not complete the course.

In December 2023, he won the 2023 European Cross Country Championships U20 race in Brussels, finishing strongly ahead of Niels Laros and Nick Griggs.

In November 2024, Christensen defended his title in the senior men's race at the Danish Cross Country Championships in Odense. In December 2024, he won a bronze medal in the U23 race at the 2024 European Cross Country Championships in Antalya, Turkey.

On 29 March 2025, he finished in third place at the Danish 10 km Road Running Championships, in Århus, running a time of 29:38. In April 2026, he ran 29:33 to place second to Joel Ibler Lillesø at the Danish 10 km road running championships in Århus.
