= Jack O'Leary (runner) =

Irish athlete (born 1997)

Personal information
- Nationality: Irish
- Born: 4 November 1997 (age 29)

Sport
- Sport: Athletics
- Events: Cross country, Long-distance running
Medal record
Men's athletics
Representing Ireland
European Cross Country Championships
Silver medal – second place	2025 Lagoa	Team

Jack O'Leary (born 4 November 1997) is an Irish long-distance and cross country runner. He was a silver medalist in the team race at the 2025 European Cross Country Championships.

== Early life ==
From Westmeath, he grew up on his family's Lynn Lodge Stud farm in Killucan. A jockey in his youth, he rode horses for trainer Gordon Elliott.

== Career ==
As a junior runner, O'Leary won the Leinster Schools Cross Country Championships in 2016. That year, competing for Mullingar Harriers, he won the Irish Under-20 national cross country title in Abbotstown.

A member of the Athletics Ireland National Endurance Group, O'Leary set new personal bests over 5000 metres and 10,000 metres in 2025, and placed third over 5000m at the Irish Athletics Championships in 2025.

O'Leary led the Irish men's team to a silver medal at the 2025 European Cross Country Championships in Lagoa, Portugal on 14 December 2025, placing fifth overall in the men's individual race.

On 11 January 2026, O'Leary lowered his personal best for the 10 km to 27:41 whilst competing in Valencia. On 26 July, he placed second overall behind Darragh McElhinney in the 5000 metres at the 2026 Irish championships. In August, he competed at the 2026 European Athletics Championships in Birmingham, England, placing tenth in the 10,000 metres.

In Valencia in October 2026, O'Leary ran 1:01.05 for the half marathon to move sixth on the Irish all-time list in his debut race over the distance. On 22 November, O'Leary finished second to defending champion Brian Fay at the 2026 Irish Cross Country Championships.

== Personal life ==
He had an athletics scholarship to study at Iona College in New York. His father Eddie O'Leary is the racing manager for Gigginstown House Stud. He is the nephew of Ryanair CEO Michael O'Leary. His cousin is Irish rugby union player Rowan Osborne.
