= Brian Fay (runner) =

Irish long-distance runner

- Fay competing at the 2024 Bislett Games

Personal information
- Nationality: Irish
- Born: 9 November 1998 (age 28) Dublin
- Education: Belvedere College; Dublin City University; University of Washington

Sport
- Country: Ireland
- Sport: Athletics
- Events: 5000m 3000m steeplechase
- Club: Raheny Shamrock Athletic Club

Achievements and titles
- Personal bests: 3000m: 7:34.48 (London, 2024); 5000m: 13:01.40 (Heusden, 2023) (NR); 3000m steeplechase: 8:29.75 (Budapest, 2021); 10,000m: 27:43.45 (California, 2024)
Medal record
Men's athletics
Representing Ireland
European Cross Country Championships
Silver medal – second place	2025 Lagoa	Team

Brian Fay (born 9 November 1998) is an Irish long-distance runner. He has been the Irish national champion at cross country running and the 3000m steeplechase, as well as the Irish national record holder over 5000 metres.

== Early and personal life ==
Fay grew up in Glasnevin, as one of quadruplets, and attended Belvedere College where he was coached by Ronan Duggan and where former Olympian Phil Conway was also involved in coaching. He was then coached by Feidhlim Kelly at Dublin City University. He then attended the University of Washington in 2021, where he was coached by Andy Powell. In 2023, he returned to Dublin and the coaching of Feidhlim Kelly at the Dublin Track Club. After being based in Australia for a period of time, Fay returned to Ireland to Dublin in 2026.

== Career ==
=== 2021 ===
Competing in Manchester in May 2021, Fay ran the fastest 3000m steeplechase by an Irishman for 36 years. He ran a time of 8:33.93, placing him fourth on the all-time Irish list. He lowered his personal best time to 8:29.75 competing in Tatabanya, Hungary in June 2021. That month he also won the Irish national title in the discipline at the Morton Track in Dublin.

=== 2022 ===
Fay finished eighth at the 2022 European Athletics Championships 5000 metres race.

=== 2023 ===
In July 2023, Fay broke the Irish 5000m record, running 13:01.40 at the Night of Athletics meeting in Heusden, Belgium. This was two seconds faster than the previous record, held by Alistair Cragg since September 2011. Fay finished second in the race, won by Kenya's Cornelius Kemboi. The time met the qualifying standard for the 2023 World Athletics Championships in Budapest and the 2024 Paris Olympics. He competed in Budapest at the 2023 Worlds and ran 13:42 without qualifying for the final.

In November 2023, he was part of the Irish team which finished fourth in the team event at the 2023 European Cross Country Championships in Brussels.

=== 2024 ===
He was selected for the Irish team for the 2024 European Athletics Championships. He ran a personal best 7:34.48 for the 3000 metres at the London Athletics Meet on 20 July 2024. He competed in the 5000 metres at the 2024 Summer Olympics in Paris in August 2024.

=== 2025 ===
He finished tenth in the 5000 metres at the 2025 Shanghai Diamond League event in China on 3 May 2025. He was selected for the 2025 European Athletics Team Championships Second Division in Maribor in June 2025. He was runner-up to Andrew Coscoran in the 5000m at the 2025 Irish Athletics Championships. In September 2025, he competed over 5000 metres at the 2025 World Championships in Tokyo, Japan, without advancing to the final.

Fay won the Irish National Cross Country Championships held in Derry on 23 November 2025, finishing ahead of Nick Griggs and Cormac Dalton. Fay helped the Irish men's team to a silver medal at the 2025 European Cross Country Championships in Lagoa, Portugal on 14 December 2025, placing tenth overall in the men's individual race, the second Irishman home after Jack O'Leary.

=== 2026 ===
Fay was selected for the 2026 World Athletics Cross Country Championships in Tallahassee, where he placed 16th overall. On 26 July, he placed third overall behind Darragh McElhinney and Jack O'Leary in the 5000 metres at the 2026 Irish championships. In August, he competed at the 2026 European Athletics Championships in Birmingham, England, in the 5000 metres, placing fourteenth.

On 22 November, Fay retained his title at the Irish Cross Country Championships, finishing fast to overhaul long-time leader Jack O'Leary in the closing straight.
