= Izzy Fry =

British athlete (born 2000)

Personal information
- Nationality: British
- Born: Isobel Fry; 4 May 2000 (age 26)

Sport
- Sport: Track and field
- Events: Middle distance, long distance running

Achievements and titles
- Personal bests: 1500m: 4:17.07 (Watford, 2021); 3000m: 8:52.15 (Boston, 2024); 5000m: 15:05.66 (Rome, 2024); 5km: 15:17 (Monaco, 2026); 10km: 31:01 (Valencia, 2026)
Medal record
Representing United Kingdom
European Cross Country Championships
Gold medal – first place	2023 Brussels	Team
Silver medal – second place	2024 Antalya	Team
Bronze medal – third place	2021 Dublin	U23 Team
Gold medal – first place	2019 Lisbon	U20 Team

Isobel Fry (born 4 May 2000) is a British track and field athlete and cross country runner. She won the British national title over 10,000 metres in 2026.

== Early life ==
Fry attended Park House School in Newbury, Berkshire.

== Career ==
A member of Newbury Athletic Club, Fry finished fourth in the 5000m at the 2019 European Athletics U20 Championships in Boras, Sweden in 2019. In March 2020, she reached the number one in the world junior cross country rankings and straddled that with top-10 finishes at the 2019 and 2021 European Cross Country Championships in the age-group category events, winning gold as part of the women's U20 team in Lisbon in 2019. She also finished fourth at the 2020 UK National Championships over 5000m.

=== 2022 ===
Fry became World University Cross Country champion in March 2022, in Aveiro, Portugal. She was also part of a gold medal-winning a British squad in the team event. Later that year, she finished third at the NI International Cross Country event, in Belfast.

=== 2023 ===
Fry's 2023 was severely hampered by a serious foot injury which she received in the spring and missed the entire track season. She was selected for the 2023 European Cross Country Championships in Brussels in December 2023. She finished tenth overall, and won gold as part of the successful British squad which won the team event.

=== 2024 ===
In February 2024, in Boston, Massachusetts, Fry ran a new personal best over 3000 metres, running 8:52.15. The following week she lowered her 5000m personal best to 15:07.76 in Boston.

In May 2024, she was selected to run the 5000 metres for Britain at the 2024 European Athletics Championships in Rome. she finished ninth in the 5000m final with a new pb of 15:05.66. In 2024, she finished third in the 5000m at the 2024 British Athletics Championships in Manchester. She was selected for the British team for the 2024 European Cross Country Championships in Antalya, Turkey where she placed 14th to help Britain win team silver.

=== 2025 ===
Fry finished third in the British women's 10,000m national championship race in Birmingham in June 2025, running a time of 31:47.60.

Fry had a third-place finish at the 2025 Liverpool Cross Challenge on 22 November to gain automatic selection for the 2025 European Cross Country Championships where the British team won the silver medal in the team event in December 2025. Later that month, Fry won in Newcastle on New Year's Eve over 5 km at the inaugural HogmanHoway race.

=== 2026 ===
Competing in Valencia on 11 January 2026, Fry ran a personal best over 10 km, with a time of 31:01. She ran a personal best of 15:17 for 5 km in Monaco, before setting a new course record in winning in 15:18 over 5k in Battersea in February 2026. Fry won the British national 10,000 metres title in Loughborough on 17 May 2026, finishing in 32:12.91. Fry competed in the 10,000 metres at the 2026 Commonwealth Games in Glasgow, Scotland, placing eleventh overall. Two weeks later, Fry was 16th in 32:37.22 after falling about two thirds of the way into the 10,000 metres at the 2026 European Championships in Birmingham.
