= Callum Morgan =

Irish and Northern Irish athlete (born 2003)

Personal information
- Born: 18 June 2003 (age 23)

Sport
- Sport: Athletics
- Events: Long-distance running, Cross Country running
Medal record
Men's athletics
Representing IRE
European Cross Country Championships
Gold medal – first place	2025 Lagoa	U23 team

Callum Morgan (born 18 June 2003) is an Irish long-distance and cross county runner.

== Biography ==
From Glengormley, Morgan, was a pupil of St Malachy's College in Belfast. He received a funding award from the Mary Peters Trust in January 2024. A member of Candour Track Club (CNDR), he ran a personal best to win the Men's A race of the 3000 metres in 7.59.37 at the Belfast Milers meeting in May 2024. In December 2024, he was selected for the 2024 European Cross Country Championships in Antalya, Turkey. He was the third Irish finisher in the men's under-23 race at the, with a 29th-place finish.

Morgan finished tenth over 5000 metres in 13.53.18 at the 2025 European Athletics U23 Championships in Bergen, Norway. In October 2025, Morgan won his first senior race at The Autumn Open International Cross Country Festival in Dublin, a World Athletics Cross Country Tour Bronze meeting. That month, he placed fourth in the under-23 race at the Ireland Cross Country Championships in Derry. He was subsequently selected for the under-23 race at the 2025 European Cross Country Championships in Portugal, in December 2025. He had an eighth-place finish in Lagoa to score for Ireland as he won the team gold medal in the under-23 race alongside Nick Griggs and Niall Murphy.

On 11 January 2026, Morgan lowered his personal best for the 10 km to 28:08 whilst competing in Valencia. Later that month, he ran an indoor personal best of 7:55.82 for the 3000 metres in Boston, Massachusetts, and the 5000 metres in 13:31.47 the following week at the Boston Terrier Classic. On 1 March 2026, he placed third in the 3000 metres at the Irish Indoor Athletics Championships in 8:16.30 behind Nick Griggs and Darragh McElhinney. In May, Morgan finished second to Henry McLuckie in a lifetime best of 7:47.62 for the 3000m at The Belfast Classic. He competed for Northern Ireland in the 5000 metres at the 2026 Commonwealth Games in Glasgow, Scotland. On 22 November, Morgan placed fourth in the senior men’s race at the 2026 Irish Cross Country Championships.
