= Fabien Palcau =

French athlete

Personal information
- Born: 22 June 1997 (age 29) Dijon, France
- Height: 173 cm (5 ft 8 in)
- Weight: 56 kg (123 lb)

Sport
- Country: France
- Sport: Athletics
- Events: Middle-distance running; Cross country running
- Club: Entente Savoie Athlé
- Coached by: Vincent Guyot

Achievements and titles
- Personal bests: 1500 m: 3:41.30 (Brussels, 2025); 3000 m: 7:40.81 (Boston, 2025); 5000 m: 13:11.03 (Boston, 2025); 10000 m: 28:07.01 (Pace, 2020)
Medal record
Men's athletics
Representing France
European Cross Country Championships
Silver medal – second place	2023 Brussels	Team
Bronze medal – third place	2025 Lagoa	Team
Gold medal – first place	2019 Lisbon	U23 team
Gold medal – first place	2018 Tilburg	U23 team
Gold medal – first place	2015 Hyères	Junior team
Silver medal – second place	2015 Hyères	Junior race

Fabien Palcau (born 22 June 1997) is a French middle- and long-distance and cross country runner. He was a silver medalist in 2023 and a bronze medalist in 2025 in the team competitions at the European Cross Country Championships.

== Career ==
A member of Dijon UC, he stated to his school teachers that he intended to become a runner by 2007, at the age of ten years-old. Palcau was the silver medalist in the junior men's individual race at the 2015 European Cross Country Championships in December 2015, in Hyères, France. The following March, Palcau, won the French Junior Championship title in Le Mans.

He was a gold medalist in the under-23 team races at the 2018 European Cross Country Championships in Tilburg, Netherlands, and 2019 European Cross Country Championships in Lisbon, Portugal.

At the French Cross Country Championships in March 2023, he finished third behind Jimmy Gressier with Palcau happily accepting a bite of crepe from Gressier at the finish line. At the 2023 European Cross Country Championships in Brussels. he won the silver medal in the team event.

In April 2025, Palcau placed fourth in the men's 10km race at the 2025 European Running Championships in Belgium. He placed thirteenth over 5000 metres in Monaco at the 2025 Herculis, part of the 2025 Diamond League.

Palcau was the second French finisher behind Jimmy Gressier, with the pair winning the bronze medal alongside Simon Bedard in the team event at the 2025 European Cross Country Championships in Lagoa, Portugal, in December 2025. He was selected to represent France at the 2026 World Athletics Cross Country Championships in Tallahassee, Florida, placing 37th overall.
