= Jill Clarke Harrison =

English long-distance runner

Jill Harrison née Clarke
Personal information
- Nationality: British (English)
- Born: 20 June 1958 (age 68) Derbyshire, England

Sport
- Sport: Athletics
- Event: long distance
- Club: Sheffield AC

Jill Harrison (née Clarke; born 20 June 1958) is an English long-distance runner. She is the 1980 World University Cross Country Champion. At the age of 55 in 2013, she won the 5000 metres and 10,000 metres at the World Masters Athletics Championships.

== Biography ==
Clarke grew up in a small village in Derbyshire. She didn't discover running until encouraged in a PE lesson to train for the Sheffield schools championships. This lead her to run for Britain at the age of 19. By this time she had already been 2nd in the English Schools. She studied at the Birmingham and Loughborough Universities and turned down a scholarship to an American University. She became World Student Champion in cross country in 1998.

Clarke finished third behind Zola Budd in the 5,000 metres event at the 1985 WAAA Championships, before she became British 10,000 metres champion after winning the British WAAA Championships title at the 1986 WAAA Championships.

Clarke represented England, competing in the 10,000 metres at the 1986 Commonwealth Games in Edinburgh, Scotland, but dropped out due to injury. At the 1987 WAAA Championships Clarke finished second behind Sue Crehan in the 10,000 metres event.

She ran 2:34:19 to finish 14th at the 1989 London Marathon and after marrying the same year competed under her married name thereafter. Coaches have included George Gandy, Brian Scoby and Frank Horwill. Training partners have included 1989 London Marathon winner Veronique Marot, 1984 Olympic silver medallist Wendy Sly, and Angie Pain. She won at the 2013 World Masters Championships, running 19:29 in the 5000m and 42:25 in the 10,000m.

Harrison now lives in the West Country with her husband and two children.

== Personal bests ==
All-time rankings as of June 2017

- 5000 metres - 15:34.16 in 1985 (45th on UK all-time list)
- 10 km (road) - 32:41 in 1987 (36th on UK all-time list)
- Half-marathon - 71:44 in 1987 (26th on UK all-time list)
- Marathon - 2:34:19 in 1989 (46th on UK-all-time list)

== Events ==
- World University Cross Country Championships Women (individual) Gold Medal Jill Clarke/Harrison 1980
- Vulcan Run-1987 November 3 place Jill Clarke/Harrison in 33´32´´
- 10,000 meters 33´27´´ 1st place Hull 22-jun-1986
- 10 kilometers (road) 32´41´´ 4th place Orlando, Florida USA 21-feb-1987
- 15 kilometers (road) 50´27´´ 2nd place Jacksonville, Florida USA 14-mar-1987
- 10 miles (road) 54´27´´ 4th place Washington, D.C.. USA 2-abril-1989
- Half marathon 1º11´44´´ 1st place Fleet 29-mar-1987
- 25 kilometers (road) 1º30´33´´ 2nd place Glasgow 30-sep-1990
- Marathon 2º34´19´´ 14th place London Marathon 23-April-1989 toda esta información está en (http://www.gbrathletics.com/uk/wc99.htm)
