= World University Cross Country Championships =

International biennal cross country running competition

The World University Cross Country Championships is an international biennial cross country running competition for student athletes, organised by the International University Sports Federation (FISU). The 2012 edition of the competition featured 76 male and 61 female athletes from 23 countries. Over the history of the event, 64 countries have competed but only three (France, Great Britain and Spain) have been present at all editions of the championships.

First established in 1968 as a men's-only event, a women's race was added in 1976 and FISU gave the event its official sanctioning two years later. The programme of each championship consists of one men's and one women's race, with prizes being available for individuals and national teams. The team races are decided by comparing the sum of the finishing places of each nation's top four finishers (for men) or top three finishers (for women). Each country may enter up to six male athletes and five female athletes. A mixed-sex relay was introduced at the 2022 edition.

The 2020 edition set for Marrakesh was postponed due to the COVID-19 pandemic.

All editions of the competition up to 2006 were hosted by Western European countries. Algiers became the first African nation to host the event in 2006 and Kingston, Ontario, brought it to North America for the first time in 2010. Although the competition is limited to athletes studying at university level, the championships has nevertheless attracted top-level competitors, including: World Championship medallists Steve Moneghetti and Mariem Alaoui Selsouli, as well as World Cross Country team medallists Antonio Serrano and Iulia Olteanu. The short-distance cross country event was introduced at the 2024 edition in Muscat. As a result, starting from 2024 there are six races: the long race and short race (for both men and women) held on Saturday, and a short relay and long relay held on Sunday.

== Editions ==
Edition	Year	City	Country	Date	Countries	Athletes
—	1968	Ghent	Belgium			
—	1970	Bern	Switzerland			
—	1972	Guildford	Great Britain			
—	1974	Madrid	Spain			
—	1976	Leuven	Belgium			
1st	1978	Lausanne	Switzerland			
2nd	1980	Coleraine	Great Britain			
3rd	1982	Darmstadt	West Germany			
4th	1984	Antwerp	Belgium			
5th	1986	Graz	Austria			
6th	1988	Bologna	Italy			
7th	1990	Poznań	Poland			
8th	1992	Dijon	France			
9th	1994	Limerick	Ireland			
10th	1996	Albufeira	Portugal			
11th	1998	Luton	Great Britain			
12th	2000	Jena	Germany			
13th	2002	Santiago de Compostela	Spain			
14th	2004	Collegno	Italy			
15th	2006	Algiers	Algeria			
16th	2008	Forges-les-Eaux	France			
17th	2010	Kingston	Canada	11 April	14	96
18th	2012	Łódź	Poland	14 April	23	137
19th	2014	Entebbe	Uganda	22 March	18	103
20th	2016	Cassino	Italy	12 March	19	120
21st	2018	St. Gallen	Switzerland	7 April	20	124
Cancelled	2020	Marrakesh	Morocco			
22nd	2022	Aveiro	Portugal	12 March		
23rd	2024	Muscat, Oman	Oman	17–18 February		
24th	2026	Cassino, Italy	Italy	14–15 March		

== Medallists ==
=== Men's long race ===
Event	Gold		Silver		Bronze	
1968	Frank Briscoe (GBR)	?	John Rix (GBR)	?	?	?
1970	René Goris (BEL)	?	Georgi Tikhov (BUL)	?	Alistair Blamire (GBR)	?
1972	Jack Lane (GBR)	28:08	Andy Holden (GBR)	28:46	René Goris (BEL)	28:54
1974	Michael Karst (FRG)	24:38	Franco Fava (ITA)	24:44	Ian Gilmour (GBR)	24:55
1976	Laurie Reilly (GBR)	25:16	Vlastimil Zwiefelhofer (TCH)	25:16	Michael Lederer (FRG)	25:24
1978	Antonio Prieto (ESP)	30:38	Peter Baker (GBR)	30:56	Mehmet Yurdadön (TUR)	31:02
1980	David James (GBR)	33:57	Nick Brawn (GBR)	33:58	Michael Karst (FRG)	34:21
1982	Frank Zimmermann (FRG)	36:50	Christoph Herle (FRG)	37:04	Valeriy Gryaznov (URS)	37:45
1984	Michael Scheytt (FRG)	33:13	Gerhard Krippner (FRG)	33:29	Wiesław Furmanek (POL)	33:33
1986	Steve Moneghetti (AUS)	40:17	Lars Sörensen (FIN)	40:18	Jiu Shangxuan (CHN)	40:19
1988	Antonio Serrano (ESP)	24:29	Anacleto Jiménez (ESP)	24:38	Paolo Donati (ITA)	24:42
1990	Ian Hamer (GBR)	28:02	Antonio Serrano (ESP)	28:09	Haydar Dogan (TUR)	28:11
1992	Shaun Creighton (AUS)	32:22	Vítor Almeida (POR)	32:25	Bobby Quinn (GBR)	32:27
1994	Spencer Duval (GBR)	38:49	Piotr Gładki (POL)	38:51	Martin Jones (GBR)	39:02
1996	Daniel Njenga (KEN)	30:01	John Mitai Mborothi (KEN)	30:05	Bernard Lagat (KEN)	30:10
1998	Juan Puerta (ESP)	38:23	Iván Sánchez (ESP)	38:26	Mohamed Afaadas (MAR)	38:29
2000	Günther Weidlinger (AUT)	35:47	Aziz Driouche (MAR)	35:54	Rachid Boulahdid (MAR)	35:54
2002	Abdellah Bay (MAR)	35:01	Aziz Driouche (MAR)	35:03	Günther Weidlinger (AUT)	35:09
2004	Günther Weidlinger (AUT)	32:17	Karim El Mabchour (MAR)	32:26	Brahim Chettah (ALG)	32:39
2006	Mohamed Fadil (MAR)	27:59	Abdelkebir Lamachi (MAR)	28:10	Abdelaziz Azzouzi (MAR)	28:21
2008	Najim El Qady (MAR)	36:14	Liam Adams (AUS)	36:19	Stephan Hohl (GER)	36:24
2010	Tetsuya Yoroizaka (JPN)	30:08	Liam Adams (AUS)	30:09	Christian Glatting (GER)	30:11
2012	Abdelmadjed Touil (ALG)	29:11	Yuta Shitara (JPN)	29:15	Daichi Motomura (JPN)	29:22
2014	Joshua Cheptegei (UGA)	31:07	Daniel Muindi (KEN)	31:13	Mark Lokwanamoi (KEN)	32:34
2016	Hicham Amghar (MAR)	33:46	Reda Jaafar (MAR)	33:49	Youssef Ben Had (MAR)	33:51
2018	El Hocine Zourkane (ALG)	30:21	Rantso Alfred Mokopane (RSA)	30:30	Thamsanga Lukhanyo Theophilus Khonco (RSA)	30:33
2022	Dismas Yeko (UGA)	28:00	Markus Görger (GER)	28:07	Brian Wangwe (UGA)	28:12
2024	Seth Akampa (UGA)	29:12	Miguel Baidal Marco (ESP)	29:23	Baptiste Fourmont (FRA)	29:26
2026	Elisha Yeko (UGA)	30:27	Hiromisha Nonako (JAP)	30:36	Solomon Serotwo (UGA)	30:40

=== Men's team ===
Event	Gold		Silver		Bronze	
1968	Great Britain	13	Belgium	47	Italy	64
1970	Great Britain	?	Italy	?	Bulgaria	?
1972	Great Britain	12	Belgium	43	Switzerland	62
1974	Italy	24	West Germany	38	Great Britain	38
1976	Great Britain	37	Finland	43	West Germany	43
1978	Great Britain	29	West Germany	41	Spain	51
1980	Great Britain	13	West Germany	23	France	65
1982	Soviet Union	18	West Germany	26	Great Britain	53
1984	West Germany	20	Great Britain	52	Poland	57
1986	Soviet Union	37	China	43	Australia	69
1988	Spain	47	West Germany	50	Soviet Union	51
1990	Spain	30	Great Britain	46	Soviet Union	67
1992	Spain	35	Australia	38	Great Britain	58
1994	Great Britain	29	Spain	58	Italy	77
1996	Morocco	41	Kenya	45	South Africa	59
1998	Spain	17	Portugal	59	Great Britain	81
2000	Morocco	14	Great Britain	63	Spain	75
2002	Spain	32	Morocco	41	Great Britain	78
2004	Morocco	35	South Africa	36	Spain	46
2006	Morocco	10	Algeria	38	Spain	66
2008	France	38	Great Britain	61	Australia	66
2010	Japan	30	Spain	31	Great Britain	71
2012	Japan	36	Ukraine	57	Algeria	61
2014	Kenya	14	Uganda	29	Japan	47
2016	Morocco	10	Japan	31	Turkey	62
2018	South Africa	33	Japan	35	Morocco	40
2022	Morocco (MAR)	21	Uganda (UGA)	24	Germany (GER)	30
2024	Japan (JAP)	20	France (FRA)	22	Italy (ITA)	40
2026	Spain (SPA)	42	Italy (ITA)	65	France (FRA)	79

=== Women's long race ===
Event	Gold		Silver		Bronze	
1976	Vera Kemper (FRG)	14:09	Moira O'Boyle (GBR)	14:57	Caroline Simpson (GBR)	15:06
1978	Kathryn Binns (GBR)	17:50	Renate Kieninger (FRG)	17:58	Cherry Hanson (GBR)	18:05
1980	Jill Clarke (GBR)	22:34	Cherry Hanson (GBR)	22:42	Fionnuala Morrish (IRL)	22:54
1982	Yelena Tsukhlo (URS)	15:14	Valentina Ilyinykh (URS)	15:30	Marina Rodchenkova (URS)	15:44
1984	Asunción Sinovas (ESP)	16:41	Ute Jamrozy (FRG)	16:45	Zita Ágoston (HUN)	16:47
1986	Anne Viallix (FRA)	18:34	Krishna Wood (AUS)	18:35	Tatjana Smolnikar (YUG)	19:01
1988	Viorica Ghican (ROM)	18:42	Iulia Besliu (ROM)	18:48	Helen Titterington (GBR)	18:51
1990	Julia Vaquero (ESP)	15:44	Mónica Gama (POR)	16:00	Annette Hüls (FRG)	16:05
1992	Iulia Ionescu (ROM)	20:01	Vikki McPherson (GBR)	20:05	Irena Czuta (POL)	20:08
1994	Iulia Negura (ROM)	19:59	Silvia Sommaggio (ITA)	20:03	Julia Vaquero (ESP)	20:28
1996	Lelia Deselnicu (ROM)	20:45	María Abel (ESP)	20:49	Natalie Harvey (AUS)	20:50
1998	Natalie Harvey (AUS)	21:51	Céline Rajot (FRA)	22:03	Liz Talbot (GBR)	22:05
2000	Anália Rosa (POR)	20:03	Denisa Costescu (ROM)	20:06	Cristina Casandra (ROM)	20:10
2002	Denisa Costescu (ROM)	20:06	René Kalmer (RSA)	20:08	Inês Monteiro (POR)	20:13
2004	Mariem Alaoui Selsouli (MAR)	22:06	Louise Damen (GBR)	22:11	Sonia Bejarano (ESP)	22:16
2006	Souad Aït Salem (ALG)	18:54	Kate Reed (GBR)	19:04	Eleanor Baker (GBR)	19:33
2008	Faye Fullerton (GBR)	22:36	Fionnuala Britton (IRL)	22:39	Ikram Zouglali (MAR)	22:41
2010	Sara Moreira (POR)	16:29	Jessica Sparke (GBR)	16:41	Joanne Harvey (GBR)	16:48
2012	Ancuța Bobocel (ROM)	15:48	Carla Salomé Rocha (POR)	15:54	Roxana Bârcă (ROM)	15:56
2014	Winnie Nanyondo (UGA)	20:334	Dorcus Ajok (UGA)	21:02	Prim Twikiriza (UGA)	21:07
2016	Sevilay Eytemis (TUR)	21:57	Moeno Shimizu (JPN)	22:00	Maki Izumida (JPN)	22:01
2018	Catarina Granz (GER)	34:53	Rika Kaseda (JPN)	34:58	Soukaina Atanane (MAR)	35:13
2022	Izzy Fry (GBR)	31:53	Saskia Millard (GBR)	32:01	Yayla Günen (TUR)	32:14
2024	Maria Karabo Mailula (RSA)	34:03	Alice Goodall (GBR)	34:14	Haruka Ogawa (JAP)	34:22
2026	Lucia Arnoldo (ITA)	35:20	Nursena Ceto (GBR)	35:35	Amisa Murayama (JAP)	35:41

=== Women's team ===
Event	Gold		Silver		Bronze	
1976	Great Britain	9	Switzerland	25	Belgium	32
1978	Great Britain	9	West Germany	13	Belgium	31
1980	Great Britain	7	West Germany	27	Ireland	28
1982	Soviet Union	6	West Germany	23	Spain	33
1984	Spain	15	Great Britain	16	West Germany	23
1986	Great Britain	22	Yugoslavia	22	Soviet Union	32
1988	Romania	9	Spain	24	West Germany	36
1990	Spain	12	West Germany	25	Poland	35
1992	Great Britain	30	Spain	36	Romania	41
1994	Great Britain	18	France	31	Romania	35
1996	Spain	19	Romania	26	Italy	29
1998	Great Britain	13	South Africa	33	Spain	38
2000	South Africa	18	Romania	19	Spain	46
2002	South Africa	23	Spain	25	Romania	29
2004	Great Britain	14	Spain	18	Finland	37
2006	Great Britain	9	Algeria	29	Italy	30
2008	Great Britain	20	Australia	30	Ireland	33
2010	Great Britain	13	Australia	26	Canada	33
2012	Japan	21	Romania	23	Poland	45
2014	Uganda	6	Japan	15	Canada	38
2016	Japan	13	Great Britain	22	Italy	41
2018	Japan	17	Germany	49	Italy	51
2022	Great Britain (GBR)	8	Germany (GER)	25	Spain (ESP)	33
2024	Great Britain (GBR)	17	Italy (ITA)	26	Japan (JAP)	30
2026	Italy (ITA)	65	Spain (SPA)	69	Canada (CAN)	72

=== Men's short race ===
Event	Gold		Silver		Bronze	
2024	Keanu Cameron Domingo (RSA)	07:58	Christopher Liam Swart (RSA)	08:01	Adam Maijo Frigola (SPA)	08:01
2026	Oscar Thebaud (FRA)	08:39	Martín Segurola Larinaga (SPA)	08:41	Alejandro Quijada Sanchez (SPA)	08:44

=== Women's short race ===
Event	Gold		Silver		Bronze	
2024	Simonay Weitsz (RSA)	09:14	Marta Serrano (SPA)	09:17	Bethan Morley (GBR)	09:18
2026	Clara Entresangle (FRA)	09:46	Skye Ellis (AUS)	09:56	Marta Serrano (SPA)	09:58

=== Mixed long relay ===
Event	Gold		Silver		Bronze	
2022 (12K)	France (FRA); Alexa Lemitre; Benoit Campion; Bérénice Fulchiron; Quentin Malriq	35:02	Great Britain (GBR); Alexandra Millard; Edward Potter; Sabrina Sinha; Justin Davies	35:23	Spain (ESP); Marta Azpiazu; Pablo Sánchez; Mireya Lahoz; Alejandro Sánchez	35:31

=== Mixed short relay ===
Event	Gold		Silver		Bronze	
2026	Belgium (BEL); Lennert Dewulf; Marie Bilo; Matthias Loeys; Laure Bilo	19:05:00	Italy (ITA); Thomas Serafini; Melissa Fracassini; Konjoneh Maggi; Valeria Minati	19:05:01	Germany (GER); Tobias Tent; Katja Baurle; Felix Wittmann; Adia Budde	19:08:00

== See also ==
- Athletics at the Summer Universiade
