= João Pais =

Portuguese footballer (born 1998)

Personal information
- Full name: João Pedro Fernandes Pais
- Date of birth: 13 September 1998 (age 28)
- Place of birth: Coimbra, Portugal
- Height: 1.70 m (5 ft 7 in)
- Position: Midfielder

Team information
- Current team: Oliveira do Hospital

Youth career
- 2006–2016: Tourizense
- 2016–2017: Eirense

Senior career*
Years	Team	Apps	(Gls)
2016	Tourizense	0	(0)
2017–2018	Eirense	21	(3)
2018–2020	Mortágua	48	(10)
2020–	Vizela	3	(0)
2020–2021	→ Pedras Salgadas (loan)	10	(1)
2021–	→ Oliveira do Hospital (loan)	0	(0)
- * Club domestic league appearances and goals as of 5 September 2021

João Pedro Fernandes Pais (born 13 September 1998) is a Portuguese footballer who plays for Oliveira do Hospital on loan from Vizela as a midfieler.

== Football career ==
He made his professional debut for Vizela on 12 September 2020 in the Liga Portugal 2.

On 20 September 2021, he joined Oliveira do Hospital on loan.
