= Rúben Canedo =

Emirati footballer (born 2001)

Rúben Canedo روبن كانيدو
Personal information
- Full name: Rúben Filipe Canedo Amaral
- Date of birth: 19 October 2001 (age 25)
- Place of birth: Vila Nova de Gaia, Portugal
- Height: 1.68 m (5 ft 6 in)
- Position: Left-back

Team information
- Current team: Al Wahda
- Number: 19

Youth career
- 2009–2011: Candal
- 2011–2016: Porto
- 2016–2017: Padroense
- 2017–2020: Porto

Senior career*
Years	Team	Apps	(Gls)
2020–	Al Wahda	112	(5)

International career
2025–	United Arab Emirates	16	(0)
- * Club domestic league appearances and goals as of 09:37, 22 December 2025 (UTC)

Rúben Filipe Canedo Amaral (born 19 October 2001) is a professional footballer who plays as a left-back for Al Wahda. Born in Portugal, he plays for the United Arab Emirates national team.

== Club career ==
Canedo grew up in the youth academy of Porto, playing for them once in the UEFA Youth League in February 2020. In September 2020, he joined UAE Pro League side Al Wahda. On 21 November 2020, he made his professional league debut, playing 61 minutes in a 3–0 win over Ajman.

== International career ==
In July 2025, after five years in the country, Canedo was called up to United Arab Emirates senior squad for the first team for their summer training camp in Austria.

== Career statistics ==
=== Club ===
As of 29 November 2021

Appearances and goals by club, season and competition
Club	Season	League			Cup		Continental		Other		Total	
Club	Season	Division	Apps	Goals	Apps	Goals	Apps	Goals	Apps	Goals	Apps	Goals
Al Wahda	2020–21	UAE Pro League	17	0	0	0	0	0	0	0	17	0
Al Wahda	2021–22	UAE Pro League	5	0	2	0	0	0	0	0	7	0
Career total			22	0	2	0	0	0	0	0	24	0
