= Amelia Quirk =

British long-distance runner

- Quirk in 2026

Personal information
- Born: 18 December 1999 (age 26) Tameside, Greater Manchester, England

Sport
- Country: United Kingdom
- Sport: Long-distance running
Medal record
British Athletics Championships
Bronze medal – third place	2020 Manchester	5000 m
British Indoor Athletics Championships
Silver medal – second place	2022 Birmingham	3000 m

Amelia Quirk (born 18 December 1999) is a British long-distance runner. She competed in the senior women's race at the 2019 IAAF World Cross Country Championships held in Aarhus, Denmark. She finished in 79th place.

In 2017, she competed in the junior women's race at the IAAF World Cross Country Championships held in Kampala, Uganda. She did not finish her race.

In 2019, she competed in the women's 5000 metres event at the European Athletics U23 Championships held in Gävle, Sweden. She finished in 12th place. The following year, she won the bronze medal in the women's 5000 metres event at the 2020 British Athletics Championships held in Manchester, United Kingdom.

In 2021, she competed in the women's 3000 metres event at the European Athletics Indoor Championships held in Toruń, Poland.

She was selected for the British team for the European Road Running Championships in Leuven, Belgium, in April 2025. In the 10km race she finished in 33rd place overall, in a time of 32:55.
