= Hugh Armstrong (runner) =

Irish long-distance runner

Personal information
- Born: 20 September 1994 (age 31)

Sport
- Country: Ireland
- Sport: Athletics
- Event: Long-distance running

Hugh Armstrong (born 20 September 1994) is an Irish long-distance runner. He competed in the men's race at the 2020 World Athletics Half Marathon Championships held in Gdynia, Poland.
