= Nick Griggs =

Irish and Northern Irish athlete

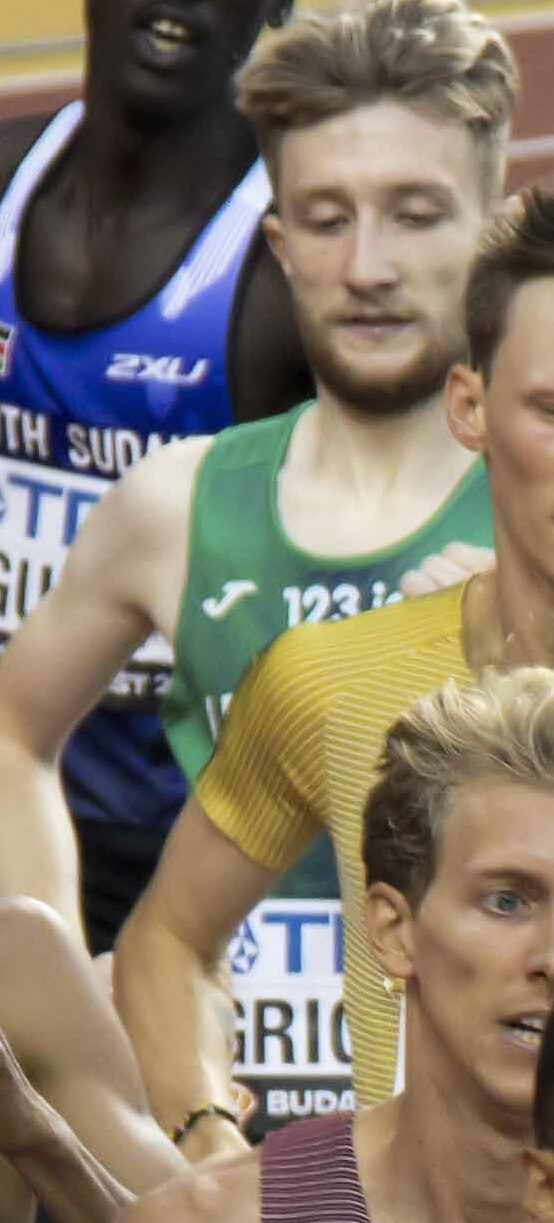
- Nick Griggs in 2023

Personal information
- Nationality: Irish
- Born: Nicholas Griggs; 18 December 2004 (age 21)

Sport
- Sport: Athletics
- Events: 1500m, 3000m, 5000m, Cross-country
Medal record
Men's athletics
Representing Ireland
European U23 Championships
Silver medal – second place	2025 Bergen	5000m
European U20 Championships
Gold medal – first place	2021 Tallinn	3000 m
Silver medal – second place	2023 Jerusalem	3000 m
European Cross Country Championships
Gold medal – first place	2025 Lagoa	U23 race
Gold medal – first place	2025 Lagoa	U23 team
Gold medal – first place	2023 Brussels	U20 team
Silver medal – second place	2024 Antalya	U23 race
Silver medal – second place	2021 Dublin	U20 team
Silver medal – second place	2022 Turin	U20 race
Silver medal – second place	2022 Turin	U20 team
Bronze medal – third place	2023 Brussels	U20 race

Nick Griggs (born 18 December 2004) is an Irish middle and long-distance runner who represents Ireland and Northern Ireland. He won the 3,000 metres at the 2026 Irish Indoor Athletics Championships and the U23 race at the 2025 European Cross Country Championships.

== Early and personal life ==
Nick Griggs was born on 18 December 2004 and is from Newmills, County Tyrone, He was head boy at Cookstown High School. He had an older brother, Josh, who died in an accident in 2021.

A keen Gaelic footballer, Griggs played for Brackaville Owen Roes GFC from the age of five. He set Irish U18 records, running 14:15.98 for 5,000 metres and winning the national U18 3,000 metres title in Santry in 8:11.15.

Griggs ran for Mid Ulster AC in County Tyrone before switching to the Candour Track Club in Belfast, where he is coached by Mark Kirk.

== Career ==
=== 2021 ===
Griggs won the 2021 European Athletics U20 Championships over 3, 000 metres in July 2021, Tallinn at the age of 16 years-old. Griggs won the 2021 Boys' U17 London Mini Marathon. He was a member of the Irish team which won the silver medal in the U20 men's team event at the 2021 European Cross Country Championships in Dublin in December 2021.

=== 2022 ===
In February 2022, he set new national U20 records in the 1,500 metres and 3,000 metres. He ran his first sub-four minute mile in March 2022 in Abbotstown, setting a new European U20 record at the same time.

In October 2022, Griggs ran the fastest ever parkrun recorded in Ireland. Aged 17 years-old, he ran a five kilometre course at Victoria Park, Belfast in 14:15. In December 2022 he won the silver medal in the U20 competition at the European Cross Country Championships in Turin.

=== 2023 ===
In January 2023, Griggs ran 7:54.44 for the 3,000 metres indoors, in Manchester. In February 2023, in Birmingham, Griggs lowered his own national U20 indoor record for the 1,500 metres to 3:39.94.

In May 2023, in Oordegem, Griggs clocked a time of 13.36.47 to set a new national U20 record over 5,000 metres. On 17 June 2023, he set new 1,500 metres best of 3:36.09, which was an Irish U20 outdoor record previously set by Ray Flynn in 1982. In July 2023, he set a new Ireland U20 records for the mile (3:55.73) in Dublin. He also set a new Irish U20 record for the 3,000 metres (7:53.24).

In August 2023, Griggs won the silver medal in the 3000 metres race at the European U20 Championships, held in Jerusalem. He was selected for the 1,500 metres at the 2023 World Athletics Championships.

In October 2023, Griggs finished third in the men's race at the Northern Ireland International Cross Country event in Belfast finishing behind Ethiopian Yohanes Asmare and Spaniard Ilias Fifa.

In December 2023, he won bronze in the 2023 European Cross Country Championships U20 individual race in Brussels, finishing behind Niels Laros and Axel Vang Christensen. His Irish team won gold in the U20 competition at the event.

=== 2024 ===
In January 2024, he ran a new personal best of 7:45.94 at the 3,000 metres indoors in Val de Reuil, France. He lowered it the following week in Metz, to 7:45.57, to claim the Irish U23 record from Darragh McElhinney.

In May 2024, he lowered his outdoor 1,500 metres personal best to 3:35.90 in Chorzów, which met the qualifying standard for the 2024 European Championships in Rome. He was selected for the Irish team for the 2024 European Athletics Championships.

In July 2024, he set a new personal best of 7:41.68 over 3,000 metres in Cork, and 13:13.07 personal best in the 5,000 metres at the Morton Games in Dublin. He lowered his 3,000 metres personal best to 7:36.59 at the London Athletics Meet on 20 July 2024.

In November 2024, he set a new world record for parkrun at the Victoria Park event, with a time of 13:44, one second faster than Andrew Butchart's June 2023 record. He won silver in the U23 race at the 2024 European Athletics Championship in Antalya, Turkey, with his Irish team finishing fourth overall.

=== 2025 ===
He won the silver medal in the 5,000 metres at the 2025 European Athletics U23 Championships in Bergen, Norway running a time of 13:45.80 to finish 0.31 ahead of Britain's Will Barnicoat, behind Niels Laros of the Netherlands. He was third behind Cathal Doyle and Andrew Coscoran in the 1,500 metres at the 2025 Irish Athletics Championships.

Griggs placed second behind Brian Fay at the senior Irish National Cross Country Championships held in Derry on 23 November 2025. He also won the under-23 race, and won the team prize with Candour Track Club. He won the U23 race and led Ireland alongside Callum Morgan and Niall Murphy to team gold at the 2025 European Cross Country Championships, in Portugal, on 14 December 2025.

=== 2026 ===
Competing at the New Balance Indoor Grand Prix in Boston on 24 January 2026, Griggs placed fourth over 3,000 metres in 7:32.79, breaking his own Irish U23 indoor record by almost 13 seconds and moved to second on the Irish indoor all-time list. The following week, Griggs improved his Irish U23 indoor 5,000 metres record, running 13:19.90 at the Boston Terrier Classic to move to third on the Irish all-time indoor list. On 1 March, Griggs won his first national senior title at the age of 21 year-old, winning the 3,000 metres in 8:14.52 at the Irish Indoor Athletics Championships. He was selected for the 3,000 metres at the 2026 World Athletics Indoor Championships in Toruń, Poland, in March 2026, placing ninth overall.

On 26 July, he placed third in the 1,500 metres at the Irish Championships. Griggs was named in the Northern Ireland team for the 2026 Commonwealth Games in Glasgow, where he placed sixth in the 5,000 metres race. Two weeks later, he finished in eighth place to be the fastest Irish finisher at the 2026 European Athletics Championships in Birmingham, England, in the 5,000 metres. This came despite running the final three laps with one bare foot after losing his right running shoe near the end of the race.

In October, it was announced that Griggs had signed with the University of Oregon. On his race debut for the Oregon Ducks he placed ninth at the 2026 NCAA Cross Country Championships in Indiana on 21 November, Oregon to fifth place in the team event.

== Personal bests ==
- 800 metres – 1:49.57 (Dublin 2023)
- 1500 metres – 3:35.90 (Chorzów 2024) NU20R
  - 1500 metres indoor – 3:39.94 (Birmingham 2023) NU20R
- Mile – 3:55.73 (Dublin 2023)
  - Mile indoor – 3:56.40 (Dublin 2022) NU20R
- 3000 metres – 7:36.59 (London 2024) NU20R
  - 3000 metres indoor – 7:32.79 (Boston 2026) NU23R
- 5000 metres – 13:13.07 (Dublin 2024) NU20R
  - 5000 metres Indoor - 13:19.90 (Boston 2026) NU23R
