= Adam Fogg =

British-Australian middle-distance runner

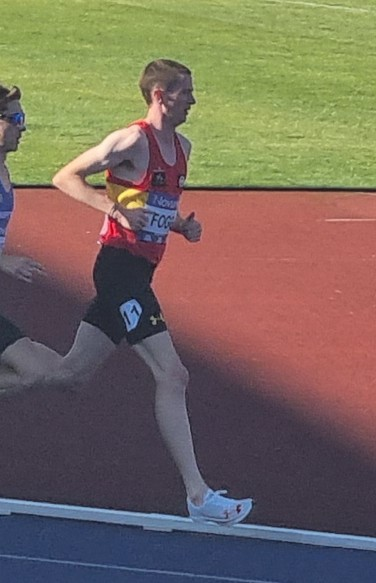
- 2025 UK Athletics Championships

Personal information
- Nationality: British-Australian
- Born: 27 January 1999 (age 27)

Sport
- Sport: Athletics
- Event(s): 1500m, Mile, 3000m
- University team: Drake Bulldogs
- Club: Coventry Godiva Harriers

Achievements and titles
- Personal bests: 1500m: 3:34.11 (London, 2025); Mile: 3:49.62i (New York, 2024); 3000m: 7:44.14i (Boston Uni, 2023)

Adam Fogg (born 27 January 1999) is a British-Australian middle-distance runner, who competes primarily over 1500 metres, the mile and 3000 metres.

== Biography ==
In 2021, Fogg finished fourth at the NCAA Division I Indoor Championships over the mile. In 2023, he was sixth over 3000 metres at the British Indoor Athletics Championships, and won the Emsley Carr Mile in the outdoor season. In the latter event, he set a British Milers Club members' record for the mile.

On 27 January 2024, in a time of 3:53.55, Fogg won the Invitational Men's mile at the Dr. Sander Invitational Columbia Challenge meet in New York. This qualified Fogg for the NYRR Wanamaker Mile at the Millrose Games. On 11 February 2024, Fogg came in 4th place in the Wanamaker Mile, breaking 3:50 in a time of 3:49.62. This time placed Fogg as 9th all-time for the indoor mile.
