= European Cross Country Championships =

International cross country running competition

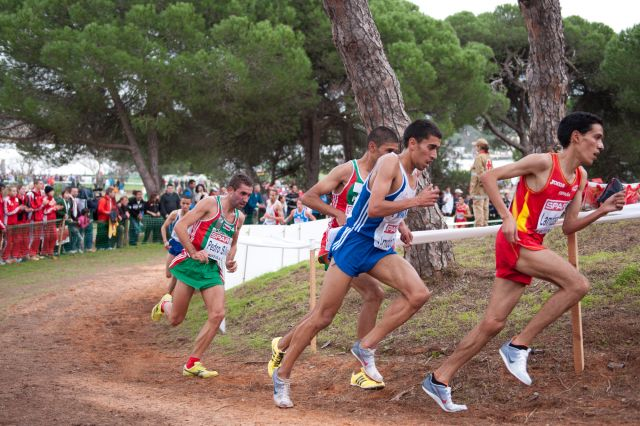
- Action from the men's race in 2010
- Status: active
- Genre: sports event
- Date: December
- Frequency: annual
- Location: various
- Inaugurated: 1994
- Organiser: EAA

The European Cross Country Championships is an annual international cross country running competition. Organised by the European Athletic Association, it is the area championships for the region and is held in December each year. The championships was inaugurated in 1994 in Alnwick and the venue for the championships changes each year.

Unlike the World Championships for the sport, the European Cross Country Championships consists of six races in age categories, with separate senior, under-23, and junior races for both men and women. There are individual and national team medals awarded in each race. In the team competition, the top three from a team of up to six are scored.

== History ==
The first edition of the competition featured only senior races and 180 athletes took part. Men's and women's junior (under-20) races were introduced at the third edition in 1996 and under-23 races were added to the programme in 2006.

== Editions ==
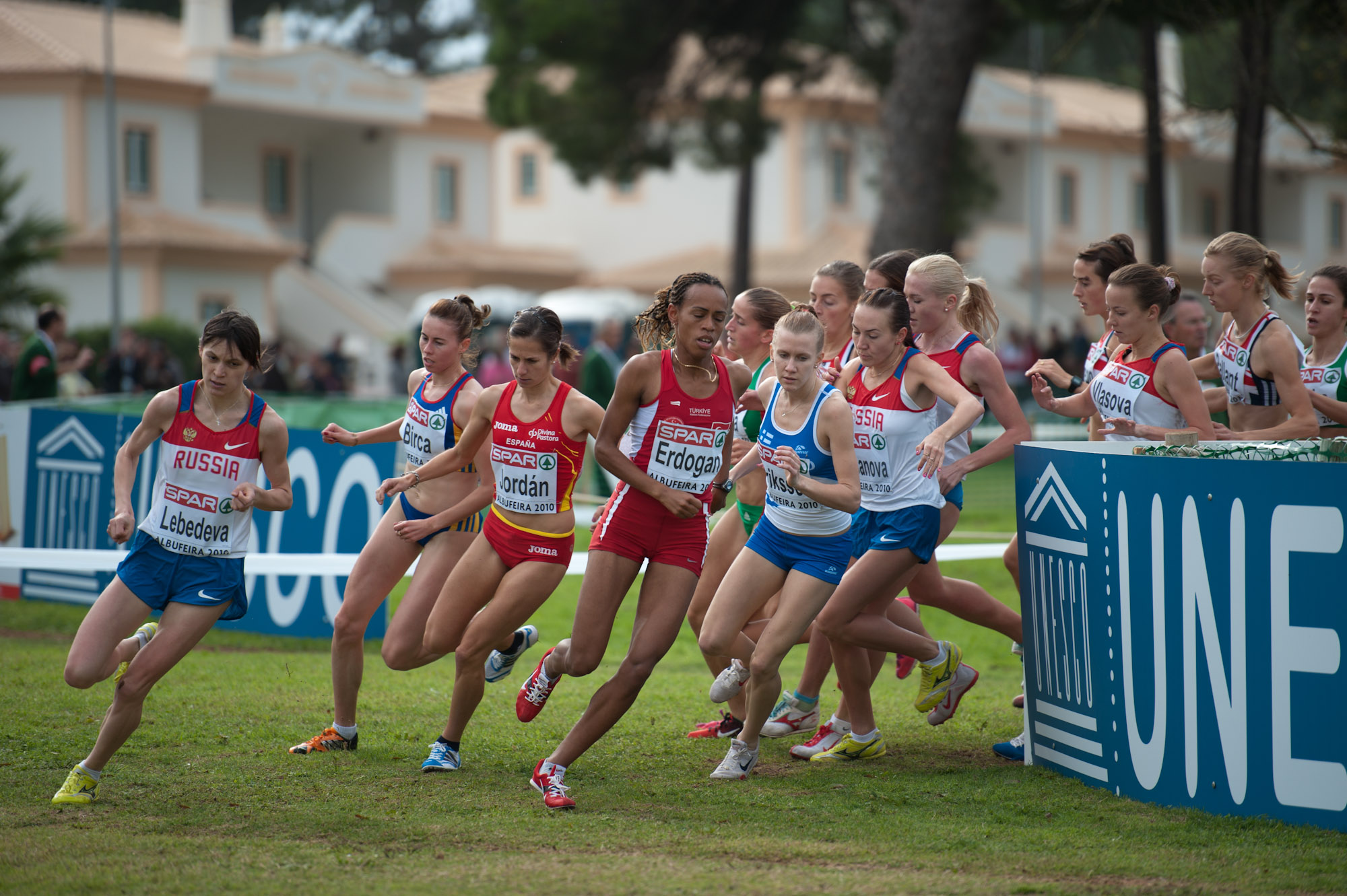
Women's competition

#	Year	Host	Host Country	Dates	Venue	Races Events	Countries	Athletes^{[nb]}	Events
Senior
1	1994	Alnwick	United Kingdom	10 December		2/4	23	180	4
2	1995	Alnwick	United Kingdom	2 December		2/4	23	186	4
3	1996	Charleroi	Belgium	15 December		2/4	25	175	4
Senior + U20
4	1997	Oeiras	Portugal	14 December		4/8	26	138	8
5	1998	Ferrara	Italy	13 December		4/8	26	139	8
6	1999	Velenje	Slovenia	12 December		4/8	27	141	8
7	2000	Malmö	Sweden	10 December		4/8	31	150	8
8	2001	Thun	Switzerland	9 December		4/8	27	155	8
9	2002	Medulin	Croatia	8 December		4/8	27	157	8
10	2003	Edinburgh	United Kingdom	14 December		4/8	27	135	8
11	2004	Heringsdorf	Germany	12 December		4/8	27	165	8
12	2005	Tilburg	Netherlands	11 December		4/8	27	164	8
Senior + U23 + U20
13	2006	San Giorgio su Legnano	Italy	10 December		6/12	21	125	12
14	2007	Toro	Spain	9 December		6/12	26	103	12
15	2008	Brussels	Belgium	14 December	Laeken Park	6/12	33	142	12
16	2009	Dublin	Ireland	13 December	Santry Demesne	6/12	30	116	12
17	2010	Albufeira	Portugal	12 December	Açoteias Cross Country Course	6/12	34	123	12
18	2011	Velenje	Slovenia	11 December		6/12	33	130	12
19	2012	Szentendre	Hungary	9 December		6/12	35	146	12
20	2013	Belgrade	Serbia	8 December		6/12	36	155	12
21	2014	Samokov	Bulgaria	14 December	Borovets	6/12	35	137	12
22	2015	Hyères-Toulon	France	13 December	Hippodrome de Hyères	6/12	32	147	12
23	2016	Chia	Italy	11 December		6/12		153	12
Senior + U23 + U20 + Mixed Relay
24	2017	Šamorín	Slovakia	10 December	Šamorín x-bionic® sphere	7/13	37	157	13
25	2018	Tilburg	Netherlands	9 December		7/13	38	555	13
26	2019	Lisbon	Portugal	8 December		7/13	40	606	13
	~~2020~~	Dublin	Ireland	13 December	Cancelled due to the COVID-19 pandemic.				
27	2021	Dublin	Ireland	12 December	National Sports Campus	7/13	37	606	13
28	2022	Turin	Italy	11 December	La Mandria Park	7/13	40	623	13
29	2023	Brussels	Belgium	10 December	Laeken Park	7/13			13
30	2024	Antalya	Turkey	8 December		7/13			13
31	2025	Lagoa	Portugal	14 December		7/13			13
32	2026	Belgrade	Serbia	13 December		7/13			
33	2027	Glasgow	United Kingdom	12 December	Bellahouston Park	7/13			

- ^{nb} Country and athlete figures for senior races only

== Medals (1994-2024) ==
Consist of all individual and team events in senior, U23 and U20.

Rank	Nation	Gold	Silver	Bronze	Total
1	Great Britain (GBR)	89	61	51	201
2	France (FRA)	35	38	37	110
3	Spain (ESP)	24	35	28	87
4	Turkey (TUR)	22	12	16	50
5	Portugal (POR)	19	20	20	59
6	Italy (ITA)	18	13	16	47
7	Russia (RUS)	17	24	16	57
8	Norway (NOR)	16	9	10	35
9	Ukraine (UKR)	11	3	7	21
10	Germany (GER)	9	16	24	49
11	Netherlands (NED)	9	8	5	22
12	Belgium (BEL)	7	10	11	28
13	Ireland (IRL)	7	10	10	27
14	Denmark (DEN)	5	2	4	11
15	Hungary (HUN)	5	1	1	7
16	Romania (ROU)	4	11	12	27
17	Poland (POL)	3	5	5	13
18	Sweden (SWE)	1	6	10	17
19	Serbia (SRB)	1	5	6	12
20	Switzerland (SUI)	1	4	1	6
21	Finland (FIN)	1	3	5	9
22	Yugoslavia (YUG)	1	2	6	9
23	Slovenia (SLO)	1	2	1	4
24	Latvia (LAT)	1	0	0	1
25	Bulgaria (BUL)	0	3	0	3
26	Belarus (BLR)	0	2	1	3
27	Austria (AUT)	0	1	1	2
28	Czech Republic (CZE)	0	1	0	1
29	Israel (ISR)	0	0	2	2
30	Luxembourg (LUX)	0	0	1	1
Totals (30 entries)		307	307	307	921

== Senior ==
=== Individual ===
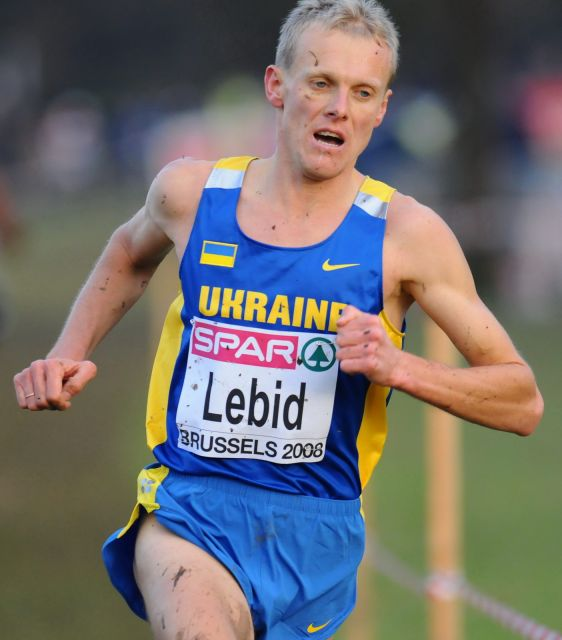
Multiple champion Serhiy Lebid winning in 2008

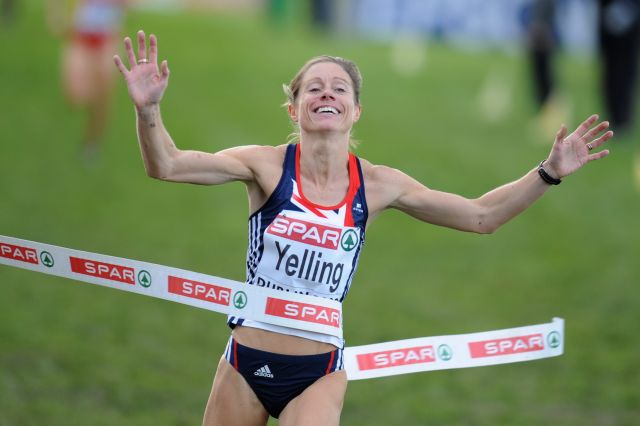
Hayley Yelling winning the 2009 women's race

Year	Men's senior race	Women's senior race
1994	Paulo Guerra (POR)	Catherina McKiernan (IRL)
1995	Paulo Guerra (POR)	Annemari Sandell (FIN)
1996	Jon Brown (GBR)	Sara Wedlund (SWE)
1997	Carsten Jørgensen (DEN)	Joalsiae Llado (FRA)
1998	Serhiy Lebid (UKR)	Paula Radcliffe (GBR)
1999	Paulo Guerra (POR)	Anita Weyermann (SUI)
2000	Paulo Guerra (POR)	Katalin Szentgyörgyi (HUN)
2001	Serhiy Lebid (UKR)	Yamna Belkacem (FRA)
2002	Serhiy Lebid (UKR)	Helena Javornik (SLO)
2003	Serhiy Lebid (UKR)	Paula Radcliffe (GBR)
2004	Serhiy Lebid (UKR)	Hayley Yelling (GBR)
2005	Serhiy Lebid (UKR)	Lornah Kiplagat (NED)
2006	Mo Farah (GBR)	Tetyana Holovchenko (UKR)
2007	Serhiy Lebid (UKR)	Marta Domínguez (ESP)
2008	Serhiy Lebid (UKR)	Hilda Kibet (NED)
2009	Alemayehu Bezabeh (ESP)	Hayley Yelling (GBR)
2010	Serhiy Lebid (UKR)	Jessica Augusto (POR)
2011	Atelaw Yeshetela (BEL)	Fionnuala Britton (IRL)
2012	Andrea Lalli (ITA)	Fionnuala Britton (IRL)
2013	Alemayehu Bezabeh (ESP)	Sophie Duarte (FRA)
2014	Polat Kemboi Arikan (TUR)	Gemma Steel (GBR)
2015	Ali Kaya (TUR)	Sifan Hassan (NED)
2016	Aras Kaya (TUR)	Yasemin Can (TUR)
2017	Kaan Kigen Özbilen (TUR)	Yasemin Can (TUR)
2018	Filip Ingebrigtsen (NOR)	Yasemin Can (TUR)
2019	Robel Fsiha (SWE)	Yasemin Can (TUR)
2021	Jakob Ingebrigtsen (NOR)	Karoline Grøvdal (NOR)
2022	Jakob Ingebrigtsen (NOR)	Karoline Grøvdal (NOR)
2023	Yann Schrub (FRA)	Karoline Grøvdal (NOR)
2024	Jakob Ingebrigtsen (NOR)	Nadia Battocletti (ITA)
2025	Thierry Ndikumwenayo (ESP)	Nadia Battocletti (ITA)

=== Medal table ===
Updated after 2019, including the team rankings for each category and the mixed relay.

#	Country	1st place, gold medalist(s)	2nd place, silver medalist(s)	3rd place, bronze medalist(s)	Total
1	Great Britain	19	21	15	55
2	Portugal	16	16	16	48
3	Spain	14	19	18	51
4	France	13	15	14	42
5	Turkey	13	7	4	24
6	Ukraine	10	1	3	14
7	Ireland	4	2	3	9
8	Netherlands	4	1	2	7
9	Russia	3	3	1	7
10	Italy	2	2	7	11
11	Sweden	1	4	4	9
12	Romania	1	6	3	10
13	Belgium	1	4	2	7
14	Norway	1	1	4	6
15	Finland	1	1	1	3
16	Switzerland	1	1	0	2
17	Hungary	1	0	1	2
18	Denmark	1	0	0	1
18	Slovenia	1	0	0	1
20	Germany	0	1	3	4
21	Belarus	0	1	1	2
21	Poland	0	1	1	2
23	Czech Republic	0	1	0	1
24	Serbia	0	0	5	5
Total (24 nations)		107	107	107	321

== Under 23 ==
=== Medal table ===
Rank	Nation	Gold	Silver	Bronze	Total
1	Great Britain	17	11	12	40
2	France	11	5	7	23
3	Russia	5	9	5	19
4	Turkey	4	0	4	8
5	Belgium	3	3	2	8
6	Netherlands	3	3	1	7
7	Germany	2	7	5	14
8	Italy	2	3	6	11
9	Norway	2	0	1	3
10	Denmark	2	0	0	2
11	Spain	1	5	3	9
12	Poland	1	2	4	7
13	Ireland	1	2	1	4
14	Hungary	1	0	0	1
14	Romania	1	0	0	1
16	Serbia	0	3	2	5
17	Bulgaria	0	2	0	2
18	Ukraine	0	1	1	2
19	Portugal	0	0	1	1
19	Sweden	0	0	1	1
Totals (20 entries)		56	56	56	168

Source: it:Campionati europei di corsa campestre#Under 23

== Under 20 ==
=== Men ===
Edition	Individual			Team		
Edition	1st place, gold medalist(s)	2nd place, silver medalist(s)	3rd place, bronze medalist(s)	1st place, gold medalist(s)	2nd place, silver medalist(s)	3rd place, bronze medalist(s)
1997	(Netherlands) Gert-Jan Liefers	(Austria) Günther Weidlinger	(Sweden) Mustafa Mohamed	Spain	Portugal	Romania
1998	(Spain) Yousef El Nasri	(Romania) Ovidiu Tat	(Republic of Ireland) Gareth Turnbull	Spain	United Kingdom	Romania
1999	(Belgium) Hans Janssens	(France) Guillaume Eraud	(Finland) Turo Inkiläinen	United Kingdom	France	Ireland
2000	(Germany) Wolfram Müller	(United Kingdom) Christopher Thompson	(Austria) Martin Pröll	Portugal	United Kingdom	France
2001	(Ukraine) Vasyl Matviychuk	(United Kingdom) Mo Farah	(Italy) Stefano Scaini	United Kingdom	Portugal	France
2002	(Russia) Yevgeniy Rybakov	(Russia) Anatoliy Rybakov	(Turkey) Halil Akkaş	Russia	France	Italy
2003	(Russia) Yevgeniy Rybakov	(Russia) Anatoliy Rybakov	(Russia) Aleksey Reunkov	Russia	Romania	Spain
2004	(Hungary) Barnabás Bene	(Russia) Yevgeniy Rybakov	(Russia) Anatoliy Rybakov	Russia	Ireland	United Kingdom
2005	(Hungary) Barnabás Bene	(United Kingdom) Andrew Vernon	(Serbia and Montenegro) Dušan Markešević	Poland	United Kingdom	Romania
2006	(Italy) Andrea Lalli	(Belarus) Siarhei Chebiarak	(Romania) Ciprian Suhanea	Italy	Spain	France
2007	(France) Mourad Amdouni	(France) Florian Carvalho	(Ukraine) Dmytro Lashyn	France	United Kingdom	Germany
2008	(France) Florian Carvalho	(Norway) Sondre Nordstad Moen	(France) Hassan Chahdi	France	Norway	United Kingdom
2009	(Belgium) Jeroen D'Hoedt	(United Kingdom) Nick Goolab	(United Kingdom) James Wilkinson	United Kingdom	France	Norway
2010	(Spain) Abdelaziz Merzougui	(Serbia) Nemanja Cerovac	(Portugal) Rui Pinto	United Kingdom	Portugal	Russia
2011	(Russia) Ilgizar Safiullin	(United Kingdom) Richard Goodman	(Russia) Vladimir Nikitin	United Kingdom	Russia	France
2012	(Poland) Szymon Kulka	(Bulgaria) Mitko Tsenov	(United Kingdom) Kieran Clements	Russia	France	United Kingdom
2013	(Turkey) Ali Kaya	(Belgium) Isaac Kimeli	(Russia) Mikhail Strelkov	France	Russia	Italy
2014	(Italy) Yemaneberhan Crippa	(Spain) Carlos Mayo	(Italy) Said Ettaqy	Italy	Spain	Turkey
2015	(Italy) Yemaneberhan Crippa	(France) Fabien Palcau	(Spain) El Madhi Lahoufi	France	Italy	United Kingdom
2016	(Norway) Jakob Ingebrigtsen	(Italy) Yohanes Chiappinelli	(United Kingdom) Mahamed Mahamed	France	Spain	United Kingdom
2017	(Norway) Jakob Ingebrigtsen	(Turkey) Ramazan Barbaros	(France) Louis Gilavert	Spain	France	Turkey
2018	(Norway) Jakob Ingebrigtsen	(Spain) Ouassim Oumaiz	(Serbia) Elzan Bibić	Norway	United Kingdom	Germany
2019	(Norway) Jakob Ingebrigtsen	(Turkey) Ayetullah Aslanhan	(Republic of Ireland) Efrem Gidey	United Kingdom	Norway	Portugal
2020	Cancelled due to the COVID-19 pandemic					
2021	(Denmark) Axel Vang Christensen	(Norway) Abdullahi Dahir Rabi	(Denmark) Joel Ibler Lillesø	United Kingdom	Ireland	Israel
2022	(United Kingdom) Will Barnicoat	(Republic of Ireland) Nick Griggs	(Republic of Ireland) Dean Casey	United Kingdom	Ireland	Spain
2023	(Denmark) Axel Vang Christensen	(Netherlands) Niels Laros	(Republic of Ireland) Nick Griggs	Ireland	United Kingdom	Spain
2024	(Netherlands) Niels Laros	(United Kingdom) George Couttie	(Norway) Andreas Fjeld Halvorsen	Norway	Netherlands	France
2025	(Belgium) Willem Renders	(Spain) Oscar Gaitan	(France) Alois Abraham	Belgium	United Kingdom	Spain

=== Women ===
Edition	Individual			Team		
Edition	1st place, gold medalist(s)	2nd place, silver medalist(s)	3rd place, bronze medalist(s)	1st place, gold medalist(s)	2nd place, silver medalist(s)	3rd place, bronze medalist(s)
1997	(Serbia and Montenegro) Sonja Stolić	(Portugal) Monica Rosa	(Germany) Judith Heise	Germany	Serbia and Montenegro	United Kingdom
1998	(Hungary) Katalin Szentgyörgyi	(Portugal) Inês Monteiro	(Serbia and Montenegro) Sonja Stolić	Turkey	Belgium	Romania
1999	(Portugal) Inês Monteiro	(Switzerland) Nicola Spirig	(Romania) Ane Marie Moutsinga	Turkey	Portugal	Belgium
2000	(Portugal) Jessica Augusto	(Switzerland) Nicola Spirig	(Turkey) Elvan Can	United Kingdom	Turkey	Sweden
2001	(Turkey) Elvan Abeylegesse	(Russia) Tatyana Chulakh	(Serbia and Montenegro) Snezana Kostić	Russia	United Kingdom	Turkey
2002	(United Kingdom) Charlotte Dale	(Finland) Elina Lindgren	(Russia) Galina Yegorova	United Kingdom	Russia	Belgium
2003	(Latvia) Inna Poluškina	(Serbia and Montenegro) Snežana Kostić	(United Kingdom) Charlotte Dale	United Kingdom	Russia	Germany
2004	(Turkey) Binnaz Uslu	(Romania) Ancuţa Bobocel	(Spain) Marta Romo	Romania	United Kingdom	Russia
2005	(Romania) Ancuţa Bobocel	(United Kingdom) Emily Pidgeon	(Netherlands) Susan Kuijken	United Kingdom	Romania	Russia
2006	(United Kingdom) Stephanie Twell	(Norway) Karoline Bjerkeli Grovdal	(Romania) Ancuţa Bobocel	United Kingdom	Russia	Romania
2007	(United Kingdom) Stephanie Twell	(Poland) Danuta Urbanik	(United Kingdom) Charlotte Purdue	United Kingdom	Russia	Ukraine
2008	(United Kingdom) Stephanie Twell	(United Kingdom) Charlotte Purdue	(United Kingdom) Lauren Howarth	United Kingdom	Ukraine	Russia
2009	(Norway) Karoline Grøvdal	(Russia) Gulshat Fazlitdinova	(United Kingdom) Kate Avery	Russia	United Kingdom	Germany
2010	(United Kingdom) Charlotte Purdue	(Serbia) Amela Terzić	(United Kingdom) Emelia Gorecka	United Kingdom	Germany	Romania
2011	(United Kingdom) Emelia Gorecka	(Romania) Ioana Doaga	(Serbia) Amela Terzić	United Kingdom	Russia	Germany
2012	(Serbia) Amela Terzić	(United Kingdom) Emelia Gorecka	(Germany) Maya Rehberg	United Kingdom	Germany	Russia
2013	(United Kingdom) Emelia Gorecka	(Poland) Sofia Ennaoui	(Slovenia) Maruša Mišmaš	United Kingdom	Sweden	Germany
2014	(Turkey) Emine Hatun Tuna	(United Kingdom) Jessica Judd	(United Kingdom) Lydia Turner	United Kingdom	France	Germany
2015	(Germany) Konstanze Klosterhalfen	(United Kingdom) Harriet Knowles-Jones	(Germany) Alina Reh	Germany	United Kingdom	Denmark
2016	(Germany) Konstanze Klosterhalfen	(Denmark) Anna Emilie Møller	(United Kingdom) Harriet Knowles-Jones	United Kingdom	Germany	Netherlands
2017	(United Kingdom) Harriet Knowles-Jones	(Hungary) Lili Tóth	(Germany) Miriam Dattke	United Kingdom	Italy	Spain
2018	(Italy) Nadia Battocletti	(Switzerland) Delia Sclabas	(Turkey) İnci Kalkan	United Kingdom	Netherlands	Turkey
2019	(Italy) Nadia Battocletti	(Slovenia) Klara Lukan	(Portugal) Mariana Machado	United Kingdom	Italy	France
2020	Cancelled due to the COVID-19 pandemic					
2021	(United Kingdom) Megan Keith	(Norway) Ingeborg Østgård	(Germany) Emma Heckel	Italy	France	United Kingdom
2022	(Spain) María Forero	(Norway) Ingeborg Østgård	(Finland) Ilona Mononen	Spain	Turkey	Germany
2023	(United Kingdom) Innes FitzGerald	(Denmark) Sofia Thøgersen	(France) Jade Le Corre	United Kingdom	Germany	Sweden
2024	(United Kingdom) Innes FitzGerald	(United Kingdom) Jess Bailey	(Denmark) Sofia Thøgersen	United Kingdom	France	Italy
2025	(United Kingdom) Innes FitzGerald	(France) Lucie Paturel	(Republic of Ireland) Emma Hickey	United Kingdom	Spain	Sweden

=== Medal table ===
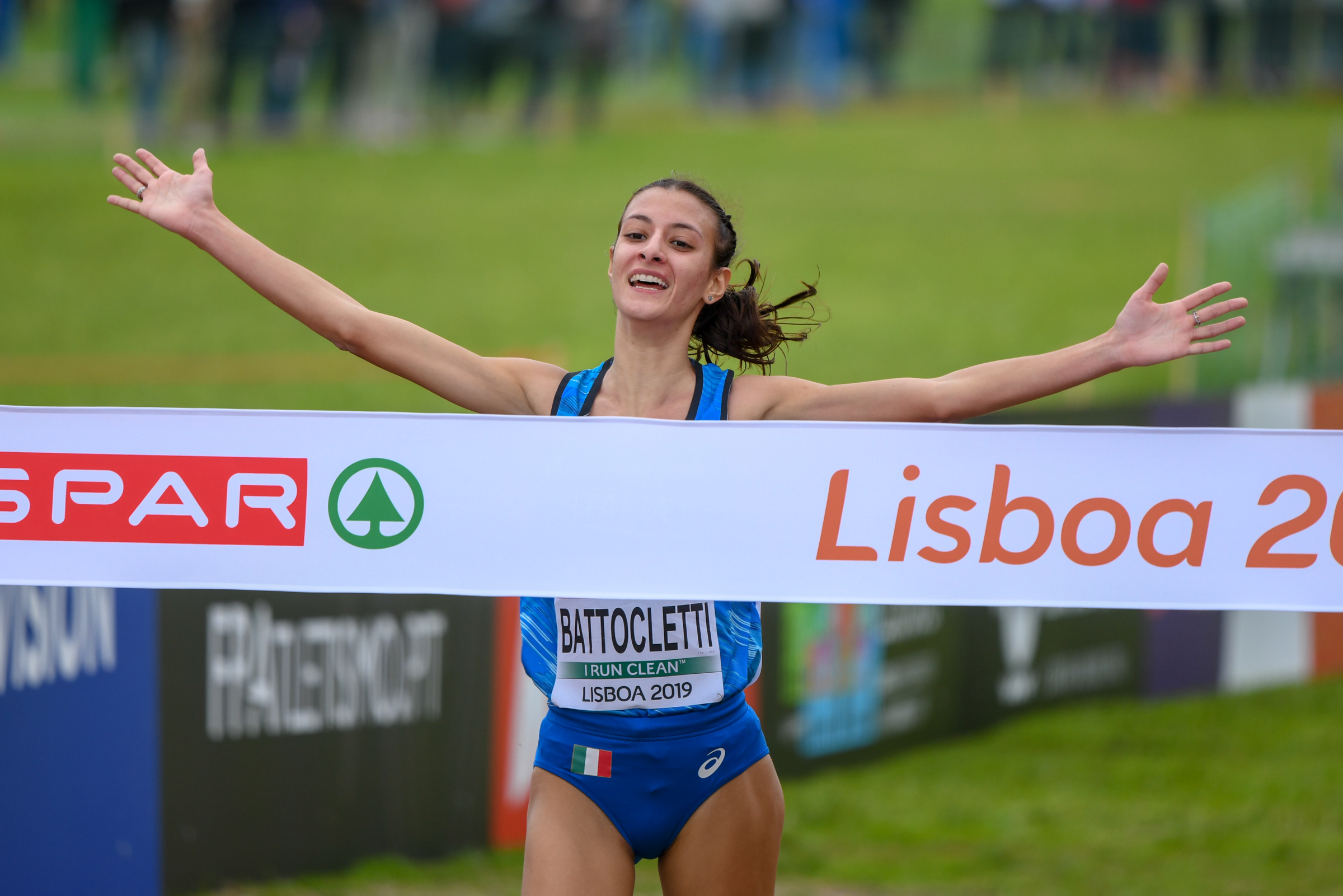
Nadia Battocletti (Italy, pictured in 2019) won the Under-20 female race twice.

Rank	Nation	Gold	Silver	Bronze	Total
1	Great Britain	30	18	16	64
2	Russia	9	12	10	31
3	France	7	9	7	23
4	Italy	7	4	4	15
5	Norway	6	4	1	11
6	Turkey	6	3	7	16
7	Spain	5	5	4	14
8	Germany	5	3	11	19
9	Portugal	3	6	3	12
10	Hungary	3	1	0	4
11	Romania	2	5	9	16
12	Serbia	2	4	5	11
13	Belgium	2	2	2	6
14	Poland	2	2	0	4
15	Netherlands	1	1	2	4
15	Ukraine	1	1	2	4
17	Latvia	1	0	0	1
18	Switzerland	0	3	0	3
19	Sweden	0	2	2	4
20	Austria	0	2	1	3
21	Ireland	0	1	3	4
22	Denmark	0	1	1	2
22	Finland	0	1	1	2
22	Slovenia	0	1	1	2
25	Belarus	0	1	0	1
Totals (25 entries)		92	92	92	276
