= Isobelle Jones =

British athlete (born 2007)

Personal information
- Born: 3 April 2007 (age 19)

Sport
- Sport: Athletics
- Event(s): Middle-distance running, Cross country running

Achievements and titles
- Personal best(s): 1500m: 4:16.18 (Tampere, 2025); Mile 4:47.38 (Loughborough,,2025); 3000m: 9:29.90 (Birmingham, 2023)
Medal record
Women's athletics
Representing Great Britain
European Athletics U20 Championships
Bronze medal – third place	2025 Tampere	1500 m

Isobelle Jones (born 3 April 2007) is a British middle-distance and cross country runner. She was a bronze medalist in the 1500 metres at the 2025 European Athletics U20 Championships.

== Biography ==
She is a member of Wolverhampton & Bilston Athletics Club in the West Midlands. She made her debut for Team England in cross country as part of the victorious England women's junior team in January 2024 at the London International country event at Parliament Hill, alongside Innes Fitzgerald, Eliza Nicholson, and Jess Bailey, also placing ninth in the individual race. In December 2024, she ran for Great Britain at the 2024 European Cross Country Championships in Antalya, Turkey as part of the U20 women's team alongside FitzGerlad, Bailey, Eleanor Strevens and Zoe Gilbody.

In 2025, she was selected to represent England U20 at the Hannut CrossCup. The following month, in February 2025, she won in the junior women's race ahead of Eliza Nicholson at the Belgium Cross Cup, a World Athletics World Tour Gold Event.

She won the silver medal on the track in the Senior Girls 1500 meters race at the English Schools Championships in Birmingham in July 2025, with a time of 4:25.60. Later that month she was named as part of the British team for the 1500 metres at the 2025 European Athletics U20 Championships in Tampere, Finland. At the Championships, she came through her preliminary heats for the final with a second place finish, and subsequently won the bronze medal in the final behind her gold medal winning British compatriot Lyla Belshaw, running a personal best time of 4:16.18.
