= 2024 European Cross Country Championships =

- Organisers: EAA
- Edition: 30th
- Date: 8 December
- Host city: Antalya, Turkey
- Venue: Dokumapark
- Events: 7
- Distances: ~7.5 km – Men; ~7.5 km – Women; ~6 km – U23 men ~6 km – U23 women ~4.5 km – U20 men ~4.5 km – U20 women ~4 x 1.5 km – Mixed relay
- Official website: Antalya 2024

The 2024 European Cross Country Championships was the 30th edition of the cross country running competition for European athletes. It was held on 8 December 2024 in Antalya, Turkey.

This was the first time Turkey has staged the European Cross Country Championships and Antalya became the southernmost venue in the 30-year history of the championships.

== Medal table ==
* Host nation (Turkey)

Rank	Nation	Gold	Silver	Bronze	Total
1	Great Britain (GBR)	6	3	3	12
2	Italy (ITA)	3	1	1	5
3	Norway (NOR)	2	0	1	3
4	Spain (ESP)	1	1	1	3
5	Netherlands (NED)	1	1	0	2
6	France (FRA)	0	3	1	4
7	Belgium (BEL)	0	1	1	2
7	Germany (GER)	0	1	1	2
7	Turkey (TUR)*	0	1	1	2
10	Ireland (IRL)	0	1	0	1
11	Denmark (DEN)	0	0	2	2
12	Finland (FIN)	0	0	1	1
Totals (12 entries)		13	13	13	39

== Medal summary ==
Event	Gold		Silver		Bronze	
Individual
Senior men	Jakob Ingebrigtsen; Norway	22:16	Yemaneberhan Crippa; Italy	22:24	Thierry Ndikumwenayo; Spain	22:31
Senior women	Nadia Battocletti; Italy	25:43	Konstanze Klosterhalfen; Germany	25:54	Yasemin Can; Turkey	26:01
U23 men	Will Barnicoat; Great Britain	18:27	Nicholas Griggs; Ireland	18:28	David Stone; Great Britain	18:31
U23 women	Phoebe Anderson; Great Britain	21:16	Maria Forero; Spain	21:21	Ilona Mononen; Finland	21:24
U20 men	Niels Laros; Netherlands	14:07	George Couttie; Great Britain	14:09	Andreas Fjeld Halvorsen; Norway	14:16
U20 women	Innes FitzGerald; Great Britain	15:47	Jess Bailey; Great Britain	15:58	Sofia Thøgersen; Denmark	16:03
Team
Senior men's team	Spain (ESP); Thierry Ndikumwenayo; Nassim Hassaous; Abdessamad Oukhelfen; Adel Mechaal; Aarón Las Heras; Fernando Carro	18 pts (3+7+8)	Belgium (BEL); Isaac Kimeli; John Heymans; Robin Hendrix; Nicolaï Saké	37 pts (4+15+18)	Great Britain (GBR); Rory Leonard; Hugo Milner; Tomer Tarragano; Ellis Cross; Zakariya Mahamed	39 pts (9+11+19)
Senior women's team	Italy (ITA); Nadia Battocletti; Elisa Palmero; Ludovica Cavalli; Svetlana Reina; Valentina Gemetto; Federica Del Buono	33 pts (1+13+19)	Great Britain (GBR); Kate Axford; Jessica Gibbon; Izzy Fry; Abbie Donnelly; Poppy Tank; Cari Hughes	36 pts (10+12+14)	Belgium (BEL); Jana Van Lent; Lisa Rooms; Victoria Warpy; Roxane Cleppe	46 pts (5+18+23)
U23 men's team	Great Britain (GBR); Will Barnicoat; David Stone; Brett Rushman; James Kingston; Peter Molloy; Dafydd Jones	17 pts (1+3+13)	France (FRA); Luc Le Baron; Pierre Boudy; Martin Perrin; Aurélien Radja; Edouard Morin-Luzuy	24 pts (5+9+10)	Denmark (DEN); Joel Lillesø; Axel Christensen; Elias Shifris; Gustav Bendsen	42 pts (7+17+18)
U23 women's team	Great Britain (GBR); Phoebe Anderson; Mia Waldmann; Tia Wilson; Kate Willis; Megan Gadsby; Poppy Craig-McFeely	24 pts (1+6+17)	Turkey (TUR); Pelinsu Şahin; Esmanur Yilmaz; Sila Bayir; Nursena Çeto; Urkuş Işik; Merve Karakaya	38 pts (8+14+16)	Germany (GER); Pia Schlattmann; Blanka Dörfel; Mia Jurenka	40 pts (4+10+26)
U20 men's team	Norway (NOR); Andreas Fjeld Halvorsen; Magnus Øyen; Kristian Bråthen Børve; Åsmund Førde	17 pts (3+4+10)	Netherlands (NED); Niels Laros; Juan Zijderlaan; Nathan Houwaard; Jochem Wiersma	20 pts (1+8+11)	France (FRA); Ishak Dahmani; Leni Mancini; Mael Henric; Joshua Abraham; Bilal Safadi	40 pts (6+14+20)
U20 women's team	Great Britain (GBR); Innes FitzGerald; Jess Bailey; Eleanor Strevens; Zoe Gilbody; Lizzie Wellsted; Isobelle Jones	9 pts (1+2+6)	France (FRA); Jade Le Corre; Margot Dajoux; Lili-Meije Delaunay-Foglino; Noreen Sdour; Laly Porentru	39 pts (5+9+25)	Italy (ITA); Lucia Arnoldo; Laura Ribigini; Licia Ferrari; Chiara Munaretto; Alice Brusin; Elisa Clementi	44 pts (12+15+17)
Relay
Mixed relay	Italy (ITA); Sebastiano Parolini; Marta Zenoni; Sintayehu Vissa; Pietro Arese	18:02	France (FRA); Antoine Senard; Emilie Girard; Agathe Guillemot; Simon Bedard	18:02	Great Britain (GBR); Joshua Lay; Maddie Deadman; Elise Thorner; Tyler Bilyard	18:02

- Note: Athletes in italics did not score for the team result.

== Results ==
=== Senior men ===
Individual race
Rank	Athlete	Country	Time (m:s)
1st place, gold medalist(s)	Jakob Ingebrigtsen	Norway	22:16
2nd place, silver medalist(s)	Yemaneberhan Crippa	Italy	22:24
3rd place, bronze medalist(s)	Thierry Ndikumwenayo	Spain	22:31
4	Isaac Kimeli	Belgium	22:33
5	Andreas Almgren	Sweden	22:34
6	Yann Schrub	France	22:35
7	Nassim Hassaous	Spain	22:44
8	Abdessamad Oukhelfen	Spain	22:45
9	Rory Leonard	Great Britain	22:45
10	Adel Mechaal	Spain	22:47
11	Hugo Milner	Great Britain	22:48
12	Valentin Gondouin	France	22:49
13	Miguel Moreira	Portugal	22:51
14	Aarón Las Heras	Spain	22:51
15	John Heymans	Belgium	22:51
16	Simon Sundström	Sweden	22:52
17	Markus Görger	Germany	22:53
18	Robin Hendrix	Belgium	22:57
19	Tomer Tarragano	Great Britain	22:58
20	Filip Ingebrigtsen	Norway	22:59
21	Cormac Dalton	Ireland	23:03
22	Alexis Miellet	France	23:04
23	Davor Aaron Bienenfeld	Germany	23:04
24	Ruben Querinjean	Luxembourg	23:06
25	Ellis Cross	Great Britain	23:07
26	Efrem Gidey	Ireland	23:08
27	Kasper Fosser	Norway	23:09
28	Nik Lemmink	Netherlands	23:10
29	Jacob Boutera	Norway	23:12
30	Bastien Augusto	France	23:14
31	Jonas Glans	Sweden	23:16
32	Jacob Sommer Simonsen	Denmark	23:17
33	Donovan Christien	France	23:18
34	Nicolaï Saké	Belgium	23:18
35	Abdullah Tuğluk	Turkey	23:19
36	Andreas Bock Bjørnsen	Denmark	23:20
37	Oliver Löfqvist	Sweden	23:20
38	Fernando Carro	Spain	23:21
39	Filimon Abraham	Germany	23:21
40	Luca Alfieri	Italy	23:21
41	Pierre Murchan	Ireland	23:26
42	Zakariya Mahamed	Great Britain	23:29
43	André Pereira	Portugal	23:31
44	Martin Regborn	Sweden	23:32
45	Peter Ďurec	Slovakia	23:32
46	Leo Magnusson	Sweden	23:34
47	Baldvin Magnusson	Iceland	23:36
48	Nick Jäger	Germany	23:37
49	Fredrik Sandvik	Norway	23:37
50	Tobias Rattinger	Austria	23:38
51	Simas Bertašius	Lithuania	23:39
52	Jonas Gertsen	Denmark	23:40
53	Keelan Kilrehill	Ireland	23:40
54	William Fitzgerald	Ireland	23:42
55	Jacopo de Marchi	Italy	23:51
56	Roman Rostikus	Ukraine	23:52
57	Mikael Johnsen	Denmark	23:53
58	Uģis Jocis	Latvia	23:54
59	Etson Barros	Portugal	23:56
60	Magnus Tuv Myhre	Norway	23:56
61	Ayetullah Aslanhan	Turkey	24:00
62	Joao Pereira	Portugal	24:02
63	Seán Tobin	Ireland	24:02
64	David Nikolli	Albania	24:06
65	Leonid Latsepov	Estonia	24:08
66	Dmitrijs Serjogins	Latvia	24:10
67	Abdirahman Mohamed	Netherlands	24:13
68	Nuno Pereira	Portugal	24:16
69	Jáchym Kovář	Czech Republic	24:23
70	Rúben Amaral	Portugal	24:24
71	István Szögi	Hungary	24:24
72	Luke Micallef	Malta	24:25
73	Jan Kokalj	Slovenia	24:27
74	Kiruhura Emmanuel Ntagunga	ART	24:28
75	Niko Putkinen	Finland	24:29
76	Ramazan Özdemir	Turkey	24:33
77	Karel Hussar	Estonia	24:39
78	Enrico Vecchi	Italy	24:42
79	Maxim Răileanu	Moldova	24:44
80	Murat Emektar	Turkey	24:44
81	Deniss Šalkauskas	Estonia	24:44
82	Mehmet Kalyoncu	Turkey	24:45
83	István Palkovits	Hungary	24:55
84	Jeppe Risvig	Denmark	25:01
85	Yiğit Dilaver Eker	Turkey	25:02
86	Giorgos Tofi	Cyprus	25:12
87	Marco Fontana Granotto	Italy	25:45
88	Bakhtiyar Asgarli	Azerbaijan	25:52
89	Andreas Vojta	Austria	27:23
	Andrew Lee Jefferies-Mor	Gibraltar	LAP
	Arnold Rogers	Gibraltar	LAP
	Colin Mark Thompson	Gibraltar	LAP
	Maurice Turnock	Gibraltar	LAP
	Scott Beattie	Great Britain	DNS

Team race
Rank	Team	Points
1st place, gold medalist(s)	Spain; Thierry Ndikumwenayo; Nassim Hassaous; Abdessamad Oukhelfen; Adel Mechaal; Aarón Las Heras; Fernando Carro	18 pts (3+7+8)
2nd place, silver medalist(s)	Belgium; Isaac Kimeli; John Heymans; Robin Hendrix; Nicolaï Saké	37 pts (4+15+18)
3rd place, bronze medalist(s)	Great Britain; Rory Leonard; Hugo Milner; Tomer Tarragano; Ellis Cross; Zakariya Mahamad; Beattie Scott	39 pts (9+11+19)
4	France; Yann Schrub; Valentin Gondouin; Alexis Miellet; Bastien Augusto; Christien Donovan	40 pts (6+12+22)
5	Norway; Jakob Ingebrigtsen; Filip Ingebrigtsen; Kasper Fosser; Jacob Boutera; Fredrik Sandvik; Magnus Tuv Myhre	48 pts (1+20+27)
6	Sweden; Andreas Almgren; Simon Sundström; Jonas Glans; Oliver Löfqvist; Martin Regborn; Leo Magnusson	52 pts (5+16+31)
7	Germany; Markus Görger; Davor Aaron Bienenfeld; Filimon Abraham; Nick Jäger	79 pts (17+23+39)
8	Ireland; Cormac Dalton; Efrem Gidey; Pierre Murchan; Keelan Kilrehill; William Fitzgerald; Seán Tobin	88 pts (21+26+41)
9	Italy; Yemaneberhan Crippa; Luca Alfieri; Jacopo de Marchi; Enrico Vecchi; Marco Fontana Granotto	97 pts (2+40+55)
10	Portugal; Miguel Moreira; André Pereira; Etson Barros; João Pereira; Nuno Pereira; Rúben Amaral	115 pts (13+43+59)
11	Denmark; Jacob Sommer Simonsen; Andreas Bock Bjørnsen; Jonas Gertsen; Mikael Johnsen; Jeppe Risvig	120 pts (32+36+52)
12	Turkey; Abdullah Tuğluk; Ayetullah Aslanhan; Ramazan Özdemir; Murat Emektar; Mehmet Kalyoncu; Yiğit Dilaver Eker	172 pts (35+61+76)
13	Estonia; Leonid Latsepov; Karel Hussar; Deniss Šalkauskas	223 pts (65+77+81)
	Gibraltar; Andrew Lee Jefferies-Mor; Arnold Rogers; Colin Mark Thompson; Maurice Turnock	NM

=== Senior women ===
Individual race
Rank	Athlete	Country	Time (m:s)
1st place, gold medalist(s)	Nadia Battocletti	Italy	25:43
2nd place, silver medalist(s)	Konstanze Klosterhalfen	Germany	25:54
3rd place, bronze medalist(s)	Yasemin Can	Turkey	26:01
4	Delvine Relin Meringor	Romania	26:03
5	Jana Van Lent	Belgium	26:04
6	Mariana Machado	Portugal	26:13
7	Sarah Lahti	Sweden	26:16
8	Manon Trapp	France	26:17
9	Flavie Renouard	France	26:19
10	Kate Axford	Great Britain	26:20
11	Niamh Allen	Ireland	26:20
12	Jessica Gibbon	Great Britain	26:21
13	Elisa Palmero	Italy	26:25
14	Izzy Fry	Great Britain	26:27
15	Bahar Yıldırım	Turkey	26:36
16	Carolina Robles	Spain	26:39
17	Abbie Donnelly	Great Britain	26:41
18	Lisa Rooms	Belgium	26:42
19	Ludovica Cavalli	Italy	26:42
20	Hanna Klein	Germany	26:46
21	Ineke van Koldam	Netherlands	26:48
22	Carla Gallardo	Spain	26:52
23	Victoria Warpy	Belgium	26:54
24	Idaira Prieto	Spain	26:54
25	Carolina Wikström	Sweden	26:56
26	Poppy Tank	Great Britain	26:57
27	Samrawit Mengsteab	Sweden	27:00
28	Nicole Svetlana Reina	Italy	27:00
29	Viktoriia Kaliuzhna	Ukraine	27:01
30	Derya Kunur	Turkey	27:03
31	Cristina Ruiz	Spain	27:04
32	Domenika Mayer	Germany	27:06
33	Zofia Dudek	Poland	27:07
34	Laura Taborda	Portugal	27:07
35	Sarah Madeleine	France	27:09
36	Greta Karinauskaitė	Lithuania	27:10
37	Cari Hughes	Great Britain	27:12
38	Roxane Cleppe	Belgium	27:14
39	Valentina Gemetto	Italy	27:18
40	Nanna Bové	Denmark	27:18
41	Alicia Berzoca	Spain	27:21
42	Patrycja Kapała	Poland	27:23
43	Veerle Bakker	Netherlands	27:25
44	Carla Arce	Spain	27:25
45	Sümeyye Erol	Turkey	27:28
46	Alberte Kjaer Pedersen	Denmark	27:30
47	Lilla Böhm	Hungary	27:31
48	Eva Dieterich	Germany	27:31
49	Célia Tabet	France	27:35
50	Marta Pen Freitas	Portugal	27:41
51	Ruken Tek	Turkey	27:42
52	Andrea Modin Engesaeth	Norway	27:42
53	Federica Del Buono	Italy	27:44
54	Selma Engdahk	Norway	27:45
55	Joana Vanessa Carvalho	Portugal	27:49
56	Emilia Lillemo	Sweden	27:58
57	Cheryl Nolan	Ireland	27:58
58	Neide Dias	Portugal	28:03
59	Alice Mitard	France	28:06
60	Lina Kiriliuk	Lithuania	28:12
61	Evelina Henriksson	Sweden	28:13
62	Ann-Marie McGlynn	Ireland	28:15
63	Julaine Hvid	Denmark	28:15
64	Farida Abaroge	ART	28:16
65	Maria Mihaela Blaga	Romania	28:16
66	Mary Mulhare	Ireland	28:25
67	Liis-Grete Arro	Estonia	28:25
68	Auksė Linkutė	Lithuania	28:27
69	Solange Jesus	Portugal	28:28
70	Anna Málková	Czech Republic	28:32
71	Josephine Thestrup	Denmark	28:36
72	Özlem Kaya Alici	Turkey	28:38
73	Fiona Everard	Ireland	28:47
74	Danielle Donegan	Ireland	28:52
75	Maria Magdalena Bosinceanu	Romania	29:17
76	Laura Maasik	Estonia	29:31
77	Ecaterina Cernat	Moldova	29:46
78	Lenuta Petronela Burr	Romania	29:55
79	Anna Yusupova	Azerbaijan	31:41
	Žofia Naňová	Slovakia	DNF
	Anna Zhmurko	Ukraine	DNS

Team race
Rank	Team	Points
1st place, gold medalist(s)	Italy; Nadia Battocletti; Elisa Palmero; Ludovica Cavalli; Nicole Svetlana Reina; Valentina Gemetto; Federica del Bueno	33 pts (1+13+19)
2nd place, silver medalist(s)	Great Britain; Kate Axford; Jessica Gibbon; Izzy Fry; Abbie Donnelly; Poppy Tank; Cari Hughes	36 pts (10+12+14)
3rd place, bronze medalist(s)	Belgium; Jana Van Lent; Lisa Rooms; Victoria Warpy; Roxane Cleppe	46 pts (5+18+23)
4	Turkey; Yasemin Can; Bahar Yıldırım; Derya Kunur; Sümeyye Erol; Ruken Tuk; Özlem Kaya Alici	48 pts (3+15+30)
5	France; Manon Trapp; Flavie Renouard; Sarah Madeleine; Célia Tabet; Alice Mitard	52 pts (8+9+35)
6	Germany; Konstanze Klosterhalfen; Hanna Klein; Domenika Mayer; Eva Dieterich	54 pts (2+20+32)
7	Sweden; Sarah Lahti; Carolina Wikström; Samrawit Mengsteab; Emilia Lillemo; Evelina Henriksson	59 pts (7+25+27)
8	Spain; Carolina Robles; Carla Gallardo; Idaira Prieto; Cristina Ruiz; Alicia Berzosa; Carla Arce	62 pts (16+2+24)
9	Portugal; Mariana Machado; Laura Taborda; Marta Pen Freitas; Joana Vanessa Carvalho; Neide Dias; Solange Jesus	90 pts (6+34+50)
10	Ireland; Niamh Allen; Cheryl Nolan; Ann-Marie McGlynn; Mary Mulhare; Fiona Everard; Danielle Donegan	130 pts (11+57+62)
11	Romania; Delvine Relin Meringor; Maria Mihaela Blaga; Maria Magdalena Bosinceanu; Lenuta Petronela Burr	144 pts (4+65+75)
12	Denmark; Nanna Bové; Alberte Kjaer Pedersen; Juliane Hvid; Josephine Thestrup	149 pts (40+46+63)
13	Lithuania; Greta Karinauskaitė; Lina Kiriliuk; Auksė Linkutė	223 pts (65+77+81)

=== U23 Men ===
Individual race
Rank	Athlete	Country	Time (m:s)
1st place, gold medalist(s)	Will Barnicoat	United Kingdom	18:27
2nd place, silver medalist(s)	Nicholas Griggs	Ireland	18:28
3rd place, bronze medalist(s)	David Stone	United Kingdom	18:31
4	Andrii Atamaniuk	Ukraine	18:35
5	Luc Le Baron	France	18:38
6	Konjoneh Maggi	Italy	18:41
7	Joel Ibler Lillesø	Denmark	18:43
8	Kevin Kamenschak	Austria	18:46
9	Pierre Boudy	France	18:47
10	Martin Perrin	France	18:49
11	Kamil Herzyk	Poland	18:50
12	Stefan Nillessen	Netherlands	18:52
13	Brett Rushman	United Kingdom	18:52
14	Noah Konteh	Belgium	18:55
15	Aurélien Radja	France	18:56
16	James Kingston	United Kingdom	18:56
17	Axel Vang Christensen	Denmark	18:58
18	Elias Ariel Aarestrup Shifris	Denmark	18:58
19	Maciej Megier	Poland	19:00
20	Miguel Angel Martínez	Spain	19:01
21	João Amaro	Portugal	19:04
22	Duarte Santos	Portugal	19:05
23	Niall Murphy	Ireland	19:06
24	Léo Lädermann	Switzerland	19:07
25	Pablo Alba	Spain	19:08
26	Sebastian Frey	Austria	19:09
27	Jesse Fokkenrood	Netherlands	19:10
28	Jaime Migallon	Spain	19:12
29	Callum Morgan	Ireland	19:13
30	Jonathan Hofer	Switzerland	19:13
31	Gábor Karsai	Hungary	19:15
32	Peter Molloy	United Kingdom	19:15
33	Gustav Bendsen	Denmark	19:16
34	Edouard Morin-Luzuy	France	19:18
35	Tristan Gevaert	Belgium	19:18
36	Brahim El Ourzadi	Spain	19:20
37	Cathal O'Reilly	Ireland	19:20
38	Nino Freitag	Switzerland	19:20
39	Mathis Lievens	Belgium	19:21
40	Mikko Kauppinen	Finland	19:22
41	Mauro Dallapiccola	Italy	19:23
42	João Pais	Portugal	19:23
43	Abdulhalik Çağiran	Turkey	19:26
44	Dafydd Jones	United Kingdom	19:27
45	Stefano Cecere	Italy	19:28
46	Eric Loré	Spain	19:33
47	Pol Oriach	Spain	19:36
48	Timo Hinterndorfer	Austria	19:38
49	Joseph Lavery	Ireland	19:40
50	Wiktor Antosz	Poland	19:41
51	Leandro Monteiro	Portugal	19:44
52	İsmail Taşyürek	Turkey	19:44
53	Mervan Haykir	Turkey	19:47
54	Morten Siht	Estonia	19:48
55	Stefano Benzoni	Italy	19:51
56	Ömer Faruk Bozdağ	Turkey	19:52
57	Ruben Pires	Portugal	19:52
58	Vegard Vesterhaug Warnes	Norway	19:55
59	Azat Demirtaş	Turkey	19:58
60	Robbe Theeuwes	Belgium	20:00
61	Thomas Sorci	Italy	20:01
62	Adam Bajorski	Poland	20:03
63	Paul Hartnett	Ireland	20:05
64	Maksym Karaim	Ukraine	20:12
65	William Knol	Netherlands	20:16
66	Nikita Bogdanovs	Latvia	20:20
67	Aleksii Pysarev	Ukraine	20:30
68	Nicolò Bedini	Italy	20:41
69	Diyar Ergüven	Turkey	20:43
70	Gabriel Farrugia	Malta	20:52
71	Andrei Ihnatiuc	Romania	21:04
72	Georgios-Christoforos Kyrtsis	Greece	21:14
73	Marco Tarnauceanu	Romania	21:31
74	Roberts Aleksis Glazers	Latvia	21:33
75	Nedas Kasparas	Lithuania	21:39
76	Raul Manuel Dan	Romania	21:50

Team race
Rank	Team	Points
1st place, gold medalist(s)	United Kingdom Will Barnicoat; David Stone; Brett Rushman; James Kingston; Peter Molloy; Dafydd Jones	17 pts (1+3+13)
2nd place, silver medalist(s)	France; Luc Le Baron; Pierre Boudy; Martin Perrin; Aurélien Radja; Edouard Morin-Luzuy	24 pts (5+9+10)
3rd place, bronze medalist(s)	Denmark; Joel Lillesø; Axel Christensen; Elias Shifris; Gustav Bendsen	42 pts (7+17+18)
4	Ireland; Nicholas Griggs; Niall Murphy; Callum Morgan; Cathal O'Reilly; Joseph Lavery; Paul Hartnett	54 pts (2+23+29)
5	Spain; Miguel Angel Martínez; Pablo Alba; Jaime Migallon; Brahim El Ourzadi; Eric Loré; Pol Oriach	73 pts (20+25+28)
6	Poland; Kamil Herzyk; Maciej Megier; Wiktor Antosz; Adam Bajorski	80 pts (11+19+50)
7	Austria; Kevin Kamenschak; Sebastian Frey; Timo Hinterndorfer	82 pts (8+26+48)
8	Portugal; João Amaro; Duarte Santos; João Pais; Leandro Monteiro; Ruben Pires	85 pts (21+22+42)
9	Belgium; Noah Konteh; Tristan Gevaert; Mathis Lievens; Robbe Theeuwes	88 pts (14+35+39)
10	Switzerland; Léo Lädermann; Jonathan Hofer; Nino Freitag	92 pts (24+30+38)
11	Italy; Konjoneh Maggi; Mauro Dallapiccola; Stefano Cecere; Stefano Benzoni; Thomas Sorci; Nicolò Bedini	92 pts (6+41+45)
12	Netherlands; Stefan Nillessen; Jesse Fokkenrood; William Knol	104 pts (12+27+65)
13	Ukraine; Andrii Atamaniuk; Maksym Karaim; Aleksii Pysarev	135 pts (4+64+67)
14	Turkey; Abdulhalik Çağiran; İsmail Taşyürek; Mervan Haykir; Ömer Faruk Bozdağ; Azat Demirtaş; Diyar Ergüven	148 pts (43+52+53)
15	Romania; Andrei Ihnatiuc; Marco Tarnauceanu; Raul Manuel Dan	220 pts (71+73+76)

=== U23 Women ===
Individual race
Rank	Athlete	Country	Time (m:s)
1st place, gold medalist(s)	Phoebe Anderson	United Kingdom	21:16
2nd place, silver medalist(s)	Maria Forero	Spain	21:21
3rd place, bronze medalist(s)	Ilona Mononen	Finland	21:24
4	Pia Schlattmann	Germany	21:35
5	Camille Place	France	21:35
6	Mia Waldmann	United Kingdom	21:38
7	Laura Mooney	Ireland	21:48
8	Pelinsu Şahin	Turkey	21:59
9	Olimpia Breza	Poland	22:00
10	Blanka Dörfel	Germany	22:02
11	Bieke Schipperen	Netherlands	22:02
12	Emmy Van den Berg	Netherlands	22:07
13	Emma McEvoy	Ireland	22:09
14	Esmanur Yilmaz	Turkey	22:10
15	Claudia Corral	Spain	22:12
16	Sila Bayir	Turkey	22:14
17	Tia Wilson	United Kingdom	22:14
18	Kate Willis	United Kingdom	22:16
19	Julie Voet	Belgium	22:17
20	Louisa Esmouni	France	22:22
21	Nursena Çeto	Turkey	22:22
22	Shirley Lang	Switzerland	22:23
23	Megan Gadsby	United Kingdom	22:24
24	Julia Koralewska	Poland	22:25
25	Marta Serrano	Spain	22:25
26	Mia Jurenka	Germany	22:26
27	Cordula Lassacher	Austria	22:26
28	Uliana Rachynska	Ukraine	22:27
29	Romane Wolhauser	Switzerland	22:31
30	Angela Viciosa	Spain	22:32
31	Marie-Theres Gruber	Austria	22:32
32	Ilaria Bruno	Italy	22:34
33	Greta Settino	Italy	22:36
34	Heloise Laigle	France	22:38
35	Urkuş Işık	Turkey	22:39
36	Thea Charlotte Knutsen	Norway	22:41
37	Ava O'Connor	Ireland	22:42
38	Jihad Essoubai	Spain	22:44
39	Ambar Tomas	Spain	22:47
40	Merve Karakaya	Turkey	22:48
41	Petra Santos	Portugal	22:49
42	Liv Dinis	Sweden	22:50
43	Adele Roatta	Italy	22:51
44	Clara Jobbin	France	22:51
45	Lucy Holmes	Ireland	22:53
46	Yasmine Abbes	Netherlands	22:55
47	Aurora Bado	Italy	22:55
48	Nélie Clément	France	22:56
49	Rita Figueiredo	Portugal	22:58
50	Roise Roberts	Ireland	22:58
51	Melissa Fracassini	Italy	22:59
52	Charlotte Van Laethem	Belgium	23:01
53	Yasna Petrova	Bulgaria	23:04
54	Amy Greene	Ireland	23:08
55	Lisa Redlinger	Austria	23:11
56	Beatriz Rios	Portugal	23:13
57	Hannah Anderson	Finland	23:17
58	Poppy Craig-Mcfeely	United Kingdom	23:18
59	Yana Pauwelyn	Belgium	23:18
60	Agnese Carcano	Italy	23:19
61	Katarzyna Napiórkowska	Poland	23:25
62	Marie-Louise Jørgensen	Denmark	23:35
63	Femke Rosbergen	Netherlands	23:36
64	Lea Haler	Slovenia	23:36
65	Karolina Bliujūtė	Lithuania	23:45
66	Emma D'Haene	Belgium	23:46
67	Katharina Götschl	Austria	24:00
68	Alexandra Canedo	Portugal	24:12
69	Katariina Kärkkäinen	Finland	24:13
70	Diana Fernandes	Portugal	25:02
71	Ana Silva	Portugal	25:08
	Sini-Sofia Rajaniemi	Finland	DNF

Team race
Rank	Team	Points
1st place, gold medalist(s)	United Kingdom; Phoebe Anderson; Mia Waldmann; Tia Wilson; Kate Willis; Megan Gadsby; Poppy Craig-Mcfeely	24 pts (1+6+17)
2nd place, silver medalist(s)	Turkey; Pelinsu Şahin; Esmanur Yilmaz; Sila Bayir; Nursena Çeto; Urkuş Işık; Merve Karakaya	38 pts (8+14+16)
3rd place, bronze medalist(s)	Germany; Pia Schlattmann; Blanka Dörfel; Mia Jurenka	40 pts (4+10+26)
4	Spain; Maria Forero; Claudia Corral; Marta Serrano; Angela Viciosa; Jihad Essoubai; Ambar Tomas	42 pts (2+15+25)
5	Ireland; Laura Mooney; Emma McEvoy; Ava O'Connor; Lucy Holmes; Roise Roberts; Amy Greene	57 pts (7+13+37)
6	France; Camille Place; Louisa Esmouni; Heloise Laigle; Clara Jobbin; Nélie Clément	59 pts (5+20+34)
7	Netherlands; Bieke Schipperen; Emmy Van den Berg; Yasmine Abbes; Femke Rosbergen	69 pts (11+12+46)
8	Poland; Olimpia Breza; Julia Koralewska; Katarzyna Napiórkowska	94 pts (9+24+61)
9	Italy; Ilaria Bruno; Greta Settino; Adele Roatta; Aurora Bado; Melissa Fracassini; Agnese Carcano	108 pts (32+33+43)
10	Austria; Cordula Lassacher; Marie-Theres Gruber; Lisa Redlinger; Katharina Götschl	113 pts (27+31+55)
11	Finland; Ilona Mononen; Hannah Anderson; Katariina Kärkkäinen; Sini-Sofia Rajaniemi	129 pts (3+57+69)
12	Belgium; Julie Voet; Charlotte Van Laethem; Yana Pauwelyn; Emma D'Haene	130 pts (19+52+59)
13	Portugal; Petra Santos; Rita Figueiredo; Beatriz Rios; Alexandra Canedo; Diana Fernandes; Ana Silva	146 pts (41+49+56)

=== U20 Men ===
Individual race
Rank	Athlete	Country	Time (m:s)
1st place, gold medalist(s)	Niels Laros	Netherlands	14:07
2nd place, silver medalist(s)	George Couttie	United Kingdom	14:09
3rd place, bronze medalist(s)	Andreas Fjeld Halvorsen	Norway	14:16
4	Magnus Øyen	Norway	14:16
5	Karl Ottfalk	Sweden	14:18
6	Ishak Dahmani	France	14:19
7	Ali Tunç	Turkey	14:20
8	Juan Zijderlaan	Netherlands	14:21
9	Sem Serrano	Belgium	14:23
10	Kristian Bråthen Børve	Norway	14:23
11	Nathan Houwaard	Netherlands	14:24
12	Sebastian Lörstad	Sweden	14:24
13	Jakob Dieterich	Germany	14:24
14	Leni Remer Mancini	France	14:24
15	Willem Renders	Belgium	14:25
16	Romuald Brosset	Switzerland	14:25
17	Unai Naranjo	Spain	14:25
18	Miles Waterworth	United Kingdom	14:26
19	Loïc Berger	Switzerland	14:27
20	Mael Henric	France	14:28
21	Oscar Gaitan	Spain	14:29
22	William Sean Rabjohns	United Kingdom	14:30
23	Alex Pintado	Spain	14:31
24	Francesco Ropelato	Italy	14:32
25	Francesco Mazza	Italy	14:32
26	Lughaidh Mallon	Ireland	14:33
27	Elia Triaca	Switzerland	14:33
28	Noah Harris	Ireland	14:34
29	Jonas Stafford	Ireland	14:34
30	Kiyasettin Kara	Turkey	14:35
31	Joshua Abraham	France	14:37
32	Matthieu Bührer	Switzerland	14:40
33	David Scheller	Germany	14:41
34	Tobias Tent	Germany	14:41
35	Cormac Dixon	Ireland	14:41
36	Lucian Florin Ștefan	Romania	14:42
37	Jakub Abramczyk	Poland	14:43
38	Andres Lara	Spain	14:44
39	Dragoș Luca Pop	Romania	14:44
40	Sean Quinn	Ireland	14:44
41	Muhammed Akgün	Turkey	14:44
42	André Barbosa	Portugal	14:45
43	Gonçalo José Sousa	Spain	14:46
44	Alexandre Lucas	Portugal	14:46
45	Hamza Yaşin	Turkey	14:46
46	Tiago Jorge	Portugal	14:48
47	Barış Aktaş	Turkey	14:48
48	Quinn Miell-Ingram	United Kingdom	14:48
49	Henry Dover	United Kingdom	14:50
50	Alessandro Santangelo	Italy	14:51
51	Marcos Crespo	Spain	14:53
52	Elias Kolar	Germany	14:54
53	Sebastian Bræmer Nygaard	Denmark	14:55
54	Bilal Safadi	France	14:55
55	Manuel Dos Santos	Portugal	14:56
56	Daniel Marák	Czech Republic	14:56
57	Pedro Rodrigues	Portugal	14:58
58	Åsmund Sunde Førde	Norway	14:59
59	Kristers Kudlis	Latvia	15:00
60	Théotime Popea	Switzerland	15:01
61	Hugo Jeukenne	Belgium	15:01
62	Frank McGrath	Ireland	15:01
63	Paul Walochny	Germany	15:03
64	Daan Lievens	Belgium	15:03
65	Leonardo Mazzoni	Italy	15:03
66	Bertold Kalász	Hungary	15:06
67	Rui Mineiro	Portugal	15:09
68	Jochem Wiersma	Netherlands	15:11
69	Samuel Berhane	Sweden	15:12
70	Krzysztof Zieliński	Poland	15:14
71	Luciano Carallo	Italy	15:15
72	Oliver Conway	United Kingdom	15:15
73	Furkan Mutlu	Turkey	15:17
74	Alex Hulka	Slovakia	15:18
75	Veljko Vasiljević	Serbia	15:21
76	Rostyslav Matkovskyi	Ukraine	15:21
77	Filip Toul	Czech Republic	15:26
78	Jiří Špiroch	Czech Republic	15:28
79	Benjamin Azimi Khanlarkhani	Denmark	15:29
80	Sergej Kostić	Serbia	15:33
81	Rūdolfs Vanadziņš	Latvia	15:35
82	Tudor Mihai Margașoiu	Romania	15:37
83	Vitalii Alokhin	Ukraine	15:41
84	Tjaž Djaj Bartolj	Slovenia	15:45
85	Sten Sihver	Estonia	15:46
86	Emīls Matiass Reinfelds	Latvia	15:47
87	Valentas Mockus	Lithuania	15:53
88	Mihai-Alin Șavlovschi	Romania	16:00
89	Sebastian Smed Grønkjær	Denmark	16:02
90	Kabir Ziljkić	Serbia	16:04
91	Taras Heshko	Ukraine	16:20
92	Luka Aljaž Pajek	Slovenia	16:22
93	Filip Jančík	Slovakia	16:25
94	William Thøgersen	Denmark	16:39
	Aldin Ćatović	Serbia	DNF

Team race
Rank	Team	Points
1st place, gold medalist(s)	Norway; Andreas Fjeld Halvorsen; Magnus Øyen; Kristian Bråthen Børve; Åsmund Sunde Førde	17 pts (3+4+10)
2nd place, silver medalist(s)	Netherlands; Niels Laros; Juan Zijderlaan; Nathan Houwaard; Jochem Wiersma	20 pts (1+8+11)
3rd place, bronze medalist(s)	France; Ishak Dahmani; Leni Remer Mancini; Mael Henric; Joshua Abraham; Bilal Safadi	40 pts (6+14+20)
4	United Kingdom; George Couttie; Miles Waterworth; William Sean Rabjohns; Quinn Miell-Ingram; Henry Dover; Oliver Conway	42 pts (2+18+22)
5	Spain; Unai Naranjo; Oscar Gaitan; Alex Pintado; Andres Lara; Gonçalo José Sousa; Marcos Crespo	61 pts (17+21+23)
6	Switzerland; Romuald Brosset; Loïc Berger; Elia Triaca; Matthieu Bührer; Théotime Popea	62 pts (16+19+27)
7	Turkey; Ali Tunç; Kiyasettin Kara; Muhammed Akgün; Hamza Yaşin; Barış Aktaş; Furkan Mutlu	78 pts (7+30+41)
8	Germany; Jakob Dieterich; David Scheller; Tobias Tent; Elias Kolar; Paul Walochny	80 pts (13+33+34)
9	Ireland; Lughaidh Mallon; Noah Harris; Jonas Stafford; Cormac Dixon; Sean Quinn; Frank McGrath	83 pts (26+28+29)
10	Belgium; Sem Serrano; Willem Renders; Hugo Jeukenne; Daan Lievens	85 pts (9+15+61)
11	Sweden; Karl Ottfalk; Sebastian Lörstad; Samuel Berhane	86 pts (5+12+69)
12	Italy; Francesco Ropelato; Francesco Mazza; Alessandro Santangelo; Leonardo Mazzoni; Luciano Carallo	99 pts (24+25+50)
13	Portugal; André Barbosa; Alexandre Lucas; Tiago Jorge; Manuel Dos Santos; Pedro Rodrigues; Rui Mineiro	132 pts (42+44+46)
14	Romania; Lucian Florin Ștefan; Dragoș Luca Pop; Tudor Mihai Margașoiu; Mihai-Alin Șavlovschi	157 pts (36+39+82)
15	Czech Republic; Daniel Marák; Filip Toul; Jiří Špiroch	211 pts (56+77+78)
16	Denmark; Sebastian Bræmer Nygaard; Benjamin Azimi Khanlarkhani; Sebastian Smed Grønkjær; William Thøgersen	221 pts (53+79+89)
17	Latvia; Kristers Kudlis; Rūdolfs Vanadziņš; Emīls Matiass Reinfelds	226 pts (59+81+86)
18	Serbia; Veljko Vasiljević; Sergej Kostić; Kabir Ziljkić; Aldin Ćatović	245 pts (75+80+90)
19	Ukraine; Rostyslav Matkovskyi; Vitalii Alokhin; Taras Heshko	250 pts (76+83+91)

=== U20 Women ===
Individual race
Rank	Athlete	Country	Time (m:s)
1st place, gold medalist(s)	Innes Fitzgerald	United Kingdom	15:47
2nd place, silver medalist(s)	Jess Bailey	United Kingdom	15:58
3rd place, bronze medalist(s)	Sofia Thøgersen	Denmark	16:03
4	Julia Ehrle	Germany	16:03
5	Jade Le Corre	France	16:18
6	Eleanor Strevens	United Kingdom	16:28
7	Wilma Bekkemoen Torbjörnsson	Norway	16:33
8	Shirin Kerber	Switzerland	16:37
9	Margot Dajoux	France	16:38
10	Fabienne Müller	Switzerland	16:39
11	Zoe Gilbody	United Kingdom	16:42
12	Lucia Arnoldo	Italy	16:44
13	Marte Hovland	Norway	16:47
14	Edibe Yağız	Turkey	16:51
15	Laura Ribigini	Italy	16:52
16	Elsa Sundqvist	Sweden	16:53
17	Licia Ferrari	Italy	16:53
18	Lizzie Wellsted	United Kingdom	16:53
19	Anna Gardiner	Ireland	16:54
20	Lucy Foster	Ireland	16:55
21	Ida Kraft	Sweden	16:55
22	Havva Efe	Turkey	16:56
23	Juliette Secretin	Belgium	16:56
24	Majken Söderlund Larsson	Sweden	16:58
25	Lili-Meije Delaunay-Foglino	France	16:59
26	Nadia Soto	Spain	16:59
27	Chiara Munaretto	Italy	17:02
28	Charlotte Penneman	Belgium	17:02
29	Mejra Mehmedović	Serbia	17:04
30	Hannah Enkels	Belgium	17:06
31	Noreen Sdour	France	17:06
32	Annabel Morrison	Ireland	17:08
33	Anouk Danna	Switzerland	17:10
34	Laly Porentru	France	17:11
35	Nina Van Pelt	Belgium	17:16
36	Isobelle Jones	United Kingdom	17:17
37	Elif Akçiçek	Turkey	17:18
38	Kaate Mulders	Netherlands	17:18
39	Laia Cariñanos	Spain	17:18
40	Constance Pittet	Switzerland	17:19
41	Lara Balažić	Slovenia	17:20
42	Alice Rosa Brusin	Italy	17:21
43	Elisa Clementi	Italy	17:23
44	Viyan Adar	Turkey	17:23
45	Adia Budde	Germany	17:24
46	Anna Rovirosa	Spain	17:27
47	Candela Blazquez	Spain	17:28
48	Solange Nunes	Portugal	17:28
49	June Sudupe	Spain	17:30
50	Aneta Kramosilová	Czech Republic	17:30
51	Sibilia Vanadziņa	Latvia	17:32
52	Caitlin Hughes	Ireland	17:33
53	Selma Eldevik	Norway	17:35
54	Emily Junginger	Germany	17:36
55	Daria Domżałska	Poland	17:36
56	Lara Costa	Portugal	17:37
57	Loes Kempe	Netherlands	17:37
58	Julia Rosén	Sweden	17:40
59	Saima Murić	Serbia	17:43
60	Hannah Kinane	Sweden	17:43
61	Sofiia Hordiichuk	Ukraine	17:45
62	Vendula Šoukalová	Czech Republic	17:47
63	Elif Naz Köseoğlu	Turkey	17:48
64	Cátia Khvas	Portugal	17:49
65	Jule Jutta Lindner	Germany	17:52
66	Avril Millerick	Ireland	17:53
67	Klara Močnik	Slovenia	17:54
68	Ema Berková	Czech Republic	17:56
69	Ema Pika Raj	Slovenia	17:57
70	Tara Vučković	Serbia	17:58
71	Eleonora Višnevskytė	Lithuania	17:58
72	Dora Suljanović	Slovenia	18:06
73	İran İnce	Turkey	18:08
74	Austra Osiņa	Latvia	18:10
75	Alexandra Maria Hudea	Romania	18:12
76	Kaisa-Maria Oll	Estonia	18:13
77	Diana Verdeș	Romania	18:14
78	Ada Werner	Germany	18:14
79	Carlota Almeida	Portugal	18:15
80	Olha Pravetska	Ukraine	18:16
81	Beatriz Azevedo	Portugal	18:18
82	Emma Mendez	Spain	18:18
83	Viviana Popovičová	Slovakia	18:33
84	Alise Petrova	Latvia	18:33
85	Claudia Ionela Costiuc	Romania	18:39
86	Eva Bartlett	Ireland	18:46
87	Alexandra Schipai	Estonia	18:48
88	Marta Luīze Pētersone	Latvia	18:52
89	Elena Puškar	Serbia	19:13
90	Nataliia Bilinkevych	Ukraine	20:39
	Lenuta Constantin	Romania	DNF
	Stela Fernandes	Portugal	DNF

Team race
Rank	Team	Points
1st place, gold medalist(s)	United Kingdom; Innes Fitzgerald; Jess Bailey; Eleanor Strevens; Zoe Gilbody; Lizzie Wellsted; Isobelle Jones	9 pts (1+2+6)
2nd place, silver medalist(s)	France; Jade Le Corre; Margot Dajoux; Lili-Meije Delaunay-Foglino; Noreen Sdour; Laly Porentru	39 pts (5+9+25)
3rd place, bronze medalist(s)	Italy; Lucia Arnoldo; Laura Ribigini; Licia Ferrari; Chiara Munaretto; Alice Rosa Brusin; Elisa Clementi	44 pts (12+15+17)
4	Switzerland; Shirin Kerber; Fabienne Müller; Anouk Danna; Constance Pittet	51 pts (8+10+33)
5	Sweden; Elsa Sundqvist; Ida Kraft; Majken Söderlund Larsson; Julia Rosén; Hannah Kinane	61 pts (16+21+24)
6	Ireland; Anna Gardiner; Lucy Foster; Annabel Morrison; Caitlin Hughes; Avril Millerick; Eva Bartlett	71 pts (19+20+32)
7	Turkey; Edibe Yağız; Havva Efe; Elif Akçiçek; Viyan Adar; Elif Naz Köseoğlu; İran İnce	73 pts (14+22+37)
8	Norway; Wilma Bekkemoen Torbjörnsson; Marte Hovland; Selma Eldevik	73 pts (7+13+53)
9	Belgium; Juliette Secretin; Charlotte Penneman; Hannah Enkels; Nina Van Pelt	81 pts (23+28+30)
10	Germany; Julia Ehrle; Adia Budde; Emily Junginger; Jule Jutta Lindner; Ada Werner	103 pts (4+45+54)
11	Spain; Nadia Soto; Laia Cariñanos; Anna Rovirosa; Candela Blazquez; June Sudupe; Emma Mendez	111 pts (26+39+46)
12	Serbia; Mejra Mehmedović; Saima Murić; Tara Vučković; Elena Puškar	158 pts (29+59+70)
13	Portugal; Solange Nunes; Lara Costa; Cátia Khvas; Carlota Almeida; Beatriz Azevedo; Stela Fernandes	168 pts (48+56+64)
14	Slovenia; Lara Balažić; Klara Močnik; Ema Pika Raj; Dora Suljanović	177 pts (41+67+69)
15	Czech Republic; Aneta Kramosilová; Vendula Šoukalová; Ema Berková	180 pts (50+62+68)
16	Latvia; Sibilia Vanadziņa; Austra Osiņa; Alise Petrova; Marta Luīze Pētersone	209 pts (51+74+84)
17	Ukraine; Sofiia Hordiichuk; Olha Pravetska; Nataliia Bilinkevych	231 pts (61+80+90)
18	Romania; Alexandra Maria Hudea; Diana Verdeș; Claudia Ionela Costiuc; Lenuta Constantin	237 pts (75+77+85)

=== Mixed Relay ===
Rank	Team	Time (m:s)
1st place, gold medalist(s)	Italy; Sebastiano Parolini, Marta Zenoni, Sintayehu Vissa, Pietro Arese	18:02
2nd place, silver medalist(s)	France; Antoine Senard, Emilie Girard, Agathe Guillemot, Simon Bedard	18:02
3rd place, bronze medalist(s)	United Kingdom; Joshua Lay, Maddie Deadman, Elise Thorner, Tyler Bilyard	18:02
4	Netherlands; Robin Van Riel, Dagmar Smid, Marissa Damink, Stefan Nillessen	18:12
5	Spain; Jesús Gómez, Marta Pérez, Esther Guerrero, Adrián Ben	18:27
6	Poland; Michał Groberski, Martyna Galant, Magdalena Breza, Filip Rak	18:32
7	Belgium; Ziad Audah, Mariska Parewyck, Eline Dalemans, Tibaut Vandelannoote	18:33
8	Turkey; İbrahim Erata, Gamze Bulut Duvar, Tuğba Toptaş, Uğur Kemal Derin	19:04
9	Portugal; José Carlos Pinto, Patricia Silva, Marta Castro, Rodrigo Lima	19:04
10	Ukraine; Vadim Lonskiy, Tetiana Chornovol, Alina Korsunska, Vasyl Sabunyak	19:23
11	Andorra; Pol Moya, Carles Gómez Lozano, Aina Cinca Bons, Jeanne Cros	19:58
