= Cari Hughes =

Welsh athlete (born 1999)

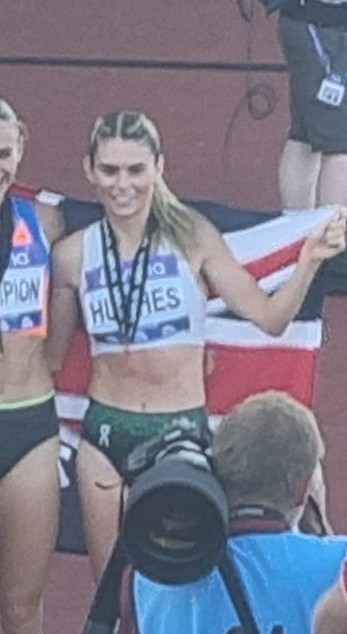
- Cari Hughes at the 2025 UK Athletics Championships

Personal information
- Nationality: British (Welsh)
- Born: 15 March 1999 (age 27)

Sport
- Sport: Athletics
- Event: Long distance running
- Club: Cardiff AAC

Achievements and titles
- Personal bests: 1500m: 4:06.17 (2024); 3000m: 8:48.95 (2024); 5000m: 15:05.05 (2025); 3000m s'chase: 9:41.66 (2025)
Medal record
Representing Great Britain
European Cross Country Championships
Silver medal – second place	2024 Antalya	Team
Bronze medal – third place	2021 Dublin	U23 Team

Cari Hughes (born 15 March 1999) is a Welsh distance and cross country runner.

== Biography ==
A member of the Swansea Harriers, in 2017 she won the Welsh Schools title, Welsh Junior title and represented Great Britain in the junior races at the IAAF World Cross Country Championships and European Cross-Country Championships. In 2018, she broke the Welsh Junior 1500m record in the summer of 2018, running a new lifetime best of 4:17.51 at the BMC Stretford Grand Prix. That year she became the British Universities and Colleges Sport (BUCS) 1500m champion, running for Loughborough University. She won Junior Female Endurance Athlete of the Year at the 2018 Welsh Athletics Awards.

She won a bronze medal with the British U23 team at the 2021 European Cross Country Championships in Dublin. She was a member of the British senior team at the 2022 European Cross Country Championships in Turin, placing 22nd individually.

She won the 800 metres and finished second in the 1500 metres representing Ynys Môn at the 2023 Island Games in Guernsey.

She finished behind Megan Davies but ahead of 2020 Olympic Games finalist Alexandra Bell at the Armagh 5 km road race in February 2024. In November 2024, she was the second British woman to finish the Cardiff Cross Challenge, part of the World Athletics Cross Country Tour, behind Kate Axford. She finished as runner-up to Axford at the Liverpool Cross Challenge on 23 November 2024, an event which doubled-up as the British trials for the Euro Cross Championships. She was subsequently selected for the British team for the 2024 European Cross Country Championships in Antalya, Turkey.

On 2 August, she set a new Welsh record to finish third behind Elise Thorner and Sarah Tait in the 3000 metres steeplechase at the 2025 UK Athletics Championships in Birmingham in 9:41.66.

After a second-place finish the previous year, she won the 2025 Liverpool Cross Challenge to gain automatic selection for the 2025 European Cross Country Championships where the British team won the silver medal in the team event. On 31 December, Hughes placed fourth at the BOclassic Alto Adige, a World Athletics Label road race, in Bolzano, Italy.

In July 2026, she placed eighth competing for Wales in the 3000 m steeplechase at the 2026 Commonwealth Games in Glasgow.

== Personal life ==
From Welshpool, her brother Iolo Hughes is also a runner.
