= 2025 European Athletics U23 Championships – Men's 5000 metres =

Men's 5000 metres at the 2025 European Athletics U23 Championships
- Venue: Fana Stadion
- Location: Bergen, Norway
- Dates: 19 July
- Competitors: 21 from 13 nations
- Winning time: 13:44.74

Medalists
gold medal	Niels Laros	Netherlands
silver medal	Nick Griggs	Ireland
bronze medal	Will Barnicoat	Great Britain

The men's 5000 metres event at the 2025 European Athletics U23 Championships was held in Bergen, Norway, at Fana Stadion on 19 July.

== Records ==
Prior to the competition, the records were as follows:

Record	Athlete (nation)	Time (s)	Location	Date
European U23 record	Jakob Ingebrigtsen (NOR)	12:48.45	Florence, Italy	10 June 2021
Championship U23 record	Ali Kaya (TUR)	13:20.16	Tallinn, Estonia	11 July 2015

== Results ==
Place	Athlete	Nation	Time	Notes
1st place, gold medalist(s)	Niels Laros	Netherlands	13:44.74	
2nd place, silver medalist(s)	Nick Griggs	Ireland	13:45.80	
3rd place, bronze medalist(s)	Will Barnicoat	Great Britain	13:46.11	
4	Kamil Herzyk	Poland	13:46.73	
5	Andreas Fjeld Halvorsen	Norway	13:47.52	
6	Jonathan Grahn	Sweden	13:47.98	
7	Imad El Goumri	France	13:48.16	
8	Duarte Santos	Portugal	13:48.28	PB
9	Aurélien Radja	France	13:52.59	
10	Callum Morgan	Ireland	13:53.18	
11	Aleix Vives	Spain	13:53.97	
12	Konjoneh Maggi	Italy	13:54.74	PB
13	Jaime Migallón	Spain	13:55.15	
14	Edward Bird	United Kingdom	13:56.82	
15	Antonin Saint-Peyre	France	14:08.90	
16	Theodor Schucht	Germany	14:10.22	
17	Benne Anderson	Germany	14:13.88	
18	James Dargan	United Kingdom	14:14.42	
19	Unai Naranjo	Spain	14:30.98	
20	Vetle Farbu-Solbakken	Norway	14:37.25	
—	Joel Ibler Lillesø	Denmark	DNF	
