= Eliza Nicholson (runner) =

British athlete (born 2007)

Personal information
- Nationality: British
- Born: 29 May 2007 (age 19)

Sport
- Sport: Athletics

Achievements and titles
- Personal bests: 3000m: 9.24:17 (Chelmsford, 2023)
Medal record
Women's athletics
Representing Great Britain
Commonwealth Youth Games
Bronze medal – third place	2023 Trinbago	3000 m

Eliza Nicholson (born 29 May 2007) is a British long-distance runner.

== Early life ==
From Sevenoaks in Kent, Nicholson was a child actress. She attended Mander Portman Woodward school. She took up distance running in 2021 during the COVID-19 pandemic lockdown.

== Career ==
A member of Sevenoaks Athletics Club, Nicholson finished fifth at the British Schools Cross Country Championships in March 2023.

She ran 9:30.05 for the 3000m in the U17s category at the South of England Senior and U20 Championships in June 2023. She won the silver medal at the England Athletics U20 Women's 3000m at Chelmsford in June 2023, aged 16 years-old. Her time was a personal best of 9:24.17. Nicholson won gold on her schools international debut, in Grangemouth, Scotland, at the SIAB Home International meet, winning the intermediate girls’ 3000m race by around 20 seconds in 9:25.85.

In August 2023, she won bronze in the women's 3000m event in a time of 9:26.00 at the Commonwealth Youth Games in Trinidad and Tobago.

She made her debut for Team England cross country as part of the victorious England women's junior team alongside Innes Fitzgerald, Isobelle Jones, and Jess Bailey at the London International country event at Parliament Hill, placing second in the individual race in January 2024. That year, she was runner up to FitzGerald at the English Schools Cross Country Championship. In March 2024, she finished as runner up to FitzGerald at the UK Inter-Counties Cross Country Championships at Wollaton Park to earn an automatic place on the British U20 team for the 2024 World Athletics Cross Country Championships in Serbia alongside Natasha Phillips and Innes FitzGerald. She finished in 25th place, as Britain finished fifth in the team U20 event.

In 2025, she was selected to represent England U20 at the 2025 Home Countries International and the Hannut CrossCup. She was runner-up to Isabelle Jones at the Belgium Cross Cup in the junior women's race, a World Athletics World Tour Gold Event. She won the junior women's race at the 2025 Home Countries International.

In December 2025, Nicholson competed in the team under-20 event at the 2025 European Cross Country Championships in Lagos, Portugal. She was subsequently named in the British team for the 2026 World Athletics Cross Country Championships in Tallahassee, Florida, where she was the leading British finisher in the U20 women's race, leading the British team to a joint-tenth place finish. In July, Nicholson won the 5000 metres title at the 2026 England Athletics U20 Championships. She was selected as part of the Great Britain team to compete at the 2026 World Athletics U20 Championships.
