= Eleanor Strevens =

British athlete (born 2006)

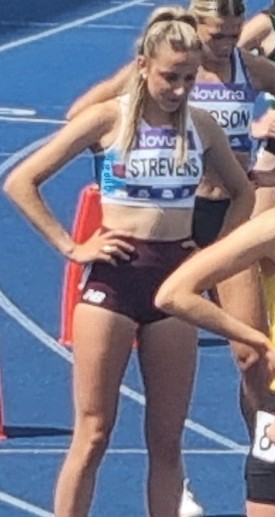
- 2025 UK Athletics Championships

Personal information
- Nickname: Strevs
- Born: 14 May 2006 (age 20)

Sport
- Sport: Athletics
- Event(s): Middle-distance running, Cross country running

Achievements and titles
- Personal best(s): 800m: 2:04.45 (2025); 1500m: 4:13.41 (2025)
Medal record
Women's athletics
Representing Great Britain
European Cross Country Championships
Gold medal – first place	2024 Antalya	U20 Team

Eleanor Strevens (born 14 May 2006) is a professional British middle-distance and cross country runner, signed with New Balance.

== Biography ==
From Eastbourne in Sussex, she is a member of Eastbourne Rovers athletics club having joined the club at the age of nine years-old. She was coached by Chris Voice for nine years. Having started at the University of Birmingham in 2024, she began to be coached by Dean Miller.

She finished sixth in the U20 race at the 2024 European Cross Country Championships in Antalya, Turkey, helping Great Britain to win the women's U20 team gold medal at the event, alongside Innes FitzGerald and Jess Bailey. She won the British Universities and Colleges Sport (BUCS) short course cross country title that season. Selected to represent England, she also won the Elgoibar International Cross Country U20 race in Northern Spain.

She ran an indoors personal best for the 1500 metres of 4:17.43 at the 2025 British Indoor Athletics Championships in Birmingham, placing seventh overall in the final. In the spring of 2025 as she reached the conclusion of her first year at Birmingham University, she was runner-up to Abigail Ives in the BUCS 800 m race on the track. She won the women’s international 1500m at the Belfast Irish Milers Meet in May 2025, in a personal best time of 4:14.61. She lowered her personal best again at the British Milers Club Grand Prix in Birmingham the following month, running 4:13.41.

She was named in the British team for the 1500 metres at the 2025 European Athletics U20 Championships in Tampere, Finland, winning her heat in 4:20.70 before placing fifth in the final won by compatriot Lyla Belshaw, running 4:17.51.
