= Tyler Bilyard =

British athlete (born 2001)

Personal information
- Born: 8 October 2001 (age 24)

Sport
- Sport: Athletics
- Event: Long distance running

Achievements and titles
- Personal best(s): 800m: 1:47.36 (Manchester, 203); 1500m: 3:37.52 (Boston, 2025); Mile: 3:52.73 (Boston, 2025); 3000m: 7:55.80 (Boston, 2025)
Medal record
Men's athletics
Representing Great Britain
European Cross Country Championships
Bronze medal – third place	2024 Antalya	Mixed relay

Tyler Bilyard (born 8 October 2001) is a British runner. He was a bronze medalist in the mixed relay at the 2024 European Cross Country Championships and a gold medalist in the mixed relay at the 2024 World University Cross Country Championships.

== Early and personal life ==
from Great Yarmouth, Norfolk Billyard is a member of the Great Yarmouth and District Athletics Club. He attended the University of Birmingham, before transferring to the University of Washington in 2025.

== Career ==
In February 2024, he was part of the British gold medal winning short course relay team at the World University Cross Country Championships in Muscat, Oman.

He selected for the British mixed relay team which won the bronze medal at the 2024 European Cross Country Championships in Antalya, Turkey, running the final leg alongside Maddie Deadman, Elise Thorner and Joshua Lay.

He finished third in the 1500 metres at the 2025 British Indoor Athletics Championships in Birmingham in February 2025.

Competing for the University of Washington in the United States on 17 January 2026, Bilyard won the men's 1000 metres in the fourth-fastest collegiate performance time of 2:17.96, breaking the meet and facility record held by Yomif Kejelcha at the Washington Preview in Seattle. In June, he qualified for the final of the 1500 metres at the 2026 British Championships.
