= Joshua Lay =

British middle-distance runner (born 2000)

Personal information
- Nationality: British (English)
- Born: 11 April 2000 (age 26)

Sport
- Sport: Athletics
- Event: Middle distance running
- Club: Rugby

Achievements and titles
- Personal best: 800 m: 1:45.99 (Espoo, 2021) 1500m: 3:36.92 (Bellinzona, 2020) 3000m: 8:08.85 (Birmingham, 2022)
Medal record
Men's athletics
Representing Great Britain
European U20 Championships
Bronze medal – third place	2019 Borås	1500 m
European Cross Country Championships
Bronze medal – third place	2023 Brussels	Mixed relay
Bronze medal – third place	2024 Antalya	Mixed relay
Representing England
Commonwealth Youth Games
Silver medal – second place	2017 Bahamas	1500m

Joshua Lay (born 11 April 2000) is a British middle distance and cross country runner.

== Early life ==
He attended Northampton School for Boys between 2011 and 2018 before attending Loughborough University. As a teenager he became the first athlete since Sebastian Coe to be English Champion, English Schools Champion and British Universities Champion simultaneously.

== Career ==
He is a member of Rugby & Northampton Athletics Club. In 2019, he was a bronze medalist at the 2019 European Athletics U20 Championships in Boras over 1500 metres. He won the British Milers Club 800 metres race in July 2020 in a time of 1:48.75. He reached the final at the 2021 European Athletics U23 Championships over 1500 meters in Tallinn.

In November 2023 following a three-year struggle with shin injuries, Lay won the senior short course relay trial at the Liverpool Cross Challenge. In December 2023, he was a bronze medalist in the mixed relay at the 2023 European Cross Country Championships in Brussels alongside Bethan Morley, Adam Fogg and Khahisa Mhlanga.

He defended his short course title at the Liverpool across Challenge in November 2024 and was subsequently selected for the British mixed relay team which won the bronze medal at the 2024 European Cross Country Championships in Antalya, Turkey alongside Maddie Deadman, Elise Thorner and Tyler Bilyard.
