= Maddie Deadman =

British athlete (born 2000)

Personal information
- Nationality: British
- Born: 28 January 2000 (age 26)

Sport
- Sport: Athletics
- Event(s): Middle-distance running, Cross country running

Achievements and titles
- Personal best(s): 800m: 2:04.22 (2024); 1500m: 4:15.53 (2024)
Medal record
Women's athletics
Representing Great Britain
European Cross Country Championships
Bronze medal – third place	2024 Antalya	Mixed relay

Maddie Deadman (born 28 January 2000) is an English middle-distance and cross country runner from Basingstoke. She was a bronze medalist in the mixed team relay at the 2024 European Cross Country Championships.

== Early life ==
From Basingstoke, Deadman attended Aldworth Science College. In 2014, she won the U15 title at the British Modern Biathlon Championships in Solihull. She competed as a teenager for the Overton Harriers & Athletics Club.

== Career ==
Coached by Rod Finch of Basingstoke and Mid Hants Athletics Club, Deadman improved her 1500 metres personal best by six seconds during the 2024 track season. That year, Deadman qualified for the final of the 1500 metres at the 2024 British Athletics Championships in June 2024. The following month, she placed third at the English national championships in Birmingham over 1500 metres.

Competing in cross country running, Deadman won the British European Short Course Trials in Liverpool on November 23, 2024. She was subsequently selected for the British team to compete in the mixed team relay at the 2024 European Cross Country Championships in Antalya, Turkey. She won the bronze medal in the competition alongside compatriots Joshua Lay, Elise Thorner and Tyler Bilyard.
