= 2024 World Athletics U20 Championships – Men's 3000 metres =

Men's 3000 metres at the 2024 World Athletics U20 Championships
- Venue: Estadio Atlético de la VIDENA
- Dates: 29 August 2024 (final)
- Competitors: 21 from 15 nations
- Winning time: 8:20.56

Medalists
gold medal	Andreas Halvorsen	Norway
silver medal	Denis Kipkoech	Kenya
bronze medal	Edward Bird	Great Britain

The men's 3000 metres at the 2024 World Athletics U20 Championships was held at the Estadio Atlético de la VIDENA in Lima, Peru on 29 August 2024.

== Records ==
U20 standing records prior to the 2024 World Athletics U20 Championships were as follows:

Record	Athlete & Nationality	Mark	Location	Date
World U20 Record	Yomif Kejelcha (ETH)	7:28.19	Paris, France	27 August 2016
Championship Record	Tadese Worku (ETH)	7:42.09	Nairobi, Kenya	18 August 2021
World U20 Leading	Biniam Mehary (ETH)	7:33.04	Liévin, France	10 February 2024

== Results ==
The final was scheduled to start at 18:17.

Rank	Athlete	Nation	Time	Notes
1st place, gold medalist(s)	Andreas Halvorsen	Norway	8:20.56	
2nd place, silver medalist(s)	Denis Kipkoech	Kenya	8:20.79	
3rd place, bronze medalist(s)	Edward Bird	Great Britain	8:21.00	
4	Ybeltal Gashahun	Ethiopia	8:21.02	
5	Harbert Kibet	Uganda	8:21.54	
6	Karl Ottfalk	Sweden	8:23.14	
7	Osama Er-Radouani	Morocco	8:23.24	
8	Abrha Gebru	Ethiopia	8:23.60	
9	Yamato Hamaguchi	Japan	8:24.60	
10	Mick Wolvekamp	Netherlands	8:24.88	
11	Clinton Ngetich	Kenya	8:25.51	
12	Titus Musau	Uganda	8:26.16	
13	Oscar Gaitan	Spain	8:28.87	
14	Lionel Nihimbazwe	Burundi	8:29.36	
15	Simon Jeukenne	Belgium	8:32.35	
16	Ky Hehir	Australia	8:32.89	
17	Kristian Bråthen Børve	Norway	8:32.89	
18	Juan Zijderlaan	Netherlands	8:34.89	
19	Luis Huaman	Peru	8:45.22	
20	Lokoro Dario	ART	9:06.53	PB
21	Henry Dover	Great Britain	9:14.73	
–	Tetsu Sasaki	Japan	DNS	
