= India Weir =

British athlete (born 1999)

Personal information
- Nationality: British
- Born: 5 March 1999 (age 27)

Sport
- Sport: Track and field
- Events: Middle-distance, long-distance, Cross country running

Achievements and titles
- Personal bests: 1500m: 4:08.25 (Watford, 2025); 3000m: 9:06.63 (Birmingham, 2025); 5000m: 15:01.92 (Oordegem, 2025); 5km (road): 15:15 (Lille, 2026)

India Weir (born 5 November 1999) is a British middle- and long-distance and cross country runner. She was runner-up over 5000 metres at the 2025 UK Athletics Championships.

== Biography ==
In February 2025, Weir was runner-up competing for England at The Armagh International Road Race. Weir won the women's race at the Comeback 5000 in Battersea on 13 May 2025.

On 2 August 2025, she finished second in 15:47.98 in the 5000m at the 2025 UK Athletics Championships in Birmingham behind Hannah Nuttall but in front of Innes Fitzgerald. That month, she ran a new personal best of 15:01.92 for the 5000 metres in Oordegem, Belgium.

Weir was selected for the mixed relay at the 2026 World Athletics Cross Country Championships in Tallahassee, Florida, for her senior international debut, alongside George Couttie, Adam Fogg and Alexandra Millard, the team placing seventh overall.

In February 2026, Weir competed over 3000 metres at the 2026 British Indoor Athletics Championships in Birmingham, placing fourth overall. On 11 August, Weir was 16th in 15:55.42 in the 5000 metres race at the 2026 European Athletics Championships in Birmingham.

== Personal life ==
Weir competed in the United States college system for Princeton University. Her sister Kosana also competed as a distance runner in the NCAA, for Yale University.
