= Emilie Girard =

French athlete (born 2000)

Personal information
- Born: 26 December 2000 (age 25) Lyon, France
- Height: 170 cm (5 ft 7 in)
- Weight: 52 kg (115 lb)

Sport
- Country: France
- Sport: Athletics
- Event: Middle distance running

Achievements and titles
- Personal bests: 1500m: 4:17.63 (Angers, 2021)
Medal record
Women's athletics
Representing France
European Cross Country Championships
Silver medal – second place	2024 Antalya	Mixed relay

Emilie Girard (born 26 December 2000) is a French middle-distance runner. She was a silver medalist in the mixed relay at the 2024 European Cross Country Championships.

== Career ==
From Lyon in the Auvergne-Rhône-Alpes region of France, she is a member of Décines Meyzieu Athlétisme. Trained by Bastien Perraux, she won the French junior indoor 800 metres title in Liévin in a time of 2:11.28 in February 2019. In March 2019, she made her debut in a French vest at the U20 ITA - FRA Indoor Match, in Ancona, Italy, in which she placed second in the 1500 metres in a time of 4:27.12, behind her training teammate Bérénice Fulchiron, with both athletes finishing inside the national under-20 record. She was also runner-up in the French U20 cross country championships in 2019 in Vittel. She subsequently competed for France again at the 2019 IAAF World Cross Country Championships in Aarhus, Denmark, in March 2019. In January 2020, she won the Rhône cross country short course championship held in Decines.

She joined the University of Oregon in 2021. She won the Portland Distance Carnival 1500m race in 2023. She returned to France in 2024, winning the Villeurbanne 10km road race in March 2024.

She finished as runner-up to Agathe Guillemot in the French short course cross country trials in November 2024. She was subsequently selected for the French mixed relay team for the 2024 European Cross Country Championships in Antalya, Turkey. She won a silver medal in the mixed team relay alongside Antoine Senard, Simon Bedard, and Guillemot.
