= Bérénice Cleyet-Merle =

Latvian-French athlete (born 1994)

Personal information
- Born: 24 October 1994 (age 31) Vienne, Isère, France
- Height: 173 cm (5 ft 8 in)
- Weight: 57 kg (126 lb)

Sport
- Country: Latvia
- Sport: Athletics
- Events: Middle distance and long distance running

Achievements and titles
- Personal bests: 800m: 2:01.63 (Decines, 2023) 1500m: 4:03.58 (Paris, 2026); Mile: 4:26.06 (Monaco, 2023)NR; 3000m: 9:26.77 (Allendale, 2021); Road: Mile: 4:34.41 (Riga, 2023)NR
Medal record
Women's athletics
Representing France
European Cross Country Championships
Gold medal – first place	2023 Brussels	Mixed relay

Bérénice Cleyet-Merle (born 24 October 1994) is a Latvian-French middle distance and long distance runner. She became French indoor national champion over 1500 metres in 2023. She is the former French national record holder in the mile on the track and the road. She switched her national allegiance to Latvia in September 2026.

== Biography ==
She was the gold medalist in the 1500 metres at the 2023 French Indoor Athletics Championships in Aubière. In March 2023, she competed in the European Athletics Indoor Championships in Istanbul, Turkey, over 1500 metres, but did not qualify for the final.

Competing in Monaco at the 2023 Herculis, part of the 2023 Diamond League, on 21 July 2023, she broke the French national record for the mile run of 4:26.68, set the previous month by Alice Finot, in running 4:26.06.

She ran 4:34.31 to set a new French national record in the road mile on 1 October 2023 at the World Road Running Championships in Riga, Latvia, finishing in seventh place overall.

In December 2023, she won a gold medal in the mixed cross country relay race at the 2023 European Cross Country Championships in Brussels, Belgium, alongside Antoine Senard, Sarah Madeleine, and Alexis Miellet.

She suffered a twisted ankle on the track in the pre-race warm up during the 2024 European Athletics Championships in Rome, Italy, which ruled her out of competing at the 2024 Paris Olympics.

She was runner-up to Agathe Guillemot in the 1500 metres at the 2025 French Indoor Athletics Championships in February 2025. She was selected for the 2025 European Athletics Indoor Championships in Appeldoorn, where she qualified for the final of the 1500 metres, placing ninth overall.

She was runner-up to Agathe Guillemot in the 1500 metres at the 2026 French Indoor Athletics Championships in Aubiere. On 7 June, she placed third over 800 metres at the 2026 Bauhausgalan in Stockholm. She ran a new personal best of 4:03.58 for 1500 metres on 28 June at the 2026 Meeting de Paris.

== Personal life ==
From Saint-Sulpice-des-Rivoires she attended the University of Indianapolis. She has a degree in psychology and a masters degree in business administration. She has a Latvian grandmother.
