= Edibe Yağız =

Turkish runner (born 2006)

Personal information
- Born: 20 January 2006 (age 20)

Sport
- Sport: Athletics
- Event(s): Long-distance running, Cross country running
Medal record
Women's athletics
Representing Turkey
European U20 Championships
Silver medal – second place	2025 Tampere	5000 m
European U18 Championships
Bronze medal – third place	2022 Jerusalem	3000 m
European Youth Olympic Festival
Silver medal – second place	2022 Banská Bystrica	3000 m

Edibe Yağız (born 20 January 2006) is a Turkish long-distance and cross country runner. She is a member of Fenerbahçe S.K. and has won European age-group medals over 3000 metres and 5000 metres.

== Career ==
She began to be coached by Münir Akkoyun at the age of 14 years-old. won bronze medals at the Balkan Under-18 Athletics Championships held in Montenegro in June 2022 at the age of 16 years-old. She finished in second place in the women’s 3000 meters at the 2022 European Youth Summer Olympic Festival. She was a bronze medalist over 3000 metres at the 2022 European Athletics U18 Championships in Jerusalem, Israel behind Sofia Thøgersen and Jess Bailey.

She won the under-20 women's race at the Balkan Cross Country Championship held in Bulgaria in November 2023 and was subsequently selected for the 2023 European Cross Country Championships in Belgium.

Running as a member of Fenerbahçe S.K. she was a runner-up at the European Champion Clubs Cup Cross Country junior race in 2024 as the team won the team competition. Later that year she placed fourteenth in the U20 race at the 2024 European Cross Country Championships in Antalya. In 2025, she was a member of the Fenerbache team which retained the U20 women's European Champion Clubs Cup Cross Country title.

In August 2025, she was a silver medalist behind Innes Fitzgerald over 5000 metres at the 2025 European Athletics U20 Championships in Tampere, Finland. She ran a personal best time of 15:43.60 to edge ahead of Germany's Julia Ehrle for the silver medal. Later in the championships she also had a fourth place finish in the 3000 metres. She was selected for the 2025 European Cross Country Championships in Portugal, placing fifth in the women's U20 race.
