= Alexandra Millard =

British runner (born 2001)

Personal information
- Nationality: British
- Born: 31 December 2001 (age 24)

Sport
- Sport: Track and field
- Events: Middle distance, long distance, Cross country running

Achievements and titles
- Personal bests: 1500m: 4:06.91 (Poznan, 2025); 3000m: 8:45.82 (Cork, 2025); 5000m: 15:02.64 (Oordegem, 2025); 5km (road): 15:27 (Battersea, 2025)
Medal record
Representing Great Britain
World Cross Country Championships
Bronze medal – third place	2024 Belgrade	Mixed relay
European Cross Country Championships
Gold medal – first place	2023 Brussels	U23 Team
Gold medal – first place	2022 Turin	U23 Team
Bronze medal – third place	2022 Turin	U23 race

Alexandra Millard (born 31 December 2001) is a British middle distance, long distance, and cross country runner.

== Early life ==
From Kent, she attended St Edmund's School Canterbury. She was a student at Loughborough University before enrolling at Providence College in Rhode Island.

== Career ==
She was a bronze medalist in the women's U23 race and gold in the women's U23 team event at the 2022 European Cross Country Championships in Turin.

In February 2023, she was selected to compete for Great Britain in the mixed relay alongside competing alongside Callum Elson, Alex Bell and Joe Wigfield at the 2023 World Athletics Cross Country Championships in Bathurst, New South Wales, as the British team placed sixth overall. In July 2023, she ran a personal best over 1500 metres of 4:11.67 at the 2023 European Athletics U23 Championships in Espoo.

She was selected for the 2023 European Cross Country Championships in Brussels in December 2023. She won gold as part of the successful British squad which won the U23 team event.

In March 2024, she was a bronze medalist in the mixed relay at the 2024 World Cross Country Championships in Belgrade. In November 2024, she was part of the Providence team which finished third in the 2024 NCAA Division I Cross Country Championships.

On 2 August, she finished fourth in the final of the 5000 metres at the 2025 UK Athletics Championships in Birmingham. She turned professional with New Balance.

On 31 December 2025, Millard ran a 15:27 personal best on the road at the Battersea 5K, placing third. Millard was selected for the mixed relay at the 2026 World Athletics Cross Country Championships in Tallahassee, placing seventh overall alongside George Couttie, Adam Fogg and India Weir on 10 January 2026. On 24 January 2026, she ran 3000 metres in an indoor personal best of 8:48.69 at the New Balance Indoor Grand Prix in Boston.
