= David Stone (runner) =

British athlete (born 2002)

Personal information
- Nationality: Great Britain
- Born: 26 January 2002 (age 24)

Sport
- Sport: Athletics
- Event: Cross Country running

Achievements and titles
- Personal best: 5000m: 14:51.96 (2021)
Medal record
Men's athletics
Representing Great Britain
European Cross Country Championships
| Bronze medal – third place | 2024 Antalya | U23 race |
| Gold medal – first place | 2024 Antalya | U23 team |

David Stone (born 26 January 2002) is a British runner. He was a bronze medalist in the individual U23 race and gold medalist in the team U23 event at the 2024 European Cross Country Championships.

== Career ==
He is from Hendon, and is a member of Shaftesbury Barnet Harriers. He trains at the University of Birmingham alongside compatriot Will Barnicoat. In 2022, he placed second behind Will Barnicoat in their age-group race at the British National Cross Country Championships. His progress was stalled after the discovery of neuroendocrine tumours in the lining of his bowel which required surgery. Additionally, in 2023 he suffered an injury that would require two surgeries.

He won the U23 race at the Liverpool Cross Challenge ahead of Barnicoat in November 2024. He was subsequently selected for the European Cross Country Championships, in which he won bronze in the individual U23 race and gold in the team race.
