= Chloe Thomas (runner) =

Canadian long-distance runner

Personal information
- Born: 17 October 2003 (age 22)

Sport
- Sport: Athletics
- Event(s): Long distance running, Cross country running

Chloe Thomas (born 17 October 2003) is a Canadian long-distance and cross country runner.

== Biography ==
From Dundas, Ontario, Thomas competed in figure skating before taking up running in 2019. Thomas trained at the Hamilton Olympic Club under head coach Patti Moore. She went on to compete for the University of Connecticut.

In 2024, Thomas set a Canadian national U23 indoor record of 15:17.47 for the 5000 metres which stood for a year until broken by Jadyn Keeler. In November 2024, Thomas won the Northeast Regional Cross Country Championships in Contoocook, New Hampshire, ahead of Phoebe Anderson and Kimberley May, before placing ninth in the 2024 NCAA Cross Country Championships. That month, she was named the USTFCCCA Northeast Region Athlete of the Year for 2024.

Thomas agreed a transfer to compete for the University of Washington in 2025. She placed fourth over 5000 metres at the 2025 NACAC Championships in Freeport, The Bahamas in August 2025.

In January 2026, she was selected to compete as a member of the Canadian team at the 2026 World Athletics Cross Country Championships. On 10 January 2026, she placed 31st overall at the Championships in Tallahassee. At the 2026 Big Ten Championships in Indianapolis, Thomas placed third in the 3000m, running an indoor personal best of 8:56.54. She ran 16:04.58 for the 5000 m on 13 March at the 2026 NCAA Indoor Championships. In May, Thomas won the women's 10,000 meters in 32:59.51 at the Big Ten Championships. In June, she qualified for the 5000m and 10,000m at the 2026 NCAA Outdoor Championships.
