= Tomer Tarragano =

British athlete (born 2001)

Personal information
- Born: 4 January 2001 (age 25)

Sport
- Sport: Athletics
- Event: Long distance running

Achievements and titles
- Personal bests: 1500m: 3:42.09 (2024); 3000m: 7:59.50 (2024); 5000m: 13:44.62 (2024)
Medal record
Men's Athletics
Representing Great Britain
European Cross Country Championships
Bronze medal – third place	2024 Antalya	Team

Tomer Tarragano (born 4 January 2001) is a British long distance and cross country runner.

== Biography ==
A member of Brighton and Hove Athletics Club, he represented Great Britain at the under-23 level at the Euro Cross Country Championships in both 2022 and 2023. In 2023, he won the British Universities and Colleges Sport (BUCS) title over 10,000 metres.

He won the British Team European Cross Country Trials in Liverpool on November 23, 2024. He was subsequently selected for the British team for the 2024 European Cross Country Championships in Antalya, Turkey, where he was a bronze medalist in the team race. On 31 December 2024, he pipped Tom Keen in a photo finish to win the Battersea New Year's Eve 5k in London.

In January 2025, he had a top-ten finish at the Cross Internacional Juan Muguerza in Elgoibar. At the beginning of February 2025, he won the BUCS cross country title in Cardiff. He won the men’s race at the Comeback 5000 in Battersea on 13 May 2025.

Competing in the United States for the University of North Carolina, he qualified over 10,000 metres for the 2026 NCAA Outdoor Championships.

== Personal life ==
His father’s family are Spanish, from the town of Tarragona. He studied at the University of Birmingham.
