= Will Barnicoat =

British athlete (born 2003)

Personal information
- Nationality: Great Britain
- Born: William Charles Greathead Barnicoat; 24 March 2003 (age 23) Guildford
- Height: 5'11

Sport
- Sport: Athletics
- Event: 5000m

Achievements and titles
- Personal bests: 5000m: 13:19.66 (Paris, 2024)
Medal record
Men's athletics
Representing Great Britain
European U23 Championships
| Bronze medal – third place | 2025 Bergen | 5000m |
| Bronze medal – third place | 2023 Espoo | 5000m |
European Cross Country Championships
| Gold medal – first place | 2022 Turin | U20 race |
| Gold medal – first place | 2022 Turin | U20 Team |
| Gold medal – first place | 2023 Brussels | U23 race |
| Gold medal – first place | 2023 Brussels | U23 team |
| Gold medal – first place | 2024 Antalya | U23 race |
| Gold medal – first place | 2024 Antalya | U23 team |

Will Barnicoat (born 24 March 2003) is a British track and field athlete and cross country runner. He was European U20 cross country champion in 2022, and became European U23 cross country champion in 2023 and 2024.

== Early and personal life ==
Barnicoat runs for Aldershot, Farnham and District Athletics Club. He attended the University of Birmingham, where he was a contemporary of athletes Axel Vang Christensen and David Stone. As a student, Barnicoat supplemented his income working as a pot washer at a branch of Gourmet Burger Kitchen. He won his first vest for Great Britain aged 16, running in the European Cross Country Championships in Lisbon in December 2019.

== Career ==
=== 2022 ===
In February 2022, he became the English National junior cross-country champion for the second time, having also been U17 champion before that. Later that year, he won the 2022 European Cross Country Championships U20 race in Turin.

=== 2023 ===
He was a bronze medallist in the 2023 European Athletics U23 Championships – Men's 5000 metres in Espoo. In December 2023, he won the 2023 European Cross Country Championships U23 race in Brussels. He also claimed gold as part of the British squad which won the U23 team event.

=== 2024 ===
In March 2024, he was named in the senior British team for the 2024 World Athletics Cross Country Championships in Serbia, where he finished 27th (the highest British men's finish since Mo Farah in 2010). In May 2024, he won the British Universities and Colleges Sport (BUCS) 5000 metres. In July he ran a personal best of 13:19.66 in Paris, the third fastest outdoor U23 British 5000m time.

In November 2024, he was named by British Athletics on the Olympic Futures Programme for 2025. He won gold in the U23 individual and with the British U23 team at the 2024 European Cross Country Championships in Antalya, Turkey.

=== 2025-present ===
In March, at the Podium 5K Festival he was the fastest Briton and ran the 5th fastest 5K road time in British history (13:29). In May he successfully defended his British University Championships 5000m title. He won the bronze medal in the 5000 metres at the 2025 European Athletics U23 Championships in Bergen, finish 0.31 behind the silver medalist Nick Griggs of Ireland with Niels Laros of the Netherlands winning gold. He finished fourth over 5000 metres at the 2025 UK Athletics Championships in Birmingham on 3 August 2025. In October 2025, he was retained on the British Athletics Olympic Futures Programme for 2025/26.

Despite being troubled by an Achilles injury, he ran at the 2025 European Cross Country Championships where Barnicoat was the second British finisher as the British U23 team placed fourth overall.

In October 2026, he was retained on the 2026/27 Olympic Futures Programme awarded by UK Athletics.
