= John Heymans =

Belgian middle-distance runner

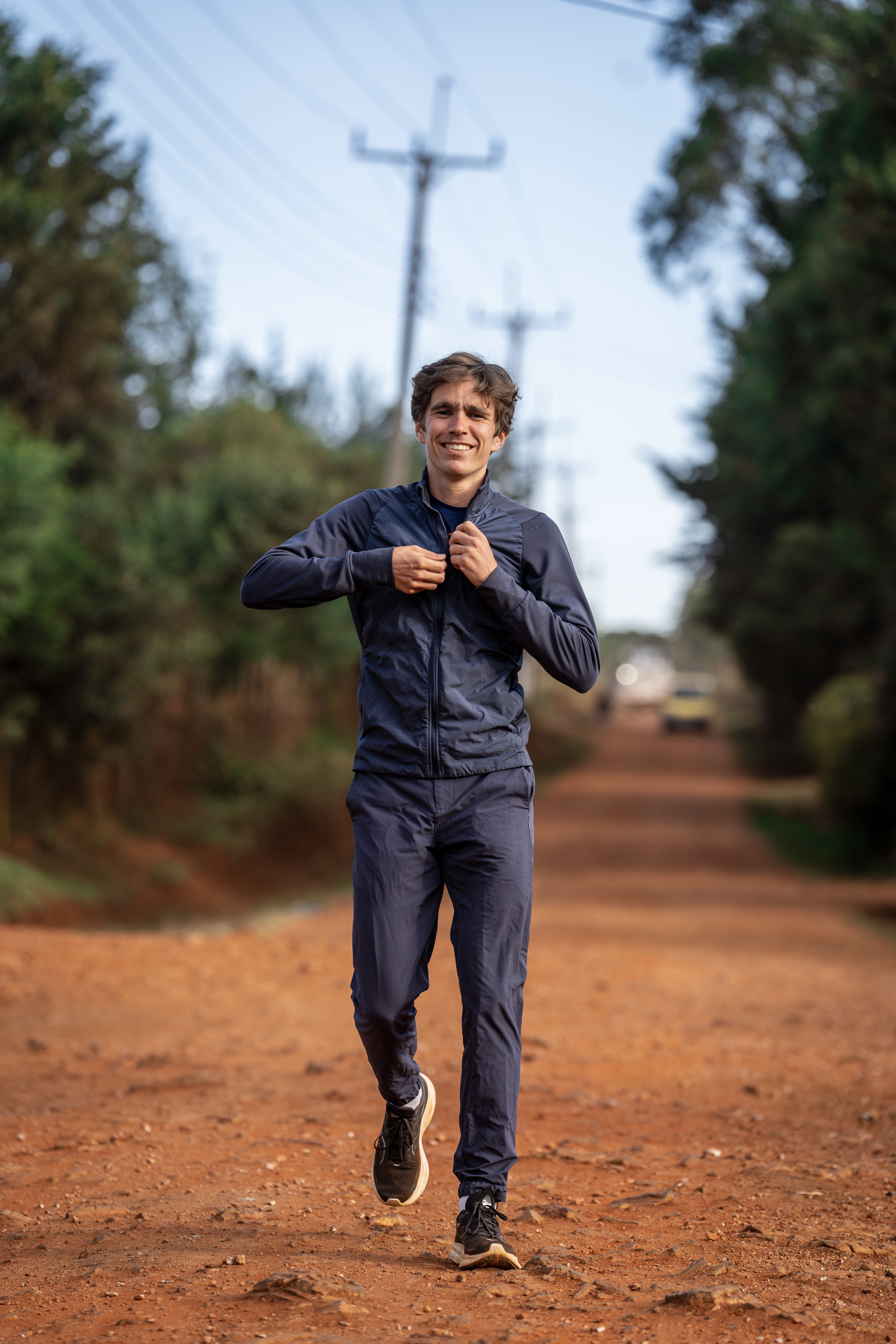

Personal information
- Nationality: Belgian
- Born: 9 January 1998 (age 28)

Sport
- Country: Belgium
- Sport: Track and field
- Event(s): 1500 metres, 3000 metres, 5000 metres
- Club: Royal Excelsior Sports Club Brussels
- Coached by: Wim Wouters

Achievements and titles
- Personal bests: 1500 metres: 3:40.07 (Oordegem 2023); 5000 metres: 13:14.16 (Montgeron 2023); Indoor; 3000 metres: 7:41.59 (Liéven 2024); 5000 metres: 13:03.46 NR (Boston 2024)
Medal record
Men's athletics
Representing Belgium
European Cross Country Championships
Silver medal – second place	2024 Antalya	Senior team

John Heymans (born 9 January 1998) is a Belgian long-distance runner. He has won two national titles (3000 metres indoor and cross-country in 2021). He is a member of Royal Excelsior Club Brussels. After finishing his MSc in Bioengineering and Nanotechnology from the KU Leuven in September 2022, he decided to become a professional athlete.

== Early life ==
John Heymans was born in Vilvoorde, Belgium on January 9, 1998. He grew up in the town of Rossem, province of Flemish Brabant. As a teenager Heymans played national-level hockey but took up competitive running in 2016. In his first year in college he combined both sports, but soon decided to focus completely on running.

== Running career ==
On 10 December 2017, at the age of 19, Heymans participated as a junior in the European Cross Country Championships in Samorín, Slovakia. He finished 24th, 31 seconds behind winner Jakob Ingebrigtsen from Norway. Team Belgium got 4th place in the Junior team ranking that year.

In 2019, Heymans returned to the European Cross Country Championships, held on 8 December 2019 in Lisbon, Portugal. He finished in 24th position in the Under-23 race, 1'13" behind winner Jimmy Gressier from France. Team Belgium ranked 6th in the U-23 category. On 16 August 2020, Heymans finished 6th in the 1500m at the Belgian National Championships in Brussels, Belgium in a time of 3:51.51.

Heymans took his first national title on 20 February 2021, when he won the 3000m race at the Belgian National Indoor Championships in 7:51.57. With his winning time Heymans qualified for the European Championships in Toruń, Poland, where he finished 7th in the heats in a time of 7:58.13.

Only one week later, on 28 February 2021, Heymans won his second national title at the Belgian National Championships cross country in Laken, Belgium.

Heymans had a difficult 2021 season with stress fractures and COVID-19 infections. Nevertheless, without much preparation Heymans managed to place 6th at the 2022 Belgian National Cross Country Championships in Brussels on 6 March 2022.

After he finished his studies in September 2022, Heymans turned professional.

Heymans returned to the European Cross Country Championships in Turin, Italy on 11 December 2022. In the first couple of laps, Heymans stayed close to the front runners. In the middle part of the race Heymans lost some ground, but came back strong in the final lap, passing three competitors to finish in 14th place, his best European Cross Country Championships ranking up to that date. Team Belgium ranked 4th in the teams competition.

On 5 February 2023 at the IFAM Gent Indoor in the Topsporthal Vlaanderen, Heymans finished second in a time of 7:45.48 in the 3000 metres, six seconds faster than his personal best from 2021.

At the Meeting Metz Moselle Athlelor on 11 February 2023, Heymans finished third in 7:42.55 in the 3000 metres beating his best from the week before by another three seconds. With this time, Heymans qualified for the 2023 European Indoor Championships, held from 2 to 5 March 2023 at the Ataköy Arena in Istanbul.

At the BU John Thomas Terrier Classic in Boston, United States on 26 January 2024, Heymans broke the national indoor record for the 5000 metres in a time of 13:03:46, beating the Olympic entry standard of 13:05.00, and qualified for the 2024 Summer Olympics. At those Olympic Games, he finished 11th in the final of the men's 5000 metres.

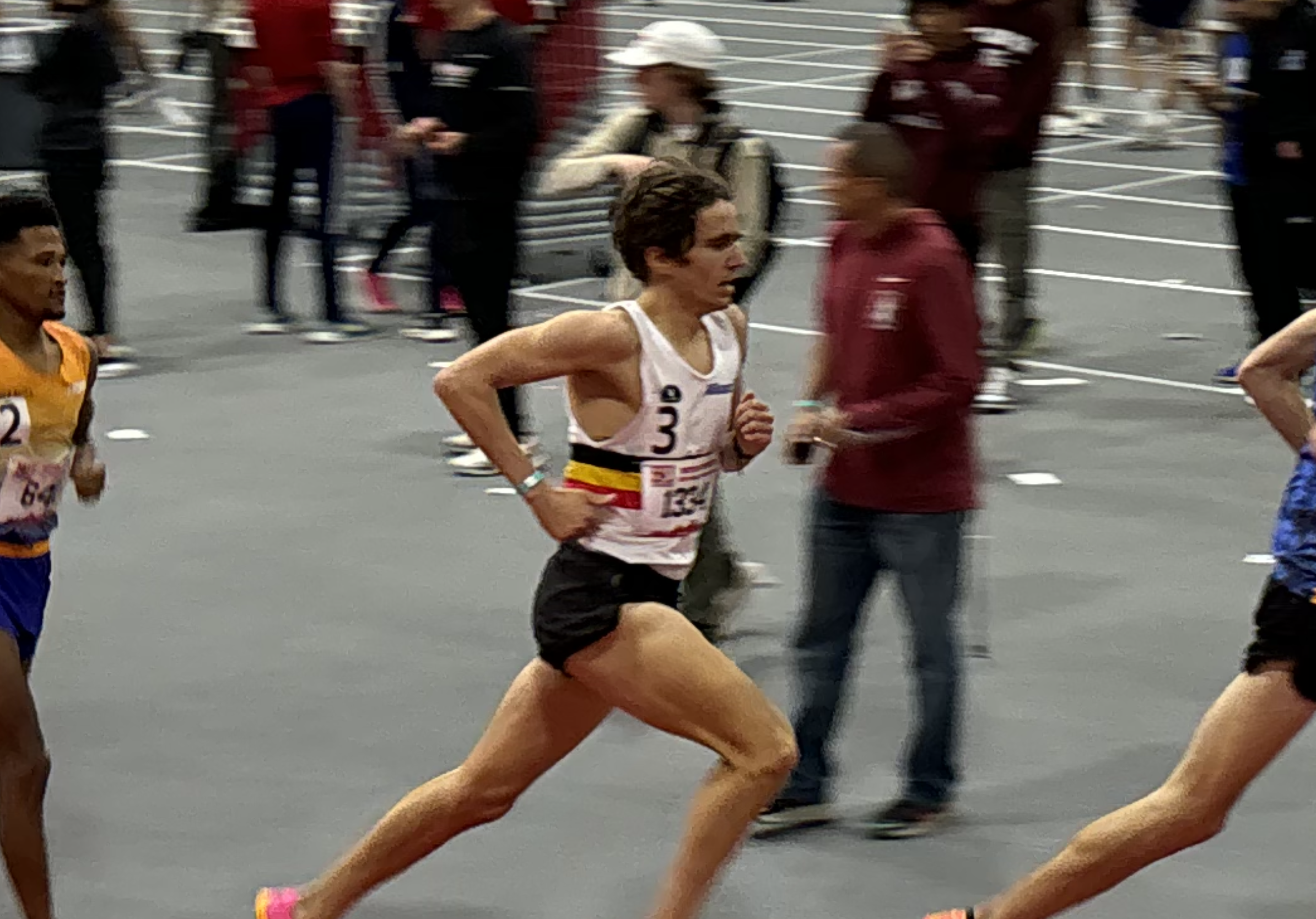
Heymans at the John Thomas terrier Classic in 2024.

In December 2024, he picked up a silver medal with the Belgium men's team at the 2024 European Cross Country Championships in Antalya, Turkey.

On 31 January 2025, Heymans returned to Boston, United States to run an indoor 5000 metres at the BU John Terrier Classic, where he finished 5th in a time of 13:08.93, in a race that was won by Jimmy Gressier from France in 13:00.54.

== Achievements ==
=== International competitions ===
Year	Competition	Venue	Position	Event	Time
Representing Belgium
2017	European Cross Country Championships	Šamorín, Slovakia	24th	U20 race (6 km)	19:10
2019	European Cross Country Championships	Lisbon, Portugal	24th	U23 race (8 km)	25:30
2021	European Athletics Indoor Championships	Toruń, Poland	N/A	3000 m	DQ
2022	European Cross Country Championships	Venaria Reale, Italy	14th	Senior race (10 km)	30:21
2023	European Athletics Indoor Championships	Bakırköy, Turkey	17th (h)	3000 m	7:57.87
2023	World Championships	Budapest, Hungary	26th (h)	5000 m	13:39.67
2023	European Cross Country Championships	Brussels, Belgium	8th	Senior race (10 km)	30:34
2024	World Indoor Championships	Glasgow, United Kingdom	8th	3000 m	7:48.18
2024	Olympic Games	Saint-Denis, France	11th (f)	5000 m	13:19.25
2025	European Indoor Championships	Apeldoorn, Netherlands	22nd (h)	3000 m	7:59.36
2025	World Championships	Tokyo, Japan	31st (h)	5000 m	13:47.37

=== Personal bests ===
- 1500 metres – 3:38.19 (Brussels 2024)
- 3000 metres – 7:41.59i (Liévin 2024)
- 5000 metres – 13:03:46i (Boston 2024)
