= Phoebe Anderson =

British athlete (born 2002)

Personal information
- Nationality: Scottish (British)
- Born: 23 June 2002 (age 24)

Sport
- Sport: Athletics
- Event: Long distance running

Achievements and titles
- Personal best(s): 1500m: 4:20.69 (2025); 3000m: 9:15.84 (2025); 5000m: 15:24.63 (2025)
Medal record
Women's athletics
Representing Great Britain
European Cross Country Championships
Silver medal – second place	2025 Lagoa	Team
Gold medal – first place	2024 Antalya	U23 race
Gold medal – first place	2024 Antalya	U23 team
Bronze medal – third place	2021 Dublin	U20 Team

Phoebe Anderson (born 23 June 2002) is a British long-distance and cross country runner who also represents Scotland internationally. She was a silver medalist with the British team at the 2025 European Cross Country Championships having previously won the individual and team U23 races in 2024.

== Early life ==
She was educated at Wycombe Abbey in High Wycombe, Buckinghamshire.

== Career ==
She was a bronze medalist in the U20 team race at the 2021 European Cross Country Championships in Dublin.

She is a member of the Herne Hill Harriers. She set a club senior women's record for the 5000 metres in March 2023, running 15:44.97 in Raleigh, North Carolina.

Running for Columbia University she was a 4-time All-American. She won the individual Ivy League Women's Cross Country Championship in November 2024. She was second to Chloe Thomas at the Northeast Regional championships before competing in the 2024 NCAA Division I Cross Country Championships, placing 26th.

She was a gold medalist in both the individual U23 race and team U23 race at the 2024 European Cross Country Championships in Antalya, Turkey in December 2024.

She was selected for the British team for the European Running Championships in Leuven, Belgium, in April 2025. In the 10 km race she finished in 32nd place overall, in a time of 32:52. She ran a 9:15.64 over 3000 metres in Birmingham in June 2025. She was named in the British team for the 2025 Summer World University Games in Germany, placing fourth over 5000 metres.

On 2 August, she finished eighth in the final of the 5000 metres at the 2025 UK Athletics Championships in Birmingham in 15:57.18.

Wearing the Scottish national vest, Anderson had a fourth-place finish in the senior women's race at the 2025 Liverpool Cross Challenge on 22 November to gain automatic selection for the 2025 European Cross Country Championships. On her senior debut, she was the second Brit home after Megan Keith to help the British team win the silver medal in the team event. That month, she was named in the British team for the 2026 World Athletics Cross Country Championships in Tallahassee, where she placed 35th on 10 January 2026.

== Personal life ==
Anderson is eligible to represent Scotland through her parents.
