= George Couttie =

British athlete (born 2005)

Personal information
- Born: 15 January 2005 (age 21)

Sport
- Sport: Athletics
- Event: Middle distance running

Achievements and titles
- Personal best(s): 800m: 1:51.15 (Watford, 2025); 1500m: 3:36.40 (London, 2025); Mile: 3:52.02 (Salem, 2026); 3000m: 7:36.74 (Boston, 2025); 5000m: 13:58.32 (Fairfax, 2025)
Medal record
Men's athletics
Representing Great Britain
European Cross Country Championships
Silver medal – second place	2024 Antalya	U20 race

George Couttie (born 15 January 2005) is a British runner. He was runner up in the mile run at the 2026 NCAA Indoor Championships and in the U20 race at the 2024 European Cross Country Championships.

== Biography ==
From Harrogate, in 2023, he was the winner of the senior boys race at the English Schools' AA Cross Country Championships.

He qualified for the final of the 1500 metres at the 2024 World Athletics U20 Championships in Lima, Peru in August 2024. After spending a year in the United States at the University of Charleston, Couttie moved to train under the guidance of Ben Thomas, the coach behind 1500m Olympic champion Cole Hocker, at Virginia Tech in 2024.

He won NCAA Division I Southeast Regional men's cross-country individual race prior to finishing 14th in the NCAA cross country championships in November 2024. He was runner-up behind Niels Laros in the men's U20 race at the 2024 European Cross Country Championships in Antalya, Turkey.

On 2 August, he qualified for the final of the 1500 metres at the 2025 UK Athletics Championships in Birmingham, placing sixth overall in 3:47.84. On 31 October, he placed fourth in the ACC conference cross country race over 8 km for Virginia Tech. On 22 November, he had a top-ten finish at the 2025 NCAA Cross Country Championships in Missouri. On 6 December, he lowered his personal best indoors over 3000 metres to 7:36.74 in Boston.

On 10 January 2026, he competed in the British mixed relay team at the 2026 World Athletics Cross Country Championships in Tallahassee, Florida, placing seventh overall, alongside India Weir, Alexandra Millard and Adam Fogg.

On 23 January 2026, competing for Virginia Tech at the Hokie Invitational, Couttie ran 4:57.81 to break the 2000 metres indoors collegiate record of 5:03.74 set by Drew Bosley. On 14 February, Couttie ran the mile in 3:52.02 at the Sound Invitational. He placed second in the mile run at the 2026 NCAA Indoor Championships on 14 March 2026 in 3:59.30. Competing at the NCAA East Regional in Lexington, Kentucky on 29 May, he ran 3:38.33 for the 1500 metres to qualify for the 2026 NCAA Outdoor Championships, where he ran the 1500 m in 3:36.99 without advancing to the final. In June, he qualified for the final of the 1500 metres at the 2026 British Championships.
