= 2023 European Athletics U23 Championships – Men's 5000 metres =

Men's 5000 metres at the 2023 European Athletics U23 Championships
- Venue: Leppävaara Stadium
- Location: Espoo, Finland
- Dates: 14 July
- Competitors: 21 from 12 nations
- Winning time: 13:35.07

Medalists
gold medal	Charles Hicks	Great Britain
silver medal	Eemil Helander	Finland
bronze medal	Will Barnicoat	Great Britain

The men's 5000 metres event at the 2023 European Athletics U23 Championships was held in Espoo, Finland, at Leppävaara Stadium on 14 July.

== Records ==
Prior to the competition, the records were as follows:

European U23 record	Jakob Ingebrigtsen (NOR)	12:48.45	Florence, Italy	10 June 2021
Championship U23 record	Ali Kaya (TUR)	13:20.16	Tallinn, Estonia	11 July 2015

== Results ==
Place	Athlete	Nation	Time	Notes
1st place, gold medalist(s)	Charles Hicks	Great Britain	13:35.07	
2nd place, silver medalist(s)	Eemil Helander	Finland	13:40.15	
3rd place, bronze medalist(s)	Will Barnicoat	Great Britain	13:45.24	
4	Derebe Ayele	Israel	13:47.92	
5	Loic Scomparin	France	13:49.60	
6	Adam Maijó Frígola	Spain	13:50.77	
7	Henry McLuckie	Great Britain	13:52.11	
8	Jaime Migallon	Spain	13:52.38	
9	Francesco Guerra	Italy	13:52.65	
10	Shay McEvoy	Ireland	13:52.76	
11	Ateka Demisie	Israel	13:54.41	
12	Rogério Amaral	Portugal	13:55.77	
13	Vebjørn Hovdejord	Norway	14:05.94	
14	Callum Morgan	Ireland	14:14.73	
15	Sebastian Frey	Austria	14:22.23	
16	Sven Wagner	Germany	14:23.89	
17	Jonathan Carmin	Israel	14:24.31	
18	Mustafe Muuse	Finland	14:33.68	
19	Rúben Amaral	Portugal	14:36.83	
—	Abdullahi Dahir Rabi	Norway	DNF	
—	Joel Ibler Lillesø	Denmark	DNF	
