= Jess Bailey =

British athlete (born 2006)

Personal information
- Born: 2 August 2006 (age 20)

Sport
- Sport: Athletics
- Event: Long distance running
Medal record
Women's athletics
Representing Great Britain
European Cross Country Championships
Gold medal – first place	2023 Brussels	U20 team
Gold medal – first place	2024 Antalya	U20 team
Silver medal – second place	2024 Antalya	U20 race
European U18 Championships
Silver medal – second place	2022 Jerusalem	3000m

Jess Bailey (born 2 August 2006) is a British runner. She won the U20 race at the 2021 World Mountain and Trail Running Championships.

== Early life ==
From Cumbria, she attended Ulverston Victoria High School in Ulverston.

== Career ==
Bailey won the 2021 Girls' U17 London Mini Marathon. She won the silver medal over 3000 metres at the 2022 European Athletics U18 Championships in Jerusalem, Israel, in July 2022 finishing behind Sofia Thøgersen and ahead of Turkish runner Edibe Yağız in the medal positions. She won individual and team golds in the U20 mountain races at the 2021 World Mountain and Trail Running Championships in Chiang Mai, Thailand in November 2022, finishing ahead of compatriot Rebecca Flaherty in the individual race.

Bailey placed eighth in the individual race and won the team gold medal with Great Britain alongside Innes FitzGerald and Lizzie Wellsted in the U20 race at the 2023 European Cross Country Championships in Brussels.

Bailey finished eighth in the 3000 metres at the 2024 World Athletics U20 Championships in Lima, Peru in August 2024. She set a new British U20 5 km road record in Barrowford in November 2024, running 15:25 to take seven seconds off the previous mark set by Innes FitzGerald.

On 23 November 2024, she finished runner-up to FitzGerald in the junior women's race at the Liverpool Cross Challenge. She was subsequently selected for the British U20 team for the 2024 European Cross Country Championships in Antalya, Turkey, winning silver in the individual race behind FitzGerald, with both winning gold medals in the team event.

At the beginning of February 2025, she won the British Universities and Colleges Sport (BUCS) cross country title. She finished fourth over 3000 metres at the 2025 British Indoor Athletics Championships in Birmingham, on 23 February 2025. She ran a 8:55.00 to win over 3000 metres in Birmingham in June 2025.

== Personal life ==
She attends the University of Birmingham.
