= Kıyasettin Kara =

Turkish athlete (born 2006)

Personal information
- Born: 8 August 2006 (age 19)

Sport
- Sport: Athletics
- Event(s): Steeplechase, Middle-distance running

Achievements and titles
- Personal best(s): 800m: 1:53.84 (Izmir, 2025); 1500m: 3:41.23 NU20R (Izmir, 2025); 3000m: 8:04.58 (Istanbul, 2025); 5000m: 14:02.48 (Izmir, 2025); 3000m S'chase: 8:43.55 NU20R (Tampere, 2025)
Medal record
Men's athletics
Representing TUR
European U20 Championships
Gold medal – first place	2025 Tampere	3000 m steeplechase

Kıyasettin Kara (born 8 August 2006) is a Turkish steeplechase, middle-distance and cross country runner. He won the 3000 metres steeplechase at the 2025 European Athletics U20 Championships, setting a Turkish under-20 record. He also became the Turkish under-20 record holder that year in the 1500 meters.

== Career ==
From Kayseri, Kara trained as a member of the Turkish Olympic Preparation Centre (TOHM). Kara later became a member of Fenerbache athletics club. In 2023, Kara broke the Turkish record in the U18 3000 meters, with a time of 8.14.51. He won the Turkish schools cross country title in February 2024.

Kara won the gold medal in the 3000 metres steeplechase at the 2025 European Athletics U20 Championships in Tampere, Finland. His time of 8:43.55, also breaking the U20 Turkish record. In August 2025, Kara also set a new U20 Turkish record over 1500 metres with a time of 3:41.23. Kara was selected to represent Turkey at the 2025 European Cross Country Championships in Portugal.
