= Andreas Fjeld Halvorsen =

Norwegian runner (born 2005)

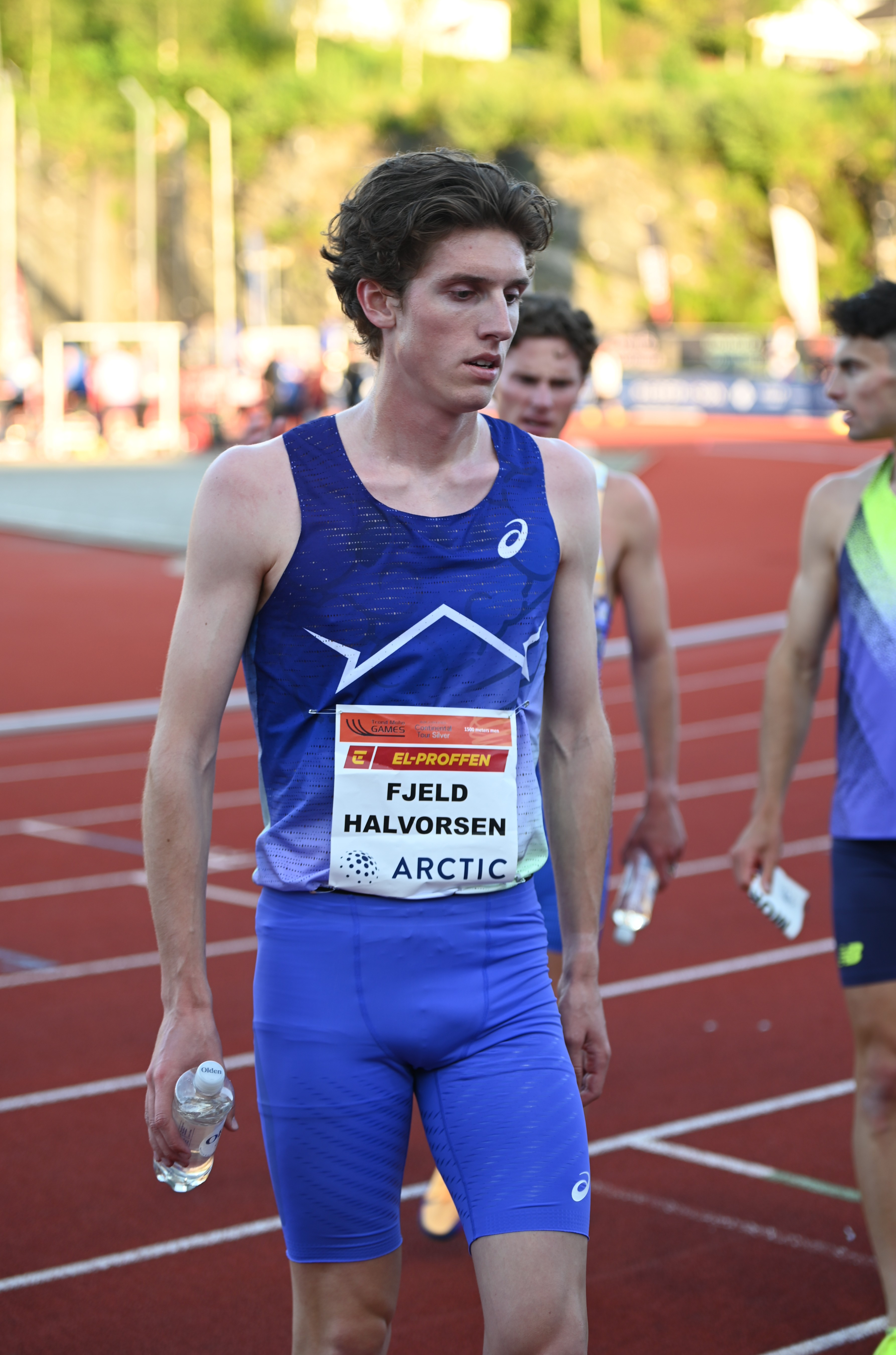
- Andreas Fjeld Halvorsen in 2026

Personal information
- Nationality: Norwegian
- Born: 14 September 2005 (age 21)

Sport
- Sport: Athletics
- Events: Middle distance, long distance running, cross country running

Achievements and titles
- Personal bests: 800m: 1:50.85 (Nittedal, 2024); 1500m: 3:34.33 (Pfungstadt, 2025); 3000m: 7:47.07 (Trier, 2023) NU20R; 5000m: 13:22.38 (Stockholm, 2025)
Medal record
Men's athletics
Representing Norway
World U20 Championships
Gold medal – first place	2024 Lima	3000m
European U18 Championships
Silver medal – second place	2022 Jerusalem	1500m
Silver medal – second place	2022 Jerusalem	3000m
European Cross Country Championships
Gold medal – first place	2024 Antalya	U20 Team
Bronze medal – third place	2024 Antalya	U20 race

Andreas Fjeld Halvorsen (born 14 September 2005) is a Norwegian middle-, long-distance and cross country runner. He was a gold medalist at the 2024 World Athletics U20 Championships over 3000 metres. He became Norwegian indoor champion over 1500 metres and won the Nordic Cross Country Championships in 2025.

== Biography ==
He was a silver medalist at the 2022 European Athletics U18 Championships in both the 1500 metres and the 3000 metres in Jerusalem, Israel.

In August 2023, he became Norwegian under-20 champion over 1500 metres. In September 2023, he broke Jakob Ingebrigtsen's Norwegian junior record in the 3000 metres, running 7.47.04 in Trier.

In March 2024, he won Norwegian indoor U20 titles over 800 metres and 1500 metres, setting championship records in both distances. In June 2024, he was runner up to Jakob Ingebritsen at the Norwegian national championships over 1500 metres.

He won the gold medal in the 3000 metres at the 2024 World Athletics U20 Championships in Lima, Peru. In doing so, he became the first non-African man to win a long distance title at the championships since its inception in 1986.

In December 2024, he won the bronze medal in the individual U20 race and gold in the team race at the 2024 European Cross Country Championships in Antalya, Turkey. Combined with a senior victory for Jakob Ingebritsen, he helped Norway to a third place finish in the overall medal table for the Championship, for a second consecutive year. In 2024, he was nominated for the European Athletics Rising Star award.

He ran 3:42.26 to win the Norwegian Indoor Athletics Championships in February 2025, over 1500 metres. In August he placed third at the Norwegian Athletics Championships over 1500 metres, running 3:39.19. He won the senior Nordic Cross Country Championships in Kastrup, Denmark, on 9 November, whilst being at 20 years-of-age, the youngest athlete in the race.

In August 2026, he competed at the 2026 European Athletics Championships in Birmingham, England, in the 1500 metres. He placed third at the Monument Mile Classic in Stirling, Scotland, in September 2026.
