= Antoine Senard (runner) =

French athlete (born 2000)

Personal information
- Nationality: French
- Born: 2 February 2000 (age 26) Esneux, Liège, Belgium
- Height: 185 cm (6 ft 1 in)
- Weight: 67 kg (148 lb)

Sport
- Country: France
- Sport: Athletics
- Events: Middle-distance running; Cross country running

Achievements and titles
- Personal bests: 800m: 1:49.65 (Lokeren, 2024); 1500m: 3:36.07 (Ninove, 2024); 3000m: 7:40.18 (Leuven, 2024)
Medal record
Men's athletics
Representing France
World Cross Country Championships
Silver medal – second place	2026 Tallahassee	Mixed relay
European Cross Country Championships
Gold medal – first place	2023 Brussels	Mixed relay
Silver medal – second place	2024 Antalya	Mixed relay
Silver medal – second place	2022 Turin	U23 team
Bronze medal – third place	2021 Dublin	U23 team

Antoine Senard (born 2 February 2000) is a French middle-distance and cross country runner. He was a gold medal winner at the 2023 European Cross Country Championships in the mixed relay, and won a silver medal at the same championships in the mixed relay in 2024.

== Biography ==
Originally from Esneux in Belgium. He is a member of Seraing Athletics club in Seraing, Wallonia, and Entente Franconville in Val d'Oise in France.

In 2021, he became French indoor champion over 3000 metres at the French Indoor Athletics Championships in Miramas. He won a bronze medal in the men’s U23 team race at the 2021 European Cross Country Championships in Dublin.

He was a silver medalist in the men’s U23 team race at the 2022 European Cross Country Championships in Turin, Italy.

In December 2023, he won a gold medal for France in the mixed cross country relay race at the 2023 European Cross Country Championships in Brussels, Belgium, alongside compatriots Bérénice Cleyet-Merle, Sarah Madeleine, and Alexis Miellet.

He won a silver medal for the French mixed relay team at the 2024 European Cross Country Championships in Antalya, Turkey.

In February 2025, he finished in fourth place at the French Indoor Athletics Championships in the 3000 metres, in a time of 7:58.35. On 2 March 2025, he won his first cross country national title in the French Cross Country Championships on the short course, in Challans, running a time of 12:52.

Senard was selected to compete in the mixed team relay at the 2025 European Cross Country Championships in Lagoa, Portugal, in December 2025.

In January 2026, he represented France in the mixed relay at the 2026 World Athletics Cross Country Championships in Tallahassee, Florida, winning the silver medal.

== Personal life ==
He is the son of a French doctor and Belgian nurse, and has dual French and Belgian citizenship.
