= Lyla Belshaw =

British athlete (born 2007)

Personal information
- Born: 16 December 2007 (age 18)

Sport
- Sport: Athletics
- Event: Middle distance running

Achievements and titles
- Personal bests: 800m: 2:02.01 (Luzern, 2025); 1500m: 4:09.13 (Watford, 2025)
Medal record
Women's athletics
Representing Great Britain
European U20 Championships
Gold medal – first place	2025 Tampere	1500 m
European U18 Championships
Gold medal – first place	2024 Banská Bystrica	1500m
Representing England
Commonwealth Youth Games
Bronze medal – third place	2023 Port of Spain	1500 m

Lyla Belshaw (born 16 December 2007) is a British middle-distance runner. She was the gold medalist in her specialist event, the 1500 metres, at the 2024 European Athletics U18 Championships and the 2025 European Athletics U20 Championships.

== Early life ==
From Colchester in Essex, she attended Colchester County High School for Girls.

== Career ==
A member of the Colchester Harriers, she won her age-group Mini London Marathon in April 2023 as a 15 year-old. She was a bronze medalist in the 1500 metres at the 2023 Commonwealth Youth Games in Trinidad and Tobago with a personal best time of 4:16.37.

She won the gold medal in the 1500 metres at the 2024 European Athletics U18 Championships in Slovakia. In October 2024, she was nominated by Athletics Weekly for best British female junior.

On 25 July, she won the England Athletics U20 Championships title over 1500 metres with 4:18.19. She was named in the British team for the 1500 metres at the 2025 European Athletics U20 Championships in Tampere. She subsequently won the 1500 metres gold medal in Tampere, her second age-grade European title in two years, winning ahead of Carmen Cernjul of Sweden and compatriot Isobelle Jones in a time of 4:14.59. In October 2025, she was named on the British Athletics Olympic Futures Programme for 2025/26. She was again nominated for British under-20 female athlete of the year by Athletics Weekly in November 2025. Belshaw ran 2:04.85 indoors at Lee Valley in February 2026. In July, Belshaw finished runner-up to Phoebe Gill in the 800 metres final at the 2026 England Athletics U20 Championships. She was selected as part of the Great Britain team to compete at the 2026 World Athletics U20 Championships.

In October 2026, Belshaw was retained on the 2026/27 Olympic Futures Programme awarded by UK Athletics. That month, she joined M11 Track Club, to work with coaches Trevor Painter and Jenny Meadows.
