= Juan Zijderlaan =

Dutch long-distance runner

Personal information
- Born: 27 September 2005 (age 20)

Sport
- Sport: Athletics
- Events: Long-distance running, Cross country running

Achievements and titles
- Personal bests: 800m: 1:52.48 (2024); 1500m: 3:41.31 (2024); 3000m: 7:51.68 (2024); 5000m: 13:32.21 (2026); 10,000m: 30:24.67 (2025); Road; 5k: 13:28 (2026); 10k: 27:54 (2026) EU23R; 15k: 45:07 (2025); 10 miles: 48:48 (2025)
Medal record
Men's athletics
Representing NED
European Cross Country Championships
Silver medal – second place	2024 Antalya	U20 Team

Juan Zijderlaan (born 27 September 2005) is a Dutch middle- and long-distance and cross country runner. In 2026, he became the European under-23 record holder in the 10k run.

== Biography ==
From Polsbroek, he is a member of the Scorpio club based in Oosterhout. He had a fifth place in the 3000 meters at the 2022 European Athletics U18 Championships in Jerusalem.

He ran 14:02 for the 5000 metres distance in Oordegem in 2023. He began training with Dutch national coach Tomasz Lewandowski in September 2023, part of a group that contains his compatriots Stefan Nillessen, and Niels Laros. In December, he competed at the 2023 European Cross Country Championships in Brussels, placing nineteenth in the U20 category.

Competing over 5000 metres in Brussels in May 2024 as an 18-year-old, Zijderlaan got the qualifying mark for the World U20 Championships, with a time of 13:39.69 which moved him to second on the Dutch all-time U20 list. Five days after his run in Brussels he competed in Oslo setting a new personal best of 3:41.88 for the 1500 metres, another World U20 standard. In June, he placed sixth in the final of the 1500 metres at the senior Dutch Athletics Championships in 3:41.31. In August, he places tenth overall in the 5000 metres at the 2024 World Athletics U20 Championships in Lima, Peru. In December, he placed eighth in the U20 race at the 2024 European Cross Country Championships in Antalya, Turkey, winning a silver medal in the team event.

In 2025 in Schoorl, he improved his personal best in the 10k run to 28.13 but suffered an injury in the February which limited his ability to compete. That summer, returned to act as a pacemaker in a record attempt for his compatriot Diane van Es, and in July represented the Netherlands at the 2025 European Athletics U23 Championships in Bergen, Norway, but was below his usual level.

At the age of 20 years-old on 15 February 2026, he placed second in the 5k run in Monaco with a time of 13:28, finishing runner-up to his compatriot Tim Verbaandert who set a new Dutch national record. The following week, on 22 February 2026, Zijderlaan finished the 10K FACSA Castellon in Spain in a European U23 record for the 10k run of 27:54. Zijderlaan ran one second below his record time later that spring at the Urban Trail de Lille in France on 4 April. In July, he won over 1500 metres title at the Dutch Outdoor Championships.

== Personal life ==
His grandfather Jan Zijderlaan was also a distance runner. Alongside his athletics career, he is also studying Sports Science at the National Sports Centre Papendal. He is under contract with Nike.
