= Kamil Herzyk =

Polish athlete (born 2004)

Personal information
- Nationality: Polish
- Born: 14 April 2004 (age 22)

Sport
- Sport: Athletics
- Event: Middle-distance running

Achievements and titles
- Personal bests: 800m: 1:51.24 (2024); 1500m: 3:37.32 (2026); 3000m: 7:40.22 (2025) NR; 5000m: 13:31.72 (2025)

Kamil Herzyk (born 14 April 2004) is a Polish middle-distance runner. He is the Polish national record holder over 3000 metres, and has won the Polish Athletics Championships over 5000 metres and in the 5k run.

== Biography ==
From Bielsko, he is a member of Just Team Bielsko-Biała. He is coached by former runner Bożena Dziubińska. He is the Polish U23 record holder in the 3000 metres indoors.

Herzyk won the 5000 metres at the Polish Athletics Championships in Bydgoszcz in June 2024, running 14:02.09. He competed for Poland in the U23 race at the 2024 European Cross Country Championships in Antalya, Turkey.

Herzyk was runner-up to Filip Rak over 3000 metres at the Polish Indoor Athletics Championships in Toruń in February 2025. In June 2025, he represented Poland over 5000 metres at the 2025 European Athletics Team Championships First Division in Madrid, Spain, locks seventh overall in 13:51.91. In August, he won the 2025 Polish Championships in Bydgoszcz in 14:13.70. That summer, he also won the Polish U23 Championships over 5000m and won the Polish 5k run title, and finished in fourth place overall at the 2025 European Athletics U23 Championships in the 5000 metres, in Bergen, Norway. He set a new Polish national record of 7:40.22 for the 3000 metres in Germany in September 2025, breaking the record set by Bronislaw Malinowski in 1974.

Herzyk ran a personal best of 3:37.32 for the 1500 metres in Toruń in February 2026 at the Copernicus Cup. He was selected for the 2026 World Athletics Indoor Championships in Poland in March 2026, running the 1500 metres in 3:44.31 without advancing to the final. Herzyk set a Polish national U23 record of 28:40 for 10km at the Warsaw Independence Run on 11 November 2026, taking 22 seconds from the previous record set in 1994 by Piotr Gładki.
