= Kate Axford =

British athlete (born 1999)

- Axford in 2026

Personal information
- Born: 31 March 1999 (age 27) Bedford, England

Sport
- Sport: Athletics
- Event: Long distance running

Achievements and titles
- Personal bests: 5000m: 15:19.40 (Manchester, 2024)
Medal record
Women's Athletics
Representing Great Britain
European Cross Country Championships
Silver medal – second place	2024 Antalya	Team

Kate Axford (born 31 March 1999) is a British cross country and long distance runner, and former international field hockey player.

== Biography ==
=== Hockey ===
She played for Cambridge City in the Women's England Hockey League and represented England at under-16, under-18 and under-21 levels. She won bronze with England U21's in the European Championships in Valencia in 2017 and went on to play for Wimbledon Hockey Club in the Women's England Hockey League Premier Division. She became contracted to play for the senior Great Britain women's national field hockey team in 2022.

=== Athletics ===
==== 2023 ====
A hip injury caused her to retire from hockey and try competitive running, a sport she had competed in nine years earlier while at school. She joined Belgrave Harriers after being spotted by coaches at a 5 km race in Battersea Park. In April 2023, she won her first ever 5000m track race in a time of 15:48.79 at the Comeback 5000 event in Battersea. That year she also won the 3000m race on her Team England debut in Loughborough, again her debut over that distance. She placed eighth representing England at the Cross Italica in Seville in November 2023.

==== 2024 ====
She finished third in the 3000m at the UK Indoor Championships in Birmingham in February 2024, running a personal best 9:08.43. In June 2024, she ran 15:19.40 to finish fourth in the 5000m at the 2024 British Athletics Championships in Manchester.

In November 2024, she finished third at the Cardiff Cross Challenge, part of the World Athletics Cross Country Tour. Later that month, she won the senior women's title at the Liverpool Cross Challenge, which doubled up as the British trials for the European Cross Country Championship.

She was selected for the British team for the 2024 European Cross Country Championships in Antalya, Turkey where she finished tenth overall to help the British team to win the silver medal in the team race.

==== 2025-present ====
Axford ran the final leg in Mansfield as Belgrave Harriers won their third consecutive English Cross Country Association national relays title, with Axford ever-present across those victories.

On 18 September 2026, Axford set a personal best of 4:26.96 in the mile run at Athlos in London. Later that month, Axford equalled the women's course record of Katie Snowden in winning the UK and English One Mile Road Race titles at the Vitality Westminster Mile in London on 26 September, running 4:23 to finish ahead of defending champion Holly Dixon. On 8 November, Axford won the Cardiff Cross Challenge, a silver label race on the World Athletics Cross Country Tour.

== Personal life ==
Axford is from Bedford. She was educated at Bedford Girls' School before going on to study geography at the University of Exeter from 2017 to 2020. She is from a sporting family, with her mum playing lacrosse and her father playing rugby. Her siblings Maddie and Charlie also play Hockey.
