= Sarah Madeleine =

French athlete (born 1998)

Personal information
- Born: 20 September 1998 (age 28) Melun, France
- Height: 163 cm (5 ft 4 in)
- Weight: 50 kg (110 lb)

Sport
- Country: France
- Sport: Athletics
- Events: Middle distance running, Long distance running

Achievements and titles
- Personal bests: Outdoor; 1500 m: 3:58.09 (Tokyo, 2025); Mile: 4:29.60 (Stirling, 2023); 3000 m: 9:05.48 (Pontoise, 2023); 5000 m: 14:48.79 (Rome, 2025); Indoor; 1500 m: 4:14.74 (Miramas, 2023); 3000 m: 8:39.13 NR (Liévin, 2026); 5000 m: 14:37.80 NR (Rome, 2026)
Medal record
Women's athletics
Representing France
World Cross Country Championships
Silver medal – second place	2026 Tallahassee	Mixed relay
European Cross Country Championships
Gold medal – first place	2023 Brussels	Mixed relay

Sarah Madeleine (born 20 September 1998) is a French middle- and long-distance runner. In 2026, she set new French indoor national records in the 3000 metres and 5000 metres.

== Biography ==
Madeleine was the bronze medalist in the 1500 meters at the 2022 French Indoor Athletics Championships in Miramas.

=== 2023 ===
Madelaine was the silver medalist in the same event at the 2023 French Indoor Athletics Championships in Aubière.

In November 2023, she finished fifth at the Cross international d'Allonnes, the leading French woman. In December 2023, she won a gold medal in the mixed cross country relay race at the 2023 European Cross Country Championships in Brussels.

=== 2024 ===
In January 2024, she ran and won her first 10 km road race in Nice, France in a time of 31:52.

She set a new personal best time of 8:53.51 running indoors in Lyon, in February 2024.

In June 2024, she finished eighth at the 2024 European Athletics Championships in Rome in the 5000 metres in 15:02.56. She competed in the 5000 metres at the 2024 Summer Olympics in Paris in August 2024.

=== 2025 ===
She was selected for the 2025 European Athletics Indoor Championships in Appeldoorn, where she qualified for the final of the 3000 metres. She ran a 14.48.79 personal best for the 5000 metres at the Diamond League event at the 2025 Golden Gala in Rome on 6 June 2025. She ran a new personal best of 3:59.06 in the 1500 metres at the 2025 Meeting de Paris. In September 2025, she was a finalist over 1500 metres at the 2025 World Championships in Tokyo, Japan, placing eighth overall and running a personal best time of 3:58.09.

=== 2026 ===
Madelaine won the silver medal representing France in the mixed relay at the 2026 World Athletics Cross Country Championships in Tallahassee, Florida on 10 January 2026, alongside Agathe Guillemot and Antoine Senard. On 24 January, Madeleine set a new French indoor national record over 5000 metres in Lyon, running 15:03.76. On 19 February, she set a new French indoor record for the 3000 metres of 8:39.13 in Liévin.

On 4 June, she lowered the French national record for the 5000 metres to 14:37.80 at the 2026 Golden Gala in Rome, part of the 2026 Diamond League. That month, she was injured in a road accident when she was hit by a car while riding her bicycle. Returning to racing in November, Madeleine won the Women's elite race at the Corrida Bulloise in Switzerland on 21 November 21 2026.
