= Sofia Thøgersen =

Danish athlete (born 2005)

Personal information
- Nationality: Denmark
- Born: 6 July 2005 (age 21)

Sport
- Sport: Athletics
- Events: 1500m, 3000m, cross country

Achievements and titles
- Personal bests: 800m: 2:03.23 (Trier, 2023); 1500m: 4:05.34 (Budapest, 2023) NR; 3000m: 8:50.26 (Metz, 2024); 5000m: 15:44.29 (Karlsruhe, 2023); 3000m steeplechase: 10:02.69 (Copenhagen, 2023)
Medal record
Women's athletics
Representing Denmark
European U20 Championships
Silver medal – second place	2021 Tallinn	3000m
Silver medal – second place	2023 Jerusalem	1500m
Bronze medal – third place	2023 Jerusalem	5000m
European Cross Country Championships
Silver medal – second place	2023 Brussels	U20 race
Bronze medal – third place	2024 Antalya	U20 race
European U18 Championships
Gold medal – first place	2022 Jerusalem	3000m
Silver medal – second place	2022 Jerusalem	2000m Steeplechase

Sofia Thøgersen (born 6 July 2005) is a Danish middle distance and long distance runner. A multiple-time national champion, and the Danish national record holder over 1500 metres, in 2023 she became the youngest Danish athlete to compete at the World Athletics Championships.

== Early life ==
Thøgersen joined Sparta Athletics and Running club in Østerbro when she was six years-old.

== Career ==
=== 2021 ===
In 2021, Thøgersen became the senior Danish champion over 1500m, aged 16 years-old. Thøgersen won silver at the 2021 European Athletics U20 Championships in Tallinn, in a 3000m world-leading time by an under-18 year-old athlete in Europe, of 9:16.43. In November 2021, competing as one of the youngest athletes in the race, Thøgersen finished 15th at the 2021 European Cross Country Championships in Dublin.

=== 2022 ===
She won gold at the 2022 European Athletics U18 Championships over 3000m in Jerusalem and also won bronze at the 2000m steeplechase at the same championship. That year, she won two national titles indoors, over 1500 meters and 3000 meters. She also retained her Danish senior champion outdoor title over 1500m in Alborg in June 2022. She secured victory in the women's U20 race at the Nordic Cross Country Championships in Kristiansand in November 2022.

=== 2023 ===
In 2023, she retained her senior 1500m title in June 2023. Selected for the 2023 World Athletics Championships – Women's 1500 metres, she became the youngest Danish competitor in championship history, and had to apply for time-off from her school in order to compete. Although she didn't qualify for the semi final, she ran a new national record time of 4:05.34. Thøgersen also set a new national record time for the 3000m in 2023, running 8.53.39 at the Copenhagen Athletics Games in Østerbro, improving Anna Emilie Møller's 18-year record by 17 seconds.

She defended her U20 women's title at the Nordic Cross Country Championships in Reykjavík in November 2023. Selected for the 2023 European Cross Country Championships in Brussels in December 2023, she won silver in the women's U20 race behind Innes FitzGerald.

=== 2024 ===
In January 2024 in Metz, she broke the European indoor U20 record for the 3000 metres (8:50.26) breaking the previous mark (8:56.36) set by Konstanze Klosterhalfen of Germany, in 2016. Thøgersen's time was also a Danish indoor senior record, and made her the first Danish woman to break the 9:00-minute barrier indoors. She competed in the women's 1500 metres race at the 2024 World Athletics Indoor Championships in Glasgow.

She won the senior women's race at the Danish Cross Country Championships in Odense in November 2024. She won the bronze medal in the U20 race at the 2024 European Cross Country Championships in Antalya, Turkey.

=== 2025 ===
In September 2025, she competed over 1500 metres at the 2025 World Championships in Tokyo, Japan, without advancing to the semi-finals.

On 8 November 2025, she placed sixth in the women's 6.4 km race at the Cardiff Cross Challenge in Wales, a gold race part of the World Athletics Cross Country Tour.

== Personal life ==
Her younger brother William Thøgersen also competes.
