= Elise Thorner =

British athlete (born 2001)

- Thorner in 2026

Personal information
- Born: 16 March 2001 (age 25)

Sport
- Sport: Athletics
- Event: Steeplechase
- Club: Wells City/Yeovil
- Coached by: Helen Clitheroe

Achievements and titles
- Personal bests: 1500m: 4:10.28 (Stretford, 2025); Mile: 4:35.72 (Boston, 2024); 3000m: 8:39.87 (Boston, 2026); 5000m: 16:28.59 (Clovis, 2022); 3000m s'chase: 9:05.45 (Glasgow, 2026)
Medal record
Women's athletics
Representing Great Britain
European Cross Country Championships
Bronze medal – third place	2024 Antalya	Mixed relay
Representing England
Commonwealth Games
Silver medal – second place	2026 Glasgow	3000m steeplechase

Elise Thorner (born 16 March 2001) is a British track and field athlete. She was the British champion in the 3000m steeplechase in 2025 and 2026, and won the silver medal at the 2026 Commonwealth Games.

Competing for Great Britain, Thorner won a bronze medal at the 2024 European Cross Country Championships in the mixed team relay.

== Early life ==
From Bridgwater, she attended school at Millfield in Somerset. She won gold in the girls' 1500m steeplechase at the School Games National Finals at Loughborough in 2017. She attended New Mexico University and transferred to the University of Florida in 2023, where she joined her brother in the Florida Gators Track & Field program.

== Biography ==
In April 2022, she set a new personal best for the 3000m steeplechase, running 9:40:98 in California. On 29 April 2022, she set an English U23 record running 9:32.42 at the Payton Jordan Invitational, hosted by Stanford. In June 2022, she finished third in the 3000m steeplechase at the British Championships in Manchester. She was selected for the a British team for the 2022 European Athletics Championships in Munich. She finished in 14th place in her heat for the 3000 metres steeplechase, in a time of 10:08.46.

In April 2023, she won the Bryan Clay Invitational 3000m steeplechase in California, running 9:39.39. She finished fourth in the final of the 3000m steeplechase at the 2023 European Athletics U23 Championships in Espoo in 9:47.85.

In April 2024, she went to fourth on the all-time British list for the 3000m steeplechase, running 9:28.49 in California. At the same event, she ran 4:14.55 for the 1500 metres. She qualified for the final of the 3000m steeplechase at the NCAA Division 1 Outdoor Championships in Eugene, Oregon. In June 2024, she finished runner-up at the British Athletics Championships in the 3000 metres steeplechase. She won a bronze medal for the British team in the mixed relay at the 2024 European Cross Country Championships in Antalya, Turkey.

In May 2025, she set a new personal best for the 3000 metres steeplechase running 9:17.57 in Los Angeles. On 12 June 2025, she set another new personal best for the 3000 metres steeplechase running 9:15.06 finishing in seventh place in the 2025 Diamond League event at the Oslo Bislett Games. The time moved her to second on the British all-time list. On 2 August, she became the British 3000 metres steeplechase champion and broke the championship record to win the 2025 UK Athletics Championships in Birmingham in 9:22.05. Later that month, she finished fourth in the 3000 metres steeplechase at the 2025 Athletissima in wet conditions in Lausanne.

Thorner was selected as part of the British team for the 2025 World Athletics Championships in Tokyo, Japan, where she ran a personal best 9:14.37 to qualify for the final of the 3000 metres steeplechase, placing eleventh overall.

On 24 January 2026, Thorner ran 3000 metres in an indoor personal best of 8:39.87 at the New Balance Indoor Grand Prix in Boston. Thorner ran a personal best 9:07.39 to win the 3000 metres steeplechase at the LA Track Fest on 23 May 2026, moving to second on the British all-time list behind Elizabeth Bird. On 7 June, Thorner placed second in the 3000 m steeplechase at the Bauhausgalan in Stockholm, part of the 2026 Diamond League. On 20 June at the 2026 UK Athletics Championships, Thorner won the 3000 m steeplechase in 9:16.95, breaking her own championship record.

Thorner won the silver medal representing England at the 2026 Commonwealth Games in Glasgow , running a new personal best time of 9:05.45, overtaking Ugandan former Olympic champion Peruth Chemutai on the final lap. Two weeks later, she finished fifth in a time of 9:18.14 at the 2026 European Championships in Birmingham. Competing in the Diamond League at the 2026 Athletissima in Lausanne, Switzerland on 21 August 2026, she was the leading European finisher in eighth overall in a race including three German runners who finished ahead of her at the European Championships. At the 2026 Diamond League Final in Brussels in September, she placed tenth in the 3000 metres steeplechase.

== Personal life ==
Thorner has a twin brother, Oliver, who also competes in track and field as part of decathlon.
