= Innes FitzGerald =

British athlete (born 2006)

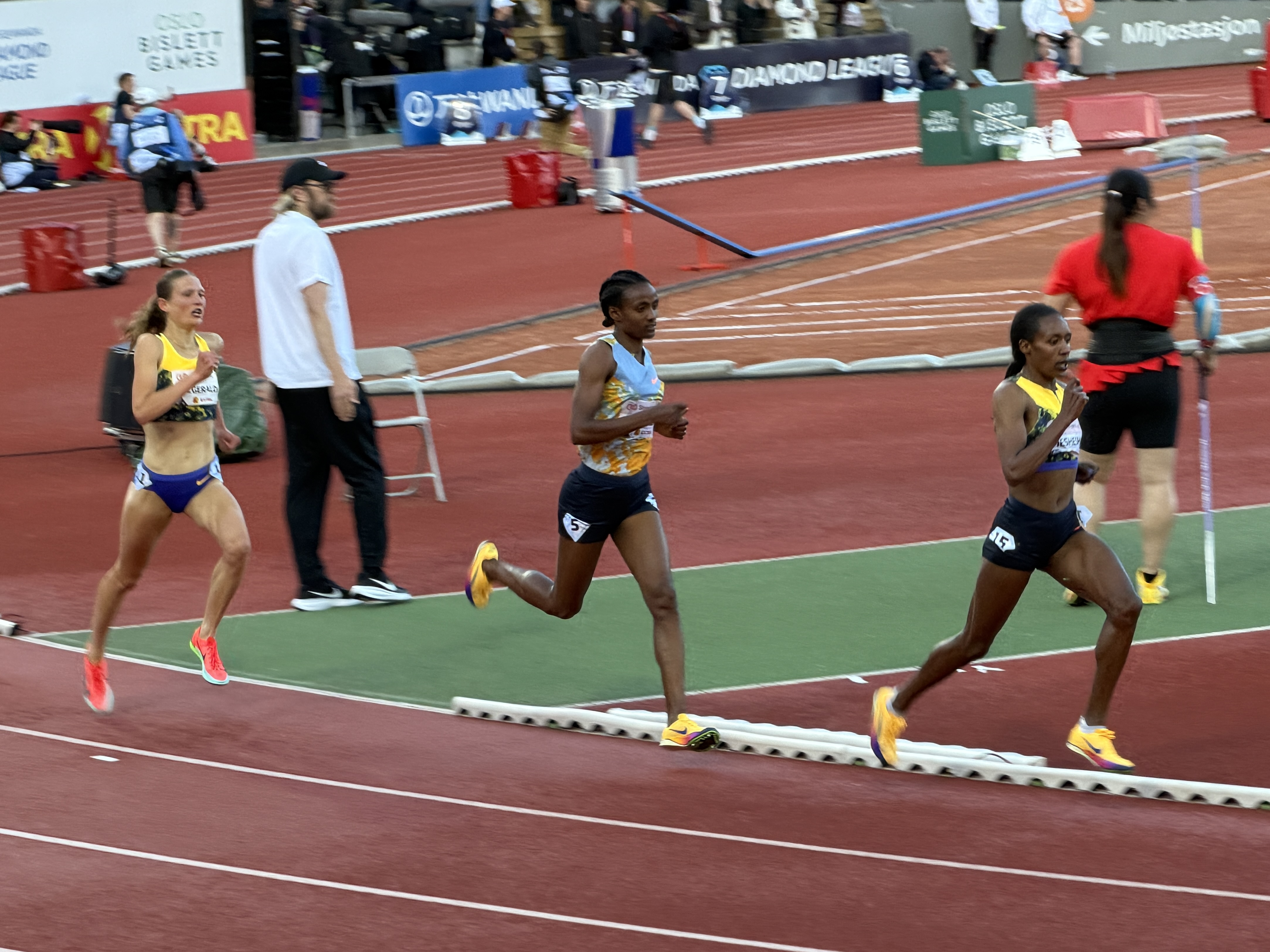
- Innes FitzGerald at the 2026 Bislett Games

Personal information
- Nationality: British
- Born: 6 April 2006 (age 20)

Sport
- Sport: Athletics
- Event: Long-distance
- Club: Exeter AC

Achievements and titles
- Personal bests: 1500m: 4.05.14 (Exeter, 2025); 3000m: 8:32.90 (Stockholm, 2025); 5000m: 14:39.56 (London, 2025) AU20R
Medal record
Women's athletics
Representing Great Britain
European Cross Country Championships
Gold medal – first place	2025 Lagoa	U20 race
Gold medal – first place	2025 Lagoa	U20 team
Gold medal – first place	2024 Antalya	U20 race
Gold medal – first place	2024 Antalya	U20 team
Gold medal – first place	2023 Brussels	U20 race
Gold medal – first place	2023 Brussels	U20 team
European U20 Championships
Gold medal – first place	2025 Tampere	3000 m
Gold medal – first place	2025 Tampere	5000 m

Innes FitzGerald (born 6 April 2006) is a British track and field athlete and cross country runner. She is the 2023, 2024 and 2025 European U20 Cross Country champion both individually and in the team event. In 2025 she won bronze in both the 3000 metres at the British Indoor Athletics Championships and in the 5000 metres at the UK Athletics Championships, before becoming European U20 champion in both the 3000 metres and 5,000 metres.

== Early life ==
FitzGerald hails from Beer, Devon and attended Colyton Grammar School Sixth Form . Her parents own a smallholding on which FitzGerald has worked. In 2024, she began to attend the University of Exeter, where she received a SaSkCo Sports Scholarship, an award created by the late Simon Greenberg to support student athletes at Exeter who have the potential to compete in the Olympic Games.

== Career ==
=== 2022 ===
She runs for the Exeter Harriers and is coached by Gavin Pavey, the husband of runner Jo Pavey. She won the Mini London Marathon in October 2022. FitzGerald set a new under-17 record for 3,000 metres, and in December 2022 finished fourth in the under-20s European Cross Country Championships in Turin, competing as a seventeen year-old. To avoid flying to the competition, FitzGerald had taken a 20-hour coach and train journey from Exeter to Italy.

=== 2023 ===
In January 2023, FitzGerald turned down the opportunity to compete at the 2023 World Athletics Cross Country Championships in Bathurst, Australia because of concerns she holds about contributing to climate change. In a letter to UK Athletics she wrote that “The reality of the travel fills me with deep concern”, adding that "I was just nine when the COP21 Paris Climate agreement was signed. Now, eight years on, and global emissions have been steadily increasing, sending us on a path to climate catastrophe. Turning this around is only possible through transformational change from collective and personal action."

In March 2023, FitzGerald won the English Schools cross country title. She won the senior girls 3000m at the English Schools Championship in July 2023, clocking 9:16.14. In 2023, she also defended her Mini London Marathon title and won the England under-20 3000m title.

She ran a new personal best at the BMC Watford Gold Standard meet on the 12 July 2023 when she clocked 4:15.04 for the 1500m.

In October 2023, Fitzgerald was announced as the winner of the BBC Green Sports Awards 'Young Athlete of the Year' for her refusal to fly to the World Cross Country Championships taking place in Australia. Selected for the 2023 European Cross Country Championships in Brussels in December 2023, she won the women's U20 race and also claimed gold as part of the British squad in the team race. The following week, she finished third behind Laura Muir and Georgia Bell, running the 3000m indoors at the Christmas Classic in Cardiff.

=== 2024 ===
On 20 January 2024, she won the U20 London International Cross Country event. In March 2024, she won the UK U20 Inter-Counties Cross Country Championships at Wollaton Park. However, after the race she said she would not take her automatic place at the 2024 World Athletics Cross Country Championships that month, due to travel time and the impact it would have on her A-Levels study. However, she was named in the British team for the event. She finished as leading European, in 17th place, as Britain finished fifth in the team U20 event.

In May 2024, she was selected to represent England over 3000 metres at the Loughborough International and won the 3000 metres in 9:08.91. She was selected for the 2024 World Athletics U20 Championships in Lima, Peru, where she placed fourth in the final of the 3000 metres in a personal best time of 8:57.01.

In October 2024, she was nominated by Athletics Weekly for best British female junior. In November 2024, she was named by British Athletics on the Olympic Futures Programme for 2025. On 23 November 2024, she won the U20 race at the Liverpool Cross Challenge. She was selected for the British U20 team for the 2024 European Cross Country Championships in Antalya, Turkey, winning gold in the U20 race to become just the fourth woman to win back-to-back titles at the event.

=== 2025 ===
In January 2025, she ran 8:48.30 in Cardiff to better the European under-20 indoor 3000m record, however the time is not officially ratified as it occurred in a mixed race. She broke the European under-20 3000m indoors record in February 2025, running 8:40.05 in Ostrava to beat Sofia Thøgersen's previous best mark by 10 seconds. The time also took 16 seconds off Zola Budd’s 40 year-old British indoor under-20 record. She finished third over 3000 metres at the 2025 British Indoor Athletics Championships. She was selected for the British team for the 2025 European Athletics Indoor Championships in Apeldoorn, where she qualified for the final of the 3000 metres on her senior international debut. In the final, she placed eighth overall.

She ran a 3000 metres personal best of 8:32.90 at the 2025 BAUHAUS-galan event in Stockholm, part of the 2025 Diamond League. She broke Zola Budd's European under-20 5000m record at the 2025 London Athletics Meet, running 14:39.56. On 2 August 2025, she finished third in the 5000m at the 2025 UK Athletics Championships in Birmingham. The following week, she won the gold medal over 5000 metres at the 2025 European Athletics U20 Championships in Tampere. She won in a time of 15:09.04 to finish over 30 seconds ahead of Edibe Yagiz in second. She then completed a distance double at the championships by breaking Gabriela Szabo’s 32-year-old championships record to win the women’s 3000m in 8:46.39.

In September 2025, she competed over 5000 metres at the 2025 World Championships in Tokyo, Japan, without advancing to the final. In September 2025, she was nominated for the European Athletics female rising star award. On 8 November, she won the U20 race at the Cardiff Cross Challenge. Later that month, she won the U20 race at the Liverpool Cross Challenge. On 14 December, she emulated fellow British athlete Steph Twell, winning her third consecutive under-20 title at the 2025 European Cross Country Championships, also winning the gold medal in the team event, in Lagoa, Portugal.

=== 2026 ===
On 1 January, FitzGerald ran the fastest parkrun recorded by a British female, in Exmouth, where her recorded time of 15:27 improved the previous best time by four seconds, set by Melissa Courtney-Bryant in 2022. On 3 February 2026, she lowered her indoor personal best for the 1500 metres to 4:08.73 at the Golden Gala in Ostrava. In June, she placed ninth over 3000 metres at the 2026 Bislett Games. On 20 June, she placed second to Hannah Nuttall in the 5000 metres race at the 2026 UK Athletics Championships.

Fitzgerald was selected to represent England at the 2026 Commonwealth Games in Glasgow, placing eleventh in the 5000 metres in 15:02.80. In October 2026, she was retained on the 2026/27 Olympic Futures Programme awarded by UK Athletics.
