= 2022 European Cross Country Championships =

- Organisers: EAA
- Edition: 28th
- Date: 11 December
- Host city: Venaria Reale, Turin, Italy
- Venue: La Mandria Park
- Events: 7
- Distances: 9,572 m – Men; 7,662 m – Women; 7,662 m – U23 men 5,722 m – U23 women 5,722 m – U20 men 3,812 m – U20 women 5,722 m – Mixed relay
- Participation: 623 athletes from 40 nations
- Official website: EAA; FIDAL

External, official videos
- via YouTube
- Senior Men’s Race
- Senior Women’s Race
- U23 Men’s Race
- U23 Women’s Race
- U20 Men’s Race
- U20 Women’s Race
- Mixed relay

The 2022 European Cross Country Championships was the 28th edition of the cross country running competition for European athletes. It was held on 11 December 2022 in La Mandria Park near Turin, Italy.

Italy became the first country to have staged the European Cross Country Championships on four occasions after previous editions in Ferrara in 1998, San Giorgio su Legnano in 2006 and Chia in 2016. Initially Turin received the right to host the event in 2021. However, due to the coronavirus pandemic and cancellation of the 2020 championship, which was supposed to be staged by Dublin, the organizers of the Turin championship agreed to hold them in Italy in 2022, so that the 2021 event could be hosted by the Irish city.

The looped course featured a steep 300 metre uphill and downhill section and a 50 metre-long indoor section through the carriage pavilion of La Mandria Castle (it:Castello della Mandria), part of the UNESCO World Heritage Site since 1997, on each long lap.

Norwegians Jakob Ingebrigtsen and Karoline Bjerkeli Grøvdal successfully defended their men's and women's senior titles from Fingal-Dublin 2021 respectively. It was Ingebrigtsen's sixth consecutive European cross country title after four victories at under-20 level. Grøvdal earned her ninth individual medal, an unsurpassed record by a female athlete in the meet history; it was her third gold after U20 success in 2009.

Great Britain's Charles Hicks and Italy's Nadia Battocletti successfully defended their men's and women's U23 titles respectively. For Battocletti it was a fourth consecutive continental cross country victory.

Great Britain and Northern Ireland topped the medal table with 10 medals, including five golds.

== Medal summary ==
Event	Gold		Silver		Bronze	
Individual
Senior men	Jakob Ingebrigtsen (NOR)	29:33	Emile Cairess (GBR)	29:42	Isaac Kimeli (BEL)	29:45
Senior women	Karoline Bjerkeli Grøvdal (NOR)	26:25	Konstanze Klosterhalfen (GER)	26:29	Alina Reh (GER)	27:19
U23 men	Charles Hicks (GBR)	23:40	Zak Mahamed (GBR)	23:48	Valentin Bresc (FRA)	23:58
U23 women	Nadia Battocletti (ITA)	19:55	Megan Keith (GBR)	20:08	Alexandra Millard (GBR)	20:27
U20 men	Will Barnicoat (GBR)	17:40	Nick Griggs (IRL)	17:41	Dean Casey (IRL)	17:46
U20 women	María Forero (ESP)	13:04	Ingeborg Østgård (NOR)	13:07	Ilona Mononen (FIN)	13:08
Team
Senior men's team	France (FRA); Bastien Augusto; Yann Schrub; Morhad Amdouni; Valentin Gondouin; Youssef Mekdafou; Donovan Christien	24 pts (6+7+11)	Italy (ITA); Yemaneberhan Crippa; Yohanes Chiappinelli; Osama Zoghlami; Nekagenet Crippa; Pasquale Selvarolo	25 pts (4+8+13)	Spain (ESP); Mohamed Katir; Abdessamad Oukhelfen; Carlos Mayo; Roberto Aláiz; Nassim Hassaous; Sergio Paniagua	36 pts (9+10+17)
Senior women's team	Germany (GER); Konstanze Klosterhalfen; Alina Reh; Hanna Klein; Miriam Dattke; Caterina Granz	9 pts (2+3+4)	Great Britain (GBR); Jessica Warner-Judd; Abbie Donnelly; Poppy Tank; Jessica Gibbon; Cari Hughes; Amy-Eloise Markovc	30 pts (8+9+13)	Ireland (IRL); Eilish Flanagan; Roisin Flanagan; Mary Mulhare; Ann-Marie McGlynn; Aoibhe Richardson; Michelle Finn	50 pts (11+12+27)
U23 men's team	Great Britain (GBR); Charles Hicks; Zak Mahamed; Matthew Stonier; Rory Leonard; Joseph Wigfield; Tomer Tarragano	11 pts (1+2+8)	France (FRA); Valentin Bresc; Étienne Daguinos; Antoine Senard; Luc Le Baron; Pierre Bordeau; Téo Rubens Banini	14 pts (3+4+7)	Ireland (IRL); Efrem Gidey; Keelan Kilrehill; Shay McEvoy; Darragh McElhinney; Jamie Battle; Thomas McStay	29 pts (5+9+15)
U23 women's team	Great Britain (GBR); Megan Keith; Alexandra Millard; Grace Carson; Eloise Walker; Alice Goodall; Yasmin Marghini	10 pts (2+3+5)	Italy (ITA); Nadia Battocletti; Aurora Bado; Giovanna Selva; Anna Arnaudo; Sara Nestola; Ludovica Cavalli	31 pts (1+14+16)	France (FRA); Manon Trapp; Floriane Quesada; Flavie Renouard; Eugénie Lorain; Anaëlle Guillonnet; Léatitia Croissant	38 pts (6+15+17)
U20 men's team	Great Britain (GBR); Will Barnicoat; Sam Mills; Luke Birdseye; Edward Bird; Johnny Livingstone; Jacob Deacon	10 pts (1+4+5)	Ireland (IRL); Nick Griggs; Dean Casey; Sean McGinley; Callum Morgan; Jonas Stafford; Mark Hanrahan	17 pts (2+3+12)	Spain (ESP); Jaime Migallon; Mario Monreal; David Cantero; Aleix Vives; Eric Lore	30 pts (6+8+16)
U20 women's team	Spain (ESP); María Forero; Iraia Mendia; Antía Castro; María Viciosa; Marta Serrano; Ines Docampo	21 pts (1+9+11)	Turkey (TUR); Ayça Fidanoğlu; Edibe Yağız; Pelinsu Şahin; Sıla Ata	25 pts (7+8+10)	Germany (GER); Kira Weis; Lisa Merkel; Sofia Benfares; Carolina Schafer; Johanna Pulte	33 pts (6+13+14)
Relay
Mixed relay	Italy (ITA); Pietro Arese; Federica Del Buono; Yassin Bouih; Gaia Sabbatini	17:23	Spain (ESP); Jesús Gómez; Solange Andreia Pereira; Adrián Ben; Rosalía Tarraga	17:24	France (FRA); Romain Mornet; Charlotte Mouchet; Azeddine Habz; Anaïs Bourgoin	17:31

- Note: Athletes in italics did not score for the team result.

== Medal table ==
* Host nation (Italy)

Rank	Nation	Gold	Silver	Bronze	Total
1	Great Britain (GBR)	5	4	1	10
2	Italy (ITA)*	2	2	0	4
3	Spain (ESP)	2	1	2	5
4	Norway (NOR)	2	1	0	3
5	France (FRA)	1	1	3	5
6	Germany (GER)	1	1	2	4
7	Ireland (IRL)	0	2	3	5
8	Turkey (TUR)	0	1	0	1
9	Belgium (BEL)	0	0	1	1
9	Finland (FIN)	0	0	1	1
Totals (10 entries)		13	13	13	39

== Results ==
=== Senior men ===
Individual race
Rank	Athlete	Country	Time (m:s)
1st place, gold medalist(s)	Jakob Ingebrigtsen	Norway	29:33
2nd place, silver medalist(s)	Emile Cairess	United Kingdom	29:42
3rd place, bronze medalist(s)	Isaac Kimeli	Belgium	29:45
4	Yemaneberhan Crippa	Italy	29:47
5	Filimon Abraham	Germany	29:49
6	Bastien Augusto	France	29:52
7	Yann Schrub	France	29:52
8	Yohanes Chiappinelli	Italy	30:03
9	Mohamed Katir	Spain	30:06
10	Abdessamad Oukhelfen	Spain	30:08
11	Morhad Amdouni	France	30:12
12	Mahamed Mahamed	United Kingdom	30:18
13	Osama Zoghlami	Italy	30:20
14	John Heymans	Belgium	30:21
15	Peter Lynch	Ireland	30:23
16	Davor Aaron Bienenfeld	Germany	30:25
17	Carlos Mayo	Spain	30:27
18	Roberto Aláiz	Spain	30:30
19	Michael Somers	Belgium	30:32
20	Valentin Gondouin	France	30:36
21	Narve Gilje Nordås	Norway	30:40
22	Nekagenet Crippa	Italy	30:40
23	Henrik Ingebrigtsen	Norway	30:44
24	Mike Foppen	Netherlands	30:44
25	Nassim Hassaous	Spain	30:44
26	Samuel Fitwi Sibhatu	Germany	30:46
27	Hiko Tonosa Haso	Ireland	30:48
28	Emil Danielsson	Sweden	30:49
29	Andreas Vojta	Austria	30:49
30	Brian Fay	Ireland	30:50
31	Mikkel Dahl-Jessen	Denmark	30:50
32	Hugo Milner	United Kingdom	30:50
33	Barry Keane	Ireland	30:52
34	Sergio Paniagua	Spain	30:54
35	Robin Hendrix	Belgium	30:58
36	Cormac Dalton	Ireland	31:01
37	Ellis Cross	United Kingdom	31:05
38	Jamal Abdelmaji Eisa Mohammed	ART	31:12
39	Max Peter Bejmer	Sweden	31:12
40	Peter Ďurec	Slovakia	31:13
41	Jáchym Kovář	Czech Republic	31:15
42	Ben Connor	United Kingdom	31:16
43	Youssef Mekdafou	France	31:17
44	Jack Rowe	United Kingdom	31:19
45	Mohammad Reza	Sweden	31:22
46	Pasquale Selvarolo	Italy	31:23
47	Leonid Latsepov	Estonia	31:24
48	Jonas Gertsen	Denmark	31:31
49	Seyd Taha Ghafari	ART	31:34
50	Stan Niesten	Netherlands	31:37
51	Tachlowini Gabriyesos	ART	31:38
52	Ersin Tekal	Turkey	31:46
53	Elzan Bibić	Serbia	31:50
54	Filmon Tesfu	Netherlands	31:51
55	Hlynur Andrésson	Iceland	31:53
56	Jurjen Polderman	Netherlands	31:54
57	Patrick Karl	Germany	31:56
58	Marios Anagnostou	Greece	32:02
59	Donovan Christien	France	32:05
60	Per Svela	Norway	32:15
61	Fouad Idbafdil	ART	32:19
62	Kaur Kivistik	Estonia	32:29
63	Karel Hussar	Estonia	32:32
64	Sezgin Ataç	Turkey	32:32
65	Ștefan Iulius Gavril	Romania	32:42
66	Dmytro Siruk	Ukraine	32:46
67	Pierre Murchan	Ireland	32:52
68	Tesfay Felfele	ART	32:58
69	Luke Micallef	Malta	32:58
70	Jan Kokalj	Slovenia	33:47
71	Bob Bertemes	Luxembourg	34:55
72	Arnold Rogers	Gibraltar	36:05
73	Charel Weicherding	Luxembourg	36:12
74	Lorenzo Bugli	San Marino	36:34
75	Richard Blagg	Gibraltar	37:44
76	Ilir Këllezi	Albania	38:16
77	Sonny Folcheri	Monaco	39:04
78	Robert Matto	Gibraltar	39:50
79	Leon Gordon	Gibraltar	40:03
80	Maurice Turnock	Gibraltar	42:15
—	Filip Ingebrigtsen	Norway	DNF
—	Nahuel Carabaña	Andorra	DNF
—	Sam Parsons	Germany	DNF

Team race
Rank	Team	Points
1st place, gold medalist(s)	France; Bastien Augusto; Yann Schruub; Morhad Amdouni; Valentin Gondouin; Youssef Mekdafou; Donovan Christien	24 pts (6+7+11)
2nd place, silver medalist(s)	Italy; Yemaneberhan Crippa; Yohanes Chiappinelli; Osama Zoghlami; Nekagenet Crippa; Pasquale Selvarolo	25 pts (4+8+13)
3rd place, bronze medalist(s)	Spain; Mohamed Katir; Abdessamad Oukhelfen; Carlos Mayo; Roberto Aláiz; Nassim Hassaous; Sergio Paniagua	36 pts (9+10+17)
4	Belgium; Isaac Kimeli; John Heymans; Michael Somers; Robin Hendrix	36 pts (3+14+19)
5	Norway; Jakob Ingebrigtsen; Narve Gilje Nordås; Henrik Ingebrigtsen; Per Svela; Filip Ingebrigtsen	45 pts (1+21+23)
6	Great Britain; Emile Cairess; Mahamed Mahamed; Hugo Milner; Ellis Cross; Ben Connor; Jack Rowe	46 pts (2+12+32)
7	Germany; Filimon Abraham; Davor Aaron Bienenfeld; Samuel Fitwi Sibhatu; Patrick Karl; Sam Parsons	47 pts (5+16+26)
8	Ireland; Peter Lynch; Hiko Tonosa Haso; Brian Fay; Barry Keane; Cormac Dalton; Pierre Murchan	72 pts (15+27+30)
9	Sweden; Emil Danielsson; Max Peter Bejmer; Mohammad Reza	112 pts (28+39+45)
10	Netherlands; Mike Foppen; Stan Niesten; Filmon Tesfu; Jurjen Polderman	128 pts (24+50+54)
11	Estonia; Leonid Latsepov; Kaur Kivistik; Karel Hussar	172 pts (47+62+63)
12	Gibraltar; Arnold Rogers; Richard Blagg; Robert Matto; Leon Gordon; Maurice Turnock	225 pts (72+75+78)

=== Senior women ===
Individual race
Rank	Athlete	Country	Time (m:s)
1st place, gold medalist(s)	Karoline Bjerkeli Grøvdal	Norway	26:25
2nd place, silver medalist(s)	Konstanze Klosterhalfen	Germany	26:29
3rd place, bronze medalist(s)	Alina Reh	Germany	27:19
4	Hanna Klein	Germany	27:19
5	Selamawit Teferi	Israel	27:20
6	Miriam Dattke	Germany	27:22
7	Samrawit Mengsteab	Sweden	27:27
8	Jessica Warner-Judd	United Kingdom	27:27
9	Abbie Donnelly	United Kingdom	27:28
10	Veerle Bakker	Netherlands	27:34
11	Eilish Flanagan	Ireland	27:38
12	Roisin Flanagan	Ireland	27:38
13	Poppy Tank	United Kingdom	27:44
14	Jessica Gibbon	United Kingdom	27:44
15	Irene Sánchez-Escribano	Spain	27:46
16	Marie Bouchard	France	27:49
17	Águeda Marqués	Spain	27:56
18	Silke Jonkman	Netherlands	27:58
19	Sarah Lahti	Sweden	28:05
20	Caterina Granz	Germany	28:10
21	Nicole Svetlana Reina	Italy	28:11
22	Carl Hughes	United Kingdom	28:16
23	Naima Ait Alibou	Spain	28:16
24	Isabel Barreiro	Spain	28:18
25	Cecile Jarousseau	France	28:19
26	Amy-Eloise Markovc	United Kingdom	28:20
27	Mary Mulhare	Ireland	28:32
28	Carolina Robles	Spain	28:32
29	Claudia Prisecaru	Romania	28:37
30	Alice Mitard	France	28:38
31	Ann-Marie McGlynn	Ireland	28:40
32	Gaia Colli	Italy	28:41
33	Mélanie Allier	France	28:45
34	Hanne Verbruggen	Belgium	28:46
35	Lisa Rooms	Belgium	28:54
36	Johanna Peiponen	Finland	28:55
37	Sabina Jarzabek	Poland	28:55
38	Emine Hatun Mechaal	Turkey	28:55
39	Sarah Madeleine	France	29:02
40	Militsa Mircheva	Bulgaria	29:02
41	Marta García	Spain	29:05
42	Özlem Kaya	Turkey	29:05
43	Carolien Millenaar	Denmark	29:06
44	Nanna Bové	Denmark	29:09
45	Sara Christiansson	Sweden	29:12
46	Aoibhe Richardson	Ireland	29:13
47	Karawan Halabi	Israel	29:18
48	Juliane Hvid	Denmark	29:22
49	Eline Dalemans	Belgium	29:25
50	Federica Zanne	Italy	29:31
51	Anastasia Denisova	Sweden	29:32
52	Hadar Ophir Forer	Israel	29:36
53	Annie Saugstrup	Denmark	29:46
54	Laura Maasik	Estonia	29:48
55	Michelle Finn	Ireland	29:57
56	Lilla Böhm	Sweden	29:59
57	Anja Fink	Slovenia	30:01
58	Maryna Nemchenko	Sweden	30:06
59	Sophie Tonneau	France	30:22
60	Cristina Molteni	Italy	30:46
61	Ismini Panagiotopoulou	Greece	31:10
62	Eirini Tsoupaki	Greece	32:00
63	Maria Gorette Subano	Italy	32:46
—	Yasemin Can	Turkey	DNF
—	Michela Moretton	Italy	DNF
—	Sara Schou Kristensen	Denmark	DNF
—	Evgenia Papadimatou	Greece	DNF
—	Camilla Richardsson	Finland	DNS

Team race
Rank	Team	Points
1st place, gold medalist(s)	Germany; Konstanze Klosterhalfen; Alina Reh; Hanna Klein; Miriam Dattke; Caterina Granz	9 pts (2+3+4)
2nd place, silver medalist(s)	Great Britain; Jessica Warner-Judd; Abbie Donnelly; Poppy Tank; Jessica Gibbon; Cari Hughes; Amy-Eloise Markovc	30 pts (8+9+13)
3rd place, bronze medalist(s)	Ireland; Eilish Flanagan; Roisin Flanagan; Mary Mulhare; Ann-Marie McGlynn; Aoibhe Richardson; Michelle Finn	50 pts (11+12+27)
4	Spain; Irene Sánchez-Escribano; Águeda Marqués; Naima Ait Alibou; Isabel Barreiro; Carolina Robles; Marta García	55 pts (15+17+23)
5	France; Marie Bouchard; Cecile Jarousseau; Alice Mitard; Mélanie Allier; Sarah Madeleine; Sophie Tonneau	71 pts (16+25+30)
6	Sweden; Samrawit Mensteab; Sarah Lahti; Sara Christiansson; Anastasia Denisova	71 pts (7+19+45)
7	Italy; Nicole Svetlana Reina; Gaia Colli; Federica Zanne; Cristina Molteni; Maria Gorette Subano; Michela Moretton	103 pts (21+32+50)
8	Israel; Selamawit Teferi; Karawan Halabi; Hadar Ophir Forer	104 pts (5+47+52)
9	Belgium; Hanne Verbruggen; Lisa Rooms; Eline Dalemans	118 pts (34+35+49)
10	Denmark; Carolien Millenaar; Nanna Bové; Juliane Hvid; Annie Saugstrup; Sara Schou Kristensen	135 pts (43+44+48)

=== Senior mixed relay ===
Rank	Team	Time (m:s)
1st place, gold medalist(s)	Italy; Pietro Arese, Federica Del Buono, Yassin Bouih, Gaia Sabbatini	17:23
2nd place, silver medalist(s)	Spain; Jesús Gómez, Solange Andreia Pereira, Adrián Ben, Rosalía Tarraga	17:24
3rd place, bronze medalist(s)	France; Romain Mornet, Charlotte Mouchet, Azeddine Habz, Anaïs Bourgoin	17:31
4	Germany; Marc Tortell, Elena Burkard, Jens Mergenthaler, Nele Weßel	17:32
5	United Kingdom; James Heneghan, Revée Walcott-Nolan, Callum Elson, Khahisa Mhlanga	17:35
6	Hungary; Gergő Kiss, Zita Urbán, István Szögi, Kinga Ohn	17:44
7	Belgium; Ruben Verheyden, Mariska Parewyck, Stijn Baeten, Vanessa Scaunet	17:47
8	Denmark; Kristian Uldbjerg Hansen, Stina Troest, Andreas Lindgreen, Annemarie Nissen	17:47
9	Ireland; Andrew Coscoran, Georgie Hartigan, Luke McCann, Nadia Power	17:56
10	Portugal; Isaac Nader, Patricia Silva, Nuno Pereira, Salomé Afonso	17:56
11	Romania; Nicolae Marian Felix Coman, Elena Adelina Panaet, Laviniu Madalin Chis, Cristina Daniela Bălan	18:19
12	Finland; Joonas Rinne, Camilla Richardsson, Topi Raitanen, Viola Westling	18:24
13	Croatia; Dino Bošnjak, Tea Faber, Marino Bloudek, Bojana Bjeljac	19:04
14	Andorra; Pol Moya, Aina Cinca Bons, Carles Gómez Lozano, Xènia Mourelo	19:57

=== U23 men ===
Individual race
Rank	Athlete	Country	Time (m:s)
1st place, gold medalist(s)	Charles Hicks	United Kingdom	23:40
2nd place, silver medalist(s)	Zakariya Mahamed	United Kingdom	23:48
3rd place, bronze medalist(s)	Valentin Bresc	France	23:58
4	Etienne Daguinos	France	24:04
5	Efrem Gidey	Ireland	24:05
6	Adisu Guadia	Israel	24:06
7	Antoine Senard	France	24:10
8	Matthew Stonier	United Kingdom	24:11
9	Keelan Kilrehill	Israel	24:13
10	Magnus Tuv Myhre	Norway	24:14
11	Rory Leonard	United Kingdom	24:15
12	Derebe Ayele	Israel	24:18
13	Joseph Wigfield	United Kingdom	24:19
14	Marco Fontana Granotto	Italy	24:22
15	Shay McEvoy	Ireland	24:22
16	Miguel Moreira	Portugal	24:33
17	Luc Le Baron	France	24:43
18	Adam Maijo	Spain	24:44
19	Andrii Atamaniuk	Ukraine	24:45
20	Tim Verbaandert	Netherlands	24:45
21	Job Ijtsma	Netherlands	24:45
22	Ramazan Baştuğ	Turkey	24:47
23	Yorick van de Kerkhove	Belgium	24:48
24	Eemil Helander	Finland	24:49
25	Luca Alfieri	Italy	24:50
26	Darragh McElhinney	Ireland	24:51
27	Pierre Bordeau	France	24:52
28	Arnaud Collard	France	24:54
29	Rayan Vanderpoorten	Belgium	24:54
30	Enrico Vecchi	Italy	24:56
31	Aarón Las Heras	Spain	24:59
32	Marco Vanderpoorten	Belgium	24:59
33	Pol Oriach	Spain	25:00
34	Jonathan Carmin	Israel	25:01
35	Mikołaj Czeronek	Poland	25:01
36	Miguel Ángel Martínez	Spain	25:02
37	Tomer Tarragano	United Kingdom	25:04
38	Francesco Guerra	Italy	25:05
39	Adria Ceballos	Spain	25:07
40	Vid Botolin	Slovenia	25:07
41	Tim Aßmann	Germany	25:08
42	Téo Rubens Banini	France	25:09
43	Jesse Fokkenrood	Netherlands	25:10
44	Rúben Amaral	Portugal	25:11
45	Marcel Tobler	Austria	25:12
46	Giedrius Valinčius	Lithuania	25:17
47	Etson Barros	Portugal	25:24
48	Miguel Baidal	Spain	25:25
49	Zemenu Muchie	Israel	25:27
50	Mika Kotiranta	Finland	25:34
51	Paul Specht	Germany	25:34
52	Assaf Harari	Israel	25:34
53	Dereje Chekole	Israel	25:35
54	Pedro Amaro	Portugal	25:37
55	Jamie Battle	Spain	25:37
56	Markus Kirk Kjeldsen	Denmark	25:46
57	Léo Lädermann	Switzerland	25:46
58	Sebastian Frey	Austria	25:48
59	Mateusz Gos	Poland	25:50
60	Riccardo Martellato	Italy	25:54
61	Alain Cavagna	Italy	25:54
62	Andreas Bock Bjørnsen	Denmark	26:02
63	Thomas McStay	Ireland	26:06
64	Florian Bremm	Germany	26:08
65	Julian Großkopf	Germany	26:08
66	Nikolaos Stamoulis	Greece	26:11
67	Michal Staník	Slovakia	26:12
68	Aleksander Wiącek	Poland	26:20
69	Kalev Hõlpus	Estonia	26:20
70	Panagiotis Petroulakis	Greece	26:39
71	Benedikt Brem	Germany	26:43
72	Vasyl Sabunyak	Ukraine	26:44
73	Gil Weicherding	Luxembourg	26:47
74	Andriy Krakovetskyy	Ukraine	26:54
75	Jonathan Hedemann Makwarth	Denmark	27:02
76	Athanasios Ligonis	Greece	27:10
77	Leonid Vandevski	North Macedonia	27:26
78	David Borg	Malta	28:32
	Jeppe Risvig	Denmark	DNF
	Stan Schipperen	Netherlands	DNF
	Illya Kunin	Ukraine	DNF
	Mustafe Muuse	Finland	DNF
	Samuel Pihlström	Sweden	DNS

Team race
Rank	Team	Points
1st place, gold medalist(s)	United Kingdom; Charles Hicks; Zakariya Mahamed; Matthew Stonier; Rory Leonard; Joseph Wigfield; Tomer Tarragano	11 pts (1+2+8)
2nd place, silver medalist(s)	France; Valentin Bresc; Etienne Daguinos; Antoine Senard; Luc Le Baron; Pierre Bordeau; Téo Rubens Banini	14 pts (3+4+7)
3rd place, bronze medalist(s)	Ireland; Efrem Gidey; Keelan Kilrehill; Shay McEvoy; Darragh McElhinney; Jamie Battle; Thomas McStay	29 pts (5+9+15)
4	Israel; Adisu Guadia; Derebe Ayele; Jonathan Carmin; Zemenu Muchie; Assaf Harari; Dereje Chekole	52 pts (6+12+34)
5	Italy; Marco Fontana Granotto; Luca Alfieri; Enrico Vecchi; Francesco Guerra; Riccardo Martellato; Alain Cavagna	69 pts (14+25+30)
6	Belgium; Yorick van de Kerkhove; Arnaud Collard; Rayan Vanderpoorten; Marco Vanderpoorten	80 pts (23+28+29)
7	Spain; Adam Maijo; Aarón Las Heras; Pol Oriach; Miguel Ángel Martínez; Adria Ceballos; Miguel Baidal	82 pts (18+31+33)
8	Netherlands; Tim Verbaandert; Job Ijtsma; Jesse Fokkenrood; Stan Schipperen	84 pts (20+21+43)
9	Portugal; Miguel Moreira; Rúben Amaral; Etson Barros; Pedro Amaro	107 pts (16+44+47)
10	Germany; Tim Aßmann; Paul Specht; Florian Bremm; Julian Großkopf; Benedikt Brem	156 pts (41+51+64)
11	Poland; Mikołaj Czeronek; Mateusz Gos; Aleksander Wiącek	162 pts (35+59+68)
12	Ukraine; Andrii Atamaniuk; Vasyl Sabunyak; Andriy Krakovetskyy; Illya Kunin	165 pts (19+72+74)
13	Denmark; Markus Kirk Kjeldsen; Andreas Bock Bjørnsen; Jonathan Hedemann Makwarth; Jeppe Risvig	193 pts (56+62+75)
14	Greece; Nikolaos Stamoulis; Panagiotis Petroulakis; Athanasios Ligonis	212 pts (66+70+76)
	Finland; Eemil Helander; Mika Kotiranta; Mustafe Muuse	NM

=== U23 Women ===
Individual race
Rank	Athlete	Country	Time (m:s)
1st place, gold medalist(s)	Nadia Battocletti	Italy	19:55
2nd place, silver medalist(s)	Megan Keith	United Kingdom	20:08
3rd place, bronze medalist(s)	Alexandra Millard	United Kingdom	20:27
4	Amina Maatoug	Netherlands	20:33
5	Grace Carson	United Kingdom	20:35
6	Manon Trapp	France	20:42
7	Carmen Riaño	Spain	20:43
8	Nathalie Blomqvist	Finland	20:53
9	Mariana Machado	Portugal	20:56
10	Andrea Romero	Spain	20:58
11	Eloise Walker	United Kingdom	20:59
12	Andrea Modin Engesæth	Norway	21:00
13	Alice Goodall	United Kingdom	21:02
14	Aurora Bado	Italy	21:06
15	Floriane Quesada	France	21:08
16	Giovanna Selva	Italy	21:09
17	Flavie Renouard	France	21:13
18	Yasmin Marghini	United Kingdom	21:15
19	Anna Arnaudo	Italy	21:15
20	Sara Nestola	Italy	21:21
21	Emilia Lillemo	Sweden	21:23
22	Greta Karinauskaitė	Lithuania	21:24
23	Lia Lemos	Portugal	21:31
24	Alina Sönning	Switzerland	21:31
25	Emma Heckel	Germany	21:31
26	Mia Jurenka	Germany	21:33
27	Anneke Vortmeier	Germany	21:36
28	Danielle Donegan	Ireland	21:36
29	Sibylle Häring	Switzerland	21:39
30	Ludovica Cavalli	Italy	21:40
31	María González	Spain	21:44
32	Angela Viciosa	Spain	21:46
33	Dafni-Eftychia-Tereza Lavasa	Greece	21:48
34	Eugénie Lorain	France	21:48
35	Niamh O'Mahony	Ireland	21:52
36	Anaëlle Guillonnet	France	22:05
37	Karolína Sasynová	Czech Republic	22:08
38	Devora Avramova	Bulgaria	22:10
39	Laura Mooney	Ireland	22:11
40	Annelies Nijssen	Belgium	22:12
41	Jana Van Lent	Belgium	22:19
42	Laura Rodriguez	Spain	22:21
43	Annasophie Drees	Germany	22:22
44	Juliette Thomas	Belgium	22:23
45	Ivanna Potapchuk	Ukraine	22:30
46	Wilma Nielsen	Sweden	22:31
47	Léatitia Croissant	France	22:36
48	Roxane Cleppe	Belgium	22:39
49	Alicia Berzosa	Spain	22:41
50	Agnès Mc Tighe	Switzerland	22:48
51	Sabriye Güzelyurt	Turkey	22:51
52	Julia Koralewska	Poland	22:55
53	Rahel Brömmel	Germany	22:57
54	Jodie McCann	Ireland	22:59
55	Inês Borba	Portugal	23:05
56	Liza Šajn	Slovenia	23:18
57	Kateryna Onisimova	Ukraine	25:19
	Sarah Healy	Ireland	DNF
	Aoife O'Cuill	Ireland	DNF

Team race
Rank	Team	Points
1st place, gold medalist(s)	United Kingdom; Megan Keith; Alexandra Millard; Grace Carson; Eloise Walker; Alice Goodall; Yasmin Marghini	10 pts (2+3+5)
2nd place, silver medalist(s)	Italy; Nadia Battocletti; Aurora Bado; Giovanna Selva; Anna Arnaudo; Sara Nestola; Ludovica Cavalli	31 pts (1+14+16)
3rd place, bronze medalist(s)	France; Manon Trapp; Floriane Quesada; Flavie Renouard; Eugénie Lorain; Anaëlle Guillonnet; Léatitia Croissant	38 pts (6+15+17)
4	Spain; Carmen Riaño; Andrea Romero; María González; Angela Viciosa; Laura Rodriguez; Alicia Berzosa	48 pts (7+10+31)
5	Germany; Emma Heckel; Mia Jurenka; Anneke Vortmeier; Annasophie Drees; Rahel Brömmel	78 pts (25+26+27)
6	Portugal; Mariana Machado; Lia Lemos; Inês Borba	87 pts (9+23+55)
7	Ireland; Danielle Donegan; Niamh O'Mahony; Laura Mooney; Jodie McCann; Sarah Healy; Aoife O'Cuill	102 pts (28+35+39)
8	Switzerland; Alina Sönning; Sibylle Häring; Agnès Mc Tighe	103 pts (24+29+50)
9	Belgium; Annelies Nijssen; Jana Van Lent; Juliette Thomas; Roxane Cleppe	125 pts (40+41+44)

=== U20 Men ===
Individual race
Rank	Athlete	Country	Time (m:s)
1st place, gold medalist(s)	Will Barnicoat	United Kingdom	17:40
2nd place, silver medalist(s)	Nicholas Griggs	Ireland	17:41
3rd place, bronze medalist(s)	Dean Casey	Ireland	17:46
4	Sam Mills	United Kingdom	17:54
5	Luke Birdseye	United Kingdom	17:56
6	Jaime Migallón	Spain	18:06
7	Esten Hansen-Møllerud Hauen	Norway	18:07
8	Mario Monreal	Spain	18:09
9	Edward Bird	United Kingdom	18:09
10	İsmail Taşyürek	Turkey	18:10
11	Taner Tunçtan	Turkey	18:13
12	Sean Mc Ginley	Ireland	18:14
13	Joel Ibler Lillesø	Denmark	18:14
14	Ferenc Soma Kovács	Hungary	18:15
15	Stefan Nillessen	Netherlands	18:15
16	David Cantero	Spain	18:19
17	Noah Konteh	Belgium	18:21
18	Pierre Boudy	France	18:21
19	Callum Morgan	Ireland	18:21
20	Aleix Vives	Spain	18:21
21	Jonathan Hofer	Switzerland	18:22
22	Johnny Livingstone	United Kingdom	18:24
23	Maciej Megier	Poland	18:25
24	Gabriel Timba	France	18:25
25	Vivien Henz	Luxembourg	18:26
26	Benjamin Dern	Germany	18:26
27	Simen Gløgård Stensrud	Norway	18:27
28	Jacob Deacon	United Kingdom	18:27
29	Kurt Lauer	Germany	18:28
30	Vebjørn Hovdejord	Norway	18:29
31	Mathis Lievens	Belgium	18:31
32	Utku Göler	Turkey	18:31
33	Jonas Stafford	Ireland	18:32
34	Kevin Kamenschak	Austria	18:33
35	Eric Loré	Spain	18:34
36	Baptiste Cartieaux	France	18:34
37	Konjoneh Maggi	Italy	18:40
38	Karl Ottfalk	Sweden	18:41
39	Elia Mattio	Italy	18:44
40	Ateka Demisie	Israel	18:45
41	Lukas Ehrle	Germany	18:45
42	Nicolò Cornali	Italy	18:45
43	Valentin Poulin	France	18:45
44	Romuald Brosset	Switzerland	18:47
45	Teun Ter Haar	Netherlands	18:47
46	Kamil Herzyk	Poland	18:47
47	Adrien Le Richomme	France	18:48
48	Federico Sammartino	Italy	18:49
49	Juan Zijderlaan	Netherlands	18:50
50	Simon Jeukenne	Belgium	18:50
51	Rodrigo Lima	Portugal	18:51
52	Suleyman Yalaoui	France	18:57
53	Mark Hanrahan	Ireland	18:57
54	Emil Bezecny	Austria	18:58
55	Jonas Schaub	Switzerland	18:58
56	Dmytro Torhachov	Ukraine	19:00
57	Malthe Juel Bøgebjerg	Denmark	19:01
58	Francesco Ropelato	Italy	19:01
59	Ruben Pires	Portugal	19:04
60	Victor Tvistholm Jørgensen	Denmark	19:05
61	Morten Siht	Estonia	19:05
62	Konrad Pogorzelski	Poland	19:05
63	Enbiya Yazıcı	Turkey	19:08
64	Aarno Liebl	Switzerland	19:09
65	Silas Zahlten	Germany	19:10
66	Timo Hinterndorfer	Austria	19:10
67	Andreas Fjeld Halvorsen	Norway	19:12
68	Odysseas-Antonios Kikas	Greece	19:13
69	Pavel Vinduška	Czech Republic	19:16
70	Matěj Hřebačka	Czech Republic	19:16
71	Matteo Bardea	Italy	19:16
72	Athanasios-Marios Zygouris	Greece	19:17
73	Constantin Carls	Germany	19:18
74	Duarte Santos	Portugal	19:23
75	Thomas Windischbauer	Austria	19:26
76	Vince Desalegn Van Winckel	Belgium	19:36
77	Tomer Mualem	Israel	19:36
78	Dragoș Luca Pop	Romania	19:39
79	Rodrigo Freitas	Portugal	19:43
80	David Šlapák	Czech Republic	19:45
81	Gaspar Klückers	Luxembourg	19:46
82	Marián Dražan	Czech Republic	19:51
83	Nino Jambrešić	Croatia	19:54
84	Gabriel Farrugia	Malta	19:54
85	Maximilian Matolín	Czech Republic	20:03
86	Harel Shain	Israel	20:05
87	Leandro Monteiro	Portugal	20:13
88	Aleksej Klemenčič	Slovenia	20:16
89	Valentas Mockus	Lithuania	20:42
90	Yuval Danieli	Israel	20:42
91	Noa Tončinić	Croatia	20:55
92	Oliver Annus	Estonia	20:55
93	Maurice Gierens	Luxembourg	20:55
94	Ignas Vanagas	Lithuania	20:58
95	Marian Bakšić	Croatia	21:15
96	Erik Černiavski	Lithuania	21:41
	Abdullahi Dahir Rabi	Norway	DNF
	Petros Papaioannou	Greece	DNF
	Keanu Simasotchi	Switzerland	DNF
	Ronaldo Olivo	Spain	DNF
	Axel Vang Christensen	Denmark	DNF

Team race
Rank	Team	Points
1st place, gold medalist(s)	United Kingdom; Will Barnicoat; Sam Mills; Luke Birdseye; Edward Bird; Johnny Livingstone; Jacob Deacon	10 pts (1+4+5)
2nd place, silver medalist(s)	Ireland; Nick Griggs; Dean Casey; Sean McGinley; Callum Morgan; Jonas Stafford; Mark Hanrahan	17 pts (2+3+12)
3rd place, bronze medalist(s)	Spain; Jaime Migallon; Mario Monreal; David Cantero; Aleix Vives; Eric Lore; Ronaldo Olivo	30 pts (6+8+16)
4	Turkey; İsmail Taşyürek; Taner Tunçtan; Utku Göler; Enbiya Yazıcı	53 pts (10+11+32)
5	Norway; Esten Hansen-Møllerud Hauen; Simen Gløgård Stensrud; Vebjørn Hovdejord; Andreas Fjeld Halvorsen; Abdullahi Dahir Rabi	64 pts (7+27+30)
6	France; Pierre Boudy; Gabriel Timba; Baptiste Cartieaux; Valentin Poulin; Adrien Le Richomme; Suleyman Yalaoui	78 pts (18+24+36)
7	Germany; Benjamin Dern; Kurt Lauer; Lukas Ehrle; Silas Zahlten; Constantin Carls	96 pts (26+29+41)
8	Belgium; Noah Konteh; Mathis Lievens; Simon Jeukenne; Vince Desalegn Van Winckel	98 pts (17+31+50)
9	Netherlands; Stefan Nillessen; Teun Ter Haar; Juan Zijderlaan	109 pts (15+45+49)
10	Italy; Konjoneh Maggi; Elia Mattio; Nicolò Cornali; Federico Sammartino; Francesco Ropelato; Matteo Bardea	118 pts (37+39+42)
11	Switzerland; Jonathan Hofer; Romuald Brosset; Jonas Schaub; Aarno Liebl; Keanu Simasotchi	120 pts (21+44+55)
12	Denmark; Joel Ibler Lillesø; Malthe Juel Bøgebjerg; Victor Tvistholm Jørgensen; Axel Vang Christensen	130 pts (13+57+60)
13	Poland; Maciej Megier; Kamil Herzyk; Konrad Pogorzelski	131 pts (23+46+62)
14	Austria; Kevin Kamenschak; Emil Bezecny; Timo Hinterndorfer; Thomas Windischbauer	154 pts (34+54+66)
15	Portugal; Rodrigo Lima; Ruben Pires; Duarte Santos; Rodrigo Freitas; Leandro Monteiro	184 pts (51+59+74)
16	Luxembourg; Vivien Henz; Gaspar Klückers; Maurice Gierens	199 pts (25+81+93)
17	Israel; Ateka Demisie; Tomer Mualem; Harel Shain; Yuval Danieli	203 pts (40+77+86)
18	Czech Republic; Pavel Vinduška; Matěj Hřebačka; David Šlapák; Marián Dražan; Maximilian Matolín	219 pts (69+70+80)
19	Croatia; Nino Jambrešić; Noa Tončinić; Marian Bakšić	269 pts (83+91+95)
20	Lithuania; Valentas Mockus; Ignas Vanagas; Erik Černiavski	279 pts (89+94+96)
	Greece; Odysseas-Antonios Kikas; Athanasios-Marios Zygouris; Petros Papaioannou	NM (68+72)

=== U20 Women ===
Individual race
Rank	Athlete	Country	Time (m:s)
1st place, gold medalist(s)	María Forero	Spain	13:04
2nd place, silver medalist(s)	Ingeborg Østgård	Norway	13:07
3rd place, bronze medalist(s)	Ilona Mononen	Finland	13:08
4	Innes FitzGerald	United Kingdom	13:15
5	Jane Buckley	Ireland	13:22
6	Kira Weis	Germany	13:32
7	Ayça Fidanoğlu	Turkey	13:37
8	Edibe Yağız	Turkey	13:38
9	Iraia Mendia	Spain	13:38
10	Pelinsu Şahin	Turkey	13:43
11	Antía Castro	Spain	13:44
12	Jade Le Corre	France	13:46
13	Lisa Merkel	Germany	13:46
14	Sofia Benfares	Germany	13:48
15	Maren Halle Haugen	Norway	13:48
16	Marie-Louise Jørgensen	Denmark	13:49
17	Katarzyna Napiórkowska	Poland	13:50
18	Rebecca Flaherty	United Kingdom	13:50
19	Margot Dajoux	France	13:51
20	Saima Murić	Serbia	13:51
21	Uliana Rachynska	Ukraine	13:51
22	Julie Voet	Belgium	13:51
23	Megan Harris	United Kingdom	13:52
24	María Viciosa	Spain	13:55
25	Sofia Thøgersen	Denmark	13:57
26	Marie Bilo	Belgium	14:00
27	Carolina Schäfer	Germany	14:00
28	Tetiana Kohut	Ukraine	14:00
29	Veronika Sadek	Slovenia	14:02
30	Lilly Nägeli	Switzerland	14:02
31	Alice Wright	United Kingdom	14:02
32	Lucia Arnoldo	Italy	14:02
33	Johanna Pulte	Germany	14:04
34	Hannah Enkels	Belgium	14:04
35	Fiona Hawkins	Ireland	14:05
36	Anna Marie Nordengen Sirevåg	Norway	14:07
37	Sila Ata	Turkey	14:08
38	Ana Marinho	Portugal	14:08
39	Mădălina-Elena Sîrbu	Romania	14:08
40	Elsa Sundqvist	Sweden	14:09
41	Gréta Varga	Hungary	14:11
42	Fleur Templier	France	14:12
43	Marta Serrano	Spain	14:14
44	Alexandra Maria Hudea	Romania	14:15
45	Adele Roatta	Italy	14:17
46	Beatrice Casagrande	Italy	14:17
47	Lara Costa	Portugal	14:17
48	Shirin Kerber	Switzerland	14:18
49	Ina Halle Haugen	Norway	14:20
50	Maria Mihaela Blaga	Romania	14:22
51	Maria-Talida Sfarghiu	Romania	14:24
52	Anika Thompson	Ireland	14:27
53	Ines Docampo	Spain	14:28
54	Thaïs Paris	France	14:28
55	Rita Figueiredo	Portugal	14:28
56	Tabea Blatter	Switzerland	14:29
57	Maria Kassou	Greece	14:30
58	Iulia Florina Marginean	Romania	14:31
59	Anna Gardiner	Ireland	14:31
60	Alice Bates	United Kingdom	14:31
61	Tetiana Chornovol	Ukraine	14:32
62	Faustine Chaboche	France	14:35
63	Hilla Azran	Israel	14:35
64	Eliška Hostková	Czech Republic	14:37
65	Dione Schipper	Netherlands	14:39
66	Roise Roberts	Ireland	14:40
67	Sofia Sidenius	Italy	14:41
68	Vasiliki Kallimogianni	Greece	14:50
69	Laura Ribigini	Italy	14:53
70	Charlotte Penneman	Belgium	14:53
71	Nicole Coppa	Italy	14:56
72	Hannah Kehoe	Ireland	14:58
73	Diana Fernandes	Portugal	14:59
74	Emma Kiplagat Kondrup	Denmark	15:06
75	Danika Slits	Switzerland	15:08
76	Emily Heilig	Switzerland	15:08
77	Tamar Kuint	Israel	15:13
78	Mejra Mehmedović	Serbia	15:15
79	Beatriz Fernandes	Portugal	15:16
80	Karolina Bliujūte	Lithuania	15:18
81	Natalija Grujić	Serbia	15:39
82	Lorena Bartaković	Croatia	15:48
83	Eleonora Višnevskytė	Lithuania	15:56
84	Sanja Marić	Serbia	16:17
	Beatrice Wood	United Kingdom	DNS
	Astrid My Rønde Kristensen	Denmark	DNF
	Klara Hansen	Denmark	DNF
	Jade Buridon	France	DNF

Team race
Rank	Team	Points
1st place, gold medalist(s)	Spain; María Forero; Iraia Mendia; Antía Castro; María Viciosa; Marta Serrano; Ines Docampo	21 pts (1+9+11)
2nd place, silver medalist(s)	Turkey; Ayça Fidanoğlu; Edibe Yağız; Pelinsu Şahin; Sıla Ata	25 pts (7+8+10)
3rd place, bronze medalist(s)	Germany; Kira Weis; Lisa Merkel; Sofia Benfares; Carolina Schafer; Johanna Pulte	33 pts (6+13+14)
4	United Kingdom; Innes FitzGerald; Rebecca Flaherty; Megan Harris; Alice Wright; Alice Bates; Beatrice Wood	45 pts (4+18+23)
5	Norway; Ingeborg Østgård; Maren Halle Haugen; Anna Marie Nordengen Sirevåg; Ina Halle Haugen	53 pts (2+15+36)
6	France; Jade Le Corre; Margot Dajoux; Fleur Templier; Thaïs Paris; Faustine Chaboche; Jade Buridon	73 pts (12+19+42)
7	Belgium; Julie Voet; Marie Bilo; Hannah Enkels; Charlotte Penneman	82 pts (22+26+34)
8	Ireland; Jane Buckley; Fiona Hawkins; Anika Thompson; Anna Gardiner; Roise Roberts; Hannah Kehoe	92 pts (5+35+52)
9	Ukraine; Uliana Rachynska; Tetiana Kohut; Tetiana Chornovol	110 pts (21+28+61)
10	Denmark; Marie-Louise Jørgensen; Sofia Thøgersen; Emma Kiplagat Kondrup; Astrid My Rønde Kristensen; Klara Hansen	115 pts (16+25+74)
11	Italy; Lucia Arnoldo; Adele Roatta; Beatrice Casagrande; Sofia Sidenius; Laura Ribigini; Nicole Coppa	123 pts (32+45+46)
12	Romania; Mădălina-Elena Sîrbu; Alexandra Maria Hudea; Maria Mihaela Blaga; Maria-Talida Sfarghiu; Iulia Florina Marginean	133 pts (39+44+50)
13	Switzerland; Lilly Nägeli; Shirin Kerber; Tabea Blatter; Danika Slits; Emily Heilig	134 pts (30+48+56)
14	Portugal; Ana Marinho; Lara Costa; Rita Figueiredo; Diana Fernandes; Beatriz Fernandes	140 pts (38+47+55)
15	Serbia; Saima Murić; Mejra Mehmedović; Natalija Grujić; Sanja Marić	179 pts (20+78+81)
