= Charles Hicks (runner) =

British long-distance runner (born 2001)

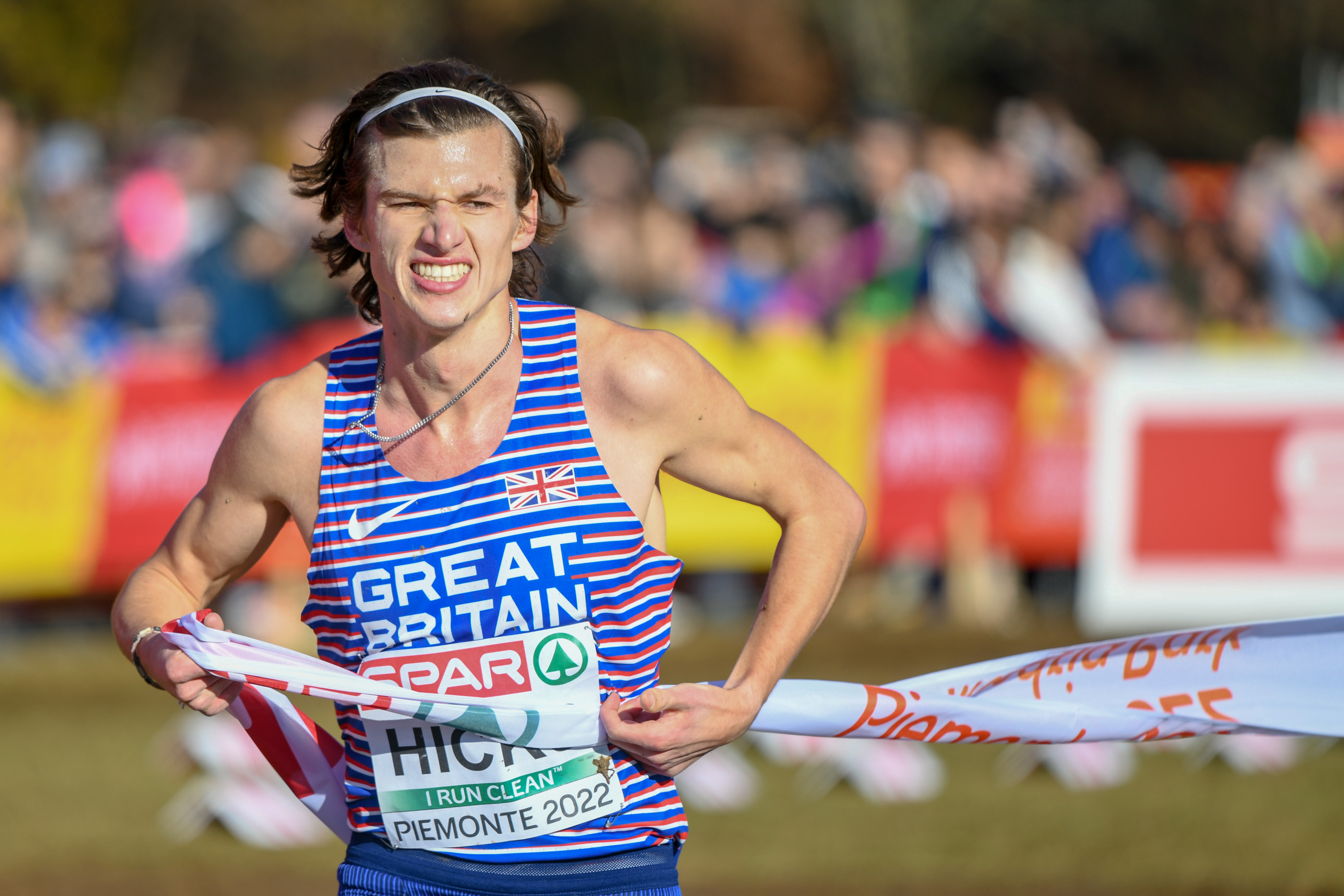
- Hicks at the 2022 European Cross Country Championships in Turin

Personal information
- Nationality: British/American
- Born: 25 July 2001 (age 25) London, England
- Home town: Jacksonville, Florida, U.S.
- Education: Stanford University

Sport
- Sport: Athletics
- Events: Middle-, long-distance running
- College team: Stanford Cardinal
- Club: Shaftesbury Barnet Harriers; Bowerman Track Club
- Coached by: Ricardo Santos; 2019-23; Jerry Schumacher; 2023-Present

Achievements and titles
- Personal bests: 5,000 m: 13:09.38 i (Boston, 2024); Marathon: 2:04:35 (Boston, 2026)
Medal record
Men's athletics
Representing Great Britain
European U23 Championships
Gold medal – first place	2023 Espoo	5000 m
European Cross Country Championships
Gold medal – first place	2019 Lisbon	U20 team
Gold medal – first place	2021 Dublin	U23 race
Gold medal – first place	2022 Turin	U23 race
Gold medal – first place	2022 Turin	U23 team
Silver medal – second place	2021 Dublin	U23 team

Charles Hicks (born 25 July 2001) is a British-American middle- and long-distance runner. He is a two-time European Cross Country under-23 champion (2021, 2022), the first British repeat Euro U23 winner. He placed seventh in the 2026 Boston Marathon, and eighth in the 2026 Chicago Marathon.

Hicks won the 2022 NCAA Division I Cross Country title. In 2025 he transferred allegiance to the United States, where he had lived since the age of 12.

== Career ==
Born and raised in London, Charles Hicks moved with his family to Florida at age 12. He studied cognitive science at Stanford University.

In 2021, he won the men's under-23 title at the European Cross Country Championships in Dublin.

In April 2022, Hicks set a British U23 10,000 metres record with a time of 27:40.16. On 19 November, the 21-year-old won the men's race at the NCAA Division I Cross Country Championships held in Stillwater, Oklahoma, becoming the first Stanford runner, the fourth British runner and the first British runner for over 30 years to win the NCAA XC individual title. He set a course record of 28:43.6 on a hilly 10-kilometer circuit. The following month, Hicks successfully defended his European Cross Country U23 title with a commanding 8-second victory in Turin, Italy.

On June 30, 2023, Hicks signed a professional contract with Nike to run for the Bowerman Track Club and be coached by Jerry Schumacher.

On November 2, 2025, Charles Hicks made his marathon debut at the 2025 New York City Marathon, where he placed 6th in the men's race with a time of 2:09:59.

Hicks finished 7th at the 2026 2026 Boston Marathon, with a time of 2:04:35. In September 2026, Hicks won the USA 20K Championship in New Haven, Connecticut.

In October 2026, Charles Hicks took 8th at the Chicago Marathon with a time of 2:05:35. He was the second American finisher behind Clayton Young.

== Statistics ==
=== Personal bests ===
Times taken from World Athletics.

- 1500 metres – 3:43.59 (Berkeley, CA 2021)
- 3000 metres – 7:43.84 (Seattle, WA 2022)
  - 3000 metres indoor – 7:53.90 (Fayetteville, AR 2023)
- 5000 metres – 13:24.58 (Stanford, CA 2022)
  - 5000 metres indoor – 13:09.38 (Boston, MA 2024)
- 10,000 metres – 27:40.16 (Stanford, CA 2022)
- 10 miles road – 45:14 (Washington, D.C. 2025)
- Marathon - 2:04:35 (Boston, MA 2026)

=== International competitions ===
Representing Great Britain
Year	Competition	Venue	Position	Event	Time
2019	European Cross Country Championships	Lisbon, Portugal	5th	XC 6.3 km U20	19:05
2019	European Cross Country Championships	Lisbon, Portugal	1st	U20 team	25 pts
2021	European Cross Country Championships	Dublin, Ireland	1st	XC 8.0 km U23	24:29
2021	European Cross Country Championships	Dublin, Ireland	2nd	U23 team	24 pts
2022	European Cross Country Championships	Turin, Italy	1st	XC 7.662 km U23	23:40
2022	European Cross Country Championships	Turin, Italy	1st	U23 team	11 pts
2023	European Athletics U23 Championships	Espoo, Finland	1st	5000 metres	13.35:07

Representing the United States
Year	Competition	Venue	Position	Event	Time
2025	2025 New York City Marathon	New York, United States	6th	Marathon	2:09:59
2026	2026 Boston Marathon	Boston, United States	7th	Marathon	2:04:35

=== American championships ===
Representing The Bolles School High School (2015–2019) and Stanford Cardinal (2019–23)
Year	Competition	Venue	Position	Event	Time
2016	NSAF Indoor Nationals	New York, New York	4th	Mile	4:29.97 PB
2018	NSAF Indoor Nationals	New York, New York	9th	Two miles	9:09.27 SB
2019	NSAF Indoor Nationals	New York, New York	3rd	3000 m	8:26.59 PB
2019	NSAF Indoor Nationals	New York, New York	3rd	Two miles	8:59.81 PB
2021	NCAA Division I Cross Country Championships	Stillwater, Oklahoma	14th	10 km	30:21.0
2021	NCAA Division I Championships	Eugene, Oregon	15th	5000 m	13:33.89 SB
2021	NCAA Division I Championships	Eugene, Oregon	7th	10,000 m	27:47.63 SB
2021	NCAA Division I Cross Country Championships	Tallahassee, Florida	4th	10 km	28:47.2
2022	NCAA Division I Indoor Championships	Birmingham, Alabama	3rd	3000 m	8:00.23
2022	NCAA Division I Championships	Eugene, Oregon	6th	10,000 m	28:17.88
2022	NCAA Division I Cross Country Championships	Stillwater, Oklahoma	1st	10 km	28:43.6
2023	NCAA Division I Indoor Championships	Albuquerque, New Mexico	9th	5000 m	14:01.34
2023	NCAA Division I Championships	Eugene, Oregon	6th	5000 m	14:09.03
2023	NCAA Division I Championships	Eugene, Oregon	2nd	10,000 m	28:12.20
