= 2025 European Athletics U23 Championships – Women's 10,000 metres =

Women's 10,000 metres at the 2025 European Athletics U23 Championships
- Venue: Fana Stadion
- Location: Bergen, Norway
- Dates: 18 July
- Competitors: 30 from 22 nations
- Winning time: 32:31.47

Medalists
gold medal	Anika Thompson	Ireland
silver medal	Kira Weis	Germany
bronze medal	Carolina Schäfer	Germany

The women's 10,000 metres event at the 2025 European Athletics U23 Championships was held in Bergen, Norway, at Fana Stadion on 18 July.

== Records ==
Prior to the competition, the records were as follows:

Record	Athlete (nation)	Time (s)	Location	Date
European U23 record	Yasemin Can (TUR)	30:26.41	Rio de Janeiro, Brazil	12 August 2016
Championship U23 record	Alina Reh (GER)	31:39.34	Gävle, Sweden	12 July 2019

== Results ==
Place	Athlete	Nation	Time	Notes
1st place, gold medalist(s)	Anika Thompson	Ireland	32:31.47	NU23R
2nd place, silver medalist(s)	Kira Weis	Germany	32:36.52	PB
3rd place, bronze medalist(s)	Carolina Schäfer	Germany	33:04.43	PB
4	Nele Heymann	Germany	33:27.48	PB
5	Merve Karakaya	Turkey	33:28.64	PB
6	Greta Settino	Italy	33:42.36	
7	Agate Caune	Latvia	33:47.08	NU23R
8	Cordula Lassacher	Austria	33:54.73	
9	Ana Marinho	Portugal	34:02.20	
10	Mădălina-Elena Sîrbu	Romania	34:10.62	
11	Dina Lidahl Lillejordet	Norway	34:41.83	
12	Julia Rosén	Sweden	34:42.47	
13	Elena Eichenberger	Switzerland	34:45.34	
14	Clara Las Heras	Spain	34:47.78	SB
15	Jasmine Wood	Great Britain	34:53.75	
16	Jasmine Emma Trott	Great Britain	34:54.00	
17	Charlotte Penneman	Belgium	34:55.41	
18	Uljana Ratschynska	Ukraine	35:04.85	
19	Heather Murphy	Ireland	35:07.29	
20	Hannah Odgaard Jakobsen	Denmark	35:19.99	PB
21	Anine Dyrdal	Norway	35:32.20	
22	Emma Ranta	Finland	36:18.79	
23	Vilma Sorvisto	Finland	36:19.21	
24	Karolina Bliujūte	Lithuania	36:34.25	
25	Bethine Riise Carlsen	Norway	37:06.38	
26	Dimitra Ntaska	Greece	37:50.25	
—	Marit Griep	Netherlands	DNF	
—	Katarzyna Napiórkowska	Poland	DNF	
—	Ella Sorvisto	Finland	DNF	
—	Iva Gieselová	Czech Republic	DNS	
