= Jonathan Grahn =

Swedish athlete (born 2004)

Personal information
- Nationality: Swedish
- Born: 30 December 2004 (age 21)

Sport
- Sport: Athletics
- Event(s): Long-distance running, Middle-distance running

Achievements and titles
- Personal best(s): 1500m: 3:37.06 (2023) NU20R; Mile: 3:57.03 (2024); 3000m: 7:43.38 (2023) NU20R; 5000m: 13:29.38 (2025); 10000m: 29:05.49 (2025)
Medal record
Men's athletics
Representing Sweden
European U23 Championships
Silver medal – second place	2025 Bergen	10,000 m
European U20 Championships
Gold medal – first place	2023 Jerusalem	3000m
Silver medal – second place	2023 Jerusalem	5000m

Jonathan Grahn (born 30 December 2004) is a Swedish middle- and long-distance runner. He was Swedish national indoor champion over 3000 metres in 2024 and 2026, having also been the 2023 European U20 champion over that distance. He was a silver medalist over 5000 metres at that championships and won a silver medal at the 2025 European Athletics U23 Championships over 10,000 metres.

== Career ==
From Mölndal, at the age of 17 years he set Swedish junior records over 3000 meters (8:02.8m), in Sollentuna, and 1500 metres in Göteborg, in February 2022, his time of 3:45.36, improving Olle Walleräng's previous Swedish junior record from 2004. He had a ninth place finish in the 2022 World Athletics U20 Championships in Cali, Colombia in the 1500 meters final.

The following year, he placed third overall at the senior Swedish Athletics Championships over 1500 metres. Then, he won the silver medal in the 5000 metres and the gold medal in the 3000 metres, at the 2023 European Athletics U20 Championships in Jerusalem, Israel.

He won the 3000 metres race in Karlstad at the Swedish Indoor Athletics Championships for the first senior Swedish national title win of his career in a time of 8:03.67. That June, he was runner-up to Samuel Pihlström at the senior Swedish Athletics Championships in Uddevalla over 1500 metres.

He competed for Sweden at the 2025 European Athletics Team Championships in Madrid in June 2025 placing ninth over 5000 metres. He won the silver medal in a time of 29:05.49 on 17 July in the 10,000 metres at the 2025 European Athletics U23 Championships in Bergen, Norway, finishing 0.04 seconds behind Joel Ibler Lillesø of Denmark, in his debut competitive race in the distance.

Grahn won over 3000 metres at the 2026 Swedish Indoor Championships in Stockholm.
