= Megan Keith =

Scottish athlete (born 2002)

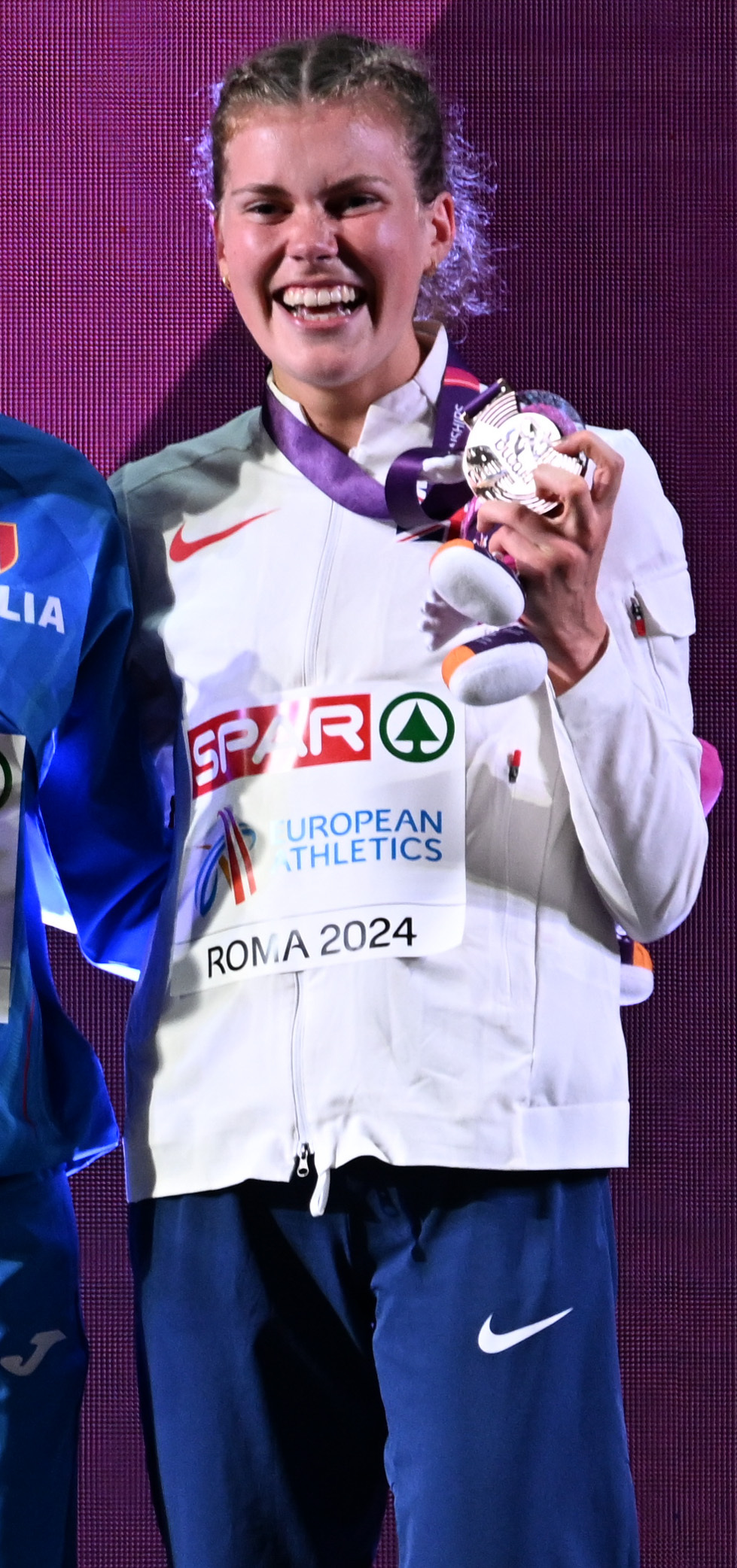
- Megan Keith in 2024

Personal information
- Nationality: Scottish, British
- Born: 23 April 2002 (age 24) Inverness, Scotland
- Height: 1.70 m (5 ft 7 in)

Sport
- Sport: Athletics
- Events: 5000 m, 10,000 m
- Coached by: Ross Cairns

Achievements and titles
- Personal bests: 3000 m: 8:28.35 (Oslo, 2026); 5000 m: 14:43.24 (Suzhou, 2024); 10,000 m: 30:36.84 (San Juan Capistrano, 2024); Road; 10 km: 30:07 AR (Castellon, 2026)
Medal record
Women's athletics
Representing Great Britain
European Championships
Bronze medal – third place	2024 Rome	10,000 m
European U23 Championships
Gold medal – first place	2023 Espoo	5000 m
European Cross Country Championships
Silver medal – second place	2025 Lagoa	Senior race
Silver medal – second place	2025 Lagoa	Team
Gold medal – first place	2023 Brussels	U23 race
Gold medal – first place	2023 Brussels	U23 team
Silver medal – second place	2022 Turin	U23 race
Gold medal – first place	2021 Dublin	U20 race
Representing Scotland
Commonwealth Games
Bronze medal – third place	2026 Glasgow	5000 m
Women's orienteering
Representing Great Britain
Junior World Championships
Gold medal – first place	2019 Silkeborg	Relay

Megan Keith (born 23 April 2002) is a Scottish track and field athlete and cross country runner. She was the 2023 European U23 champion over 5000 metres. She won bronze medals in the 10,000 metres at the 2024 European Athletics Championships and over 5000 metres representing Scotland at the 2026 Commonwealth Games in Glasgow. She set a new European record in 2026 in the 10k run.

== Biography ==
=== Early career ===
During her teenage years, Keith competed in orienteering and won European and World Youth Championship gold medals in the sport, before starting to focus on running at around the ages of 16-17. In 2018, at her international orienteering debut, she became the first ever female to win a gold medal for Great Britain at the European Youth Orienteering Championships in Bulgaria, winning the sprint event by a huge margin of 34 seconds. In 2019, Keith went on to be part of the British relay team that won the Junior World Orienteering Championships in Denmark, the first ever British gold medal in the competition.

Following this success, Keith won Scottish Young Sportswoman of the Year at the Scottish Women in Sport awards. Immediately after this award, Keith came 27th at the 2019 European U20 Cross Country Championship in her debut for Great Britain in athletics.

=== 2021 ===
An Inverness Harriers athlete, and Edinburgh University student, Keith ran a new personal best at the 2021 European Athletics U23 Championships held in Tallinn, running 9:16.50 in the 3000 m. Keith won gold at the European U20 Cross Country Championship in Dublin in December 2021.

=== 2022 ===
In 2022, she became the British under-23 3000 m champion as well as Scottish Under-23 Cross Country Champion. In December, she finished second in the 2022 European Cross Country Championships under-23 race, in Turin.

=== 2023 ===
In February 2023, Keith was named in the Great Britain squad for the 2023 World Athletics Cross Country Championships in Bathurst, Australia, where she placed 53rd.

She was selected as part of the Great Britain team for the 2023 European Athletics U23 Championships held from in July 2023 in Espoo, Finland. She won the 5000 m gold medal ahead of Spaniard Maria Forero and compatriot Eloise Walker. In July 2023, competing at the Diamond League event in London, she set a new 5000m personal best time of 14:56.98. She was chosen to represent Great Britain at the 2023 World Athletics Championships in Budapest in August 2023.

She won the Cardiff Cross Challenge in November 2023. She won the U23 race at the 2023 European Cross Country Championships in Brussels in December 2023 and also claimed gold as part of the British squad which won the U23 team event.

=== 2024 ===
In January 2024, she set a European U23 record running in the Valencia 10K as she posted a time of 31.22 m beating a record set by German athlete Alina Reh in 2018. The run was also the third fastest by a Scots athlete over 10,000 m on the road - with only Liz and Eilish McColgan having recorded faster times. In March 2024, she ran a 10,000 metres time of 30:36.84 in San Juan Capistrano, California, to place fourth on the UK all-time list for the event. The event was the first time that Keith ever ran 10,000m on the track. In April 2024, she set a British under-23 record time of 14:43.24 in the 5000 m at the Diamond League meeting in Shanghai. Keith secured a place in the 10,000 m at the 2024 Summer Olympics by winning the Night of the 10,000 m PBs in London on 18 May having previously achieved the qualifying standard.

She was selected to run the 10,000 metres for Britain at the 2024 European Athletics Championships in Rome. She won her first senior medal taking bronze, in only her third 10,000 metres race on the track in a time of 31:04.07.

Keith was selected to run the 10,000 m at the Olympic Games in Paris. Although she also qualified for the 5000 m, she was not selected. In the 10,000 m final, Keith finished in last place after sustaining an ankle injury, being lapped by the leaders and receiving a time of 33:19.

=== 2025 ===
She competed over 5000 m at the 2025 Golden Gala in Rome, part of the 2025 Diamond League. She retained her British women's 10,000 m national title in Birmingham in June 2025, running a time of 31:19.88. She ran 14:43.80 in the 5000 m at the 2025 London Athletics Meet. In August, she ran a Scottish native record of 4:26.85 at the Monument Mile in Stirling. In September 2025, she competed over 10,000 metres at the 2025 World Championships in Tokyo, Japan, placing tenth overall.

On 8 November 2025, she placed fourth in the women's 6.4km race at the Cardiff Cross Challenge in Wales, a gold race part of the World Athletics Cross Country Tour. Keith placed fourth at the Cross de Atapuerca in Spain on 23 November 2025. On 14 December, Keith recovered from an early fall to win the silver medal behind Nadia Battocletti in the senior women’s race at the 2025 European Cross Country Championships, in Portugal, also leading the British team to a silver medal in the team event.

=== 2026 ===
Keith was the leading British finisher at the 2026 World Athletics Cross Country Championships in Tallahassee, Florida, placing 25th overall. Keith set a new European 10k record in Castellon, Spain on 22 February, running 30:07 to beat the previous best by fellow-Scot Eilish McColgan by one second. Keith ran 67:13 to place third at the New York City Half Marathon in March 2026. In June, Keith ran a personal best 8:28.35 for the 3000 metres at the 2026 Bislett Games.

Keith was named in the Scottish team for the 2026 Commonwealth Games held in Glasgow, Scotland. In her first race Keith placed ninth in the 10,000 metres, before returning to the track on 30 July and winning the bronze medal in the 5000 metres final. Having animated the race by hitting the front with four laps remaining, she was able to jubilantly celebrate the medal at the end of the race in front of a home crowd, including her 100-year-old grandfather. Two weeks later, she finished eighth in the 10,000 metres at the 2026 European Championships in Birmingham. Having moved to front of the race before later fading from the medal positions Keith said afterwards that she felt "disappointed with how my legs were in the last kilometre but I am proud of myself for giving it a good shot at a medal". Competing in the 5k at the 2026 World Athletics Road Running Championships in Copenhagen on 19 September, she finished 15th in 15:19.

== Personal life ==
Keith attended Millburn Academy in Inverness. While a student she won a junior MasterChef competition in 2015. At University Keith studied Sport Science and shared a flat with fellow GB athlete Alyson Bell and triathlete Isla Britton.
