= 2025 European Athletics U23 Championships – Women's 5000 metres =

Women's 5000 metres at the 2025 European Athletics U23 Championships
- Venue: Fana Stadion
- Location: Bergen, Norway
- Dates: 20 July
- Competitors: 26 from 14 nations
- Winning time: 15:43.44

Medalists
gold medal	Maria Forero	Spain
silver medal	Vanessa Mikitenko	Germany
bronze medal	Anika Thompson	Ireland

The women's 5000 metres event at the 2025 European Athletics U23 Championships was held in Bergen, Norway, at Fana Stadion on 20 July.

== Records ==
Prior to the competition, the records were as follows:

Record	Athlete (nation)	Time (s)	Location	Date
European U23 record	Elvan Abeylegesse (TUR)	14:24.68	Bergen, Norway	11 June 2004
Championship U23 record	Yasemin Can (TUR)	15:01.67	Bydgoszcz, Poland	16 July 2017

== Results ==
Place	Athlete	Nation	Time	Notes
1st place, gold medalist(s)	Maria Forero	Spain	15:43.44	
2nd place, silver medalist(s)	Vanessa Mikitenko	Germany	15:51.97	
3rd place, bronze medalist(s)	Anika Thompson	Ireland	15:56.80	
4	Julia David-Smith	France	16:00.62	
5	Pia Schlattmann	Germany	16:06.62	
6	Katarzyna Nowakowska	Poland	16:13.00	
7	Jade le Corre	France	16:14.20	
8	Liv Dinis	Sweden	16:14.95	
9	Agate Caune	Latvia	16:17.24	
10	Jette Beermann	Germany	16:18.28	
11	Agnese Carcano	Italy	16:19.76	
12	Loes Kempe	Netherlands	16:23.27	
13	Anna Marie Nordengen Sirevåg	Norway	16:42.96	
14	Nicole Bauer	Austria	16:45.45	PB
15	Ida Kraft	Sweden	16:48.79	
16	Esmanur Yılmaz	Turkey	16:50.66	
17	Laura Ribigini	Italy	16:52.82	
18	Lucia Arnoldo	Italy	16:54.30	
19	Bieke Schipperen	Netherlands	16:55.39	
20	Maiken Homlung Prøitz	Norway	16:55.50	
21	Ebba Broms	Sweden	16:56.20	
22	Milica Tomašević	Serbia	17:09.91	
—	Hannah Odgaard Jakobsen	Denmark	DNF	
—	Camille Place	France	DNF	
—	Sofia Thøgersen	Denmark	DNF	
—	Ava O'Connor	Ireland	DNS	
