= Jaime Migallón =

Spanish athlete

Personal information
- Born: 22 March 2003 (age 23)

Sport
- Sport: Athletics
- Events: Long-distance running, cross-country
Medal record
Men's athletics
Representing Spain
European U23 Championships
Bronze medal – third place	2025 Bergen	10,000 m
European Cross Country Championships
Bronze medal – third place	2025 Lagoa	U23 Team
Bronze medal – third place	2022 Turin	U20 team

Jaime Migallón (born 22 March 2003) is a Spanish long-distance and cross-country runner.

== Career ==
Migallón is from La Alcarria region, and is a member of CA Unión Guadalajara. He won the 2022 Spanish Cross Country Championship at the under-20 level. That year, he won the Spanish Under-20 Championship over 3000 metres.

At the age of 20 years-old, Migallón finished eighth overall in the 5000 meters at the 2023 European Athletics U23 Championships in July 2023. That month, he won the Spanish U23 Championships over 5000 metres. A title that he retained in 2024, and 2025.

In 2025, Migallon also won the under-23 title at the Spanish 10,000 metres Championships. He then won the bronze medal in the 10,000 metres at the 2025 European Athletics U23 Championships in Bergen, Norway in 29:06.85.

Migallon had a fifth place finish in the men’s under-23 race at the 2025 European Cross Country Championships, winning the bronze medal with the Spanish team. He was subsequently selected for his senior debut representing Spain at the 2026 World Athletics Cross Country Championships in Tallahassee, Florida, placing 56th overall. Competing for Spain in the Long Mixed Relay at the World University Cross Country Championships in March 2026, he won the silver medal. In October, he placed eighth at the Cross Zornotza in Amorebieta.
