= 2023 European Athletics U23 Championships – Women's 5000 metres =

Women's 5000 metres at the 2023 European Athletics U23 Championships
- Venue: Leppävaara Stadium
- Location: Espoo, Finland
- Dates: 13 July
- Competitors: 17 from 12 nations
- Winning time: 15:34.33

Medalists
gold medal	Megan Keith	Great Britain
silver medal	Maria Forero	Spain
bronze medal	Amina Maatoug	Netherlands

The women's 5000 metres event at the 2023 European Athletics U23 Championships was held in Espoo, Finland, at Leppävaara Stadium on 13 July.

== Records ==
Prior to the competition, the records were as follows:

European U23 record	Elvan Abeylegesse (TUR)	14:24.68	Bergen, Norway	11 June 2004
Championship U23 record	Yasemin Can (TUR)	15:01.67	Bydgoszcz, Poland	16 July 2017

== Results ==
Rank	Name	Nationality	Time	Notes
1st place, gold medalist(s)	Megan Keith	Great Britain	15:34.33	
2nd place, silver medalist(s)	Maria Forero	Spain	15:43.22	
3rd place, bronze medalist(s)	Amina Maatoug	Netherlands	15:50.83	
4	Vera Sjöberg	Sweden	15:52.47	PB
5	Eloise Walker	Great Britain	15:55.87	
6	Carina Reicht	Austria	15:56.92	NU23R
7	Lisa Merkel	Germany	15:57.44	
8	Ilona Mononen	Finland	15:57.99	
9	Jane Buckley	Ireland	16:02.22	
10	Blanka Dörfel	Germany	16:02.78	
11	Olimpia Breza	Poland	16:03.36	PB
12	Femke Rosbergen	Netherlands	16:11.23	
13	Rahel Brömmel	Germany	16:32.32	
14	Romane Wolhauser	Switzerland	16:42.37	
15	Mari Ruud	Norway	16:50.33	
	Emmy van den Berg	Netherlands		DNF
