= María Viciosa =

Spanish athlete (born 2006)

Personal information
- Nationality: Spanish
- Born: 3 November 2006 (age 19)

Sport
- Sport: Athletics
- Event(s): Middle-distance, Long-distance, Cross country

Achievements and titles
- Personal best(s): 1500m: 4:21.65 (2024); 3000m: 9:22.43 (2024); 5000m: 17:08.30 (2025)
Medal record
Women's athletics
Representing Spain
European Cross Country Championships
Gold medal – first place	2022 Turin	U20 team
Silver medal – second place	2025 Lagoa	U20 team

Maria Viciosa (born 3 November 2006) is a Spanish middle- and long-distance and cross country runner.

== Career ==
Viciosa finished second in the Spanish U18 Championships in the 2000 metres steeplechase in July 2022. That month, she finished fourth in the 2000 metres steeplechase at the 2022 European Athletics U18 Championships running a personal best 6:40.97 seconds. In October 2022, she beat her older sister Angela Viciosa to win the XVI Isaac Viciosa Urban Mile, a race named after their father. She was a gold medalist in the U20 team race at the 2022 European Cross Country Championships in Turin.

In January 2023, she won the U20 race at the Spanish Cross Country Championships, placing third overall in the senior event, despite being still 18 years old at the time. She was subsequently selected for the 2023 World Athletics Cross Country Championships in Bathurst, New South Wales, Australia. In July 2023, she won the Spanish U18 championships over 1500 metres.

Viciosa won the Spanish U20 Championships 3000 metres race in June 2024, and was subsequently selected for the 2024 World Athletics U20 Championships in Lima, Peru.

In May 2025, she placed fourth at the Spanish U20 5000m Championships. She had an eleventh place finish and won the silver medal in the team event in the under-20 women's race at the 2025 European Cross Country Championships in Portugal.

== Personal life ==
From Valladolid, she is the daughter of distance runner Isaac Viciosa. Her sister Angela Viciosa is also a distance runner.
