= Edward Bird (runner) =

British athlete

Personal information
- Nationality: British
- Born: 11 January 2005 (age 21)

Sport
- Sport: Athletics
- Event: Long distance running

Achievements and titles
- Personal bests: 1500m: 3:43.48 (2024); 3000m: 7:59.99 (2024); 5000m: 13:51.24 (2024)
Medal record
Men's athletics
Representing United Kingdom
World U20 Championships
Bronze medal – third place	2024 Lima	3000m
European U18 Championships
Bronze medal – third place	2022 Jerusalem	3000m

Edward Bird (born 11 January 2005) is a British long-distance runner. He was a bronze medalist at the 2024 World Athletics U20 Championships over 3000 metres.

== Biography ==
Bird was a bronze medalist at the 2022 European Athletics U18 Championships over 3000 metres. That year, he finished inside the top 10 at the 2022 European Cross Country Championships in the under-20 race in Italy.

In the February of the following year, Bird was selected to compete at the World Cross Country Championships in Bathurst, Australia. He was first British man to finish in the men’s U20 race, placing eighteenth and helped the British team to a fifth overall finish in the team event.

Bird won a bronze medal at the 2024 World Athletics U20 Championships over 3000 metres.

In October 2024, Bird was nominated by Athletics Weekly for best British male junior. In November 2024, he was named by British Athletics on the Olympic Futures Programme for 2025.

Bird was named in the British team for the 2025 European Athletics U23 Championships in Bergen. In October 2025, he was retained on the British Athletics Olympic Futures Programme for 2025/26.

In October 2026, he was retained on the 2026/27 Olympic Futures Programme awarded by UK Athletics.

== Personal life ==
From Dorset, he is a member of Poole Athletics Club. He attends the University of Kentucky.
