= Aarón Las Heras =

Spanish long-distance runner (born 2000)

Personal information
- Born: 22 June 2000 (age 26)

Sport
- Sport: Athletics
- Event(s): Middle-distance running, Long-distance running, Cross country running
Medal record
Athletics
Representing Spain
European U23 Championships
Silver medal – second place	2021 Tallinn	5000 m
European U20 Championships
Gold medal – first place	2019 Borås	5000 m
European Cross Country Championships
Gold medal – first place	2025 Lagoa	Team

Aarón Las Heras (born 22 June 2000) is a Spanish middle-, long-distance and cross country runner.

== Biography ==
Las Heras was born in Barcelona but both his parents are from the Province of Soria. He started running as a child at his school in Barcelona, Escola Pàlcam. At the age of eight years-old, he joined AA Catalunya, before later joining Playas de Castellón. Initially, he was a javelin thrower as well as a runner before focusing on running. In 2015, he won at the Spanish U16 Championships, remaining undefeated throughout the outdoor season in long-distance running. In 2017, he broke the broke the Spanish U18 3000 metres record with a time of 8:21.67, a record which stood until broken by Pol Oriach. In 2018, he won U20 Spanish Outdoor Championships in Murcia over 5000 metres. He also finished twelfth at that distance at the 2018 World Athletics U20 Championships in Tampere. That year, he left Spain to study biology at Wake Forest University in the United States.

Coached by Domingo López, he won the gold medal in the 5000 metres race at the 2019 European Athletics U20 Championships in Borås, Sweden, improving his personal best by twelve seconds. He became just the third Spaniard to win the title after Fernando Cerrada in 1973 and Gabriel Navarro in 2011.

He was the silver medalist at the 2021 European Athletics U23 Championships in Tallinn, Estonia, over 5000 metres, finishing behind Mohamed Abdilaahi.

After transferring to Northern Arizona University he placed eighteenth at the 2023 NCAA Cross Country Division One Championships. In January 2024, he placed third behind Berihu Aregawi and Mohamed Katir at the San Silvestre Vallecana, a World Athletics Elite Label 10 km road race, in Madrid, Spain. In February 2024, he won the Most Outstanding Performer award at the Big Sky Conference Indoor Championships, after winning over 5000 metres.

He placed seventeenth overall at the 2024 World Cross Country Championships in Belgrade. He was part of Spain's gold medal-winning team in the senior men's race at the 2024 European Cross Country Championships in Antalya, Turkey, placing fourteenth overall in the individual race.

Las Heras was runner-up at the 2025 Spanish 10,000 metres championships in Getafe. He placed sixth at the Cross Internacional de Itálica near Seville, Spain, in November 2025, a Gold race on the World Athletics Cross Country Tour. Las Heras had a top-ten finish and won gold with the Spanish men's team at the 2025 European Cross Country Championships in Portugal on 14 December 2025. The following weekend, he placed fourth at the Cross Internacional de Venta de Baños on the World Athletics Cross Country Tour. On 31 December, he placed third at the San Silvestre Vallecana, a World Athletics Elite Label event, held in Madrid. He was subsequently selected to represent Spain at the 2026 World Athletics Cross Country Championships in Tallahassee, Florida.
