= Vanessa Mikitenko =

German athlete (born 2005)

Personal information
- Nationality: German
- Born: 7 July 2005 (age 21)

Sport
- Sport: Athletics
- Events: 5000m, Cross country

Achievements and titles
- Personal bests: 1500m: 4:10.10 (Pfungstadt, 2026); 3000m: 8:58.42 (Pliezhausen, 2025); 5000m: 15:18.77 (Nice, 2026)
Medal record
Women's athletics
Representing Germany
European U23 Championships
Silver medal – second place	2025 Bergen	5000m

Vanessa Mikitenko (born 7 July 2005) is a German middle- and long-distance runner. She became German champion over 5000 metres in 2026. She is the daughter of Irina Mikitenko.

== Biography ==
Mikitenko won a silver medal in the 5000 metres at the 2025 European Athletics U23 Championships in Bergen, Norway.

In February 2026, she was runner up to Nele Weßel in the 3000 metres race at the German Indoor Championships, running 9:03.18. As a 21-year-old, she won gold in the 5000 meters at the 2026 German U23 Championships, improving her personal best to 15:18.77. In July, Mikitenko won her first senior title with the win over 5000 metres at the German Athletics Championship in Bochum, running 15:29.46 ahead of Elena Burkard and Lisa Merkel. She was subsequently selected to represent Germany at the 2026 European Athletics Championships in Birmingham, England, in the 5000 metres.

== Personal life ==
Mikitenko is the daughter of runner Irina Mikitenko and the granddaughter of Leonid Mykytenko.
