= Manon Trapp =

French long-distance runner (born 2000)

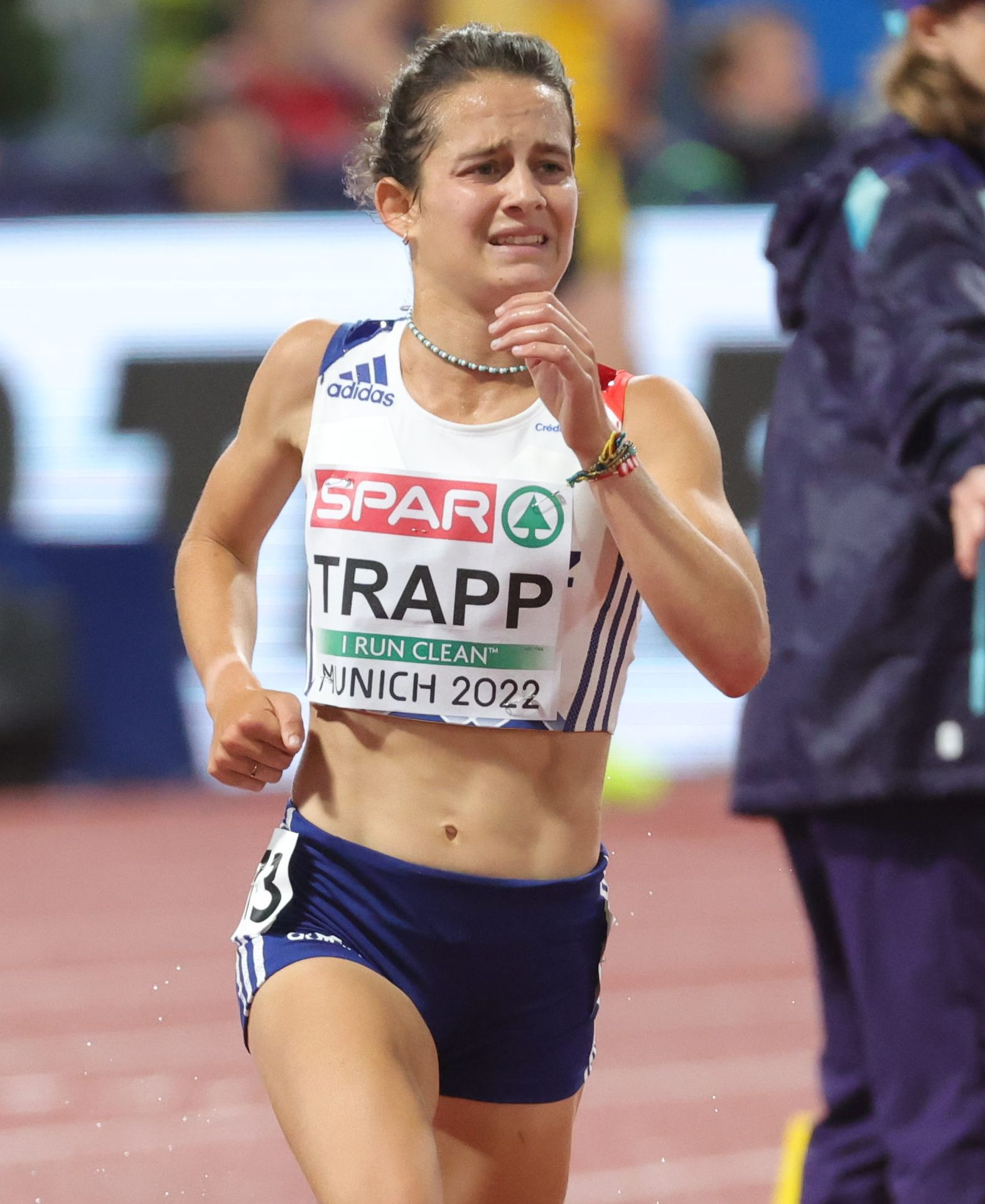
- Trapp at the 2022 European Championships

Personal information
- Born: 1 August 2000 (age 26) Sèvres, France
- Height: 160 cm (5 ft 3 in)
- Weight: 49 kg (108 lb)

Sport
- Country: France
- Sport: Athletics
- Events: Long distance running, Cross country running
Medal record
Women's athletics
Representing France
European Cross Country Championships
Bronze medal – third place	2022 Turin	U23 team

Manon Trapp (born 1 August 2000) is a French long-distance runner. She has won the French Athletics Championships over 5000 metres and is a multiple-time winner of the French Cross Country Championships and a previous holder of the national record in the Marathon.

== Early life ==
From Aix-les-Bains, she competed as a judoka, earning a black belt, before taking up running in 2017 and increasing her focus on athletics.

== Career ==
She won the French Cross Country Championships in 2021, 2022 and 2023, the sixth woman to win three consecutive titles. She finished fourth in the women's U23 race at the 2021 European Cross Country Championships in Dublin, Ireland.

She won the French Athletics Championships on the track over 5000 metres in Caen in 2022. She won the bronze medal in the team event and was sixth in the individual race in the under-23 category at the 2022 European Cross Country Championships in Turin, Italy.

She retained her national title at the French Athletics Championships over 5000 metres in Albi in 2023.

In 2023, she finished 3rd French female at the Half Marathon World Road Running Championships. She ran her first full marathon distance that year on 3 December in Valencia, running a time of 2:25:48.

She set a half marathon personal best of 1:10:56 at the Paris Half Marathon in March 2024. She chose not to defend her French cross country title in 2024 to focus on road running. In February 2025, she became the French marathon national record holder in Seville with a time or 2:23:38.

She was selected for the French team for the 2025 World Athletics Championships in Tokyo, Japan.

Trapp attended the 2024 Summer Olympics as a alternate for the French team.
