= Ellis Cross =

British long-distance runner

Personal information
- Nationality: British (English)
- Born: 22 September 1996 (age 29)

Sport
- Sport: Athletics
- Events: Long distance running, Cross country running
- Club: AFD

Ellis Cross (born 22 September 1996) is a British long-distance runner. He was British champion over 10000 metres in 2022, and runner-up at the British 10000 metres championships in 2025.

== Early life ==
He comes from Polesworth, Warwickshire, just outside of Tamworth, Staffordshire. His first athletics club was Tamworth AC. He was coached by Simon King and from the age of 18 years-old by Mick Woods He was a member of the youth academy of Nottingham Forest but gave up football as a teenager to focus on athletics. He studied at St Mary's University, Twickenham, graduating in 2019.

== Career ==
As a junior runner, he was a two-time English national cross country winner at the under-20 level in 2016 and 2017. He was a two-time British Universities and Colleges Sport (BUCS) champion over 5000 metres. He finished fifth in the 10,000m at the 2017 European Athletics U23 Championships in Bydgoszcz, Poland.

In April 2021, in Ardingly, Sussex, he won the men's 5 km road race in his first listed race over the distance in a time of 14:05.

Cross later became a member of Aldershot, Farnham & District athletics club. Cross made headlines when he defeated Olympic champion Mo Farah at the Vitality London 10,000 in May 2022, running a personal best time of 28:40. This came despite the fact he was a club runner who had to pay a £37 entry fee to race, and the day before he had been working in the athletics equipment shop Up & Running in Surbiton. The £2,000 prize for winning the event was the first individual prize he had collected in his career. Later that year, he was selected for the senior men’s British team for the 2022 European Cross Country Championships in Turin.

In April 2025, he was the top British finisher placing twelfth in a time of 28:30 in the 10 km race at the 2025 European Running Championships in Belgium. He was runner-up at the British 10,000 metres championships in June 2025 in Birmingham, running 28:14.47. Cross ran a 2:10:09 personal best at the Seville Marathon in February 2026. He was third in the British Road 10 km Championships at the Great Manchester Run in England on 31 May 2026, running 28:45.
