= 2025 European Athletics U23 Championships – Men's 10,000 metres =

Men's 10,000 metres at the 2025 European Athletics U23 Championships
- Venue: Fana Stadion
- Location: Bergen, Norway
- Dates: 17 July
- Competitors: 24 from 15 nations
- Winning time: 29:05.45

Medalists
| gold medal | Joel Ibler Lillesø | Denmark |
| silver medal | Jonathan Grahn | Sweden |
| bronze medal | Jaime Migallón | Spain |

The men's 10,000 metres event at the 2025 European Athletics U23 Championships was held in Bergen, Norway, at Fana Stadion on 17 July.

== Records ==
Prior to the competition, the records were as follows:

| Record | Athlete (nation) | Time (s) | Location | Date |
|---|---|---|---|---|
| European U23 record | Ali Kaya (TUR) | 27:24.09 | Mersin, Turkey | 2 May 2015 |
| Championship U23 record | Ali Kaya (TUR) | 27:53.38 | Tallinn, Estonia | 9 July 2015 |

== Results ==
| Place | Athlete | Nation | Time | Notes |
|---|---|---|---|---|
| 1st place, gold medalist(s) | Joel Ibler Lillesø | Denmark | 29:05.45 | PB |
| 2nd place, silver medalist(s) | Jonathan Grahn | Sweden | 29:05.49 | PB |
| 3rd place, bronze medalist(s) | Jaime Migallón | Spain | 29:06.85 | |
| 4 | Antonin Saint-Peyre | France | 29:08.69 | |
| 5 | Gábor Karsai | Hungary | 29:11.26 | PB |
| 6 | Vegard Vesterhaug Warnes | Norway | 29:11.69 | |
| 7 | Nathan Houwaard | Netherlands | 29:13.48 | PB |
| 8 | Abdel Laadjel | Ireland | 29:14.65 | |
| 9 | Nino Freitag | Switzerland | 29:31.39 | |
| 9 | Eric Loré | Spain | 29:31.39 | PB |
| 11 | Stefano Cecere | Italy | 29:32.48 | |
| 12 | Lukas Ehrle | Germany | 29:35.14 | |
| 13 | Timo Hinterndorfer | Austria | 29:39.17 | PB |
| 14 | Baptiste Cartieaux | France | 29:49.84 | |
| 15 | Timothee Dupont | France | 29:54.22 | |
| 16 | Mario Monreal | Spain | 30:03.85 | |
| 17 | Luca Madeo | Germany | 30:06.49 | |
| 18 | Tristan Gevaert | Belgium | 30:08.63 | PB |
| 19 | Wouter Van den Akker | Netherlands | 30:10.25 | |
| 20 | Niall Murphy | Ireland | 30:24.00 | |
| 21 | Juan Zijderlaan | Netherlands | 30:24.67 | PB |
| 22 | Dragoș Luca Pop | Romania | 30:28.88 | SB |
| 23 | Johnny Livingstone | United Kingdom | 31:27.42 | |
| — | Nicolò Cornali | Italy | DNF | |
