= Amina Maatoug =

Dutch athlete (born 2002)

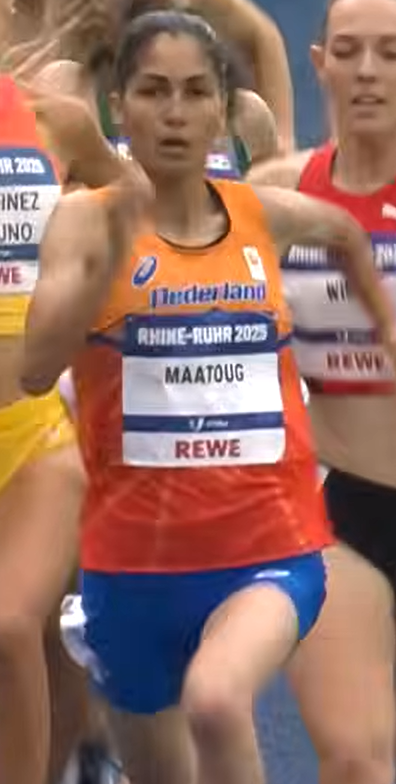
- At the 2025 World University Games

Personal information
- Born: 17 November 2002 (age 23)

Sport
- Sport: Athletics
- Events: Middle-distance running, Cross country running

Achievements and titles
- Personal bests: 800m: 2:03.45 (Louisville, 2023); 1500m: 4:05.67 (Sabbiadoro, 2025); Mile: 4:26.39 NR (Boston, 2025); 3000m: 8:45.60 (Boston, 2026); 5000m: 15:17.04 (Brussels, 2026)
Medal record
Women's athletics
Representing Netherlands
European U23 Championships
Bronze medal – third place	2023 Espoo	5000m

Amina Maatoug (born 17 November 2002) is a Dutch middle-distance and cross country runner. She won the Dutch Indoor Athletics Championships in 2022 over 800 metres. She became the Dutch indoor national record holder in the mile run in 2025.

== Early life ==
She is from Leiden in South Holland. She began training in athletics at the age of six years old after watching her father and sister train for the Leiden Marathon. In 2020, she earned her pre-university education (VWO) diploma and began studying philosophy at Leiden University. She was trained by Han Kulker and Tim Brouwer de Koning at Leiden Athletics.

== Career ==
She won the Dutch Indoor Athletics Championships in Apeldoorn in February 2022 over 800 metres. Later that year, she had a fifth-place finish at the Dutch Athletics Championships over 800 metres. After beginning at Duke University in the United States she ran the 3000 meters indoors in 8:55.62 in Boston, Massachusetts in December which placed her into sixth on the Dutch all-time seniors list. Later that month, she placed fourth in the under-23 women's race at the 2022 European Cross Country Championships in Turin, Italy.

She was a bronze medalist at the 2023 European Athletics U23 Championships in Espoo, Finland, over 5000 metres. Later at the championships, she reached the 1500 meters final, where she finished seventh overall, but ran a personal best time of 4:11.88.

She continued her studies in the United States by transferring from Duke University to the University of Washington in 2024, to be coached by Andy Powell. In February 2025, she ran a Dutch indoor national record running 4:26.39 for the mile run in Boston.

She was runner-up to Marissa Damink at the Dutch Athletics Championships over 1500 metres in August 2025. In September 2025, she competed over 1500 metres at the 2025 World Championships in Tokyo, Japan, without advancing to the semi-finals. She placed sixth in the senior women's race at the 2025 European Cross Country Championships on 14 December 2025, in Lagoa, Portugal. On 28 February, she won the 3000 metres at the 2026 Dutch Indoor Athletics Championships. In August, she competed at the 2026 European Athletics Championships in Birmingham, England, placing seventh in the 5000 metres. In November 2026, she was the leading European with a seventh place finish at the Cross Internacional de Itálica in Seville, Spain.
