= Hiko Tonosa Haso =

Irish athlete

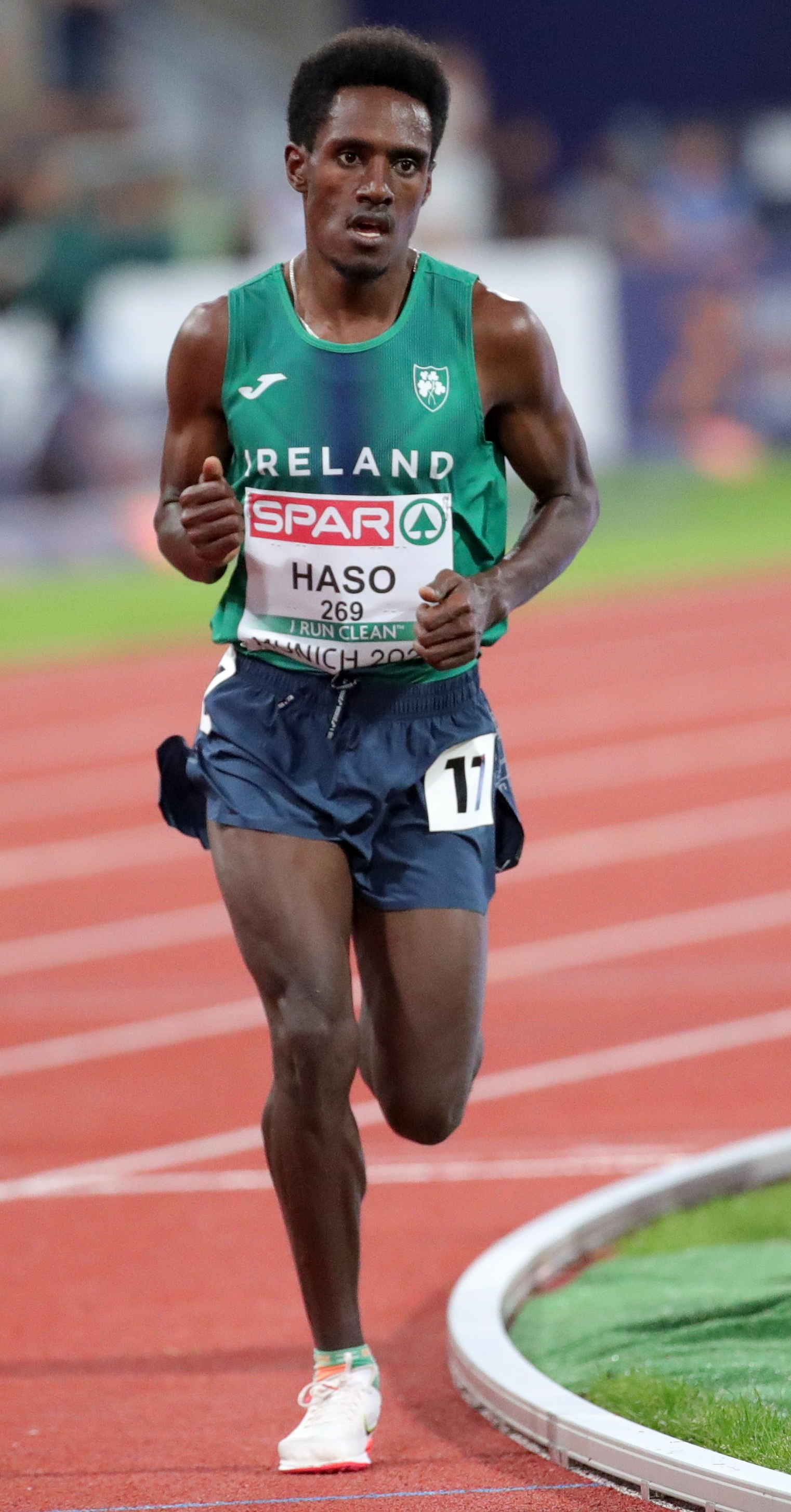
- Haso in 2022

Personal information
- Nationality: Ethiopian, Irish
- Born: 9 October 1995 (age 30) Ethiopia

Sport
- Sport: Athletics
- Event: Long distance running

Achievements and titles
- Personal bests: Marathon: 2:09:42 (Dublin, 2024) NR

Hiko Tonosa Haso (born 9 October 1995) is a long distance runner. Born in Ethiopia, he represents Ireland and gained citizenship in 2020. In 2024, he broke the Irish national record for the marathon and in 2025 equalled the Irish record for the half marathon.

== Early and personal life ==
Tonosa grew up in Ethiopia where, in 2016, he was imprisoned for attending a protest against the government. Whilst competing in Dublin in 2017 he was informed that his best friend at home had been killed for attending a protest against the persecution of the Oromo people, and was told by his family that his life was under threat if he returned home. He sought asylum in Ireland and was placed in direct provision. He gained Irish citizenship in March 2020.

== Career ==
He is a member of Dundrum South Dublin AC. He won national titles in 2021 over 5000 metres and 10,000 metres. He competed at the 2022 European Athletics Championships in Munich in the men's 10,000 metres. He competed at the 2022 European Cross Country Championships in Turin.

He competed in the half marathon at the 2023 World Athletics Road Running Championships in Riga. He competed at the 2024 European Athletics Championships in Rome in the half marathon.

He set a new national record of 2:09:42 to win the national title at the Dublin Marathon on 27 October 2024 placing 3rd overall.

In January 2025, he equalled the Irish national record for the half marathon whilst competing in Spain, running 60:51 in Seville, matching the time set by Efrem Gidey in Copenhagen, the previous September.
