= Angela Viciosa =

Spanish athlete (born 2002)

Personal information
- Nationality: Spanish
- Born: 29 May 2002 (age 24)

Sport
- Sport: Athletics
- Event(s): Long distance running, Cross country running

Achievements and titles
- Personal best(s): 3000m: 9:19.23 (2024); 5000m 16:21.90 (2023)
Medal record
Women's athletics
Representing Spain
European Cross Country Championships
Bronze medal – third place	2023 Brussels	U23 Team
Silver medal – second place	2021 Dublin	U20 Team

Angela Viciosa (born 29 May 2002) is a Spanish long-distance runner from Valladolid. She is the daughter of Spanish long-distance runner Isaac Viciosa.

== Early life ==
She attended the Pinoalbar school in Valladolid in Castile and León. She later studied nursing. A member of the Atletera Isaac Viciosa club in Valladolid, named after her father. She was selected for the world school cross-country championship in 2018 as a 16 year-old.

== Career ==
She made her international debut representing Spain at under-20 level at the 2019 European Cross Country Championships in Lisbon, Portugal. In July 2021, she finished runner-up at the Spanish U20 Championships over 3000 metres. She won a silver medal as part of the Spanish team in the U20 race at the 2021 European Cross Country Championships in Dublin, Ireland, and finished eighth overall in the individual race.

She won the U23 race at the Spanish Cross Country Championships in 2023. She finished fourth in the individual race and won bronze as part of the Spanish team in the U23 race at the 2023 European Cross Country Championships in Brussels, Belgium. She finished third in the senior Spanish Cross Country Championships race in Getafe in January 2024.

In January 2025, she had a top-ten finish at the Cross Internacional Juan Muguerza in Elgoibar. That month, she finished third for a second time at the Spanish Cross Country Championships in Getafe. She had a top-ten finish at the Cross Internacional de Itálica in Spain, in November 2025, a World Athletics Cross Country Tour Gold race. On 14 December, she placed eighteenth at the 2025 European Cross Country Championships in Lagoa, Portugal, in the senior women's race. The following weekend, she placed fourth at the Cross Internacional de Venta de Baños on the World Athletics Cross Country Tour. On 10 January 2026, she placed 51st overall at the 2026 World Athletics Cross Country Championships.

== Personal life ==
She is the daughter of Spanish distance runner Isaac Viciosa. Her siblings Carmen, Pedro and Maria are also competitive runners.
