= Carolina Schäfer =

German long-distance runner

Personal information
- Born: 25 July 2004 (age 21)

Sport
- Sport: Athletics
- Event(s): Long distance running, Cross country running

Achievements and titles
- Personal best(s): 3000m: 9:14.58 (Pliezhausen, 2025); 5000m: 15:41.82 (Bochum, 2025); 10,000m: 33:04.43 (Bergen, 2025)
Medal record
Women's athletics
Representing Germany
European U23 Championships
Bronze medal – third place	2025 Bergen	10000m

Carolina Schäfer (born 25 July 2004) is a German long distance runner.

== Career ==
Schäfer competes for TG Schwalbach. She won the U23 5 km road race at the BARMER Alsterlauf in Hamburg in September 2024.

At the German 10,000 metres Championships in Hamburg in May 2025, she finished fourth overall and second in the U23 category. She ran a personal best 33:04.43 to win the bronze medal in the 10,000 metres at the 2025 European Athletics U23 Championships in Bergen, Norway on 18 July 2025, behind race winner Anika Thompson of Ireland and her German compatriot Kira Weis. The following week she placed seventh at the 2025 Summer World University Games in Germany in the 5000 metres, with a personal best of 15:41.82.
