= Pasquale Selvarolo =

Italian long-distance runner

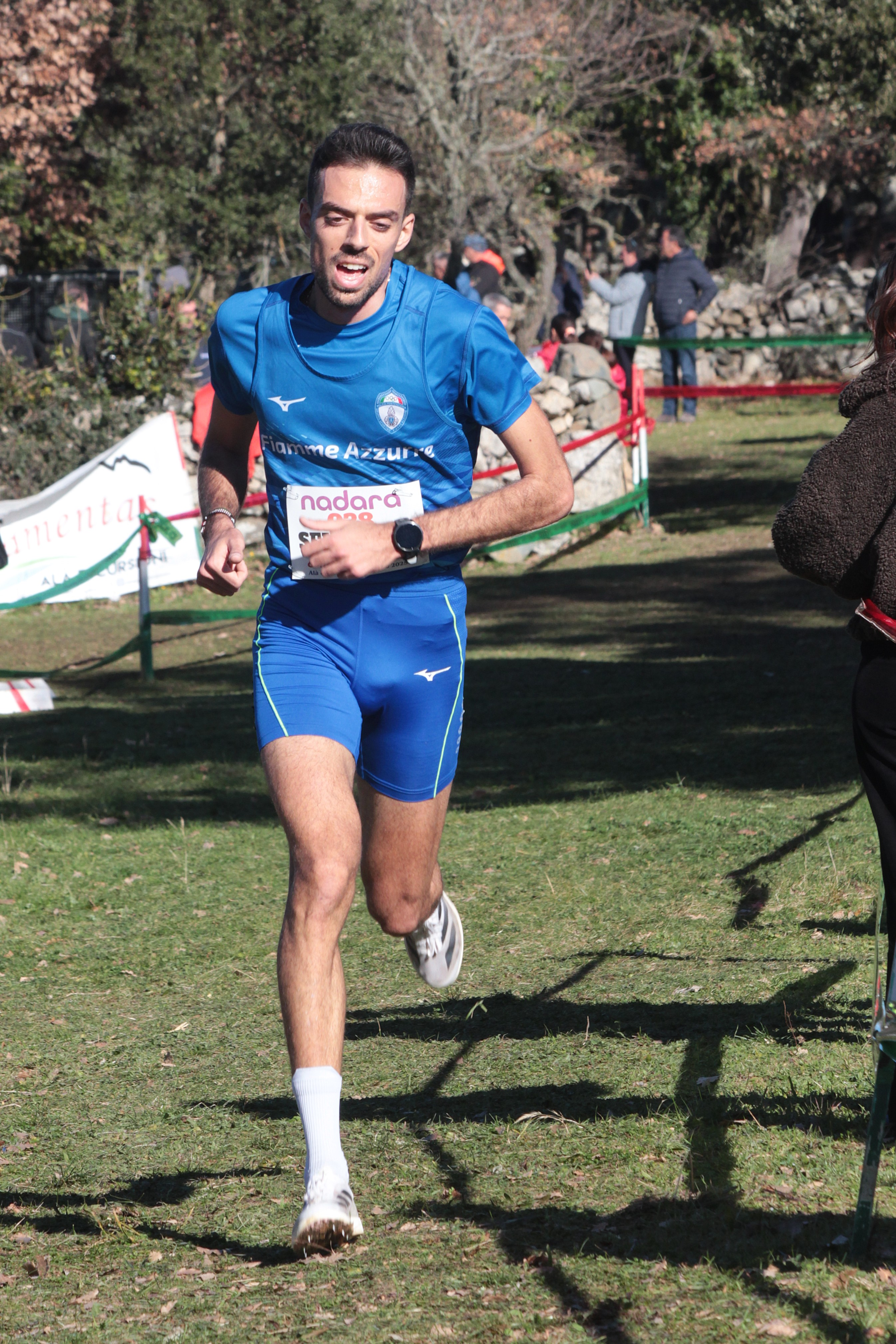
- Selvarolo in 2025 cross country

Personal information
- National team: Italy
- Born: 28 November 1999 (age 26) Andria, Italy
- Height: 1.86 m (6 ft 1 in)
- Weight: 70 kg (154 lb)

Sport
- Sport: Athletics
- Event: Long-distance running
- Club: Fiamme Azzurre
- Coached by: Piero Incalza

Achievements and titles
- Personal bests: 5000 m: 13:47.53 (2022); 10,000 m: 28:30.35 (2022); Half marathon: 1:00:32 (2023)
Medal record
Men's athletics
Representing Italy
Event	1st	2nd	3rd
European Championships	1	0	0
European Cross Country C'ships	0	2	0
Total	1	2	0
European Championships
Silver medal – second place	2024 Rome	Half Marathon

Pasquale Selvarolo (born 28 November 1999) is an Italian long-distance runner European champion with the national team at Roma 2024 in the Half Marathon Cup.

== Career ==
He is among the Italian national athletics team's squad members for the 2026 Mediterranean Games.

== Achievements ==
Year	Competition	Venue	Rank	Event	Time	Notes
2024	European Championships	(Italy) Rome	6th	Half Marathon	1:01:27	SB
2024	European Championships	(Italy) Rome	1st	Half Marathon Cup	3:08:34	

== National titles ==
Selvarolo won one national championship at individual senior level.

- Italian Cross Country Championships
  - Long race: 2024

== See also ==
+ Italian team at the running events
