= María Forero =

Spanish athlete (born 2002)

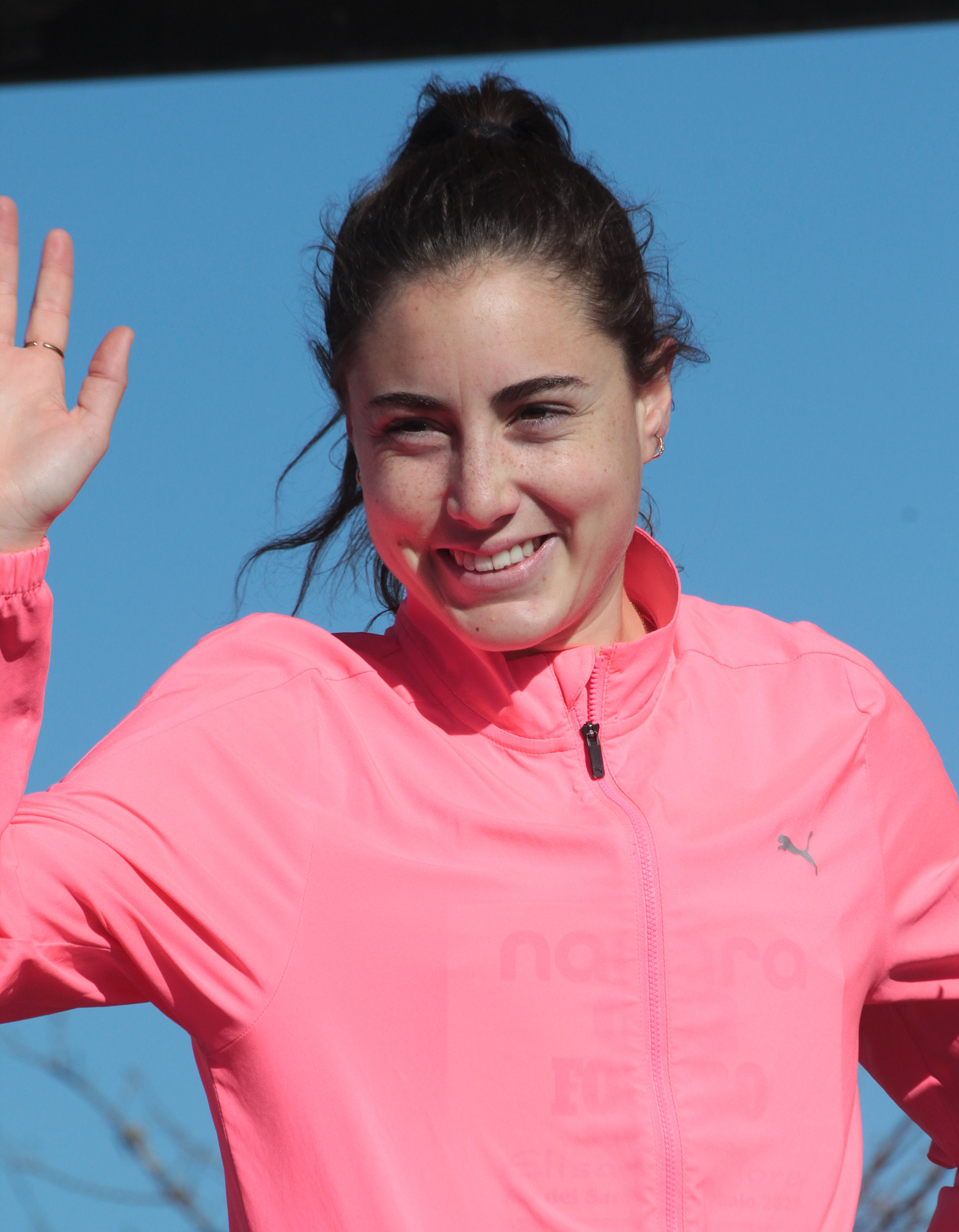

Personal information
- Nationality: Spanish
- Born: 24 March 2003 (age 23)

Sport
- Sport: Athletics
- Events: 5000m, Cross country

Achievements and titles
- Personal bests: 1500m: 4:14.64 (Ordizia, 2023); 3000m: 9:25.14 (Torrent, 2022); 5000m: 15:23.79 (Berge, 2024) NU23R
Medal record
Women's athletics
Representing Spain
World U20 Championships
Bronze medal – third place	2022 Cali	5000 m
European U23 Championships
Gold medal – first place	2025 Bergen	5000m
Silver medal – second place	2023 Espoo	5000m
European Cross Country Championships
Gold medal – first place	2025 Lagoa	U23 race
Silver medal – second place	2024 Antalya	U23 race
Bronze medal – third place	2025 Lagoa	U23 team
Bronze medal – third place	2023 Brussels	U23 team
Gold medal – first place	2022 Turin	U20 race
Gold medal – first place	2022 Turin	U20 team
Silver medal – second place	2021 Dublin	U20 race
Youth Olympic Festival
Bronze medal – third place	2019 Baku	3000m

María Forero (born 24 March 2003) is a Spanish track and field athlete and cross country runner.

== Biography ==
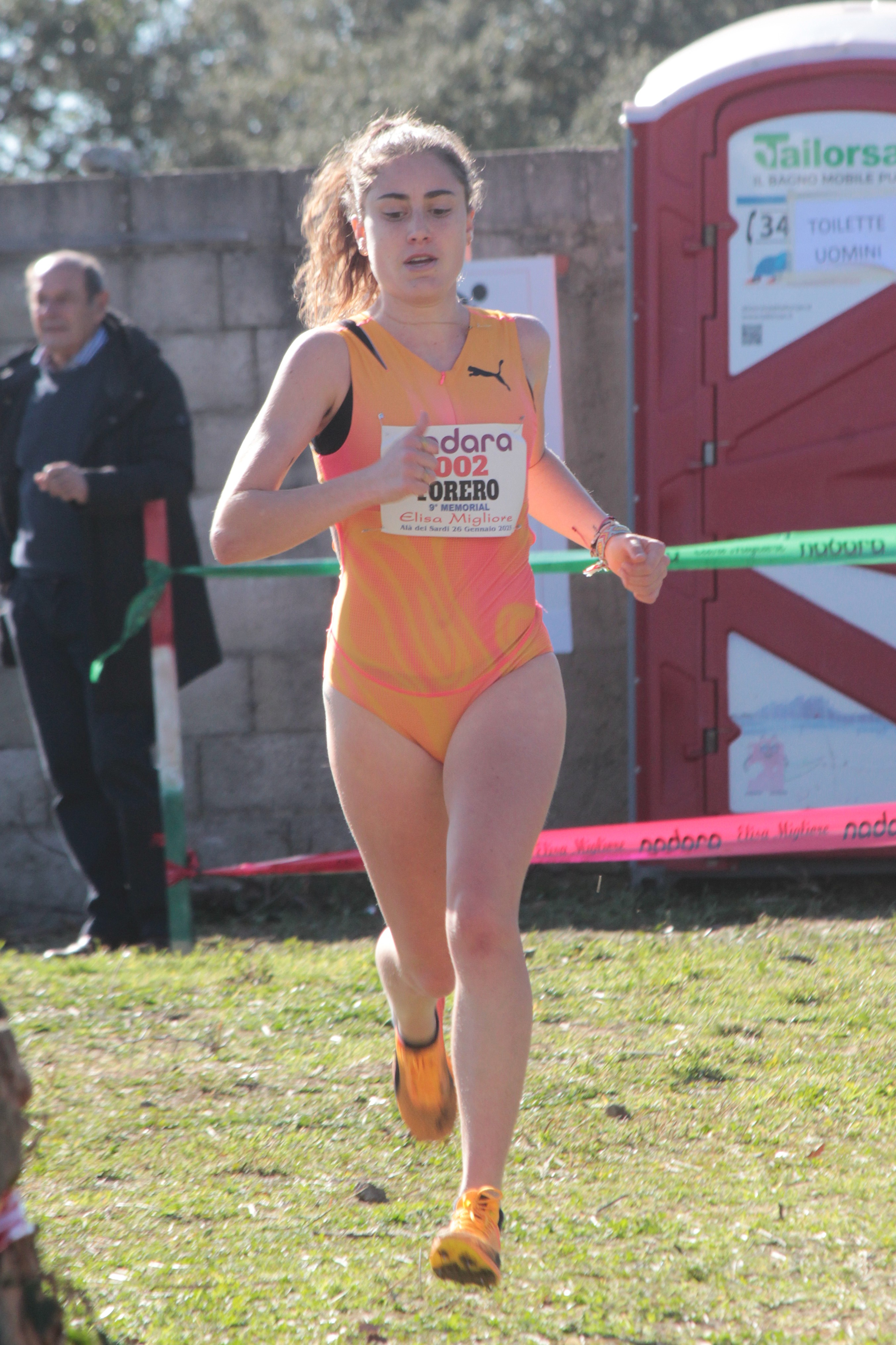
Marìa Forero in a Country Cross race in Sardinia

From Huelva in Andalusia, she was selected to represent Spain at the 2019 European Cross Country Championships U20 race aged 17 years-old. That year, she was a bronze medalist in the 3000 metres at the 2019 European Youth Olympics in Baku.

In 2020, she became Spanish U18 champion over 5000 metres, running 17:20.41 in Tarragona, breaking the championship record by seven seconds.

In 2021, she was a silver medalist in the U20 team event at the 2021 European Cross Country Championships in Dublin. She moved to León to the training group led by José Enrique Villacorta and which already included international runners such as Roberto Aláiz and Blanca Fernández. In August 2022, she won the 5000m bronze medal at the U20 World Athletics Championships in Cali, Colombia (originally finished fifth behind Medina Eisa and Melknat Wudu, but Eisa and Wudu was later given an two-year ban for age falsification violations and stripped of their gold and silver medals).

In November 2022, she became Spanish national U20 cross country champion. Forero was a double gold medalist at the 2022 European Cross Country Championships in Turin, winning both the individual title and the team event with Spain.

She won the 5000m silver medal at the 2023 European Athletics U23 Championships in Espoo, Finland in July 2023.

She was selected for the 2024 European Athletics Championships in Rome in June 2024. That month, she set a new Spanish U23 record for the 5000 metres, running 15:23.79 in Norway.

In December 2024, she won the silver medal in the U23 race at the European Cross Country Championships in Antalya, Turkey.

In February 2025, she finished fourth at the Almond Blossom Cross Country on the World Athletics Cross Country Tour. In July 2025, she won the 5000 metres at the outdoor Spanish U23 Championships in Badajoz. Later that month, she won the 5000 metres at the 2025 European Athletics U23 Championships in Bergen, Norway.

On 2 November, she won the Cross Ponte Romana in Lugo. Ferero finished fifth at the Cross Internacional de Itálica later that month, a World Athletics Cross Country Tour Gold race. On 14 December, she was the gold medalist in the under-23 category at the 2025 European Cross Country Championships in Portugal, also winning the bronze medal in the team event. The following weekend, she placed second at the Cross Internacional de Venta de Baños on the World Athletics Cross Country Tour.

Competing in the women's senior race at the 2026 World Athletics Cross Country Championships in Tallahassee, Florida, she was the leading European finisher in 14th place. Competing in the short course race at the World University Cross Country Championships in March 2026, she won the silver medal in the team competition alongside Marta Serrano. In April, she placed fourth in 31:17 on the road at the 10km en Ruta Villa de Laredo in Spain. In August, she competed at the 2026 European Athletics Championships in Birmingham, England, placing eighth overall in the 5000 metres. In November, she had a top-ten finish at the Cross Internacional de Itálica in Seville.
