= Ann Marie McGlynn =

Irish long-distance runner

Personal information
- Citizenship: Irish
- Born: 22 February 1980 (age 45)
- Home town: Tullamore, County Offaly

Sport
- Country: Ireland
- Sport: Long-distance running
- Club: Letterkenny AC

Ann Marie McGlynn (Note: Sometimes spelled as Ann-Marie McGlynn.) (born 22 February 1980) is an Irish long-distance runner. In 2020, she competed in the women's half marathon at the 2020 World Athletics Half Marathon Championships held in Gdynia, Poland. In 2024, she won the Dublin Marathon and the Irish national cross country championship. In doing so, she became the first athlete to win the Irish national marathon and cross country titles in the same year.
