= 2021 European Athletics U23 Championships – Men's 5000 metres =

Men's 5000 metres at the 2021 European Athletics U23 Championships
- Venue: Kadriorg Stadium, Tallinn
- Dates: 10 July
- Competitors: 30 from 17 nations
- Winning time: 13:38.69

Medalists
gold medal	Mohamed Mohumed	Germany
silver medal	Aarón Las Heras	Spain
bronze medal	Baldvin Magnússon	Iceland

The men's 5000 metres event at the 2021 European Athletics U23 Championships was held in Tallinn, Estonia, at Kadriorg Stadium on 10 July. The race was controversially split into A and B races based on season's best performances. The athletes were not informed of this until the week of the competition, giving no opportunity to improve their season's best and ensure their place in the A race.

== Records ==
Prior to the competition, the records were as follows:

European U23 record	Ali Kaya (TUR)	13:00.31	Rome, Italy	4 June 2015
Championship U23 record	Ali Kaya (TUR)	13:20.16	Tallinn, Estonia	11 July 2015

== Results ==
Rank	Heat	Name	Nationality	Time	Notes
1st place, gold medalist(s)	A	Mohamed Mohumed	Germany	13:38.69	
2nd place, silver medalist(s)	A	Aarón Las Heras	Spain	13:43.14	
3rd place, bronze medalist(s)	A	Baldvin Magnússon	Iceland	13:45.00	NR
4	A	Thomas Mortimer	Great Britain	13:48.67	
5	A	Florian Le Pallec	France	13:56.74	
6	A	Magnus Tuv Myhre	Norway	13:59.56	
7	A	Simen Halle	Norway	13:59.99	
8	B	Francesco Guerra	Italy	14:02.63	PB
9	B	Alain Cavagna	Italy	14:02.83	
10	A	Valentin Gondouin	France	14:03.46	
11	A	Guillaume Grimard	Belgium	14:04.37	
12	B	Marios Anagnostou	Greece	14:06.94	PB
13	A	Isaac Akers	Great Britain	14:07.07	
14	A	Micheal Power	Ireland	14:10.04	
15	A	Tim Verbaandert	Netherlands	14:13.61	
16	B	Dereje Chekole	Israel	14:14.10	
17	B	Aleksander Wiącek	Poland	14:22.09	
18	B	Ömer Amaçtan	Turkey	14:22.90	
19	B	Rogério Amaral	Portugal	14:23.29	
20	B	Omar Ismail	Sweden	14:25.05	
21	B	Darragh McElhinney	Ireland	14:25.38	
22	B	Rúben Amaral	Portugal	14:27.96	
23	B	Mathias Flak	Norway	14:29.61	
24	A	Antonio López	Spain	14:42.07	
25	B	Alexandre Figueiredo	Portugal	14:45.09	
26	B	Elias Schreml	Germany	14:53.59	
27	A	Diego Bravo	Spain	15:04.66	
28	B	Jonatan Gustafsson	Sweden	15:12.72	
29	B	Andry Soo	Estonia	15:51.89	
	A	Rory Leonard	Great Britain	DNF	
