= Mohamed Abdilaahi =

German long-distance runner

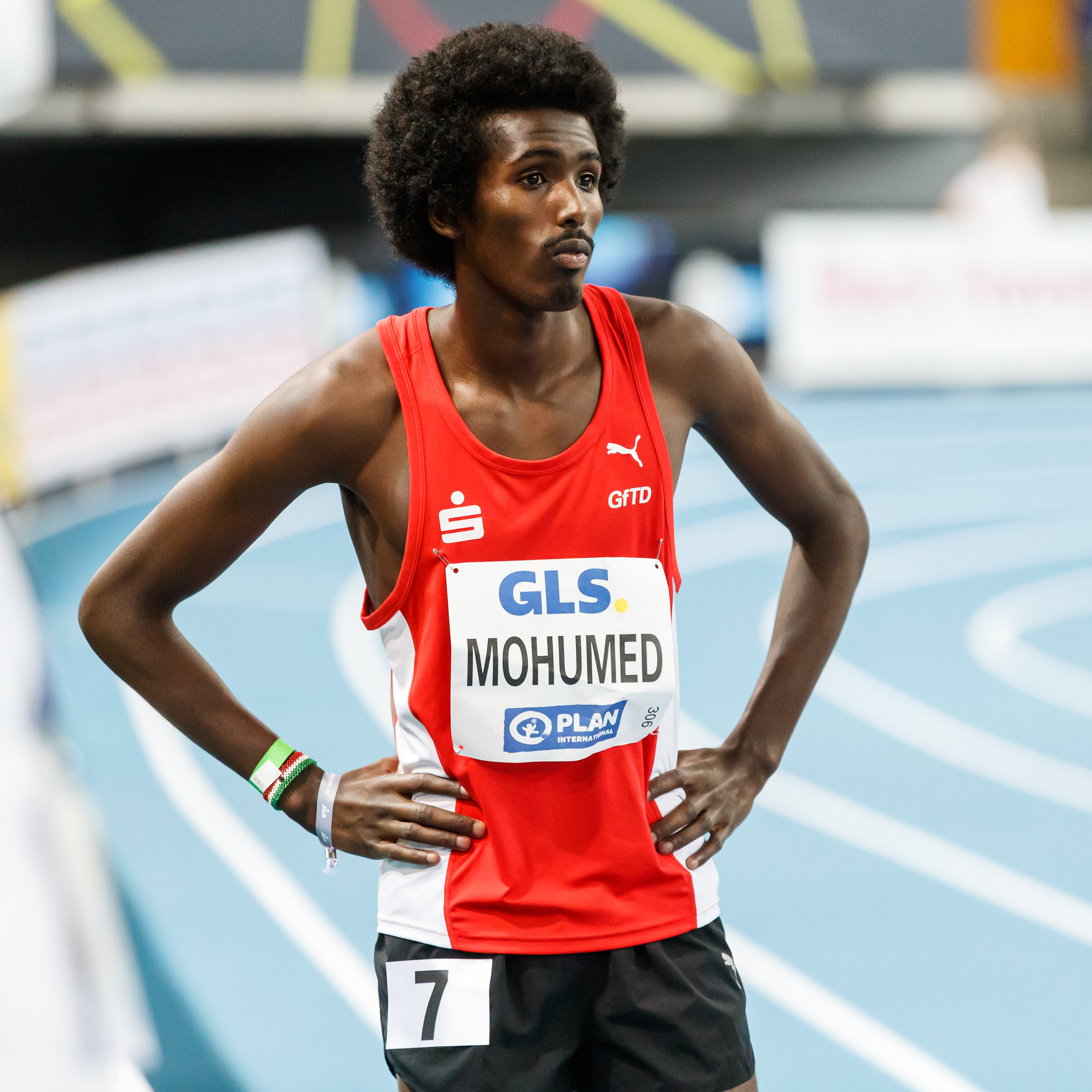
- 2022 in Leipzig

Personal information
- Nationality: German
- Born: Mohamed Mohumed; 24 March 1999 (age 27) Mönchengladbach, Germany
- Height: 1.85 m (6 ft 1 in)
- Weight: 67 kg (148 lb)

Sport
- Sport: Athletics
- Events: 1500 m, 3000 m, 5000 m, 10,000 m
- Club: DJK VfL Willich (–2016); LG Olympia Dortmund (2017–2024); Cologne Athletics (2025–)
- Coached by: Tim Moriau

Achievements and titles
- Personal bests: 800 m: 1:50.15 (Köln, 2022); 1500 m: 3:35.69 (Bydgoszcz, 2022); 3000 m: 7:25.77 min (Keqiao, 2026); 5000 m: 12:53.63 (Monaco, 2025); 10,000 m: 26:56.58 (San Juan Capistrano, 2026) NR
Medal record
Athletics
Representing Germany
European U23 Championships
Gold medal – first place	2021 Tallinn	5000 m
European Cross Country Championships
Bronze medal – third place	2019 Lisbon	U23 Team
Bronze medal – third place	2018 Tilburg	Junior Team
German Championships
Gold medal – first place	2020 Braunschweig	5000 m
Gold medal – first place	2021 Braunschweig	5000 m
German Indoor Championships
Gold medal – first place	2021 Dortmund	3000 m

Mohamed Abdilaahi (born as Mohamed Mohumed on 24 March 1999) is a German long-distance runner. He competed in the 5000 metres at the 2020 Summer Olympics. Abdilaahi set the German national record for 10,000 meters at 2026 edition of The TEN.

Born in Germany, he is of Somali descent.

== Achievements ==
Information from World Athletics unless otherwise noted.

=== International competitions ===
Representing Germany
Year	Competition	Venue	Position	Event	Time	Notes
2021	Olympic Games	Tokyo, Japan	31st (h)	5000 m	13:50.46	
2022	World Championships	Eugene, OR, United States	33rd (h)	5000 m	13:52.00	
2024	European Championships	Rome, Italy	26th	5000 m	13:58.89	
2025	World Championships	Tokyo, Japan	29th (h)	5000 m	13:44.68	

=== National titles ===
- German Championships (3)
  - 5000 metres: 2020, 2021, 2022
- German Indoor Championships (1)
  - 3000 metres: 2021
