= Joel Ibler Lillesø =

Danish athlete

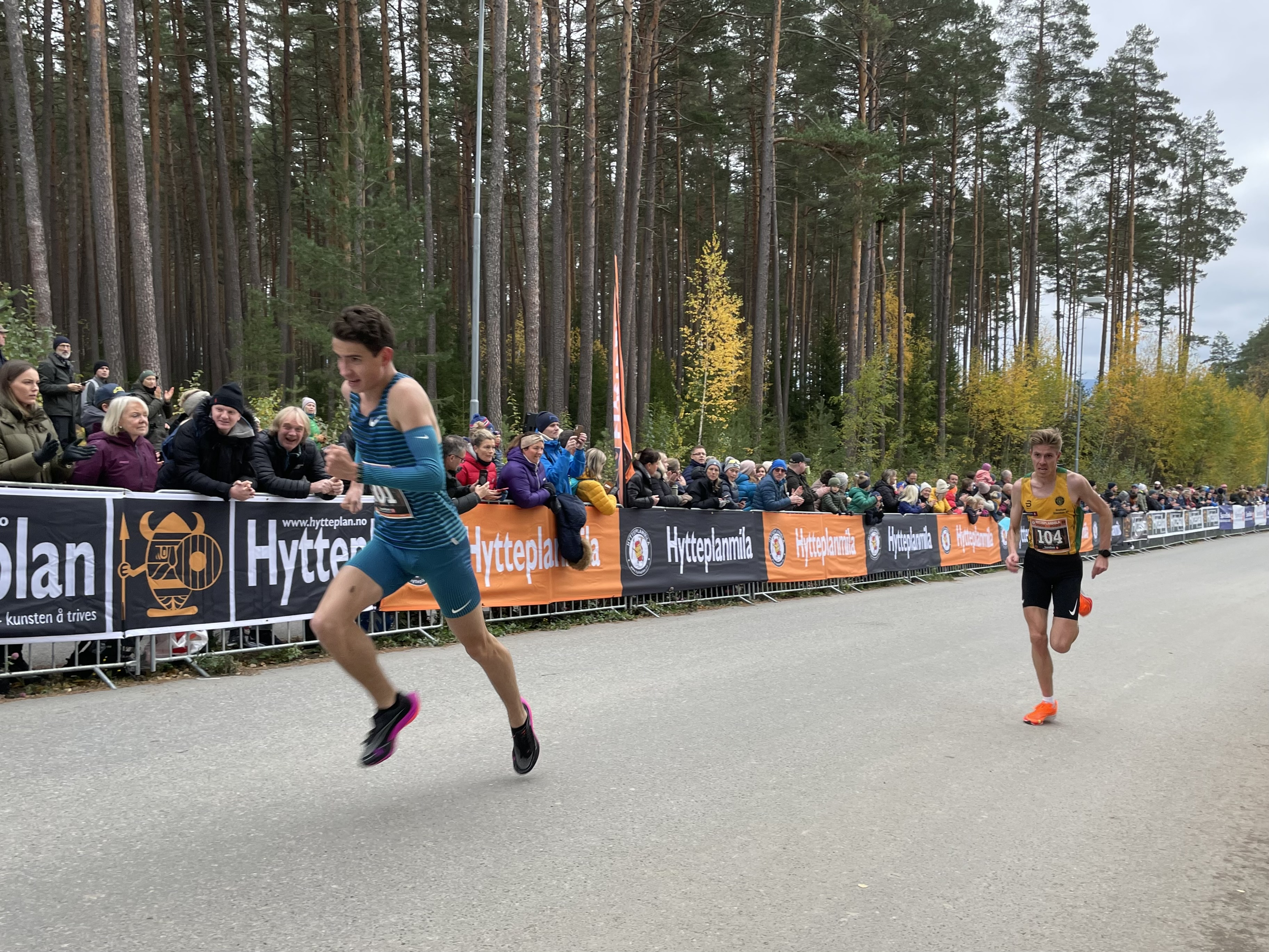
- Lillesø in 2022

Personal information
- Nationality: Danish
- Born: 17 November 2003 (age 22)

Sport
- Sport: Athletics
- Events: Long-distance running, cross-country

Achievements and titles
- Personal bests: 1500m: 3:41.62 (Oslo, 2024); 3000m: 7:47.72 (Nembro, 2024); 5000m: 13:14.98 (Oordegem, 2025) NR; 10000m: 29:05.45 (Bergen, 2025); Road; 10k: 27:55 (Lille, 2026) NR
Medal record
Men's athletics
Representing Denmark
European U23 Championships
Gold medal – first place	2025 Bergen	10,000 m
European U20 Championships
Gold medal – first place	2021 Tallinn	5000 m
European Cross Country Championships
Bronze medal – third place	2024 Antalya	U23 Team
Bronze medal – third place	2021 Dublin	U20 race

Joel Ibler Lillesø (born 17 November 2003) is a Danish long-distance runner. He is the Danish national record holder over 5000 metres and the 10k run.

== Biography ==
He is a member of Bagsværd Athletics Club. He won the 2021 European Athletics U20 Championships over 5000 metres in Tallinn, Estonia. He won the individual bronze medal in the U20 race at the 2021 European Cross Country Championships in Dublin, Ireland behind the gold medal winner, his compatriot Axel Vang Christensen.

At the age of 18 years-old he broke Jakob Ingebrigtsen's European indoor U20 3000m record in Sollentuna in January 2022, running 7:48.34. He finished sixth over 3000 metres at the 2022 World Athletics U20 Championships in Cali, Colombia. He competed for Denmark at the 2022 European Athletics Championships in Munich over 5000 metres.

He competed for Denmark at the 2023 European Athletics Indoor Championships in Istanbul over 3000 metres. He ran in the 5 km road race at the 2023 World Athletics Road Running Championships in Latvia.

In June 2024, Lillesø improved the Danish national record for 5000 meters in Heusden-Zolder, Belgium, running 13:22.74. That summer, he missed some competitive action due to a stress fracture in his foot. In November 2024, he won the senior race at the Nordic Cross Country Championships in Vantaa, Finland. He competed at the 2024 European Cross Country Championships, in Antalya, Turkey in December 2024, placing seventh in the U23 men's race and winning the bronze medal in the team event.

He was selected for the 2025 European Athletics Team Championships Second Division in Maribor in June 2025, finishing third overall in the 5000 metres. He won the 10,000 metres at the 2025 European Athletics U23 Championships in Bergen, Norway in a personal best time of 29:05.45.

He placed sixth at the senior Nordic Cross Country Championships in Kastrup, Denmark, on 9 November 2025. He had a fourth-place finish at the 2025 European Cross Country Championships in the men's under-23 race after a close battle for the final medal place with Frenchman Pierre Boudy.

On 4 April 2026, Lillesø broke the Danish record for 10k run at the Urban Trail de Lille in France, running 27:55 to become the first Dane in history to break the 28 minute-barrier for 10 km. Later that month, he won the Danish 10k title in Århus. In August, he competed at the 2026 European Athletics Championships in Birmingham, England, in the 5000 metres, placing fifteenth.
