= Anika Thompson =

Irish long-distance runner

Personal information
- Born: 22 February 2003 (age 23)

Sport
- Sport: Athletics
- Event(s): Long distance running, Cross country running

Achievements and titles
- Personal best(s): 3000m: 9:05.75 (Fayetteville, 2025); 5000m: 15:31.93 (Boston, 2024); 10,000m: 32:31.47 (Bergen, 2025)
Medal record
Women's athletics
Representing Ireland
European U23 Championships
Gold medal – first place	2025 Bergen	10000m
Bronze medal – third place	2025 Bergen	5000m

Anika Thompson (born 22 February 2003) is an Irish long-distance runner. She won the 10,000 metres at the 2025 European Athletics U23 Championships.

== Career ==
Born and raised in Oregon but representing Ireland through her Mother from Cork, Ireland, she is a member of Leevale Athletics Club. Speaking in 2025, she said "I grew up going to Ireland every summer and it was a dream of mine to grow up and represent Ireland in track and field".

She won the Irish national U20 cross country race in Donegal in November 2022. She subsequently made her international debut for Ireland at the 2022 European Cross Country Championships in Turin, Italy finishing 52nd.

She lowered her personal best for the 10,000 metres to 33:51.70 in March 2023 at Hayward Field in Eugene, Oregon. She was later selected for the 2023 European Athletics U23 Championships in the 10,000m, finishing in eleventh place overall in Espoo, Finland.

She broke the U23 10,000m Irish national record in California in March 2024. She ran for Ireland over that distance at the 2024 European Athletics Championships in Rome, placing twentieth overall.

Competing for the University of Oregon she finished seventh in the West Regionals cross country championships to help the Oregon Ducks gain automatic equalisation for the 2024 NCAA Cross Country Championships. She finished second over 5000 metres and fourth over 3000 metres at the Big Ten Conference Indoor Championships in February 2025.

She ran a 20-second personal best and set a new Irish under-23 record to win the gold medal in the 10,000 metres at the 2025 European Athletics U23 Championships in Bergen, Norway on 18 July 2025, running a time of 32:31.47. She returned to the championship two days later and won the bronze medal over 5000 metres.

Thompson had a top-ten finish at the NCAA West Regional cross country championships on 14 November 2025 at in Sacramento, California, helping to Oregon Ducks to a second-place finish.
