= 2019 European Cross Country Championships =

- Organisers: EAA
- Edition: 26th
- Host city: Lisbon, Portugal
- Events: 7
- Distances: ~10 km – Men; ~8 km – Women; ~6 km – Mixed relay ~8 km – U23 men ~6 km – U23 women ~6 km – U20 men ~4 km – U20 women
- Participation: 606 athletes from 40 nations

The 2019 European Cross Country Championships is the 26th edition of the European Cross Country Championships. It was held 8 December 2019, hosted by Lisbon, Portugal. It was the third occasion that Portugal has hosted the championships.

== Medal summary ==
Event	Gold		Silver		Bronze	
Senior men	Aras Kaya (TUR)	30:10	Yemaneberhan Crippa (ITA)	30:21	Julien Wanders (SUI)	30:25
Senior women	Yasemin Can (TUR)	26:52	Karoline Bjerkeli Grøvdal (NOR)	27:07	Samrawit Mengsteab (SWE)	27:43
U23 men	Jimmy Gressier (FRA)	24:17	Elzan Bibić (SRB)	24:25	Abdessamad Oukhelfen (ESP)	24:34
U23 women	Anna Emilie Møller (DEN)	20:30	Jasmijn Lau (NED)	21:09	Stephanie Cotter (IRL)	21:15
U20 men	Jakob Ingebrigtsen (NOR)	18:20	Ayetullah Aslanhan (TUR)	18:58	Efrem Gidey (IRL)	19:01
U20 women	Nadia Battocletti (ITA)	13:58	Klara Lukan (SLO)	14:01	Mariana Machado (POR)	14:10
Senior men's team	Great Britain (GBR); Andrew Butchart; Ben Connor; Kristian Jones	33 pts	Belgium (BEL); Soufiane Bouchikhi; Isaac Kimeli; Lahsene Bouchikhi	35 pts	Spain (ESP); Antonio Abadía; Carlos Mayo; Fernando Carro	42 pts
Senior women's team	Great Britain (GBR); Jessica Judd; Charlotte Arter; Abbie Donnelly	26 pts	Ireland (IRL); Fionnuala McCormack; Aoibhe Richardson; Ciara Mageean	41 pts	Portugal (POR); Ana Dulce Félix; Carla Salomé Rocha; Susana Francisco	43 pts
U23 men's team	France (FRA); Jimmy Gressier; Fabien Palcau; Mohamed-Aminen El Bouajaji	17 pts	Italy (ITA); Yohanes Chiappinelli; Jacopo De Marchi; Sebastiano Parolini	29 pts	Germany (GER); Davor Aaron Bienenfeld; Markus Görger; Mohamed Mohumed	45 pts
U23 women's team	Netherlands (NED); Jasmijn Lau; Jasmijn Bakker; Diane van Es	17 pts	Ireland (IRL); Stephanie Cotter; Eilish Flanagan; Roisin Flanagan	29 pts	Great Britain (GBR); Bronwen Owen; Amelia Quirk; Poppy Tank	40 pts
U20 men's team	Great Britain (GBR); Charles Hicks; Matthew Willis; Zakariya Mamamed	25 pts	Norway (NOR); Jakob Ingebrigtsen; Håkon Stavik; Ibrahim Buras	38 pts	Portugal (POR); Etson Barros; Duarte Gomes; Miguel Moreira	39 pts
U20 women's team	Great Britain (GBR); Izzy Fry; Saskia Millard; Amelia Samuels	29 pts	Italy (ITA); Nadia Battocletti; Angela Mattevi; Ludovica Cavalli	29 pts	France (FRA); Manon Trapp; Flavie Renouard; Ana Egler	38 pts
Mixed relay	Great Britain (GBR); Sarah McDonald; James McMurray; Alexandra Bell; Jonathan Davies (athlete)	17:55	France (FRA); Aurore Fleury; Yani Khelaf; Sandra Beuvière; Alexis Miellet	18:05	Spain (ESP); Solange Andreia Pereira; Sergio Jiménez; Esther Guerrero; Pablo Sánchez Santos	18:11

== Results ==
=== Senior men ===
Individual race
Rank	Athlete	Country	Time (m:s)
1st place, gold medalist(s)	Aras Kaya	Turkey	30:10
2nd place, silver medalist(s)	Yemaneberhan Crippa	Italy	30:21
3rd place, bronze medalist(s)	Julien Wanders	Switzerland	30:25
4	Andrew Butchart	Great Britain	30:38
5	Samuel Fitwi Sibhatu	Germany	30:39
6	Soufiane Bouchikhi	Belgium	30:41
7	Isaac Kimeli	Belgium	30:46
8	Ben Connor	Great Britain	30:47
9	Jonas Raess	Switzerland	30:53
10	Antonio Abadía	Spain	30:57
11	Filip Ingebrigtsen	Norway	30:57
12	Ildar Nadyrov	Authorised Neutral Athletes	30:57
13	Carlos Mayo	Spain	31:05
14	Simon Boch	Germany	31:07
15	Sezgin Ataç	Turkey	31:08
16	Rinas Akhmadiyev	Authorised Neutral Athletes	31:08
17	Seán Tobin	Ireland	31:11
18	Yann Schrub	France	31:12
19	Fernando Carro	Spain	31:17
20	André Pereira	Portugal	31:22
21	Kristian Jones	Great Britain	31:23
22	Lahsene Bouchikhi	Belgium	31:24
23	Michael Somers	Belgium	31:25
24	Didrik Tønseth	Norway	31:25
25	Patrick Dever	Great Britain	31:29
26	Bohdan-Ivan Horodyskyy	Ukraine	31:31
27	Daniel Lundgren	Sweden	31:32
28	Miguel Marques	Portugal	31:32
29	Stan Niesten	Netherlands	31:34
30	Luís Saraiva	Portugal	31:34
31	Ali Kaya	Turkey	31:34
32	Mike Foppen	Netherlands	31:40
33	Ramazan Özdemir	Turkey	31:42
34	Mikael Ekvall	Sweden	31:42
35	Adam Hickey	Great Britain	31:46
36	Azeddine Habz	France	31:47
37	Ivan Strebkov	Ukraine	31:51
38	Andreas Vojta	Austria	31:52
39	Hlynur Andrésson	Iceland	31:56
40	Adhanom Abraha	Sweden	31:58
41	Nekagenet Crippa	Italy	32:00
42	Michele Fontana	Italy	32:03
43	Tom Evans	Great Britain	32:04
44	Yolo Nikolov	Bulgaria	32:16
45	Giuseppe Gerratana	Italy	32:17
46	Ådne Andersen	Norway	32:18
47	Johannes Motschmann	Germany	32:24
48	Said El Otmani	Italy	32:26
49	Dmytro Siruk	Ukraine	32:26
50	Jakob Dybdal Abrahamsen	Denmark	32:27
51	Conor Bradley	Ireland	32:28
52	Hamid Ben Daoud	Spain	32:31
53	Abderrazak Charik	France	32:32
54	Hugo Almeida	Portugal	32:32
55	Rui Teixeira	Portugal	32:39
56	Per Svela	Norway	32:41
57	Dmitrijs Serjogins	Latvia	32:43
58	Thijs Nijhuis	Denmark	32:48
59	Frederik Ernst	Denmark	32:49
60	Eoin Everard	Ireland	32:55
61	Jakub Zemaník	Czech Republic	32:58
62	Jiří Homoláč	Czech Republic	33:00
63	Liam Brady	Ireland	33:01
64	Emmanuel Roudolff	France	33:01
65	Reinis Hartmanis	Latvia	33:14
66	Marcus Rønn	Denmark	33:17
67	Jacob Simonsen	Denmark	33:22
68	Remigijus Kančys	Lithuania	33:25
69	Harvey Dixon	Gibraltar	33:27
70	Damien Landers	Ireland	34:11
71	Karel Hussar	Estonia	34:24
72	Christoph Graf	Switzerland	34:26
73	Charlton Debono	Malta	34:33
74	Cameron Payas	Gibraltar	34:45
75	Edgars Sumskis	Latvia	34:51
76	Bob Bertemes	Luxembourg	34:54
77	Jānis Višķers	Latvia	35:36
78	Carles Gómez Lozano	Andorra	35:53
79	Francesc Carmona Parada	Andorra	36:37
80	Ilir Këllëzi	Albania	37:06
81	Maurice Turnock	Gibraltar	41:20
—	Kevin Maunsell	Ireland	DNF
—	Karl Mäe	Estonia	DNF
—	Arnold Rogers	Gibraltar	DNF
—	Yitayew Abuhay	Israel	DNF
—	Paulo Barbosa	Portugal	DNF
—	Ouassim Oumaiz	Spain	DNF
—	Nassim Hassaous	Spain	DNF
—	Richard Blagg	Gibraltar	DNF
—	Napoleon Solomon	Sweden	DNF
—	Olavi Allase	Estonia	DNF
	Robel Fsiha	Sweden	29:59 DQ

Team race
Rank	Team	Points
1st place, gold medalist(s)	Great Britain; Andrew Butchart; Ben Connor; Kristian Jones; Patrick Never; Adam Hickey; Tom Evans	33 (4+8+21)
2nd place, silver medalist(s)	Belgium; Soufiane Bouchikhi; Isaac Kimeli; Lahsene Bouchikhi; Michael Somers	35 (6+7+22)
3rd place, bronze medalist(s)	Spain; Antonio Abadía; Carlos Mayo; Fernando Carro; Hamid Ben Daoud; Nassim Hassaous; Ouassim Oumaiz	42 (10+13+19)
4	Turkey; Aras Kaya; Sezgin Ataç; Ali Kaya; Ramazan Ozdemir	47 (1+15+31)
5	Germany; Samuel Fitwi Sibhatu; Simon Boch; Johannes Motschmann	66 (5+14+47)
6	Portugal; André Pereira; Miguel Marques; Luís Saraiva; Hugo Almeida; Rui Teixeira; Paulo Barbosa	78 (20+28+30)
7	Norway; Filip Ingebrigtsen; Didrik Tønseth; Ådne Andersen; Per Svela	81 (11+24+46)
8	Switzerland; Julien Wanders; Jonas Raess; Christoph Graf	84 (3+9+72)
9	Italy; Yemaneberhan Crippa; Nekagenet Crippa; Michele Fontana; Giuseppe Gerratana; Said El Otmani	85 (2+41+42)
10	Sweden; Daniel Lundgren; Mikael Ekvall; Adhanom Abraha; Napoleon Solomon	101 (27+34+40)
11	France; Yann Schrub; Azeddine Habz; Abderrazak Charik; Emmanuel Roudolff	107 (18+36+53)
12	Ukraine; Bohdan-Ivan Horodyskyy; Ivan Strebkov; Dmytro Siruk	112 (26+37+49)
13	Ireland; Seán Tobin; Conor Bradley; Eoin Everard; Liam Brady; Damien Landers; Kevin Maunsell	128 (17+51+60)
14	Denmark; Jakob Dybdal Abrahamsen; Thijs Nijhuis; Frederik Ernst; Marcus Rønn; Jacob Simonsen	167 (50+58+59)
15	Latvia; Dmitrijs Serjogins; Reinis Hartmanis; Edgars Sumskis; Jānis Višķers	197 (57+65+75)
16	Gibraltar; Harvey Dixon; Cameron Payas; Maurice Turnock; Arnold Rogers; Richard Blagg	224 (69+74+81)
	Estonia; Karel Hussar; Karl Mäe; Olavi Allase	NM

=== Senior women ===
Individual race
Rank	Athlete	Country	Time (m:s)
1st place, gold medalist(s)	Yasemin Can	Turkey	26:52
2nd place, silver medalist(s)	Karoline Bjerkeli Grøvdal	Norway	27:07
3rd place, bronze medalist(s)	Samrawit Mengsteab	Sweden	27:43
4	Fionnuala McCormack	Ireland	27:45
5	Liv Westphal	France	28:02
6	Jessica Judd	Great Britain	28:05
7	Charlotte Arter	Great Britain	28:07
8	Ana Dulce Félix	Portugal	28:09
9	Elena Burkard	Germany	28:10
10	Carla Salomé Rocha	Portugal	28:13
11	Valeria Roffino	Italy	28:34
12	Federica Sugamiele	Italy	28:36
13	Abbie Donnelly	Great Britain	28:40
14	Esma Aydemir	Turkey	28:43
15	Amy Griffiths	Great Britain	28:50
16	Irene Sánchez-Escribano	Spain	28:50
17	Aoibhe Richardson	Ireland	28:52
18	Maria Sagnes Wågan	Norway	28:54
19	Roxana Bârcă	Romania	28:54
20	Ciara Mageean	Ireland	28:58
21	Sophie Duarte	France	29:01
22	Julia Mayer	Austria	29:01
23	Deborah Schöneborn	Germany	29:02
24	Claudia Prisecaru	Romania	29:07
25	Susana Francisco	Portugal	29:08
26	Domenika Mayer	Germany	29:10
27	Ana Lozano	Spain	29:16
28	Darya Mykhaylova	Ukraine	29:18
29	Jennifer Nesbitt	Great Britain	29:18
30	Kate Avery	Great Britain	29:23
31	Azucena Díaz	Spain	29:27
32	Nicole Egger	Switzerland	29:34
33	Rebecca Lonedo	Italy	29:36
34	María José Pérez	Spain	29:42
35	Mary Mulhare	Ireland	29:44
36	Aurore Guerin	France	29:48
37	Una Britton	Ireland	29:59
38	Remziye Erman	Turkey	30:10
39	Moira Stewartová	Czech Republic	30:14
40	Aude Korotchansky	France	30:14
41	Martina Merlo	Italy	30:17
42	Viktoriya Khapilina	Ukraine	30:19
43	Cristina Espejo	Spain	30:30
44	Vera Hoffmann	Luxembourg	30:34
45	Iryna Bubnyak	Ukraine	30:38
46	Rea Iseli	Switzerland	30:46
47	Fionnuala Ross	Ireland	30:50
48	Line Brandt Pedersen	Denmark	31:12
49	Elefthería Petrouláki	Greece	31:32
50	Adelina Paulina Baltoi	Romania	32:07
51	Karen Ehrenreich	Denmark	32:19
52	Johanna Ardel	Estonia	33:19
53	Lisa Marie Bezzina	Malta	34:25
—	Meryem Akdağ	Turkey	DNF
—	Chiara Scherrer	Switzerland	DNF
—	Silvia Oggioni	Italy	DNF
—	Teresa Urbina	Spain	DNF
—	Simone Christensen Glad	Denmark	DNF
—	Julia Milena Augsburger	Romania	DNF

Team race
Rank	Team	Points
1st place, gold medalist(s)	Great Britain; Jessica Judd; Charlotte Arter; Abbie Donnelly; Amy Griffiths; Jennifer Nesbitt; Kate Avery	26 (6+7+13)
2nd place, silver medalist(s)	Ireland; Fionnuala McCormack; Aoibhe Richardson; Ciara Mageean; Mary Mulhare; Una Britton; Fionnuala Ross	41 (4+17+20)
3rd place, bronze medalist(s)	Portugal; Ana Dulce Félix; Carla Salomé Rocha; Susana Francisco	43 (8+10+25)
4	Turkey; Yasemin Can; Esma Aydemir; Remziye Erman; Meryem Akdağ	53 (1+14+38)
5	Italy; Valeria Roffino; Federica Sugamiele; Rebecca Lonedo; Martina Merlo; Silvia Oggioni	56 (11+12+33)
6	Germany; Elena Burkard; Deborah Schöneborn; Domenika Mayer	58 (9+23+26)
7	France; Liv Westphal; Sophie Duarte; Aurore Guerin; Aude Korotchansky	62 (5+21+36)
8	Spain; Irene Sánchez-Escribano; Ana Lozano; Azucena Díaz; María José Pérez; Cristina Espejo; Teresa Urbina	74 (16+27+31)
9	Romania; Roxana Bârcă; Claudia Prisecaru; Adelina Paulina Baltoi; Julia Milena Augsburger	93 (19+24+50)
10	Ukraine; Darya Mykhaylova; Viktoriya Khapilina; Iryna Bubnyak	115 (28+42+45)
	Switzerland; Nicole Egger; Rea Iseli; Chiara Scherrer	NM
	Denmark; Line Brandt Pedersen; Karen Ehrenreich; Simone Christensen Glad	NM

=== Senior mixed relay ===
Rank	Team	Time (m:s)
1st place, gold medalist(s)	United Kingdom; Sarah McDonald, James McMurray, Alexandra Bell; Jonathan Davies (athlete)	17:55
2nd place, silver medalist(s)	France; Aurore Fleury, Yani Khelaf, Sandra Beuvière, Alexis Miellet	18:05
3rd place, bronze medalist(s)	Spain; Solange Andreia Pereira, Sergio Jiménez, Esther Guerrero, Pablo Sánchez Santos	18:11
4	Belgium; Vanessa Scaunet, Robin Hendrix, Camille Muls, Eliott Crestan	18:19
5	Portugal; Salomé Afonso, Paulo Rosário, Patricia Silva, Luís Monteiro	18:29
6	Ireland; Nadia Power, John Travers, Amy O'Donoghue, Eoin Pierce	18:40
7	Sweden; Linn Nilsson, Andreas Kramer, Lovisa Lindh, Robin Rohlén	18:45
8	Lithuania; Eglė Balčiūnaitė, Benediktas Mickus, Loreta Kančytė, Simas Bertašius	18:47
9	Italy; Elisa Bortoli, Mohamed Zerrad, Joyce Mattagliano, Soufiane El Kabbouri	18:54
10	Ukraine; Valentyna Kilyarska, Oleh Kayafa, Olesya Didovodyuk, Yuriy Kishchenko	19:14
11	Latvia; Agata Strausa, Janis Razgalis, Līga Velvere, Uģis Jocis	19:20
	Belarus; Katsiaryna Karneyenka, Artsiom Kalachou, Volha Nemahai, Siarhei Platonau	DQ

=== U23 men ===
Individual race
Rank	Athlete	Country	Time (m:s)
1st place, gold medalist(s)	Jimmy Gressier	France	24:17
2nd place, silver medalist(s)	Elzan Bibić	Serbia	24:25
3rd place, bronze medalist(s)	Abdessamad Oukhelfen	Spain	24:34
4	Tadesse Getahon	Israel	24:50
5	Yohanes Chiappinelli	Italy	24:51
6	Fabien Palcau	France	24:52
7	Jacopo De Marchi	Italy	24:55
8	Mahamed Mahamed	Great Britain	24:56
9	Oussama Lonneux	Belgium	24:57
10	Mohamed-Amine El Bouajaji	France	24:57
11	Suldan Hassan	Sweden	24:58
12	Alexander Yee	Great Britain	24:59
13	Ignacio Fontes	Spain	25:01
14	Davor Aaron Bienenfeld	Germany	25:02
15	Markus Görger	Germany	25:03
16	Mohamed Mohumed	Germany	25:04
17	Sebastiano Parolini	Italy	25:11
18	Hugo Hay	France	25:15
19	Narve Gilje Nordås	Norway	25:15
20	Pierrik Jocteur-Monrozier	France	25:19
21	Guillaume Grimard	Belgium	25:21
22	Brian Fay	Ireland	25:25
23	Marek Chrascina	Czech Republic	25:26
24	John Heymans	Belgium	25:30
25	Jack O'Leary	Ireland	25:31
26	Peter Lynch	Ireland	25:31
27	Viktor Šinágl	Czech Republic	25:31
28	Anton Hrabovskyy	Ukraine	25:32
29	Sol Sweeney	Great Britain	25:32
30	Riccardo Mugnosso	Italy	25:36
31	Pasquale Selvarolo	Italy	25:39
32	Simen Halle Haugen	Norway	25:41
33	Emil Danielsson	Sweden	25:43
34	Tariku Novales	Spain	25:46
35	Damián Vích	Czech Republic	25:48
36	Vadym Lonskyy	Ukraine	25:52
37	Mários Anagnóstou	Greece	25:52
38	Alexandre Figueiredo	Portugal	25:53
39	Getu Admasu	Israel	25:54
40	Louis Gilavert	France	25:55
41	Adrian Garcea	Romania	25:55
42	Ahmet Alkanoğlu	Turkey	25:56
43	Nils Voigt	Germany	25:57
44	Artem Alfimov	Ukraine	25:58
45	Sebastian Nilsson	Sweden	26:00
46	Nahuel Carabaña	Andorra	26:03
47	Godadaw Belachew	Israel	26:03
48	Bukayaw Malede	Israel	26:04
49	Cormac Dalton	Ireland	26:05
50	Clement Deflandre	Belgium	26:06
51	Simon Sundström	Sweden	26:07
52	Dorin Andrei Rusu	Romania	26:12
53	Ricardo Ferreira	Portugal	26:12
54	Eshetu Worku	Israel	26:19
55	Jannik Seelhöfer	Germany	26:19
56	Euan Makepeace	Great Britain	26:21
57	Jorge Moreira	Portugal	26:26
58	Dariusz Boratyński	Poland	26:26
59	Lucas Da Silva	Belgium	26:28
60	Emile Cairess	Great Britain	26:34
61	Sergiy Polikarpenko	Italy	26:37
62	Antti Ihamäki	Finland	26:42
63	Filip Svalina	Croatia	26:43
64	Sergio Alegre	Spain	26:47
65	Hüseyin Can	Turkey	26:48
66	Artūrs Niklāvs Medveds	Latvia	26:49
67	Dario Ivanovski	North Macedonia	26:50
68	Isaac Nader	Portugal	26:57
69	Cristiano Borges	Portugal	27:06
70	Kenan Sarı	Turkey	27:07
71	Cathal Doyle	Ireland	27:07
72	David McGlynn	Ireland	27:13
73	Mihai Cochior	Romania	27:18
74	Said Mechaal	Spain	27:21
75	Tobias Rattinger	Austria	27:27
76	Filipe Vitorino	Portugal	27:34
77	Hamza Ardjoun	Spain	27:40
78	Fredrik Sandvik	Norway	27:47
79	Bjarne Kölle	Switzerland	27:50
80	Marius Sorin Turcu	Romania	27:54
81	Dillon Cassar	Malta	27:58
—	Viachaslau Skudny	Belarus	DNF
—	Laviniu Madalin Chis	Romania	DNF
—	John Millar	Great Britain	DNF
—	Andrejs Bānis	Latvia	DNF

Team race
Rank	Team	Points
1st place, gold medalist(s)	France; Jimmy Gressier; Fabien Palcau; Mohamed-Aminen El Bouajaji; Hugo Hay; Pierrik Jocteur-Monrozier; Louis Gilavert	17 (1+6+10)
2nd place, silver medalist(s)	Italy; Yohanes Chiappinelli; Jacopo De Marchi; Sebastiano Parolini; Riccardo Mugnosso; Pasquale Selvarolo; Sergiy Polikarpenko	29 (5+7+17)
3rd place, bronze medalist(s)	Germany; Davor Aaron Bienenfeld; Markus Görger; Mohamed Mohumed; Nils Voigt; Jannik Seelhöfer	45 (14+15+16)
4	Great Britain; Mahamed Mahamed; Alexander Yee; Sol Sweeney; Euan Makepeace; Emile Cairess; John Millar	49 (8+12+29)
5	Spain; Abdessamad Oukhelfen; Ignacio Fontes; Tariku Novales; Sergio Alegre; Said Mechaal; Hamza Ardjoun	50 (3+13+34)
6	Belgium; Oussama Lonneux; Guillaume Grimard; John Heymans; Clement Deflandre; Lucas Da Silva	54 (9+21+24)
7	Ireland; Brian Fay; Jack O'Leary; Peter Lynch; Cormac Dalton; Cathal Doyle; David McGlynn	73 (22+25+26)
8	Czech Republic; Marek Chrascina; Viktor Šinágl; Damián Vích	85 (23+27+35)
9	Sweden; Suldan Hassan; Emil Danielsson; Sebastian Nilsson; Simon Sundström	89 (11+33+45)
10	Israel; Tadesse Getahon; Getu Admasu; Godadaw Belachew; Bukayaw Malede; Eshetu Worku	90 (4+39+47)
11	Ukraine; Anton Hrabovskyy; Vadym Lonskyy; Artem Alfimov	108 (28+36+44)
12	Norway; Narve Gilje Nordås; Simen Halle Haugen; Fredrik Sandvik	129 (19+32+78)
13	Portugal; Alexandre Figueiredo; Ricardo Ferreira; Jorge Moreira; Isaac Nader; Cristiano Borges; Filipe Vitorino	148 (38+53+57)
14	Romania; Adrian Garcea; Dorin Andrei Rusu; Mihai Cochior; Marius Sorin Turcu; Laviniu Madalin Chis	166 (41+52+73)
15	Turkey; Ahmet Alkanoğlu; Hüseyin Can; Kenan Sarı	177 (42+65+70)

=== U23 women ===
Individual race
Rank	Athlete	Country	Time (m:s)
1st place, gold medalist(s)	Anna Emilie Møller	Denmark	20:30
2nd place, silver medalist(s)	Jasmijn Lau	Netherlands	21:09
3rd place, bronze medalist(s)	Stephanie Cotter	Ireland	21:15
4	Jasmijn Bakker	Netherlands	21:21
5	Federica Zanne	Italy	21:24
6	Aneta Chlebiková	Czech Republic	21:25
7	Bronwen Owen	Great Britain	21:35
8	Lisa Tertsch	Germany	21:41
9	Eilish Flanagan	Ireland	21:47
10	Cristina Ruiz	Spain	21:51
11	Diane van Es	Netherlands	21:53
12	Lea Meyer	Germany	21:53
13	Anna Tropina	Authorised Neutral Athletes	21:54
14	Bohdana Semyonova	Ukraine	21:56
15	Amelia Quirk	Great Britain	21:57
16	Sara Christiansson	Sweden	22:04
17	Roisin Flanagan	Ireland	22:06
18	Poppy Tank	Great Britain	22:07
19	Bahar Yıldırım	Turkey	22:12
20	Egle Morenaite	Lithuania	22:14
21	Isabel Barreiro	Spain	22:19
22	Laia Casajoana	Spain	22:19
23	Mathilde Sénéchal	France	22:20
24	Julie Lejarraga	France	22:20
25	Sümeyye Erol	Turkey	22:21
26	Manuela Martins	Portugal	22:23
27	Sarah Kistner	Germany	22:25
28	Joana Ferreira	Portugal	22:26
29	Leila Hadji	France	22:26
30	Uxía Pérez	Spain	22:27
31	Hannah Nuttall	Great Britain	22:28
32	Lilia Martins	Portugal	22:36
33	Eleanor Bolton	Great Britain	22:36
34	Laura Luengo	Spain	22:40
35	Meline Rollin	France	22:43
36	Lena Millonig	Austria	22:44
37	Gaia Colli	Italy	22:47
38	Fian Sweeney	Ireland	22:52
39	Burcu Subatan	Turkey	22:53
40	Marine Houel	France	22:57
41	Leah Hanle	Germany	22:58
42	Viktoriia Shkurko	Ukraine	23:06
43	Micol Majori	Italy	23:10
44	Beatriz Rodrigues	Portugal	23:14
45	Yaroslava Yastreb	Ukraine	23:15
46	Emeline Delanis	France	23:16
47	Claire Fagan	Ireland	23:16
48	Sara Monteiro	Portugal	23:21
49	Katharina Pesendorfer	Austria	23:29
50	Laura Swannet	Belgium	23:29
51	Kamilė Vaidžiulytė	Lithuania	23:41
52	Katarina Vukančić	Croatia	23:46
53	Auksė Linkutė	Lithuania	24:08
54	Sara Duarte	Portugal	24:10
55	Damla Çelik	Turkey	24:13
56	Betül Gülengül	Turkey	24:41
57	Sorcha McAllister	Ireland	24:55
58	Gintarė Juknytė	Lithuania	25:14
—	Célia Antón	Spain	DNF
—	Cari Hughes	Great Britain	DNF
—	Famke Heinst	Netherlands	DNF
—	Miriam Dattke	Germany	DNS

Team race
Rank	Team	Points
1st place, gold medalist(s)	Netherlands; Jasmijn Lau; Jasmijn Bakker; Diane van Es; Famke Heinst	17 (2+4+11)
2nd place, silver medalist(s)	Ireland; Stephanie Cotter; Eilish Flanagan; Roisin Flanagan; Fian Sweeney; Claire Fagan; Sorcha McAllister	29 (3+9+17)
3rd place, bronze medalist(s)	Great Britain; Bronwen Owen; Amelia Quirk; Poppy Tank; Hannah Nuttall; Eleanor Bolton; Cari Hughes	40 (7+15+18)
4	Germany; Lisa Tertsch; Lea Meyer; Sarah Kistner; Leah Hanle; Miriam Dattke	47 (8+12+27)
5	Spain; Cristina Ruiz; Isabel Barreiro; Laia Casajoana; Uxía Pérez; Laura Luengo; Célia Antón	53 (10+21+22)
6	France; Mathilde Sénéchal; Julie Lejarraga; Leila Hadji; Meline Rollin; Marine Houel; Emeline Delanis	76 (23+24+29)
7	Turkey; Bahar Yıldırım; Sümeyye Erol; Burcu Subatan; Damla Çelik; Betül Gülengül	83 (19+25+39)
8	Italy; Federica Zanne; Gaia Colli; Micol Majori	85 (5+37+43)
9	Portugal; Manuela Martins; Joana Ferreira; Lilia Martins; Beatriz Rodrigues; Sara Monteiro; Sara Duarte	86 (26+28+32)
10	Ukraine; Bohdana Semyonova; Viktoriia Shkurko; Yaroslava Yastreb	101 (14+42+45)
11	Lithuania; Egle Morenaite; Kamilė Vaidžiulytė; Auksė Linkutė; Gintarė Juknytė	124 (20+51+53)

=== U20 men ===
Individual race
Rank	Athlete	Country	Time (m:s)
1st place, gold medalist(s)	Jakob Ingebrigtsen	Norway	18:20
2nd place, silver medalist(s)	Ayetullah Aslanhan	Turkey	18:58
3rd place, bronze medalist(s)	Efrem Gidey	Ireland	19:01
4	Etson Barros	Portugal	19:05
5	Charles Hicks	Great Britain	19:05
6	Dereje Chekole	Israel	19:05
7	Omar Nuur	Sweden	19:18
8	Håkon Stavik	Norway	19:18
9	Matthew Willis	Great Britain	19:19
10	Flavien Szot	France	19:20
11	Zakariya Mahamed	Great Britain	19:20
12	Darragh McElhinney	Ireland	19:21
13	Pol Oriach	Spain	19:23
14	Duarte Gomes	Portugal	19:23
15	István Palkovits	Hungary	19:24
16	Joel Ibler Lillesø	Denmark	19:24
17	Anton Østdal	Denmark	19:25
18	Valentin Bresc	France	19:26
19	Luca Alfieri	Italy	19:27
20	Baptiste Guyon	France	19:27
21	Miguel Moreira	Portugal	19:29
22	Will Barnicoat	Great Britain	19:30
23	Arthur Gervais	France	19:32
24	Thomas McStay	Ireland	19:32
25	Elias Schreml	Germany	19:33
26	Keelan Kilrehill	Ireland	19:33
27	Illian Martens	Netherlands	19:33
28	Jamie Battle	Ireland	19:34
29	Ibrahim Buras	Norway	19:35
30	Alejandro Quijada	Spain	19:36
31	Hamish Armitt	Great Britain	19:37
32	Mikołaj Czeronek	Poland	19:37
33	Mika Kotiranta	Finland	19:38
34	Marco Zoldan	Italy	19:40
35	Adisu Guadia	Israel	19:40
36	Ward Leunckens	Belgium	19:40
37	Emil Millán de la Oliva	Sweden	19:41
38	Marco Fontana Granotto	Italy	19:42
39	Derebe Ayele	Israel	19:43
40	Magnus Tuv Myhre	Norway	19:43
41	Florian Bremm	Germany	19:44
42	Simon Meganck	Belgium	19:44
43	Tim Verbaandert	Netherlands	19:47
44	Rúben Amaral	Portugal	19:51
45	Dominik Müller	Germany	19:52
46	Omar Ismail	Sweden	19:52
47	Jonatan Andersen Vedvik	Norway	19:53
48	Tim Van De Velde	Belgium	19:58
49	Artyom Popov	Authorised Neutral Athletes	19:58
50	Assaf Harari	Israel	19:59
51	Enrico Vecchi	Italy	20:00
52	Hicham Serroukh	Spain	20:02
53	René Sasyn	Czech Republic	20:02
54	Giedrius Valinčius	Lithuania	20:02
55	Degu Abebe	Israel	20:02
56	Miguel Baidal	Spain	20:05
57	Jan Pešava	Czech Republic	20:05
58	Ruben Verheyden	Belgium	20:05
59	Levente Szemerei	Hungary	20:07
60	Jonathan Hofer	Switzerland	20:08
61	Ryan Oosting	Netherlands	20:09
62	Miguel Ribeiro	Portugal	20:10
63	Zemenu Muchie	Israel	20:12
64	Leevi Keronen	Finland	20:13
65	Paul Specht	Germany	20:13
66	Andriy Krakovetskyy	Ukraine	20:16
67	Robert Telpt	Estonia	20:17
68	Job Ijtsma	Netherlands	20:18
69	Oleksandr Chornobryvyi	Ukraine	20:19
70	Francesco Guerra	Italy	20:20
71	Rojs Puks	Latvia	20:24
72	Matthew Stonier	Great Britain	20:24
73	Maurice Christen	Switzerland	20:25
74	Adam Maijo	Spain	20:25
75	David Šlapák	Czech Republic	20:25
76	Shay McEvoy	Ireland	20:26
77	Oskari Kangasniemi	Finland	20:26
78	Paul Feuerer	Germany	20:28
79	Vasyl Sabunyak	Ukraine	20:29
80	Andreas Bock Bjørnsen	Denmark	20:33
81	Ahmet Mutlu	Turkey	20:37
82	Hugo de Miguel	Spain	20:37
83	Tim Thull	Luxembourg	20:37
84	Łukasz Górski	Poland	20:41
85	Muhammet Can Çatal	Turkey	20:44
86	Etienne Daguinos	France	20:46
87	Yassin Choury	Italy	20:46
88	Erik Jälknäs	Sweden	20:47
89	Szymon Skalski	Poland	20:57
90	Gil Weicherding	Luxembourg	20:59
91	Martin Kováčech	Czech Republic	21:03
92	Ebbe Møller	Denmark	21:06
93	Łukasz Jatczak	Poland	21:29
94	Santis Setkovskis	Latvia	21:36
95	Tarık Demir	Turkey	21:48
96	Karlo Ciban	Croatia	22:00
97	Arsenijs Kadiševs	Latvia	22:02
98	Abdullah Ahammad	Gibraltar	23:22
99	Edgars Pastors	Latvia	23:43
—	Markus Kirk Kjeldsen	Denmark	DNS
—	Pierre Bordeau	France	DNS
—	Aleksander Wiącek	Poland	DNF
—	Julien Stalhandske	Switzerland	DNF
—	Jeppe Risvig	Denmark	DNF
—	Matija Rizmal	Slovenia	DNF
—	Sebastian Frey	Austria	DNF
—	Nuno Pereira	Portugal	DNF
—	Leon Berthold	Switzerland	DNF

Team race
Rank	Team	Points
1st place, gold medalist(s)	Great Britain; Charles Hicks; Mathew Willis; Zakariya Mamamed; Will Barnicoat; Hamish Armitt; Matthew Stoner	25 (5+9+11)
2nd place, silver medalist(s)	Norway; Jakob Ingebrigtsen; Håkon Stavik; Ibrahim Buras; Magnus Tuv Myhre; Jonatan Vedvik	38 (1+8+29)
3rd place, bronze medalist(s)	Portugal; Etson Barros; Duarte Gomes; Miguel Moreira; Ruben Amaral; Miguel Ribiero	39 (4+14+21)
4	Ireland; Efrem Gidey; Darragh McElhinney; Thomas McStay; Keelan Kilrehill; Jamie Battle; Shay McEvoy	39 (3+12+24)
5	France; Flavien Szot; Valentin Bresc; Baptiste Guyon; Arthur Gervais; Etienne Daguinos; Pierre Bordeau	48 (10+18+20)
6	Israel; Dereje Chekole; Adisu Guadia; Derebe Ayele; Assaf Harari; Degu Abebe; Zemenu Muchie	80 (6+35+39)
7	Sweden; Omar Nuur; Emil Millán de la Oliva; Omar Ismail; Erik Jälknäs	90 (7+37+46)
8	Italy; Luca Alfieri; Marco Zoldan; Marco Fontana Granotto; Enrico Vecchi; Francesco Guerra; Yassin Choury	91 (19+34+38)
9	Spain; Pol Oriach; Alejandro Quijada; Hicham Serroukh; Miguel Baidal; Adam Maijo; Hugo de Miguel	95 (13+30+52)
10	Germany; Elias Schreml; Florian Bremm; Dominik Müller; Paul Specht; Paul Feuerer	111 (25+41+45)
11	Denmark; Joel Ibler Lillesø; Anton Østdal; Andreas Bock Bjørnsen; Ebbe Møller; Markus Kirk Kjeldsen; Jeppe Risvig	113 (16+17+80)
12	Belgium; Ward Leunckens; Simon Meganck; Tim Van De Velde; Ruben Verheyden	126 (36+42+48)
13	Netherlands; Illian Martens; Tim Verbaandert; Ryan Oosting; Job Ijtsma	131 (27+43+61)
14	Turkey; Ayetullah Aslanhan; Ahmet Mutlu; Muhammet Can Çatal; Tarık Demir	168 (2+81+85)
15	Finland; Mika Kotiranta; Leevi Keronen; Oskari Kangasniemi	174 (33+64+77)
16	Czech Republic; René Sasyn; Jan Pešava; David Šlapák; Martin Kováčech	185 (53+57+75)
17	Poland; Mikołaj Czeronek; Łukasz Górski; Szymon Skalski; Łukasz Jatczak; Aleksander Wiącek	205 (32+84+89)
18	Ukraine; Andriy Krakovetskyy; Oleksandr Chornobryvyi; Vasyl Sabunyak	214 (66+69+79)
19	Latvia; Rojs Puks; Santis Setkovskis; Arsenijs Kadiševs; Edgars Pastors	262 (71+94+97)
	Switzerland; Jonathan Hofer; Maurice Christen; Julien Stalhandske; Leon Berthold	NM (60+73)

=== U20 women ===
Individual race
Rank	Athlete	Country	Time (m:s)
1st place, gold medalist(s)	Nadia Battocletti	Italy	13:58
2nd place, silver medalist(s)	Klara Lukan	Slovenia	14:01
3rd place, bronze medalist(s)	Mariana Machado	Portugal	14:10
4	Delia Sclabas	Switzerland	14:22
5	Zofia Dudek	Poland	14:22
6	Izzy Fry	Great Britain	14:33
7	Gréta Varga	Hungary	14:34
8	Sibylle Häring	Switzerland	14:35
9	Manon Trapp	France	14:37
10	Flavie Renouard	France	14:37
11	Saskia Millard	Great Britain	14:37
12	Amelia Samuels	Great Britain	14:41
13	Angela Mattevi	Italy	14:42
14	Laura Valgreen Petersen	Denmark	14:50
15	Ludovica Cavalli	Italy	14:51
16	Carla Arce Pereira	Spain	14:51
17	Cera Gemmell	Great Britain	14:53
18	Lia Lemos	Portugal	14:57
19	Ana Egler	France	15:01
20	Josina Papenfuß	Germany	15:01
21	Berenice Fulchiron	France	15:02
22	Oliwia Sarnecka	Poland	15:02
23	Paula Schneiders	Germany	15:02
24	Emilie Renaud	France	15:03
25	Nathalie Blomqvist	Finland	15:04
26	Antje Pfüller	Germany	15:06
27	Megan Keith	Great Britain	15:06
28	Febe Triest	Belgium	15:07
29	Anneke Vortmeier	Germany	15:08
30	Angela Viciosa	Spain	15:09
31	Claire Palou	France	15:12
32	Anna Arnaudo	Italy	15:12
33	Carina Reicht	Austria	15:12
34	Barbara Neiva	Portugal	15:14
35	Ina Novik	Belarus	15:15
36	Livia Wespe	Switzerland	15:16
37	Natalia Bielak	Poland	15:16
38	Blanka Dörfel	Germany	15:16
39	Adéla Koláčková	Czech Republic	15:16
40	Greta Karinauskaitė	Lithuania	15:17
41	Líza Hazuchová	Slovakia	15:18
42	Giada Licandro	Italy	15:20
43	Kseniya Kuznetsova	Authorised Neutral Athletes	15:20
44	Helen Pacurariu-Nagy	Romania	15:21
45	Olivia Mason	Great Britain	15:27
46	Jodie McCann	Ireland	15:28
47	Pinja Kotinurmi	Finland	15:29
48	Sıla Ergün	Turkey	15:30
49	Laura Pellicoro	Italy	15:30
50	Camila Gomes	Portugal	15:30
51	Paula Rakijašić	Croatia	15:32
52	Valentina Rosamilia	Switzerland	15:32
53	Alina Sönning	Switzerland	15:32
54	Emilia Mikszuta	Poland	15:35
55	Olimpia Breza	Poland	15:37
56	Maria Forero	Spain	15:38
57	Janette Vänttinen	Finland	15:38
58	Hatice Yıldırım	Turkey	15:40
59	Mónica Silva	Portugal	15:41
60	Maite Gonzalez	Spain	15:44
61	Irina Shipitsyna	Authorised Neutral Athletes	15:47
62	Aoife O'Cuill	Ireland	15:48
63	Andrea Romero	Spain	15:50
64	Klaudia Kazimierska	Poland	15:53
65	Ivanna Kukh	Ukraine	15:54
66	Catia Pereira	Portugal	15:56
67	Madalina Elena Sirbu	Romania	15:56
68	Leonie Saurer	Switzerland	15:56
69	Elena Duškova	Slovakia	16:02
70	Elia Saura	Spain	16:02
71	Mie Gam	Denmark	16:02
72	Klara Hansen	Denmark	16:04
73	Sophie Søefeldt	Denmark	16:05
74	Lotte Luise Seiler	Austria	16:06
75	Laura Astrup	Denmark	16:07
76	Kateryna Onisimova	Ukraine	16:08
77	Sarah Kelly	Ireland	16:10
78	Angela Veronica Olenici	Romania	16:15
79	Dominyka Petraškaitė	Lithuania	16:16
80	Elitsa Todorova	Bulgaria	16:16
81	Katharina Götschl	Austria	16:20
82	Heljä-Viivi Unkila	Finland	16:20
83	Tamara Severianova	Ukraine	16:23
84	Danielle Donegan	Ireland	16:24
85	Eimear Maher	Ireland	16:30
86	Elif Şura Özdemir	Turkey	16:31
87	Ayşe Ecer	Turkey	16:35
88	Katrine Risvig	Denmark	16:38
89	Margaux Bruls	Luxembourg	16:50
90	Marija Jekabsone	Lithuania	16:54
91	Anna Marija Petrakova	Latvia	17:16
92	Georgiana Spiridon	Romania	17:29
93	Maeve Gallagher	Ireland	18:08

Team race
Rank	Team	Points
1st place, gold medalist(s)	Great Britain; Izzy Fry; Saskia Millard; Amelia Samuels; Cera Gemmell; Megan Keith; Olivia Mason	29 (6+11+12)
2nd place, silver medalist(s)	Italy; Nadia Battocletti; Angela Mattevi; Kudovica Cavalli; Anna Arnaudo; Giada Lisandro; Laura Pellicoro	29 (1+13+14)
3rd place, bronze medalist(s)	France; Manon Trapp; Flavie Renouard; Ana Egler; Berenice Fulchiron; Emilie Renaud; Claire Palou	38 (9+10+19)
4	Switzerland; Delia Sclabas; Sibylle Häring; Livia Wespe; Valentina Rosmilia; Alina Sonning; Leonie Saurer	48 (4+8+36)
5	Portugal; Mariana Machado; Lia Lemos; Barbara Neiva; Camila Gomes; Mónica Silva; Catia Pereira	55 (3+18+34)
6	Poland; Zofia Dudek; Oliwia Sarnecka; Natalia Bielak; Emilia Mikszuta; Olimpia Breza; Klaudia Kazimierska	64 (5+22+37)
7	Germany; Josina Papenfuß; Paula Schneiders; Antje Pfüller; Anneke Vortmeier; Blanka Dörfel	69 (20+23+26)
8	Spain; Carla Arce Pereira; Angela Viciosa; Maria Forero; Maite Gonzalez; Andrea Romero; Elia Saura	102 (16+30+56)
9	Finland; Nathalie Blomqvist; Pinja Kotinurmi; Janette Vänttinen; Heljä-Viivi Unkila	129 (25+47+57)
10	Denmark; Laura Valgreen Petersen; Mie Gam; Klara Hansen; Sophie Søefeldt; Laura Astrup; Katrine Risvig	157 (14+71+72)
11	Ireland; Jodie McCann; Aoife O'Cuill; Sarah Kelly; Danielle Donegan; Eimear Maher; Maeve Gallagher	185 (46+62+77)
12	Austria; Carina Reicht; Lotte Luise Seiler; Katharina Götschl	188 (33+74+81)
13	Romania; Helen Pacurariu-Nagy; Madalina Elena Sirbu; Angela Veronica Olenici; Georgiana Spiridon	189 (44+67+78)
14	Turkey; Sıla Ergün; Hatice Yıldırım; Elif Şura Özdemir; Ayşe Ecer	192 (48+58+86)
15	Lithuania; Greta Karinauskaitė; Dominyka Petraškaitė; Marija Jekabsone	209 (40+79+90)
16	Ukraine; Ivanna Kukh; Kateryna Onisimova; Tamara Severianova	224 (65+76+83)
