= 2018 IAAF World U20 Championships – Women's 1500 metres =

Event on the 2018 IAAF World U20 Championship

Women's 1500 metres at the 2018 World U20 Championships
- Venue: Ratina Stadium
- Dates: 12 and 15 July
- Competitors: 30 from 21 nations
- Winning time: 4:09.67

Medalists
gold medal	Alemaz Samuel	Ethiopia
silver medal	Miriam Cherop	Kenya
bronze medal	Delia Sclabas	Switzerland

The women's 1500 metres at the 2018 IAAF World U20 Championships was held at Ratina Stadium on 12 and 15 July.

== Records ==
Standing records prior to the 2018 IAAF World U20 Championships
World U20 Record	Lang Yinglai (CHN)	3:51.34	Shanghai, China	18 October 1997
Championship Record	Faith Kipyegon (KEN)	4:04.96	Barcelona, Spain	15 July 2012
World U20 Leading	Alemaz Teshale (ETH)	4:01.78	Doha, Qatar	4 May 2018

== Results ==
=== Heats ===
Qualification: First 4 of each heat (Q) and the 4 fastest times (q) qualified for the final.

Rank	Heat	Name	Nationality	Time	Note
1	2	Dinke Firdisa	Ethiopia	4:16.85	Q
2	2	Edina Jebitok	Kenya	4:17.07	Q
3	2	Katrina Robinson	New Zealand	4:17.93	Q
4	2	Delia Sclabas	Switzerland	4:18.01	Q
5	2	Jocelyn Chau	Canada	4:18.29	q
6	2	Caitlyn Collier	United States	4:18.40	q, PB
7	2	Francesca Brint	Great Britain	4:18.58	q, PB
8	1	Alemaz Samuel	Ethiopia	4:18.88	Q
9	2	Ririka Hironaka	Japan	4:19.03	q
10	1	Miriam Cherop	Kenya	4:19.05	Q
11	1	Erin Wallace	Great Britain	4:21.60	Q
12	1	Mariana Machado	Portugal	4:21.68	Q
13	1	Gaia Sabbatini	Italy	4:22.50	
14	2	Elisa Palmero	Italy	4:23.06	PB
15	1	Taryn O'Neill	Canada	4:23.38	
16	2	Patrícia Silva	Portugal	4:24.57	
17	2	Abbey Caldwell	Australia	4:24.65	
18	1	Sarah Eckel	Australia	4:24.90	
19	1	Klara Lukan	Slovenia	4:26.43	
20	1	Meryeme Azrour	Morocco	4:26.43	
21	2	Sophie Søefeldt	Denmark	4:26.70	
22	1	Anna Mark Helwigh	Denmark	4:26.84	
23	1	Rachel McArthur	United States	4:28.72	
24	1	Lena Kieffer	Luxembourg	4:28.84	
25	2	Mathilde Deswaef	Belgium	4:30.31	
26	1	Viktoriya Kovba	Ukraine	4:30.38	
27	1	Águeda Muñoz	Spain	4:30.63	
28	1	Belinda Chemutai	Uganda	4:35.51	
	2	Durga Pramod Deore	India	DNF	
	2	Silviya Georgieva	Bulgaria	DNS	

=== Final ===
Rank	Name	Nationality	Time	Note
1st place, gold medalist(s)	Alemaz Samuel	Ethiopia	4:09.67	
2nd place, silver medalist(s)	Miriam Cherop	Kenya	4:10.73	
3rd place, bronze medalist(s)	Delia Sclabas	Switzerland	4:11.98	
4	Mariana Machado	Portugal	4:14.93	
5	Edina Jebitok	Kenya	4:15.17	
6	Dinke Firdisa	Ethiopia	4:17.42	
7	Erin Wallace	Great Britain	4:17.61	
8	Katrina Robinson	New Zealand	4:18.53	
9	Jocelyn Chau	Canada	4:18.56	
10	Francesca Brint	Great Britain	4:18.87	
11	Ririka Hironaka	Japan	4:21.31	
12	Caitlyn Collier	United States	4:26.61	
