= 2025 European Athletics U23 Championships – Women's 1500 metres =

Women's 1500 metres at the 2025 European Athletics U23 Championships
- Venue: Fana Stadion
- Location: Bergen, Norway
- Dates: 18 July (heats); 20 July (final)
- Competitors: 33 from 16 nations
- Winning time: 4:08.79

Medalists
gold medal	Dilek Koçak	Turkey
silver medal	Adèle Gay	France
bronze medal	Eimear Maher	Ireland

The women's 1500 metres event at the 2025 European Athletics U23 Championships was held in Bergen, Norway, at Fana Stadion on 18 and 20 July.

== Records ==
Prior to the competition, the records were as follows:

Record	Athlete (nation)	Time (s)	Location	Date
European U23 record	Sifan Hassan (NED)	3:56.05	Monaco, Montecarlo	17 July 2015
Championship U23 record	Amela Terzić (SRB)	4:04.77	Tallinn, Estonia	12 July 2015

== Results ==
=== Heats ===
First 3 in each heat (Q) and the next 3 fastest (q) qualified for the final.

==== Heat 1 ====
Place	Athlete	Nation	Time	Notes
1	Ava Lloyd	Great Britain	4:14.55	Q
2	Anne Gine Løvnes	Norway	4:15.21	Q
3	Jolanda Kallabis	Germany	4:15.77	Q
4	Rocio Garrido	Spain	4:17.33	
5	Melissa Fracassini	Italy	4:18.22	
6	Faustine Chaboche	France	4:18.83	
7	Alice Magnell-Millán	Sweden	4:20.05	
8	Tena Marodi	Croatia	4:20.38	
9	Cara Laverty	Ireland	4:23.66	
10	Dilay Yildizhan	Turkey	4:24.31	
11	Maria Miguel Avelino	Portugal	4:27.25	

==== Heat 2 ====
Place	Athlete	Nation	Time	Notes
1	Adèle Gay	France	4:12.03	Q
2	Nel Vanopstal	Belgium	4:12.24	Q, PB
3	Eimear Maher	Ireland	4:13.84	Q
4	Fabienne Müller	Switzerland	4:14.70	q
5	Valeria Minati	Italy	4:14.74	q, PB
6	Saga Provci	Sweden	4:15.38	
7	Ingeborg Østgård	Norway	4:16.32	
8	Marta Castro	Portugal	4:18.52	PB
9	Charlene Robertson	Netherlands	4:19.48	
10	Lea Marodi	Croatia	4:20.89	PB
11	Dilan Yilmaz	Turkey	4:30.14	

==== Heat 3 ====
Place	Athlete	Nation	Time	Notes
1	Dilek Koçak	Turkey	4:11.91	Q
2	Mena Scatchard	Great Britain	4:12.17	Q
3	Mia Barnett	Sweden	4:12.30	Q
4	Lilly Nägeli	Switzerland	4:12.49	q
5	Marte Hovland	Norway	4:14.90	
6	Louisa Esmouni	France	4:15.09	
7	Emmanouela Plaka	Greece	4:15.11	PB
8	Matilde Prati	Italy	4:16.83	PB
9	Rita Figueiredo	Portugal	4:17.09	PB
10	Mireya Arnedillo	Spain	4:22.48	
11	Tetjana Tschornowol	Ukraine	4:30.48	

=== Final ===
Place	Athlete	Nation	Time	Notes
1st place, gold medalist(s)	Dilek Koçak	Turkey	4:08.79	SB
2nd place, silver medalist(s)	Adèle Gay	France	4:08.99	
3rd place, bronze medalist(s)	Eimear Maher	Ireland	4:09.54	
4	Mena Scatchard	Great Britain	4:09.84	
5	Lilly Nägeli	Switzerland	4:10.38	PB
6	Mia Barnett	Sweden	4:10.50	
7	Nel Vanopstal	Belgium	4:10.94	PB
8	Jolanda Kallabis	Germany	4:11.49	
9	Anne Gine Løvnes	Norway	4:12.12	
10	Ava Lloyd	Great Britain	4:13.04	
11	Valeria Minati	Italy	4:19.67	
12	Fabienne Müller	Switzerland	4:23.24	
