= 2021 European Athletics U23 Championships – Women's 10,000 metres =

Women's 10,000 metres at the 2021 European Athletics U23 Championships
- Venue: Kadriorg Stadium, Tallinn
- Dates: 9 July
- Competitors: 28 from 15 nations
- Winning time: 32:30.49

Medalists
gold medal	Jasmijn Lau	Netherlands
silver medal	Anna Arnaudo	Italy
bronze medal	Lisa Oed	Germany

The women's 10,000 metres event at the 2021 European Athletics U23 Championships was held in Tallinn, Estonia, at Kadriorg Stadium on 9 July.

== Records ==
Prior to the competition, the records were as follows:

European U23 record	Yasemin Can (TUR)	30:26.41	Rio de Janeiro, Brazil	14 August 2016
Championship U23 record	Alina Reh (GER)	31:39.34	Gävle, Sweden	12 July 2019

== Results ==
Rank	Name	Nationality	Time	Notes
1st place, gold medalist(s)	Jasmijn Lau	Netherlands	32:30.49	EU20L
2nd place, silver medalist(s)	Anna Arnaudo	Italy	32:40.43	PB
3rd place, bronze medalist(s)	Lisa Oed	Germany	33:35.99	PB
4	Gaia Colli	Italy	33:44.90	PB
5	Bohdana Semyonova	Ukraine	33:49.59	SB
6	Eva Dieterich	Germany	33:56.30	
7	Beata Topka	Poland	34:05.78	
8	Eleanor Bolton	Great Britain	34:06.67	
9	Mélody Julien	France	34:18.36	
10	Eugénie Lorain	France	34:43.50	
11	Julia-Anna Lily Bell	Czech Republic	34:48.01	PB
12	Orla O'Connor	Ireland	34:57.28	
13	Alina Sönning	Switzerland	35:00.46	PB
14	Dilek Öztürk	Turkey	35:01.10	PB
15	Ana Patricia Campos	Spain	35:02.72	
16	Juliette Thomas	Belgium	35:05.81	
17	Viktoriya Kovba	Ukraine	35:22.15	
18	Mélanie Bovy	Belgium	35:24.88	
19	Oliwia Sarnecka	Poland	35:26.51	
20	Carlota Rodés	Spain	35:27.17	
21	Sara Duarte	Portugal	35:32.94	
22	Aoife O'Cuill	Ireland	35:50.43	
23	Iryna Dovhusha	Ukraine	35:59.42	
24	Gabriela Veigertová	Czech Republic	36:44.33	
25	Kalliopi Skarpeti	Greece	37:09.87	
	Emina Akbingöl	Turkey	DNF	
	Linn Lara Kleine	Germany	DNF	
	Giovanna Selva	Italy	DNF	
