= Adèle Gay =

French athlete

- Gay in 2025

Personal information
- Born: 16 October 2004 (age 22) Louviers, France
- Height: 173 cm (5 ft 8 in)
- Weight: 56 kg (123 lb)

Sport
- Country: France
- Sport: Athletics
- Event: Middle distance running

Achievements and titles
- Personal bests: 800m: 2:02.76 (2025); 1500m: 4:01.21 (2026)
Medal record
Women's athletics
Representing France
European U23 Championships
Silver medal – second place	2025 Bergen	1500m

Adèle Gay (born 16 October 2004) is a French middle-distance runner.

== Biography ==
She was born in Louviers and grew up in Val-de-Reuil in Normandy. She started athletics at the PM Elite Team in Amiens. She broke Normandy junior records in the 800 metres, 1500 metres, and 5000 metres. She later became a member of VRAC athletics club in Val-de-Reuil. In 2023, she won the French junior indoors title over 800 metres in Lyon, before later that year winning the French junior title outdoors, in the 1500 metres in Châteauroux. She placed eleventh competing for France at the 2023 European Athletics U20 Championships in Jerusalem.

She won the French U23 Championships over 1500 metres in 2024 in Albi. She later joined Amiens UC Athletics club. She won the French U23 Indoor Championships over 1500 metres in February 2025 in Nantes. She lowered her personal best for the 1500 metres to 4:07.00 in Troyes in June 2025. She competed for France at the 2025 European Athletics U23 Championships in Bergen, Norway, winning her senior-final heat in 4:12.03 before winning the silver medal in the final.

Competing in France on 24 January 2026, she placed second to Delia Sclabas in the 1500m at the Meeting Indoor de Lyon, a World Athletics Indoor Tour Bronze meeting, in 4:11.23. She placed third in the 1500 metres behind Agathe Guillemot and Bérénice Cleyet-Merle at the 2026 French Indoor Athletics Championships in Aubiere. She was selected for the 1500 m at the 2026 World Athletics Indoor Championships in Toruń, Poland, but did not advance to the final. In May, she won the 1500 metres at the Trond Mohn Games in Bergen, running 4:06.93. She ran a new personal best of 4:03.13 for the 1500 m on 28 June at the 2026 Meeting de Paris. In July, she won the 1500m in 4:01.21 at the Meeting Stanislas Nancy in France. On 25 July 2026, she placed second in the 1500 metres at the 2026 French Championships. On 16 August, she placed sixth in the final of the 1500 metres in a slow tactical race at the 2026 European Championships in Birmingham, England.
