= 2021 European Athletics U23 Championships – Women's 1500 metres =

Women's 1500 metres at the 2021 European Athletics U23 Championships
- Venue: Kadriorg Stadium, Tallinn
- Dates: 9, 11 July
- Competitors: 17 from 12 nations
- Winning time: 4:13.98

Medalists
| gold medal | Gaia Sabbatini | Italy |
| silver medal | Marta Zenoni | Italy |
| bronze medal | Erin Wallace | Great Britain |

The men's 1500 metres event at the 2021 European Athletics U23 Championships was held in Tallinn, Estonia, at Kadriorg Stadium on 9 and 11 July.

== Records ==
Prior to the competition, the records were as follows:

| European U23 record | Sifan Hassan (NED) | 3:56.05 | Monaco | 17 July 2015 |
| Championship U23 record | Amela Terzić (SRB) | 4:04.77 | Tallinn, Estonia | 12 July 2015 |

== Results ==
=== Round 1 ===
Qualification rule: First 4 in each heat (Q) and the next 4 fastest (q) advance to the Final.

| Rank | Heat | Name | Nationality | Time | Notes |
|---|---|---|---|---|---|
| 1 | 2 | Águeda Marqués | Spain | 4:15.69 | Q |
| 2 | 2 | Gaia Sabbatini | Italy | 4:15.77 | Q |
| 3 | 2 | Stephanie Cotter | Ireland | 4:15.88 | Q |
| 4 | 2 | Eliza Megger | Poland | 4:16.03 | Q |
| 5 | 2 | Joceline Wind | Switzerland | 4:16.22 | q, PB |
| 6 | 1 | Erin Wallace | Great Britain | 4:17.23 | Q |
| 6 | 1 | Klaudia Kazimierska | Poland | 4:17.23 | Q |
| 8 | 1 | Silan Ayyıldız | Turkey | 4:17.31 | Q, PB |
| 9 | 1 | Marta Zenoni | Italy | 4:17.38 | Q |
| 10 | 1 | Bérénice Fulchiron | France | 4:17.42 | q |
| 11 | 2 | Ludovica Cavalli | Italy | 4:17.55 | q |
| 12 | 1 | Aleksandra Płocińska | Poland | 4:19.55 | q |
| 13 | 1 | Sivan Auerbach | Israel | 4:19.97 | |
| 14 | 1 | Christine Næss | Norway | 4:21.03 | PB |
| 15 | 2 | Selma Engdahl | Norway | 4:22.01 | PB |
| 16 | 2 | Aina Cinca Bons | Andorra | 4:51.99 | |
| | 2 | Wilma Nielsen | Sweden | DNF | |

=== Final ===
| Rank | Name | Nationality | Time | Notes |
|---|---|---|---|---|
| 1st place, gold medalist(s) | Gaia Sabbatini | Italy | 4:13.98 | |
| 2nd place, silver medalist(s) | Marta Zenoni | Italy | 4:14.50 | |
| 3rd place, bronze medalist(s) | Erin Wallace | Great Britain | 4:14.85 | |
| 4 | Águeda Marqués | Spain | 4:14.87 | |
| 5 | Eliza Megger | Poland | 4:15.07 | |
| 6 | Stephanie Cotter | Ireland | 4:17.21 | |
| 7 | Klaudia Kazimierska | Poland | 4:17.47 | |
| 8 | Bérénice Fulchiron | France | 4:18.62 | |
| 9 | Aleksandra Płocińska | Poland | 4:18.88 | |
| 10 | Joceline Wind | Switzerland | 4:19.57 | |
| 11 | Silan Ayyıldız | Turkey | 4:19.63 | |
| 12 | Ludovica Cavalli | Italy | 4:24.90 | |
