= Eimear Maher =

Irish athlete (born 2003)

Personal information
- Born: 10 August 2003 (age 23)

Sport
- Sport: Athletics
- Event: Middle distance running

Achievements and titles
- Personal bests: 800m: 2:04.38 (Dublin, 2025); 1500m: 4:08.67 (Dublin, 2025)
Medal record
Women's athletics
Representing Ireland
European U23 Championships
Bronze medal – third place	2025 Bergen	1500m

Eimear Maher (born 10 August 2003) is an Irish middle-distance runner.

== Early life ==
Maher joined Dundrum South Dublin Athletics Club in 2015 at the age of eleven years-old. She attended Mount Anville Secondary School in Dublin. She was a winner at the Irish Schools Championships.

== Career ==
Maher competed for Ireland in the under-20 category at the 2019 European Cross Country Championships. She won her age-group cross country title at the All-Ireland Schools Cross-Country in Santry in March 2020. She was selected for the Irish U23 team at the 2023 European Cross Country Championships in Brussels.

In May 2025, Maher lowered her 1500 personal best to 4:14.87 at the Belfast Milers Meet. She ran a new personal best for the 800 metres of 2:04.38 in Dublin in June 2025. She ran a personal best for the 1500 metres at the Morton Games in Dublin, running 4:08.67 in July 2025. Later that month, she won the bronze medal over 1500 metres at the 2025 European Athletics U23 Championships in Bergen, Norway.

Maher placed third in the U23 race at the 2025 Irish National Cross Country Championships held in Derry on 23 November. She was selected to compete in the mixed team relay at the 2025 European Cross Country Championships in Portugal.

Maher placed third in the women's senior race at the 2026 Irish Cross Country Championships.
