= Sebastiano Parolini =

Italian athlete (born 1998)

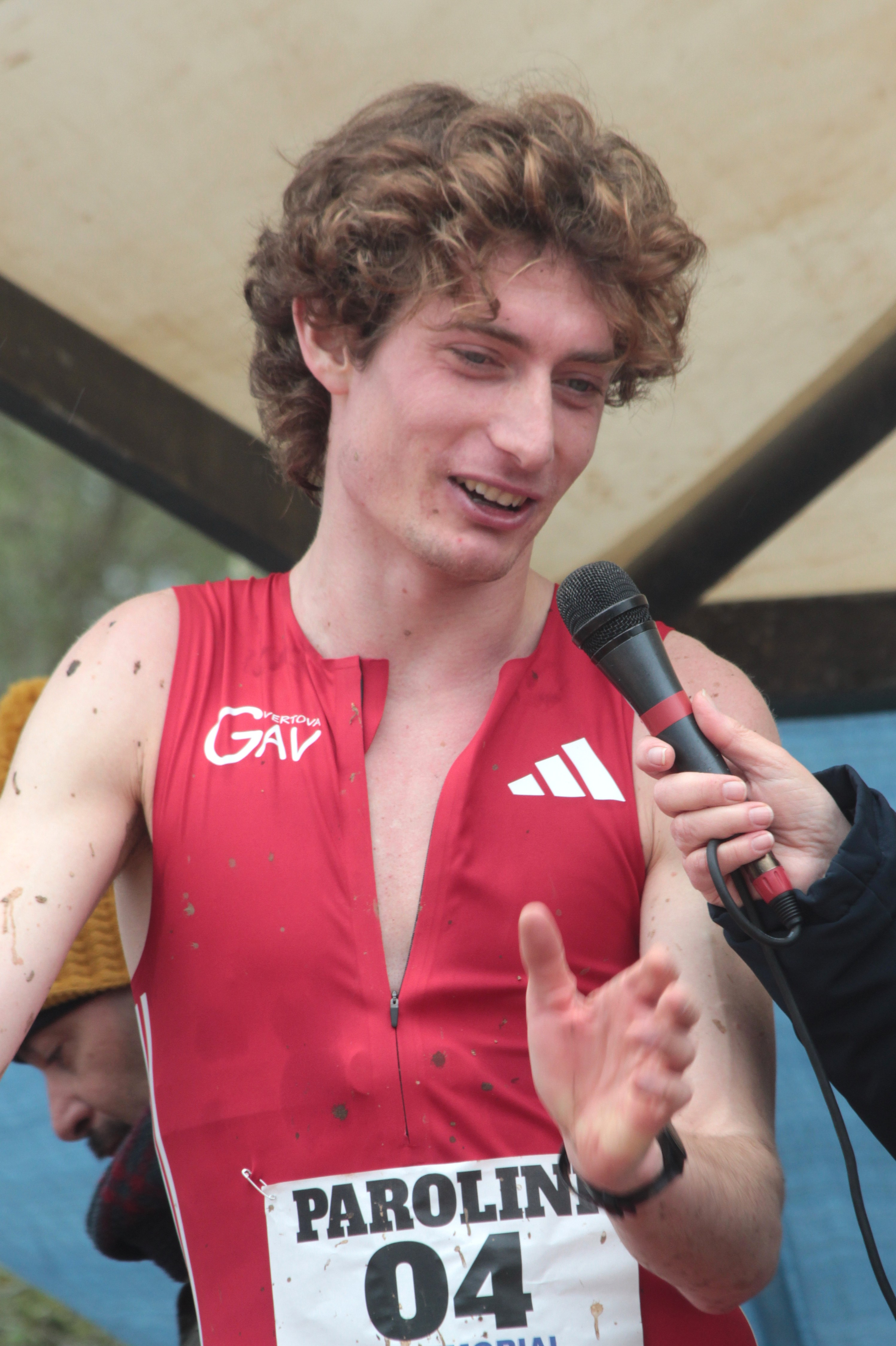

Personal information
- Born: 9 February 1998 (age 28)

Sport
- Sport: Athletics
- Event: Long distance running

Achievements and titles
- Personal best: 5000m: 13:45.08 (2024)
Medal record
Men's athletics
Representing Italy
European Cross Country Championships
Gold medal – first place	2025 Lagoa	Mixed relay
Gold medal – first place	2024 Antalya	Mixed relay
Silver medal – second place	2019 Lisbon	U23 team

Sebastiano Parolini (born 9 February 1998) is an Italian runner. He was a gold medalist in the mixed team relay at the 2024 European Cross Country Championships.

== Career ==
He won a silver medal in the U23 team race at the 2019 European Cross Country Championships, having finished in 17th place individually. In 2020, he was third in the Italian U23 indoor championships over 3000 metres, and runner-up in the Italian Championships outdoors over both 5000 metres and 10,000 metres.

He had success in a number of domestic races in 2022 and lowered his 1500 metres personal best to 3:41. In November 2023, he won the short course race at the Turin Internarional Cross.

He became Italian short course cross country champion in March 2024. On 8 December 2024, he was part of the Italian mixed relay team which won the gold medal at the 2024 European Cross Country Championships in Antalya, Turkey. In January 2025, whilst running in the colours of Gruppo Alpinistico Vertovese (GAV), he won the Campaccio, short course cross country race held in San Giorgio su Legnano, Milan in a time of 10:11, while Nadia Battocletti won the women's race.

He won the short course 3 km race at Cinque Mulini in November 2025. He won the gold medal in the mixed team relay at the 2025 European Cross Country Championships in Portugal. Later that month, running a 5 km race on the roads in Battersea, England on 31 December, he placed third in 13:38.

In August 2026, he competed at the 2026 European Athletics Championships in Birmingham, England, in the 5000 metres.

== Personal life ==
He is from Barzizza, a hamlet of Gandino in the Province of Bergamo in the Italian region of Lombardy. His father Gerardo was a football player and his mother Daniela Vassalli is an athlete. He studied medicine at the University of Brescia. He then specialised in sports medicine at the University of Milano-Bicocca and worked as a doctor for the Italian national freestyle and alpine skiing teams.
