= Erin Wallace =

Scottish middle-distance runner (born 2000)

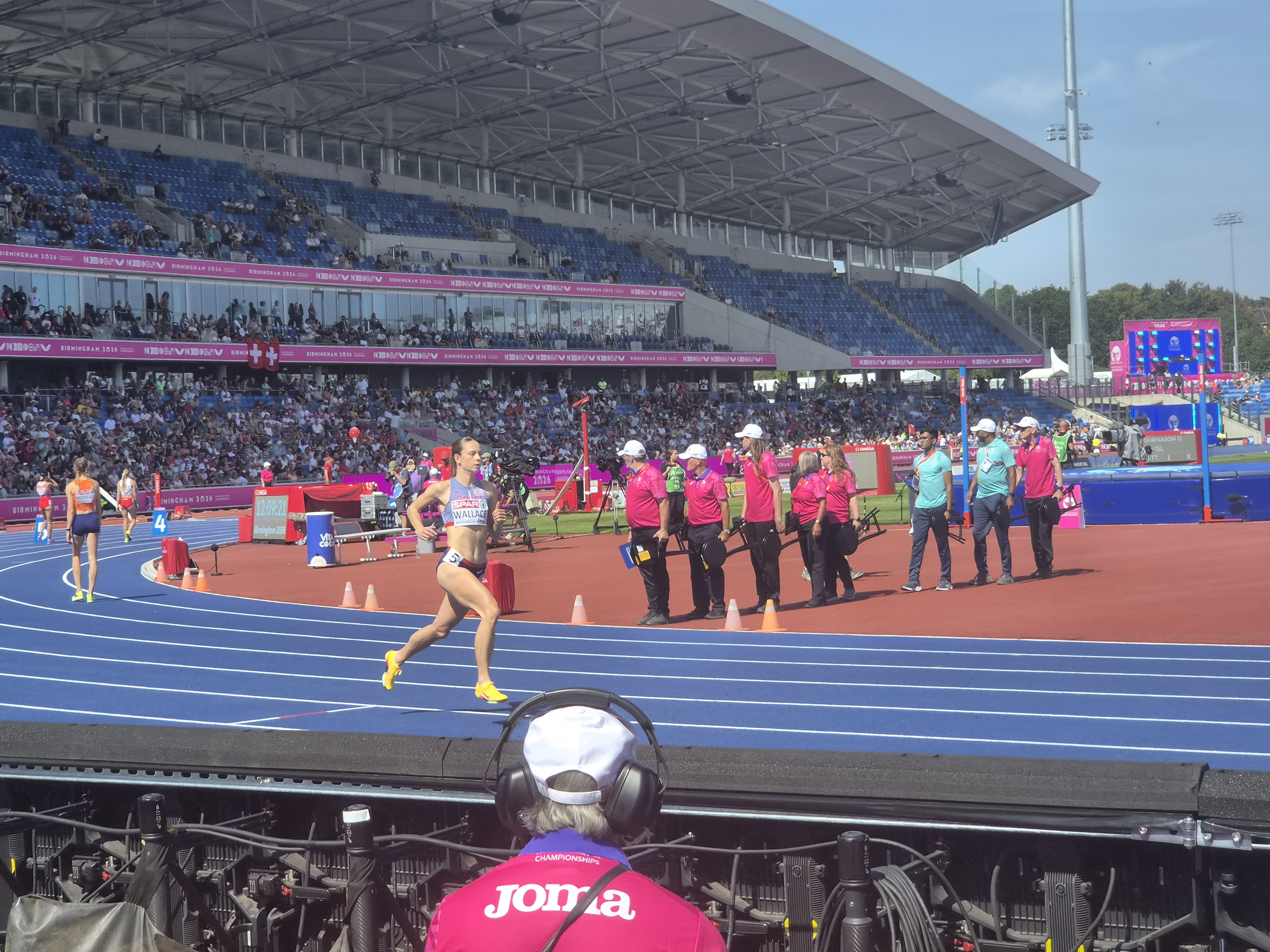
- Wallace competing for Great Britain in 2026

Personal information
- Born: 18 May 2000 (age 26)

Sport
- Country: Great Britain (Scotland)
- Sport: Athletics, Triathlon
- Event: Middle-distance running

Achievements and titles
- Personal bests: 800m: 1:59.19 (2024); 1500 m: 4:01.10 (2025)
Medal record
Women's athletics
Representing Great Britain
European U23 Championships
Bronze medal – third place	2021 Tallinn	1500 m
European U18 Championships
Bronze medal – third place	2016 Tbilisi	1500 m
Representing Scotland
Commonwealth Youth Games
Gold medal – first place	2017 Bahamas	1500m

Erin Wallace (born 18 May 2000) is a Scottish triathlete and middle distance runner.

== Early life ==
Wallace attended school at Eastwood High School, Newton Mearns in East Renfrewshire. Wallace studied neuroscience at the University of Glasgow.

== Career ==
Wallace won age-group won Scottish cross-country titles in 2014 and 2015. She broke the UK under-17 indoor 800 metres record with 2:06.59 in 2016, also set Scottish indoor records over 1500m and 3000m with 4:25.75 and 9:36.07, which placed her second and third all-time in the UK for the respective distances. Later that year she was a 2016 European Athletics Youth Championships bronze medallist in Tbilisi in 2016, over 1500 metres. She became a British international in January 2017 at the Great Edinburgh International. She represented Scotland in the Bahamas at the 2017 Commonwealth Youth Games, winning gold in the 1500m metres.

Wallace made her senior Commonwealth Games debut at the Gold Coast in 2018, competing in the Triathlon mixed team relay event, finishing in 7th place. That year, she won silver in Gold Coast in the World Triathlon Junior Women's Grand Final in 2017. She finished seventh at the World Athletics U20 Championships over 1500 metres in Tampere in 2018. In September, she was nominated at the Scottish Sports Award for Young Athlete of the Year.

Wallace was a European U23 Championships bronze medallist in 2021 in Tallinn over 1500 metres. In February 2022, Wallace was runner-up at the British Indoor Athletics Championships in the 1500 metres. However, a stress fracture in her foot caused her to miss the outdoor season that year. For 2023, she changed her coaching set-up to train with Trevor Painter and Jenny Meadows in Manchester.

On 17 February 2024, she qualified for the final of the 800m at the 2024 British Indoor Athletics Championships in Birmingham. In the final she finished in third position, running a new personal best of 2:01.35. In May 2024 she ran a personal best 1:59.20 for the 800m at the British Milers Club race in Manchester. She was selected to run the 800 metres for Britain at the 2024 European Athletics Championships in Rome. She came through her heat to reach the semi finals where she ran 1:59.89, her third quickest time ever, without qualifying for the final. At the London Athletics Meet on 20 July 2024, she acted as pacemaker for the 800 metres in which Keely Hodgkinson set a new British national record time of 1:54.61, and Jemma Reekie moved to second on the all-time British list and Georgia Bell to fourth.

Wallace finished fourth in the 800 metres race at the 2025 British Indoor Athletics Championships in Birmingham, on 23 February 2025. She was selected for the British team for the 2025 European Athletics Indoor Championships in Apeldoorn. She placed ninth in the 800 metres at the 2025 Shanghai Diamond League event in China on 3 May 2025. The following month she lowered her 1500 metres personal best to 4:02.74 whilst racing in France. On 3 August, she placed fourth in the 1500 metres at the 2025 UK Athletics Championships in Birmingham. In September 2025, she competed over 1500 metres at the 2025 World Championships in Tokyo, Japan, without advancing to the semi-finals.

On 3 February 2026, Wallace lowered her indoor personal best for the 1500 metres to 4:07.73 at the Golden Gala in Ostrava. Later that month, she placed sixth in the final of the 1500 metres at the 2026 British Indoor Athletics Championships in Birmingham. On 1 March in Glasgow, Wallace went inside the British Athletics qualifying time for the World Indoors with 4:04.20 for the 1500m. In May, she competed in Poland, and ran 4:04.01 for second place in the 1500m behind home runner Klaudia Kazimierska at the Irena Szewińska Memorial and on 7 June, she had a top-three finish in 4:02.87 in the 1500 m at the 2026 Bauhausgalan in Stockholm. In June, she placed fourth in the final of the 1500 metres at the 2026 UK Championships.

Wallace was named in the Scottish team for the 2026 Commonwealth Games in Glasgow, reaching the semi-finals of the 800 metres. She also competed in the women's mile at the Games. In August, she competed at the 2026 European Athletics Championships in Birmingham, England, in the women's 800 metres.
