= James McMurray =

English middle-distance runner (born 1995)

Personal information
- Born: 18 January 1996 (age 30)

Sport
- Sport: Athletics
- Event: Middle-distance running
- Club: St Albans Athletics Club

Achievements and titles
- Personal best(s): 800m: 1:46.96 (Watford, 2022); 1500m: 3:37.72 (Oordegem, 2025); 3000m: 7:53.97 (Sheffield, 2026); 5000m: 13:43.35 (London, 2025); Indoor; 800m: 1:49.42 (Birmingham, 2023); 1500m: 3:38.36 (Birmingham, 2026); Mile:3:57.60 (London, 2025); 3000m: 7:53.97 (Sheffield, 2026)
Medal record
Men's cross country
Representing Great Britain
European Cross Country Championships
Gold medal – first place	2019 Lisbon	Mixed relay

James McMurray (born 18 January 1995) is a British middle-distance runner. He was a gold medalist representing Great Britain in the mixed relay at the 2019 European Cross Country Championships and won the English national 10k road race title in 2025.

== Biography ==
McMurray is from Harpenden and attended Sir John Lawes School. A talented runner from an early age, he ranked number one in Great Britain for the 800 metres at under-13 level. He is a member of St Albans Athletics Club.

McMurray placed fifth over 1500 metres at his debut at the British Indoor Athletics Championships debut in 2016 in Sheffield, running a personal best time of 3:49:29 during the championships.

In May 2019, McMurray represented England at the Loughborough International, placing second in the 800 metres. In December 2019, McMurray was a gold medalist representing Great Britain in the mixed relay at the 2019 European Cross Country Championships in Lisbon, running the second leg, alongside Sarah McDonald, Alex Bell and Jonathan Davies. McMurray and Bell both ran the fastest times in their stages.

In February 2023, McMurray placed third over 800 metres at the 2023 British Indoor Athletics Championships.

In December 2025, McMurray won the Abbey Dash 10k which hosted the England Senior 10k Championships road race, winning in a time of 28.52. In 2025, McMurray ran a 3000 metres personal best of 7:59 at the BMC Sheffield Indoor Grand Prix, improving it when he won the race the following year in 7:53.97.

On 15 February 2026, McMurray placed second in the 1500 metres at the 2026 British Indoor Athletics Championships in a Birmingham, behind Jack Higgins, running an indoors personal best of 3:38.36. He was named in the British team for the 1500 metres at the 2026 World Athletics Indoor Championships in Toruń, Poland, and placed seventh in his heat in 3:42.51 on 20 March.
