= Stephanie Cotter =

Irish middle-distance runner

Personal information
- Born: 27 January 1999 (age 27) Cork, Ireland

Sport
- Country: Ireland
- Sport: Track and field
- Events: 1500 metres 5000 metres 800 metres
- Club: Adams State University
Medal record
Women's athletics
Representing Ireland
European Cross Country Championships
Bronze medal – third place	2019 Lisbon	6000 m

Stephanie Cotter (born 27 January 1999) is an Irish athlete who specialises in the 1500 metres and 5000 metres. Cotter won individual bronze at the 2019 European Cross Country Championships, and is a two-time European U23 Championships 1500m finalist, placing sixth in the 1500m final at the 2021 European U23 Championships in Tallinn. Stephanie has also won multiple Irish National Championship titles. Cotter was supported by West Muskerry Athletic Club as a youth.

== Biography ==
Stephanie Cotter was born in Cork, Ireland.

== International competition ==
Year	Competition	Venue	Position	Notes
Representing Ireland / United Kingdom
2019	European U23 Championships	Gävle, Sweden	12th	4:35.82
2019	European U23 Cross Country Championships	Lisbon, Portugal	3rd	21:15
2021	European U23 Championships	Tallinn, Estonia	6th	4:17.21

a

=== Domestic Championships ===
Year	Competition

the

Position	Event	Time		
2018	Athletics Ireland U20 Outdoor Track and Field Championships; Tullamore, Ireland	1st	1500 m	4:48.48
2018	Athletics Ireland Senior Indoor Track and Field Championships; Abbotstown, Ireland	10th	1500 m	4:45.61
2018	Athletics Ireland U20 Indoor Track and Field Championships; Athlone, Ireland	2nd	1500 m	4:38.30
2017	Athletics Ireland U19 School Outdoor Track and Field Championships; Tullamore, Ireland	1st	1500 m	4:34.09
2017	Athletics Ireland U19 School Outdoor Track and Field Championships; Tullamore, Ireland	1st	800 m	2:16.26
2017	Athletics Ireland U20 Indoor Track and Field Championships; Tullamore, Ireland	2nd	1500 m	4:42.94
2017	Athletics Ireland U20 Indoor Track and Field Championships; Tullamore, Ireland	2nd	800 m	2:15.72
2015	Athletics Ireland U20 Indoor Track and Field Championships; Athlone, Ireland	7th	1500 m	4:55.60

=== NCAA ===
Year	Competition	Position	Event	Time
Representing Adams State University Grizzlies
2023	NCAA Div II Indoor Track & Field Championships	1st	Mile	4:49.86
2023	NCAA Div II Indoor Track & Field Championships	1st	3000 meters	9:06.03
2023	NCAA Div II Indoor Track & Field Championships	2nd	DMR	11:16.28
2023	Rocky Mountain Athletic Conference Indoor Track and Field Championships	1st	DMR	11:42.95
2022	NCAA Women's Division II Cross Country Championship	1st	6000 m	19:45.2
2022	Rocky Mountain Athletic Conference Cross Country Championships	1st	6000 m	20:45.8
2021	NCAA Div II Outdoor Track & Field Championships	1st	1500 m	4:14.96
2021	Rocky Mountain Athletic Conference Outdoor Track and Field Championships	1st	1500 m	4:37.79
2021	NCAA Div II Indoor Track & Field Championships	1st	Mile	4:51.72
2020	Rocky Mountain Athletic Conference Indoor Track and Field Championships	1st	DMR	11:54.45
2019	NCAA Women's Division II Cross Country Championship	1st	6000 m	19:15.5
2019	Rocky Mountain Athletic Conference Cross Country Championships	1st	6000 m	19:40.3
2019	NCAA Div II Outdoor Track & Field Championships	1st	1500 m	4:36.91
2019	NCAA Div II Indoor Track & Field Championships	1st	DMR	11:21.24
2019	NCAA Div II Indoor Track & Field Championships	1st	Mile	4:50.27
2019	Rocky Mountain Athletic Conference Indoor Track and Field Championships	1st	DMR	11:54.83
2019	Rocky Mountain Athletic Conference Indoor Track and Field Championships	7th	4 × 400 m	4:06.77
2019	Rocky Mountain Athletic Conference Indoor Track and Field Championships	2nd	Mile	5:03.67
2018	NCAA Women's Division II Cross Country Championship	11th	6000 m	22:58.2
2018	Rocky Mountain Athletic Conference Cross Country Championships	11th	6000 m	22:04.3
