= Roisin Flanagan =

Irish athlete (born 1997)

Personal information
- Nationality: Irish
- Born: 2 May 1997 (age 29)

Sport
- Sport: Athletics
- Event: Long distance running
- College team: Adams State Grizzlies

Achievements and titles
- Personal best(s): 1500m: 4:15.50 (Dublin, 2021); Mile: 4:40.12 (Albuquerque, 2024); 3000m: 8:53.02 (Glasgow, 2024); 2 Miles: 9:36.70 (New York, 2024); 5000m: 15:26.32 (Walnut, 2023)
Medal record
Women's athletics
Representing Ireland
European Cross Country Championships
Bronze medal – third place	2022 Turin	Team
Silver medal – second place	2019 Lisbon	U23 team

Roisin Flanagan (born 2 May 1997) is an Irish long-distance runner. She has represented the Republic of Ireland at multiple international championships, and Northern Ireland at the 2022 Commonwealth Games. Her twin sister Eilish Flanagan is similarly an international long-distance runner.

== Early life and education ==
From Gortin in County Tyrone, Flanagan attended Sacred Heart College, Omagh before she and her twin sister, Eilish Flanagan, also a distance runner, earned scholarships at Adams State University in Colorado. They were named Sportswomen of the Month in December 2022 by the Irish Times.

== Career ==
Flanagan competes for Finn Valley Athletic Club. She ran at the 2022 European Athletics Championships in Munich, Germany, where she finished 14th overall in the 5000m race. Flanagan broke her own Northern Ireland record by over a second when she finished 11th in 15:26.76 in the 5,000 metres at the 2022 Commonwealth Games in Birmingham. It was the fourth time in a year she had broken the record.

In December 2022, Flanagan participated in the European Cross County Championships in Turin, Italy in a team alongside her twin sister, where they helped secure a bronze team medal for Ireland in the team event.

In May 2023, Flanagan took half a second off her own Northern Ireland 5000m record, whilst competing in California.

Flanagan set an Irish record over 2 Miles (9:36.70) when competing at the Millrose Games in February 2024 in New York. She was selected for the 2024 World Athletics Indoor Championships in Glasgow where she competed in the women's 3000 metres race and ran a personal best time of 8:53.02.

She won the 3000 metres race at the Irish Indoor Athletics Championships at Abbotstown on 23 February 2025 in 9:14.02.
