= Gaia Sabbatini =

Italian middle-distance runner

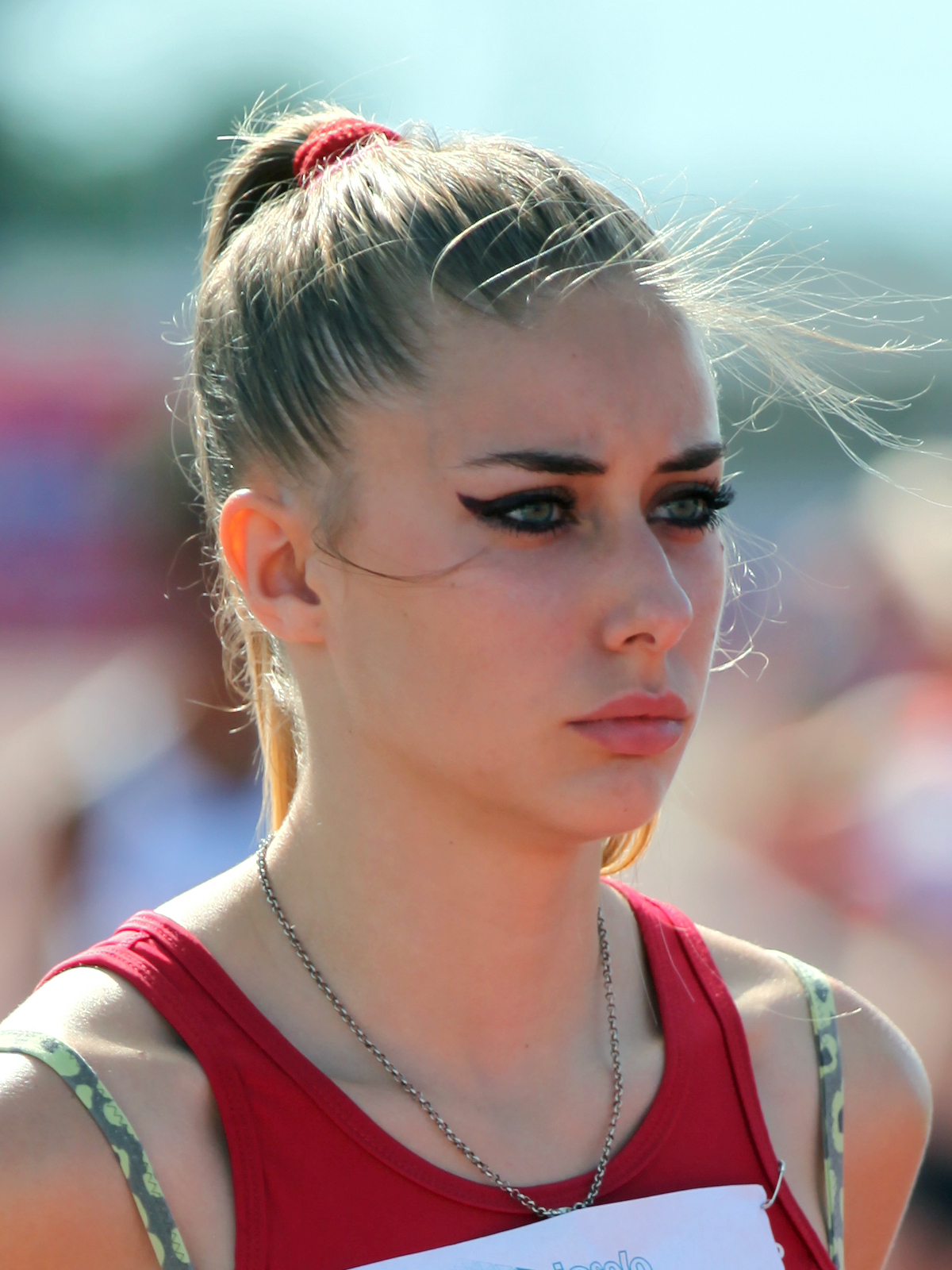
- Sabbatini in 2016

Personal information
- National team: Italy: 2 caps (2020-2021)
- Born: 10 June 1999 (age 27) Teramo, Italy
- Height: 1.80 m (5 ft 11 in)
- Weight: 57 kg (126 lb)

Sport
- Sport: Athletics
- Event: Middle-distance running
- Club: G.S. Fiamme Azzurre; Atletica Gran Sasso Teramo
- Coached by: Andrea Ceccarelli (2018–); Marcello Vicerè (2013–2017)
Medal record
Women's athletics
Representing Italy
European Team Championships
Gold medal – first place	2021 Silesia	1500 m
European U23 Championships
Gold medal – first place	2021 Tallinn	1500 m
European Cross Country Championships
Gold medal – first place	2022 Turin	Mixed relay

Gaia Sabbatini (10 June 1999) is an Italian middle distance runner. She won the gold medal in the 1500 metres at the 2021 European Under-23 Championships. Sabbatini is the Italian indoor record holder for the 1000 metres.

She won three Italian national titles at senior level.

In February 2020, in graduating absolute Italian champion, Gaia Sabbatini became the first athlete from Teramo to conquer a national title.

She represented Italy at the postponed 2020 Tokyo Olympics in 2021, competing in the 1500 metres.

At the 2022 European Cross Country Championships on home soil in Turin, Sabbatini ran the anchor leg of the mixed 4 x 1500 m relay, securing Italy first ever victory in this event.

== Achievements ==
=== International competitions ===
Representing Italy
Year	Competition	Venue	Position	Event	Result
2017	European U20 Championships	(Italy) Grosseto	8th	1500 m	4:22.84 (Note: Sabbatini ran 4:20.17 in the heats.)
2018	World U20 Championships	(Finland) Tampere	13th (h)	1500 m	4:22.50
2021	European Indoor Championships	(Poland) Toruń	16th (h)	1500 m	4:17.21
2021	European Team Championships Super League	(Poland) Chorzów	1st	1500 m	4:14.87
2021	European U23 Championships	(Estonia) Tallinn	1st	1500 m	4:13.98
2021	Olympic Games	(Japan) Tokyo	14th (sf)	1500 m	4:02.25 PB
2022	World Championships	(United States) Eugene, OR	– (sf)	1500 m	DQ
2022	European Championships	(Germany) Munich	9th	1500 m	4:06.04
2022	European Cross Country Championships	(Italy) Turin	1st	Mixed relay	17:23

=== National titles ===
- Italian Athletics Indoor Championships
  - 800 metres: 2022
  - 1500 metres: 2020, 2021

=== Personal bests ===
- 800 metres – 2:00.75 (Rovereto 2021)
  - 800 metres indoor – 2:01.07 (Ancona 2022)
- 1000 metres – 2:48.06 (Rome 2017)
  - 1000 metres indoor – 2:38.67 (Birmingham 2022) NR
- 1500 metres – 3:59.49 (Budapest 2025)
  - 1500 metres indoor – 4:10.25 (Madrid 2022)
- Mile – 4:31.74 (Milan 2021)

=== Progression ===
Key: Lifetime best

1500 m
Year (age)	Performance	Venue	Date
2022 (23)	4:01.93	(United States) Eugene, OR	28 MAY 2022
2021 (22)	4:02.25	(Japan) Tokyo	04 AUG 2021
2020 (21)	4:11.27	(Belgium) Heusden-Zolder	06 SEP 2020
2019 (20)	4:33.19	(Italy) Brixen	28 JUL 2019
2018 (19)	4:19.69	(Italy) Cles	25 AUG 2018
2017 (18)	4:20.17	(Italy) Grosseto	21 JUL 2017
2016 (17)	4:45.45	(Italy) Ascoli Piceno	30 JUL 2016

== See also ==
- Italian all-time top lists - 800 m
- Italian all-time top lists - 1500 m
