= Eilish Flanagan =

Irish athlete

Personal information
- Nationality: Irish
- Born: 2 May 1997 (age 29)

Sport
- Sport: Track and Field
- Event: 3000m steeplechase
- College team: Adams State Grizzlies
Medal record
Women's athletics
Representing Ireland
European Cross Country Championships
Bronze medal – third place	2022 Turin	Team
Silver medal – second place	2019 Lisbon	U23 team

Eilish Flanagan (born 2 May 1997) is an Irish long-distance runner. She competed in the 3000 metres steeplechase at the 2020 Olympics.

== Early life and education ==
From Gortin in County Tyrone, Flanagan attended Sacred Heart College, Omagh before she and her twin sister, Roisin Flanagan, also a distance runner, earned scholarships at Adams State University in Colorado.

== Athletic career ==
Whilst at Adams State she set a new NCAA Division II record in the 1500 metres, and won the 2021 NCAA Division II Outdoor Track & Field Championship in the 3000 metres steeplechase, as well as finishing runner up in the 5,000 metres in 2021 and the 6,000 metres cross country race in 2019. She has run for the Omagh Harriers, and the Carmern Runners Athletics Club. She and her sister ran on the Irish team, which won a women's under-23 team silver medal at the 2019 European Cross Country Championships in Lisbon.

In May 2021, Flanagan beat her personal best by 12 seconds to set a new Northern Ireland 3000 metres steeplechase record of 9 mins 40.68 secs at a meeting in Eugene, Oregon.

In July 2021, she was confirmed as selected on the Ireland team for the delayed 2020 Summer Games in Tokyo to compete in the 3000 metres steeplechase. She ran a personal best time at the Olympics.

In August 2022 she finished sixth in the women’s 3000m steeplechase final at the Commonwealth Games. Later that month Flanagan competed in the 3000 metres steeplechase at the European Athletics Championships in Munich. In December 2022 Flanagan and her sister participated in the European Cross County Championships in Turin, where they helped secure a bronze team medal for Ireland.
