= Alemaz Samuel =

Ethiopian middle- and long-distance runner

Personal information
- Full name: Alemaz Teshale Samuel
- Nationality: Ethiopian
- Born: 5 July 1999 (age 26)

Sport
- Sport: Athletics
- Event(s): 1500 metres, 3000 metres

Achievements and titles
- Personal bests: 1500m: 4:01.78 (2018); 3000m: 8:37.68 (2018)
Medal record
Women's athletics
Representing Ethiopia
World U20 Championships
Gold medal – first place	2018 Tampere	1500 m
African U20 Championships
Bronze medal – third place	2017 Tlemcen	1500 m

Alemaz Teshale Samuel (also known as Alemaz Samuel or Almaz Samuel; born 5 July 1999) is an Ethiopian middle-distance runner. She was the 2018 World Junior champion in the women's 1500 metres.

== Biography ==
Samuel's first major international competition was the 2017 Shanghai Diamond League, where she finished 10th in the 1500 m with a time of 4:07.41 as a 17 year old.

In 2018, Samuel won her first global title at the 2018 World Junior Championships, in the women's 1500 m. She closed her final 400 metres in 61.04 seconds, enough to win a tactical race and make her the third consecutive Ethiopian winner in that event.

Samuel was particularly dominant in the 2019 IAAF World Indoor Tour series, having won the 3000 m races at the Madrid and Birmingham meetings. Her final score of 27 points was more than double that of the runners up, Melissa Courtney-Bryant and Konstanze Klosterhalfen, each with 10 points.

In 2021, Samuel started running half marathons. At the 2021 Barcelona Half Marathon, Samuel finish 5th in a time of 1:08:53.

== Statistics ==
=== Personal bests ===
Event	Mark	Competition	Venue	Date
1500 metres	4:01.78	Doha Diamond League	Doha, Qatar	4 May 2018
3000 metres	8:37.68	Zagreb Meeting	Zagreb, Croatia	4 September 2018
