= Line Brandt Pedersen =

Danish long-distance runner

Personal information
- Born: 4 June 1991 (age 34)

Sport
- Country: Denmark
- Sport: Long-distance running

Line Brandt Pedersen (born 4 June 1991) is a Danish long-distance runner. She competed in the senior women's race at the 2019 IAAF World Cross Country Championships held in Aarhus, Denmark. She finished in 84th place.
