= Mena Scatchard =

British middle-distance runner

Personal information
- Nationality: British (Scottish)
- Born: 28 January 2003 (age 23)

Sport
- Sport: Athletics
- Events: Middle-distance running, Cross country running

Achievements and titles
- Personal bests: 800m: 2:00.81 (Princeton, 2025); 1500m: 4:08.34 (Jacksonville, 2025); Mile: 4:28.43 (Boston, 2025); 3000m: 8:47.80 (Boston, 2025)

Mena Scatchard (born 28 January 2003) is a British middle-distance runner.

== Early life ==
From North Yorkshire, she attended Ripon Grammar School. In 2021, she earned a sports scholarship to attend Princeton University in the United States, initially to study for a liberal arts degree. In May 2025, she was announced to be transferring to Stanford University for the academic year starting in the autumn of 2025 for her post-graduate degree.

== Career ==
She ran as a member of Leeds City Athletics Club and Ripon Runners Club, was a three-time Yorkshire age-group champion whilst a teenager in distances from 1500 metres to 3000 metres.

Running for Princeton University, she finished ninth at the Northeast Regional cross country championships in 2024, before competing in the 2024 NCAA Division I Cross Country Championships.

She won the women's mile at the Eagle Invitational in February 2025 in Boston, Massachusetts, with a time of 4:28.43 which broke the Princeton school record she set earlier in the season as well as breaking the meet record. She also won the 1500m with a time of 4:11.14, also breaking her own Princeton record. The time for the mile ranked 3rd all-time in Ivy League history. She finished second in the mile run at the 2025 NCAA Indoor Championships in Virginia Beach on 15 March.

She qualified for the final of the 1500 metres at the 2025 NCAA Outdoor Championships in Eugene, Oregon in June 2025. The following month, she was named in the British team for 1500 metres at the 2025 European Athletics U23 Championships in Bergen, Norway, reaching the final and placing fourth overall on her international debut.

Scatchard had a top-ten finish in the women's cross country at the NCAA West regional in Sacramento, California, to help the Stanford Cardinals to win the team title, in November 2025. In April, Scatchard ran a 4:26.65 anchor for Stanford as they went under the previous NCAA distance medley relay record but placed second behind North Carolina at the 2026 Penn Relays. In June, she qualified for the 2026 NCAA Outdoor Championships. The following month, she competed for Scotland in the 800 metres at the 2026 Commonwealth Games in Glasgow, Scotland.

== Personal life ==
Her sister Marnie is a field hockey player. Their mother, Brenda, is a former PE teacher.
