= Ludovica Cavalli =

Italian middle-distance runner

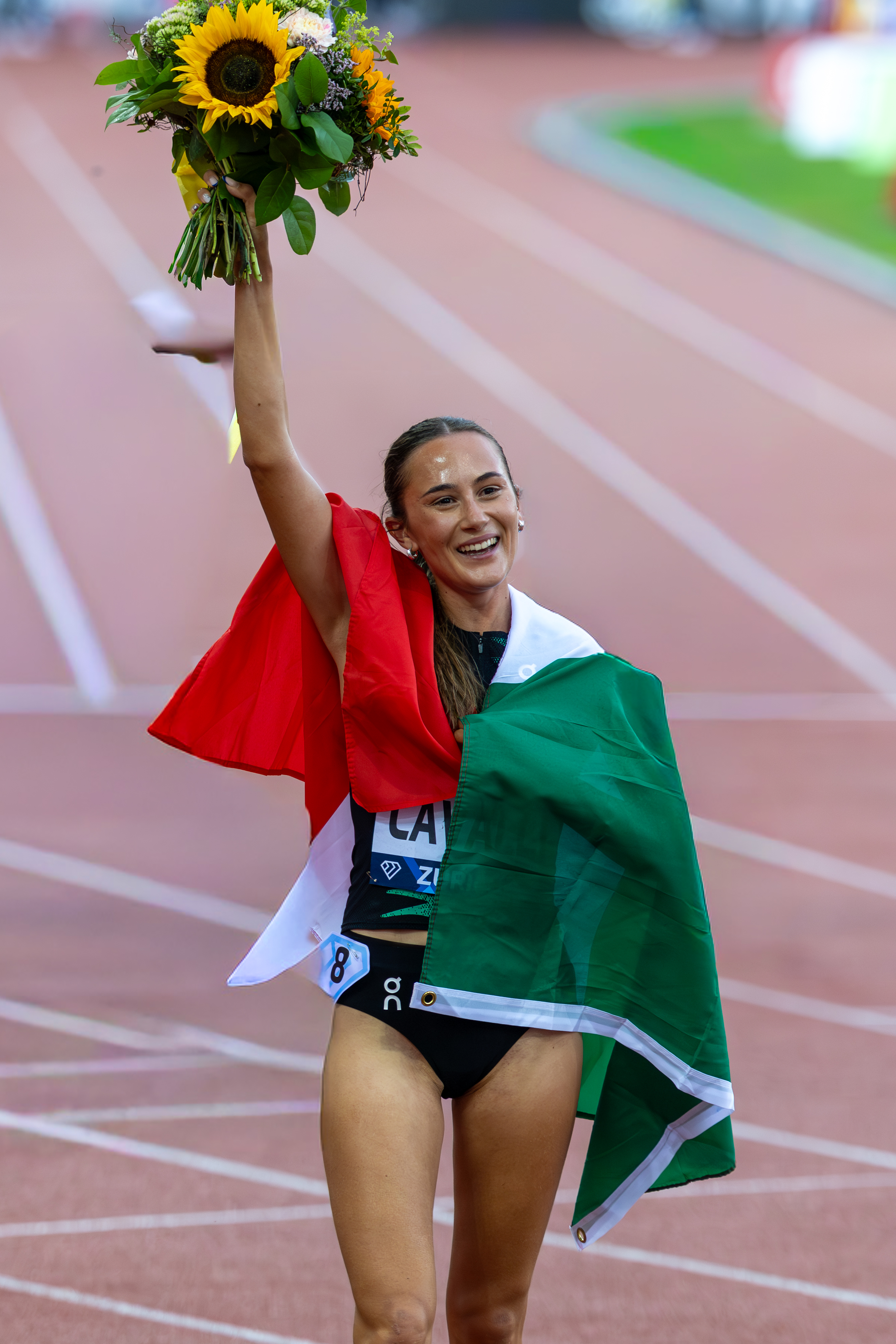
- Ludovica Cavalli wins the 1500 meter race at the 2026 Wanda Diamond League’s Weltklasse Zürich athletics competition.

Personal information
- National team: Italy: 2 caps (2021)
- Born: 20 December 2000 (age 25) Genoa, Italy
- Height: 1.65 m (5 ft 5 in)
- Weight: 48 kg (106 lb)

Sport
- Sport: Athletics
- Events: Middle-distance running; Cross-country running; Steeplechase
- Club: Bracco Atletica (2018-2021); Aeronautica Militare (2021-)
- Coached by: Liberato Pellecchia

Achievements and titles
- Personal bests: 1500: 4:01.84 (2023); 3000 m: 8:44.40 (2023)
Medal record
Mediterranean Games
Bronze medal – third place	2022 Oran	1500 metres
European Cross Country Championships
Gold medal – first place	2024 Antalya	Team race
Gold medal – first place	2021 Dublin	U-23 team
Silver medal – second place	2019 Lisbon	U-20 team

Ludovica Cavalli (born 20 December 2000) is an Italian athlete who specialises in middle-distance running. She competed in the women's 3000 metres event at the 2021 European Athletics Indoor Championships.

== Career ==
Cavalli finished in sixth place at the 2019 European U-20 Championships in the 3000 meter steeplechase. In 2019 she won the team silver medal in the European cross championships 2019 in Lisbon. Two years later in Dublin she won a gold medal, again with the team at the European cross championships, this time in the upper category for the under-23s.

In 2022, Cavalli won three senior Italian titles: in the cross-country short race, indoor in the 3000 m and outdoor in the 1500 m. She subsequently gained her second call up in the Italy national athletics team at the Mediterranean Games in Oran where she won the bronze medal in the 1500 m.

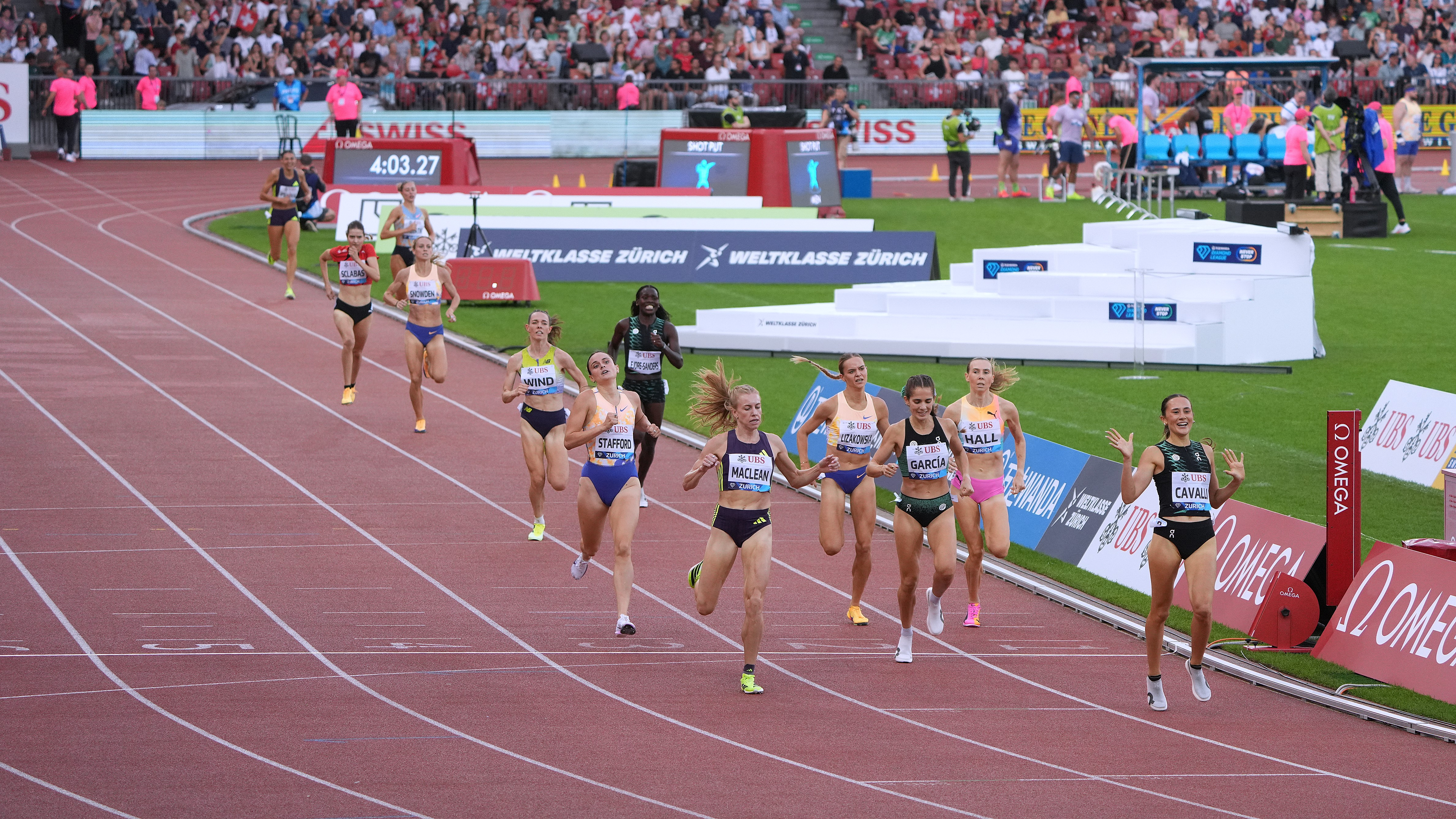
Ludovica Cavalli wins in Zurich 2026.

On 27 August 2026, Ludovica Cavalli wins the women’s 1500 m at Weltklasse Zürich in 4:03.27. Heather MacLean (USA) takes second in 4:03.57, Marta García (ESP) third in 4:03.86.

== Achievements ==
Year	Competition	Venue	Rank	Event	Mark	Notes
2018	World U20 Championships	(Finland) Tampere	24th (heats)	3000 m steeplechase	10:24.41	PB
2019	European Cross Country Championships	(Portugal) Lisbon	2nd	U20 team	28 pts	
2021	European Indoor Championships	(Poland) Toruń	20th (heats)	3000 m	9:14.85	
2021	European Cross Country Championships	(Republic of Ireland) Dublin	36th	U23 race		
2021	European Cross Country Championships	(Republic of Ireland) Dublin	1st	U23 team	18 pts	
2022	Mediterranean Games	(Algeria) Oran	3rd	1500 m	4:13.37	
2023	European Indoor Championships	(Turkey) Istanbul	9th	3000 m	8:53.97	

== National titles ==
Cavalli has won six national championships at individual senior level.

- Italian Athletics Championships
  - 1500 m: 2022
- Italian Athletics Indoor Championships
  - 1500 m: 2023
  - 3000 m: 2022, 2023
- Italian Cross Country Championships
  - Short course: 2022, 2023
