= Klaudia Kazimierska =

Polish athlete (born 2001)

Personal information
- Nationality: Poland
- Born: 3 September 2001 (age 25) Włocławek, Poland

Sport
- Sport: Athletics
- Event: Middle distance running
- College team: Oregon Ducks

Achievements and titles
- Personal bests: 800 m: 1:58.11 (Berlin, 2026); 1500 m: 3:54.05 (Brussels, 2026) NR Mile: 4:17.90 (Eugene, 2026) NR Indoor 800 m: 2:03.46 (Fayetteville, 2024) 1500 m: 4:01.78 (Boston, 2026) NR Mile: 4:30.65 (Boston, 2024)
Medal record
Women's athletics
Representing Poland
World Ultimate Championship
First place	2026 Budapest	1500 m
Diamond League
Gold medal – first place	2026 Brussels	1500 m
European Championships
Silver medal – second place	2026 Birmingham	1500 m

Klaudia Kazimierska (Polish: [ˈklaudja kaʑiˈmjɛrska]; born 3 September 2001) is a Polish track and field athlete who competes as a middle-distance runner. The national record holder over 1500 metres, she won the silver medal in the 1500 m at the 2026 European Athletics Championships, also setting new Polish national records in the mile run and the 1500 metres indoors that year. She also won the 2026 Diamond League title in the 1500 meters.

== Early life ==
Kazimierska is from Włocławek, Poland. She began to compete collegiately for the Oregon Ducks in the United States, from 2022.

== Career ==
In 2017, Kazimerska won the silver medal in the 1500 metres at the European Youth Olympic Festival in Győr, Hungary, with a time of 4:23.17. The following year, she was a bronze medalist at the 2018 European Athletics U18 Championships in the 1500 metres, held at the same venue in Hungary, running a time of 4:22.90.

In June 2024, she placed third overall at the 2024 NCAA Division I Outdoor Track and Field Championships in Eugene, Oregon, running a time of 4:08.22 to finish behind winner Maia Ramsden and second place runner Kimberley May. Later that month, she won the Polish Athletics Championships 1500 metres national title with a time of 4:10.29 in Bydgoszcz. She qualified for the 1500 metres race at the 2024 Summer Olympics in Paris, France, in August 2024, with a best time in 2024 of 4:01.89. She finished in tenth place overall in the final, with a new personal best time of 4:00.12.

In October 2024, Kazimierska signed an NIL deal with Nike alongside fellow Oregon teammates Matti Erickson and Maddy Elmore.

She missed the 2025 indoor season with a hip injury, but returned to action in April 2025 at the Oregon Team Invitational held at Hayward Field, winning both the 800 metres and 1500 metres races at the meet. She qualified for the final of the 1500 metres at the 2025 NCAA Outdoor Championships in Eugene, Oregon in June 2025. She competed for Poland in the 1500 metres at the 2025 European Athletics Team Championships First Division in Madrid on 29 June 2025. In September 2025, she was a finalist over 1500 metres at the 2025 World Championships in Tokyo, Japan, placing seventh in a personal best time of 3:57.95.

On 24 January 2026, Kazimierska ran a Polish short track record of 4:01.78 at the Indoor Grand Prix, in Boston.

On 1 February 2026, Kazimierska finished third in the Wanamaker Mile at the Millrose Games in New York, with her time of 4:21.36 setting a national record for Poland. She placed sixth in the final of the 1500 m at the 2026 World Athletics Indoor Championships in Toruń, Poland. On 4 July, she ran a new Polish national record of 4:17.90 in the mile run at the 2026 Prefontaine Classic. On 16 August, she won the silver medal behind Georgia Hunter Bell in the 1500 metres at the 2026 European Athletics Championships in Birmingham. On 23 August, she ran 3:55.59, setting a new national record, in the 1500 metres in the Diamond League at the 2026 Kamila Skolimowska Memorial in Silesia, Poland.

On 5 September 2026, Kazimierska won the final Diamond League event in Brussels setting a new world lead, meet record and national record of 3:54.05. She secured the overall 2026 Diamond League title in the 1500 meters event becoming the first Polish female athlete to accomplish this. On 12 September, she finished in 3:57.55 to win the inaugural World Ultimate Championship in Budapest ahead of European champion Georgia Hunter Bell. On 18 September 2026, Kazimierska participated at the Athlos London 2026, a professional, female-only track and field meeting, winning the mile run by achieving 4:19.43 ahead of Georgia Hunter Bell. On 13 October 2026, she was named the European Athlete of the Month for September in recognition of her outstanding results at the end of the 2026 season.

== Achievements ==
Information from her World Athletics profile unless otherwise noted.

=== Personal bests ===
Type	Distance	Time (s)	Venue	Date	Notes
Individual events
Indoor	800 metres sh	2:00.02	Boston, United States	22 February 2026	
Indoor	1500 metres sh	4:01.78	Boston, United States	24 January 2026	NR
Indoor	Mile sh	4:21.36	New York, United States	1 February 2026	NR
Indoor	2000 metres sh	5:52.26	Toruń, Poland	23 January 2021	
Outdoor	800 metres	1:58.11	Berlin, Germany	30 August 2026	
Outdoor	1000 metres	2:39.05	Wałcz, Poland	10 August 2022	
Outdoor	1500 metres	3:54:05	Brussels, Belgium	5 September 2026	NR
Outdoor	Mile	4:17.90	Eugene, United States	4 July 2026	NR
Team events
Outdoor	4 × 800 metres relay	8:30.12	Des Moines, United States	25 April 2025	

=== International competitions ===
Representing Poland
Year	Competition	Venue	Position	Event	Time	Notes
2017	European Youth Olympic Festival	Győr, Hungary	2nd	1500 m	4:23.17	
2018	European U18 Championships	Győr, Hungary	3rd	1500 m	4:22.90	
2018	Youth Olympic Games	Buenos Aires, Argentina	10th (h)	1500 m	4:34.22	
2019	European U20 Championships	Borås, Sweden	5th	1500 m	4:29.83	
2019	European Cross Country Championships	Lisbon, Portugal	64th	4000 m U20 Race	15:53	
2021	European Indoor Championships	Toruń, Poland	19th (h)	1500 m	4:18.24	
2021	European U23 Championships	Tallinn, Estonia	7th	1500 m	4:17.47	
2023	European U23 Championships	Espoo, Finland	4th	1500 m	4:10.71	
2024	Olympic Games	Paris, France	10th	1500 m	4:00.12	PB
2025	European Team Championships First Division	Madrid, Spain	4th	1500 m	4:09.70	
2025	World Championships	Tokyo, Japan	7th	1500 m	3:57.95	PB
2026	World Indoor Championships	Toruń, Poland	6th	1500 m	4:02.80	
2026	European Championships	Birmingham, United Kingdom	2nd	1500 m	4:08.80	
2026	World Ultimate Championship	Budapest, Hungary	1st	1500 m	3:57.55	

=== National championships and competitions ===
Year	Competition	Venue	Position	Event	Time	Notes
2017	Polish U18 Championships	Warsaw	1st	1500 m	4:29.52	
2018	Polish Championships	Lublin	7th	1500 m	4:23.44	
2018	Polish U18 Championships	Chorzów	1st	1500 m	4:31.65	
2019	Polish U20 Indoor Championships	Toruń	1st	3000 m sh	10:01.99	
2019	Polish U20 Championships	Racibórz	1st	1500 m	4:25.63	
2020	Polish Championships	Włocławek	2nd	1500 m	4:18.25	
2020	Polish U20 Championships	Radom	1st	1500 m	4:31.17	
2020	Polish U20 Championships	Radom	1st	3000 m	9:51.93	
2021	Polish Indoor Championships	Toruń	2nd	1500 m sh	4:24.33	
2021	Polish Championships	Poznań	5th	1500 m	4:15.23	
2021	Polish U23 Championships	Suwałki	1st	800 m	2:04.78	
2021	Polish U23 Championships	Suwałki	1st	1500 m	4:27.82	
2022	Polish Indoor Championships	Toruń	7th	1500 m sh	4:26.97	
2022	Polish Indoor Championships	Toruń	4th	3000 m sh	9:14.01	
2022	Polish Championships	Suwałki	5th	1500 m	4:33.80	
2022	Polish U23 Championships	Poznań	1st	800 m	2:07.35	
2022	Polish U23 Championships	Poznań	1st	1500 m	4:23.71	
2023	Polish U23 Championships	Włocławek	1st	800 m	2:06.35	
2023	Polish U23 Championships	Włocławek	1st	1500 m	4:29.48	
2024	Polish Championships	Bydgoszcz	1st	1500 m	4:10.96	
2025	Polish Championships	Bydgoszcz	1st	1500 m	4:21.92	
2026	Polish Championships	Białystok	1st	800 m	1:58.97	
2026	Polish Championships	Białystok	1st	1500 m	4:06.88	
