= Jasmijn Lau =

Dutch athletics competitor

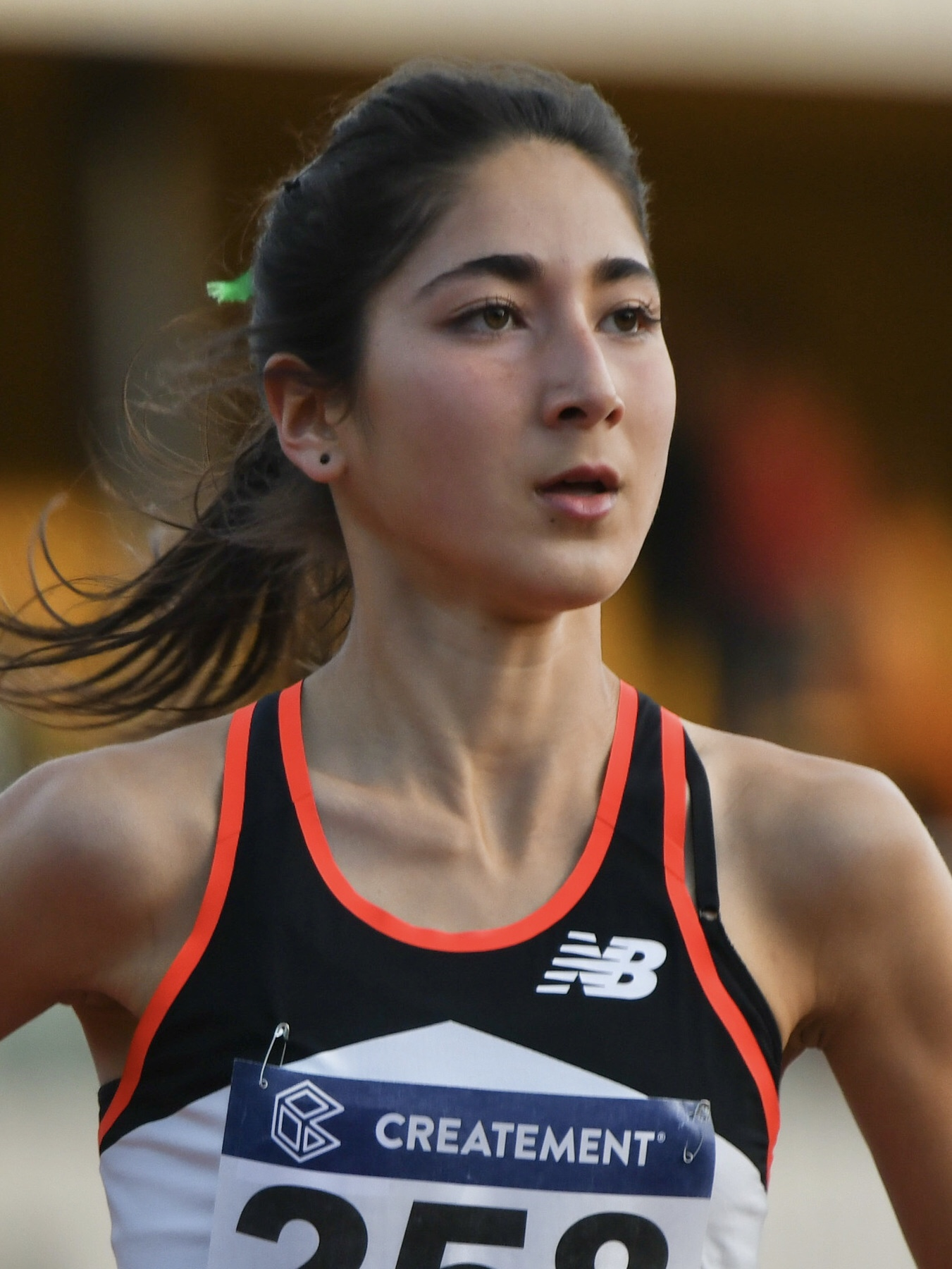
- Lau in 2018

Personal information
- Born: 11 March 1999 (age 27)

Sport
- Country: Netherlands
- Sport: Athletics

Jasmijn Lau (born 11 March 1999) is a Dutch track & field athlete. Lau represents the Netherlands at international competitions.

Lau was a multiple times national champion in the 10000 metres. She became under-23 European Champion at the 2021 European Athletics U23 Championships in the 10000 metres event. After a long injury she competed at the 2022 European Athletics Championships in the 10,000 metres event.
