= Delia Sclabas =

Swiss middle-distance runner

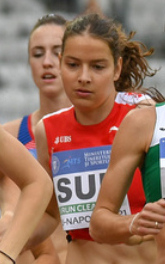
- 2021 European Team Championships

Personal information
- Nationality: Swiss
- Born: 8 November 2000 (age 25)

Sport
- Sport: Athletics
- Event: 800 metres

Delia Sclabas (born 8 November 2000) is a Swiss athlete. She competed in the women's 800 metres event at the 2020 Summer Olympics.
