= Germany at the 2022 European Athletics Championships =

- Flag of Germany
- WA code: GER
- National federation: German Athletics Association

in Munich, Germany 15−21 August
- Competitors: 119 (60 men and 59 women)
- Medals Ranked 1st: Gold 7 Silver 7 Bronze 2 Total 16

European Athletics Championships appearances (overview)
- 1934; 1938; 1946–1950; 1954; 1958; 1962; 1966–1990; 1994; 1998; 2002; 2006; 2010; 2012; 2014; 2016; 2018; 2022; 2024

Germany competed at the 2022 European Athletics Championships in Munich, Germany, between 15 and 21 August 2022

== Medallists ==
Medal	Name	Event	Date
Gold	Miriam Dattke; Kristina Hendel; Domenika Mayer; Deborah Schöneborn; Rabea Schöneborn; Katharina Steinruck	Women's marathon team	15 August
Gold	Richard Ringer	Men's marathon	15 August
Gold	Niklas Kaul	Men's decathlon	16 August
Gold	Gina Lückenkemper	Women's 100 metres	16 August
Gold	Konstanze Klosterhalfen	Women's 5000 metres	18 August
Gold	Julian Weber	Men's javelin throw	21 August
Gold	Alexandra Burghardt; Rebekka Haase; Gina Lückenkemper; Lisa Mayer; Jessica-Bianca Wessolly	Women's 4 × 100 metres relay	21 August
Silver	Simon Boch; Johannes Motschmann; Amanal Petros; Hendrik Pfeiffer; Richard Ringer; Konstantin Wedel	Men's marathon team	15 August
Silver	Christopher Linke	Men's 35 kilometres walk	16 August
Silver	Kristin Pudenz	Women's discus throw	16 August
Silver	Tobias Potye	Men's high jump	18 August
Silver	Malaika Mihambo	Women's long jump	18 August
Silver	Bo Kanda Lita Baehre	Men's pole vault	20 August
Silver	Lea Meyer	Women's 3000 metres steeplechase	20 August
Bronze	Claudine Vita	Women's discus throw	16 August
Bronze	Saskia Feige	Women's 20 kilometres walk	20 August

== Results ==
Germany entered the following athletes.

Key

- Q = Qualified for the next round
- q = Qualified for the next round as a fastest loser or, in field events, by position without achieving the qualifying target
- NR = National record
- PB = Personal best
- SB = Season best
- N/A = Round not applicable for the event

=== Men ===
Track and road events

Athlete	Event	Heat		Semifinal		Final	
Athlete	Event	Result	Rank	Result	Rank	Result	Rank
Owen Ansah	100 metres	Bye		10.20	10	did not advance	
Lucas Ansah-Peprah	100 metres	Bye		10.19	9	did not advance	
Julian Wagner	100 metres	Bye		10.21	13	did not advance	
Owen Ansah	200 metres	Bye		20.48	12	did not advance	
Robin Erewa	200 metres	21.12	21	did not advance			
Joshua Hartmann	200 metres	Bye		20.33 PB	4 Q	20.50	5
Manuel Sanders	400 metres	46.19	19	did not advance			
Marvin Schlegel	400 metres	46.21	20	did not advance			
Patrick Schneider	400 metres	45.58	6 Q	45.92	15	did not advance	
Christoph Kessler	800 metres	1:47.72	17	did not advance			
Marc Reuther	800 metres	1:48.33	28	did not advance			
Christoph Kessler	1500 metres	3:39.32	13	—		did not advance	
Mohamed Mohumed	1500 metres	3:45.53	26	—		did not advance	
Davor Aaron Bienenfeld	5000 metres	—				13:45.70	20
Sam Parsons	5000 metres	—				13:30.38	6
Filimon Abraham	10,000 metres	—				28:53.54	19
Samuel Fitwi Sibhatu	10,000 metres	—				28:03.92 PB	9
Nils Voigt	10,000 metres	—				28:02.19	8
Simon Boch	Marathon	—				2:21:39 SB	50
Johannes Motschmann	Marathon	—				2:14:52 SB	15
Amanal Petros	Marathon	—				2:10:39 SB	4
Hendrik Pfeiffer	Marathon	—				2:16:04	24
Richard Ringer	Marathon	—				2:10:21 SB	1st place, gold medalist(s)
Konstantin Wedel	Marathon	—				2:16:09	25
Simon Boch; Johannes Motschmann; Amanal Petros; Hendrik Pfeiffer; Richard Ringer; Konstantin Wedel	Marathon team	—				6:35:52	2nd place, silver medalist(s)
Gregor Traber	110 metres hurdles	13.69	3 Q	13.72	16	did not advance	
Joshua Abuaku	400 metres hurdles	Bye		49.05	5 Q	48.79 PB	5
Constantin Preis	400 metres hurdles	49.63 SB	6 Q	49.55 SB	15	did not advance	
Karl Bebendorf	3000 metres steeplechase	8:31.67	4 Q	—		8:26.49	5
Niklas Buchholz	3000 metres steeplechase	8:33.89	12 q	—		8:37.51	14
Frederik Ruppert	3000 metres steeplechase	9:01.93	28	—		did not advance	
Nils Brembach	20 kilometres walk	—				DQ	
Karl Junghannß	20 kilometres walk	—				1:28:21	20
Leo Köpp	20 kilometres walk	—				1:21:36 SB	9
Carl Dohmann	35 kilometres walk	—				2:36:52	8
Jonathan Hilbert	35 kilometres walk	—				2:32:44 PB	5
Christopher Linke	35 kilometres walk	—				2:29:30 PB	2nd place, silver medalist(s)
Owen Ansah; Lucas Ansah-Peprah; Joshua Hartmann; Kevin Kranz	4 × 100 metres relay	37.97 NR	1 Q	—		DNF	
Marc Koch; Manuel Sanders; Marvin Schlegel; Patrick Schneider	4 × 400 metres relay	3:01.80 SB	3 Q	—		3:02.51	7

Field events

Athlete	Event	Qualification		Final	
Athlete	Event	Distance	Position	Distance	Position
Tobias Potye	High jump	2.21	1 q	2.27	2nd place, silver medalist(s)
Mateusz Przybylko	High jump	2.21	7 q	2.23	6
Jonas Wagner	High jump	2.21	5 q	NM	
Torben Blech	Pole vault	5.65	5 q	5.50	8
Bo Kanda Lita Baehre	Pole vault	5.65	1 q	5.85	2nd place, silver medalist(s)
Oleg Zernikel	Pole vault	5.65	1 q	5.50	9
Maximilian Entholzner	Long jump	5.63	21	did not advance	
Fabian Heinle	Long jump	7.64	15	did not advance	
Simon Bayer	Shot put	19.91	12 q	19.83	11
Torben Brandt	Discus throw	56.33	24	did not advance	
Henrik Janssen	Discus throw	62.60	7 q	61.11	10
Martin Wierig	Discus throw	DNS			
Andreas Hofmann	Javelin throw	77.29	11 q	74.75	11
Thomas Röhler	Javelin throw	71.31	22	did not advance	
Julian Weber	Javelin throw	80.99	2 q	87.66	1st place, gold medalist(s)

Combined events – Decathlon

Athlete	Event	100 m	LJ	SP	HJ	400 m	110H	DT	PV	JT	1500 m	Final	Rank
Arthur Abele	Result	11.24	7.01	15.06 SB	1.81	50.37	14.50	42.38	4.50 SB	60.98 SB	4:40.94 SB	7662 SB	15
Arthur Abele	Points	808	816	793	636	798	911	713	760	753	674	7662 SB	15
Niklas Kaul	Result	11.16 PB	7.10	14.90 SB	2.02	47.87 PB	14.45	41.80	4.90	76.05 CB	4:10.04 PB	8545 SB	1st place, gold medalist(s)
Niklas Kaul	Points	825	838	784	822	915	917	701	880	982	881	8545 SB	1st place, gold medalist(s)
Kai Kazmirek	Result	11.15	7.25	14.09	2.02	48.24 SB	14.42	45.18	5.00 =SB	61.23	4:46.82	8151	8
Kai Kazmirek	Points	827	874	734	822	898	921	771	910	756	638	8151	8
Tim Nowak	Result	11.51	6.97	14.27	2.08 PB	DNS	DNF						
Tim Nowak	Points	750	807	745	878	DNS	DNF						

=== Women ===
Track and road events

Athlete	Event	Heat		Semifinal		Final	
Athlete	Event	Result	Rank	Result	Rank	Result	Rank
Rebekka Haase	100 metres	11.50	13 Q	11.52	18	did not advance	
Gina Lückenkemper	100 metres	Bye		11.11	3 Q	10.99 =SB	1st place, gold medalist(s)
Tatjana Pinto	100 metres	11.43	5 Q	11.55	21	did not advance	
Alexandra Burghardt	200 metres	23.16	8 Q	23.05	6 q	23.24	8
Corinna Schwab	200 metres	Bye		23.44	15	did not advance	
Jessica-Bianca Wessolly	200 metres	23.14 SB	7 Q	23.47	17	did not advance	
Alica Schmidt	400 metres	52.52	12 Q	53.12	23	did not advance	
Corinna Schwab	400 metres	Bye		52.70	21	did not advance	
Christina Hering	800 metres	2:03.00	15 Q	2:00.86	5 q	2:00.82	7
Majtie Kolberg	800 metres	2:02.52	9 q	2:01.20 SB	9	did not advance	
Tanja Spill	800 metres	2:04.60	27	did not advance			
Hanna Klein	1500 metres	4:03.46 SB	3 Q	—		4:05.49	5
Katharina Trost	1500 metres	4:07.20	13 Q	—		4:06.95	10
Sara Benfarès	5000 metres	—				15:20.94 PB	11
Konstanze Klosterhalfen	5000 metres	—				14:50.47	1st place, gold medalist(s)
Alina Reh	5000 metres	—				DNF	
Konstanze Klosterhalfen	10,000 metres	—				31:05.21	4
Alina Reh	10,000 metres	—				32:14.02	8
Miriam Dattke	Marathon	—				2:28:52	4
Domenika Meyer	Marathon	—				2:29:21	6
Kristina Hendel	Marathon	—				2:35:14	20
Deborah Schöneborn	Marathon	—				2:30:35	10
Rabea Schöneborn	Marathon	—				2:31:36	12
Katharina Steinruck	Marathon	—				2:32:41 SB	15
Miriam Dattke; Kristina Hendel; Domenika Meyer; Deborah Schöneborn; Rabea Schöneborn; Katharina Steinruck	Marathon team	—				7:28:48	1st place, gold medalist(s)
Monika Zapalska	100 metres hurdles	13.39	12	did not advance			
Eileen Demes	400 metres hurdles	57.11	17	did not advance			
Carolina Krafzik	400 metres hurdles	54.32 PB	1 Q	55.29	8 Q	56.02	8
Gisèle Wender	400 metres hurdles	57.09	15	did not advance			
Elena Burkard	3000 metres steeplechase	9:43.97	11 q	—		9:39.63 SB	12
Olivia Gürth	3000 metres steeplechase	9:50.95	16	—		did not advance	
Lea Meyer	3000 metres steeplechase	9:39.55	5 Q	—		9:15.35 PB	2nd place, silver medalist(s)
Saskia Feige	20 kilometres walk	—				1:29:25 PB	3rd place, bronze medalist(s)
Katrin Schusters	35 kilometres walk	—				3:18:38	17
Alexandra Burghardt; Rebekka Haase; Gina Lückenkemper; Lisa Mayer; Jessica-Bianca Wessolly (*)	4 × 100 metres relay	43.33	5 Q	—		42.34	1st place, gold medalist(s)
Carolina Krafzik; Mona Mayer; Alica Schmidt; Luna Thiel; Jessica-Bianca Wessolly (*)	4 × 400 metres relay	3:27.92	8 q	—		3:26.09 SB	5

Field events

Athlete	Event	Qualification		Final	
Athlete	Event	Distance	Position	Distance	Position
Marie-Laurence Jungfleisch	High jump	1.87	1 q	1.90 SB	6
Bianca Stichling	High jump	1.83	18	did not advance	
Anjuli Knäsche	Pole vault	4.40	14	did not advance	
Jacqueline Otchere	Pole vault	4.10	23	did not advance	
Mikaelle Assani	Long jump	6.46	13	did not advance	
Merle Homeier	Long jump	6.49	12 q	6.42	9
Maryse Luzolo	Long jump	6.28	18	did not advance	
Malaika Mihambo	Long jump	6.99	1 Q	7.03	2nd place, silver medalist(s)
Neele Eckhardt-Noack	Triple jump	14.53 PB	1 Q	14.45	4
Kristin Gierisch	Triple jump	13.59	16	did not advance	
Jessie Maduka	Triple jump	12.11	22	did not advance	
Sara Gambetta	Shot put	18.53	5 q	18.48	5
Katharina Maisch	Shot put	18.65	3 Q	18.01	8
Julia Ritter	Shot put	17.80	7 q	18.29	6
Shanice Craft	Discus throw	62.64	5 q	62.78	7
Kristin Pudenz	Discus throw	64.25	3 Q	67.87 PB	2nd place, silver medalist(s)
Claudine Vita	Discus throw	63.51	4 Q	65.20 SB	3rd place, bronze medalist(s)
Annika Marie Fuchs	Javelin throw	59.90	6 q	54.52	11
Jana Marie Lowka	Javelin throw	52.98	21	did not advance	
Lea Wipper	Javelin throw	55.07	17	did not advance	
Samantha Borutta	Hammer throw	67.40	15	did not advance	

Combined events – Heptathlon

Athlete	Event	100H	HJ	SP	200 m	LJ	JT	800 m	Final	Rank
Carolin Schäfer	Result	13.39 SB	1.74 SB	13.68	24.16 SB	5.82	50.18 SB	2:17.55	6223 SB	6
Carolin Schäfer	Points	1066	903	773	965	795	864	857	6223 SB	6
Sophie Weißenberg	Result	13.72	1.80 =SB	13.26	24.16	6.35	46.73	DNS	DNF	
Sophie Weißenberg	Points	1018	978	745	965	959	797	DNS	DNF	
