= 2019 German Athletics Championships =

- Edition: 119th
- Start date: 3 August 2019
- End date: 4 August 2019
- Host city: Berlin
- Venue: Olympiastadion
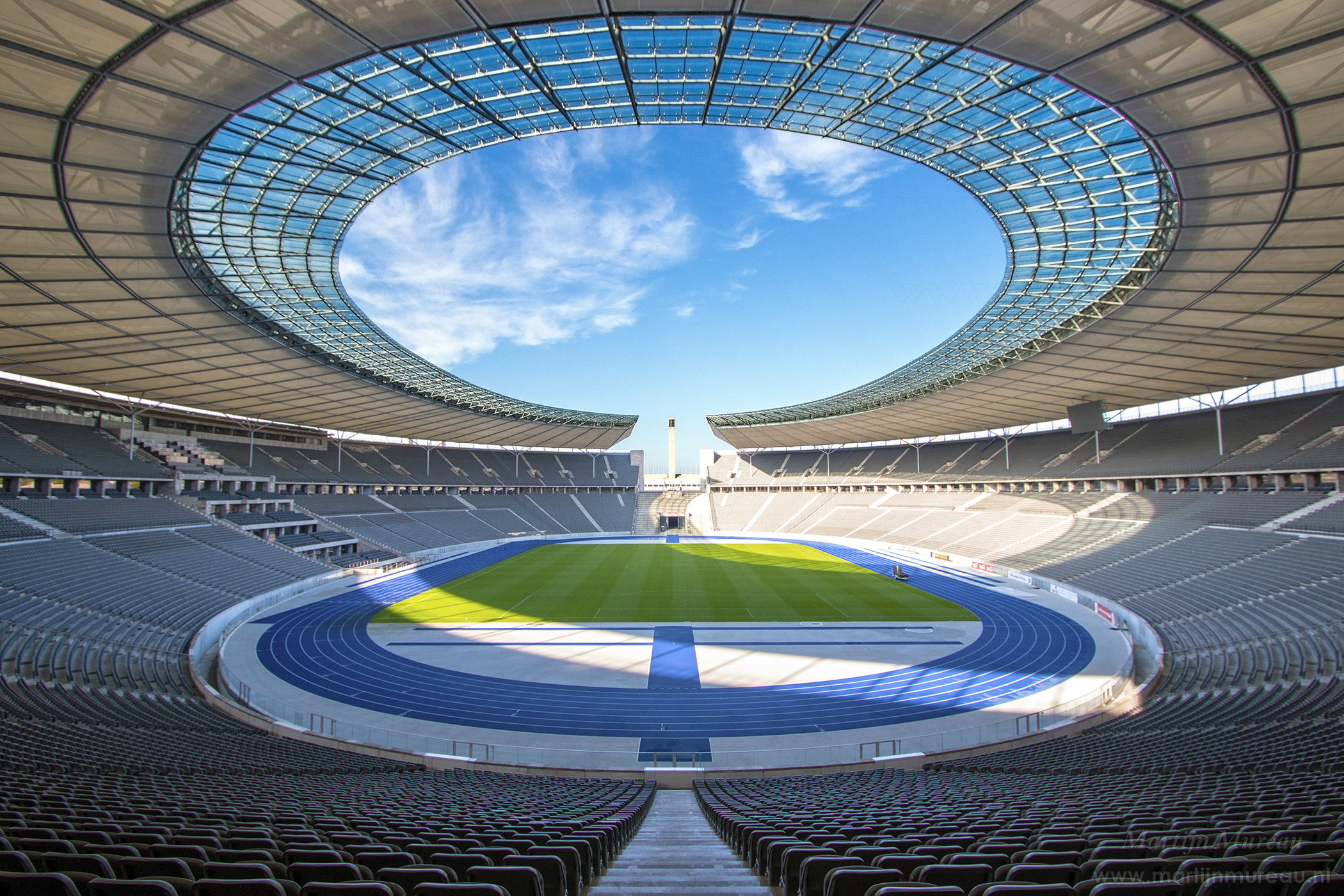
- Events: 38 (+42)

The 2019 German Athletics Championships was the 119th edition of the national championship in outdoor track and field for Germany. It was held on 3 and 4 August at the Olympiastadion in Berlin. It served as the selection meeting for Germany at the 2019 World Championships in Athletics.

== Championships ==
As usual, due to time or organizational reasons, various competitions were not held as part of the main event in Berlin. These include championships for the 50 km road race, ultra trail and 24-hour race, which were previously organised by the German Ultramarathon Association (DUV) and now organised by the German Athletics Federation (DLV). For the first time, the 4 × 400 m relays were contested separately. The annual national championships in Germany comprised the following competitions:

Event	Venue	Date(s)	Notes
Cross country running	Ingolstadt	9 March	
50K run	Grünheide	30 March	
Half marathon	Freiburg im Breisgau	7 April	
20 kilometres race walk	Naumburg	13 April	
Marathon	Düsseldorf	28 April	incorporated into the Düsseldorf Marathon
10,000 metres	Essen-Stoppenberg	8 June	
Ultratrail	Reichweiler	8 June	incorporated into the Keufelskopf Ultra-Trail
4 × 400 metres relay	Wetzlar	16 June	incorporated into the German U23 Athletics Championships
Relays; Women's 3 × 800 m Men's 3 × 1000 m	Ulm	28 July	incorporated into the German Youth Athletics Championships
Combined track and field events Women's heptathlon Men's decathlon	Bietigheim-Bissingen	10–11 August	
Track racewalking Women's 5000 m Men's 10,000 m	Beeskow	17 August	
24-hour run	Bottrop	24 August	
10K run	Siegburg	15 September	
100K run	Kandel	21 September	
Mountain running	Breitungen	22 September	
50 kilometres race walk	?	October	

== Results ==
=== Men ===
Event	Gold		Silver		Bronze	
100 metres	Michael Pohl; Sprintteam Wetzlar	10.27 s	Kevin Kranz; Sprintteam Wetzlar	10.29 s	Julian Reus; Erfurter LAC	10.30 s
200 metres	Steven Müller; LG ovag Friedberg-Fauerbach	20.63 s	Patrick Domogala; MTG Mannheim	20.77 s	Elias Goer; Sprintteam Wetzlar	20.88 s
400 metres	Manuel Sanders; LG Olympia Dortmund	45.86 s	Marvin Schlegel; LAC Erdgas Chemnitz	46.12 s	Tobias Lange; TSV Bayer 04 Leverkusen	46.27 s
800 metres	Marc Reuther; LG Eintracht Frankfurt	1:47.22 min	Robert Farken; SC DHfK Leipzig	1:47.48 min	Benedikt Huber; LG Telis Finanz Regensburg	1:48.01 min
1500 metres	Amos Bartelsmeyer; LG Eintracht Frankfurt	3:56.34 min	Marc Tortell; TV Rendel	3:56.76 min	Jens Mergenthaler; SV Winnenden	3:56.81 min
5000 metres	Richard Ringer; LC Rehlingen	14:01.69 min	Sam Parsons; LG Eintracht Frankfurt	14:02.38 min	Amanal Petros; TV Wattenscheid	14:02.99 min
10,000 metres	Richard Ringer; LC Rehlingen	28:28.89 min	Sebastian Hendel; LG Vogtland	28:43.67 min	Simon Boch; LG Telis Finanz Regensburg	28:45.34 min
Half marathon	Moritz Beinlich; LG Telis Finanz Regensburg	1:04:25 h	Dominik Notz; LG Telis Finanz Regensburg	1:04:28 h	Simon Boch; LG Telis Finanz Regensburg	1:04:36 h
Half marathon team	LG Telis Finanz Regensburg I Moritz Beinlich; Dominik Notz; Simon Boch	3:13:26 h	LG Telis Finanz Regensburg II; Konstantin Wedel; Kevin Key; Tim Ramdane Cherif	3:17:48 h	LAV Stadtwerke Tübingen; Lorenz Baum; Michael Wörnle; Timo Göhler	3:26:11 h
Marathon	Tom Gröschel; TC FIKO Rostock	2:13:49 h	Simon Stützel; LG Region Karlsruhe	2:18:58 h	Tobias Schreindl; LG Passau	2:21:51 h
Marathon team	LG Passau; Tobias Schreindl; Maxim Fuchs; Stephan Fruhmann	7:23:57 h	LG Region Karlsruhe; Simon Stützel; Sebastian Pieczarek; Karsten Müller	7:24:08 h	LSF Münster; Sven Serke; Yannick Rinne; Simon von Martial	7:34:58 h
50K run	Marcel Bräutigam; GutsMuths-Rennsteiglaufverein	2:51:55 h	Benedikt Hoffmann; TSG 1845 Heilbronn	2:54:43 h	Florian Neuschwander; Spiridon Frankfurt	2:54:53 h
50K run team	LG Nord Berlin Ultrateam; Frank Merrbach; Alexander Dautel; Enrico Wiessner	9:21:56 h	LG Passau; Marco Bscheidl; Giovani Gonzalez Popoca; Alex Sellner	9:40:47 h	Laufgemeinschaft Würzburg; Florian Reus; Rainer Wilfried Koch; Marcus Wieser	10:55:05 h
110 m hurdles	Gregor Traber; LAV Stadtwerke Tübingen	13.68 s	Martin Vogel; SC DHfK Leipzig	13.88 s	Maximilian Bayer; MTV 1881 Ingolstadt	13.89 s
400 m hurdles	Constantin Preis; VfL Sindelfingen	49.32 s	Luke Campbell; LG Eintracht Frankfurt	49.56 s	Joshua Abuaku; LG Eintracht Frankfurt	49.75 s
3000 m s'chase	Karl Bebendorf; Dresdner SC	8:33.59 min	Martin Grau; Erfurter LAC	8:33.84 min	Patrick Karl; TV Ochsenfurth	8:38.39 min
4 × 100 m relay	SC DHfK Leipzig; Felix Straub; Niels Torben Giese; Roy Schmidt; Marvin Schulte	39.02 s	Sprintteam Wetzlar; Yanic Berthes; Kevin Kranz; Elias Goer; Michael Pohl	39.17 s	StG VfB Stuttgart; Philipp Corucle; Alexander Czysch; Moritz Riekert; Fabian Heinle	39.66 s
4 × 400 m relay	TSV Gräfelfing; Michael Adolf; Benedikt Wiesend; Arne Leppelsack; Johannes Trefz	3:09.10 min	VfL Sindelfingen; Yannik Frers; Yannic Krings; Leonard Baranski; Constantin Preis	3:13.51 min	StG Chemnitz Erzgebirge; Maximilian Grupen; Patrick Elger; Aurelio Maulana; Marvin Schlegel	3:13.81 min
3 × 1000 m relay	LG farbtex Nordschwarzwald; Denis Bäuerle; Hendrik Engel; Timo Benitz	7:13.67 min	LG Braunschweig; Max Dieterich; Viktor Kuk; Julius Lawnik	7:14.13 min	LSC Höchstadt/Aisch; Martin Weinländer; Niklas Buchholz; Adrian König-Rannenberg	7:18.12 min
10,000 m walk	Christopher Linke; SC Potsdam	38:57.94 min	Hagen Pohle; SC Potsdam	39:37.59 min	Nils Brembach; SC Potsdam	39:50.04 min
20 km walk	Nils Brembach; SC Potsdam	1:20:48 h	Christopher Linke; SC Potsdam	1:21:32 h	Hagen Pohle; SC Potsdam	1:23:00 h
20 km walk team	SC Potsdam; Nils Brembach; Christopher Linke; Hagen Pohle	4:05:20 h	LG Nord Berlin; Leo Köpp; Francesco-Marco Tommasino; Marcin Reumann	4:38:15 h	Alemannia Aachen; Malte Strunk; Timo Schusters; Peter Schumm	6:03:26 h
High jump	Mateusz Przybylko; TSV Bayer 04 Leverkusen	2.22 m	Falk Wendrich; LAZ Soest	2.19 m	Bastian Rudolf; Dresdner SC	2.10 m
Pole vault	Raphael Holzdeppe; LAZ Zweibrücken	5.76 m	Bo Kanda Lita Baehre; TSV Bayer 04 Leverkusen	5.71 m	Torben Blech; TSV Bayer 04 Leverkusen	5.51 m
Long jump	Fabian Heinle; VfB Stuttgart	8.05 m	Julian Howard; LG Region Karlsruhe	7.88 m	Maximilian Entholzner; 1. FC Passau	7.66 m
Triple jump	Max Heß; LAC Erdgas Chemnitz	16.50 m	Felix Wenzel; SC Potsdam	16.01 m	Felix Mairhofer; TSG Weinheim	15.31 m
Shot put	Simon Bayer; VfL Sindelfingen	20.26 m	Tobias Dahm; VfL Sindelfingen	19.87 m	David Storl; SC DHfK Leipzig	19.77 m
Discus throw	Martin Wierig; SC Magdeburg	65.39 m	David Wrobel; SC Magdeburg	63.87 m	Torben Brandt; SCC Berlin	62.59 m
Hammer throw	Tristan Schwandke; TV Hindelang	73.00 m	Simon Lang; LG Stadtwerke München	68.01 m	Johannes Bichler; LG Stadtwerke München	66.95 m
Javelin throw	Andreas Hofmann; MTG Mannheim	87.07 m	Julian Weber; USC Mainz	86.60 m	Thomas Röhler; LC Jena	82.70 m
Decathlon	Florian Obst; SSV Ulm 1846	7413 pts	Felix Hepperle; LG Neckar-Enz	7341 pts	Nico Beckers; Aachener TG	7317 pts
Decathlon team	TS Herzogenaurach; Christoph Lange; Marius Laib; André Zahl	20,137 pts	Only one finishing team			
Cross country short course 4.1 km	Richard Ringer; LC Rehlingen	12:33 min	Florian Orth; LG Telis Finanz Regensburg	12:42 min	Konstantin Wedel; LG Telis Finanz Regensburg	12:45 min
Cross country short course team	LG Telis Finanz Regensburg; Florian Orth; Konstantin Wedel; Simon Boch	9; 38:22 min	LG Region Karlsruhe; Jan Lukas Becker; Jannik Arbogast; Christoph Kessler	24; 39:27 min	LG farbtex Nordschwarzwald; Marco Kern; Hendrik Engel; Dominic Müller	34; 39:59 min
Cross country long course 10.1 km	Richard Ringer; LC Rehlingen	32:03 min	Amanal Petros; TV Wattenscheid	32:04 min	Samuel Fitwi Sibhatu; LG Vulkaneifel	32:13 min
Cross country long course team	LG Telis Finanz Regensburg; Philipp Pflieger; Tim Ramdane Cherif; Maximilian Zeus	23; 1:40:52 h	LG Braunschweig; Karsten Meier; Joseph Katib; Viktor Kuk	43; 1:43:14 h	LG Vulkaneifel; Samuel Fitwi Sibhatu; Yannik Duppich; Andreas Keil-Forneck	46; 1:42:24 h
Ultratrail; 78 km/3000 m height	André Collet; Aachener TG	7:16:29 h	Max Kirschbaum; LG Ohmbachsee	7:24:22 h	Martin Ahlburg; LG Nord Berlin Ultrateam	7:26:09 h
Ultratrail team	LG Allgäu; Thomas Miksch; Bernhard Munz; Bernhard Epple	26:06:36 h	LG Ultralauf I Jonathan Gakstatter; Eric Geidel; Andreas Weber	26:43:06 h	LG Ultralauf II; Alexander Klas; Hans-Dieter Jancker; Falk Sittner	28:09:41 h
24-hour run	Felix Weber sportTREND Braunschweig	247.218 km	Marcel Leuze; Turnerbund Hamburg Eilbeck	238.524 km	Marko Gränitz; Laufgemeinschaft Würzburg	225.874 km
24-hour run team	sportTREND Braunschweig; Felix Weber; Fabian Wolf; Thomas Sommer	605.926 km	LG Ultralauf I Ralf Gundermann; Jens Allerheiligen; Klaus Haake	592.277 km	LG Ultralauf II; Michael Bohm; Willi Klesen; Helmut Schöne	550.614 km

=== Women ===
Event	Gold		Silver		Bronze	
100 metres	Tatjana Pinto; LC Paderborn	11.09 s	Gina Lückenkemper; SCC Berlin	11.20 s	Malaika Mihambo; LG Kurpfalz	11.21 s
200 metres	Tatjana Pinto; LC Paderborn	22.65 s	Lisa-Marie Kwayie; Neuköllner Sportfreunde	22.88 s	Jessica-Bianca Wessolly; MTG Mannheim	23.14 s
400 metres	Luna Bulmahn; VfL Eintracht Hannover	52.37 s	Karolina Pahlitzsch; SV Preußen Berlin	52.87 s	Nelly Schmidt; LT DSHS Köln	53.21 s
800 metres	Christina Hering; LG Stadtwerke München	2:01.37 min	Katharina Trost; LG Stadtwerke München	2:01.68 min	Mareen Kalis; LG Stadtwerke München	2:04.81 min
1500 metres	Caterina Granz; LG Nord Berlin	4:08.91 min	Vera Coutellier; ASV Köln	4:13.35 min	Johanna Christine Schulz; SC Rönnau 74	4:13.47 min
5000 metres	Konstanze Klosterhalfen; TSV Bayer 04 Leverkusen	14:26.76 min NR	Alina Reh; SSV Ulm 1846	15:19.42 min	Miriam Dattke; LG Telis Finanz Regensburg	15:41.81 min
10,000 metres	Alina Reh; SSV Ulm 1846	31:19.87 min	Miriam Dattke; LG Telis Finanz Regensburg	32:50.10 min	Katharina Steinruck; LG Eintracht Frankfurt	33:35.18 min
Half marathon	Miriam Dattke; LG Telis Finanz Regensburg	1:11:56 h	Thea Heim; LG Telis Finanz Regensburg	1:13:59 h	Stefanie Doll; SV Kirchzarten	1:15:40 h
Half marathon team	LG Telis Finanz Regensburg I Miriam Dattke; Thea Heim; Marina Rappold	3:45:29 h	LG Telis Finanz Regensburg II; Mira Parisek; Eva Schien; Barbara Ferstl	4:13:04 h	TuS Deuz; Tina Schneider; Nina Caprice Löhr; Gabi Müller-Scherzant	4:14:24 h
Marathon	Anja Scherl; LG Telis Finanz Regensburg	2:32:56 h	Anna Hahner; SCC Berlin	2:36:09 h	Isabel Leibfried; TSG 1845 Heilbronn	2:39:35 h
Marathon team	LG Telis Finanz Regensburg; Anja Scherl; Monika Heiß; Eva Haberl	8:20:53 h	LAC Olympia 88 Berlin; Hanna Tempelhagen; Sandra Fiehn; Fabienne Lipus	9:03:28 h	SV Schlau.com Saar 05 Saarbrücken; Cornelia Thon; Susanne Trenz; Ann-Cathrine Jülch	9:48:06 h
50K run	Almut Dreßler; LG Nord Berlin Ultrateam	3:29:43 h	Nele Alder-Baerens; Ultrasportclub Marburg	3:30:08 h	Malin Pfäffle; Die Laufpartner	3:37:18 h
50K run team	Die Laufpartner; Malin Pfäffle; Julia Jezek; Christiane Neidiger	11:21:01 h	LG Nord Berlin Ultrateam; Almut Dreßler; Katrin Grigalat; Martina Prüfer	12:04:19 h	LG Ultralauf; Claudia Lederer; Katharina Bey; Eva Piehlmeier	13:20:18 h
100 m hurdles	Cindy Roleder; SV Halle	12.90 s	Neele Schuten; TV Gladbeck 1912	13.44 s	Ricarda Lobe; MTG Mannheim	13.45 s
400 m hurdles	Carolina Krafzik; VfL Sindelfingen	55.64 s	Jackie Baumann; LAV Stadtwerke Tübingen	56.26 s	Christine Salterberg; LT DSHS Köln	56.57 s
3000 m s'chase	Gesa Felicitas Krause; Silvesterlauf Trier	9:28.45 min	Jana Sussmann; Lauf Team Haspa Marathon Hamburg	9:54.72 min	Agnes Thurid Gers; SCC Berlin	9:55.39 min
4 × 100 m relay	MTG Mannheim; Katrin Wallmann; Lisa Nippgen; Nadine Gonska; Jessica-Bianca Wessolly	43.92 s	TSV Bayer 04 Leverkusen; Yasmin Kwadwo; Jennifer Montag; Anna Maiwald; Mareike Arndt	44.21 s	LC Paderborn; Chantal Butzek; Janina Kölsch; Alina Kuß; Tatjana Pinto	44.62 s
4 × 400 m relay	LT DSHS Köln I Laura Marx; Felicitas Ulmer; Elena Kelety; Nelly Schmidt	3:36.21 min	SCC Berlin; Svea Köhrbrück; Franziska Kindt; Alica Schmidt	3:36.62 min	LT DSHS Köln II; Lena Naumann; Laura Voß; Julia Bakker; Christine Salterberg	3:37.96 min
3 × 800 m Staffel	LG Stadtwerke München; Mareen Kalis; Katharina Trost; Christina Hering	6:14.61 min	TSV Bayer 04 Leverkusen; Lena Klaassen; Sarah Schmidt; Rebekka Ackers	6:24.98 min	SG Schorndorf 1846; Anna Karina Becker; Gina Daubenfeld; Hanna Klein	6:32.00 min
5000 m walk	Teresa Zurek; SC Potsdam	22:08.89 min	Bianca Schenker; LG Vogtland	24:40.19 min	nur zwei Geherinnen am Start	
20 km walk	Saskia Feige; SC Potsdam	1:30:40 h	Emilia Lehmeyer; Polizei SV Berlin	1:32:45 h	Teresa Zurek; SC Potsdam	1:35:03 h
20 km walk team	No finishing teams					
High jump	Marie-Laurence Jungfleisch; VfB Stuttgart	1.90 m	Imke Onnen; Hannover 96	1.87 m	Lavinja Jürgens; TSV Kranzegg	1.84 m
Pole vault	Lisa Ryzih; ABC Ludwigshafen	4.60 m	Stefanie Dauber; SSV Ulm 1846	4.46 m	Jacqueline Otchere; MTG Mannheim	4.41 m
Long jump	Malaika Mihambo; LG Kurpfalz	7.16 m	Merle Homeier; VfL Bückeburg	6.42 m	Lea-Jasmin Riecke; Mitteldeutscher Sportclub	6.29 m
Triple jump	Kristin Gierisch; LAC Erdgas Chemnitz	14.26 m	Neele Eckhardt; LG Göttingen	13.93 m	Maria Purtsa; LAC Erdgas Chemnitz	13.24 m
Shot put	Christina Schwanitz; LV 90 Erzgebirge	18.84 m	Sara Gambetta; SV Halle	17.95 m	Alina Kenzel; VfL Waiblingen	17.83 m
Discus throw	Kristin Pudenz; SC Potsdam	64.37 m	Nadine Müller; SV Halle	63.99 m	Shanice Craft; MTG Mannheim	63.22 m
Hammer throw	Charlene Woitha; SCC Berlin	67.57 m	Carolin Paesler; TSV Bayer 04 Leverkusen	66.38 m	Samantha Borutta; TSG Mutterstadt	62.40 m
Javelin throw	Christin Hussong; LAZ Zweibrücken	65.33 m	Annika-Marie Fuchs; SC Potsdam	58.61 m	Christine Winkler; SC DHfK Leipzig	55.38 m
Heptathlon	Anna Maiwald; TSV Bayer 04 Leverkusen	6106 pts	Mareike Arndt; TSV Bayer 04 Leverkusen	5804 pts	Laura Voß; LT DSHS Köln	5379 pts
Heptathlon team	SWC Regensburg; Anna-Lena Obermaier; Isabel Mayer; Marion Brunner	15.062 pts	TSV Schleißheim; Julia Schneider; Franziska Halbritter; Carlotta Schraub	14.198 pts	LG Eckental; Jasmin Maxbauer; Johanna Stegmaier; Lea Clemens	13.882 pts
Cross country 5.1 km	Elena Burkard; LG farbtex Nordschwarzwald	17:29 min	Anna Gehring; ASV Köln	17:41 min	Caterina Granz; LG Nord Berlin	18:09 min
Cross country team	LG Nord Berlin I Caterina Granz; Deborah Schöneborn; Rabea Schöneborn	16; 55:18 min	ASV Köln; Anna Gehring; Vera Coutellier; Esther Jacobitz	35; 56:23 min	LG Nord Berlin II; Luisa Boschan; Carmen Schultze-Berndt; Mares-Elaine Strempler	46; 57:49 min
Ultratrail; 78 km/3000 m height	Pia Winkelblech; Landau Running Company	8:37:15 h	Annette Müller; LG Nord Berlin Ultrateam	9:07:33 h	Pamela Veith; TSV Kusterdingen	9:11:48 h
Ultratrail team	Landau Running Company; Pia Winkelblech; Silke Herrgen; Iris Stern	29:22:44 h	Laufclub BlueLiner; Ilka Friedrich; Anke Redantz; Brigitte Rodenbeck	39:41:22 h	Only two finishing teams	
24-hour run	Antje Krause; Ultra Sport Club Marburg	218.346 km	Simone Durry; TG Neuss	191.834 km	Ilka Friedrich; Laufclub BlueLiner	175.304 km
24-hour run team	Laufclub BlueLiner; Ilka Friedrich; Tanja Elezovic; Brigitte Rodenbeck	479.583 km	LG Ultralauf I Petra Fornaçon; Mechthild Kolter; Edda Bauer	446.668 km	LG Ultralauf II; Elisabeth Ploch; Katrin Tüg-Hilbert; Marlene Heller	350.619 km
