= 2018 German Athletics Championships =

- Dates: 21–22 July 2018
- Host city: Nuremberg, Germany
- Venue: Max-Morlock-Stadion
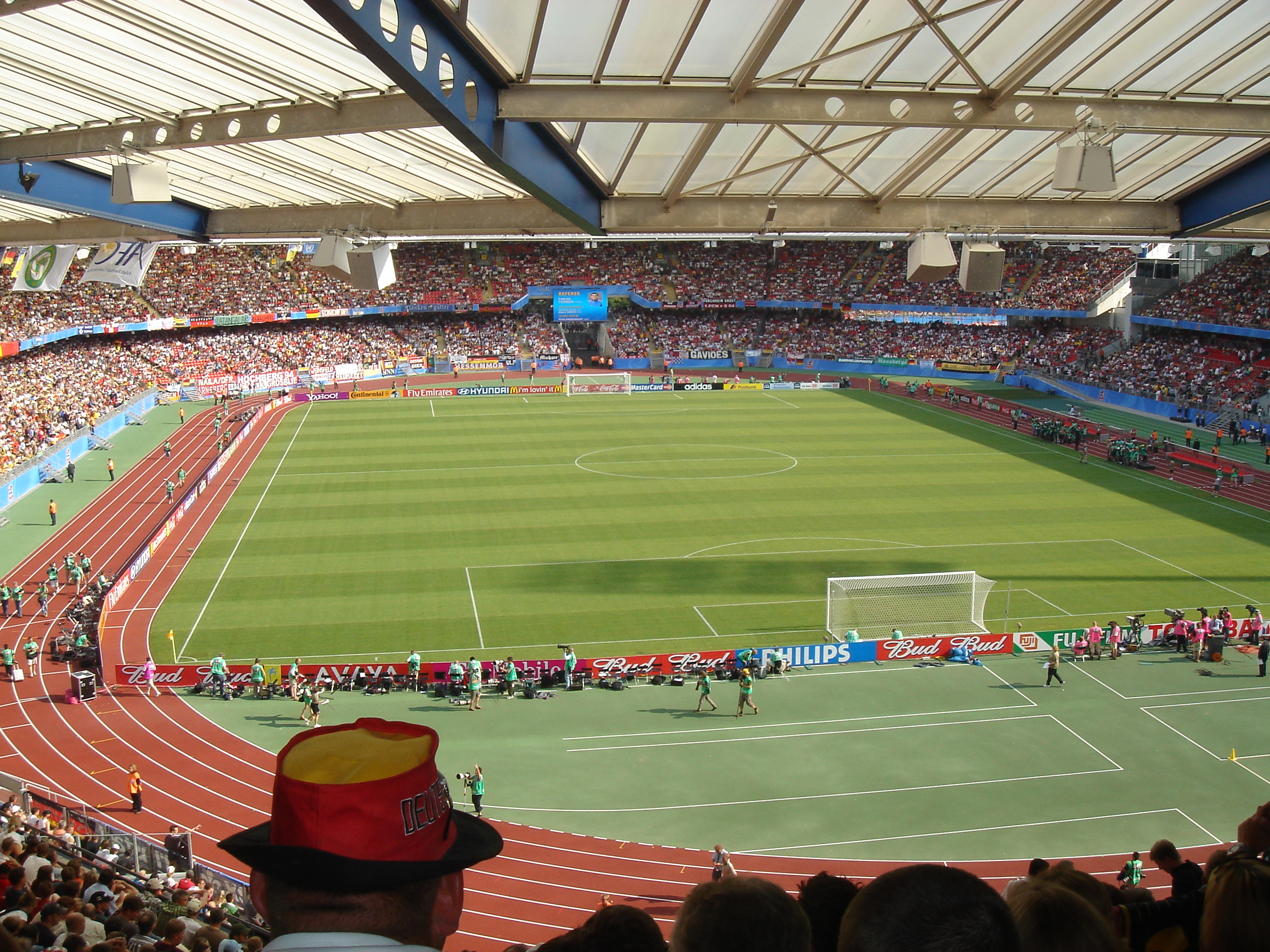

The 2018 German Athletics Championships was the 118th edition of the national championship in outdoor track and field for Germany. It was held on 21 and 22 July at the Max-Morlock-Stadion in Nuremberg. It served as the selection meeting for Germany at the 2018 European Athletics Championships.

Andreas Hofmann won the men's javelin throw in a meeting record of 89.55 m (293 ft 9 1/2 in), taking his first national title.

== Championships ==
The annual national championships in Germany comprised the following competitions:

- Cross country running: Ohrdruf, March 10
- 100 km: Rheine, March 10
- Half marathon: Hanover, April 8
- 20 km road walk: Naumburg, April 14
- Marathon: as part of the Düsseldorf Marathon on April 29
- 10,000 m: Pliezhausen, 12 May
- Relays: Rostock, July 29 (held alongside the German Youth Championships)=
- Combined events: Wesel, 25/26 August
- Mountain running: Ilsenburg, 1 September
- 10K run: Bremen, 2 September
- 50 km road walk: Aschersleben, October 14

A road walking championship was scheduled for 3 June but was cancelled due to the lack of a host.

== Results ==
=== Men ===
Event	Gold		Silver		Bronze	
100 metres	Kevin Kranz; Sprintteam Wetzlar	10.28	Julian Reus; LAC Erfurt	10.32	Lucas Jakubczyk; SCC Berlin	10.37
200 metres	Robin Erewa; TV Wattenscheid 01	20.63	Steven Müller; LG Ovag Friedberg-Fauerbach	20.76	Kevin Ugo; TV Wattenscheid 01	20.89
400 metres	Johannes Trefz; LG Stadtwerke München	45.70	Patrick Schneider; LAC Quelle Fürth	45.82	Fabian Dammermann; LG Osnabrück	45.94
800 metres	Benedikt Huber; LG Telis Finanz Regensburg	1:47.32 min	Christoph Kessler; LG Region Karlsruhe	1:47.60 min	Marc Reuther; SV Wiesbaden	1:47.70 min
1500 metres	Timo Benitz; LG farbtex Nordschwarzwald	3:53.43 min	Marius Probst; TV Wattenscheid 01	3:53.47 min	Homiyu Tesfaye; LG Eintracht Frankfurt	3:53.53 min
5000 metres	Sebastian Hendel; LG Vogtland	14:16.54 min	Florian Orth; LG Telis Finanz Regensburg	14:16.89 min	Amanal Petros; SV Brackwede	14:16.96 min
10,000 metres	Sebastian Hendel; LG Vogtland	29:13.64 min	Simon Boch; LG Telis Finanz Regensburg	29:24.95 min	Florian Orth; LG Telis Finanz Regensburg	29:29.09 min
10K run	Jannik Arbogast; LG Region Karlsruhe	29:24 min	Samuel Fitwi Sibhatu; LG Vulkaneifel	29:27 min	Florian Orth; LG Telis Finanz Regensburg	29:29 min
10K run team	LG Telis Finanz Regensburg I Florian Orth; Simon Boch; Tim Ramdane Cherif	1:29:20 h	LG Telis Finanz Regensburg II; Moritz Beinlich; Kevin Key; Erik Hille	1:30:57 h	LG Olympia Dortmund; Fabian Dillenhöfer; David Valentin; Leif Gunkel	1:33:34 h
Half marathon	Karsten Meier; LG Braunschweig	1:05:23 h	Jens Nerkamp; PSV Grün-Weiß Kassel	1:05:27 h	Philipp Baar; ART Düsseldorf	1:05:49 h
Half marathon team	ART Düsseldorf; Philipp Baar; Paul Schmidt; Andreas Straßner	3:21:34 h	TV Wattenscheid 01; Hendrik Pfeiffer; Julius Scherr; Christoph Uphues	3:23:22 h	LAV Stadtwerke Tübingen; Timo Göhler; Lorenz Baum; Peter Obenauer	3:25:12 h
Marathon	Tom Gröschel; TC FIKO Rostock	2:15:20 h	Sebastian Reinwand; ART Düsseldorf	2:15:27 h	Marcus Schöfisch lauftraining.com	2:15:59 h
Marathon team	ART Düsseldorf; Sebastian Reinwand; Philipp Baar; Andreas Straßner	6:51:22	LSF Münster; David Schönherr; Yannick Rinne; Sven Serke	7:32:53 h	PSV Grün-Weiß Kassel; Jens Nerkamp; Nikolaj Dorka; Daniel Ghebreselasie	7:54:29 h
100 kilometres	Alexander Dautel; LG Nord Berlin Ultrateam	7:01:05 h	Gerrit Wegener; Die Laufpartner	7:03:57 h	Christoph Lux; TG Viktoria Augsburg	7:33:17 h
100 kilometres team	LG Nord Berlin Ultrateam; Alexander Dautel; Benjamin Brade; Stefan Thoms	24:20:41 h	LG Ultralauf I Markus Meinke; Hans-Dieter Jancker; Georg Kirsch	26:49:55 h	LG Ultralauf II; Volker Greis; Roland Krauss; Martin R.Kurz	28:30:28 h
110 m hurdles	Gregor Traber; LAV Stadtwerke Tübingen	13.37	Erik Balnuweit; TV Wattenscheid 01	13.52	Maximilian Bayer; MTV 1881 Ingolstadt	13.77
400 m hurdles	Luke Campbell; LG Eintracht Frankfurt	50.31	Constantin Preis; VfL Sindelfingen	50.74	Joshua Abuaku; LG Eintracht Frankfurt	51.25
3000 m s'chase	Martin Grau; LSC Höchstadt/Aisch	8:33.90 min	Patrick Karl; TV Ochsenfurt	8:41.22 min	Fabian Clarkson; SCC Berlin	8:41.50 min
4 × 100 m relay	TV Wattenscheid 01 I Philipp Trutenat; Robin Erewa; Maurice Huke; Robert Hering	38.79	SC DHfK Leipzig; Ole Werner; Niels Torben Giese; Roy Schmidt; Marvin Schulte	39.47	TV Wattenscheid 01 II; Noel-Philippe Fiener; Kevin Ugo; Alexander Kosenkow; Erik Balnuweit	39.78
4 × 400 m relay	LG Stadtwerke München; Benedikt Wiesend; Tobias Giehl; Arne Leppelsack; Johannes Trefz	3:08.99 min	VfL Sindelfingen; Yannik Frers; Felix Franz; Yannic Krings; Constantin Preis	3:12.07 min	SSV Ulm 1846 II; Philipp Kleemann; Fynn Zenker; Tim Nowak; Arthur Abele	3:12.09 min
3 × 1000 m relay	LG Farbtex Nordschwarzwald; Hendrik Engel; Denis Bäuerle; Timo Benitz	7:14.82 min	StG Erfurt - Jena; Tobias Rex; Philipp Reinhardt; Sebastian Keiner	7:15.02 min	LG Braunschweig; Andreas Lange; Viktor Kuk; Julius Lawnik	7:15.39 min
20 km walk	Christopher Linke; SC Potsdam	1:20:40 h	Hagen Pohle; SC Potsdam	1:21:41 h	Karl Junghannß; LAC Erfurt	1:22:51 h
20 km walk team	SC Potsdam; Christopher Linke; Hagen Pohle; Nils Brembach	4:05:39 h	TV Bühlertal; Nathaniel Seiler; Denis Franke; Georg Hauger	5:09:49 h	SV Breitenbrunn; Steffen Meyer; Nischan Daimer; Joachim Maier	5:35:48 h
50 km walk	Jonathan Hilbert; LG Ohra Energie	3:51:22 h	Denis Franke; TV Bühlertal	5:11:26 h	Only two starters	
High jump	Mateusz Przybylko; TSV Bayer 04 Leverkusen	2.31 m	Tobias Potye; LG Stadtwerke München	2.22 m	Bastian Rudolf; Dresdner SC	2.19 m
Pole vault	Bo Kanda Lita Baehre; TSV Bayer 04 Leverkusen	5.50 m	Torben Laidig; LAV Stadtwerke Tübingen	5.40 m	Jakob Köhler-Baumann; LG Filstal; Daniel Clemens; LAZ Zweibrücken	5.40 m
Long jump	Fabian Heinle; VfB Stuttgart	8.04 m	Maximilian Entholzner; 1.FC Passau	7.72 m	Ituah Enahoro; LAV Bayer Uerdingen/Dormagen	7.68 m
Triple jump	Felix Wenzel; SC Potsdam	16.08 m	Felix Mairhofer; LG Region Karlsruhe	15.79 m	Benjamin Bauer; LAC Erdgas Chemnitz	15.78 m
Shot put	David Storl; SC DHfK Leipzig	21.26 m	Patrick Müller; SC Neubrandenburg	19.49 m	Tobias Dahm; VfL Sindelfingen	19.38 m
Discus throw	Christoph Harting; SCC Berlin	66.98 m	Daniel Jasinski; TV Wattenscheid 01	64.82 m	Robert Harting; SCC Berlin	63.92 m
Hammer throw	Johannes Bichler; LG Stadtwerke München	71.67 m	Tristan Schwandke; TV Hindelang	70.88 m	Alexei Mikhailov; TV Wattenscheid 01	68.90 m
Javelin throw	Andreas Hofmann; MTG Mannheim	89.55 m CR	Thomas Röhler; LC Jena	88.09 m	Johannes Vetter; LG Offenburg	87.83 m
Decathlon	Niklas Ransiek; TSV Bayer 04 Leverkusen	7355 pts	Hendrik Nungeß; TV 1861 Neu-Isenburg	7030 pts	Marvin Gregor; LG Kreis Gütersloh	6935 pts
Decathlon team	LG Kreis Gütersloh; Marvin Gregor; André Düsterhöft; Florian Baum	19.868 pts	TV Wattenscheid 01; Armin Treichel; Lennart Ogaza; Jan Ollech	18.236 pts	Only two teams competed	
Cross country short course 4.1 km	Timo Benitz; LG farbtex Nordschwarzwald	12:44 min	Florian Orth; LG Telis Finanz Regensburg	12:49 min	Fabian Clarkson; SCC Berlin	12:55 min
Cross country short course team	LG Telis Finanz Regensburg; Florian Orth; Dominik Notz; Tim Ramdane Cherif	11 (38:43 min)	LG farbtex Nordschwarzwald; Timo Benitz; Marco Kern; Hendrik Engel	17 (39:07 min)	SSV Ulm 1846; Aimen Haboubi; Fabian Konrad; Korbinian Völkl	40 (40:30 min)
Cross country long course 9.9 km	Philipp Pflieger; LG Telis Finanz Regensburg	31:07 min	Karsten Meier; LG Braunschweig	31:19 min	Tim Ramdane Cherif; LG Telis Finanz Regensburg	31:31 min
Cross country long course team	LG Telis Finanz Regensburg I Philipp Pflieger; Tim Ramdane Cherif; Florian Orth	9 (1:34:45 h)	LG Braunschweig; Karsten Meier; Viktor Kuk; Florian Pehrs	33 (1:38:34 h)	LG Telis Finanz Regensburg II; Maximilian Zeus; Felix Plinke; Kevin Key	37 (1:39:58 h)
Mountain running	Maximilian Zeus; LG Telis Finanz Regensburg	51:11 min	Aaron Bienenfeld; SSC Hanau-Rodenbach	51:12 min	Konstantin Wedel; LAC Quelle Fürth	51:14 min
Mountain running team	SSC Hanau-Rodenbach; Aaron Bienenfeld; Lukas Abele; Julius Hild	2:41:04 h	LG Allgäu; Michael Laur; Franz Schweiger; Wolfgang Wäger	2:53:59 h	LG Braunschweig; Ole Hennseler; Ole Marggraf; Simon Laue	2:58:24 h

=== Women ===
Event	Gold		Silver		Bronze	
100 metres	Gina Lückenkemper; TSV Bayer 04 Leverkusen	11.15	Lisa Marie Kwayie; Neuköllner Sportfreunde	11.33	Rebekka Haase; LV 90 Erzgebirge	11.42
200 metres	Jessica-Bianca Wessolly; MTG Mannheim	22.89	Laura Müller; LC Rehlingen	23.11	Rebekka Haase; LV 90 Erzgebirge	23.12
400 metres	Nadine Gonska; MTG Mannheim	52.07	Hannah Mergenthaler; MTG Mannheim	52.83	Corinna Schwab; TV 1861 Amberg	53.14
800 metres	Christina Hering; LG Stadtwerke München	2:01.56 min	Sarah Schmidt; TSV Bayer 04 Leverkusen	2:02.89 min	Mareen Kalis; LG Stadtwerke München	2:03.53 min
1500 metres	Konstanze Klosterhalfen; TSV Bayer 04 Leverkusen	4:06.34 min	Elena Burkard; LG farbtex Nordschwarzwald	4:06.51 min	Diana Sujew; LG Eintracht Frankfurt	4:08.21 min
5000 metres	Hanna Klein; SG Schorndorf	15:17.47 min	Alina Reh; SSV Ulm 1846	15:25.30 min	Denise Krebs; TSV Bayer 04 Leverkusen	15:26.58 min
10,000 metres	Anna Gehring; ASV Köln	33:33.96 min	Deborah Schöneborn; LG Nord Berlin	33:37.48 min	Thea Heim; LG Telis Finanz Regensburg	34:35.40 min
10K run	Alina Reh; SSV Ulm 1846	32:23 min	Deborah Schöneborn; LG Nord Berlin	33:56 min	Luisa Boschan; LG Nord Berlin	34:59 min
10K run team	LG Nord Berlin; Deborah Schöneborn; Luisa Boschan; Rabea Schöneborn	1:44:39 h	Hannover Athletics; Svenja Pingpank; Lena Sommer; Anne Spickhoff	1:48:38 h	LG Region Landshut; Regina Högl; Miriam Zirk; Julia Brugger	1:49:37 h
Half marathon	Franziska Reng; LG Telis Finanz Regensburg	1:14:15 h	Miriam Dattke; LG Telis Finanz Regensburg	1:14:37 h	Fabienne Amrhein; MTG Mannheim	1:15:19 h
Half marathon team	LG Telis Finanz Regensburg I Franziska Reng; Miriam Dattke; Marina Rappold	3:47:05 h	SG Wenden; Christl Dörschel; Daniela Wurm; Verena Schneider	4:07:14 h	LG Telis Finanz Regensburg II; Anna-Katharina Plinke; Cornelia Griesche; Eva Schien	4:07:41 h
Marathon	Fabienne Amrhein; MTG Mannheim	2:32:35 h	Isabel Leibfried; TSG 1845 Heilbronn	2:41:40 h	Regina Högl; LG Region Landshut	2:45:56 h
Marathon team	LG Region Landshut; Regina Högl; Miriam Zirk; Elisabeth Jensen	8:28:17 h	PSV Grün-Weiß Kassel; Sandra Morchner; Anna Starostzik; Jutta Siefert	8:44:17 h	TuS Deuz; Tina Schneider; Rebekka Wörmann; Nina Caprice Löhr	8:59:11 h
100 kilometres	Nele Alder-Baerens; Ultra SC Marburg	7:33:15 h	Susanne Kraus; PSV Grün-Weiß Kassel	7:59:12 h	Anke Libuda; BSG Springorum Bochum	8:43:38 h
100 kilometres team	LG Ultralauf I Kirsten Althoff; Claudia Lederer; Rita Nowottny-Hupka	28:14:12 h	LG Ultralauf II; Sylvia Faller; Katrin Tüg-Hilbert; Kerstin Hommel	34:23:09 h	Only two teams entered	
100 m hurdles	Pamela Dutkiewicz; TV Wattenscheid 01	12.69	Ricarda Lobe; MTG Mannheim	13.06	Franziska Hofmann; LAC Erdgas Chemnitz	13.10
400 m hurdles	Christine Salterberg; LT DSHS Köln	56.97	Djamila Böhm; ART Düsseldorf	57.06	Carolina Krafzik; VfL Sindelfingen	58.73
3000 m s'chase	Gesa Felicitas Krause; Silvesterlauf Trier	9:34.58 min	Antje Möldner-Schmidt; LC Cottbus	9:45.82 min	Jana Sussmann; Lauf Team Haspa Marathon Hamburg	9:47.57 min
4 × 100 m relay	MTG Mannheim; Ricarda Lobe; Alexandra Burghardt; Nadine Gonska; Jessica-Bianca Wessolly	43.33	TSV Bayer 04 Leverkusen; Yasmin Kwadwo; Jennifer Montag; Gina Lückenkemper; Mareike Arndt	43.55	TV Wattenscheid 01; Monika Zapalska; Keshia Kwadwo; Synthia Oguama; Pamela Dutkiewicz	44.17
4 × 400 m relay	LT DSHS Köln; Laura Marx; Nelly Schmidt; Christine Salterberg; Lena Naumann	3:36.07 min	SCC Berlin; Hendrikje Richter; Svea Köhrbrück; Franziska Kindt; Alena Gerken	3:36.90 min	TSV Bayer 04 Leverkusen; Tabea Marie Kempe; Maren Silies; Rebekka Ackers; Sarah Schmidt	3:38.16 min
3 × 800 m relay	LG Stadtwerke München; Christine Gess; Katharina Trost; Mareen Kalis	6:12.41 min	TSV Bayer 04 Leverkusen; Lena Klaassen; Rebekka Ackers; Sarah Schmidt	6:12.86 min	LG Nord Berlin; Isabelle Kuhn; Martha Sauter; Caterina Granz	6:17.47 min
20 km walk	Emilia Lehmeyer; Polizei SV Berlin	1:32:49 h	Saskia Feige; SC Potsdam	1:33:23 h	Teresa Zurek; SC Potsdam	1:33:30 h
20 km walk team	TV Groß-Gerau; Linda Betto; Brigitte Patrzalek; Monika Müller	6:55:31 h	Only one team finished			
High jump	Marie-Laurence Jungfleisch; VfB Stuttgart	1.87 m	Imke Onnen; Hannover 96	1.84 m	Katarina Mögenburg; TSV Bayer 04 Leverkusen	1.80 m
Pole vault	Jacqueline Otchere; MTG Mannheim	4.45 m	Stefanie Dauber; SSV Ulm 1846	4.45 m	Friedelinde Petershofen; SC Potsdam	4.35 m
Long jump	Malaika Mihambo; LG Kurpfalz	6.72 m	Alexandra Wester; ASV Köln	6.69 m	Julia Gerter; LG Eintracht Frankfurt	6.68 m
Triple jump	Neele Eckhardt; LG Göttingen	14.21 m	Kristin Gierisch; LAC Erdgas Chemnitz	14.15 m	Jessie Maduka; ART Düsseldorf	13.74 m
Shot put	Christina Schwanitz; LV 90 Erzgebirge	20.06 m	Alina Kenzel; VfL Waiblingen	18.21 m	Sara Gambetta; SV Halle	17.79 m
Discus throw	Shanice Craft; MTG Mannheim	62.91 m	Nadine Müller; SV Halle	62.73 m	Anna Rüh; SC Magdeburg	62.65 m
Hammer throw	Kathrin Klaas; LG Eintracht Frankfurt	66.08 m	Susen Küster; TSV Bayer 04 Leverkusen	65.09 m	Charlene Woitha; SCC Berlin	64.92 m
Javelin throw	Christin Hussong; LAZ Zweibrücken	63.54 m	Katharina Molitor; TSV Bayer 04 Leverkusen	56.75 m	Christina Kiffe; ASC Darmstadt	54.45 m
Heptathlon	Anna Maiwald; TSV Bayer 04 Leverkusen	5711 pts	Christina Kiffe; ASC Darmstadt	5574 pts	Laura Voß; LT DSHS Köln	5451 pts
Heptathlon team	LT DSHS Köln; Laura Voß; Claudia Mieke; Daya Södje	14.859 pts	LG Stadtwerke München; Jana Rieger; Julia Schneider; Carlotta Schraub	14.634 pts	MTV Lübeck; Janina Lange; Katharina Kemp; Jana Marketon	14.355 pts
Cross country 5.2 km	Elena Burkard; LG farbtex Nordschwarzwald	17:33 min	Alina Reh; SSV Ulm 1846	18:01 min	Caterina Granz; LG Nord Berlin	18:29 min
Cross country team	LG Nord Berlin; Caterina Granz; Deborah Schöneborn; Carmen Schultze-Berndt	28 (57:29 min)	LG Telis Finanz Regensburg; Miriam Dattke; Franziska Reng; Marina Rappold	32 (58:19 min)	LG Region Karlsruhe; Sarah Hettich; Johanna Flacke; Melina Wolf	77 (1:01:34 h)
Mountain running	Lisa Oed; SSC Hanau-Rodenbach	58:28 min	Stefanie Doll; SV Kirchzarten	59:19 min	Sarah Kistner; MTV Kronberg Laufen	1:01:25 h
Mountain running team	LG Brandenkopf; Anja Carlsohn; Franziska Schmieder; Ann-Cathrin Uhl	3:29:14 h	SSC Hanau-Rodenbach; Lisa Oed; Tatjana Rauhut; Angela Schick	3:29:43 h	ASC Darmstadt; Simone Raatz; Alexandra Rechel; Stefanie Hock	3:34:58 h
