= 2020 German Athletics Championships =

- Edition: 120th
- Start date: 8 August 2020
- End date: 9 August 2020
- Host city: Braunschweig, Germany
- Venue: Eintracht-Stadion
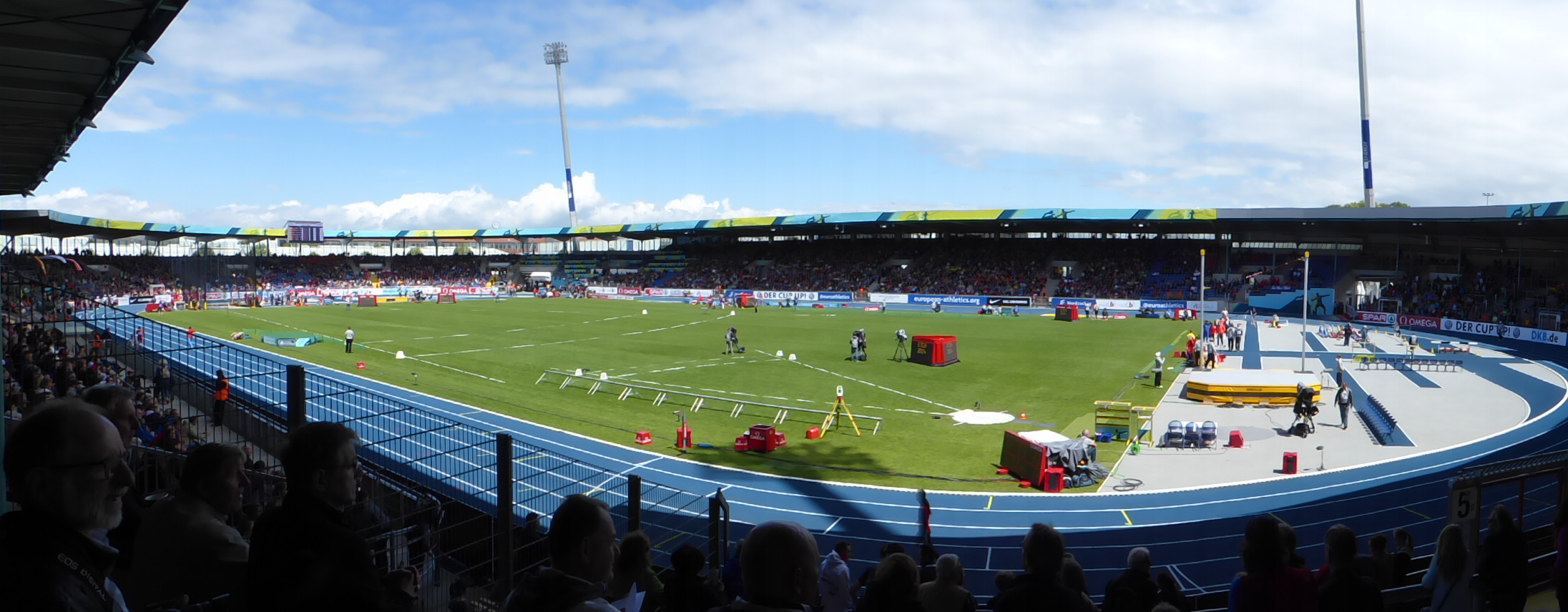
- Events: 38 (+31)

The 2020 German Athletics Championships was the 120th edition of the national championship in outdoor track and field for Germany. It was held on 8 and 9 August at the Eintracht-Stadion in Braunschweig. It was due to serve as the selection meeting for Germany at the 2020 Summer Olympics and 2020 European Athletics Championships, which were both postponed due to the COVID-19 pandemic. The national athletics championship had been due to be held at the same time fifteen other national championship events as part of Die Finals 2020.

The track and field events were originally scheduled for 6 and 7 June, but were delayed due to restrictions in relation to the pandemic. The pole vault was originally scheduled for 4 June in a separate event in the city centre, but was also postponed until August and was ultimately held within the stadium. A total of 477 athletes competed across 34 events. The only other national championships to go ahead that year were the German Cross Country Championships (which preceded the pandemic restrictions) and the combined track and field events, which were held without an audience.

The interruption to track and field training and competition that year resulted in the absence of several prominent athletes and lower standards of performance at the event.

== Championships ==
As usual, due to time or organizational reasons, various competitions were not held as part of the main event in Braunschweig. An independent German Relay Championships was scheduled with a full event programme for the first time, but that (like many other competitions) was abandoned.

Event	Venue	Date(s)	Notes
Cross country running	Sindelfingen	7 March	
50K run	Bottrop	8 November	Cancellation announced on 5 June
Half marathon	Freiburg im Breisgau	29 March	Cancellation announced on 10 March
20 kilometres race walk	Naumburg	6 May	Cancellation announced on 13 March
Marathon	Hannover	26 April	To be incorporated into the Hannover Marathon but postponed on 23 March and cancelled on 5 June
10,000 metres	Pliezhausen	9 May	Cancellation announced on 17 March
Ultratrail	Reichweiler	1 August	Was to be incorporated into the Chiemgauer100 but was cancelled.
Relays	Bochum-Wattenscheid	27–28 June	Cancellation announced on 16 April
Combined track and field events Women's heptathlon Men's decathlon	Vaterstetten	21–23 August	
6-hour run	Herne	5 April	Cancellation announced on 13 March
24-hour run	Schwindegg	3 –4 October	Cancellation announced on 2 May, though the host event in Bernau bei Berlin went ahead without national championship status
10K run	Uelzen	20 September	Cancellation announced on 5 June
100K run	Grünheide	28 March	Cancellation announced on 17 March
Mountain running	Zell am Harmersbach	4 October	Cancellation announced on 5 June
50 kilometres race walk	Gleina	10 October	Cancellation announced on 5 June

== Results ==
=== Men ===
Event	Gold		Silver		Bronze	
100 metres	Deniz Almas; VfL Wolfsburg	10.09 s	Joshua Hartmann; ASV Köln	10.23 s	Julian Reus; Erfurter LAC	10.26 s
200 metres	Steven Müller; LG OVAG Friedberg-Feuerbach	20.79 s	Robin Erewa; TV Wattenscheid	20.87 s	Roger Gurski; LG Rhein-Wied	20.91 s
400 metres	Marvin Schlegel; LAC Erdgas Chemnitz	45.79 s	Manuel Sanders; LG Olympia Dortmund	46.00 s	Patrick Schneider; LAC Quelle Fürth	46.11 s
800 metres	Marc Reuther; LG Eintracht Frankfurt	1:46.97 min	Christoph Kessler; LG Region Karlsruhe	1:47.44 min	Dennis Biederbick; LG Eintracht Frankfurt	1:47.51 min
1500 metres	Marius Probst; TV Wattenscheid	3:52.47 min	Lukas Abele; SSC Hanau-Rodenbach	3:53.55 min	Marvin Heinrich; LG Eintracht Frankfurt	3:54.13 min
5000 metres	Mohamed Mohumed; LG Olympia Dortmund	14:02.75 min	Maximilian Thorwirth; SFD 75 Düsseldorf-Süd	14:05.46 min	Florian Orth; LG Telis Finanz Regensburg	14:06.43 min
110 m hurdles	Matthias Bühler; TV Haslach	13.62 s	Erik Balnuweit; TV Wattenscheid	13.77 s	Georg Fleischhauer; LG Eintracht Frankfurt	13.86 s
400 m hurdles	Constantin Preis; VfL Sindelfingen	49.57 s	Emil Agyekum; SCC Berlin	49.78 s	Joshua Abuaku; LG Eintracht Frankfurt	50.50 s
3000 m s'chase	Karl Bebendorf; Dresdner SC	8:42.42 min	Tim Stegemann; Erfurter LAC	8:48.10 min	Martin Grau; Erfurter LAC	8:51.09 min
High jump	Mateusz Przybylko; TSV Bayer 04 Leverkusen	2.28 m	Tobias Potye; LG Stadtwerke München	2.20 m	Jonas Wagner; Dresdner SC	2.20 m
Pole vault	Bo Kanda Lita Baehre; TSV Bayer 04 Leverkusen	5.75 m	Torben Blech; TSV Bayer 04 Leverkusen	5.50 m	Raphael Holzdeppe; LAZ Zweibrücken	5.50 m
Long jump	Maximilian Entholzner; LAC Passau	7.96 m	Julian Howard; LG Region Karlsruhe	7.70 m	Bennet Vinken; Hamburger SV	7.57 m
Triple jump	Max Heß; LAC Erdgas Chemnitz	16.58 m	Felix Wenzel; SC Potsdam	15.95 m	Vincent Vogel; LAC Erdgas Chemnitz	15.52 m
Shot put	David Storl; SC DHfK Leipzig	20.17 m	Simon Bayer; VfL Sindelfingen	19.31 m	Dennis Lukas; LG Idar-Oberstein	19.15 m
Discus throw	Clemens Prüfer; SC Potsdam	62.97 m	Daniel Jasinski; TV Wattenscheid	61.68 m	Henrik Janssen; SC Magdeburg	59.88 m
Hammer throw	Tristan Schwandke; TV Hindelang	70.85 m	Merlin Hummel; UAC Kulmbach	69.53 m	Fabio Hessling; LAC Saarlouis	67.05 m
Javelin throw	Johannes Vetter; LG Offenburg	87.36 m	Andreas Hofmann; MTG Mannheim	77.35 m	Maurice Voigt; LG Ohra Energie	70.84 m
Decathlon	Malik Diakité; Hannover 96	7641 pts	Jan Ruhrmann; LAV Bayer Uerdingen/Dormagen	7601 pts	Nico Beckers; Aachener TG	7298 pts
Decathlon team	No teams entered					
Cross country short course 4.4 km	Simon Boch; LG Telis Finanz Regensburg	14:03 min	Johannes Motschmann; SCC Berlin	14:05 min	Konstantin Wedel; LG Telis Finanz Regensburg	14:08 min
Cross country short course team	LG Telis Finanz Regensburg; Simon Boch; Konstantin Wedel; Florian Orth	11; 42:40 min	SCC Berlin; Johannes Motschmann; Fabian Clarkson; Hannes Liebach	19; 43:17 min	LG farbtex Nordschwarzwald 1 Timo Benitz; Marco Kern; Marc Corin Steinsberger	24; 43:33 min
Cross country long course 9.9 km	Samuel Fitwi Sibhatu; LG Vulkaneifel	32:34 min	Simon Boch; LG Telis Finanz Regensburg	33:39 min	Maximilian Zeus; LG Telis Finanz Regensburg	33:44 min
Cross country long course team	LG Telis Finanz Regensburg; Simon Boch; Maximilian Zeus; Moritz Beinlich	21; 1:43:38 h	SG Wenden; Simon Huckestein; Jonas Hoffmann; Frederick Jonas Wehner	42; 1:47:16 h	LG Region Karlsruhe; Jan-Lukas Becker; Jannik Arbogast; Domenik Hahn	46; 1:47:53 h

=== Women ===
Event	Gold		Silver		Bronze	
100 metres	Lisa-Marie Kwayie; Neuköllner Sportfreunde	11.30 s	Rebekka Haase; Sprintteam Wetzlar	11.34 s	Lisa Nippgen; MTG Mannheim	11.40 s
200 metres	Jessica-Bianca Wessolly; MTG Mannheim	23.07 s	Laura Müller; LC Rehlingen	23.14 s	Lisa-Marie Kwayie; Neuköllner Sportfreunde	23.14 s
400 metres	Corinna Schwab; LG Telis Finanz Regensburg	51.72 s	Karolina Pahlitzsch; LG Nord Berlin	51.88 s	Ruth Sophia Spelmeyer; VfL Oldenburg	52.14 s
800 metres	Christina Hering; LG Stadtwerke München	2:01.62 min	Tanja Spill; LAV Bayer Uerdingen/Dormagen	2:02.07 min	Katharina Trost; LG Stadtwerke München	2:02.27 min
1500 metres	Hanna Klein; LAV Stadtwerke Tübingen	4:13.71 min	Vera Coutellier; ASV Köln	4:15.49 min	Caterina Granz; LG Nord Berlin	4:15.88 min
5000 metres	Alina Reh; SSV Ulm 1846	16:08.33 min	Rabea Schöneborn; LG Nord Berlin	16:18.57 min	Domenika Mayer; LG Telis Finanz Regensburg	16:19.00 min
100 m hurdles	Ricarda Lobe; MTG Mannheim	13.24 s	Anne Weigold; LG Mittweida	13.31 s	Monika Zapalska; LC Paderborn	13.33 s
400 m hurdles	Carolina Krafzik; VfL Sindelfingen	55.89 s	Djamila Böhm; ART Düsseldorf	56.63 s	Lisa Sophie Hartmann; VfL Sindelfingen	57.26 s
3000 m s'chase	Elena Burkard; LG farbtex Nordschwarzwald	9:50.31 min	Lea Meyer; VfL Löningen	9:59.87 min	Agnes Thurid Gers; SC Berlin	10:02.85 min
High jump	Christina Honsel; TV Wattenscheid	1.90 m	Alexandra Plaza; LT DSHS Köln	1.87 m	Lavinja Jürgens; TSV Kranzegg	1.84 m
Pole vault	Stefanie Dauber; SSV Ulm 1846 Ria Möllers; TSV Bayer 04 Leverkusen	4.40 m	Not awarded		Lisa Ryzih; ABC Ludwigshafen	4.30 m
Long jump	Malaika Mihambo; LG Kurpfalz	6.71 m	Maryse Luzolo; Königsteiner LV	6.40 m	Merle Homeier; LG Göttingen	6.34 m
Triple jump	Maria Purtsa; LAC Erdgas Chemnitz	13.65 m	Jessie Maduka; ART Düsseldorf	13.57 m	Caroline Joyeux; LG Nord Berlin	13.37 m
Shot put	Alina Kenzel; VfL Waiblingen	17.96 m	Julia Ritter; TV Wattenscheid	17.47 m	Yemisi Ogunleye; MTG Mannheim	16.62 m
Discus throw	Kristin Pudenz; SC Potsdam	62.30 m	Claudine Vita; SC Neubrandenburg	58.07 m	Julia Ritter; TV Wattenscheid	55.80 m
Hammer throw	Carolin Paesler; TSV Bayer 04 Leverkusen	70.99 m	Samantha Borutta; TSG Mutterstadt	66.20 m	Michelle Döpke; TSV Bayer 04 Leverkusen	62.99 m
Javelin throw	Christin Hussong; LAZ Zweibrücken	63.93 m	Annika Marie Fuchs; SC Potsdam	57.97 m	Lea Wipper; SC DHfK Leipzig	55.72 m
Heptathlon	Carolin Schäfer; LG Eintracht Frankfurt	6319 pts	Anna Maiwald; TSV Bayer 04 Leverkusen	6112 pts	Vanessa Grimm; Königsteiner LV	6047 pts
Heptathlon team	SWC Regensburg; Anna-Lena Obermaier; Isabel Mayer; Marion Brunner	16.228 pts	MTV Lübeck; Janina Lange; Katharina Kemp; Paula de Boer	15.587 pts	Only two teams entered	
Cross country – 5.5 km	Domenika Mayer; LG Telis Finanz Regensburg	21:24 min	Deborah Schöneborn; LG Nord Berlin	21:35 min	Klara Koppe; LG Brillux Münster	21:39 min
Cross country team	LG Nord Berlin; Deborah Schöneborn; Rabea Schöneborn; Luisa Boschan	14; 1:05:37 h	LG Telis Finanz Regensburg; Domenika Mayer; Svenja Ojstersek; Lisa Basener	50; 1:08:49 h	LG Region Karlsruhe; Johanna Flacke; Melina Wolf; Sarah Hettich	50; 1:09:13 h
