= 2022 European Marathon Cup =

Athletics competition held in Munich, Germany

The 2022 European Marathon Cup was the 12th edition of the European Marathon Cup of athletics and were held in Munich, Germany on 15 August 2022, inside of the 2022 European Championships

The total time is calculated on the sum of the times of the first three athletes arrived at the finish line, but the medals are awarded to all the athletes who have concluded the race.

== Results ==
Men
#	Country	Time
1st place, gold medalist(s)	Israel; Marhu Teferi; Gashau Ayale; Yimer Getahun; Girmaw Amare; Omer Ramon; Bukayawe Malede	6:31:48
2nd place, silver medalist(s)	Germany; Richard Ringer; Amanal Petros; Johannes Motschmann; Hendrik Pfeiffer; Konstantin Wedel; Simon Boch	6:35:52
3rd place, bronze medalist(s)	Spain; Ayad Lamdassem; Jorge Blanco; Daniel Mateo; Yago Rojo; Abdelaziz Merzougui	6:38:44
4	France	6:39:08
5	Italy	6:45:51
6	Estonia	6:50:11
7	Great Britain	6:51:14
8	Sweden	6:51:47
9	Portugal	6:55:08
10	Poland	6:58:43
11	Denmark	7:05:19
	Belgium	NM
	Switzerland	NM
	Turkey	NM

Women
#	Country	Time
1st place, gold medalist(s)	Germany; Miriam Dattke; Domenika Mayer; Deborah Schöneborn; Rabea Schöneborn; Katharina Steinruck; Kristina Hendel	7:28:48
2nd place, silver medalist(s)	Spain; Marta Galimany; Irene Pelayo; Elena Loyo; Laura Méndez Esquer	7:39:25
3rd place, bronze medalist(s)	Poland; Aleksandra Lisowska; Angelika Mach; Monika Jackiewicz; Izabela Paszkiewicz; Katarzyna Jankowska	7:40:54
4	Belgium	7:41:35
5	Ireland	7:48:28
6	Great Britain	7:51:19
7	Czech Republic	7:55:29
8	Netherlands	8:05:13
9	Sweden	8:07:41
10	Finland	8:18:45
	Norway	NM
	Portugal	NM
	Ukraine	NM
