= Tristan Schwandke =

German hammer thrower

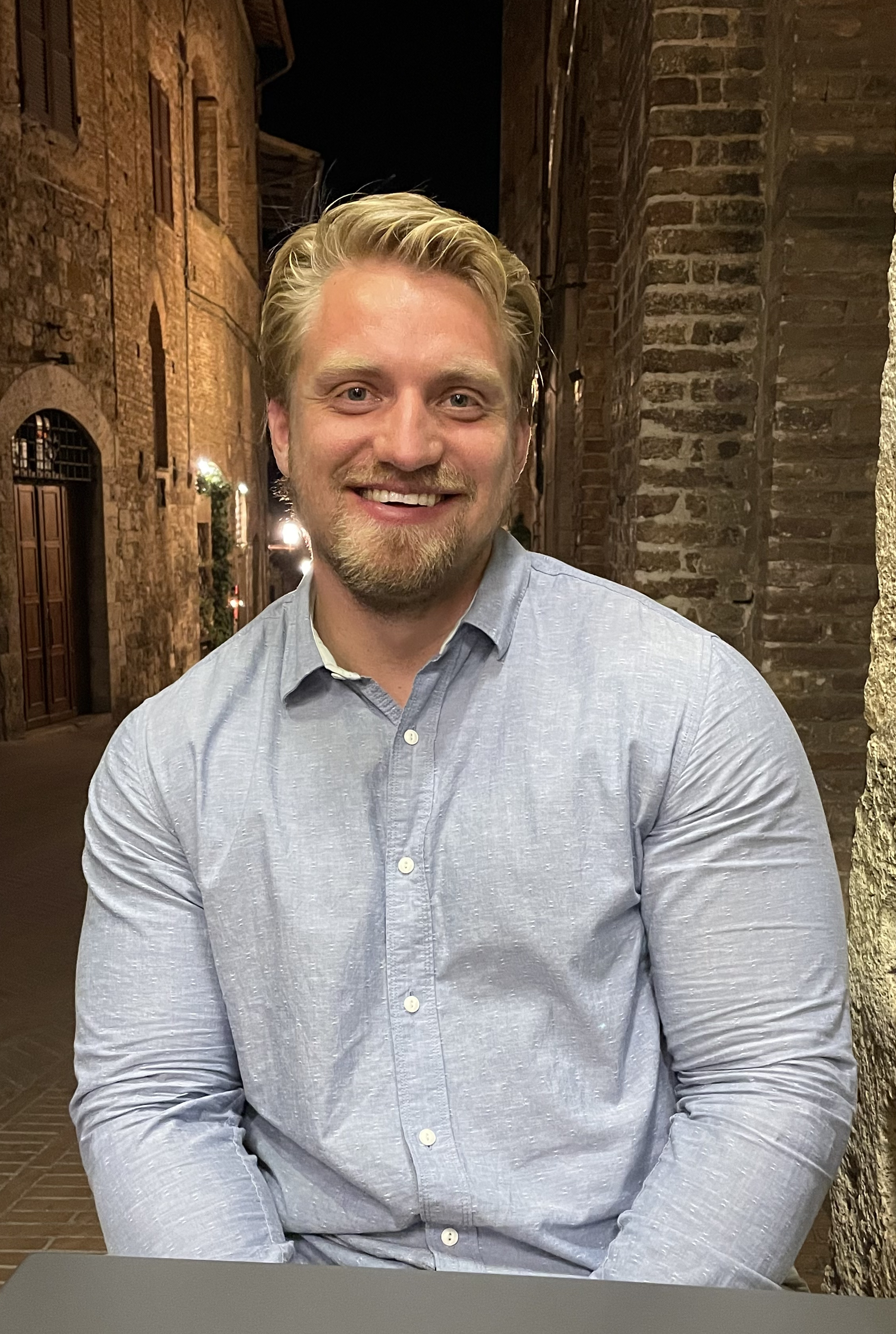
- 2021

Personal information
- Nationality: German
- Born: 23 May 1992 (age 34) Würzburg, Germany

Sport
- Sport: Athletics
- Event: Hammer throw

Tristan Schwandke (born 23 May 1992) is a German former hammer thrower who won multiple German national titles. He competed in the men's hammer throw event at the 2020 Summer Olympics.

== Career ==
A member of TV Hindelang, Schwandke began his athletic career 13 years ago in Bad Hindelang, Oberallgäu. After joining TV-Hindelang, he initially trained in various disciplines and only began to throw a hammer to improve his coordination. He quickly showed aptitude and began to focus intensively on it and soon gained successes becoming Allgäu Champion, Swabian Champion, and Bavarian Champion.

He won the silver medal in the hammer throw at the 2019 European Athletics Team Championships. He won the hammer throw at the 2019 German Athletics Championships the following month with a throw of 73.00 metres.

He also won the hammer throw at the 2020 and 2021 German Athletics Championships. In May 2021, he set a new personal best distance of 76.71 metres, the best distance by a German hammer thrower since Markus Esser in 2013. Whilst competing at the delayed 2020 Summer Olympics in Tokyo, Japan, Schwandke threw 73.77m to finish ninth in qualifying heat B. He finished runner-up to Merlin Hummel at the 2022 German Athletics Championships.

He missed the entirety of 2023 with a back injury. He announced his retirement from competition sport on his personal Instagram account in January 2025.

== Personal life ==
In 2021, Schwandke graduated from Wilhelm Buchner Hochschule in Darmstadt, Germany, with a master's degree in automotive engineering. He works as a researcher in the automotive industry in Kempten. He had previously studied automotive engineering at Kempten University of Applied Sciences.
