= 2022 European Athletics Championships – Women's 3000 metres steeplechase =

Women's 3000 metres steeplechase at the 2022 European Athletics Championships
- Venue: Olympiastadion
- Location: Munich
- Dates: 18 August (heats); 20 August (final)
- Competitors: 31 from 19 nations
- Winning time: 9:11.31 CR

Medalists
gold medal	Luiza Gega	Albania
silver medal	Lea Meyer	Germany
bronze medal	Elizabeth Bird	Great Britain

The women's 3000 metres steeplechase at the 2022 European Athletics Championships took place at the Olympiastadion on 18 and 20 August.

== Records ==
Standing records prior to the 2022 European Athletics Championships
World record	Beatrice Chepkoech (KEN)	8:44.32	Monaco	20 July 2018
European record	Gulnara Samitova-Galkina (RUS)	8:58.81	Beijing, China	17 August 2008
Championship record	Yuliya Zaripova (RUS)	9:17.57	Barcelona, Spain	30 July 2010
World Leading	Norah Jeruto (KAZ)	8:53.02	Eugene, United States	20 July 2022
Europe Leading	Elizabeth Bird (GBR)	9:07.87	Monaco	10 August 2022

== Schedule ==
Date	Time	Round
18 August 2022	09:20	Heats
20 August 2022	22:13	Final

All times are local times (UTC+2)

== Results ==
=== Heats ===
First 5 in each heat (Q) and the next 5 fastest (q) advance to the Final.

Rank	Heat	Name	Nationality	Time	Note
1	1	Luiza Gega	Albania	9:30.93	Q
2	1	Tuğba Güvenç	Turkey	9:31.86	Q, SB
3	1	Alicja Konieczek	Poland	9:33.54	Q, SB
4	1	Aimee Pratt	Great Britain	9:39.22	Q
5	2	Lea Meyer	Germany	9:39.55	Q
6	2	Adva Cohen	Israel	9:39.99	Q
7	2	Elizabeth Bird	Great Britain	9:40.05	Q
8	2	Irene Sánchez-Escribano	Spain	9:41.12	Q
9	2	Chiara Scherrer	Switzerland	9:41.85	Q
10	1	Claudia Prisecaru	Romania	9:43.51	Q
11	2	Elena Burkard	Germany	9:43.97	q
12	2	Carolina Robles	Spain	9:45.70	q
13	2	Maruša Mišmaš-Zrimšek	Slovenia	9:46.06	q
14	1	Nataliya Strebkova	Ukraine	9:47.35	q
15	1	Michelle Finn	Ireland	9:49.85	q
16	1	Olivia Gürth	Germany	9:50.95	
17	2	Flavie Renouard	France	9:51.49	
18	1	Greta Karinauskaitė	Lithuania	9:55.11	
19	2	Lena Millonig	Austria	9:57.50	
20	1	Linn Söderholm	Sweden	9:57.53	
21	1	Alexa Lemitre	France	9:58.49	
22	2	Patrycja Kapała	Poland	9:59.46	
23	1	Blanca Fernández	Spain	10:00.26	
24	2	Eilish Flanagan	Ireland	10:00.72	
25	1	Lili Anna Tóth	Hungary	10:08.18	SB
26	1	Elise Thorner	Great Britain	10:08.46	
27	2	Emilia Lillemo	Sweden	10:09.18	
28	1	Martina Merlo	Italy	10:12.13	
29	1	Eline Dalemans	Belgium	10:15.73	
30	2	Laura Dalla Montà	Italy	10:28.20	
31	2	Ruken Tek	Turkey	10:31.84	

=== Final ===
Rank	Name	Nationality	Time	Note
1st place, gold medalist(s)	Luiza Gega	Albania	9:11.31	CR
2nd place, silver medalist(s)	Lea Meyer	Germany	9:15.35	PB
3rd place, bronze medalist(s)	Elizabeth Bird	Great Britain	9:23.18	
4	Alicja Konieczek	Poland	9:25.15	PB
5	Tuğba Güvenç	Turkey	9:25.58	PB
6	Claudia Prisecaru	Romania	9:35.17	
7	Aimee Pratt	Great Britain	9:35.31	
8	Adva Cohen	Israel	9:36.84	
9	Nataliya Strebkova	Ukraine	9:37.52	
10	Irene Sánchez-Escribano	Spain	9:37.84	
11	Carolina Robles	Spain	9:38.96	
12	Elena Burkard	Germany	9:39.63	SB
13	Chiara Scherrer	Switzerland	9:43.95	
14	Michelle Finn	Ireland	9:47.57	
15	Maruša Mišmaš-Zrimšek	Slovenia	9:53.81	
