= Lea Meyer =

German middle-distance runner

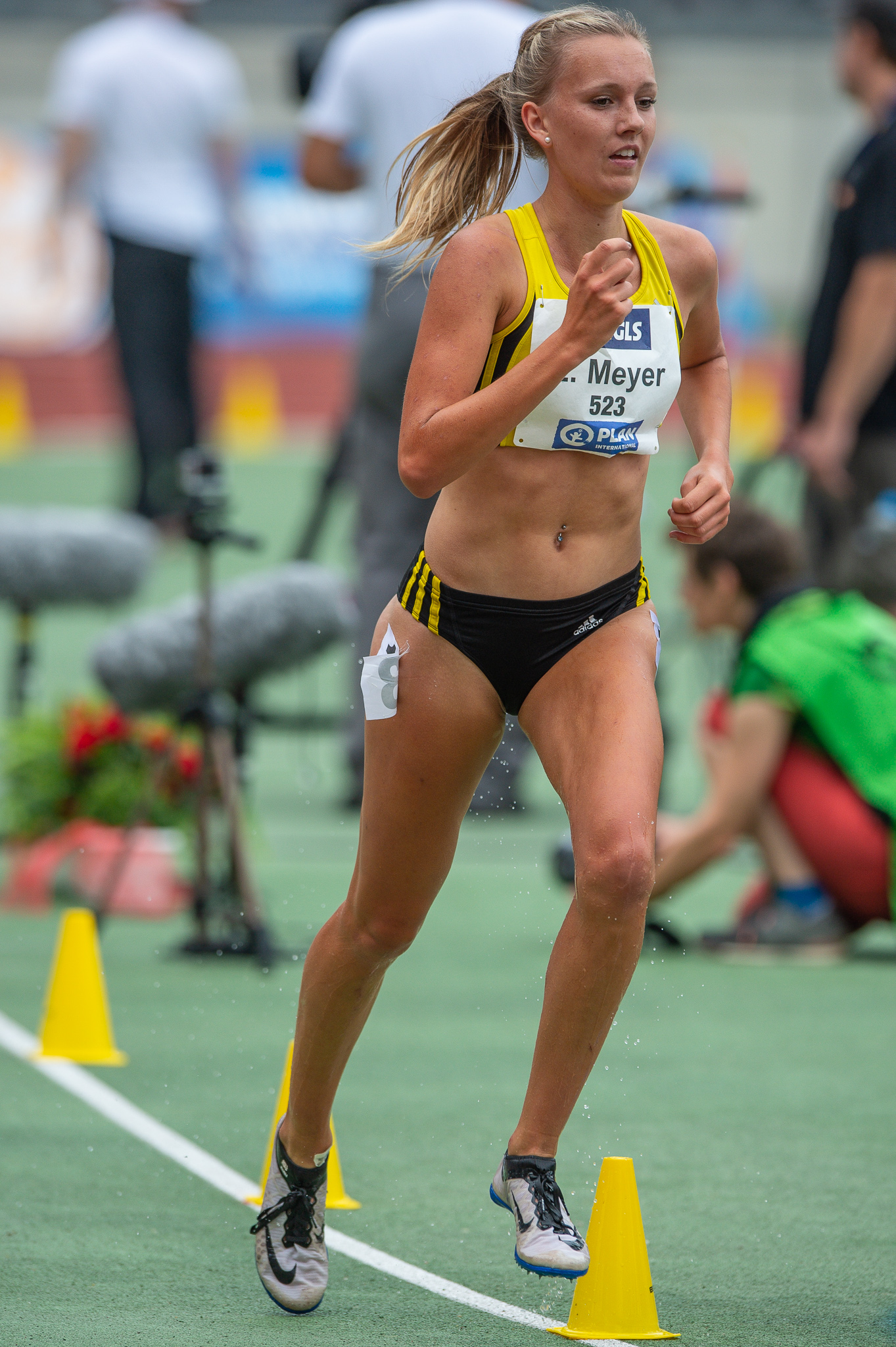
- Meyer in 2018

Personal information
- Nationality: German
- Born: 16 September 1997 (age 28)

Sport
- Sport: Athletics
- Event(s): 3000 metres steeplechase 3000 metres

Achievements and titles
- Personal best: 3000 metres steeplechase – 9:15.35 (Munich 2022)
Medal record
European Championships
| Silver medal – second place | Munich 2022 | 3000 m steeplechase |

Lea Meyer (born 16 September 1997) is a German athlete, specializing in the 3000 metres steeplechase. She won a silver medal in the steeplechase at the 2022 European Championships in Munich. Prior to this, she competed in the women's 3000 metres event at the 2021 European Athletics Indoor Championships.
