= Svea Köhrbrück =

German sprinter (born 1993)

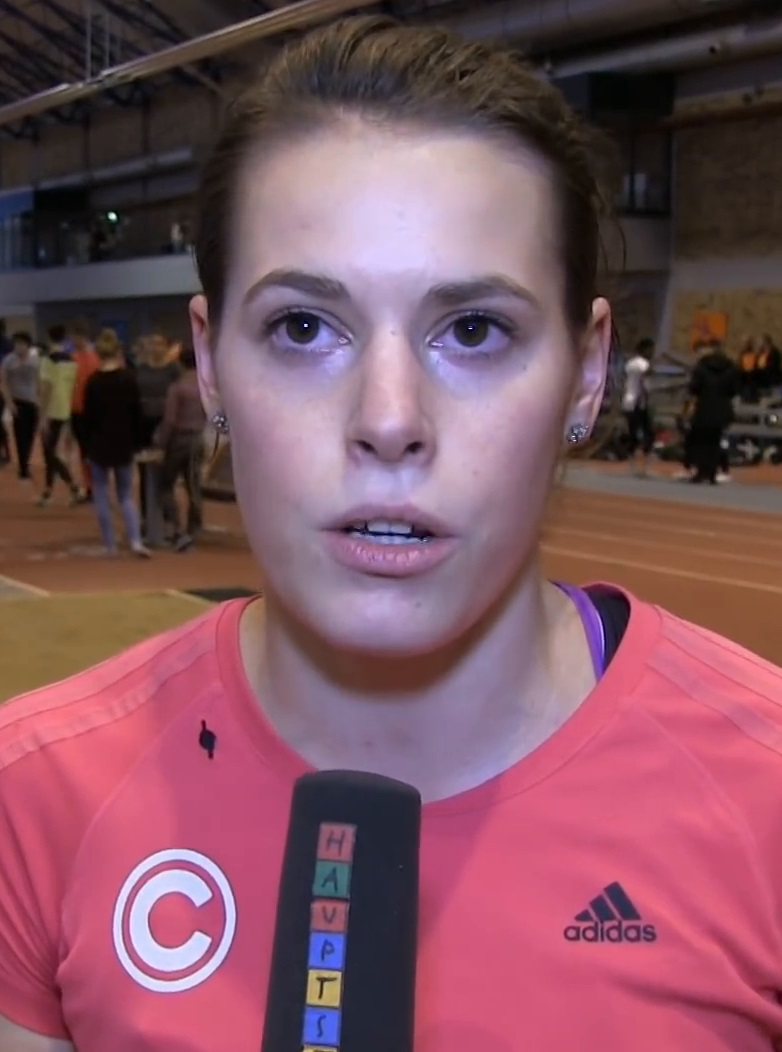
- Köhrbrück in 2017

Personal information
- Nationality: German
- Born: 16 October 1993 (age 32)

Sport
- Sport: Sprinting
- Event: 4 × 400 metres

Svea Köhrbrück (born 16 October 1993) is a German sprinter. She competed in the women's 4 × 400 metres relay at the 2017 World Championships in Athletics.
