= Philipp Pflieger =

German long-distance runner (born 1987)

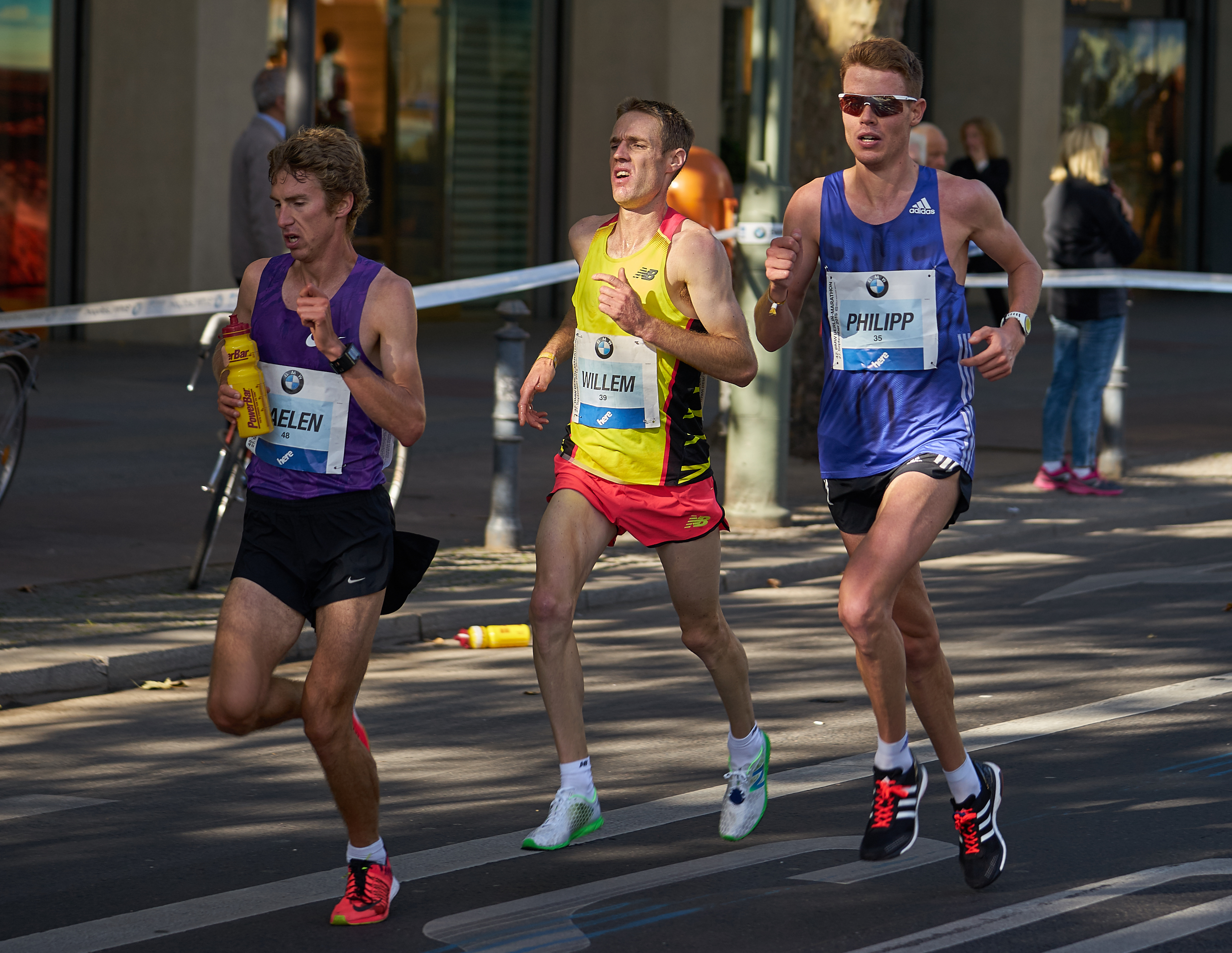
- Philipp Pflieger (right) in 2015

Personal information
- Nationality: German
- Born: 16 July 1987 (age 38)
- Height: 188 cm (6 ft 2 in)
- Weight: 70 kg (154 lb)

Sport
- Country: Germany
- Sport: Track and field
- Event: Marathon

Philipp Pflieger (born 16 July 1987) is a German long-distance runner who specialises in the marathon. He competed in the men's marathon event at the 2016 Summer Olympics where he finished in 55th place. In 2018, he competed in the men's marathon at the 2018 European Athletics Championships held in Berlin, Germany. He did not finish his race.
