= Hagen Pohle =

German racewalker

Personal information
- Born: 5 March 1992 (age 34)
- Height: 178 cm (5 ft 10 in)
- Weight: 64 kg (141 lb)

Sport
- Country: Germany
- Sport: Athletics (track and field)
- Event: Racewalking
- Updated on 29 August 2015

Hagen Pohle (born 5 March 1992) is a German racewalker. He competed in the 20 kilometres walk event at the 2015 World Championships in Athletics in Beijing, China. At the 2016 Summer Olympics, he competed in the 20 km walk event where he finished in 18th place and the 50 km walk event where he did not finish. In 2019, he competed in the men's 20 kilometres walk at the 2019 World Athletics Championships held in Doha, Qatar. He finished in 17th place.

== See also ==
- Germany at the 2015 World Championships in Athletics
