= Elena Burkard =

German long-distance runner

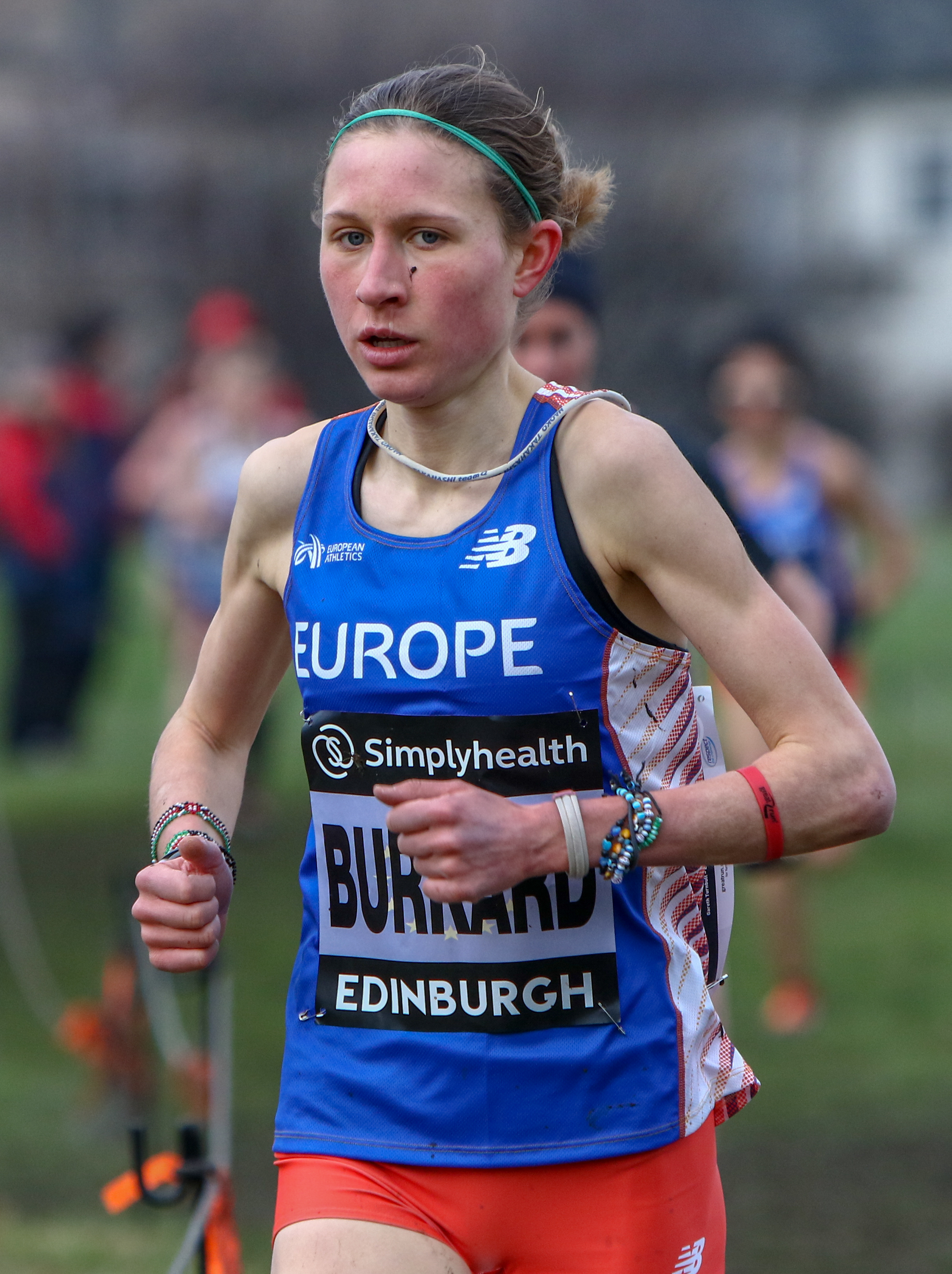
- Elena Burkard in 2018

Personal information
- Born: 10 February 1992 (age 34) Freudenstadt
- Home town: Baiersbronn, Germany
- Education: Richard von Weizsäcker Gymnasium; University of San Francisco; University of Tübingen; Masters of Science Chemistry
- Occupation: Food Scientist

Sport
- Country: Germany
- Sport: Long-distance running
- Club: LG farbtex Northern Black Forest
- Turned pro: 2017
- Coached by: Jörg Müller
Medal record
Women's long-distance running
Representing Germany
German Athletics Championships
Gold medal – first place	2019 Berlin	Cross country 5.1 km
Silver medal – second place	2018 Nuremberg	1500 m

Elena Burkard (born 10 February 1992) is a German long-distance runner. In 2019, she competed in the senior women's race at the 2019 IAAF World Cross Country Championships held in Aarhus, Denmark. She finished in 23rd place. She also competed in the women's 3000 metres steeplechase event at the 2020 Summer Olympics held in Tokyo, Japan.

In 2018, she won the silver medal in the women's 1500 metres at the 2018 German Athletics Championships held in Nuremberg, Germany. In the same year, she also represented Germany at the 2018 European Athletics Championships held in Berlin, Germany. She finished in 6th place in the women's 3000 metres steeplechase with a personal best of 9:29.76. In 2019, she won the gold medal in the women's cross-country 5.1 km event at the 2019 German Athletics Championships held in Berlin, Germany.

== Achievements ==
Year	Competition	Venue	Position	Event	Notes
Representing Germany
2017	European Cross Country Championships	Šamorín, Slovakia	5th	Senior race	27:21
2018	German Athletics Championships	Nürnberg, Germany	2nd	1500 metres	4:06.51
2018	European Athletics Championships	Berlin, Germany	6th	3000 metres steeplechase	9:29.76
2019	World Cross Country Championships	Aarhus, Denmark	23rd	10,000 m	38:26
2019	European Cross Country Championships	Lisbon, Portugal	9th	8,000 m	28:10
2020	German Athletics Championships	Braunschweig, Germany	1st	3000 metres steeplechase	9:50.31
2021	European Athletics Indoor Championships	Toruń, Poland	7th	3000 metres	8:51.09
2021	European Athletics Team Championships Super League	Chorzów, Poland	2nd	3000 metres steeplechase	9:36.04
2021	Summer Olympics	Tokyo, Japan	18th	3000 metres steeplechase	9:30.64
2022	German Athletics Championships	Berlin, Germany	2nd	3000 metres steeplechase	9:50.10
2022	European Athletics Championships	Munich, Germany	12th	3000 metres steeplechase	9:39.63
2022	2022 European Cross Country Championships	Turin, Italy	4th	5.7 km Relay	17:32
2023	German Cross Country Championships	Perl, Saarland, Germany	1st	6.8 km	22:40
2023	European Cross Country Championships	Brussels, Belgium	15th	10 km	36:12
2025	European Running Championships	Leuven, Belgium	10th	10 km	31:52
2025	World Championships	Tokyo, Japan	38th (h)	5000 m	15:37.33

== NCAA ==
Year	Competition	Venue	Position	Event	Notes
representing University of San Francisco
2012	West Coast Conference; Cross Country Championship	Portland, Oregon	2nd	6000 m	20:33.8
2013	2013 NCAA Division I Cross Country Championships	Terre Haute, Indiana	53rd	6000 m	20:55.2
2014	2014 NCAA Division I Outdoor Track and Field Championships	University of Arkansas	27th	5000 metres prelim	16:19.02
2015	2015 NCAA Division I Outdoor Track and Field Championships	University of Texas	94th	1500 metres prelim	4:52.65
2015	West Coast Conference; Cross Country Championship	Spokane Valley, Washington	4th	6000 m	21:16.8
2015	2015 NCAA Division I Cross Country Championships	Louisville, Kentucky	85th	6000 m	20:45.4
2016	West Coast Conference; Cross Country Championship	San Diego, California	7th	6000 m	21:06.4
2016	2016 NCAA Division I Cross Country Championships	Terre Haute, Indiana	62nd	6000 m	20:37.2
2017	2017 NCAA Division I Outdoor Track and Field Championships	University of Texas	42nd	1500 metres prelim	4:31.83
