= Jacqueline Otchere =

German athlete

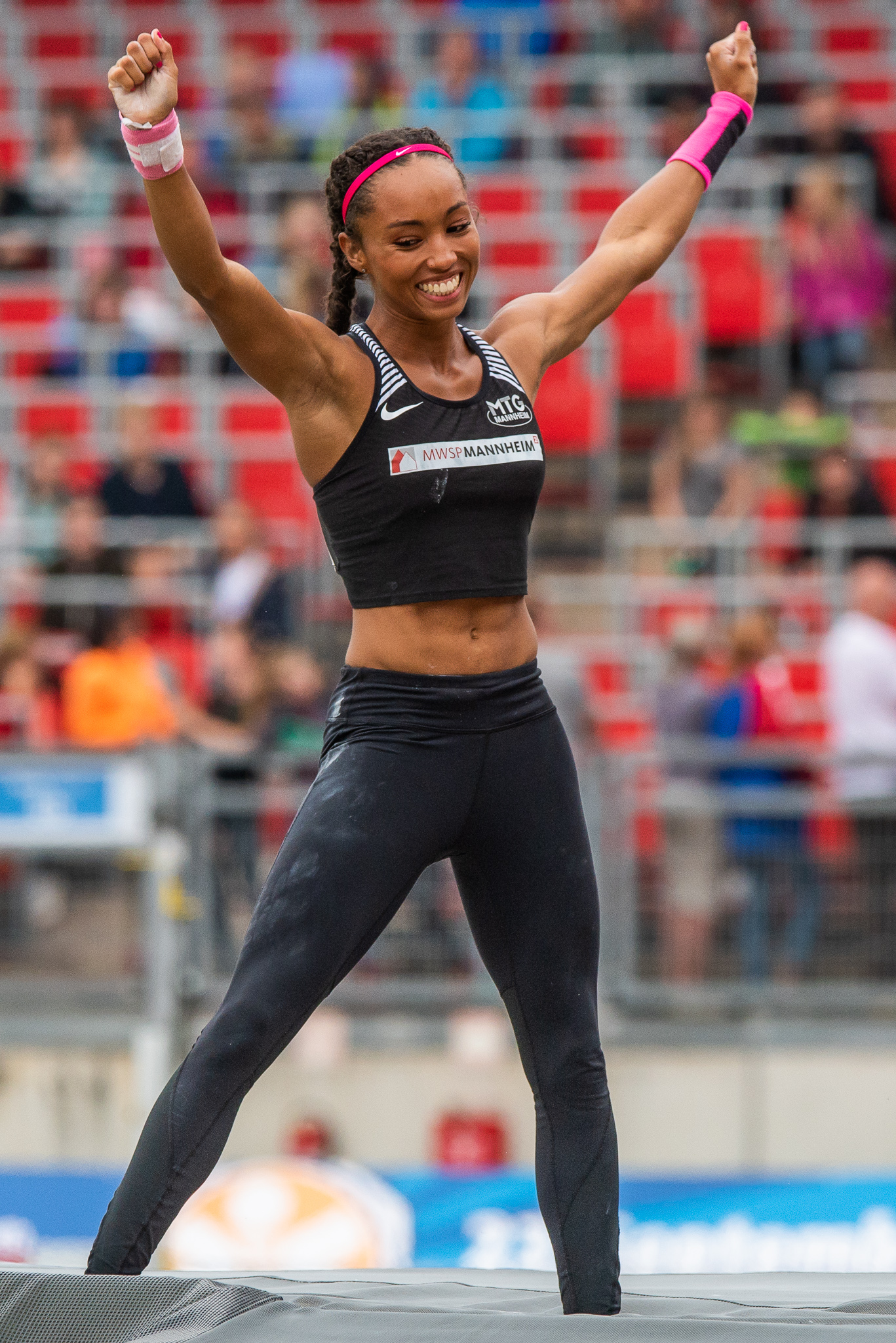
- Otchere in 2018

Personal information
- Nationality: German
- Born: 5 May 1996 (age 30) Heidelberg, Germany
- Height: 1.68 m (5 ft 6 in)

Sport
- Sport: Athletics
- Event: Pole Vault

Achievements and titles
- Personal best(s): Pole Vault: 4.60m (London, 2018)

Jacqueline Otchere (born 5 May 1996) is a German pole vaulter. She is a multiple German champion at the pole vault.

== Career ==
She started athletics at eight years-old and would train with her brothers Julian and Colin at ASV Eppelheim near Heidelberg. She took up the pole vault in 2015.

In June 2018, she won the U23 German Championships in Heilbronn, and represented her country for the first time at the World Cup in London where she set a new personal best clearance of 4.60m. In July 2018, she won her first senior national pole vault title and then was selected for her first major championships, competing at the 2018 European Athletics Championships in Berlin. She cleared a height of 4.35 metres at the championships, but it was not sufficient to progress to the final.

Otchere won her second German pole vault national championship title on 4 June 2021. The following year she claimed her first German national indoor title, winning in Leipzig in February 2022.

Competing at the 2022 World Athletics Championships in Eugene, Oregon, she reached the final with a 4.50m clearance. In the final she finished tenth overall with a 4.45m clearance. She competed at the 2022 European Athletics Championships in Munich in the pole vault, clearing 4.10 metres which was not enough to make the final.

She was selected for the 2024 European Athletics Championships in Rome, Italy, where she cleared a height of 4.40 metres but did progress to the final.

On 8 February 2026, Otchere set a meeting record and equalled her personal best clearing 4.60 metres at the Sparkassen Indoor Meeting Dortmund. She cleared 4.55 metres to win the title at the 2026 German Indoor Athletics Championships in Dortmund.

== Personal life ==
Otchere studied biological sciences at the University of Heidelberg.
