= Samantha Borutta =

German hammer thrower (born 2000)

Personal information
- Nationality: Germany
- Born: 7 August 2000 (age 25) Mannheim, Germany

Sport
- Sport: Athletics

Samantha Borutta (born 7 August 2000) is a German hammer thrower. She competed in the 2020 Summer Olympics.
