= Marvin Schlegel =

German sprinter

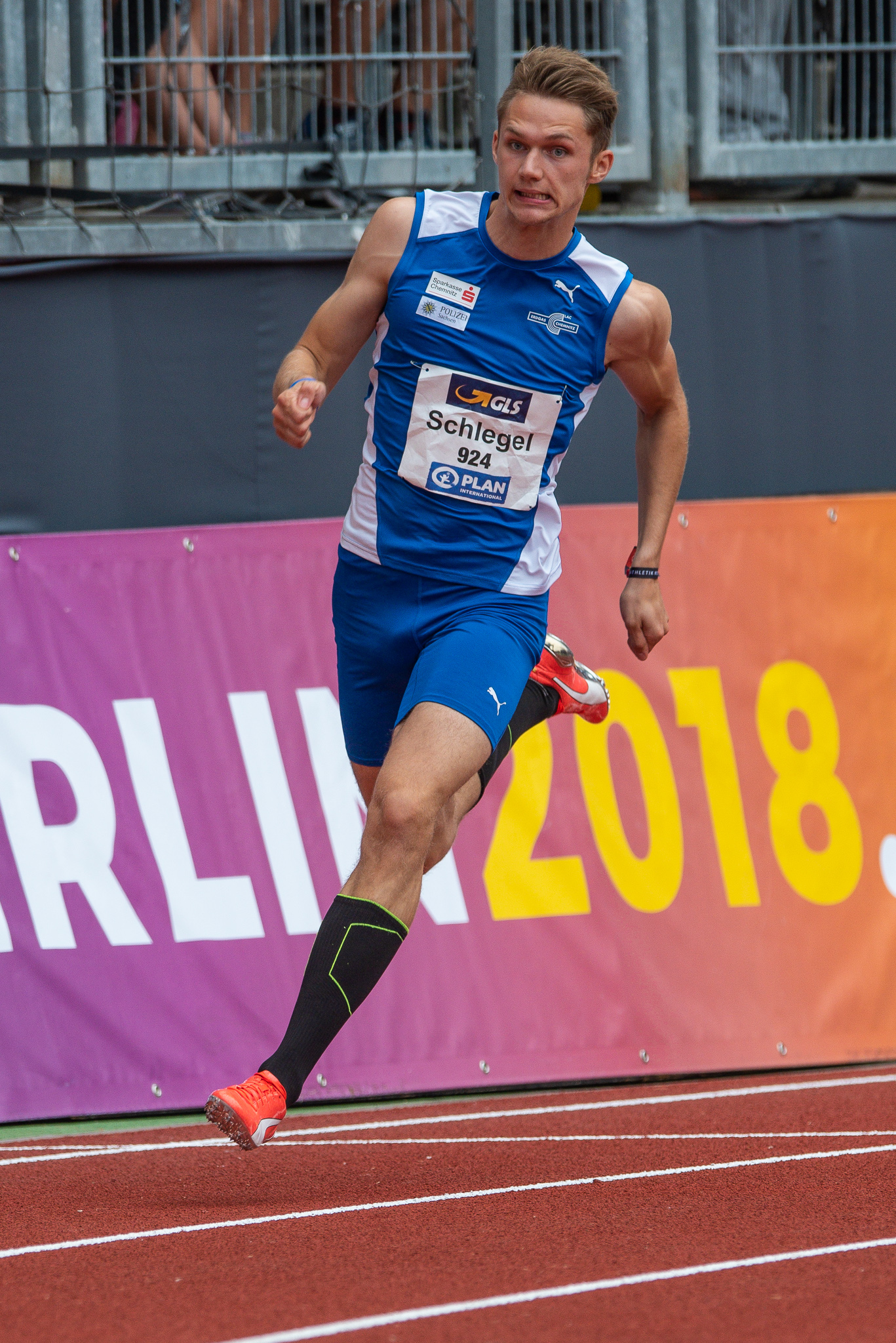
- Schlegel in 2018

Personal information
- Nationality: German
- Born: 2 January 1998 (age 27) Frankenberg, Germany

Sport
- Sport: Athletics
- Event: Sprinting

Marvin Schlegel (born 2 January 1998) is a German track and field athlete who competes as a sprinter. He competed in the mixed 4 × 400 metres relay event at the 2019 World Athletics Championships.

== Personal bests ==
Outdoor

- 200 metres – 20.75 (-0.8 m/s, Dessau 2022)
- 400 metres – 45.76 (Berlin 2022)

Indoor

- 200 metres – 21.20 (Erfurt 2023)
- 400 metres – 46.25 (Dortmund 2023)
