= ASV Köln =

Sports club

Logo

Athletik-Sport-Verein Köln e.V. is a multi-sports club from Cologne, Germany. It has sections for rugby union, athletics, triathlon and karate

== General history ==
The club was formed on 27 February 1929, under the name of Akademischen Sportverein Köln, by students of the University of Cologne. In 1936, it severed its connection to the university and renamed itself to Athletik-Sport-Verein Köln, its current name.

== Athletics ==
Among others, ASV Köln has been a strong high jump club, with German and Olympic champions such as Gustav Weinkötz, Dietmar Mögenburg, Carlo Thränhardt, Marlene Matthei, Marlene Schmitz-Portz and Ulrike Meyfarth and other international jumpers such as Petra Wziontek.
