= Steven Müller =

German sprinter

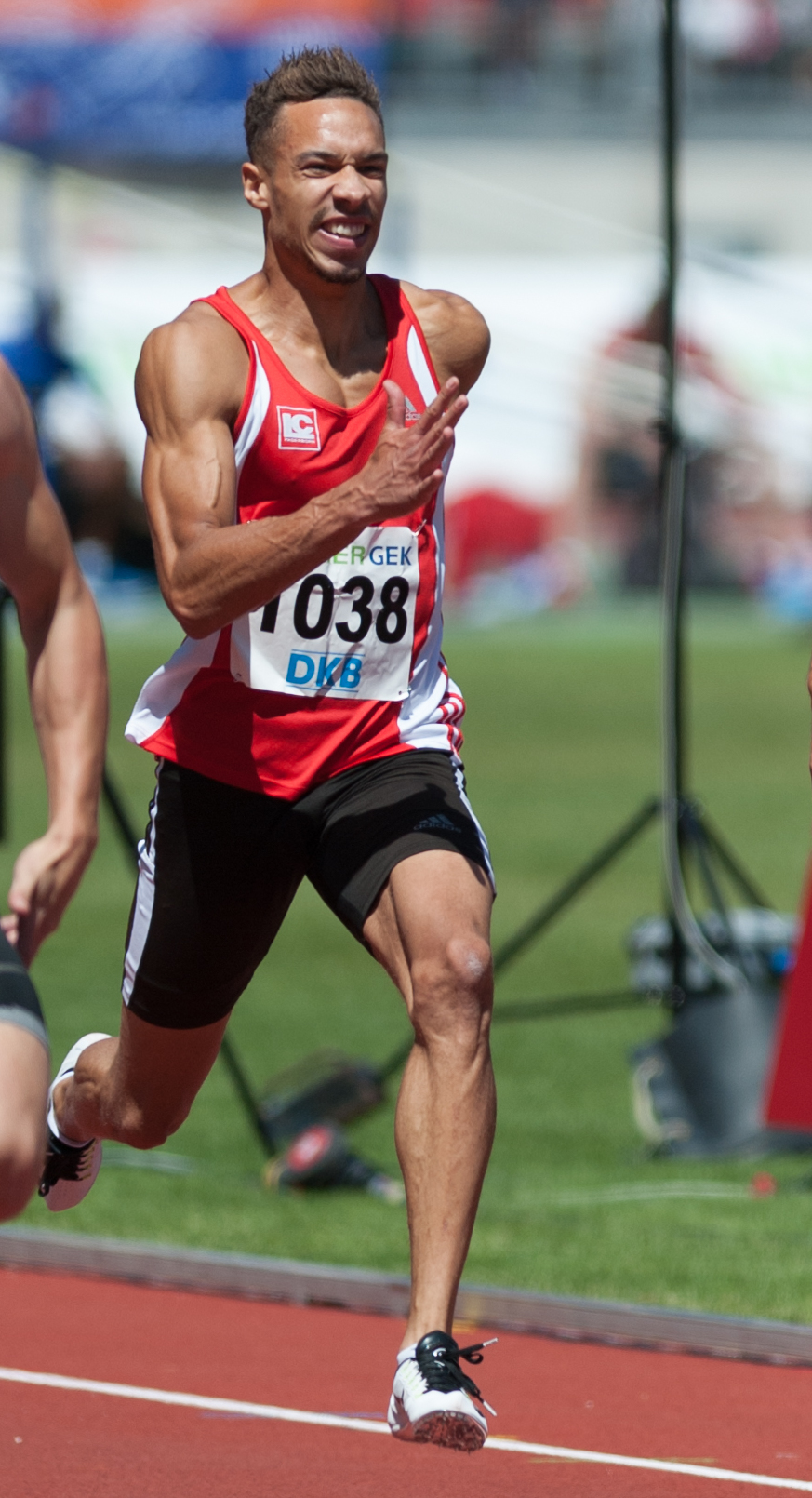
- Steven Müller in 2015

Personal information
- Nationality: German
- Born: 15 September 1990 (age 35)

Sport
- Sport: Athletics
- Event: Sprinting

Steven Müller (born 15 September 1990) is a German track and field athlete. He competed in the men's 200 metres event at the 2019 World Athletics Championships.
