= Carolina Krafzik =

German athletics competitor (born 1995)

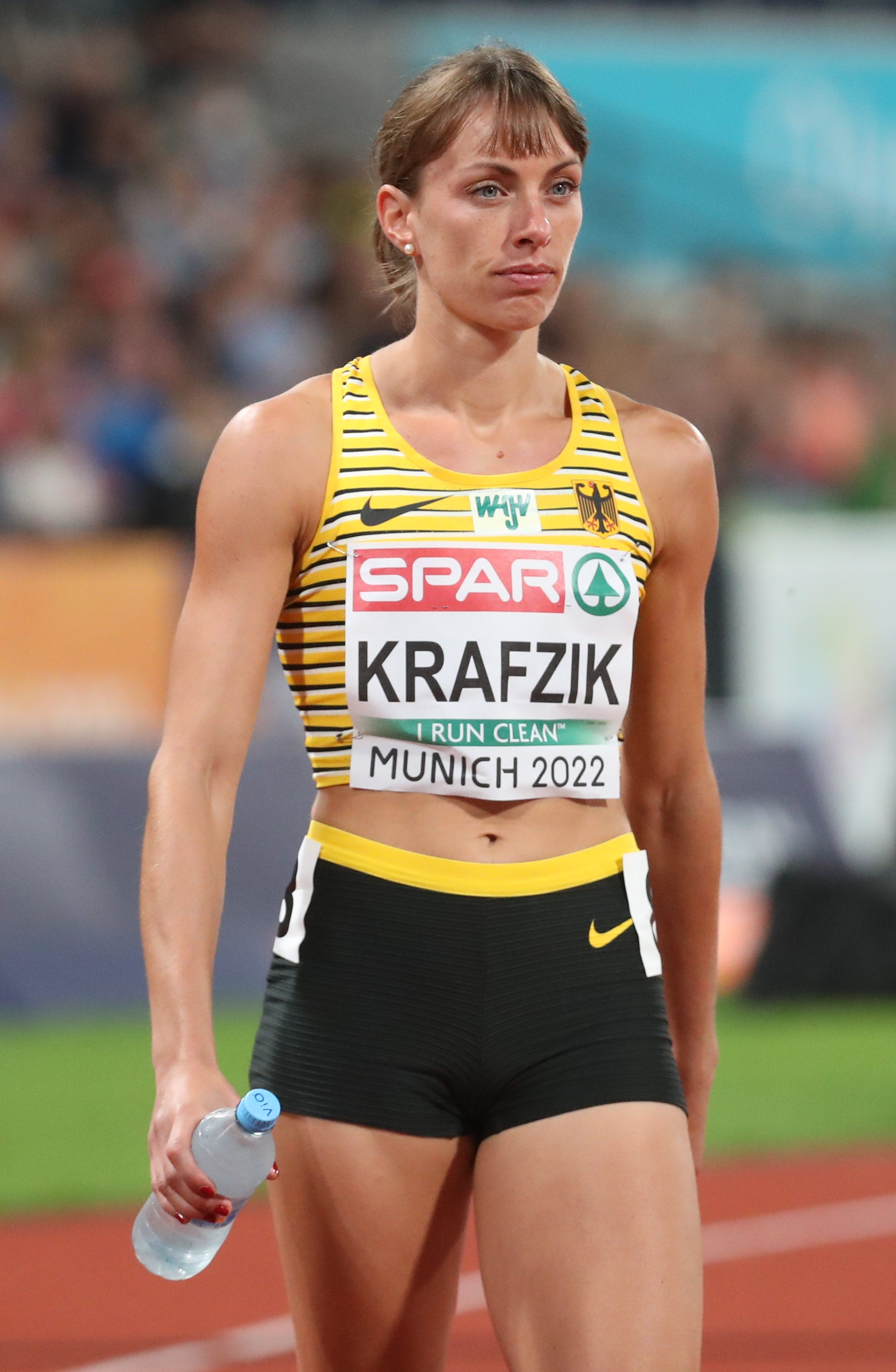
- Krafzik in 2022

Personal information
- Nationality: German
- Born: 27 March 1995 (age 31) Niefern-Öschelbronn, Germany

Sport
- Sport: Athletics
- Events: 400 metres hurdles; 400 metres
Medal record
Women's athletics
Representing Germany
European Games
Gold medal – first place	2023 Kraków–Małopolska	400 m hurdles

Carolina Krafzik (born 27 March 1995) is a German track and field athlete who specializes in the 400 metres hurdles and 400 metres. She represented Germany at the 2019 World Athletics Championships, competing in women's 400 metres hurdles.

She won a gold medal in the 400 metres hurdles at the 2019 German Athletics Championships.
