= Katharina Trost =

German middle-distance runner

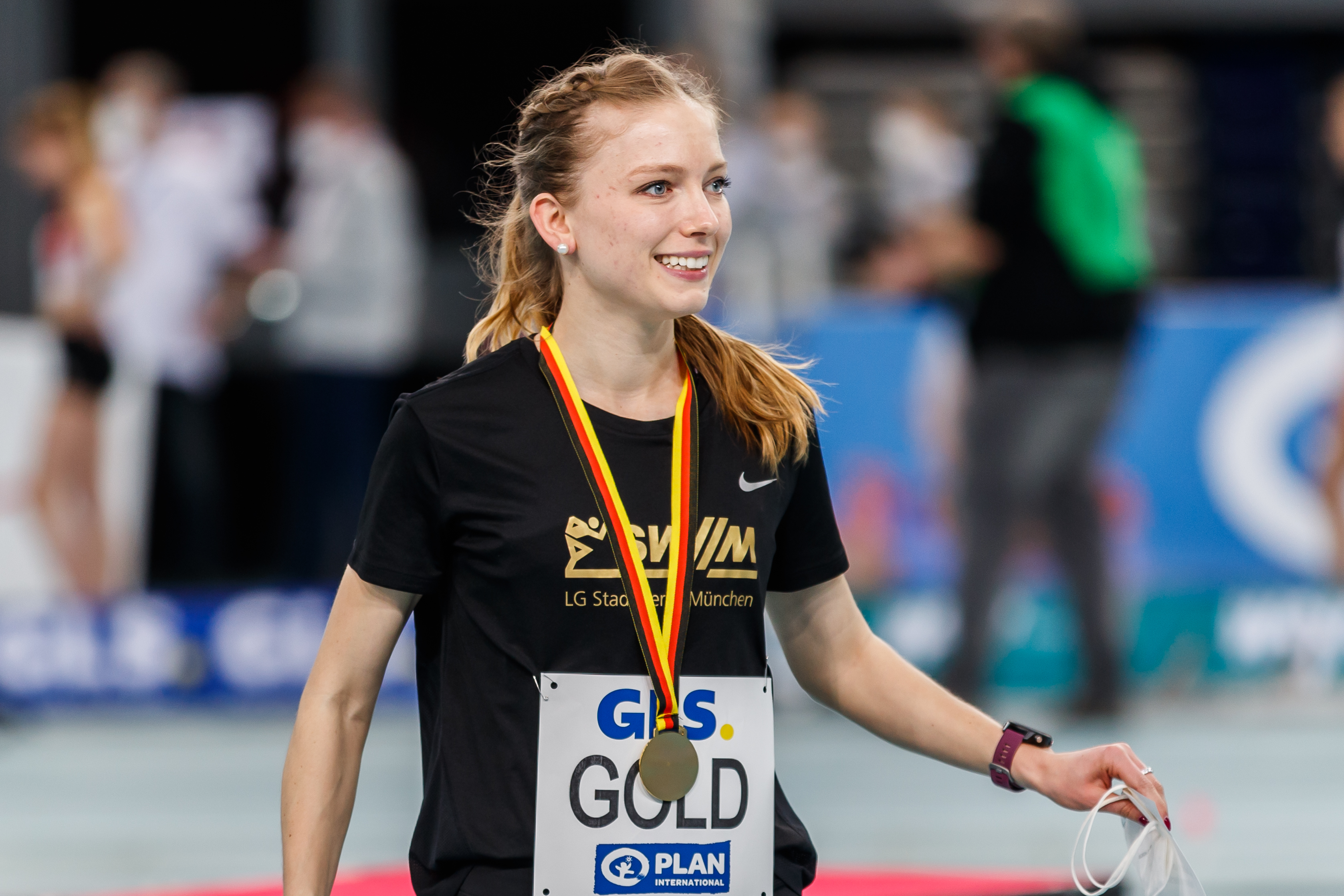

Personal information
- Nationality: German
- Born: 28 June 1995 (age 30) Freilassing, Germany

Sport
- Sport: Athletics
- Events: 800 metres; 1500 metres

Katharina Trost (born 28 June 1995) is a German track and field athlete who specializes in middle-distance running.

At 16, she competed at her first German Championships in the U18 class and took the 2nd place in 800 metres. Representing Germany at the 2019 World Athletics Championships, she reached the semi-finals in women's 800 metres.

== Achievements ==
- Gold medal in 1500 metres at the 2023 German Athletics Championships
- Gold medals in 1500 metres at the 2022 and 2023 German Indoor Athletics Championships
- Gold medal in 800 metres at the 2019 German Indoor Athletics Championships
- Reached semi-finals in 800 metres at the 2020 Summer Olympics
- Reached semi-finals in 1500 metres at the 2022 World Athletics Championships
- Reached semi-finals in 800 metres at the 2019 IAAF World Championships
