= Joshua Abuaku =

German hurdler (born 1996)

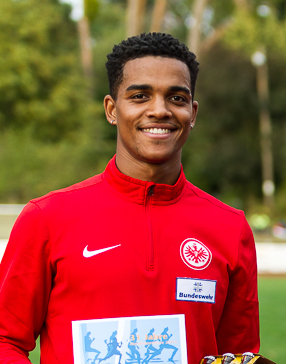
- Joshua Abuaku (2018)

Personal information
- Born: 7 July 1996 (age 30) Oberhausen, Nordrhein-Westfalen, Germany

Sport
- Sport: Athletics
- Event: 400 metres hurdles

Achievements and titles
- Personal best: 400 mH: 48.32 (Budapest 2023)

Joshua Abuaku (born 7 July 1996) is a German hurdler specialising in the 400 metres hurdles.

== Career ==
He won a silver medal at the 2015 European Junior Championships in Eskilstuna, Sweden. He was selected to compete in the 400 metres hurdles at the 2020 Summer Olympics. He ran a season best time of 49.50 to reach the semi-finals.

== Personal life ==
Abuaku is of Ghanaian descent.
