= Samuel Fitwi Sibhatu =

German long-distance runner (born 1996)

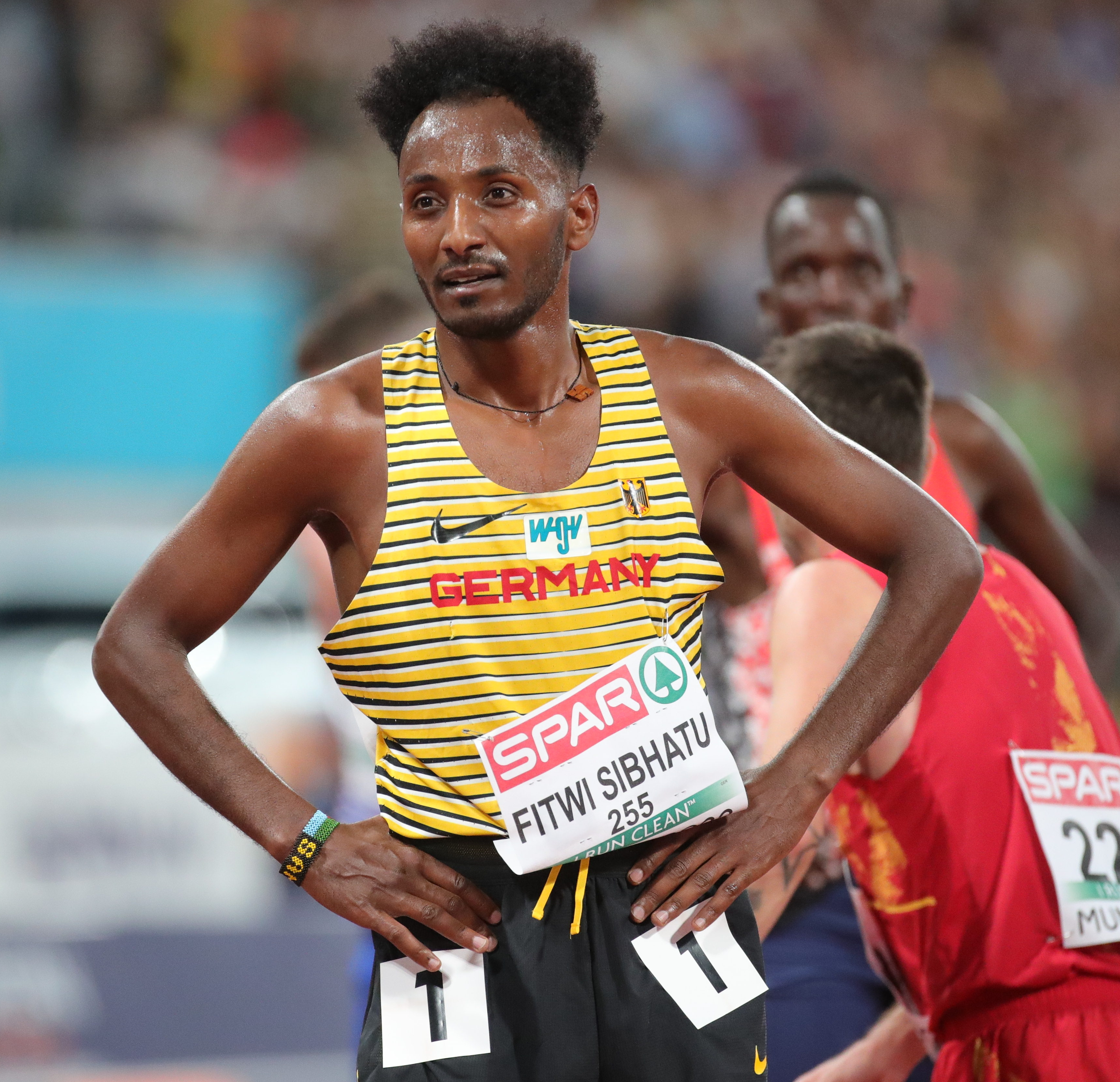
- Fitwi Sibhatu at the 2022 European Championships for the 10,000 Meters race

Personal information
- Nationality: German
- Born: 1 January 1996 (age 30) Eritrea

Sport
- Sport: Athletics
- Event: Long-distance running

Achievements and titles
- Personal best: Marathon: 2:04:45 Hamburg 2026)
Medal record
Men's athletics
Representing Germany
European Championships
Silver medal – second place	2026 Birmingham	Marathon team
Bronze medal – third place	2024 Rome	Half Marathon team

Samuel Fitwi Sibhatu (born 1 January 1996) is a German marathon runner. He won a bronze medal at the 2024 European Athletics Championships and ran at the 2024 Summer Olympics.

== Early life ==
At the age of 17, Sibhatu fled his home country of Eritrea with a group of four peers to Cologne to escape the military regime. After his escape, he was taken in by a family in Stadtkyll, Rhineland-Palatinate.

== Career ==
Having obtained German citizenship in 2018, Sibhatu competed for Germany in the 10,000 meters at the 2022 European Athletics Championships in Munich, where he finished in ninth place with a new personal best time of 28:03.92 minutes.

In 2023, Sibhatu achieved a personal best time of 2:08:28 hours at the Berlin Marathon, this also placed him in fourth place on the German all-time list.

On January 7, 2024, Sibhatu set a new best time of 2:06:27 in finishing fifth in the Dubai Marathon, that time met the qualifying standard for the 2024 Olympic Games.

He won a bronze medal at the 2024 European Athletics Championships in the Men's half marathon team event. In the individual race he placed fifth. He competed at the 2024 Summer Olympics in Paris, placing fifteenth in the marathon in 2:09:50. In December 2024, he ran 2:04:56 for the marathon in Valencia, Spain.

In April 2025, he won the Hannover Marathon in 2:06:29. At the 2026 Hamburg Marathon on 26 April, he finished second behind Moroccan Othmane El Goumri in a lifetime best of 2:04:45, moving to tenth on the European all-time list.
