= Simon Boch =

German long-distance runner (born 1994)

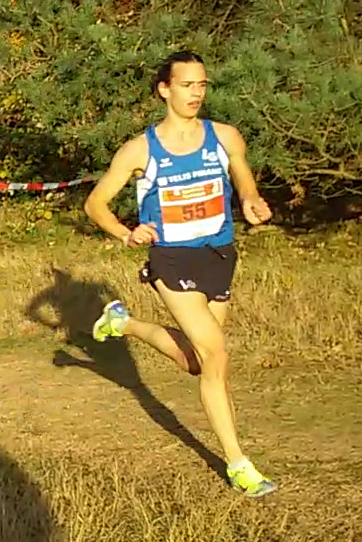
- Simon Boch in 2016

Personal information
- Born: 18 April 1994 (age 32) Donaueschingen, Germany

Sport
- Country: Germany
- Sport: Athletics
- Event: Long-distance running
- Club: Düsseldorf Athletics
Medal record
Men's athletics
German Athletics Championships
Gold medal – first place	2020 Braunschweig	Cross country 4.4 km
Silver medal – second place	2020 Braunschweig	Cross country 9.9 km

Simon Boch (born 18 April 1994) is a German long-distance runner. In 2020, he competed in the men's race at the 2020 World Athletics Half Marathon Championships held in Gdynia, Poland. He finished in 35th place.

In 2019, he competed in the men's event at the 2019 European 10,000m Cup held in London, United Kingdom.

== Achievements ==
Year	Competition	Venue	Position	Event	Notes
Representing Germany
2020	World Championships (HM)	Gdynia, Poland	35th	Half marathon	1:01:36
