= Konstantin Wedel =

German long-distance runner (born 1993)

Personal information
- Born: 22 November 1993 (age 32)

Sport
- Country: Germany
- Sport: Athletics
- Event: Long-distance running
Medal record
Men's athletics
German Athletics Championships
Bronze medal – third place	2020 Braunschweig	Cross country 4.4 km

Konstantin Wedel (born 22 November 1993) is a German long-distance runner. In 2020, he competed in the men's race at the 2020 World Athletics Half Marathon Championships held in Gdynia, Poland.

In 2012, he competed in the men's 3000 metres steeplechase event at the 2012 World Junior Championships in Athletics held in Barcelona, Spain. In 2015, he competed in the men's 3000 metres steeplechase event at the 2015 European Athletics U23 Championships held in Tallinn, Estonia.
