= Deborah Schöneborn =

German long-distance runner (born 1994)

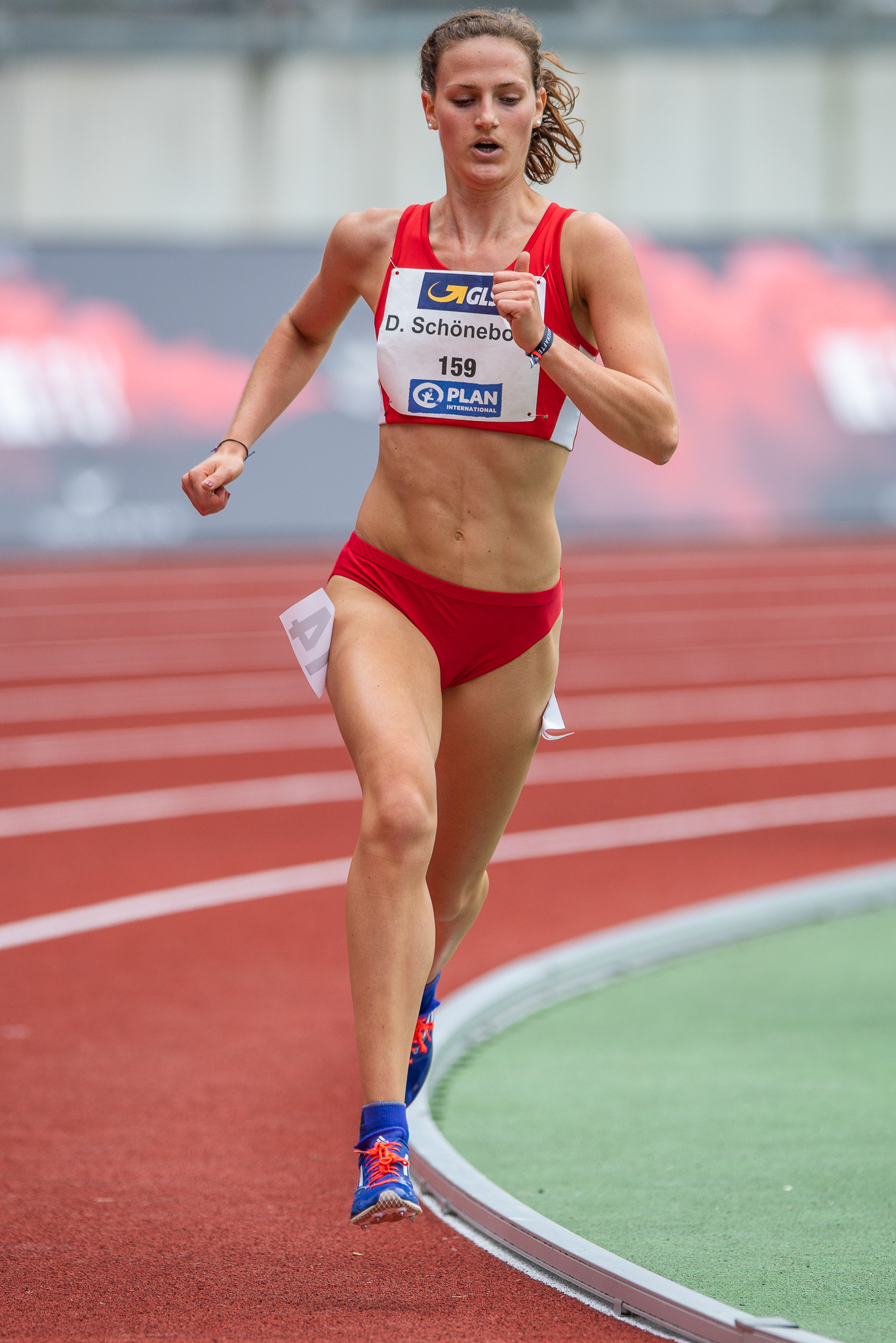
- Deborah Schöneborn in 2018

Personal information
- Born: 13 March 1994 (age 31)

Sport
- Country: Germany
- Sport: Long-distance running

Deborah Schöneborn (born 13 March 1994) is a German long-distance runner. She competed in the women's marathon at the 2020 Summer Olympics held in Tokyo, Japan, finishing as the second best German in the event in 18th place with a time of 2:33:08.

She competed in the women's half marathon at the 2019 Summer Universiade held in Naples, Italy. She finished in 4th place.

In 2020, she competed in the women's half marathon at the World Athletics Half Marathon Championships held in Gdynia, Poland.

== Personal life ==
Her twin sister Rabea Schöneborn is also a long-distance runner.
