= Rabea Schöneborn =

German long-distance runner (born 1994)

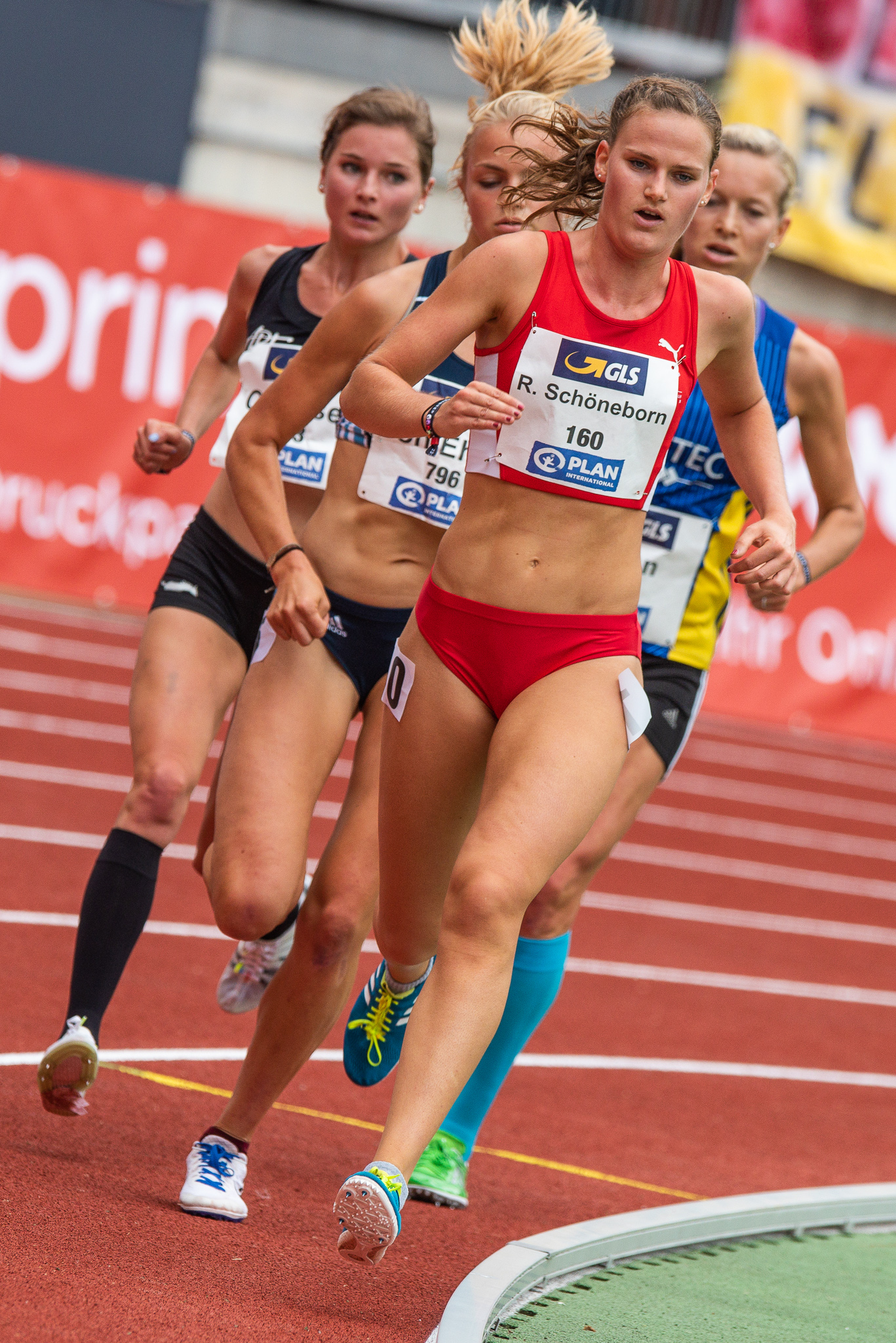
- Rabea Schöneborn in 2018

Personal information
- Born: 13 March 1994 (age 32)
- Education: Humboldt University of Berlin

Sport
- Country: Germany
- Sport: Long-distance running

Rabea Schöneborn (born 13 March 1994) is a German long-distance runner. She competed in the women's half marathon at the 2020 World Athletics Half Marathon Championships held in Gdynia, Poland, running a time of 1:12:35.

In 2019, she competed in the women's half marathon at the Summer Universiade held in Naples, Italy. She did not finish her race.

She is the German national champion in the 10,000 meter run for the year 2021 with a winning time of 32:55.96.

== Personal life ==
Her twin sister Deborah Schöneborn is also a long-distance runner.
