= Israel at the 2026 European Athletics Championships =

- Flag of Israel
- WA code: ISR

in Birmingham, United Kingdom 10–16 August 2026
- Competitors: 18 (13 men and 5 women)
- Medals Ranked 15th: Gold 1 Silver 0 Bronze 1 Total 2

European Athletics Championships appearances
- 1990; 1994; 1998; 2002; 2006; 2010; 2012; 2014; 2016; 2018; 2022; 2024; 2026

Israel competed at the 2026 European Athletics Championships in Birmingham, United Kingdom from 10–16 August 2026.

== Medallists ==
Medal	Name	Event	Date
Gold	Yitayew Abuhay; Haimro Alame; Gashau Ayale; Tadesse Getahon; Bukayawe Malede; Marhu Teferi	Men's Marathon Team	16 August
Bronze	Gashau Ayale	Men's Marathon	16 August

== Results ==
Israel entered the following athletes.

Key

- Q = Qualified for the next round
- q = Qualified for the next round as a fastest loser or, in field events, by position without achieving the qualifying target
- NR = National record
- PB = Personal best
- SB = Season best
- N/A = Round not applicable for the event

Track and road events
Men

Athlete	Event	Heat		Semifinal		Final	
Athlete	Event	Result	Rank	Result	Rank	Result	Rank
Gal Arad	200 m	21.02	14	Did not advance			
Matan Ivri	1500 m	3:36.93	8	—N/a		Did not advance	
Dereje Chekole	10,000 m	—N/a				28:31.28	14
Zemenu Muchie	10,000 m	—N/a				29:26.22	19
Yitayew Abuhay	Marathon	—N/a				2:10:59	12
Haimro Alame	Marathon	—N/a				2:09:45	8
Gashau Ayale	Marathon	—N/a				2:09:21	3rd place, bronze medalist(s)
Tadesse Getahon	Marathon	—N/a				2:09:31	5
Bukayawe Malede	Marathon	—N/a				2:18:37	35
Maru Teferi	Marathon	—N/a				2:13:36	22
Yitayew Abuhay; Haimro Alame; Gashau Ayale; Tadesse Getahon; Bukayawe Malede; Marhu Teferi	Marathon Team	—N/a				6:28:37	1st place, gold medalist(s)
Sagi Lamdiel	110 m hurdles	14.45	21	Did not advance			
Omri Shiff	400 m hurdles	DQ		Did not advance			

Women

Athlete	Event	Heat		Semifinal		Final	
Athlete	Event	Result	Rank	Result	Rank	Result	Rank
Mentamir Bikayla	Marathon	—N/a				2:50:29	46
Selamawit Teferi	Marathon	—N/a				2:28:26	11
Maor Tiyouri	Marathon	—N/a				2:30:17	12
Mentamir Bikayla; Selamawit Teferi; Maor Tiyouri	Marathon Team	—N/a				7:49:12	7
Adva Cohen	3000 m steeplechase	9:37.15	16 Q	—N/a		9:38.21	10

Field events

Athlete	Event	Qualification		Final	
Athlete	Event	Distance	Position	Distance	Position
Yonathan Kapitolnik	Men's high jump	2.23	3 q	2.23	=5
Estel Valeanu	Women's discus throw	51.37	28	Did not advance	
