= 2024 European Half Marathon Cup – Men =

Men's half marathon team at the 2024 European Athletics Championships
- Venue: Stadio Olimpico
- Location: Rome
- Dates: 9 June (final)
- Competitors: 54 from 12 nations
- Winning time: 3:03:34

Medalists
gold medal	Yemaneberhan Crippa; Pietro Riva; Pasquale Selvarolo; Eyob Faniel; Yohanes Chiappinelli; Daniele Meucci	Italy
silver medal	Maru Teferi; Gashau Ayale; Girmaw Amare; Haimro Alame; Godadaw Belachew; Tesema Moges	Israel
bronze medal	Amanal Petros; Samuel Fitwi Sibhatu; Filimon Abraham; Richard Ringer; Simon Boch; Hendrik Pfeiffer	Germany

The 2024 European Half Marathon Cup for men, the second edition of the competition, was held as part of the men's half marathon at the 2024 European Athletics Championships, which took place at the Stadio Olimpico on 9 June.

== Schedule ==
Date	Time	Round
9 June 2024	09:00	Final

All times are local times (UTC+2)

== Results ==
Rank	Nation	Athletes	Time
1st place, gold medalist(s)	Italy	Yemaneberhan Crippa, Pietro Riva, Pasquale Selvarolo, Eyob Faniel, Yohanes Chiappanelli, Daniele Meucci	3:03:34
2nd place, silver medalist(s)	Israel	Maru Teferi, Gashau Ayale, Girmaw Amare, Haimro Alame, Godadaw Belachew, Tesema Mogess	3:04:09
3rd place, bronze medalist(s)	Germany	Amanal Petros, Samuel Fitwi Sibhatu, Filimon Abraham, Richard Ringer, Simon Boch, Hendrik Pfeiffer	3:05:33
4	Spain	Jorge Gonzalez Rivera, Carlos Mayo, Yago Rojo, Javier Guerra, Jorge Blanco, Ibrahim Chakir	3:06:44
5	Belgium	Simon Debognies, Dorian Boulvin, Michael Somers	3:08:50
6	Norway	Sondre Nordstad Moen, Zerei Kbrom Mezngi, Weldu Negash Gebretsadik, Awet Nftalem Kibrab	3:11:29
7	France	Felix Bour, Emmanuel Roudolff, Benjamin Choquert, Nicolas Navarro	3:11:48
8	Switzerland	Matthias Kyburz, Tadesse Abraham, Patrik Wägeli, Julien Wanders	3:14:03
9	Austria	Timo Hinterndorfer, Andreas Vojta, Peter Herzog, Mario Bauernfeind, Dominik Stadlmann	3:16:12
10	Estonia	Tiidrek Nurme, Leonid Latsepov, Olavi Allase	3:19:57
	Portugal	Rui Pinto, Miguel Borges, Hélio Gomes, Samuel Barata	DNF
	Turkey	Ilham Tanui Özbilen, Sezgin Ataç, Polat Kemboi Arıkan	DNF

== See also ==
- 2024 European Athletics Championships – Men's half marathon
