= Israel at the 2024 European Athletics Championships =

- Flag of Israel
- WA code: ISR
- National federation: Israeli Athletic Association

in Rome, Italy 7 June 2024 – 12 June 2024
- Competitors: 19 (14 men and 5 women) in 8 events
- Medals Ranked 23rd: Gold 0 Silver 1 Bronze 0 Total 1

European Athletics Championships appearances
- 1990; 1994; 1998; 2002; 2006; 2010; 2012; 2014; 2016; 2018; 2022; 2024; 2026

Israel competed at the 2024 European Athletics Championships in Rome, Italy, from 7-12 June 2024

== Medallists ==
Medal	Name	Event	Date
Silver	Haimro Alame; Girmaw Amare; Gashau Ayale; Godadaw Belachew; Tesema Moges; Marhu Teferi	Half Marathon Cup	9 June

== Results ==
Israel entered the following athletes.

Key

- Q = Qualified for the next round
- q = Qualified for the next round as a fastest loser or, in field events, by position without achieving the qualifying target
- NR = National record
- PB = Personal best
- SB = Season best
- N/A = Round not applicable for the event

=== Men ===
Track and road events

Athlete	Event	Heat		Semifinal		Final	
Athlete	Event	Result	Rank	Result	Rank	Result	Rank
Blessing Afrifah	200 metres	Bye		20.46 SB	6 Q	20.97	7
Yitayew Abuhay	10,000 metres	—N/a				29:05.32	33
Dereje Chekole	10,000 metres	—N/a				28:30.93	22
Tadesse Getahon	10,000 metres	—N/a				28:09.87	7
Bukayawe Malede	10,000 metres	—N/a				29:27.90	36
Adisu Guadia	10,000 metres	—N/a				28:42.39	29
Haimro Alame	Half marathon	—N/a				1:02:38 =PB	18
Girmaw Amare	Half marathon	—N/a				1:01:31 PB	9
Gashau Ayale	Half marathon	—N/a				1:01:28 PB	7
Godadaw Belachew	Half marathon	—N/a				1:02:53 SB	20
Tesema Moges	Half marathon	—N/a				1:06:06 SB	48
Marhu Teferi	Half marathon	—N/a				1:01:10 SB	4
Haimro Alame; Girmaw Amare; Gashau Ayale; Godadaw Belachew; Tesema Moges; Marhu Teferi	Half Marathon Cup	—N/a				3:04:09	2nd place, silver medalist(s)

Field events

Athlete	Event	Qualification		Final	
Athlete	Event	Distance	Position	Distance	Position
Yonathan Kapitolnik	High jump	2.21	=1 q	2.17	12
Ishay Ifraimov	Long jump	7.35	28	Did not advance	

=== Women ===
Track and road events

Athlete	Event	Heat		Semifinal		Final	
Athlete	Event	Result	Rank	Result	Rank	Result	Rank
Sivan Auerbach	1500 metres	4:16.15	25	—N/a		Did not advance	
Lonah Chemtai Salpeter	Half Marathon	—N/a				1:10:28 SB	9
Maor Tiyouri	Half Marathon	—N/a				1:12:55	37
Adva Cohen	3000 metres steeplechase	9:35.41 SB	15 Q	—N/a		9:33.88 SB	12

Field events

Athlete	Event	Qualification		Final	
Athlete	Event	Distance	Position	Distance	Position
Hanna Knyazyeva-Minenko	Triple jump	NM		Did not advance	
