= 2026 European Athletics Championships – Men's marathon =

Men's marathon at the 2026 European Athletics Championships
- Venue: Alexander Stadium
- Location: Birmingham, United Kingdom
- Dates: 16 August 2026
- Competitors: 60 (target)
- Winning time: 2:09:11 CR

Medalists
gold medal	Amanal Petros	Germany
silver medal	Pietro Riva	Italy
bronze medal	Gashau Ayale	Israel

The men's marathon at the 2026 European Athletics Championships took place in Birmingham, United Kingdom, on 16 August 2026.

== Background ==
Records before the 2026 European Athletics Championships
Record	Athlete (nation)	Time	Location	Date
World record	Sebastian Sawe (KEN)	1:59.30	London, United Kingdom	26 April 2026
World leading	Sebastian Sawe (KEN)	1:59.30	London, United Kingdom	26 April 2026
Championship record	Koen Naert (BEL)	2:09:51	Berlin, Germany	12 August 2018
European record	Bashir Abdi (BEL)	2:03.36	Rotterdam, Netherlands	24 October 2021
European leading	Bashir Abdi (BEL)	2:04.19	Rotterdam, Netherlands	12 April 2026

== Qualification ==
For the men's marathon, the qualification period was from 27 January 2025 to 26 July 2026. Athletes qualified by running the entry standard of 2:09.30 or faster, by wildcard for the 2022 European Athletics Champion (in 2024 this event was not held), or by their position on the World Athletics Rankings for the event. The target number was 60 athletes; eventually 64 competitors qualified.

Qualification standings per 31 July 2026
QP	CP	Country	Athlete	Status	Details
1	1	Germany	Richard Ringer	Qualified by Wild Card	Defending European Champion
2	2	Germany	Amanal Petros	Qualified by Entry Standard	2:04:03 - Valencia (ESP) - 07 DEC 2025
3	3	Germany	Samuel Fitwi Sibhatu	Qualified by Entry Standard	2:04:45 - Hamburg (GER) - 26 APR 2026
4	1	Israel	Gashau Ayale	Qualified by Entry Standard	2:05:29 - Valencia (ESP) - 07 DEC 2025
5	1	Sweden	Suldan Hassan	Qualified by Entry Standard	2:05:57 - Tokyo (JPN) - 02 MAR 2025
6	1	France	Emmanuel Roudolff Levisse	Qualified by Entry Standard	2:05:58 - Paris (FRA) - 12 APR 2026
7	1	Turkey	Kaan Kigen Özbilen	Qualified by Entry Standard	2:05:59 - Barcelona (ESP) - 15 MAR 2026
8	1	Great Britain & N.I.	Mahamed Mahamed	Qualified by Entry Standard	2:06:14 - London (GBR) - 26 APR 2026
9	2	France	Félix Bour	Qualified by Entry Standard	2:06:41 - Valencia (ESP) - 07 DEC 2025
10	1	Italy	Pietro Riva	Qualified by Entry Standard	2:06:46 - Rotterdam (NED) - 12 APR 2026
11	2	Israel	Maru Teferi	Qualified by Entry Standard	2:06:46 - Green Point Stadium, Cape Town (RSA) - 24 MAY 2026
12	1	Switzerland	Matthias Kyburz	Qualified by Entry Standard	2:06:48 - Sevilla (ESP) - 23 FEB 2025
13	2	Sweden	Samuel Tsegay Tesfamariam	Qualified by Entry Standard	2:06:51 - Osaka (JPN) - 22 FEB 2026
14	2	Great Britain & N.I.	Weynay Ghebresilasie	Qualified by Entry Standard	2:06:59 - London (GBR) - 26 APR 2026
15	3	Israel	Tadesse Getahon	Qualified by Entry Standard	2:07:15 - Amsterdam (NED) - 19 OCT 2025
16	1	Spain	Ibrahim Chakir	Qualified by Entry Standard	2:07:21 - Valencia (ESP) - 07 DEC 2025
17	4	Israel	Yitayew Abuhay	Qualified by Entry Standard	2:07:26 - Sevilla (ESP) - 23 FEB 2025
18	3	Sweden	Ebba Tulu Chala	Qualified by Entry Standard	2:07:38 - Sevilla (ESP) - 23 FEB 2025
19	5	Israel	Bukayawe Malede	Qualified by Entry Standard	2:07:38 - Sevilla (ESP) - 15 FEB 2026
20	3	France	Hassan Chahdi	Qualified by Entry Standard	2:07:43 - Berlin (GER) - 21 SEP 2025
21	4	France	Valentin Gondouin	Qualified by Entry Standard	2:07:54 - Valencia (ESP) - 07 DEC 2025
22	2	Spain	Jorge González Rivera	Qualified by Entry Standard	2:08:34 - Valencia (ESP) - 07 DEC 2025
23	3	Spain	Ilias Fifa	Qualified by Entry Standard	2:08:36 - Sevilla (ESP) - 15 FEB 2026
24	2	Italy	Ahmed Ouhda	Qualified by Entry Standard	2:08:37 - Sevilla (ESP) - 15 FEB 2026
25	3	Great Britain & N.I.	Jonathan Mellor	Qualified by Entry Standard	2:08:45 - Valencia (ESP) - 07 DEC 2025
26	4	Spain	Carlos Mayo	Qualified by Entry Standard	2:08:53 - Valencia (ESP) - 07 DEC 2025
27	4	Germany	Simon Boch	Qualified by Entry Standard	2:08:55 - Valencia (ESP) - 07 DEC 2025
28	5	Spain	Fernando Carro	Qualified by Entry Standard	2:09:07 - Valencia (ESP) - 07 DEC 2025
29	1	Ireland	Paul O'Donnell	Qualified by Entry Standard	2:09:19 - Sevilla (ESP) - 15 FEB 2026
30	6	Israel	Haimro Alame	Qualified by Entry Standard	2:09:27 - Brussels-Leuven (BEL) - 13 APR 2025
31	6	Spain	Jorge Blanco	Qualified by Entry Standard	2:09:27 - Valencia (ESP) - 07 DEC 2025
32	3	Italy	Badr Jaafari	Qualified by World Rankings	52nd - 1137 points
33	4	Great Britain & N.I.	Tewelde Menges	Qualified by World Rankings	58th - 1132 points
34	1	Belgium	Robin Hendrix	Qualified by World Rankings	60th - 1130 points
35	2	Ireland	Ryan Creech	Qualified by World Rankings	61st - 1130 points
36	1	North Macedonia	Dario Ivanovski	Qualified by World Rankings	62nd - 1128 points
37	5	Germany	Tom Thurley	Qualified by World Rankings	66th - 1125 points
38	4	Italy	Daniele Meucci	Qualified by World Rankings	73rd - 1116 points
39	3	Ireland	David McGlynn	Qualified by World Rankings	76th - 1114 points
40	5	Great Britain & N.I.	Ellis Cross	Qualified by World Rankings	81st - 1108 points
41	5	Italy	Xavier Chevrier	Qualified by World Rankings	82nd - 1106 points
42	6	Germany	Erik Hille	Qualified by World Rankings	84th - 1102 points
43	1	Romania	Nicolae Alexandru Soare	Qualified by World Rankings	86th - 1100 points
44	1	Hungary	Ádám Lomb	Qualified by World Rankings	91st - 1093 points
45	2	Belgium	Yohan Zaradzki	Qualified by World Rankings	92nd - 1093 points
46	2	Switzerland	Patrik WäGeli	Qualified by World Rankings	95th - 1087 points
47	4	Sweden	Archie Casteel	Qualified by World Rankings	106th - 1074 points
48	1	Norway	Sjur Prestsæter	Qualified by World Rankings	115th - 1060 points
49	3	Belgium	Joris Keppens	Qualified by World Rankings	118th - 1057 points
50	4	Belgium	Vincent Bierinckx	Qualified by World Rankings	120th - 1053 points
51	1	Iceland	Hlynur Andrésson	Qualified by World Rankings	125th - 1048 points
52	2	Hungary	Levente Szemerei	Qualified by World Rankings	126th - 1046 points
53	1	Austria	Andreas Vojta	Qualified by World Rankings	129th - 1045 points
54	1	Denmark	Martin Egebjerg Olesen	Qualified by World Rankings	139th - 1036 points
55	2	Norway	Erik Lomås	Qualified by World Rankings	142nd - 1035 points
56	5	Belgium	Nathan Sevenois	Qualified by World Rankings	148th - 1030 points
57	1	Estonia	Tiidrek Nurme	Qualified by World Rankings	152nd - 1027 points
58	1	Portugal	Carlos Costa	Qualified by World Rankings	153rd - 1026 points
59	6	Italy	René Cunéaz	Qualified by World Rankings	160th - 1019 points
60	3	Norway	Eivind Øygard	Qualified by World Rankings	169th - 1017 points
61	1	Greece	Georgios Stamoulis	Qualified by World Rankings	198th - 1001 points
62	2	Denmark	Jacob Dahl	Qualified by World Rankings	200th - 1000 points
63	2	Estonia	Karel Hussar	Qualified by World Rankings	212th - 996 points
64	3	Hungary	László Tarnai	Qualified by World Rankings	437th - 914 points

Bye to semi-finals	Reserve activated	Withdrawal / reserve unused

== Schedule ==
Date	Time	Round
16 August 2026	8:10	Final

All times are local times (UTC+1)

== Results ==
Place	Athlete	Nation	Time	Notes
1st place, gold medalist(s)	Amanal Petros	Germany	2:09:11	CR
2nd place, silver medalist(s)	Pietro Riva	Italy	2:09:18	
3rd place, bronze medalist(s)	Gashau Ayale	Israel	2:09:21	
4	Suldan Hassan	Sweden	2:09:24	
5	Tadesse Getahon	Israel	2:09:31	SB
6	Valentin Gondouin	France	2:09:34	SB
7	Mahamed Mahamed	Great Britain & N.I.	2:09:43	
8	Haimro Alame	Israel	2:09:45	SB
9	Samuel Fitwi Sibhatu	Germany	2:09:47	
10	Richard Ringer	Germany	2:10:05	SB
11	Emmanuel Roudolff-Levisse	France	2:10:34	
12	Yitayew Abuhay	Israel	2:10:59	
13	Ebba Tulu Chala	Sweden	2:11:06	
14	Jorge González Rivera	Spain	2:11:10	SB
15	Carlos Mayo	Spain	2:11:27	SB
16	Ilias Fifa	Spain	2:11:33	
17	Matthias Kyburz	Switzerland	2:11:42	
18	Ahmed Ouhda	Italy	2:11:45	
19	Hassan Chahdi	France	2:12:04	SB
20	Ibrahim Chakir	Spain	2:12:28	SB
21	Simon Boch	Germany	2:12:55	SB
22	Maru Teferi	Israel	2:13:36	
23	Daniele Meucci	Italy	2:14:33	SB
24	Jorge Blanco	Spain	2:14:55	SB
25	Vincent Bierinckx	Belgium	2:15:32	SB
26	Andreas Vojta	Austria	2:15:34	
27	Ádám Lomb	Hungary	2:16:15	
28	Erik Hille	Germany	2:16:22	
29	Nathan Sevenois	Belgium	2:16:34	SB
30	Sjur Prestsæter	Norway	2:17:02	
31	Tiidrek Nurme	Estonia	2:18:18	SB
32	Xavier Chevrier	Italy	2:18:21	
33	Levente Szemerei	Hungary	2:18:27	
34	Martin Egebjerg Olesen	Denmark	2:18:28	SB
35	Bukayawe Malede	Israel	2:18:37	
36	Patrik Wägeli	Switzerland	2:18:38	
37	Tom Thurley	Germany	2:18:56	
38	Yohan Zaradzki	Belgium	2:18:58	
39	Karel Hussar	Estonia	2:19:42	
40	Tewelde Menges	Great Britain & N.I.	2:19:45	
41	Georgios Stamoulis	Greece	2:20:21	SB
42	Eivind Øygard	Norway	2:20:40	SB
43	Paul O'Donnell	Ireland	2:20:41	
44	Fernando Carro	Spain	2:21:14	SB
45	Hlynur Andrésson	Iceland	2:22:09	
46	Dario Ivanovski	North Macedonia	2:22:39	
47	Archie Casteel	Sweden	2:23:34	
48	Carlos Costa	Portugal	2:23:41	
49	Jacob Dahl	Denmark	2:27:04	
50	Jonathan Mellor	Great Britain & N.I.	2:27:56	SB
51	László Tarnai	Hungary	2:30:12	SB
52	Erik Lomås	Norway	2:33:33	
—	Kaan Kigen Özbilen	Turkey	DNF	
—	Félix Bour	France	DNF	
—	Nicolae Alexandru Soare	Romania	DNF	
—	David McGlynn	Ireland	DNF	
—	Samuel Tsegay	Sweden	DNF	
—	Weynay Ghebresilasie	Great Britain & N.I.	DNF	
—	Badr Jaafari	Italy	DNF	
