= Israel at the 2022 European Athletics Championships =

- Flag of Israel
- WA code: ISR
- National federation: Israeli Athletic Association

in Munich, Germany 15 August 2022 – 21 August 2022
- Competitors: 15 (9 men and 6 women) in 11 events
- Medals Ranked 15th: Gold 1 Silver 1 Bronze 3 Total 5

European Athletics Championships appearances
- 1990; 1994; 1998; 2002; 2006; 2010; 2012; 2014; 2016; 2018; 2022; 2024

Israel competed at the 2022 European Athletics Championships in Munich, Germany, between 15 and 21 August 2022

== Medallists ==
Medal	Name	Event	Date
Gold	Girmaw Amare; Gashau Ayale; Yimer Getahun; Bukayawe Malede; Omer Ramon; Maru Teferi	Marathon Cup	15 August
Silver	Marhu Teferi	Men's marathon	15 August
Bronze	Gashau Ayale	Men's marathon	15 August
Bronze	Lonah Chemtai Salpeter	Women's 10,000 metres	16 August
Bronze	Hanna Knyazyeva-Minenko	Women's triple jump	19 August

== Results ==
Israel entered the following athletes.

Key

- Q = Qualified for the next round
- q = Qualified for the next round as a fastest loser or, in field events, by position without achieving the qualifying target
- NR = National record
- PB = Personal best
- SB = Season best
- N/A = Round not applicable for the event

=== Men ===
Track and road events

Athlete	Event	Heat		Semifinal		Final	
Athlete	Event	Result	Rank	Result	Rank	Result	Rank
Blessing Afrifah	200 metres	Bye		20.34	5 q	20.69	7
Tadesse Getahon	10,000 metres	—				28:04.37 PB	10
Girmaw Amare	Marathon	—				2:11:32	9
Gashau Ayale	Marathon	—				2:10:29 SB	3rd place, bronze medalist(s)
Yimer Getahun	Marathon	—				2:10:56 SB	7
Bukayawe Malede	Marathon	—				DNF	
Omer Ramon	Marathon	—				2:16:35	26
Marhu Teferi	Marathon	—				2:10:23	2nd place, silver medalist(s)
Girmaw Amare; Gashau Ayale; Yimer Getahun; Bukayawe Malede; Omer Ramon; Maru Teferi	Marathon Cup	—				6:31:48	1st place, gold medalist(s)

Field events

Athlete	Event	Qualification		Final	
Athlete	Event	Distance	Position	Distance	Position
Yonathan Kapitolnik	High jump	2.17	8	did not advance	

=== Women ===
Track and road events

Athlete	Event	Heat		Semifinal		Final	
Athlete	Event	Result	Rank	Result	Rank	Result	Rank
Diana Vaisman	100 metres	Bye		11.36	9	did not advance	
Selamawit Teferi	5000 metres	—				15:14.36 SB	8
Selamawit Teferi	10,000 metres	—				31:24.03	5
Lonah Chemtai Salpeter	10,000 metres	—				30:46.37 NR	3rd place, bronze medalist(s)
Maor Tiyouri	Marathon	—				2:38:04	28
Adva Cohen	3000 metres steeplechase	9:39.99	6 Q	—		9:36.84	8

Field events

Athlete	Event	Qualification		Final	
Athlete	Event	Distance	Position	Distance	Position
Hanna Knyazyeva-Minenko	Triple jump	14.06	6 q	14.45	3rd place, bronze medalist(s)
