= Israel at the 2016 European Athletics Championships =

- WA code: ISR
- National federation: IAA
- Website: www.iaa.co.il

in Amsterdam
- Competitors: 17 (11 men and 6 women) in 12 events
- Medals Ranked 24th: Gold 0 Silver 1 Bronze 0 Total 1

European Athletics Championships appearances
- 1990; 1994; 1998; 2002; 2006; 2010; 2012; 2014; 2016; 2018; 2022; 2024

Israel competed at the 2016 European Athletics Championships in Amsterdam, Netherlands, between 6 and 10 July 2016.

== Medals ==
Medal	Name	Event	Date
Silver	Hanna Knyazyeva-Minenko	Women's triple jump	10 July

== Results ==
Men

Track & road events

Event	Athletes	Heats		Semifinal		Final	
Event	Athletes	Result	Rank	Result	Rank	Result	Rank
400 m	Donald Sanford	Bye		45.90	13	Did not advance	
10000 m	Aimeru Alemya	—				DNF	
10000 m	Girmaw Amare	—				DQ	
400 m hurdles	Maor Szeged	52.52	23	Did not advance			
3000 m steeplechase	Noam Nee'man	9:15.80	24	—		Did not advance	
Half Marathon	Yimer Getahun	—				1:07:02 SB	43
Half Marathon	Maru Teferi	—				1:07:40	56
Half Marathon	Wuve Brihun	—				1:09:11	70
Half Marathon	Ageze Guadie	—				1:10:45	78
Half Marathon	Israeli team	—				3:23:53	15

Field Events

Event	Athletes	Qualification		Final	
Event	Athletes	Result	Rank	Result	Rank
High Jump	Dmitry Kroyter	2.23 =SB	=13	Did not advance	
Hammer Throw	Oleksandr Drygol	68.10 NR	24	Did not advance	

Women

Track & road events

Event	Athletes	Heats		Semifinal		Final	
Event	Athletes	Result	Rank	Result	Rank	Result	Rank
200 m	Olga Lenskiy	23.90	23	Did not advance			
Half Marathon	Lonah Chemtai Salpeter	—				1:15:22	40
Half Marathon	Yelena Dolinin	—				1:16:44 PB	52

Field Events

Event	Athletes	Qualification		Final	
Event	Athletes	Result	Rank	Result	Rank
High Jump	Ma'ayan Shahaf	1.80	25	Did not advance	
Triple Jump	Hanna Knyazyeva-Minenko	14.23w	3 Q	14.51w	2nd place, silver medalist(s)
Javelin Throw	Margaryta Dorozhon	NM		Did not advance	

Key

- Q = Qualified for the next round
- q = Qualified for the next round as a fastest loser or, in field events, by position without achieving the qualifying target
- N/A = Round not applicable for the event
- Bye = Athlete not required to compete in round
