= Germany at the 2026 European Athletics Championships =

- Flag of Germany
- WA code: GER
- National federation: German Athletics Association

in Birmingham, United Kingdom 10–16 August 2026
- Competitors: 116 (57 men and 59 women)
- Medals Ranked 3rd: Gold 6 Silver 10 Bronze 5 Total 21

European Athletics Championships appearances (overview)
- 1934; 1938; 1946–1950; 1954; 1958; 1962; 1966–1990; 1994; 1998; 2002; 2006; 2010; 2012; 2014; 2016; 2018; 2022; 2024; 2026

Germany competed at the 2026 European Athletics Championships in Birmingham, United Kingdom from 10–16 August 2026.

Germany finished third in the medal table with a total of 21 medals, including 6 gold, 10 silver, and 5 bronze, marking the nation's most successful performance at the European Athletics Championships since 1998. In the placing table, Germany also finished third with a total of 196 points, securing 37 top-eight finishes throughout the championships.

== Medallists ==
Medal	Name	Event	Date
Gold	Gesa Felicitas Krause	Women's 3000 metres steeplechase	13 August
Gold	Leo Neugebauer	Men's decathlon	13 August
Gold	Owen Ansah	Men's 200 metres	14 August
Gold	Julian Weber	Men's javelin throw	15 August
Gold	Amanal Petros	Men's marathon	16 August
Gold	Frederik Ruppert	Men's 3000 metres steeplechase	16 August
Silver	Florian Bremm	Men's 5000 metres	10 August
Silver	Merlin Hummel	Men's hammer throw	11 August
Silver	Niklas Kaul	Men's decathlon	13 August
Silver	Emil Agyekum	Men's 400 metres hurdles	14 August
Silver	Shanice Craft	Women's discus throw	14 August
Silver	Nick Thumm	Men's javelin throw	15 August
Silver	Kevin Kranz; Marvin Schulte; Heiko Gussmann; Lucas Ansah-Peprah	Men's 4 × 100 metres relay	15 August
Silver	Simon Boch; Samuel Fitwi Sabhatu; Erik Hille; Amanal Petros; Richard Ringer; Tom Thurley	Men's marathon team	16 August
Silver	Kevin Kranz; Rebekka Haase; Heiko Gussmann; Gina Lückenkemper	Mixed 4 × 100 metres relay	16 August
Silver	Julia Ulbricht	Women's javelin throw	16 August
Bronze	Yemisi Mabry	Women's shot put	10 August
Bronze	Owen Ansah	Men's 100 metres	11 August
Bronze	Olivia Gürth	Women's 3000 metres steeplechase	13 August
Bronze	Henrik Janssen	Men's discus throw	13 August
Bronze	Karl Bebendorf	Men's 3000 metres steeplechase	16 August

== Results ==
Germany entered the following athletes.

Key

- Q = Qualified for the next round
- q = Qualified for the next round as a fastest loser or, in field events, by position without achieving the qualifying target
- NR = National record
- PB = Personal best
- SB = Season best
- N/A = Round not applicable for the event

=== Men ===
Track and road events

Athlete	Event	Heat		Semifinal		Final	
Athlete	Event	Result	Rank	Result	Rank	Result	Rank
Owen Ansah	100 m	Bye		10.20	2 Q	10.19	3rd place, bronze medalist(s)
Lucas Ansah-Peprah	100 m	10.52	8 q	10.49	8	Did not advance	
Heiko Gussmann	100 m	Bye		10.37	3	Did not advance	
Owen Ansah	200 m	Bye		20.04 =EL PB	1 Q	19.95	1st place, gold medalist(s)
Joshua Hartmann	200 m	20.61	2 q	20.36	3	Did not advance	
Kameron Horton	200 m	Bye		20.60	6	Did not advance	
Jean Paul Bredau	400 m	Bye		44.86	1 Q	44.93	5
Thorben Finke	400 m	45.79	8 q	45.66	7	Did not advance	
Alexander Stepanov	800 m	1:46.27	3 Q	1:45.46	5	Did not advance	
Robert Farken	1500 m	3:41.65	2 Q	—N/a		3:37.49	9
Marc Tortell	1500 m	3:42.21	12	—N/a		Did not advance	
Florian Bremm	5000 m	—N/a				13:15.60	2nd place, silver medalist(s)
Simon Boch	Marathon	—N/a				2:12:55 SB	21
Samuel Fitwi	Marathon	—N/a				2:09:47	9
Erik Hille	Marathon	—N/a				2:16:22	28
Amanal Petros	Marathon	—N/a				2:09:11 CR	1st place, gold medalist(s)
Richard Ringer	Marathon	—N/a				2:10:05 SB	10
Tom Thurley	Marathon	—N/a				2:18:56	37
Simon Boch; Samuel Fitwi; Erik Hille; Amanal Petros; Richard Ringer; Tom Thurley	Marathon team	—N/a				6:29:03	2nd place, silver medalist(s)
Gregory Minoué	110 m hurdles	13.84	7 q	Withdrew			
Emil Agyekum	400 m hurdles	Bye		48.17	1 Q	47.87	2nd place, silver medalist(s)
Owe Fischer-Breiholz	400 m hurdles	Bye		48.23	2 Q	48.56	5
Karl Bebendorf	3000 m steeplechase	8:35.26	6 Q	—N/a		8:26.65	3rd place, bronze medalist(s)
Niklas Buchholz	3000 m steeplechase	8:35.90	5 Q	—N/a		8:31.08	9
Frederik Ruppert	3000 m steeplechase	8:35.46	3 Q	—N/a		8:25.33	1st place, gold medalist(s)
Leo Köpp	Half marathon walk	—N/a				DQ	
Frederick Weigel	Half marathon walk	—N/a				1:30:04	18
Johannes Frenzl	Marathon walk	—N/a				3:09:12 PB	15
Karl Junghannß	Marathon walk	—N/a				DNS	
Christopher Linke	Marathon walk	—N/a				3:02:08 PB	8
Kevin Kranz; Marvin Schulte; Heiko Gussmann; Lucas Ansah-Peprah	4 × 100 m relay	38.57	2 Q	—N/a		38.64	2nd place, silver medalist(s)
Thilo Traue; Jean Paul Bredau; Thorben Finke Florian Kroll; Manuel Sanders (heats)	4 × 400 m relay	3:01.07 SB	3 Q	—N/a		3:02.45	7

Field events

Athlete	Event	Qualification		Final	
Athlete	Event	Distance	Position	Distance	Position
Falk Wendrich	High jump	2.23 =SB	9 q	2.18	10
Gillian Ladwig	Pole vault	5.45	12 q	5.55	11
Bo Kanda Lita Baehre	Pole vault	5.60	1 q	5.70	9
Simon Batz	Long jump	DNS			
Kevin Brucha	Long jump	7.47	25	Did not advance	
Simon Plitzko	Long jump	7.60	21	Did not advance	
Georg Harpf	Shot put	19.45	13	Did not advance	
Eric Maihöfer	Shot put	19.90	7 q	NM	
Henrik Janssen	Discus throw	65.42	3 q	69.53 SB	3rd place, bronze medalist(s)
Marius Karges	Discus throw	60.73	15	Did not advance	
Steven Richter	Discus throw	62.02	13	Did not advance	
Merlin Hummel	Hammer throw	75.49	10 q	81.30	2nd place, silver medalist(s)
Sören Klose	Hammer throw	75.80	8 q	78.13	6
Thomas Röhler	Javelin throw	78.67	14	Did not advance	
Nick Thumm	Javelin throw	83.49 PB	2 Q	83.76 PB	2nd place, silver medalist(s)
Julian Weber	Javelin throw	84.02	1 Q	90.40 CR EL	1st place, gold medalist(s)

Combined events – Decathlon

Athlete	Event	100 m	LJ	SP	HJ	400 m	110H	DT	PV	JT	1500 m	Final	Rank
Amadeus Gräber	Result	10.79	7.23	13.29	1.99	48.31 PB	14.74	43.44	5.10	60.03	4:34.25 SB	8162	8
Amadeus Gräber	Points	908	869	685	794	894	881	735	941	738	717	8162	8
Niklas Kaul	Result	11.23 SB	7.22 SB	15.26 PB	2.02 SB	47.99 SB	14.73	48.88 SB	4.90 =SB	73.54	4:20.70 SB	8573 SB	2nd place, silver medalist(s)
Niklas Kaul	Points	810	866	806	822	910	882	847	880	943	807	8573 SB	2nd place, silver medalist(s)
Leo Neugebauer	Result	10.90	7.82	17.13 CDB SB	1.99	48.81	14.94	54.31 CDB SB	4.90	60.10 SB	4:38.36 SB	8611	1st place, gold medalist(s)
Leo Neugebauer	Points	883	1015	921	794	870	857	961	880	739	691	8611	1st place, gold medalist(s)

=== Women ===
Track and road events

Athlete	Event	Heat		Semifinal		Final	
Athlete	Event	Result	Rank	Result	Rank	Result	Rank
Rebekka Haase	100 m	Bye		11.36	7	Did not advance	
Chelsea Kadiri	100 m	11.47	18	Did not advance			
Gina Lückenkemper	100 m	Bye		11.28	5	Did not advance	
Sophia Junk	200 m	Bye		23.22	5	Did not advance	
Judith Mokobe	200 m	Bye		23.24	4	Did not advance	
Talea Prepens	200 m	23.16	5 q	23.32	6	Did not advance	
Johanna Martin	400 m	Bye		51.34	5	Did not advance	
Jana Marie Becker	800 m	1:59.08 PB	6	Did not advance			
Smilla Kolbe	800 m	1:57.80 PB	3 Q	1:58.21	5	Did not advance	
Majtie Kolberg	800 m	DNF		Did not advance			
Vanessa Mikitenko	5000 m	—N/a				15:54.49	14
Eva Dieterich	10,000 m	—N/a				33:32.88	22
Lisa Merkel	10,000 m	—N/a				32:09.07	9
Laura Hottenrott	Marathon	—N/a				2:31:15 SB	16
Fabienne Königstein	Marathon	—N/a				DNF	
Nina Reuter	Marathon	—N/a				2:42:34	41
Katharina Saathoff	Marathon	—N/a				2:39:34	32
Tabea Themann	Marathon	—N/a				2:35:18	23
Laura Hottenrott; Fabienne Königstein; Nina Reuter; Katharina Saathoff; Tabea Themann	Marathon team	—N/a				7:46:07	5
Lia Flotow	100 m hurdles	12.95	9 q	13.02	5	Did not advance	
Rosina Schneider	100 m hurdles	12.76 PB	1 q	12.96	3	Did not advance	
Franziska Schuster	100 m hurdles	Bye		DNF		Did not advance	
Vanessa Baldé	400 m hurdles	56.52	13	Did not advance			
Eileen Demes	400 m hurdles	Bye		54.63 SB	3	Did not advance	
Olivia Gürth	3000 m steeplechase	9:32.65	4 Q	—N/a		9:15.33 SB	3rd place, bronze medalist(s)
Gesa Felicitas Krause	3000 m steeplechase	9:32.27	2 Q	—N/a		9:12.69	1st place, gold medalist(s)
Lea Meyer	3000 m steeplechase	9:32.21	1 Q	—N/a		9:17.07	4
Bianca Maria Dittrich	Marathon walk	—N/a				DNF	
Ada Junghannß	Marathon walk	—N/a				3:40:37 PB	9
Jolina Ernst; Rebekka Haase; Sophia Junk; Gina Lückenkemper	4 × 100 m relay	DNF		—N/a		Did not advance	
Irina Gorr; Jana Lakner; Luna Bredau; Johanna Martin; Annkathrin Hoven (heats)	4 × 400 m relay	3:26.24	3 Q	—N/a		3:28.90	8

Field events

Athlete	Event	Qualification		Final	
Athlete	Event	Distance	Position	Distance	Position
Anna-Elisabeth Ehlers	High jump	1.84	22	Did not advance	
Dorothea Gantert	High jump	1.84	25	Did not advance	
Christina Honsel	High jump	1.91	1 Q	1.92	4
Anjuli Knäsche	Pole vault	4.40	13	Did not advance	
Mikaelle Assani	Long jump	6.52	18	Did not advance	
Imke Daalmann	Long jump	NM		Did not advance	
Malaika Mihambo	Long jump	7.10	1 Q	6.94	5
Ruth Hildebrand	Triple jump	13.90	17	Did not advance	
Caroline Joyeux	Triple jump	13.98	14	Did not advance	
Kira Wittmann	Triple jump	14.26 PB	4 Q	14.32	6
Yemisi Mabry	Shot put	19.25	1 Q	19.50	3rd place, bronze medalist(s)
Katharina Maisch	Shot put	17.64	11 q	18.39	7
Nina Ndubuisi	Shot put	17.71	9 q	18.21	8
Shanice Craft	Discus throw	63.46	2 Q	65.72	2nd place, silver medalist(s)
Kristin Pudenz	Discus throw	60.48	8 q	63.27	5
Marike Steinacker	Discus throw	54.05	22	Did not advance	
Samantha Borutta	Hammer throw	67.62	13	Did not advance	
Jada Julien	Hammer throw	64.66	22	Did not advance	
Aileen Kuhn	Hammer throw	70.14	7 q	68.24	10
Luisa Tremel	Javelin throw	58.32	7 q	53.19	12
Julia Ulbricht	Javelin throw	60.86	2 q	61.53	2nd place, silver medalist(s)

Combined events – Heptathlon

Athlete	Event	100H	HJ	SP	200 m	LJ	JT	800 m	Final	Rank
Vanessa Grimm	Result	13.47	1.71	14.94	24.63	5.84	43.87 SB	2:16.17	6119	14
Vanessa Grimm	Points	1055	867	857	921	801	742	876	6119	14
Sandrina Sprengel	Result	14.03	1.71	14.30	24.34	6.20	40.84	2:17.41	6057	15
Sandrina Sprengel	Points	974	867	814	948	912	683	859	6057	15
Sophie Weißenberg	Result	13.19 PB	1.80 SB	14.04 SB	23.39	6.56	44.34	2:21.22	6496 PB	5
Sophie Weißenberg	Points	1096	978	797	1040	1027	751	807	6496 PB	5

=== Mixed ===
Track and road events

Athlete	Event	Final	
Athlete	Event	Result	Rank
Kevin Kranz; Rebekka Haase; Heiko Gussmann; Gina Lückenkemper	Mixed 4 × 100 m	40.11 NR	2nd place, silver medalist(s)
