= 2024 European Athletics Championships – Men's half marathon =

Men's half marathon at the 2024 European Athletics Championships
- Venue: Stadio Olimpico
- Location: Rome
- Dates: 9 June (final)
- Competitors: 66 from 24 nations
- Winning time: 1:01.03

Medalists
gold medal	Yemaneberhan Crippa	Italy
silver medal	Pietro Riva	Italy
bronze medal	Amanal Petros	Germany

Men's Team at the 2024 European Half Marathon Cup
- Venue: Stadio Olimpico
- Location: Rome
- Dates: 9 June (final)
- Nations: 12
- Winning time: 3:03.34

Medalists
gold medal	Yemaneberhan Crippa; Pietro Riva; Pasquale Selvarolo; Eyob Faniel; Yohanes Chiappinelli; Daniele Meucci	Italy
silver medal	Maru Teferi; Gashau Ayale; Girmaw Amare; Haimro Alame; Godadaw Belachew; Tesema Moges	Israel
bronze medal	Amanal Petros; Samuel Fitwi Sibhatu; Filimon Abraham; Richard Ringer; Simon Boch; Hendrik Pfeiffer	Germany

The men's half marathon at the 2024 European Athletics Championships took place at the Stadio Olimpico on 9 June.

== Records ==
Standing records prior to the 2024 European Athletics Championships
World record	Jacob Kiplimo (UGA)	57:31	Lisbon, Portugal	21 November 2021
European record	Julien Wanders (SUI)	59:13	Ras Al Khaimah, United Arab Emirates	8 February 2019
Championship record	Tadesse Abraham (SUI)	1:02:03	Amsterdam, Netherlands	10 July 2016
World Leading	Sabastian Sawe (KEN)	58:24	Prague, Czech Republic	6 April 2024
Europe Leading	Andreas Almgren (SWE)	59:23	Barcelona, Spain	11 February 2024

== Schedule ==
Date	Time	Round
9 June 2024	09:00	Final

All times are local times (UTC+2)

== Results ==
The start was at 09:00. 57 runners completed the competition.

Rank	Name	Nationality	Time	Note
1st place, gold medalist(s)	Yemaneberhan Crippa	Italy	1:01:03	CR
2nd place, silver medalist(s)	Pietro Riva	Italy	1:01:04	SB
3rd place, bronze medalist(s)	Amanal Petros	Germany	1:01:07	
4	Maru Teferi	Israel	1:01:10	SB
5	Samuel Fitwi Sibhatu	Germany	1:01:17	PB
6	Pasquale Selvarolo	Italy	1:01:27	SB
7	Gashau Ayale	Israel	1:01:28	PB
8	Eyob Faniel	Italy	1:01:29	SB
9	Girmaw Amare	Israel	1:01:31	PB
10	Yohanes Chiappinelli	Italy	1:01:42	SB
11	Jorge González Rivera	Spain	1:01:55	PB
12	Sondre Nordstad Moen	Norway	1:02:03	
13	Suldan Hassan	Sweden	1:02:09	SB
14	Carlos Mayo	Spain	1:02:12	SB
15	Simon Debognies	Belgium	1:02:15	
16	Felix Bour	France	1:02:23	SB
17	Yago Rojo	Spain	1:02:37	SB
18	Haimro Alame	Israel	1:02:38	=PB
19	Filmon Tesfu	Netherlands	1:02:42	SB
20	Godadaw Belachew	Israel	1:02:53	SB
21	Matthias Kyburz	Switzerland	1:03:07	
22	Filimon Abraham	Germany	1:03:09	SB
23	Dorian Boulvin	Belgium	1:03:15	
24	Javier Guerra	Spain	1:03:17	SB
25	Michael Somers	Belgium	1:03:20	SB
26	Zerei Kbrom Mezngi	Norway	1:03:32	
27	Daniele Meucci	Italy	1:03:45	SB
28	Richard Ringer	Germany	1:03:53	SB
29	Dario Ivanovski	North Macedonia	1:04:01	NR
30	Jorge Blanco	Spain	1:04:09	SB
31	Simon Boch	Germany	1:04:16	
32	Timo Hinterndorfer	Austria	1:04:27	
33	Emmanuel Roudolff	France	1:04:30	
34	Hendrik Pfeiffer	Germany	1:04:32	
35	Ilham Tanui Özbilen	Turkey	1:04:42	SB
36	Tadesse Abraham	Switzerland	1:04:53	
37	Benjamin Choquert	France	1:04:55	
38	Rui Pinto	Portugal	1:04:55	
39	Ibrahim Chakir	Spain	1:05:00	SB
40	Tiidrek Nurme	Estonia	1:05:00	SB
41	Miguel Borges	Portugal	1:05:16	
42	Andreas Vojta	Austria	1:05:38	
43	Hiko Tonosa Haso	Ireland	1:05:42	
44	Weldu Negash Gebretsadik	Norway	1:05:54	SB
45	Levente Szemerei	Hungary	1:05:57	SB
46	Nicolas Navarro	France	1:06:02	SB
47	Patrik Wägeli	Switzerland	1:06:03	SB
48	Tesema Moges	Israel	1:06:06	SB
49	Peter Herzog	Austria	1:06:07	SB
50	Jacob Sommer Simonsen	Denmark	1:06:27	
51	Leonid Latsepov	Estonia	1:07:09	
52	Primož Kobe	Slovenia	1:07:30	
53	Olavi Allase	Estonia	1:07:48	
54	Mario Bauernfeind	Austria	1:08:03	
55	Nicolae Alexandru Soare	Romania	1:08:31	
56	Panagiotis Karaiskos	Greece	1:08:52	
57	Dominik Stadlmann	Austria	1:09:03	
	Amine Khadiri	Cyprus	DNS	
	Daviti Kharazishvili	Georgia	DNS	
	Awet Nftalem Kibrab	Norway	DNF	
	Mateusz Kaczor	Poland	DNF	
	Samuel Barata	Portugal	DNF	
	Hélio Gomes	Portugal	DNF	
	Julien Wanders	Switzerland	DNF	
	Polat Kemboi Arıkan	Turkey	DNF	
	Sezgin Ataç	Turkey	DNF	
