= 2026 European Athletics Championships – Men's marathon team =

Men's marathon team at the 2026 European Athletics Championships
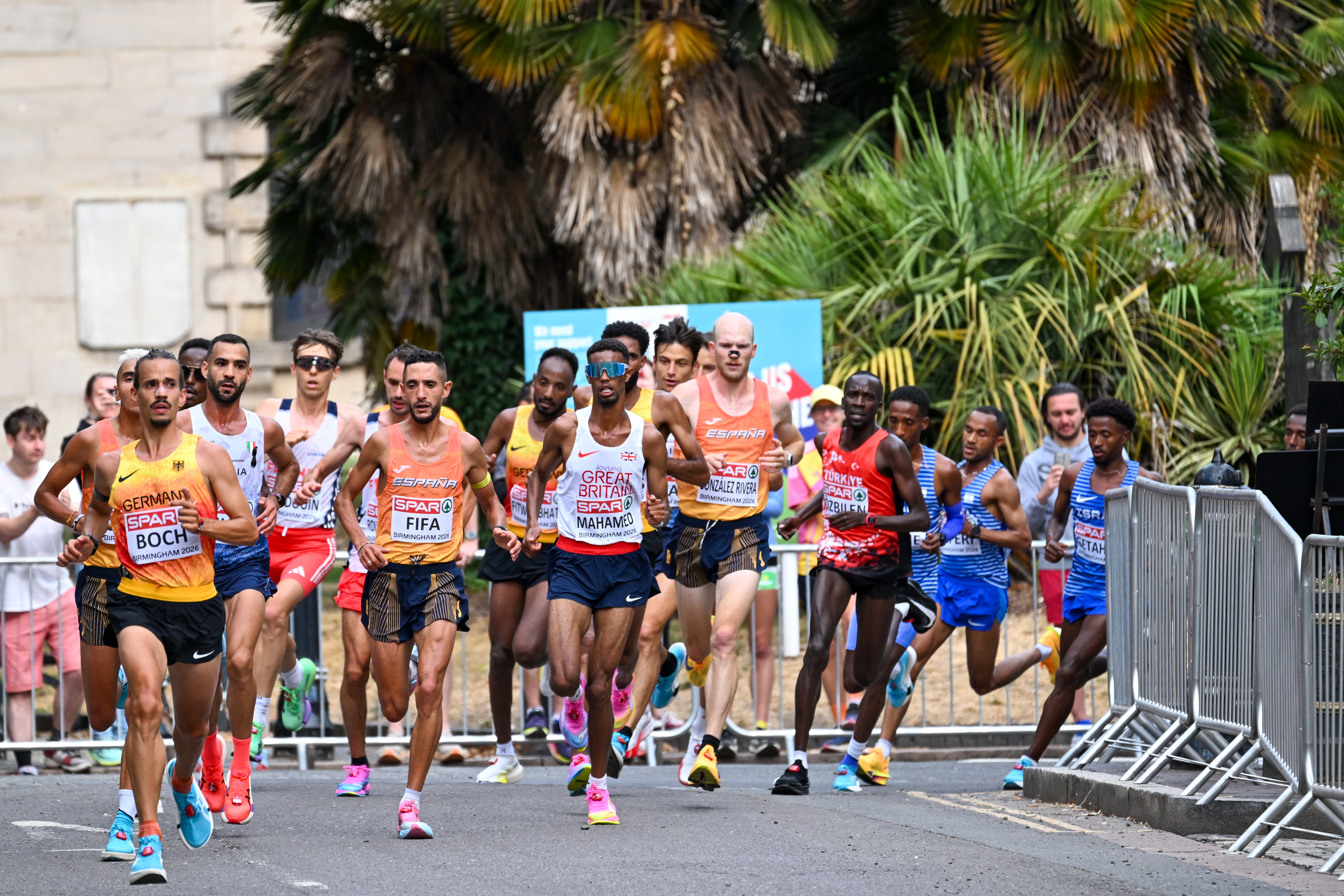
- An initial phase of the men's marathon
- Venue: Birmingham city
- Location: Birmingham, United Kingdom
- Dates: 16 August 2026
- Competitors: 60 (target)
- Teams: 10
- Winning time: 6:28:37

Medalists
gold medal	Gashau Ayale (3); Tadesse Getahon (5); Haimro Alame (8); Yitayew Abuhay (12); Maru Teferi (22); Bukayawe Malede (35)	Israel
silver medal	Amanal Petros (1); Samuel Fitwi Sibhatu (9); Richard Ringer (10); Simon Boch (21); Erik Hille (28); Tom Thurley (37)	Germany
bronze medal	Valentin Gondouin (6); Emmanuel Roudolff Levisse (11); Hassan Chahdi (19); Felix Bour (DNF)	France

The men's marathon team at the 2026 European Athletics Championships took place in Birmingham, United Kingdom, on 16 August 2026. The event, held within the men's marathon at the 2026 European Athletics Championships, doubled as the men's race for the European Marathon Cup.

== Rules ==
The ranking was compiled by adding together the times of the first three athletes from each nation to reach the finish line, however medals were awarded to all team members. Ten nations entered at least the minimum three athletes required to achieve a ranking in the team event.

== Results ==
Place	Team	Time
1st place, gold medalist(s)	Israel; Gashau Ayale (3); Tadesse Getahon (5); Haimro Alame (8); Yitayew Abuhay (12); Maru Teferi (22); Bukayawe Malede (35)	6:28:37
2nd place, silver medalist(s)	Germany; Amanal Petros (1); Samuel Fitwi Sibhatu (9); Richard Ringer (10); Simon Boch (21); Erik Hille (28); Tom Thurley (37)	6:29:03
3rd place, bronze medalist(s)	France; Valentin Gondouin (6); Emmanuel Roudolff Levisse (11); Hassan Chahdi (19); Felix Bour (DNF)	6:32:12
4	Spain; Jorge González Rivera (14); Carlos Mayo (15); Ilias Fifa (16); Ibrahim Chakir (20); Jorge Blanco (24); Fernando Carro (44)	6:34:10
5	Italy; Pietro Riva (2); Ahmed Ouhda (18); Daniele Meucci (23); Xavier Chevrier (32); Badr Jaafari (DNF)	6:35:36
6	Sweden; Suldan Hassan (4); Ebba Tulu Chala (13); Archie Casteel (47); Samuel Tsegay Tesfamariam (DNF)	6:44:04
7	Belgium; Vincent Bierinckx (25); Nathan Sevenois (29); Yohan Zaradzki (38)	6:51:04
8	United Kingdom; Mahamed Mahamed (7); Tewelde Menges (40); Jonathan Mellor (50); Weynay Ghebresilasie (DNF)	6:57:24
9	Hungary; Ádám Lomb (27); Levente Szemerei (33); László Tarnai (51)	7:04:54
10	Norway; Sjur Prestsæter (30); Eivind Øygard (42); Erik Lomås (52)	7:11:15
