= Israel at the 2014 European Athletics Championships =

Israel's 2014 participation in European athletics competition

- WA code: ISR
- National federation: Israeli Athletic Association
- Website: www.sul.fi

in Zürich
- Competitors: 10
- Medals: Gold 0 Silver 0 Bronze 1 Total 1

European Athletics Championships appearances
- 1990; 1994; 1998; 2002; 2006; 2010; 2012; 2014; 2016; 2018; 2022; 2024

Israel competed at the 2014 European Athletics Championships in Zürich, Switzerland, between 12 and 17 August 2014. A delegation of ten athletes were sent to represent the country.

== Men's events ==
=== Track ===
Event	Athletes	Heats		Semifinal		Final	
Event	Athletes	Result	Rank	Result	Rank	Result	Rank
400 m	Donald Sanford	46.18 Q	19	45.39 q, NR	3	45.27 NR	3rd place, bronze medalist(s)
3000 m steeplechase	Noam Nee'man	8:45.33	22	—		Did not advance	
10000 m	Aimeru Alemya	—				30:04.95	17
10000 m	Girmaw Amare	—				30:53.87	18
Marathon	Ymaren Joseph	—				2:24:26	40
Marathon	Vova Brihon	—				2:24:39	41
Marathon	Amir Ramon	—				2:30:45	50
Marathon	Zohar Zimro	—				Did not finish	

== Women's events ==
=== Field ===
Event	Athletes	Qualification		Final	
Event	Athletes	Result	Rank	Result	Rank
High jump	Maayan Shahaf	1.85 q	11	1.85	14
Triple jump	Hanna Minenko	Did not start		Did not advance	
