= Adam Craig =

Adam Craig may refer to:

- Adam Craig (cyclist) (born 1981), American mountain biker
- Adam Craig (singer), American country music singer-songwriter
- Adam Craig (runner) (born 1995), British long-distance runner
- Adam Jamal Craig (born 1978), American actor
