= 2022 European Athletics Championships – Men's marathon =

Men's marathon at the 2022 European Athletics Championships
- Location: Munich
- Date: 15 August 2022
- Competitors: 79 from 27 nations
- Winning result: 2:10:21

Medalists
| gold medal | Richard Ringer | Germany |
| silver medal | Maru Teferi | Israel |
| bronze medal | Gashau Ayale | Israel |

The men's marathon at the 2022 European Athletics Championships took place at the streets of Munich on 15 August.

== Records ==
Standing records prior to the 2022 European Athletics Championships
| World record | Eliud Kipchoge (KEN) | 2:01:39 | Berlin, Germany | 16 September 2018 |
| European record | Bashir Abdi (BEL) | 2:03:36 | Rotterdam, Netherlands | 24 October 2021 |
| Championship record | Koen Naert (BEL) | 2:09:51 | Berlin, Germany | 12 August 2018 |
| World Leading | Eliud Kipchoge (KEN) | 2:02:40 | Tokyo, Japan | 6 March 2022 |
| Europe Leading | Abdi Nageeye (NED) | 2:04:56 | Rotterdam, Netherlands | 10 April 2022 |

== Schedule ==
| Date | Time | Round |
|---|---|---|
| 15 August 2022 | 11:30 | Final |

All times are local times (UTC+2)

== Results ==
The race started at 11:30 CEST.

| Rank | Name | Nationality | Time | Note |
|---|---|---|---|---|
| 1st place, gold medalist(s) | Richard Ringer | Germany | 2:10:21 | SB |
| 2nd place, silver medalist(s) | Marhu Teferi | Israel | 2:10:23 | |
| 3rd place, bronze medalist(s) | Gashau Ayale | Israel | 2:10:29 | SB |
| 4 | Amanal Petros | Germany | 2:10:39 | SB |
| 5 | Nicolas Navarro | France | 2:10:41 | |
| 6 | Ayad Lamdassem | Spain | 2:10:52 | |
| 7 | Yimer Getahun | Israel | 2:10:56 | SB |
| 8 | Koen Naert | Belgium | 2:11:28 | SB |
| 9 | Girmaw Amare | Israel | 2:11:32 | |
| 10 | Michael Gras | France | 2:12:39 | |
| 11 | Tiidrek Nurme | Estonia | 2:12:46 | |
| 12 | Jorge Blanco | Spain | 2:13:18 | SB |
| 13 | Daniele Meucci | Italy | 2:14:22 | |
| 14 | Daniel Mateo | Spain | 2:14:34 | |
| 15 | Yago Rojo | Spain | 2:14:41 | SB |
| 16 | Johannes Motschmann | Germany | 2:14:52 | SB |
| 17 | Philip Sesemann | Great Britain | 2:15:17 | SB |
| 18 | Adam Nowicki | Poland | 2:15:21 | SB |
| 19 | Iliass Aouani | Italy | 2:15:34 | |
| 20 | Rui Pinto | Portugal | 2:15:43 | |
| 21 | Benjamin Choquert | France | 2:15:48 | |
| 22 | René Cunéaz | Italy | 2:15:55 | |
| 23 | Adrian Lehmann | Switzerland | 2:15:57 | SB |
| 24 | Hendrik Pfeiffer | Germany | 2:16:04 | |
| 25 | Konstantin Wedel | Germany | 2:16:09 | |
| 26 | Omer Ramon | Israel | 2:16:35 | |
| 27 | Abdi Hakin Ulad | Denmark | 2:16:41 | |
| 28 | Jonas Leandersson | Sweden | 2:16:54 | |
| 29 | Linus Rosdal | Sweden | 2:17:09 | SB |
| 30 | Mohamud Aadan | Great Britain | 2:17:34 | |
| 31 | Archie Casteel | Sweden | 2:17:44 | |
| 32 | Kaur Kivistik | Estonia | 2:17:51 | |
| 33 | Stefano La Rosa | Italy | 2:17:57 | |
| 34 | Fábio Oliveira | Portugal | 2:18:02 | |
| 35 | Andrew Davies | Great Britain | 2:18:23 | |
| 36 | Gáspár Csere | Hungary | 2:18:35 | SB |
| 37 | Patrik Wägeli | Switzerland | 2:18:46 | SB |
| 38 | Ilie Corneschi | Romania | 2:18:59 | |
| 39 | Weldu Negash Gebretsadik | Norway | 2:18:59 | |
| 40 | Tom Hendrikse | Netherlands | 2:19:21 | SB |
| 41 | Roman Fosti | Estonia | 2:19:34 | SB |
| 42 | Ronald Schröer | Netherlands | 2:19:40 | |
| 43 | Abdelaziz Merzougui | Spain | 2:19:47 | SB |
| 44 | Andrew Heyes | Great Britain | 2:19:47 | |
| 45 | Mustafa Mohamed | Sweden | 2:19:52 | SB |
| 46 | Andreas Lommer | Denmark | 2:20:34 | |
| 47 | Maxim Răileanu | Moldova | 2:21:01 | |
| 48 | Luís Saraiva | Portugal | 2:21:23 | |
| 49 | Arkadiusz Gardzielewski | Poland | 2:21:34 | |
| 50 | Simon Boch | Germany | 2:21:39 | SB |
| 51 | Kamil Karbowiak | Poland | 2:21:48 | SB |
| 52 | Florian Carvalho | France | 2:21:51 | |
| 53 | Vitaliy Shafar | Ukraine | 2:22:24 | |
| 54 | Ebba Tulu Chala | Sweden | 2:23:04 | |
| 55 | Hermano Ferreira | Portugal | 2:24:21 | |
| 56 | Ivan Siuris | Moldova | 2:25:17 | |
| 57 | Ignas Brasevičius | Lithuania | 2:25:25 | |
| 58 | Hugh Armstrong | Ireland | 2:25:27 | |
| 59 | Ihor Heletiy | Ukraine | 2:26:33 | SB |
| 60 | Martin Olesen | Denmark | 2:28:04 | |
| 61 | Primož Kobe | Slovenia | 2:29:23 | |
| 62 | Rune Bækgaard | Denmark | 2:31:37 | |
| | Julien Lyon | Switzerland | Did not finish | |
| | Ömer Alkanoğlu | Turkey | Did not finish | |
| | Soufiane Bouchikhi | Belgium | Did not finish | |
| | Jiří Homoláč | Czech Republic | Did not finish | |
| | Bukayawe Malede | Israel | Did not finish | |
| | Emmanuel Roudolff | France | Did not finish | |
| | Polat Kemboi Arıkan | Turkey | Did not finish | |
| | Luke Caldwell | Great Britain | Did not finish | |
| | Daniele D'Onofrio | Italy | Did not finish | |
| | Tachlowini Gabriyesos | ART | Did not finish | |
| | Arttu Vattulainen | Finland | Did not finish | |
| | Dario Ivanovski | North Macedonia | Did not finish | |
| | Remigijus Kančys | Lithuania | Did not finish | |
| | Nicolaï Saké | Belgium | Did not finish | |
| | Kamil Jastrzębski | Poland | Did not finish | |
| | Yohan Durand | France | Did not finish | |
| | Tsegay Tesfamariam | Sweden | Did not finish | |
