= 2019 European 10,000m Cup =

- Organisers: EAA
- Edition: 23nd
- Date: 6 July
- Host city: London, Great Britain (United Kingdom)
- Venue: Parliament Hill Athletics Track
- Events: 2
- Official website: Official website

The 2019 European 10,000m Cup took place on 6 July 2019. The races took place on Parliament Hill Athletics Track in London, Great Britain. The event was held together with the annual Night of the 10,000m PB's meeting for the second successive year.

== Medallists ==
| Event | Gold | Silver | Bronze |
|---|---|---|---|
Individual
| Men | (Italy) Yemaneberhan Crippa; 27 min 49 s 79 (PB) | (Germany) Amanal Petros; 27 min 52 s 25 (PB) | (United Kingdom) Ben Connor; 27 min 57 s 60 (PB) |
| Women | (United Kingdom) Stephanie Twell; 31 min 08 s 13 (PB) | (Israel) Lonah Chemtai Salpeter; 31 min 15 s 78 (NR, PB) | (United Kingdom) Eilish McColgan; 31 min 16 s 76 (PB) |
Team
| Men | Italy; 1 h 24 min 25 s 02 | Great Britain; 1 h 24 min 55 s 33 | Germany; 1 h 25 min 12 s 89 |
| Women | Great Britain; 1 h 36 min 18 s 80 | Spain; 1 h 38 min 07 s 75 | Italy; 1 h 38 min 13 s 80 |

== Race results ==
=== Men's ===
Individual race
| Rank | Heat | Athlete | Nationality | Time | Note |
|---|---|---|---|---|---|
| 1st place, gold medalist(s) | A | Yemaneberhan Crippa | Italy | 27:49.79 | SB |
| 2nd place, silver medalist(s) | A | Amanal Petros | Germany | 27:52.25 | PB |
| 3rd place, bronze medalist(s) | A | Ben Connor | Great Britain | 27:57.60 | PB |
| 4 | A | Soufiane Bouchikhi | Belgium | 28:04.09 | SB |
| 5 | A | Sondre Nordstad Moen | Norway | 28:06.27 | PB |
| 6 | A | Lorenzo Dini | Italy | 28:09.21 | PB |
| 7 | A | Juan Antonio Pérez | Spain | 28:10.16 | PB |
| 8 | A | Nick Goolab | Great Britain | 28:10.49 | PB |
| 9 | A | Aras Kaya | Turkey | 28:21.24 | SB |
| 10 | A | Said El Otmani | Italy | 28:26.02 | PB |
| 11 | A | Sebastian Hendel | Germany | 28:27.11 | PB |
| 12 | A | Bohdan-Ivan Horodyskyy | Ukraine | 28:27.44 | PB |
| 13 | A | David Palacio | Spain | 28:28.05 | PB |
| 14 | A | Chris Thompson* | Great Britain | 28:28.55 | SB |
| 15 | A | Mohamud Aadan* | Great Britain | 28:28.68 | PB |
| 16 | A | Mohamed Jelloul | Spain | 28:37.91 | |
| 17 | A | Daniele Meucci | Italy | 28:38.35 | SB |
| 18 | A | Nicolae-Alexandru Soare | Romania | 28:39.95 | SB |
| 19 | A | Antonio Abadía | Spain | 28:42.12 | |
| 20 | A | Yago Rojo | Spain | 28:42.77 | |
| 21 | B | Yitayew Abuhay | Israel | 28:44.74 | PB |
| 22 | B | Italo Quazzola | Italy | 28:44.97 | PB |
| 23 | A | Matthew Leach | Great Britain | 28:47.24 | |
| 24 | A | Michael Somers | Belgium | 28:48.29 | PB |
| 25 | A | Jack Gray | Great Britain | 28:49.53 | PB |
| 26 | B | Gashau Ayale | Israel | 28:50.47 | PB |
| 27 | B | Sezgin Ataç | Turkey | 28:52.54 | PB |
| 28 | A | Simon Boch | Germany | 28:53.53 | |
| 29 | B | Philipp Pflieger | Germany | 28:54.77 | SB |
| 30 | B | Samuel Fitwi | Germany | 28:55.24 | SB |
| 31 | A | Haimro Alame | Israel | 28:56.58 | |
| 32 | B | Robel Fsiha | Sweden | 28:59.62 | PB |
| 33 | B | Ryan Forsyth | Ireland | 29:01.27 | PB |
| 34 | A | Mykola Nyzhnyk | Ukraine | 29:02.45 | |
| 35 | B | Thijs Nijhuis | Denmark | 29:03.60 | PB |
| 36 | A | Benjamin de Haan | Netherlands | 29:03.84 | |
| 37 | B | Dmytro Siruk | Ukraine | 29:03.90 | PB |
| 38 | B | Roman Romanenko | Ukraine | 29:04.10 | |
| 39 | A | Kieran Clements* | Great Britain | 29:08.66 | SB |
| 40 | A | Félix Bour | France | 29:09.05 | SB |
| 41 | A | Kristian Jones* | Great Britain | 29:10.27 | SB |
| 42 | A | Adam Hickey | Great Britain | 29:13.54 | |
| 43 | A | Krystian Zalewski | Poland | 29:14.67 | |
| 44 | A | Nassim Hassaous | Spain | 29:19.75 | |
| 45 | A | Andreas Vojta | Austria | 29:21.22 | SB |
| 46 | A | Graham Rush* | Great Britain | 29:22.57 | SB |
| 47 | B | Mathieu Brulet | France | 29:25.88 | |
| 48 | A | Andrew Heyes | Great Britain | 29:32.90 | PB |
| 49 | B | Daniel Gregório | Portugal | 29:33.73 | PB |
| 50 | A | Adam Craig* | Great Britain | 29:35.00 | PB |
| 51 | B | Eric Rüttimann | Switzerland | 29:34.95 | PB |
| 52 | B | Alexander Teuten* | Great Britain | 29:36.64 | PB |
| 53 | B | Tiidrek Nurme | Estonia | 29:36.64 | SB |
| 54 | B | Petter Rypdal | Norway | 29:36.88 | PB |
| 55 | B | Sullivan Brunet | Switzerland | 29:41.66 | SB |
| 56 | B | Valentin Poncelet | Belgium | 29:47.09 | PB |
| 57 | B | Marco Najibe Salami | Italy | 29:50.15 | SB |
| 58 | B | Stephan Listabarth | Austria | 29:50.82 | SB |
| 59 | B | Dmitrijs Serjogins | Latvia | 29:56.95 | PB |
| 60 | B | Arsène Guillorel | France | 30:10.12 | SB |
| 61 | B | Valdas Dopolskas | Lithuania | 30:15.57 | PB |
| 62 | B | Hannu Granberg | Finland | 30:27.44 | PB |
| 63 | B | David Nilsson | Sweden | 30:40.84 | SB |
| 64 | B | Ossi Kekki | Finland | 30:42.50 | SB |
| 65 | B | Patrik Wägeli | Switzerland | 30:46.02 | SB |
| 66 | B | Aki Nummela | Finland | 31:18.98 | SB |
| | A | Dawit Wolde | Ethiopia | DNF | Pace |
| | A | Dominic Kiptarus | Kenya | DNF | Pace |
| | A | Napoleon Solomon | Sweden | DNF | |
| | A | Ellis Cross* | Great Britain | DNF | |
| | A | Lucian Allison* | Great Britain | DNF | |
| | B | Jonny Davies* | Great Britain | DNF | |
| | B | Matt Baxter* | New Zealand | DNF | |
| | B | António Rocha | Portugal | DNF | |
| | B | Tomasz Grycko | Poland | DNF | |
| | B | Matt Bergin | Ireland | DNF | |

Teams
| Rank | Team | Time | Note |
|---|---|---|---|
| 1st place, gold medalist(s) | Italy | 1:24:25.02 | |
| 2nd place, silver medalist(s) | Great Britain | 1:24:55.33 | |
| 3rd place, bronze medalist(s) | Germany | 1:25:12.89 | |
| 4 | Spain | 1:25:16.12 | |
| 5 | Israel | 1:26:31.79 | |
| 6 | Ukraine | 1:26:33.79 | |
| 7 | Belgium | 1:26:39.47 | |
| 8 | France | 1:28:45.05 | |
| 9 | Switzerland | 1:30:02.63 | |
| 10 | Finland | 1:32:28.92 | |

=== Women's ===
Individual race
| Rank | Heat | Athlete | Nationality | Time | Note |
|---|---|---|---|---|---|
| 1st place, gold medalist(s) | A | Steph Twell* | Great Britain | 31:08.13 | PB |
| 2nd place, silver medalist(s) | A | Lonah Chemtai Salpeter | Israel | 31:15.78 | NR |
| 3rd place, bronze medalist(s) | A | Eilish McColgan | Great Britain | 31:16.76 | PB |
| 4 | A | Liv Westphal | France | 32:02.38 | PB |
| 5 | A | Fionnuala McCormack | Ireland | 32:05.29 | SB |
| 6 | A | Carmela Cardama | Spain | 32:26.43 | PB |
| 7 | A | Maitane Melero | Spain | 32:27.00 | PB |
| 8 | A | Darya Mykhaylova | Ukraine | 32:27.41 | PB |
| 9 | A | Alice Wright | Great Britain | 32:27.57 | |
| 10 | A | Sara Dossena | Italy | 32:30.47 | PB |
| 11 | A | Carla Salomé Rocha | Portugal | 32:33.43 | |
| 12 | A | Verity Ockenden | Great Britain | 32:34.47 | PB |
| 13 | A | Charlotta Fougberg | Sweden | 32:40.09 | |
| 14 | A | Charlotte Arter | Great Britain | 32:40.63 | SB |
| 15 | A | Isabel Mattuzzi | Italy | 32:44.17 | |
| 16 | A | Paulina Kaczyńska | Poland | 32:50.16 | PB |
| 17 | B | Nina Lauwaert | Belgium | 32:52.29 | PB |
| 18 | B | Sarah Inglis | Great Britain | 32:52.51 | |
| 19 | B | Nina Savina | Belarus | 32:52.66 | PB |
| 20 | A | Renata Pliś | Poland | 32:54.13 | PB |
| 21 | B | Sevilay Eytemiş | Turkey | 32:54.66 | PB |
| 22 | A | Roxana Bârcă | Romania | 32:55.10 | SB |
| 23 | B | Moira Stewartová | Czech Republic | 32:57.51 | PB |
| 24 | A | Mhairi Maclennan* | Great Britain | 32:58.42 | PB |
| 25 | B | Giovanna Epis | Italy | 32:59.16 | PB |
| 26 | A | Sviatlana Kudzelich | Belarus | 33:01.48 | SB |
| 27 | A | Olha Kotovska | Ukraine | 33:01.96 | PB |
| 28 | A | Valeriya Zinenko | Ukraine | 33:05.24 | |
| 29 | A | Stephanie Davis* | Great Britain | 33:07.53 | PB |
| 30 | A | Claire Duck* | Great Britain | 33:09.83 | SB |
| 31 | A | Nuria Lugueros | Spain | 33:14.32 | |
| 32 | B | Iryna Somava | Belarus | 33:22.19 | PB |
| 33 | B | Marta Galimany | Spain | 33:34.73 | PB |
| 34 | A | AnnMarie McGlynn | Ireland | 33:38.50 | SB |
| 35 | A | Sara Catarina Ribeiro | Portugal | 33:39.89 | SB |
| 36 | B | Susana Godinho | Portugal | 33:40.91 | |
| 37 | B | Cristina Simion | Romania | 33:41.02 | SB |
| 38 | B | Aoibhe Richardson | Ireland | 33:41.15 | PB |
| 39 | B | Katsiaryna Karneyenka | Belarus | 33:42.47 | PB |
| 40 | B | Esther Navarrete | Spain | 33:42.70 | |
| 41 | B | Nicole Egger | Switzerland | 33:44.57 | PB |
| 42 | A | Jip Vastenburg | Netherlands | 33:45.55 | SB |
| 43 | B | Maria Chiara Cascavilla | Italy | 33:47.00 | PB |
| 44 | B | Maria Sagnes Wågan | Norway | 33:48.00 | PB |
| 45 | A | Militsa Mircheva | Bulgaria | 33:48.42 | |
| 46 | A | Tatsiana Stsefanenka | Belarus | 33:52.79 | SB |
| 47 | A | Nicole Taylor* | Great Britain | 33:57.04 | |
| 48 | B | Valeria Roffino | Italy | 33:57.85 | PB |
| 49 | B | Kristina Hendel | Croatia | 34:02.04 | |
| 50 | B | Monika Bytautienė | Lithuania | 34:02.44 | PB |
| 51 | B | Teresa Urbina | Spain | 34:03.31 | |
| 52 | A | Louise Small* | Great Britain | 34:06.16 | SB |
| 53 | A | Emma Mitchell | Ireland | 34:12.24 | SB |
| 54 | B | Fionnuala Ross | Ireland | 34:25.78 | |
| 55 | A | Anna Gosk | Poland | 34:48.59 | |
| 56 | B | Fanni Gyurkó | Hungary | 35:37.39 | PB |
| 57 | B | Karen Van Proeyen | Belgium | 35:39.24 | |
| 58 | B | Rebecca Lonedo | Italy | 35:50.45 | |
| 59 | B | Fadouwa Ledhem | France | 36:35.53 | |
| | A | Jessica Augusto | Portugal | DNF | |
| | A | Hayley Carruthers* | Great Britain | DNF | |
| | A | Sophie Duarte | France | DNF | |
| | A | Ana Dulce Félix | Portugal | DNF | |
| | A | Sara Moreira | Portugal | DNF | |
| | A | Gema Martin | Spain | DNF | |
| | A | Alyson Dixon* | Great Britain | DNF | |
| | A | Roselida Jepketer | Kenya | DNF | Pace |
| | A | Eva Cherono | Kenya | DNF | Pace |
| | B | Elinor Kirk* | Great Britain | DNF | |
| | B | Emily Hosker-Thornhill* | Great Britain | DNF | |
| | B | Pernilla Epland | Norway | DNF | |

Teams
| Rank | Team | Time | Note |
|---|---|---|---|
| 1st place, gold medalist(s) | Great Britain | 1:36:18.80 | |
| 2nd place, silver medalist(s) | Spain | 1:38:07.75 | |
| 3rd place, bronze medalist(s) | Italy | 1:38:13.80 | |
| 4 | Ukraine | 1:38:34.61 | |
| 5 | Belarus | 1:39:16.33 | |
| 6 | Ireland | 1:39:24.94 | |
| 7 | Portugal | 1:39:54.23 | |
| 8 | Poland | 1:40:32.88 | |

* Athletes who competed in the Night of the 10,000m PBs but were not entered for the European Cup. The results of these athletes were not counted towards the final team score.
