= Ageze Guadie =

Israeli long-distance runner

Personal information
- Native name: גואדה אגזה
- National team: Israel
- Born: September 11, 1989 (age 36) Ethiopia
- Height: 1.75 m (5 ft 9 in)
- Weight: 56 kg (123 lb)

Sport
- Sport: Running
- Event: Marathon
- Updated on 10 August 2016

Ageze Guadie (Hebrew: גואדה אגזה; born September 11, 1989) is an Ethiopian-born Israeli Olympic marathon runner.

== Early and personal life ==
Born in Ethiopia, he is an Ethiopian Jew (Beta Israel) and is the seventh of nine children in his family. He made aliya and moved to Israel with his family at age 13, in 2002. His family lived in an immigrant absorption center in Beersheba, while he went to a boarding school near Hadera.

He served as a technical quartermaster in the Israel Defense Forces. After the army, he worked as a waiter in a cafe, and as a mover. He then became a sports teacher at a school in Netanya, Israel, where he now lives.

== Running career ==
He ran for the club Hapoel Emek Hefer, won Under-16 regional and national competitions at middle distances, and at the age of 16 won the Israeli cross country youth championship. His mother initially did not want him to compete in running, as she felt it was a difficult sport and she thought he would be too skinny. In 2012, he signed up for physical education studies at the Wingate Institute in Netanya, and trained with Israeli Olympic marathon runner Zohar Zimro.

In December 2015 he came in third with a time of 67:04 in the Israeli championships in the half marathon in Beit She'an, behind Marhu Teferi and Berihun Weve. He began to consider running a marathon for the first time, saying "I felt that if I did 21 kilometers in 1:07, I had the second half in my legs. Your gut tells you that you can do it. Go for it. I had faith and courage; it came from the heart."

Guadie completed his first marathon run, at the Rotterdam Marathon in the Netherlands in April 2016, in a time of 2:18:51. He came in 27th. His time was the second-best for an Israeli running his first marathon, after Tesama Moogas." He reflected, "This marathon taught me two things: Ability and courage. To believe in yourself and not be afraid, to go for broke, to turn the impossible into the possible."

With his time in the Rotterdam Marathon, which was nine seconds better than the Olympic qualification standard, he qualified for the 2016 Olympics. He competed for Israel at the 2016 Summer Olympics in the marathon, and finished 122nd with a time of 2:30:45. At the Seville Marathon in Spain in February 2020, he set his personal best with a time of 2:12:06. During that race, he also set a new personal best in half marathon (1:05:23).

== Personal bests ==
- 10,000 m - 29:55.63 (2018)
- Half Marathon - 1:05:23 (2020)
- Marathon - 2:12:06 (2020)

== See also ==
- List of select Jewish track and field athletes
