= Filimon Abraham =

German long-distance runner (born 1992)

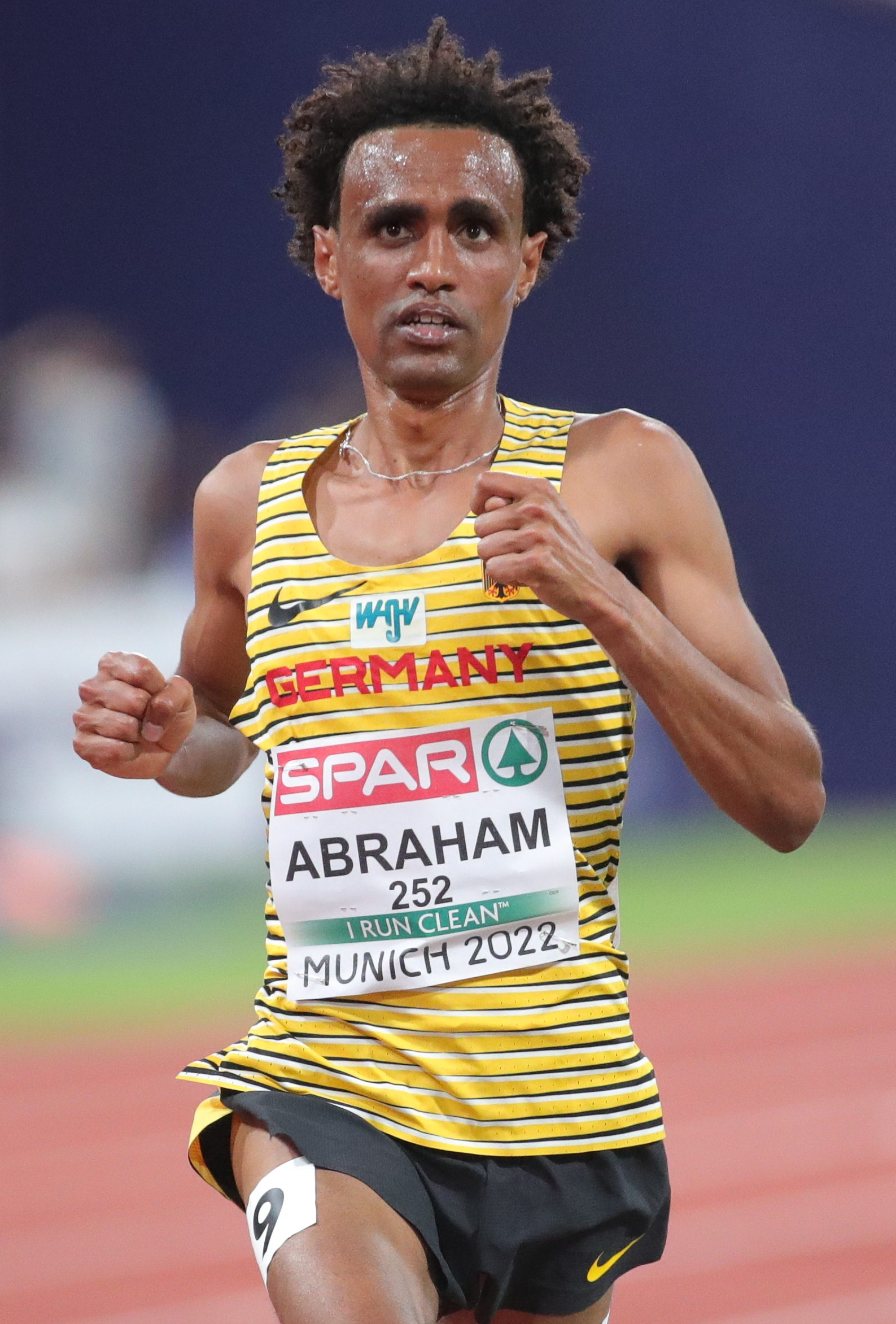
- Filimon Abraham at the Men's 10,000 Meters race at the 2022 European Championships

Personal information
- Nationality: German
- Born: 9 November 1992 (age 33) Ethiopia

Sport
- Sport: Athletics
- Event: Long-distance running
Medal record
Men's athletics
Representing Germany
European Championships
Bronze medal – third place	2024 Rome	Half Marathon team

Filimon Abraham (born 9 November 1992) is a German long distance runner. He won a bronze medal at the 2024 European Athletics Championships.

== Career ==
In October 2021, he ran for Germany and won the Nations Cup of the World Mountain Running Association (WMRA) in Chiavenna, Italy.

In December 2022, he finished fifth at the 2022 European Cross Country Championships in Turin.

In March 2023, he ran 2:08:22 at the Barcelona Marathon, finishing in tenth place and placing himself second overall on the German all-time list. It was his first completed marathon after he failed to finish in his two previous marathon races in Hamburg and Frankfurt in 2022. He finished ninth at the 2023 World Mountain and Trail Running Championships in Innsbruck in 2023.

He won a bronze medal at the 2024 European Athletics Championships in the Men's half marathon team event. In the individual race he placed 22nd.

== Personal life ==
As a refugee escaping Eritrea's authoritarian dictatorship under Isaias Afwerki, he came to Germany in 2014 and became based in Traunstein where he trained as an electrician.
