= Adam Craig (runner) =

British long-distance runner

Personal information
- Born: 9 May 1995 (age 30)

Sport
- Country: United Kingdom
- Sport: Athletics
- Event: Long-distance running

Adam Craig (born 9 May 1995) is a British long-distance runner. In 2020, he competed in the men's race at the 2020 World Athletics Half Marathon Championships held in Gdynia, Poland.

In 2019, he competed in the men's event at the 2019 European 10,000m Cup held in London, United Kingdom.
