= Ebba Tulu Chala =

Swedish athlete (born 1996)

Personal information
- Nationality: Swedish
- Born: 22 June 1996 (age 30)

Sport
- Sport: Track and Field
- Event: marathon
- Club: Keep Up RC

Ebba Tulu Chala (born 22 June 1996) is a Swedish athlete who competes in the marathon. He was born in Ethiopia and emigrated as a child.

== Early life ==
Chala is an Oromo from near Bekoji, where the altitude is between 2,500 and 3,000 metres. and although he was not a runner, he walked between one and two hours each way to school. He found his way to refugee accommodation in Salem, near Stockholm, where he stayed for a year. Two months after his arrival, at Sågbäcksgymnasiet, his school in Huddinge Municipality, he tried running and discovered he was very fast.

== Running career ==
Three weeks after his discovery, Chala was entered by his teacher in a 10,000 m race at Nacka, and came third with a time of 32.22. Since 2015, he has won one bronze and four silver medals at the Swedish Athletics Championships, his first for the marathon being silver in 2019.

At the Seville Marathon in February 2020, he reached the international qualifying standard for the Summer Olympics as well as the World Athletics Championships with a personal best time of 2:11:18; however, the Swedish Olympic standard is lower, at 2 hours, 11 minutes. Sidelined by injuries after that, he returned to run the Stockholm Marathon in 2021 and in early 2022 trained in Ethiopia together with the Iranian-Swedish marathoner Mohammad Reza. He was not selected for the 2021 Olympics.

Initially threatened with deportation, Chala became a naturalised Swedish citizen on 15 May 2022.

He was selected for the Swedish team to compete over 1500 metres at the 2025 World Athletics Championships in Tokyo, Japan, in September 2025.

In August 2026, he competed at the 2026 European Athletics Championships in Birmingham, England, placing thirteenth overall in the men's marathon. The following month, Chala won the 30km race at the TCS Lidingöloppet in Lidingö, Sweden, as the World Athletics Cross Country Tour season began on 26 September.
