= Amanal Petros =

German long-distance runner

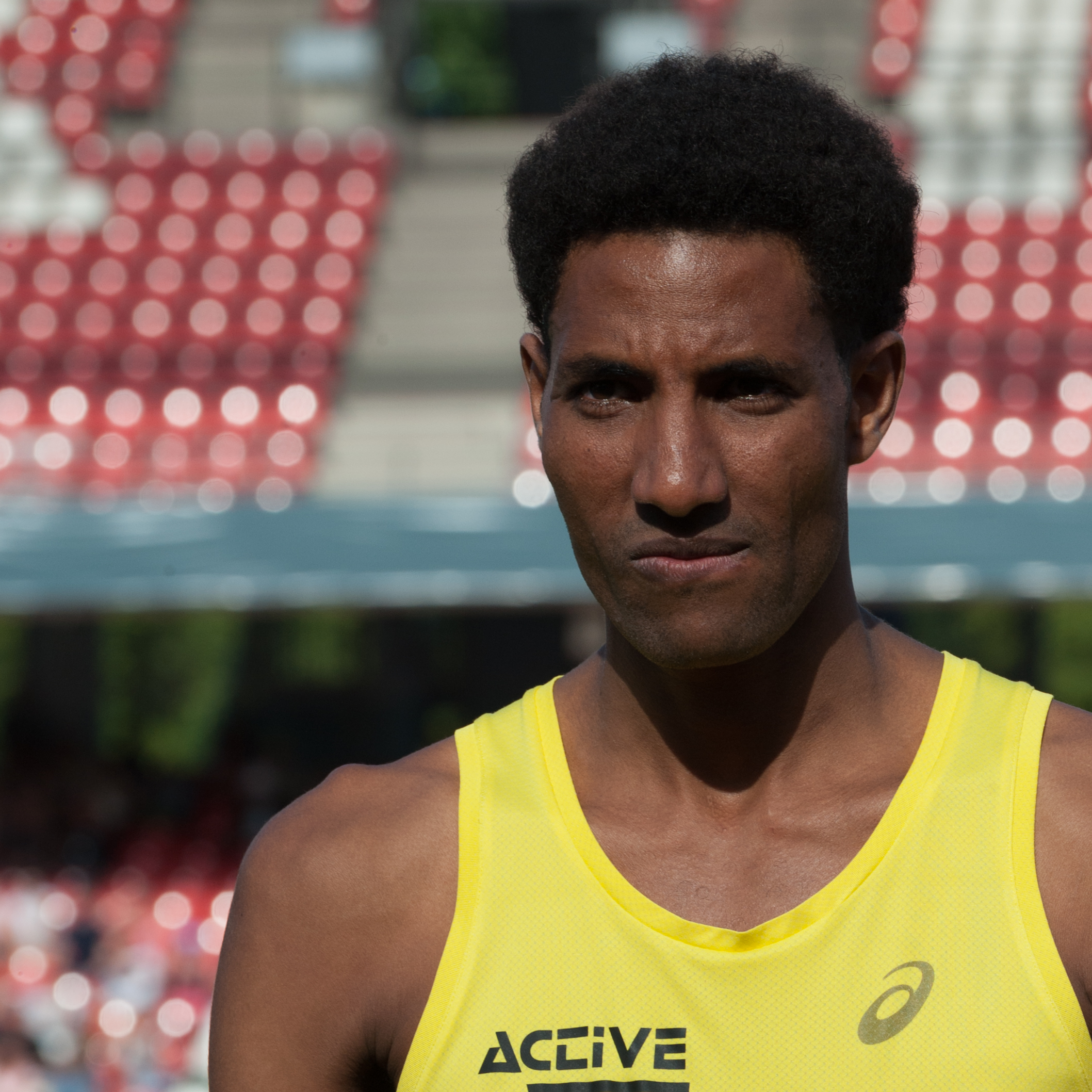

Personal information
- Born: 17 May 1995 (age 31) Eritrea

Sport
- Country: Germany
- Sport: Long-distance running

Achievements and titles
- Personal bests: Half Marathon: 59:22 NR (Berlin 2026); Marathon: 2:04:03 NR (valencia 2025)
Medal record
Men's long-distance running
Representing Germany
World Championships
Silver medal – second place	2025 Tokyo	Marathon
European Athletics Championships
Gold medal – first place	2026 Birmingham	Marathon
Silver medal – second place	2022 Munich	Marathon Team
Silver medal – second place	2026 Birmingham	Marathon team
Bronze medal – third place	2024 Rome	Half Marathon
Military World Games
Silver medal – second place	2019 Wuhan	5000 m
Silver medal – second place	2019 Wuhan	10,000 m
European Athletics U23 Championships
Silver medal – second place	2017 Bydgoszcz	10,000 m

Amanal Petros (born 17 May 1995) is an Eritrean-born German long-distance runner and as of April 2025, the national record holder in the half marathon with a time of 59:31, set at the 2025 Berlin Half Marathon. He also currently holds the marathon national record of 2:04:03.

== Early life ==
Petros was born in Eritrea's port city of Assab. He escaped with his mother and sisters to Ethiopia at the age of 2 during the Border War with Ethiopia. In January 2012, he went to Germany by himself as a refugee. He attained German citizenship in 2015.

== Career ==
He won the bronze medal in the men's 5000 metres at the 2015 German Athletics Championships held in Nuremberg, Germany. In 2017, he won the silver medal in the men's 10,000 metres at the European Athletics U23 Championships held in Bydgoszcz, Poland. He also competed in the men's 5000 metres event where he finished in 4th place.

In July 2019, he competed in the men's event at the European 10,000m Cup held in London, United Kingdom. A few months later, he won the men's half marathon at the Cologne Marathon in Cologne, Germany. In the same year, he also won the silver medal in the men's 5000 metres and men's 10,000 metres at the 2019 Military World Games held in Wuhan, China. In 2020, he competed in the men's race at the World Athletics Half Marathon Championships held in Gdynia, Poland. In 2025 he set the German National Record in the Marathon distance at the Valencia Marathon with a time of 2:04:03.

At the 2026 European Championships in Birmingham, England, he won the gold medal in the marathon in a new championship record time of 2:09:11.

== International competitions ==
Year	Competition	Venue	Position	Event	Notes
Representing Germany
2019	Military World Games	Wuhan, China	5000 m	2nd	14:09.16
2019	Military World Games	Wuhan, China	10,000 m	2nd	28:44.30
2022	European Athletics Championships	Munich, Germany	Marathon	4th	2:10:39
2022	European Athletics Championships	Munich, Germany	Marathon Team	2nd	6:35:52
2026	European Athletics Championships	Birmingham, UK	Marathon	1st	2:09:11
2026	European Athletics Championships	Birmingham, UK	Marathon Team	2nd	6:29:03
