= Richard Ringer =

German long-distance runner (born 1989)

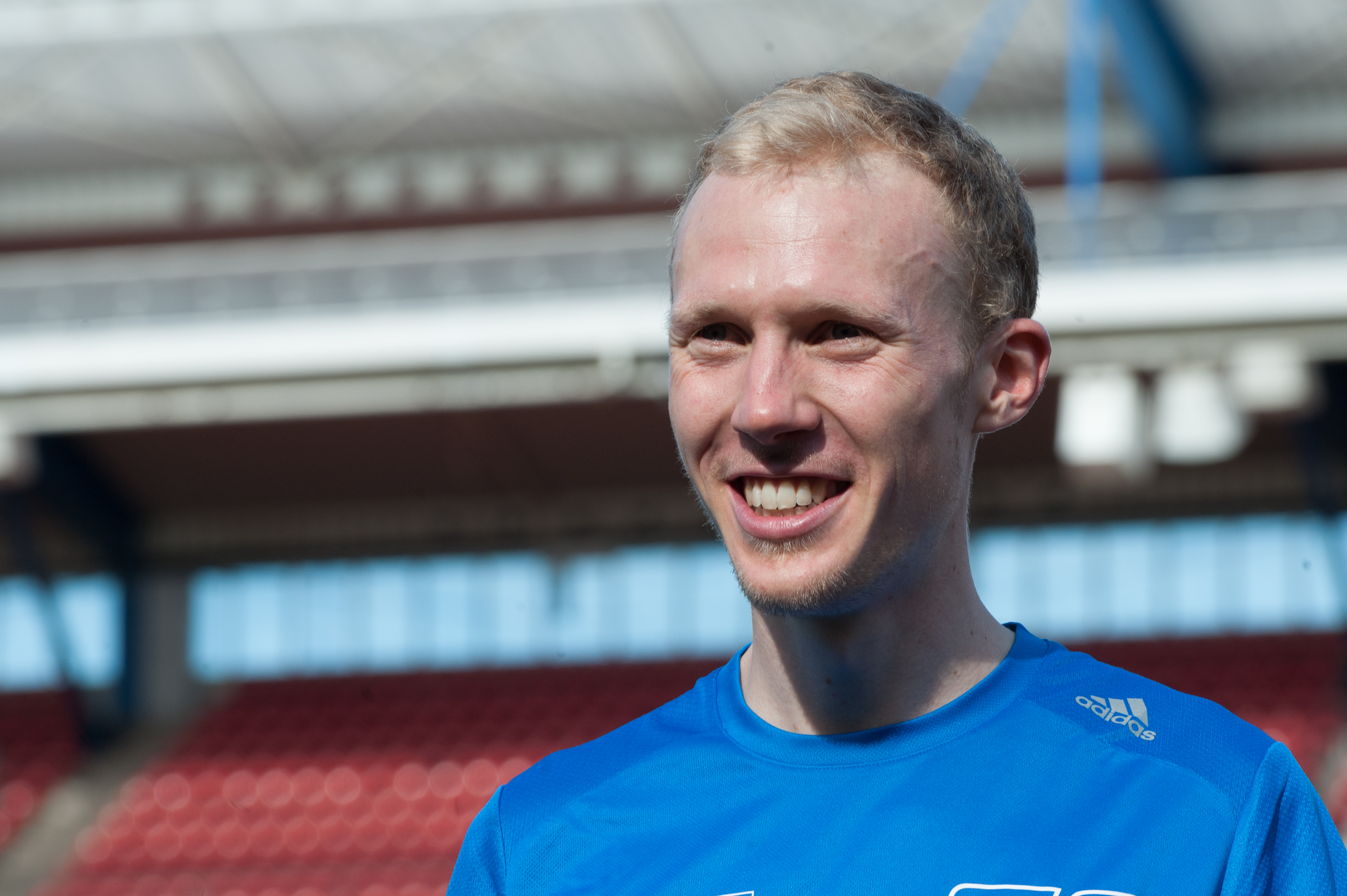
- Richard Ringer 2015

Personal information
- Nationality: German
- Born: 27 February 1989 (age 37) Überlingen, West Germany
- Height: 1.82 m (6 ft 0 in)
- Weight: 63 kg (139 lb)

Sport
- Sport: Athletics
- Event: Long-distance running
- Club: LC Rehlingen
Medal record
Men's athletics
Representing Germany
European Championships
Gold medal – first place	2022 Munich	Marathon
Silver medal – second place	2022 Munich	Marathon Team
Silver medal – second place	2026 Birmingham	Marathon team
Bronze medal – third place	2016 Amsterdam	5000 m
European Indoor Championships
Bronze medal – third place	2017 Belgrade	3000 m

Richard Ringer (born 27 February 1989 in Überlingen) is a German athlete specialising in long-distance and cross-country running. He won the bronze medal at the 2013 Summer Universiade, and finished fourth at the 2014 European Championships and fifth at the 2015 European Indoor Championships. His greatest success is his victory in the Marathon at the 2022 European Championships in Munich.

== Competition record ==
Year	Competition	Venue	Position	Event	Notes
Representing Germany
2007	European Junior Championships	Hengelo, Netherlands	13th	5000 m	15:16.03
2008	World Junior Championships	Bydgoszcz, Poland	16th (h)	1500 m	3:50.77
2011	European U23 Championships	Ostrava, Czech Republic	7th	5000 m	14:24.86
2013	Universiade	Kazan, Russia	3rd	5000 m	13:37.18
2014	European Championships	Zürich, Switzerland	4th	5000 m	14:10.92
2015	European Indoor Championships	Prague, Czech Republic	5th	3000 m	7:48.44
2015	World Championships	Beijing, China	14th	5000 m	14:03.72
2016	European Championships	Amsterdam, Netherlands	3rd	5000 m	13:40.85
2016	Olympic Games	Rio de Janeiro, Brazil	38th (h)	5000 m	14:05.01
2017	European Indoor Championships	Belgrade, Serbia	3rd	3000 m	8:01.01
2017	World Championships	London, United Kingdom	32nd (h)	5000 m	13:36.87
2018	World Indoor Championships	Birmingham, United Kingdom	–	3000 m	DQ
2018	European Championships	Berlin, Germany	–	10,000 m	DNF
2019	World Championships	Doha, Qatar	30th (h)	5000 m	13:49.20
2021	Olympic Games	Sapporo, Japan	26th	Marathon	2:16:08
2022	European Championships	Munich, Germany	1st	Marathon	2:10:21
2025	World Championships	Tokyo, Japan	13th	Marathon	2:11:14
2026	European Championships	Birmingham, United Kingdom	10th	Marathon	2:10:05

== Personal bests ==
Outdoor

- 1500 metres – 3:38.83 (Montbéliard 2016)
- 3000 metres – 7:46.37 (Dessau-Roßlau 2016)
- 5000 metres – 13:10.94 (Heusden-Zolder 2015)
- 10,000 metres – 27:36.52 (London 2018)
- Half marathon – 1:01:09 (Barcelona 2023)
- Marathon – 2:05:47 (Valencia 2024)

Indoor

- 1500 metres – 3:45.40 (Stuttgart 2011)
- 3000 metres – 7:46.18 (Karlsruhe 2015)
