= Gashau Ayale =

Israeli marathon runner (born 1996)

Gashau Ayale גשאו איילה
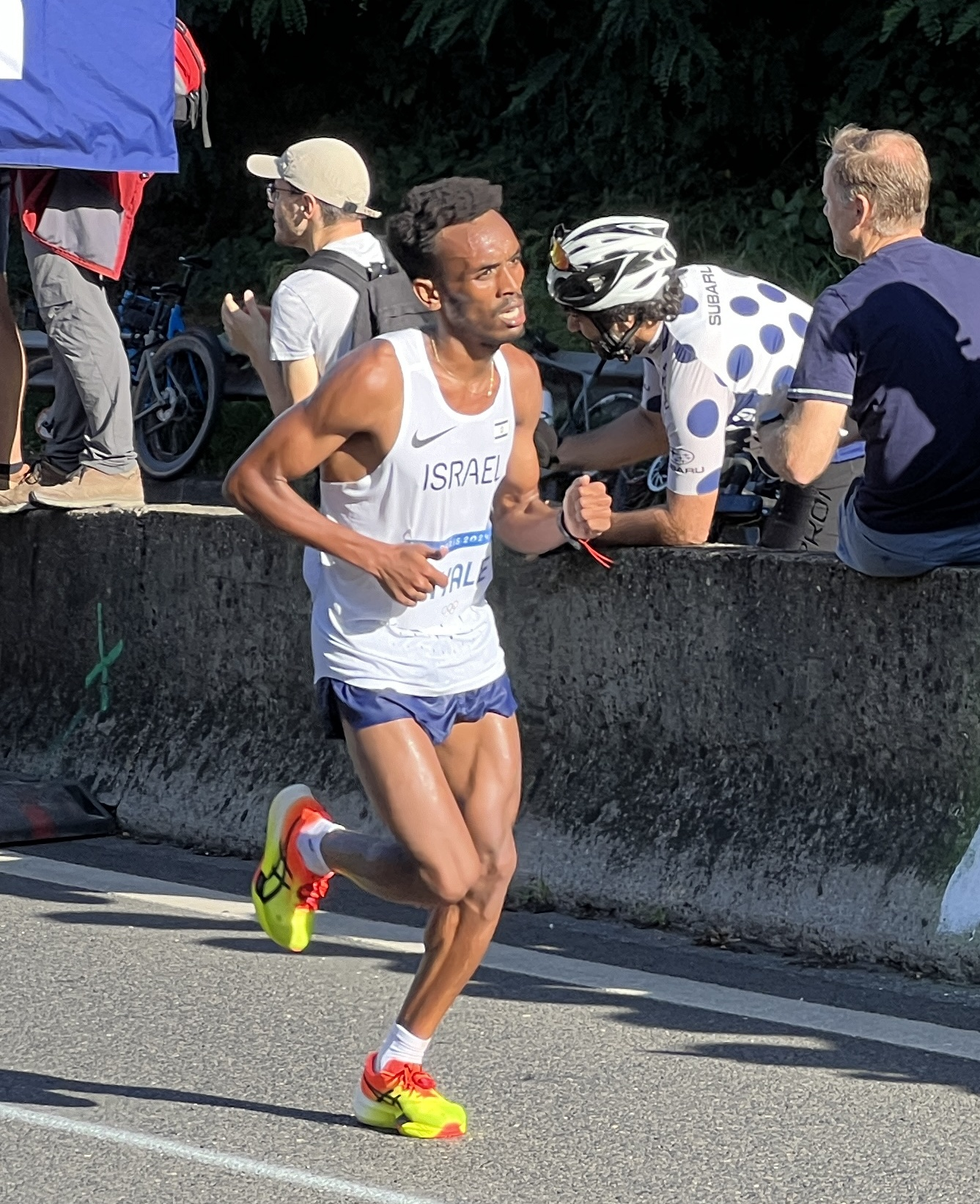
- 2024 Summer Olympics

Personal information
- Citizenship: Israeli
- Born: 22 August 1996 (age 30) Gojam, Ethiopia
- Home town: Jaffa, Israel
- Height: 1.72 m (5 ft 8 in)

Sport
- Country: Israel
- Sport: Athletics
- Event: Long-distance running
- Club: Maccabi Tel Aviv

Achievements and titles
- Personal bests: Marathon: 2:04:53 (Sevilla) 2024 (NR); 10,000 metres: 27:49.88 (London) 2022 (NR)
Medal record
Men's athletics
Representing Israel
European Championships
Gold medal – first place	2022 Munich	Marathon team
Gold medal – first place	2026 Birmingham	Marathon team
Silver medal – second place	2024 Rome	Half Marathon team
Bronze medal – third place	2022 Munich	Marathon
Bronze medal – third place	2026 Birmingham	Marathon
European Running Championships
Gold medal – first place	2025 Brussels‑Leuven	Marathon team
Silver medal – second place	2025 Brussels‑Leuven	Marathon

Gashau Ayale (Hebrew: גשאו איילה; born 22 August 1996) is an Israeli long-distance runner. In May 2022, Ayale set an Israeli record in the 10,000 metres, running 27:49.88. He won the bronze medal in the marathon at the European Athletics Championships, and a gold medal in the 2022 team European Marathon Cup. In February 2024, he won a bronze medal at the Seville Marathon with a time of 2:04:53, setting a new Israeli record. Ayale represented Israel at the 2024 Paris Olympics in the Men's marathon, and came in 31st.

== Biography ==
Ayale was born in the village of Gojam in Ethiopia to Tabak (his father) and Tesfia (his mother), and is Jewish. He was born into the Beta Israel ethno-religious community of Ethiopian Jews. Fellow Israeli long-distance runner and Ethiopian Jew Girmaw Amare was born in the same area nine years prior. At two years of age he and his family moved to Gondar, Ethiopia.

Ayale immigrated to Israel in 2010, at 13 years of age, with his parents and five brothers. They initially lived in an absorption center in Safed, Israel, and then later the family moved to Jaffa, Israel. His father worked as a cook, and his mother as a cleaner. He began running at 18, after initial interest in soccer. He trains with Maccabi Tel Aviv.

== Running career ==
=== 2017–19; European Cup bronze medal ===
On July 13, 2017, at the 2017 Maccabiah Games in Jerusalem, Israel, in the 5000 metre race Ayale ran it in 14:46.25, winning a silver medal.

On November 17, 2018, in the Hasharon 10 km, he ran a 29:23, winning a bronze medal.

On January 4, 2019, Ayale won the Tiberias 10 km in 29:37.

On July 6, 2019, at the 2019 European 10,000m Cup in London he ran a 28:50.47, winning a bronze medal.

On July 24, 2019, at the Israeli Championships in Tel Aviv, Israel, in the 1,500 metre race Ayale ran a 3:48.81, winning a silver medal.

On July 25, 2019, at the Israeli Championships in the 5000 metre race Ayale ran a 14:09.82, winning a bronze medal.

=== 2020–22; European Championships bronze medal ===
On September 18, 2020, Ayale won the Tel Aviv 15 km in a time of 44:36.

On February 25, 2022, in the Tel Aviv Half Marathon, Ayale ran a 1:03:25 and won a silver medal.

On April 26, 2022, at the Israeli 10,000 m Championships in Tel Aviv he ran a 28:03.20, winning a silver medal.

In May 2022, in the European Cup in London, Ayale set a national record in the 10,000 metres, running 27:49.88 to become the first Israeli to break 28 minutes in the event.

On August 15, 2022, Ayale won the bronze medal in the marathon at the European Athletics Championships held in Munich, Germany, with a time of 2:10:29, directly behind fellow Israeli Maru Teferi. He was also a member of the gold medal team for Israel winning the European Marathon Cup at the same competition. He said, referring to the Munich massacre, "Fifty years after what happened here, winning a medal and waving the Israeli flag is just so sweet."

On December 10, 2022, in the Tiberias Half Marathon, Ayale ran a 1:02:38 and won a silver medal.

=== 2023–present; Seville Marathon bronze medal ===
On June 10, 2023, Ayale won the Israeli League Cup 5000 metre race in 13:47.78.

On February 18, 2024, Ayale won a bronze medal at the Seville Marathon, in Sevilla, Spain, with a time of 2:04:53, setting a new Israeli record as he broke his own national record by 40 seconds. It was his first international marathon, and the second marathon in his life. It was the 84th-fastest marathon of all time.

In June 2024, Maru Teferi (fourth place; 1:01:07—seven seconds behind the winner), Ayale (seventh place; 1:01:28), and Girmaw Amare (ninth place) secured Team Israel's second-place finish in the team half marathon event in the 2024 European Athletics Championships in Rome, Italy. A half marathon was run rather than a full marathon because of the proximity of the race to the Paris Olympics marathon.

==== 2024 Paris Olympics ====
Ayale represented Israel at the 2024 Paris Olympics in the Men's marathon. He said: "It is a great honor for me to represent Israel, especially in this painful time for the people of Israel. I look forward to wearing the uniform of the Israeli national team and running through the streets of Paris with the Israeli flag on my chest. I promise to do my very best to represent our country with honor." He ran it in a time of 2:11:36 (as Tamirat Tola of Ethiopia won in a time of 2:06:26), and came in 31st.

==== 2025 ====
In March 2025, Ayale became the first Israeli in history to break the 60 minutes barrier in the half marathon distance, setting a new Israeli record at the Lisbon Half Marathon with a time of 59:59.

== Personal life ==
Ayale has a younger brother, Yehuda Darba Ayala, who holds Israel's national U23 5000 metres record.

== Personal bests ==
- 3000 metres – 8:05.64 (Tel Aviv 2020)
- 5000 metres – 13:47.78 (Tel Aviv 2023)
- 10,000 metres – 27:49.88 (London 2022)

Road

- 10 kilometres – 29:23 (Hod HaSharon 2018)
- 20 kilometres – 56:58 (Lisbon 2025) NR
- Half marathon – 59:59 (Lisbon 2025) NR
- Marathon – 2:04:53 (Seville 2024)

== See also ==
- List of European Athletics Championships medalists (men)
- List of Israeli records in athletics
- List of select Jewish track and field athletes
- National records in the marathon
- Sports in Israel
