= Nicolas Navarro (runner) =

French long-distance runner

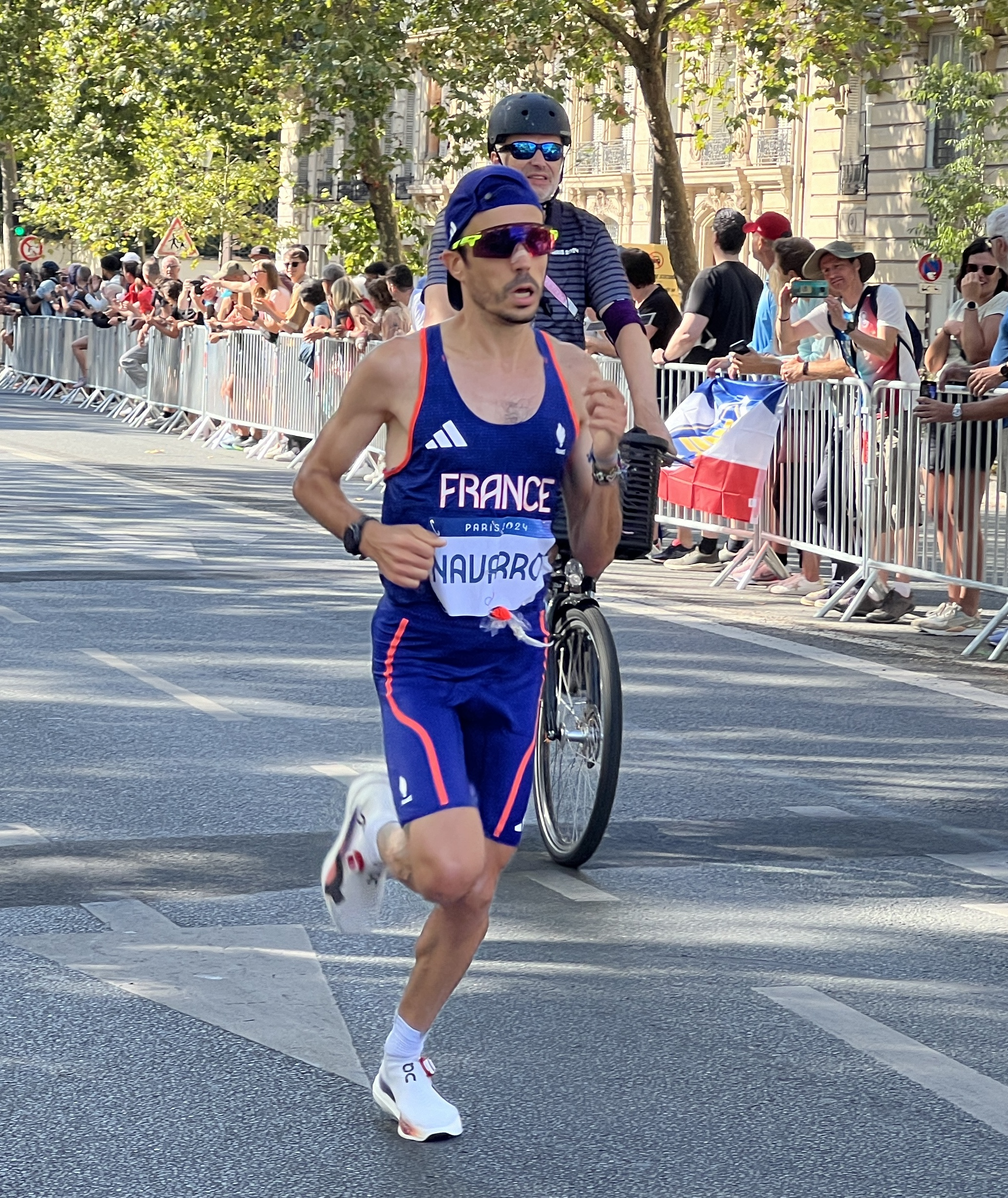
- Navarro in 2024

Personal information
- Born: 12 March 1991 (age 35) Toulon, France
- Height: 1.70 m (5 ft 7 in)

Sport
- Country: France
- Sport: Athletics
- Event: Long-distance running

Achievements and titles
- Personal best: Marathon: 2:05:53 (Valencia 2023)

Nicolas Navarro (born 12 March 1991) is a French long-distance runner. He competed in the men's race at the 2020 World Athletics Half Marathon Championships held in Gdynia, Poland. He represented France at the 2020 Summer Olympics in Tokyo, Japan.
