= Yitayew Abuhay =

Israeli long-distance runner

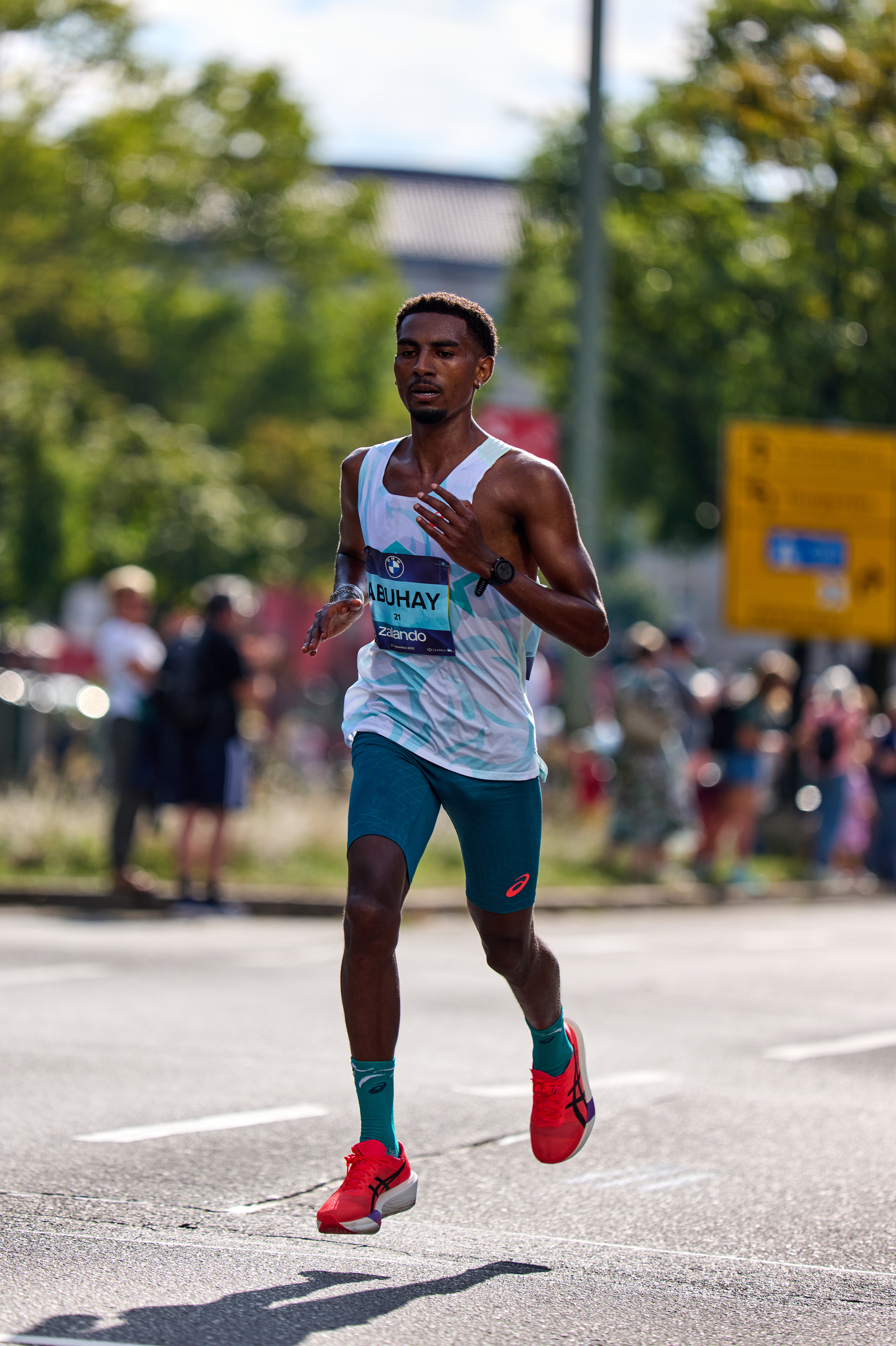
- Abuyah at the 2025 Berlin Marathon

Personal information
- Native name: ייטאייב אבוהאי
- Born: 1 December 1996 (age 28)

Sport
- Country: Israel
- Sport: Athletics
- Event: Long-distance running

Yitayew Abuhay (Hebrew: ייטאייב אבוהאי; born 1 December 1996) is an Israeli long-distance runner. In 2020, he competed in the men's race at the 2020 World Athletics Half Marathon Championships held in Gdynia, Poland.

In 2019, he competed in the men's event at the 2019 European 10,000m Cup held in London, United Kingdom. His personal bests are 1:04:21 - Half Marathon in coemption in Gdynia, at 17.10.2020, 28:14.31 - 10,000 Metres in coemption Parliament Hill Fields Athletics Track, London at 20.5.2023.
