= Ibrahim Chakir =

Spanish long-distance runner

Personal information
- Born: 4 September 1994 (age 31)

Sport
- Country: Spain
- Sport: Long-distance running
- Event(s): Half marathon, Marathon

Achievements and titles
- Personal bests: 3000 metres steeplechase: 8:27.52 (Barcelona 2022); Road; Half marathon: 1:01:40 (Valencia 2024); Marathon: 2:07:32 (Valencia 2024)

Ibrahim Chakir (born 4 September 1994) is a Spanish long-distance runner who represented Spain at the 2024 Olympics in the marathon. He also represented Spain at the 2023 World Athletics Championships again in the marathon and the 2024 European Athletics Championships in the half marathon. He became the Spanish National Champion in 2024 at the Seville Marathon.
