= Israel at the 2012 European Athletics Championships =

Israel is represented by 10 athletes (7 men and 3 women) at the 2012 European Athletics Championships held in Helsinki, Finland.

== The team ==
The Israeli team to the 21st European Athletics Champs includes 10 athletes (7 men and 3 women). Donald Sanford is the top name in the men team along with talented high jumper Dmitriy Kroyter and improved triple jumper Yochai Halevi. Pole vaulter Jillian Schwartz is the most experienced from the female trio. She was World Championships finalist in 2005 when competing for USA.

== Participants ==
Event	Men	Women
100m	Demitri Barski	
400m	Donald Sanford	
4 × 400 m	Dustin Emrani; Donald Sanford; Ruben Majola; Yuriy Shapsai	
800m	Dustin Emrani	
3000 m steeplechase	Itai Maggidi	
Pole Vault		Jillian Schwartz
Triple Jump	Yochai Halevi	
High Jump	Dmitriy Kroyter	Maayan Furman
Shot Put		Anastasia Muchkaev
