= Haimro Alame =

Israeli long-distance runner (born 1990)

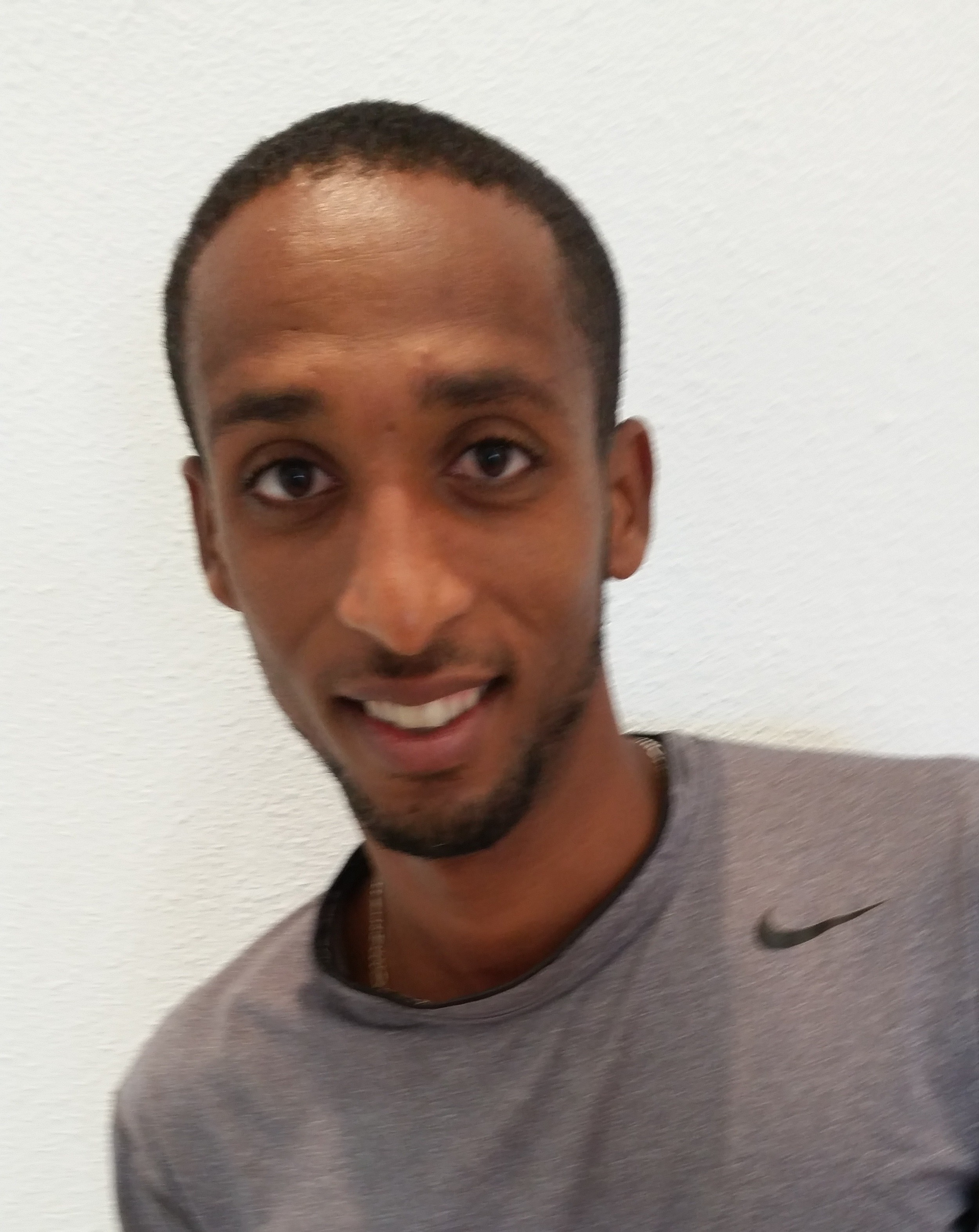
- Alame in 2016

Personal information
- Native name: አይሜሮ አላሚያ איימרו עלמיה
- Nationality: Ethiopian (former), Israeli (current)
- Born: Haimro Almaya; Aimeru Almeya; 8 June 1990 (age 36) Ethiopia
- Height: 1.75 m (5 ft 9 in)
- Weight: 55 kg (121 lb)

Sport
- Country: Israel
- Sport: Running
- Events: 10,000 metres, Half marathon, Marathon
- Club: Hapoel Athletic Oren Hasharon

Achievements and titles
- Personal bests: 1500 m: 3:47.73; 5000 m: 13:52.76; 10,000 m: 28:09.42 (national record); Marathon: 2:06:04
Medal record
Men's athletics
Representing Israel
European Championships
Gold medal – first place	2026 Birmingham	Marathon team

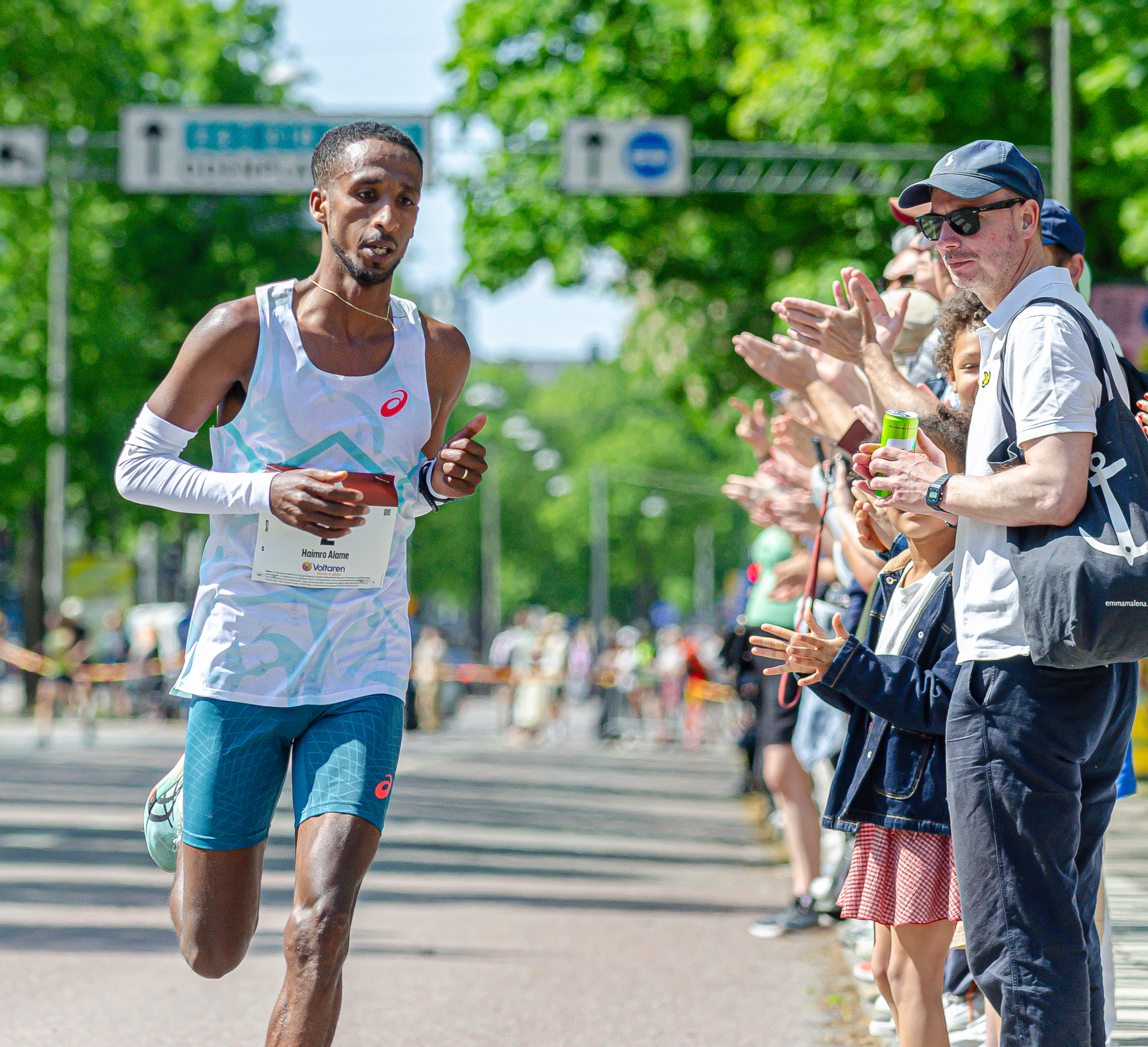
Haimro Alame during Stockholm Marathon 2025.

Haimro Alame (Amharic: አይሜሮ አላሚያ; Hebrew: איימרו עלמיה; born 8 June 1990), also known as Haimro Almaya and Aimeru Almeya, is a runner. Born in Ethiopia, he represents Israel internationally. In the 2014 European Athletics Team Championships he took second in the 5000 metres, and in the 2015 European Games in Baku, he came in third in the 5000 m. Alame was as of 2018 the Israeli record holder at 10,000 metres. He represented Israel at the 2020 Summer Olympics in men's marathon.

== Early life ==
Alame was born in Ethiopia, to a Beta Israel (Ethiopian-Jewish) family, and immigrated to Israel with his family in 2004. His track club is Hapoel Athletic Oren Hasharon.

== Athlete career ==
Alame was as of 2019 the Israeli national record holder at 10,000m. As of 2018 his personal bests were 10,000m: 28:09.42; 5000m: 13:52.76; 1500m: 3:47.73.

Alame came in 1st in the Israeli national championships in the 1500m in 2014, 5000m in 2013/2014/2015/2016, and 10,000m in 2014. Alame won the 2015 Israeli Cross Country Championships (10.7 km). In 2013 he set the course record in the 10000m in the Jerusalem Marathon with a time of 31:19. He won the 2017 Tel Aviv International Half Marathon, and came in 2nd in the 2018 Tiberias Half Marathon. In 2018 he came in 10th in the IAAF World Half Marathon team event.

In the 2014 European Athletics Team Championships Alame took second in the 5000 m behind Hayle Ibrahimov. Representing Israel at the 2015 European Games in Baku, he came in third in the 5000 m event, with a time of 14:38.96 min behind Roman Prodius and Hayle Ibrahimov, and earned a bronze medal.

=== Marathon ===
In the marathon Alame came in 22nd in Rotterdam in 2017. He won the 2019 Tiberias Marathon with a time of 2:15:16. He won the 2025 Houston Marathon with a time of 2:08:17.

His personal best in the marathon is 2:06:04, achieved at the Valencia Marathon in December 2023.

Alame qualified to represent Israel at the 2020 Summer Olympics in the men's marathon event, in which he came 36th with a time of 2:17:17. He qualified after running the 2019 Valencia Marathon in 2:11:02 hours, the third-best Israeli time ever.

In 2025 Alame came fourth at the European Running Championships in Brussels, with a time of 2:09:27. He also won a gold medal in the marathon team event. At the 2025 World Athletics Championships, Alame came fourth with a time of 2:10:03, less than 10 seconds behind third place.
