= Girmaw Amare =

Israeli runner (born 1987)

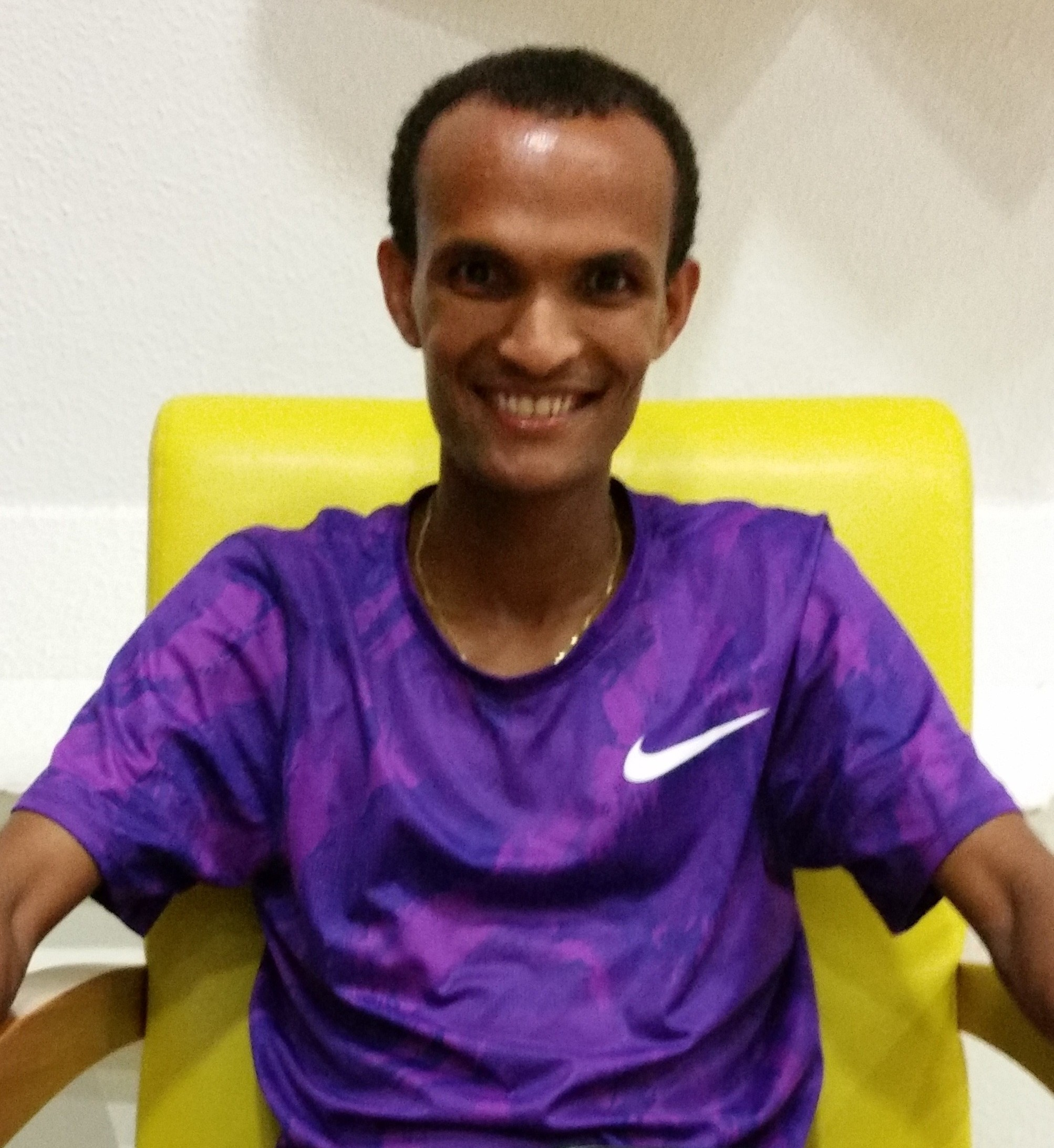
- Amare in 2016

Personal information
- Native name: ግርማው አማረ גירמה אמרה
- Citizenship: Ethiopian (former), Israeli (current)
- Born: 26 October 1987 (age 38) West Gojjam Zone, Ethiopia
- Height: 1.72 m (5 ft 8 in)
- Weight: 60 kg (132 lb)

Sport
- Country: Israel
- Sport: Running
- Events: 10,000 m, half marathon, marathon, and half marathon team event

Achievements and titles
- Personal bests: Marathon: 2:05:52 (Valencia) (2023); Half marathon: 1:02:00 (Berlin) 2022

Girmaw Amare (Amharic: ግርማው አማረ; Hebrew: גירמה אמרה; born 26 October 1987) is an Olympic runner who competes in the 10,000 m, half marathon, marathon, and half marathon team event. Born in Ethiopia, he represented Israel at the 2020 Summer Olympics. In 2022, Amare won a team gold medal in the 2022 European Marathon Cup at the 2022 European Athletics Championships. In 2023 at the Valencia Marathon, Amare ran a personal best 2:05:52. Amare represented Israel at the 2024 Paris Olympics in the Men's marathon, and placed 44th.

== Biography ==
Amare was born in West Gojjam Zone, Ethiopia, and is Jewish. He was born to an Ethiopian-Jewish family, and grew up in a village that had neither electricity nor running water. He immigrated to Israel with his family in 2006, at 19 years of age. He attended Wingate Institute. He is married, and has a daughter named Adi.

Amare said: "Ethiopians are used to their runners leaving because they have been bought by other countries who want them to run under another flag. But I proudly tell people that I left because I wanted to go to Israel. We left because we are Jews. It is such a feeling of pride to wave our flag, and to show the world that we can achieve great things.”

== Running career ==
=== 2016–19; national championships ===
In June 2016 Amare ran in the 5,000 metres Israeli Championships, with a time of 14:02.67, winning a bronze medal.

In January 2017 Amare won a silver medal in the 40th Sea of Galilee Tiberias International Marathon with a time of 2:17:20.

In August 2017 he represented Israel at the 2017 World Championships in Athletics, coming in 63rd in the marathon with a time of 2:26:37.

In January 2018 Amare won the 41st Sea of Galilee Tiberias International Marathon with a time of 2:15.30, the sixth-best time ever by an Israeli, and won the Israeli national championship.

In February 2018, he won the Israeli 15 km Challenge in Rishon Letzion, Israel, with a time of 44:55.

In March 2018 Amare competed at the 2018 IAAF World Half Marathon Championships, coming in 10th in the Men's Half Marathon Team Event and 52nd in the Men's Half Marathon with a time of 1:03:19.

In July 2018 he won the 5,000 metres Israeli Championships with a time of 13:56.91.

In December 2018, at the Valencia Marathon in Valencia, Spain, Amare ran a 2:12:37, setting a new Israeli record.

In February 2019, he won the Israeli 15 km Championships in Rishon Letzion, Israel, with a time of 45:13.

In May 2019 Amare came in eighth in the Prague Marathon with a time of 2:09:54, again setting a new Israeli record.

=== 2020–21; 2020 Olympics ===
In February 2020 at the Seville Marathon in Seville, Spain, Amare ran a 2:07:28, coming in 11th place.

In July 2020 at the 1,500 metres Israeli Championships, he ran a 3:52.06, winning a silver medal.

In March 2021 at the Agmon Hahula Marathon in Israel, Amare ran a 2:07:50, winning a silver medal. In April 2021 at the Israeli 10,000m Championships he ran a 28:21.27, winning a silver medal.

Amare represented Israel at the 2020 Summer Olympics in the marathon on August 8, 2021, in Hokkaido, Japan, coming in 28th with a time of 2:16:17.

=== 2022–present; European Marathon Cup gold medal ===
In April 2022 at the Berlin Half Marathon in Berlin, Germany, Amare ran a personal best 1:02:00, coming in 13th. That same month at the Israeli 10,000m Championships he ran a 28:24.93, winning a bronze medal.

In August 2022, Amare won a team gold medal in the 2022 European Marathon Cup at the 2022 European Athletics Championships in Munich, Germany, as he ran a 2:11:32.

In December 2022 at the Tiberias Half Marathon he ran a 1:03:21, winning a bronze medal.

In June 2023 Amare won the 5,000 metre Israeli League Cup with a time of 14:28.32.

In December 2023 at the 2023 Valencia Marathon in Valencia, Spain Amare ran a personal best 2:05:52, coming in 13th.

In June 2024, Maru Teferi (fourth place; 1:01:07—seven seconds behind the winner), Gashau Ayale (seventh place; 1:01:28), and Amare (ninth place; 1:01:39) secured Team Israel's second-place finish in the team half marathon event in the 2024 European Athletics Championships in Rome, Italy. A half marathon was run rather than a full marathon because of the proximity of the race to the Paris Olympics marathon.

==== 2024 Paris Olympics ====
Amare represented Israel at the 2024 Paris Olympics in the Men's marathon, beginning at the Hôtel de Ville and ending up at Les Invalides. He ran it in a time of 2:12:51 (as Tamirat Tola of Ethiopia won in a time of 2:06:26), and came in 44th.

== Personal bests ==
1,500 metres - 3:46.70 (2015)

3,000 metres - 8:02.73 (2020)

5,000 metres - 13:48.32 (2022)

5 kilometres - 13:51 (2021)s

10,000 metres - 28:10.32 (2015)

15 kilometres - 44:55 (2018)

One hour run - 20,584 metres (2020) (Israeli record)

Half marathon - 1:01:31 (2024)

Marathon - 2:05:52 (2023)

== See also ==
- List of Israeli records in athletics
- Sports in Israel
