= Maru Teferi =

Israeli marathon runner (born 1992)

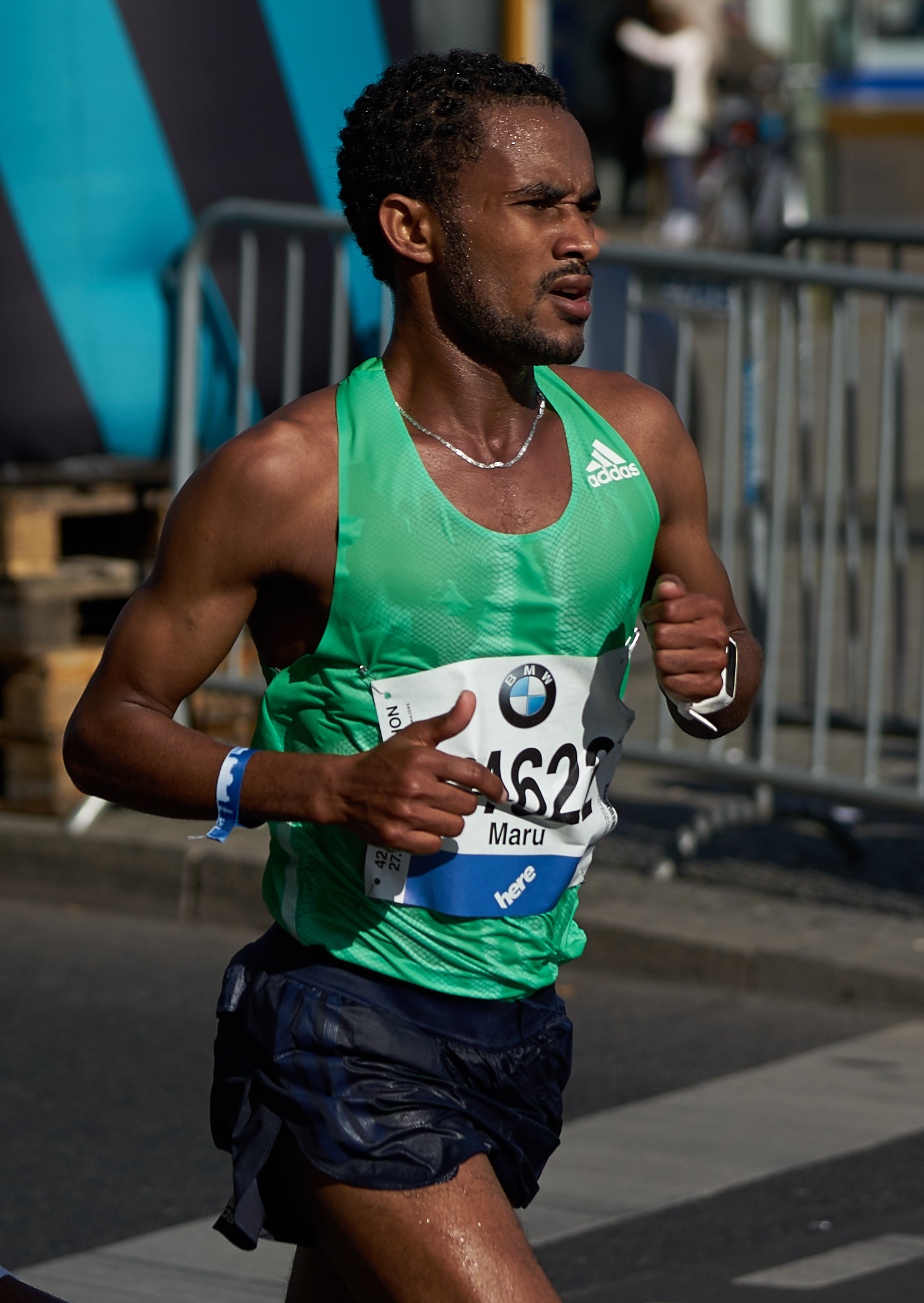
- Teferi at the 2015 Berlin Marathon

Personal information
- Native name: ማሩ ተፈሪ מארו טפרי
- Full name: Maru Abinet Teferi
- Citizenship: Ethiopian (former), Israeli (current)
- Born: 17 August 1992 (age 34) Dangila, Ethiopia
- Home town: Kiryat Ata, Israel
- Height: 1.64 m (5 ft 5 in)
- Weight: 52 kg (115 lb)
- Spouse: Selamawit Teferi

Sport
- Country: Israel
- Sport: Running
- Events: Half marathon, Marathon
- Club: Maccabi Tel Aviv
- Team: NN Running Team

Achievements and titles
- Personal bests: Marathon: 2:04:44 (Valencia) (2022) (NR); Half marathon: 1:00:52 (Tallinn) 2019 (NR)
Medal record
Men's athletics
Representing Israel
World Championships
Silver medal – second place	2023 Budapest	Marathon
European Championships
Gold medal – first place	2022 Munich	Marathon team
Silver medal – second place	2022 Munich	Marathon
Silver medal – second place	2024 Rome	Half Marathon team
European Running Championships
Gold medal – first place	2025 Brussels‑Leuven	Marathon team
Bronze medal – third place	2025 Brussels‑Leuven	Marathon
- Updated on 13 April 2025

Maru Abinet Teferi (Amharic: ማሩ ኣቢነት ተፈሪ; Hebrew: מארו אבינת טפרי; born 17 August 1992), also known as Teferi Marhu, is an Israeli marathon and half marathon runner, and an Olympian. He won a silver medal in men's marathon at the 2023 World Athletics Championships, a silver medal in marathon at the 2022 European Athletics Championships, a gold medal in the 2022 European Marathon Cup, and the gold medal at the 2022 Fukuoka Marathon. He represented Israel at the 2016 Summer Olympics in the men's marathon, and again represented Israel at the 2020 Summer Olympics in the 2020 Olympic Marathon. He has set Israeli records in both the marathon and half marathon. Teferi represented Israel at the 2024 Paris Olympics in the Men's marathon, and came in 26th.

== Biography ==
Teferi was born in Dangila, Ethiopia, and is Jewish. He was born to an Ethiopian-Jewish family He immigrated to Israel at the age of 14 in 2006 along with most of his family. While studying at the Ben Shemen Youth Village, he started training for long-distance runs.

His wife Selamawit "Selam" Dagnachew Teferi, whom he married in January 2017, was born in Ethiopia and became an Israeli citizen in 2018 on account of their marriage. She is a mid- and long-distance runner also qualified to compete for Israel at the 2020 Summer Olympics. They live in Kiryat Ata, in Haifa, and train together.

== Running career ==
Teferi's training schedule is to wake up at 5:30 am, do a morning workout, rest, take an afternoon nap, and then do another workout in the evening. He runs 200 kilometers (124 miles) a week, over 30 kilometers (19 miles) per day.

=== 2015–19; 2016 Olympics, Israeli records ===
Teferi is an Israeli half marathon champion, having won the title in December 2015, ahead of Berihun We've and Israeli Olympian Ageze Guadie.

Due to his 2:18.19 finish in the Rotterdam Marathon in April 2016, in which he came in 23rd, Teferi qualified for the 2016 Olympics.

Teferi competed for Israel at the 2016 Summer Olympics in the marathon, and finished 74th out of 155 runners, with a time of 2:21:06.

In January 2018, Teferi finished in second place (2:18.35) at the Tiberias Marathon. On 12 August 2018, he ran a 2:13:00 and broke the Israeli marathon record (set in 2003 by Ayele Seteng), while coming in seventh in the 2018 European Athletics Championships in Berlin, Germany.

In February 2019 he ran the Seville Marathon in 2:10:11 in Seville, Spain, coming in eighth. In April 2019 Teferi set a new Israeli half-marathon record at 1:02:05, winning a race in Berlin.

On 20 July 2019, Teferi won the KBC Night of Athletics 5000 Metres in Heusden-Zolder, Belgium, with a time of 13:40.37.

On 27 October 2019, Teferi ran the Frankfurt Marathon in 2:08:09 in Frankfurt, Germany, setting a new Israeli record and finishing in 5th place.

On 5 December 2019, he won the Israeli Half Marathon Championship with a time of 1:03:19.

=== 2020–21; 2020 Olympics ===
On 3 January 2020, Teferi won the 2020 Tiberias Half Marathon with a time of 1:01:23.

On 5 December 2020, at the Israeli Half Marathon Championships, Teferi won a silver medal with a time of 1:02:58.

Teferi represented Israel at the 2020 Olympics on 8 August 2021, in the marathon. He finished 13th out of 106 runners, the best-ever finish for an Israeli marathoner at the Olympics, with a time of 2:13:02.

On 14 March 2021, Teferi won the Agmon Hahula Marathon in Israel, with a time of 2:07:44.

On 10 December 2021, he won the Tiberias Half Marathon, with a time of 1:02:17.

=== 2022–23; World and European Championships silver medals, Fukuoka International Marathon gold medal ===
On 25 March 2022, at the Jerusalem Half Marathon, Teferi won the silver medal with a time of 1:10:28.

On 15 August 2022, at the 2022 European Athletics Championships in Munich, Teferi won the silver medal for Israel in the individual marathon competition in 2:10:23. He was also a member of the gold medal team for Israel winning the European Marathon Cup at the same competition.

On 4 December 2022, Teferi won the Fukuoka International Marathon in Japan, with a time of 2:06:43. It was a new Israeli record.

On 27 August 2023, at the 2023 World Athletics Championships in Budapest, Teferi won the silver medal in the Men's Marathon with a time of 2:09:12. He was the fourth Israeli to win a medal at the World Athletics Championship, and the first Israeli distance-runner to do so. He said: "I’m so excited and happy to represent my country on such a big stage and bring honor to myself, my country, and my family."

On 5 November 2023, Teferi placed sixth at the 2023 New York City Marathon in 2:10:28. He said: "I run for the [Israeli] flag... It's a responsibility for me."

=== 2024; Paris Olympics, Israeli National Record ===
In June 2024, Teferi (fourth place; 1:01:07—seven seconds behind the winner), Gashau Ayale (seventh place), and Girmaw Amare (ninth place) secured Team Israel's second-place finish in the team half marathon event in the 2024 European Athletics Championships in Rome, Italy. A half marathon was run rather than a full marathon because of the proximity of the race to the Paris Olympics marathon.

Teferi represented Israel at the 2024 Paris Olympics in the Men's marathon. He ran it in a time of 2:10:42 (as Tamirat Tola of Ethiopia won in a time of 2:06:26, and bronze medalist Benson Kipruto was three minutes and 42 seconds faster than Teferi, at 2:07:00), and came in 26th.

Teferi would also go on to break the Israeli national record in the marathon at the 2024 Valencia Marathon, running 2:04:44.

== Personal bests ==
- 3000 metres – 8:04.31 (Tel Aviv 2020)
- 5000 metres – 13:40.37 (Heusden-Zolder 2019)
- 10,000 metres – 28:34.27 (Tel Aviv 2020)

Road

- 5 kilometres – 13:52 (Tel Aviv 2021)
- 10 kilometres – 28:18 (Tel Aviv 2020) NR
- Half marathon – 1:00:52 (Tallinn 2019) NR
- Marathon – 2:04:44 (Valencia 2024)

== See also ==
- List of Israeli records in athletics
- List of select Jewish track and field athletes
- Sports in Israel
