= 2019 European Athletics Team Championships Super League =

Athletics team competitions

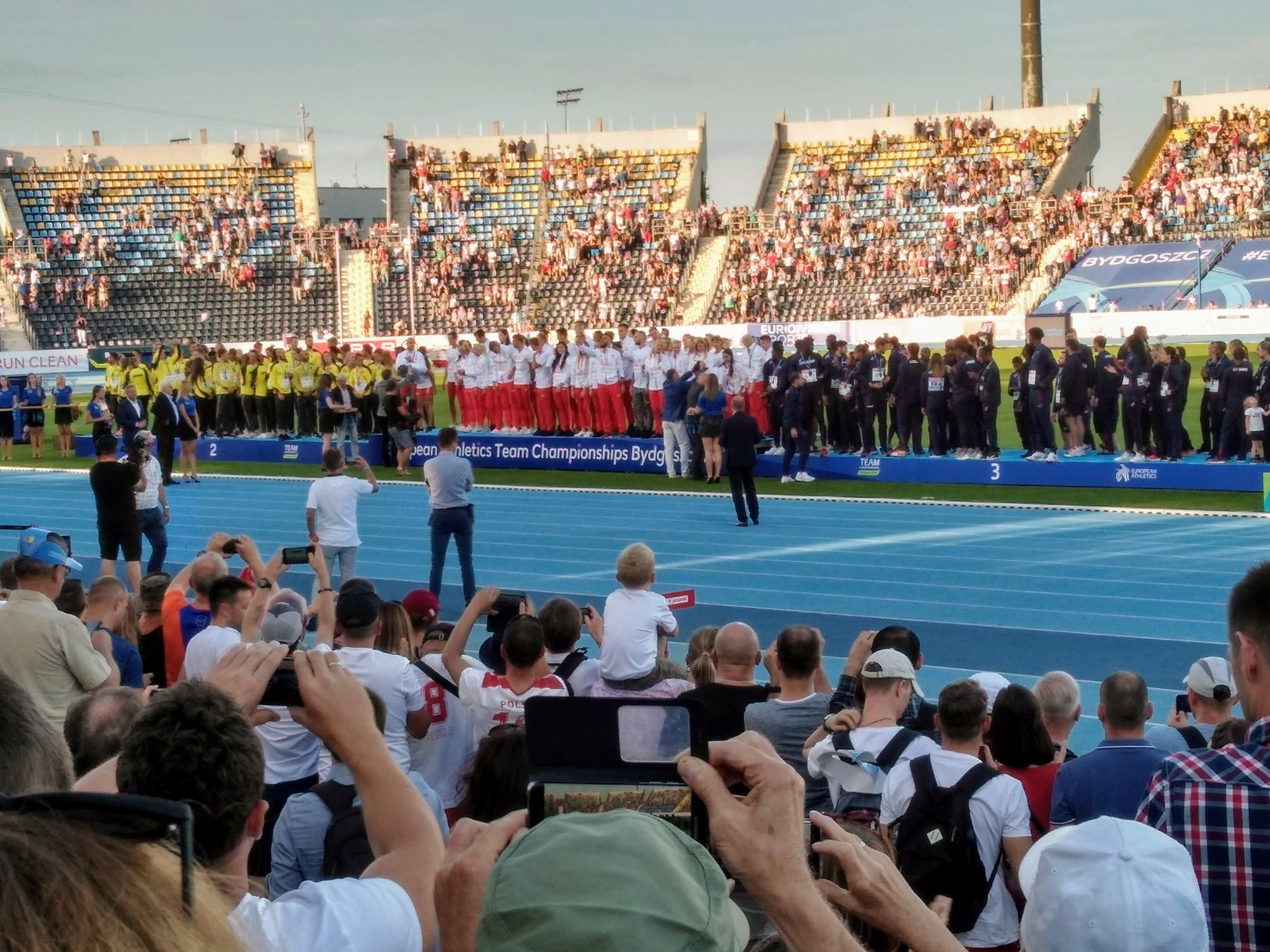
ETCh 2019 podium

These are the complete results of the 2019 European Team Championships Super League held on 9–11 August 2019 in Bydgoszcz, Poland. As with the previous championships there were a couple of rules applying specifically to this competition, such as the limit of three attempts in the throwing events, long jump and triple jump (only the top four were allowed the fourth attempt) and the limit of four misses total in the high jump and pole vault (except when the winner has already been established).

== Background ==
- Finland, Sweden, and Switzerland were promoted from 2017 First League.
- Due to planned reduction of the Super League from 12 to 8 teams from 2021, 5 teams were to be relegated to the European Athletics Team Championships First League and only one promoted from it (and initially Belarus as scheduled host of 2021 Minsk Super League).

== Men's results ==
=== 100 metres ===
Heats – 9 August
Wind:
Heat 1: +0.5 m/s, Heat 2: +1.6 m/s

Rank	Heat	Name	Nationality	Time	Notes	Points
1	1	Jimmy Vicaut	France	10.07	Q	
2	2	Marcell Jacobs	Italy	10.09	Q	
3	2	Michael Pohl	Germany	10.24	Q	
4	2	Harry Aikines-Aryeetey	Great Britain	10.29	Q	
5	2	Remigiusz Olszewski	Poland	10.37	q	
6	1	Oleksandr Sokolov	Ukraine	10.37	Q, SB	
7	1	Ángel David Rodríguez	Spain	10.48	Q, SB	
8	1	Jan Veleba	Czech Republic	10.51	q	
9	1	Henrik Larsson	Sweden	10.56		4
10	2	Sylvain Chuard	Switzerland	10.62		3
11	1	Konstadinos Zikos	Greece	10.82		2
12	2	Samuel Purola	Finland	13.59		1

Final – 10 August
Wind:
-1.4 m/s

Rank	Lane	Name	Nationality	Time	Notes	Points
1	5	Jimmy Vicaut	France	10.35		12
2	4	Marcell Jacobs	Italy	10.39		11
3	6	Michael Pohl	Germany	10.55		10
4	9	Harry Aikines-Aryeetey	Great Britain	10.57		9
5	7	Oleksandr Sokolov	Ukraine	10.57		8
6	3	Jan Veleba	Czech Republic	10.57		7
7	8	Ángel David Rodríguez	Spain	10.83		6
	2	Remigiusz Olszewski	Poland	DQ	R162.8	5

=== 200 metres ===
Heats – 9 August
Wind:
Heat 1: +0.2 m/s, Heat 2: +0.7 m/s

Rank	Heat	Name	Nationality	Time	Notes	Points
1	1	Richard Kilty	Great Britain	20.72	Q	
2	1	Mouhamadou Fall	France	20.82	Q	
3	2	Eseosa Desalu	Italy	20.86	Q	
4	1	Serhiy Smelyk	Ukraine	20.88	Q	
5	2	Pavel Maslák	Czech Republic	20.89	Q	
6	2	Steven Müller	Germany	20.89	Q	
7	2	Samuel García	Spain	20.97	q	
8	1	Kasper Kadestål	Sweden	21.07	q, PB	
9	2	Panayiotis Trivizas	Greece	21.20		4
10	1	William Reais	Switzerland	21.32		3
11	2	Oskari Lehtonen	Finland	21.43		2
12	1	Przemysław Słowikowski	Poland	21.47		1

Final – 11 August
Wind:
-1.0 m/s

Rank	Lane	Name	Nationality	Time	Notes	Points
1	4	Richard Kilty	Great Britain	20.66		12
2	7	Eseosa Desalu	Italy	20.69		11
3	5	Mouhamadou Fall	France	20.70		10
4	9	Serhiy Smelyk	Ukraine	20.70		9
5	6	Pavel Maslák	Czech Republic	20.76		8
6	8	Steven Müller	Germany	20.76		7
7	2	Samuel García	Spain	21.08		6
8	3	Kasper Kadestål	Sweden	21.20		5

=== 400 metres ===
Heats – 9 August

Rank	Heat	Name	Nationality	Time	Notes	Points
1	1	Davide Re	Italy	45.86	Q	
2	1	Fabrisio Saïdy	France	46.17	Q	
3	1	Rafał Omelko	Poland	46.58	Q	
4	2	Óscar Husillos	Spain	46.66	Q	
5	2	Dwayne Cowan	Great Britain	46.82	Q	
6	2	Danylo Danylenko	Ukraine	46.96	Q	
7	1	Patrick Schneider	Germany	47.00	q	
8	2	Carl Bengtström	Sweden	47.16	q, PB	
9	2	Patrik Šorm	Czech Republic	47.28		4
10	2	Charles Devantay	Switzerland	47.37		3
11	1	Mihail Pappas	Greece	47.47		2
12	1	Christoffer Envall	Finland	47.68		1

Final – 10 August

Rank	Lane	Name	Nationality	Time	Notes	Points
1	4	Davide Re	Italy	45.35		12
2	5	Dwayne Cowan	Great Britain	46.18		11
3	6	Óscar Husillos	Spain	46.36		10
4	9	Rafał Omelko	Poland	46.40		9
5	7	Fabrisio Saïdy	France	46.75		8
6	8	Danylo Danylenko	Ukraine	46.76		7
7	2	Patrick Schneider	Germany	46.99		6
	3	Carl Bengtström	Sweden	DNS		5

=== 800 metres ===
11 August

Rank	Name	Nationality	Time	Notes	Points
1	Adam Kszczot	Poland	1:46.97		12
2	Jamie Webb	Great Britain	1:47.25		11
3	Álvaro de Arriba	Spain	1:47.48		10
4	Marc Reuther	Germany	1:47.61		9
5	Andreas Kramer	Sweden	1:47.61		8
6	Simone Barontini	Italy	1:47.98		7
7	Gabriel Tual	France	1:48.13		6
8	Lukáš Hodboď	Czech Republic	1:49.00		5
9	Jonas Schöpfer	Switzerland	1:49.04		4
10	Hristos Kotitsas	Greece	1:49.24		3
11	Ville Lampinen	Finland	1:49.45	SB	2
12	Yevhen Hutsol	Ukraine	1:49.67		1

=== 1500 metres ===
10 August

Rank	Name	Nationality	Time	Notes	Points
1	Marcin Lewandowski	Poland	3:47.88		12
2	Charlie Grice	Great Britain	3:48.35		11
3	Jakub Holuša	Czech Republic	3:49.18		10
4	Andreas Almgren	Sweden	3:49.53		9
5	Rabie Doukkana	France	3:49.58		8
6	Amos Bartelsmeyer	Germany	3:49.99		7
7	Matteo Spanu	Italy	3:50.29		6
8	Tom Elmer	Switzerland	3:51.26		5
9	Oleh Kayafa	Ukraine	3:52.04		4
10	Joonas Rinne	Finland	3:52.56		3
11	Andreas Dimitrakis	Greece	3:54.36		2
	Kevin López	Spain	DQ	R163.3(b)	0

=== 3000 metres ===
11 August

Rank	Name	Nationality	Time	Notes	Points
1	Adel Mechaal	Spain	8:02.51		12
2	Kalle Berglund	Sweden	8:02.79	PB	11
3	James West	Great Britain	8:02.97		10
4	Yemaneberhan Crippa	Italy	8:03.69		9
5	Richard Ringer	Germany	8:04.74		8
6	Jonas Raess	Switzerland	8:04.93		7
7	Jan Friš	Czech Republic	8:08.03		6
8	Stanislav Maslov	Ukraine	8:08.72	SB	5
9	Jimmy Gressier	France	8:15.49		4
10	Patryk Kozłowski	Poland	8:24.05		3
11	Marios Anagnostou	Greece	8:27.85	PB	2
12	Hannu Granberg	Finland	8:33.76		1

=== 5000 metres ===
10 August

Rank	Name	Nationality	Time	Notes	Points
1	Yemaneberhan Crippa	Italy	13:43.30		12
2	Julien Wanders	Switzerland	13:45.31		11
3	Hugo Hay	France	13:58.20		10
4	Sergio Jiménez	Spain	14:00.88		9
5	Suldan Hassan	Sweden	14:04.04		8
6	Jakub Zemaník	Czech Republic	14:12.93		7
7	Markos Gourlias	Greece	14:15.45		6
8	Nick Goolab	Great Britain	14:27.43		5
9	Robert Głowala	Poland	14:36.42		4
10	Volodymyr Kyts	Ukraine	14:40.90		3
11	Eero Saleva	Finland	14:51.76		2
	Amanal Petros	Germany	DQ	R163.3(b)	0

=== 110 metres hurdles ===
Heats – 9 August
Wind:
Heat 1: +0.6 m/s, Heat 2: +0.6 m/s

Rank	Heat	Name	Nationality	Time	Notes	Points
1	2	Orlando Ortega	Spain	13.39	Q	
2	1	Pascal Martinot-Lagarde	France	13.39	Q	
3	1	Konstadinos Douvalidis	Greece	13.47	Q	
4	1	Gregor Traber	Germany	13.55	Q	
5	1	Elmo Lakka	Finland	13.61	q	
6	2	Cameron Fillery	Great Britain	13.64	Q	
7	2	Damian Czykier	Poland	13.66	Q	
8	2	Hassane Fofana	Italy	13.69	q	
9	1	Jonatan Holm	Sweden	13.82		4
10	2	Jason Joseph	Switzerland	14.03		3
11	1	Kyrylo Khomenko	Ukraine	14.10		2
12	2	Jiří Sýkora	Czech Republic	14.16		1

Final – 11 August
Wind:
-1.8 m/s

Rank	Lane	Name	Nationality	Time	Notes	Points
1	6	Orlando Ortega	Spain	13.38		12
2	7	Pascal Martinot-Lagarde	France	13.46		11
3	9	Gregor Traber	Germany	13.54		10
4	8	Damian Czykier	Poland	13.70		9
5	5	Konstadinos Douvalidis	Greece	13.71		8
6	3	Hassane Fofana	Italy	13.78		7
7	4	Cameron Fillery	Great Britain	13.83		6
8	2	Elmo Lakka	Finland	13.89		5

=== 400 metres hurdles ===
Heats – 9 August

Rank	Heat	Name	Nationality	Time	Notes	Points
1	2	Patryk Dobek	Poland	48.80	Q, SB	
2	2	Vít Müller	Czech Republic	49.62	Q	
3	1	Ludvy Vaillant	France	49.88	Q	
4	2	Luke Campbell	Germany	49.94	Q	
5	2	Oskari Mörö	Finland	49.97	q, SB	
6	1	Sergio Fernández	Spain	50.10	Q	
7	1	Chris McAlister	Great Britain	50.32	Q	
8	1	Dany Brand	Switzerland	50.41	q	
9	2	Konstadinos Nakos	Greece	50.67	PB	4
10	1	Alessandro Sibilio	Italy	50.76		3
11	2	Hampus Widlund	Sweden	51.16		2
12	1	Denys Nechyporenko	Ukraine	51.58		1

Final – 10 August

Rank	Lane	Name	Nationality	Time	Notes	Points
1	7	Patryk Dobek	Poland	48.87		12
2	6	Ludvy Vaillant	France	48.98	SB	11
3	9	Luke Campbell	Germany	49.24	SB	10
4	8	Chris McAlister	Great Britain	49.28	PB	9
5	5	Vít Müller	Czech Republic	49.36	PB	8
6	4	Sergio Fernández	Spain	49.57	SB	7
7	3	Oskari Mörö	Finland	50.22		6
8	2	Dany Brand	Switzerland	50.95		5

=== 3000 metres steeplechase ===
11 August

Rank	Name	Nationality	Time	Notes	Points
1	Fernando Carro	Spain	8:27.26		12
2	Topi Raitanen	Finland	8:27.68		11
3	Krystian Zalewski	Poland	8:29.12	SB	10
4	Zak Seddon	Great Britain	8:30.89		9
5	Ahmed Abdelwahed	Italy	8:34.30		8
6	Martin Grau	Germany	8:37.36		7
7	Yoann Kowal	France	8:40.60		6
8	Vasyl Koval	Ukraine	8:54.48		5
9	Jáchym Kovár	Czech Republic	9:04.24		4
10	Nikolaos Sakis	Greece	9:10.85		3
11	Christoph Graf	Switzerland	9:15.66		2
	Napoleon Solomon	Sweden	DNF		0

=== 4 × 100 metres relay ===
10 August

Rank	Heat	Nation	Athletes	Time	Notes	Points
1	A	Great Britain	Dominic Ashwell, Oliver Bromby, Richard Kilty, Harry Aikines-Aryeetey	38.73		12
2	A	Germany	Steven Müller, Marvin Schulte, Roy Schmidt, Michael Pohl	38.88		11
3	B	Ukraine	Erik Kostrytsya, Oleksandr Sokolov, Igor Bodrov, Serhiy Smelyk	39.02		10
4	A	Poland	Karol Kwiatkowski, Dominik Kopeć, Przemysław Słowikowski, Eryk Hampel	39.20	SB	9
5	A	Spain	Ángel David Rodríguez, Pol Retamal, Daniel Rodríguez, Mauro Triana	39.25	SB	8
6	A	Italy	Eseosa Desalu, Federico Cattaneo, Davide Manenti, Antonio Infantino	39.27	SB	7
7	B	Greece	Konstadinos Zikos, Konstadinos Douvalidis, Panayiotis Trivizas, Sotirios Garagganis	39.36	SB	6
8	B	Switzerland	Suganthan Somasundaram, William Reais, Sylvain Chuard, Ricky Petrucciani	39.88		5
9	B	Sweden	Joel Groth, Emmanuel Dawlson, Marcus Torneé, Henrik Larsson	40.01		4
10	B	Finland	Konsta Alatupa, Roope Saarinen, Oskari Lehtonen, Elmo Lakka	40.12		3
	A	France	Mouhamadou Fall, Jimmy Vicaut, Mickaël-Meba Zézé, Christophe Lemaitre	DQ	R163.3(a)	0
	B	Czech Republic	Pavel Maslák, Jan Veleba, Jan Jirka, Dominik Záleský	DQ	R170.7	0

=== 4 × 400 metres relay ===
11 August

Rank	Heat	Nation	Athletes	Time	Notes	Points
1	A	Italy	Edoardo Scotti, Matteo Galvan, Brayan Lopez, Davide Re	3:02.04	EL	12
2	A	France	Mamadou Kasse Hann, Christopher Naliali, Thomas Jordier, Loïc Prévot	3:02.08	SB	11
3	A	Poland	Wiktor Suwara, Rafał Omelko, Łukasz Krawczuk, Patryk Dobek	3:02.56	SB	10
4	A	Spain	Óscar Husillos, Darwin Echeverry, Bernat Erta, Samuel García	3:04.52	SB	9
5	B	Czech Republic	Jan Tesař, Michal Desenský, Patrik Šorm, Vít Müller	3:05.96		8
6	B	Ukraine	Danylo Danylenko, Oleh Myronets, Dmytro Bikulov, Oleksiy Pozdnyakov	3:06.04	SB	7
7	B	Switzerland	Luca Flück, Ricky Petrucciani, Vincent Notz, Charles Devantay	3:07.82	SB	6
8	B	Greece	Ioannis Detsikas, Petros Kiriakidis, Konstadinos Nakos, Mihail Pappas	3:08.17		5
9	B	Finland	Christoffer Envall, Eljas Aalto, Ville Aarnivala, Erik Back	3:10.60	SB	4
10	B	Sweden	Anton Sigurdsson, Nick Ekelund-Arenander, Emmanuel Dawlson, Andreas Almgren	3:12.13	SB	3
11	A	Germany	Tobias Lange, Marvin Schlegel, Johannes Trefz, Manuel Sanders	3:16.59		2
	A	Great Britain	Youcef Zatat, Ethan Brown, Lee Thompson, Martyn Rooney	DNS		0

=== High jump ===
10 August

Rank	Name	Nationality	1.97	2.02	2.07	2.12	2.17	2.22	2.26	2.28	Result	Notes	Points
1	Miguel Ángel Sancho	Spain	–	–	o	o	o	o	o	xxx	2.26	SB	12
2	Chris Baker	Great Britain	–	–	–	o	o	o	xxx		2.22		11
3	Stefano Sottile	Italy	–	–	o	o	xo	o	xxx		2.22		10
4	Mateusz Przybylko	Germany	–	–	xo	o	xo	xo	x		2.22		9
5	Norbert Kobielski	Poland	–	–	o	o	o	xxo	xx		2.22		8
6	William Aubatin	France	–	o	xo	xo	xo	x			2.17		7
7	Yuriy Krymarenko	Ukraine	–	–	xo	o	xxo	x			2.17		6
8	Konstadinos Baniotis	Greece	–	–	o	o	xxx				2.12		5
9	Simon Wiklund	Sweden	o	o	xo	xx–	x				2.07		4
10	Vivien Streit	Switzerland	xxo	o	xo	x					2.07		3
11	Martin Heindl	Czech Republic	–	–	xxo	xx					2.07		2
12	Arttu Mattila	Finland	–	o	xxx						2.02		1

=== Pole vault ===
11 August

Rank	Name	Nationality	5.01	5.16	5.31	5.46	5.56	5.66	5.71	5.81	6.03	Result	Notes	Points
1	Piotr Lisek	Poland	–	–	–	o	–	o	o	xo	xxx	5.81		12
2	Melker Svärd Jacobsson	Sweden	–	–	–	–	o	–	xo	xxx		5.71		11
3	Renaud Lavillenie	France	–	–	–	–	xo	–	xo	xx		5.71		10
4	Konstadinos Filippidis	Greece	–	–	o	o	o	o	xxx			5.66		9
5	Claudio Michel Stecchi	Italy	–	–	o	o	xo	o	xxx			5.66		8
6	Jan Kudlička	Czech Republic	–	–	o	o	o	x–	xx			5.56		7
7	Adrián Valles	Spain	–	xxo	xo	o	x					5.46		6
8	Torben Blech	Germany	–	–	o	xxo	xx					5.46		4.5
8	Tomas Wecksten	Finland	o	o	o	xxo	xx					5.46	SB	4.5
10	Charlie Myers	Great Britain	–	–	xo	xxx						5.31		3
11	Dominik Alberto	Switzerland	o	xxx								5.01		2
	Kyrylo Kiru	Ukraine	xxx									NM		0

=== Long jump ===
10 August

Rank	Name	Nationality	#1	#2	#3	#4	Result	Notes	Points
1	Miltiadis Tentoglou	Greece	7.00w	x	8.30	7.52	8.30		12
2	Eusebio Cáceres	Spain	x	8.02w	x	x	8.02w		11
3	Tomasz Jaszczuk	Poland	7.95	7.96	7.99	8.00	8.00		10
4	Filippo Randazzo	Italy	8.00	x	7.32w	x	8.00	SB	9
5	Yaroslav Isachenkov	Ukraine	7.91	x	7.83w		7.91	PB	8
6	Kristian Pulli	Finland	7.71	7.66	7.91		7.91	SB	7
7	Jacob Fincham-Dukes	Great Britain	7.44	7.64	7.85w		7.85w		6
8	Julian Howard	Germany	7.47	7.79	x		7.79		5
9	Jarod Biya	Switzerland	7.25	7.36	7.78		7.78	=NU20R	4
10	Augustin Bey	France	7.41	7.62	7.77w		7.77w		3
11	Andreas Carlsson	Sweden	7.55w	x	7.52		7.55w		2
12	Jiří Vondráček	Czech Republic	7.30w	7.35	7.41		7.41		1

=== Triple jump ===
11 August

Rank	Name	Nationality	#1	#2	#3	#4	Result	Notes	Points
1	Ben Williams	Great Britain	14.69	16.37	17.14	x	17.14	PB	12
2	Simo Lipsanen	Finland	16.76	x	x	x	16.76		11
3	Benjamin Compaoré	France	x	16.22	16.67w	x	16.67w		10
4	Jesper Hellström	Sweden	x	15.45	16.53	x	16.53	PB	9
5	Adrian Świderski	Poland	16.12	16.27	x		16.27		8
6	Dimitrios Tsiamis	Greece	x	16.12	16.25		16.25		7
7	Felix Wenzel	Germany	16.23w	15.97	x		16.23w		6
8	Fabrizio Schembri	Italy	15.94w	15.59	16.10		16.10		5
9	Sergio Solanas	Spain	15.89	15.82	16.04		16.04		4
10	Oleksandr Malosilov	Ukraine	15.06	15.56	15.12		15.56		3
11	Ondřej Vodák	Czech Republic	15.18w	15.00	15.51w		15.51w		2
12	Carlos Kouassi	Switzerland	13.82	14.31	15.50		15.50		1

=== Shot put ===
10 August

Rank	Name	Nationality	#1	#2	#3	#4	Result	Notes	Points
1	Michał Haratyk	Poland	21.41	21.83	21.31	x	21.83	CR	12
2	Tomáš Staněk	Czech Republic	20.31	20.65	x	x	20.65		11
3	Frédéric Dagée	France	19.88	x	20.03	x	20.03		10
4	Simon Bayer	Germany	19.88	x	20.03	x	20.03		9
5	Scott Lincoln	Great Britain	19.39	19.57	19.07		19.57		8
6	Leonardo Fabbri	Italy	19.53	x	19.34		19.53		7
7	Ihor Musiyenko	Ukraine	18.92	19.24	19.51		19.51		6
8	Wictor Petersson	Sweden	19.45	x	19.30		19.45		5
9	Carlos Tobalina	Spain	18.86	19.22	19.28		19.28		4
10	Nikolaos Skarvelis	Greece	18.87	19.07	19.17		19.17		3
11	Arttu Kangas	Finland	17.47	x	17.37		17.47		2
12	Stefan Wieland	Switzerland	16.55	x	x		16.55		1

=== Discus throw ===
11 August

Rank	Name	Nationality	#1	#2	#3	#4	Result	Notes	Points
1	Piotr Małachowski	Poland	61.21	60.62	60.28	63.02	63.02		12
2	Martin Wierig	Germany	61.04	60.14	59.86	61.84	61.84		11
3	Daniel Ståhl	Sweden	x	61.38	x	x	61.38		10
4	Giovanni Faloci	Italy	57.71	59.11	60.25	60.17	60.25		9
5	Lois Maikel Martínez	Spain	57.76	59.20	57.56		59.20		8
6	Mykyta Nesterenko	Ukraine	55.48	56.20	58.53		58.53		7
7	Marek Bárta	Czech Republic	56.42	56.73	57.66		57.66		6
8	Lolassonn Djouhan	France	57.39	x	x		57.39		5
9	Yeoryios Tremos	Greece	54.20	56.81	54.90		56.81		4
10	Gregory Thompson	Great Britain	55.71	x	x		55.71		3
11	Oskari Perälampi	Finland	49.07	x	53.10		53.10		2
12	Lukas Jost	Switzerland	46.35	47.60	48.73		48.73		1

=== Hammer throw ===
10 August

Rank	Name	Nationality	#1	#2	#3	#4	Result	Notes	Points
1	Wojciech Nowicki	Poland	76.33	78.84	x	x	78.84		12
2	Quentin Bigot	France	75.16	75.43	76.70	76.22	76.70		11
3	Mihail Anastasakis	Greece	74.43	75.77	x	x	75.77		10
4	Javier Cienfuegos	Spain	74.83	74.07	75.23	x	75.23		9
5	Aaron Kangas	Finland	69.25	71.98	73.62		73.62		8
6	Serhiy Perevoznikov	Ukraine	72.15	71.96	70.27		72.15		7
7	Tristan Schwandke	Germany	67.47	71.27	70.88		71.27		6
8	Marco Lingua	Italy	70.38	70.76	70.57		70.76		5
9	Mattias Lindberg	Sweden	70.38	70.76	70.57		70.76		4
10	Nick Miller	Great Britain	x	66.20	x		66.20		3
11	Patrik Hájek	Czech Republic	63.10	x	x		63.10		2
12	Martin Bingisser	Switzerland	56.93	57.75	x		57.75		1

=== Javelin throw ===
9 August

Rank	Name	Nationality	#1	#2	#3	#4	Result	Notes	Points
1	Julian Weber	Germany	86.86	83.75	81.64	83.87	86.86	SB	12
2	Jakub Vadlejch	Czech Republic	79.88	79.07	x	x	79.88		11
3	Marcin Krukowski	Poland	x	77.15	79.54	78.90	79.54		10
4	Manu Quijera	Spain	75.64	73.14	x	74.73	75.64		9
5	Toni Kuusela	Finland	x	75.35	x		75.35		8
6	Mauro Fraresso	Italy	74.48	71.82	x		74.48		7
7	Simon Wieland	Switzerland	72.10	71.41	73.78		73.78		6
8	Kim Amb	Sweden	x	73.23	x		73.23		5
9	Oleksandr Nychyporchuk	Ukraine	72.43	x	x		72.43		4
10	Lukas Moutarde	France	68.43	71.21	69.11		71.21		3
11	Dimitrios Tsitsos	Greece	67.70	69.00	67.02		69.00		2
12	Tom Hewson	Great Britain	64.39	63.05	64.93		64.93		1

== Women's results ==
=== 100 metres ===
Heats – 9 August
Wind:
Heat 1: +0.9 m/s, Heat 2: +0.6 m/s

Rank	Heat	Name	Nationality	Time	Notes	Points
1	1	Daryll Neita	Great Britain	11.19	Q, SB	
2	2	Carolle Zahi	France	11.20	Q, SB	
3	1	Ewa Swoboda	Poland	11.23	Q	
4	2	Rafailia Spanoudaki-Hatziriga	Greece	11.40	Q, SB	
5	2	Jaël Bestue	Spain	11.43	Q, =NU20R	
6	2	Lisa Marie Kwayie	Germany	11.45	q	
7	1	Klára Seidlová	Czech Republic	11.436	Q	
8	1	Zaynab Dosso	Italy	11.49	q	
9	1	Hanna-Maari Latvala	Finland	11.55		4
10	1	Viktoriya Ratnikova	Ukraine	11.64		3
11	2	Daniella Busk	Sweden	11.67	SB	2
12	2	Salomé Kora	Switzerland	11.68		1

Final – 10 August
Wind:
-2.5 m/s

Rank	Lane	Name	Nationality	Time	Notes	Points
1	6	Carolle Zahi	France	11.31		12
2	7	Daryll Neita	Great Britain	11.33		11
3	5	Ewa Swoboda	Poland	11.35		10
4	9	Jael Bestue	Spain	11.61		9
5	2	Zaynab Dosso	Italy	11.70		8
6	8	Klára Seidlová	Czech Republic	11.77		7
7	4	Rafailia Spanoudaki-Hatziriga	Greece	11.84		6
	3	Lisa Marie Kwayie	Germany	DNS		5

=== 200 metres ===
Heats – 9 August
Wind:
Heat 1: +0.6 m/s, Heat 2: -0.9 m/s

Rank	Heat	Name	Nationality	Time	Notes	Points
1	2	Jodie Williams	Great Britain	22.97	Q	
2	1	Mujinga Kambundji	Switzerland	23.04	Q	
3	1	Jessica-Bianca Wessolly	Germany	23.28	Q	
4	2	Rafailia Spanoudaki-Hatziriga	Greece	23.29	Q	
5	2	Anna Kiełbasińska	Poland	23.51	Q	
6	1	Gloria Hooper	Italy	23.57	Q	
7	1	Paula Sevilla	Spain	23.57	q	
8	1	Hanna-Maari Latvala	Finland	23.58	q, SB	
8	2	Maroussia Paré	France	23.58	q	
10	1	Yelizaveta Bryzgina	Ukraine	23.90		3
11	2	Lisa Lilja	Sweden	23.91		2
12	2	Marcela Pírková	Czech Republic	24.00		1

Final – 11 August
Wind:
-1.0 m/s

Rank	Lane	Name	Nationality	Time	Notes	Points
1	5	Mujinga Kambundji	Switzerland	22.72	SB	12
2	6	Jodie Williams	Great Britain	22.89		11
3	4	Jessica-Bianca Wessolly	Germany	23.15		10
4	1	Maroussia Paré	France	23.25		9
5	3	Rafailia Spanoudaki-Hatziriga	Greece	23.27		8
6	7	Anna Kiełbasińska	Poland	23.36		7
7	8	Gloria Hooper	Italy	23.46	SB	6
8	9	Paula Sevilla	Spain	23.58		5
9	9	Hanna-Maari Latvala	Finland	24.05		4

=== 400 metres ===
Heats – 9 August

Rank	Heat	Name	Nationality	Time	Notes	Points
1	1	Justyna Święty-Ersetic	Poland	52.32	Q	
2	2	Léa Sprunger	Switzerland	52.57	Q	
3	2	Déborah Sananes	France	52.64	Q	
4	2	Kateryna Klymyuk	Ukraine	52.66	Q	
5	1	Maria Benedicta Chigbolu	Italy	53.23	Q	
6	1	Lada Vondrová	Czech Republic	53.31	Q	
7	2	Amy Allcock	Great Britain	53.47	q	
8	2	Moa Hjelmer	Sweden	53.55	q, SB	
9	1	Ruth Sophia Spelmeyer	Germany	53.65		4
10	2	Despina Mourta	Greece	53.99		3
11	1	Aauri Lorena Bokesa	Spain	54.11		2
12	1	Amira Chokairy	Finland	55.67		1

Final – 10 August

Rank	Lane	Name	Nationality	Time	Notes	Points
1	5	Justyna Święty-Ersetic	Poland	51.23		12
2	6	Léa Sprunger	Switzerland	51.84		11
3	7	Maria Benedicta Chigbolu	Italy	52.19		10
4	4	Déborah Sananes	France	52.30		9
5	8	Lada Vondrová	Czech Republic	52.38		8
6	2	Amy Allcock	Great Britain	52.92		7
7	9	Kateryna Klymyuk	Ukraine	53.09		6
8	3	Moa Hjelmer	Sweden	53.10	SB	5

=== 800 metres ===
10 August

Rank	Name	Nationality	Time	Notes	Points
1	Rénelle Lamote	France	2:01.21	SB	12
2	Shelayna Oskan-Clarke	Great Britain	2:01.45		11
3	Christina Hering	Germany	2:01.77		10
4	Sara Kuivisto	Finland	2:01.85	PB	9
5	Nataliya Pryshchepa	Ukraine	2:02.01		8
6	Anna Sabat	Poland	2:02.36	SB	7
7	Esther Guerrero	Spain	2:02.47		6
8	Diana Mezuliáníková	Czech Republic	2:02.60		5
9	Delia Sclabas	Switzerland	2:02.60	EU20L	4
10	Lovisa Lindh	Sweden	2:03.32		3
11	Eloisa Coiro	Italy	2:03.95	PB	2
12	Konstadina Yiannopoulou	Greece	2:09.12		1

=== 1500 metres ===
11 August

Rank	Name	Nationality	Time	Notes	Points
1	Sofia Ennaoui	Poland	4:08.37		12
2	Caterina Granz	Germany	4:08.52		11
3	Kristiina Mäki	Czech Republic	4:09.12	SB	10
4	Sara Kuivisto	Finland	4:09.25	SB	9
5	Marta Pérez	Spain	4:09.53		8
6	Jessica Judd	Great Britain	4:09.89		7
7	Hanna Hermansson	Sweden	4:10.59		6
8	Nataliya Pryshchepa	Ukraine	4:10.64	SB	5
9	Marta Zenoni	Italy	4:11.32		4
10	Elodie Normand	France	4:12.67		3
11	Delia Sclabas	Switzerland	4:13.88		2
12	Konstadina Yiannopoulou	Greece	4:35.64		1

=== 3000 metres ===
10 August

Rank	Name	Nationality	Time	Notes	Points
1	Yolanda Ngarambe	Sweden	9:07.67		12
2	Marta Zenoni	Italy	9:08.34		11
3	Solange Pereira	Spain	9:09.76	PB	10
4	Renata Pliś	Poland	9:13.35		9
5	Denise Krebs	Germany	9:19.13		8
6	Nicole Egger	Switzerland	9:19.57	PB	7
7	Nathalie Blomqvist	Finland	9:19.65	PB	6
8	Johanna Geyer-Carles	France	9:19.73	PB	5
9	Emily Hosker Thornhill	Great Britain	9:19.99		4
10	Anastasia-Panayiota Marinakou	Greece	9:22.15	SB	3
11	Aneta Chlebiková	Czech Republic	9:30.27	PB	2
12	Viktoriia Shkurko	Ukraine	9:39.43		1

=== 5000 metres ===
11 August

Rank	Name	Nationality	Time	Notes	Points
1	Hanna Klein	Germany	15:39.00		12
2	Maitane Melero	Spain	15:44.55		11
3	Sarah Inglis	Great Britain	15:45.23		10
4	Liv Westphal	France	15:45.23	SB	9
5	Francesca Tommasi	Italy	15:49.79		8
6	Sara Christiansson	Sweden	16:06.05		7
7	Chiara Scherrer	Switzerland	16:23.58		6
8	Moira Stewartová	Czech Republic	16:28.41		5
9	Paulina Kaczyńska	Poland	16:40.04		4
10	Janica Rauma	Finland	16:47.18		3
11	Viktoriia Shkurko	Ukraine	17:16.93		2
	Tori Tsolis	Greece	DNF		0

=== 100 metres hurdles ===
Heats – 9 August
Wind:
Heat 1: +0.4 m/s, Heat 2: +0.3 m/s

Rank	Heat	Name	Nationality	Time	Notes	Points
1	2	Luminosa Bogliolo	Italy	12.83	Q	
2	2	Karolina Kołeczek	Poland	12.85	Q	
3	1	Cindy Roleder	Germany	13.04	Q	
4	1	Annimari Korte	Finland	13.11	Q	
5	2	Cindy Ofili	Great Britain	13.16	Q	
6	1	Elisavet Pesiridou	Greece	13.20	Q	
7	2	Hanna Plotitsyna	Ukraine	13.20	q	
8	2	Caridad Jerez	Spain	13.53	q	
9	1	Fanny Quenot	France	13.62		
10	2	Lucie Koudelová	Czech Republic	13.62		
11	1	Noemi Zbären	Switzerland	13.66		
12	1	Malin Skogström	Sweden	13.93		

Final – 11 August
Wind:
-1.2 m/s

Rank	Lane	Name	Nationality	Time	Notes	Points
1	5	Luminosa Bogliolo	Italy	12.87		12
2	6	Cindy Roleder	Germany	12.87	SB	11
3	7	Karolina Kołeczek	Poland	12.88		10
4	8	Cindy Ofili	Great Britain	13.12		9
5	4	Annimari Korte	Finland	13.20		8
6	3	Hanna Plotitsyna	Ukraine	13.26		7
7	9	Elisavet Pesiridou	Greece	13.27		6
8	2	Caridad Jerez	Spain	13.59		5

=== 400 metres hurdles ===
Heats – 9 August

Rank	Heat	Name	Nationality	Time	Notes	Points
1	1	Zuzana Hejnová	Czech Republic	55.80	Q	
2	1	Joanna Linkiewicz	Poland	55.94	Q	
3	2	Anna Ryzhykova	Ukraine	56.28	Q	
4	1	Meghan Beesley	Great Britain	56.35	Q	
5	2	Ayomide Folorunso	Italy	56.49	Q	
6	2	Yasmin Giger	Switzerland	56.90	Q	
7	1	Aurélie Chaboudez	France	57.66	q	
8	1	Hanna Palmqvist	Sweden	58.38	q	
9	2	Jackie Baumann	Germany	58.53		4
10	2	Salma Paralluelo	Spain	58.64		3
11	2	Viivi Lehikoinen	Finland	59.35		2
12	1	Anna Kiafa	Greece	59.61		1

Final – 10 August

Rank	Lane	Name	Nationality	Time	Notes	Points
1	6	Zuzana Hejnová	Czech Republic	55.10		12
2	4	Anna Ryzhykova	Ukraine	55.61		11
3	7	Joanna Linkiewicz	Poland	55.67		10
4	5	Ayomide Folorunso	Italy	56.34		9
5	8	Yasmin Giger	Switzerland	56.34	SB	8
6	9	Meghan Beesley	Great Britain	56.46		7
7	3	Aurélie Chaboudez	France	57.98		6
8	2	Hanna Palmqvist	Sweden	59.05		5

=== 3000 metres steeplechase ===
10 August

Rank	Name	Nationality	Time	Notes	Points
1	Gesa-Felicitas Krause	Germany	9:36.67		12
2	Irene Sánchez-Escribano	Spain	9:39.24		11
3	Rosie Clarke	Great Britain	9:39.85		10
4	Camilla Richardsson	Finland	9:42.97		9
5	Alicja Konieczek	Poland	9:53.30		8
6	Ophélie Claude-Boxberger	France	9:54.66		7
7	Chiara Scherrer	Switzerland	9:58.21		6
8	Lucie Sekanová	Czech Republic	10:00.70		5
9	Isabel Mattuzzi	Italy	10:03.75	SB	4
10	Linn Söderholm	Sweden	10:22.58		3
11	Isavella Kotsahili	Greece	10:22.66	PB	2
12	Hanna Zhmurko	Ukraine	10:44.81		1

=== 4 × 100 metres relay ===
10 August

Rank	Heat	Nation	Athletes	Time	Notes	Points
1	A	France	Carolle Zahi, Orlann Ombissa-Dzangue, Estelle Raffai, Sarah Richard	43.09		12
2	B	Switzerland	Ajla Del Ponte, Sarah Atcho, Mujinga Kambundji, Cornelia Halbheer	43.11		11
3	A	Great Britain	Kristal Awuah, Alisha Rees, Bianca Williams, Rachel Miller	43.46		10
4	A	Germany	Jennifer Montag, Lisa Nippgen, Jessica-Bianca Wessolly, Laura Müller	43.76		9
5	A	Spain	María Isabel Pérez, Cristina Lara, Paula Sevilla, Jael Bestue	43.94	SB	8
6	A	Italy	Zaynab Dosso, Gloria Hooper, Anna Bongiorni, Johanelis Herrera Abreu	44.20		7
7	A	Poland	Kamila Ciba, Katarzyna Sokólska, Magdalena Stefanowicz, Ewa Swoboda	44.23		6
8	B	Czech Republic	Klára Seidlová, Marcela Pírková, Lucie Domská, Nikola Bendová	44.30	SB	5
9	B	Ukraine	Viktoriya Ratnikova, Hanna Plotitsyna, Yana Kachur, Hanna Chubkovtsova	44.34	SB	4
10	B	Finland	Johanna Kylmänen, Lotta Kemppinen, Anniina Kortetmaa, Hanna-Maari Latvala	44.38	SB	3
11	B	Greece	Maria Gatou, Elisavet Pesiridou, Kiriaki Samani, Rafailia Spanoudaki-Hatziriga	44.40	SB	2
12	B	Sweden	Lisa Lilja, Linnea Killander, Daniella Busk, Marie Kimumba	44.51	SB	1

=== 4 × 400 metres relay ===
11 August

Rank	Heat	Nation	Athletes	Time	Notes	Points
1	A	Poland	Iga Baumgart-Witan, Anna Kiełbasińska, Małgorzata Hołub-Kowalik, Justyna Święty-Ersetic	3:24.81	EL	12
2	A	Great Britain	Emily Diamond, Jodie Williams, Zoey Clark, Jessica Turner	3:27.12	SB	11
3	A	Italy	Maria Benedicta Chigbolu, Ayomide Folorunso, Rebecca Borga, Giancarla Trevisan	3:27.32	SB	10
4	B	Ukraine	Anastasiya Bryzhina, Tetyana Melnyk, Kateryna Klymyuk, Anna Ryzhykova	3:29.33	SB	9
5	A	Germany	Luna Bulmahn, Nelly Schmidt, Nadine Gonska, Karolina Pahlitzsch	3:31.18		8
6	A	France	Estelle Perrossier, Amandine Brossier, Agnès Raharolahy, Diana Iscaye	3:31.73		7
7	A	Spain	Andrea Jiménez, Aauri Lorena Bokesa, Carmen Sánchez, Salma Paralluelo	3:32.72	SB	6
8	B	Greece	Korina Politi, Despina Mourta, Elpida-Ioanna Karkalatou, Irini Vasiliou	3:33.01		5
9	B	Czech Republic	Martina Hofmanová, Tereza Petržilková, Marcela Pírková, Lada Vondrová	3:33.24	SB	4
10	B	Switzerland	Cornelia Halbheer, Rachel Pellaud, Veronica Vancardo, Yasmin Giger	3:33.73		3
11	B	Sweden	Marie Kimumba, Linnea Killander, Lisa Lilja, Moa Hjelmer	3:35.97	SB	2
12	B	Finland	Eveliina Määttänen, Jeanine Nygård, Amira Chokairy, Ida Ravaska	3:37.32	SB	1

=== High jump ===
11 August

Rank	Name	Nationality	1.70	1.75	1.80	1.85	1.90	1.94	1.97	2.02	Result	Notes	Points
1	Yuliya Levchenko	Ukraine	–	–	o	o	o	xo	xxo	xxx	1.97		12
2	Erika Kinsey	Sweden	–	o	o	o	o	o	xxx		1.94		11
3	Alessia Trost	Italy	–	o	o	o	xxo	xo	x		1.94	=SB	10
4	Imke Onnen	Germany	–	o	o	o	o	xxx			1.90		9
5	Kamila Lićwinko	Poland	–	–	o	xo	o	xxx			1.90		8
6	Tatiana Gousin	Greece	–	o	o	o	xxx				1.85		7
7	Salome Lang	Switzerland	–	o	o	xo	xxx				1.85		6
8	Solène Gicquel	France	–	o	xo	xxo	x				1.85		5
9	Saleta Fernández	Spain	o	o	xo	xxx					1.80		3.5
9	Bára Sajdoková	Czech Republic	o	o	xo	xxx					1.80		3.5
11	Emma Nuttall	Great Britain	o	xo	xxo	x					1.80		2
	Ella Junnila	Finland									DNS		0

=== Pole vault ===
10 August

Rank	Name	Nationality	4.06	4.21	4.36	4.46	4.56	4.61	4.70	4.80	Result	Notes	Points
1	Ekaterini Stefanidi	Greece	–	–	–	–	o	–	xxo	xxr	4.70		12
2	Maryna Kylypko	Ukraine	o	o	xxo	o	o	xx			4.56	SB	11
3	Angelica Bengtsson	Sweden	–	–	o	xo	xx–	x			4.46		9.5
3	Ninon Guillon-Romarin	France	–	–	o	xo	x–	xx			4.46		9.5
5	Sonia Malavisi	Italy	o	o	o	xxo	xxx				4.46		8
6	Romana Maláčová	Czech Republic	o	o	xo	xxx					4.36		7
7	Angelica Moser	Switzerland	–	o	xxo	xx					4.36		6
8	Sophie Cook	Great Britain	o	o	xxx						4.21		4.5
8	Wilma Murto	Finland	o	o	xxx						4.21		4.5
10	Kamila Przybyła	Poland	xo	o	xxx						4.21		3
11	Miren Bartolomé	Spain	xxo	o	xx						4.21		2
	Lisa Ryzih	Germany	–	xxx							NM		0

=== Long jump ===
11 August

Rank	Name	Nationality	#1	#2	#3	#4	Result	Notes	Points
1	Malaika Mihambo	Germany	x	6.88	6.86w	7.11w	7.11w		12
2	Abigail Irozuru	Great Britain	6.75w	6.61	x	6.70	6.75w	SB	11
3	Éloyse Lesueur-Aymonin	France	6.72	6.36	6.70w	6.69	6.72		10
4	Fátima Diame	Spain	6.62w	6.29	6.60	6.13w	6.62w	SB	9
5	Taika Koilahti	Finland	6.59	6.46	6.53		6.59		8
6	Efthimia Kolokitha	Greece	6.43	x	x		6.43		7
7	Erika Kinsey	Sweden	6.26	6.29	x		6.29		6
8	Tania Vicenzino	Italy	5.87	6.15	6.27		6.27		5
9	Emma Piffaretti	Switzerland	x	6.02	6.24		6.24		4
10	Michaela Kučerová	Czech Republic	6.09	5.96	6.21		6.21		3
11	Magdalena Żebrowska	Poland	6.00w	6.15	x		6.15		2
12	Hanna Krasutska	Ukraine	5.92w	6.04w	6.12		6.12		1

=== Triple jump ===
10 August

Rank	Name	Nationality	#1	#2	#3	#4	Result	Notes	Points
1	Paraskevi Papahristou	Greece	x	14.48	x	x	14.48		12
2	Ana Peleteiro	Spain	13.66w	14.27	x	x	14.27		11
3	Ottavia Cestonaro	Italy	13.73	13.82w	14.18	x	14.18	PB	10
4	Olha Saladukha	Ukraine	14.00	x	14.11	x	14.11		9
5	Kristiina Mäkelä	Finland	14.09w	x	14.10		14.10		8
6	Kristin Gierisch	Germany	13.91	r	–		13.91		7
7	Naomi Ogbeta	Great Britain	13.67	13.90	13.83		13.90		6
8	Adrianna Szóstak	Poland	13.67w	13.50	13.26		13.67w		5
9	Emelie Nyman Wänseth	Sweden	12.67w	13.10w	13.01		13.10w		4
10	Maeva Phesor	France	13.04	12.92	13.03		13.04		3
11	Alina Tobler	Switzerland	x	12.86w	x		12.86w		2
12	Emma Maštalířová	Czech Republic	12.21	x	12.57		12.57		1

=== Shot put ===
11 August

Rank	Name	Nationality	#1	#2	#3	#4	Result	Notes	Points
1	Christina Schwanitz	Germany	18.89	18.79	18.93	x	18.93		12
2	Fanny Roos	Sweden	17.68	17.28	17.71	18.54	18.54		11
3	Sophie McKinna	Great Britain	17.94	16.91	17.92	17.88	17.94		10
4	Paulina Guba	Poland	x	17.58	17.77	x	17.77		9
5	Olha Golodna	Ukraine	16.40	17.18	x		17.18		8
6	Markéta Červenková	Czech Republic	16.91	16.88	17.11		17.11		7
7	Senja Mäkitörmä	Finland	16.55	16.12	16.14		16.55		6
8	Chiara Rosa	Italy	16.46	x	x		16.46		5
9	Úrsula Ruiz	Spain	16.15	16.36	x		16.36		4
10	Caroline Metayer	France	15.85	x	x		15.85		3
11	Evaggelia Sofani	Greece	14.47	15.35	15.05		15.35		2
12	Géraldine Ruckstuhl	Switzerland	13.65	13.84	13.48		13.84		1

=== Discus throw ===
9 August

Rank	Name	Nationality	#1	#2	#3	#4	Result	Notes	Points
1	Claudine Vita	Germany	57.02	61.09	59.94	x	61.09		12
2	Mélina Robert-Michon	France	60.61	57.89	x	60.47	60.61		11
3	Chrysoula Anagnostopoulou	Greece	56.80	57.12	58.92	59.02	59.02	SB	10
4	Daria Zabawska	Poland	56.82	58.38	57.50	56.80	58.38		9
5	Salla Sipponen	Finland	53.76	x	56.88		56.88		8
6	Daisy Osakue	Italy	55.74	54.59	x		55.74		7
7	Nataliya Semenova	Ukraine	55.30	50.81	53.43		55.30		6
8	Kirsty Law	Great Britain	54.78	52.54	x		54.78		5
9	Eliška Staňková	Czech Republic	54.00	53.89	51.99		54.00		4
10	Vanessa Kamga	Sweden	51.46	53.32	x		53.32		3
11	June Kintana	Spain	48.26	50.63	50.59		50.63		2
12	Chantal Tanner	Switzerland	x	47.72	x		47.72		1

=== Hammer throw ===
11 August

Rank	Name	Nationality	#1	#2	#3	#4	Result	Notes	Points
1	Alexandra Tavernier	France	70.00	72.66	72.79	72.81	72.81		12
2	Joanna Fiodorow	Poland	68.74	72.13	69.60	71.17	72.13		11
3	Iryna Klymets	Ukraine	71.67	66.02	71.05	70.64	71.67		10
4	Sara Fantini	Italy	66.80	65.39	67.81	64.91	67.81		9
5	Charlene Woitha	Germany	64.62	66.55	x		66.55		8
6	Kateřina Šafránková	Czech Republic	66.29	64.34	65.91		66.29		7
7	Berta Castells	Spain	65.35	x	64.67		65.35		6
8	Krista Tervo	Finland	x	64.72	63.19		64.72		5
9	Nicole Zihlmann	Switzerland	59.87	63.44	62.53		63.44		4
10	Sophie Hitchon	Great Britain	x	63.23	x		63.23		3
11	Stamatia Skarvelis	Greece	x	61.80	63.14		63.14		2
12	Ida Storm	Sweden	62.06	61.91	x		62.06		1

=== Javelin throw ===
10 August

Rank	Name	Nationality	#1	#2	#3	#4	Result	Notes	Points
1	Alexie Alaïs	France	63.46	55.95	62.02	63.26	63.46	PB	12
2	Maria Andrejczyk	Poland	57.51	54.37	63.39	62.03	63.39	SB	11
3	Irena Šedivá	Czech Republic	60.05	61.32	x	x	61.32	PB	10
4	Arantxa Moreno	Spain	57.94	52.86	57.64	51.72	57.94	SB	9
5	Sofia Ifantidou	Greece	49.11	51.89	55.52		55.52		8
6	Jenni Kangas	Finland	52.20	55.37	x		55.37		7
7	Carolina Visca	Italy	51.19	55.13	x		55.13		6
8	Tetyana Fetiskina	Ukraine	52.92	54.31	x		54.31		5
9	Julia Ulbricht	Germany	51.05	53.24	x		53.24		4
10	Anna Wessman	Sweden	48.69	50.43	51.39		51.39		3
11	Géraldine Ruckstuhl	Switzerland	50.70	48.69	49.75		50.70		2
12	Rebekah Walton	Great Britain	46.07	46.29	44.15		46.29		1
