= Jurich Carolina =

Curaçaoan footballer (born 1998)

Personal information
- Full name: Jurich Christopher Alexander Carolina
- Date of birth: 15 July 1998 (age 28)
- Place of birth: Willemstad, Curaçao
- Height: 1.77 m (5 ft 10 in)
- Position: Left-back

Team information
- Current team: Borac Banja Luka
- Number: 24

Youth career
- –2008: FC Hoensbroek
- 2008–2012: Fortuna Sittard
- 2012–2015: AZ

Senior career*
Years	Team	Apps	(Gls)
2015–2018	Jong PSV	58	(0)
2018–2020	NAC Breda	6	(0)
2019	→ Den Bosch (loan)	0	(0)
2020–2021	Stomil Olsztyn	40	(1)
2021–2024	Miedź Legnica	79	(2)
2022	Miedź Legnica II	5	(1)
2024–	Borac Banja Luka	44	(0)

International career^{‡}
2014–2015	Netherlands U17	4	(0)
2015–2017	Netherlands U19	15	(0)
2018–	Curaçao	17	(1)
- * Club domestic league appearances and goals as of 20 September 2026 ‡ National team caps and goals as of 4 October 2026

Jurich Christopher Alexander Carolina (born 15 July 1998) is a Curaçaoan professional footballer who plays as a left-back for Bosnian Premier League club Borac Banja Luka and the Curaçao national team.

== Club career ==
Carolina made his debut for Eerste Divisie side Jong PSV in 2015. In the 2015–16 season, he joined PSV. He played for AZ before he moved to Eindhoven.

== International career ==
Carolina is a former youth international for the Netherlands at the U17, and U19 levels. He made his international debut for the Curaçao national team in a 1–1 friendly tie with Bolivia on 23 March 2018.

== Career statistics ==
=== Club ===
As of match played 20 September 2026

Appearances and goals by club, season and competition
Club	Season	League			National cup (Note: Includes Dutch Cup, Polish Cup, Bosnian Cup)		Continental		Other		Total	
Club	Season	Division	Apps	Goals	Apps	Goals	Apps	Goals	Apps	Goals	Apps	Goals
Jong PSV	2015–16	Eerste Divisie	9	0	—		—		—		9	0
Jong PSV	2016–17	Eerste Divisie	18	0	—		—		—		18	0
Jong PSV	2017–18	Eerste Divisie	31	0	—		—		—		31	0
Jong PSV	Total		58	0	—		—		—		58	0
NAC Breda	2018–19	Eredivisie	6	0	1	0	—		—		7	0
Stomil Olsztyn	2019–20	I liga	11	0	—		—		—		11	0
Stomil Olsztyn	2020–21	I liga	29	1	1	0	—		—		30	1
Stomil Olsztyn	Total		40	1	1	0	—		—		41	1
Miedź Legnica	2021–22	I liga	27	2	1	0	—		—		28	2
Miedź Legnica	2022–23	Ekstraklasa	23	0	1	0	—		—		24	0
Miedź Legnica	2023–24	I liga	29	0	—		—		—		29	0
Miedź Legnica	Total		79	2	2	0	—		—		81	2
Miedź Legnica II	2022–23	III liga	5	1	—		—		—		5	1
Borac Banja Luka	2024–25	Bosnian Premier League	27	0	3	0	18 (Note: Four appearances in UEFA Champions League, four appearances in UEFA Europa League, ten appearances in UEFA Conference League)	0	1 (Note: Appearance in the Bosnian Supercup)	0	49	0
Borac Banja Luka	2025–26	Bosnian Premier League	14	0	0	0	1 (Note: Appearance(s) in UEFA Conference League)	0	—		15	0
Borac Banja Luka	2026–27	Bosnian Premier League	3	0	0	0	6	0	—		9	0
Borac Banja Luka	Total		44	0	3	0	25	0	1	0	73	0
Career total			232	4	7	0	25	0	1	0	265	4

=== International ===
As of match played 4 October 2026

Appearances and goals by national team and year
National team	Year	Apps	Goals
Curaçao	2018	5	0
Curaçao	2019	5	1
Curaçao	2024	5	0
Curaçao	2026	2	0
Total		17	1

Scores and results list Curaçao's goal tally first, score column indicates score after each Carolina goal.

List of international goals scored by Jurich Carolina
No.	Date	Venue	Opponent	Score	Result	Competition
1	8 June 2019	Chang Arena, Buriram, Thailand	Vietnam	1–0	1–1 (5–4 p)	2019 King's Cup

== Honours ==
Miedź Legnica

- I liga: 2021–22

Curaçao

- King's Cup: 2019

Borac Banja Luka

- Bosnian Premier League: 2025–26
