= Maxime Dominguez =

Swiss footballer (born 1996)

Personal information
- Date of birth: 1 February 1996 (age 30)
- Place of birth: Geneva, Switzerland
- Height: 1.73 m (5 ft 8 in)
- Position: Midfielder

Team information
- Current team: Marítimo
- Number: 8

Youth career
- 2009–2013: Servette

Senior career*
| Years | Team | Apps | (Gls) |
| 2013–2015 | Servette | 24 | (1) |
| 2015–2016 | Zürich | 2 | (0) |
| 2016–2020 | Lausanne-Sport | 64 | (10) |
| 2020–2021 | Neuchâtel Xamax | 31 | (4) |
| 2021–2023 | Miedź Legnica | 60 | (7) |
| 2023 | Raków Częstochowa | 0 | (0) |
| 2023–2024 | Gil Vicente | 37 | (6) |
| 2024–2026 | Vasco da Gama | 15 | (1) |
| 2025 | → Toronto FC (loan) | 24 | (0) |
| 2026 | Cracovia | 13 | (0) |
| 2026– | Marítimo | 0 | (0) |

International career
| 2011–2012 | Switzerland U16 | 5 | (0) |
| 2012 | Switzerland U17 | 2 | (0) |
| 2013–2014 | Switzerland U18 | 8 | (1) |
| 2014 | Switzerland U19 | 6 | (1) |
| 2016 | Switzerland U20 | 2 | (0) |
- * Club domestic league appearances and goals as of 16:44, 29 May 2026 (UTC)

Maxime Dominguez (born 1 February 1996) is a Swiss professional footballer who plays as a midfielder for Primeira Liga club Marítimo.

== Club career ==
Starting off his professional career with Servette FC in 2013, Dominguez represented three other clubs in Switzerland - Zürich, Lausanne-Sport, and Neuchâtel Xamax.

In June 2021, following the decision to not extend his contract with Neuchâtel Xamax, he left Switzerland to join Polish I liga side Miedź Legnica. On 10 July 2021, he signed a two-year deal with the club.

On 2 June 2023, the defending Ekstraklasa champions Raków Częstochowa announced that Dominguez would join them on 1 July 2023 on a two-year contract.

He only made one appearance for his new club, coming on as a substitute in the 2023 Polish Super Cup loss against Legia Warsaw on 15 July, before being transferred to Portuguese side Gil Vicente on 28 July, for a reported fee of €200.000. He signed a three-year contract.

In September 2024, he joined Campeonato Brasileiro Série A club Vasco da Gama. In April 2025, he was loaned to Toronto FC in Major League Soccer for the 2025 season, with Toronto holding a purchase option.

On 24 January 2026, Dominguez returned to Poland to sign with Ekstraklasa club Cracovia until June 2027.

On 1 July 2026, he signed for recently promoted Primeira Liga side Marítimo.

== Personal life ==
Born in Switzerland, Dominguez is of Spanish descent.

== Career statistics ==
As of match played 23 May 2026

Appearances and goals by club, season and competition
| Club | Season | League | | | National cup (Note: Includes Swiss Cup, Polish Cup, Taça de Portugal, Canadian Championship) | | Other | | Total | |
| Club | Season | Division | Apps | Goals | Apps | Goals | Apps | Goals | Apps | Goals |
|---|---|---|---|---|---|---|---|---|---|---|
| Servette | 2013–14 | Swiss Challenge League | 13 | 1 | 0 | 0 | — | | 13 | 1 |
| Servette | 2014–15 | Swiss Challenge League | 11 | 0 | 1 | 2 | — | | 12 | 2 |
| Servette | Total | | 24 | 1 | 1 | 2 | — | | 25 | 3 |
| Zürich | 2015–16 | Swiss Super League | 2 | 0 | 1 | 0 | — | | 3 | 0 |
| Lausanne-Sport | 2016–17 | Swiss Super League | 4 | 0 | 2 | 0 | — | | 6 | 0 |
| Lausanne-Sport | 2017–18 | Swiss Super League | 3 | 1 | 0 | 0 | — | | 3 | 1 |
| Lausanne-Sport | 2018–19 | Swiss Challenge League | 29 | 7 | 1 | 1 | — | | 30 | 8 |
| Lausanne-Sport | 2019–20 | Swiss Challenge League | 28 | 2 | 1 | 0 | — | | 29 | 2 |
| Lausanne-Sport | Total | | 64 | 10 | 4 | 1 | — | | 68 | 11 |
| Neuchâtel Xamax | 2020–21 | Swiss Challenge League | 31 | 4 | 1 | 0 | — | | 32 | 4 |
| Miedź Legnica | 2021–22 | I liga | 31 | 6 | 2 | 0 | — | | 33 | 6 |
| Miedź Legnica | 2022–23 | Ekstraklasa | 29 | 1 | 0 | 0 | — | | 29 | 1 |
| Miedź Legnica | Total | | 60 | 7 | 2 | 0 | — | | 62 | 7 |
| Raków | 2023–24 | Ekstraklasa | 0 | 0 | — | | 1 (Note: Appearance in Polish Super Cup) | 0 | 1 | 0 |
| Gil Vicente | 2023–24 | Primeira Liga | 33 | 6 | 3 | 0 | — | | 36 | 6 |
| Gil Vicente | 2024–25 | Primeira Liga | 4 | 0 | 0 | 0 | — | | 4 | 0 |
| Gil Vicente | Total | | 37 | 6 | 3 | 0 | — | | 40 | 6 |
| Vasco da Gama | 2024 | Série A | 8 | 1 | 0 | 0 | — | | 8 | 1 |
| Vasco da Gama | 2025 | Série A | — | | — | | 6 (Note: Appearance(s) in Campeonato Carioca) | 0 | 6 | 0 |
| Vasco da Gama | 2026 | Série A | — | | — | | 1 | 0 | 1 | 0 |
| Vasco da Gama | Total | | 8 | 1 | 0 | 0 | 7 | 0 | 15 | 1 |
| Toronto FC (loan) | 2025 | Major League Soccer | 24 | 0 | 1 | 0 | — | | 25 | 0 |
| Cracovia | 2025–26 | Ekstraklasa | 13 | 0 | — | | — | | 13 | 0 |
| Marítimo | 2026–27 | Primeira Liga | 0 | 0 | 0 | 0 | — | | 0 | 0 |
| Career total | | | 263 | 29 | 13 | 3 | 8 | 0 | 284 | 32 |

== Honours ==
FC Zürich

- Swiss Cup: 2015–16

Lausanne-Sport

- Swiss Challenge League: 2019–20

Miedź Legnica

- I liga: 2021–22
