= 2017 European Athletics U23 Championships – Men's 5000 metres =

Track event in Bydgoszcz, Poland

The men's 5000 metres event at the 2017 European Athletics U23 Championships was held in Bydgoszcz, Poland, at Zdzisław Krzyszkowiak Stadium on 15 July.

== Results ==
Rank	Name	Nationality	Time	Notes
1st place, gold medalist(s)	Yemaneberhan Crippa	Italy	14:14.28	
2nd place, silver medalist(s)	Simon Debognies	Belgium	14:14.71	
3rd place, bronze medalist(s)	Carlos Mayo	Spain	14:15.07	
4	Amanal Petros	Germany	14:15.14	
5	Hugo Hay	France	14:15.19	
6	Jordi Torrents	Spain	14:17.32	
7	István Szögi	Hungary	14:18.06	
8	Sebastian Hendel	Germany	14:19.59	
9	Raúl Celada	Spain	14:21.72	
10	Jonathan Dahlke	Germany	14:22.37	
11	Mykola Nyzhnyk	Ukraine	14:28.40	
12	Barry Keane	Ireland	14:29.07	
13	Sigurd Ruud Skjeseth	Norway	14:34.44	
14	Luca Noti	Switzerland	14:43.11	
15	Nicolas Witz	France	14:48.48	
	Jimmy Gressier	France	DQ	R163.3
	Said Ettaqy	Italy	DNF	
	Alex George	Great Britain	DNF	

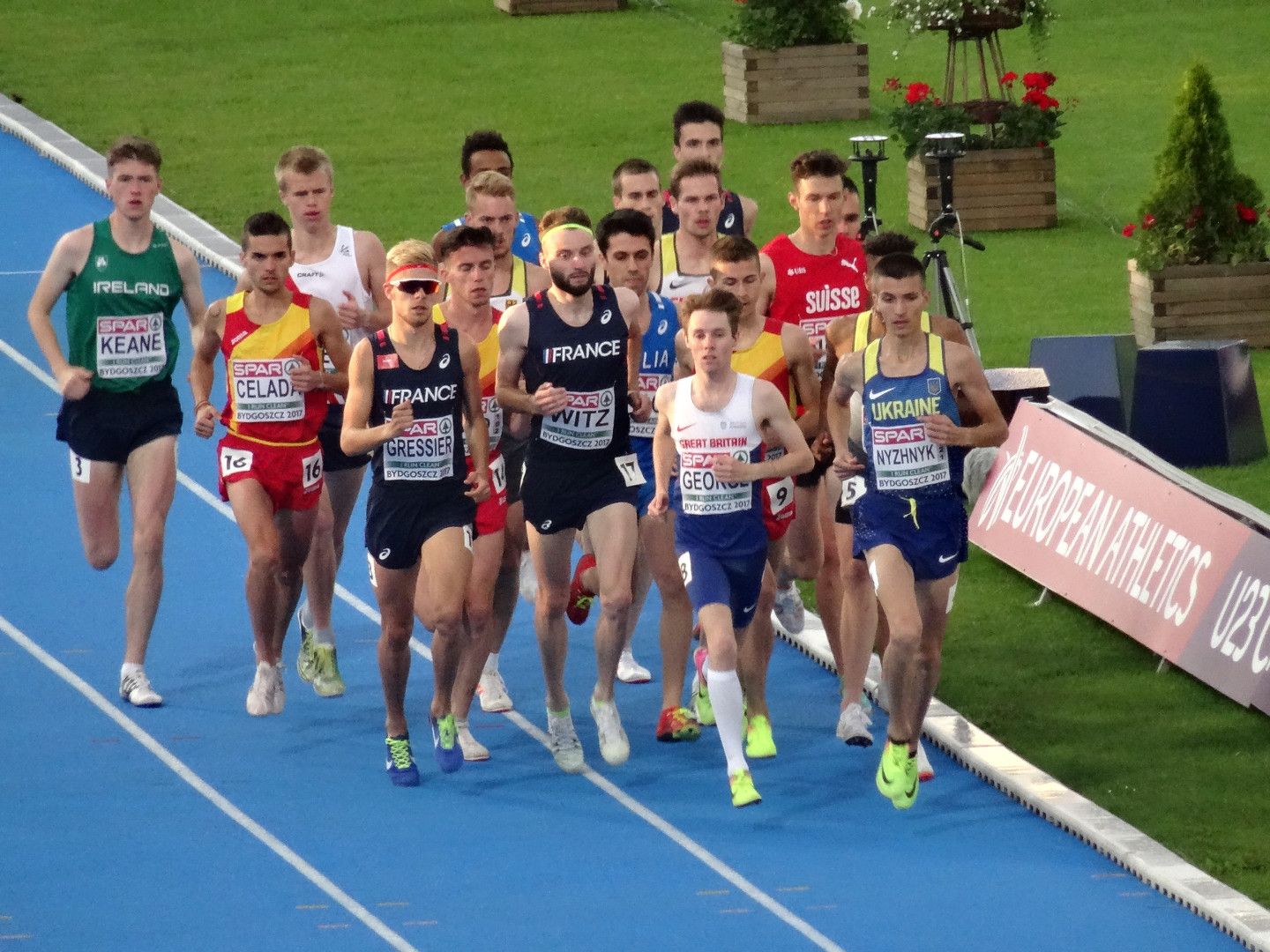
The race underway
