= 2022–23 Miedź Legnica season =

Miedź Legnica
2022–23 season
- Chairman: Tomasz Brusiło
- Manager: Grzegorz Mokry
- Stadium: Stadion im. Orła Białego
- Ekstraklasa: 18th (relegated)
- Polish Cup: First round
- Top goalscorer: League: Ángelo Henríquez (7); All: Ángelo Henríquez (7)
- Biggest win: Górnik Zabrze 0–3 Miedź Legnica
- Biggest defeat: Lechia Gdańsk 4–0 Miedź Legnica
Home colours	Away colours

The 2022–23 season was Miedź Legnica's 52nd season in existence and the club's first season back in the top flight of Polish football. In addition to the domestic league, Miedź Legnica participated in this season's edition of the Polish Cup. The season covered the period from 1 July 2022 to 30 June 2023.

== Players ==
=== First-team squad ===
As of 21 March 2023

Note: Flags indicate national team as defined under FIFA eligibility rules; some limited exceptions apply. Players may hold more than one non-FIFA nationality.

No.	Pos.	Nation	Player
1	GK	(Poland) POL	Paweł Lenarcik
3	DF	(Poland) POL	Hubert Matynia
5	DF	(Switzerland) SUI	Levent Gülen
6	MF	(Poland) POL	Szymon Matuszek
7	FW	(Chile) CHI	Ángelo Henríquez
8	MF	(Spain) ESP	Chuca
9	FW	(Netherlands) NED	Luciano Narsingh
10	MF	(Switzerland) SUI	Maxime Dominguez
11	FW	(Spain) ESP	Koldo Obieta
12	GK	(Poland) POL	Alan Madaliński
14	MF	(Poland) POL	Kamil Drygas
15	MF	(Mexico) MEX	Santiago Naveda (on loan from Club América)
16	MF	(Poland) POL	Dawid Drachal
17	DF	(Germany) GER	Michael Kostka
18	FW	(Cameroon) CMR	Emmanuel Agbor

No.	Pos.	Nation	Player
19	MF	(Bulgaria) BUL	Dimitar Velkovski
20	MF	(Poland) POL	Damian Tront
21	DF	(Greece) GRE	Giannis Masouras
23	DF	(Curaçao) CUW	Jurich Carolina
24	DF	(Poland) POL	Michał Pojasek
25	DF	(Montenegro) MNE	Nemanja Mijušković
27	DF	(Poland) POL	Andrzej Niewulis
28	DF	(Poland) POL	Mateusz Letkiewicz
31	GK	(Poland) POL	Mateusz Abramowicz
33	GK	(Poland) POL	Kacper Kapica
40	GK	(Greece) GRE	Stefanos Kapino
77	FW	(Poland) POL	Hubert Kwolek
79	MF	(Poland) POL	Olaf Kobacki (on loan from Arka Gdynia)
88	MF	(Poland) POL	Igor Lewandowski
—	GK	(Poland) POL	Filip Chadala
—	MF	(Poland) POL	Błażej Szczepanek

=== Out on loan ===
Note: Flags indicate national team as defined under FIFA eligibility rules; some limited exceptions apply. Players may hold more than one non-FIFA nationality.

No.	Pos.	Nation	Player
—	DF	(Poland) POL	Filip Balcewicz (at Polonia Warsaw until the end of 2022-23 season)
—	DF	(Netherlands) NED	Ruben Hoogenhout (at Resovia until the end of 2022-23 season)
—	MF	(Brazil) BRA	Bruno Garcia (at Resovia until the end of 2022-23 season)
—	MF	(Poland) POL	Mateusz Kaczmarek (at Wisła Puławy until the end of 2022-23 season)

No.	Pos.	Nation	Player
—	MF	(Belgium) BEL	Mehdi Lehaire (at Resovia until the end of 2022-23 season)
—	MF	(Poland) POL	Szymon Stróżyński (at Chojniczanka Chojnice until the end of 2022-23 season)
—	FW	(Poland) POL	Kacper Chmielewski (at Jelenia Góra until the end of 2022-23 season)

== Competitions ==
=== Ekstraklasa ===
==== League table ====
Pos	Team	Pld	W	D	L	GF	GA	GD	Pts	Qualification or relegation
14	Jagiellonia Białystok	34	9	14	11	48	49	−1	41	
15	Śląsk Wrocław	34	9	11	14	35	48	−13	38	
16	Wisła Płock (R)	34	10	7	17	41	50	−9	37	Relegation to I liga
17	Lechia Gdańsk (R)	34	8	6	20	28	56	−28	30	Relegation to I liga
18	Miedź Legnica (R)	34	4	11	19	33	55	−22	23	Relegation to I liga

Source: ekstraklasa.org
Rules for classification: 1) Points; 2) Head-to-head points; 3) Head-to-head goal difference; 4) Goal difference; 5) Goals scored; 6) Number of wins; 7) Number of away wins; 8) Lower number of points based on yellow and red cards (red card = 3 points, yellow card = 1 point, sending-off = 3 points - including 1 point for first yellow card); 9) Fairplay ranking; 10) Draw. (Note: Head-to-head record is used only after all the matches between the teams in question have been played)
(R) Relegated

==== Matches ====
The league fixtures were announced on 1 June 2022.

17 July 2022 1	Radomiak Radom	1–1	Miedź Legnica

=== Polish Cup ===
31 August 2022 First round	Resovia	1–0	Miedź Legnica	Rzeszów
				Stadium: Stadion Miejski w Rzeszowie
