= Yemaneberhan Crippa =

Italian long-distance runner (born 1996)

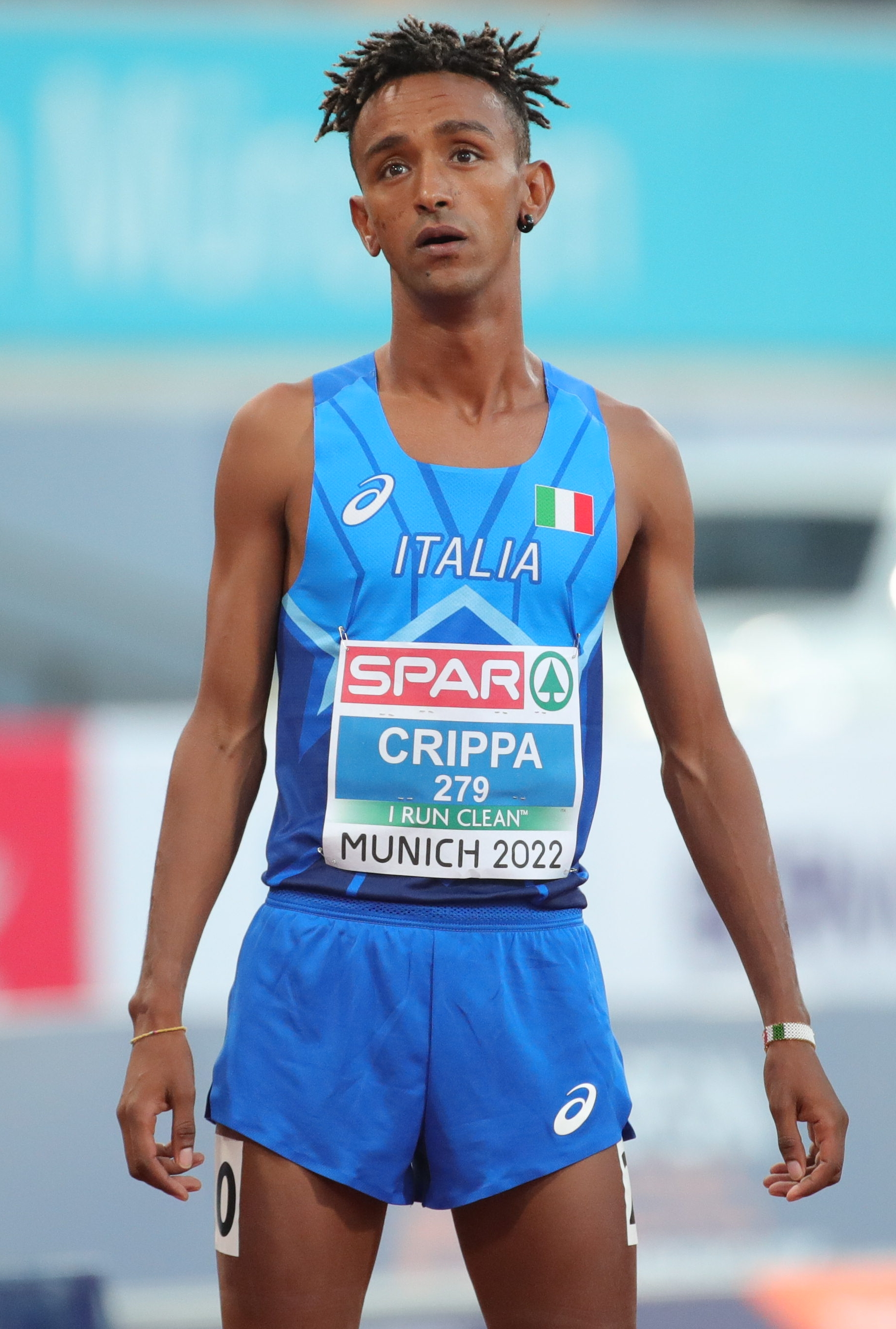
- Crippa in 2022

Personal information
- National team: Italy: 10 caps (2018–2020)
- Born: 15 October 1996 (age 30) Dessie, Wollo, Ethiopia
- Height: 1.74 m (5 ft 9 in)
- Weight: 53 kg (117 lb)

Sport
- Country: Italy
- Sport: Athletics
- Events: Long-distance running Cross country running
- Club: Valsugana Trentino; Fiamme Oro Padova
- Coached by: Massimo Pegoretti; Marco Borsari (2007–2011)

Achievements and titles
- Personal bests: 1500 m: 3:35.26 (2018); Mile: 3:52.08 (2020); 3000 m: 7:37.90 NR (2021); 5000 m: 13:02.26 NR (2020); 10,000 m: 27:10.76 NR (2019)
Medal record
Men's athletics
Representing Italy
International competitions
Event	1st	2nd	3rd
European Championships	3	0	2
European Team Championships	2	0	0
European Cross Country C'ships	0	1	2
European 10,000m Cup	2	0	1
Mediterranean Games	0	0	1
Total	7	1	6
World Marathon Majors
Silver medal – second place	2026 New York	Marathon
European Championships
Gold medal – first place	2022 Munich	10,000 m
Gold medal – first place	2024 Rome	Half marathon
Gold medal – first place	2024 Rome	Half marathon team
Bronze medal – third place	2018 Berlin	10,000 m
Bronze medal – third place	2022 Munich	5000 m
European Games
Bronze medal – third place	2023 Kraków-Małopolska	5000 m
European 10,000m Cup
Gold medal – first place	2023 Pacé	10,000 m
Gold medal – first place	2019 London	10,000 m
Bronze medal – third place	2018 London	10,000 m
European U23 Championships
Gold medal – first place	2017 Bydgoszcz	5000 m
European U20 Championships
Bronze medal – third place	2015 Eskilstuna	5000 m
European Cross Country Championships
Gold medal – first place	2014 Samokov	U20 race
Gold medal – first place	2015 Hyères	U20 race
Silver medal – second place	2022 Turin	Senior team
Silver medal – second place	2024 Antalya	Senior Men
Bronze medal – third place	2016 Chia	U23 race
Bronze medal – third place	2017 Šamorín	U23 race
Bronze medal – third place	2018 Tilburg	Senior team
Bronze medal – third place	2019 Lisbon	Senior race
Mediterranean Games
Bronze medal – third place	2018 Taragona	5000 m

Yemaneberhan "Yeman" Crippa (born 15 October 1996) is an Ethiopian-born Italian long-distance runner. He won the gold medal in the 10,000 metres and bronze for the 5000 metres at the European Athletics Championships in 2022, and bronze in the 10,000 m in 2018. Crippa claimed five medals in the age-group races at the European Cross Country Championships an Individual Bronze Medal in the Senior race in 2019 and followed up with an Individual Silver Medal performance at the 2024 European Cross Country Championships.

He earned the bronze medal in the 5000 m at the 2015 European Junior Championships and gold at the 2017 European U23 Championships. Crippa holds seven Italian records (3000 m, 5000 m out and indoors, 10,000 m, 5 km road race, half marathon and marathon) and won five national titles.

== Biography ==
Born in Dessie, in the north-eastern part of Ethiopia, Yemaneberhan lost his parents in the 1998–2000 Eritrean–Ethiopian War, and landed in an orphanage in Addis Abeba. He was adopted in 2001 by an Italian couple, Roberto and Luisa Crippa, and settled with them in Trento. He was one of the nine children adopted by the couple, together with his older brothers Nekagenet and Kelemu. At the beginning he concentrated on football before switching to running in 2007, both of his brothers also being runners.

Winning several medals in various age categories, Crippa made his senior debut at the 2016 European Championships in Amsterdam, finishing eighth in the 5000 metres. A year later, he placed seventh in the 3000 metres at the 2017 European Indoor Championships held in Belgrade.

In 2019, he set the 10,000 metres national record at the Doha World Championship with a time of 27:10.76.

Crippa represented Italy at the 2020 Tokyo Olympics, competing in the 5000 m, and 10,000 m events.

In February 2022, he broke the Italian half marathon record with a 59:26 performance in Naples, becoming the first Italian athlete to hold national records in the 3000 m, 5000 m, 10,000 m and half marathon. Crippa enjoyed a successful year by winning European 10,000 m gold and bronze in the 5000 m at Munich 2022.

In June 2023, he won the European 10,000m Cup.

He placed fourth at 10.000 meters at the 2026 European Championship in Birmingham.

== Achievements ==
=== Personal bests ===
- 800 metres: 1:50.16 (Trento 2016)
  - 1000 metres indoor: 2:32.88 (Ancona 2013)
- 1500 metres: 3:35.26 (Rovereto 2020)
  - 1500 metres indoor: 3:51.43 (Ancona 2015)
- 3000 metres: 7:37.90 (Gateshead 2021) NR
- 3000 metres U23: 7:43.30 (Ostrava 2018) NU23R
  - 3000 metres indoor: 7:57.25 (Ancona 2016)
- 5000 metres: 13:02.26 (Ostrava 2020) NR
- 5000 metres U23: 13:18.83 (Palo Alto, CA 2018) NU23R
  - 5000 metres indoor: 13:23.99 (Birmingham 2017) NR
- 10,000 metres: 27:10.76 (Doha 2019) NR
- 10,000 metres U23: 27:44.21 (London 2018)

Road

- 5 kilometres: 13:14 (Herzogenaurach 2022) NR
- 10 kilometres: 28:02 (Monza 2023)
- Half marathon: 59:26 (Naples 2022) NR
- Marathon: 2:05:18 (Paris 2026)

=== Competition record ===
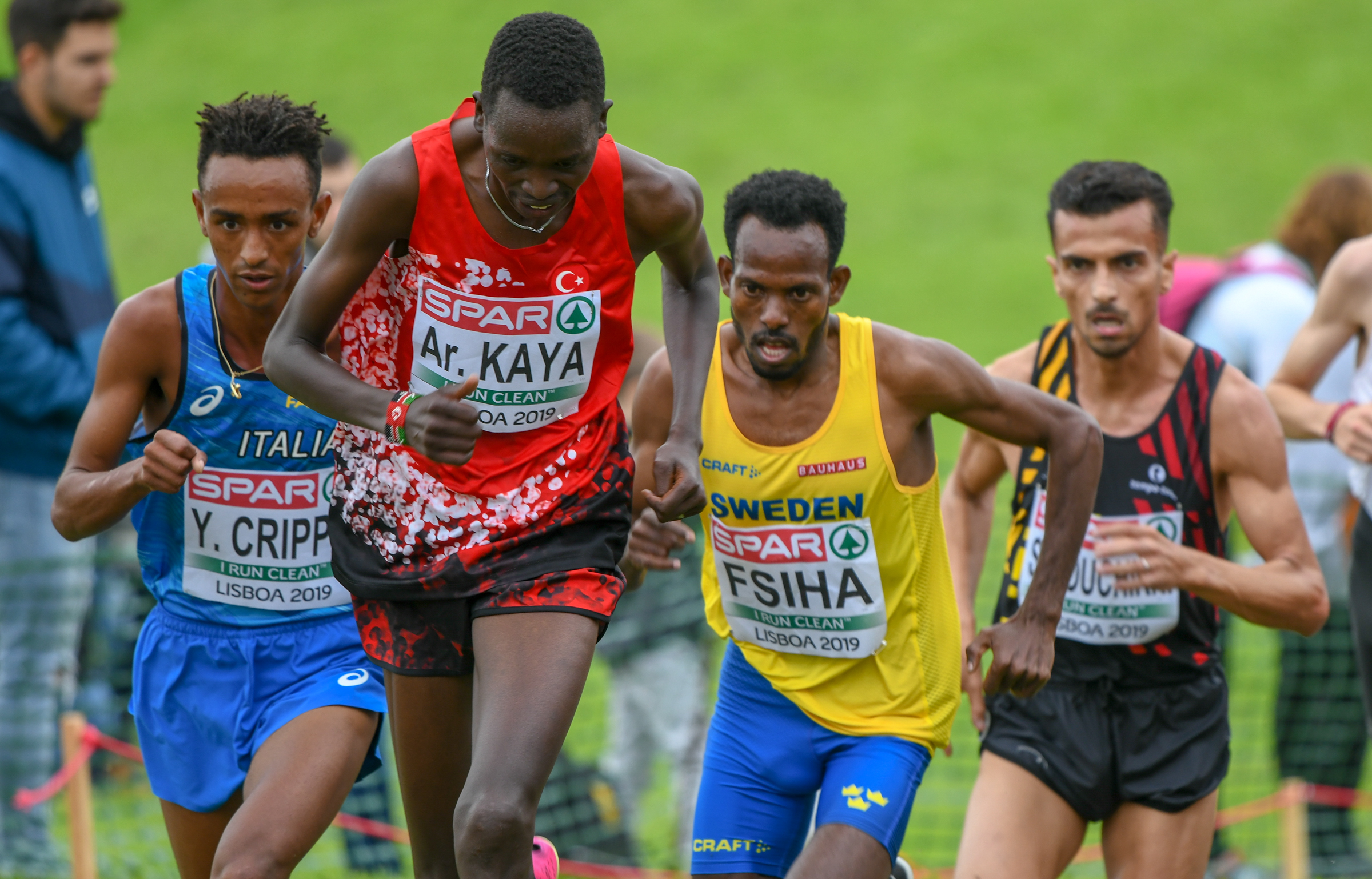
Yeman (far left) at the 2019 European Cross Country Championships.

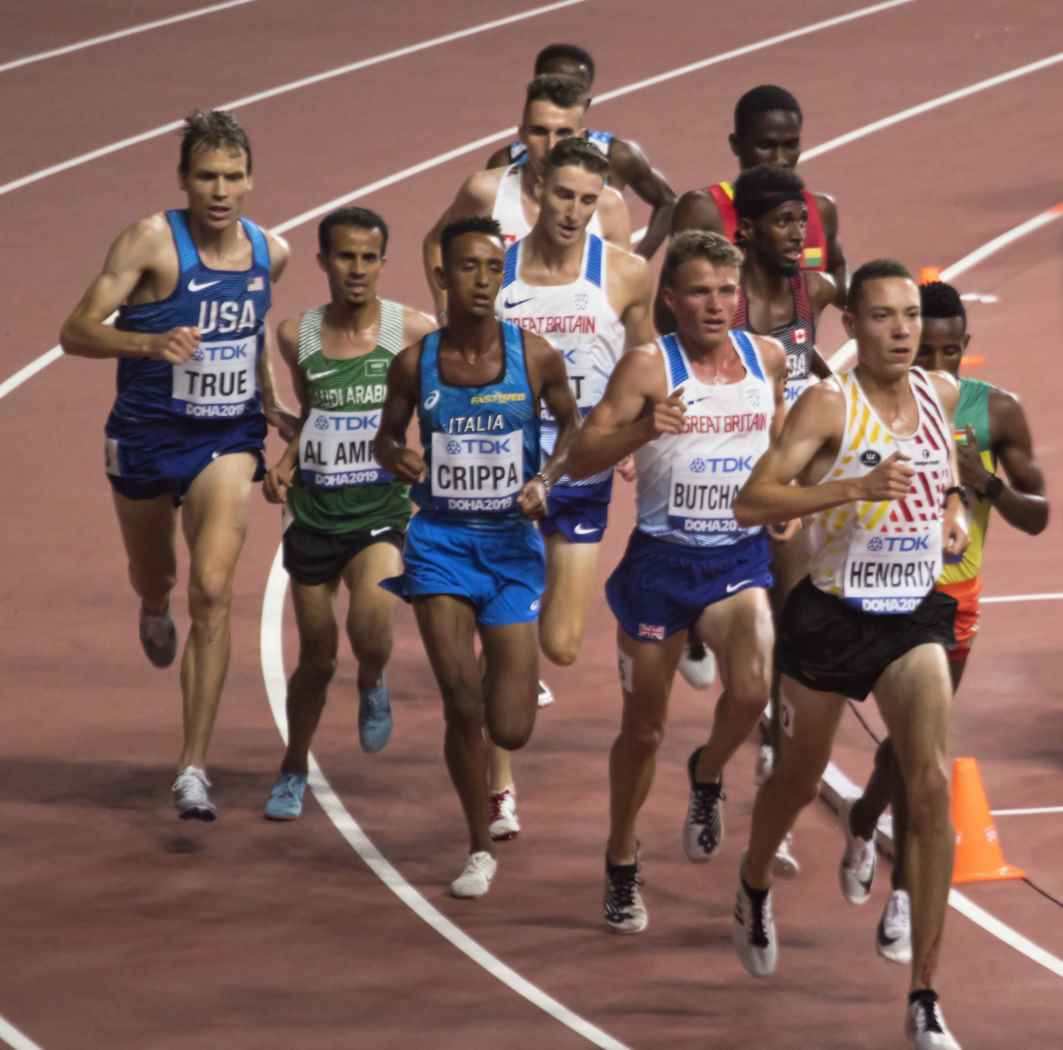
Crippa (center in blue) in group during 5000 m heat at the 2019 World Athletics Championships.

Representing Italy
Year	Competition	Venue	Position	Event	Result
2012	European Cross Country Championships	Budapest, Hungary	32nd	XC 6.03 km U20	19:33
2013	World Cross Country Championships	Bydgoszcz, Poland	38th	U20 race	23:26
2013	World Youth Championships	Donetsk, Ukraine	6th	1500 m	3:45.02
2013	European Cross Country Championships	Belgrade, Serbia	7th	XC 6.0 km U20	18:14
2014	World Junior Championships	Eugene, OR, United States	10th	1500 m	3:47.16
2014	World Junior Championships	Eugene, OR, United States	–	5000 m	DNS
2014	European Cross Country Championships	Samokov, Bulgaria	1st	XC 6.085 km U20	20:07
2015	World Cross Country Championships	Guiyang, China	20th	U20 race	24:52
2015	European Junior Championships	Eskilstuna, Sweden	3rd	5000 m	14:35.39
2015	European Cross Country Championships	Hyères, France	1st	XC 5.947 km U20	17:39
2016	European Championships	Amsterdam, Netherlands	8th	5000 m	13:46.30
2016	European Cross Country Championships	Chia, Italy	3rd	XC 7.97 km U23	22:54
2017	European Indoor Championships	Belgrade, Serbia	7th	3000 m	8:05.63
2017	European U23 Championships	Bydgoszcz, Poland	1st	5000 m	14:14.28
2017	European Cross Country Championships	Samorin, Slovakia	3rd	XC 8.23 km U23	24:42
2018	European 10,000m Cup	London, United Kingdom	3rd	10,000 m	27:44.21 NU23R
2018	Mediterranean Games	Tarragona, Spain	3rd	5000 m	13:56.53
2018	European Championships	Berlin, Germany	4th	5000 m	13:19.85
2018	European Championships	Berlin, Germany	3rd	10,000 m	28:12.15
2018	European Cross Country Championships	Tilburg, Netherlands	6th	XC 10.3 km	29:14
2018	European Cross Country Championships	Tilburg, Netherlands	3rd	Team	37 pts
2019	European 10,000m Cup	London, United Kingdom	1st	10,000 m	27:49.79 SB
2019	European Team Championships Super League	Bydgoszcz, Poland	4th	3000 m	8:03.69
2019	European Team Championships Super League	Bydgoszcz, Poland	1st	5000 m	13:43.30
2019	The Match Europe v USA	Minsk, Belarus	3rd	3000 m	7:58.11^{1}
2019	World Championships	Doha, Qatar	21st (h)	5000 m	13:29.08
2019	World Championships	Doha, Qatar	8th	10,000 m	27:10.76 NR
2019	European Cross Country Championships	Lisbon, Portugal	3rd	XC 10.3 km	30:21
2021	European Team Championships Super League	Chorzów, Poland	1st	5000 m	13:17.23 CR
2021	Olympic Games	Tokyo, Japan	29th (h)	5000 m	13:47.12
2021	Olympic Games	Tokyo, Japan	11th	10,000 m	27:54.05 SB
2021	European Cross Country Championships	Dublin, Ireland	–	XC 10.0 km	DNF
2022	European Championships	Munich, Germany	3rd	5000 m	13:24.83
2022	European Championships	Munich, Germany	1st	10,000 m	27:46.13
2022	European Cross Country Championships	Turin, Italy	4th	XC 9.572 km	29:47
2022	European Cross Country Championships	Turin, Italy	2nd	Team	25 pts
2023	World Championships	Budapest, Hungary	12th	10,000 m	28:16.40
2025	World Championships	Tokyo, Japan	–	Marathon	DNF
2026	European Championships	Birmingham, United Kingdom	4th	10,000 m	28:08.56
2026	World Road Running Championships	Copenhagen, Denmark	7th	Half marathon	59:18

^{1}Representing Europe

== National titles ==
- Italian Athletics Championships
  - 1500 metres: 2016
  - 5000 metres: 2022
- Italian Athletics Indoor Championships
  - 3000 metres: 2016
- Italian Cross Country Championships
  - Long race: 2016, 2019

== See also ==
- Italian all-time top lists - 5000 metres
- Italian all-time top lists - 10,000 metres
- Naturalized athletes of Italy
