= Michael Pohl =

German sprinter (born 1989)

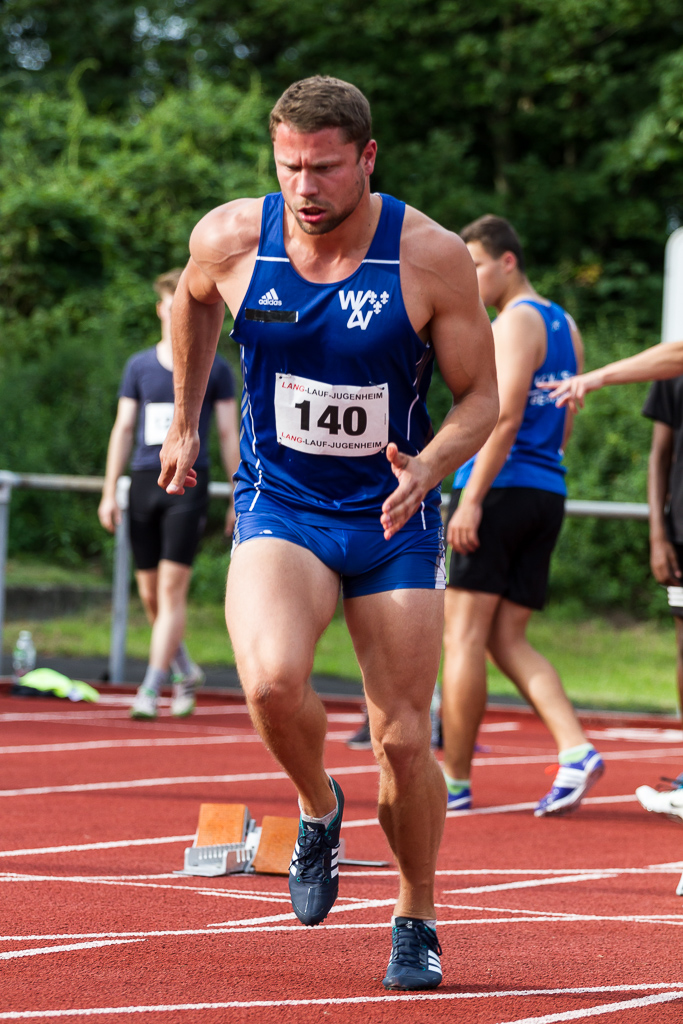
- Pohl in 2017

Personal information
- Nationality: German
- Born: 18 November 1989 (age 35)

Sport
- Sport: Athletics
- Event: Sprinting

Michael Pohl (born 18 November 1989) is a German athlete. He competed in the men's 60 metres at the 2018 IAAF World Indoor Championships. In 2019, he won the bronze medal in the team event at the 2019 European Games held in Minsk, Belarus.
