= 2026–27 FK Borac Banja Luka season =

Borac Banja Luka
2026–27 season
- Stadium: Banja Luka City Stadium
- Wwin liga BiH: Pre-season
- Bosnia and Herzegovina Football Cup: Pre-season
- Supercup of Bosnia and Herzegovina: Pre-season
- UEFA Champions League: First qualifying round

The 2026–27 season is the 101st season in the history of Fudbalski Klub Borac Banja Luka and the seventh consecutive season in the Premier League of Bosnia and Herzegovina. The club will also compete in the Bosnia and Herzegovina Football Cup, the Bosnia and Herzegovina Super Cup, and the UEFA Champions League.

== Transfers ==
=== In ===
Pos.	Player	Transferred from	Fee	Date	Source
MF	(Bosnia and Herzegovina) Amar Milak	(Bosnia and Herzegovina) Velež Mostar	Free	1 July 2026	
MF	(Croatia) Ante Roguljić	(Hungary) Diósgyőri VTK	Undisclosed	1 July 2026	
FW	(Spain) Dani Romera	(Bosnia and Herzegovina) FK Rudar Prijedor	Undisclosed	1 July 2026	

=== Out ===
Pos.	Player	Transferred to	Fee	Date	Source
MF	(Croatia) Dino Skorup	(Romania) Sepsi OSK	Loan return	30 June 2026	

== Pre-season ==
20 June 2026 Friendly	Jedinstvo Putevi (Serbia)	0–8	(Bosnia and Herzegovina) Borac Banja Luka
18:00

23 June 2026 Friendly	Borac Banja Luka (Bosnia and Herzegovina)	1–0	(Montenegro) Sutjeska
18:00

26 June 2026 Friendly	Borac Banja Luka (Bosnia and Herzegovina)	1–1	(Serbia) IMT
18:00	27'		75'

29 June 2026 Friendly	Borac Banja Luka (Bosnia and Herzegovina)	1–3	(Russia) Akhmat Grozny
18:00	48'		22'; 76'; 86' (pen.)

== Competitions ==
=== Overall record ===
Competition	First match	Last match	Starting round	Final position	Record							
Competition	First match	Last match	Starting round	Final position	Pld	W	D	L	GF	GA	GD	Win %
Wwin liga BiH			Matchday 1		0	0	0	0	0	0	+0	—
Bosnia and Herzegovina Football Cup					0	0	0	0	0	0	+0	—
Supercup of Bosnia and Herzegovina			Matchday 1		0	0	0	0	0	0	+0	—
UEFA Champions League	7 July 2026	14 July 2026	First qualifying round	First qualifying round	2	0	1	1	1	5	−4	0.00
UEFA Europa League	23 July 2026		Second qualifying round		0	0	0	0	0	0	+0	—
Total					2	0	1	1	1	5	−4	0.00

Source: Competitions

=== First qualifying round ===
7 July 2026 First leg	Borac Banja Luka (Bosnia and Herzegovina)	1–1	(Bulgaria) Levski Sofia	Banja Luka
20:30 UTC+2	Juričić 9' (pen.)		Oko-Flex 55'	Stadium: Banja Luka City Stadium; Referee: Mehmet Türkmen (Turkey)

14 July 2026 Second leg	Levski Sofia (Bulgaria)	4–0 (5–1 agg.)	(Bosnia and Herzegovina) Borac Banja Luka	Bulgaria
20:30 UTC+3

=== Second qualifying round ===
23 July 2026 First leg	Borac Banja Luka (Bosnia and Herzegovina)	3–0	(Moldova) Petrocub Hîncești	Banja Luka
20:30				Stadium: Banja Luka City Stadium; Referee: Jakob Sundberg (Denmark)

30 July 2026 Second leg	Petrocub Hîncești (Moldova)	3–3 (3–6 agg.)	(Bosnia and Herzegovina) Borac Banja Luka	Moldova
19:00 UTC+3

=== Third qualifying round ===
6 August 2026 First leg	Borac Banja Luka (Bosnia and Herzegovina)	1–0	(Belarus) ML Vitebsk	Banja Luka
20:30				Stadium: Banja Luka City Stadium; Referee: Jakob Sundberg (Denmark)

13 August 2026 Second leg	ML Vitebsk (Belarus)	2–1 (2–2 agg.)	(Bosnia and Herzegovina) Borac Banja Luka	Moldova
19:00 UTC+3

=== Playoff round ===
20 August 2026 First leg	Víkingur Reykjavik (Iceland)	1–3	(Bosnia and Herzegovina) Borac Banja Luka	Banja Luka
20:15				Stadium: Banja Luka City Stadium; Referee: Jakob Sundberg (Denmark)

27 August 2026 Second leg	Borac Banja Luka (Bosnia and Herzegovina)	v	(Iceland) Víkingur Reykjavik	Moldova
19:00 UTC+3
