= Hugo Hay =

French runner

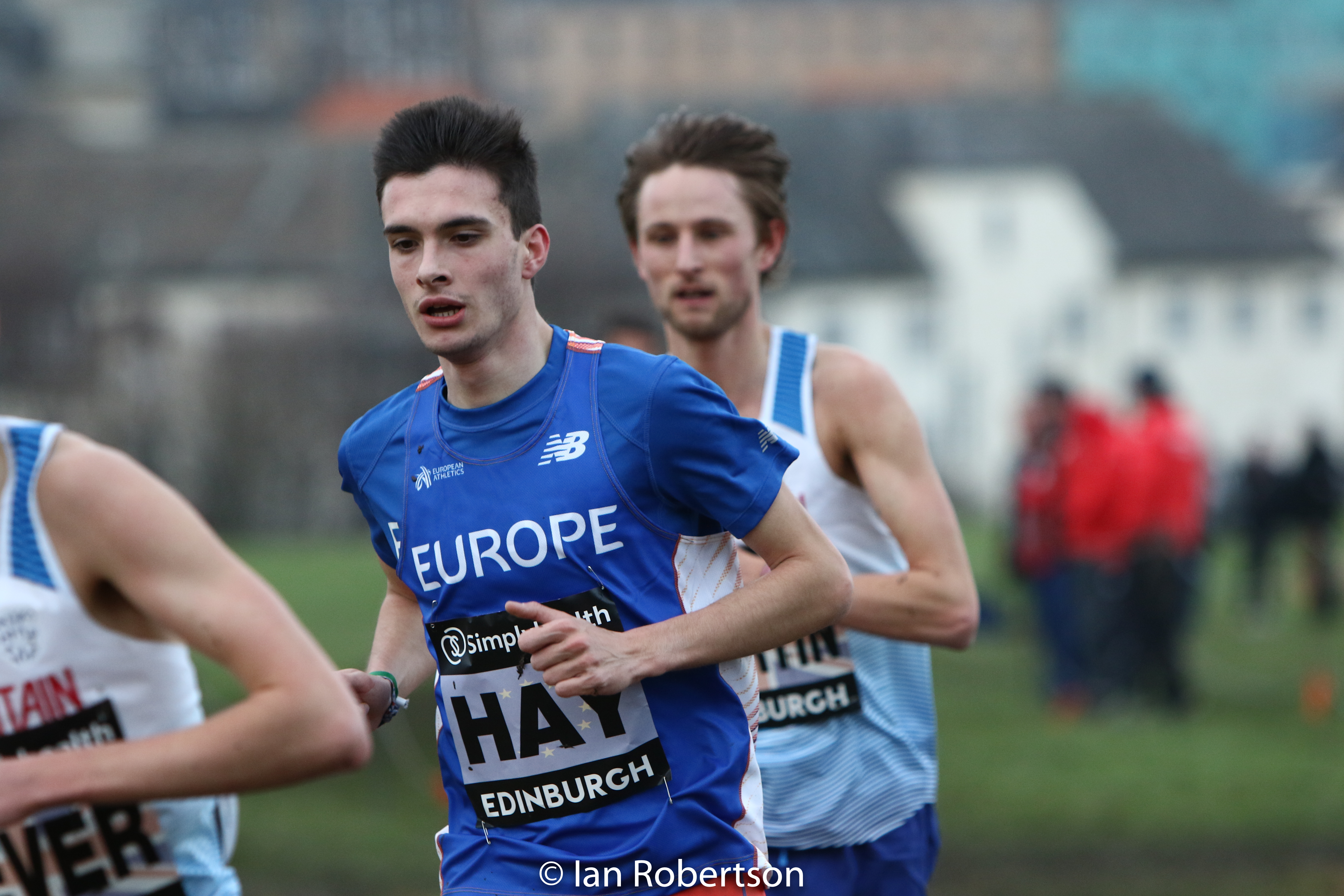
- Hugo Hay in 2018

Personal information
- Born: 28 March 1997 (age 29) Bressuire, France
- Height: 1.82 m (6 ft 0 in)
- Weight: 61 kg (134 lb)

Sport
- Sport: Athletics
- Events: 5000 metres, 1500 metres, cross-country
- Club: Sèvre Bocage AC
- Coached by: Jamain Abel; Tim Moriau

Hugo Hay (born 28 March 1997 in Bressuire) is a French middle- and long-distance runner. He represented his country at the 2021 European Indoor Championships finishing sixth in the 3000 metres. In addition, he won a bronze medal in the 5000 metres at the 2019 European U23 Championships.

== International competitions ==
Year	Competition	Venue	Position	Event	Notes
Representing France
2015	European Junior Championships	Eskilstuna, Sweden	6th	5000 m	14:43.86
2017	European U23 Championships	Bydgoszcz, Poland	5th	5000 m	14:15.19
2019	European U23 Championships	Gävle, Sweden	2nd	5000 m	14:17.00
2021	European Indoor Championships	Toruń, Poland	6th	3000 m	7:51.82
2021	Olympic Games	Tokyo, Japan	18th (h)	5000 m	13:39.95
2022	European Championships	Munich, Germany	19th	5000 m	13:45.63
2023	World Championships	Budapest, Hungary	27th (h)	5000 m	13:39.76
2024	Olympic Games	Paris, France	16th	5000 m	13:26.71

== Personal bests ==
Outdoor

- 800 metres – 1:55.02 (Angoulême 2018)
- 1500 metres – 3:38.73 (Heusden-Zolder 2020)
- 3000 metres – 7:41.78 (Monaco 2022)
- 5000 metres – 13:02.62 (Heusden-Zolder 2023)

Indoor

- 3000 metres – 7:47.30 (Toruń 2021)
