= Nick Goolab =

British distance runner (born 1990)

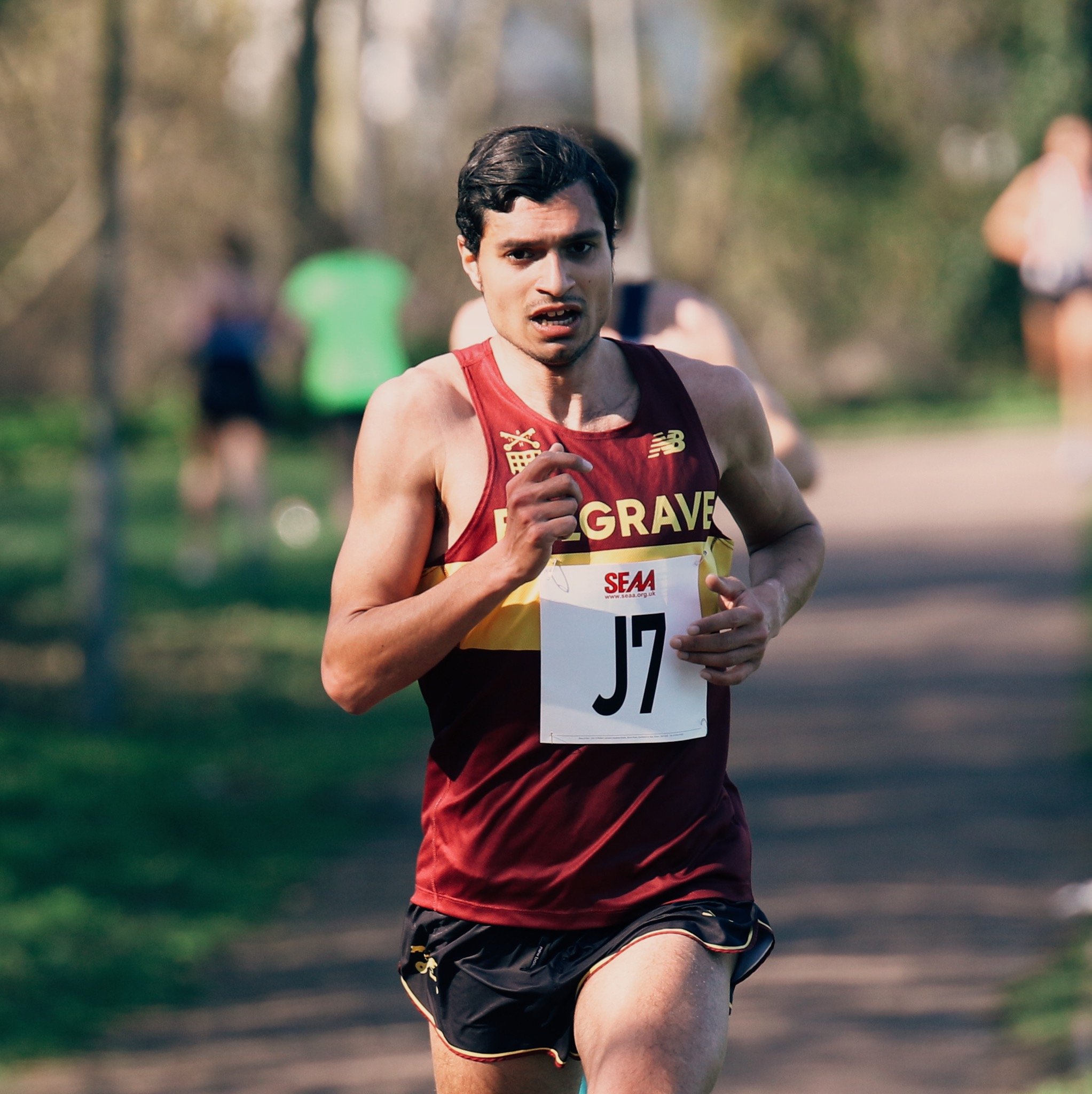

Personal information
- Born: 30 January 1990 (age 36) London, England
- Education: University of Birmingham

Sport
- Sport: Athletics
- Events: 3000 m, 5000 m, 10,000 m, Cross country running
- Club: Belgrave Harriers
- Coached by: Craig Winrow

Achievements and titles
- Personal bests: 3000 m: 7:42.22; 5K: 13:27

Nicholas Anthony Goolab (born 30 January 1990) is a British distance runner. He is the former British 5k record holder, previously held the English 5k and 10k titles concurrently, and has represented Great Britain at World and European cross country and track championships.

== Junior career ==
After impressing his PE teacher in a bleep test, Goolab was asked to represent his school in a cross country race, which led to him joining his local athletics club as an under-15 in 2004.

In 2008 Goolab joined Belgrave Harriers and was part of the 12-man squad to win bronze at the English national 12-stage road relay championships.

In 2009 became the English National junior cross country champion, the junior intercounties cross country champion, and was part of the Belgrave team to win gold at the National 12-stage road relays. He also won the junior race at the International cross competition in Lisbon, Portugal.

In 2010 Goolab defended his English junior cross country title in addition to winning gold in the 5000m at the British Universities championships, competing for the University of Birmingham.

In 2011 he won the British Universities cross country title, beating future Olympians Ross Murray and Jonny Brownlee.

== Senior career ==
In 2015 Goolab joined Craig Winrow's training group based at St Mary's University in Teddington, South West London.

In 2016 he won the Vitality Westminster Mile road race, beating Olympian Andrew Butchart in a photo-finish, a title he would successfully defend the following year the day after setting his 5000m track personal best of 13:33.48.

In 2017 Goolab set his 3000m personal best of 7:42.22 at the IAAF Diamond League meet as part of the Muller Anniversary Games held at London's Olympic Stadium.

In 2018, following a second-place finish at the European cross country trials in Liverpool, Goolab represented Great Britain at the European cross country championships held in Tilburg, Netherlands, finishing 47th.

=== Senior national titles ===
In 2019 Goolab stepped up from the mile to longer distances on the road, winning the England Athletics 5k and 10k titles in races in Ipswich and Brighton respectively. He also won bronze at the British Athletics 10k championships held as part of the Vitality London 10000 race. Goolab had led at the half-way point but was eventually beaten by Mo Farah and Andrew Butchart.

In summer 2019 Goolab represented Great Britain in the 10000m at the European Cup competition held as part of the Night of the 10,000m PBs event in London, finishing 8th in a time of 28:10.49. The performance won Goolab silver in the British championships and helped win silver for his country in the international competition.

In February 2020 Goolab broke the British 5k record previously shared by Mo Farah and Rob Denmark, bettering their mark by three seconds to record a time of 13:27. In the same race, held in Monaco, Ugandan Joshua Cheptegai set a new world record of 12:51. Goolab's record lasted until 8 August 2020 when Marc Scott ran 13:20 at a road race in Barrowford, Lancashire.

== Personal life ==
Goolab lives in Ealing, West London, and works part-time as a maths tutor. He holds a first class degree in mathematics from the University of Birmingham.
