= 2017 German Athletics Championships =

- Dates: 8–9 July 2016
- Host city: Erfurt, Germany
- Venue: Steigerwaldstadion
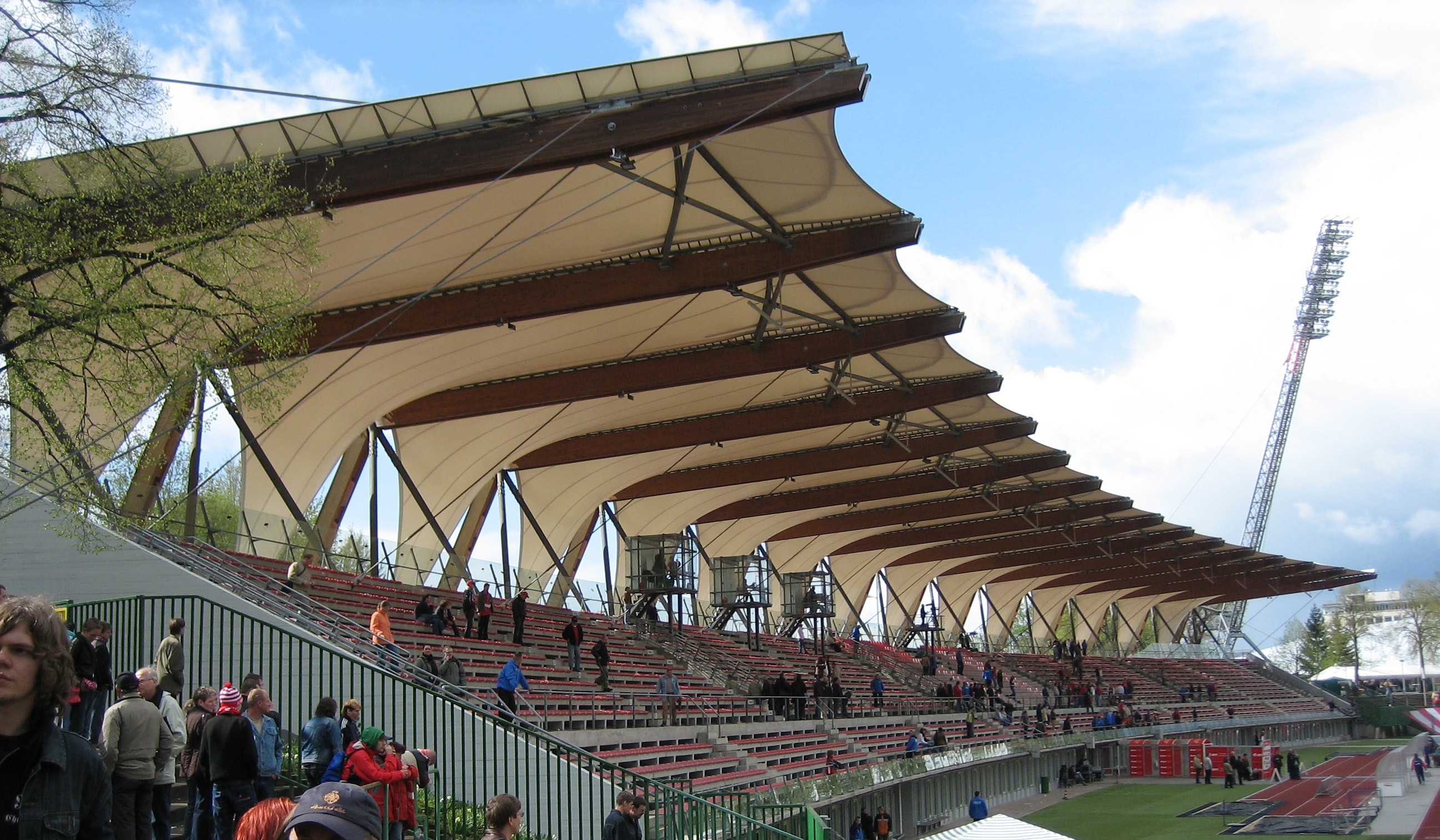

The 2017 German Athletics Championships was the 117th edition of the national championship in outdoor track and field for Germany. It was held on 8 and 9 July at the Steigerwaldstadion in Erfurt. It served as the selection meeting for Germany at the 2017 World Championships in Athletics.

Three championship records were beaten during the competition: Johannes Vetter set the standard in the men's javelin with 89.35 m (293 ft 1 1/2 in), Konstanze Klosterhalfen set a women's 1500 metres best of 3:59.58 minutes, while Gesa Felicitas Krause won a distance double in the 5000 metres and 3000 metres steeplechase (championship record of 9:25.81 minutes). Julian Reus claimed a sprint double in the men's 100 metres and 200 metres.

== Championships ==
The annual national championships in Germany comprised the following competitions:

- Cross Country: Löningen, 11 March
- Half marathon: Hannover, 9 April
- 20 km walk: Naumburg, 23 April
- 10,000 m: Bautzen, 13 May
- Mountain Run: Bayerisch Eisenstein, 10 June
- 100 km road race: Berlin, 24 June
- Relays: Ulm, 6 August
- Combined events: Kienbaum, 12–13 August
- 10K run: Bad Liebenzell, 3 September
- Track walking: Diez, 16 September
- 50 km walk: Gleina, 14 October
- Marathon: within the Frankfurt Marathon, 29 October

== Results ==
=== Men ===
Event	Gold		Silver		Bronze	
100 metres	Julian Reus; TV Wattenscheid 01	10.10	Michael Pohl; Wiesbadener LV	10.26	Roy Schmidt; SC DHfK Leipzig	10.28
200 metres	Julian Reus; TV Wattenscheid 01	20.29	Robin Erewa; TV Wattenscheid 01	20.50	Aleixo Platini Menga; TSV Bayer 04 Leverkusen	20.55
400 metres	Johannes Trefz; LG Stadtwerke München	45.84	Patrick Schneider; LAC Quelle Fürth	46.02	Marc Koch; LG Nord Berlin	46.18
800 metres	Benedikt Huber; LG Telis Finanz Regensburg	1:48.21 min	Jan Riedel; Dresdner SC 1898	1:48.24 min	Kevin Stadler; LAC Erfurt	1:49.01 min
1500 metres	Timo Benitz; LG farbtex Nordschwarzwald	3:38.77 min	Homiyu Tesfaye; Eintracht Frankfurt	3:40.09 min	Marcel Fehr; SG Schorndorf 1846	3:40.49 min
5000 metres	Richard Ringer; VfB LC Friedrichshafen	14:15.90 min	Simon Boch; LG Telis Finanz Regensburg	14:21.41 min	Philipp Baar; ART Düsseldorf	14:27.04 min
10,000 metres	Simon Boch; LG Telis Finanz Regensburg	29:13.60 min	Amanal Petros; SV Brackwede	29:15.62 min	Sebastian Reinwand; ART Düsseldorf	29:16.80 min
10K run	Amanal Petros; SV Brackwede	29:02 min	Simon Boch; LG Telis Finanz Regensburg	29:03 min	Philipp Pflieger; LG Telis Finanz Regensburg	29:10 min
10K run team	LG Telis Finanz Regensburg I Simon Boch; Philipp Pflieger; Florian Orth	1:27:28 h	LG Telis Finanz Regensburg II; Tim Ramdane Cherif; Jonas Koller; Felix Plinke	1:29:46 h	TV Wattenscheid 01; Hendrik Pfeiffer; Jan Hense; Christoph Uphues	1:31:30 h
Half marathon	Philipp Baar; ART Düsseldorf	1:04:57 h	Hendrik Pfeiffer; TV Wattenscheid 01	1:05:09 h	Andreas Straßner; ART Düsseldorf	1:06:00 h
Half marathon team	ART Düsseldorf I Philipp Baar; Andreas Straßner; Simon Stützel	3:16:59 h	LG Telis Finanz Regensburg; Simon Boch; Tim Ramdane Cherif; Felix Plinke	3:20:48 h	ART Düsseldorf II; Sebastian Reinwand; Julian Flügel; Timo Göhler	3:21:55 h
Marathon	Arne Gabius; TherapieReha Bottwartal	2:09:59 h	Jonas Koller; LG Telis Finanz Regensburg	2:16:03 h	Frank Schauer; Tangermünder Elbdeich-Marathon	2:16:30 h
Marathon team	ART Düsseldorf I Timo Göhler; Andreas Strassner; Paul Schmidt	7:07:09 h	LAC Olympia 88 Berlin; Felix Ledwig; Tobias Singer; Carsten Krüger	7:32:20 h	LSF Münster; David Schönherr; Yannick Rinne; Sven Serke	7:37:54 h
100 kilometres	Benedikt Hoffmann; TSG 1845 Heilbronn	6:48:15 h	André Collet; Aachener TG	7:02:59 h	Benjamin Brade; LG Nord Berlin Ultrateam	7:31:20 h
100 kilometres team	LG Mauerweg Berlin e.V. Sascha Dehling; Mathias De Prest; Andreas Urbaniak	26:45:25 h	LG Nord Berlin Ultrateam; Benjamin Brade; Christian Karbe; Hans-Joachim Dierkopf	27:21:15 h	LG Ultralauf; Thomas Klingenberger; Konrad Vogl; Roland Krauß	27:48:30 h
110 m hurdles	Matthias Bühler; Eintracht Frankfurt	13.50	Gregor Traber; LAV Stadtwerke Tübingen	13.55	Erik Balnuweit; TV Wattenscheid 01	13.68
400 m hurdles	Luke Campbell; Eintracht Frankfurt	49.40	Georg Fleischhauer; Eintracht Frankfurt	50.30	Max Scheible; TuS Lörrach-Stetten	50.57
3000 m s'chase	Tim Stegemann; LAC Erfurt	8:43.40 min	Martin Grau; LSC Höchstadt/Aisch	8:43.42 min	Fabian Clarkson; SCC Berlin	8:46.34 min
4 × 100 m relay	TV Wattenscheid 01 I Maximilian Ruth; Robin Erewa; Alexander Kosenkow; Maurice Huke	39.01	TSV Bayer 04 Leverkusen; Robert Polkowski; Daniel Hoffmann; Kai Köllmann; Aleixo-Platini Menga	39.24	TV Wattenscheid 01 II; Kevin Ugo; Philipp Trutenat; Carlo Weckelmann; Erik Balnuweit	39.99
4 × 400 m relay	StG Schlüchtern-Flieden-Oberts; Eric Herbert; Aleksi Rösler; Jaakkima Rösler; Constantin Schmidt	3:09.08 min	StG Chemnitz Erzgebirge; Maximilian Grupen; Florian Handt; Johann Rosin; Marvin Schlegel	3:09.60 min	LG Nord Berlin; Philipp Kleemann; Marc Koch; Marcel Matthäs; Johannes Wuthe	3:11.59 min
3 × 1000 m relay	LG Braunschweig; Julius Lawnik; Andreas Lange; Viktor Kuk	7:12.47 min	StG Erfurt-Jena; Kevin Stadler; Tim Stegemann; Philipp Reinhardt	7:12.62 min	LSC Höchstadt/Aisch; Tobias Budde; Martin Grau; Marco Kürzdörfer	7:13.70 min
10,000 m walk	Hagen Pohle; SC Potsdam	39:39.45 min	Christopher Linke; SC Potsdam	40:10.08 min	Nils Brembach; SC Potsdam	40:29.91 min
20 km walk	Christopher Linke; SC Potsdam	1:20:26 h	Nils Brembach; SC Potsdam	1:20:43 h	Karl Junghannß; LAC Erfurt	1:22:08 h
20 km walk team	SC Potsdam; Christopher Linke; Nils Brembach; Hagen Pohle	4:03:38 h	TV Bühlertal; Nathaniel Seiler; Denis Franke; Georg Hauger	5:10:02 h	SV Breitenbrunn; Steffen Meyer; Nischan Daimer; Joachim Maier	5:33:43 h
50 km walk	Nathaniel Seiler; TV Bühlertal	4:00:43.5 h	Jonathan Hilbert; LG Ohra Energie	4:05:48.3 h	Denis Franke; TV Bühlertal	5:04:47.8 h
High jump	Mateusz Przybylko; TSV Bayer 04 Leverkusen	2.30 m	Eike Onnen; Hannover 96	2.19 m	Luca Wieland; LAZ Saar 05 Saarbrücken	2.15 m
Pole vault	Bo Kanda Lita Baehre; TSV Bayer 04 Leverkusen	5.60 m	Raphael Holzdeppe; LAZ Zweibrücken	5.60 m	Tobias Scherbarth; TSV Bayer 04 Leverkusen	5.40 m
Long jump	Julian Howard; LG Region Karlsruhe	8.15 m	Maximilian Entholzner; 1.FC Passau	7.76 m	Luca Wieland; LAZ Saar 05 Saarbrücken	7.71 m
Triple jump	Max Heß; LAC Erdgas Chemnitz	17.24 m	Felix Wenzel; SC Potsdam	16.15 m	Tobias Hell; Schweriner SC	15.87 m
Shot put	David Storl; SC DHfK Leipzig	20.98 m	Jan Josef Jeuschede; TSV Bayer 04 Leverkusen	19.31 m	Simon Bayer; VfL Sindelfingen	19.09 m
Discus throw	Robert Harting; SCC Berlin	65.65 m	Martin Wierig; SC Magdeburg	64.29 m	Markus Münch; SC Potsdam	62.76 m
Hammer throw	Alexander Ziegler; SV Thurn und Taxis Dischingen	71.66 m	Andreas Sahner; LC Rehlingen	70.89 m	Johannes Bichler; LG Stadtwerke München	70.65 m
Javelin throw	Johannes Vetter; LG Offenburg	89.35 m CR	Thomas Röhler; LC Jena	85.24 m	Bernhard Seifert; SC Potsdam	84.62 m
Decathlon	Felix Hepperle; LG Neckar-Enz	7328 pts	Marvin Gregor; LC Paderborn	7002 pts	Alexander Everts; TSV Bayer 04 Leverkusen	6800 pts
Decathlon	TSV Gräfelfing; Korbinian Suckfüll; Felix Wolter; Noah Kollhuber	20.349 pts	TS Herzogenaurach; André Zahl; Marius Laib; Daniel Hoseus	17.312 pts	Only two finishers	
Cross country short course – 4.36 km	Florian Orth; LG Telis Finanz Regensburg	13:07 min	Timo Benitz; LG farbtex Nordschwarzwald	13:15 min	Martin Grau; LSC Höchstadt/Aisch	13:18 min
Cross country short course team	LG Telis Finanz Regensburg; Florian Orth; Simon Boch; Tim Ramdane Cherif	10	LG farbtex Nordschwarzwald; Timo Benitz; Denis Bäuerle; Hendrik Engel	25	LG Zusam; Tobias Gröbl; Ja Johannes Estner; Mario Leser	39
Cross country long course – 10.28 km	Philipp Pflieger; LG Telis Finanz Regensburg	31:56 min	Fabian Clarkson; SCC Berlin	32:31 min	Philipp Baar; ART Düsseldorf	32:42 min
Cross country long course team	LG Telis Finanz Regensburg; Philipp Pflieger; Florian Orth; Tim Ramdane Cherif	12	ART Düsseldorf; Philipp Baar; Andreas Straßner; Timo Göhler	20	LG Region Karlsruhe; Jannik Arbogast; Jan Lukas Becker; Frederik Unewisse	39
Mountain running	Maximilian Zeus; DJK Weiden	57:06 min	Benedikt Hoffmann; TSG 1845 Heilbronn	58:10 min	Marcel Krieghoff; GuthsMuths-Rennsteiglaufverein	58:28 min
Mountain running team	SSC Hanau-Rodenbach I Aaron Bienenfeld; Thomas Seibert; Jörn Harland	3:07:10 h	LG Brandenkopf; Bruno Schumi; Timo Zeiler; Ulrich Benz	3:08:26 h	SSC Hanau-Rodenbach II; Julius Hild; Ulrich Steidl; Lukas Abele	3:13:47 h

=== Women ===
Event	Gold		Silver		Bronze	
100 metres	Gina Lückenkemper; LG Olympia Dortmund	11.10	Rebekka Haase; LV 90 Erzgebirge	11.22	Tatjana Pinto; LC Paderborn	11.27
200 metres	Laura Müller; LC Rehlingen	22.65	Rebekka Haase; LV 90 Erzgebirge	22.88	Nadine Gonska; MTG Mannheim	22.93
400 metres	Ruth Spelmeyer; VfL Oldenburg	51.84	Svea Köhrbrück; SCC Berlin	52.76	Lara Hoffmann; LT DSHS Köln	52.84
800 metres	Christina Hering; LG Stadtwerke München	2:04.05 min	Tanja Spill; LAV Bayer Uerdingen/Dormagen	2:05.37 min	Mareen Kalis; LG Stadtwerke München	2:06.29 min
1500 metres	Konstanze Klosterhalfen; TSV Bayer 04 Leverkusen	3:59.58 min CR	Diana Sujew; Eintracht Frankfurt	4:10.71 min	Julia Kick; LG Telis Finanz Regensburg	4:10.90 min
5000 metres	Gesa Felicitas Krause; Silvesterlauf Trier	16:20.10 min	Hanna Klein; SG Schorndorf 1846	16:20.24 min	Corinna Harrer; LG Telis Finanz Regensburg	16:27.34 min
10,000 metres	Sabrina Mockenhaupt; LT Haspa Marathon Hamburg	33:08.42 min	Corinna Harrer; LG Telis Finanz Regensburg	34:12.64 min	Thea Heim; LG Telis Finanz Regensburg	34:34.75 min
10K run	Sabrina Mockenhaupt; LT Haspa Marathon Hamburg	33:38 min	Anna Hahner run2sky.com	33:45 min	Corinna Harrer; LG Telis Finanz Regensburg	33:48 min
10K run team	LG Telis Finanz Regensburg; Corinna Harrer; Franziska Reng; Thea Heim	1:42:00 h	LT Haspa Marathon Hamburg; Sabrina Mockenhaupt; Jana Sussmann; Mona Stockhecke	1:42:52 h	LAC Quelle Fürth; Jannika John; Gesa Bohn; Rebecca Robisch	1:45:10 h
Half marathon	Sabrina Mockenhaupt; LT Haspa Marathon Hamburg	1:10:54 h	Anja Scherl; LG Telis Finanz Regensburg	1:11:10 h	Corinna Harrer; LG Telis Finanz Regensburg	1:14:28 h
Half marathon team	LG Telis Finanz Regensburg I Anja Scherl; Corinna Harrer; Thea Heim	3:40:48 h	LG Telis Finanz Regensburg II; Miriam Dattke; Cornelia Griesche; Julia Galuschka	3:52:35 h	LAC Quelle Fürth; Gesa Bohn; Domenika Mayer; Tabea Haug	3:55:35 h
Marathon	Katharina Heinig; LG Eintracht Frankfurt	2:29:29 h	Fate Tola; LG Braunschweig	2:30:12 h	Laura Hottenrott; GSV Eintracht Baunatal	2:34:43 h
Marathon team	Hamburger Laufladen; Annika Krull; Jana Baum; Mareile Kitzel	8:45:50 h	Spiridon Frankfurt; Tania Moser; Hanna Rühl; Friederike Schoppe	9:02:02 h	PSV Grün-Weiß Kassel; Sandra Morchner; Anna Starostzik; Ursula Henning	9:03:23 h
100 kilometres	Nele Alder-Baerens; Ultra SC Marburg	7:35:37 h	Rebecca Walter; LG Nord Berlin Ultrateam	8:46:49 h	Sandra Fätsch; TSV 1886 Kandel	9:11:28 h
100 kilometres team	LG Nord Berlin; Rebecca Walter; Annette Müller; Patricia Rolle		Only one team finished			
100 m hurdles	Pamela Dutkiewicz; TV Wattenscheid 01	12.82	Ricarda Lobe; MTG Mannheim	13.09	Franziska Hofmann; LAC Erdgas Chemnitz	13.13
400 m hurdles	Djamila Böhm; ART Düsseldorf	56.92	Laura Nürnberger; TV Gladbeck 1912	58.10	Christine Salterberg; LT DSHS Köln	58.14
3000 m s'chase	Gesa Felicitas Krause; Silvesterlauf Trier	9:25.81 min CR	Jana Sussmann; LT Haspa Marathon Hamburg	9:57.59 min	Cornelia Griesche; LG Telis Finanz Regensburg	10:12.59 min
4 × 100 m relay	MTG Mannheim; Ricarda Lobe; Alexandra Burghardt; Nadine Gonska; Yasmin Kwadwo	42.97	LG Olympia Dortmund; Nina Raun; Marilena Scharff; Gina Lückenkemper; Johanna Marie Bechthold	43.87	TV Wattenscheid 01; Monika Zapalska; Keshia Kwadwo; Maike Schachtschneider; Pamela Dutkiewicz	44.13
4 × 400 m relay	LT DSHS Köln; Nelly Schmidt; Felicitas Ulmer; Lena Naumann; Lara Hoffmann	3:35.12	TSV Bayer 04 Leverkusen; Mareike Arndt; Tabea Marie Kempe; Rebekka Ackers; Carolin Walter	3:37.46	SCC Berlin; Hendrikje Richter; Svea Köhrbrück; Franziska Kindt; Alena Gerken	3:37.79
3 × 800 m relay	TSV Bayer 04 Leverkusen; Rebekka Ackers; Lena Klaassen; Carolin Walter	6:17.87 min	LG Stadtwerke München; Christine Gess; Mareen Kalis; Katharina Trost	6:19.49 min	LG Telis Finanz Regensburg; Mares-Elaine Strempler; Stella Kubasch; Maren Orth	6:28.26 min
5000 m walk	Teresa Zurek; SC Potsdam	23:43.16 min	Bianca Schenker; LG Vogtland	24:41.85 min	Julia Richter; SC Potsdam	24:55.02 min
20 km walk	Emilia Lehmeyer; Polizei SV Berlin	1:36:20 h	Saskia Feige; SC Potsdam	1:37:14 h	Kathrin Schulze; ASV Erfurt	1:48:43 h
20 km walk	TV Groß-Gerau; Brigitte Patrzalek; Monika Müller; Margarete Molter	7:31:52 h	Only one team finished			
High jump	Marie-Laurence Jungfleisch; VfB Stuttgart	1.94 m	Jossie Graumann; LG Nord Berlin	1.90 m	Laura Gröll; LG Eckental; Mareike Max; SV Werder Bremen	1.80 m
Pole vault	Lisa Ryzih; ABC Ludwigshafen	4.70 m	Silke Spiegelburg; TSV Bayer 04 Leverkusen	4.55 m	Friedelinde Petershofen; SC Potsdam	4.55 m
Long jump	Claudia Salman-Rath; Eintracht Frankfurt	6.72 m	Alexandra Wester; ASV Köln	6.71 m	Malaika Mihambo; LG Kurpfalz	6.62 m
Triple jump	Kristin Gierisch; LAC Erdgas Chemnitz	14.40 m	Neele Eckhardt; LG Göttingen	14.02 m	Birte Damerius; TSV Rudow	13.39 m
Shot put	Sara Gambetta; SC DHfK Leipzig	17.38 m	Josephine Terlecki; SV Halle	16.89 m	Alina Kenzel; VfL Waiblingen	16.76 m
Discus throw	Julia Harting; SCC Berlin	63.63 m	Anna Rüh; SC Magdeburg	62.17 m	Claudine Vita; SC Neubrandenburg	61.56 m
Hammer throw	Carolin Paesler; Eintracht Frankfurt	69.51 m	Kathrin Klaas; Eintracht Frankfurt	68.50 m	Sophie Gimmler; LC Rehlingen	65.48 m
Javelin throw	Katharina Molitor; TSV Bayer 04 Leverkusen	61.16 m	Christin Hussong; LAZ Zweibrücken	59.54 m	Sarah Leidl; 1.FC Passau	51.35 m
Heptathlon	Mareike Arndt; TSV Bayer 04 Leverkusen	6000 pts	Kira Biesenbach; TSV Bayer 04 Leverkusen	5153 pts	Malin Lobitz; Troisdorfer LG	5062 pts
Heptathlon	TSV Bayer 04 Leverkusen; Mareike Arndt; Kira Biesenbach; Maria-Lisa Michalsky	15.804 pts	TuS Metzingen; Sophie Hamann; Leonie Frank; Hanna Schrödersecker	14.641 pts	LT DSHS Köln; Laura Voß; Claudia Mieke; Carlotta Schraub	14.277 pts
Cross country – 5.84 km	Alina Reh; SSV Ulm 1846	19:40 min	Fabienne Amrhein; MTG Mannheim	20:04 min	Anna Gehring; Sport-Club Itzehoe	20:13 min
Cross country team	Lauf Team Haspa Marathon Hamburg; Sabrina Mockenhaupt; Jana Sussmann; Tabea Themann	18	LG Telis Finanz Regensburg; Maren Kock; Corinna Harrer; Cornelia Griesche	38	LG Nord Berlin; Caterina Granz; Deborah Schöneborn; Rabea Schöneborn	38
Mountain running	Sarah Kistner; MTV Kronberg	1:06:17 h	Gesa Bohn; LAC Quelle Fürth	1:10:44 h	Julia Belger; OSC Löbau	1:11:27 h
Mountain running team	LAC Quelle Fürth; Gesa Bohn; Lisa Wirth; Hannah Kadner	3:39:34 h	Ski-Club Gaißach; Regina Danner; Heidi Danner; Gerdi Schmiederer	4:01:47 h	ASC Darmstadt; Simone Raatz; Alexandra Rechel; Carin Irina Schmidt	4:03:06 h
