= Cologne Marathon =

Annual race in Germany held since 1997

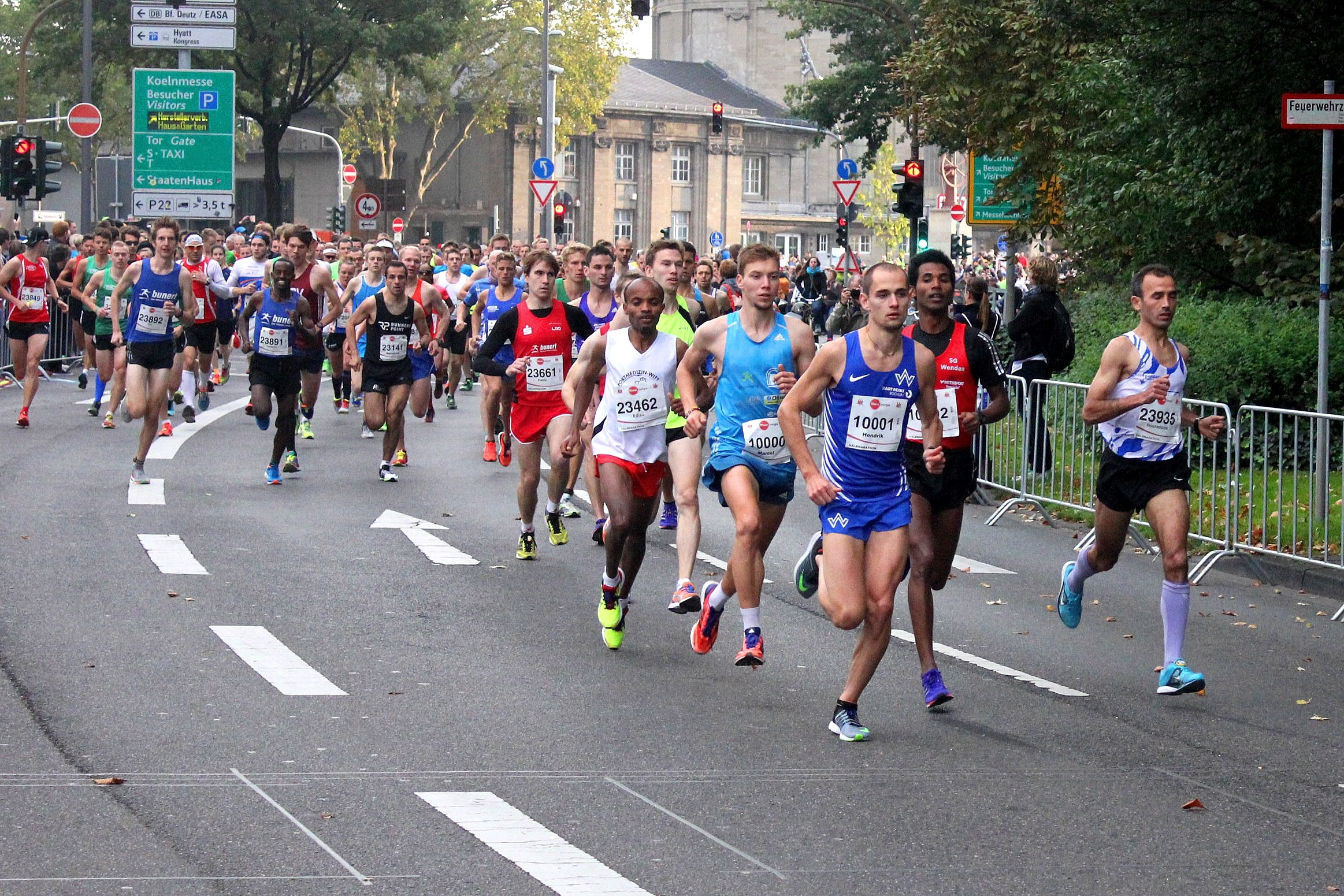
- Exiting Ottoplatz shortly after the start in 2015
- Date: October
- Location: Cologne, Germany
- Event type: Road
- Distance: Marathon
- Primary sponsor: Generali
- Established: 1997 (29 years ago)
- Course records: Marathon: Men: 2:07:37 (2012) (Kenya) Alfred Kering; Women: 2:25:34 (2012) (Kenya) Helena Kirop; Half Marathon: Men: 1:03:00 (2010) (Kenya) Leonard Langat; Women: 1:08:51 (2008) (Germany) Sabrina Mockenhaupt
- Website: Official website
- Participants: 4,379 (2019)

The Cologne Marathon (Köln-Marathon) is an annual marathon held in Cologne, Germany. Since October 1997 the marathon has been held annually in early October, except for 2004, 2005 and 2014 when it was held in late September.

== History ==
The inaugural race took place on 5 October 1997 as the "Ford Cologne Marathon" (German: Ford Köln-Marathon) with at least 13,000 registered runners, a world record for inaugural marathons at the time.

The 2020 in-person edition of the race was cancelled due to the coronavirus pandemic, with all registrants given the option of obtaining a refund (minus an administration fee).

== Course ==
External images
- Course map of full marathon in 1997
- Course map of full marathon in 2019

Since 2013 the course starts at Ottoplatz in Deutz and leads the runners through the city of Cologne and finishes at Komödienstraße beneath the Cologne Cathedral.

The marathon time limit is 6 hours.

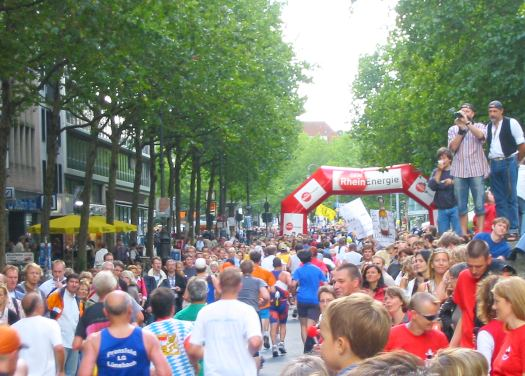
Running through a crowd in 2004

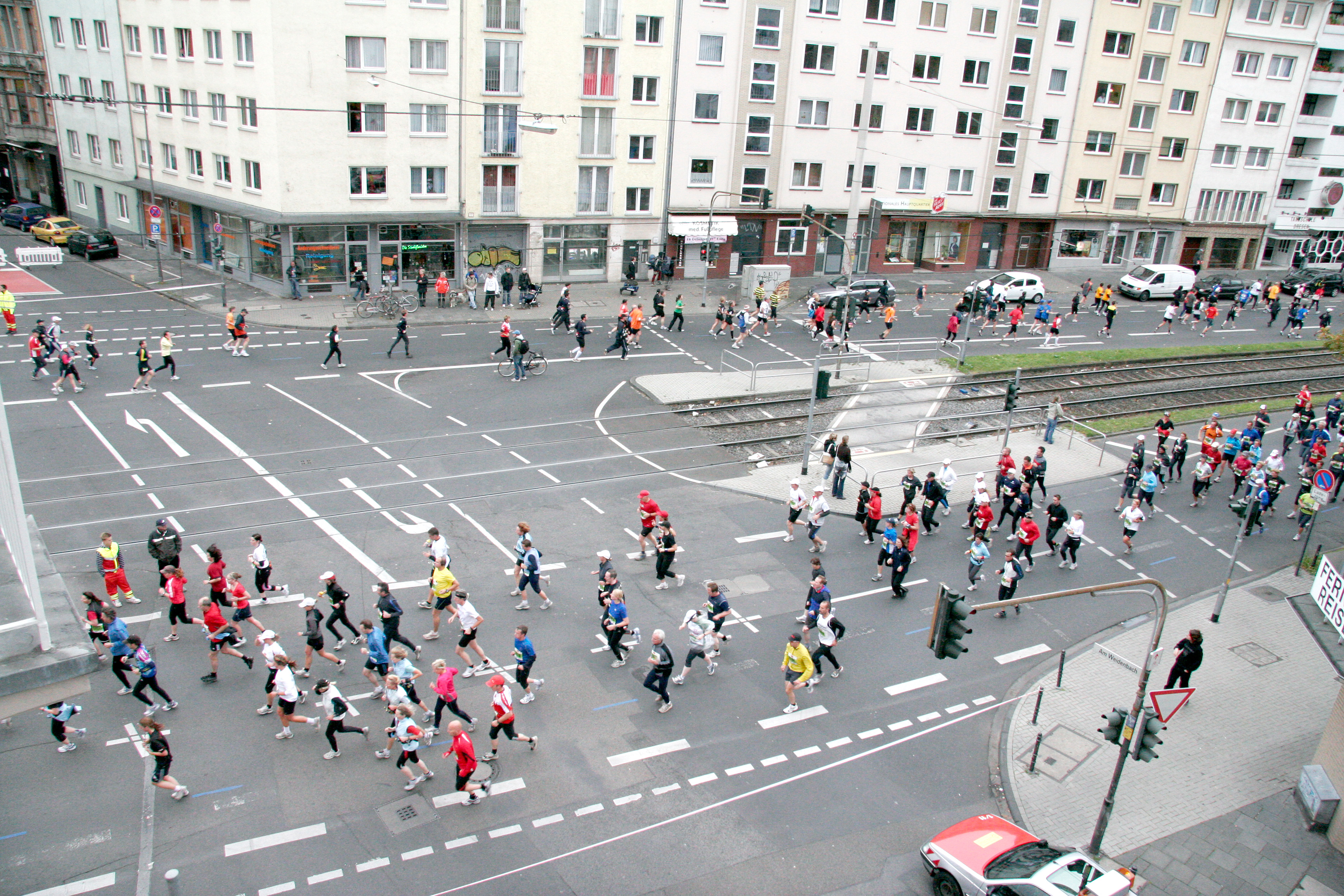
Passing runners on Salierring, 2008

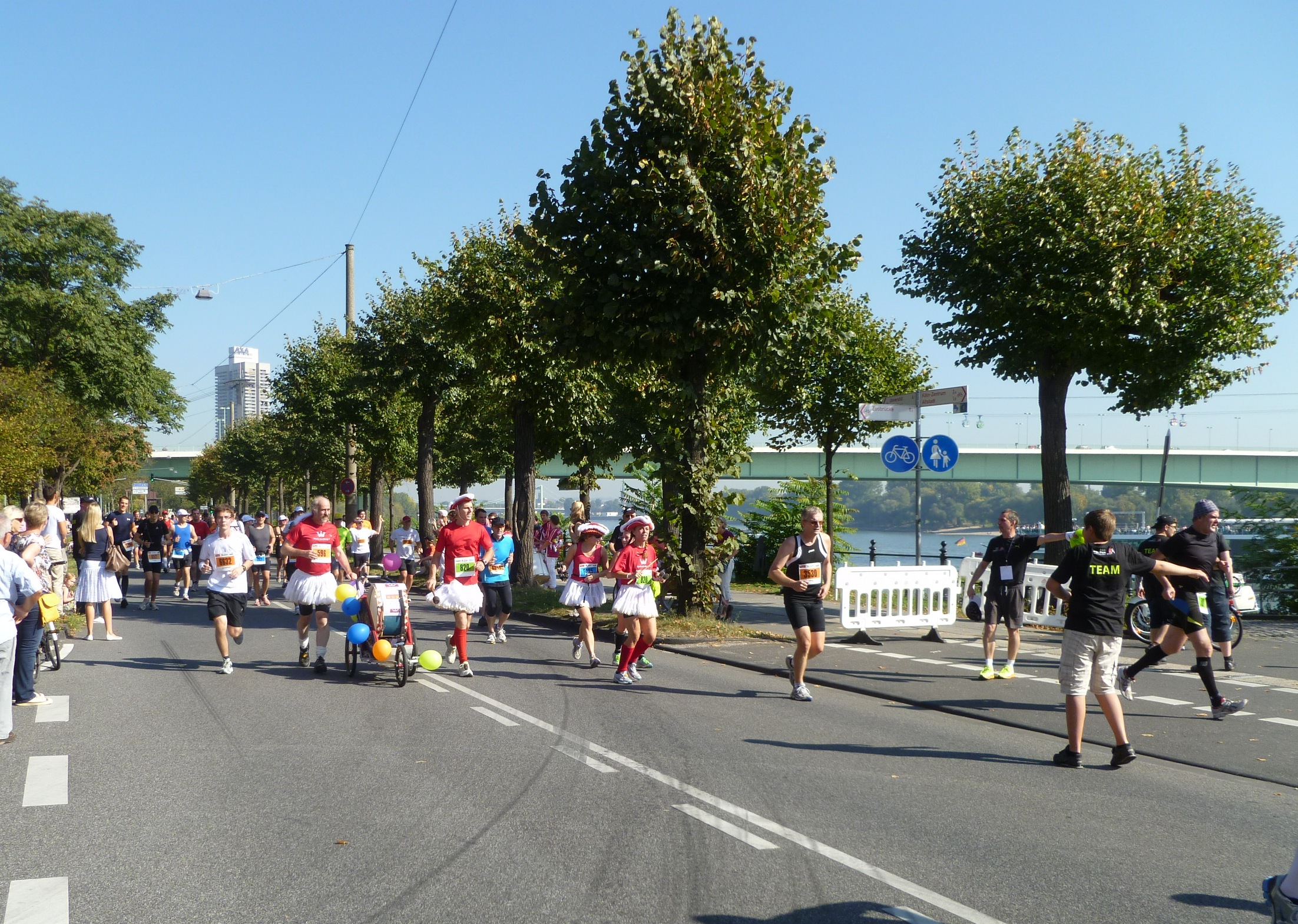
Running along the Rhine on Konrad-Adenauer-Ufer, with Colonia-Haus and the Zoo Bridge visible in the background, 2011

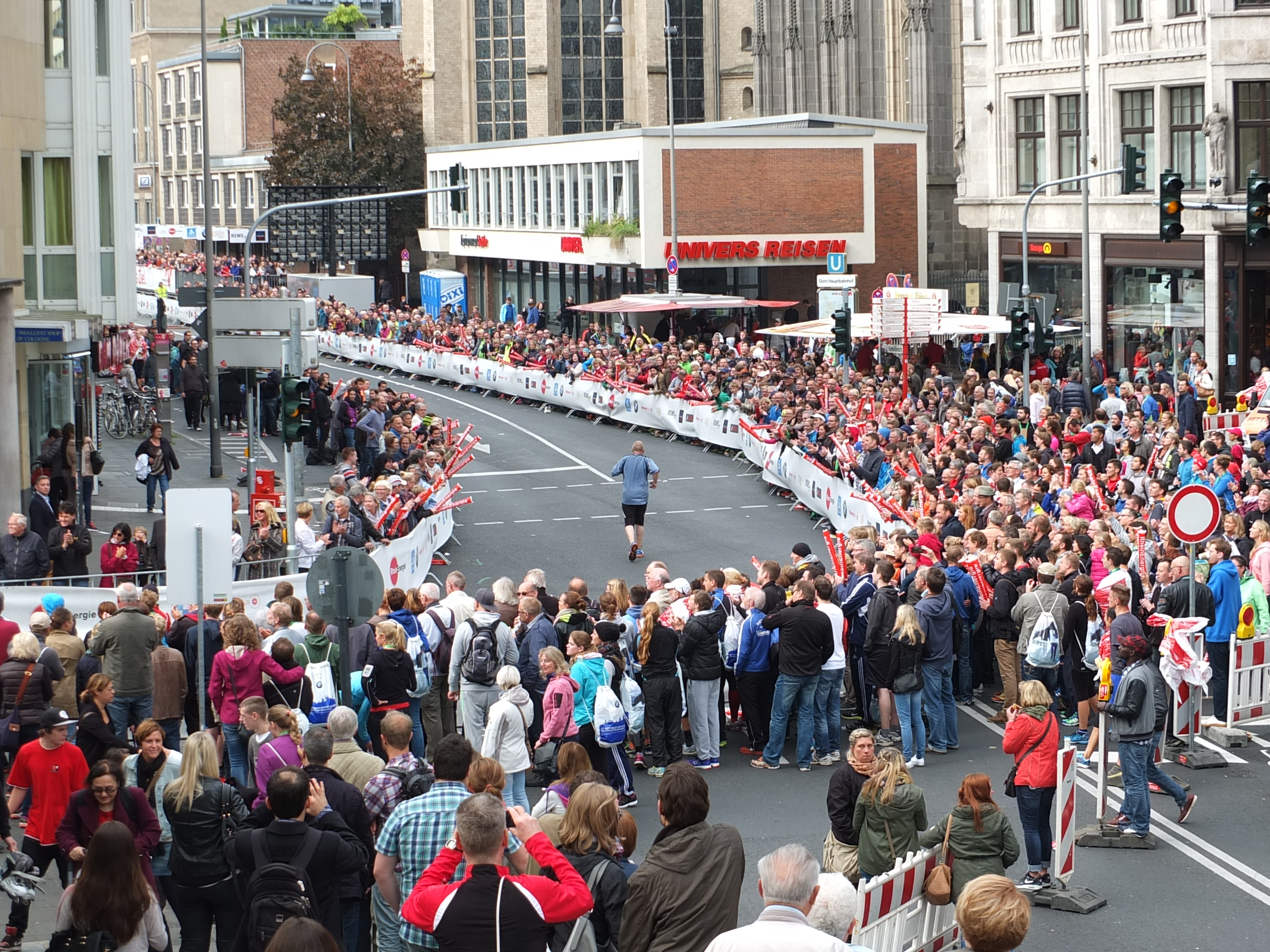
Approaching the finish in 2015

== Events and categories ==
From the beginning there has also been a contest for inline skaters. They start ahead of the runners and try to finish the course in the time limit for skaters, which is 2:30 hours. This competition as well as all others including inline skates were ultimately held in 2013.

Since 1998 there has also been a contest for handcyclists.

In the last years it has been more and more difficult to utilize the starting field because of diverse interests. To countervail, the management of the marathon created new events and contests, which all take place at the same course on the same day.

Here is a list of all competitions:

- Marathon – 42.195 kilometres (26 miles 385 yards)
- Half marathon – 21.0975 kilometres (13 miles 192.5 yards)
- Inline marathon – for skaters
- Handcyclist marathon
- Run 63 km (39 mi) – a full marathon plus a half marathon
- Run&Skate 63 km (39 mi) – first run a half marathon and afterwards skate a complete marathon
- Run&Skate 84 km (52 mi) – first skate, and then run with the peloton
- 105 km (65 mi) of Cologne – run 21 km (13 mi) (half marathon), skate 42 km (26 mi), run 42 km (26 mi)
- School Relay – schools may set up their own relay teams, the handover is at fixed points
- Cultural Relay – any group of people that is committed to any kind of cultural activity (e.g. carnival groups), may set up relay teams (again with fixed handovers). These teams are often dressed up specially.

== Winners ==
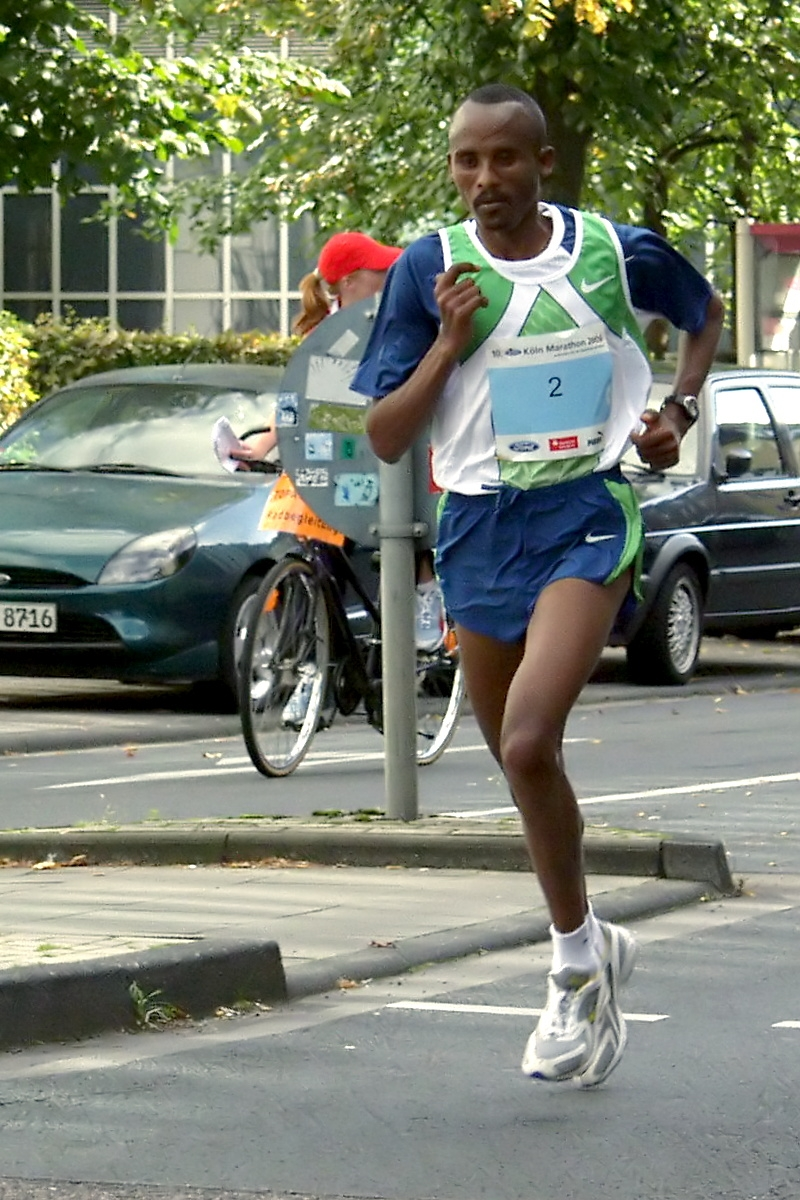
The 2006 winner Teferi Wodajo at the midpoint of the race

Key: Course record (in bold)

=== Marathon ===
| Ed. | Year | Men's winner | Time | Women's winner | Time | Rf. |
|---|---|---|---|---|---|---|
| 1 | 1997 | Stephan Freigang (GER) | 2:12:00 | Angelina Kanana (KEN) | 2:27:27 | |
| 2 | 1998 | Carsten Eich (GER) | 2:10:57 | Małgorzata Sobańska (POL) | 2:29:39 | |
| 3 | 1999 | Benson Lokorwa (KEN) | 2:11:51 | Elżbieta Jarosz (POL) | 2:34:23 | |
| 4 | 2000 | Benson Lokorwa (KEN) | 2:15:51 | Małgorzata Sobańska (POL) | 2:28:42 | |
| 5 | 2001 | Simon Lopuyet (KEN) | 2:11:57 | Judith Kiplimo (KEN) | 2:31:08 | |
| 6 | 2002 | Ernest Kipyego (KEN) | 2:10:52 | Claudia Dreher (GER) | 2:31:29 | |
| 7 | 2003 | Benjamin Rotich (KEN) | 2:12:05 | Tegla Loroupe (KEN) | 2:33:48 | |
| 8 | 2004 | James Rotich (KEN) | 2:10:22 | Claudia Dreher (GER) | 2:32:06 | |
| 9 | 2005 | Joseph Kadon (KEN) | 2:11:55 | Claudia Dreher (GER) | 2:31:42 | |
| 10 | 2006 | Tereje Wodajo (ETH) | 2:11:24 | Luminita Zaituc (GER) | 2:28:30 | |
| 11 | 2007 | Daniel Too (KEN) | 2:11:05 | Sabrina Mockenhaupt (GER) | 2:29:33 | |
| 12 | 2008 | Sammy Kurgat (KEN) | 2:10:03 | Robe Tola (ETH) | 2:29:39 | |
| 13 | 2009 | Evans Ruto (KEN) | 2:08:36 | Sabrina Mockenhaupt (GER) | 2:30:12 | |
| 14 | 2010 | Francis Bowen (KEN) | 2:14:15 | Katharina Heinig (GER) | 2:46:05 | |
| 15 | 2011 | Samson Barmao (KEN) | 2:08:56 | Mekuria Aberume (ETH) | 2:32:24 | |
| 16 | 2012 | Alfred Kering (KEN) | **2:07:37** | Helena Kirop (KEN) | **2:25:34** | |
| 17 | 2013 | Nicholas Chelimo (KEN) | 2:09:45 | Janet Rono (KEN) | 2:28:36 | |
| 18 | 2014 | Anthony Maritim (KEN) | 2:10:26 | Shasho Insermu (ETH) | 2:35:36 | |
| 19 | 2015 | Benson Waweru (KEN) | 2:16:03 | Gelane Senbete (KEN) | 2:37:33 | |
| 20 | 2016 | Raymond Choge (KEN) | 2:08:39 | Bornes Kitur (KEN) | 2:32:16 | |
| 21 | 2017 | Hendrik Pfeiffer (GER) | 2:13:42 | Rebecca Robisch (GER) | 2:43:02 | |
| 22 | 2018 | Tobias Blum (GER) | 2:16:57 | Rebecca Robisch (GER) | 2:46:03 | |
| 23 | 2019 | Hendrik Pfeiffer (GER) | 2:15:19 | Debbie Schöneborn (GER) | 2:31:18 | |
| | 2020 | cancelled due to coronavirus pandemic | | | | |
| | 2021 | cancelled due to coronavirus pandemic | | | | |
| 24 | 2022 | Tobias Blum (GER) | 2:16:25 | Sabine Burgdorf (GER) | 2:40:40 | |
| 25 | 2023 | Amos Changwony (KEN) | 2:14:43 | Esther Jacobitz (GER) | 2:37:00 | |
| 26 | 2024 | Tadesse Mengistie (ETH) | 2:12:37 | Zinash Mekonnen (ETH) | 2:29:41 | |

=== Half marathon ===
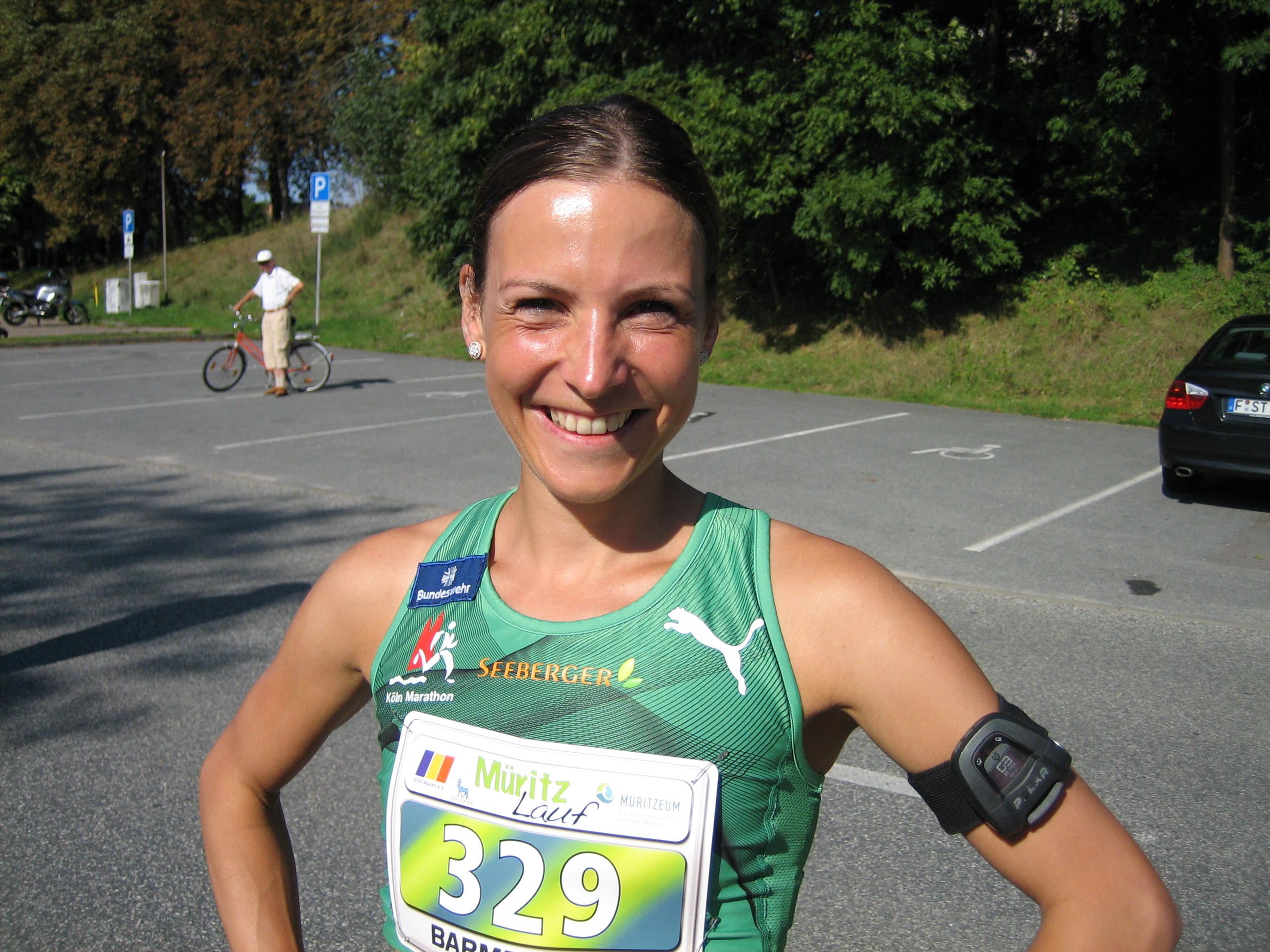
Sabrina Mockenhaupt is a two-time winner of the marathon and four-time winner of the half marathon.

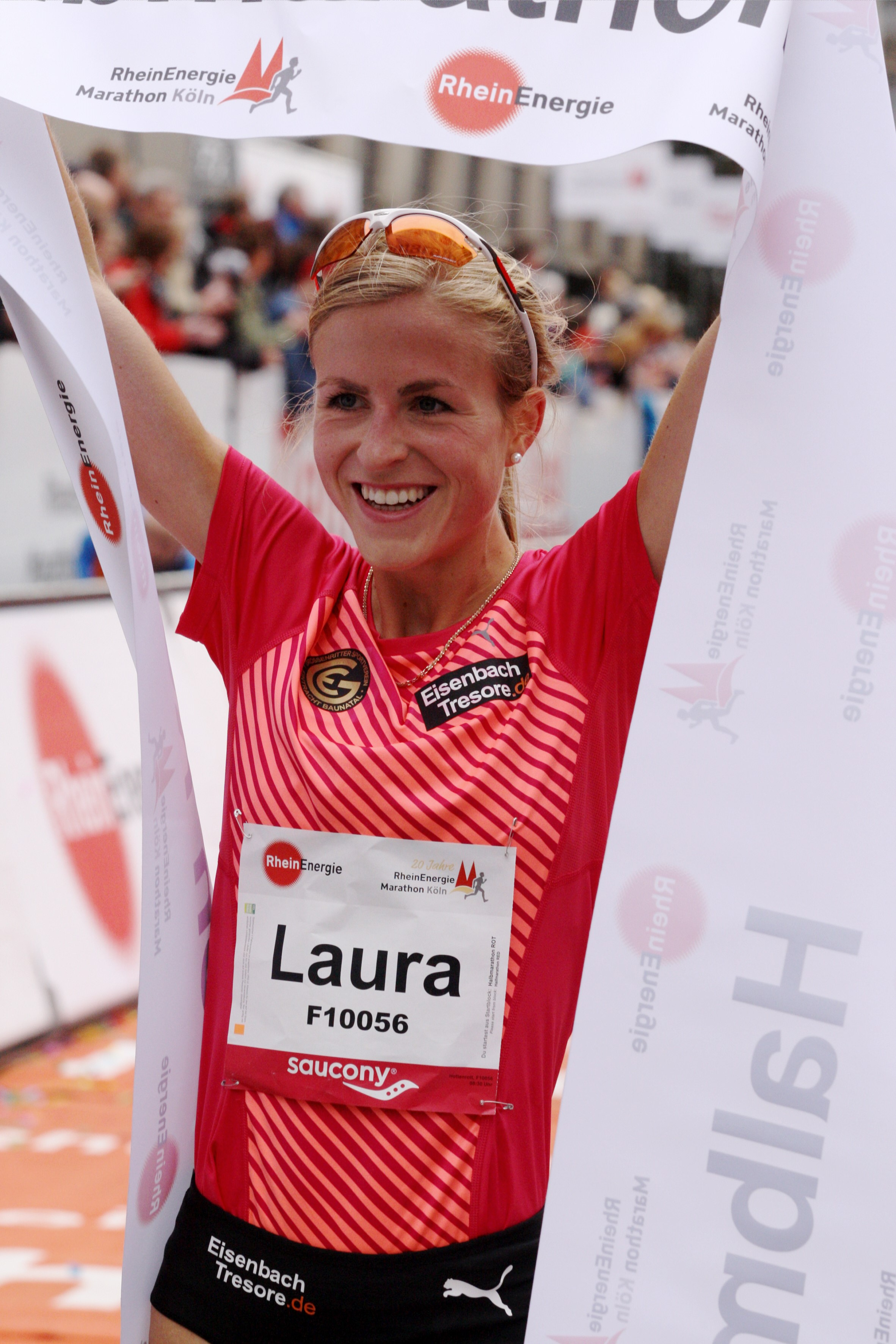
Laura Hottenrott after winning the half marathon in 2016

| Year | Men's winner | Time | Women's winner | Time | Rf. |
|---|---|---|---|---|---|
| 2006 | Pascal Meissner (GER) | 1:11:43 | Irina Mikitenko (GER) | 1:10:09 | |
| 2007 | Lars Haferkamp (GER) | 1:07:33 | Luminita Zaituc (GER) | 1:11:54 | |
| 2008 | Mehmet Ali Akbas (TUR) | 1:08:08 | Sabrina Mockenhaupt (GER) | **1:08:51** | |
| 2009 | Maciek Miereczko (POL) | 1:07:11 | Julia Viellehner (GER) | 1:14:34 | |
| 2010 | Leonard Langat (KEN) | **1:03:00** | Simret Restle (GER) | 1:12:56 | |
| 2011 | Vitaliy Rybak (UKR) | 1:05:26 | Sabrina Mockenhaupt (GER) | 1:10:31 | |
| 2012 | Wilson Chemweno (KEN) | 1:07:20 | Sabrina Mockenhaupt (GER) | 1:16:43 | |
| 2013 | Hendrik Pfeiffer (GER) | 1:05:11 | Sabrina Mockenhaupt (GER) | 1:10:54 | |
| 2014 | Melaku Belachew (ETH) | 1:03:26 | Christl Dörschel (GER) | 1:17:42 | |
| 2015 | Hendrik Pfeiffer (GER) | 1:03:42 | Simret Restle (GER) | 1:12:28 | |
| 2016 | Tom Gröschel (GER) | 1:04:49 | Laura Hottenrott (GER) | 1:15:11 | |
| 2017 | Tobias Blum (GER) | 1:05:42 | Sabrina Mockenhaupt (GER) | 1:12:05 | |
| 2018 | Karol Grunenberg (GER) | 1:05:20 | Alina Reh (GER) | 1:09:31 | |
| 2019 | Amanal Petros (GER) | 1:05:43 | Katja Fischer (GER) | 1:15:18 | |
| 2020 | cancelled due to coronavirus pandemic | | | | |
| 2021 | cancelled due to coronavirus pandemic | | | | |
| 2022 | Tom Förster (GER) | 1:04:50 | Esther Jacobitz (GER) | 1:15:53 | |
| 2023 | Tom Förster (GER) | 1:04:11 | Mia Jurenka (GER) | 1:12:46 | |
| 2024 | Tom Förster (GER) | 1:04:36 | Esther Pfeiffer (GER) | 1:09:49 | |

== Development of starting field ==
Records

| Date | finished | | | fraction | |
| | Total | Men | Women | Men | Women |
|---|---|---|---|---|---|
| 5 October 1997 | 11,221 | 9,571 | 1,650 | 85% | 15% |
| 11 October 1998 | 8,572 | 7,408 | 1,164 | 86% | 14% |
| 3 October 1999 | 10,896 | 9,217 | 1,679 | 85% | 15% |
| 1 October 2000 | 12,720 | 10,799 | 1,921 | 85% | 15% |
| 7 October 2001 | 13,056 | 10,974 | 2,082 | 84% | 16% |
| 6 October 2002 | 14,224 | 11,775 | 2,449 | 83% | 17% |
| 5 October 2003 | 13,867 | 11,452 | 2,415 | 83% | 17% |
| 12 September 2004 | 12,960 | 10,646 | 2,314 | 82% | 18% |
| 11 September 2005 | 10,856 | 8,859 | 2,006 | 82% | 18% |
| 8 October 2006 | 10,469 | 8,412 | 2,057 | 80% | 20% |
| 7 October 2007 | 9,680 | 7,824 | 1,866 | 81% | 19% |
| 5 October 2008 | 7,553 | 6,131 | 1,422 | 81% | 19% |
| 4 October 2009 | 7,847 | 6,370 | 1,477 | 81% | 19% |
| 3 October 2010 | 5,468 | 4,414 | 1,054 | 81% | 19% |
| 2 October 2011 | 5,469 | 4,382 | 1,087 | 80% | 20% |
| 14 October 2012 | 4,807 | 3,953 | 855 | 82% | 18% |
| 13 October 2013 | 5,132 | 4,116 | 1,016 | 80% | 20% |
