= Hahner =

Hahner is a German surname. Notable people with the surname include:

- Anna Hahner (born 1989), German long-distance runner
- Lisa Hahner (born 1989), German long-distance runner, twin sister of Anna
