= Claudia Dreher =

German long-distance runner (born 1971)

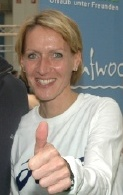
- Dreher in 2009

Personal information
- Born: 2 May 1971 (age 55) Magdeburg, East Germany

Sport
- Sport: Marathon running

Claudia Dreher (born 2 May 1971) is a German long-distance runner. She competed for her native country at the 2000 Summer Olympics in Sydney, Australia.

== Achievements ==
| Year | Competition | Venue | Position | Event | Notes |
Representing East Germany
| 1990 | World Junior Championships | Plovdiv, Bulgaria | 5th | 10,000m | 34:11.20 |
Representing Germany
| 1997 | Houston Marathon | Houston, United States | 1st | Marathon | 2:36:13 |
| 1997 | Lisbon Marathon | Lisbon, Portugal | 1st | Marathon | 2:33:59 |
| 1998 | Frankfurt Marathon | Frankfurt, Germany | 3rd | Marathon | |
| 1998 | European Championships | Budapest, Hungary | 10th | Marathon | 2:31:10 |
| 1999 | Hannover Marathon | Hannover, Germany | 1st | Marathon | 2:27:55 |
| 1999 | World Championships | Seville, Spain | 9th | Marathon | 2:29:22 |
| 2000 | Olympic Games | Sydney, Australia | — | Marathon | DNS |
| 2001 | Lisbon Marathon | Lisbon, Portugal | 1st | Marathon | 2:31:01 |
| 2002 | Cologne Marathon | Cologne, Germany | 1st | Marathon | 2:31:29 |
| 2004 | Cologne Marathon | Cologne, Germany | 1st | Marathon | 2:32:06 |
| 2005 | Cologne Marathon | Cologne, Germany | 1st | Marathon | 2:31:42 |
| 2005 | Hamburg Marathon | Hamburg, Germany | 3rd | Marathon | 2:29:49 |
| 2006 | Frankfurt Marathon | Frankfurt, Germany | 4th | Marathon | 2:32:22 |
| 2006 | European Championships | Göteborg, Sweden | 11th | Marathon | 2:33:53 |
| 2007 | Hamburg Marathon | Hamburg, Germany | 8th | Marathon | 2:33:58 |
| 2008 | Tokyo Marathon | Tokyo, Japan | 1st | Marathon | 2:35:35 |

=== Personal bests ===
- Half marathon – 1:11:57 hrs (2004)
- Marathon – 2:27:55 hrs (1999)
