= Ernest Kipyego =

Kenyan marathon runner

Ernest Kipyego (born 6 October 1978) is a Kenyan marathon runner.

He has won several European marathon races, such as the 2000 Košice Peace Marathon, the 2002 Cologne Marathon (in a then-course record of 2:10:52 hours) and the 2005 Linz Marathon.

His personal best times are 1:01:58 hours in the half marathon, achieved in April 2005 in Berlin; and 2:09:55 hours in the marathon, achieved at the 2003 Eindhoven Marathon.
