= H.C. Andersen Marathon =

Marathon in Odense, Denmark

- Date: Late September
- Location: Odense, Denmark
- Event type: Road
- Distance: Marathon, Half marathon
- Established: 2000
- Course records: Men's: 2:10:37 (2012) (Kenya) Luka Chelimo; Women's: 2:30:49 (2019) (Kenya) Jerubet Perez
- Website: Official website
- Participants: 881 finishers (2021); 1,236 (2019)

The H.C. Andersen Marathon (HCA Marathon) is a marathon in Odense, Denmark, which was established in 2000. From 2006 onwards, the event has included a half marathon and from 2017 a 10K race "Run the last 10".

HCA Marathon is named after the Danish fairy-tale writer Hans Christian Andersen.

HCA Marathon was the world's fastest marathon in 2019. On average the runners finish the marathon in just 3:51:22 which is just 8 minutes 50 second a mile. HCA Marathon is also the marathon with the cleanest air in the world.

== Course ==
The race is held on a round course, starting and finishing at Odense Idrætspark. The course is run twice, and the finish is in the athletics stadium.

== Statistics ==
=== Course records ===
- Men: 2:10.37 Luka Chelimo (KEN), 2012
- Women: 2:30:48 Jerubet Perez (KEN), 2019

=== Winners ===
Date	Men's Winner	Nation	Time	Women's winner	Nation	Time
October 15, 2000	Daniel Cheribo	Kenya	2:14:17	Gitte Karlshøj	Denmark	2:35:39
October 14, 2001	Witalij Melzajew	Ukraine	2:18:14	Gitte Karlshøj	Denmark	2:32:41
October 13, 2002	Andrei Tarassow	Russia	2:20:59	Karina Szymańska	Poland	2:33:20
October 12, 2003	Alexei Chlochlow	Russia	2:19:33	Gitte Karlshøj	Denmark	2:34:57
October 10, 2004	Daniel Too	Kenya	2:13:57	Gitte Karlshøj	Denmark	2:45:46
September 25, 2005	Josephat Rop	Kenya	2:14:49	Irina Songerlainen	Russia	2:41:25
September 17, 2006	Daniel Too	Kenya	2:15:49	Lene Duus	Denmark	2:40:41
September 23, 2007	Jonah Kemboi	Kenya	2:15:05	Irina Songerlainen (2)	Russia	2:42:15
September 21, 2008	Benjamin Serem	Kenya	2:14:44	Tatjana Mironowa	Russia	2:42:00
September 20, 2009	Jonah Kemboi	Kenya	2:15:32	Gitte Karlshøj	Denmark	2:51:30
September 19, 2010	Raymond Kandie	Kenya	2:10.41	Sviatlana Kouhan	Belarus	2:33:18
September 23, 2012	Luka Chelimo	Kenya	2:10:37	Emely Chepkorir	Kenya	2:34:48
September 22, 2013	Julius Mutai	Kenya	2:15:12	Annemette Aagaard	Denmark	2:52:19
September 28, 2014	James Cheboi	Kenya	2:17:16	Hellen Kimutai	Kenya	2:40:50
October 4, 2015	Julius Karinga	Kenya	2:11:21	Mulunesh Zewdu	Ethiopia	2:34:10
October 2, 2016	Fikadu Debele	Ethiopia	2:15:21	Roza Dereje	Ethiopia	2:31:16
October 1, 2017	Paul Chege	Kenya	2:14:37	Louise Batting	Denmark	2:38:52
September 30, 2018	Paul Matheka	Kenya	2:13:18	Bulbula Abebech	Ethiopia	2:42:23
September 29, 2019	Meseret Aragaw	Ethiopia	2:16:27	Jerubet Perez	Kenya	2:30:48
September 26, 2021	Martin Olesen	Denmark	2:22:57	Lene Broberg	Denmark	2:56:05
September 25, 2022	Michael Fogh	Denmark	2:30:29	Charlotte Kjærulff	Denmark	3:00:38
September 24, 2023	Martin Olesen	Denmark	2:27:58	Line Askheim	Norway	2:53:21
September 29, 2024	Jonas Nielsen	Denmark	2:23:26	Bouchra Eriksen	Denmark	2:53:56
