= Elżbieta Jarosz =

Polish long-distance runner

Elżbieta Jarosz (born August 14, 1971) is a retired female long-distance runner from Poland. She won the 1999 edition of the Cologne Marathon, clocking 2:34:23 on October 3, 1999. She was the Polish national champion in the Half marathon in 1998 and the marathon in 2001.

== Achievements ==
Year	Competition	Venue	Position	Event	Notes
Representing Poland
1998	Frankfurt Marathon	Frankfurt, Germany	2nd	Marathon	2:31:58
1999	Cologne Marathon	Cologne, Germany	1st	Marathon	2:34:23
2000	Munich Marathon	Munich, Germany	1st	Marathon	2:37:34
2001	Dębno Marathon-Polish Championships	Dębno, Poland	1st	Marathon	2:37:02
2001	Twin Cities Marathon	Minneapolis–Saint Paul, USA	5th	Marathon	2:30:15

== Personal bests ==
- Half marathon – 1:15:04 hrs (2003)
- Marathon – 2:30:15 hrs (2001)
