= Daniel Too =

Kenyan long-distance runner

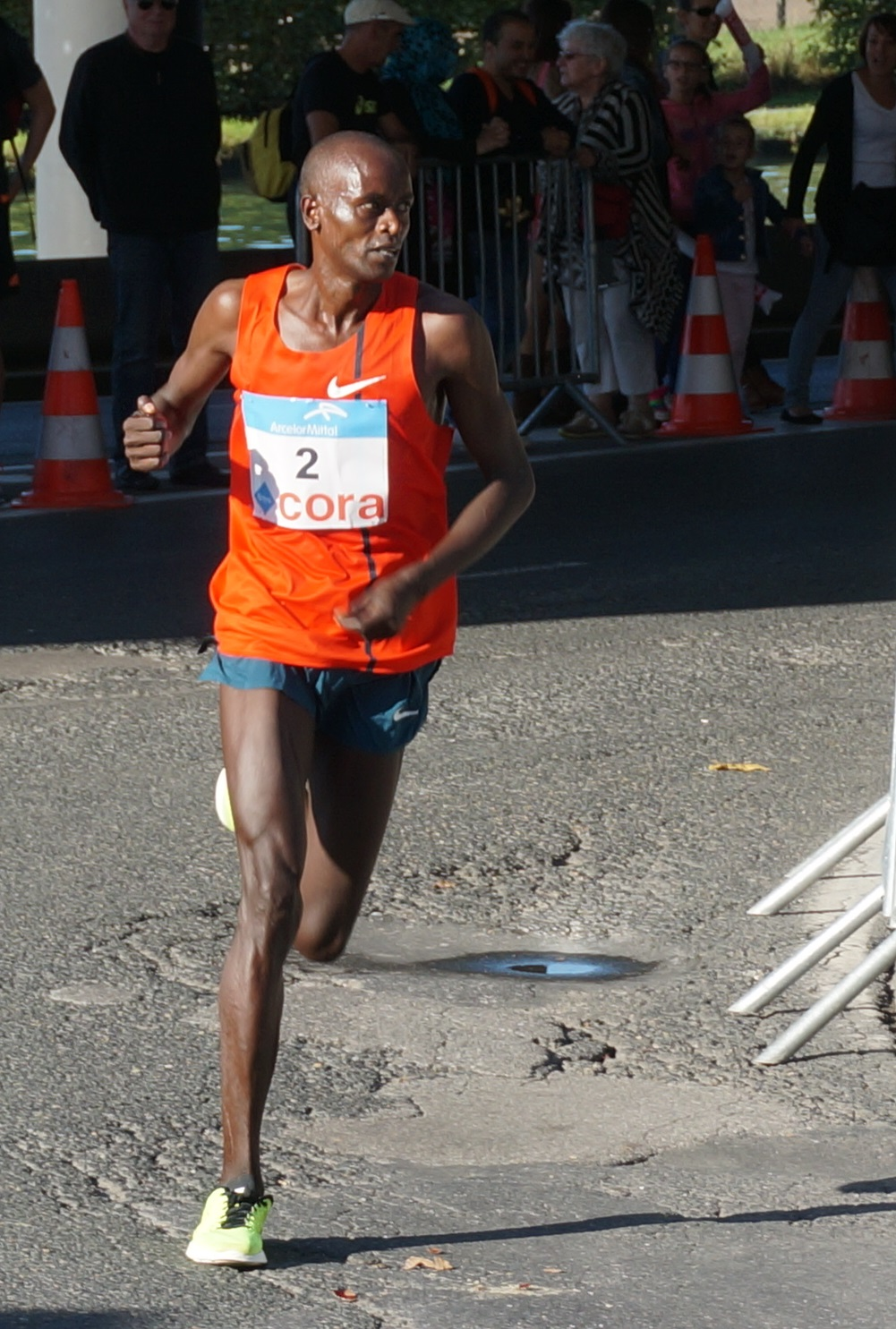
Marathon de Reims.

Daniel Kiprugut Too (born 25 April 1978) is a Kenyan marathon runner.

Too has won several European marathon races, such as the 2012 Milano City Marathon, the 2011 Ljubljana Marathon (course record), the 2007 Cologne Marathon and the 2004 and 2006 H.C. Andersen Marathon.

His personal best times are 1:02:16 hours in the half marathon, achieved in October 2010 in Nairobi; and 2:08:25 hours in the marathon, achieved at the 2011 Ljubljana Marathon.
