= Hendrik Pfeiffer =

German long-distance runner

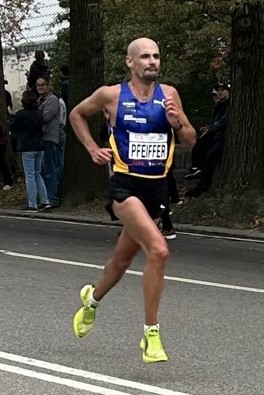
- Hendrik Pfeiffer near Mile 24 of the 2023 New York City Marathon

Personal information
- Nationality: German
- Born: 18 March 1993 (age 32)

Sport
- Sport: Track and Field
- Event(s): half marathon, marathon

Hendrik Pfeiffer (born 18 March 1993) is a German long-distance runner who competed at the 2020 Summer Games in the marathon.

== Career ==
Pfeiffer ran at the 2016 European Athletics Championships in Amsterdam but failed to finish the race as he had a heel injury. The heel injury also kept him out of the 2016 Summer Games. He was again selected for the 2018 European Athletics Championships but had to pull out due to injury problems.

He won the 2017 Cologne Marathon and at the Vivawest Marathon in Gelsenkirchen in 2018 Pfeiffer set a new world record for the fastest half marathon ever run in a suit. He ran it in 1:12.47 breaking the record by over five minutes. Pfeiffer was motivated to highlight the dual roles many athletes have to play of athlete and worker. Pfeiffer himself at the time was studying journalism at the Technical University of Dortmund and was a student trainee in the Corporate Communications Department in Duisburg.

Pfeiffer caught COVID-19 and his training was interrupted but was still selected to compete at the delayed 2020 Summer Games. On 23 February 2020, he had run 2:10.18 at the Seville Marathon to meet the qualifying standard.

He won the Hannover marathon in April 2022, which acted as the German national championships, finishing in a time of 2:10:59.

At the 2024 Houston Marathon he finished third with a personal best time of 2:07:14, which was the fourth fastest time ran by a German runner. He finished in seventh place at the 2024 London Marathon in April 2024, running a time of 2:10:00. In May 2024, he was selected for the 2024 European Athletics Championships in Rome.
