= Laura Hottenrott =

German long-distance runner (born 1992)

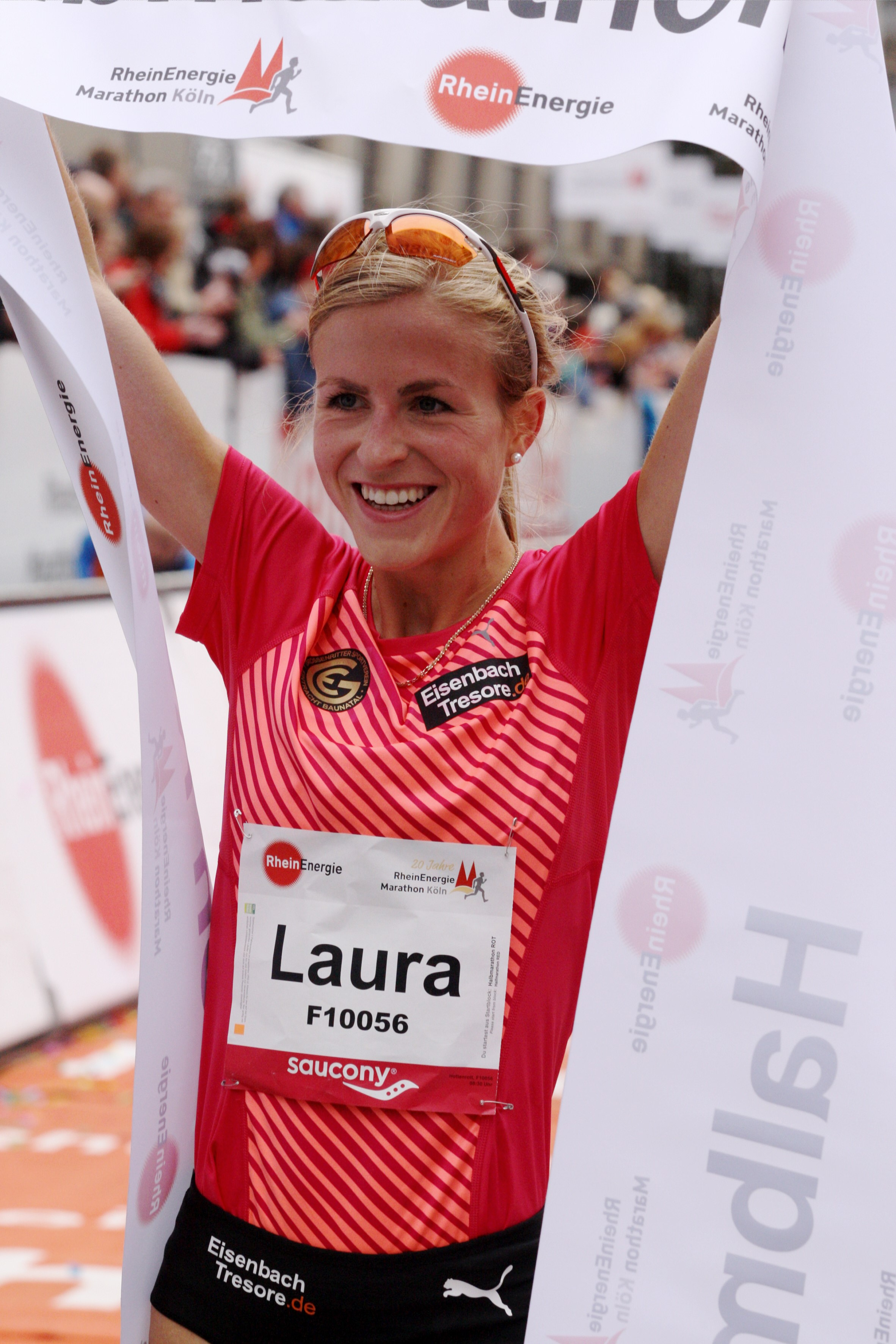
- Laura Hottenrott in 2017

Personal information
- Born: 14 May 1992 (age 34)

Sport
- Country: Germany
- Sport: Long-distance running
Medal record
Women's long-distance running
German Athletics Championships
Bronze medal – third place	2017 Erfurt	Marathon

Laura Hottenrott (born 14 May 1992) is a German long-distance runner. In 2020, she competed in the women's half marathon at the 2020 World Athletics Half Marathon Championships held in Gdynia, Poland.

In 2017, she won the bronze medal in the women's marathon at the 2017 German Athletics Championships. In 2018, she competed in the women's marathon at the 2018 European Athletics Championships held in Berlin, Germany. She did not finish her race.

At the World Mountain and Trail Championships in June 2023, she finished 4th Vertical competition and 2nd in the team classification together with Hanna Gröber, Laura Hampel, Domenika Meyer.

Her marathon P.R. of 2:24:32 was set at the 2023 Valencia Marathon.
