= Lisa Hahner =

German long-distance runner

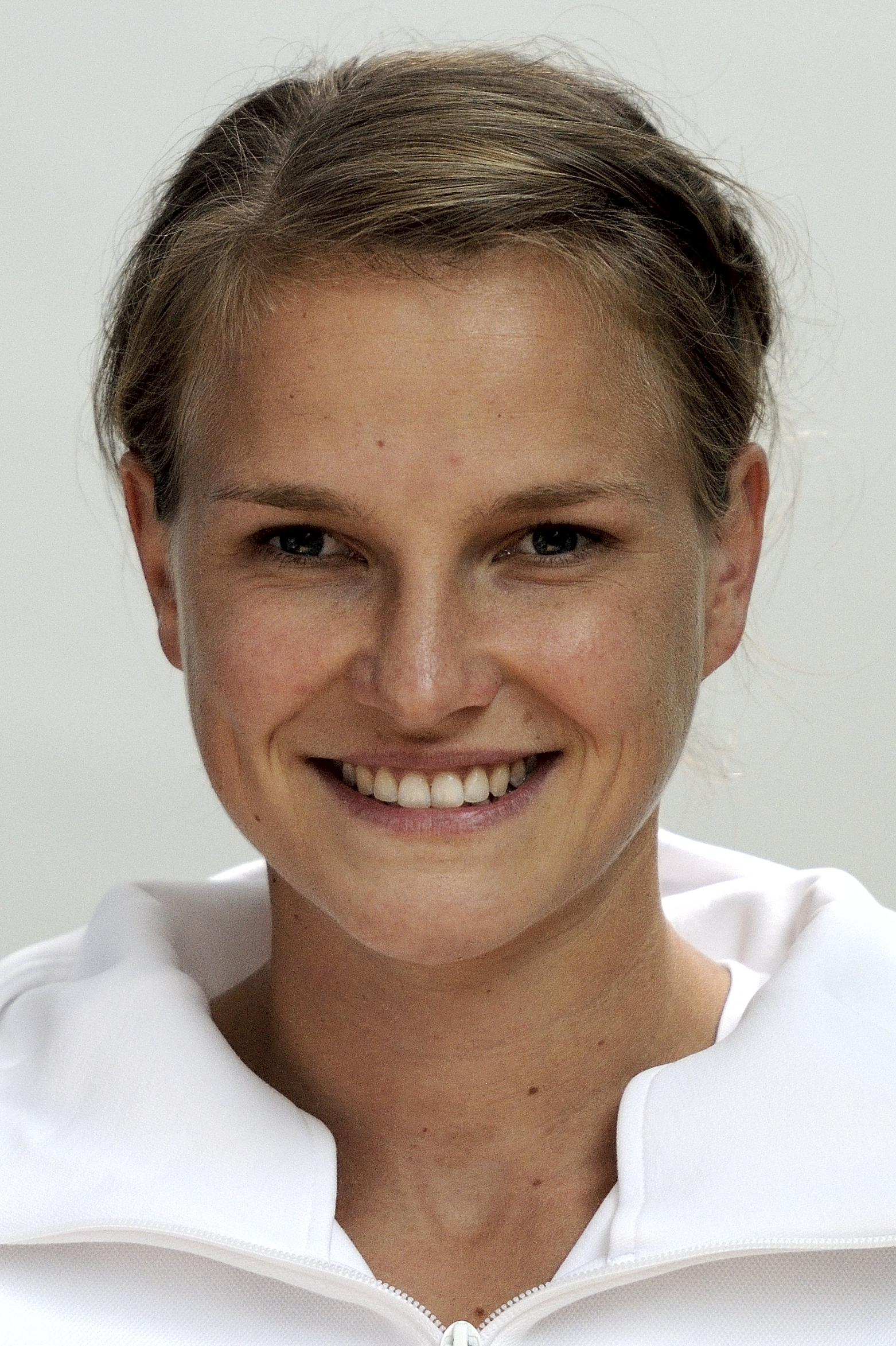
- Lisa Hahner in 2016

Personal information
- Nationality: German
- Born: 20 November 1989 (age 36)
- Height: 167 cm (5 ft 6 in)
- Weight: 50 kg (110 lb)

Sport
- Country: Germany
- Sport: Track and field
- Event: Marathon

Lisa Hahner (born 20 November 1989 in Hünfeld, Germany) is a German long-distance runner who specialises in the marathon.

== Life ==
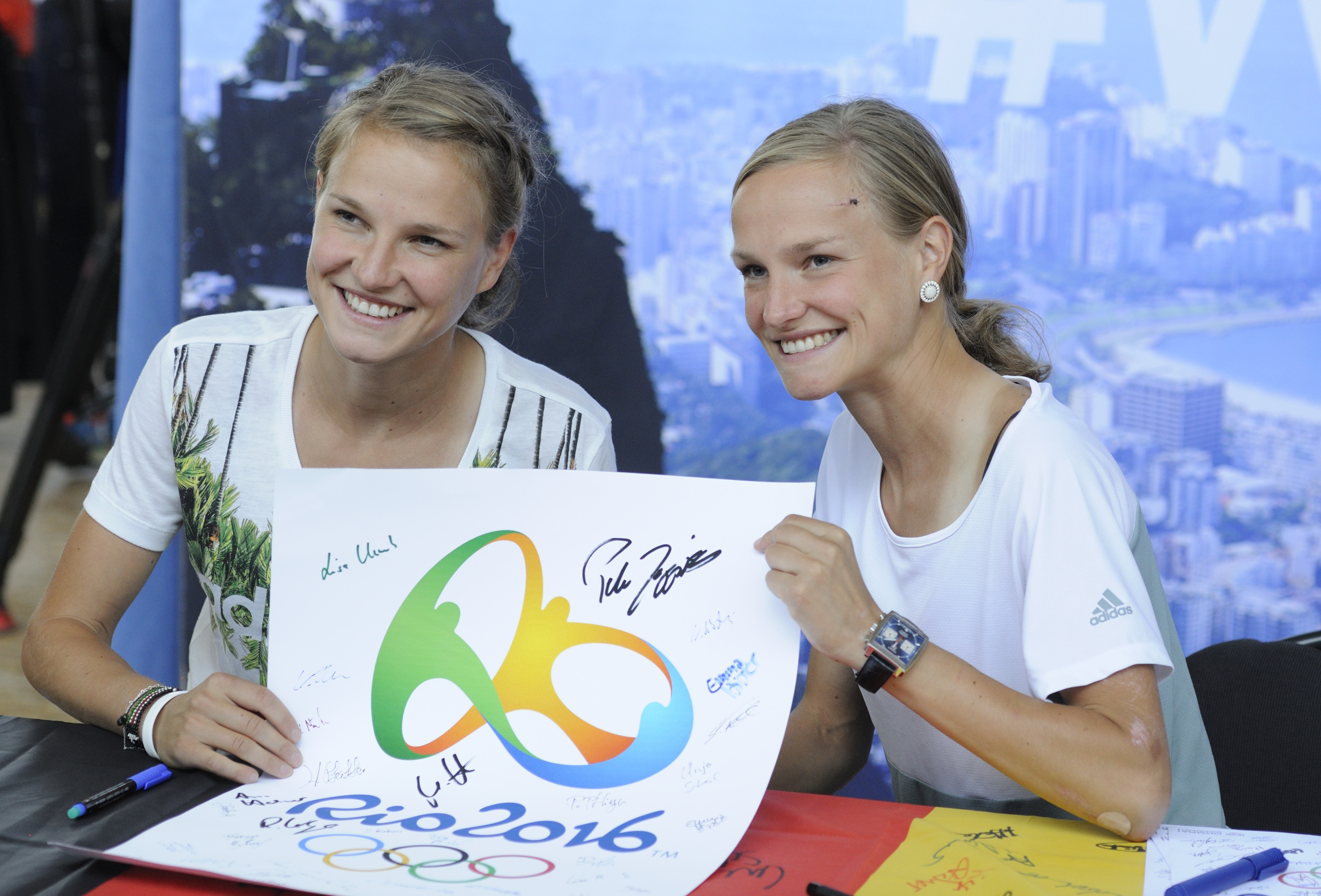
The twins before the Olympics in Hanover

She and her twin sister, Anna Hahner, were born in 1989. They were inspired to take up long distance running after hearing an interview with musician and amateur runner Joey Kelly when they were seventeen.

Lisa and Anna competed in the women's marathon event at the 2016 Summer Olympics. Lisa and Anna finished the marathon together but at a time 15 minutes below their personal bests. Thomas Kurschilgen, the German athletics director, criticised their joint (81/82nd) finish publicly, but the picture was valued by the media. They were accused of trying to attract media attention and they did get more coverage than their teammate, Anja Scherl, who finished ahead of them. The twins said that it was Anna's idea. When she realised that with two kilometres to go that she might capture Lisa, then she accelerated to catch her.

Lisa Hahner was publicly tarnished as "undesired" at the 2016 Frankfurt Marathon and has since not contested any marathon.

== Achievements ==
Year	Competition	Venue	Position	Event	Notes
Representing Germany
2011	European Cross Country Championships-Under-23 women team	Velenje, Slovenia	2nd	Cross Country	41 pts
2016	XXXI Summer Olympic Games	Rio de Janeiro, Brazil	82nd	Marathon	2:45:33

== Other Marathons ==
- 28 October 2012: 8th place in the Frankfurt Marathon with a time of 2:31.28
- 21 April 2013: 4th place in the Hamburg Marathon in 2:31.48
- 27 October 2013: 11th place in the Frankfurt Marathon in 2:30.17
- 25 October 2015: 6th place in the Frankfurt Marathon with her best time of 2:28.39
- 10 April 2016: 6th place in the Hannover Marathon in 2:34.56

== Enternal links ==
- Lisa Hahner at World Athletics
- Lisa Hahner at Tilastopaja (registration required)
- Lisa Hahner at ARRS
- Lisa Hahner at Olympics.com
- Lisa Hahner at the German Olympic Sports Confederation (in German)
- Lisa Hahner at Olympedia
- Lisa Hahner at InterSportStats
