= Anja Scherl =

German long-distance runner (born 1986)

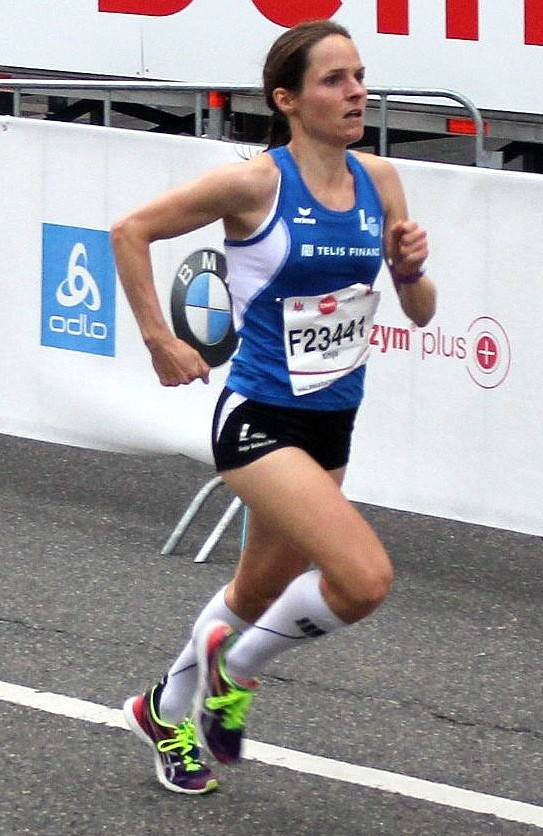
- Scherl in 2015

Personal information
- Nationality: German
- Born: 12 April 1986 (age 40) Amberg, West Germany
- Height: 160 cm (5 ft 3 in)
- Weight: 48 kg (106 lb)

Sport
- Country: Germany
- Sport: Track and field
- Event: Marathon

Anja Scherl (born 12 April 1986) is a German long-distance runner who specialises in the marathon. She competed in the women's marathon event at the 2016 Summer Olympics where she finished in 44th place.

Scherl finished well in the marathon, but her success was overshadowed by Anna and Lisa Hahner who controversially crossed the finishing line together at position 81 and 82. They were accused of trying to attract media attention, and they did get more coverage than Scherl.

== Life ==
In 2007, Anja Scherl was persuaded to take up running by her then boyfriend and later husband, who was also a former marathon runner; she had already jogged occasionally and played volleyball before that. Originally she wanted to start running marathons straight away, but her then coach at DJK Weiden sent her to run middle distances first.

After a year at LAC Quelle Fürth, she moved to PSV Grün-Weiß Kassel in 2012, with whom she won her first medals at German championships as part of the team. After winning the 2012 South German Championships over 5000 meters and a surprising fourth place at the 2012 German Championships over 10 km, made her marathon debut in 2014 at the Hamburg Marathon with a time of 2:48:08 h. In Husum, she became German runner-up in the half-marathon in 2015, and again in Hanover in 2017.

In 2016, Scherl became known to the public through her third place in the Hamburg Marathon and a time of 2:27:50 h, which also meant qualification for the 2016 Olympic Games in Rio de Janeiro.
