= Tobias Blum =

German long-distance runner (born 1995)

Personal information
- Born: 16 January 1995 (age 30)

Sport
- Country: Germany
- Sport: Athletics
- Event: Long-distance running

Tobias Blum (born 16 January 1995) is a German long-distance runner. In 2020, he competed in the men's race at the 2020 World Athletics Half Marathon Championships held in Gdynia, Poland.
