= Tereje Wodajo =

Ethiopian long-distance runner

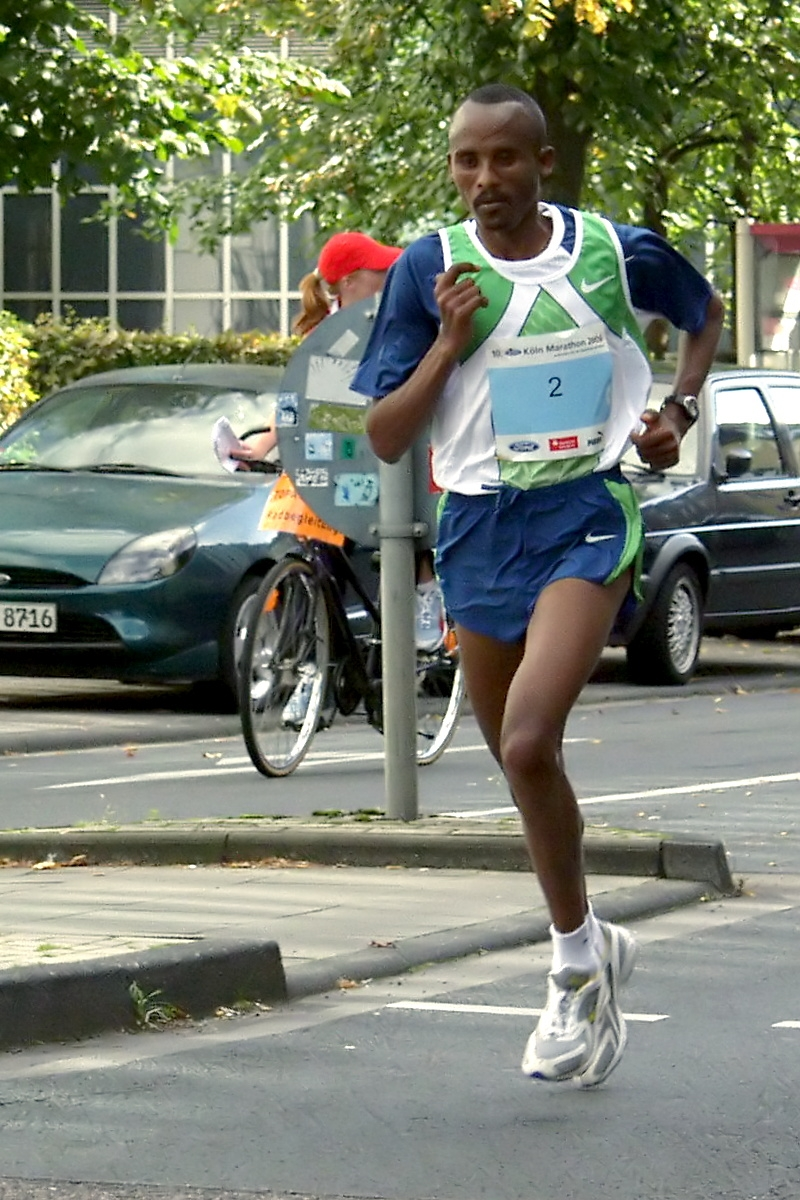
- Teferi Wodajo in the Cologne Marathon in 2006

Personal information
- Nationality: Ethiopian
- Born: 27 January 1982 (age 44)

Sport
- Sport: Long-distance running
- Event: Marathon

Tereje Wodajo (born 27 January 1982) is an Ethiopian long-distance runner. He competed in the men's marathon at the 2004 Summer Olympics.
