= Anna Hahner =

German athlete

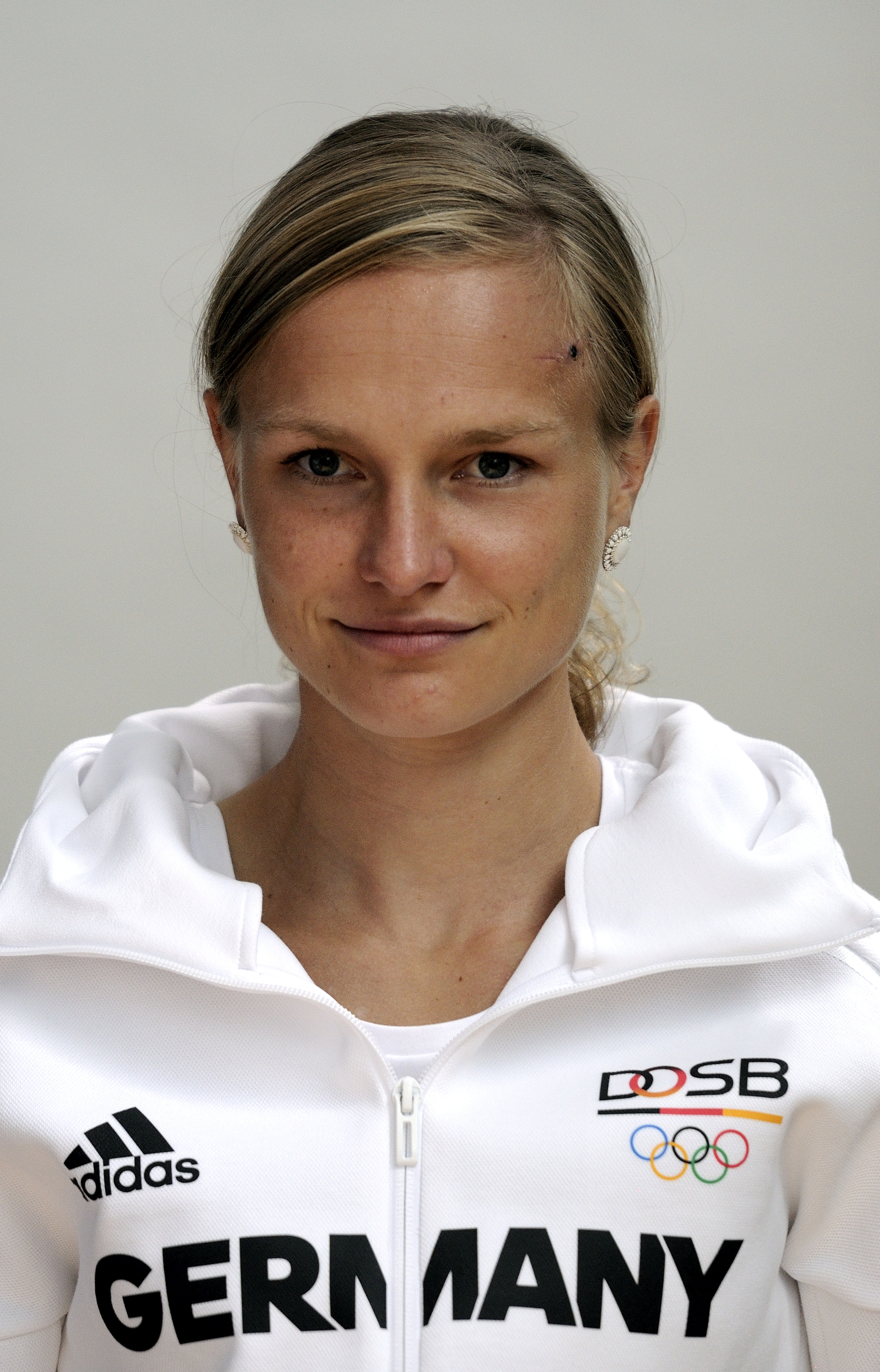
- Anna Hahner in 2016

Personal information
- Nationality: German
- Born: 20 November 1989 (age 36)
- Height: 165 cm (5 ft 5 in)
- Weight: 48 kg (106 lb)

Sport
- Country: Germany
- Sport: Track and field
- Event: Marathon

Anna Hahner (born 20 November 1989) is a German long-distance runner who specialises in the marathon.

== Life ==
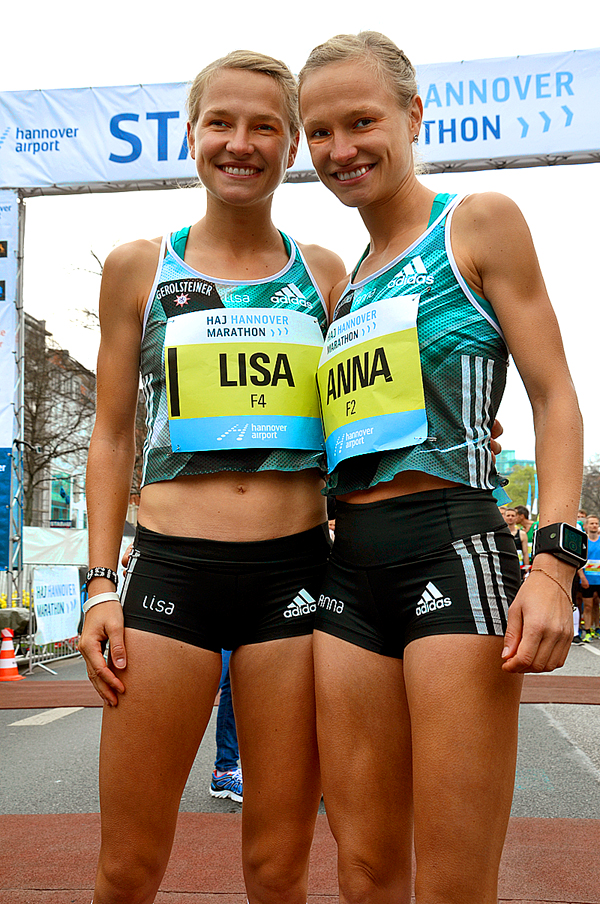
Anna and her sister at the HAJ Hannover Marathon

She and her twin sister, Lisa Hahner, were born in 1989. They were inspired to take up long distance running after hearing an interview with musician and amateur runner Joey Kelly when they were seventeen.

Anna Hahner won the Vienna Marathon in 2014 but refused to take part in the European championships. Anna refused because she has set herself a limit of two marathons a year.

Anna competed in the women's marathon event at the 2016 Summer Olympics. She and Lisa controversially crossed the finishing line together at position 81 and 82. They finished more than 15 minutes below their personal bests. They were accused of trying to attract media attention and they did get more coverage than their teammate, Anja Scherl, who finished ahead of them. They said that it was Anna's idea when she realised that with two kilometres to go that she might capture Lisa.

German Athletics Federation director Thomas Kurschilgen said that their aim was just to create attention.

Anna set her personal record at the 2014 Berlin Marathon, running a time of 2:26:44. She finished in 7th as the top female finisher from Europe.

With her twin sister Lisa she coaches local athletes. With her partner Philipp Herold she became a parent to a son in 2023.
