= Rebecca Robisch =

German triathlete

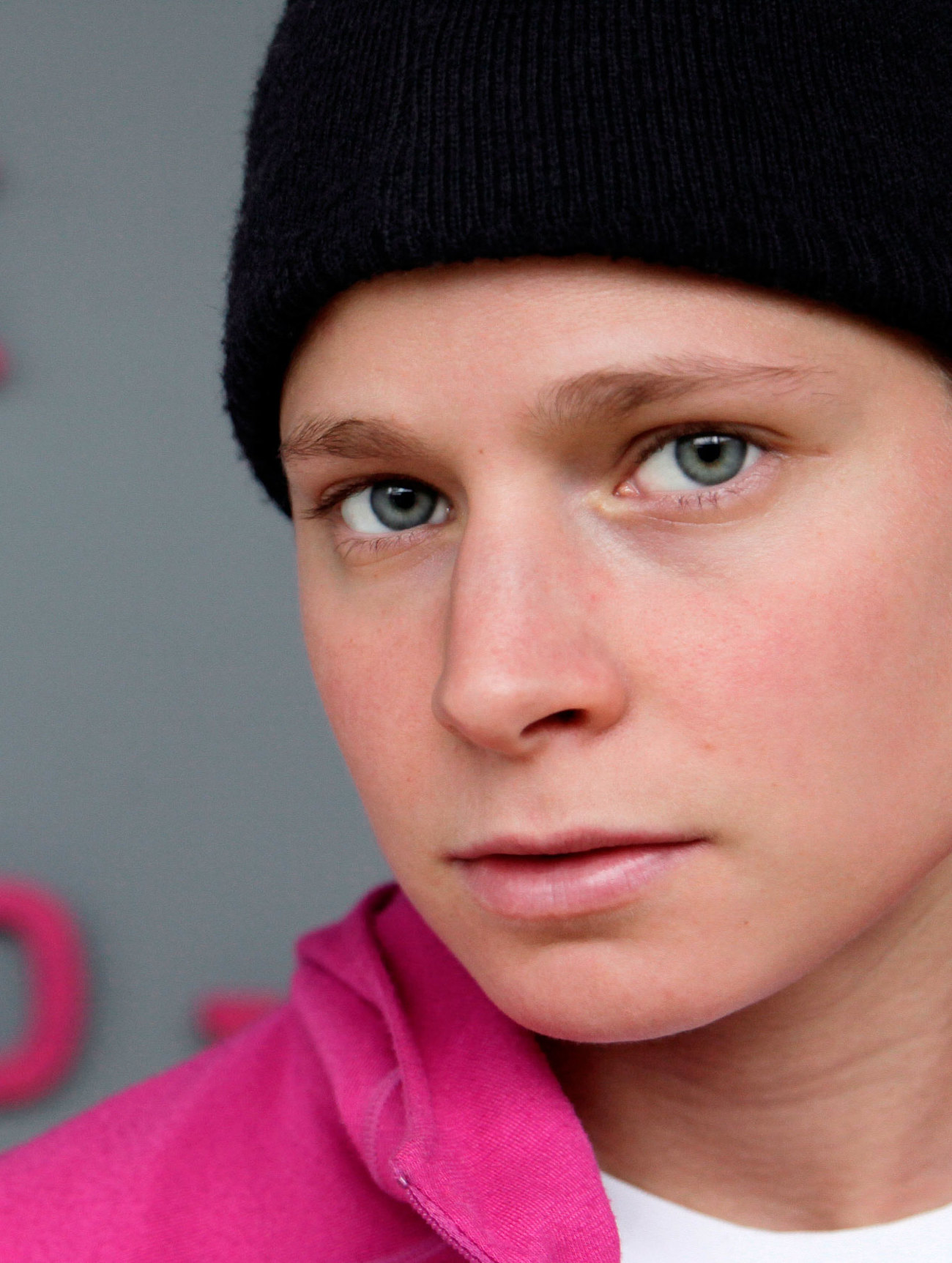
- Rebecca Robisch in 2010

Personal information
- Born: 14 April 1988 (age 38)

Sport
- Sport: Triathlon

Rebecca Robisch (born 4 April 1988) is a German triathlete. She qualified for the 2016 Summer Olympics. She had a top-ten finish at the World Triathlon Series in Stockholm in 2015.
